= 1954 USA Outdoor Track and Field Championships =

American athletics championship event

- Dates: 18–19 June (men); 30-31 July (women); 9 October (pentathlon)
- Host city: St. Louis, Missouri (men); Harrisburg, Pennsylvania (women); Cleveland, Ohio (pentathlon)
- Venue: St. Louis Public Schools Stadium (men); Fager Field (women)
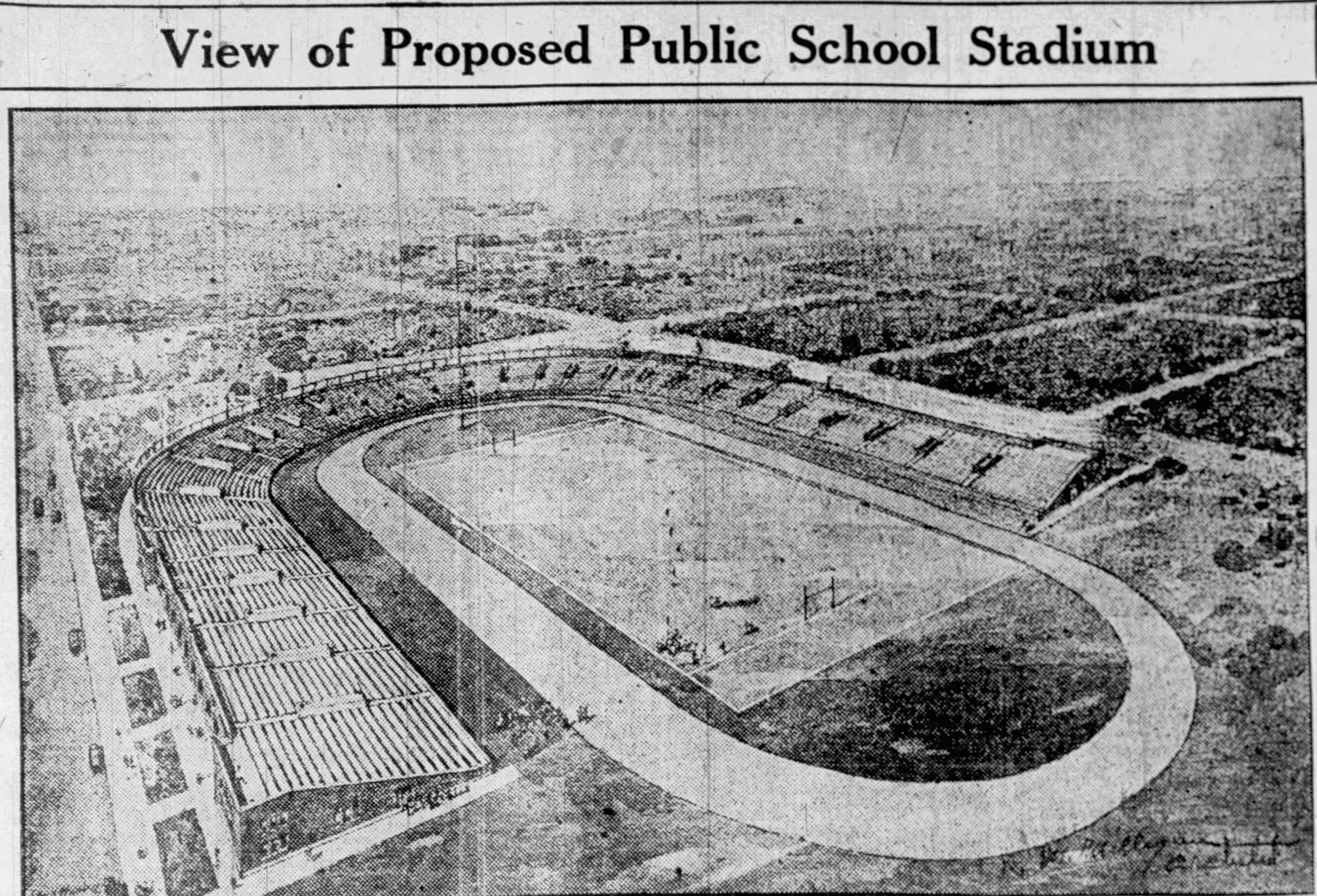

The 1954 USA Outdoor Track and Field Championships were organized by the Amateur Athletic Union (AAU) and served as the national championships in outdoor track and field for the United States.

The men's edition was held at St. Louis Public Schools Stadium in St. Louis, Missouri, and it took place 18–19 June. The women's meet was held separately at Fager Field in Harrisburg, Pennsylvania, on 30-31 July. The women's pentathlon was held on 9 October in Cleveland, Ohio.

The men's championships were described as hot and humid with little wind. In the women's competition, the shot put weight was changed from 8 pounds (3.6 kg) to the international standard 4 kilograms (8.8 lb) for the first time.

== Results ==
=== Men ===
Event	Gold		Silver		Bronze	
100 yards	Arthur Bragg	9.5	Willie Williams	9.58	Dean Smith	9.61
220 yards	Arthur Bragg	21.1	Charles Thomas	21.10	Andrew Stanfield	21.19
440 yards	James Lea	46.6	Louis Jones	46.68	Jesse Mashburn	46.98
880 yards	Malvin Whitfield	1:50.8	Bill Tidwell	1:51.2	Eugene Maynard	1:51.4
1 mile	Fred Dwyer	4:09.5	Lowell Zellers	4:09.8	Leonard Simpson	4:11.0
3 miles	Horace Ashenfelter	14:18.5	Gordon McKenzie	14:21.6	Gene Matthews	14:23.0
6 miles	Curt Stone	31:39.4	Fred Wilt	31:54.8	Richard Hart	32:05.0
Marathon	Theodore Corbitt	2:46:13.9	Nick Costes	2:47:59.0	Aldo Scandurra	2:50:19.0
120 yards hurdles	Jack Davis	14.0	Willard Thomson	14.36	Willard Wright	14.42
220 yards hurdles	Jack Davis	23.2				
440 yards hurdles	Joshua Culbreath	52.0	Burl McCoy	53.77	Roy Thompson	53.93
2 miles steeplechase	William Ashenfelter	10:08.2	Warren Dreutzler	10:13.6	Horace Ashenfelter	10:16.6
2 miles walk	Henry Laskau	14:23.3				
High jump	Ernest Shelton	2.07 m	Floyd Jeter	2.05 m	Doug Spainhower	2.02 m
Pole vault	Bob Richards	4.66 m	Donald Laz	4.48 m	none awarded	
Pole vault	Bob Richards	4.66 m	Bobby Smith	4.48 m	none awarded	
Long jump	John Bennett	7.57 m	George Brown	7.56 m	Neville Price (RSA)	7.40 m
Triple jump	Claudio Cabrejas (CUB)	14.40 m	Pat Lochiatto	14.33 m	Kent Floerke	14.28 m
Shot put	Parry O'Brien	17.98 m	Tom Jones	16.55 m	Bill Bangert	16.37 m
Discus throw	Fortune Gordien	55.52 m	Parry O'Brien	54.11 m	James Dillion	53.44 m
Hammer throw	Robert Backus	57.68 m	Martin Engel	56.51 m	Gilbert Borjeson	54.18 m
Javelin throw	Bud Held	76.11 m	William Miller	71.77 m	Leo Long	68.93 m
Weight throw for distance	Bob Backus	42 ft 5 1/4 in (12.93 m)				
Pentathlon	Brayton Norton	3400 pts				
All-around decathlon	Merwin Carter	5330 pts				
Decathlon	Bob Richards	6501 pts	Aubrey Lewis	6118 pts	Rafer Johnson	5874 pts

=== Women ===
Event	Gold		Silver		Bronze	
50 m	Mabel Landry	6.5	Barbara Lee		Dolores Dwyer	
100 m	Barbara Jones	12.0	Mabel Landry		Delores Queary	
200 m	Mae Faggs	24.5	Betty MacDonnell		Alfrances Lyman	
80 m hurdles	Constance Darnowski	12.2	Lula Bell		Barbara Mueller	
High jump	Verneda Thomas	1.55 m	none awarded		Mildred McDaniel	1.48 m
High jump	Jeanette Cantrell	1.55 m	none awarded		Lula Bell	1.48 m
High jump	Jeanette Cantrell	1.55 m	none awarded		Veronica Lewis	1.48 m
High jump	Jeanette Cantrell	1.55 m	none awarded		Billie Jo Jackson	1.48 m
Long jump	Mabel Landry	5.46 m	Barbara Jones	5.42 m	Elvira Siksnius	5.08 m
Shot put	Lois Ann Testa	12.79 m	Paula Deubel	12.72 m	Joan Stouffer	
Discus throw	Marjorie Larney	36.87 m	Janet Dicks	32.76 m	Lois Ann Testa	30.87 m
Javelin throw	Karen Anderson	38.73 m	Amelia Wershoven	37.59 m	Lula Bell	37.02 m
Baseball throw	Marion Brown Young	245 ft 0 1/2 in (74.68 m)				
Women's pentathlon	Stella Walsh (POL)	1738 pts	Betty MacDonnell	1546 pts	Dolores Dwyer	1516 pts

== See also ==
- List of USA Outdoor Track and Field Championships winners (men)
- List of USA Outdoor Track and Field Championships winners (women)
