= 1955 USA Outdoor Track and Field Championships =

American athletics championship event

- Dates: 24–25 June (men); 17-18 June (women); 15 October (pentathlon)
- Host city: Boulder, Colorado (men); Ponca City, Oklahoma (women); Morristown, New Jersey (pentathlon)
- Venue: Folsom Field (men); Blaine Stadium (women)
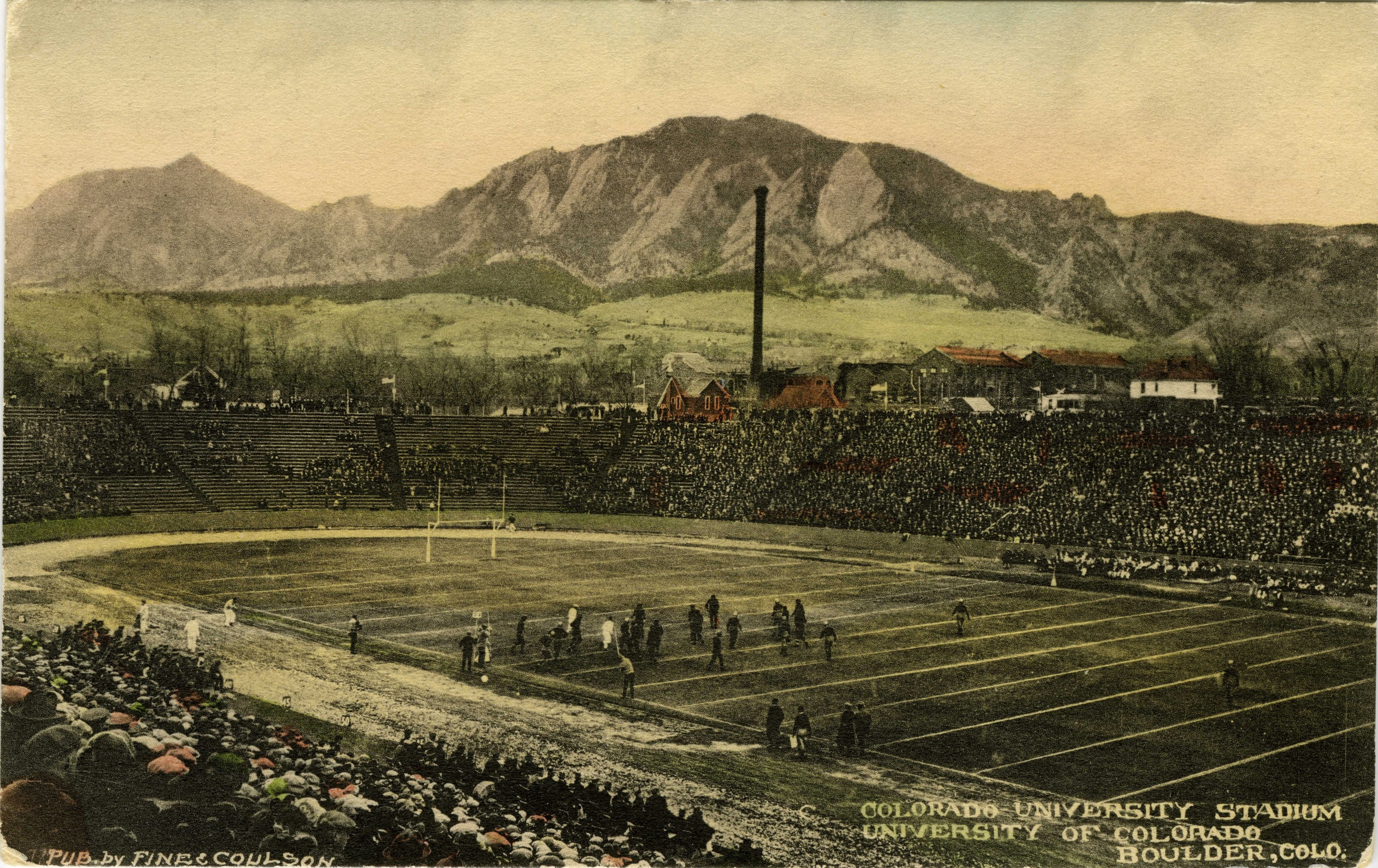

The 1955 USA Outdoor Track and Field Championships were organized by the Amateur Athletic Union (AAU) and served as the national championships in outdoor track and field for the United States.

The men's edition was held at Folsom Field in Boulder, Colorado, and it took place 24–25 June. The women's meet was held separately at Blaine Stadium in Ponca City, Oklahoma, on 17-18 June. The women's pentathlon was contested on 15 October in Morristown, New Jersey.

Despite inclement weather, 14,500 fans attended the final day of men's competition. Arnie Sowell's time in the 880 yards was just one tenth off the world record. Because the athletics at the 1955 Pan American Games were so early in the season, marks from the 1955 USA Indoor Track and Field Championships were used to select the women's team for this event. The pentathlon competition decided the first official American record holder as it was the first U.S. competition to use the then-internationally recognized shot put, high jump, 80 m hurdles, 200 m, and long jump events.

== Results ==
=== Men ===
Event	Gold		Silver		Bronze	
100 yards	Bobby Morrow	9.5	Rodney Richard	9.5	Dean Smith	9.5
220 yards	Rodney Richard	21.0	Dick Blair	21.1	Andrew Stanfield	21.2
440 yards	Charles Jenkins Sr.	46.7	James Lea	46.9	Richard Maiocco	47.1
880 yards	Arnold Sowell	1:47.6	Thomas Courtney	1:48.0	Bill Tidwell	1:48.1
1 mile	Wesley Santee	4:11.5	Fred Dwyer	4:14.1	Bob Seaman	4:14.8
3 miles	Horace Ashenfelter	14:45.2	Gordon McKenzie	14:59.6	Bob Hunt	15:13.7
6 miles	Richard Hart	31:58.4	Gordon McKenzie	32:28.0	George King	33:00.3
Marathon	Nick Costes	2:31:12.4	Rudolfo Mendez	2:44:21.0	Theodore Corbitt	2:49:37.0
120 yards hurdles	Milt Campbell	13.9	William Youkers	14.2	Charles Pratt	14.4
220 yards hurdles	Charles Pratt	23.5				
440 yards hurdles	Joshua Culbreath	52.0	Willie Atterberry	52.4	James Luttrell	52.8
2 miles steeplechase	Ken Reiser	10:20.7	Horace Ashenfelter	10:28.9	Ed Shea	10:35.0
2 miles walk	Henry Laskau	15:09.4				
High jump	Charles Dumas	2.08 m	none awarded		Vernon Wilson	2.03 m
High jump	Ernest Shelton	2.08 m	none awarded		Vernon Wilson	2.03 m
Pole vault	Bob Richards	4.57 m	Walt Levack	4.42 m	none awarded	
Pole vault	Bob Richards	4.57 m	Bobby Smith	4.42 m	none awarded	
Long jump	Gregory Bell	7.94 m	John Bennett	7.65 m	Malachi Andrews	7.62 m
Triple jump	Victor Hernandez (CUB)	15.34 m	Bill Sharpe	14.79 m	Kent Floerke	14.76 m
Shot put	Parry O'Brien	17.82 m	Tom Jones	17.23 m	William Nieder	17.02 m
Discus throw	Parry O'Brien	53.52 m	Fortune Gordien	53.19 m	Desmond Koch	52.39 m
Hammer throw	Hal Connolly	60.86 m	Robert Backus	56.41 m	Samuel Felton	52.17 m
Javelin throw	Bud Held	79.32 m	Cyrus Young	76.80 m	William Miller	74.33 m
Weight throw for distance	Bob Backus	43 ft 5 in (13.23 m)				
Pentathlon	Des Koch	3216 pts				
All-around decathlon	Lyman Frasier	6733 pts				
Decathlon	Bob Richards	6873 pts	Robert Lawson	6501 pts	Joel Shankle	6455 pts

=== Women ===
Event	Gold		Silver		Bronze	
50 yards	Isabell Daniels	6.0	Rebecca Ayars		Lucinda Williams	
100 yards	Mae Faggs	10.8	Martha Hudson		Alfrances Lyman	
220 yards	Mae Faggs	25.1	Alfrances Lyman		Gayle Dierks	
80 m hurdles	Bertha Diaz (CUB)	11.5	Barbara Mueller		Nancy Phillips	
High jump	Mildred McDaniel	1.69 m	Billie Jo Jackson	1.54 m	Verneda Thomas	1.49 m
Long jump	Nancy Phillips	5.33 m	Shirley Hereford	5.04 m	Anna Lois Smith	5.00 m
Shot put	Wanda Wejzgrowicz	11.39 m	Lois Ann Testa	11.17 m	Marjorie Larney	10.85 m
Discus throw	Alejandra Herrera (CUB)	35.86 m	Marjorie Larney	35.08 m	Patricia Monsanto	34.47 m
Javelin throw	Karen Anderson	45.75 m	Amelia Wershoven	41.25 m	Marjorie Larney	38.83 m
Baseball throw	Amelia Wershoven	249 ft 1 1/4 in (75.92 m)				
Women's pentathlon	Barbara Mueller	3539 pts	Stella Walsh (POL)	3431 pts	Nancy Phillips	3388 pts

== See also ==
- List of USA Outdoor Track and Field Championships winners (men)
- List of USA Outdoor Track and Field Championships winners (women)
