= 1953 USA Outdoor Track and Field Championships =

American athletics championship event

- Dates: 26–27 June (men); 24-25 July (women); 18 October (pentathlon)
- Host city: Dayton, Ohio (men); San Antonio, Texas (women); Berkeley, California (pentathlon)
- Venue: Welcome Stadium (men); Alamo Heights Stadium (women)
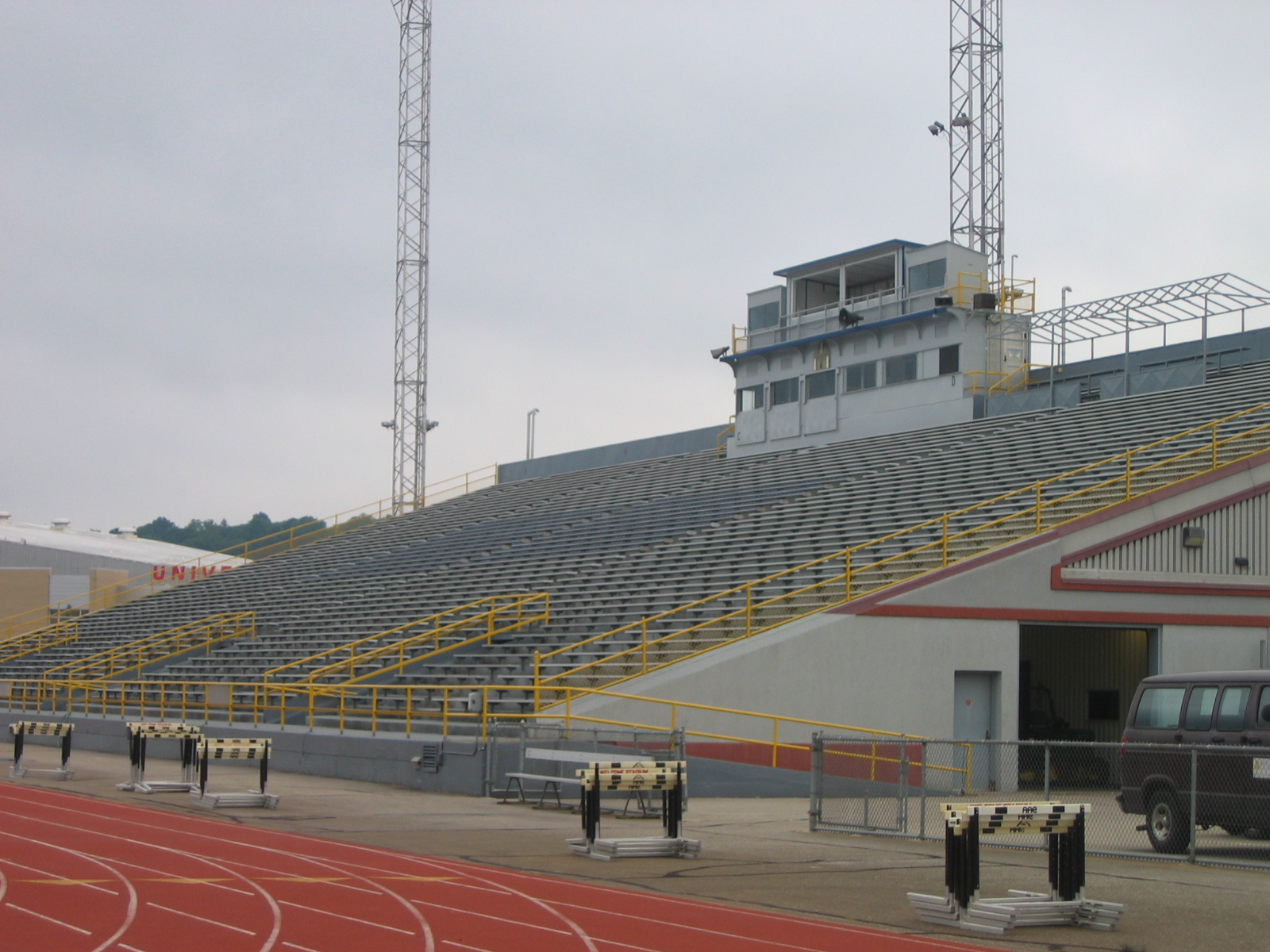

The 1953 USA Outdoor Track and Field Championships were organized by the Amateur Athletic Union (AAU) and served as the national championships in outdoor track and field for the United States.

The men's edition was held at Welcome Stadium in Dayton, Ohio, and it took place 26–27 June. The women's meet was held separately at Alamo Heights Stadium in San Antonio, Texas, on 24–25 July. The women's pentathlon was held on 18 October in Berkeley, California.

At the men's championships, imperial distances were used for the first time since 1931, and they would continue to be used until conversion back to metric in the 1970s. Walter Davis broke the high jump world record as 9,500 spectators attended on the first day and 7,500 on the final day. In the women's competition, no meet records were set due to decreased participation following the 1952 Summer Olympics.

== Results ==
=== Men ===
| Event | Gold | | Silver | | Bronze | |
|---|---|---|---|---|---|---|
| 100 yards | Arthur Bragg | 9.5 | Thane Baker | 9.6 | James Golliday | 9.6 |
| 220 yards | Andrew Stanfield | 21.2 | Arthur Bragg | 21.3 | Thane Baker | 21.4 |
| 440 yards | Jesse Mashburn | 47.1 | James Lea | 48.0 | Herbert McKenley (JAM) | 48.2 |
| 880 yards | Malvin Whitfield | 1:51.5 | Henry Cryer | 1:51.7 | Jerome Walters | 1:52.9 |
| 1 mile | Wesley Santee | 4:07.6 | Fred Dwyer | 4:12.1 | Bruce Drummond | 4:14.1 |
| 3 miles | Charles Cappozzoli | 14:28.2 | Gordon McKenzie | 14:46.1 | Kikuo Moriya (JPN) | 15:08.0 |
| 6 miles | Curt Stone | 31:18.2 | Bob Kelly | 31:39.3 | Robert Lippemeier | 31:52.8 |
| Marathon | Gösta Leandersson (SWE) | 2:48:12.5 | John Lafferty | 2:50.31 | John A. Kelley | 2:55.14 |
| 120 yards hurdles | Jack Davis | 13.9 | Milt Campbell | 14.1 | Willard Thomson | 14.2 |
| 220 yards hurdles | Jack Davis | 23.7 | | | | |
| 440 yards hurdles | Joshua Culbreath | 52.5 | William Johnson | 53.7 | Harry Bright | 54.5 |
| 2 miles steeplechase | Horace Ashenfelter | 10:02.5 | Warren Dreutzler | 10:29.7 | Philip Coleman | 10:41.5 |
| 2 miles walk | Henry Laskau | 14:23.4 | | | | |
| High jump | Walter Davis | 2.13 m | Ernest Shelton | 2.02 m | none awarded | |
| High jump | Walter Davis | 2.13 m | J.Lewis Hall | 2.02 m | none awarded | |
| Pole vault | Donald Laz | 4.29 m | none awarded | | Van Zimmerman | 4.20 m |
| Pole vault | George Mattos | 4.29 m | none awarded | | Donald Bragg | 4.20 m |
| Pole vault | George Mattos | 4.29 m | none awarded | | Fred Barnes | 4.20 m |
| Pole vault | George Mattos | 4.29 m | none awarded | | Len Eilers | 4.20 m |
| Long jump | George Brown | 7.89 m | Ron Soble | 7.43 m | Meredith Gourdine | 7.38 m |
| Triple jump | George Shaw | 14.53 m | Glenn Beerline | 14.39 m | Moses Hunter | 14.22 m |
| Shot put | Parry O'Brien | 17.66 m | Bernard Mayer | 16.77 m | Tom Jones | 16.33 m |
| Discus throw | Fortune Gordien | 56.02 m | Simeon Iness | 54.62 m | Jack Ellis | 52.49 m |
| Hammer throw | Martin Engel | 56.92 m | Samuel Felton | 55.24 m | Hal Connolly | 53.62 m |
| Javelin throw | Bud Held | 73.94 m | Cyrus Young | 73.61 m | William Miller | 70.09 m |
| Weight throw for distance | Bob Backus | 37 ft 2 3/4 in (11.34 m) | | | | |
| Pentathlon | Brayton Norton | 3278 pts | | | | |
| All-around decathlon | Bob Richards | 7031 pts | | | | |
| Decathlon | Milt Campbell | 7232 pts | Bob Richards | 6425 pts | James Cooke | 6084 pts |

=== Women ===
| Event | Gold | | Silver | | Bronze | |
|---|---|---|---|---|---|---|
| 50 m | Mabel Landry | 6.6 | Annie McDonald | | Esther Villalon (MEX) | |
| 100 m | Barbara Jones | 11.9 | Dolores Dwyer | | Mabel Landry | |
| 200 m | Dolores Dwyer | 24.4 | Barbara Jones | | Calpurnia Jackson | |
| 80 m hurdles | Nancy Phillips | 12.2 | Constance Darnowski | | Barbara Mueller | |
| High jump | Mildred McDaniel | 1.56 m | Lula Bell | 1.47 m | none awarded | |
| High jump | Mildred McDaniel | 1.56 m | Jeanette Cantrell | 1.47 m | none awarded | |
| Long jump | Mabel Landry | 5.68 m | Nancy Phillips | 5.31 m | Arlene Pugh | 5.21 m |
| Shot put (8 lb) | Amelia Bert | 12.25 m | Paula Deubel | 12.12 m | Donnis Thompson | 11.94 m |
| Discus throw | Janet Dicks | 37.54 m | Marjorie Larney | 36.02 m | Concepcion Villaneuva (MEX) | 33.07 m |
| Javelin throw | Amelia Wershoven | 37.97 m | Marjorie Larney | 37.16 m | Janet Dicks | 35.98 m |
| Baseball throw | Marion Brown Young | 268 ft 9 in (81.91 m) | | | | |
| Women's pentathlon | Stanislawa Walasiewicz (POL) | 1911 pts | Dolores Dwyer | 1540 pts | Elizabeth Coll | 1159 pts |

== See also ==
- List of USA Outdoor Track and Field Championships winners (men)
- List of USA Outdoor Track and Field Championships winners (women)
