= 1957 USA Outdoor Track and Field Championships =

- Dates: June 20–22 (men); August 10 (women)
- Host city: Dayton, Ohio (men); Shaker Heights, Ohio (women); United States
- Venue: Welcome Stadium (men); Shaker Heights High School Field (women)

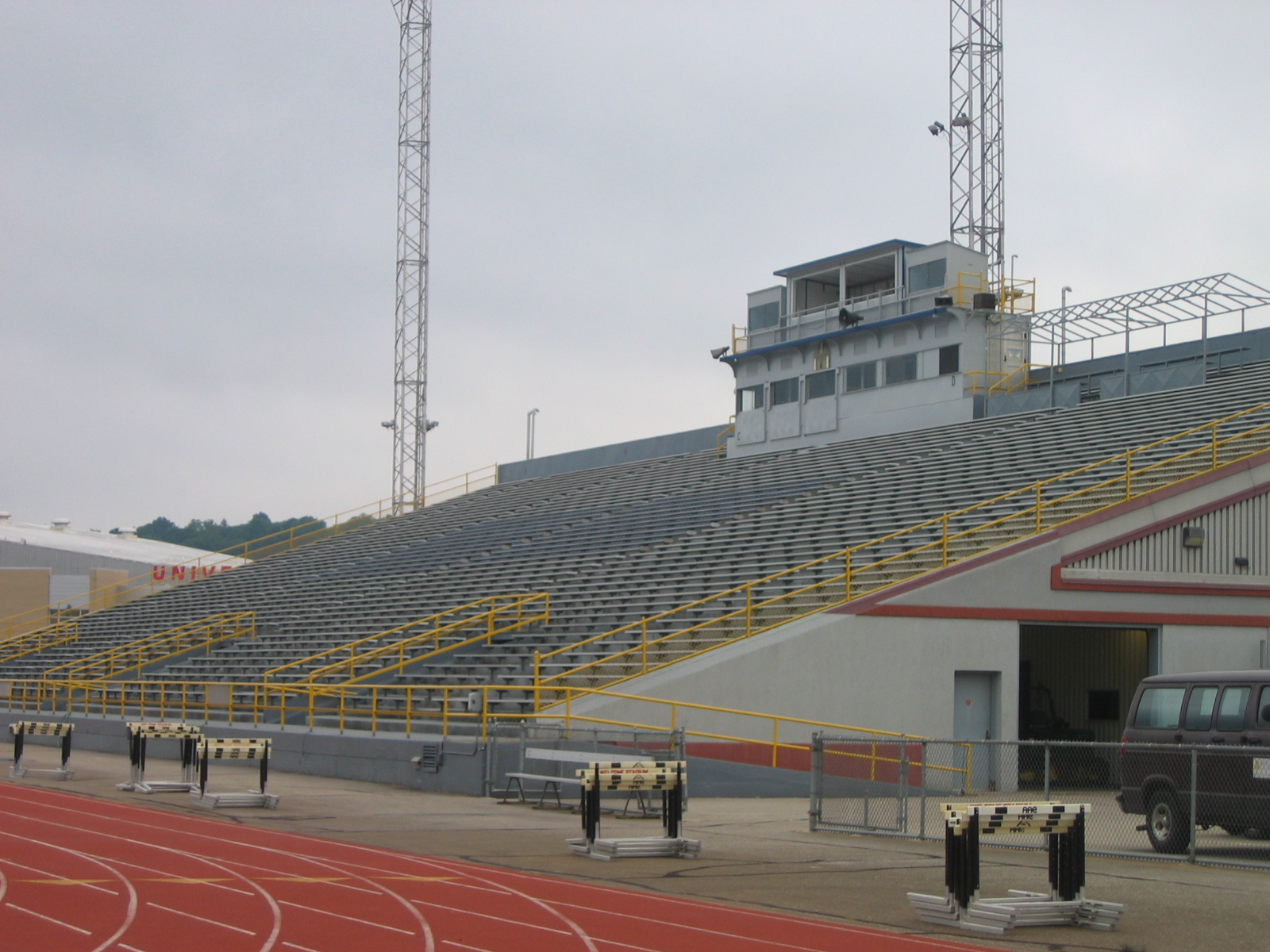
Welcome Stadium hosted the men's championships

The 1957 USA Outdoor Track and Field Championships men's competition took place between June 20–22 at Welcome Stadium in Dayton, Ohio. The high jump apron at Welcome Stadium was made of asphalt to the surprise of Olympic Champion Charles Dumas who brought long spikes. After a visit to a local shoe store, Dumas went on to win at 6'10¼"

The men's edition was described as "one of the worst-organized meets in AAU history" by Track & Field News, with many officiating errors, timing errors, incorrect staggers in the 220 and 440 yards, and poor weather.

== Results ==
=== Men track events ===
Event	Gold		Silver		Bronze	
100 yards (-1.7 m/s)	Leamon King	9.7	David Sime	9.7	Ira Murchison	9.8
220 yards (+1.3 m/s); Lanes improperly measured	Ollan Cassell	21.0 (214 2/3 yds)	Ed Collymore	21.0 (217 1/3 yds)	Preston Griffin	21.2 (216 yds)
440 yards (+1.3 m/s); Lanes improperly measured	Reginald Pearman	46.4 (432 yds)	John Telford	46.5 (430 2/3 yds)	Charles Jenkins	46.7 (436 yds)
880 yards	Thomas Courtney	1:50.1	Arnold Sowell	1:50.6	Lang Stanley	1:51.1
Mile run	Merv Lincoln Australia; Bob Seaman	4:06.1 CRy; 4:07.1	Don Bowden	4:07.2	Burr Grim	4:07.2
3 miles	John Macy	13:55.0	Max Truex	14:03.0	Bill Dellinger	14:04.5
6 miles	Douglas Kyle Canada; Jerry Smartt	29:22.8 CRy; 29:48.3	John Kelley	30:01.0	Mal Robertson	30:16.8
Marathon	John Kelley	2:24:55.2	Alfred Confalone	2.34.11	Theodore Corbitt	2.34.17
120 yard hurdles	Lee Calhoun	13.8	Elias Gilbert	14.1	Charles Pratt	14.3
220 yards hurdles	Elias Gilbert	22.5				
440 yard hurdles	Glenn Davis	50.9 CRy	Josh Culbreath	51.2	Cliff Cushman	53.0
2 mile steeplechase	Charles Jones	9:49.6 CRy	Horace Ashenfelter	9:54.8	Lew Stieglitz	10:05.6
2 miles walk	Henry Laskau	14:28.3				
20 kilometres race walk	Rudy Haluza	1:49:16	Adolph Weinacker	1:50:08	Carl Kurr	1:51:14

=== Men field events ===
Event	Gold		Silver		Bronze	
High jump	Charles Dumas	6 ft 10 1/4 in (2.08 m)	Phil Reavis; Ernie Shelton	6 ft 9 in (2.05 m)		
Pole vault	Bob Richards	15 ft 1 1/2 in (4.61 m)	Don Bragg	14 ft 10 1/2 in (4.53 m)	Ron Morris; George Mattos; Dave Kenly; Jerry Welbourn	14 ft 7 1/4 in (4.45 m)
Long jump	Ernie Shelby	25 ft 2 1/2 in (7.68 m)	John Bennett	24 ft 7 1/4 in (7.49 m)	Frank Herrmann	24 ft 5 in (7.44 m)
Triple jump	Bill Sharpe	50 ft 4 1/4 in (15.34 m)	Kent Floerke	50 ft 2 3/4 in (15.3 m)	George Shaw	49 ft 1 3/4 in (14.97 m)
Shot put	Bill Nieder	61 ft 6 1/2 in (18.75 m) CR	Dave Owen	57 ft 0 in (17.37 m)	Don Vick	56 ft 11 1/4 in (17.35 m)
Discus throw	Al Oerter	181 ft 6 in (55.32 m)	Rink Babka	180 ft 3 1/2 in (54.95 m)	Fortune Gordien	174 ft 3 in (53.11 m)
Javelin throw	Bob Voiles	Note: All marks, with the exception of Fromm’s, were made in qualifying on June 21; 251 ft 5 1/2 in (76.64 m)	Bud Held	248 ft 6 in (75.74 m)	John Fromm	243 ft 3 in (74.14 m)
Hammer throw	Hal Connolly	216 ft 3 in (65.91 m) CR	Al Hall	213 ft 0 in (64.92 m)	John Lawlor Ireland; Marty Engel	199 ft 11 in (60.93 m); 197 ft 1 in (60.07 m)
Weight throw for distance	Bob Backus	44 ft 8 1/2 in (13.62 m)				
Pentathlon	Howard Smith	3362 pts				
All-around decathlon	Tom Pagani	6741 pts				
Decathlon	Charles Pratt	7164	Dave Edstrom	6981	Bob Lawson	6910

=== Women track events ===
Event	Gold		Silver	Bronze
50 yards	Barbara Jones	6.2	Martha Hudson	Annetta Anderson
100 yards	Barbara Jones	10.9	Isabelle Daniels	Alfrances Lyman
220 yards	Isabelle Daniels	24.7	Margaret Matthews	Alfrances Lyman
80 metres hurdles	Shirley Crowder	12.4	Doris McCaffey	Lauretta Foley

=== Women field events ===
Event	Gold		Silver		Bronze	
High jump	Hazel Ulmer; Neomia Rogers; Verneda Thomas	4 ft 11 in (1.49 m)				
Long jump	Margaret Matthews	19 ft 5 1/2 in (5.93 m)	Anna Lois Smith	19 ft 3 1/4 in (5.87 m)	Willye White	
Shot put	Earlene Brown	43 ft 0 in (13.1 m)	Lois Ann Testa	41 ft 1 1/4 in (12.52 m)	Marjorie Larney	38 ft 10 in (11.83 m)
Discus throw	Olga Connolly	147 ft 8 1/4 in (45.01 m)	Earlene Brown	141 ft 6 1/2 in (43.14 m)	Marjorie Larney	136 ft 5 1/4 in (41.58 m)
Javelin throw	Marjorie Larney	187 ft 8 in (57.2 m)	Amelia Wershoven	132 ft 1 in (40.25 m)	Annette Jenkins	116 ft 7 in (35.53 m)
Baseball throw	Earlene Brown	271 ft 10 in (82.85 m)				
Pentathlon	Ann Roniger	3803	Barbara Mueller	3721	Betty Scott	3450

== See also ==
- United States Olympic Trials (track and field)
