= 1956 USA Indoor Track and Field Championships =

National athletics championship event

- Dates: February 23 (men); January 21 (women)
- Host city: New York City, New York, United States (men); Washington, D.C., United States (women)
- Venue: Madison Square Garden (men); D.C. Armory (women)
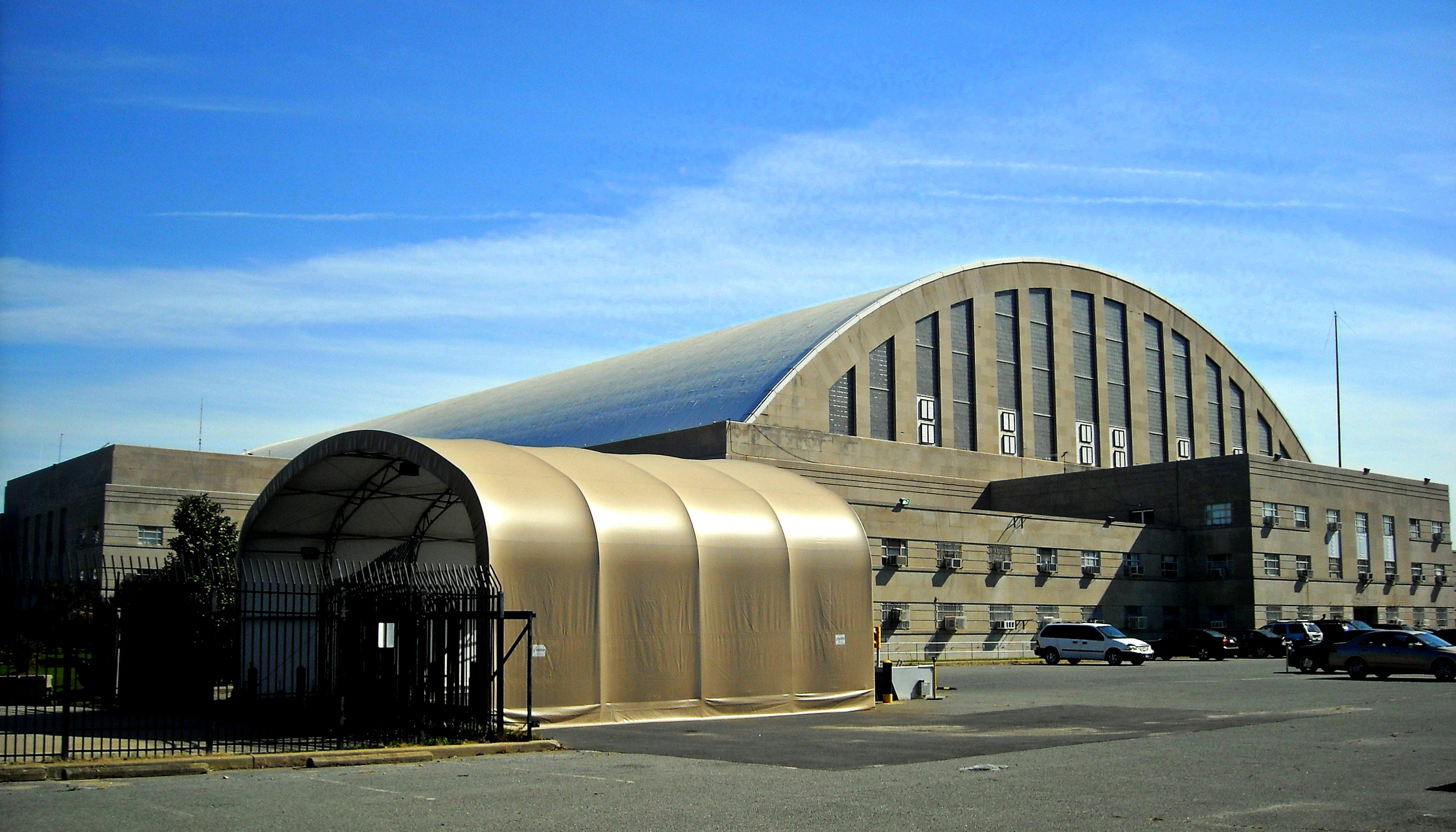
- Level: Senior
- Type: Indoor
- Events: 20 (12 men's + 8 women's)

The 1956 USA Indoor Track and Field Championships were organized by the Amateur Athletic Union (AAU) and served as the national championships in indoor track and field for the United States.

The men's edition was held at Madison Square Garden in New York City, New York, and it took place February 23. The women's meet was held separately at the D.C. Armory in Washington, D.C., taking place January 21.

At the championships, foreign guest Ron Delany won the mile by 10 yards. The women's championships were held in conjunction with the ninth annual Washington Star Games invitational track meet in January.

== Medal summary ==
=== Men ===
Event	Gold		Silver	Bronze
60 yards	John Haines	6.2		
600 yards	Lou Jones	1:11.0		
1000 yards	Arnie Sowell	2:08.4		
Mile run	Ron Delany (IRL)	4:14.5	Laszlo Tabori (HUN)	Fred Dwyer
3 miles	Horace Ashenfelter	14:09.6		
60 yards hurdles	Lee Calhoun	7.2		
High jump	Ernie Shelton	2.06 m		
Pole vault	Don Bragg	4.60 m		
Pole vault	Bob Richards	4.60 m		
Long jump	Roslyn Range	7.50 m		
Shot put	Parry O'Brien	18.72 m		
Weight throw	Bob Backus	19.47 m		
1 mile walk	Henry Laskau	6:44.5		

=== Women ===
Event	Gold		Silver	Bronze
50 yards	Isabelle Daniels	6.2		
100 yards	Isabelle Daniels	11.1		
220 yards	Mae Faggs	26.8		
70 yards hurdles	Connie Darnowski	9.7		
High jump	Mildred McDaniel	1.62 m		
Standing long jump	Nancy Cowperthwaite-Phillips	2.49 m		
Shot put	Adele Tischler (TCH)	13.52 m	Jackie MacDonald (CAN)	Louis Testa
Basketball throw	Catherine Walsh	101 ft 6 in (30.93 m)		
