= 1952 USA Outdoor Track and Field Championships =

American athletics championship event

- Dates: 20–21 June (men); 29 June (women); 5 October (pentathlon)
- Host city: Long Beach, California (men); Waterbury, Connecticut (women); Houston, Texas (pentathlon)
- Venue: Veterans Memorial Stadium (men); Municipal Stadium (women)
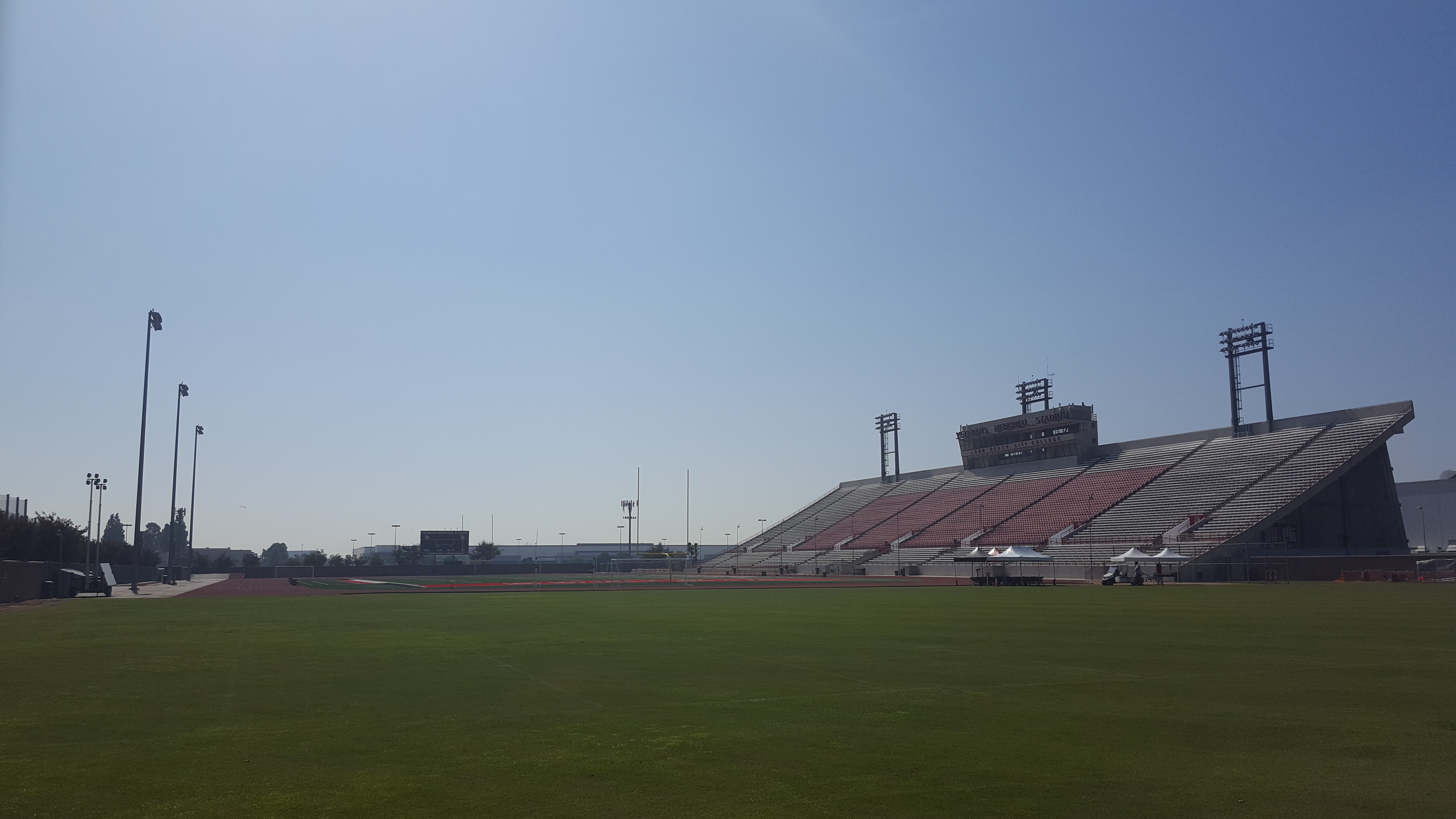

The 1952 USA Outdoor Track and Field Championships were organized by the Amateur Athletic Union (AAU) and served as the national championships in outdoor track and field for the United States.

The men's edition was held at Veterans Memorial Stadium in Long Beach, California, and it took place 20–21 June. The women's meet was held separately at Municipal Stadium in Waterbury, Connecticut, on 29 June. The pentathlon was held on 5 October in Houston, Texas.

Both championships were held one week before their respective 1952 United States Olympic trials, with the exception of the men's 10,000 m which served as both the U.S. championships and Olympic selection event. There were winds up to 10 miles per hour (16 km/h) impacting the men's races and jumps. In the women's competition, Catherine Hardy became the first sprinter to win all three short sprints, sweeping the 50 m, 100 m, and 200 m.

== Results ==
=== Men ===
Event	Gold		Silver		Bronze	
100 m	Dean Smith	10.5	Alexander Burl	10.6	William Mathis	10.6
200 m	Andrew Stanfield	21.1	Ollie Matson	21.4	Charles Thomas	21.5
400 m	Malvin Whitfield	46.4	George Rhoden (JAM)	46.7	Richard Maiocco	47.5
800 m	Reginald Pearman	1:53.5	Leonard Truex	1:53.6	Robert McMillen	1:53.9
1500 m	Wesley Santee	3:49.3	Warren Dreutzler	3:52.3	Javier Montes	3:52.8
5000 m	Curt Stone	15:03.3	Charles Cappozzoli	15:07.2	Fred Wilt	15:15.5
10000 m	Curt Stone	30:33.4	Fred Wilt	30:41.2	Horace Ashenfelter	30:45.8
Marathon	Victor Dyrgall	2:38:28.4	Thomas Jones	2:42:22.2	Theodore Corbitt	2:43:23.0
110 m hurdles	Harrison Dillard	13.7	Jack Davis	13.9	Craig Dixon	14.0
200 m hurdles	Ralph Person	22.5 w				
400 m hurdles	Charley Moore	51.2	Don Halderman	52.2	Dewie Lee Yoder	52.2
3000 m steeplechase	Robert McMullen	9:25.3	Horace Ashenfelter	9:28.5	William Ashenfelter	9:29.6
3000 m walk	Henry Laskau	12:52.7				
High jump	Walter Davis	2.09 m	Arnold Betton	2.04 m	none awarded	
High jump	Walter Davis	2.09 m	Emery Barnes	2.04 m	none awarded	
Pole vault	Bob Richards	4.47 m	none awarded		George Mattos	4.37 m
Pole vault	Donald Laz	4.47 m	none awarded		George Mattos	4.37 m
Long jump	George Brown	7.85 m	Meredith Gourdine	7.50 m	Jerome Biffle	7.47 m
Triple jump	Walter Ashbaugh	15.46 m w	Sal Mazzoca	15.42 m w	George Shaw	15.26 m w
Shot put	Parry O'Brien	17.49 m	James Fuchs	17.36 m	Bernard Mayer	17.05 m
Discus throw	James Dillion	53.43 m	Fortune Gordien	52.67 m	Simeon Iness	51.73 m
Hammer throw	Thomas Bane	54.85 m	Clifford Blair	54.79 m	Samuel Felton	53.37 m
Javelin throw	William Miller	71.96 m	Cyrus Young	70.98 m	Robert Allison	67.02 m
Weight throw for distance	Henry Dreyer	40 ft 3 in (12.26 m)				
Pentathlon	Brayton Norton	3129 pts				
All-around decathlon	Raymond Bussard	5822 pts				
Decathlon	Robert Mathias	7829 pts	Milt Campbell	7055 pts	Floyd Simmons	6804 pts

=== Women ===
Event	Gold		Silver		Bronze	
50 m	Catherine Hardy	6.4	Barbara Jones		Sarah Pointer	
100 m	Catherine Hardy	12.3	Mae Faggs		Cynthia Robinson	
200 m	Catherine Hardy	25.5	Mae Faggs		Janet Moreau	
80 m hurdles	Constance Darnowski	12.1	Nancy Phillips		Theresa Manuel	
High jump	Marion Boos	1.51 m	Lula Bell	1.48 m	none awarded	
High jump	Marion Boos	1.51 m	Lolita Mauer	1.48 m	none awarded	
Long jump	Mabel Landry	5.52 m	Nancy Phillips	5.25 m	Barbara Jones	5.01 m
Long jump	Mabel Landry	5.52 m	Nancy Phillips	5.25 m	Jean Simmons	5.01 m
Shot put (8 lb)	Amelia Bert	11.50 m	Janet Dicks		Carolyn Nave	
Discus throw	Janet Dicks	34.94 m	Stanislawa Walasiewicz (POL)	33.31 m	Doris Sutter	33.27 m
Javelin throw	Marjorie Larney	38.63 m	Amelia Wershoven	38.36 m	Theresa Manuel	33.62 m
Javelin throw	Marjorie Larney	38.63 m	Amelia Wershoven	38.36 m	Janet Dicks	33.62 m
Baseball throw	Marion Brown Young	245 ft 11 in (74.95 m)				
Women's pentathlon	Stella Walasiewicz (POL)	2183 pts	Jo Culver	1588 pts	Helen Hale	1585 pts

== See also ==
- List of USA Outdoor Track and Field Championships winners (men)
- List of USA Outdoor Track and Field Championships winners (women)
