= 1957 USA Indoor Track and Field Championships =

National athletics championship event

- Dates: February 23 (men); April 6 (women)
- Host city: New York City, New York, United States (men); Cleveland, Ohio, United States (women)
- Venue: Madison Square Garden (men); Cleveland Arena (women)
- Level: Senior
- Type: Indoor
- Events: 20 (12 men's + 8 women's)

The 1957 USA Indoor Track and Field Championships were organized by the Amateur Athletic Union (AAU) and served as the national championships in indoor track and field for the United States.

The men's edition was held at Madison Square Garden in New York City, New York, and it took place February 23. The women's meet was held separately at the Cleveland Arena in Cleveland, Ohio, taking place April 6.

At the championships, the "daily double" of Ron Delany and Charlie Jenkins, both from Villanova, won the mile and 600 yards respectively.

== Medal summary ==
=== Men ===
| Event | Gold | | Silver | Bronze |
|---|---|---|---|---|
| 60 yards | Ira Murchison | 6.2 | | |
| 600 yards | Charles Jenkins Sr. | 1:10.4 | | |
| 1000 yards | Arnie Sowell | 2:12.6 | | |
| Mile run | Ron Delany (IRL) | 4:07.0 | Laszlo Tabori (HUN) | Fred Dwyer |
| 3 miles | John Macy (POL) | 13:57.4 | Alex Breckenridge | |
| 60 yards hurdles | Lee Calhoun | 7.2 | | |
| High jump | Phil Reavis | 2.07 m | | |
| Pole vault | Bob Richards | 4.65 m | | |
| Long jump | George Shaw | 7.54 m | | |
| Shot put | Parry O'Brien | 18.18 m | | |
| Weight throw | Bob Backus | 19.23 m | | |
| 1 mile walk | Henry Laskau | 6:39.7 | | |

=== Women ===
| Event | Gold | | Silver | Bronze |
|---|---|---|---|---|
| 50 yards | Isabelle Daniels | 5.7 | | |
| 100 yards | Barbara Jones | 11.3 | | |
| 220 yards | Lucinda Williams | 26.8 | | |
| 50 yards hurdles | Lauretta Foley | 7.1 | | |
| High jump | Ann Marie Flynn | 1.57 m | | |
| Standing long jump | Shirley Hereford | 2.65 m | | |
| Shot put | Marjorie Larney | 11.90 m | | |
| Basketball throw | Amelia Wershoven | 105 ft 9 1/2 in (32.24 m) | | |
