= 1951 USA Outdoor Track and Field Championships =

American athletics championship event

- Dates: 22–23 June (men); 12 August (women); 14 July (pentathlon)
- Host city: Berkeley, California (men, pentathlon); Waterbury, Connecticut (women)
- Venue: Edwards Stadium (men); Municipal Stadium (women)
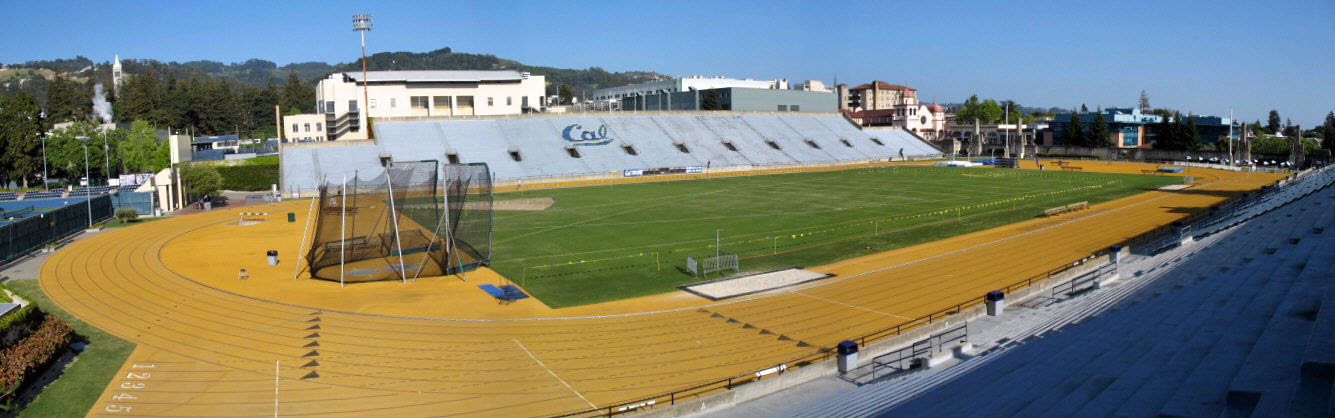

The 1951 USA Outdoor Track and Field Championships were organized by the Amateur Athletic Union (AAU) and served as the national championships in outdoor track and field for the United States.

The men's edition was held at Edwards Stadium in Berkeley, California, and it took place 22–23 June. The women's meet was held separately at Municipal Stadium in Waterbury, Connecticut, on 12 August. The pentathlon was held on 14 July also at Berkeley.

About 15,000 spectators attended the men's edition, which was one of the largest crowds in AAU history to that point. In the women's competition, Tuskegee Institute won the team title.

== Results ==
=== Men ===
Event	Gold		Silver		Bronze	
100 m	James Golliday	10.3	Robert Work	10.5	Rafael Fortun (CUB)	10.6
200 m straight	James Ford	20.8	Walt McKibben	21.0 e	Charles Thomas	21.1 e
400 m	George Rhoden (JAM)	46.0	Herbert McKenley (JAM)	46.6	Richard Maiocco	47.0
800 m	Malvin Whitfield	1:52.9	Roscoe Browne	1:53.0	Bob Chambers	1:54.0
1500 m	Leonard Truex	3:52.0	Warren Dreutzler	3:52.5	Jim Newcomb	3:52.8
5000 m	Fred Wilt	14:47.5	Wesley Santee	14:52.4	Herb Semper	14:55.1
10000 m	Curt Stone	32:30.7	Fred Wilt	32:30.9	Armand Osterberg	32:35.8
Marathon	Jesse Van Zant	2:37:12.5	John Lafferty	2:37:36.0	Walter Fedorick (CAN)	2:40.02
110 m hurdles	Richard Attlesey	13.8	Jack Davis	14.1	Craig Dixon	14.3
200 m hurdles straight	Ralph Person	23.2				
400 m hurdles	Charley Moore	51.4	Robert DeVinney	51.8	Jack Greenwood	53.8
3000 m steeplechase	Horace Ashenfelter	9:24.5	Curt Stone	9:54.1	Robert Kelly	10:03.1
3000 m walk	Henry Laskau	13:13.2				
High jump	Jay Lewis Hall	2.03 m	Herman Wyatt	2.00 m	Fred Pratley	1.93 m
High jump	Jay Lewis Hall	2.03 m	Herman Wyatt	2.00 m	Sid Ward	1.93 m
High jump	Jay Lewis Hall	2.03 m	Herman Wyatt	2.00 m	Herb Neff	1.93 m
High jump	Jay Lewis Hall	2.03 m	Herman Wyatt	2.00 m	Ernest Shelton	1.93 m
High jump	Jay Lewis Hall	2.03 m	Herman Wyatt	2.00 m	Eric Roberts	1.93 m
High jump	Jay Lewis Hall	2.03 m	Herman Wyatt	2.00 m	Connie Varneck	1.93 m
High jump	Jay Lewis Hall	2.03 m	Herman Wyatt	2.00 m	Charles Holding	1.93 m
High jump	Jay Lewis Hall	2.03 m	Herman Wyatt	2.00 m	Charles Hanger	1.93 m
High jump	Jay Lewis Hall	2.03 m	Herman Wyatt	2.00 m	Bernard Allard	1.93 m
High jump	Jay Lewis Hall	2.03 m	Herman Wyatt	2.00 m	Barney Dyer	1.93 m
High jump	Jay Lewis Hall	2.03 m	Herman Wyatt	2.00 m	Arnold Webb	1.93 m
High jump	Jay Lewis Hall	2.03 m	Herman Wyatt	2.00 m	Robert Gorden	1.93 m
Pole vault	Bob Richards	4.37 m	Walter Jensen	4.27 m	none awarded	
Pole vault	Bob Richards	4.37 m	Donald Laz	4.27 m	none awarded	
Pole vault	Bob Richards	4.37 m	Bobby Smith	4.27 m	none awarded	
Long jump	George Brown	7.53 m	Gaylord Bryan	7.36 m	Jesse Thomas	7.30 m
Triple jump	Gaylord Bryan	14.31 m	Sal Mazzoca	14.03 m	Francisco Castro (PUR)	13.87 m
Shot put	Parry O'Brien	17.00 m	James Fuchs	16.81 m	Darrow Hooper	16.19 m
Discus throw	Richard Doyle	53.50 m	Victor Frank	52.54 m	Taylor Lewis	49.97 m
Hammer throw	Samuel Felton	56.15 m	Henry Dreyer	55.68 m	Thomas Bane	52.06 m
Javelin throw	Bud Held	73.47 m	William Miller	71.27 m	Steve Seymour	69.70 m
Weight throw for distance	Henry Dreyer	41 ft 6 3/4 in (12.66 m)				
Pentathlon	Brayton Norton	3452 pts				
All-around decathlon	John Voight	5600 pts				
Decathlon	Bob Richards	7834 pts	Floyd Simmons	7361 pts	Otey Scruggs	7178 pts

=== Women ===
Event	Gold		Silver		Bronze	
50 m	Mary McNabb	6.6	Catherine Hardy		Dolores Dwyer	
100 m	Mary McNabb	12.2	Catherine Hardy		Jean Patton	
200 m	Jean Patton	25.4	Mae Faggs		Nell Jackson	
80 m hurdles	Nancy Phillips	12.2	Evelyn Lawler		Constance Darnowski	
High jump	Marion Boos	1.47 m	Lolita Mauer	1.45 m	none awarded	
High jump	Marion Boos	1.47 m	Oral Lee Allen	1.45 m	none awarded	
High jump	Marion Boos	1.47 m	Nancy Phillips	1.45 m	none awarded	
Long jump	Stanislawa Walasiewicz (POL)	5.26 m	Nancy Phillips	5.24 m	Evelyn Lawler	4.95 m
Shot put (8 lb)	Amelia Bert	12.57 m	Janet Dicks	11.01 m	Ramona Massey	10.89 m
Discus throw	Francis Kaszubski (POL)	36.89 m	Stanislawa Walasiewicz (POL)	33.32 m	Janet Dicks	33.27 m
Javelin throw	Francis Licata	36.59 m	Amelia Bert	36.09 m	Margaret Mates	34.22 m
Baseball throw	Amelia Wershoven	239 ft 1 3/4 in (72.89 m)				
Women's pentathlon	Stella Walasiewicz (POL)	1932 pts	Doris Sutter	1394 pts	Norrine Westby	1204 pts

== See also ==
- List of USA Outdoor Track and Field Championships winners (men)
- List of USA Outdoor Track and Field Championships winners (women)
