= Nancy Cowperthwaite-Phillips =

American track and field athlete (1921–2017)

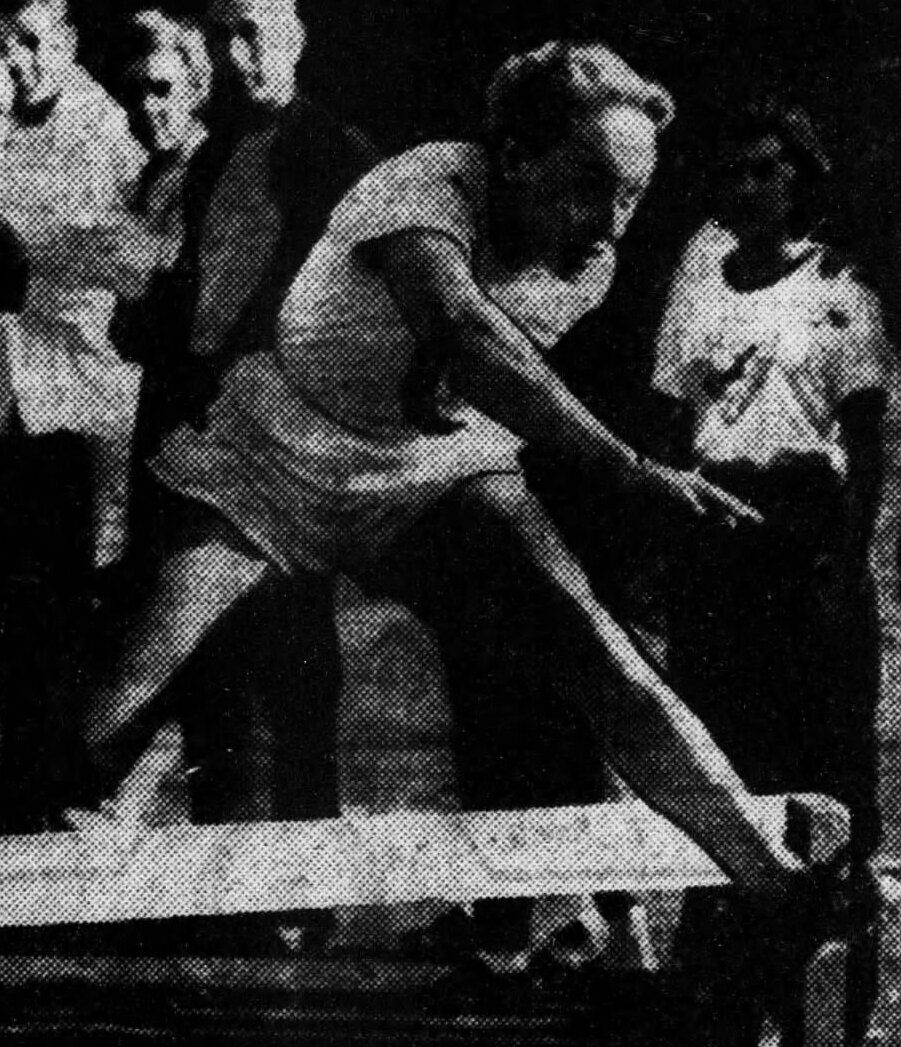
- Cowperthwaite in an advertisement for the 1952 The Washington Star invitational meet

Personal information
- Born: June 18, 1921
- Died: September 20, 2017 (aged 96)
- Height: 5 ft 6 in (168 cm)
- Weight: 125 lb (57 kg)

Sport
- Country: United States
- Sport: Athletics
- Events: 80 m hurdles High jump Long jump Pentathlon; Heptathlon
- Coached by: Harry Blaul

Achievements and titles
- Personal bests: 100 yards: 11.5; 100 m: 12.0; 50 yd hurdles: 7.1 NR (1953); 50 m hurdles: 6.9 WR (1948); 80 m hurdles: 11.8 (1951); Long jump: 5.80 m (1953)
Medal record
Women's athletics
Representing the United States
Pan American Games
Bronze medal – third place	1951 Buenos Aires	80 m hurdles

Nancy Cowperthwaite-Phillips (June 18, 1921 – September 20, 2017) was an American socialite and track and field competitor. Born into a wealthy family with a US$30 million inheritance (equivalent to $402,008,310 in 2025), Cowperthwaite was a multi-sport athlete who won 12 national titles at the USA Indoor Track and Field Championships in sprinting and jumping events – the most all-time titles of any American as of 2026.

Cowperthwaite set a world record in the 50 meters hurdles in 1948 with a 6.9-second clocking. Though she gave up her 1948 Olympics spot and never made another Olympic team, she represented the United States at the 1951 Pan American Games, winning the bronze medal in the 80 m hurdles. Cowperthwaite continued competing following her husband's death in a 1954 airplane crash, qualifying for the 1955 Pan American Games in the 80 m hurdles.

== Personal life ==
Nancy Cowperthwaite was born on June 18, 1921, to parents Nathalie Vanderhoof Cowperthwaite and Morgan Cowperthwaite, an insurance broker. Her father died when she was 11 years old in 1933. As a part of the New York Social Register, her family was considered socially prominent and were considered pioneers in the furniture business in New York. She had a sister, Jean Cowperthwaite, and two brothers, Morgan Cowperthwaite Jr. and John Knox Cowperthwaite. Her uncle was Gustave Maurice Heckscher and she was a cousin of August Heckscher II via her grandfather Harmon B. Vanderhoef.

Cowperthwaite grew up in Far Hills, New Jersey and was also reported as hailing from Bedminster, New Jersey and Pattenburg, New Jersey. She attended Community of St John Baptist school in Mendham, New Jersey and then attended the private boarding school Miss Porter's School in Farmington, Connecticut. While attending Miss Porter's, the school forbid women from running in public.

She rode a horse named Chester and was successful in local equestrian sport. She had an Afghan Hound named Stubby and a Beagle named Susie. After graduating in 1938, she joined Manhattan's German-American Athletic Club.

In addition to her track and field accomplishments, Cowperthwaite also participated in swimming, foxhunting, skating, skiing, tennis, hiking, and dancing. She also played piano and collected records, did art study, and was a trained pilot, learning to fly a Piper J-3 Cub. She volunteered at Red Cross and Bundles for Britain. During World War II, she worked a tractor on a New Jersey farm to help the United States World War II effort. In coverage of her athletics career, media compared her look to that of Margaret Sullavan.

Prior to her marriage, she lived on Mendham Roard in Bernardsville, New Jersey. Around 1948, Cowperthwaite's grandfather left a US$30 million (equivalent to $402,008,310 in 2025) inheritance for her. She married Joseph Theodore "Ted" Phillips on May 21, 1948. Following her marriage, she lived in Bloomsbury, New Jersey and worked in the airport business with her husband. She initially kept her last name Cowperthwaite for athletic purposes.

Ted Phillips died in an airplane crash on June 21, 1954. In April 1955, Cowperthwaite was sued for US$50,000 by the parents of Fred Miller, who was electrocuted to death while trying to save her husband following his airplane crash. She lived alone in a bungalow on Race Hill Road, Guilford, Connecticut through the 1990s where she did not even own a television to watch the 1992 Summer Olympics.

Phillips also was a traveler and did hiking and biking safaris in more than a dozen countries. She inherited her family's wealth but cleaned houses as a side job in her later years. She died on September 20, 2017, in Madison, Connecticut.

== Career ==
=== Early career ===
Phillips specialized in sprinting, hurdling, and jumping events. She trained at the Blair Academy track as well as with the German-American AC in Brooklyn. She said, "I had wanted to run longer distance events, but in those days 220s were the longest women could run. Longer than that was bad for us, we were told". Due to her prominent family, Phillips was known as the "hurdler heiress". Phillips said of her success, "It was considered queer for a woman to compete in track when I was a kid. We were looked at as rather odd. You didn’t tell people you ran track in those days. I did pretty well, but there wasn’t much competition then". Her marks during the early-to-mid 1940s were considered globally competitive, but as the 1940 and 1944 Olympics were canceled due to World War II she could not compete internationally.

Cowperwaithe-Phillips competed in track and field events as early as 1939, winning the 60 yards, baseball throw, and high jump at a Far Hills Athletic Club meeting. She was a USA Junior Outdoor Track & Field Championships winner in the high jump. She trained in hurdles for the 1940 USA Outdoor Track and Field Championships. At the event, she placed 2nd in the 80 meters hurdles behind German-American AC teammate Sybil Cooper. She was named to the American team for the 1940 Summer Olympics before they were canceled due to World War II.

Cowperwaithe entered in the 80 m hurdles, long jump, javelin throw, and high jump at the 1941 USA Outdoor Track and Field Championships. She finished 4th in the hurdles event. By August 1941, she had already broken several national records in exhibitions.

She continued representing the Brookyln German-American AC in 1942, finishing runner-up again in the 80 m hurdles at the 1942 USA Outdoor Track and Field Championships.

She ran 60 m hurdles in 11.8 seconds in 1943. Representing the Metropolitan A.A.U. Group of New York, she approached world record marks in practice. She won five events at the 1943 Metropolitan Outdoor Championships, in the 80 m hurdles, 150 yards, long jump, baseball throw, and javelin throw. In December 1943, she was named to the first ever All-American women's track and field team.

At the 1944 USA Outdoor Track and Field Championships, Cowperthwaite was runner-up in the high jump. She led in the 80 m hurdles mid-race but tripped over a hurdle and did not finish.

=== 1945 to 1948 ===
By January 1945, Cowperthwaite had already won Metropolitan titles in sprints, hurdles, high jump, javelin throw, and baseball throw. She won the 60 yards and 220 yards at the first Metropolitan Indoor Championships to feature both men and women later that month. In February, Cowperwaithe won the 60 yards at the 1945 Millrose Games. The performance was later ranked the 82nd best performance in Fort Washington Avenue Armory history. Cowperwaithe won her first indoor national title at the 1945 USA Indoor Track and Field Championships, placing first in the 50 yards hurdles and third in the high jump. Cowperthwaite lost her rematch against Lilly Purifoy at the 1945 USA Outdoor Track and Field Championships, finishing runner-up in the hurdles.

She was again second to Purifoy at the 1946 USA Indoor Track and Field Championships in the hurdles. Cowperthwaite represented the U.S. in a United States v. Canada international, where she was runner-up in the high jump and ran on the winning American relay team. At the 1946 USA Outdoor Track and Field Championships, Cowperthwaite won the 80 m hurdles and was second in the high jump. She wore only one shoe in the high jump, saying, "I get a better takeoff with my bare foot".

At the 1947 USA Outdoor Track and Field Championships, Cowperthwaite won the 80 m hurdles and was runner-up in the long jump.

In January 1948, Cowperthwaite tied the world record for the indoor 50 meters hurdles, running 7.3 seconds to equal Purifoy's mark from the previous year. She broke the record outright in February, running 6.9 seconds in Jersey City. She was considered a favorite for the 1948 Olympic team, and announced that as her goal at the beginning of the year. At the 1948 USA Indoor Track and Field Championships held in April, Cowperthwaite won the standing long jump and running long jump, though she finished just 3rd in her signature 50 m hurdles.

At the 1948 USA Outdoor Track and Field Championships, held one week before the separate Olympic trials, Cowperthwaite was only 4th in the 80 m hurdles. Phillips later placed runner-up in the 80 m hurdles and 3rd in the long jump at the 1948 United States Olympic trials in Providence, Rhode Island, qualifying her to represent the U.S. in both events at the first post-war Olympiad. However, she declined her spot due to having been recently married and not thinking she would be able to beat the European competition. The refusal, originally reported as for business reasons for her husband's work in Easton, Pennsylvania, was considered a "rarity in Olympic history". Sportswriter Sam Lacy speculated that Cowperthwaite's true reason for skipping the team was because nine of the eleven Olympic sports had been won by Black girls and that Cowperthwaite, as a white athlete, "feared she'd be too lonesome". However, he apologized one week later after hearing from a coach that Cowperthwaite "went out of her way to aid colored girls" and made contributions so that some Black athletes were able to travel to the Olympic trials finals in Providence. It was later reported that Cowperthwaite was one of Tuskegee hurdler Evelyn Lawler's best friends.

=== 1949 to 1952 ===
Cowperthwaite was featured on the cover of the meet program for the 1949 USA Outdoor Track and Field Championships, sold by the Odessa Shriners club. At the championships, she was 6th in the 80 m hurdles, 4th in the high jump, and 6th in the long jump.

At the 1950 USA Indoor Track and Field Championships, Cowperthwaite won the 50 yards hurdles, the standing long jump, and was runner-up in the high jump. The meet brought her total national title count to nine. Outdoors at the 1950 national championships, she was runner-up in three events (80 m hurdles, high jump, and long jump), qualifying her to represent the U.S. in athletics at the 1951 Pan American Games the following year in all three events. At the first women's pentathlon national championships in October 1950, Cowperthwaite finished 3rd behind Stella Walsh and Dolores Dwyer.

Cowperthwaite won the 50 yards hurdles and high jump at the 1951 USA Indoor Track and Field Championships, running 7.2 seconds in the former event.

The following month, she traveled to Buenos Aires, Argentina, for the Pan American Games, entered in the hurdles, high jump, and long jump. On March 2, she won her 80 m hurdles heat in 12.0 seconds to qualify for the finals. She won a bronze medal in the finals on March 3, running 12.1 seconds behind Chilean athletes Eliana Gaete and Marion Huber. That same day, Cowperthwaite also finished 8th in the high jump finals with a 1.35-meter mark. On March 6, Cowperthwaite finished 6th in the long jump with a 5.03 m best.

In June 1951, Cowperthwaite ran an 11.8-second 80 m hurdles personal best in Downingtown, Pennsylvania, finishing one tenth of a second away from the existing American record. At the 1951 USA Outdoor Track and Field Championships, she won the 80 m hurdles title and was runner-up in the long jump and high jump.

Cowperthwaite entered the 1952 USA Indoor Track and Field Championships in both the high jump and 50 yards hurdles. She won the hurdles event, anchored her German-American A.C. club to a 4 × 70 yards shuttle hurdles relay win in 41.5 seconds, and was 3rd in the high jump. At the 1952 USA Outdoor Track and Field Championships, Cowperthwaite was third in the high jump and runner-up in the 80 m hurdles, long jump, and shuttle hurdles relay.

Cowperthwaite was considered a favorite to make the 1952 Summer Olympic team in the hurdles. She led the 80 m hurdles at the 1952 United States Olympic trials by two yards at the 60-meter mark, but she crashed into the ninth hurdle and fell to the cinder track, failing to make the team. She was bruised by the fall and knocked over third-placer Caroline McDermott's hurdle, leading her to mount an unsuccessful protest for inclusion to the team (only winner Constance Darnowski – who Cowperthwaite had assisted in coaching – was selected). Cowperthwaite finished 3rd in the Trials long jump with a 4.89 m mark, but only the winner Mabel Landry was selected to compete in that event. Three months later, Cowperthwaite won the Eastern States women's pentathlon championships with 1,283 points.

=== 1953 to 1956 ===
At the 1953 USA Indoor Track and Field Championships, Cowperthwaite ran a 50 yards hurdles time of 7.1 seconds to set a new American record over the distance and win the national indoor title. That summer at the 1953 USA Outdoor Track and Field Championships, Cowperthwaite won the 80 m hurdles, was runner-up in the long jump, and was 4th in the high jump. In October she was runner-up at the Metropolitan pentathlon championships, winning the long jump portion and scoring 1,161 points overall. During the outdoor season she also set an American long jump record of 19 ft 0 1/2 in (5.8 m). She was a finalist for the 1953 James E. Sullivan Award, finishing 8th among nominees.

Cowperthwaite entered the 1954 USA Indoor Track and Field Championships to defend her hurdles title, but did not start the 100 yards and did not appear in event results. She was 3rd in the women's exhibition 100 yards at the men's 1954 USA Outdoor Track and Field Championships in June, but due to her husband's death later that month, she did not compete at the official women's outdoor championships in July.

Cowperthwaite was runner-up in both the 70 yards hurdles and the high jump at the 1955 Star Athletics Games in January. At the 1955 USA Indoor Track and Field Championships, which also served as the 1955 Pan American Games U.S. trials, Cowperthwaite won the 80 m hurdles in 12.0 seconds and was runner-up in the long jump, qualifying for the Games in the former event. She anchored the winning 4 × 160 yards relay women's exhibition event at the 1955 men's national championships. In the 1955 Pan American Games 80 m semi-final, Cowperthwaite finished 4th in her heat with a time of 12.07 seconds and did not advance to the finals. She won another long jump title at the 1955 USA Outdoor Track and Field Championships and was 3rd in the 80 m hurdles. In October, Cowperthwaite was 3rd in the national pentathlon championships with 3,388 points.

At the 1956 USA Indoor Track and Field Championships, held in conjunction with the Washington Star Games Cowperthwaite had previously competed at, Copwethwaite again won the standing long jump. She qualified for the hurdles final and held a lead until the final hurdle, when she tripped and finished in last place. Her semi-final time led the qualifiers and was one tenth faster than the eventual winning time. At the 1956 USA Outdoor Track and Field Championships, one week before the Olympic trials, Cowperthwaite's long jump American record was broken by Margaret Matthews. Cowperthwaite's only result was 5th in that event, jumping 17 ft 11 in (5.46 m). Cowperthwaite was not listed at the 1956 United States Olympic trials one week later and did not qualify for the 1956 Olympic team.

=== 1957 to 1992 ===
Cowperthwaite entered the 1957 USA Indoor Track and Field Championships attempting to defend her long jump title and win back a title in the hurdles, despite the fact that three athletes had already surpassed her winning long jump mark from 1956. At the meet, Cowperthwaite was 3rd in the high jump, 3rd in the 50 yards hurdles, and runner-up in the long jump.

Outdoors, Cowperthwaite competed at invitationals in May and June. At the 1957 USA Outdoor Track and Field Championships, she finished 4th in the 80 m hurdles.

She continued competing in 1958, running at the Washington Star meet and winning the 80 m hurdles and long jump at the New Jersey Amateur Athletic Union state championships. At the 1958 USA Indoor Track and Field Championships, Cowperthwaite was 3rd in her hurdles heat and did not make the final but was 4th in the long jump finals. In 1963, her 50 m hurdles world record was broken by Tammy Davis.

In 1992, Cowperthwaite still led an active lifestyle, running 4 miles (6.4 km) per week and swimming 2,500 yards (2,300 m) three times per week at the Middletown, Connecticut YMCA building. She set several masters swimming national records.
