= 1955 USA Indoor Track and Field Championships =

National athletics championship event

- Dates: February 19 (men); February 5 (women)
- Host city: New York City, New York, United States (men); Chicago, Illinois, United States (women)
- Venue: Madison Square Garden (men); Henry Crown Field House (women)
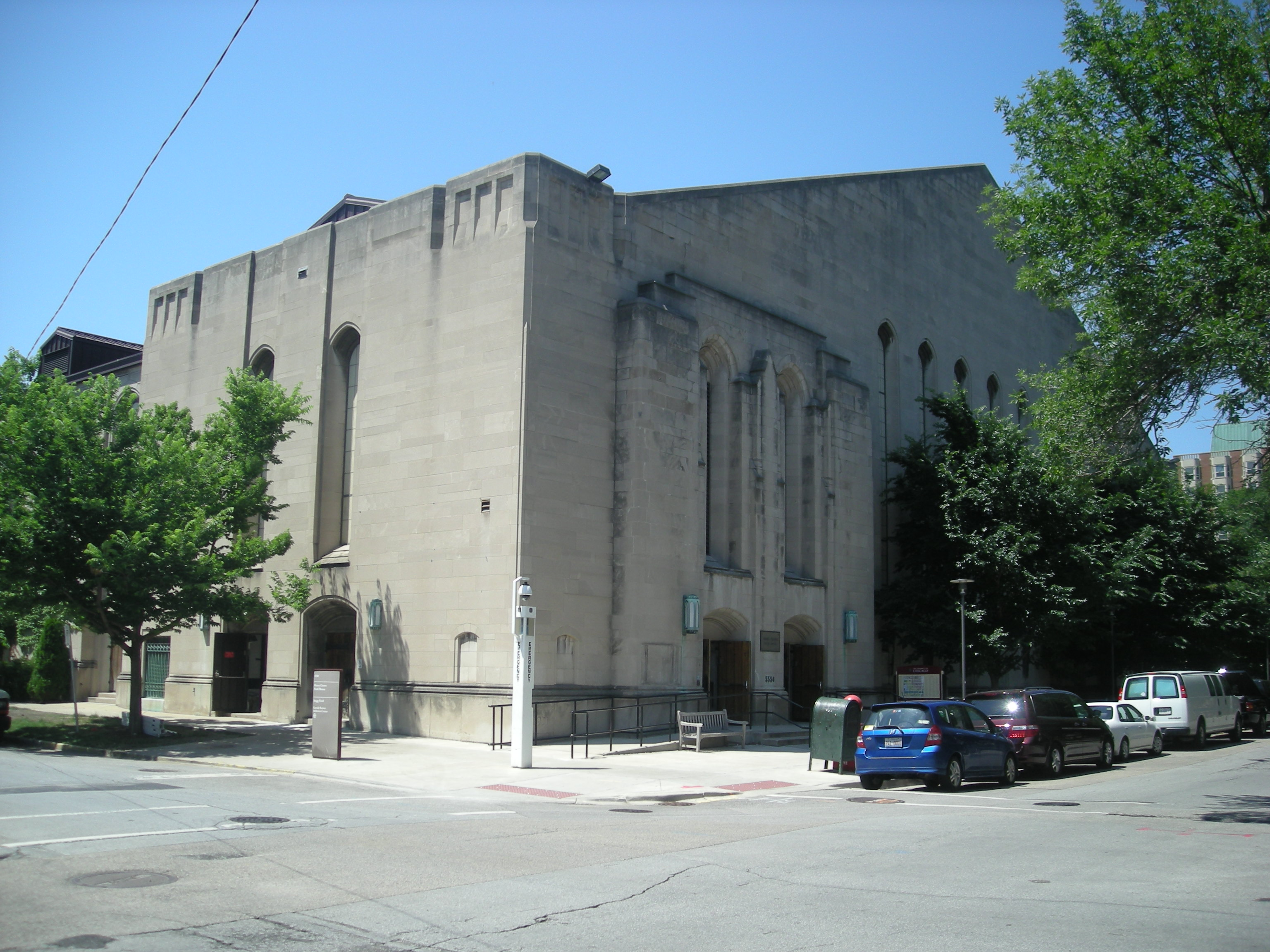
- Level: Senior
- Type: Indoor
- Events: 22 (12 men's + 10 women's)

The 1955 USA Indoor Track and Field Championships were organized by the Amateur Athletic Union (AAU) and served as the national championships in indoor track and field for the United States.

The men's edition was held at Madison Square Garden in New York City, New York, and it took place February 19. The women's meet was held separately at the Henry Crown Field House in Chicago, Illinois, taking place February 5.

The women's meeting served as a qualifier for the U.S. team at the 1955 Pan American Games. Because of this, the discus throw and javelin throw were contested at the meet for the first time.

== Medal summary ==
=== Men ===
Event	Gold		Silver	Bronze
60 yards	John Haines	6.1		
600 yards	Charles Jenkins Sr.	1:11.9		
1000 yards	Arnie Sowell	2:08.2		
Mile run	Wes Santee	4:07.9		
3 miles	Horace Ashenfelter	13:54.0		
60 yards hurdles	Harrison Dillard	7.3		
High jump	Lewis Hall	2.05 m		
High jump	Ernie Shelton	2.05 m		
Pole vault	Bob Richards	4.67 m		
Long jump	Roslyn Range	7.64 m		
Shot put	Parry O'Brien	18.12 m		
Weight throw	Bob Backus	18.40 m		
1 mile walk	Henry Laskau	6:30.4		

=== Women ===
Event	Gold		Silver	Bronze
60 m	Isabelle Daniels	7.9		
100 m	Barbara Jones	12.3		
220 yards	Alfrances Lyman	26.2		
80 m hurdles	Nancy Cowperthwaite-Phillips	12.0		
High jump	Mildred McDaniel	1.57 m		
Standing long jump	Shirley Hereford	2.72 m		
Shot put	Lois Testa	11.45 m		
Discus throw	Marjorie Larney	122 ft 2 in (37.23 m)		
Javelin throw	Amelia Wershoven	138 ft 10 in (42.31 m)		
Basketball throw	Amelia Wershoven	98 ft 2 in (29.92 m)		
