= 1951 USA Indoor Track and Field Championships =

National athletics championship event

- Dates: February 17 (men); February 12 (women)
- Host city: New York City, New York, United States
- Venue: Madison Square Garden (men); 2nd Engineers Armory (women)
- Level: Senior
- Type: Indoor
- Events: 20 (12 men's + 8 women's)

The 1951 USA Indoor Track and Field Championships were organized by the Amateur Athletic Union (AAU) and served as the national championships in indoor track and field for the United States.

The men's edition was held at Madison Square Garden in New York City, New York, and it took place February 17. The women's meet was held separately on February 12 at the 2nd Engineers Armory.

The women's meet was held in conjunction with the men's USA Junior Outdoor Track & Field Championships that year.

== Medal summary ==
=== Men ===
| Event | Gold | | Silver | Bronze |
|---|---|---|---|---|
| 60 yards | Ed Conwell | 6.2 | | |
| 600 yards | Hugo Maiocco | 1:12.4 | | |
| 1000 yards | Roscoe Browne | 2:14.0 | | |
| Mile run | Fred Wilt | 4:09.4 | | |
| 3 miles | Curt Stone | 14:12.8 | | |
| 60 yards hurdles | Harrison Dillard | 7.4 | | |
| High jump | John Heintzmann | 1.97 m | | |
| High jump | Jack Razetto | 1.97 m | | |
| High jump | Josh Williamson | 1.97 m | | |
| Pole vault | Bob Richards | 4.57 m | | |
| Long jump | Andy Stanfield | 7.43 m | | |
| Shot put | Jim Fuchs | 17.66 m | | |
| Weight throw | Thomas Bane | 18.09 m | | |
| 1 mile walk | Henry Laskau | 6:27.0 | | |

=== Women ===
| Event | Gold | | Silver | Bronze |
|---|---|---|---|---|
| 50 yards | Catherine Hardy | 6.3 | | |
| 100 yards | Jean Patton | 11.2 | | |
| 220 yards | Mae Faggs | 26.9 | | |
| 50 yards hurdles | Nancy Cowperthwaite-Phillips | 7.2 | | |
| High jump | Marion Boos | 1.49 m | | |
| High jump | Nancy Cowperthwaite-Phillips | 1.49 m | | |
| Standing long jump | Janet Moreau | 2.64 m | | |
| Shot put | Frances Kaszubski | 11.92 m | | |
| Basketball throw | Marion Barone | 93 ft 0 in (28.34 m) | | |
