= Donnis (name) =

Donnis is a unisex given name. Notable persons with the name include:

- Donnis Churchwell (1936–2010), American football player
- Donnis Thompson (1933–2009), American athletic director and physical education professor
- Donnis, stage name of the American rapper Ladonnis Decurtis Crump (born 1984)
