= 1945 USA Outdoor Track and Field Championships =

American athletics championship event

- Dates: 29–30 June (men); 30 June (women)
- Host city: New York City, New York (men); Harrisburg, Pennsylvania (women)
- Venue: Downing Stadium (men); Fager Field (women)
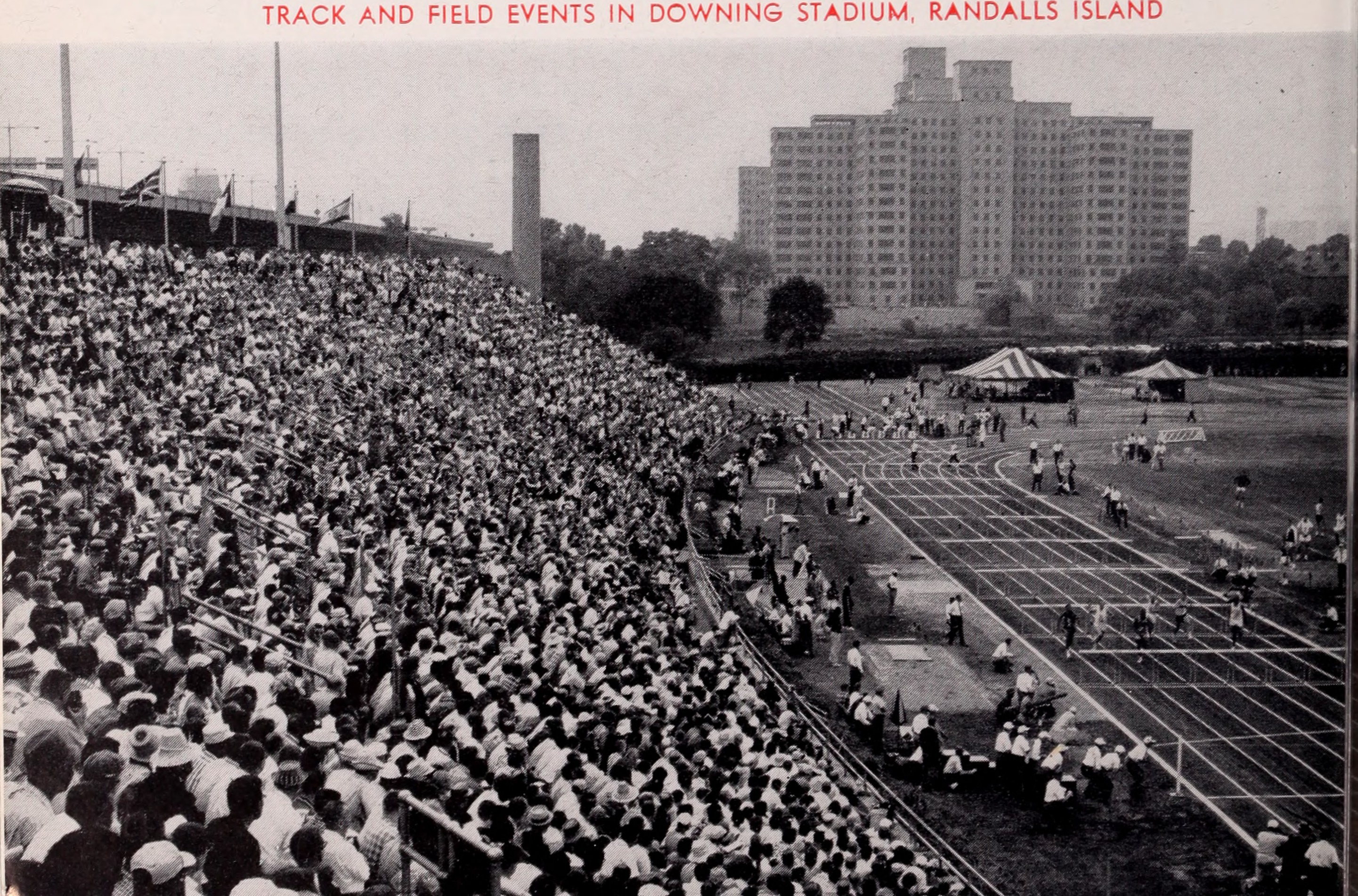

The 1945 USA Outdoor Track and Field Championships were organized by the Amateur Athletic Union (AAU) and served as the national championships in outdoor track and field for the United States.

The men's edition was held at Downing Stadium in New York City, New York, and it took place 29–30 June. The women's meet was held separately at Fager Field in Harrisburg, Pennsylvania, on 30 June.

At the men's championships, Barney Ewell broke the meeting record in the 100 m. In the women's competition, Tuskegee Institute won its second consecutive team title.

== Results ==
=== Men ===
Event	Gold		Silver		Bronze	
100 m	Norwood Ewell	10.3	Perry Samuels	4 yards behind	Rudy Nedd	
200 m	Elmore Harris	21.9	Robert Crowson		George Guida	
400 m	Herbert McKenley (JAM)	48.4	James Herbert	48.4	John Taylor	48.4
800 m	Robert Kelley	1:54.1	Stanton Callender	10 yards behind	David Smith	
1500 m	Roland Sink	3:58.4	Tom Quinn	10 yards behind	Jack Dianetti	14 yards behind 2nd
5000 m	John Kandl	16:14.4	Henry Walsh		Benny Mannix	
10000 m	Theodore Vogel	35:30.7	John A. Kelley		John Kersnason	
Marathon	Charles Robbins	2:37.14	John A. Kelley	2:40.27	Robert Rankine (CAN)	2:41.25
110 m hurdles	Charles Morgan	14.9	August Erfurth		Oris Erwin	
200 m hurdles	Ronald Frazier	24.0				
400 m hurdles	Oris Erwin	53.7	Hubert Gates		Jack Morris	
3000 m steeplechase	James Wisner	10:00.6	Walter Soltow		William Berger	
2 miles walk	Sam Bleifer	14:27.5				
High jump	Joshua Williamson	1.97 m	none awarded		none awarded	
High jump	Lester Howe	1.97 m	none awarded		none awarded	
High jump	Richard Schnacke	1.97 m	none awarded		none awarded	
High jump	David Albritton	1.97 m	none awarded		none awarded	
Pole vault	Richmond Morcom	4.11 m	none awarded		John Schmidt	3.96 m
Pole vault	Robert Phelps	4.11 m	none awarded		Milton Padway	3.96 m
Pole vault	Robert Phelps	4.11 m	none awarded		Ray Kring	3.96 m
Long jump	Herb Douglas	7.32 m	Eulace Peacock	7.29 m	Ted Haese	7.15 m
Triple jump	Burton Cox	13.99 m	Don Barksdale	13.88 m	Charles Barnes	13.65 m
Shot put	Bill Bangert	16.10 m	Earl Audet	15.74 m	Edward Quirk	15.45 m
Discus throw	John Donaldson	46.07 m	Bill Bangert	45.16 m	Fortune Gordien	44.54 m
Hammer throw	Henry Dreyer	50.89 m	Gantt Miller	48.78 m	Irving Folwartshny	48.70 m
Javelin throw	Frank Earl Marshall	65.63 m	Edsel Wibbels	62.20 m	Edward Thompson	54.56 m
Weight throw for distance	Henry Dreyer	35 ft 2 in (10.71 m)				
Pentathlon	Eulace Peacock	3148 pts				
Decathlon	Charles Beaudry	5886 pts	Charles Morgan	5850 pts	Richard Schnacke	5623 pts

=== Women ===
Event	Gold		Silver		Bronze	
50 m	Alice Coachman	6.5	Lillian Young		Rowena Harrison	
100 m	Alice Coachman	12.0	Stanislawa Walasiewicz (POL)		Jean Lowe	
200 m	Stanislawa Walasiewicz (POL)	26.6	Nell Jackson		Gwendolyn Taylor	
80 m hurdles	Lillie Purifoy	12.5	Nancy Cowperthwaite		Marie Wingo	
High jump	Alice Coachman	1.52 m	Marie Wingo	1.37 m	none awarded	
High jump	Alice Coachman	1.52 m	Nancy Cowperthwaite	1.37 m	none awarded	
Long jump	Stanislawa Walasiewicz (POL)	5.56 m	Rowena Harrison	5.42 m	Lillian Young	4.93 m
Shot put (8 lb)	Frances Gorn-Sobczak (POL)	11.52 m	Helen Steward	10.95 m	Dorothy Dodson	10.88 m
Discus throw	Frances Gorn-Sobczak (POL)	31.41 m	Hattie Turner	30.15 m	Dorothy Dodson	29.94 m
Javelin throw	Dorothy Dodson	38.05 m	Marian Twining	35.02 m	Peggy Anderson	32.98 m
Baseball throw	Marion Twining	237 ft 9 in (72.46 m)				

== See also ==
- List of USA Outdoor Track and Field Championships winners (men)
- List of USA Outdoor Track and Field Championships winners (women)
