= 1942 USA Outdoor Track and Field Championships =

American athletics championship event

- Dates: 19–20 June (men); 4 July (women)
- Host city: New York City, New York (men); Ocean City, New Jersey (women)
- Venue: Downing Stadium (men); Carey Stadium (women)
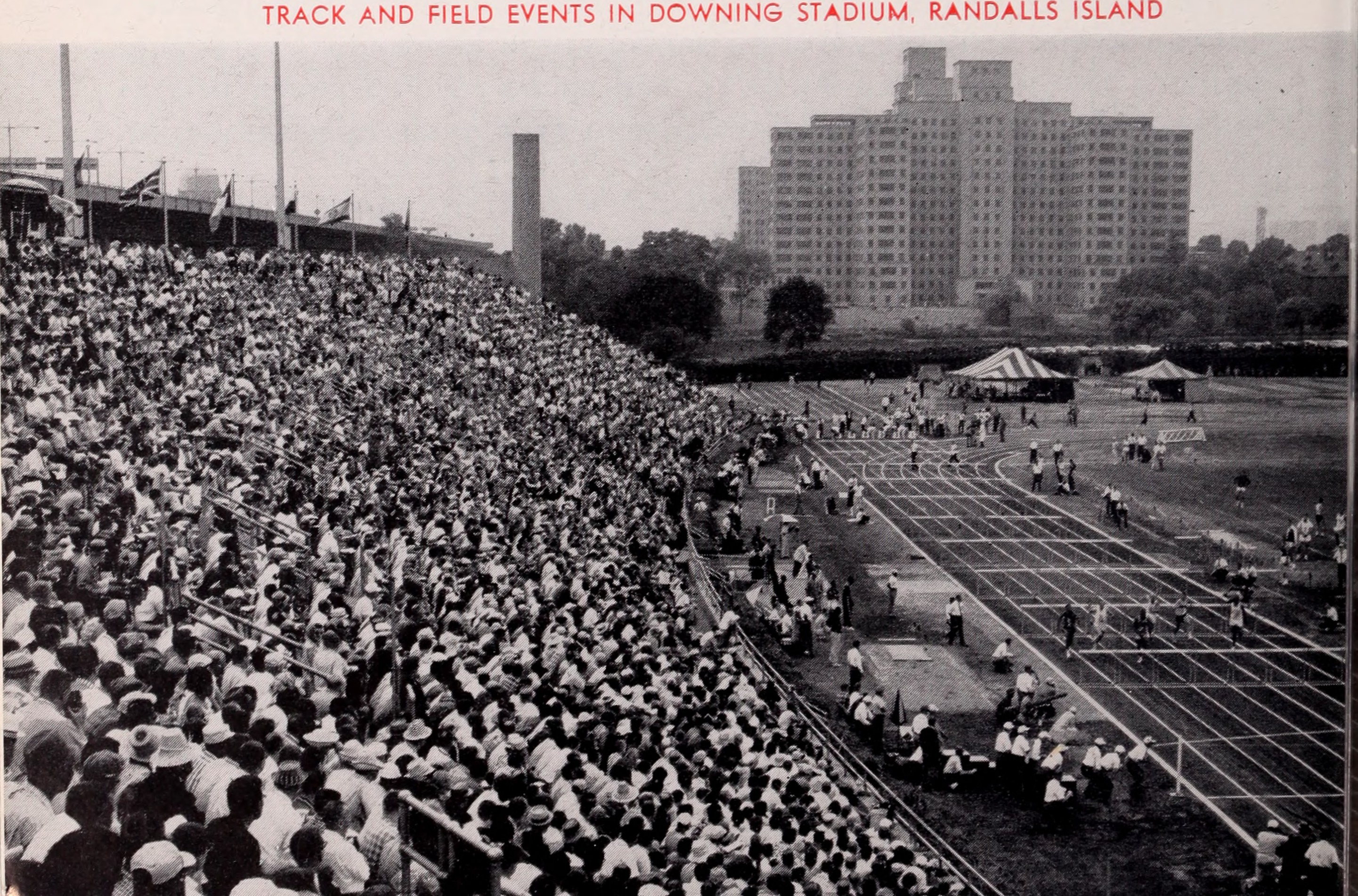

The 1942 USA Outdoor Track and Field Championships were organized by the Amateur Athletic Union (AAU) and served as the national championships in outdoor track and field for the United States.

The men's edition was held at Downing Stadium in New York City, New York, and it took place 19–20 June. The women's meet was held separately at Carey Stadium in Ocean City, New Jersey, on 4 July.

At the men's championships, only the pole vault and weight throw meet records were broken due to World War II. The women's competition also suffered due to gas rationing from the war, although Stella Walsh won the maximum number of events in the 200 m, long jump, and discus throw.

== Results ==
=== Men ===
Event	Gold		Silver		Bronze	
100 m	Harold Davis	10.5	Edward Greenidge	10.7 e	Herbert Thompson	
200 m straight	Harold Davis	20.9	Edward Greenidge		Charles Shaw	
400 m	Cliff Bourland	46.7	John Wachtler	47.3	Hubert Kerns	
800 m	John Borican	1:51.2	William Lyda	1:51.5	Lewis Smith	1:53.8
1500 m	Gilbert Dodds	3:50.2	Leroy Weed	3:51.4	Leslie MacMitchell	3:52.5
5000 m	Gregory Rice	14:39.7	Art Cazares		Robert Madrid	
10000 m	Joseph McCluskey	32:38.3	Fred Wilt		Herman Goffberg	
Marathon	Fred McGlone	2:37.54	John A. Kelley	2:42.21	Gerard Cote (CAN)	2:43.59
110 m hurdles	Bill Cummins	14.1	Joe Batiste		Robert Wright	
400 m hurdles	Walter Smith	52.0	Bill Cummins	52.2	Oris Erwin	52.3
3000 m steeplechase	George DeGeorge	9:16.5	Forrest Efaw		Joseph McCluskey	
High jump	Adam Berry	2.00 m	Richmond Morcom	1.98 m	Joshua Williamson	1.93 m
Pole vault	Cornelius Warmerdam	4.63 m	Jack DeField	4.37 m	Earle Meadows	4.27 m
Pole vault	Cornelius Warmerdam	4.63 m	Jack DeField	4.37 m	Harold Hunt	4.27 m
Long jump	Billy Brown	7.40 m	William Steele	7.32 m	Clarence Lewis	7.27 m
Triple jump	Billy Brown	14.92 m	Ruudi Toomsalu	13.73 m	Clarence Lewis	13.75 m
Shot put	Alfred Blozis	16.37 m	Carl Merritt	15.23 m	Thomas Montgomery	15.10 m
Discus throw	Robert Fitch	50.85 m	Philip Fox	49.68 m	Archie Harris	49.34 m
Hammer throw	Chester Cruikshank	52.94 m	Irving Folwartshny	51.40 m	Edmund Styrna	50.01 m
Javelin throw	Boyd Brown	66.03 m	Martin Biles	65.63 m	Robert Biles	65.02 m
Decathlon	William Terwilliger	6802 pts	William Watson	6076 pts	Herbert Matter	5963 pts
200 m hurdles	Robert Wright	23.5				
3000 m walk	John Connolly	14:16.3				
Weight throw for distance	Frank Berst	11.97 m				
All-around decathlon	Joshua Williamson	6031 pts				

=== Women ===
Event	Gold		Silver	Bronze
50 m	Jeanette Jones	6.7	Janet Ellicott (CAN)	Mamie Taylor
100 m	Alice Coachman	12.1	Rowena Harrison	Jean Lowe
200 m	Stanislawa Walasiewicz (POL)	25.4	Jean Kaplan	Katherine Geary
80 m hurdles	Lillie Purifoy	12.6	Nancy Cowperthwaite	Leila Perry
High jump	Alice Coachman	1.42 m	Norma Jeffrey	Frances Gorn-Sobczak (POL)
Long jump	Stanislawa Walasiewicz (POL)	5.46 m	Rowena Harrison	Betty Moore
Shot put (8 lb)	Ramona Harris	37 ft 10 1/2 in (11.54 m)	Dorothy Dodson	Frances Gorn-Sobczak (POL)
Discus throw	Stanislawa Walasiewicz (POL)	33.82 m	Frances Gorn-Sobczak (POL)	Anne Pallo
Javelin throw	Dorothy Dodson	37.45 m	Marie Sostar	Marian Twining
Baseball throw	Irene Romano	259 ft 7 in (79.12 m)		

== See also ==
- List of USA Outdoor Track and Field Championships winners (men)
- List of USA Outdoor Track and Field Championships winners (women)
