= Athletics at the 1951 Pan American Games – Women's 80 metres hurdles =

Women's 80 metres hurdles at the Pan American Games

The women's 80 metres hurdles event at the 1951 Pan American Games was held at the Estadio Monumental in Buenos Aires on 2 and 3 March.

== Medalists ==
Gold	Silver	Bronze
Eliana Gaete; Chile	Marion Huber; Chile	Nancy Phillips; United States

== Results ==
=== Heats ===
Rank	Heat	Name	Nationality	Time	Notes
1	1	Eliana Gaete	Chile	11.6	Q
2	1	Wanda dos Santos	Brazil	12.3	Q
3	1	Janet Moreau	United States	12.7	
4	1	Alba Damiani	Argentina	12.7	
1	2	Nancy Phillips	United States	12.0	Q
2	2	Elisa Kaczmarek	Argentina	12.2	Q
3	2	Aida Mawyn	Ecuador	13.4	
1	3	Marion Huber	Chile	12.0	Q
2	3	Evelyn Lawler	United States	12.2	Q
3	3	Luisa Pfarr	Argentina	12.6	
4	3	Elia Galván	Mexico	13.7	

=== Final ===
Rank	Name	Nationality	Time	Notes
1st place, gold medalist(s)	Eliana Gaete	Chile	11.9	
2nd place, silver medalist(s)	Marion Huber	Chile	12.0	
3rd place, bronze medalist(s)	Nancy Phillips	United States	12.1	
4	Wanda dos Santos	Brazil	12.2	
5	Elisa Kaczmarek	Argentina	12.4	
6	Evelyn Lawler	United States	12.6	
