= Donnis Thompson =

American athletics administrator

- Born: April 1, 1933; Chicago, Illinois
- Died: February 2, 2009 (aged 75)
- Education: B.A., 1955, George Williams College; University of Northern Colorado
- Awards: NACWAA Lifetime Achievement Award; YWCA Leadership Award; Girl Scout Council of Hawai'i Women of Distinction

Donnis Hazel Thompson (April 1, 1933 – February 2, 2009) was an American professor of health, physical education, and recreation at the University of Hawaii at Manoa, and was the university's first women's athletic director. At the University of Hawaii, she started the Rainbow Wahine program. In 1981, Thompson was elected the State of Hawaii Department of Education school superintendent.

== Early life ==
Thompson was born on April 1, 1933, in Chicago, Illinois. She attended Carter Elementary School and St. Elizabeth High School where she participated in swimming, track and field, and cheerleading. After high school, Thompson enrolled at George Williams College from which she graduated in 1955.

Thompson was an accomplished shot put thrower, finishing 3rd at the 1953 USA Outdoor Track and Field Championships in that event.

== Career ==
In 1961, Thompson started the Rainbow Wahine sports program by forming a track and field team. However, she struggled with the unequal treatment female athletes were subjected to prior to the passing of Title IX. In the team's inaugural season, Thompson's teaching salary equalled $5,000, with an added $700 for coaching. In 1962, Thompson was elected as coach to United States National Track Team, which competed against Russia.

As a professor of health, physical education, and recreation, she taught a course entitled "Physical Fitness for Women", where she introduced weight training, using bottles of bleach instead of weights to keep it non-threatening. However, when Thompson left the University of Hawaii to pursue her PhD at Northern Colorado University, the track team was unable to be supported and eventually disbanded.

Upon returning to the University of Hawaii, Thompson worked alongside Congresswoman Patsy Mink to write the legislation for Title IX to end discrimination on the basis of gender. Soon after the passing of Title IX in 1972, she was appointed the university's first women's athletic director, on a budget of $5,000. A few years later, in 1975, Thompson requested a budget increase to $231,000, but received only $131,000. With this amount, she hired Dave Shoji in 1975 to become a part-time women's volleyball coach on a salary of $2,000 per season. The following year, Thompson began charging for admission to women's volleyball events, which was a revolutionary idea for the time.

On April 5, 1981, the State of Hawaii dedicated that day as "Dr. Donnis Thompson Day" to honor the impact of her contributions to women’s athletics. As a result of her success, Thompson was named the State of Hawaii Department of Education school superintendent, before being terminated in 1984 for a lack of long range planning and policy. Prior to leaving the University of Hawaii, Thompson helped add five more women's sports and achieve a National Volleyball Championship title. She returned to teach at the University of Hawaii after her termination from 1984 until 1991.

On October 28, 2007, artist Jan-Michelle Sawyer unveiled a statue honoring Thompson in the Stan Sheriff Center. The next year, she was honored with a NACWAA Lifetime Achievement Award. Thompson died on February 2, 2009, at the age of 75.
