= Bill Tidwell =

American university sports administrator

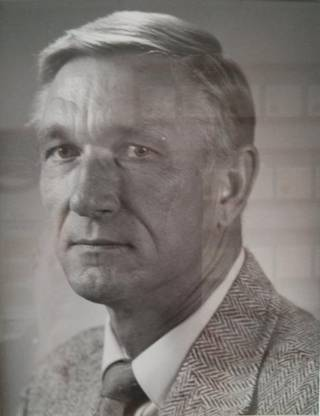

Biographical details
- Born: April 8, 1932; Kiowa, Kansas, U.S.
- Died: March 16, 2023 (aged 90); Emporia, Kansas, U.S.
- Education: Kansas State Teachers College; Columbia University

Playing career
- 1953–1957: Kansas State Teachers College

Coaching career (HC unless noted)
- 1959–71: Oberlin (OH)
- 1979–1984: Emporia State

Administrative career (AD unless noted)
- 1959–1971: Oberlin
- 1971–1979: Emporia State

Accomplishments and honors

Awards
- NAIA Hall of Fame (1963); Drake Relays Hall of Fame (1977); Emporia State Athletics Hall of Honor (1982); Kansas Sports Hall of Fame (2014)

Billy Dale Tidwell (April 8, 1932 – March 16, 2023) was an American university sports administrator and former college track and field and cross country coach. Tidwell served as Emporia State University's athletic director from 1971 to 1979, and coached track and field, as well as cross country from 1979 until 1984 after his retirement as athletics director.

== Early years ==
Tidwell was born in Kiowa, Kansas and attended Kiowa High School. After high school, Tidwell attended the Kansas State Teachers College (KSTC) to compete in cross country and track & field. He was a four-time national NAIA champion and finished 3rd in the 880 yards at the 1955 USA Outdoor Track and Field Championships. Tidwell graduated with a bachelor's of science education in health in 1957, followed by a master's degree in 1958. Tidwell received his doctorate from Columbia University.

== Career ==
After graduating from KSTC in 1958, Tidwell became an assistant professor at Hunter College for one year before leaving for Oberlin College. While at Oberlin, Tidwell was the athletic director, cross country and track & field coach, and a professor in the health and education department. While at Oberlin, Tidwell became the first chairman of both the men's and women's sports. In 1971, Tidwell became the athletics director at his alma mater.

While at Emporia State from 1971 to 1979, Tidwell served as a professor, chair of the HPER department, and the athletics director. In 1979, Tidwell resigned as the athletics director, while continuing to teach and became the cross country and track & field coach for five years. Tidwell retired in 1994.

=== Awards and honors ===
In 1963, Tidwell became a member of the National Association of Intercollegiate Athletics Hall of Fame. In 1977, Tidwell entered the Drake Relays Hall of Fame. In 1982, Tidwell became a charter member at his alma mater's hall of fame and in 2014, was inducted into the Kansas Sports Hall of Fame. Oberlin College Athletics awards the "Billy Tidwell" to student athletes who show athleticism, professionalism, teaching, and community service.
