= Marion Huber =

Chilean sprinter (born 1930)

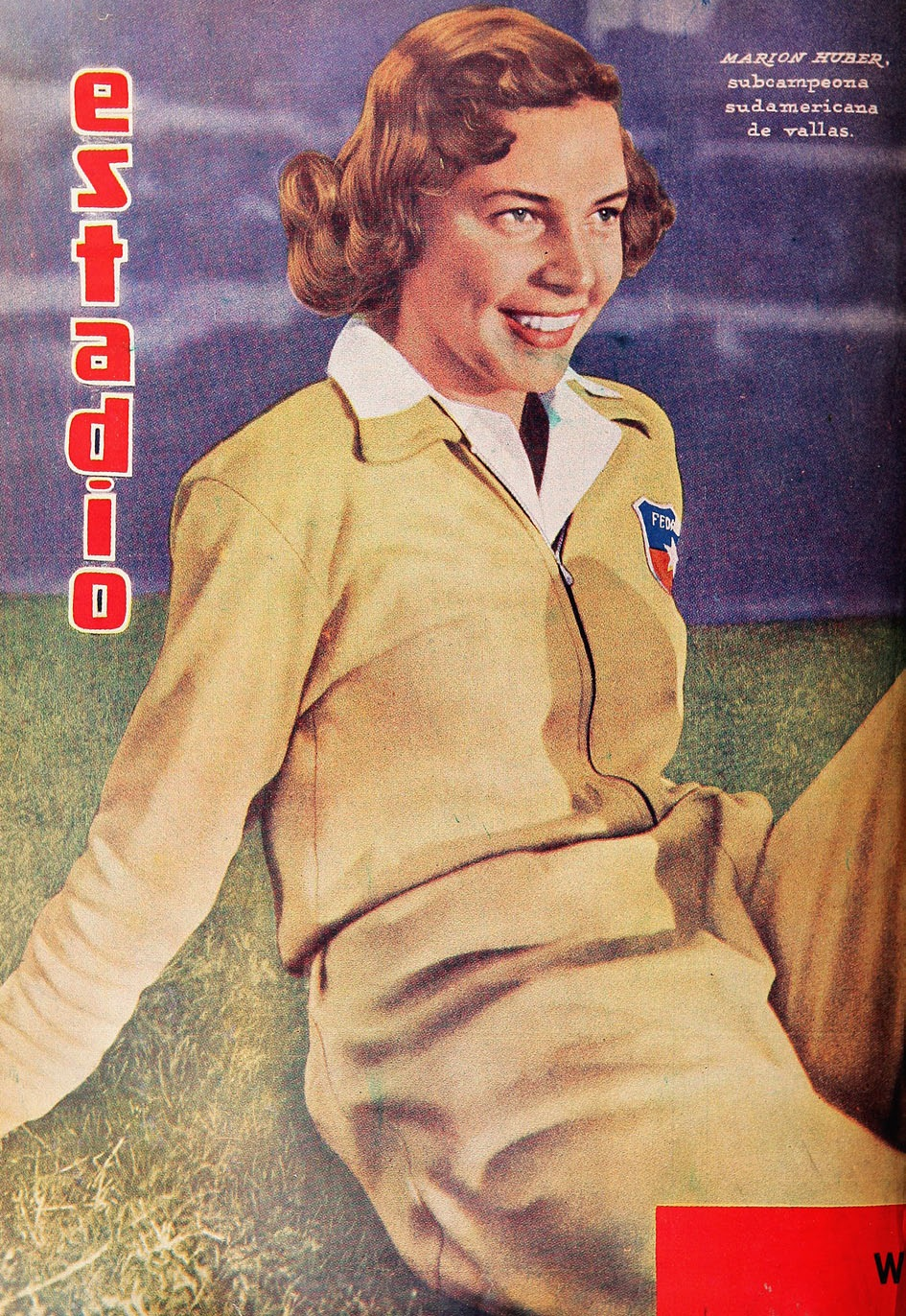

Personal information
- Full name: Marion Anita Huber von Appen
- Nationality: Chilean
- Born: 26 September 1930 (age 96) Valparaíso, Chile

Sport
- Sport: Track and field athletics
- Event: 80 metres hurdles

Marion Anita Huber von Appen (born 26 September 1930) is a former Chilean hurdler. She competed in the women's 80 metres hurdles and 4 × 100 metres relay at the 1948 Summer Olympics.

== International competitions ==
Year	Competition	Venue	Position	Event	Notes
Representing Chile
1948	Olympic Games	London, United Kingdom	5th (h)	80 m hurdles	NT
1948	Olympic Games	London, United Kingdom	10th (h)	4 × 100 m relay	51.68
1949	South American Championships	Lima, Peru	2nd	80 m hurdles	12.2
1951	Pan American Games	Buenos Aires, Argentina	2nd	80 m hurdles	12.0
1952	South American Championships	Buenos Aires, Argentina	2nd	80 m hurdles	11.7
1952	Olympic Games	Helsinki, Finland	– (h)	80 m hurdles	DNF

== Personal bests ==
- 80 metres hurdles – 11.7h (1951)
