= Nick Costes =

American long-distance runner

Personal information
- Nationality: American
- Born: August 3, 1926 Farrell, Pennsylvania, United States
- Died: March 24, 2003 (aged 76) Lexington, Kentucky, United States

Sport
- Sport: Long-distance running
- Event: Marathon

Nick Costes (August 3, 1926 – March 24, 2003) was an American long-distance runner. He competed in the marathon at the 1956 Summer Olympics.
