= Paula Deubel =

American shot putter

Personal information
- Nationality: American
- Born: June 24, 1935
- Died: August 21, 1993 (aged 58)

Sport
- Sport: Athletics
- Event: Shot put

Paula Deubel (June 24, 1935 – August 21, 1993) was an American athlete. She competed in the women's shot put at the 1956 Summer Olympics.
