= Dick Hart (athlete) =

American long-distance runner

Personal information
- Full name: Richard Lewis Hart
- Nationality: American
- Born: March 19, 1927
- Died: February 18, 1991 (aged 63)

Sport
- Sport: Long-distance running
- Event: 10,000 metres

Richard Lewis Hart (March 19, 1927 – February 18, 1991) was an American long-distance runner. He competed in the men's 10,000 metres at the 1956 Summer Olympics.

Dick Hart ran distances for the Penn Quakers, finishing in 5th at the NCAA championships in 1950, the year he graduated with a degree in mechanical engineering. Later he became the AAU 5K champion in 1956 and won the 6-mile run in 1955.
