= Verneda Thomas =

American volleyball player (1936–2016)

Verneda Estella Thomas (June 21, 1936 – March 30, 2016) was an American volleyball player. She played for the United States national team at the 1964 Summer Olympics. Before she was an Olympic volleyball player, she was also an elite high jumper, winning a bronze medal at the 1955 Pan American Games in that event.

Thomas died on March 30, 2016, at the age of 79.
