= Marty Engel =

American hammer thrower (1932–2022)

Personal information
- Nationality: American
- Born: January 25, 1932 New York City, U.S.
- Died: January 29, 2022 (aged 90)

Sport
- Sport: Athletics
- Event: Hammer throw

Marty Engel (January 25, 1932 – January 29, 2022) was an American athlete. He competed in the men's hammer throw at the 1952 Summer Olympics.

Engel competed for the NYU Violets track and field team in the NCAA.

He competed for Team USA in the hammer throw in the 1953 Maccabiah Games, winning a gold medal in the hammer throw and a bronze medal in the shot put. He also competed for the U.S. in the 1957 Maccabiah Games, and won a gold medal in the hammer throw, a gold medal in the shot put, and a bronze medal in discus.

Engel served in the United States Army. He died on January 29, 2022, at the age of 90.
