= Kent Floerke =

American triple jumper

Personal information
- Nationality: American
- Born: January 16, 1936
- Died: May 24, 2022 (aged 86)

Sport
- Sport: Athletics
- Event: Triple jump

Kent Floerke (January 16, 1936 – May 24, 2022) was an American athlete. He competed in the men's triple jump at the 1964 Summer Olympics.

Floerke attended Rosedale High School in Kansas City where he played American football and ran track. He was an All-American jumper for the Kansas Jayhawks track and field team, placing runner-up in the triple jump and 3rd in the long jump at the 1956 NCAA track and field championships. He was considered America's top triple jumper in 1958. In 1962, he founded the Kansas City Olympic Track Club. The following year, he was appointed secretary of a Jackson County, Missouri branch of the YMCA.
