= George Shaw (triple jumper) =

American triple jumper

Personal information
- Nationality: American
- Born: August 31, 1931
- Died: December 6, 1988 (aged 57)

Sport
- Sport: Athletics
- Event: Triple jump

George Shaw (August 12, 1931 – December 6, 1988) was an American athlete. He competed in the men's triple jump at the 1952 Summer Olympics and the 1956 Summer Olympics.

Competing for the Columbia Lions track and field team, Shaw won the 1952 NCAA Track and Field Championships in the triple jump.
