= Barbara Mueller (athlete) =

American hurdler, pentathlete and high jumper

Barbara Ann Mueller (born May 23, 1933, in Chicago, Illinois) is a retired American track and field athlete. She represented the United States at the 1956 Olympics, running the 80 meters hurdles. Her 11.6 did not get her out of the heats. A versatile athlete, she won the pentathlon at the US National Championships in 1955 and 1956, both times defeating Stella Walsh. While finishing second to Cuban Bertha Diaz, she was National Champion in the hurdles in 1955 as the first American in the race. She won the 1954 National Indoor Championship in the 50 yard hurdles. She also ran hurdles in the 1955 and 1959 Pan American Games.
