= Janet Dicks =

American athlete (born 1933)

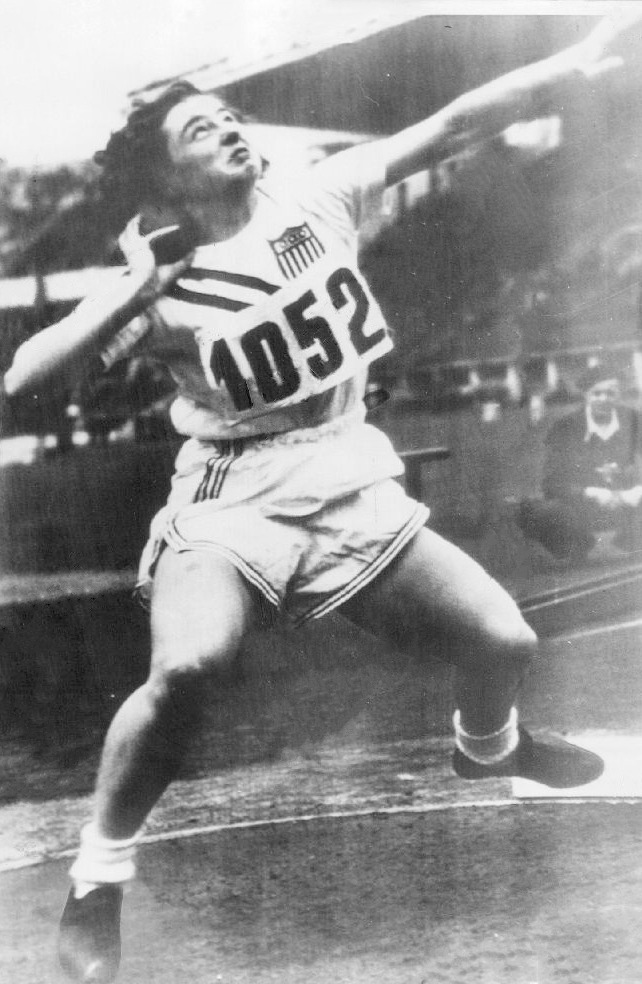
- Janet Dicks in 1952

Personal information
- Born: February 6, 1933 (age 93) Harrisburg, Pennsylvania, U.S.
- Education: East Stroudsburg State College
- Height: 168 cm (5 ft 6 in)
- Weight: 65 kg (143 lb)

Sport
- Sport: Athletics
- Event(s): Shot put, discus throw, javelin throw
- Club: Harrisburg AAU

Achievements and titles
- Personal best(s): SP – 12.09 m (1952); DT – 37.54 m (1953); JT – 35.98 (1953)

Janet Marie Dicks (born February 6, 1933) is a retired American weight thrower. In 1952 she won both the national titles and U.S. Olympic trials in the shot put and discus throw. At the 1952 Summer Olympics, she competed only in the shot put and placed 18th. The following year, she won her third and last national title in the discus. Between 1951 and 1957 she had 10 finishes within the first four places at the national championships in the shot put, discus throw and javelin throw.
