= Arnie Sowell =

American middle-distance runner

Personal information
- Full name: Arnold Milton Sowell
- Born: April 6, 1935 (age 91) Pittsburgh, Pennsylvania, U.S.
- Height: 1.80 m (5 ft 11 in)
- Weight: 130 lb (59 kg)

Sport
- College team: Pittsburgh
Medal record
Men's Athletics
Representing the United States
Pan American Games
Gold medal – first place	1955 Mexico City	800 metres

Arnold Milton Sowell (born April 6, 1935) is a former middle distance runner from the United States, who represented his native country at the 1956 Summer Olympics in Melbourne, Australia. He finished fourth in the Men's 800-meter race.

== Life ==
The son of a Pittsburgh city council maintenance man, Sowell was a 1953 graduate of Schenley High School. As a student at the University of Pittsburgh, he became a prize-winning athlete while a member of the Pitt Panthers track and field team, taking the NCAA's 880-yard titles in 1954 and 1956. In 1956, he also won the annual Charles C. Hartwig award.

After leaving college with a business degree in 1957, he married fellow Pitt graduate, Barbara Peace, who had earned her degree in arts and sciences.

He then embarked on a career in the military. Sowell's admittance in 1957 to the Fort Benning United States Army Training School as a second lieutenant was viewed as newsworthy at the time. He continued his running career into 1959 as a representative of the army, and competed on the pentathlon team. In 1980, he retired at the rank of lieutenant colonel.

After the military, Sowell worked as a procurement director for the Charlotte (North Carolina) Housing Authority.

=== Legacy ===
Sowell has never been forgotten as a famous alumnus of Pitt and as a distinguished member of the African-American community. He has received accolades from the African American Alumni Council (AAAC) and the 1996 Award of Distinction by the Varsity Letter Club. In 2007, Sowell was one of the guests of honor at a celebration of fellow Olympian and Pitt alumnus Herb Douglas on his 85th birthday at a celebration at the Senator John Heinz History Center in Pittsburgh.

== Athletic achievements ==
Sowell is best known for winning the gold medal in the men's 800-meter event during the 1955 Pan American Games in Mexico City. Sowell also set the world indoor record for the 880-yard run in 1957 at 1:50.3 and tied the world record for the 1,000 yards of 2:08.2 in 1955.

He was recognized as a versatile runner who could run long distances, as well as hurdle and long jump.

One track coach, Manhattan's George Eastment, described him as the "greatest runner I ever saw"; another, Carl Olson, felt he could break the four-minute mile.

During his career, he had a particular rivalry with his fellow countryman and middle-distance runner, Tom Courtney, the two swapping victories and being involved in many memorable duels. One duel was the 1956 Olympic trials where Courtney held off Sowell to finish first and second with Courtney in the process breaking Sowell's USA record (of 1:46.7) that he had achieved at that year's NCAA meet.

During the Olympic final itself, Sowell led from the back straight of the first lap right up to the final turn of the final lap where he was passed by Courtney. As they entered the final straight, Coutney now ahead had his own battle with Derek Johnson who had also passed Sowell, but Sowell had to contend with the challenge of Audun Boysen. Courtney won his battle with Johnson and finished first, but Sowell lost his and finished fourth.

Sowell was an excellent runner, indoors as well as outdoors, winning four NCAA titles and establishing a world record 1:50.3 for 880 yards.

In 1956, Sowell was a member of teams that set world records in the 4 x 440y and 4 x 880y relays.

== Rankings ==
Sowell was ranked among the best in the United States and the world at 800 metres/880 yards from 1954 to 1957, according to the votes of the experts of Track and Field News.

800 meters
Year	World rank	US rank
1954	9th	3rd
1955	3rd	1st
1956	5th	2nd
1957	6th	3rd

== USA Championships ==
Sowell was a very successful competitor at 800 metres/880 yards at the USA National Track and Field Championships between 1955 and 1958.:

USA Championships
Year	800m/880y
1955 - 880y	1st
1956 - 800m	1st
1957 - 880y	2nd
1958 - 880y	5th
