= Lois Testa =

American former athlete and teacher (born 1935)

Lois Ann Testa Lynch
- Born: Lois Ann Testa; December 16, 1935 (age 90); Pawtucket, Rhode Island, United States
- Education: Rhode Island College (BEd, 1957)
- Height: 5 ft 4.5 in (163.8 cm)

Lois Ann Testa Lynch (born December 16, 1935) is an American former athlete and teacher. She represented the United States in the shot put at the 1956 Summer Olympics.

== Biography ==
Lois Ann Testa was born in Pawtucket, Rhode Island. She attended Pawtucket East High School, where she competed in swimming, basketball, and badminton. She attended Rhode Island College.

At the suggestion of Olympian Janet Moreau, Testa began training in track and field at Providence College, and joined the Red Diamond Athletic Club. She won an Amateur Athletic Union (AAU) title in the 1954 outdoor shot put, where she set an AAU record of 42 feet 7 inches. She also won the 1955–1956 AAU title for indoor shot put.

In the 1956 United States Olympic Trials, Testa finished second in the shot put, achieving her personal best distance of 45 feet 6 3/4 inches. She also finished fourth in the discus throw, with a distance of 129 feet 3 inches.

Competing in the shot put at the 1956 Summer Olympics in Melbourne, Testa qualified for the finals and finished 14th.

Lois Testa graduated from Rhode Island College in 1957 with a bachelor's degree in elementary education. She worked as a teacher in Massachusetts, Connecticut, and Florida.

She was inducted into the Rhode Island Heritage Hall of Fame in 1968. In 2000, she was inducted into the Rhode Island College Athletic Hall of Fame.
