= Parry O'Brien =

American shot putter

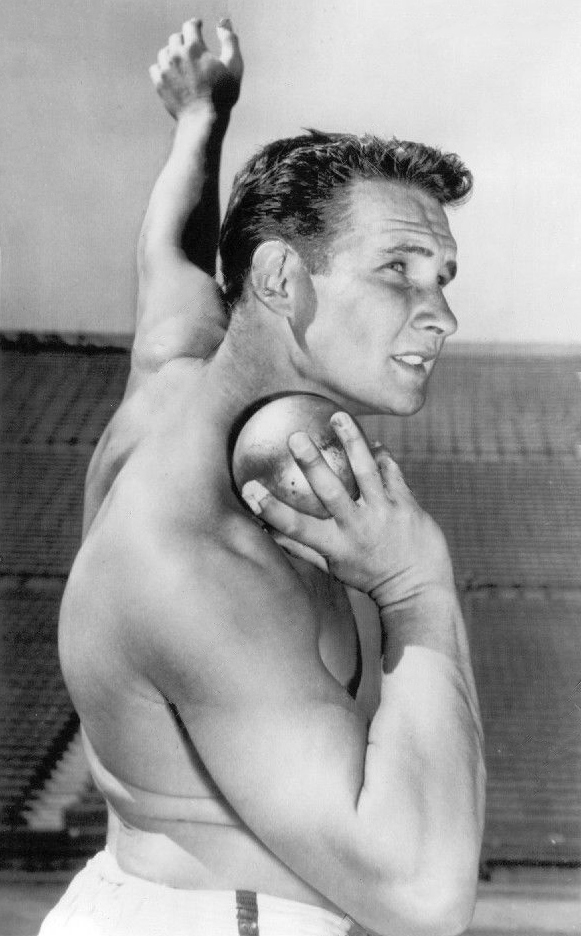
- O'Brien in 1954

Personal information
- Full name: William Parry O'Brien
- Born: William Patrick O'Brien; January 28, 1932 Santa Monica, California, U.S.
- Died: April 21, 2007 (aged 75) Santa Clarita, California, U.S.
- Height: 6 ft 2 1/2 in (189 cm)
- Weight: 245 lb (111 kg)

Sport
- Country: USA
- Sport: Athletics, Shot put
- Events: Shot put, discus throw

Achievements and titles
- Personal bests: SP – 19.69 m (1966); DT – 59.99 m (1965)
Medal record
Men's athletics
Representing the United States
Olympic Games
Gold medal – first place	1952 Helsinki	Shot put
Gold medal – first place	1956 Melbourne	Shot put
Silver medal – second place	1960 Rome	Shot put
Pan American Games
Gold medal – first place	1955 Mexico City	Shot put
Gold medal – first place	1959 Chicago	Shot put
- Updated on May 25, 2015

William Patrick "Parry" O'Brien (January 28, 1932 – April 21, 2007) was an American shot put champion. He competed in four consecutive Summer Olympics where he won two gold medals (1952, 1956) and one silver medal (1960). In his last Olympic competition (1964) he placed fourth. For all of these accomplishments, O'Brien was inducted into the IAAF and U.S. Olympic halls of fame.

== Personal life and education ==
Born in Santa Monica, California, Parry was very active in sports at Santa Monica High School, playing end on the football team that won the California state championship in 1948. He was then awarded an athletic scholarship in football to the University of Southern California. He won the (non-standard for high schoolers) 16-pound shot put competition at the 1949 CIF California State Meet. He also finished in third place that year putting the standard 12-pound shot for high schoolers.

O'Brien enrolled in college at U.S.C., where he continued to play football as a freshman until he was kicked in the stomach during practice and injured. He then decided to concentrate on track and field, for the shot put and the discus throw.

In the early 1950s, O'Brien developed a new method for putting the 16-pound shot. The Los Angeles Times described it:

When O'Brien began throwing the shot, the standard method was to rock back on one leg, swing the other in front for balance, hop forward and propel the iron ball forward. O'Brien instead began by facing the back of the circle. He then turned 180 degrees, using the spin to generate momentum and help him throw the shot greater distances.

Using this method he was able to break the world record in the shot put 17 times, becoming the first man to put the 16-pound shot more than 60 feet, and winning 116 consecutive meets in the shot put. This method became known as "O'Brien Style" or the "O'Brien Glide". He held the world record from 1953 to 1959. During his career he won 18 Amateur Athletic Union championships (combined outdoor and indoor), 17 in the shot put, plus one in the discus. He won nine consecutive national indoor shot put championships, and he won eight overall outdoors, including five in a row.

As a competitor, in addition to developing new techniques for the shot put, he also made motivational tapes for himself, and experimented with yoga. Time magazine, in a cover story written during the week before the 1956 Summer Olympics, noted "None has been more successful than O'Brien in combining what he calls 'M.A.' (mental attitude) and 'P.A.' (physical aptitude)." He won consecutive gold medals in the 1952 and 1956 Olympics, becoming the first man to retain his Olympic shot put title since Ralph Rose of the United States won the gold medal in 1904 and 1908. During the 1960 Summer Olympics, O'Brien won the silver medal in one of the rare track meets that he did not win.

In 1964, O'Brien was the flag bearer for the American Olympic Team at the Tokyo Olympic Games.

O'Brien entered the National Track and Field Hall of Fame of the United States in 1974. He was chosen for the U.S. Olympic Hall of Fame in 1984, and then the University of Southern California Athletic Hall of Fame in 1994.

After retiring from senior competitions, O'Brien worked in the banking and real estate business in Southern California. He remained active in masters athletics, and he put a six-kilogram shot 58 ft 1 1/2 in (17.717 m) at age 50 in 1984. This distance, two feet further than the listed American Masters record in his age division, is still pending. Later in the 1990s he began swimming because athletics put too much stress on his joints.

== Death ==
O'Brien died at 75, of a heart attack in the 500-yard freestyle swimming pool at the Santa Clarita Aquatics club while he was competing in a Southern Pacific Masters Association regional swimming competition. He was survived by his wife Terri, stepsons Erik Skorge and Norman Skorge, and daughters Shauna and Erin. O'Brien was previously married to Sandra Cordrey (March 1955) and Arden Arena (June 1960).

Olympic Games
Preceded by Bill Disney	Flagbearer for United States; Tokyo 1964	Succeeded by Terry McDermott
