= Bob Richards =

American athlete (1926–2023)

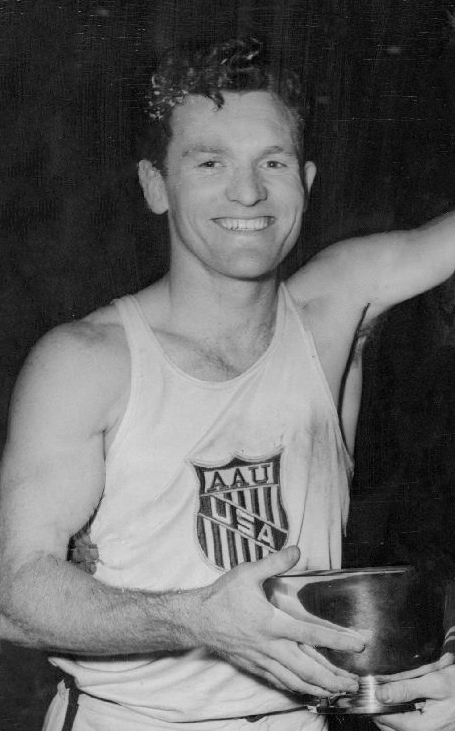
- Richards in 1951

Personal details
- Born: Robert Eugene Richards; February 20, 1926 Champaign, Illinois, U.S.
- Died: February 26, 2023 (aged 97)
- Party: Populist (1984–1996); American Freedom (2010–2023)
- Education: University of Illinois at Urbana–Champaign
- Sports career
- Height: 1.78 m (5 ft 10 in)
- Weight: 75 kg (165 lb)
- Sport: Pole vault, decathlon
- Club: LAAC, Los Angeles

Sports achievements and titles
- Personal bests: HJ – 1.91 m (1954); PV – 4.72 m (1957); LJ – 7.09 m (1954)
Medal record
Men's athletics
Representing the United States
Olympic Games
Gold medal – first place	1956 Melbourne	Pole vault
Gold medal – first place	1952 Helsinki	Pole vault
Bronze medal – third place	1948 London	Pole vault
Pan American Games
Gold medal – first place	1951 Buenos Aires	Pole vault
Gold medal – first place	1955 Mexico City	Pole vault
Silver medal – second place	1955 Mexico City	Decathlon

Robert Eugene Richards (February 20, 1926 – February 26, 2023) was an American athlete, minister, and politician. He made three U.S. Olympic Teams in two events: the 1948, 1952, and 1956 Summer Olympics as a pole vaulter and as a decathlete in 1956. He won gold medals in pole vault in both 1952 and 1956, becoming the first male two-time champion in the event in Olympic history (a feat only equalled in 2024 by Armand Duplantis).

While still an active athlete, Richards became an ordained minister. He ran for President of the United States in 1984 on the Populist Party ticket.

== Athletic career ==
Richards was the second man to pole vault 15 ft (4.57 m). While a student at the University of Illinois, Richards tied for the national collegiate pole vault title and followed that with 20 national Amateur Athletic Union (AAU) titles, including 17 in the pole vault and three in the decathlon. The first man to clear 15 feet was Dutch Warmerdam, who set the world record of 4.77 m (15 ft 7 3/4 in) in 1942, long before Richards came into his prime. While Richards was the dominant vaulter of his time, he never set a world record.

Richards later became involved in promoting physical fitness and continued to vault in his later years. He was the first athlete to appear on the front of Wheaties cereal boxes in 1958 (though not the first depicted on all parts of the packaging), and also was the first Wheaties spokesman, setting up the Wheaties Sports Federation, which encouraged participation in Olympic sports. Richards had four sons who were also pole vaulters: Brandon, held the national high school record at 18'2" for fourteen years from 1985; Tom won the CIF California State Meet in 1988; and Bob Jr. was second in the same meet in 1968 and later in 1973 ranked #7 in the United States.

Richards was the only male two-time Olympic gold medal winner in the pole vault (1952 and 1956), until Armando Duplantis of Sweden matched that same feat (2021 and 2024). He also won a bronze medal in the pole vault at the 1948 summer games. Russian Yelena Isinbayeva is the only other pole vaulter besides Richards to have won three Olympic medals in the pole vault, which she completed in 2012. Richards placed 13th in the decathlon at the 1956 Olympics.

Richards was elected to the U.S. Olympic Hall of Fame in 1983 and the United States National Track and Field Hall of Fame in 1975. As he aged, Richards continued participating in track and field in a variety of events, particularly throwing events. He was one of the first regular participants in the origins of what now has become Masters athletics. Richards appeared on the panel game show What's My Line? episode #346 January 20, 1957.

== Ministry ==
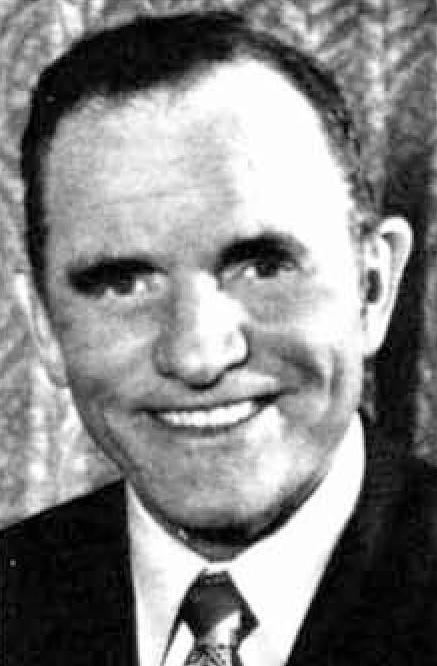
Richards while running for president

Richards was ordained in 1946 as a minister in the Church of the Brethren (which led to his being nicknamed the "Vaulting Vicar" or the "Pole Vaulting Parson"). As future tennis player Billie Jean King's church minister, Richards inspired King. One day, when King was 13 or 14, Richards asked her, "What are you going to do with your life?" She said: "Reverend, I'm going to be the best tennis player in the world." In 1957 the actor Hal Stalmaster played Richards as a teenager in an episode of the ABC anthology series Cavalcade of America.

== Political career ==
In the 1984 United States presidential election, Richards ran for President of the United States on the far-right, white nationalist Populist Party ticket. He and running mate Maureen Salaman earned 66,324 votes.

== Personal life ==
Richards met his first wife, Mary Leah Cline, at Bethany Biblical Seminary in 1946. The couple had three children: Carol, Bobby, and Paul. Richards met his second wife, Vonda Joan "Joni" Beaird, a singer and actress who played Kookie's girlfriend on 77 Sunset Strip, when she auditioned for a role in a film Richards was producing. They wed in 1970, and had three children: Brandon, Tommy, and Tammy. Joni was a gourmet cook and co-business partner with Richards in all of his business interests; she preceded Richards, dying on September 20, 2019.

The family home was on Richards beloved Crossbar Ranch in Santo, Texas. In 2012, Richards and Joni retired to Waco, Texas, where as an enthusiastic golfer he owned Lake Waco Golf Club, and collected low volume classic cars.

== Death ==
Richards died on February 26, 2023, six days after his 97th birthday.

== Awards ==
Richards was inducted as a Laureate of The Lincoln Academy of Illinois and awarded the Order of Lincoln (the State's highest honor) by the Governor of Illinois in 2000 in the area of Sports. Richards is referenced in the ESPN 30 for 30 documentary "Survive and Advance", for the impact he had on former N.C. State coach Jim Valvano. Valvano cites hearing Richards speak when he was a teen and the motivational messages he implored. Richards was inducted into the National Fitness Hall of Fame in 2009 and was inducted into the Texas Track and Field Coaches Association Hall of Fame (Class of 2017).

== See also ==
- List of athletes on Wheaties boxes

Party political offices
New political party	Populist nominee for President of the United States; 1984	Succeeded by David Duke
