= Henry Laskau =

American racewalker (1916–2000)

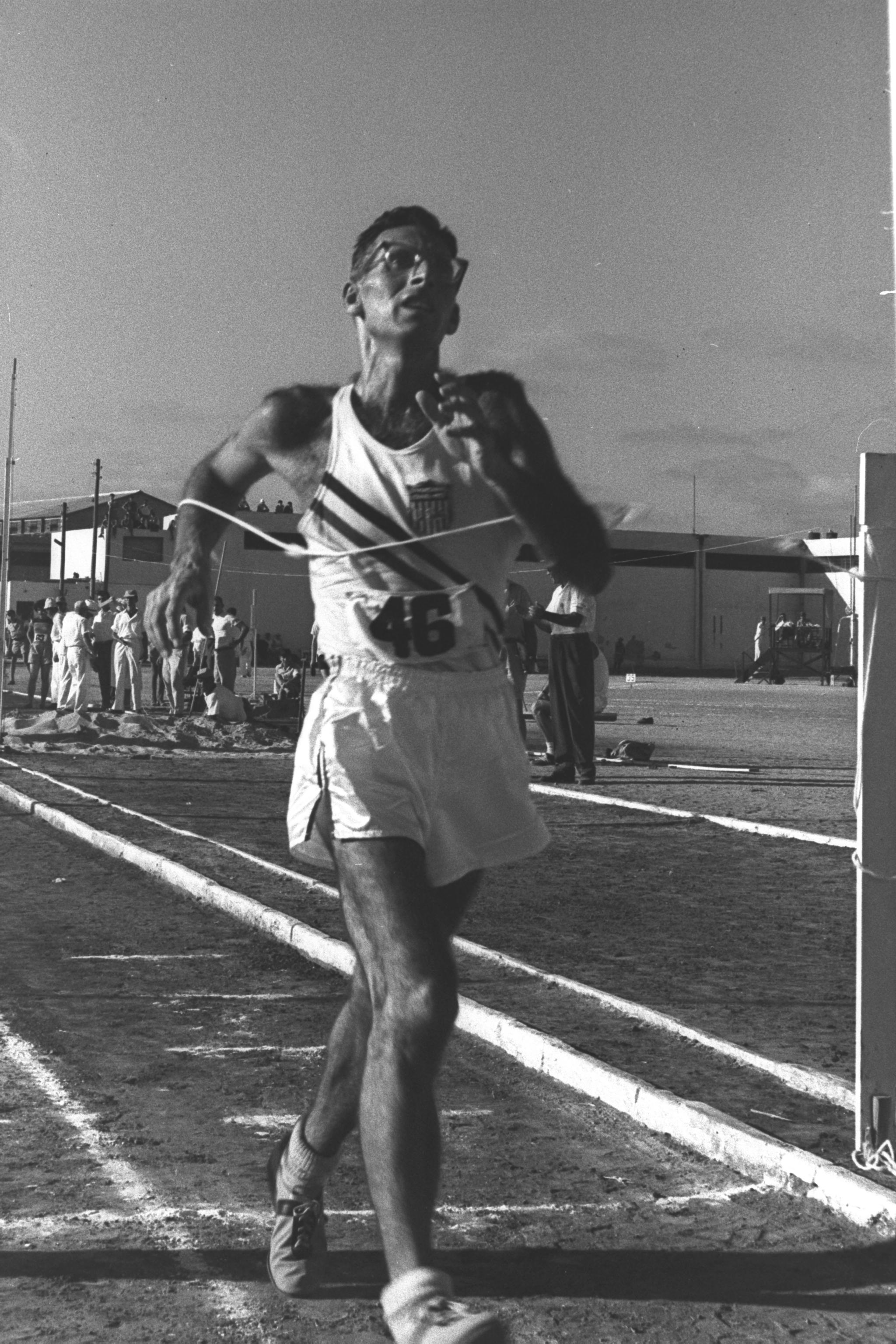

Personal information
- National team: United States
- Born: Helmut Laskau; September 12, 1916 Berlin, Germany
- Died: May 7, 2000 (aged 83) Coconut Creek, Florida, U.S.
Medal record
Men's athletics
Representing United States
Pan American Games
Gold medal – first place	1951 Buenos Aires	10 km Walk
Maccabiah Games
Gold medal – first place	1950 Israel	3000 m
Gold medal – first place	1953 Israel	3000 m
Gold medal – first place	1957 Israel	3000 m

Helmut ("Henry") Laskau (September 12, 1916 – May 7, 2000) has been called the greatest racewalker in U.S. track and field history. Born in Berlin, Germany Laskau was a top distance runner in his native Germany, before being forced to leave that country by the Nazis in 1938 due to his Jewish heritage. He moved to the United States and served in the U.S. Army during World War II, before resuming his competitive walking career in 1946.

Over two decades Laskau won 42 national titles, set the world record in the mile, was the national A.A.U champion, and was a competitor in the 1948, 1952, and 1956 Olympic Games, placing 12th in 1952 at 20 kilometers. He was a 1951 Pan-American Games champion.

He also was a four-time gold medal winner at the Maccabiah Games in the 3,000 m race walk; in the 1950 Maccabiah Games, 1953 Maccabiah Games, 1957 Maccabiah Games, and 1965 Maccabiah Games. During an 11-year career, he set five national records and during nine years of that period was unbeaten by any American walker. Laskau won the racewalk at the 1970 Masters National Outdoor Championship in San Diego. In 1983, he was named to the USA All-Time Track and Field team. He remained active in the sport after retiring from competition, serving as a volunteer official. Laskau died at the age of 83 in Coconut Creek, Florida, in 2000.

You can listen to him talk about his life from the United States Holocaust Memorial Archives.

== See also ==
- List of select Jewish track and field athletes
