= Softball throw =

Track and field event

The softball throw is a track and field event used as a substitute for more technical throwing events in competitions involving youth, Paralympic, Special Olympics and masters-level competitors.

The general rules for the softball throw parallel those of the javelin throw when conducted in a formal environment, but the implement being thrown is a standard softball, which resembles the size of a standard shot but is considerably lighter.

The event was one of the standardized test events as part of the President's Award on Physical Fitness. It is an official event for ages 9–12 in the Hershey Youth track and field program. Other meets include it as a beginners event. It is a youth event for the World Dwarf Games.

Certain divisions of the Special Olympics throw a softball, specified in the rules as having a 30 cm circumference.

While it is not in the official USA Outdoor Track and Field Championships program, it is often part of local senior competitions. Some competitions introduce a factor for accuracy.

== Modern variations ==
Some Special Olympics programs contest the tennis ball throw as an alternative to the softball throw.

== Historical variations ==
Although the softball is the most common implement still used in non-Olympic-style competitions, during the 20th century there were variations of the event that were contested at the highest levels of open women's track and field in the United States. They were typically only held in women's competitions.

=== Baseball throw ===
The baseball throw has been contested at the USA Outdoor Track and Field Championships from 1923 to 1957. The championship record is held by Babe Didrikson at 296 ft 0 in (90.22 m), set at the 1931 USA Outdoor Track and Field Championships.

=== Basketball throw ===
The basketball throw was considered an indoor track and field analogue to the softball and baseball throws. It was contested at the USA Indoor Track and Field Championships from 1927 to 1969. The championship record of 135 ft 2 in (41.19 m) was set by Earlene Brown at the 1958 USA Indoor Track and Field Championships.
