= List of USA Outdoor Track and Field Championships winners (women) =

The USA Outdoor Track and Field Championships is an annual outdoor competition in the sport of athletics organised by USA Track & Field, which serves as the national championship for the sport in the United States. The venue of the championships is decided on an annual basis and several events are hosted separately.

The AAU held a women's championship for the first time in 1923, which has since been held annually (bar 1934). The men's and women's championships have been held jointly since 1976. Following professionalisation of the sport, the running of the national championships was taken over by The Athletics Congress of the USA (TAC) from 1980. TAC rebranded as USA Track & Field (USATF) in 1993. The national championships served as the United States Olympic Trials (track and field) in 1920, 1928, 1932, and from 1992 onwards. Olympic Trials were held separately in other years, and winners at the trial event were not declared national champions.

The national championships for cross country and road running are held separately from the main track and field competition.

== Women ==
=== 50 metres ===
USA Championship winners in women's 50-meter dash
1923: Marion McCartie; 1924: Christine Pylick; 1925–28: Elta Cartwright; 1929: Betty Robinson; 1930: Mary Carew; 1931: Alice Monk; 1932: Dorothy Nussbaum; 1933: Louise Stokes; 1934: Not held; 1935: Louise Stokes; 1936: Ivy Wilson; 1937–38: Claire Isicson; 1939: Gertrude Johnson; 1940: Jean Lane; 1941: Lucy Newell; 1942: Jeanette Jones; 1943–47: Alice Coachman; 1948: Mabel Walker; 1949: Juanita Watson; 1950: Dolores Dwyer; 1951: Mary McNabb; 1952: Catherine Hardy Lavender; 1953–54: Mabel Landry; 1955–56: Isabelle Daniels; 1957–58: Barbara Jones; 1959: Isabelle Daniels
Notes	The event was over 50 yards from 1923–32 and also 1955, 1957 and 1958. The 1959 distance was 60 meters.

=== 100 metres ===
US National Championship winners in women's 100-meter dash
1923–1979 Amateur Athletic Union	1923–1924: Frances Ruppert; 1925: Helen Filkey; 1926: Rosa Grosse; 1927–1928^{OT}: Elta Cartwright; 1929: Betty Robinson; 1930: Stella Walsh; 1931: Eleanor Egg; 1932^{OT}: Wilhelmina von Bremen; 1933: Annette Rogers; 1934: not held; 1935–1936: Helen Stephens; 1937: Claire Isicson; 1938: Lula Hymes; 1939: Olive Hasenfus; 1940–1941: Jean Lane; 1942: Alice Coachman; 1943–1944: Stella Walsh; 1945–1946: Alice Coachman; 1947: Juanita Watson; 1948: Stella Walsh; 1949–1950: Jean Patton; 1951: Mary McNabb; 1952: Catherine Hardy; 1953–1954: Barbara Jones; 1955–1956: Mae Faggs; 1957: Barbara Jones; 1958: Margaret Matthews; 1959–1962: Wilma Rudolph; 1963: Edith McGuire; 1964–1966: Wyomia Tyus; 1967: Barbara Ferrell; 1968: Margaret Bailes; 1969: Barbara Ferrell; 1970: Chi Cheng (TWN) * Iris Davis; 1971: Iris Davis; 1972: Alice Annum (GHA) * (3) Iris Davis; 1973: Iris Davis; 1974: Renaye Bowen; 1975: Rosalyn Bryant; 1976: Chandra Cheeseborough; 1977: Evelyn Ashford; 1978: Leleith Hodges (JAM) * Brenda Morehead; 1979: Evelyn Ashford
1980–1992 The Athletics Congress	1980: Alice Brown; 1981–1983: Evelyn Ashford; 1984 Merlene Ottey (JAM) * Alice Brown; 1985: Merlene Ottey (JAM) * Pam Marshall; 1986: Pam Marshall; 1987: Diane Williams; 1988: Sheila Echols; 1989: Dawn Sowell; 1990: Michelle Finn; 1991: Carlette Guidry; 1992^{OT}: Gwen Torrence
1993–present USA Track & Field	1993–1994: Gail Devers; 1995–1996^{OT}: Gwen Torrence; 1997–1998: Marion Jones; 1999: Inger Miller; 2000^{OT}: Marion Jones; 2001–2002: Chryste Gaines; 2003: Torri Edwards; 2004^{OT}: LaTasha Colander; 2005: Me'Lisa Barber; 2006: Lauryn Williams; 2007: Torri Edwards; 2008^{OT}: Muna Lee; 2009: Carmelita Jeter; 2010: Allyson Felix; 2011–2012^{OT}: Carmelita Jeter; 2013: English Gardner; 2014: Tianna Bartoletta; 2015: Tori Bowie; 2016^{OT}: English Gardner; 2017: Tori Bowie; 2018: Aleia Hobbs; 2019: Teahna Daniels; 2021^{2020 OT}: Javianne Oliver; 2022: Melissa Jefferson; 2023: Sha'Carri Richardson; 2024^{OT}: Sha'Carri Richardson; 2025: Melissa Jefferson-Wooden
Notes	OT: 1928, 1932, and since 1992, championships incorporated the Olympic Trials, otherwise held as a discrete event.; 2020 OT: The 2020 Olympic Trials were delayed and held in 2021 due to the COVID-19 pandemic.; Distance: The event was over 100 yards until 1927; from 1929 to 1931, 1955, 1957 to 1958, 1961 to 1962, 1965 to 1966, 1969 to 1970 and 1973 to 1974.

=== 200 metres ===
US National Championship winners in women's 200-meter dash
1926–1979 Amateur Athletic Union	1926: Frances Keddie; 1927: Ellen Brough; 1928^{OT}: Florence Wright; 1929: Maybelle Gilliland; 1930–1931: Stella Walsh; 1932^{OT}–1933 Olive Hasenfus; 1934: not held; 1935: Helen Stephens; 1936: Beverly Hobbs; 1937: Gertrude Johnson; 1938: Fanny Vitale; 1939–1940: Stella Walsh; 1941: Jean Lane; 1942–1948: Stella Walsh; 1949–1950: Nell Jackson; 1951: Jean Patton; 1952: Catherine Hardy; 1953: Dolores Dwyer; 1954–1956: Mae Faggs; 1957: Isabelle Daniels; 1958: Lucinda Williams; 1959: Isabelle Daniels; 1960: Wilma Rudolph; 1961: Lacey O'Neal; 1962–1963: Vivian Brown; 1964–1965: Edith McGuire; 1966: Wyomia Tyus; 1967: Diana Wilson; 1968: Wyomia Tyus; 1969: Barbara Ferrell; 1970: Chi Cheng (TWN) * Williomae Fergerson; 1971: Raelene Boyle (AUS) * Kathie Lawson; 1972: Alice Annum (GHA) * (3) Pamela Greene; 1973: Mable Fergerson; 1974: Alice Annum (GHA) * Fran Sichting; 1975: Debra Armstrong; 1976: Brenda Morehead; 1977–1979: Evelyn Ashford
1980–1992 The Athletics Congress	1980: Karen Hawkins; 1981: Evelyn Ashford; 1982: Merlene Ottey (JAM) * Florence Griffith; 1983: Evelyn Ashford; 1984 Merlene Ottey (JAM) * (3) Pam Marshall; 1985 Merlene Ottey (JAM) * Pam Marshall; 1986–1987: Pam Marshall; 1988: Gwen Torrence; 1989: Dannette Young; 1990: Grace Jackson (JAM) * Dannette Young; 1991–1992^{OT}: Gwen Torrence
1993–present USA Track & Field	1993: Gwen Torrence; 1994: Carlette Guidry-White; 1995: Gwen Torrence; 1996^{OT}: Carlette Guidry-White; 1997: Inger Miller; 1998–2000^{OT}: Marion Jones; 2001: LaTasha Jenkins; 2002: Stephanie Durst; 2003: Torri Edwards; 2004^{OT}–2005: Allyson Felix; 2006: Rachelle Boone-Smith; 2007–2009^{OT}: Allyson Felix; 2010: Connie Moore; 2011: Shalonda Solomon; 2012^{OT}: Allyson Felix; 2013: Kimberlyn Duncan; 2014: Jeneba Tarmoh; 2015: Jenna Prandini; 2016^{OT}: Tori Bowie; 2017: Deajah Stevens; 2018: Jenna Prandini; 2019: Dezerea Bryant; 2021^{2020 OT}: Gabrielle Thomas; 2022: Abby Steiner; 2023-2024: Gabrielle Thomas; 2025: Melissa Jefferson-Wooden
Notes	OT: 1928, 1932, and since 1992, championships incorporated the Olympic Trials in Olympic years, otherwise held as a discrete event.; Distance:The event was over 220 yards until 1932, 1955, 1957-8, 1961-3, 1965-6, 1969-70 and 1973-4; 2020 OT: The 2020 Olympic Trials were delayed and held in 2021 due to the COVID-19 pandemic.

=== 400 metres ===
US National Championship winners in women's 400-meter dash
1958–1979 Amateur Athletic Union	1958: Chris McKenzie; 1959: Kim Polson; 1960: Irene Robertson; 1961: Jackie Peterson; 1962–3: Suzanne Knott; 1964: Janell Smith; 1965: Janell Smith; 1966–7: Charlette Cooke; 1968: Jarvis Scott; 1969: Kathy Hammond; 1970: Mavis Laing; 1971: Mable Fergerson; 1972: Kathy Hammond; 1973: Mable Fergerson; 1974–5: Debra Sapenter; 1976: Lorna Forde (BAR) * Sheila Ingram; 1977: Sharon Dabney; 1978: Lorna Forde (BAR) * Patricia Jackson; 1979: Patricia Jackson
1980–1992 The Athletics Congress	1980: Sherri Howard; 1981–3: Denean Howard; 1984: Valerie Brisco; 1985: Lillie Leatherwood; 1986: Diane Dixon; 1987–8: Lillie Leatherwood; 1989: Rochelle Stevens; 1990: Maicel Malone; 1991: Lillie Leatherwood; 1992: Rochelle Stevens
1993–present USA Track & Field	1993: Jearl Miles; 1994: Natasha Kaiser-Brown; 1995: Jearl Miles; 1996: Maicel Malone; 1997: Jearl Miles Clark; 1998: Kim Graham; 1999: Maicel Malone; 2000–1: LaTasha Colander-Richardson; 2002: Jearl Miles Clark; 2003: Sanya Richards; 2004: Monique Hennagan; 2005–6: Sanya Richards; 2007: DeeDee Trotter; 2008–9: Sanya Richards; 2010: Debbie Dunn; 2011: Allyson Felix; 2012: Sanya Richards-Ross; 2013: Natasha Hastings; 2014: Francena McCorory; 2015–6: Allyson Felix; 2017: Quanera Hayes; 2018–9: Shakima Wimbley; 2021^{2020 OT}: Quanera Hayes; 2022: Talitha Diggs; 2023: Sydney McLaughlin-Levrone; 2024: Kendall Ellis; 2025: Sydney McLaughlin-Levrone
Notes	OT: Since 1992, championships incorporated the Olympic Trials in Olympic years, otherwise held as a discrete event.; 2020 OT: The 2020 Olympic Trials were delayed and held in 2021 due to the COVID-19 pandemic.; Distance:The event was over 440 yards until 1932, 1955, 1957–8, 1961–3, 1965–6, 1969–70 and 1973–4

=== 800 metres ===
US National Championship winners in women's 800-meter dash
1927–1979 Amateur Athletic Union	1927: Marcelle Barkley; 1928: Rayma Wilson; 1958: Flo McArdle; 1959: Grace Butcher; 1960–1: Pat Connolly; 1962: Leah Bennett; 1963–4: Sandy Knott; 1965: Marie Mulder; 1966: Charlette Cooke; 1967: Madeline Manning; 1968: Doris Brown; 1969: Madeline Manning; 1970–1: Cheryl Toussaint; 1972: Carol Hudson; 1973: Wendy Knudson; 1974: Mary Decker; 1975–6: Madeline Manning; 1977: Sue Addison; 1978: Ruth Wysocki; 1979: Essie Kelley
1980–1992 The Athletics Congress	1980–1: Madeline Manning; 1982: Delisa Walton; 1983: Robin Campbell; 1984: Kim Gallagher; 1985–6: Claudette Groenendall; 1987: Essie Kelley; 1988–9: Joetta Clark; 1990: Meredith Rainey; 1991: Delisa Walton-Floyd; 1992: Joetta Clark
1993–present USA Track & Field	1993–4: Joetta Clark; 1995–6: Meredith Rainey; 1997: Kathi Rounds; 1998–9: Jearl Miles Clark; 2000: Hazel Clark; 2001: Regina Jacobs; 2002: Nicole Teter; 2003–4: Jearl Miles Clark; 2005–6: Hazel Clark; 2007: Alysia Johnson; 2008–9: Hazel Clark; 2010–3: Alysia Montaño; 2014: Ajeé Wilson; 2015: Alysia Montaño; 2016: Kate Grace; 2017-9: Ajeé Wilson; 2021^{2020 OT}: Athing Mu; 2022: Athing Mu; 2023-24: Nia Akins; 2025: Roisin Willis
Notes	OT: 1928, and since 1992, championships incorporated the Olympic Trials in Olympic years, otherwise held as a discrete event.; 2020 OT: The 2020 Olympic Trials were delayed and held in 2021 due to the COVID-19 pandemic.; Distance:The event was over 880 yards in 1958, 1961–3, 1965–6, 1969–70 and 1973–4

=== 1500 metres ===
US National Championship winners in women's 1500-meter run
1965–1979 Amateur Athletic Union	1965: Marie Mulder; 1966: Doris Brown; 1967: Natalie Rocha; 1968: Jane Hill; 1969: Doris Brown; 1970: Francie Larrieu; 1971: Kathy Gibbons; 1972–73: Francie Larrieu; 1974: Doris Brown; 1975: Julie Brown; 1976–77: Francie Larrieu; 1978: Jan Merrill; 1979: Francie Larrieu
1980–1992 The Athletics Congress	1980: Francie Larrieu; 1981: Jan Merrill; 1982–83: Mary Slaney; 1984: Kim Gallagher; 1985: Diana Richburg; 1986: Linda Sheskey; 1987: Regina Jacobs; 1988: Vicki Huber; 1989: Regina Jacobs; 1990–91: Suzy Favor Hamilton; 1992: Regina Jacobs
1993–present USA Track & Field	1993: Annette Peters; 1994–97: Regina Jacobs; 1998: Suzy Hamilton; 1999–2002: Regina Jacobs; 2003: Suzy Favor Hamilton; 2004: Carrie Tollefson; 2005–07: Treniere Clement; 2008–09: Shannon Rowbury; 2010: Anna Pierce; 2011–12: Morgan Uceny; 2013: Treniere Moser; 2014–17: Jennifer Simpson; 2018–19: Shelby Houlihan; 2021^{2020 OT}: Elle Purrier St. Pierre; 2023-25: Nikki Hiltz
Notes	OT: Since 1992, championships incorporated the Olympic Trials in Olympic years; the Trials were otherwise held as a discrete event.; 2020 OT: The 2020 Olympic Trials were delayed and held in 2021 due to the COVID-19 pandemic.; Distance:The event was over one mile in 1973–4

=== 3000 metres ===
US National Championship winners in women's 3000-meter run/two-mile run
- 1970: Beth Bonner
- 1971: Doris Brown Heritage
- 1972: Tena Anex
- 1973: Eileen Claugus
- 1974–75: Lynn Bjorklund
- 1976–78: Jan Merrill
- 1979: Francie Larrieu Smith
- 1980: Julie Brown
- 1981: Brenda Webb
- 1982: Francie Larrieu Smith
- 1983: Mary Decker
- 1984: Jan Merrill
- 1985: Cathy Branta
- 1986–87: Mary Knisely
- 1988: Lynn Jennings
- 1989: PattiSue Plumer
- 1990: Lynn Jennings
- 1991: Shelly Steely
- 1992: PattiSue Plumer
- 1993: Annette Peters
- 1994: Annette Peters

=== 5000 metres ===
US National Championship winners in women's 5000-meter run
1983–1992 The Athletics Congress	1983: Judi St. Hilaire; 1984: Katie Ishmael; 1985: Suzanne Girard; 1986: Betty Jo Geiger; 1987: Nan Doak-Davis; 1988: Brenda Webb; 1989: Mindy Rowand; 1990–1991: PattiSue Plumer; 1992: Chris Boyd
1993–present USA Track & Field	1993: Chris McNamara; 1994: Ceci St. Geme; 1995: Gina Procaccio; 1996: Lynn Jennings; 1997: Libbie Hickman; 1998–2000: Regina Jacobs; 2001–2003: Marla Runyan; 2004: Shayne Culpepper; 2005: Shalane Flanagan; 2006: Lauren Fleshman; 2007: Shalane Flanagan; 2008–2009: Kara Goucher; 2010: Lauren Fleshman; 2011: Molly Huddle; 2012: Julie Culley; 2013: Jennifer Simpson; 2014: Molly Huddle; 2015: Nicole Tully; 2016: Molly Huddle; 2017–2019: Shelby Houlihan; 2021^{2020 OT}-2023: Elise Cranny; 2024: Elle St. Pierre; 2025: Shelby Houlihan
Notes	OT: Since 1992, championships incorporated the Olympic Trials in Olympic years, otherwise held as a discrete event.; 2020 OT: The 2020 Olympic Trials were delayed and held in 2021 due to the COVID-19 pandemic.

=== 10,000 metres ===
US National Championship winners in women's 10,000-meter run
1977–1979 Amateur Athletic Union	1977: Peg Neppel; 1978: Ellison Goodall; 1979: Mary Shea
1980–1992 The Athletics Congress	1981: Joan Samuelson; 1982: Kim Schnurpfeil; 1983: Katie Ishmael; 1984: Bonnie Sons; 1985: Francie Larrieu Smith; 1986: Nan Doak-Davis; 1987: Lynn Jennings; 1988: Carol Urish-McLatchie; 1989: Nan Doak-Davis; 1990: Colette Murphy; 1991–1992: Lynn Jennings
1993–present USA Track & Field	1993: Lynn Jennings; 1994: Olga Appell; 1995: Lynn Jennings; 1996: Kate Fonshell; 1997–1998: Lynn Jennings; 1999: Libbie Hickman; 2000–2001: Deena Drossin; 2002: Jennifer Rhines; 2003–2004: Deena Kastor; 2005: Katie McGregor; 2006: Amy Rudolph; 2007: Deena Kastor; 2008: Shalane Flanagan; 2009–2010: Amy Yoder Begley; 2011: Shalane Flanagan; 2012: Amy Hastings; 2013: Shalane Flanagan; 2014: Kim Conley; 2015–2019: Molly Huddle; 2021^{2020 OT}: Emily Sisson; 2022: Karissa Schweizer; 2023: Elise Cranny; 2024: Weini Kelati; 2025: Emily Infeld
Notes	OT: Since 1992, championships incorporated the Olympic Trials in Olympic years, otherwise held as a discrete event.; 2020 OT: The 2020 Olympic Trials were delayed and held in 2021 due to the COVID-19 pandemic.

=== 5K run ===
USA Championship winners in the women's 5K run
- 1986: Marty Cooksey
- 1987–88: Not held
- 1989: Judi St. Hilaire
- 1990: Lynn Jennings
- 1991: Janis Klecker
- 1992: Shelly Steely
- 1993–96: Lynn Jennings
- 1997: Elva Dryer
- 1998: Lynn Jennings
- 1999: Cheri Kenah
- 2000: Libbie Hickman
- 2001: Collette Liss
- 2002–04: Marla Runyan
- 2005: Amy Rudolph
- 2006: Sara Hall
- 2007–08: Shalane Flanagan
- 2009: Amy Yoder Begley
- 2010: Molly Huddle
- 2011: Julie Culley
- 2012–15: Molly Huddle
- 2016: Aliphine Tuliamuk
- 2017: Molly Huddle
- 2018: Emily Sisson
- 2019: Shannon Rowbury
- 2020: Cancelled
- 2021-22: Weini Kelati
- 2023-24: Annie Rodenfels
- 2025: Josette Andrews

=== 8K run ===
USA Championship winners in the women's 8K run
- 1988: Brenda Webb
- 1989: Leann Warren
- 1990: Elaine Van Blunk
- 1991: Lynn Jennings
- 1992: Anne Marie Letko
- 1993: Jody Hawkins
- 1994: Not held
- 1995: Lynn Doering
- 1996–97: Not held
- 1998–99: Amy Rudolph
- 2000: Not held
- 2001: Colleen De Reuck
- 2002–04: Not held
- 2005: Deena Kastor

=== 10K run ===
USA Championship winners in the women's 10K run
- 1978: Mary Decker
- 1979: Karin Von Berg
- 1980: Dana Slater
- 1981: Laura Craven
- 1982: Kathy Boyle
- 1983: Judi St. Hilaire
- 1984: Betty Jo Geiger
- 1985: Francie Larrieu Smith & Betty Jo Geiger
- 1986: Betty Jo Geiger
- 1987–88: Lynn Jennings
- 1989: Margaret Groos
- 1990–91: Lynn DeNinno
- 1992: Lynn Jennings
- 1993: Jody Hawkins
- 1994: Lynn Jennings
- 1995: Colette Murphy
- 1996: Anne Marie Letko
- 1997: Kim Jones
- 1998–2000: Libbie Hickman
- 2001: Elva Dryer
- 2002: Marla Runyan
- 2003: Elva Dryer
- 2004: Amy Yoder Begley
- 2005: Katie McGregor
- 2006–07: Not held
- 2008–10: Molly Huddle
- 2011: Janet Cherobon-Bawcom
- 2012: Chelsea Reilly
- 2013: Janet Cherobon-Bawcom
- 2014: Amy Cragg
- 2015: Molly Huddle
- 2016: Emily Sisson
- 2017: Aliphine Tuliamuk
- 2018: Stephanie Bruce
- 2019: Sara Hall
- 2020: Not held
- 2021: Sara Hall
- 2022: Stephanie Bruce
- 2023: Weini Kelati
- 2024: Jessica McClain

=== 7 miles ===
- 2002: Colleen De Reuck

=== 12K run ===
- 1993: Lynn Jennings
- 1994: Jody Hawkins
- 1995: Gwyn Coogan
- 1996: Anne Marie Letko
- 1997: Not held
- 1998: Susannah Beck

=== 3000 metres steeplechase ===
US National Championship winners in women's 3000-meter steeplechase
1999–present USA Track & Field	1999–2000: Elizabeth Jackson; 2001: Lisa Nye; 2002: Elizabeth Jackson; 2003: Briana Shook; 2004: Ann Gaffigan; 2005: Elizabeth Jackson; 2006: Lisa Aguilera; 2007: Jennifer Simpson; 2008: Anna Willard; 2009: Jennifer Simpson; 2010: Lisa Aguilera; 2011–12: Emma Coburn; 2013: Nicole Bush; 2014–19: Emma Coburn; 2021^{2020 OT}: Emma Coburn; 2022: Emma Coburn; 2023: Krissy Gear; 2024: Valerie Constien; 2025: Lexy Halladay-Lowry
Notes	OT: In Olympic years, the Olympic Trials have incorporated the national championships.; 2020 OT: The 2020 Olympic Trials were delayed and held in 2021 due to the COVID-19 pandemic.; Errors: In 1999, the water jump was set too low, in 2009, one barrier was set too high, both in Eugene, Oregon

=== 100 metres hurdles ===
US National Championship winners in women's 100-meter hurdles
1923–1979 Amateur Athletic Union	1923–4: Hazel Kirk; 1925–9: Helen Filkey; 1930: Evelyne Hall; 1931–2: Babe Didrikson; 1933: Simone Schaller; 1934: Not held; 1935: Jean Hiller; 1936: Anne O'Brien; 1937: Cora Gaines; 1938–9: Marie Cortell; 1940: Sybil Cooper; 1941: Lelia Perry; 1942: Lillie Purifoy; 1943: Nancy Cowperthwaite; 1944–5: Lillie Purifoy; 1946–7: Nancy Cowperthwaite; 1948–9: Bernice Robinson; 1950: Evelyn Lawler; 1951: Nancy C. Phillips; 1952: Constance Darnowski; 1953: Nancy Phillips; 1954: Constance Darnowski; 1955 Bertha Diaz (CUB) * Barbara Mueller; 1956 Bertha Diaz (CUB) * Shirley Eckel; 1957: Shirley Crowder; 1958: Not held; 1959: Shirley Crowder; 1960: JoAnn Grissom; 1961–2: Cherrie Parrish; 1963–4: Rosie Bonds; 1965–6: Cherrie Sherrard; 1967–8: Mamie Rallins; 1969: Chi Cheng (TPE) * Mamie Rallins; 1970: Mamie Rallins; 1971: Patty Johnson; 1972: Mamie Rallins; 1973–4: Patty Johnson; 1975–6: Jane Frederick; 1977: Patty Van Wolvelaere; 1978–9: Deby LaPlante
1980–1992 The Athletics Congress	1980–2: Stephanie Hightower; 1983: Benita Fitzgerald; 1984: Stephanie Hightower; 1985: Rhonda Blanford; 1986: Benita Fitzgerald-Brown; 1987: LaVonna Martin; 1988: Kim McKenzie; 1989: Lynda Tolbert; 1990: LaVonna Martin; 1991–2: Gail Devers
1993–present USA Track & Field	1993: Lynda Tolbert; 1994: Jackie Joyner-Kersee; 1995–6: Gail Devers; 1997: Melissa Morrison; 1998: Cheryl Dickey; 1999–2004: Gail Devers; 2005: Michelle Perry; 2006–7: Virginia Powell; 2008: Lolo Jones; 2009: Dawn Harper; 2010: Lolo Jones; 2011: Kellie Wells; 2012: Dawn Harper; 2013: Brianna Rollins; 2014–5: Dawn Harper Nelson; 2016: Brianna Rollins; 2017–9: Kendra Harrison; 2021^{2020 OT}: Kendra Harrison; 2022: Kendra Harrison; 2023: Nia Ali; 2024-5: Masai Russell
Notes	OT: 1932, and since 1992, championships incorporated the Olympic Trials in Olympic years, otherwise held as a discrete event.; 2020 OT: The 2020 Olympic Trials were delayed and held in 2021 due to the COVID-19 pandemic.; Distance:The event was over 60 yards until 1928, 80 meters 1929-1968

=== 200 metres hurdles ===
- 1965: Jenny Meldrum (CAN)
- 1966–68: Patty Van Wolvelaere
- 1969–72: Pat Hawkins

=== 400 metres hurdles ===
US National Championship winners in women's 400-meter hurdles
1969–1979 Amateur Athletic Union	1969–1972 (200m): Pat Hawkins; 1973: Gale Fitzgerald; 1974: Andrea Bruce; 1975: Debbie Esser; 1976: Arthurene Gainer; 1977: Mary Ayers; 1978: Debbie Esser; 1979: Edna Brown
1980–1992 The Athletics Congress	1980: Esther Mahr; 1981: Sandra Myers; 1982: Tammy Etienne; 1983: Sharrieffa Barksdale; 1984–1987: Judi Brown King; 1988: Schowonda Williams; 1989: Sandra Farmer-Patrick; 1990: Janeene Vickers; 1991: Kim Batten; 1992: Sandra Farmer-Patrick
1993–present USA Track & Field	1993: Sandra Farmer-Patrick; 1994–1998: Kim Batten; 1999–2002: Sandra Glover; 2003: Raasin McIntosh (LBR); 2004: Sheena Johnson; 2005–2006: Lashinda Demus; 2007–2008: Tiffany Ross-Williams; 2009: Lashinda Demus; 2010: T'erea Brown; 2011–2012: Lashinda Demus; 2013: Dalilah Muhammad; 2014: Kori Carter; 2015: Shamier Little; 2016–2017: Dalilah Muhammad; 2018: Shamier Little; 2019: Dalilah Muhammad; 2021^{2020 OT}: Sydney McLaughlin; 2022: Sydney McLaughlin-Levrone; 2023: Shamier Little; 2024: Sydney McLaughlin-Levrone; 2025: Dalilah Muhammad
Notes	OT: Since 1992, championships incorporated the Olympic Trials in Olympic years, otherwise held as a discrete event.; 2020 OT: The 2020 Olympic Trials were delayed and held in 2021 due to the COVID-19 pandemic.; Distance:The event was competed at 200 meters during 1969–1972

=== High jump ===
US National Championship winners in women's high jump
1923–1979 Amateur Athletic Union	1923: Catherine Wright; 1924: Not held; 1925: Elizabeth Stine; 1926–27: Catherine McGuire; 1928: Mildred Wiley; 1929–31: Jean Shiley; 1932: Jean Shiley & Babe Didrikson; 1933: Alice Arden; 1934: Not held; 1935: Barbara Howe; 1936: Annette Rogers; 1937–38: Gretel Bergmann; 1939–48: Alice Coachman; 1949: Gertrude Orr; 1950: Dorothy Chisholm; 1951–52: Marion Boos; 1953: Mildred McDaniel; 1954: Jeanette Cantrell; 1955–56: Mildred McDaniel; 1957: Verneda Thomas & Hazel Ulmer; 1958: Rose Robinson & Barbara Brown; 1959–61: Lis Josefson; 1962: Kinuko Tsutsumi (JPN); 1963–67: Eleanor Montgomery; 1968: Theresa Thresher; 1969: Eleanor Montgomery; 1970: Sally Plihal; 1971: Linda Iddings; 1972: Audrey Reid; 1973: DeAnne Wilson; 1974–77: Joni Huntley; 1978: Louise Ritter; 1979: Debbie Brill (CAN)
1980–1992 The Athletics Congress	1980: Coleen Sommer; 1981: Pam Spencer; 1982: Debbie Brill (CAN); 1983: Louise Ritter; 1984: Pam Spencer; 1985–86: Louise Ritter; 1987: Coleen Sommer; 1988–89: Jan Wohlschlag; 1990–91: Yolanda Henry; 1992: Tanya Hughes
1993–present USA Track & Field	1993: Tanya Hughes; 1994: Angie Bradburn; 1995: Amy Acuff; 1996: Tisha Waller; 1997: Amy Acuff; 1998–99: Tisha Waller; 2000: Karol Damon; 2001: Amy Acuff; 2002: Tisha Waller; 2003: Amy Acuff; 2004: Tisha Waller; 2005: Amy Acuff; 2006: Chaunté Howard; 2007: Amy Acuff; 2008–09: Chaunté Howard; 2010: Chaunté Lowe; 2011: Brigetta Barrett; 2012: Chaunté Lowe; 2013: Brigetta Barrett; 2014–16: Chaunté Lowe; 2017–19: Vashti Cunningham; 2021^{2020 OT}-23: Vashti Cunningham; 2024: Charity Hufnagel; 2025: Vashti Cunningham
Notes	OT: Since 1992, championships incorporated the Olympic Trials in Olympic years, otherwise held as a discrete event.; 2020 OT: The 2020 Olympic Trials were delayed and held in 2021 due to the COVID-19 pandemic.

=== Pole vault ===
US National Championship winners in women's pole vault
1996†: Stacy Dragila; 1997: Stacy Dragila; 1998: Kellie Suttle; 1999: Stacy Dragila; 2000: Stacy Dragila; 2001: Stacy Dragila; 2002: Stacy Dragila; 2003: Stacy Dragila; 2004: Stacy Dragila; 2005: Stacy Dragila; 2006: Jenn Suhr; 2007: Jenn Suhr; 2008: Jenn Suhr; 2009: Jenn Suhr; 2010: Jenn Suhr; 2011: Kylie Hutson; 2012: Jenn Suhr; 2013: Jenn Suhr; 2014: Jenn Suhr; 2015: Jenn Suhr; 2016: Jenn Suhr; 2017: Sandi Morris; 2018: Sandi Morris; 2019: Sandi Morris; 2021^{2020 OT}: Katie Nageotte; 2022: Sandi Morris; 2023: Katie Moon; 2024: Bridget Williams; 2025: Sandi Morris
Notes	Since 2000 the championships has incorporated the Olympic Trials in Olympic years.; The 1996 contest was a non-championship event; 2020 OT: The 2020 Olympic Trials were delayed and held in 2021 due to the COVID-19 pandemic.

=== Long jump ===
US National Championship winners in women's long jump
1923–1979 Amateur Athletic Union	1923: Helen Dinnehey; 1924: Dorothy Walsh; 1925: Helen Filkey; 1926: Nellie Todd; 1927: Eleanor Egg; 1928: Elta Cartwright; 1929: Nellie Todd; 1930: Stella Walsh; 1931: Babe Didrikson; 1932: Nellie Todd; 1933: Genevieve Valvoda; 1934: Not held; 1935: Etta Tate; 1936: Mable Smith; 1937–8: Lula Hymes; 1939: Stella Walsh (POL) * Lula Mae Hymes; 1940–41: Stella Walsh (POL) * Lucy Newell; 1942–45: Stella Walsh (POL) * Rowena Harrison; 1946: Stella Walsh (POL) * Lillian Young; 1947: Lillie Purifoy; 1948: Stella Walsh (POL) * Lillian Young; 1949–50: Mabel Landry; 1951: Stella Walsh (POL) * Nancy Phillips; 1952–3: Mabel Landry; 1954–5: Nancy Phillips; 1956–9: Margaret Matthews; 1960–2: Willye White; 1963: Edith McGuire; 1964–6: Willye White; 1967: Pat Connolly; 1968–70: Willye White; 1971: Kim Attlesey; 1972: Willye White; 1973–75: Martha Watson; 1976: Kathy McMillan; 1977–8: Jodi Anderson; 1979: Kathy McMillan
1980–1992 The Athletics Congress	1980–1: Jodi Anderson; 1982–3: Carol Lewis; 1984: Shonel Ferguson (BAH); 1985–6: Carol Lewis; 1987: Jackie Joyner-Kersee; 1988: Sheila Echols; 1989: Claire Connor; 1990–2: Jackie Joyner-Kersee
1993–present USA Track & Field	1993–6^{OT}: Jackie Joyner-Kersee; 1997–8: Marion Jones; 1999: Dawn Burrell; 2000^{OT}: Marion Jones; 2001: Jenny Adams; 2002: Brianna Glenn; 2003: Grace Upshaw; 2004^{OT}: Marion Jones; 2005: Grace Upshaw; 2006: Rose Richmond; 2007: Grace Upshaw; 2008^{OT}–12^{OT}: Brittney Reese; 2013: Janay DeLoach Soukup; 2014: Brittney Reese; 2015: Tianna Bartoletta; 2016^{OT}: Brittney Reese; 2017: Tianna Bartoletta; 2018: Sha'Keela Saunders; 2019: Brittney Reese; 2021^{2020 OT}: Brittney Reese; 2022: Quanesha Burks; 2023-25^{OT}: Tara Davis-Woodhall
Notes	OT: Since 1992, championships incorporated the Olympic Trials in Olympic years, otherwise held as a discrete event.; 2020 OT: The 2020 Olympic Trials were delayed and held in 2021 due to the COVID-19 pandemic.

=== Triple jump ===
US National Champions in women's triple jump
1980-1992 The Athletics Congress	1985–6: Wendy Brown; 1987: Sheila Hudson; 1988: Wendy Brown; 1989–90: Sheila Hudson; 1991: Carla Shannon; 1992: Sheila Hudson
1993-onwards USA Track & Field	1993: Claudia Haywood; 1994–5: Sheila Hudson; 1996: Cynthea Rhodes; 1997: Niambi Dennis; 1998: Sheila Hudson; 1999: Stacey Bowers; 2000: Nicole Gamble; 2001: Tiombe Hurd; 2002–3: Yuliana Pérez; 2004: Tiombé Hurd; 2005: Erica McLain; 2006–8: Shani Marks; 2009: Shakeema Welsch; 2010: Erica McLain; 2011–2: Amanda Smock; 2013: Andrea Geubelle; 2014: Amanda Smock; 2015: Christina Epps; 2016–19: Keturah Orji; 2021^{2020 OT}-22: Keturah Orji; 2023: Tori Franklin; 2024-5: Jasmine Moore
Notes	Since 1996 the championships has incorporated the Olympic Trials in Olympic years.; 2020 OT: The 2020 Olympic Trials were delayed and held in 2021 due to the COVID-19 pandemic.

=== Shot put ===
US National Championship winners in women's shot put
1923–1979 Amateur Athletic Union	1923: Bertha Christophel; 1924: Ester Behring; 1925–28: Lillian Copeland; 1929–30: Rena MacDonald; 1931: Lillian Copeland; 1932: Babe Didrikson Zaharias; 1933: Catherine Rutherford; 1934: Not held; 1935: Rena MacDonald; 1936: Helen Stephens; 1937: Gretel Bergmann; 1938–41: Catherine Fellmeth; 1942: Ramona Harris; 1943: Frances Gorn-Sobczak (POL) * Dorothy Dodson; 1944: Dorothy Dodson; 1945: Frances Kaszubski (POL) * Helen Steward; 1946–47: Dorothy Dodson; 1948: Frances Kaszubski (POL) * Dorothy Dodson; 1949: Amelia Wood; 1950: Frances Kaszubski (POL) * Amelia Wood; 1951: Amelia Wood; 1952: Amelia Wood & Janet Dicks; 1953: Amelia Wood; 1954: Lois Testa; 1955: Wanda Wejzgrowicz; 1956–62: Earlene Brown; 1963: Sharon Shepherd; 1964: Earlene Brown; 1965–66: Lynn Graham; 1967–68: Maren Seidler; 1969–71: Lynn Graham; 1972–79: Maren Seidler
1980–1992 The Athletics Congress	1980: Maren Seidler; 1981: Denise Wood; 1982: María Elena Sarría (CUB) * Denise Wood (3); 1983: Denise Wood; 1984: Ria Stalman (NED) * Lorna Griffin; 1985–87: Ramona Pagel; 1988: Connie Price; 1989: Ramona Pagel; 1990: Connie Price; 1991: Ramona Pagel; 1992: Connie Price-Smith
1993 onwards USA Track & Field	1993–2000: Connie Price-Smith; 2001: Seilala Sua; 2002: Teri Steer; 2003: Kristin Heaston; 2004: Laura Gerraughty; 2005: Kristin Heaston; 2006: Jillian Camarena; 2007: Kristin Heaston; 2008–09: Michelle Carter; 2010: Jillian Camarena; 2011: Michelle Carter; 2012: Jillian Camarena-Williams; 2013–16: Michelle Carter; 2017: Raven Saunders; 2018: Maggie Ewen; 2019: Chase Ealey; 2021^{2020 OT}: Jessica Ramsey; 2022: Chase Ealey; 2023: Maggie Ewen; 2024-25: Chase Jackson
Notes	Since 1992, the championships has incorporated the Olympic Trials in Olympic years, otherwise held as a discrete event.; 2020 OT: The 2020 Olympic Trials were delayed and held in 2021 due to the COVID-19 pandemic.

=== Discus throw ===
US National Championship winners in women's discus throw
1923–1979 Amateur Athletic Union	1923: Babe Wolbert; 1924: Roberta Ranck; 1925: MayBelle Reichardt; 1926–7: Lillian Copeland; 1928: MayBelle Reichardt; 1929: Rena MacDonald; 1930–1: Evelyn Ferrara; 1932–3: Ruth Osburn; 1934: Not held; 1935: Margaret Wright; 1936: Helen Stephens; 1937: Elizabeth Lindsey; 1938–40: Catherine Fellmeth; 1941: Stanisława Walasiewicz (POL) *Evelyn Taylor; 1942: Stanisława Walasiewicz (POL) *Anne Pallo (3); 1943: Frances Gorn-Sobczak (POL) * Betty Weaver; 1944: Hattie Turner; 1945: Frances Kaszubski (POL) * Hattie Turner; 1946: Dorothy Dodson; 1947–48: Frances Kaszubski (POL) * Dorothy Dodson; 1949: Frances Kaszubski (POL) * Herta Rand; 1950: Frances Kaszubski (POL) * Amelia Bert; 1951: Frances Kaszubski (POL) * Janet Dicks; 1952–3: Janet Dicks; 1954: Marjorie Larney; 1955: Alejandrina Ibarra (CUB) * Marjorie Larney; 1956: Pamela Kurrell; 1957: Olga Connolly; 1958–9: Earlene Brown; 1960: Olga Connolly; 1961: Earlene Brown; 1962: Olga Connolly; 1963: Sharon Shepherd; 1964: Olga Connolly; 1965: Lynn Graham; 1966–7: Carol Moseke; 1968: Olga Connolly; 1969–70: Carol Frost; 1971: Josephine de la Viña (PHI) * Carol Frost; 1972: Josephine de la Viña (PHI) * Olga Connolly; 1973: Jean Roberts (AUS) *Monette Driscoll (3); 1974: Joan Pavelich (CAN) * Linda Langford; 1975: Jean Roberts (AUS) *Jan Svendsen; 1976: Lynne Winbigler; 1977: Jane Haist (CAN) * Lynne Winbigler; 1978–9: Lynne Winbigler
1980–1992 The Athletics Congress	1980: Lorna Griffin; 1981: Leslie Deniz; 1982: Ria Stalman (NED) * Leslie Deniz; 1983: Leslie Deniz; 1984: Ria Stalman (NED) * Carol Cady; 1985–6: Carol Cady; 1987: Connie Price; 1988: Lacy Barnes; 1989–90: Connie Price; 1991: Lacy Barnes; 1992: Connie Price-Smith
1993–present USA Track & Field	1993–4: Connie Price-Smith; 1995: Edie Boyer; 1996: Suzy Powell; 1997: Lacy Barnes-Mileham; 1998–2001: Seilala Sua; 2002: Kris Kuehl; 2003–4: Aretha Hill; 2005: Becky Breisch; 2006: Aretha Thurmond; 2007: Suzy Powell; 2008: Aretha Thurmond; 2009: Stephanie Brown Trafton; 2010: Becky Breisch; 2011–2: Stephanie Brown Trafton; 2013–5: Gia Lewis-Smallwood; 2016^{OT}: Whitney Ashley; 2017: Gia Lewis-Smallwood; 2018–9: Valarie Allman; 2021^{2020 OT}-22: Valarie Allman; 2022-5: Valarie Allman
Notes	OT: Since 1992, championships incorporated the Olympic Trials in Olympic years, otherwise held as a discrete event.; 2020 OT: The 2020 Olympic Trials were delayed and held in 2021 due to the COVID-19 pandemic.

=== Hammer throw ===
US National Championship winners in women's hammer throw
1980-1992 The Athletics Congress	1990–1: Bonnie Edmondson^{†}; 1992: Sonja Fitts
1993-onwards USA Track & Field	1993–4: Sonja Fitts; 1995–7: Dawn Ellerbe; 1998: Windy Dean; 1999: Dawn Ellerbe; 2000–1: Dawn Ellerbe; 2002–3: Anna Mahon; 2004–5: Erin Gilreath; 2006: Jessica Cosby; 2007: Brittany Riley; 2008–9: Jessica Cosby; 2010: Amber Campbell; 2011: Jessica Cosby; 2012: Amber Campbell; 2013–4: Amanda Bingson; 2015–6: Amber Campbell; 2017: Gwen Berry; 2018–9: DeAnna Price; 2021^{2020 OT}: DeAnna Price; 2022-3: Brooke Andersen; 2024: Annette Echikunwoke; 2025: DeAnna Price
Notes	†: Held in 1990 and 1991 as non-championship event; OT: Since 2000 the national championships incorporated the Olympic Trials; 2020 OT: The 2020 Olympic Trials were delayed and held in 2021 due to the COVID-19 pandemic.

=== Javelin throw ===
US National Championship winners in women's javelin throw
1923–1979 Amateur Athletic Union	1923: Roberta Ranck; 1924: Esther Spargo; 1925: Aloa Silva; 1926: Lillian Copeland; 1927–8: Margaret Jenkins; 1929: Estelle Hill; 1930: Babe Didrikson Zaharias; 1931: Lillian Copeland; 1932: Babe Didrikson Zaharias; 1933: Nan Gindele; 1934: Not held; 1935: Sylvia Broman; 1936: Martha Worst; 1937–8: Rose Auerbach; 1939–49: Dorothy Dodson; 1950: Amelia Wood; 1951: Frances Licata; 1952: Marjorie Larney; 1953: Amelia Wood; 1954–6: Karen Anderson; 1957–60: Marjorie Larney; 1961: Frances Davenport; 1962: Karen Mendyka; 1963: Frances Davenport; 1964–7: RaNae Bair; 1968: Barbara Friedrich; 1969: Kate Schmidt; 1970–2: Sherry Calvert; 1973–7: Kate Schmidt; 1978: Sherry Calvert; 1979: Kate Schmidt
1980–1992 The Athletics Congress	1980–1: Karin Smith; 1982: Lynda Hughes; 1983–4: Karin Smith; 1985: Cathy Sulinski; 1986: Helena Uusitalo (FIN) * Donna Mayhew; 1987: Karin Smith; 1988: Donna Mayhew; 1989: Laverne Eve (BAH) * Donna Mayhew; 1990–1: Karin Smith; 1992: Donna Mayhew
1993–onwards USA Track & Field	1993–5: Donna Mayhew; 1996: Nicole Carroll; 1997: Lynda Lipson; 1998: Nicole Carroll; 1999–2000: Lynda Blutreich; 2001: Kim Kreiner; 2002: Serene Ross; 2003: Erica Wheeler; 2004–6: Kim Kreiner; 2007: Dana Pounds; 2008–11: Kara Patterson; 2012–3: Brittany Borman; 2014–5: Kara Winger; 2016: Maggie Malone; 2017–18: Kara Winger; 2019: Ariana Ince; 2021^{2020 OT}: Maggie Malone; 2022: Kara Winger; 2023: Maddie Harris; 2024: Maggie Malone-Hardin; 2025: Evelyn Bliss
Olympic Trials	The 1920, 1928 and 1932 championships, and championships in Olympic years since 1992 have incorporated the Olympic Trials, otherwise held separately.; 2020 OT: The 2020 Olympic Trials were delayed and held in 2021 due to the COVID-19 pandemic.

=== Baseball throw ===
US National Championship winners in women's baseball throw
- 1923: Elinor Churchill
- 1924: Mabel Holmes
- 1925: Ann Harrington
- 1926: Mabel Holmes
- 1927–28: Margaret Jenkins
- 1929: Gloria Russell
- 1930–32: Babe Didrikson Zaharias
- 1933: Catherine Rutherford
- 1934: Not held
- 1935: Carolyn Dieckman
- 1936: Josephine Lally
- 1937: Rose Cea
- 1938: Betsy Jochum
- 1939: Catherine O'Connell
- 1940–41: Angela Mica
- 1942: Irene Romano
- 1943: Elaine Grothe
- 1944: Hattie Turner
- 1945–47: Marian Barone
- 1948–50: Juanita Watson
- 1951: Amelia Wood
- 1952–54: Marion Brown
- 1955: Amelia Wood
- 1956: Pamela Kurrell
- 1957: Earlene Brown

=== Pentathlon and heptathlon ===
US National Championship winners in women's pentathlon and heptathlon
1950–1979 Amateur Athletic Union	1950–4: Stanisława Walasiewicz; 1955–6: Barbara Mueller; 1957–9: Ann Roniger; 1960: Jo Ann Terry; 1961–7: Pat Daniels; 1968: Chi Cheng (TPE); 1969: Jan Glotzer; 1970: Pat Daniels; 1971: Marilyn King; 1972–3: Jane Frederick; 1974: Mitzi McMillan; 1975–6: Jane Frederick; 1977: Linda Cornelius; 1978: Modupe Oshikoya (NGR); 1979: Jane Frederick
1980–1992 The Athletics Congress	1980: Themis Zambrzycki (BRA); 1981: Jane Frederick; 1982: Jackie Joyner; 1983: Jane Frederick; 1984: Cindy Greiner; 1985–6: Jane Frederick; 1987: Jackie Joyner-Kersee; 1988: Sheila Tarr; 1989: Jolanda Jones; 1990: Cindy Greiner; 1991–2: Jackie Joyner-Kersee
1993-onwards USA Track & Field	1993: Jackie Joyner-Kersee; 1994: Kym Carter; 1995: Jackie Joyner-Kersee; 1996–8: Kelly Blair LaBounty; 1999: Shelia Burrell; 2000–1: DeDee Nathan; 2002–4: Shelia Burrell; 2005: Hyleas Fountain; 2006: GiGi Johnson; 2007–8: Hyleas Fountain; 2009: Diana Pickler; 2010: Hyleas Fountain; 2011: Sharon Day-Monroe; 2012: Hyleas Fountain; 2013–4: Sharon Day-Monroe; 2015–6: Barbara Nwaba; 2017: Kendell Williams; 2018–19: Erica Bougard; 2021^{2020 OT}: Annie Kunz; 2022-5: Anna Hall
Notes	Held as a women's pentathlon from 1950 to 1980; Since 1992 the championships incorporated the Olympic Trials, otherwise held as a discrete event.; 2020 OT: The 2020 Olympic Trials were delayed and held in 2021 due to the COVID-19 pandemic.
