= Athletics at the 1955 Pan American Games – Women's 60 metres =

The women's 60 metres event at the 1955 Pan American Games was held at the Estadio Universitario in Mexico City on 13 and 14 March. It was the first of only two times that this event was contested at the Games before being discontinued after 1959.

== Medalists ==
Gold	Silver	Bronze
Bertha Díaz; Cuba	Isabelle Daniels; United States	Mabel Landry; United States

== Results ==
=== Heats ===
Rank	Heat	Name	Nationality	Time	Notes
1	1	Mae Faggs	United States	7.58	Q
2	1	Bertha Díaz	Cuba	7.66	Q
3	1	Lilián Buglia	Argentina	7.77	
4	1	Beatriz Kretschmer	Chile	7.86	
5	1	Raquel Trujillo	Mexico	8.14	
6	1	Gladys Peña	Dominican Republic	8.43	
1	2	Isabelle Daniels	United States	7.66	Q
2	2	Deyse de Castro	Brazil	7.69	Q
3	2	Lilian Heinz	Argentina	7.87	
4	2	Elda Selamé	Chile	8.10	
5	2	Sara Pantoja	Mexico	8.24	
6	2	Leonilda Miranda	Dominican Republic	8.85	
	2	Cynthia Mills	Jamaica	DNF	
1	3	Mabel Landry	United States	7.86	Q
2	3	Gladys Erbetta	Argentina	7.87	Q
3	3	Eliana Gaete	Chile	7.88	
4	3	Wanda dos Santos	Brazil	8.06	
5	3	Christina Blizzard	Mexico	8.40	

=== Final ===
Rank	Name	Nationality	Time	Notes
1st place, gold medalist(s)	Bertha Díaz	Cuba	7.5	
2nd place, silver medalist(s)	Isabelle Daniels	United States	7.6	
3rd place, bronze medalist(s)	Mabel Landry	United States	7.6	
4	Gladys Erbetta	Argentina	7.7	
5	Mae Faggs	United States	7.7	
6	Deyse de Castro	Brazil	7.8	
