= Athletics at the 1955 Pan American Games – Women's 80 metres hurdles =

Women's 80 metres hurdles at the Pan American Games

The women's 80 metres hurdles event at the 1955 Pan American Games was held at the Estadio Universitario in Mexico City on 16 and 17 March.

== Medalists ==
Gold	Silver	Bronze
Eliana Gaete; Chile	Bertha Díaz; Cuba	Wanda dos Santos; Brazil

== Results ==
=== Heats ===
Rank	Heat	Name	Nationality	Time	Notes
1	1	Gwen Hobbins	Canada	11.82	Q
2	1	Barbara Mueller	United States	11.97	Q
3	1	Eliana Gaete	Chile	13.01	Q
4	1	Delia Díaz	Uruguay	13.70	
1	2	Wanda dos Santos	Brazil	11.80	Q
2	2	Bertha Díaz	Cuba	11.81	Q
3	2	Constance Darnowski	United States	11.93	Q
4	2	Nancy Phillips-Cowperthwaite	United States	12.07	

=== Final ===
Rank	Name	Nationality	Time	Notes
1st place, gold medalist(s)	Eliana Gaete	Chile	11.7	
2nd place, silver medalist(s)	Bertha Díaz	Cuba	11.8	
3rd place, bronze medalist(s)	Wanda dos Santos	Brazil	11.8	
4	Gwen Hobbins	Canada	11.9	
5	Barbara Mueller	United States	11.9	
6	Constance Darnowski	United States	12.0	
