= Athletics at the 1959 Pan American Games – Women's 60 metres =

The women's 60 metres event at the 1959 Pan American Games was held at the Soldier Field in Chicago on 28 and 29 August.

== Medalists ==
Gold	Silver	Bronze
Isabelle Daniels; United States	Barbara Jones; United States; Carlota Gooden; Panama	

== Results ==
=== Heats ===
Held on 28 August

Wind:
Heat 1: +4.1 m/s, Heat 2: +3.6 m/s, Heat 3: +1.8 m/s, Heat 4: +0.5 m/s

Rank	Heat	Name	Nationality	Time	Notes
1	1	Isabelle Daniels	United States	7.6	Q
2	1	Heather Campbell	Canada	7.7	Q
3	1	Jean Holmes	Panama	7.8	Q
4	1	Onereida Borges	Cuba	7.9	Q
5	1	Eliana Gaete	Chile	8.5	
1	2	Barbara Jones	United States	7.3	Q
2	2	Maureen Rever	Canada	7.4	Q
3	2	Myra Fawcett	British Guiana	8.0	Q
4	2	Iris dos Santos	Brazil	8.8	Q
5	2	Bertha Díaz	Cuba	9.0	
1	3	Carlota Gooden	Panama	7.4	Q
2	3	Valerie Jerome	Canada	7.8	Q
3	3	Lidia Hernández	Cuba	7.8	Q
4	3	Yolanda Vincourt	Mexico	8.0	Q
5	3	Maria de Lima	Brazil	8.2	
1	4	Martha Hudson	United States	7.6	Q
2	4	Marcela Daniel	Panama	7.8	Q
3	4	Vilma Parris	British Guiana	8.0	Q
4	4	Wanda dos Santos	Brazil	8.3	Q
5	4	Rosalia Ridauro	Mexico	8.5	

=== Semifinals ===
Held on 28 August

Wind:
Heat 1: 0.0 m/s, Heat 2: 0.0 m/s

Rank	Heat	Name	Nationality	Time	Notes
1	1	Barbara Jones	United States	7.6	Q
2	1	Maureen Rever	Canada	7.8	Q
3	1	Jean Holmes	Panama	7.8	Q
4	1	Onereida Borges	Cuba	8.0	Q
5	1	Marcela Daniel	Panama	8.0	
6	1	Vilma Parris	British Guiana	8.1	
7	1	Iris dos Santos	Brazil	8.3	
8	1	Yolanda Vincourt	Mexico	8.3	
1	2	Martha Hudson	United States	7.6	Q
2	2	Isabelle Daniels	United States	7.7	Q
3	2	Carlota Gooden	Panama	7.7	Q
4	2	Valerie Jerome	Canada	7.8	Q
5	2	Heather Campbell	Canada	7.8	
6	2	Myra Fawcett	British Guiana	8.0	
7	2	Lidia Hernández	Cuba	??.?	
8	2	Wanda dos Santos	Brazil	??.?	

=== Final ===
Held on 29 August

Wind: +3.6 m/s

Rank	Name	Nationality	Time	Notes
1st place, gold medalist(s)	Isabelle Daniels	United States	7.4	
2nd place, silver medalist(s)	Barbara Jones	United States	7.4	
2nd place, silver medalist(s)	Carlota Gooden	Panama	7.4	
4	Martha Hudson	United States	7.4	
5	Maureen Rever	Canada	7.5	
6	Jean Holmes	Panama	7.7	
7	Valerie Jerome	Canada	7.8	
8	Onereida Borges	Cuba	8.0	
