= Athletics at the 1963 Pan American Games – Women's 80 metres hurdles =

Women's 80 metres hurdles at the Pan American Games

The women's 80 metres hurdles event at the 1963 Pan American Games was held at the Pacaembu Stadium in São Paulo on 3 and 4 May.

== Medalists ==
Gold	Silver	Bronze
Jo Ann Terry; United States	Jenny Wingerson; Canada	Wanda dos Santos; Brazil

== Results ==
=== Heats ===
Rank	Heat	Name	Nationality	Time	Notes
1	2	Jo Ann Terry	United States	11.40	Q
2	3	Wanda dos Santos	Brazil	11.63	Q
3	1	Jenny Wingerson	Canada	11.67	Q
4	3	Lorraine Dunn	Panama	11.74	Q
5	2	Thora Best	Trinidad and Tobago	11.90	Q
6	1	Leda dos Santos	Brazil	12.09	Q
7	2	Concepción Portuondo	Cuba	12.35	
8	2	Ana María Udini	Uruguay	12.92	
	1	Bertha Díaz	Cuba	DNS	
	1	Marisol Masot	Chile	DNS	
	1	Janell Smith	United States	DNS	
	2	Carlota Ulloa	Chile	DNS	
	3	Dianne Gerace	Canada	DNS	
	3	Patricia Watts	Trinidad and Tobago	DNS	
	3	Gisela Vidal	Venezuela	DNS	

=== Final ===
Rank	Name	Nationality	Time	Notes
1st place, gold medalist(s)	Jo Ann Terry	United States	11.37	
2nd place, silver medalist(s)	Jenny Wingerson	Canada	11.48	
3rd place, bronze medalist(s)	Wanda dos Santos	Brazil	11.50	
4	Lorraine Dunn	Panama	11.65	
5	Leda dos Santos	Brazil	12.05	
	Thora Best	Trinidad and Tobago	DQ	
