= Athletics at the 1959 Pan American Games – Women's 4 × 100 metres relay =

Women's 4 × 100 metres relay at the Pan American Games

The women's 4 × 100 metres relay event at the 1959 Pan American Games was held at the Soldier Field in Chicago on 2 September.

== Results ==
Rank	Nation	Athletes	Time	Notes
1st place, gold medalist(s)	United States	Isabelle Daniels, Wilma Rudolph, Lucinda Williams, Barbara Jones	46.4	
2nd place, silver medalist(s)	Panama	Marcela Daniel, Jean Holmes-Mitchell, Carlota Gooden, Silvia Hunte	48.2	
3rd place, bronze medalist(s)	Canada	Heather Campbell, Maureen Rever, Sally McCallum, Valerie Jerome	48.5	
4	Brazil	Odette Domingos, Iris dos Santos, Wanda dos Santos, Maria de Lima	51.8	
5	Mexico	Guillermina Peña, Alicia Cárdenas, Yolanda Vincourt, Rosalia Ridauro	52.3	
