= Boston 10K for Women =

Annual 10K race in Boston, Massachusetts

- Date: Columbus Day
- Location: Boston, Massachusetts, U.S.
- Event type: Road
- Distance: 10 kilometer (6.2 mi)
- Established: 1977
- Website: boston10kforwomen.com

The Boston 10K for Women, Presented by REI, formerly known as the Reebok Boston 10K for Women, Tufts Health Plan 10K for Women and the Bonne Bell Mini Marathon, is a major 10 kilometer (6.2 mi) road running race held annually in Boston on the Saturday of Columbus Day weekend. It is popular as both an elite world-class competition and a women's running event promoting health and fitness. Each year, the race draws thousands of participants and nearly 20,000 spectators.

== History ==
For many years, the race has doubled as the USA Women's 10 km Championship (USA Track & Field). It has attracted many of the world's top distance runners, including Olympic gold medalist Joan Benoit Samuelson and Olympian Molly Huddle, who each won four times, and Olympic bronze medalist Lynn Jennings, a six-time winner.

Begun in 1977 as the Bonne Bell Mini Marathon, Tufts Health Plan became title sponsor in 1985 and supported the race for 33 years. In 2018, Reebok took up the sponsorship of the race, and in 2021, REI became the presenting sponsor of the event. For several years it was the largest women-only 10K in the US, most recently in 2013.

In the 2018 race, Emily Sisson's time does not count as a course record as an off-course public safety issue caused the race course to be adjusted after it had begun, and was approximately 300 meters short.

In 2020 the in-person race was cancelled due to the COVID-19 pandemic and became a virtual event in which more than 2,000 participants from around the world registered and submitted their time.

When the race resumed in 2021, now presented by REI, Weini Kelati set a new course record and American record with a time of 31:18.

== Course ==
The race course starts on Beacon Street near the Boston Common, crosses the Charles River via the Massachusetts Avenue Bridge into Cambridge near the Massachusetts Institute of Technology, forms a loop along the river on Memorial Drive, and crosses back over the bridge and into Boston down brownstone-lined Commonwealth Avenue. The finish line on Charles Street returns the runners to the Boston Common for celebration.

== Runners ==
The race has become a Boston tradition and there are at least 10 women who have run the race every year since its inception in 1977.

== Winners ==
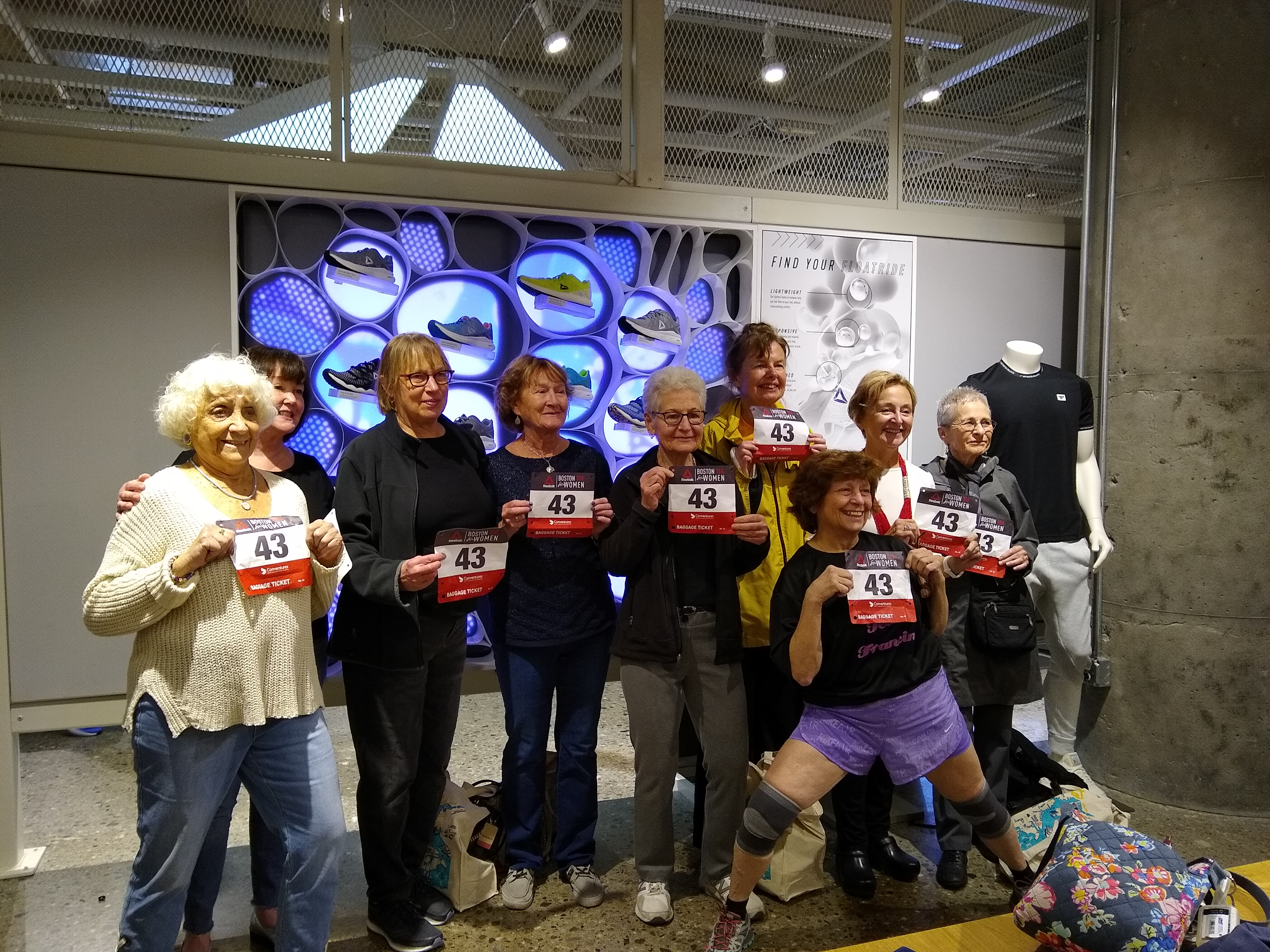
Nine women who have run every race since 1977 at the Reebok store in October 2019.

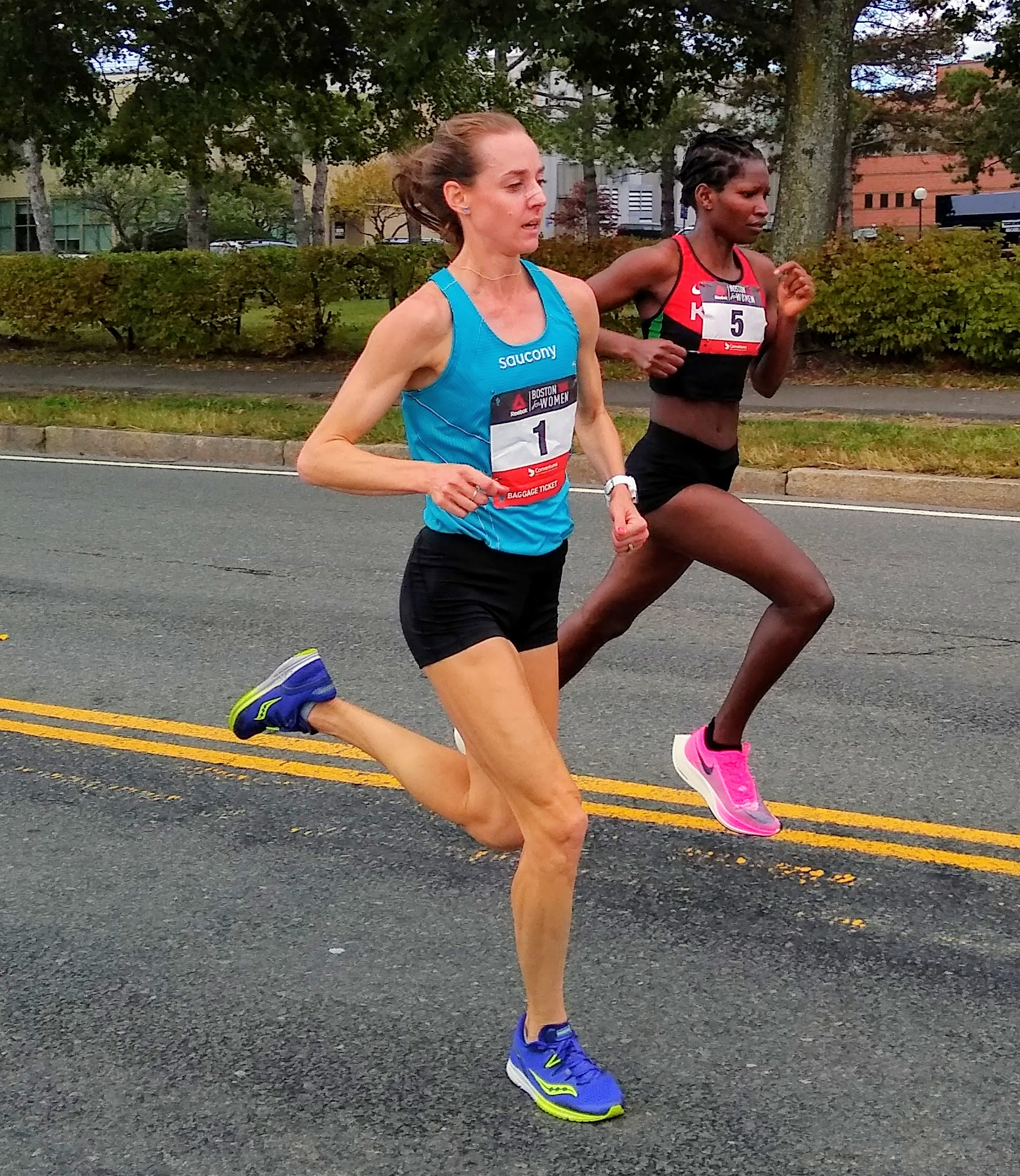
Molly Huddle and Iveen Chepkemoi at the halfway point of the Reebok Boston 10K for Women in October 2019.

2011 Tufts Health Plan 10K for Women winner Janet Cherobon-Bawcom leads the pack at the race's start.

Year	Winner	Time
2026	Rachael Rudel (USA)	31:12
2025	Emily Sisson (USA)	31:05
2024	Erika Kemp (USA)	31:48
2023	Annie Rodenfels (USA)	32:08
2022	Erika Kemp (USA)	32:14
2021	Weini Kelati (USA)	31:18
2019	Molly Huddle (USA)	31:50
2018	Emily Sisson (USA)	30:39
2017	Lauren Paquette (USA)	33:30
2016	Emily Sisson (USA)	31:47
2015	Molly Huddle (USA)	32:16
2014	Jordan Hasay (USA)	31:38.9
2013	Sentayehu Ejigu (ETH)	31:32.9
2012	Hellen Jemutai (KEN)	32:29.8
2011	Janet Cherobon-Bawcom (USA)	32:46.4
2010	Molly Huddle (USA)	31:59.9
2009	Molly Huddle (USA)	32:06.6
2008	Molly Huddle (USA)	32:51.2
2007	Deena Kastor (USA)	32:01.0
2006	Katie McGregor (USA)	32:37.5
2005	Katie McGregor (USA)	32:25.2
2004	Marie Davenport (IRL)	32:47.4
2003	Elva Dryer (USA)	32:33.3
2002	Marla Runyan (USA)	31:45.4
2001	Colleen deReuck (USA)	32:11
2000	Catherine Ndereba (KEN)	32:46
1999	Libbie Hickman (USA)	32:49
1998	Libbie Hickman (USA)	31:57
1997	Gladys Ondeyo (KEN)	32:46
1996	Gladys Ondeyo (KEN)	32:47
1995	Collette Murphy (USA)	32:30
1994	Elana Meyer (RSA)	31:39
1993	Lynn Jennings (USA)	32:02
1992	Lynn Jennings (USA)	32:22
1991	Lynn Jennings (USA)	32:12
1990	Lynn Jennings (USA)	32:39
1989	Lynn Jennings (USA)	31:57
1988	Anne Hannam (NZL)	31:38
1987	Nancy Tinari (CAN)	32:22
1986	Ingrid Kristiansen (NOR)	31:40
1985	Joan Benoit Samuelson (USA)	31:49
1984	Betty Jo Geiger (USA)	31:51
1983	Joan Benoit Samuelson (USA)	31:36
1982	Anne Audain (NZL)	31:42
1981	Jan Merrill (USA)	32:04
1980	Patti Catalano (USA)	32:24
1979	Margaret Groos (USA)	32:47
1978	Joan Benoit Samuelson (USA)	33:15
1977	Lynn Jennings (USA)	34:31
