= Annie Rodenfels =

American long-distance runner (born 1996)

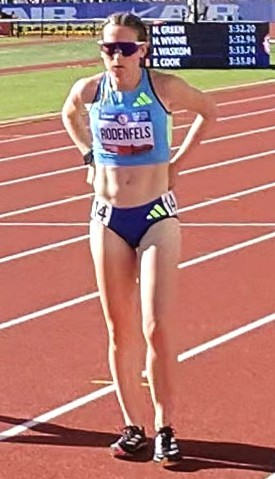
- Annie Rodenfels at the 2024 United States Olympic trials (track and field)

Personal information
- Nationality: United States
- Born: Andrea Rodenfels; July 24, 1996 (age 29) Dayton, Ohio, U.S.

Sport
- Sport: Track and field
- Event(s): 1500 m, 3000 m, 3000 m steeplechase, 5000 m, cross country
- College team: Centre College
- Turned pro: 2019
- Coached by: Lisa Owens August 2015-May 2019; Mike Caldwell and Laura Caldwell August 2019-July 2021; Mark Carroll 2021-2024; Juli Benson 2025-Present

Achievements and titles
- Personal best(s): 1500m: 4:07.33 (Concord, MA, 2024); Mile: 4:32.65 (Boston, 2022); 3000m: 8:46.07 (New York, 2024); 3000m steeplechase: 9:22.66 (Eugene, 2024); 5000m: 15:00.64 (Boston, 2025); 10,000m: 32:33.73 (San Juan Capistrano, CA, 2024)

Andrea Rodenfels (born July 24, 1996) is an American distance runner who specializes in the 3000 meter steeplechase and long-distance events. While competing for Centre College in Danville, Kentucky, she won the NCAA Division III steeplechase title in 2018 and won both the steeplechase and 5000-meter titles in 2019. She began her professional career in 2019 and later won the USATF 5000 meters Road Championship in 2023 and 2024.

== Running career ==
=== Collegiate ===
==== 2017 ====
Rodenfels placed third in the 3000 meter steeplechase at the NCAA Division III Track and Field Championship with a time of 10:36.23. Later that year, she earned All-American honors with a 12th-place finish at the NCAA Division III Cross Country Championships.

==== 2018 ====
In 2018, Rodenfels set a personal best of 17:03.27 in the 5000 meters and won the NCAA Division III title in the 3000 meter steeplechase with a winning time of 10:15.75. During her senior cross county season that fall, she won the NCAA Division III South/Southeast Region Championships and placed third at the NCAA Division III Cross Country Championships, finishing the 6000 meters course in 20:58.9. She concluded the year by running 16:44.40 in the indoor 5000 meters.

==== 2019 ====
In 2019, Rodenfels placed 2nd in the 5000 meters at the NCAA Division III Indoor Track and Field Championships with a time of 16:35.40. That spring, she became the first NCAA Division III woman to run under 10 minutes in the 3000 meter steeplechase, finishing in 9:58.83, a performance that, as of 2025 remains the Division III record. She later won national titles in both the steeplechase and the 5000 meters the NCAA Division III Outdoor Championships.

She was selected as a top 30 finalist for the NCAA Woman of the Year Award, which recognizes academic achievement, athletic excellence, community service, and leadership.

After graduation, Rodenfels lowered her steeplechase personal best to 9:57.39 at the Music City Distance Carnival. She also made her debut at the USA Track and Field Championships that summer in the same event.

=== Professional ===
==== 2019–2021 ====
Rodenfels joined ASICS Greenville Track Club-ELITE in August, 2019. She trained under coaches Mike and Laura Caldwell and competed in a range of middle- and long-distance events. Over the next two years, she recorded personal bests of 4:13.49 in the 1500 meters, 9:13.8 in the 3000 meters, 15:35.18 in the 5000 meters, and competed in the 8000 meters on the road.

In April 2021, she ran 9:46.98 in the steeplechase at the Flames Invitational to qualify for the U.S. Olympic Trials. On June 20, 2021, she competed at the Olympic Trials in Eugene, placing 30th overall with a time of 10:11.76.

Following the Trials, Rodenfels left ASICS GTC-ELITE upon the expiration of her contract. She relocated to Boston, Massachusetts, and joined the Boston Athletic Association (B.A.A.) High Performance Team, where she trained under coach Mark Carroll.

In December 2021, she lowered her 5000 meters personal best to 15:08.

==== 2022–2024 ====
In 2022, Rodenfels won the B.A.A. Invitational Mile and competed in several national-level events. She placed 7th in the 3000 meters at the USATF Indoor Championships, 2nd at the USATF 6K Road Championships, 6th in the 3000 meter Steeplechase at the USATF Outdoor Championships, and 4th at the USATF 5K Road Championships.

In 2023, she placed 3rd at the B.A.A. 5K, 12th in the 5000 meters at the USATF Outdoor Championships, and 3rd place at the USATF 6K Championship. She also won the Boston 10K for Women and the Atlanta Women's 5K, and earned her first national title at the USATF 5K Road Championships.

In 2024, she again placed 3rd at the B.A.A. 5K and finished 8th in the steeplechase at the U.S. Olympic Trials with a time of 9:22.66. Later that year, she won national titles at both the USATF 6K Road Championships and USATF 5K Road Championships.

2025–present

Rodenfels did not return to the B.A.A. after her contract expired at the end of 2024. While training independently, she ran a personal best of 15:00.64 in the 5000 meters at the Boston University John Thomas Terrier Classic. In April 2025, she signed with Salomon and made her debut with the brand at the Boston 5K on April 19. She also joined Team Meridia and began training under coach Juli Benson. Later that year, Rodenfels won the elite field at the Abbott Dash to the Finish Line 5K in New York City on November 1, with a time of 15:33.

== Achievements ==
=== National championships ===
Year	Competition	Venue	Position	Event	Time
Representing Salomon
2025	USATF Outdoor Championships	Eugene, Oregon	13th	5000 meters	15:29.62
Representing Boston Athletic Association
2024	US Women 6 km Road Running Championships (Road)	Canton, Ohio	1st	6000 meters	18:03
2024	USATF 5 km Championship (Road)	New York, New York	1st	5000 meters	15:20
2024	United States Olympic Trials (track and field)	Eugene, Oregon	8th	3000 m Steeplechase	9:22.66
2023	USATF 5 km Championship (Road)	New York, New York	1st	5000 meters	15:22
2023	US Women 6 km Road Running Championships (Road)	Canton, Ohio	3rd	6000 meters	18:33
2023	USATF Outdoor Championships	Eugene, Oregon	12th	5000 meters	15:30.26
2022	USATF 5 km Championship (Road)	New York, New York	4th	5000 meters	15:31
2022	USATF Outdoor Championships	Eugene, Oregon	6th	3000 m Steeplechase	9:36.45
2022	US Women 6 km Road Running Championships (Road)	Canton, Ohio	2nd	6000 meters	17:54
2022	USATF Indoor Championships	Spokane, Washington	7th	3000 meters	8:54.54

=== NCAA Championships ===
Year	Competition	Venue	Position	Event	Notes
Representing Centre College
2019	NCAA Women's Division III Outdoor Track and Field Championships	Geneva, Ohio	1st	3000 m Steeplechase	10:22.32
2019	NCAA Women's Division III Outdoor Track and Field Championships	Geneva, Ohio	1st	5000 meters	16:55.45
2019	NCAA Women's Division III Indoor Track and Field Championships	Roxbury, Massachusetts	2nd	5000 meters	16:35.40
2018	NCAA Women's Division III Outdoor Track and Field Championships	La Crosse, Wisconsin	1st	3000 m Steeplechase	10:15.75
2018	NCAA Women's Division III Cross Country Championship	Winneconne, Wisconsin	3rd	6000 m Cross Country	20:58.9
2017	NCAA Women's Division III Outdoor Track and Field Championships	Alliance, Ohio	3rd	3000 m Steeplechase	10:36.23
2017	NCAA Women's Division III Cross Country Championship	Elsah, Illinois	All-American	6000 m Cross Country	21:04.8

== Coaching ==
While training in Greenville, South Carolina, Rodenfels served as the head coach for cross country and track & field at Greenville Technical Charter High School for two years. During that time, two of her cross country teams qualified for the state championships, and one track & field athlete advanced to the state meet in the 100-meter hurdles.

After relocating to Boston, Massachusetts, she became an assistant coach for the Wellesley College cross country and track & field teams, where she worked with several nationally ranked NCAA Division III athletes.

== Personal life and education ==
Rodenfels was born in Dayton, Ohio, in 1996 to parents Jerry and Ann Rodenfels. She graduated from Dayton Christian High School, in 2015, where she initially played soccer before joining the track and field team during her junior and senior years.

She began competing in cross country at the collegiate level after enrolling at Centre College, where she competed at the NCAA Division III level. Rodenfels earned a bachelor's degree in Psychology and a minor in Gender Studies in 2019. She has expressed interest in pursuing a master's or PhD to conduct research focused on the psychology of women in sport.

In October 2023, Rodenfels married Collin Woodruff. Earlier that year, she publicly came out as bisexual. She has used her platform to discuss gender equity, representation in women's sports, and challenges faced by women athletes.
