= Athletics at the 1959 Pan American Games – Women's long jump =

Women's long jump at the Pan American Games

The women's long jump event at the 1959 Pan American Games was held at the Soldier Field in Chicago on 1 September.

== Results ==
Rank	Name	Nationality	Result	Notes
1st place, gold medalist(s)	Annie Smith	United States	5.73	
2nd place, silver medalist(s)	Margaret Matthews	United States	5.72	
3rd place, bronze medalist(s)	Willye White	United States	5.70	
4	Maureen Rever	Canada	5.27	
5	Eliana Gaete	Chile	5.00	
6	Iris dos Santos	Brazil	4.87	
7	Valerie Jerome	Canada	4.04	
	Vilma Parris	British Guiana	DNS	
	Patricia Power	Canada	DNS	
	Alicia Cárdenas	Mexico	DNS	
