= Athletics at the 1959 Pan American Games – Women's 80 metres hurdles =

Women's 80 metres hurdles at the Pan American Games

The women's 80 metres hurdles event at the 1959 Pan American Games was held at the Soldier Field in Chicago on 31 August and 1 September.

== Medalists ==
Gold	Silver	Bronze
Bertha Díaz; Cuba	Wanda dos Santos; Brazil	Marian Munroe; Canada

== Results ==
=== Heats ===
Wind:
Heat 1: +3.2 m/s, Heat 2: +1.2 m/s

Rank	Heat	Name	Nationality	Time	Notes
1	1	Bertha Díaz	Cuba	11.2	Q
2	1	Wanda dos Santos	Brazil	11.6	Q
3	1	Marian Munroe	Canada	11.6	Q
4	1	Shirley Crowder	United States	11.6	Q
5	1	Lorraine Dunn	Panama	12.5	
6	1	Guillermina Peña	Mexico	12.5	
7	1	Vilma Parris	British Guiana	13.0	
	1	Iris dos Santos	Brazil	DNS	
1	2	Barbara Mueller	United States	11.4	Q
2	2	Patricia Power	Canada	11.5	Q
3	2	Maria de Lima	Brazil	12.0	Q
4	2	Sally McCallum	Canada	12.0	Q
5	2	Eliana Gaete	Chile	12.0	
6	2	Jo Ann Terry	United States	12.1	
7	2	Silvia Hunte	Panama	12.3	
8	2	Benilda Ascanio	Venezuela	12.6	

=== Final ===
Wind: +1.8 m/s

Rank	Name	Nationality	Time	Notes
1st place, gold medalist(s)	Bertha Díaz	Cuba	11.2	
2nd place, silver medalist(s)	Wanda dos Santos	Brazil	11.5	
3rd place, bronze medalist(s)	Marian Munroe	Canada	11.5	
4	Barbara Mueller	United States	11.5	
5	Patricia Power	Canada	11.5	
6	Shirley Crowder	United States	11.8	
7	Maria de Lima	Brazil	11.9	
8	Sally McCallum	Canada	12.0	
