= Wanda dos Santos =

Brazilian hurdler (1932–2025)

Personal information
- Born: 1 June 1932 São Paulo, Brazil
- Died: 30 June 2025 (aged 93) São Paulo, Brazil
Medal record
Women's athletics
Representing Brazil
Pan American Games
Silver medal – second place	1959 Chicago	80 m hurdles
Bronze medal – third place	1951 Buenos Aires	Long jump
Bronze medal – third place	1955 Mexico City	80 m hurdles
Bronze medal – third place	1963 São Paulo	80 m hurdles

Wanda dos Santos (1 June 1932 – 30 June 2025) was a Brazilian female hurdler who competed at two Summer Olympics, in 1952 and 1960. She won a total number of four individual medals at the Pan American Games during her career.

== Biography ==
In addition to promoting social and sporting events for seniors, she also taught in elementary school for children of College St. Helena in the village of Gumercindo.

Dos Santos had to overcome two major barriers, in addition to the sportsbook. As a black woman she suffered several prejudices, especially in the Summer Olympics in 1952 where the other contestants, even the cordial ones, refused to stay close to or touching the Brazilian athlete.

Dos Santos was hospitalized in São Paulo on 25 June 2025 for complications from dialysis, and on 30 June, after having developed a blood infection and severe dehydration, she died at the age of 93.

== International competitions ==
Year	Competition	Venue	Position	Event	Notes
Representing Brazil
1947	South American Championships	Rio de Janeiro, Brazil	2nd	80 m hurdles	12.1
1947	South American Championships	Rio de Janeiro, Brazil	2nd	Long jump	5.16 m
1949	South American Championships	Lima, Peru	1st	80 m hurdles	11.7
1949	South American Championships	Lima, Peru	1st	Long jump	5.53 m
1951	Pan American Games	Buenos Aires, Argentina	4th	80 m hurdles	12.2
1951	Pan American Games	Buenos Aires, Argentina	4th	4 × 100 m relay	50.5
1951	Pan American Games	Buenos Aires, Argentina	3rd	Long jump	5.18 m
1952	South American Championships	Buenos Aires, Argentina	1st	80 m hurdles	11.7
1952	South American Championships	Buenos Aires, Argentina	3rd	Long jump	5.26 m
1952	Olympic Games	Helsinki, Finland	10th (sf)	80 m hurdles	11.4
1952	Olympic Games	Helsinki, Finland	21st	Long jump	5.36 m
1953	South American Championships (unofficial)	Santiago, Chile	1st	80 m hurdles	11.7
1953	South American Championships (unofficial)	Santiago, Chile	4th	Long jump	5.41 m
1954	South American Championships	São Paulo, Brazil	1st	80 m hurdles	11.4
1954	South American Championships	São Paulo, Brazil	3rd	Long jump	5.42 m
1955	Pan American Games	Mexico City, Mexico	11th (h)	60 m	8.06
1955	Pan American Games	Mexico City, Mexico	3rd	80 m hurdles	11.8
1956	South American Championships	Santiago, Chile	8th (h)	100 m	13.0
1956	South American Championships	Santiago, Chile	1st	80 m hurdles	11.5
1956	South American Championships	Santiago, Chile	5th	Long jump	5.25 m
1958	South American Championships	Montevideo, Uruguay	6th	100 m	12.9
1958	South American Championships	Montevideo, Uruguay	1st	80 m hurdles	11.5
1958	South American Championships	Montevideo, Uruguay	1st	4 × 100 m relay	48.7
1958	South American Championships	Montevideo, Uruguay	2nd	Long jump	5.48 m
1959	Pan American Games	Chicago, United States	8th (sf)	60 m	NT
1959	Pan American Games	Chicago, United States	2nd	80 m hurdles	11.5
1959	Pan American Games	Chicago, United States	4th	4 × 100 m relay	51.8
1960	Olympic Games	Rome, Italy	22nd (h)	80 m hurdles	11.84
1960	Ibero-American Games	Santiago, Chile	1st	80 m hurdles	11.5
1960	Ibero-American Games	Santiago, Chile	4th	4 × 100 m relay	49.6
1960	Ibero-American Games	Santiago, Chile	4th	High jump	1.45 m
1961	South American Championships	Lima, Peru	1st	80 m hurdles	11.5
1961	South American Championships	Lima, Peru	1st	4 × 100 m relay	48.9
1961	South American Championships	Lima, Peru	1st	Long jump	5.38 m
1962	Ibero-American Games	Madrid, Spain	1st	80 m hurdles	11.5
1962	Ibero-American Games	Madrid, Spain	3rd	4 × 100 m relay	49.4
1963	Pan American Games	São Paulo, Brazil	12th (h)	100 m	16.1
1963	Pan American Games	São Paulo, Brazil	3rd	80 m hurdles	11.50
1965	South American Championships	Rio de Janeiro, Brazil	2nd (h)	80 m hurdles	11.6^{1}
1965	South American Championships	Rio de Janeiro, Brazil	5th	Long jump	5.15 m
1967	South American Championships	Buenos Aires, Argentina	–	80 m hurdles	DNF

^{1}Disqualified in the final
