= Rachael Rudel =

American distance runner (born 1995)

Personal information
- Born: 1995 (age 30–31) Fort Collins, Colorado

Sport
- Country: United States
- College team: Colorado State University

Achievements and titles
- Personal bests: Half marathon: 1:11:37; 10km: 31:31; 5km: 15:35

Rachael Rudel (born 1995) is an American distance runner. In 2026 she won the USA 20K Championship and placed in the top three at the USA 4-Mile Championship and Bolder Boulder 10K.

== High school and college ==
Rudel grew up in Fort Collins, Colorado and attended Fort Collins High School. Her mother was a gymnast and later an endurance athlete, while her father, Rod, played for the Dallas Cowboys in the 1980s. Rudel joined the cross country team in her freshman year of high school but quit after one race. She competed in track but switched her focus from running to the triple jump, in which she placed fourth at the Colorado 5A State Championship as a sophomore. Her junior and senior years of high school were marred by illness, which she later learned was Celiac disease.

Rudel attended Colorado State University, where her battle with celiac disease and resulting weight loss forced her to abandon the explosive jumping events and switch to distance running. Rudel won the Mountain West Conference title in the 10,000 meters in 2014. She didn't compete in her final two years at Colorado State due to various health-related setbacks.

== Career ==
During the COVID-19 pandemic, Rudel resumed endurance training with Front Range Elite, a post-collegiate running team in Fort Collins, Colorado. In 2023, she was the runner-up at the USA Half Marathon Trail Championships. Two years later on the roads, Rudel ran 1:11:33 at the 2025 Indianapolis Monumental Half Marathon, placing sixth.

Rudel had a breakthrough year in 2026. She placed third overall and first for Americans at the Bolder Boulder 10K in May with a time of 32:46. Two weeks later she was the runner-up at the USA 4-Mile Championship.

In September, Rudel won the USA 20K Championship in a time of 1:04:58. In October, she won the won the Boston 10K for Women and the Abbot Dash to the Finish Line 5K.
