= 1950 South American Championships in Athletics (unofficial) =

Unofficial South American Championships in Athletics
- Dates: 11-20 February
- Host city: Montevideo, Uruguay
- Level: Senior
- Events: 30

Unofficial South American Championships in Athletics were held at the Pista del Parque Batlle y Ordoñez in Montevideo, Uruguay, between 11 and 20 February 1950. It is stated that the event was held in celebration of the 30th anniversary of the Uruguayan Athletics Federation. However, the foundation date of the Confederación Atlética del Uruguay (CAU) was already two years earlier on March 1, 1918.

This competition marked the first appearance of Paraguayan athletes in an international athletics championship.

== Medal summary ==
Medal winners are published.

=== Men ===
Event	Gold		Silver		Bronze	
100 metres	Walter Pérez (URU)	10.5	Fernando Salinas (CHI)	10.7	Enrique Falco (URU)	11.1
200 metres	Walter Pérez (URU)	21.9	Jörn Gevert (CHI)	22.7	Enrique Falco (URU)	23.0
400 metres	Pedro Laborde (URU)	52.1	Nelson García (URU)	52.1	Carlos Pereira (URU)	
800 metres	Emir Miller (URU)	1:58.9	Pedro Laborde (URU)	1:59.0	Nelson García (URU)	2:00.3
1500 metres	Raúl Inostroza (CHI)	4:02.4	Horst Knüppel (URU)	4:05.3	Emir Miller (URU)	4:09.5
3000 metres	Oscar Moreira (URU)	8:42.8	Raúl Inostroza (CHI)	8:43.4	Horst Knüppel (URU)	9:01.2
5000 metres	Oscar Moreira (URU)	14:51.6	Raúl Inostroza (CHI)	15:15.2	Gilberto Sánchez (URU)	15:47.6
10,000 metres	Oscar Moreira (URU)	31:08.7	Gilberto Sánchez (URU)	32:53.4	Juan Gau (URU)	34:07.2
12 kilometres cross-country	Oscar Moreira (URU)	38:43.8	Juan Gau (URU)	41:51.8	Álvaro Donángelo (URU)	
110 metres hurdles	Jörn Gevert (CHI)	15.2	Mario Recordón (CHI)	15.3	Nelson Coitiño (URU)	
400 metres hurdles	Nelson Coitiño (URU)	56.0	Juan Torinotti (URU)	58.6		
4 × 100 metres relay	Uruguay	43.1	Chile	43.6	Paraguay	45.4
4 × 400 metres relay	Uruguay "A"; Carlos Pereira; Nelson García; Nelson Coitiño; Pedro Laborde	3:25.9	Uruguay "B"; Nelson López; Emir Miller; Gustavo Magliano; Walter Nodaya	3:35.8	Paraguay; José Zelaya; Guillermo Krauskopf; H. Verdejo; Julio Perito	3:45.0
High jump	Hércules Azcune (URU)	1.95	Jörn Gevert (CHI); Pedro Listur (URU)	1.85	not awarded	
Pole vault	Napoleon Araujo (BOL)	3.40	Hernán Ortiz (PAR)	3.40	Ubaldo Busconi (URU)	3.30
Long jump	Eduardo Julve (PER)	6.52	Alcides Rodríguez (URU)	6.47	Hernán Figueroa (CHI)	6.45
Triple jump	Alcides Rodríguez (URU)	13.71	Jörn Gevert (CHI)	13.59	Edgar Andrade (ECU)	13.35
Shot put	Eduardo Julve (PER)	13.77	Mario Recordón (CHI)	12.80	Enrique Vázquez (URU)	12.43
Discus throw	Eduardo Julve (PER)	47.50	Hernán Haddad (CHI)	44.29	Enrique Vázquez (URU)	41.92
Hammer throw	Rubén Carrerou (URU)	50.29	Edmundo Zúñiga (CHI)	48.80	Enrique Vázquez (URU)	46.61
Javelin throw	Janis Stendzenieks (CHI)	59.90	Raúl Cóccaro (URU)	51.44	Juan Sastre (URU)	48.76
Decathlon	Hernán Figueroa (CHI)	6469	Hércules Azcune (URU)	6383	Eduardo Julve (PER)	6231

=== Women ===
Event	Gold		Silver		Bronze	
100 metres	Eliana Gaete (CHI)	12.5	Adriana Millard (CHI)	12.6	María Perla Anza (URU)	12.7
200 metres	Adriana Millard (CHI)	26.2	Beatriz Daher (URU)	27.0	Mirtha Ibarra (URU)	27.2
80 metres hurdles	Eliana Gaete (CHI)	11.8	Popelka Sosa (URU)	13.1	Juana Cal (URU)	13.3
4 × 100 metres relay	Uruguay	52.0	Chile	52.9		
High jump	Norma Morales (URU)	1.45	Carmela Antezana (BOL)	1.45	Adriana Millard (CHI)	1.45
Long jump	Adriana Millard (CHI)	5.35	Eliana Gaete (CHI)	5.11	Carmela Antezana (BOL)	4.85
Shot put	Ursula Holle (CHI)	10.59	Sara Rosello (URU)	10.37	Eler Goffer (CHI)	9.68
Discus throw	Ursula Holle (CHI)	30.01	Sara Rosello (URU)	28.72		
Javelin throw	Estrella Puente (URU)	41.14	Ursula Holle (CHI)	39.05	Adriana Millard (CHI)	

== Medal table (unofficial) ==
* Host nation (Uruguay)

Rank	Nation	Gold	Silver	Bronze	Total
1	Uruguay (URU)*	17	15	18	50
2	Chile (CHI)	10	15	4	29
3	Peru (PER)	3	0	1	4
4	Bolivia (BOL)	1	1	1	3
5	Paraguay (PAR)	0	1	2	3
6	Ecuador (ECU)	0	0	1	1
Totals (6 entries)		31	32	27	90
