= Athletics at the 1963 Pan American Games – Women's 800 metres =

Women's 800 metres at the Pan American Games

The women's 800 metres event at the 1963 Pan American Games was held at the Pacaembu Stadium in São Paulo on 28 April. It was the first time that this event was held for women at the Games.

== Results ==
| Rank | Name | Nationality | Time | Notes |
|---|---|---|---|---|
| 1st place, gold medalist(s) | Abigail Hoffman | Canada | 2:10.27 | |
| 2nd place, silver medalist(s) | Leah Ferris | United States | 2:13.79 | |
| 3rd place, bronze medalist(s) | Noreen Deuling | Canada | 2:14.98 | |
| 4 | Cynthia Hegarty | United States | 2:17.41 | |
| 5 | Maria de Lima | Brazil | 2:22.20 | |
| 6 | Aleida Polledo | Cuba | 2:30.92 | |
| 7 | Mercedes Barbosa | Mexico | 2:32.96 | |
| 8 | Eliana Gaete | Chile | 2:33.87 | |
| 9 | Aurea Arantes | Brazil | ?:??.?? | |
