= Eliana Gaete =

Chilean track and field athlete

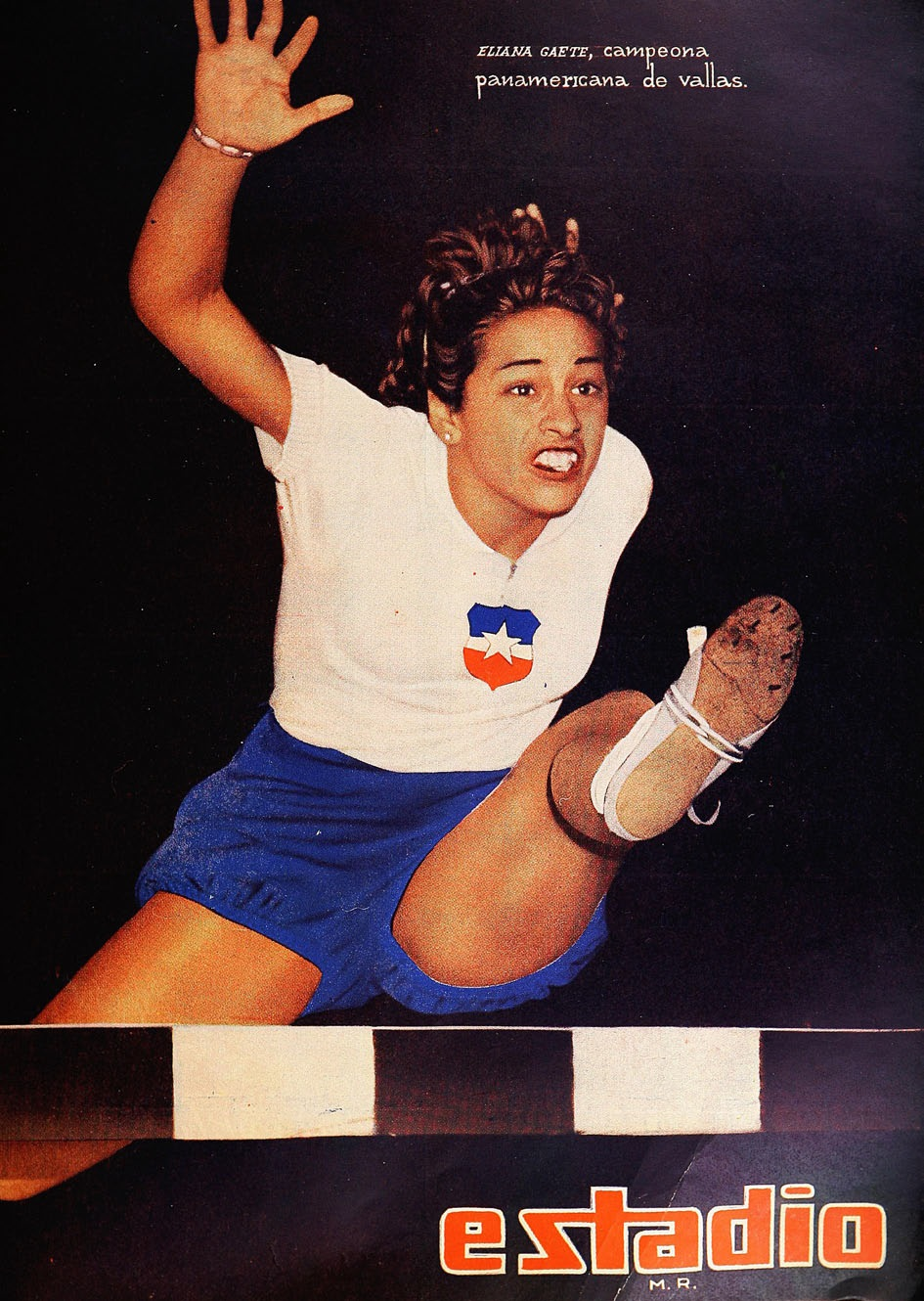

Medal record

Women's Athletics

Representing Chile

Pan American Games
Gold medal – first place	1951 Buenos Aires	80 m hurdles
Gold medal – first place	1955 Mexico City	80 m hurdles
Silver medal – second place	1951 Buenos Aires	4×100 metres

Eliana Gaete Lazo (born 14 April 1932) is a retired track and field athlete from Chile. She earned gold medals in women's 80m hurdles at the 1951 and 1955 Pan American Games. She was born in Antofagasta.

== International competitions ==
Year	Competition	Venue	Position	Event	Notes
Representing Chile
1947	South American Championships	Rio de Janeiro, Brazil	3rd	Long jump	5.13 m
1949	South American Championships	Lima, Peru	3rd	80 m hurdles	12.3 s
1949	South American Championships	Lima, Peru	2nd	4 × 100 m relay	50.8 s
1950	South American Championships (unofficial)	Montevideo, Uruguay	1st	100 m	12.5 s
1950	South American Championships (unofficial)	Montevideo, Uruguay	1st	80 m hurdles	11.8 s
1950	South American Championships (unofficial)	Montevideo, Uruguay	2nd	Long jump	25.11 m
1951	Pan American Games	Buenos Aires, Argentina	5th (h)	100 m	NT
1951	Pan American Games	Buenos Aires, Argentina	1st	80 m hurdles	11.9 s
1951	Pan American Games	Buenos Aires, Argentina	2nd	4 × 100 m relay	49.3 s
1953	South American Championships (unofficial)	Santiago, Chile	2nd	80 m hurdles	11.7 s
1953	South American Championships (unofficial)	Santiago, Chile	3rd	4 × 100 m relay	50.3 s
1954	South American Championships	São Paulo, Brazil	2nd	80 m hurdles	11.9 s
1954	South American Championships	São Paulo, Brazil	1st	4 × 100 m relay	48.4 s
1955	Pan American Games	Mexico City, Mexico	10th (h)	60 m	7.88 s
1955	Pan American Games	Mexico City, Mexico	1st	80 m hurdles	11.7 s
1955	Pan American Games	Mexico City, Mexico	3rd	4 × 100 m relay	49.49 s
1956	South American Championships	Santiago, Chile	3rd	100 m	12.4 s
1956	South American Championships	Santiago, Chile	2nd	80 m hurdles	11.6 s
1956	South American Championships	Santiago, Chile	2nd	4 × 100 m relay	49.3 s
1959	Pan American Games	Chicago, United States	17th (h)	60 m	8.5 s (w)
1959	Pan American Games	Chicago, United States	9th (h)	80 m hurdles	12.0 s
1959	Pan American Games	Chicago, United States	5th	Long jump	5.00 m
1960	Ibero-American Games	Santiago, Chile	3rd	80 m hurdles	12.0 s
1960	Ibero-American Games	Santiago, Chile	3rd	4 × 100 m relay	49.2 s
1961	South American Championships	Lima, Peru	6th	80 m hurdles	12.7 s
1962	Ibero-American Games	Madrid, Spain	4th	80 m hurdles	11.9 s
1963	Pan American Games	São Paulo, Brazil	8th	800 m	2:33.87

== Personal bests ==
- 80 metres hurdles – 11.6h (1951)
