= Estrella Puente =

Uruguayan athlete

Personal information
- Full name: Estrella Puente Buceta
- Born: 22 December 1928 Montevideo, Uruguay
- Height: 1.62 m (5 ft 4 in)
- Weight: 65 kg (143 lb)

Sport
- Sport: Athletics
- Event: Javelin throw
Medal record
Representing Uruguay
Pan American Games
| Silver medal – second place | 1955 Mexico City | Javelin throw |

Estrella Puente Buceta (born 22 December 1928) is a Uruguayan former athlete. She competed in the women's javelin throw at the 1952 Summer Olympics. She was the first woman to represent Uruguay at the Olympics. The Grand Prix Darwin Piñeyrúa and Estrella Puente, the main annual international athletics event in Uruguay, is named in her honour.

Her personal best in the event is 43.43 metres set in 1955.

== International competitions ==
| Year | Competition | Venue | Position | Event | Notes |
Representing Uruguay
| 1949 | South American Championships | Lima, Peru | 1st | Javelin throw | 37.74 m |
| 1950 | South American Championships (unofficial) | Montevideo, Uruguay | 1st | Javelin throw | 41.14 m |
| 1952 | South American Championships | Buenos Aires, Argentina | 3rd | Javelin throw | 37.89 m |
| 1952 | Olympic Games | Helsinki, Finland | 10th | Javelin throw | 41.44 m |
| 1955 | Pan American Games | Mexico City, Mexico | 2nd | Javelin throw | 43.43 m |
