= Pat Daniels =

American athlete

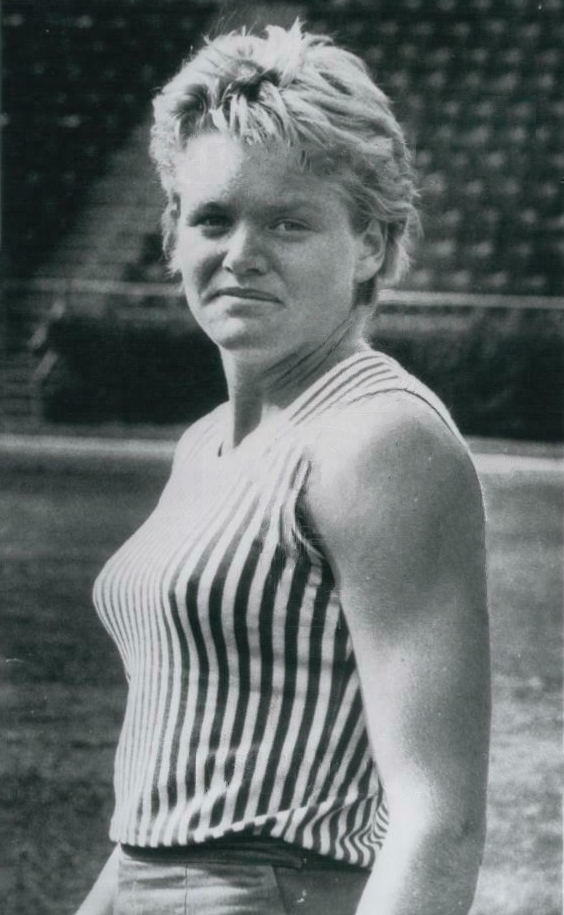
- Daniels in 1964

Personal information
- Born: Billie Jo Patricia Daniels; September 1, 1943 (age 82) Santa Monica, California, U.S.
- Education: Brigham Young University
- Height: 5 ft 11 in (180 cm)
- Weight: 165 lb (75 kg)

Sport
- Country: United States
- Sport: Athletics
- Event: Pentathlon
- Club: San Mateo Track & Field Association

Achievements and titles
- Olympic finals: 1960, 1964, 1968
- Personal best(s): 200 m – 24.0 (1967); 440 yd – 56.1 (1967); 800 m – 2:13.1 (1961); 80 mH – 11.4 (1970); 100 mH – 14.4 (1970); HJ – 1.71 m (1967); LJ – 6.25 m (1967); SP – 14.07 m (1971); DT – 40.23 m (1973); Pen – 4880 (1967)
Medal record
Representing United States
Pan American Games
Gold medal – first place	1967 Winnipeg	Pentathon

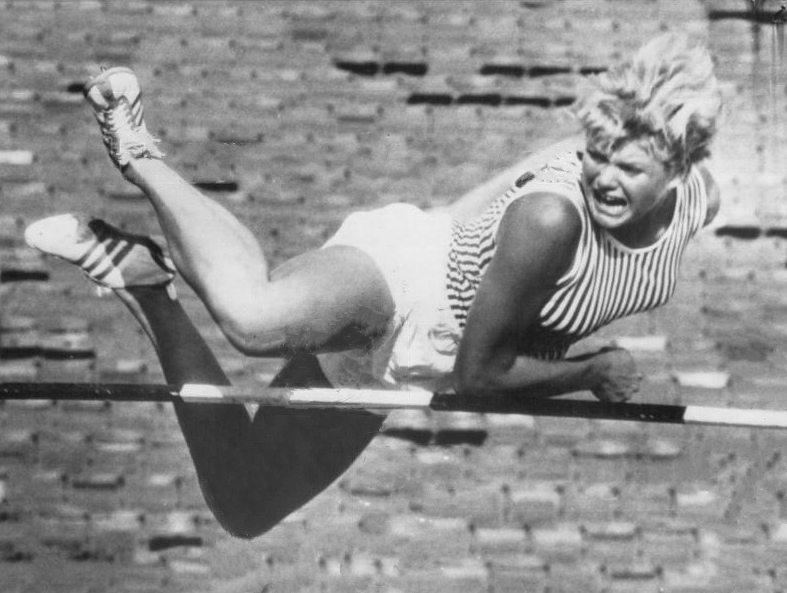
Daniels at the 1964 Olympic Trials

Billie Jo Patricia "Pat" Daniels (in first marriage Winslow, in second marriage Bank, in third marriage Connolly; born September 1, 1943) is a retired female pentathlete and track and field coach from the United States, who was the U.S. track and field national champion in the 800 m in 1960 and 1961 and in the pentathlon from 1961 to 1967 and in 1970. She was national long jump champion in 1967. She won the gold medal in the pentathlon at the 1967 Pan American Games in Winnipeg, Canada. A three-time Olympian (1960, 1964, 1968), she placed seventh in 1964 and sixth in 1968. She first represented the US in 1960, running just five days after her 17th birthday, days before beginning her senior year at Capuchino High School in San Bruno, California.

She was the first coach of the women's track and field team at the University of California Los Angeles, which she led to AIAW national championships in 1975 and 1977. In 1983, she coached UCLA alumna Evelyn Ashford to a world record in the women's 100 m, set in Colorado Springs. In 1984, she coached Ashford to gold medals in the women's 100 m and 4 × 100 m relay at the Olympic Games in Los Angeles and later that year to a new world record in the 100 m of 10.76 seconds, set in Zurich.

She became head men's and women's track and field coach at Radford University in 1998 and was named Big South Coach of the Year in 2001 before retiring the following year. In 2004, she came out of retirement to coach Allyson Felix to a silver medal and world junior record in the women's 200 m at the Olympic Games in Athens.

In 1989, she testified before a Senate hearing on steroid abuse chaired by Senator Joseph Biden. She has published numerous articles in publications, including The New York Times, on the subject of performance-enhancing drugs. She is author of Coaching Evelyn: Fast, Faster, Fastest Woman in the World. She was married to American hammer thrower and Olympian Hal Connolly until his death in 2010. In 2010, she was inducted into the African-American Ethnic Sports Hall of Fame. Also, starting in 2010, she began coaching for Gilman School in Baltimore, Maryland. She helped coach the Greyhounds to championships in the MIAA for both indoor and outdoor track and field.
