= Mabel Landry =

American long jumper and sprinter (1932–2025)

Mabel Marie "Dolly" Staton (née Landry; November 20, 1932 – February 20, 2025) was an American track and field athlete, specializing in long jump and sprints. She represented the United States at the 1952 Olympics.

== Career ==
During the preliminary round in 1952, she set the Olympic record in the long jump at 5.88 m (19 ft 3 1/4 in), which only lasted temporarily as Yvette Williams demolished her record with 6.16 m (20 ft 2 1/2 in) later in the same round. Landry finished seventh in the final, only managing one legal jump.

She also was part of the American team at the 1955 Pan American Games, winning a bronze medal in the 60 meters and a gold medal in the 4×100 meters relay anchoring a team with Isabelle Daniels, Mae Faggs, and Barbara Jones. She was a four time United States champion in the long jump. She also won two outdoor titles in the now defunct 50 meter dash. Indoors, she won the national title in the 60 yard dash twice, but did not have the opportunity to duplicate her wins in the outdoor long jump because in the 1950s, women only competed in the standing long jump.

Through her career she competed for the Chicago CYO as their only member initially. Her notoriety encouraged the all-white Hurricanes to want to join her, creating one of the first integrated track teams. She attended DePaul University on an academic scholarship before spending a career as a teacher. At age 16, on her way to the 1949 National Championships in Odessa, Texas, her coach purchased a sleeping compartment for the star athlete to rest. At 6 a.m. she was awakened by the engineer: "Get out. We just crossed the Mason–Dixon line. You have to get up front with the other coloreds." The incident led to a successful civil rights lawsuit by the CYO against the Illinois Central Railroad.

== Post-career ==
She was selected into the Chicagoland Sports Hall of Fame.

In 2008, she was presented with the DePaul University letterman's jacket. She never competed for her alma mater because at the time they did not have a track team for women, a common situation in that era.

Landry died after a long battle with cancer on February 20, 2025, at the age of 92.
