= Margaret Matthews =

American track and field athlete (born 1935)

Personal information
- Full name: Margaret Rejean Matthews
- Born: August 5, 1935 (age 91) Griffin, Georgia, U.S.
- Education: Tennessee State University
- Height: 5 ft 5 in (1.65 m)
Medal record
Women's Athletics
Representing United States
Olympic Games
Bronze medal – third place	1956 Melbourne	4 × 100 meters
Pan American Games
Silver medal – second place	1959 Chicago	Long jump

Margaret Rejean Matthews (married name Wilburn, born August 5, 1935) is an American track and field athlete who mainly competed in the 100 meters and long jump events.

She competed for United States in the 1956 Summer Olympics held in Melbourne, Australia. Matthews, a native Atlantan and captain of the TSU Tigerbelles, captured the bronze medal in the 4 × 100 meters with three of her U.S. teammates Mae Faggs, Wilma Rudolph and Isabelle Daniels. Matthews was the first American woman to leap a record 20 feet in the long jump. At the 1956 Olympic trials in Washington, D.C. she set an American record of 19 feet, 9 1/2 inches. She won the national AAU outdoor meet four straight times from 1956 to 1959. In 1958 she set a new American long jump record of 20 feet, one inch. She won a silver medal in the long jump at the 1959 Pan American Games.

Matthews was born in Griffin, Georgia. She was the first person in her family to finish high school and has devoted 35 years to public education in Memphis. Her son, Barry Todd Wilburn, played professional football in the NFL. In 1997 she was inducted into the Georgia Sports Hall of Fame and in 1998 into the Tennessee Sports Hall of Fame.
