= Syd Koff =

American athlete

Sybil Koff
Personal information
- Full name: Sybil (Syd) C. Koff Cooper
- Nickname: Syd
- National team: United States
- Born: Sybil Tabachnikoff; 1911 Lower East Side, Manhattan, New York City, United States
- Died: May 20, 1998 (85 years of age) New York City, New York
- Home town: Brooklyn, New York City, New York
- Education: Parson's Art School; Art Students League; Toledo University
- Occupations: Artist and ceramist
- Weight: 115 lb (52 kg)
- Children: 2 sons, Stephen and Ellis

Sport
- Country: United States
- Sport: Track & field
- Events: sprint, hurdles, broad jump, high jump, shot put, and triathlon
- Club: Millrose Athletic Club and German-American Athletic Club

Achievements and titles
- National finals: 80-yard hurdles US national champion (1940)
Medal record
Women's athletics
Representing United States
Maccabiah Games
Gold medal – first place	1932 Israel	100m dash
Gold medal – first place	1932 Israel	broad jump
Gold medal – first place	1932 Israel	high jump
Gold medal – first place	1932 Israel	triathlon
Gold medal – first place	1935 Israel	60m dash
Gold medal – first place	1935 Israel	200m dash
Gold medal – first place	1935 Israel	400m hurdles
Silver medal – second place	1935 Israel	broad jump

Sybil C. Koff, known primarily as Syd Koff, born Sybil Tabachnikoff, later known as Sybil Cooper (1912 – May 20, 1998) was an American sprinter, hurdler, broad jumper, high jumper, shot putter, and triathlete. She competed in the 1932 Maccabiah Games in Mandatory Palestine, winning four gold medals, and at the 1935 Maccabiah Games, winning three gold medals. She was the 1931 New York metropolitan champion runner, won the 1935 200m Metropolitan Amateur Athletic Union (AAU) title, won the 1936 running broad jump Women's Metropolitan Championship, and was the 1940 80-yard hurdles US national champion. She qualified for the 1936 Summer Olympic Games in the broad jump and high jump events, but boycotted the Games, as they were held in Nazi Germany. She also qualified for the 1940 Summer Olympic Games, but they were cancelled during World War II.

== Biography ==
=== Early life ===
Koff was born on the Lower East Side in Manhattan, New York City, to Russian immigrants, and was Jewish. She grew up in Bensonhurst in Brooklyn, New York. She attended Washington Irving High School and then New Utrecht High School, from which she graduated in 1929. She also studied art at Parson's Art School, the Art Students League, and Toledo University.

=== Track and field career ===
As background, starting in 1914, the Amateur Athletic Union (AAU) had barred women athletes from competing in events that it sponsored. In 1922, the Metropolitan AAU in New York City approved a program of sanctioned events for women, but still barred them from running events over one-half mile, because the events were considered too strenuous. The reason given was that if a woman were allowed to run more than a half-mile, she would put her reproductive health at risk.

When Koff was a girl, to compete in running she had to sneak out of her parents' house to compete against their wishes in high school and amateur track and field competitions. In 1930, after seeing her practicing the broad jump on the sand in Manhattan Beach, Brooklyn, a member of the Millrose Athletic Club convinced her to join the club.

She was the New York metropolitan champion runner in 1931. In 1932, Koff won national championships in low hurdles and broad jump.

Koff competed in the 1932 Maccabiah Games in Mandatory Palestine, when she was 19 years old, leaving New York for Plymouth on the SS Majestic, and then sailing in a later leg of the trip on the SS Patria. She carried the American flag in the Game's opening ceremony. She won gold medals in the 100m dash (in front of a crowd of 25,000), the broad jump, the high jump, and the women's triathlon (consisting of the 100 m dash, broad jump, and shot put). Focus on her was so great that after the Games, young women in Tel Aviv began to wear berets at a "jaunty angle," as she was given to doing. She stayed in Palestine for two years, working at finding pottery shards for King George V.

A 1934 article in the Brooklyn Daily Eagle described Koff as follows: "... you would never believe Syd Koff to be a sprinter and jumper. ... although tall and exceedingly well built, [she] is pleasant looking and indeed quite attractive. She lacks the hard features so commonly associated with the female athlete." Two years later, an article in the same paper observed: "Syd Koff is one of those pleasant creatures who would rather conquer the world all by her pleasant self than stay home and do the dishes."

Koff won the 1934 Kings County High Jump Championship. In 1935 she won the 200m Metropolitan AAU title.

In a meet in February 1935 at the 102nd Engineers Armory in New York City held to assist in the picking of those who would represent the United States at the 1935 Maccabiah Games, Koff won gold medals in the 80m low hurdles, the 100m dash, and the running high jump. She competed for the German-American Athletic Club. She had wanted to also compete in the 60m dash and the 8-pound shot put, but AAU rules restricted her to competing in a maximum of three events.

Koff competed in the 1935 Maccabiah Games in Tel Aviv, Mandatory Palestine. She and the other American athletes traveled to Palestine on the SS President Roosevelt, a trip which took three weeks and which included legs traveled by train, donkey cart, and camel.

At the 1935 Maccabiah Games, Koff won gold medals in the 60m dash, the 200m dash, and the 400m hurdles, and won a silver medal in the broad jump. After the Games concluded, she remained in Palestine to give "herself a few more weeks to decide whether she would stay permanently."

In 1935 The American Hebrew referred to Koff as the "leading Jewish girl athlete of the year." On May 6, 1936, the Brooklyn Daily Eagle ran an article on her entitled: "Syd Koff – Bensonhurst’s One-Girl Track Team." The Jewish Press named her to its 1935 Honor Roll of Jews in Sports, along with among others baseball player Hank Greenberg, boxers Barney Ross and Bob Olin, fencer Helene Mayer, tennis players Henry Prusoff and Maud Rosenbaum, golfer Herman Barron, football players Izzy Weinstock and David Smukler, and ice hockey player Alex Levinsky.

In June 1936, Koff competed in the Women's Metropolitan AAU Track and Field Championships in Castle Hill Park in New York City. She won the running broad jump, and finished second in the 50m dash.

Koff qualified for the 1936 Summer Olympic Games in the broad jump and high jump events. She did not compete, as she joined other Jewish athletes including American 1932 Olympic champion discus thrower Lillian Copeland, American hurdles world record holder Milton Green, and American swimmer Charlotte Epstein who boycotted the Games, as the Games were held in Nazi Germany.

In August 1938, Koff came in fourth in the women's 80-yard hurdles 1939 US national championship at the AAU Outdoor Women's Track Championships in Naugatuck, Connecticut. In September 1939, Koff came in second in the women's 80-yard hurdles 1939 US national championship at the AAU Outdoor Women's Track Championships in Waterbury, Connecticut.

In July 1940, Koff won the women's 80-yard hurdles 1940 US National Championship at the AAU Outdoor Women's Track Championships in Ocean City, New Jersey.

She also qualified for the 1940 Summer Olympic Games. Koff missed competing in those Olympic Games as well, as in 1940 Russia bombed the Olympic stadium in Helsinki, Finland, and the 1940 Olympics were cancelled.

=== Later life ===
Koff later lived on the Lower East Side, and then in Greenwich Village, New York City, and Flatbush, Brooklyn, New York, where she was an artist and ceramist. She married and had two sons, Stephen (who in 1966 became the intercollegiate pocket billiards champion, and later became a sculptor and artist) and Ellis (who became a mathematical physicist). From the 1960s until she broke her hip in 1972, she competed in track and field in the Masters’ division. In 1984, she and her son Steve became co-owners of the Sybille Gallery of Art and Framing in Greenwich Village.

Koff died in New York City at 85 years of age on May 20, 1998, from cardiac arrest. She was survived by her sons Ellis and Steve.
