= Margaret Jenkins (athlete) =

American discus thrower (1903–1996)

Personal information
- Nationality: American
- Born: July 2, 1903
- Died: January 8, 1996 (aged 92)
- Education: San Jose State Teachers College

Sport
- Sport: Athletics
- Event: Discus throw

Margaret Jenkins (July 2, 1903 – January 8, 1996) was an American athlete. She attended the San Jose State Teachers College (now San Jose State University). She competed in the women's discus throw at the 1928 Summer Olympics and the 1932 Summer Olympics.
