= USA Track & Field Championships =

The USA Track & Field Championships may refer to:

- USA Outdoor Track and Field Championships
- USA Indoor Track and Field Championships
