= Mamie Rallins =

American hurdler (1941–2016)

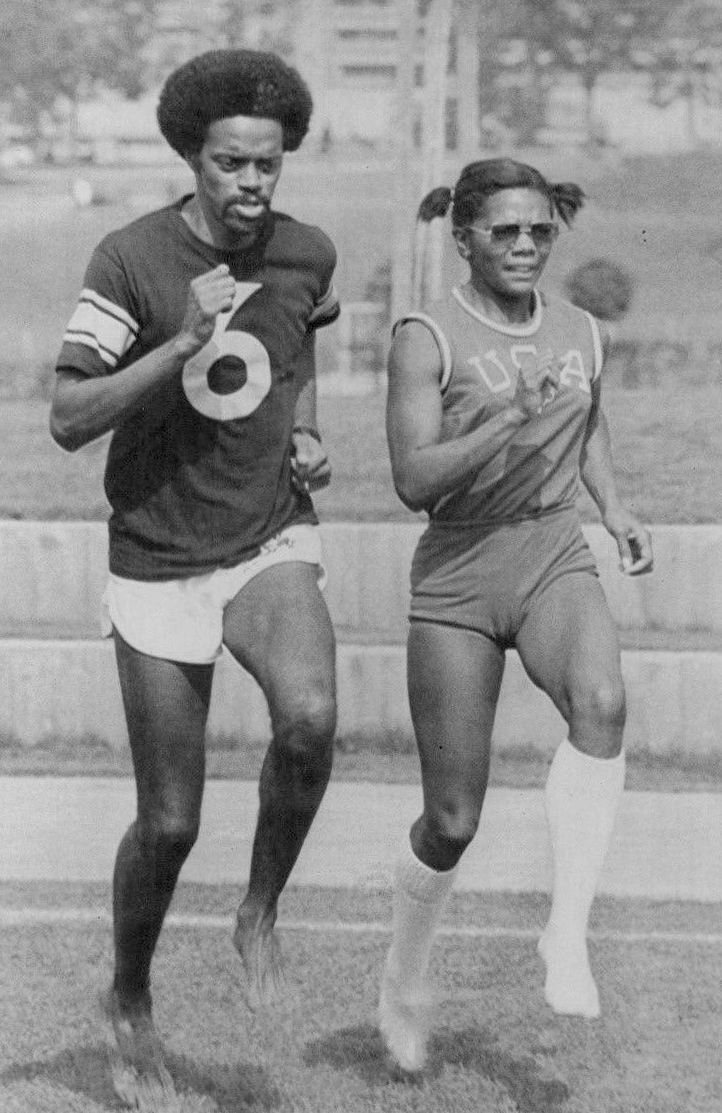
- Ralph Boston and Mamie Rallins at the 1972 Olympics

Personal information
- Born: July 8, 1941 Chicago, Illinois, USA
- Died: May 16, 2016 (aged 74) Sandusky County, Ohio, USA
- Height: 168 cm (5 ft 6 in)
- Weight: 61 kg (134 lb)

Sport
- Sport: Athletics
- Events: Sprint, hurdles
- Club: TSU Tigers, Nashville

Achievements and titles
- Personal bests: 100 m – 12.1 (1968); 200 m – 24.4 (1972); 80 mH – 10.69 (1968); 100 mH – 13.2 (1972)
Medal record
Representing the United States
Pan American Games
Silver medal – second place	1967 Winnipeg	80 m hurdles

Mamie Annette Rallins (July 8, 1941 – May 16, 2016) was an American hurdler. She competed at the 1968 and 1972 Summer Olympics and later coached many future Olympians.

== Early life ==
Rallins started running when she was a teenager: "At the age of 15, I started running track for a track club, because we did not have track and field in the high schools in the '50s". She then began running for the Mayor Daley Youth Foundation in Chicago. Rallins realized this was much more than an enjoyable hobby and knew running was going to play a large part in her future. Rallins was a 1976 graduate of Tennessee State University, she began running hurdles for their track and field team her freshman year. She also joined the Amateur Athletic Union (AAU), and won four outdoor high hurdle championships. She triumphed in the 80 meter high hurdles in 1967–1968 and at the 100 meters in 1970 and 1972. Rallins also won a silver medal in the 80-meter hurdles at the 1967 Pan American Games. Rallins competed in numerous competitions in her days; however, nothing would compare to her time spent running in the Olympics.

== 1968 Olympics ==
The United States had quite the woman's track and field team in the 1968 Mexico City Olympics. Sports Illustrated said the team was, "The best women's track and field team it had ever had—more mobile, stronger, deeper and faster than anything before". Rallins, along with her other teammates were coached by Ed Temple. This was the first Olympics in which Rallins competed; she was only 27 at the time. She ran the 80-meter hurdles for her team and won the first heat running it in 10.6 seconds. In the semi-finals, she placed fifth running it in 10.7 seconds. Sports Illustrated covered the Olympics and in one of their articles they wrote the following about Rallins: "Mamie Rallins, that tiny-waisted thing who does not look strong enough to handle a hurdle, always does. It was typical: the gun went off and here came Mamie—who had politely waited for the other girls to start first, since Mamie is courteous that way—suddenly moving so fast that she seemed to be taking tippy-toes steps between the hurdles and passing everybody easily. When it was over, she ran a few dainty steps beyond the finish, stopped and threw her head back in a sort of madcap gesture". Despite coming in fifth in the 80-meter hurdles, in 1969 she was ranked the top hurdler in the world according to MEAC/ SWAC Sports Main Street.

== 1972 Olympics ==
Rallins also competed in the 1972 Munich Germany Olympics when she was 31, running the 100-meter hurdles for the United States. In the first round, she placed third running it in 13.51 seconds. In the semi-finals, her time was 13.75 seconds, putting her in seventh place. She missed making the Munich Olympic finals by 0.001 of a second. This is something that Rallins will never forget, "I missed the final in a photo-finish by one-thousandth of a second," she said. "The speaker in my (starting) blocks didn't work and I couldn't hear the commands (from the starter). I got out late and I couldn't make it up at the finish line. "While this was extremely disheartening, Rallins continued to be connected to the Olympics for many years to follow by coaching future Olympians.

== Coaching career ==
Rallins was equally as successful coaching as she was at running. She was an effective coach on both the nation and international level, coaching as the head coach of the U.S. Indoor World Championship team in 1987. "She also served as assistant coach of the USA Olympic Games in 1996, the 1995 World University Games, the 1981 USA vs. USSR Meet and the World University Games in 1979. Rallins was also the Head Coach at Ohio State University of the Women's Track and Field and Cross Country team for 18 years (1976–94). She was also the first black woman to ever coach at Ohio State University "During that time, she coached 60 Big Ten indoor/outdoor champions, 24 All Americans, nine Olympic trial qualifiers and one Olympian. She also served as assistant athletic director for three years." After her coaching career at Ohio State University, she was the Olympic head manager for the USA women's track team in 2000 in Sydney, Australia. She was fatally injured in a car accident on May 16, 2016, in Fremont, Ohio on State Route 53.
