= Constance Darnowski =

American hurdler (1934–2023)

Personal information
- Born: December 10, 1934 Brooklyn, New York, U.S.
- Died: August 2, 2023 (aged 88)

Sport
- Sport: Track and field
- Event: 80 metres hurdles

Constance Darnowski (December 10, 1934 – August 2, 2023) was an American hurdler. She competed in the 80 metres hurdles at the 1952 Summer Olympics and the 1956 Summer Olympics.

Darnowski died on August 2, 2023, at the age of 88.
