= Libbie Hickman =

American long-distance runner

Personal information
- Born: February 17, 1965 (age 61)
- Height: 5 ft 6 in (1.68 m)
- Weight: 115 lb (52 kg)

Sport
- Country: United States
- Event(s): 5000 m, 10,000 m, marathon
- College team: Colorado State Rams

Achievements and titles
- Olympic finals: 2000,10,000 m, 16th in final
- Personal best: 10000 m: 31.41.33

Libbie Hickman (née Johnson) (born February 17, 1965) is an American former track and field athlete who competed in long-distance running events. Hickman represented the United States at the 2000 Summer Olympics in the 10,000 m.

Hickman is the daughter of an oil company executive and attended high school in Cairo, Egypt. Hickman and Catherine Ndereba had a memorable race at the 2000 Beach to Beacon race; they both finished in the same time, but Hickman celebrated after crossing the "ceremonial tape". Ndereba ran the final step to the official finish line and was awarded the win.
