= Athletics at the 1955 Pan American Games =

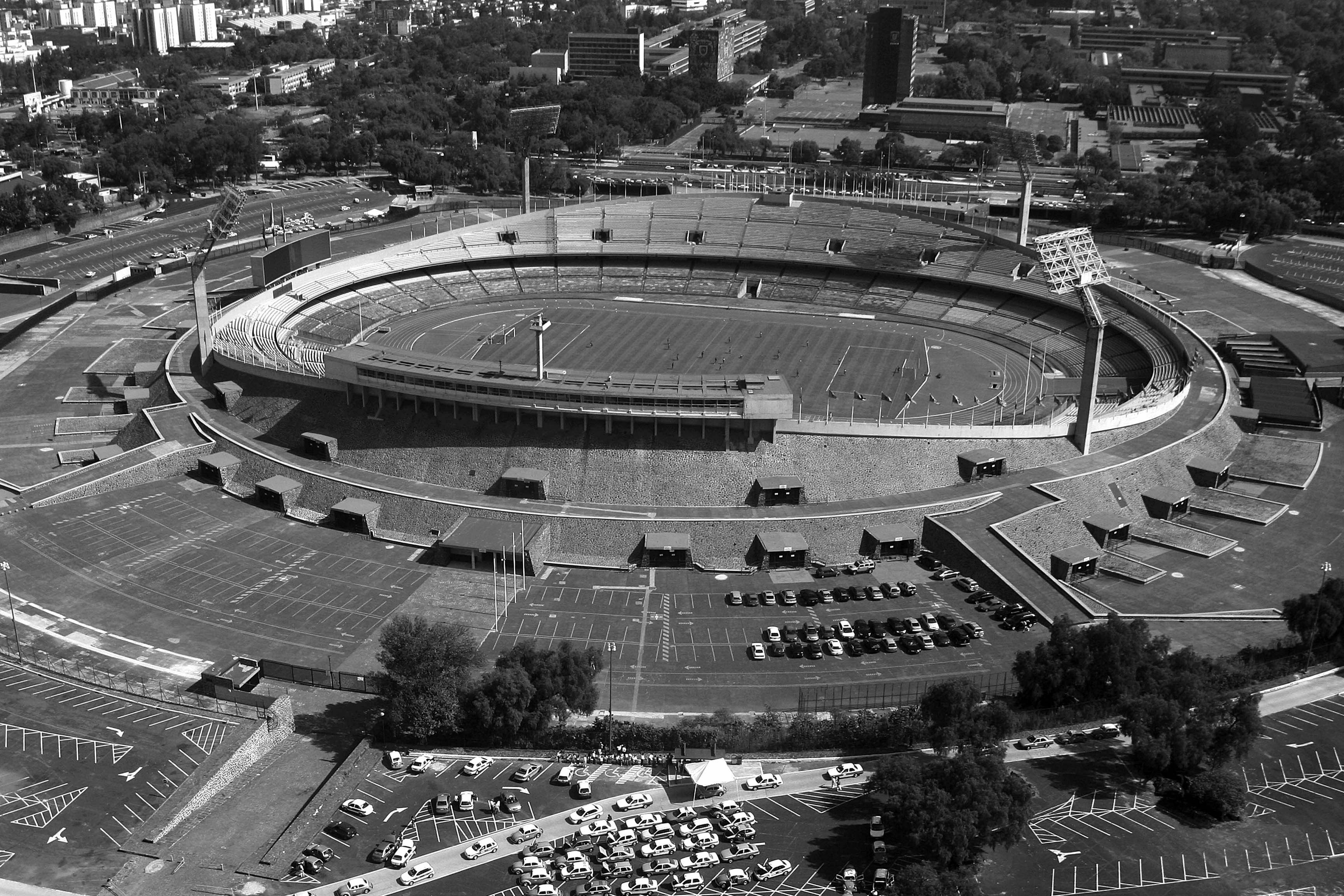
- Dates: 13–19 March
- Host city: Mexico City, Mexico
- Venue: Estadio Universitario
- Level: Senior
- Events: 29
- Participation: 242 athletes from 20 nations

The athletics competition at the 1955 Pan American Games was held in Mexico City, Mexico.

== Medal summary ==
=== Men's events ===
| Event | Gold | | Silver | | Bronze | |
|---|---|---|---|---|---|---|
| 100 metres | Rod Richard; United States | 10.3A GR | Mike Agostini; Trinidad and Tobago | 10.4A | Willie Williams; United States | 10.4A |
| 200 metres | Rod Richard; United States | 20.94A GR | Charles Thomas; United States | 21.42A | José Telles da Conceição; Brazil; Mike Agostini; Trinidad and Tobago | 21.66A; 21.67A |
| 400 metres | Lou Jones; United States | 45.68A WR | Jim Lea; United States | 45.78A | Jesse Mashburn; United States | 46.44A |
| 800 metres | Arnie Sowell; United States | 1:49.86A GR | Lon Spurrier; United States | 1:50.51A | Ramón Sandoval; Chile | 1:52.52A |
| 1500 metres | Juan Miranda; Argentina | 3:53.30A GR | Wes Santee; United States | 3:53.44A | Fred Dwyer; United States | 3:56.04A |
| 5000 metres | Osvaldo Suárez; Argentina | 15:30.6A | Horace Ashenfelter; United States | 15:31.4A | Jaime Correa; Chile | 15:39.2A |
| 10,000 metres | Osvaldo Suárez; Argentina | 32:42.6A | Vicente Sánchez; Mexico | 33:00.4A | Jaime Correa; Chile | 33:42.6A |
| Marathon | Doroteo Flores; Guatemala | 2:59:10A | Onésimo Rodríguez; Mexico | 3:02:22A | Luis Velásquez; Guatemala | 3:05:26A |
| 110 metres hurdles (wind: 0.0 m/s) | Jack Davis; United States | 14.44A | Keith Gardner; Jamaica | 14.74A | Evaristo Iglesias; Cuba | 14.94A |
| 400 metres hurdles | Josh Culbreath; United States | 51.5A GR | Jaime Aparicio; Colombia | 51.8A | Wilson Carneiro; Brazil | 53.0A |
| 3000 metres steeplechase | Guillermo Solá; Chile | 9:46.8A | Santiago Novas; Chile | 9:50.4A | Eligio Galicia; Mexico | 9:54.2A |
| 4 × 100 metres relay | United States; Willie Williams; John Bennett; Charles Thomas; Rod Richard | 40.96A GR | Venezuela; Clive Bonas; Apolinar Solórzano; Guillermo Gutiérrez; Juan Leiva | 41.36A | Mexico; Alberto Goya; René Ahumada; Javier Souza; Sergio Higuera | 41.94A |
| 4 × 400 metres relay | United States; Jesse Mashburn; Lon Spurrier; Jim Lea; Lou Jones | 3:07.43A GR | Jamaica; Keith Gardner; Richard Stick; Mel Spence; Allan Moore | 3:12.63A | Venezuela; Guillermo Gutiérrez; Apolinar Solórzano; Evaristo Edie; Juan Leiva | 3:15.93A |
| High jump | Ernie Shelton; United States | 2.01A GR | Herman Wyatt; United States | 2.01A | José Telles da Conceição; Brazil | 1.91A |
| Pole vault | Bob Richards; United States | 4.50A =GR | Bobby Smith; United States | 4.30A | Don Laz; United States | 4.30A |
| Long jump | Rosslyn Range; United States | 8.03A GR | John Bennett; United States | 8.01A | Ary de Sá; Brazil | 7.84A |
| Triple jump | Adhemar da Silva; Brazil | 16.56A WR | Asnoldo Devonish; Venezuela | 16.13A | Víctor Hernández; Cuba | 15.60A |
| Shot put | Parry O'Brien; United States | 17.59A GR | Fortune Gordien; United States | 15.98A | Marty Engel; United States | 14.62A |
| Discus throw | Fortune Gordien; United States | 53.10A GR | Parry O'Brien; United States | 51.07A | Hernán Haddad; Chile | 47.14A |
| Hammer throw | Bob Backus; United States | 54.91A GR | Marty Engel; United States | 53.36A | Elvio Porta; Argentina | 51.45A |
| Javelin throw | Franklin "Bud" Held; United States | 69.77A GR | Ricardo Héber; Argentina | 66.15A | Reinaldo Oliver; Puerto Rico | 65.56A |
| Decathlon | Rafer Johnson; United States | 6994A | Bob Richards; United States | 6886A | Hernán Figueroa; Chile | 5740A |

=== Women's events ===
| Event | Gold | | Silver | | Bronze | |
|---|---|---|---|---|---|---|
| 60 metres | Bertha Díaz; Cuba | 7.5A | Isabelle Daniels; United States | 7.6A | Mabel Landry; United States | 7.6A |
| 100 metres | Barbara Jones; United States | 11.90A GR | Mae Faggs; United States | 12.07A | María Luisa Castelli; Argentina | 12.38A |
| 80 metres hurdles | Eliana Gaete; Chile | 11.7A | Bertha Díaz; Cuba | 11.8A | Wanda dos Santos; Brazil | 11.8A |
| 4 × 100 metres relay | United States; Isabelle Daniels; Mabel Landry; Mae Faggs; Barbara Jones | 47.12A GR | Argentina; Lilián Heinz; Lilián Buglia; Gladys Erbetta; María Luisa Castelli | 47.27A | Chile; Betty Kretschmer; Carmen Venegas; Eliana Gaete; Elda Selamé | 49.49A |
| High jump | Mildred McDaniel; United States | 1.685A | Deyse de Castro; Brazil | 1.59A | Verneeda Thomas; United States | 1.59A |
| Discus throw | Ingeborg Pfüller; Argentina | 43.19A GR | Isabel Avellán; Argentina | 40.06A | Alejandrina Herrera; Cuba | 38.00A |
| Javelin throw | Karen Anderson; United States | 49.15A | Estrella Puente; Uruguay | 43.43A | Amelia Wershoven; United States | 43.06A |

A = affected by altitude

== Medal table ==
| Rank | Nation | Gold | Silver | Bronze | Total |
|---|---|---|---|---|---|
| 1 | United States | 20 | 14 | 8 | 42 |
| 2 | Argentina | 4 | 3 | 2 | 9 |
| 3 | Chile | 2 | 1 | 6 | 9 |
| 4 | Brazil | 1 | 1 | 5 | 7 |
| 5 | Cuba | 1 | 1 | 3 | 5 |
| 6 | Guatemala | 1 | 0 | 1 | 2 |
| 7 | Mexico | 0 | 2 | 2 | 4 |
| 8 | Venezuela | 0 | 2 | 1 | 3 |
| 9 | Jamaica | 0 | 2 | 0 | 2 |
| 10 | Trinidad and Tobago | 0 | 1 | 1 | 2 |
| 11 | Colombia | 0 | 1 | 0 | 1 |
| 11 | Uruguay | 0 | 1 | 0 | 1 |
| 13 | Puerto Rico | 0 | 0 | 1 | 1 |
| Totals (13 entries) | | 29 | 29 | 30 | 88 |

== Participating nations ==
- Argentina (17)
- Bahamas (2)
- Brazil (17)
- Canada (13)
- Chile (16)
- Colombia (9)
- Costa Rica (1)
- Cuba (12)
- Dominican Republic (8)
- Guatemala (8)
- Jamaica (7)
- Mexico (47)
- Netherlands Antilles (4)
- Paraguay (2)
- Puerto Rico (5)
- El Salvador (1)
- Trinidad and Tobago (2)
- United States (50)
- Uruguay (4)
- Venezuela (17)
