= Bertha Díaz =

Cuban sprinter (1936–2019)

Berta Díaz
Personal information
- Full name: Julia Berta Díaz Hernández
- Born: October 1, 1936 Havana, Ciudad de la Habana, Cuba
- Died: November 20, 2019 (aged 83) Miami, Florida, United States
- Height: 1.65 m (5 ft 5 in)
- Weight: 67 kg (148 lb)
Medal record
Women's athletics
Representing Cuba
Pan American Games
Gold medal – first place	1955 Mexico City	60 metres
Gold medal – first place	1959 Chicago	80m Hurdles
Silver medal – second place	1955 Mexico City	80m Hurdles
Central American and Caribbean Games
Gold medal – first place	1962 Kingston	80m Hurdles
Gold medal – first place	1962 Kingston	Long Jump

Julia Berta Díaz Hernández (October 1, 1936 – November 20, 2019), known as Berta Díaz, was a sprinter from Cuba, who also competed in the long jump and the hurdling events during her career. She represented her native country at two consecutive Summer Olympics, starting in 1956. She was born in Havana, Ciudad de la Habana. She was the first woman to represent Cuba at the Olympics.

== International competitions ==
Year	Competition	Venue	Position	Event	Notes
Representing Cuba
1954	Central American and Caribbean Games	Caracas, Venezuela	3rd	100 m	12.52
1954	Central American and Caribbean Games	Caracas, Venezuela	3rd	4 × 100 m relay	48.81
1955	Pan American Games	Mexico City, Mexico	1st	60 m	7.5
1955	Pan American Games	Mexico City, Mexico	2nd	80 m hurdles	11.8
1956	Olympic Games	Melbourne, Australia	9th (sf)	80 m hurdles	11.2
1959	Pan American Games	Chicago, United States	20th (h)	60 m	9.0
1959	Pan American Games	Chicago, United States	1st	80 m hurdles	11.2
1960	Olympic Games	Rome, Italy	23rd (h)	80 m hurdles	11.84
1962	Central American and Caribbean Games	Kingston, Jamaica	1st	80 m hurdles	11.1
1962	Central American and Caribbean Games	Kingston, Jamaica	1st	Long jump	5.50 m

== Personal bests ==
- 80 metres hurdles – 10.7h (1963)
