= Isabelle Daniels =

American sprinter (1937–2017)

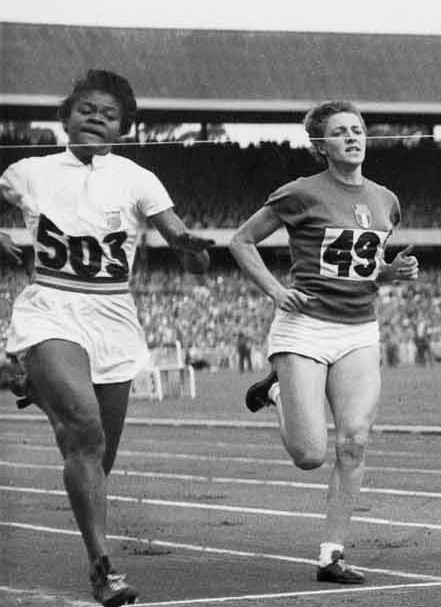
- Daniels (left) vs. Giuseppina Leone of Italy at the 1956 Olympics, in the close finish of the 100 meter final. Daniels placed fourth, and Leone fifth.

Personal information
- Full name: Isabelle Frances Daniels
- Nickname: Tweety
- Born: July 31, 1937 Jakin, Georgia, U.S.
- Died: September 8, 2017 (aged 80) Atlanta, Georgia
- Education: Tennessee State University
- Occupations: School Teacher, Track Coach
- Height: 166 cm (5 ft 5 in)
- Weight: 61 kg (134 lb)
- Spouse: Rev. Sidney R. Holston
- Children: 4

Sport
- Sport: Track, sprinter
- Events: 60, 100, 200 meters 4x100 meter relay
- College team: Tennessee State University (TSU)
- Club: TSU Tigers, Nashville
- Coached by: Ed S. Temple (Tennessee State)

Achievements and titles
- Personal bests: 100 m – 11.6 (1956); 200 – 23.6 (1959)
Medal record
Representing United States
Olympic Games
Bronze medal – third place	1956 Melbourne	4×100 m relay
Pan American Games
Gold medal – first place	1955 Mexico City	4×100 m relay
Silver medal – second place	1955 Mexico City	60 m
Gold medal – first place	1959 Chicago	4×100 m relay
Gold medal – first place	1959 Chicago	60 m
Silver medal – second place	1959 Chicago	200 m

Isabelle Frances Daniels (later Holston; July 31, 1937 – September 8, 2017) was an American sprinter who competed for Tennessee State University. On December 1, 1956, she won a bronze medal in the 4x100 meter relay at the 1956 Melbourne Olympics with a combined time in the finals of 44.9. With her 4x100 finish, she became part of the first All-African American women's relay team to compete in the Olympics, qualify for the finals with a time of 45.4, and then earn a medal. She was a world record holder in the 50-yard dash, and won a total of three golds and two silver medals at the 1955 and 1959 Pan American Games in the 60 meter, 200 meter and 4x100 meter relay events. After college graduation around 1958, she taught High School and coached basketball and track at Columbus, Georgia's Carver High School for two years, and then taught and coached for 35 years in Georgia's DeKalb County Schools including Gordon High School and Ronald E. McNair High School.

== Early life ==
Isabelle Daniels was born the youngest of nine children on July 31, 1937 in Jakin, Georgia to Fred and Vera Daniels. Her father Fred grew cotton, corn, and peanuts on his farm and drove a school bus on the side to make ends meet. Her mother worked as a schoolteacher, a profession Isabelle would later embrace. Isabelle attended the segregated George Washington Carver High School, of just over 100 students, several miles Northwest of Jakin in Early County, Georgia, graduating around 1954. At 16, to improve her conditioning for the Tuskegee Relays, she would run the 13 miles to school from her home, following the route of her father's school bus. In her Senior year in High School, she captured Georgia state championships in the 50-yard dash and the 100-yard dash. In the Spring of that year, she participated in the well-known Penn Relays, a meet usually attended only by elite athletes. Active at her school, she was a Cheerleader, and a star in both track and basketball.

== Tennessee State University ==
Daniels attended Tennessee State University on scholarship, primarily a work-study program, where she was part of their AAU champion relay team for 5 years. She took the silver in the 60 meters at the 1955 Pan American Games and was on the winning relay team. At Tennessee State, she was coached by Ed Temple, Head Coach of the Tennessee State Tigerbelles, who managed the team for 44 years. Temple first noticed her when she ran the Tuskegee Relays when she was sixteen. An exceptional coach, Temple had 40 of his runners at Tennessee State compete in the Olympics. During her collegiate years, in addition to the Melbourne Olympics, she competed in Athens, Warsaw, Budapest, Mexico City and Greece. Daniels and the Tigerbelle runners attended practice as often as three times a day, and practiced on a cinder track which had more resistance than modern synthetic tracks, but may have provided slightly less cushioning. Rain could result in a soggy surface, and a strong wind could sometimes blow away small parts of the surface.

=== 1956 Olympic trials ===
She began competing with the U.S. National team, only one year after graduating High School. In 1956, she qualified for the Olympics at the 1956 Track and Field trials in Washington D.C., winning the 100 meter dash. She had run the 100-yard dash in an American record time of 11.1 seconds, and set an indoor record for the 50-yard dash of 5.8 seconds.

== 1956 Melbourne Olympics ==
She competed for the United States in the 1956 Summer Olympics held in Melbourne, Australia, where she won the bronze medal on December 1 in the Women's 4×100 meter relay with her teammates Mae Faggs, Margaret Matthews and Wilma Rudolph, in a race where all three teams beat the existing world record. Daniels ran the fourth leg as anchor, and her U.S. team finished in a combined time of 44.9. Daniels made history competing with the first All African-American women's relay team. Wilma Rudolph, who perhaps became the best known of the 4x100 relay team, was the only team member who did not compete for Tennessee State at the time as she was still in High School, though she would later attend the school and run track. In the 4x100 meter finals, Australia, favored to win, took the gold with a combined time of 44.5 in a close finish, and did not pass the anchor runner for Britain, Heather Armitage until the last 50 meters. The team from Great Britain took the silver with a time of 44.7.

She was initially given a third place finish in the very close 100 meter event at the Melbourne Olympics with an automatic time of 11.98, but was moved to fourth after photos of the finish were examined. Daniels was only .04 seconds in automatic timing behind the third place bronze medalist, Marlene Matthews who finished in 11.94. Betty Cuthbert of Australia took the gold with an automatic time of 11.82, and Christa Stubnik of Germany took the silver with an automatic time of 11.2. Guiseppina Leone of Italy was given fifth place with a time of 12.07.

Returning from the Olympics, she was feted with a parade in Blakely, Georgia, near her hometown, and presented with a key to the city.

=== International highlights ===
In 1958 she won gold medals at the Goodwill Tour conducted in the Soviet Union, Poland, and Eastern Europe.

In international competition, she won a gold medal at the 1955 Pan American Games in Mexico City in the 4×100 m relay, and a silver in the 60 meter event. She won a gold medal at the 1959 Pan American Games at Soldier Field in Chicago in the 4x100 meter relay, a gold in the 4x100 meter relay, another gold in the 60 meter event, and a silver in the 200 meter event.

At her retirement from running in 1959, Daniels still retained the world record in the 50-yard dash.

=== Coaching and teaching ===
Immediately after graduating college around 1958-59, she began working as a physical education teacher initially coaching for Columbus, Georgia's Carver High for two years from around 1959-1961. She taught at Forrest Hills Elementary in greater Atlanta for three years from around 1961-1964. Beginning around 1964, she spent another three decades coaching at other schools in DeKalb County. She taught at Hamilton High for three years through around 1967, and taking off to raise her children, worked from around 1972-1987 for Gordon High School. At Gordon High, she led the team to 4 state girl's track championships, seven county, and 12 regional championships and led the basketball team to a subregion basketball title. Beginning around 1988, she taught and coached at Ronald E. McNair High School, formerly Walker High, which received the students from Gordon High. She coached both track and basketball. In recognition for her coaching achievements, she received numerous awards, including the 1990 National Coach of the Year by the National High School Athletic Coaches Association. In 1996, Daniels retired from coaching track at DeKalb County Georgia's Robert E. McNair High School in Atlanta.

=== Honors ===
She became a member of the Tennessee State University Hall of Fame in 1983. In 1987 she was inducted into the Georgia Sports Hall of Fame. As an accomplished coach, she was named the National Coach of the Year for Region III in 1990, 1983, and 1985 by the National High School Coaches Athletic Association (NHSCAA). In 1992 she was honored as the All-State Role Model; a documentary on her life was produced and broadcast in the halftime of the Georgia high school all-stars basketball game. She was also listed on a 1992 "Coaches Care Honor Roll" sponsored by Gatorade. In March 2006 she was inducted into the Hall of Fame of the Bob Hayes Invitational Track Meet in Jacksonville, Florida.

In recognition of her former Olympic achievements, Isabelle carried the torch prior to the Centennial Olympic Games in Atlanta in 1996 along with her Olympic team mates. In January 2022, she was post-humously inducted into the Georgia Track and Field Hall of Fame for Coaches.

=== Marriage ===
At 24, she married Reverend Sidney R. Holston on October 8, 1960. Holston had worked as a teacher and in insurance prior to becoming a reverend They first met in the fall of 1959 while she was working as a teacher and coach in Columbus, Georgia. The couple had four children with her first child born around 1962.

Beginning in 1996 through 2015, Daniels stayed active in the Senior Olympics at both the National and State level, competing primarily in the discus, shot put and long jump, occasionally winning age-group medals. In her retirement, she belonged to the Decatur and Dekalb Retired Educators Association and the Georgias Association for Retired Educators. She noticed a shortness of breath in 2015, and Doctors located a blood clot in July, 2016. She died on September 8, 2017 at her home in Decatur, Alabama, in greater Atlanta, Georgia, at the age of 80. Her funeral was held on September 18 at St. Phillip African Methodist Episcopal (AME) in Atlanta. She was buried at Canton, Georgia's Georgia National Cemetery, and was survived by two sons, two daughters and eight grandchildren.
