= 1928 United States Olympic trials (track and field) =

- Dates: July 3–July 7
- Host city: Cambridge, Massachusetts (men); Philadelphia, Pennsylvania (men, 3 events); Newark, New Jersey (women)
- Venue: Harvard Stadium (men)
- Level: Senior
- Type: Outdoor

The 1928 United States Olympic trials for track and field were held between July 3 and July 7, 1928 and decided the United States team for the 1928 Summer Olympics in Amsterdam. For the first time, women's track and field was part of the Olympic program. The trials for men and women were held separately; men competed at Harvard Stadium in Cambridge, Massachusetts on July 6 and July 7, while women competed at City Field in Newark, New Jersey on July 4. Three of the men's events were contested in Philadelphia, Pennsylvania between July 3 and July 5.

Both the men's and women's Olympic trials also served as the annual United States outdoor track and field championships. For the last time, the top four athletes in each event qualified for the Olympics; starting in 1932, every nation was limited to three entrants per event.

Official world records were set in the men's meet by Morgan Taylor in the 400 m hurdles and by Ed Hamm in the long jump.

== Qualifying ==
Athletes qualified for the men's Olympic trials by competing in preliminary tryouts. There were 14 preliminary meetings in total, including regional tryouts and major collegiate meets (the NCAA championship and the IC4A championship both served as tryouts). So many athletes qualified for the final Olympic trials that three or more rounds were needed in all sprinting and hurdling events; for the next Olympic trials in 1932 a more restrictive qualifying system was adopted. Athletes who finished in the top four in their events at the final trials qualified for the Olympic team, with some exceptions. The marathon was not part of the main Olympic trials, and a different qualifying system based on multiple races was used for that event.

== Men ==
The men's Olympic trials were contested at Harvard Stadium in Cambridge, Massachusetts on July 6 and July 7, except for three events (400 meters, 400 meter hurdles and decathlon) which were scheduled to be held at the Philadelphia Municipal Stadium in Philadelphia, Pennsylvania on July 3 and July 4. Due to poor weather conditions, the decathlon was interrupted on July 4 and continued on July 5 at Franklin Field, also in Philadelphia.

The meeting doubled as the annual AAU outdoor national championship; all defending champions from 1927 returned to defend their titles, with the exception of Ville Ritola who was Finnish. Two official world records were set at the men's trials, by Morgan Taylor in the 400 m hurdles and by Ed Hamm in the long jump; additionally, Lloyd Hahn broke the world record in the 800 m and both Ross Nichols and Steve Anderson equaled the world record in the 110 m hurdles, but their marks were not officially ratified.

=== Philadelphia ===
Event	First		Second		Third		Fourth	
400 m	Ray Barbuti	51.6 (Note: All official times at the 1928 Olympic trials were hand-times, taken with the accuracy of one-fifth of a second; for example, Ray Barbuti's winning time in the 400-meter final was 51 3/5 seconds.)	Euil Snider		Hermon Phillips		Joe Tierney	
400 m hurdles	Morgan Taylor	52.0 WR	Frank Cuhel	52.1e	Johnny Gibson	52.5e	Robert Maxwell	52.6e
Decathlon	Ken Doherty	7600	Jim Stewart	7533	Barney Berlinger	7362	Tom Churchill	7203

The 400 meters final was run in a storm, accounting for the very slow winning time of 51.6 seconds; both Barbuti and Snider had won their semi-finals in 48.0. Emerson "Bud" Spencer, the one-eyed Stanford University runner who had set the world record (47.0) two months earlier, was surprisingly eliminated as he only placed fifth; Spencer and the sixth finalist, Fred Alderman, were named to the Olympic 4 × 400 meter relay team. The other two Olympic relay runners were decided by an extra race for those eliminated in the semi-finals, won by George Baird ahead of John Lewis; however, Lewis was replaced with Barbuti after the latter won an Olympic gold in the individual event.

The 400 meter hurdles final was run before the storm arrived; Morgan Taylor, the 1924 Olympic champion, set a new world record (52.0) but still only narrowly defeated Cuhel. Defending AAU champion Gibson, who held the world record in the 440 yard hurdles (52.6), placed third. The old, still listed world record for the metric hurdles (53.8 by Sten Pettersson) was broken in the heats, in the semi-finals, and by all seven men in the final.

In the decathlon the 1928 Penn Relays were originally advertised as an Olympic qualifying event; Tony Plansky, the 1924 AAU champion, won the Penn Relays decathlon ahead of Doherty and Churchill with 7142 points. In the end, though, decathlon selections were based solely on the Philadelphia meet; Plansky was unprepared for having to qualify a second time and only placed 11th. Defending AAU champion Fait Elkins, who entered the trials as a clear favorite, was also left out of the Olympic team; he injured himself in the first event (100 meters) and had to withdraw. An appeal by Elkins to be selected in spite of his injury was not upheld; he performed poorly in a test two weeks after the trials, and the selectors felt he had not recovered sufficiently.

The rain and wind that disturbed the 400 meters final interrupted the decathlon's eighth event, the pole vault; the last three events were moved to Franklin Field and contested the following day, with the pole vault restarted from scratch. Doherty, the Penn Relays runner-up, eventually won from Stewart and Berlinger; he went on to win bronze at the Olympics. Churchill received the fourth spot on the Olympic team after Elkins's appeal was rejected.

=== Cambridge ===
==== Track ====
Event	First		Second		Third		Fourth	
100 m	Frank Wykoff	10.6	Robert McAllister	10.7e	Henry Russell	10.7e	Claude Bracey	10.7e
200 m straight	Charles Borah	21.4	Charley Paddock	21.5e	Jackson Scholz	21.5e	Henry Cumming	21.7e
800 m	Lloyd Hahn	1:51.4 WR	Earl Fuller	1:51.9e	Ray Watson	1:52.3e	John Sittig	1:53.4e
1500 m	Ray Conger	3:55.0 AR	Sid Robinson	3:55.6e	Nick Carter	3:55.8e	Orval Martin	3:55.9e
5000 m	Leo Lermond	14:52.8	Macauley Smith	14:56e	David Abbott	14:56e	Charles Haworth	15:03e
10,000 m	Joie Ray	31:28.4 AR	John Romig	120 yds bh	Verne Booth	10 yds bh2	Johnny Zola	90 yds bh3
3000 m SC	William Spencer	9:35.8	Jesse Montgomery	10 yds bh	Melvin Dalton		Walter Gegan	
110 m hurdles	Steve Anderson	14.8 =WR	John Collier	14.8e	Leighton Dye	14.9e	Carl Ring	15.0e

In the 100 meters four rounds – heats, quarterfinals, semi-finals and the final – were run in the space of one afternoon. Frank Wykoff, an 18-year-old high schooler, outlasted his opponents, winning all four of his races in 10.6. Defending AAU champion Charley Borah retained his title in the 200 meters; Paddock and Scholz, who placed behind him, had both been among the world's top sprinters for almost a decade and qualified for their third Olympic Games. Roland Locke, who held the world record for 220 yards (20.6), lost the fourth Olympic spot to Cumming by inches. The Americans entered the Olympic short sprints with high hopes, but did not win any medals in either the 100 meters or the 200 meters; in the 4 × 100 meter relay, the American team (Wykoff, Borah, Russell and Jimmy Quinn) won gold in 41.0.

1924 Olympian Lloyd Hahn, who had won the 1928 AAU indoor title in a world best 1:51.4 (880 yards), reached the same time outdoors in the 800-meter final; his time was an outdoor world record, breaking Otto Peltzer's previous mark of 1:51.6, but was never officially ratified. (Note: Otto Peltzer's world record of 1:51.6 had been set at 880 yards (804.672 meters), and was the official outdoor world record for both the metric and imperial half-miles; it was equivalent to 1:50.8–1:51.0 for the metric distance. Hahn continued to 880 yards in the trials final in an attempt to break Peltzer's imperial mark, but his time at that point was only 1:52.4. Hahn's metric world record was superseded before the Olympics when France's Séra Martin ran 800 meters in 1:50.6.) In the 1500 meters, defending champion Ray Conger finished fast to set an American record of 3:55.0, with Robinson and Carter following; Orval Martin, who had been in the lead for much of the way, stumbled at the very end and dropped to fourth place. As Hahn was named to the team in this event as well, Martin missed out on an Olympic spot. In the long-distance races the American teams, while not world-beaters, were stronger timewise than the 1924 squad; Joie Ray, also entered in the marathon, set an American record in winning the 10,000 meters.

There were two high-profile falls in the 110 m hurdles. Hugo "Swede" Leistner, winner of the Pacific Tryouts, fell while leading his heat; Ross Nichols, who led the semi-finals with 14.8, fell while leading the final. Nichols hit the ninth hurdle and lost his balance; as a result, he crashed into the tenth hurdle, losing his chances of making the team. There was controversy as to whether the ninth hurdle had been misplaced, causing Nichols to trip; a meeting official stated the hurdle had been correctly positioned, and was only knocked out of position when Nichols hit it, but Nichols's supporters did not accept this explanation. Steve Anderson won, equaling Nichols's semi-final time of 14.8; both times also equaled the official world record, but were never ratified. (Note: While the de jure world record for the 110 m hurdles was 14.8, Earl Thomson's world record for the only marginally shorter 120 yd hurdles was 14.4, and Leighton Dye had run the metric distance in 14.6 three weeks before the trials. Like Dye's time, the marks of Nichols and Anderson were not ratified as official world records.)

==== Field ====
Event	First		Second		Third		Fourth	
High jump	Bob King	6 ft 5 in (1.96 m)	Charles McGinnis	6 ft 5 in (1.96 m)	Harold Osborn	6 ft 4 in (1.93 m)	Ben Hedges	6 ft 3 in (1.90 m)
Pole vault	Lee Barnes	13 ft 9 in (4.19 m)	Bill Droegemueller	13 ft 9 in (4.19 m)	Sabin Carr	13 ft 9 in (4.19 m)	Charles McGinnis	13 ft 6 in (4.11 m)
Long jump	Ed Hamm	25 ft 11 1/8 in (7.90 m) WR	Al Bates	24 ft 2 1/2 in (7.38 m)	DeHart Hubbard	23 ft 11 1/2 in (7.30 m)	Ed Gordon	23 ft 6 3/8 in (7.17 m)
Triple jump	Levi Casey	48 ft 10 1/8 in (14.89 m)	Sidney Bowman	48 ft 4 7/8 in (14.76 m)	Bob Kelley	47 ft 10 3/4 in (14.60 m)	Lloyd Bourgeois	47 ft 5 5/8 in (14.47 m)
Shot put	Herman Brix	50 ft 11 3/4 in (15.54 m)	Harlow Rothert	49 ft 8 1/4 in (15.14 m)	John Kuck	49 ft 4 3/4 in (15.05 m)	Eric Krenz	49 ft 2 3/4 in (15.00 m)
Discus throw	Bud Houser	153 ft 6 1/4 in (46.79 m)	Fred Wiecker	150 ft 3 3/4 in (45.81 m)	James Corson	147 ft 10 3/4 in (45.08 m)	John Anderson	145 ft 7 in (44.40 m)
Hammer throw	Ed Black	166 ft 4 1/4 in (50.70 m)	Ken Caskey	162 ft 9 3/4 in (49.62 m)	Donald Gwinn	161 ft 3 7/8 in (49.17 m)	Frank Conner	159 ft 6 7/8 in (48.63 m)
Javelin throw	Creth Hines	202 ft 1 3/4 in (61.60 m)	Charles Harlow	201 ft 3 7/8 in (61.35 m)	Arthur Sager	200 ft 3 in (61.04 m)	Lee Bartlett	198 ft 10 3/4 in (60.62 m)

In the high jump Bob King, who was both the defending AAU champion and the 1928 NCAA champion, defeated McGinnis in a jump-off to retain his AAU title; Osborn, who was the reigning Olympic champion and held the world record of 6 ft 8 1/4 in (2.03 m), placed third. King went on to win gold at the Olympics, with Hedges taking the silver.

McGinnis also qualified in the pole vault – a double that has never been repeated since – after defeating Jack Williams in a jump-off for the final Olympic spot. Reigning Olympic champion Barnes won from Droegemueller and Carr in a competition with a deep high-quality field; the United States was the world's leading pole vault power. Carr, Droegemueller and McGinnis swept the medals in Amsterdam.

NCAA champion Ed Hamm dominated the long jump, improving Hubbard's world record of 25 ft 10 7/8 in (7.89 m) by a fraction of an inch. In a rarity, three individual Olympic champions qualified for the American team in the same event; Hubbard had won Olympic gold in 1924, Hamm won in Amsterdam, and Gordon went on to win in 1932. In the triple jump Levi Casey won his third consecutive AAU title; he took silver in Amsterdam, the last American to medal in the triple jump until 1976.

In the shot put Herman Brix was the in-form man at the Olympic trials; defending AAU champion Kuck had unofficially broken the shot put world record earlier in 1928, but at the trials he only placed third. At the Olympics Kuck set an official world record, winning gold ahead of Brix. Bud Houser, the reigning Olympic champion in both the shot and the discus, concentrated on the latter event in 1928; he won at the trials and successfully defended his Olympic title in Amsterdam, with Corson taking the bronze. The failure of defending AAU champion Eric Krenz to qualify in the discus was a surprise; he made the Olympic team in the shot, but the discus was considered his better event. Some consideration was given by team selectors to adding Krenz in the discus team or moving Anderson to the shot with Krenz in the discus, but these ideas were rejected.

The hammer throw was one of the events in which the American team was not as strong as at the 1924 Games. Ed "Rip" Black, the eventual trials winner and Olympic bronze medalist, was only fifth after the qualifying rounds and the last man to make the final; in the final he improved by almost eight feet and won. Matt McGrath, the 1912 Olympic champion, nearly qualified for his fifth consecutive Olympics; he missed fourth place by less than a foot. In the javelin the top Americans were evenly matched; IC4A champion Hines also won at the trials, with defending AAU champion Harlow the runner-up ahead of Sager and Bartlett. None of the four made an impact in Amsterdam.

=== Marathon ===
Event	First		Second		Third	
Boston Marathon; Boston, Massachusetts; April 19	Clarence DeMar	2:37:07.8	James Henigan	2:41:01	Joie Ray	2:41:56.8
Long Beach Marathon; New York City; May 19	Joie Ray	2:34:13.4	Albert Michelsen	2:35:23		
Baltimore Marathon; Baltimore, Maryland; June 2	William Agee	2:57:04.4	Harvey Frick	3:00:11.4		

In the marathon there was no clear qualifying system. Six entrants per country were allowed, and eight races had been named as Olympic tryouts; in the end, the top two from each of the three races with the highest quality were selected. Joie Ray, who also qualified in the 10,000 meters, was considered America's best Olympic hope in both events; in the Olympic marathon he was among the leaders for much of the way, but eventually dropped to fifth.

The 1928 Boston Marathon also served as the USA Marathon Championships for that year.

=== Other AAU championship events ===
Event	First		Second	Third
220 yd low hurdles	Frank Cuhel	23.6		
3 mile walk	Harry Hinkel	21:49.2		
56 pound weight throw	Pat McDonald	33 ft 10 1/4 in (10.31 m)		

These events were not part of the Olympic trials, but were contested at Harvard Stadium as part of the AAU national championships. Between 1911 and 1933 McDonald won the AAU weight throw championship ten times; Matt McGrath, who placed second, was a seven-time champion.

== Women ==
With the inclusion of women's track and field in the Olympic program, women competed at the Olympic trials for the first time in 1928. The women's trials were held at City Field in Newark, New Jersey on July 4, 1928. Like the men's meet, the women's trials also doubled as the national outdoor championships. Elta Cartwright of the Northern California Athletic Club was the leading star of the meet, winning the 50 yards, the 100 meters and the long jump; meeting rules prevented her from entering more events. National records were set by Maybelle Reichardt in the discus throw and Rayma Wilson in the 800 meters; in the shot put, Lillian Copeland equaled her own national record.

Of the twelve events in the AAU championship program, only four were part of the Olympic trials. The team championship was won by the Northern California Athletic Club with 52 points; Pasadena Athletic Club placed second.

=== Trials ===
Event	First		Second		Third		Fourth	
100 m	Elta Cartwright	12.4	Betty Robinson	12.5e	Anne Vrana		Mary Washburn	
800 m	Rayma Wilson	2:32.6 NR	Dee Boeckmann	2:33.8	Florence MacDonald	2:36.0	Ruth Martin	
High jump	Mildred Wiley	4 ft 11 3/4 in (1.52 m)	Jean Shiley	4 ft 11 3/4 in (1.52 m)	Catherine Maguire	4 ft 10 3/4 in (1.49 m)	Marion Holley	4 ft 10 3/4 in (1.49 m)
Discus throw	Maybelle Reichardt	116 ft 9 1/4 in (35.58 m) AR	Lillian Copeland	115 ft 1 1/2 in (35.09 m)	Margaret Jenkins	107 ft 6 in (32.77 m)	Rena MacDonald	102 ft 5 1/4 in (31.22 m)

The 100-meter dash was Cartwright's only trials event; she won from 16-year-old Betty Robinson, the eventual Olympic champion. Future star Stella Walsh was narrowly eliminated in the semi-finals. The 800 meters was run as a time trial with several heats; both Boeckmann in heat one and Wilson in heat three broke the previous national record. Women's middle-distance races were a rarity in the United States, and the three Americans selected were not expected to make any impact in Amsterdam; MacDonald's sixth place in the Olympic final (2:22.6e) was a surprise. The high jump title was decided in a jump-off; Wiley, who went on to win bronze in Amsterdam, defeated newcomer Shiley by clearing 4 ft 11 3/4 in (1.52 m) a second time. Reichardt, the discus champion, had not competed since 1926 but made a comeback for the Olympics; the American record in this event was relatively easy to break, as in previous years American meets had used a heavier imperial discus.

=== Other AAU championship events ===
Event	First		Second		Third
50 yards	Elta Cartwright	6.6	Maybelle Gilliland		Ruth Waldner
Long jump	Elta Cartwright	16 ft 10 3/4 in (5.15 m)	Elizabeth Grobes	5.00 m	Dorothy Furth
200 meters	Florence Wright	27.4	Alice Williams		Martha Scarlett
8 lb shot put	Lillian Copeland	40 ft 4 1/4 in (12.30 m) =AR	Rena McDonald	11.44 m	Aida Silva
4 × 110 yards relay	Northern California AC	52.2			
Javelin throw	Margaret Jenkins	112 ft 5 5/8 in (34.28 m)	Gloria Russell	29.75 m	Estelle Hill
80 yards hurdles	Helen Filkey	8.4	Belle Owens		Aida Silva
Baseball throw	Vivian Hartwick	228 ft 8 1/2 in (69.71 m)			

Cartwright won two more national titles in the 50-yard dash and the long jump; she might have scored even more points, but meeting rules limited her to only three events. Northern California Athletic Club won the 4 × 110 yard relay without Cartwright, and also scored first places in the javelin and baseball throws; in the baseball throw the top three (Hartwick, Jenkins and Gloria Russell) were all Northern California athletes. Lillian Copeland of Pasadena Athletic Club, who won silver in the discus in Amsterdam, equaled her own American record for the eight-pound (3.63 kg) shot.

== Selections and appeals ==
The principle that the top four finishers in each event would be selected for the Olympics was not followed completely strictly. Lloyd Hahn, who only took part in the 800 meters at the trials, was selected for the Olympics in both that event and the 1500 meters; Orval Martin, who had placed fourth in the 1500 meters, was left out of the Olympic team. Although Hahn was seen as a potential Olympic champion in both the 800 and 1500 meters, the move was still criticized, and failed to pay off as he underperformed in Amsterdam; Avery Brundage, then president of the American Olympic Association, cited the Hahn case as a reason not to give star athletes any special treatment at the next Olympic trials. In the 10,000 meters Verne Booth and Johnny Zola, who placed third and fourth at the trials, were left out of the team as too weak; Zola traveled to Amsterdam at his own expense, hoping the selectors would change their mind. American officials did eventually enter him, but the deadline for entries had already passed, and he was not allowed to compete. In the end, the American team in the 10,000 meters consisted of the trials top two (Joie Ray and John Romig) and 5000-meter runner Macauley Smith, with no fourth entrant.

A number of athletes who had placed outside the top four at the trials and not been selected also attempted to appeal their non-selection. The New York Athletic Club sponsored the trips of decathlete Fait Elkins, sprinter Roland Locke, hurdler Weems Baskin and hammer thrower Matt McGrath to Europe. The appeal of Elkins, who was America's best decathlete but had injured himself at the trials, was taken seriously; it was only rejected after a test of form in mid-July indicated he had not recovered from his injury. Locke, who held the 220 yards world record, would have qualified in the 200 meters if Charley Paddock had not been cleared of accusations of professionalism; at the time, only amateur athletes were allowed to compete in the Olympics. Paddock's amateur status was challenged after the trials, and two committees voted to exclude him from the team, but he was reinstated before the final selections were made.

Hurdler Ross Nichols appealed on the grounds that he had hit a misplaced hurdle in the final; his appeal was turned down as meeting officials denied the hurdle had been misplaced, and footage of the race failed to support Nichols. Sprinter Frank Hussey and hurdlers Hugo Leistner and Clyde Blanchard travelled to Amsterdam as stowaways aboard the U.S. team's ship, the SS President Roosevelt; like the other rejected athletes, they were not allowed to run at the Olympics but could take part in other European meets.
