= 1926 USA Outdoor Track and Field Championships =

American athletics championship event

- Dates: 2 July (men); 9–10 July (women)
- Host city: Philadelphia, Pennsylvania
- Venue: Municipal Stadium
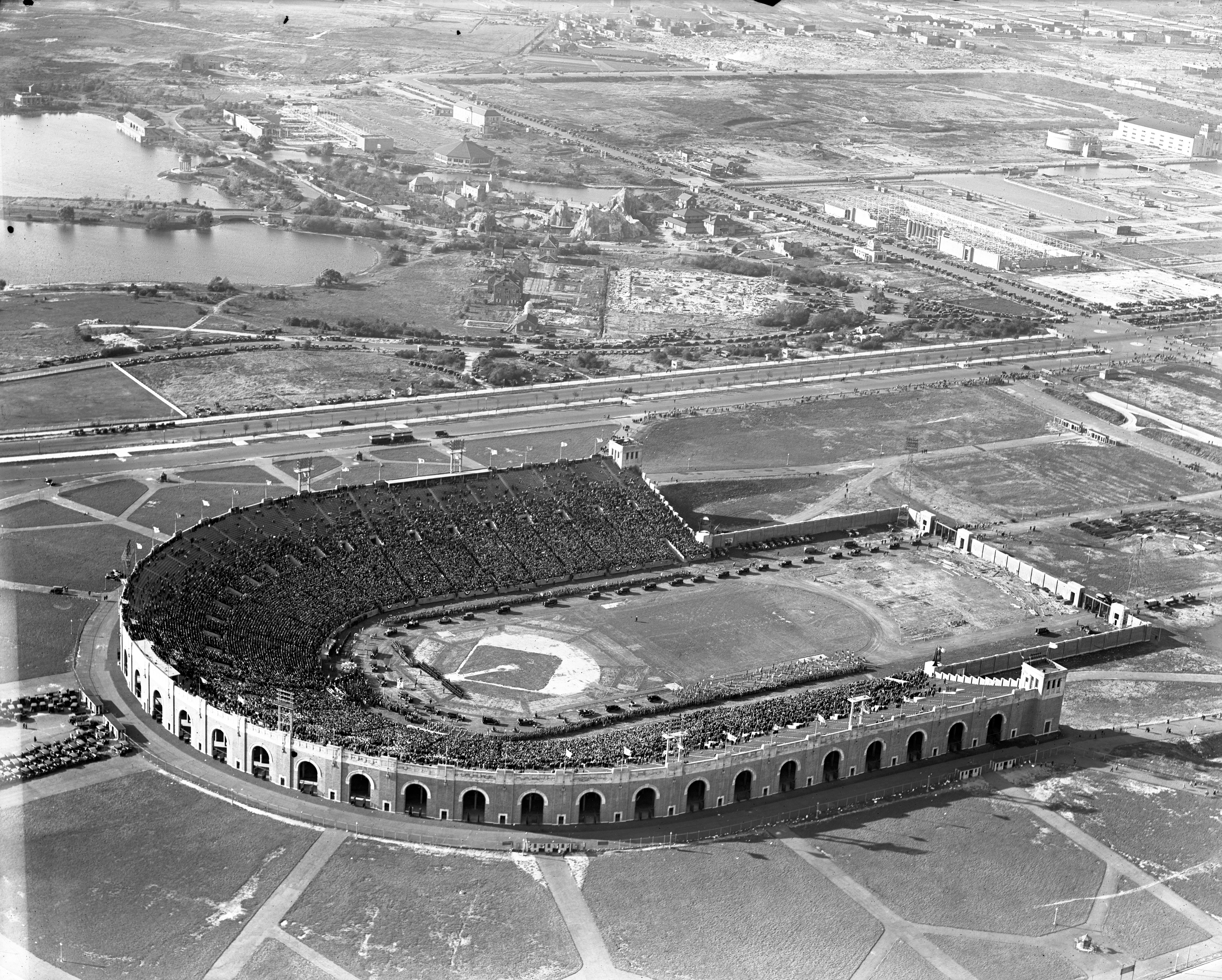

The 1926 USA Outdoor Track and Field Championships were organized by the Amateur Athletic Union (AAU) and served as the national championships in outdoor track and field for the United States.

The men's edition was held at Municipal Stadium in Philadelphia, Pennsylvania, and it took place 2 July. The women's meet was held separately at the same venue on 9–10 July.

At the men's championships, an American record was set in the 3 miles walk. It was the first time that relays counted towards the team championships. In the women's competition, Lillian Copeland won the shot put, discus, and javelin.

== Results ==
=== Men ===
Event	Gold		Silver		Bronze	
100 yards	Charles Borah	9.8	Jackson Scholz	2 yards behind	William DeHart Hubbard	2 yards behind 2nd
220 yards straight	Tom Sharkey	21.4	Charles Borah		Jackson Scholz	
440 yards	Kenneth Kennedy	48.6	Horatio Fitch		George Oestrich	
880 yards	Alvah Martin	1:53.6	Walter Caine		Ray Watson	
1 mile	Lloyd Hahn	4:16.0	William Goodwin		Ray Conger	
6 miles	Phillip Osif	31:31.0	Verne Booth		Ove Andersen (FIN)	
Marathon	Clarence DeMar	2:45:05.2	Albert Michelson	2:53:00.0	William Agee	2:58:15.6
120 yards hurdles	Leighton Dye	14.6	Charles Werner		Hugo Leistner	
440 yards hurdles	F. Morgan Taylor	55.0	John Gibson		George Meyers	
2 miles steeplechase	Ville Ritola	10:34.2	Russell Payne	50 yards behind	Ove Andersen (FIN)	
High jump	Harold Osborn	1.94 m	Gail Robinson	1.92 m	Robert Juday	1.89 m
Pole vault	Paul Harrington	3.96 m	Edwin Myers	3.96 m	Lee Barnes	3.81 m
Long jump	William DeHart Hubbard	7.68 m	Paul Jones	7.38 m	Clifton Reynolds	7.18 m
Triple jump	Levi Casey	15.04 m	Earl Wilson	14.46 m	Homer Martin	14.09 m
Shot put	Herbert Schwarze	15.21 m	John Kuck	14.92 m	Clarence Houser	14.57 m
Discus throw	Clarence Houser	46.80 m	Wellington Charles	43.41 m	Arthur Baker	42.13 m
Hammer throw	Matthew McGrath	49.64 m	James McEachern	47.74 m	Donald Gwinn	47.71 m
Javelin throw	John Kuck	60.83 m	Creth Hines	60.75 m	Charles Harlow	58.38 m
Decathlon	Harold Osborn	7187.832 pts	Harry Frieda	6820.346 pts	Clifford Hoffman	6348.4625 pts
220 yards hurdles	Kenneth Grumbles	24.0				
Pentathlon	Theodore Drews	10 pts				
Weight throw for distance	Patrick McDonald	11.14 m				

=== Women ===
Event	Gold		Silver	Bronze
50 yards	Elta Cartwright	6.1	Betty Siska	Mary Weime
100 yards	Rosa Grosse (CAN)	11.8	Helen Filkey	Eleanor Egg
200 m	Frances Keddie	28.6	Ellen Brough	Ethel Nichols
80 yards hurdles	Helen Filkey	8.7	Hazel Kirk	Nellie Todd
High jump	Catherine Maguire	1.50 m	Elizabeth Stine	Ruth Brinton
Long jump	Nellie Todd	5.07 m	Helen Filkey	Elta Cartwright
Shot put (8 lb)	Lillian Copeland	11.68 m	Rena McDonald	Aurelia Brown
Discus throw	Lillian Copeland	30.81 m	Maybelle Reichardt	Dee Boeckman
Javelin throw	Lillian Copeland	34.28 m	Pauline Hascup	Alice Ryden
Baseball throw	Mabel Holmes	212 ft 9 in (64.84 m)		

== See also ==
- 1926 USA Indoor Track and Field Championships
- List of USA Outdoor Track and Field Championships winners (men)
- List of USA Outdoor Track and Field Championships winners (women)
