= 1925 USA Outdoor Track and Field Championships =

American athletics championship event

- Dates: 4–5 July (men); 11 July (women)
- Host city: San Francisco, California (men); Pasadena, California (women)
- Venue: Kezar Stadium (men); Paddock Field (women)
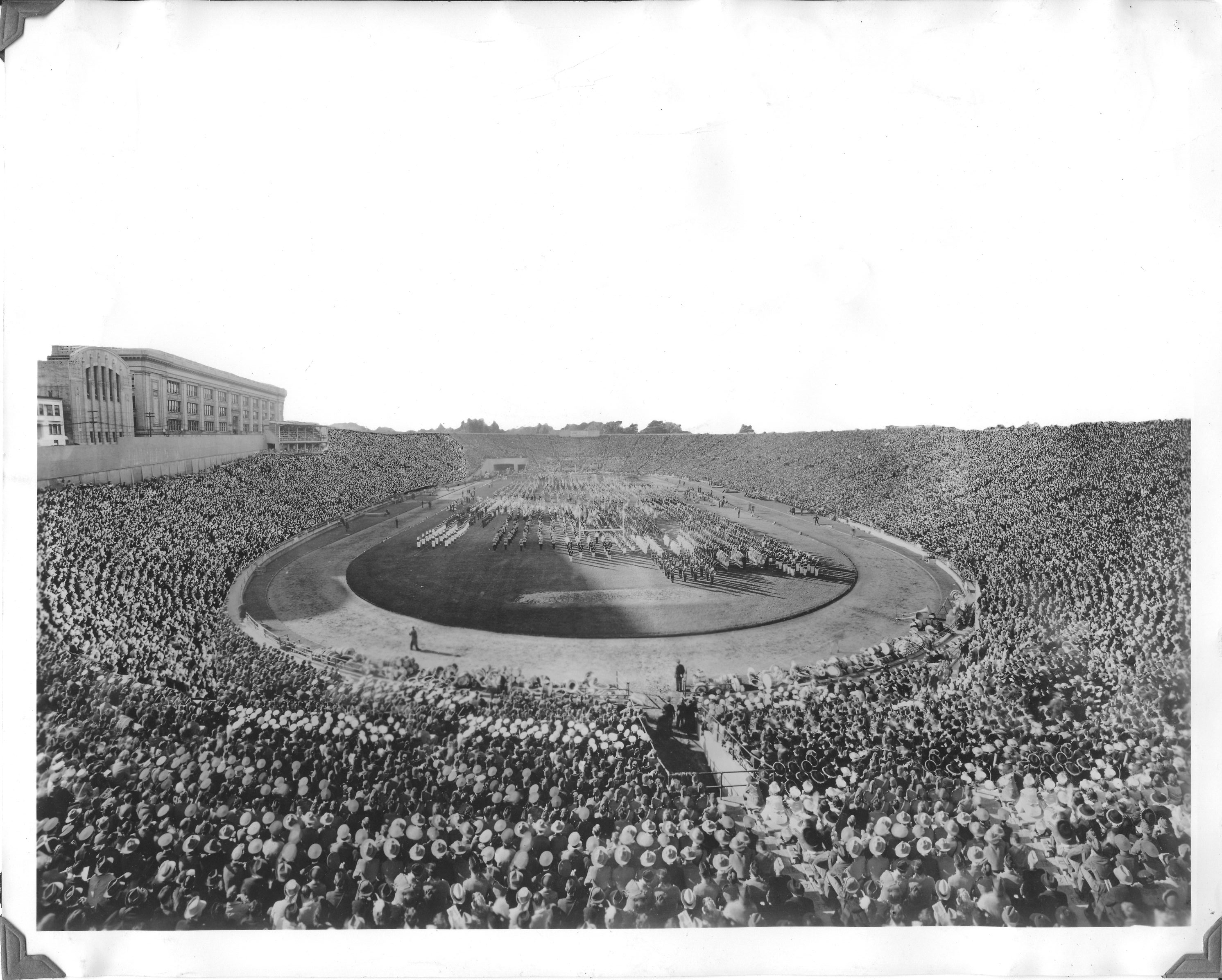

The 1925 USA Outdoor Track and Field Championships were organized by the Amateur Athletic Union (AAU) and served as the national championships in outdoor track and field for the United States.

The men's edition was held at Kezar Stadium in San Francisco, California, and it took place 4–5 July. The women's meet was held separately at Paddock Field in Pasadena, California, on 11 July.

At the men's championships, Henry Bonura threw the javelin 65.19 metres (213.9 ft), better than the then-American record, but the mark was not accepted as a record due to wind assistance. The main meet was held on 4 July and relays were held on 5 July. In the women's competition, Helen Filkey became the first woman to win multiple events at a single championships.

== Results ==
=== Men ===
Event	Gold		Silver		Bronze	
100 yards	Frank Hussey	9.8	Jackson Scholz	2 ft behind	William DeHart Hubbard	1 ft behind 2nd
220 yards straight	Jackson Scholz	20.8 w	Oliver MacDonald		Alfred Leconey	
440 yards	Cecil Cooke	49.2	Ray Robertson		none awarded	
440 yards	Cecil Cooke	49.2	Joe Tierney		none awarded	
880 yards	Alan Helffrich	1:56.6	James T. Holden	inches behind	George Marsters	
1 mile	Ray Buker	4:19.4	Lloyd Hahn		James Connolly	
6 miles	George Lermond	31:34.6	Ville Kyrönen (FIN)		John Gray	
Marathon	Charles Mellor	2:33:00.6	Clarence DeMar	2:33:37.0	Frank Zuna	2:35:03.0
120 yards hurdles	George Guthrie	14.6	Hugo Leistner	inches behind	Leighton Dye	
440 yards hurdles	F. Morgan Taylor	53.8	John Gibson		Richard Pomeroy	
2 miles steeplechase	Russell Payne	10:40.8	John O'Neill	10 yards behind	Basil Irwin	
High jump	Harold Osborn	2.00 m	Justin Russell	1.98 m	Robert Juday	
Pole vault	Harry Smith	3.95 m	Lee Barnes		Earl McKeown	
Long jump	William DeHart Hubbard	7.73 m	Paul Jones		Paul Courtois	
Triple jump	Homer Martin	14.61 m	Louis Minsky		Paul Courtois	
Shot put	Clarence Houser	15.26 m	Glenn Hartranft		John Kuck	
Discus throw	Clarence Houser	47.70 m	Augustus Pope		Arthur Hoffman	
Hammer throw	Matthew McGrath	52.44 m	James McEachern		Raymond Bunker	
Javelin throw	Henry Bonura	65.19 m	John Kuck		John Leyden	
Decathlon	Harold Osborn	7706.36 pts	Otto Anderson	6492.58 pts	Paul Jones	6445.89 pts
220 yards hurdles	Charles Brookins	23.4				
Pentathlon	Paul Courtois	11 pts				
Weight throw for distance	Matt McGrath	11.19 m				

=== Women ===
Event	Gold		Silver	Bronze
50 yards	Elta Cartwright	6.1	Maybelle Gilliland	Eleanor Egg
100 yards	Helen Filkey	11.4	Elta Cartwright	Frances Ruppert
80 yards hurdles	Helen Filkey	8.3	Hazel Kirk	Alta Huber
High jump	Elizabeth Stine	1.47 m	Marci Howard	Eleanor Egg
Long jump	Helen Filkey	5.18 m	Elvira Peterson	Lois Reed
Long jump	Helen Filkey	5.18 m	Elvira Peterson	Elizabeth Stine
Shot put (8 lb)	Lillian Copeland	10.02 m	Maybelle Reichardt	Rena Acquistapace
Discus throw	Maybelle Reichardt	26.59 m	Aurelia Brown	Lillian Copeland
Javelin throw	Alda Silva	32.21 m	Estelle Moloss	Margaret Proctor
Baseball throw	Ann Harrington	132 ft 0 in (40.23 m)	Lillian Copeland	

== See also ==
- 1925 USA Indoor Track and Field Championships
- List of USA Outdoor Track and Field Championships winners (men)
- List of USA Outdoor Track and Field Championships winners (women)
