= 1927 USA Outdoor Track and Field Championships =

American athletics championship event

- Dates: 2–4 July (men); 3 September (women)
- Host city: Lincoln, Nebraska (men); Eureka, California (women)
- Venue: Memorial Stadium (men); Allbee Stadium (women)
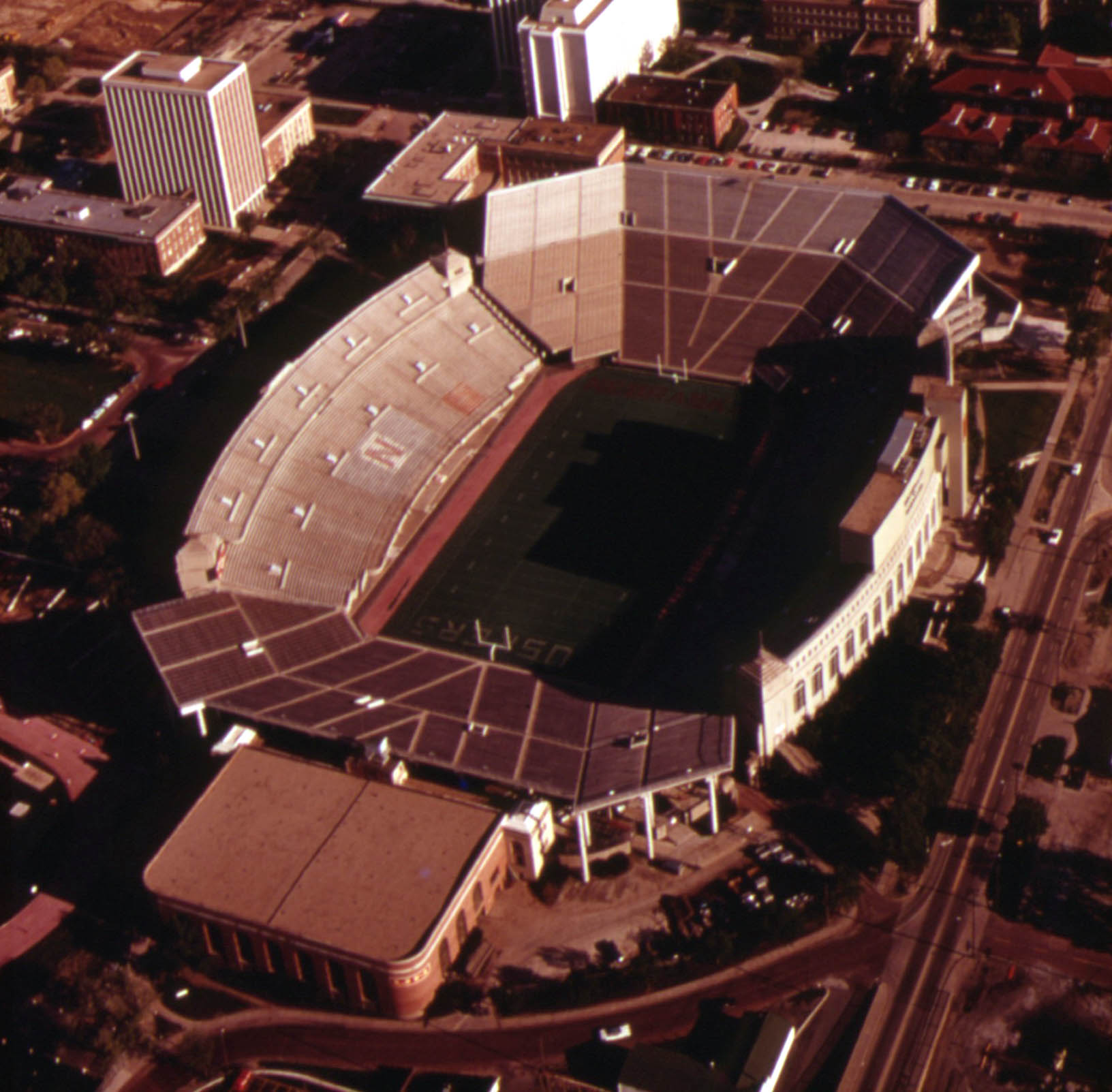

The 1927 USA Outdoor Track and Field Championships were organized by the Amateur Athletic Union (AAU) and served as the national championships in outdoor track and field for the United States.

The men's edition was held at Memorial Stadium in Lincoln, Nebraska, and it took place 2–4 July. The women's meet was held separately at Allbee Stadium in Eureka, California, on 3 September.

At the men's championships, world records were set in both heats of the 4 × 110 yards relay. A medley shot put and weight throw for height event were also held. The medley shot put consisted of throwing 8 lb, 12 lb, and 16 lb shots and adding the places in each competition, with the lowest score winning. In the women's competition, six American records were set.

== Results ==
=== Men ===
Event	Gold		Silver		Bronze	
100 yards	Chester Bowman	9.6	Charles Borah	inches behind	Roland Locke	inches behind 2nd
220 yards straight (Note: Race was held on a slight turn)	Charles Borah	21.6	Roland Locke	3 yards behind	Tom Sharkey	1 yard behind 2nd
440 yards	Hermon Phillips	49.6	Ed Haynes		George Stevenson	
880 yards	Ray Watson	1:53.6	Philip Edwards		Ray Dodge	
1 mile	Ray Conger	4:23.6	Joseph Spivak		Ernest Carter	
6 miles	Ville Ritola (FIN)	30:43.4	Russell Payne		William Meyer	
Marathon	Clarence DeMar	2:40:22.2	Yrjö Korholin-Koski (FIN)	2:44:41.0	William Kennedy	2:51:58.0
120 yards hurdles	Charles Werner	14.6	Hugo Leistner		George Guthrie	
440 yards hurdles	John Gibson	52.6	F. Morgan Taylor	1 yd behind	Richard Pomeroy	
2 miles steeplechase	Ville Ritola (FIN)	10:19.4	Ove Andersen (FIN)		Willie Ruckel	
High jump	Robert King	1.90 m	Anton Burg	1.87 m	Harold Osborn	1.85 m
Pole vault	Lee Barnes	4.11 m	William Robusch	3.86 m	Frank Wirsig	3.86 m
Long jump	William DeHart Hubbard	7.84 m	Paul Jones	7.45 m	Edward Hamm	7.43 m
Triple jump	Levi Casey	14.75 m	Louis Minsky	14.27 m	Robert Patton	14.06 m
Shot put	John Kuck	14.76 m	Clifford Hoffman	14.56 m	Eric Krenz	14.55 m
Discus throw	Eric Krenz	44.75 m	Delmar Allman	43.64 m	John Anderson	43.51 m
Hammer throw	Jack Merchant	52.00 m	Donald Gwinn	49.97 m	Howard Linn	48.34 m
Javelin throw	Charles Harlow	58.92 m	Douglas Graydon	58.44 m	Carl Schjoll	55.32 m
Decathlon	Fait Elkins	7574.42 pts	Harry Frieda	7185.13 pts	Vernon Kennedy	6982.67 pts
220 yards hurdles	Robert Maxwell	24.2				
Pentathlon	Harry Flippen	8 pts				
Weight throw for distance	Patrick McDonald	11.08 m				
Weight throw for height	Pat McDonald	14 ft 8 1/4 in (4.47 m)				
Medley shot put	Eric Krenz	3 pts				

=== Women ===
Event	Gold		Silver		Bronze	
50 yards	Elta Cartwright	6.2	Eleanor Egg		Minnie Meyer	
100 yards	Elta Cartwright	11.4	Minnie Meyer		Margaret Ritchie	
200 m	Ellen Brough	26.8	Alta Huber		Frances Keddie	
800 m	Marcelle Barkley	2:36.6	Irene Sand		Rea Strickland	
80 yards hurdles	Helen Filkey	8.2	Belle Owens		Aida Silva	
High jump	Catherine Maguire	1.53 m	Marion Holley		Margaret Clay	
Long jump	Eleanor Egg	5.22 m	Anne Vrana		Nellie Todd	
Shot put (8 lb)	Lillian Copeland	12.04 m	Fanny Burt	10.53 m	Catherine Maguire	10.40 m
Discus throw	Lillian Copeland	31.61 m	Fanny Burt		Dee Boeckman	
Javelin throw	Margaret Jenkins	38.80 m	Lillian Copeland		Fanny Burt	
Baseball throw	Margaret Jenkins	233 ft 11 1/2 in (71.31 m)				

== See also ==
- 1927 USA Indoor Track and Field Championships
- List of USA Outdoor Track and Field Championships winners (men)
- List of USA Outdoor Track and Field Championships winners (women)
