= Athletics at the 1928 Summer Olympics – Women's 800 metres =

Women's 800 metres at the Games of the IX Olympiad
- Venue: Olympic Stadium; Amsterdam, Netherlands
- Date: 1 August 1928 (heats); 2 August 1928 (final)
- Winning time: 2:16.8 WR

Medalists
1st place, gold medalist(s)		Lina Radke	Germany
2nd place, silver medalist(s)		Kinue Hitomi	Japan
3rd place, bronze medalist(s)		Inga Gentzel	Sweden

The women's 800 metres at the 1928 Summer Olympics took place at the Olympic Stadium Amsterdam, Netherlands, on 1 and 2 August 1928. Some press reports of the event claimed that many of the competitors were exhausted or failed to finish the race. According to Lynne Emery, these reports were inaccurate and the athletes were winded as normal after a race. In any case, the idea that the distance was too great for women prompted the IOC to drop it from the Olympic programme. It was reintroduced in 1960.

== Results ==
Twenty-five athletes from fourteen nations competed in the heats on 1 August.

=== Heats ===
Results of heat 1
Rank	Athlete	Nation	Time	Notes
1	Marie Dollinger	Germany	2:22.4	OR, Q
2	Inga Gentzel	Sweden		Q
3	Bobbie Rosenfeld	Canada		Q
4	Jo Mallon	Netherlands		
5	Elisabeth Oestreich	Germany		
6	Dee Boeckmann	United States		

Results of heat 2
Rank	Athlete	Nation	Time	Notes
1	Lina Radke	Germany	2:26.0	Q
2	Kinue Hitomi	Japan	2:26.4	Q
3	Gertruda Kilosówna	Poland	2:28.0	Q
4	Aat van Noort	Netherlands		
5	Edie Robinson	Australia		
6	Juliette Segers	Belgium		
7	Sébastienne Guyot	France		
8	Emy Pettersson	Sweden		
9	Giannina Marchini	Italy		
10	Rayma Wilson	United States		

Results of heat 3
Rank	Athlete	Nation	Time	Notes
1	Jean Thompson	Canada	2:23.2	Q
2	Florence MacDonald	United States		Q
3	Elfriede Wever	Germany		Q
4	Mien Duchateau	Netherlands		
5	Ida Degrande	Belgium		
6	Marcelle Neveu	France		
7	Otylia Tabacka	Poland	2:33.0	
8	Josefine Lauterbach	Austria		
9	Paula Radziulytė	Lithuania		

=== Final ===
Nine athletes from six nations competed in the final on 2 August.

Results of the final
Rank	Athlete	Nation	Time	Notes
1st place, gold medalist(s)	Lina Radke	Germany	2:16.8	WR
2nd place, silver medalist(s)	Kinue Hitomi	Japan	2:17.6	
3rd place, bronze medalist(s)	Inga Gentzel	Sweden	2:17.8	
4	Jean Thompson	Canada	2:21.6	
5	Bobbie Rosenfeld	Canada	2:22.4	
6	Florence MacDonald	United States	2:22.6	
7	Marie Dollinger	Germany	2:23.0	
8	Gertruda Kilosówna	Poland	2:28.0	
9	Elfriede Wever	Germany		
