= Dolphus Stroud =

American scholar, athlete, and educator

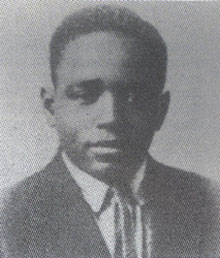
- Dolphus c. 1931
- Born: September 17, 1907; Colorado Springs, Colorado, U.S.
- Died: 1975 (aged 67–68); Washington D.C., U.S.
- Education: Colorado College (BA); University of Mexico (MA)

Kelley (Note: Family members disagree on whether he spelled his first name as Kelly or Kelley) Dolphus Stroud (September 17, 1907 – 1975) was an American scholar, athlete, and educator from Colorado Springs, Colorado.

== History ==
=== Early life ===
Stroud's mother, Lulu Magee Stroud, was of the Creek Nation and grew up in what is now Oklahoma, while his father was raised on a Texas slave plantation until the age of 19, when he fled to Indian Territory in Oklahoma, where he met Lulu. They fled for Colorado after the Oklahoma Enabling Act, anticipating Jim Crow laws in the new state.

While the schools in Colorado Springs were not segregated, Stroud encountered racism from others in the town throughout his childhood. He stated that the swimming pools were racially segregated, that the local Black teens used a pond in an abandoned brickyard as an impromptu pool, and that he was present when another teen was caught in barbed wire at the bottom of the pond and drowned. He said that there was a threat of being taken to city hall and forced to dance for cops. He stated that others threw rocks at him and his family as he walked home from class.

=== Academics ===
Stroud began his higher education journey at Colorado College in 1926, after being accepted to Harvard University but unable to attend due to financial constraints. He graduated cum laude in 1931 with a degree in political science and was the first Black student at Colorado College to be elected to Phi Beta Kappa.

He earned a Rosenwald Fellowship to complete his master's degree at the University of Mexico, where he wrote a thesis on the history of Blacks in the Americas in Spanish.

=== Athletics ===
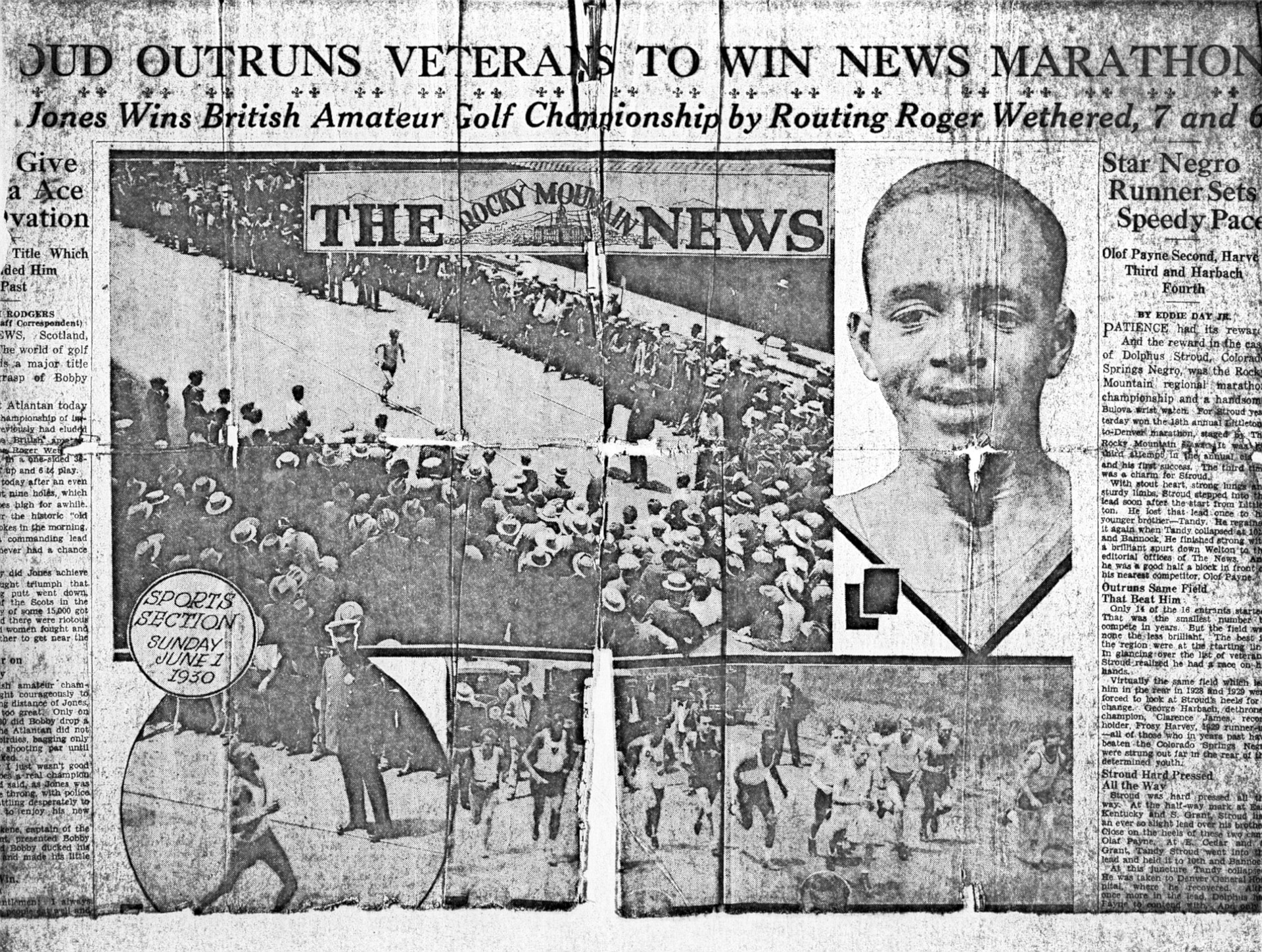
A The Rocky Mountain Times article about Stroud's victory in a 1930 marathon

Stroud was barred from running at Colorado Springs High School. In his memoir, he recounts the Colorado College track coach also hesitated to allow him on, citing issues that the previous Black athlete had caused for the team. The coach, however, changed his tune after Stroud won a marathon. He spent his remaining time as a member of the Colorado College track team, winning races across the region. Stroud was nominated to be inducted into the Colorado College Athletic Hall of Fame in 2006; however, as of 2021, he still had not been inducted into the Colorado Springs hall.

In June 1928, Stroud won the 5,000 metre Rocky Mountain regional Olympic qualifier. He expected the organizers to cover his transportation costs to Boston for the 1928 United States Olympic trials. After winning, he was informed that they would not be covering his expenses, alleging that he did not approach the previous record, which was a requirement. It was speculated that this may have been an excuse the organizers invented to prevent a Black man from riding on a bus with white athletes. After being declined funding, Stroud walked, ran, and hitchhiked for 12 days over the course of 1,765 miles. He departed at 4 a.m., wielding a "Denver to Olympia" sign, $10, a backpack, water, and a golf club for protection. Initially, the streets were desolate—he reported sometimes walking 20 miles without seeing another car—but coverage in the Chicago Daily News led to an increase in pickups. He ultimately arrived six hours before the start of his race. Due to malnutrition and exhaustion he was unable to complete the race, collapsing on his sixth lap.

=== Later life ===
Stroud taught in Georgia and Texas, before moving to Portland, Oregon. In Oregon, he founded a golf tournament as well as a moving and storage company. He died on a visit to Washington, D.C. in 1975.

== Legacy ==
The Colorado College Stroud Scholars program, named in his honor, supported high-promise youth.
