= Long jump world record progression =

Long jump world record progression may refer to:

- Men's long jump world record progression
- Women's long jump world record progression
