= Margaret Ritchie =

Margaret Ritchie may refer to:

- Margaret Ritchie (soprano) (1903–1969), English soprano
- Margaret Ritchie, Baroness Ritchie of Downpatrick (born 1958), Northern Ireland politician
- Meg Ritchie (born 1952), born Margaret Ritchie, Scottish discus thrower
- Margaret Ritchie (sprinter) (born 1909), American sprinter, 3rd in the 100 m at the 1927 USA Outdoor Track and Field Championships
