= Aat van Noort =

Dutch middle-distance runner

Personal information
- Nationality: Dutch
- Born: 30 April 1908 Leiden, Netherlands
- Died: 1 March 1998 (aged 89)

Sport
- Sport: Middle-distance running
- Event: 800 metres

Aat van Noort (30 April 1908 – 1 March 1998) was a Dutch middle-distance runner. She competed in the women's 800 metres at the 1928 Summer Olympics.
