= Men's long jump world record progression =

The men's long jump world record progression lists records ratified by the International Association of Athletics Federations (IAAF) starting in 1912. The inaugural record was the 7.61 m (24 ft 11 1/2 in) performance by Peter O'Connor in 1901.

== Record progression ==
=== Indoor ===
Only Lewis' 8.79 m in 1984 was ratified by the IAAF.

Men's long jump indoor world record progression
Mark	Athlete	Place	Date
6.97 m (22 ft 10 1/4 in)	T. Rodgers (USA)	San Francisco	5 January 1907
6.98 m (22 ft 10 3/4 in)	Harry Worthington (USA)	Hanover, NH	8 March 1916
7.11 m (23 ft 3 3/4 in)	Aleksander Klumberg (EST)	Tartu	19 December 1922
7.49 m (24 ft 6 3/4 in)	William DeHart Hubbard (USA)	Urbana	1 March 1924
7.50 m (24 ft 7 1/4 in)	William DeHart Hubbard (USA)	New York	20 March 1926
7.70 m (25 ft 3 in)	Jesse Owens (USA)	New York	24 February 1934
7.71 m (25 ft 3 1/2 in)	Eulace Peacock (USA)	New York	23 February 1935
7.82 m (25 ft 7 3/4 in)	Jesse Owens (USA)	New York	23 February 1935
7.85 m (25 ft 9 in)	Jesse Owens (USA)	New York	23 February 1935
7.86 m (25 ft 9 1/4 in)	Irvin Roberson (USA)	New York	20 February 1960
7.87 m (25 ft 9 3/4 in)	Ralph Boston (USA)	Los Angeles	21 January 1961
7.91 m (25 ft 11 1/4 in)	Ralph Boston (USA)	New York	17 February 1961
7.97 m (26 ft 1 3/4 in)	Ralph Boston (USA)	New York	17 February 1961
8.08 m (26 ft 6 in)	Ralph Boston (USA)	New York	25 February 1961
8.18 m (26 ft 10 in)	Igor Ter-Ovanesyan (URS)	New York	1 February 1963
8.19 m (26 ft 10 1/4 in)	Igor Ter-Ovanesyan (URS)	Leningrad	19 March 1966
8.23 m (27 ft 0 in)	Igor Ter-Ovanesyan (URS)	Dortmund	27 March 1966
8.25 m (27 ft 3/4 in)	Bob Beamon (USA)	Kansas City	20 January 1968
8.30 m (27 ft 2 3/4 in)	Bob Beamon (USA)	Detroit	15 March 1968
8.38 m (27 ft 5 3/4 in)	Larry Myricks (USA)	Johnson City	11 January 1980
8.38 m (27 ft 5 3/4 in)	Larry Myricks (USA)	San Diego	22 February 1980
8.49 m (27 ft 10 1/4 in)	Carl Lewis (USA)	Fort Worth	20 February 1981
8.56 m (28 ft 1 in)	Carl Lewis (USA)	East Rutherford	16 January 1982
8.79 m (28 ft 10 in)	Carl Lewis (USA)	New York	27 January 1984

=== Outdoor ===
Men's long jump world record progression (all altitudes).

Mark	Wind	Athlete	Place	Date
7.61 m (24 ft 11 1/2 in)		Peter O'Connor (IRE)	Dublin, Ireland	5 August 1901
7.69 m (25 ft 2 3/4 in)		Edward Gourdin (USA)	Cambridge, United States	23 July 1921
7.76 m (25 ft 5 1/2 in)		Robert LeGendre (USA)	Paris, France	7 July 1924
7.89 m (25 ft 10 1/2 in)		DeHart Hubbard (USA)	Chicago, United States	13 June 1925
7.90 m (25 ft 11 in)		Edward Hamm (USA)	Cambridge, United States	7 July 1928
7.93 m (26 ft 0 in)	0.0	Sylvio Cator (HAI)	Paris, France	9 September 1928
7.98 m (26 ft 2 in)	0.5	Chuhei Nambu (JPN)	Tokyo, Japan	27 October 1931
8.13 m (26 ft 8 in)	1.5	Jesse Owens (USA)	Ann Arbor, United States	25 May 1935
8.21 m (26 ft 11 in)	0.0	Ralph Boston (USA)	Walnut, United States	12 August 1960
8.24 m (27 ft 1/4 in)	1.8	Ralph Boston (USA)	Modesto, United States	27 May 1961
8.28 m (27 ft 1 3/4 in)	1.2	Ralph Boston (USA)	Moscow, Soviet Union	16 July 1961
8.31 m (27 ft 3 in) A	−0.1	Igor Ter-Ovanesyan (URS)	Yerevan, Soviet Union	10 June 1962
8.33 m (27 ft 3 3/4 in)		Phil Shinnick (USA)	Modesto, United States	25 May 1963
8.31 m (27 ft 3 in)	0.0	Ralph Boston (USA)	Kingston, Jamaica	15 August 1964 (Note: Phil Shinnick's 8.33 metre jump from 1963 was recognized as a World Record in 2021 and added to the progression list, "with no deletion of later marks." Hence, Ralph Boston's 8.31 metre jump from 1964 remains on the list.)
8.34 m (27 ft 4 1/4 in)	1.0	Ralph Boston (USA)	Los Angeles, United States	12 September 1964
8.35 m (27 ft 4 1/2 in)	0.0	Ralph Boston (USA)	Modesto, United States	29 May 1965
8.35 m (27 ft 4 1/2 in) A	0.0	Igor Ter-Ovanesyan (URS)	Mexico City, Mexico	19 October 1967
8.90 m (29 ft 2 1/4 in) A	2.0	Bob Beamon (USA)	Mexico City, Mexico	18 October 1968
8.95 m (29 ft 4 1/4 in)	0.3	Mike Powell (USA)	Tokyo, Japan	30 August 1991

==== Low-altitude record progression 1965–1991 ====
The IAAF considers marks set at high altitude as acceptable for record consideration. However, high altitude can significantly assist long jump performances. At the 1968 Summer Olympics in Mexico City, Bob Beamon broke the existing record by a margin of 55 cm (21 1/2 in), and his world record of 8.90 m (29 ft 2 1/4 in) stood until Mike Powell jumped 8.95 m (29 ft 4 1/4 in) in 1991. However, Beamon's jump was set at an altitude of 2,292 m (7,520 ft), with a maximum allowable wind, factors which assisted his performance.

This list contains the progression of long jump marks set at low altitude starting with the mark that stood at Beamon's record in 1968 to Powell's 1991 world record.

Mark	Wind	Athlete	Place	Date
8.35 m (27 ft 4 1/2 in)	0.0	Ralph Boston (USA)	Modesto, United States	29 May 1965
8.35 m (27 ft 4 1/2 in)	0.8	Josef Schwarz (FRG)	Stuttgart, West Germany	15 July 1970
8.45 m (27 ft 8 1/2 in)	2.0	Nenad Stekić (YUG)	Montreal, Canada	25 July 1975
8.52 m (27 ft 11 1/4 in)	0.0	Larry Myricks (USA)	Montreal, Canada	26 August 1979
8.54 m (28 ft 0 in)	0.9	Lutz Dombrowski (GDR)	Moscow, Soviet Union	28 July 1980
8.62 m (28 ft 3 1/4 in)	0.8	Carl Lewis (USA)	Sacramento, United States	20 June 1981
8.76 m (28 ft 8 3/4 in)	1.0	Carl Lewis (USA)	Indianapolis, United States	24 July 1982
8.79 m (28 ft 10 in)	1.9	Carl Lewis (USA)	Indianapolis, United States	19 June 1983
8.95 m (29 ft 4 1/4 in)	0.3	Mike Powell (USA)	Tokyo, Japan	30 August 1991

== See also ==
- Women's long jump world record progression
- Men's long jump Italian record progression
