= Elisabeth Oestreich =

German middle-distance runner

Personal information
- Nationality: German
- Born: 10 June 1909
- Died: 21 May 1994 (aged 84)

Sport
- Sport: Middle-distance running
- Event: 800 metres

Elisabeth Oestreich (10 June 1909 – 21 May 1994) was a German middle-distance runner. She competed in the women's 800 metres at the 1928 Summer Olympics.
