= Jo Mallon =

Dutch middle-distance runner

Personal information
- Nationality: Dutch
- Born: 23 October 1905 Gouda, Netherlands
- Died: 2 May 1970 (aged 64) Schiedam, Netherlands

Sport
- Sport: Middle-distance running
- Event: 800 metres

Jo Mallon (23 October 1905 – 2 May 1970) was a Dutch middle-distance runner. She competed in the women's 800 metres at the 1928 Summer Olympics.
