= Josefine Lauterbach =

Austrian middle-distance runner

Personal information
- Nationality: Austrian
- Born: 22 March 1903
- Died: 4 November 1972 (aged 69)

Sport
- Sport: Middle-distance running
- Event: 800 metres

Josefine Lauterbach (22 March 1909 – 4 November 1972) was an Austrian middle-distance runner. She competed in the women's 800 metres at the 1928 Summer Olympics.
