= Gertruda Kilosówna =

Polish middle-distance runner

- Kilosówna in 1928

Personal information
- Nationality: Polish
- Born: 9 February 1913 Ruda Śląska, Poland
- Died: 4 December 1938 (aged 25) Kraków, Poland

Sport
- Sport: Middle-distance running
- Event: 800 metres

Gertruda Kilosówna (9 February 1913 – 4 December 1938) was a Polish middle-distance runner. She competed in the women's 800 metres at the 1928 Summer Olympics.

She died from throat cancer.
