= Mien Duchateau =

Dutch middle-distance runner

Personal information
- Nationality: Dutch
- Born: 9 November 1904
- Died: 28 April 1999 (aged 94)

Sport
- Sport: Middle-distance running
- Event: 800 metres

Mien Duchateau (9 November 1904 – 28 April 1999) was a Dutch middle-distance runner. She competed in the women's 800 metres at the 1928 Summer Olympics.
