= Anne O'Brien (athlete) =

American athlete (1911–2007)

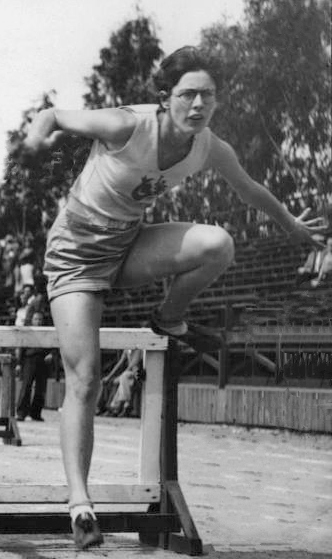
- O'Brien in 1932

Personal information
- Born: August 22, 1911 Schenectady, New York, U.S.
- Died: July 30, 2007 (aged 95) Tustin, California, U.S.
- Height: 168 cm (5 ft 6 in)
- Weight: 52 kg (115 lb)

Sport
- Sport: Athletics
- Events: 100 m, 80 m hurdles
- Club: Los Angeles Athletic Club

Achievements and titles
- Personal bests: 100 m - 12.4 (1932); 80 mH - 11.8 (1932)
Medal record
Representing United States

Anne Marie Vrana O'Brien (August 22, 1911 – July 30, 2007) was an American sprinter. She represented the United States at the 1928 Summer Olympics in the 100 meters and at the 1936 Summer Olympics in the 80-meter hurdles. In 1932 she equaled the 80-meter hurdles world record, but fell at the Olympic Trials and missed the Olympics.

== Biography ==
Anne Vrana was born in Schenectady, New York, to a Hungarian immigrant family. The family moved to California when she was young, and she took up running seriously as a student at Fremont High School in Los Angeles, where she was coached by 1924 Olympian Otto Anderson. She joined the Pasadena Athletic Club, which had a women's track and field team. At the 1927 AAU championships, her first significant meet, she placed second in the long jump and ran on the winning 4 × 110 yard relay team; she false started in the 100 meters, which she had considered her best event. In her early years Vrana copied Charley Paddock's jump finish in her races; she dropped the style later in her career.

Vrana placed third in the 100 meters at the 1928 United States Olympic Trials, qualifying for the Summer Olympics in Amsterdam. At the Olympics she placed third in her heat and was eliminated. Vrana married Howard O'Brien, a fellow Fremont High track athlete, in 1930; subsequently, she competed as Anne O'Brien. O'Brien took up the 80-meter hurdles before the next Olympics, prompted by losses to local rival Evelyn Furtsch in flat races. In June 1932 she ran the hurdles in 11.8 at a regional tryout meet in Pasadena; the time equaled Marjorie Clark's world record from the previous year.

O'Brien entered the 1932 Olympic Trials as the national leader in the 80-meter hurdles, ahead of the eventual Olympic top two Babe Didrikson and Evelyne Hall. In the Trials heats O'Brien fell at the fourth hurdle, failed to finish and was eliminated. Due to the cuts and abrasions she received in her fall she was given a tetanus shot, which made her ill; she was forced to withdraw from the semi-finals of her other event, the flat 100 meters. She was named to the American Olympic team as an alternate in the hurdles, but did not get the opportunity to compete.

O'Brien gave birth to a daughter in 1934, but continued competing; she won the 80-meter hurdles at the 1936 Trials, qualifying for her second Olympic Games. At the Olympics in Berlin she placed second in her heat and fourth in her semi-final; she narrowly missed qualifying for the final.

O'Brien's athletic career tapered off after 1936, though she continued competing in minor meets into her forties. She died in Tustin, California in July 2007, aged 95.
