= Nick Carter (runner) =

American track and field athlete (1902–1997)

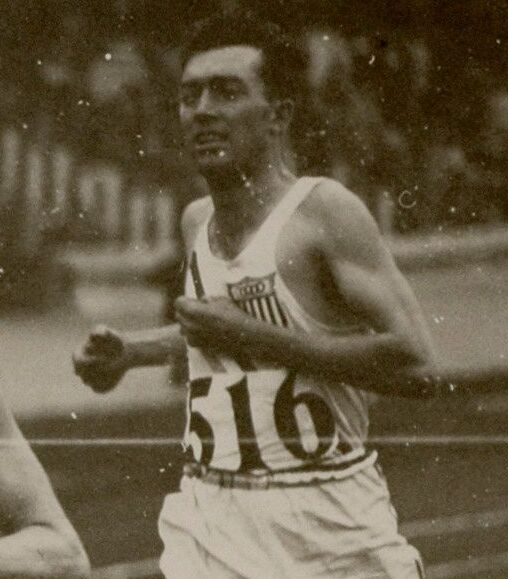
Nick Carter in 1928

Ernest Nicholas Newton Carter (September 4, 1902, in Globe, Arizona Territory – September 26, 1997, in Santa Barbara, California) was an American track and field athlete, coach and official. He ran the 1500 metres in the 1928 Summer Olympics in Amsterdam, finishing a non-qualifying 3rd place in his heat.

Carter ran for Occidental College, finishing second in the Mile run at the NCAA Men's Outdoor Track and Field Championships in 1925. He also finished third in the USA Outdoor Track and Field Championships twice, in 1927 and 1928. Prior to Occidental, he ran for Lompoc High School, finishing second at the 1921 CIF California State Meet.

Carter graduated from Occidental College in 1928 and then moved to the Claremont Graduate University. Following college, he became the Olympic track coach for the Peruvian Olympic team.

Carter made his career as the track and field coach at Santa Barbara State College which later became the University of California, Santa Barbara, starting in 1939.

Following his career as a coach, Carter was a long-time AAU, TAC, and USATF Commissioner and Official, serving until shortly before his death at meets like the Santa Barbara Easter Relays. He was on the Easter Relays organizing committee for 53 years. The track at Santa Barbara City College that houses the Easter Relays bears his name. For decades, UCSB's annual invitational track meet was called the Nick Carter Invitational. He is a member of the Occidental College Track and Field Hall of Fame.
