= Otto Anderson =

American decathlete (1900–1963)

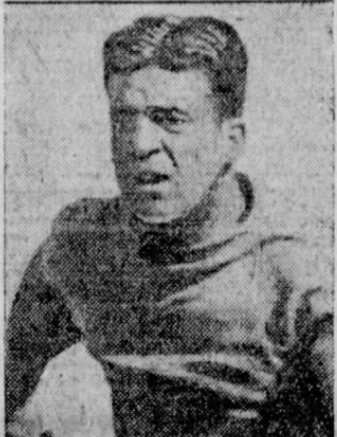
- Anderson pictured in the Los Angeles Herald-Express, 1924

Personal information
- Born: October 28, 1900 Guthrie, Oklahoma Territory, U.S.
- Died: November 15, 1963 (aged 63) Pasadena, California, U.S

Sport
- Sport: Athletics
- Event: Decathlon

Otto Anderson (October 28, 1900 – November 15, 1963) was an American athlete. He competed at the 1920 Antwerp Olympics and the 1924 Paris Olympics,.

Anderson was born in Guthrie, Oklahoma on October 28, 1900. He started his athletics career with the hurdles while still a student at Pomona High School. Still at school, he qualified for the 1920 Antwerp Olympics team in the hop, skip and jump (now called the triple jump). He competed at that event, but the results are proving difficult to find.

After leaving school, he attended the University of Southern California (U.S.C.) where he added more track events and football to his activities. In the 1922 AAU Championship he finished second in the 220 yard hurdles. In March 1923 at the annual games between Stanford University and U.S.C., he equalled the world record for the 220 yard "low hurdles" event, in 24.8 seconds.

Anderson qualified for the fourth of four places to compete in the men's decathlon at the 1924 Olympics. Once in Paris, he was injured in a bad landing in the sawdust pit during pole vault practice. His Achilles tendon was torn loose among other injuries, and he was unable to complete the competition.

1925 was his final year at U.S.C. and he was captain of their track team, and captain of the Intercollegiate Association of Amateur Athletes of America (I.C.A.A.A.A.) champions. After graduating from U.S.C., he competed for Los Angeles AC and Hollywood AC. At the national AAU Championship he finished second in the decathlon.

Later he took a coaching role at Fremont High School in Los Angeles, where he coached Anne Vrana-O’Brien, who went on to represent the USA at the Olympics in 1928 and 1936.
