= Dee Boeckmann =

American middle-distance runner

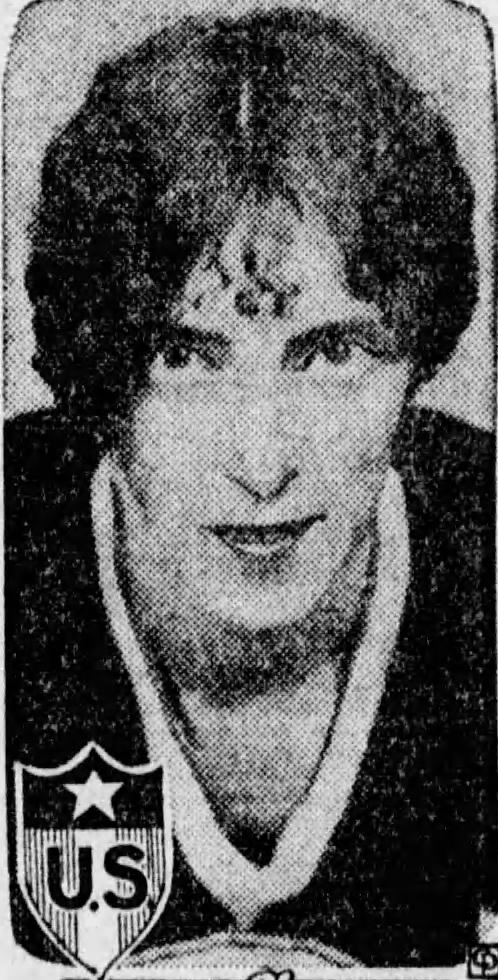
- Boeckmann in 1928

Personal information
- Nationality: American
- Born: November 9, 1906 St. Louis, Missouri
- Died: April 25, 1989 (aged 82) Creve Coeur, Missouri

Sport
- Sport: Middle-distance running
- Event: 800 metres

Delores "Dee" Boeckmann (November 9, 1906 – April 25, 1989) was an American middle-distance runner. She competed in the women's 800 metres at the 1928 Summer Olympics. Apart from competing, Boeckmann was the first woman to coach the United States national track and field team during the 1936 Summer Olympics. She was inducted into the National Track and Field Hall of Fame in 1976.

== Early life and education ==
Boeckmann was born on November 9, 1906, in St. Louis, Missouri. She began competing in athletics while in elementary school. She completed her post-secondary education in a multitude of universities including Harris–Stowe State University and Washington University.

== Career ==
In 1927, Boeckmann set records in the 50 metres and 800 metres events. She competed at the 1928 Summer Olympics in the 800 metres. At the 1936 Summer Olympics Boeckmann became the first woman to coach the United States national track and field team beating three men to the post in a ballot; including the coach of the 1932 US women's Olympics squad, George Breeland. Outside of athletic competition, Boeckmann was a director in physical education and athletics.

During World War II, Boeckmann became a United States Army recreational director. After the war, she continued her work with the army as a sports director in 1948. While with the army, she was named coach of the Japan women's national track and field team in 1950. Boeckmann's final Olympics with the United States was at the 1964 Summer Olympics as a director. She ended her career in 1972.

== Death ==
On April 25, 1989, Boeckmann died in Creve Coeur, Missouri.

== Awards and honors ==
In 1976, Boeckmann was inducted into the National Track and Field Hall of Fame.
