= Elfriede Wever =

German middle-distance runner

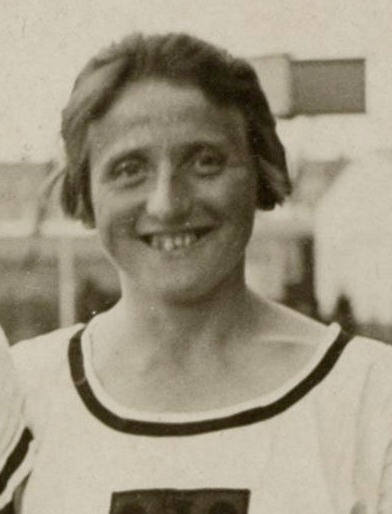
- Elfriede Wever at the 1928 Olympics

Personal information
- Born: 6 July 1900 Lennep, Germany
- Died: 30 November 1941 (aged 41) Lennep, Germany
- Height: 1.64 m (5 ft 5 in)
- Weight: 58 kg (128 lb)

Sport
- Sport: Running
- Club: VfL 07 Lennep

Achievements and titles
- Olympic finals: 1928

Elfriede Wever (later Senden; 6 July 1900 – 30 November 1941) was a German runner. She competed at the 1928 Olympics in the 800 m event and finished in ninth place.
