= Rayma Wilson =

American middle-distance runner

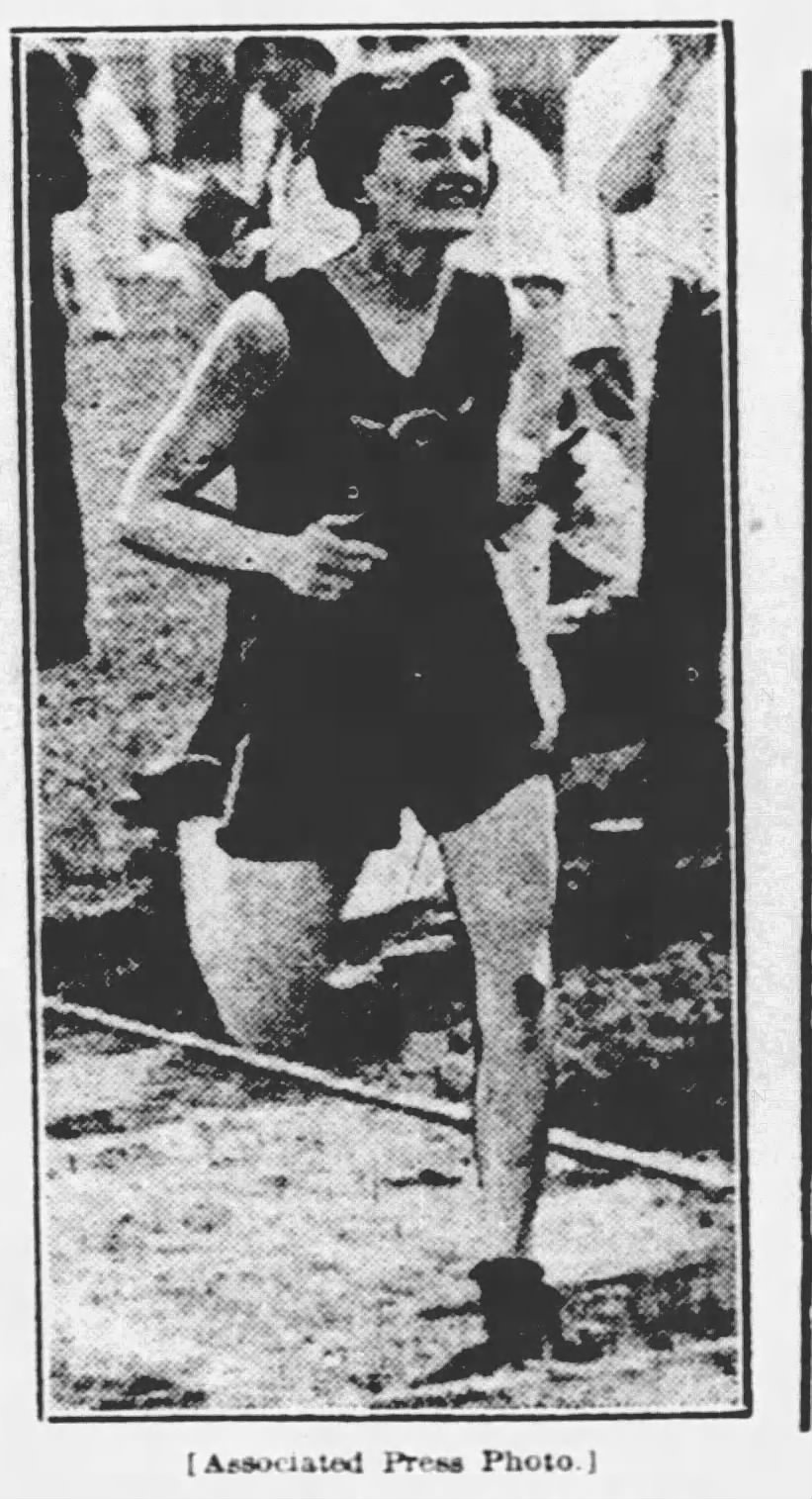
- Wilson in 1928, photo by Associated Press

Personal information
- Nationality: American
- Born: August 28, 1910
- Died: June 21, 1985 (aged 74)

Sport
- Sport: Middle-distance running
- Event: 800 metres

Rayma Wilson (August 28, 1910 – June 21, 1985) was an American middle-distance runner. She competed in the women's 800 metres at the 1928 Summer Olympics.
