= Gloria Russell =

American javelin thrower (1912–1963)

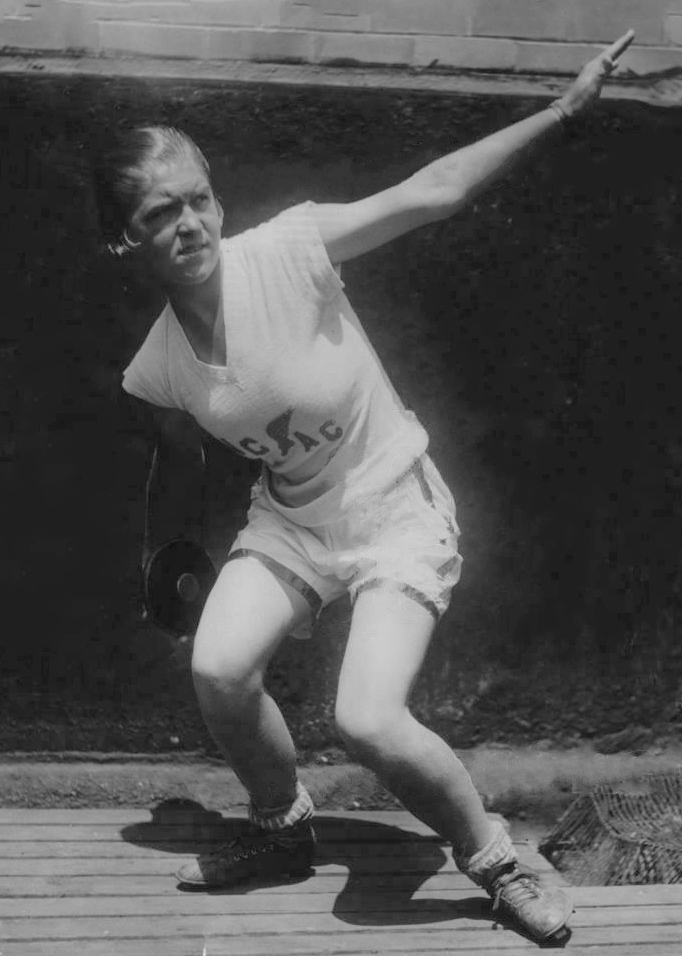
- Russell in 1928

Personal information
- Nationality: American
- Born: January 24, 1912 Eureka, California, U.S.
- Died: February 13, 1963 (aged 51) Alameda, California, U.S.

Sport
- Sport: Athletics
- Events: Javelin throw, discus throw
- Club: Western Women's Club, San Francisco

Achievements and titles
- Personal bests: JT – 38.71 m (1932); DT – 35.88 m (1932)

Gloria Russell (January 24, 1912 – February 13, 1963) was an American athlete. Competing in the javelin throw, she finished sixth at the 1932 Summer Olympics. Nationally she placed second in 1928, third in 1932 and fourth in 1929. In 1928–29 she was voted California Girls' State Athlete of the Year. Besides athletics Russell played softball for the J. J. Krieg women's team, which won the national title in 1938 and 1939. In 1929 she also won the national title in the baseball throw. Russell was severely injured in June 1931, when she was hit by a javelin.
