= Robert Juday =

American high jumper (1900–1988)

Personal information
- Nationality: American
- Born: June 24, 1900
- Died: January 30, 1988 (aged 87)

Sport
- Sport: Athletics
- Event: High jump

Robert Juday (June 24, 1900 – January 30, 1988) was an American athlete. He competed in the men's high jump at the 1924 Summer Olympics.
