= Florence MacDonald =

American middle-distance runner

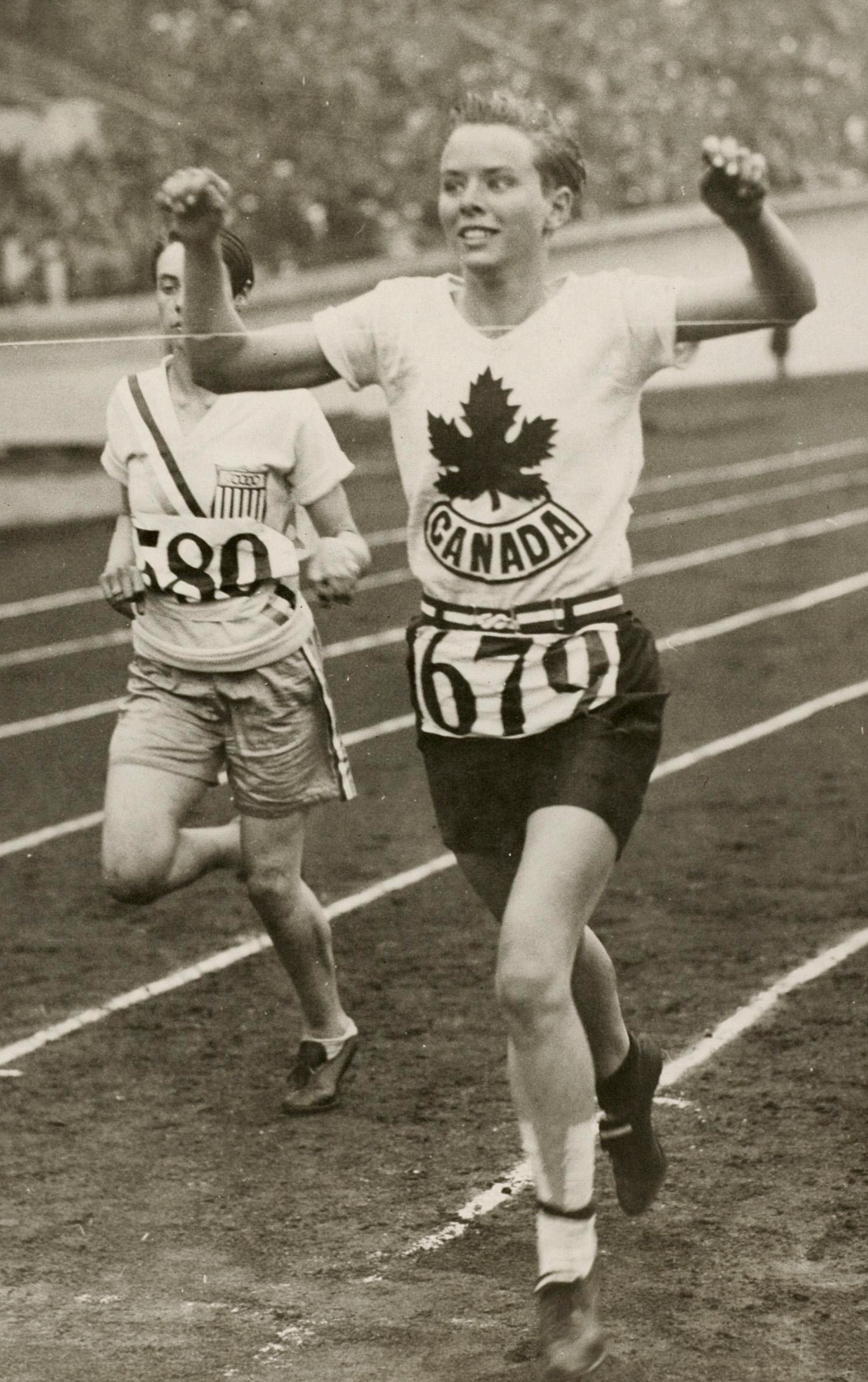
- Florence MacDonald (left) behind Jean Thompson at the 1928 Olympics

Personal information
- Born: October 27, 1909 Sydney, Nova Scotia, Canada
- Died: May 6, 2008 (aged 98) South Boston, Massachusetts, United States

Sport
- Sport: Running
- Club: Boston Swimming Association

Achievements and titles
- Olympic finals: 1928

Florence E. MacDonald (October 28, 1909 – May 6, 2008) was an American middle-distance runner. She competed at the 1928 Olympics in the 800 m event and finished in sixth place, setting a new national record at 2:22.6.

MacDonald was born to Angus R. and Mary (Currie) MacDonald and had two sisters, Christina E. MacDonald and Margaret Janowicz. She married Peter Campbell and gave birth to a daughter, June Marie Russo, and a son, John Scott Campbell. For 25 years she worked as a nurse at a school of medicine.
