= Creth Hines =

American javelin thrower (1906–1982)

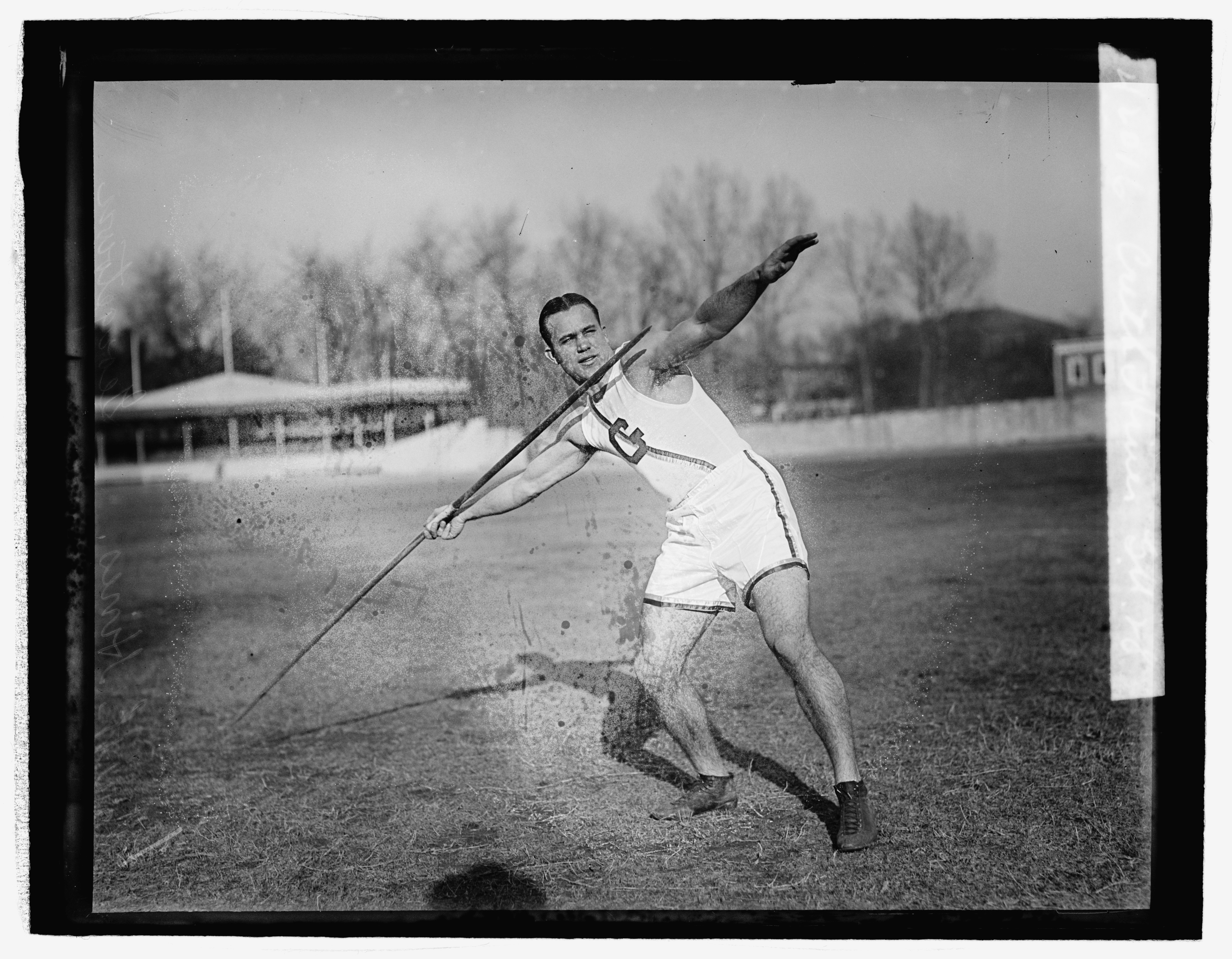

Personal information
- Born: March 8, 1906 Houston, Texas, United States
- Died: October 7, 1982 (aged 76) Houston, Texas, United States

Sport
- Sport: Athletics
- Event: Javelin throw

Creth Hines (March 8, 1906 – October 7, 1982) was an American athlete. He competed in the men's javelin throw at the 1928 Summer Olympics.
