= William Agee (athlete) =

American long-distance runner

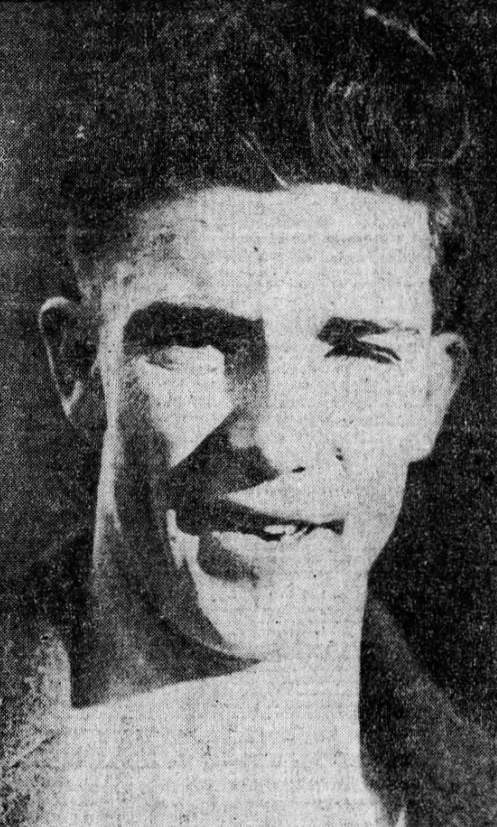
- Agee (c. 1927)

Personal information
- Born: December 25, 1905 Richmond, Virginia, United States
- Died: March 26, 1954 (aged 48) Baltimore, Maryland, United States

Sport
- Sport: Long-distance running
- Event: Marathon

William Agee (December 25, 1905 – March 26, 1954) was an American long-distance runner. He competed in the marathon at the 1928 Summer Olympics. Agee committed suicide by carbon monoxide poisoning in 1954.
