= Chief Elkins =

American football player and decathlete (1899–1966)

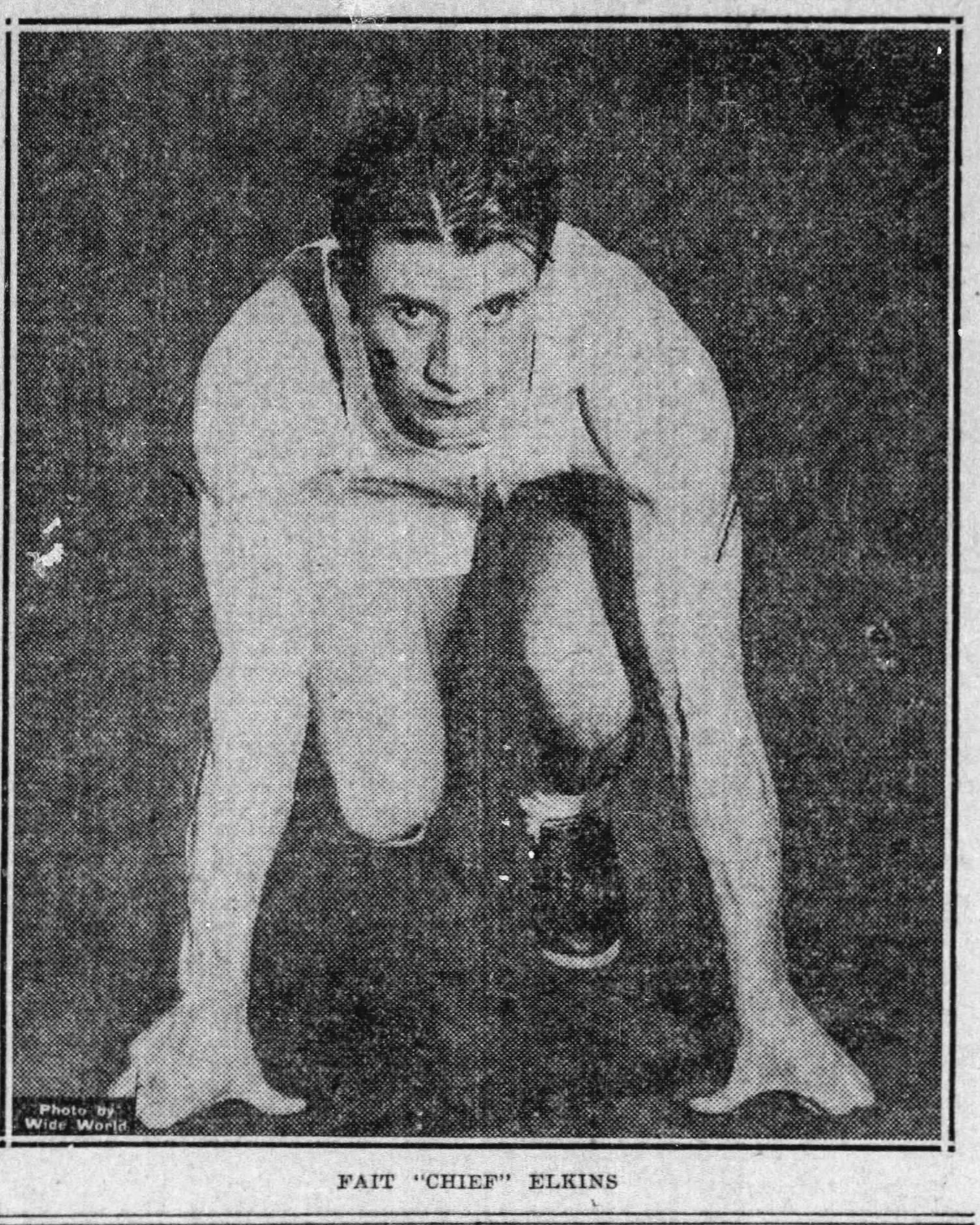
- Elkins in 1928

Profile
- Position: Back

Personal information
- Born: August 16, 1899; Utica, New York, U.S.
- Died: August 10, 1966 (aged 67); Philadelphia, Pennsylvania, U.S.
- Listed height: 5 ft 11 in (1.80 m)
- Listed weight: 190 lb (86 kg)

Career information
- High school: Haskell (KS)
- College: Haskell, Southeastern State Teachers (Durant, Oklahoma), Dallas University, Nebraska

Career history
- Frankford Yellow Jackets (1928–1929); Chicago Cardinals (1929); Cincinnati Reds (1933)
- Stats at Pro Football Reference

Fait Vernon "Chief" Elkins (August 16, 1899 – August 9, 1966) was an American football player and decathlete.

Elkins was born in Utica, New York, in 1899. He enrolled at the Haskell Indian School at age 15. He played college football at Haskell (1921–1923), Southeastern State Teachers College, Dallas University, and Nebraska (1926–1927). He held the national decathlon record in 1928 while attending Nebraska. He pulled a tendon that prevented him from competing in the 1928 Summer Olympics.

Elkins also played professional football in the National Football League (NFL) as a back for the Frankford Yellow Jackets (1928–1929), Chicago Cardinals (1929), and Cincinnati Reds (1933). He appeared in 20 NFL games, 10 as a starter.

Elkins died in Philadelphia in 1966.

He was posthumously profiled by Sports Illustrated in 1991 as "among the greatest athletes ever seen in this country — a golden sportsman during sport's golden age."
