= Hugo Leistner =

American hurdler (1902–2002)

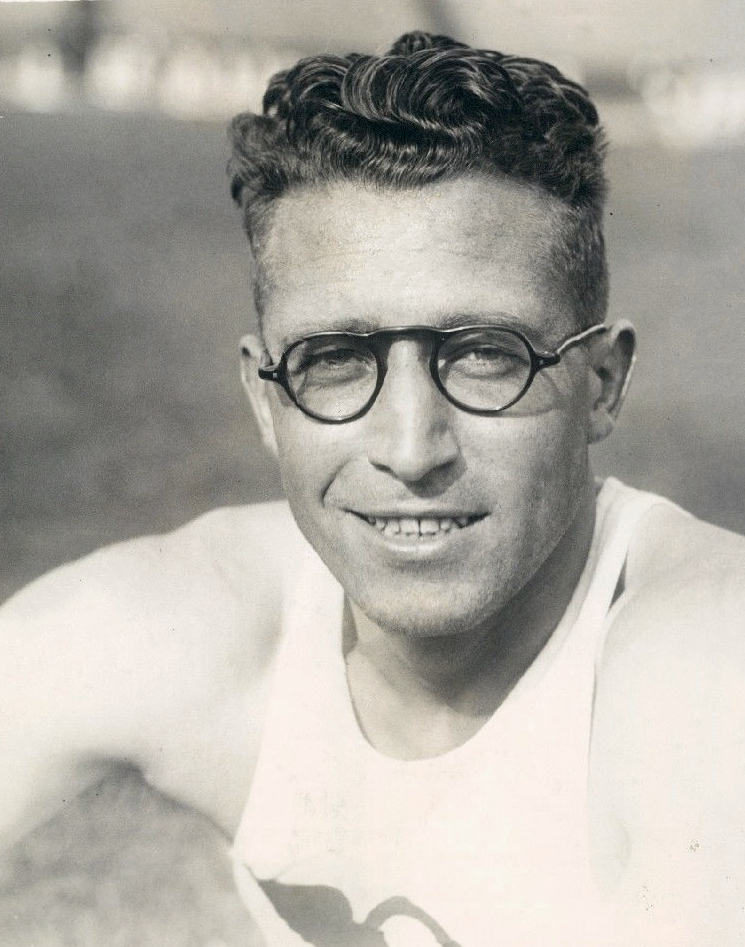

Personal information
- Born: July 31, 1902 Nuremberg, Germany
- Died: May 11, 2002 (aged 99) Coeur d'Alene, Idaho, U.S.
- Education: Stanford University

Sport
- Sport: Athletics
- Event: Hurdles

Achievements and titles
- Personal best(s): 110 mH – 14.6 (1925); 400 mH – 55.0 (1928)

Hugo "Swede" Leistner (July 31, 1902 – May 11, 2002) was an American hurdler. Leistner won the NCAA championship in the 120 yd hurdles in 1925 and placed in the top four at the United States championships several times in both that event and the 220 yd hurdles.

== Biography ==
Leistner was born in Nuremberg, Germany, but immigrated to the United States with his family as a child. He became a good hurdler at Palo Alto High School; after graduating from high school in 1921 he started studying civil engineering at Stanford University and joined coach Dink Templeton's track and field squad there. He won both the 120 yd (109.7 m) high hurdles and the 220 yd low hurdles in a freshmen's dual meet against the California Golden Bears in 1922. As a sophomore in 1923 he placed second in the 120 yd hurdles at the NCAA championships, losing only to Kansas State's Ivan Riley; he also scored in the low hurdles, placing fourth.

In 1924 no NCAA championship meet was held, but Leistner placed second in the 120 yd hurdles at the IC4A championships, the other major collegiate meet of the time. He also competed in the 1924 Olympic Trials, qualifying from the heats but going out in the semi-finals and failing to make the team. Leistner's times improved the following year, and he was a leading candidate to be Stanford's team captain, though that honor eventually went to thrower Glenn "Tiny" Hartranft. Leistner won the 1925 NCAA 120 yard hurdles in 14.6, defeating Ohio State's George Guthrie, an Olympic finalist from the previous year; in addition, he placed second to Morgan Taylor in the low hurdles. Stanford would have won the NCAA team title, but one wasn't awarded that year. At the national championships Leistner placed a close second to Guthrie in the high hurdles, losing by inches as Guthrie in turn was clocked in a meeting record 14.6; he also took second, behind Charles Brookins but ahead of Guthrie, in the low hurdles.

Although Leistner continued to study at Stanford, he had exhausted his college-level eligibility as a track and field athlete. Stanford attempted to turn him into a footballer, but he was ruled ineligible for that sport as well due to a rugby game he'd played in Canada. In 1926 he finished third in the 120 yd hurdles at the national championships, while in 1927 he placed second in both the high and the low hurdles.

May 14, 1927 ran 23.8 for 220 yard hurdles for the Olympic Club. Leistner remained in good form for the Olympic year of 1928, defeating another Stanford hurdler, Ross Nichols, at the Pacific Tryouts in 14.8. He was considered likely to qualify for the Olympics, but at the final Olympic Trials he failed to make it past the first round; he was leading his heat when he hit the fifth hurdle and fell. Despite his failure to qualify he still travelled to the Olympics with the American team, getting aboard the team's ship, the SS President Roosevelt, as a stowaway with several other athletes; in the end his trip to Amsterdam and back was duly paid for by a friend, but he was not allowed to compete at the Olympics.

Leistner placed at the national championships for a final time in 1929, taking fourth in the high hurdles. He later worked for the Southern California Gas Company, retiring in 1965; he died in Coeur d'Alene, Idaho in 2002. He is a member of the Stanford Athletics Hall of Fame.
