= Charles Harlow (athlete) =

American javelin thrower

Personal information
- Born: February 20, 1903 Celeste, Texas, United States
- Died: November 14, 1986 (aged 83) Long Beach, California, United States

Sport
- Sport: Athletics
- Event: Javelin throw

Charles Harlow (February 20, 1903 – November 14, 1986) was an American athlete. He competed in the men's javelin throw at the 1928 Summer Olympics.
