= Ed Hamm =

American track and field athlete

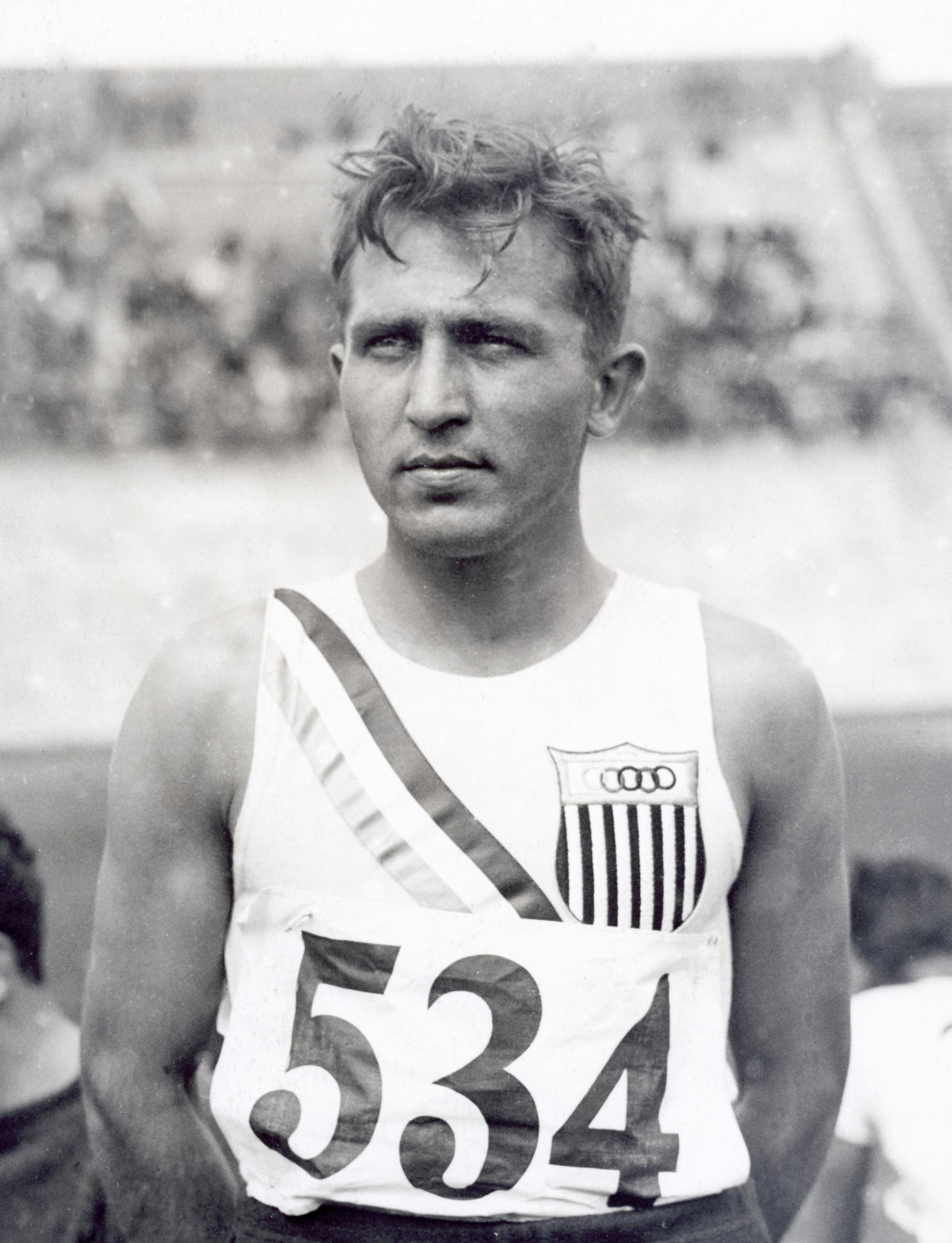
- Ed Hamm in July 1928

Personal information
- Full name: Edward Barton Hamm
- Born: April 13, 1906 Lonoke, Arkansas, U.S.
- Died: June 25, 1982 (aged 76) Albany, Oregon, U.S.
- Height: 5 ft 10 in (1.79 m)
- Weight: 150 lb (70 kg)

Sport
- Country: United States
- Sport: Athletics
- Events: Long jump, sprint
- Club: Georgia Tech Yellow Jackets, Atlanta

Achievements and titles
- Personal bests: LJ – 7.90 m (1928); 100 m – 10.5 (1928); 200 m – 21.6 (1928)
Medal record
Men's athletics
Representing the United States
Olympic Games
Gold medal – first place	1928 Amsterdam	Long jump

Edward Barton Hamm (April 13, 1906 – June 25, 1982) was an American athlete, who won the gold medal in the long jump at the 1928 Summer Olympics held in Amsterdam, Netherlands, becoming the first Arkansan to win a gold medal. The Atlanta Journal called him "the South's first world champion in any sport."

== Biography ==
Hamm was born in 1906, to Charles Edward Hamm, a plumber and electrician, and Zilpah Dare Harris Hamm. He was the oldest of five brothers and one sister. Raised in Lonoke, he excelled in sports, especially track and field. At Lonoke High School, he won the state long jump for three years straight, 1923 to 1925, setting a state record of 23 ft 2 in (7.06 m) his sophomore year. He won the state 220-yard dash all three years and the state 100-yard dash twice, despite attacks of malaria, which first affected him in his junior year and undoubtedly prevented him from bettering his records.

Hamm and teammate Hubert Davis were the only two Lonoke competitors to enter a high school invitational meet at the University of Arkansas in Fayetteville in 1925. He won first in the 100-yard dash, the 200-yard dash, the long jump, and the high jump, as well as finishing third place in the 440. Though the two could not enter the relays, together they won the meet by two points over Little Rock High School.

In his junior year (1924) Hamm set a world high school record of 24 feet 2 5/8 inches (7.382 m), which qualified him for the Olympic trials in Boston, Massachusetts. To pay for his trip, he borrowed $100 from Little Rock (Pulaski County) coach Earl Quigley. He failed to qualify for the Olympics, but the next year he went to Little Rock, regularly bringing Quigley two to five dollars until he repaid the money.

At Georgia Tech, Hamm won the Southeast Conference championship (now the Southeastern Conference) in 100 yd and 220 yd sprints and the long jump three years straight. In 1928, he broke the SEC record in the long jump with a leap of 25 feet 6 3/4 inches (7.791 m), won the National Intercollegiate meet, and broke the world record in the 1928 Olympic trials with a jump of 25 feet 11 1/2 inches (7.912 m).

On July 31, at the 1928 Olympics in Amsterdam, Holland, Hamm broke the Olympic record and won a gold medal with a leap of 25 feet 4 3/4 inches (7.741 m). After the Olympics, he was part of a track and field team that toured England and Germany. He won the long jump in every meet.

Hamm graduated from Georgia Tech in 1928, served as the school's track coach for a few years, and then spent the rest of his life in private business, much of it as an executive with The Coca-Cola Company on the West Coast and in Alaska. He was married three times, and died in June 1982 in Oregon. His ashes were scattered over his beloved Clear Lake in Oregon's Willamette National Forest, where he had fished many times. He was inducted into the Arkansas Sports Hall of Fame in 1971, and the Arkansas Track and Field Hall of Fame in 1996.

Hamm donated his trophies to Georgia Tech in 1970 which were displayed in the Student Center on campus.
