= Maybelle Reichardt =

American discus thrower (1907–1999)

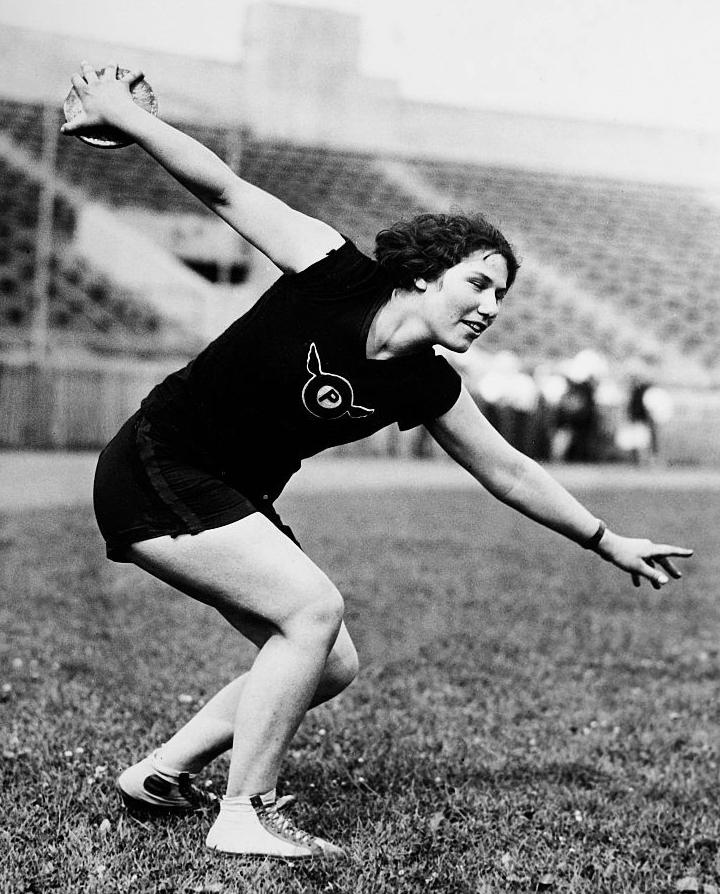
- Reichardt in 1928

Personal information
- Born: May 27, 1907 Los Angeles, California, U.S.
- Died: November 4, 1999 (aged 92) Pasadena, California, U.S.
- Education: Pasadena City College
- Height: 173 cm (5 ft 8 in)
- Weight: 63 kg (139 lb)

Sport
- Sport: Athletics
- Event: Discus throw
- Club: Pasadena Athletic and Country Club

Achievements and titles
- Personal best: 35.58 m (1928)

Maybelle Reichardt (later Hopkins, May 27, 1907 – November 4, 1999) was an American discus thrower who won the AAU Championship in 1925 and 1928. In 1928 she also set a national record and placed seventh at the Olympics in Amsterdam, Netherlands. Besides athletics, Reichardt won a national basketball title with the Los Angeles Athletic Club in 1926. She later worked as a registered nurse, got married, and had two sons; both sons became college professors.
