= Catherine Maguire =

American high jumper

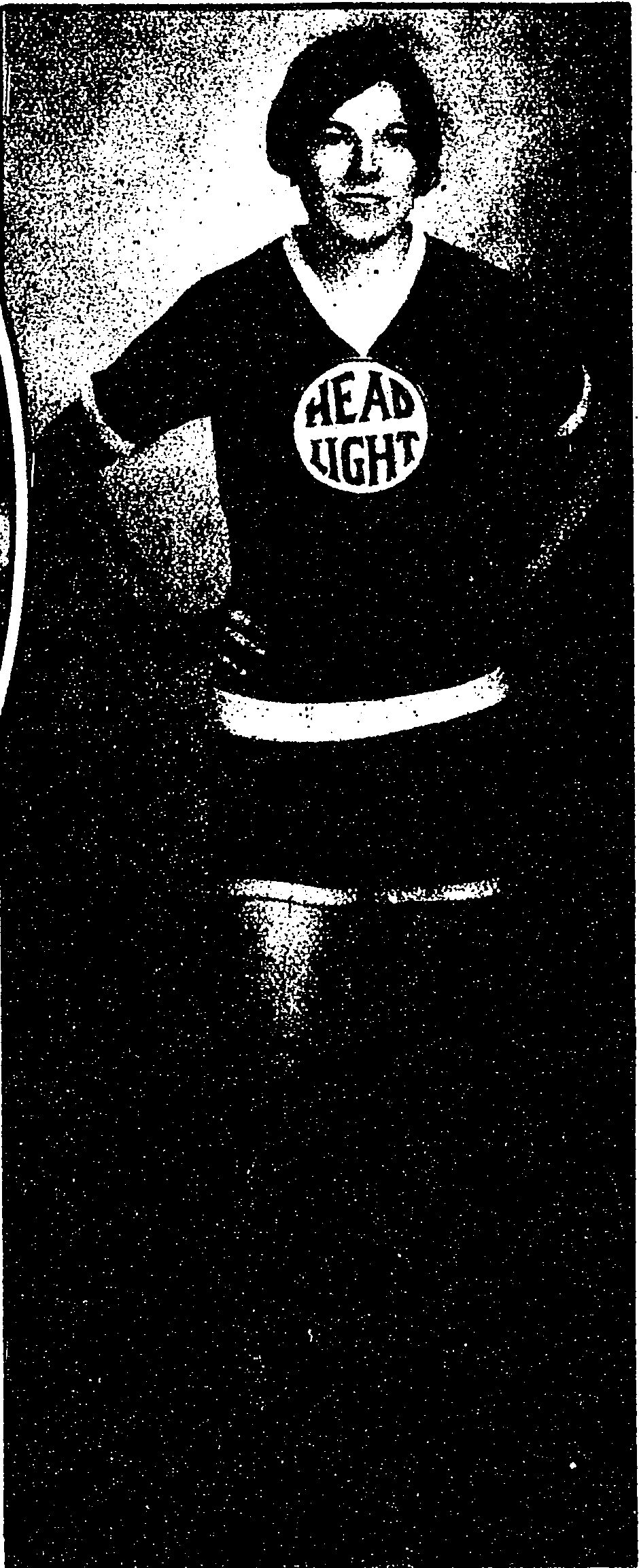
Maguire in 1928

Catherine Maguire (later Horsfall, February 4, 1906 – April 1991) was an American track and field athlete who competed in the 1928 Summer Olympics, finishing eighth in the women's high jump event.

She was born in Pacific, Missouri. She was a member of the Headlight Athletic Team in St. Louis, Missouri.
