= Lillian Copeland =

American athlete (1904–1964)

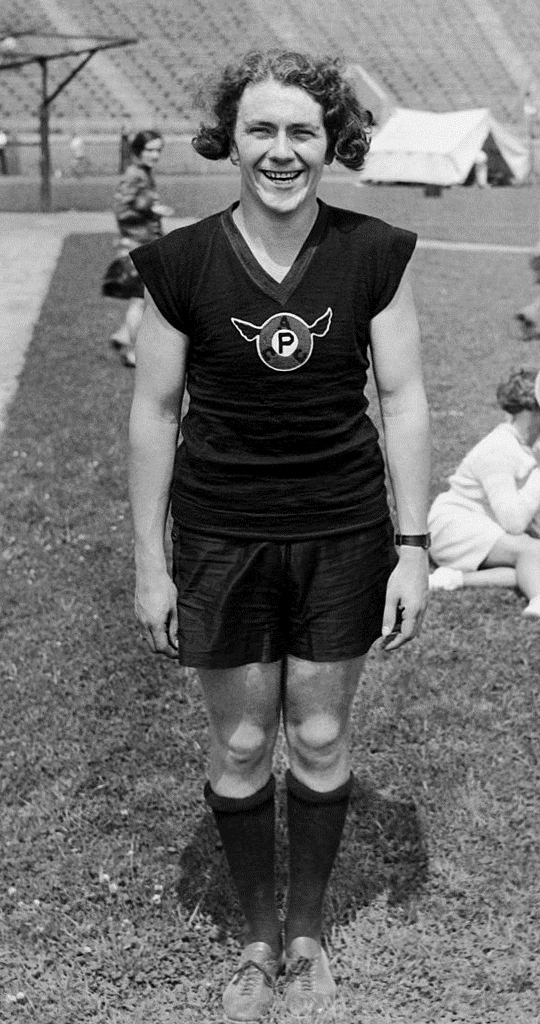
- Lillian Copeland in 1938

Personal information
- Born: Lillian Drossin; November 24, 1904 New York City, U.S.
- Died: July 7, 1964 (aged 59) Los Angeles, California, U.S.
- Education: University of Southern California (1930); University of Southern California Law School
- Employer: Los Angeles Sheriff's Department
- Height: 1.65 m (5 ft 5 in)
- Weight: 59 kg (130 lb)

Sport
- Sport: Athletics
- Events: Discus throw, shot put, javelin throw
- Club: Los Angeles Athletic Club, Los Angeles

Achievements and titles
- National finals: AAU shot put champion (1924–28, 1931); AAU discus throw champion (1926 and 1927); AAU javelin throw champion (1926 and 1931)
- Highest world ranking: world champion; multiple times
- Personal bests: DT – 40.58 m (1932); SP – 9.38 m (1925); JT – 38.21 m (1927)
Medal record
Representing the United States
Olympic Games
Gold medal – first place	1932 Los Angeles	Discus throw
Silver medal – second place	1928 Amsterdam	Discus throw
Maccabiah Games
Gold medal – first place	1935 Mandatory Palestine	Discus throw
Gold medal – first place	1935 Mandatory Palestine	Javelin throw
Gold medal – first place	1935 Mandatory Palestine	Shot put

Lillian Copeland, née Lillian Drossin, (November 24, 1904 – July 7, 1964) was an American track and field Olympic champion athlete, who excelled in discus, javelin throwing, and shot put, setting multiple world records. She has been called "the most successful female discus thrower in U.S. history". She also held multiple titles in shot put and javelin throwing. She won a silver medal in discus at the 1928 Summer Olympics, a gold medal in discus at the 1932 Summer Olympics, and gold medals in discus, javelin, and shot put at the 1935 Maccabiah Games in Mandatory Palestine.

In 1928, The New York Times reported that Copeland was "considered by many the all around best woman athlete in the country." Until the 2008 Beijing Games 74 years after she became an Olympic champion, she was the only American woman to win the discus throw at a modern Olympics. She has been inducted into the USATF Hall of Fame, the Helms Athletic Hall of Fame, the International Jewish Sports Hall of Fame, and the Southern California Jewish Sports Hall of Fame.

== Early and personal life ==
Copeland was born Lillian Drossin to Polish-Jewish immigrants in New York City. Her mother was from Grodno (now in Belarus). Her father died when she was young, and after her mother remarried they moved to Los Angeles, California, and changed their surnames to Copeland. Her stepfather was Abraham Copeland, the manager of a fruit and produce company. She lived in Boyle Heights, Los Angeles, and later in Pasadena, California, and attended Los Angeles High School, graduating in 1923.

She attended the University of Southern California, where she was a member of the Xi chapter of Alpha Epsilon Phi sorority and joined the track & field team in 1924. While at USC, she won every track event she entered. She had a role as a basketball player in the silent 1927 comedy film The Fair Co-Ed. She received a BA degree in political science in 1928. She was the first Olympian who was an alumna of Los Angeles High School and the University of Southern California.

== Athletic career ==
Copeland competed during the formative decades of women's competition in track and field. Consequently, her accomplishments are not fully reflected by the two Olympic medals she won in the discus throw. She competed first for the Pasadena Athletic and Country Club beginning in 1925, and from 1931 on for the Los Angeles Athletic Club. She also competed in running; in 1928 she was part of a women's relay team that set the US record in the quarter-mile. One of the track & field events in which she competed, which is no longer contested, was the baseball throw, in which she was second in the nation in 1926. She won nine Amateur Athletic Union (AAU) championships between 1925 and 1932. A feature article in the May 18, 1926, Pasadena Post noted that she "with all of her athletic prowess ... is very ... feminine in her conduct."

She excelled in all throwing events. She won the AAU shot put championships 5 times (1924–28, 1931). She also won the AAU discus throw title in 1926 (a year in which she set the world record; she began competing in discus because the shot put was not yet an Olympic event) and 1927, and set a new world record in the discus throw at the 1938 Olympic trials. In addition, she won the AAU javelin throw title in 1926 (setting a world record) and 1931. In the javelin, she broke the world record three times in 1926 and 1927. Between 1928 and 1931, she took a hiatus from competing, to focus on her law school studies.

In 1928, The New York Times reported that Copeland was "considered by many the all around best woman athlete in the country." Both Great Athletes in Olympic Sports (Salem Press; 2010), by Kjetil André Aamodt and Laura Flessel-Colovic, and the International Jewish Sports Hall of Fame report that she set the world record six times each in shot put, javelin, and discus from 1925–32.

=== Olympics ===
==== 1928 Olympics ====
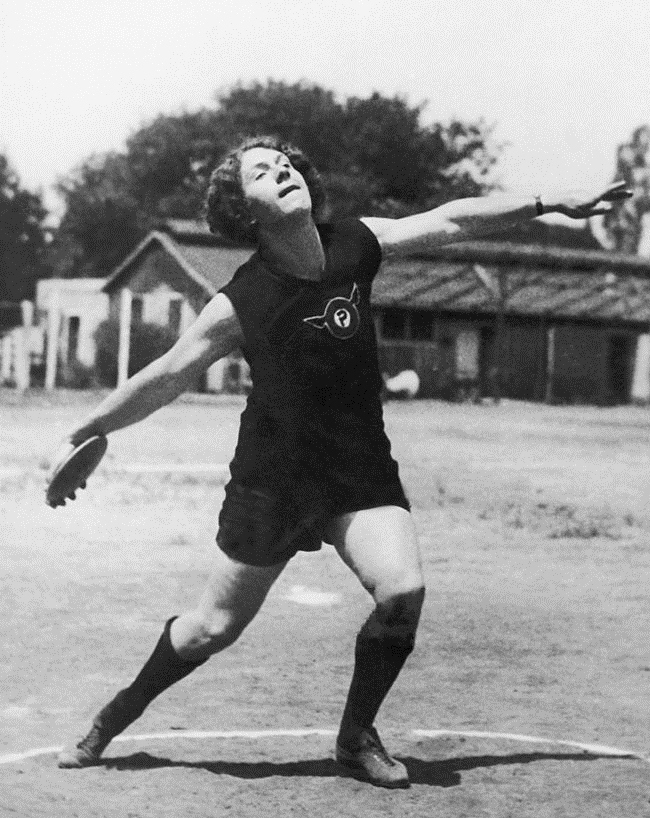
Copeland throwing the discus at the 1928 Summer Olympics

The 1928 Summer Olympics were the first Olympics to include women's track and field events. In weight throwing Copeland could only compete in the discus throw, because the javelin throw and shot put were not yet on the program (they would follow in 1932 and 1948, respectively).

She set a new world record in the discus throw at the Olympic trials, at 115 feet, 8.5 inches.

Prior to the Olympiad, in February 1928 she ran the lead leg in the 440-yard (400 m) relay in the 1928 Olympic trials. In so doing, she helped the US Women's team set a new record in the event of 50.0 seconds, and actually qualified for the Olympics in that event. Sources disagree, however, whether it was a world or US national record.

Once she arrived in Amsterdam, however, she only competed in the discus throw at the 1928 Olympics, where she finished second to Poland's Halina Konopacka, winning a silver medal. Inasmuch as it was the first time the event had been held, she was the sport's first Olympic silver medalist. Two weeks later, at a competition in Brussels, Belgium, she set a new world record in the shot put.

Returning to America, she attended and ultimately graduated from the University of Southern California Law School, and became less focused on sports for a number of years. Nevertheless, Copeland qualified for the US 1932 Olympic team for the discus throw.

==== 1932 Olympics ====
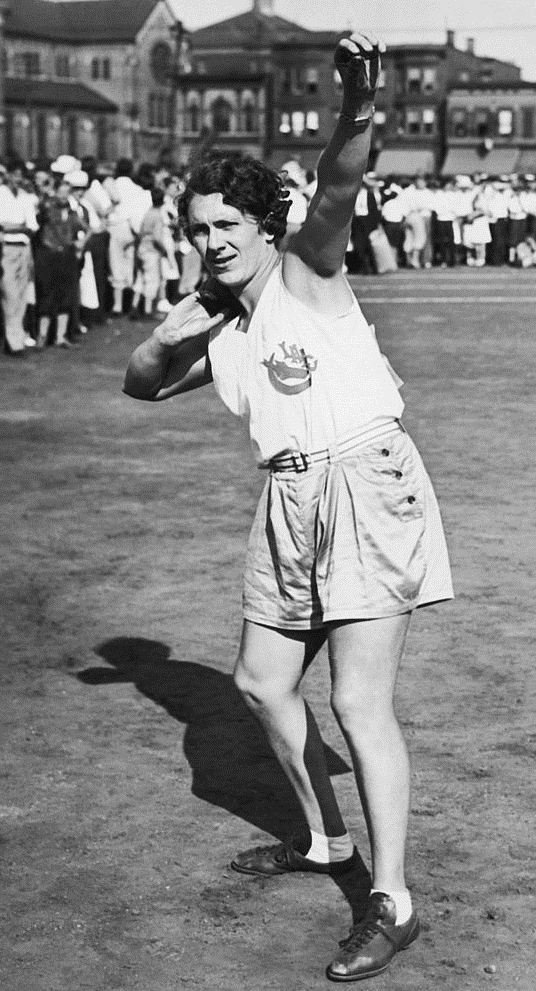
Training for the 1932 Summer Olympics

She competed in her home town in the 1932 Summer Olympics after beating out Babe Didrikson to qualify, and won the gold medal in the discus with her last throw. A Los Angeles Record reporter wrote: "Confident, calm and perfectly poised, [she] made a perfect throw." In doing so she also set a new Olympic record. That throw of 133.16 feet (40.59 m) was also a new world record. The 27-year-old Copeland was at the time the oldest American woman to have won an Olympic gold medal in a track & field event.

The shot put, which she excelled in, was not included in the women's events at the Olympic Games until 1948, depriving her of a chance to compete in it for additional Olympic medals.

==== 1936 Olympics ====
Although she had begun preparations to defend her Los Angeles gold medal at the 1936 Berlin Games in Nazi Germany, and was invited to compete for the United States at the Games, she ultimately chose to boycott them. Her plans to boycott the 1936 Olympic Games arose in 1933, just as the Nazi Party was obtaining more power. She was one of 24 former U.S. Olympic champions who petitioned the International Olympic Committee (IOC) in 1933 to move the Games from Germany. Copeland suggested that the situation of Nazi Germany was serious enough to warrant a change in location for the 1936 Olympics. She supported a reputed idea to substitute the location of the 1936 Games to Tokyo instead of Germany.As a Jew, she was strongly opposed to Adolf Hitler's edict barring Jews from the German Olympic team. She accused International Olympic Committee (IOC) president Avery Brundage of "deliberately concealing the truth" about Hitler and Nazi Germany. She also argued that Brundage had little respect for the harmful effects of Nazi Germany's intense regime on members of the Jewish community. Copeland raised awareness on the danger of ignoring religious and racial hatred perpetrated by Nazi Germany. She wanted people to know that the racial discrimination encouraged by members of Nazi Germany should not be overlooked, even in sports. The boycott movement fell through, however, and the 1936 Games proceeded in Germany.

=== Maccabiah Games ===
Copeland competed at the 1935 Maccabiah Games in Tel Aviv in Mandatory Palestine. There, she won the gold medals in her three events, the shot put, the javelin, and the discus throw.

=== Halls of fame ===
In view of her contributions to women's track and field, she was made a member of the USA Track & Field Hall of Fame, the Helms Athletic Hall of Fame, the International Jewish Sports Hall of Fame (1980), the Woman’s Track and Field Hall of Fame, and the Los Angeles High School Sports Hall of Fame (2010). In 1990 she was inducted into the Southern California Jewish Sports Hall of Fame.

== Later career ==
Copeland joined the Los Angeles Sheriff's Department in 1936, and worked there until she retired in 1960. At the Sheriff's Department, she worked in the Lennox and Firestone Juvenile divisions.

She died on July 7, 1964, in Los Angeles, at 59 years of age at Sunset Hospital after a lengthy illness. At the time of her death, she was one of only eight American women to have won an Olympic gold medal.

== See also ==
- List of Jews in track and field
- List of Olympic medalists in athletics (women)
- List of USA Outdoor Track and Field Championships winners (women)
