= Morgan Taylor =

American hurdler (1903–1975)

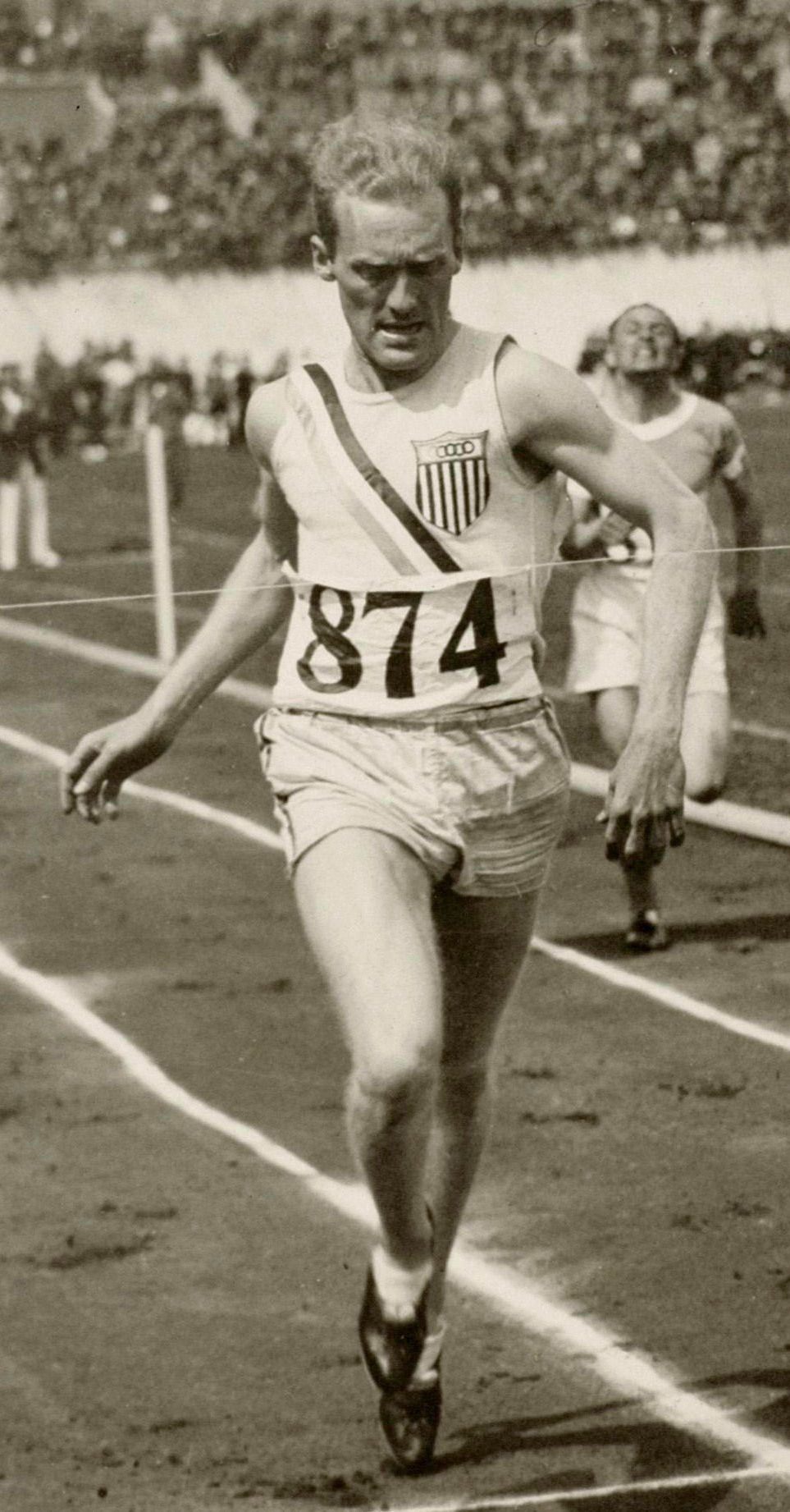
- Morgan Taylor at the 1928 Olympics

Personal information
- Full name: Frederick Morgan Taylor
- Born: April 17, 1903 Sioux City, Iowa, United States
- Died: February 16, 1975 (aged 71) Rochester, New York, United States
- Height: 1.85 m (6 ft 1 in)
- Weight: 75 kg (165 lb)

Sport
- Sport: Athletics
- Club: Illinois Athletic Club, Chicago
Medal record
Men's athletics
Representing the United States
Olympic Games
Gold medal – first place	1924 Paris	400 m hurdles
Bronze medal – third place	1928 Amsterdam	400 m hurdles
Bronze medal – third place	1932 Los Angeles	400 m hurdles

Frederick Morgan Taylor (April 17, 1903 – February 16, 1975) was an American hurdler and the first athlete to win three Olympic medals in the 400 m hurdles. He was the flag bearer for the United States at his last Olympics in 1932.

In 1924, Taylor won the 400 m Olympic trials with a world best time of 52.6 s, which was accepted as a national record, but not as a world record. While winning the gold medal at the 1924 Olympics he clocked the same time, but knocked one hurdle, and the record was again not ratified by the International Association of Athletics Federations (IAAF). In 1925, he won his second AAU title in the 440 yd hurdles in a world best time of 53.8 s, but this record was discounted too. Finally the IAAF accepted his 400 m record of 52.0 s set at the 1928 Olympic trials.

While studying at Grinnell College, Taylor competed in both track and field and football. He won the NCAA 220 yd hurdle title in 1927 and finished second in the long jump in 1925. After graduating he worked as a salesman for the Chicago Tribune and then as a teacher and athletics coach. His son F. Morgan Taylor Jr. also competed in track and field as a long jumper.

Olympic Games
Preceded by Billy Fiske	Flagbearer for the United States; Los Angeles 1932	Succeeded by Rolf Monsen
