= Johnny Gibson =

American athlete and coach (1905–2006)

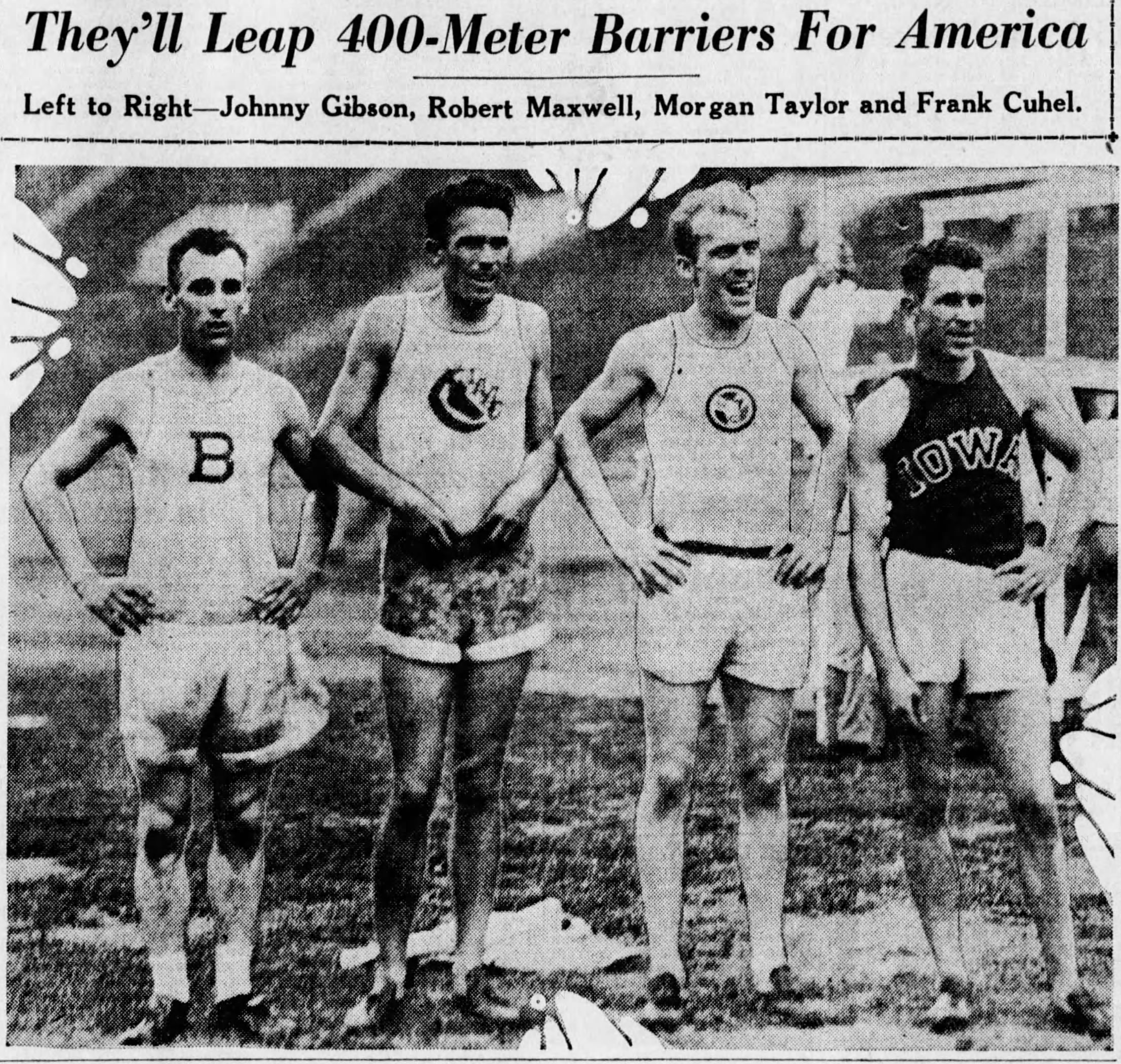
- American hurdlers Johnny Gibson, Robert Maxwell, Morgan Taylor, and Frank Cuhel at 400 m hurdles event in 1928 Olympics

Personal information
- Full name: Johnny Anthony Gibson
- Nationality: American
- Born: July 3, 1905 Greenwich Village, New York City, U. S.
- Died: December 29, 2006 (aged 101) Newton, New Jersey

Sport
- Sport: Long-distance running
- Event: 1928 Summer Olympics

John A. Gibson (July 3, 1905 – December 29, 2006) was a runner and Olympic athlete.

Gibson was born in New York City in 1905, but lived most of his life in Bloomfield, New Jersey, where he attended Bloomfield High School.

He was the head coach of men's track and field at Seton Hall University from 1945 to 1972. Gibson was a 1928 graduate of Fordham University, where he held the world record for the 440 yard hurdles. He was a member of the United States team at the 1928 Summer Olympics in Amsterdam, Netherlands, where he finished fourth in his semi-final and did not make the final. Along with his athletic and coaching careers, he was also a well known track and field official as a founding member of the New Jersey Track and Field Officials Association and he worked at college meets along the east coast as well as at the Millrose Games in Madison Square Garden. He was inducted into several halls of fame, including those of Fordham University, Seton Hall University, Helms Hall, N.J. Sports Authority, Garden State and Bloomfield. Mr. Gibson was married for 67 years to the late Dorothy Croughan. He died at the age of 101.
