= Elta Cartwright =

American sprinter

Personal information
- Born: December 21, 1907 Eureka, California, United States
- Died: November 29, 2001 (aged 93) Fortuna, California, United States

Sport
- Sport: Sprinting
- Event: 100 metres

Elta Cartwright (December 21, 1907 – November 29, 2001) was an American sprinter. She competed in the women's 100 metres at the 1928 Summer Olympics.
