= DeHart Hubbard =

American long jumper

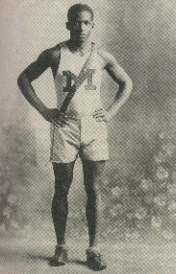
- Hubbard in 1924

Personal information
- Full name: William DeHart Hubbard
- Born: November 25, 1903 Cincinnati, Ohio, U.S.
- Died: June 23, 1976 (aged 72) Cleveland, Ohio, U.S.
Medal record
Men's athletics
Representing the United States
Olympic Games
Gold medal – first place	1924 Paris	Long jump

William DeHart Hubbard (November 25, 1903 – June 23, 1976) was a track and field athlete and the first African American to win an Olympic gold medal in an individual event. He won the running long jump at the 1924 Paris Summer games. He also competed in the 1924 Olympics as a triple jumper. The next year, he set a world record in the long jump, with a leap of 25 feet 10 7/8 inches (7.90 m) at Chicago in June 1925, and equaled the world record of 9.6 seconds for the 100-yard dash at Cincinnati, Ohio, a year later.

== High school and university ==
Hubbard excelled both athletically and academically at Walnut Hills High School in Cincinnati. Businessman Lon Barringer, a University of Michigan alumnus, learned of both achievements from newspaper articles. Impressed, he checked with University of Michigan Director of Athletics Fielding H. Yost, who had refused to allow African Americans to play football; Yost gave his enthusiastic approval to recruiting Hubbard. Barringer arranged an unusual plan to get Hubbard a scholarship to the school. The Cincinnati Enquirer was running a subscription contest; the ten high school students who signed up the most subscribers for the newspaper would each receive a $3000 scholarship. He promised Hubbard he would make every effort to help him win the contest. Barringer wrote to Michigan alumni across the country; Branch Rickey, who later broke the Major League Baseball color barrier by signing Jackie Robinson, was among the many who subscribed. Hubbard was one of the scholarship winners, and enrolled at Michigan in September 1921.

Hubbard remembered he was the only African American on the school's track team; he was also the first African American varsity track letterman at the university. In his college career, Hubbard was a three-time National Collegiate Athletic Association (NCAA) champion (1923 and 1925 outdoor long jump, 1925 100-yard dash), eight-time Amateur Athletic Union (AAU) champion (1922 and 1923 triple jump, 1922–1927 long jump) and seven-time Big Ten Conference champion in track and field (1923 and 1925 indoor 50-yard dash, 1923, 1924, and 1925 outdoor long jump, 1924 and 1925 outdoor 100-yard dash). His 1925 outdoor long jump of 25 feet 10 1/2 inches (7.89 m) stood as the Michigan Wolverines team record until 1980, and is still second. His 1925 jump of 25 feet 3 1/2 inches (7.71 m) stood as a Big Ten Championships record until Jesse Owens broke it in 1935 with what is now the current record of 26 feet 8 1/4 inches (8.13 m). In 1925, Hubbard broke the long jump world record with a leap of 25 feet 10 7/8 inches (7.90 m) at the NCAA championships. In 1927, he bettered that with a jump of 26 feet 2 1/4 inches (7.98 m) — which would have been the first ever over 26 feet (7.92 m) — but meet officials disallowed it, claiming that the take-off board was an inch higher than the surface of the landing pit. He also competed in the hurdles at the 1926 AAU championships. He graduated with honors in 1927.

== 1924 Olympic Games in Paris ==
Hubbard qualified for the Olympics in the broad jump and the triple jump. Camille Paddeu, a curator at the Musee municipal d'Art et d'Histoire in Colombes, the Paris suburb where the main stadium was located, confirmed Hubbard was not permitted to compete in some other events.) The United States Olympic team sailed from Hoboken, New Jersey, for France aboard the liner SS America. Before the ship left, he wrote in a letter to his mother, "I'm going to do my best to be the FIRST COLORED OLYMPIC CHAMPION." The team was housed in poor conditions at a chateau in Rocquencourt.

The night before he was to compete in the broad jump, Hubbard learned that fellow American Olympian Robert LeGendre (who had failed to qualify in the long jump, but did qualify in the pentathlon) had broken the long jump world record with a leap of 25 feet 6 inches (7.77 m) in the pentathlon. Hubbard was disturbed by the news, as surpassing the world record was his obsession. The competition took place on July 8. In his first attempt in the qualifying round, he not only fouled, he injured his right heel. On his second jump, he fell back upon landing, costing him over a foot of distance according to Hubbard. Due to his injury, he was unable to make any more attempts, but that was enough to take him into the final. In the final, he was unable to jump off his heel, instead having to do so off his toes, but on his final attempt he leaped 24 feet 6 inches (7.47 m), below his standards but good enough to win him the gold medal. Hubbard became the first African American to win an individual gold. (John Taylor ran for the winning 1600-meter relay team in the 1908 Summer Olympics in London.)

Hubbard did not qualify for the final of the triple jump, which took place four days later on July 12.

== 1928 Olympic Games in Amsterdam ==
Hubbard qualified in the broad jump, but was again injured and placed 11th.

== Post-athletic career ==
In 1934, Hubbard founded the Cincinnati Tigers baseball club as a member of the Indiana-Ohio League and Negro Southern League through 1936. In 1937, the Tigers joined the new Negro American League as a charter member for one year, which elevated the club to major league status. In its lone season as a major league team, the Tigers finished second with a record of 34 wins, 20 losses and a tie, ten games back of the Kansas City Monarchs.

After college graduation, he work as the supervisor of the Department of Colored Work for the Cincinnati Public Recreation Commission from 1927 to 1941. He then became the manager of Valley Homes, a public housing project in Cincinnati. In 1942, he moved to Cleveland, Ohio, and became a race relations adviser for the Federal Housing Authority (FHA). He retired from the FHA in 1969.

In 1956-1958, he was president of the National Bowling Association.

He died in Cleveland in 1976.

== Honors ==
In 1979, Hubbard was posthumously inducted into both the National Track and Field Hall of Fame and the University of Michigan Athletic Hall of Honor, the latter as part of the second class inducted.

He was a member of the Omega Psi Phi fraternity. In 2010, the Brothers of Omega Psi Phi, Incorporated, PHI Chapter established a scholarship fund honoring William DeHart Hubbard; the fund is endowed through the University of Michigan and donations can be forwarded to the University of Michigan, The William DeHart Hubbard Scholarship Fund.

== See also ==
- Timeline of African-American firsts
- George Poage, first African American to win an Olympic medal, two bronzes, in the 200-yard and 400-yard hurdles, in 1904 in St. Louis
