= 1956 United States Olympic trials (track and field) =

1956 United States Olympic track and field trials
- Dates: July 1–2 (men); August 25 (Women)
- Host city: Los Angeles (men); Washington, D.C. (women)
- Venue: Los Angeles Memorial Coliseum (men); American University (women)
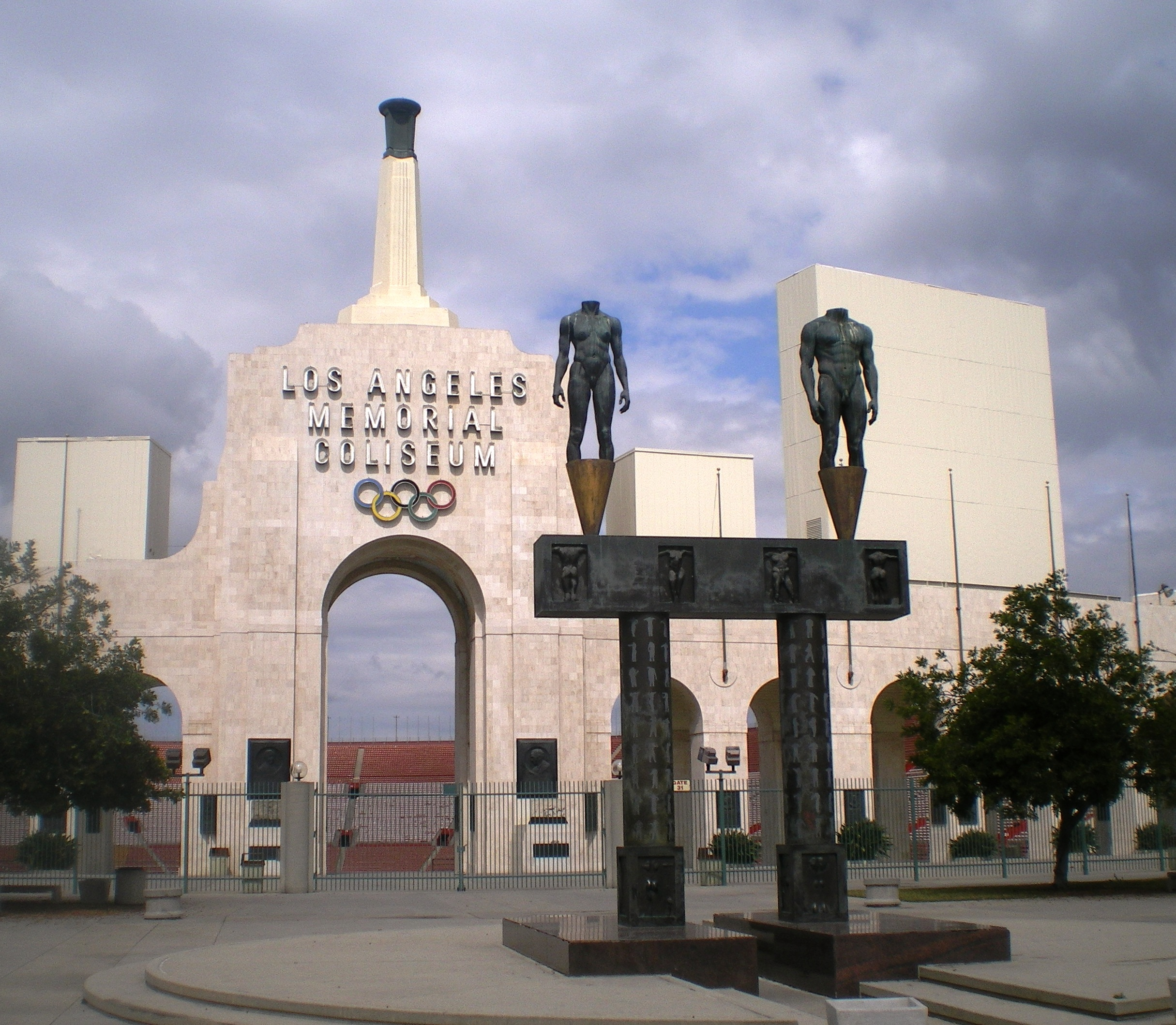
- Level: Senior
- Type: Outdoor

The men's 1956 United States Olympic trials for track and field for men were held at the Los Angeles Memorial Coliseum in Los Angeles, California, on June 28 and 29. The 20 kilometer walk trials were held in Pittsburgh, Pennsylvania, on August 26, and the 50 kilometer walk trials were held on September 16 in Baltimore, Maryland. Two marathon trials were held between two races, the AAU National Championships in Yonkers, New York, on September 30 and the Boston Marathon in Boston, Massachusetts, on April 19. As it turned out, the three selectees were the top 3 Americans at both events. The 10,000 meters was held in Bakersfield, California, on June 23.

The decathlon was held two weeks after the trials on July 13-4 in Crawfordsville, Indiana, allowing athletes to make attempts in individual events. Rafer Johnson qualified in the long jump but didn't jump in Melbourne. Bob Richards qualified in the Decathlon after winning the pole vault in his attempt to repeat as Olympic pole vault champion. He did compete in both events in Melbourne, successfully winning the pole vault, but after scoring in 11th place through nine events, he chose not to suffer through a 1500 and did not finish. The process was organized by the AAU.

The women's Olympic trials were held separately at American University (Reeves Field) in Washington, D.C., on August 25.

== Men's results ==
Key: ≠ Athlete without "A" standard, not selected.

=== Men track events ===
Event	Gold		Silver		Bronze	
100 meters	Bobby Morrow	10.3 (10.28)	Ira Murchison	10.4 (10.32)	Thane Baker	10.4 (10.36)
200 meters	Bobby Morrow	20.6 =WR	Thane Baker	20.7	Andy Stanfield	20.9
400 meters	Lou Jones	45.2 WR	Jim Lea	45.7	Charlie Jenkins	46.1
800 meters	Tom Courtney	1:46.4 NR	Arnie Sowell	1:46.9	Lon Spurrier	1:47.6
1500 meters	Jerome Walters	3:47.6	Ted Wheeler	3:48.0	Don Bowden	3:48.6
5000 meters	Bill Dellinger	14:26.0 NR	Curtis Stone	14:29.0	Max Truex	14:30.8
10,000 meters	Max Truex	30:52.0	Dick Hart	31:06.3	Gordon McKenzie	31:06.8
110 m hurdles	Jack Davis	13.8	Lee Calhoun	13.9	Joel Shankle	14.1
400 m hurdles	Glenn Davis	49.5 WR	Eddie Southern	49.7	Josh Culbreath	49.9
3000 m s'chase	Phil Coleman	9:00.3	Charles Jones	9:00.6	Horace Ashenfelter	9:02.4
20K racewalk	Alex Oakley Canada; James Hewson	1:39:06; 1:39:16	Henry Laskau	1:39:45	Bruce MacDonald	1:39:56
50K racewalk	Adolf Weinacker	4:38:58	Leo Sjogren	4:44:18	James Hewson	4:51:03
Boston Marathon	Antti Viskari Finland; John J. Kelley	2:14:14; 2:14:33	Eino Oskanen Finland; Nick Costes	2:17:56; 2:18:01	Dean Thackwray	2:20:24
Yonkers Marathon	John J. Kelley	2:24:52.2	Dean Thackwray	2:31:14	Nick Costes	2:31:52

=== Men field events ===
Event	Gold		Silver		Bronze	
High jump	Charles Dumas	2.15 m (7 ft 1/2 in)WR	Vern Wilson	2.07 m (6 ft 9 1/4 in)	Phil Reavis	2.07 m (6 ft 9 1/4 in)
Pole vault	Bob Richards	4.60 m (15 ft 1 in)	George Mattos	4.53 m (14 ft 10 1/4 in)	Jim Graham	4.48 m (14 ft 8 1/4 in)
Long jump	John Bennett; Greg Bell	7.83 m (25 ft 8 1/4 in); 7.83 m (25 ft 8 1/4 in)			Rafer Johnson	7.70 m (25 ft 3 in)
Triple jump	Ira Davis	15.66 m (51 ft 4 1/2 in) NR	George Shaw	15.23 m (49 ft 11 1/2 in)	Bill Sharpe	15.16 m (49 ft 8 3/4 in)
Shot put	Parry O'Brien	18.54 m (60 ft 9 3/4 in)	Ken Bantum	18.15 m (59 ft 6 1/2 in)	Bill Nieder	17.71 m (58 ft 1 in)
Discus throw	Fortune Gordien	57.21 m (187 ft 8 in)	Al Oerter	54.44 m (178 ft 7 in)	Ron Drummond	54.06 m (177 ft 4 in)
Hammer throw	Al Hall	60.24 m (197 ft 7 in)	Hal Connolly	60.03 m (196 ft 11 in)	Cliff Blair	59.91 m (196 ft 6 in)
Javelin throw	Cy Young	74.65 m (244 ft 10 in)	Phil Conley	74.40 m (244 ft 1 in)	Ben Garcia	71.45 m (234 ft 4 in)
Decathlon	Rafer Johnson	7755	Milt Campbell	7559	Bob Richards	7054

== Women's results ==
=== Women track events ===
Event	Gold		Silver		Bronze	
100 meters	Isabelle Daniels	11.5 =NR	Mae Faggs	11.6	Lucinda Williams	11.7
200 meters	Mae Faggs	24.2	Wilma Rudolph	24.2	Meredith Ellis	25.2
80 m hurdles	Barbara Mueller	11.9	Constance Darnowski	12.0	Irene Robertson	12.1

=== Women field events ===
Event	Gold		Silver		Bronze	
High jump	Mildred McDaniel	1.63 m (5 ft 4 in)	Anne Flynn	1.55 m (5 ft 1 in)	Verneda Thomas	1.53 m (5 ft 0 in)
Long jump	Margaret Matthews	6.02 m (19 ft 9 in)NR	Willye White	5.88 m (19 ft 3 1/4 in)	Joan Wolski	5.49 m (18 ft 0 in)
Shot put	Earlene Brown	14.26 m (46 ft 9 1/4 in)NR	Lois Testa	13.88 m (45 ft 6 1/4 in)	Paula Deubel	12.75 m (41 ft 9 3/4 in)
Discus throw	Earlene Brown	44.31 m (145 ft 4 in) NR	Pamela Kurrell	43.78 m (143 ft 7 in)	Marjorie Larney	43.40 m (142 ft 4 in)
Javelin throw	Karen Anderson	46.75 m (153 ft 4 in)	Marjorie Larney	43.78 m (143 ft 7 in)	Amelia Wershoven	43.79 m (143 ft 8 in)
