= 1952 United States Olympic trials (track and field) =

1952 United States Olympic track and field trials
- Dates: July 1-2
- Host city: Los Angeles, United States
- Venue: Los Angeles Memorial Coliseum
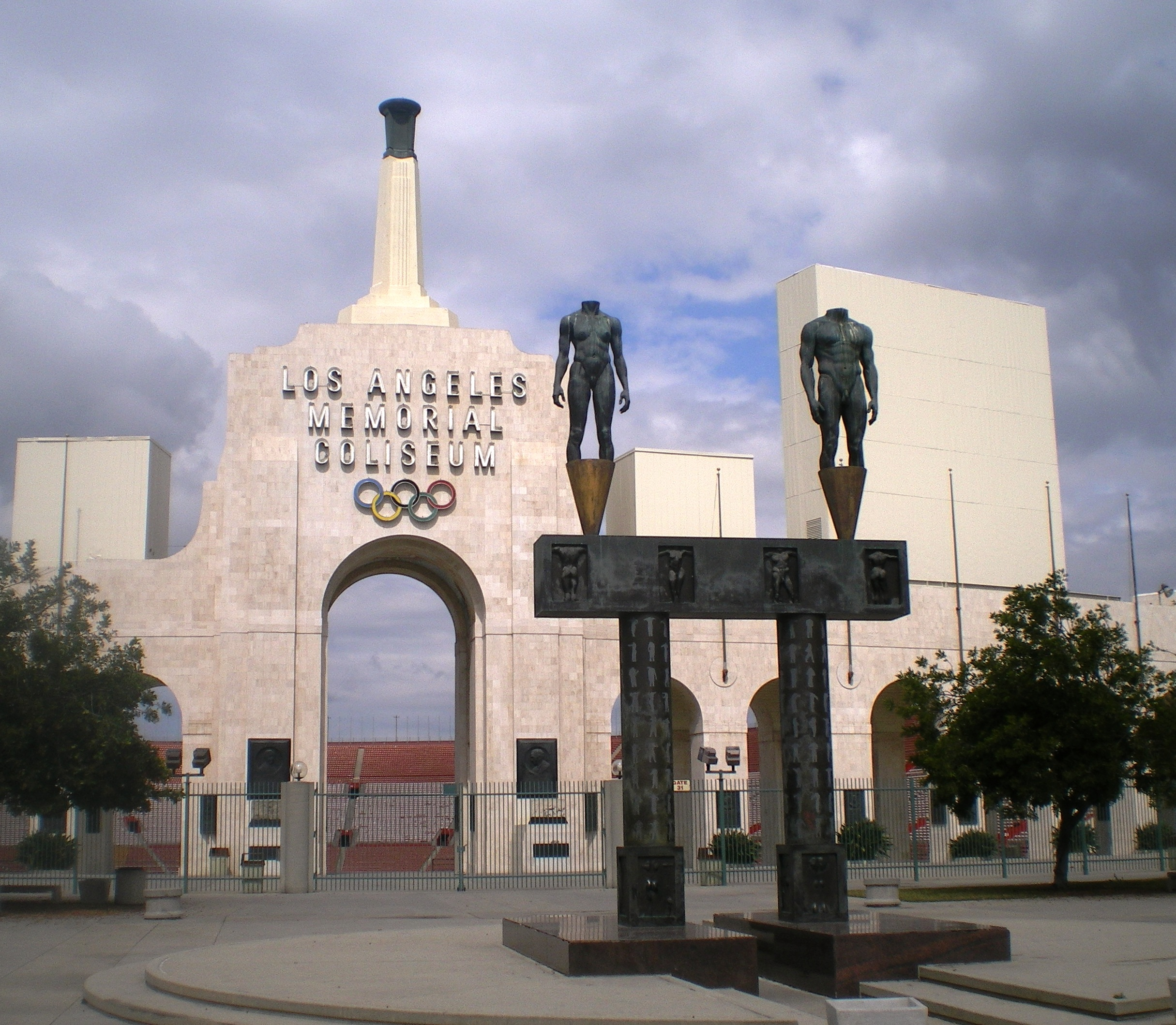
- Level: Senior
- Type: Outdoor

The men's 1952 United States Olympic trials for track and field were held at the Los Angeles Memorial Coliseum in Los Angeles, California, on June 27 and 28. The 10 kilometer walk trials were held in New York City on June 1, and the 50 kilometer walk trials were held on May 4 in Baltimore, Maryland. Three marathon trials were held between two races, the AAU National Championships in Yonkers, New York for both 1951 and 1952, on May 27, 1951 and May 18, 1952 and the Boston Marathon in Boston, Massachusetts, on April 19. Victor Dyrgall and Tom Jones finished 1–2 at both 1952 races to win selection. 1951's second placer John Lafferty was selected after finishing fifth in the same race in 1952. The 10,000 meters was held in Long Beach, California on June 20.

The decathlon was held a week after the trials on July 1-2 at the hometown track of the defending Olympic champion, Bob Mathias in Tulare, California.

The Women's Olympic trials were held separately in Harrisburg, Pennsylvania on July 1. The women's events didn't even record non-winning times. The women threw the American sized 8 Lb. implement. The process was organized by the AAU.

== Men's results ==
Key: ≠ Athlete without "A" standard, not selected.

=== Men track events ===
Event	Gold		Silver		Bronze	
100 meters	Art Bragg	10.5	Lindy Remigino	10.6	Dean Smith; Jim Gathers	10.6
200 meters	Andy Stanfield	20.6 =WR	Thane Baker	20.9	Jim Gathers	20.9
400 meters	Mal Whitfield	46.9	Eugene Cole	47.1	Ollie Matson	47.3
800 meters	Mal Whitfield	1:48.6	John Barnes	1:50.6	Reggie Pearman	1:50.6
1500 meters	Bob McMillen	3:49.3	Warren Druetzler	3:50.8	Javier Montes	3:51.1
5000 meters	Curtis Stone	14:27.0	Wes Santee	14:32.0	Charlie Capozzoli	14:43.9
10,000 meters	Curtis Stone	30:33.4	Fred Wilt	30:40.9	Horace Ashenfelter	30:45.8
110 m hurdles	Harrison Dillard	14.0	Jack Davis	14.1	Art Barnard	14.2
400 m hurdles	Charles Moore	50.7	Dewey Lee Yoder	51.3	Roland Blackman	51.6
3000 m s'chase	Horace Ashenfelter	9:06.4 NR	Bill Ashenfelter	9:07.1	Browning Ross	9:08.3
10K racewalk	Henry Laskau	47:45	Frank LaMorte	50:13	Price King	51:39
50K racewalk	Leo Sjogren	4:46:52	Adolf Weinacker	4:47:02	John Deni	4:48:40
1951 Yonkers Marathon	Jesse van Zant	2:37:12.5	John Lafferty	2:37:36	Walter Fedorick	2:40:02
Boston Marathon	Dorento Flores Guatemala; Victor Dyrgall	2:31:53; 2:36:40	Luis Velásquez (runner) Guatemala; Tom Jones	2:40:08; 2:43:29	Norman Tamanaha	2:51:55
1952 Yonkers Marathon	Victor Dyrgall	2:38:28.4	Tom Jones	2:42:22.2	Ted Corbitt	2:43:23

=== Men field events ===
Event	Gold		Silver		Bronze	
High jump	Walter Davis	6 ft 9 in (2.05 m)	Ken Wiesner	6 ft 7 3/4 in (2.02 m)	Arnold Betton	6 ft 6875 in (176.45 m)
Pole vault	Bob Richards	4.48 m (14 ft 8 1/4 in)	Don Laz	4.40 m (14 ft 5 in)	George Mattos	4.40 m (14 ft 5 in)
Long jump	Jerome Biffle	7.73 m (25 ft 4 1/4 in)	Meredith Gourdine	7.67 m (25 ft 1 3/4 in)	George Brown	7.66 m (25 ft 1 1/2 in)
Triple jump	George Shaw	15.38 m (50 ft 5 1/2 in)	Jim Gerhardt	15.13 m (49 ft 7 1/2 in)	Walter Ashbaugh	15.11 m (49 ft 6 3/4 in)
Shot put	Darrow Hooper	17.41 m (57 ft 1 1/4 in)	Parry O'Brien	17.38 m (57 ft 1/4 in)	Jim Fuchs	17.36 m (56 ft 11 1/4 in)
Discus throw	Sim Iness	53.29 m (174 ft 10 in)	Fortune Gordien	52.87 m (173 ft 5 in)	Jim Dillion	52.78 m (173 ft 1 in)
Hammer throw	Martin Engel	55.60 m (182 ft 4 in)	Samuel Felton	55.47 m (181 ft 11 in)	Bob Backus	53.66 m (176 ft 0 in)
Javelin throw	Bill Miller	71.84 m (235 ft 8 in)	Cy Young	71.37 m (234 ft 1 in)	Franklin "Bud" Held	68.34 m (224 ft 2 in)
Decathlon	Bob Mathias	7829	Milt Campbell	7055	Floyd Simmons	6804

== Women's results ==
=== Women track events ===
Event	Gold		Silver	Bronze
100 meters	Mae Faggs	12.1	Janet Moreau	Catherine Hardy
200 meters	Catherine Hardy	24.3	Mae Faggs	Dolores Dwyer
80 m hurdles	Constance Darnowski	11.8	Teresa Manuel	Caroline McDermott

=== Women field events ===
Event	Gold		Silver		Bronze	
High jump	Ora Lee Allen	1.52 m (4 ft 11 3/4 in)	Loita Mauer	1.47 m (4 ft 9 3/4 in)	Marion Boos	1.47 m (4 ft 9 3/4 in)
Long jump	Mabel Landry	5.56 m (18 ft 2 3/4 in)	Joan Wolski	5.00 m (16 ft 4 3/4 in)	Nancy Phillips	4.88 m (16 ft 0 in)
Shot put (8 Lb.)	Janet Dicks	12.89 m (42 ft 3 1/4 in)	Amelia Bert	12.82 m (42 ft 1/2 in)	Doris Sutter	11.34 m (37 ft 2 1/4 in)
Discus throw	Janet Dicks	33.00 m (108 ft 3 in)	Marjorie Larney	32.63 m (107 ft 0 in)	Amelia Bert	32.49 m (106 ft 7 in)
Javelin throw	Marjorie Larney	40.73 m (133 ft 7 in)	Amelia Bert	37.80 m (124 ft 0 in)	Janet Dicks	35.69 m (117 ft 1 in)
