= United States Olympic trials (track and field) =

United States Olympic trials for track and field

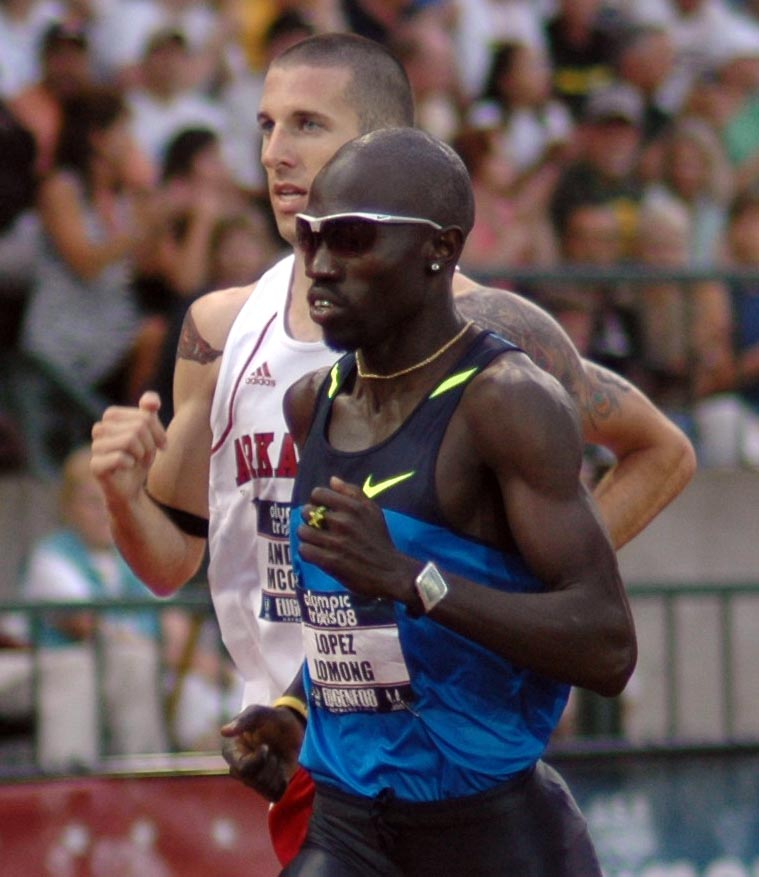
Lopez Lomong and Andy McClary at the 2008 Olympic trials in Eugene

The United States Olympic trials for the sport of track and field is the quadrennial meet to select the United States representatives at the Olympic Games. Since 1992, the meet has also served as the year's USA Outdoor Track and Field Championships. Because of the depth of competition in some events, this has been considered by many to be the best track meet in the world. The event is regularly shown on domestic U.S. television and covered by a thousand members of the worldwide media. As with all Olympic sports, the meet is conducted by the national governing body for the sport, currently USA Track & Field (USATF), which was previously named The Athletics Congress (TAC) until 1992. Previous to the formation of TAC in 1979, the national governing body for most sports was the Amateur Athletic Union (AAU).

== Standards ==
All countries are allowed to enter a maximum of three athletes into any of the track and field events in the Olympics, provided all three athletes have achieved a verifiable "A" standard performance. A country may enter one athlete in an event having achieved a "B" standard. Or, insignificant to the U.S. team, a country is allowed one single entry if it has no athletes who have achieved a "B" standard. The standards are published well in advance of the meet and provides approximately a year and a half long window for the athletes to achieve such a mark in a verifiable meet. These were the standards for 2008. These were the standards for the 2012 Olympics and these were the standards in 2016.

Entry to the United States Olympic trials is open to any U.S. Citizen who has achieved the "A" standard, and based on superior performance, sufficient "B" standard athletes to fill out the field. Since 1972 there have been a minimum of 24 entries in any event, with the popular sprint events 100 meters, 200 meters, 400 meters and 110 meter hurdles having a minimum of 32 entries. Since 1992, athletes achieving the "A" standard are funded to attend the Olympic trials, while "B" standard athletes have to pay their own way to the meet.

Unlike many other countries, who have a selection committee, the selection to the United States Olympic Team is exclusively by results on the track. It's "do or die" in the prescribed event. If two or more athletes in an event final have met the "A" standard by the end of that event in the trials, then the top three who have met the "A" standard, based on their placement in the trials (finalists, in order of finish, then semi-finalists, in order of semi-final time/distance, then preliminary rounds, in order of best preliminary round time/distance), are on the Olympic team, with the fourth-best placement among those meeting the "A" standard being an alternate. If fewer than two athletes in an event final have met the "A" standard, then the best finisher in the trials who has met the "B" standard is on the Olympic team, with the second-best being an alternate. Should no athletes who competed in an event meet the "B" standard, USA sends no athletes in that event to the Olympics.

== History ==
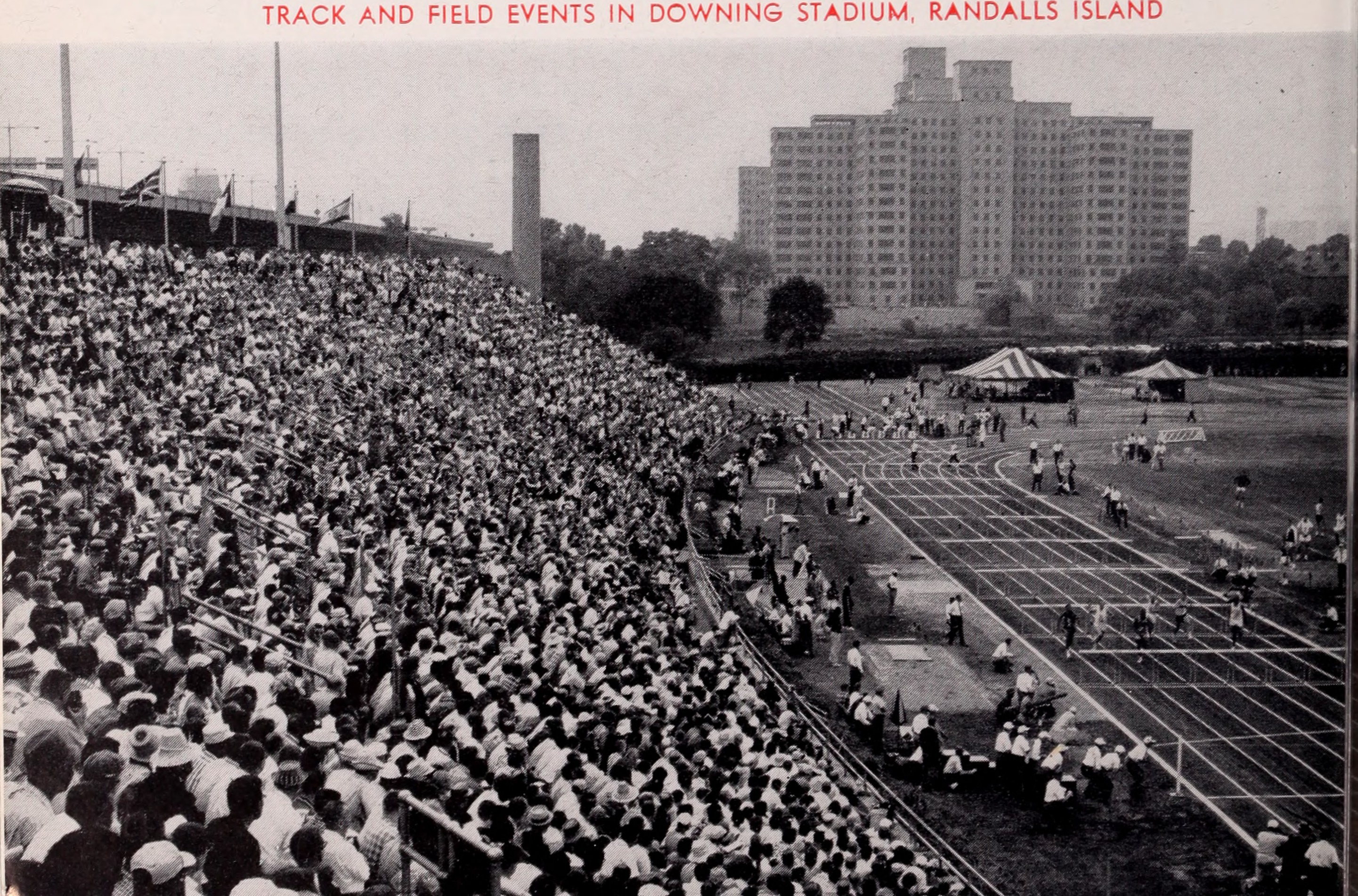
The 1964 U.S. Olympic trials for track and field at Downing Stadium in Randalls Island, New York City

Prior to 1908, members of the United States Olympic team were selected without trials. The 1908 and 1912 teams were selected based on regional trials, though the Eastern trials were favored. There were no Olympic trials in 1916 due to World War I, nor in 1940 and 1944 due to World War II, though Olympic marathon team members were named in 1940. The men's trials in 1968 were held at high elevation in northern California at Echo Summit, south of Lake Tahoe; the venue was chosen to replicate the conditions found in Mexico City, site of that year's Olympics and situated more than 7,000 feet above sea level.

Until 1972 the women's Olympic trials were held separately. Also until 1972, the men's Olympic trials conducted semi-final trials earlier in the season. Some events, including the Marathon and Racewalk frequently have separate Olympic trials. The 1980 Olympic team was named but did not participate due to the 1980 Olympic Boycott in protest of the Soviet invasion of Afghanistan declared by President Jimmy Carter.

=== 2020 Olympic trials held 2021 ===
United States Olympic & Paralympic Committee (USOPC), and the TrackTown USA Local Organizing Committee announced the release of the updated competition schedule for the 2020 U.S. Olympic Team trials – Track and Field, that will take place June 18-27, 2021, at Hayward Field in Eugene, Oregon.

== Venues ==
=== Combined Olympic trials ===
| Year | Location | Venue | Dates |
|---|---|---|---|
| 2024 | Eugene, Oregon | Hayward Field, University of Oregon | June 21–30, 2024 |
| 2020 | Eugene, Oregon | Hayward Field, University of Oregon | June 18–27, 2021 |
| 2016 | Eugene, Oregon | Hayward Field, University of Oregon | July 1–10, 2016 |
| 2012 | Eugene, Oregon | Hayward Field, University of Oregon | June 21 – July 1, 2012 |
| 2008 | Eugene, Oregon | Hayward Field, University of Oregon | June 27 – July 6, 2008 |
| 2004 | Sacramento, California | Hornet Stadium, California State University, Sacramento | July 9–18, 2004 |
| 2000 | Sacramento, California | Hornet Stadium, California State University, Sacramento | July 14–23, 2000 |
| 1996 | Atlanta | Centennial Olympic Stadium | June 14–23, 1996 |
| 1992 | New Orleans | Tad Gormley Stadium | June 19–28, 1992 |
| 1988 | Indianapolis | IU Michael A. Carroll Track & Soccer Stadium, IUPUI | July 15–23, 1988 |
| 1984 | Los Angeles | Los Angeles Memorial Coliseum | June 16–24, 1984 |
| 1980 | Eugene, Oregon | Hayward Field, University of Oregon | June 21–29, 1980 |
| 1976 | Eugene, Oregon | Hayward Field, University of Oregon | June 19–27, 1976 |

=== Men's Olympic trials ===
| Year | Location | Venue | Dates |
|---|---|---|---|
| 1972 | Eugene, Oregon | Hayward Field, University of Oregon | June 29 – July 11 |
| 1968 | Echo Summit trailhead, California | Nebelhorn ski area (temporary facility) | September 6–16 |
| 1964 | Los Angeles, California | Los Angeles Memorial Coliseum | September 12–13 |
| 1960 | Stanford, California | Stanford Stadium, Stanford University | July 1–2 |
| 1956 | Los Angeles | Los Angeles Memorial Coliseum | June 29–30 |
| 1952 | Los Angeles | Los Angeles Memorial Coliseum | July 27–28 |
| 1948 | Evanston, Illinois | Dyche Stadium, Northwestern University | July 9–10 |
| 1936 | Randall's Island, New York | Randall's Island Stadium | July 11–12 |
| 1932 | Stanford, California | Stanford Stadium, Stanford University | July 15–16 |
| 1928 | Cambridge, Massachusetts | Harvard Stadium, Harvard University | July 6–7 |
| 1924 | Cambridge, Massachusetts | Harvard Stadium, Harvard University | June 13–14 |
| 1920 | Cambridge, Massachusetts | Harvard Stadium, Harvard University | July 16–17 |

=== Women's Olympic trials ===
| Year | Location | Venue | Dates |
|---|---|---|---|
| 1972 | Frederick, Maryland | Governor Thomas Johnson High School | July 7–8 |
| 1968 | Walnut, California | Hilmer Lodge Stadium, Mount San Antonio College | August 24–25 |
| 1964 | Randall's Island, New York | Downing Stadium | August 6–8 |
| 1960 | Abilene, Texas | Elmer Gray Stadium, Abilene Christian University | July 15–16 |
| 1956 | Washington, D.C. | Reeves Field, American University | August 25 |
| 1952 | Harrisburg, Pennsylvania | Fager Field, William Penn High School (Harrisburg) | July 4 |
| 1948 | Providence, Rhode Island | Brown Stadium, Brown University | July 12 |
| 1936 | Providence, Rhode Island | Brown Stadium, Brown University | July 4 |
| 1932 | Evanston, Illinois | Dyche Stadium, Northwestern University | July 16 |
| 1928 | Newark, New Jersey | Newark Schools Stadium | July 4 |
