= 1948 United States Olympic trials (track and field) =

1948 United States men's Olympic trials
- Dates: July 9–10 (men); July 12 (women)
- Host city: Evanston, Illinois (men); Providence, Rhode Island (women)
- Venue: Dyche Stadium (men); Brown University stadium (women)
- Level: Senior
- Type: Outdoor

The 1948 United States Olympic trials for track and field determined qualification to represent the United States in athletics at the 1948 Summer Olympics. The men's events were held at Dyche Stadium on the campus of Northwestern University in Evanston, Illinois. The women's events were held two days later in Providence, Rhode Island. Organized by the Amateur Athletic Union (AAU), the men's competition lasted two days while the women's took place on one day.

== 1948 U.S. Olympic track and field trials results ==
=== Men ===
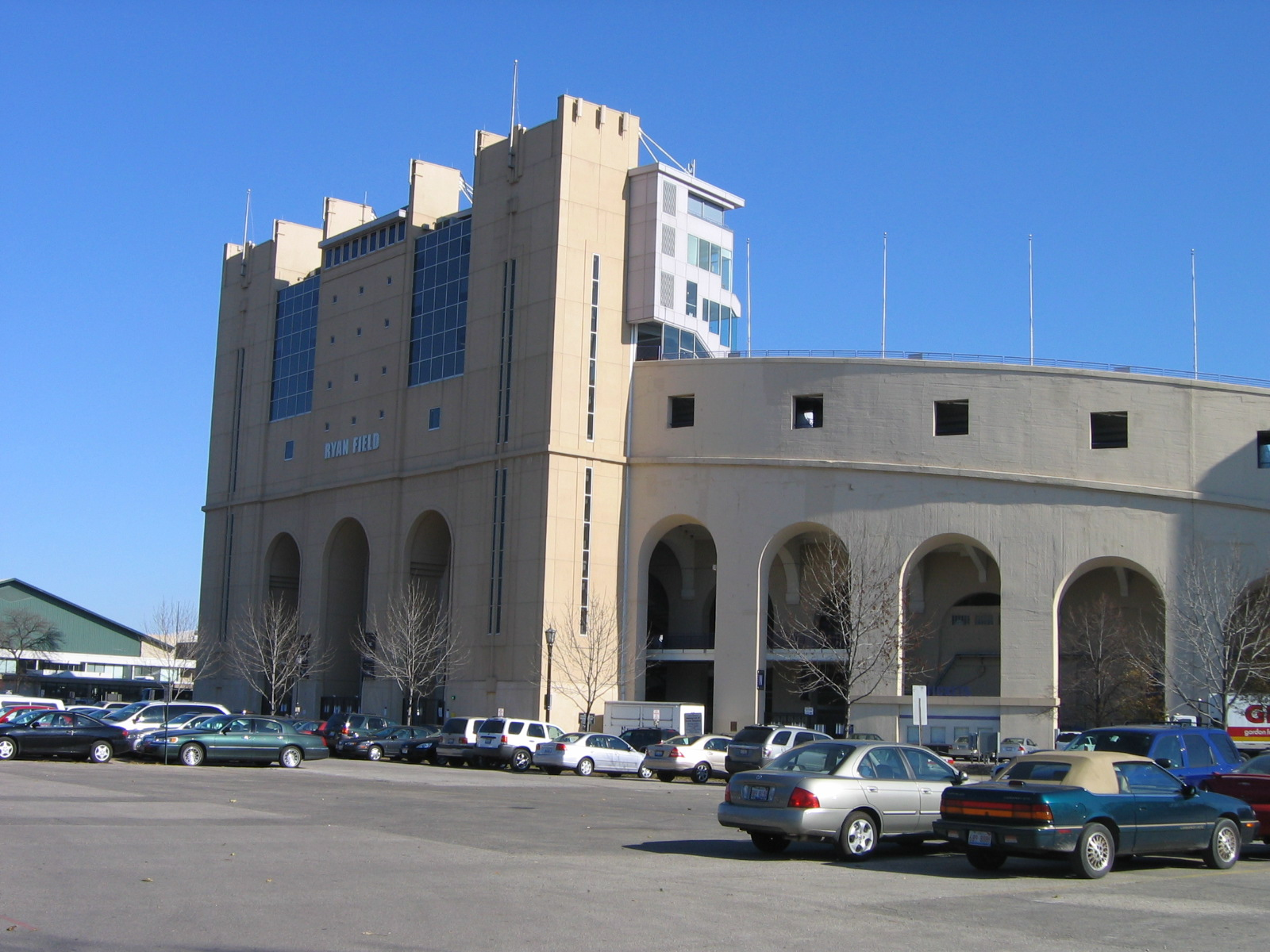
Dyche Stadium hosted the 1948 men's competition

Event	Gold		Silver		Bronze	
100 metres	Barney Ewell	10.2/10.33	Mel Patton	10.3/10.45	Harrison Dillard	10.4/10.50
200 meters	Mel Patton	20.7 =AR	Barney Ewell	20.7 =AR	Cliff Bourland	21.0
400 meters	Mal Whitfield	46.6/46.77	Dave Bolen	47.0/47.15	George Guida	47.2/47.35
800 meters	Mal Whitfield	1:50.6	Herb Barten	1:50.7	Robert Chambers	1:51.4
1500 meters	Don Gehrmann	3:52.2/41	Clem Eischen	3:52.5/62	Roland Sink	3:52.5/66
3000 meters steeplechase	Bob McMillen	9:18.7	Browning Ross	9:21.0	Whitey Overton	9:28.4
5000 meters	Curt Stone	14:40.7	Jerry Thompson	14:41.2	Clarence Robison	14:44.2
10000 meters	Eddie O'Toole	32:29.7	Fred Wilt	32:31.0	Herman Goffberg	33:10.0
50 kilometer walk	Ernest Crosbie	5:04:30	Adolf Weinacker	5:05:46	John Deni	5:05:48
110 meters hurdles	William Porter	13.9/13.90	Craig Dixon	14.1/14.11	Clyde Scott	14.2/14.18
400 meters hurdles	Roy Cochran	51.7/51.83	Dick Ault	51.8/51.96	Jeff Kirk	51.9/52.00
High jump	Vern McGrew	6'8 1/4" (2.038)	George Stanich	6'8 1/4" (2.038)	Dwight Eddleman	6'7 1/4" (2.013)
Pole vault	Boo Morcom	14'8 1/8" (4.47)	Guinn Smith	14'8 1/8" (4.47)	Bob Richards	14'6 1/8" (4.42)
Long jump	Willie Steele	26'2" (7.97) *	Herb Douglas	25'3" (7.69)	Lorenzo Wright	25'0 1/4" (7.62) *
Triple jump	Bill Albans	48'11 1/2" (14.92)	Erkki Koutonen	48'11 1/2" (14.92)	Bob Beckus	48'1 3/4" (14.67)
Shot put	Jim Delaney	55'1 3/4" (16.81)	Wilbur Thompson	54'11 7/8" (16.76)	Jim Fuchs	54'8 3/8" (16.67)
Discus throw	Fortune Gordien	166'2" (50.64) *	Vic Frank	165'10 3/4" (50.56)	William Burton	163'9" 3/4 (49.93) *
Hammer throw	Bob Bennett	177'8 1/2" (54.16)	Henry Dreyer	173'4 3/4" (52.84)	Samuel Felton	171'3 3/4" (52.21)
Javelin throw	Martin Biles	225'9" (68.81)	Bob Likins	222'3 1/2" (67.75)	Steve Seymour	218'9" (66.68)

=== Women ===
The women's Olympic trials were conducted on July 12 as a single day event in Providence, Rhode Island. It was considered horribly organized, or at least the women athletes were not accorded the same respect as the men in the sense that they had to conduct heats, semi-finals and finals all in the same day. Audrey Patterson ran five races that day to qualify in two events. Lillian Young ran three races and long jumped.

Event	Gold		Silver		Bronze	
100 meters	Mabel Walker	12.3	Audrey Patterson	12.4	Lillian Young	12.6
200 meters	Audrey Patterson	25.3	Nell Jackson	25.8	Mae Faggs	25.9
80 meters hurdles	Bernice Robinson	12.4	Nancy Phillips	12.4	Theresa Manuel	12.6
High jump	Alice Coachman	5'4 3/4" (1.644)	Bernice Robinson	5'1 3/4" (1.568)	Emma Reed	5'0 3/4" (1.543)
Long jump	Emma Reed	18'4 5/8" (5.60)	Lillian Young	17'9" 3/8 (5.42)	Nancy Phillips	17'5" (5.31)
Shot put	Frances Kaszubski	38'8 1/4" (11.79)	Dorothy Dodson	38'4 1/2" (11.70)	Ramona Harris	37'3 3/4" (11.38)
Discus throw	Frances Kaszubski	122'6 1/2" (37.33)	Dorothy Dodson	113'11" (34.31)	Pauline Ruppeldt	104'10 3/4 (31.96)
Javelin throw	Dorothy Dodson	140'4" (42.76)	Theresa Manuel	115'0" (34.64)	Bessie Leick	102'6" (31.24)
