= Wilbur Hutsell =

American college coach and administrator (1892–1980)

Biographical details
- Born: November 10, 1892; Moberly, Missouri, U.S.
- Died: December 8, 1980 (aged 88); Auburn, Alabama, U.S.

Playing career

Track and Field
- 1912–1914: Missouri

Coaching career (HC unless noted)

Track and Field
- 1921–1963: Auburn

Men's basketball
- 1921–1924: Auburn

Administrative career (AD unless noted)
- 1923–1925: Auburn
- 1947–1951: Auburn

Head coaching record
- Overall: 140–25 (.848) (track and field); 16–22 (.421) (men's basketball)

Accomplishments and honors

Championships
- 3x Southeastern Conference track and field champion (1954, 1955, 1961)

Wilbur Hall Hutsell (November 10, 1892 – December 8, 1980) was an American track and field coach who coached at Auburn University from 1921 to 1963. He also served two stints as the school's athletic director.

== Early life ==
Hustell was born in Moberly, Missouri on November 10, 1892. He attended the University of Missouri, where he was the Missouri Valley Conference 440-yard run champion in 1914. He was a student assistant coach for the Tigers from 1914 to 1915. He then served as track coach of the Missouri Athletic Association until 1917, when he entered the United States Army. He moved to Alabama in 1919 to become the physical education director and coach of the Birmingham Athletic Club.

== Auburn University ==
In 1921, Hutsell became Auburn University's first track and field coach. Over his career, he led the Tigers to a 140–25 dual meet record and three Southeastern Conference team championships. Four of his athletes, Euil Snider, Percy Beard, Whitey Overton, and James Dillion, competed in the Olympic Games. He was the head coach of Auburn's men's basketball team from 1921 to 1924 and compiled an overall record of 16–22. He was Auburn's athletic director from 1923 to 1925 and again from 1947 to 1951. Hutsell retired in 1963, but continued to assist his successor, Mel Rosen, on a voluntary basis. Rosen credited Hutsell with developing hurdler James Walker into an Olympian.

== Olympics ==
Hutsell was the trainer for the United States wrestling team at the 1924 Summer Olympics and an assistant track coach at the 1928 Summer Olympics.

== Honors ==
Hutsell was inducted into the Helms Athletic Foundation Hall of Fame in 1957, the Alabama Sports Hall of Fame in 1970, the National Track and Field Hall of Fame in 1975, and the Mizzou Hall of Fame in 1998.

In 1970, Auburn's new track stadium was named in honor of Hutsell. After major renovations in 2006, the facility was renamed the Hutsell-Rosen Track in honor both Hutsell and Mel Rosen.

== Death ==
Hutsell died on December 8, 1980, at his home in Auburn, Alabama. He was buried at Pine Hill Cemetery in Auburn.
