= Capozzoli =

Capozzoli is an Italian surname. Notable people with the surname include:

- Charlie Capozzoli (1931–2013), American long-distance runner
- Louis Capozzoli (1901–1982), American politician
- Marco Capozzoli (born 1988), American football placekicker
