= Icahn Stadium =

Track and field facility in Manhattan, New York

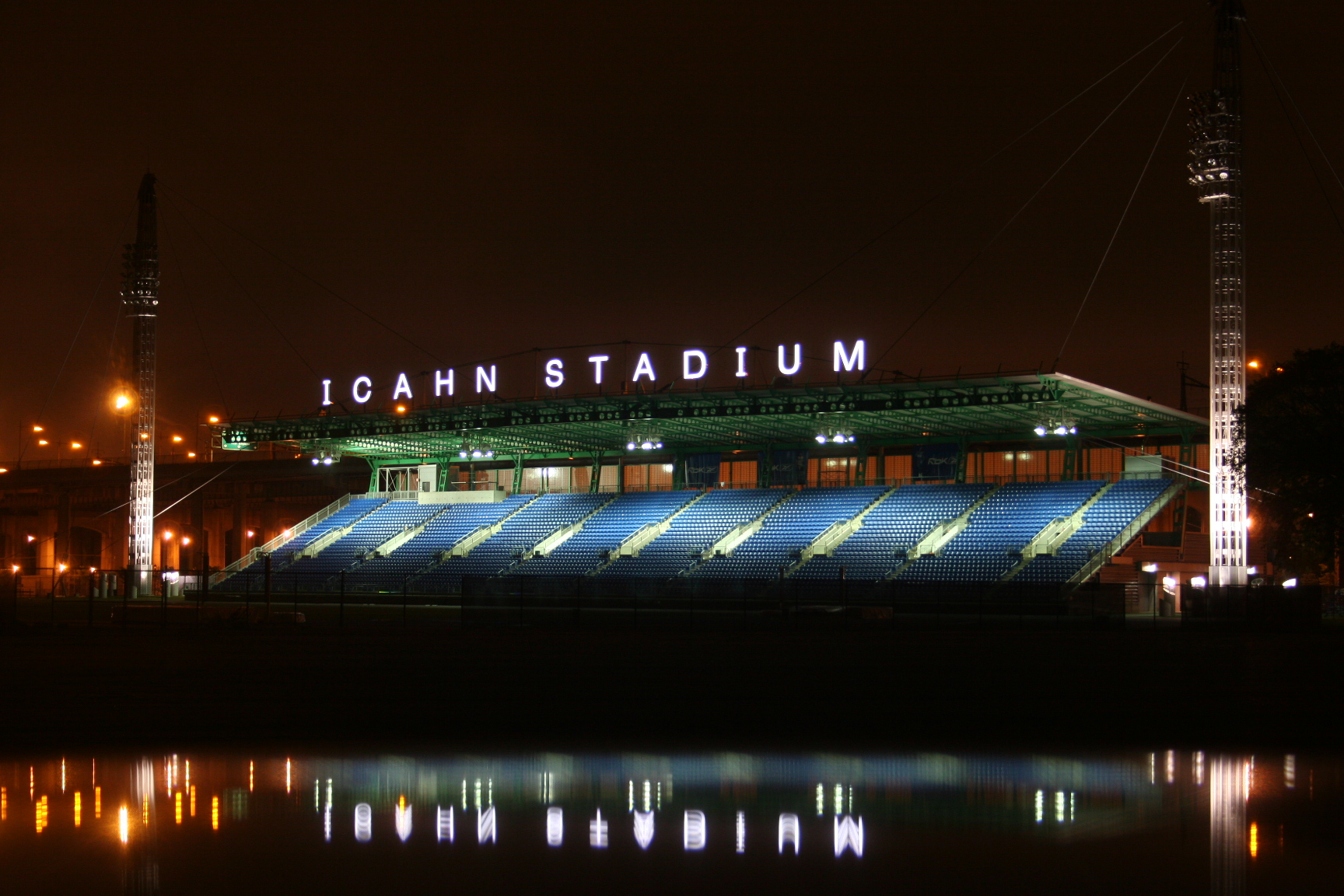
- Icahn Stadium, from across the Harlem River in Manhattan.
- Interactive map of Icahn Stadium
- Location: Randalls Island, Manhattan, New York City
- Coordinates: 40°47′35.90″N 73°55′31.23″W
- Owner: New York City Department of Parks and Recreation
- Operator: Randalls Island Park Alliance (RIPA)
- Capacity: 5,000
- Surface: Grass
- Public transit: M35/X80, MTA

Construction
- Opened: April 23, 2005
- Cost: $42 million
- Architects: RMJM, Zurita Architects
- Structural engineer: Geiger Engineers

Tenants
- Adidas Grand Prix (IAAF Diamond League) (2005–present); New York City FC II (MLS Next Pro) (2024–present, part-time)

Website
- randallsisland.org/visit/icahn-stadium/

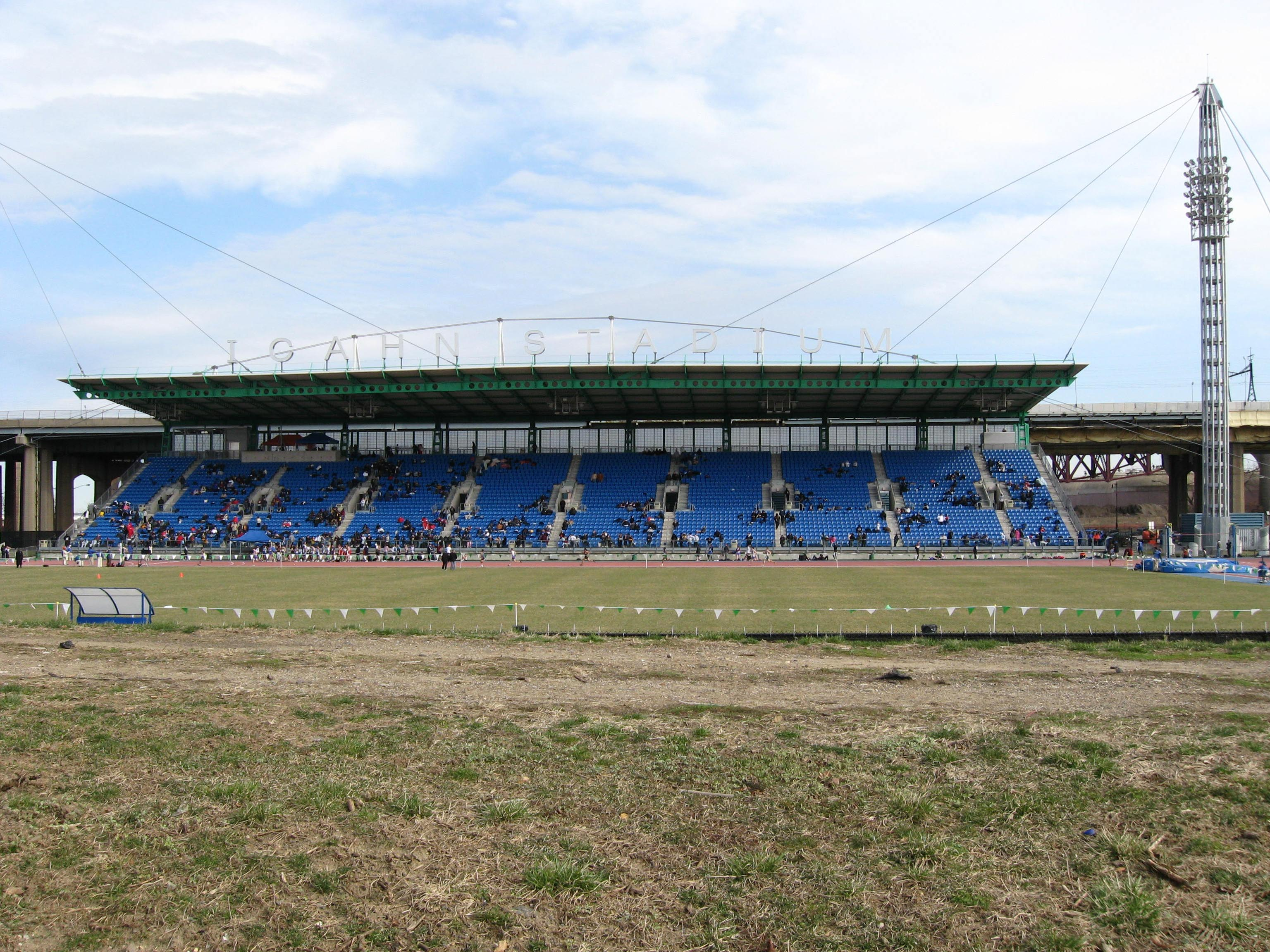
Icahn Stadium in daylight

Icahn Stadium is a 5,000-seat track and field multipurpose stadium facility located on Randalls Island in Manhattan, New York City. Designed within the former site of Downing Stadium, it opened on April 23, 2005. Icahn Stadium is named after American businessman Carl Icahn, who made a $10 million donation towards the construction of the new stadium. The stadium features a World Athletics Class 1 certified running track with a 400-meter Mondo Super X Performance surface, and it has been the site of many international, national, and regional track and field events.

== Background ==
Icahn Stadium was built to replace Downing Stadium, which was originally opened in 1936 as part of a larger New York City Parks project that included the construction of the Triborough Bridge. The opening of Downing Stadium made history as the facility hosted the U.S. Olympic Trials in 1936, at which Jesse Owens qualified for two events in the upcoming Berlin Olympics. Downing Stadium also made history in 1939 as the site of the first televised college football game, Fordham vs. Waynesburg. The site was subsequently home to the New York Cosmos soccer team, as well as various sporting events and summer concerts. The stadium lights, which had been taken from Ebbets Field after it was torn down, were left in place to light the new field.

After years of use, the old facility was in need of renovation. In order to maximize the potential of the site, the old stadium was razed, and Icahn Stadium was constructed in its place along with Field 10, a FIFA-certified soccer field, on the north side. The track and field built is one of only five International Association of Athletics Federations Class 1-certified tracks in the United States (along with Hutsell-Rosen Track, Hayward Field, John McDonnell Field and Rock Chalk Park ). The 5,000 seat stadium is partially sheltered by a cantilevered roof, and is illuminated by a pair of lighting towers. In addition, the soccer field on the north of the stadium is outfitted with a scoreboard, fencing, lighting, and bleachers for spectator events.

Run by the Randalls Island Park Alliance (RIPA), Icahn Stadium serves the residents of New York City and beyond. It houses some of RIPA’s various Randalls Island Kids (RIK) programs, including the Jesse Owens track club, RIK Dance programs, and components of RIK summer camp. RIPA was founded in 1992 as a public–private partnership to work on behalf of Randalls Island Park. The Alliance, in conjunction with City leadership and the local community, works to realize the Island’s unique potential by developing sports and recreational facilities, restoring its vast natural environment, reclaiming and maintaining parkland, and sponsoring community-linked programs for the children of New York City. RIPA runs free youth sports programs that bring over 14,000 under-resourced public school children from Harlem and the South Bronx to the island annually.

== Track and field ==
Since its opening, Icahn Stadium has hosted more than 200,000 high school, college and professional athletes and spectators during the track season. Each year, the number of meets and events that are scheduled has grown, bringing larger numbers of people to the facility.

In 2005, the Reebok Grand Prix was created and held at the stadium. Currently known as the Adidas Grand Prix of the Diamond League, the annual summer tournament welcomes top runners from around the world. From its inception it has distinguished itself as one of top meets to feature Olympic and World Champions.

- On May 31, 2008, Jamaican sprinter Usain Bolt set the then world record in the 100m on the Icahn Stadium track with a time of 9.72 seconds at the Reebok Grand Prix, .02 seconds faster than the previous record held by his countryman, Asafa Powell.
- On June 9, 2012, Kenyan runner David Rudisha set the record in the 800m in the U.S. with a time of 1:41.74 seconds at the Adidas Grand Prix.

== Lacrosse ==
In December 2012, the New York Lizards of Major League Lacrosse announced that the team would play two home games at Icahn Stadium for the 2013 season. The team played at the venue on June 6 and 13, 2013.

== Soccer ==
On June 27, 2013, the New York Cosmos revealed that their annual Cosmos Copa NYC soccer tournament would hold its final at the stadium, as many of the games were held at Randalls Island. Due to scheduling issues, the final was relocated. However, the site was used as a venue for the 2014 Cosmos Copa group stages.

In 2023, New York City FC donated $3 million to install a Kentucky bluegrass soccer field at Icahn Stadium. The club's reserve side, New York City FC II, will play part of its MLS Next Pro schedule starting in 2024. NYCFC will also host its annual NYPD/FDNY charity soccer match at Icahn in 2024.

On June 8, 2026, the Netherlands defeated Uzbekistan 2-1 in a closed door friendly as a tune-up game for the 2026 FIFA World Cup. Later that year, the stadium hosted an NWSL semifinal match between Gotham FC and the Kansas City Current, which the visiting team won, 2-1. Poor field conditions at Gotham FC’s home, Sports Illustrated Stadium, necessitated the move.

== Rugby ==
Following the installation of the new field by NYCFC, rugby is set to be played at the stadium.

== NYC Olympics ==
Icahn Stadium was incorporated as a training center into the New York City bid for the 2012 Summer Olympics. Future Olympic bids will also potentially use the stadium as a training facility, as it already meets IAAF specifications.
