= Hutsell-Rosen Track =

Track and field facility in Auburn, Alabama, US

Coordinates: 32.594878°N 85.494844°W

Hutsell-Rosen Track (originally named Wilbur Hutsell Track) is an outdoor track and field facility located in Auburn, Alabama on the campus of Auburn University. It is the official outdoor track and field facility for the Auburn Tigers track and field teams. Along with John McDonnell Field in Fayetteville, Arkansas, Hayward Field in Eugene, Oregon, Icahn Stadium in New York City and Rock Chalk Park in Lawrence, Kansas, Hutsell-Rosen is one of only five International Association of Athletics Federations Class 1-certified track and field complexes in the United States.

== History ==
After being constructed in 1970, the facility was originally named Wilbur Hutsell Track, in honor of Wilbur Hutsell, the first track coach at Auburn. After major renovations in 2006, the facility was officially renamed on April 22, 2008 to honor both Hutsell and Mel Rosen, Auburn's second track and field coach, who coached the team for 28 years. The track underwent resurfacing and upgrades in throwing facility during 2025. Hutsell-Rosen has hosted the Southeastern Conference Track and Field Championships six times since its construction, in 1973, 1980, 1988, 1997, 2008, and 2026.
