= John McDonnell Field =

Track facility in Fayetteville, Arkansas

- Interactive map of John McDonnell Field
- Location: 10 S. Razorback Rd. Fayetteville, Arkansas 72701
- Coordinates: 36°03′47″N 94°10′46″W
- Owner: University of Arkansas
- Capacity: 7,000 (10,000 with temporary seating)

Construction
- Renovated: 2006

Tenant
- University of Arkansas Track (NCAA)

John McDonnell Field is the outdoor track facility at the University of Arkansas in Fayetteville, Arkansas, and is home to the Arkansas Razorbacks. The field is named after former head coach John McDonnell, who ended his thirty-six-year collegiate head coaching career as the most successful coach in NCAA track history, attaining a total of 42 NCAA Championships (although the university was stripped of two due to NCAA sanctions) in three different sports with the Razorbacks. Renovated in 2006, it is one of only ten International Association of Athletics Federations Class 1 certified tracks in the United States (along with Robert C. Haugh Complex - Outdoor Track and Field, Jack Rose Track, Hutsell-Rosen Track, Hayward Field, Roy P. Drachman Stadium, Icahn Stadium, UT San Antonio's Park West Athletic Complex, E.B. Cushing Stadium, and Rock Chalk Park).

== History ==
Originally called University Track, Arkansas' outdoor track facility has gone through four major renovations. First in the late 1980s, prior to hosting the Southwest Conference Championships a new track surface was laid and the press box facility was renovated. When Arkansas hosted the 1994 Southeastern Conference Championships the runways and jumping areas were updated. During the same renovation project, a fully automated computer timing system and scoreboard located in the southeast corner of the track were added. In 1998 the track was stripped down to its foundation and resurfaced, the press box was gutted to its frame and built to twice its original capacity and wrought-iron fencing was erected around the perimeter of the facility. The two-year project continued with the pouring of concrete runways for the pole vault along the outskirts of the infield, allowing nearly every outdoor track and field event to be competed simultaneously if needed. The nine-lane, 400-meter track had permanent seating for more than 2,000 spectators and was open to the public for recreational use. On September 26, 1998, the track was re-dedicated in honor of men's track coach John McDonnell.

== Renovations ==
The most recent and dramatic renovations occurred in 2005. In preparation for the 2006 Southeastern Conference Outdoor Championships, Arkansas razed the old facility and rebuilt from the ground up. The original 2,000-seat venue was transformed into one that would hold potentially 10,000 spectators. The facility is one of only five IAAF Class 1 certified track and field complexes in the United States (along with Hayward Field in Eugene, Oregon, Hutsell-Rosen Track in Auburn, Alabama, Icahn Stadium in New York City and Rock Chalk Park in Lawrence, Kansas). The track itself is nine lanes. All competition areas are surfaced with a Mondo Super X Performance track surface. There are multiple jumping and throwing areas, with the vaulting and jumping areas being reversible to take advantage of wind conditions. There also two sets of pole vault and jumping areas so that multiple events (usually men's and women's) can be contested simultaneously. A 16-foot (4.9 m) by 9-foot (2.7 m) LED video board is installed in the north end of the stadium. The start-finish line was moved from the southwest to northeast corner of the track. Originally designed to be a bowl-shaped structure, seating in the north and south was omitted from construction due to budget and deadline issues. During track meets large tents are set up and teams usually set up camp on a large grass area in the open south end. The track is flanked by two large grandstands to the east and west that run the length of the 100-meter front and back stretches. Luxury suites were also supposed to be included in the large press box that runs the length of the east grandstand, however in the summer of 2008 they were converted into offices for men's and women's coaching staff as well as a team lounge. During that time, men's and women's locker rooms which share a common athletic training room were added under the east stands. Capacity is currently set at 7,000 but can potentially hold up to 10,000 with additional construction or temporary seating.

The new John McDonnell Field was rededicated on May 12, 2006 during the 2006 SEC Championships, which was the first meet held at complex since renovations. In 2008 the facility hosted the NCAA Mideast Regional Championships and hosted the 2009 NCAA Outdoor Championships. The track also hosts the annual John McDonnell Invitational as well as occasionally hosting Arkansas high school state championships. The facility hopes to eventually host national junior events, USA Outdoor Championships, and Olympic Trials.

In 2008 John McDonnell Field was named the outdoor track and field facility of the year by the American Sports Builders Association for exhibiting excellence in design and construction.

In 2014 the track was resurfaced. While the surface remained Mondo Super X, the once all red track was updated to be gray with red exchange zones. In the same year, Champions Plaza was added outside the north end of the stadium. The northwest entrance was updated with a renovated sign and a 7 foot 6 inch statue of former head coach, John McDonnell. Additionally the names of every Arkansas All-American are displayed on a plaque at the northwest end. The scoreboard at the north end was enclosed and a 18x38 foot backlit Razorback logo was installed on the back, making it the largest logo displayed on campus. At the base of the scoreboard are 5 plaques, commemorating the accomplishments of Arkansas' 5 Triple Crown (NCAA Team Champions in Cross Country, Indoor and Outdoor track in the same year) winning teams. Finally, 52 9-foot tall pillars adorn the northern end of the plaza, known as Championship Garden, displaying the names of all the members of each of Arkansas' NCAA championship teams, as well as several pillars dedicated to honoring the many Razorback Olympians (Olympic Garden).

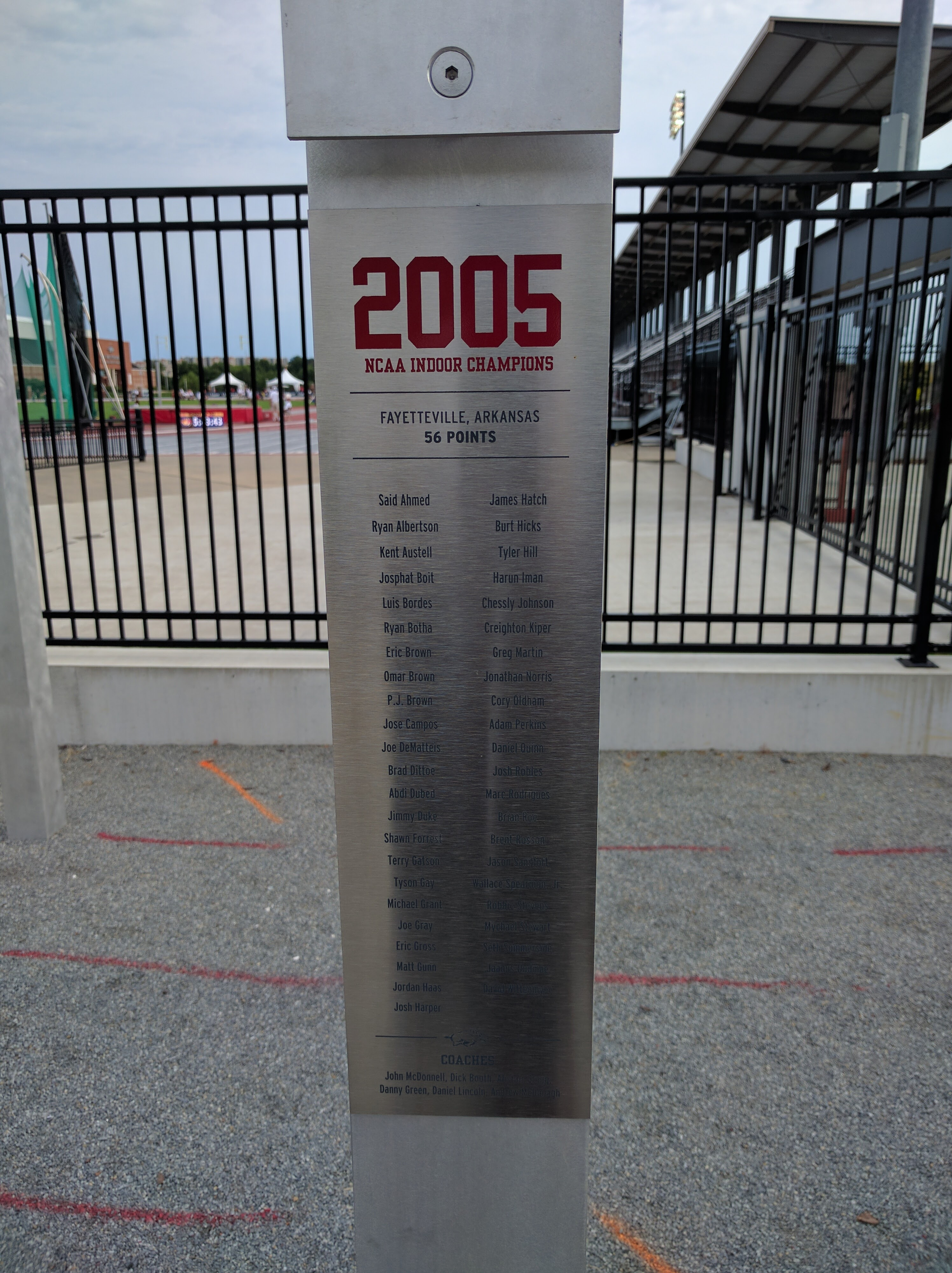
One of the 52 pillars in the Championship Garden celebrating Arkansas' NCAA Championship teams. At night each pillar is illuminated.

== Men's track records ==
Even though the track was completely rebuilt, all of the old records carried over and are accepted to be the facility records.

Event	Athlete, Affiliation, Year	Mark
100 Meters	Richard Thompson, LSU, 2008	9.97
200 Meters	Wallace Spearmon, Jr., Nike, 2007	19.87
400 Meters	Roddie Haley, Arkansas, 1985	44.67
800 Meters	James Hatch, Unattached, 2008	1:46.27
1,500 Meters	Joe Falcon, Arkansas, 1988	3:35.84
3,000 Meters	Johan Boakes, Arkansas, 1990	7:59.97
Steeplechase	Daniel Lincoln, Arkansas, 2002	8:29.16
5,000 Meters	Josphat Boit, Arkansas, 2006	13:52.17
10,000 Meters	Mark Curp, Kansas City TC, 1982	28:51.26
110-Meter Hurdles	Aries Merritt, Tennessee, 2006	13.22
400-Meter Hurdles	Rueben McCoy, Auburn, 2008	50.12
4x100-Meter Relay	Arkansas, 1985	38.81
4x400-Meter Relay	Baylor	3:04.91
High Jump	Doakes/Jenkins, Arkansas/Tennessee, 1994	7'-5.75"
Pole Vault	Lawrence Johnson, Tennessee, 1994	19'-0.25"
Long Jump	Erick Walder, Arkansas, 1994	27'-4.75"
Triple Jump	Mike Conley, Arkansas, 1985	56'-3.5"
Shot Put	Marty Kobza, Arkansas, 1985	66'-9.5"
Discus	Rashaud Scott, Kentucky, 2008	199'-10"
Javelin	Bob Roggy, Southern Illinois, 1977	267'-10"
Hammer	Cory Martin, Auburn, 2008	239'-10"
Decathlon	Chris Helwick, Tennessee, 2006	7,765 pts.
