= Ryan Field (1926) =

Home stadium of the Northwestern Wildcats. Evanston, Illinois

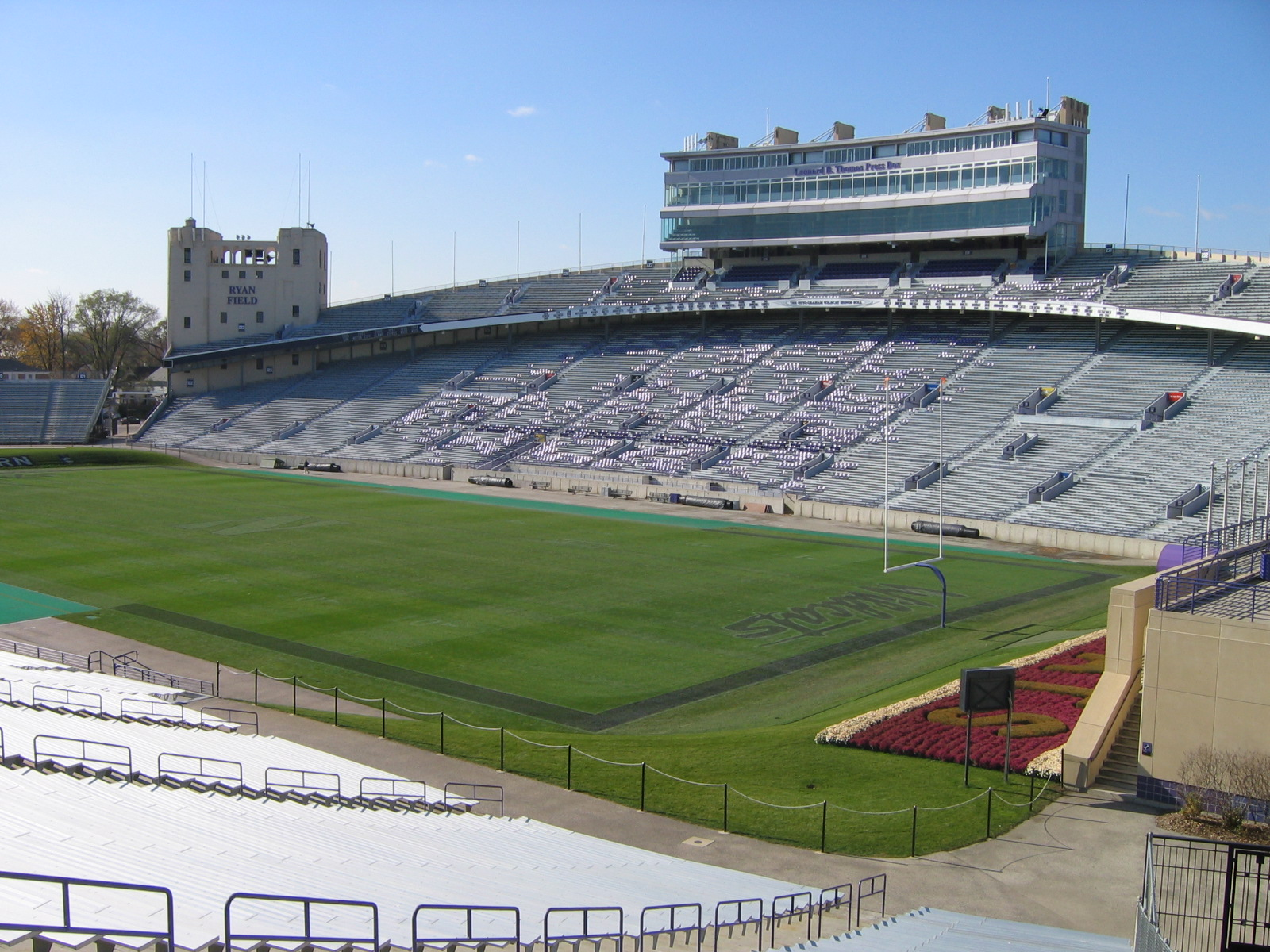
- View from northeast corner in 2006

- Location in the United States Location in Illinois
- Former names: Dyche Stadium (1926–1996)
- Location: 1501 Central Street; Evanston, Illinois, U.S.
- Coordinates: 42°3′56″N 87°41′33″W
- Owner: Northwestern University
- Operator: Northwestern University
- Capacity: Final capacity 47,130 (1997–2023) List: 48,187 (1996); 49,256 (1982–1995); 48,500 (1975–1981); 55,000 (1954–1974); 52,000 (1949–1953); 47,000 (1927–1934); 25,000 (1926)
- Surface: Grass: 1997–2023; Astroturf: 1973–1996; Grass: 1926–1972

Construction
- Groundbreaking: April 8, 1926
- Opened: October 2, 1926; 100 years ago
- Renovated: 1996
- Expanded: 1949, 1952
- Closed: November 25, 2023; 2 years ago
- Demolished: January 29–June 3, 2024
- Cost: $2.6 million ($47.3 million in 2025); 1996 renovation: $20 million
- Architect: James Gamble Rogers
- General contractor: J. B. French Construction Company

Tenant
- Northwestern Wildcats (NCAA) (1926–2023)

Website
- nusports.com/ryan-field

Ryan Field was a football stadium in the central United States, located in Evanston, Illinois, a suburb north of Chicago near the campus of Northwestern University. The stadium served as the home field of the Northwestern Wildcats of the Big Ten Conference.

The stadium opened in 1926 as Dyche Stadium, named for William Dyche, class of 1882, Evanston mayor from 1895 to 1899 and overseer of the building project. The stadium was renamed Ryan Field in 1997 in honor of the family of Aon Corporation founder Patrick G. Ryan, who was then the chairman of Northwestern's board of trustees. The renaming was made by the other members of the board in recognition of the Ryan family's leadership and numerous contributions to Northwestern, including the lead gift to the Campaign for Athletic Excellence, Northwestern's fundraising drive for athletic facilities.

Before the stadium's demolition in 2024, it was the only FBS stadium without permanent lighting, and its final seating capacity was 47,130. The stadium closed at the end of the 2023 season, and preparation for demolition began on January 29, 2024, to make way for a new Ryan Field on the site. On June 3, 2024, demolition was completed, putting a temporary pause on 97 years of Northwestern football at the site.

== History ==
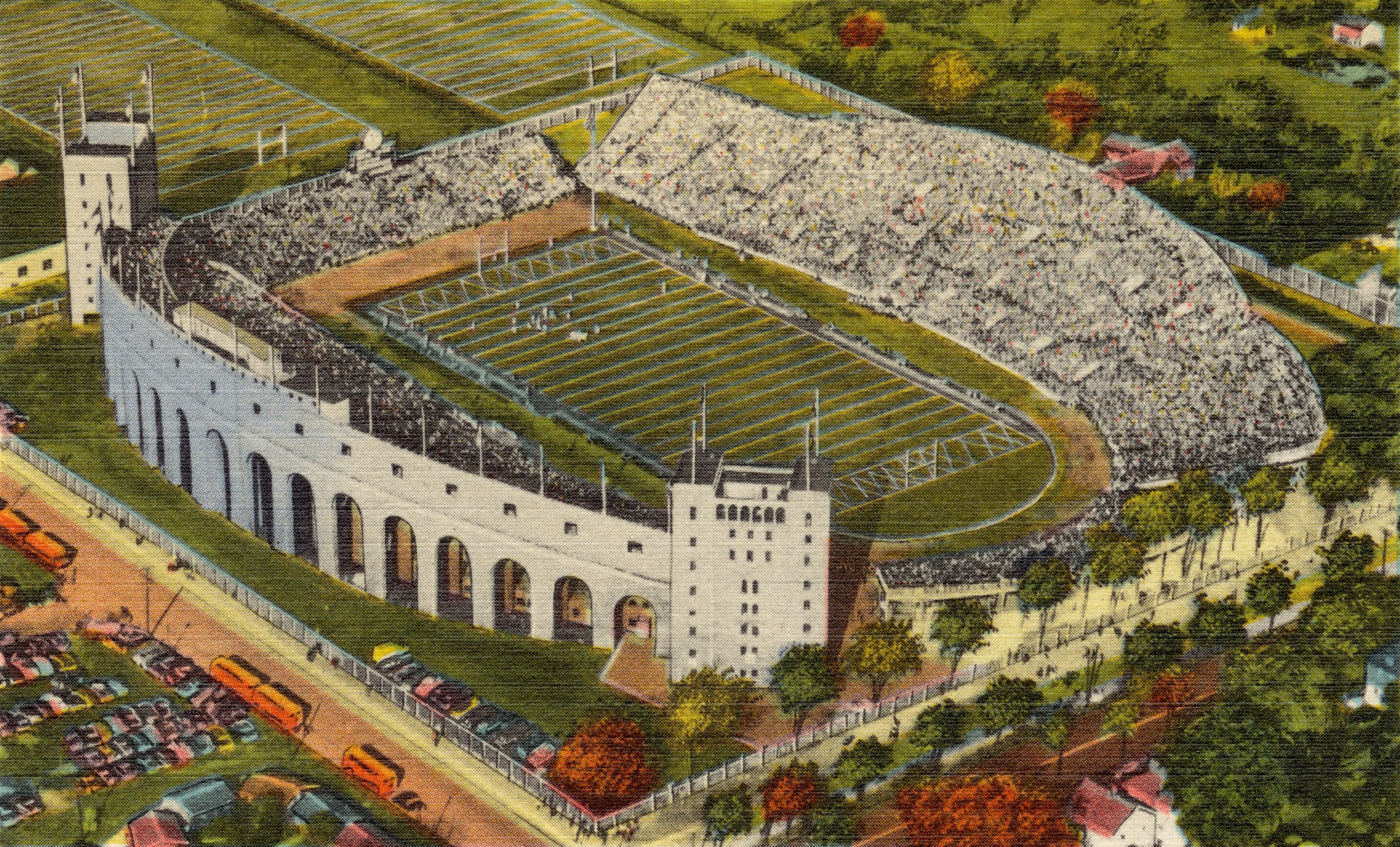
The stadium c. 1930–1945

At the time it was constructed, Dyche Stadium was considered one of the finest college football stadiums in the country. The stadium originally consisted of two semi-circular grandstands on either sideline, with the west (home) sideline having a small, curved upper deck whose 2 ends abut in matching concrete towers. The purpose of the curved grandstands was to maximize the number of fans sitting close to the action. A preliminary proposal featured both the west and east grandstands having symmetrical triple decks but was never realized because of cost overruns resulting from an accelerated construction schedule and average attendance figures that rarely approached 50,000. End zone seating was later added in the south, and in 1952 McGaw Memorial Hall was built beyond the north end zone.

The stadium had a natural grass surface when it opened. It switched to artificial turf in 1973 and was used until 1996. Before the 1997 season, the natural grass surface was restored, and the playing surface was lowered approximately 5 feet (1.5 m) to improve sight lines from the lowest rows of the stadium.

The Chicago Bears played their first home game of the 1970 season against the Philadelphia Eagles at Dyche Stadium on September 27 as an experiment; the NFL had required that the Bears move out of Wrigley Field because its seating capacity was under 50,000, which was below the minimum set out by the newly constituted post-merger NFL. Also, the Chicago Cubs were in a September pennant race with the Pittsburgh Pirates and New York Mets in the National League East. If Wrigley Field was needed for postseason baseball games, the temporary grandstand for football along the east sideline (in right and center field) would not be available until late October. After Evanston residents petitioned city officials to block the team from moving there permanently and the Big Ten Conference opposed the Bears' use of Northwestern's stadium, the Bears ended up moving to Chicago's Soldier Field the following year.

The stadium hosted the 1932 Women's (July 16) and 1948 Men's (July 9–10) US Olympic Trials for track and field. The venue also hosted the NCAA track and field championships in 1943.

It also hosted the summer College All-Star Game in 1943 and 1944, which had usually been instead held at Chicago's Soldier Field. Both games were played at night with the use of temporary lights. The college all-stars held their practices for the game at Dyche Stadium in years such as 1934 and 1935.

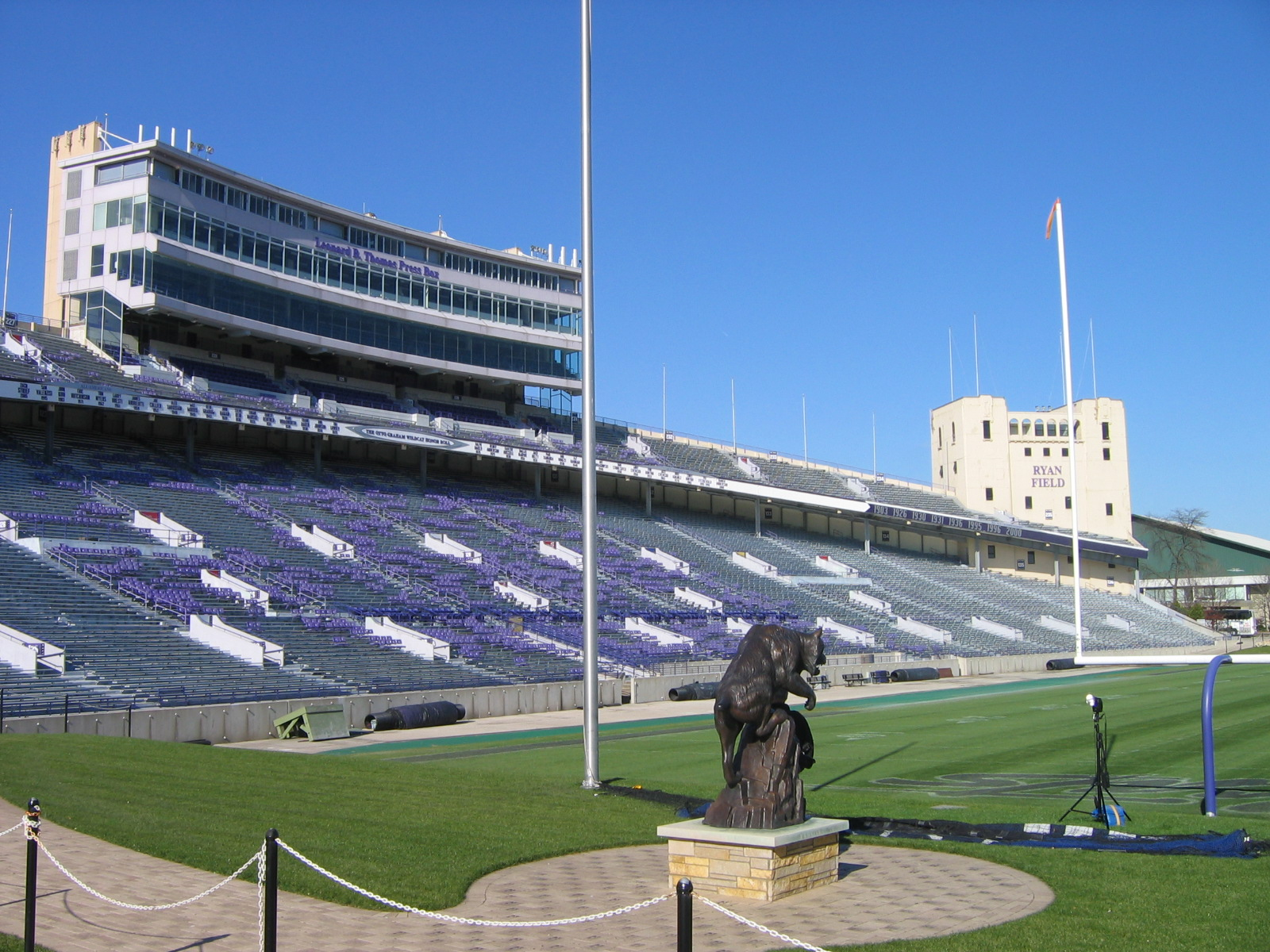
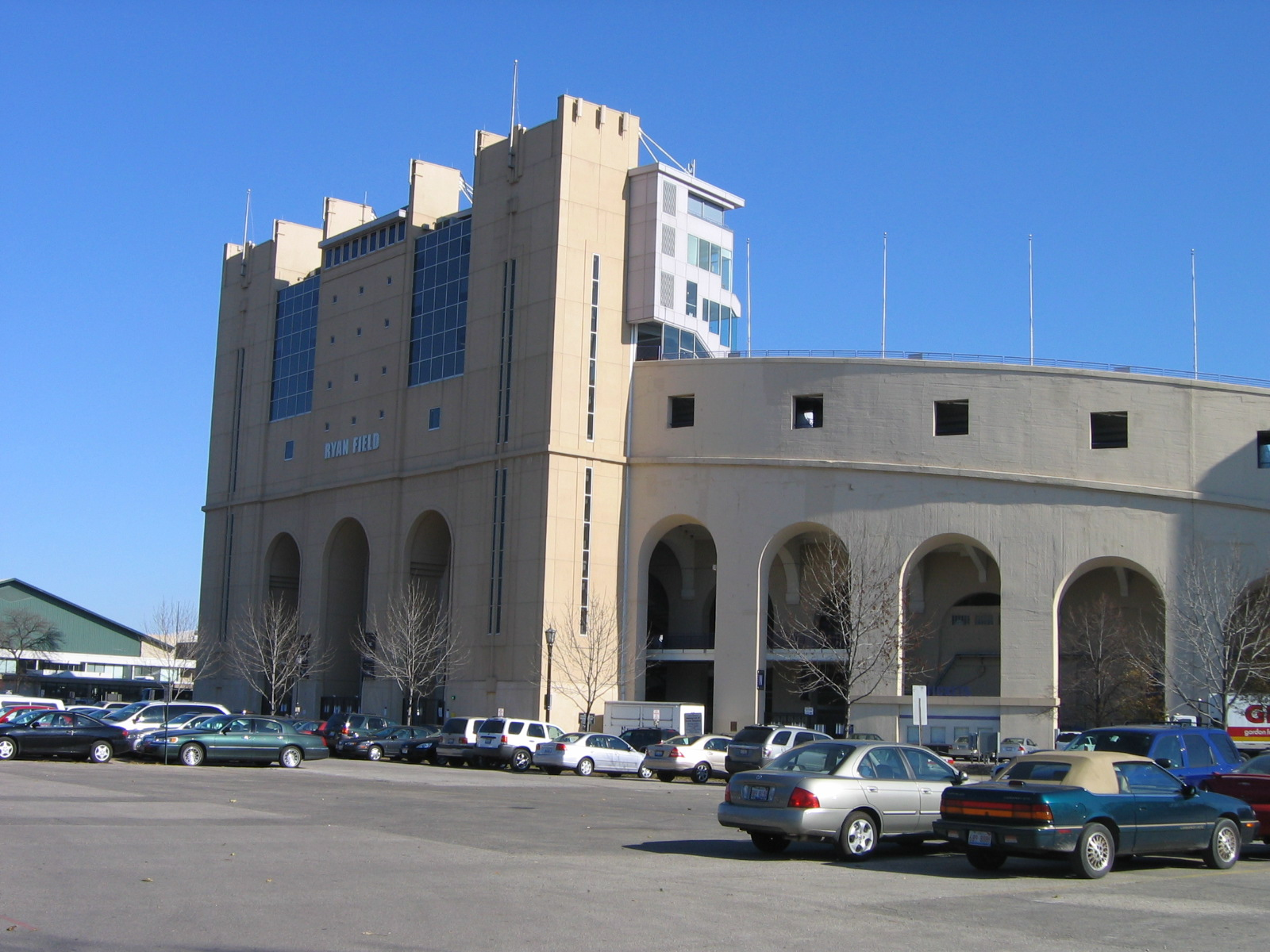
Grandstands and exterior view in November 2006

=== New stadium (2026–present) ===
On September 22, 2021, Northwestern announced that the Ryan family had donated $480 million to the university, providing initial funding for replacing Ryan Field with a new stadium at the current site. A year later, Northwestern announced initial design concepts for the new stadium, and that the Ryan family had committed to adding to their initial stadium gift.

The replacement stadium is projected to open in September 2026, at a preliminary cost of $850 million, making it the most expensive college football stadium in the country. Led by the architecture firms HNTB and Perkins&Will, the stadium will have a capacity of 35,000, a reduction of 12,000 from the previous facility and the smallest football stadium in the Big Ten Conference. The final budget was modestly increased to $862 million after the addition of a club area dedicated to younger Northwestern alumni.

The new stadium is projected to be 78 percent larger than its predecessor to accommodate club and plaza areas for entertainment and dining spaces. The stadium will have a canopy for spectator weather protection and for sound retention as a competitive advantage. As was not required at the time of the original 1926 opening, the stadium will also contain required ADA-compliant seats. According to the Front Office Sports website, "The venue's defining characteristic is intimacy." The new stadium's premium seating area starts 90 feet (27 m) from the field, and the most distant seats in the stadium are 135 feet (41 m) away. By contrast, the highest-priced seats at the largest college football venue, Michigan Stadium, are 235 feet (72 m) from the field, and the most distant seats are 253 feet (77 m) from the sideline.

Northwestern's plan to use the new stadium as a commercial concert venue had been met with opposition from stadium neighbors and other Evanston residents. Issues included Northwestern's alleged failure to address issues of noise, parking, traffic congestion, and public safety. Additionally, some have questioned the stadium's continuing to have a property tax exemption while being used for commercial purposes. However, the new stadium was approved for six concerts during summer 2027. Northwestern will also use the new stadium as its women's lacrosse home, and the local Evanston Township High School will play its home football games there. Pat Ryan Jr., son of the new stadium's namesake, called the high school a "second anchor tenant".

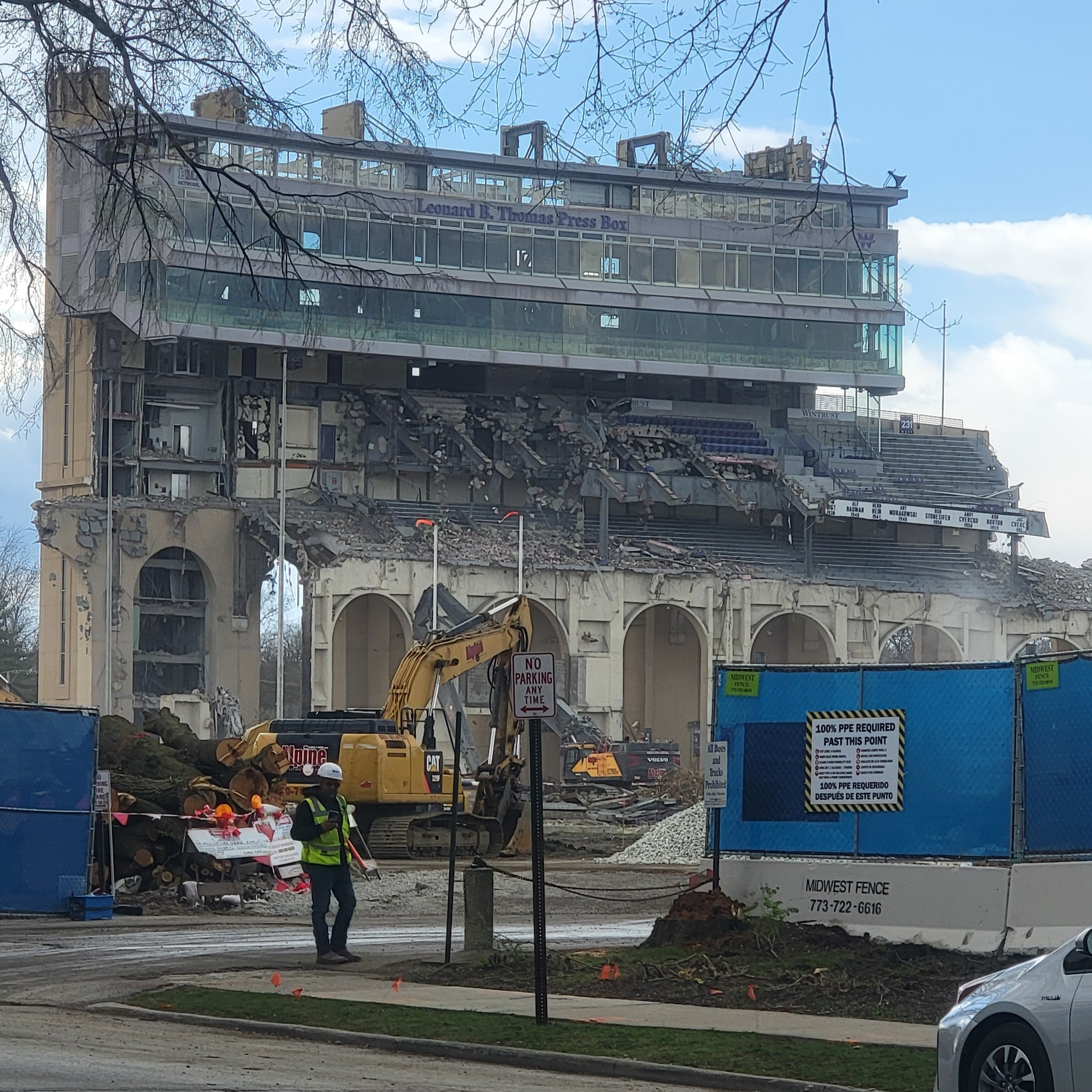
Ryan Field undergoing demolition in April 2024

On January 20, 2024, it was announced that a demolition process, without explosives, would begin on January 29. The process was estimated to take four to six months upon confirmation that the new, $850 million stadium would replace the current, aging one. Northwestern's football team played at Martin Field in 2024 and 2025.

== Renaming controversy ==
In 1997 Northwestern's decision to rename Dyche Stadium to Ryan Field defied the university's own 1926 resolution that forbade such a change. School officials said that a private institution can override previous boards' decisions, and dismissed the earlier resolution as a "show of appreciation." But NU did not explain why a mere gesture of appreciation would expressly state that any football stadium at any location would retain the name Dyche, as indeed the 1926 resolution does. The Dyche family was not notified of the change; NU claimed that the only descendant they found was a grandniece, despite other family members living in Chicago and being listed in the phone book. After the family protested, NU said it was willing to install an informational plaque at the stadium, noting its former name.

== Transportation ==
The closest transit stations are Metra commuter railroad's Central Street station and Chicago Transit Authority's Central station on the Purple Line.

== In popular culture ==
Parts of The Express: The Ernie Davis Story, a 2008 film about Syracuse University Heisman Trophy winner Ernie Davis starring Rob Brown as Davis, and Dennis Quaid as Davis' Syracuse coach, Ben Schwartzwalder, were filmed at Ryan Field.

Parts of Four Friends, a 1981 film directed by Arthur Penn, were filmed at Dyche Stadium.

== See also ==
- List of NCAA Division I FBS football stadiums
