= Tom Jones (runner) =

American long-distance runner

Personal information
- Born: November 28, 1916 Yonkers, New York, United States
- Died: October 1984 Oxford, Pennsylvania, United States

Sport
- Sport: Long-distance running
- Event: Marathon

Tom Jones (November 28, 1916 – October 1984) was an American long-distance runner. He competed in the marathon at the 1952 Summer Olympics. He is the namesake of the Tom Jones Memorial held in his honor.

Jones attended Earlham College where he was a three-year captain in cross country and senior captain of the track team. In 1995, they posthumously inducted him into the Earlham College Athletic Hall of Fame. Following his athletics days, he was a professor of history at Lincoln University (Pennsylvania), where he was also a volunteer track coach.
