= Eddie O'Toole =

American long-distance runner

Eddie O'Toole (28 June 1921 – 12 September 1997) was an American long-distance runner who competed in the 1948 Summer Olympics.
