= Lillian Young =

American sprinter

Personal information
- Born: March 25, 1928 Chicago, Illinois, United States
- Died: January 4, 1983 (aged 54) Bremen Township, Illinois, United States

Sport
- Sport: Sprinting
- Event: 100 metres

Lillian Young (March 25, 1928 – January 4, 1983) was an American sprinter. She competed in the women's 100 metres at the 1948 Summer Olympics.
