= Auburn Tigers =

Athletic teams representing Auburn University

- University: Auburn University
- Nickname: Tigers
- NCAA: Division I (FBS)
- Conference: Southeastern Conference
- Athletic director: John Cohen
- Location: Auburn, Alabama
- Varsity teams: 21
- Football stadium: Jordan-Hare Stadium
- Basketball arena: Neville Arena
- Baseball stadium: Plainsman Park
- Softball stadium: Jane B. Moore Field
- Volleyball arena: Neville Arena
- Colors: Burnt orange and navy blue
- Mascot: Aubie
- Fight song: War Eagle (Auburn Fight Song)
- Cheer: “War Eagle”
- Website: auburntigers.com
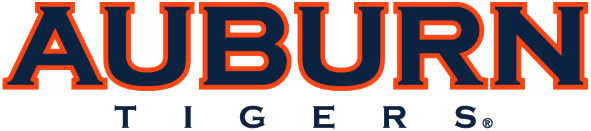

SEC logo in Auburn colors

The Auburn Tigers are the athletic teams representing Auburn University, a public four-year university located in Auburn, Alabama, United States. The Auburn Tigers compete in Division I of the National Collegiate Athletic Association (NCAA) as a member of the Southeastern Conference (SEC).

== Sports sponsored ==
Men's sports	Women's sports
Baseball	Basketball
Basketball	Cross country
Cross country	Equestrian
Football	Golf
Golf	Gymnastics
Swimming & diving	Soccer
Tennis	Softball
Track & field^{1}	Swimming & diving
	Tennis
	Track & field^{1}
	Volleyball
^{1} – includes both indoor and outdoor.

Auburn sponsors 21 varsity teams in 15 sports and competes in the Southeastern Conference.

=== Football ===
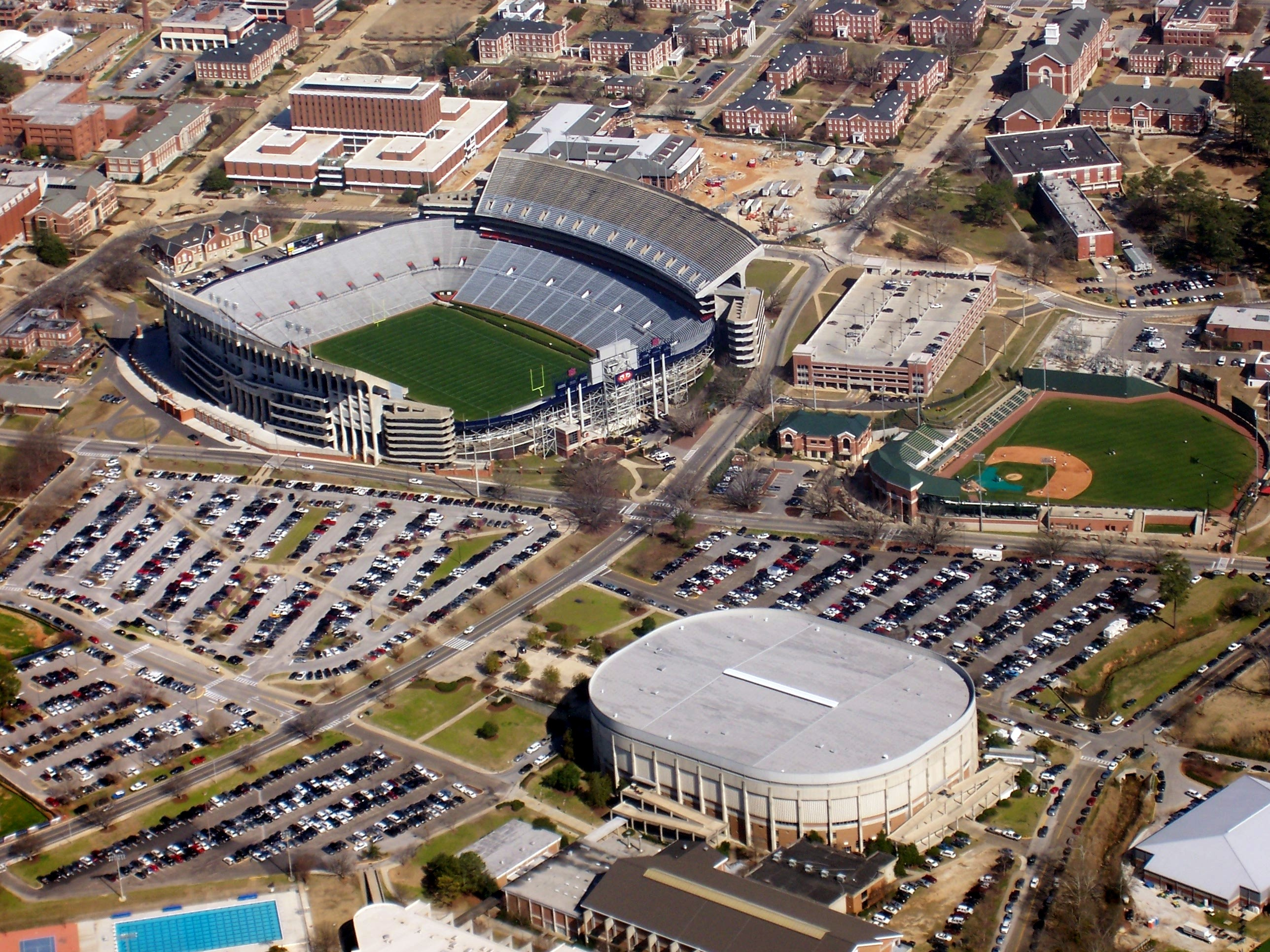
Jordan–Hare Stadium, Beard–Eaves–Memorial Coliseum, and Samford Stadium – Hitchcock Field at Plainsman Park

Auburn claims nine national championships: 1910, 1913 (chosen by one selector in 1999), 1914, 1957, 1958, 1983, 1993, (one of four co-champions by one selector), 2004 and 2010. Auburn currently is 7th all time in total national championships tied with Ohio State and Pitt. Three Auburn players, Pat Sullivan in 1971, Bo Jackson in 1985, and Cam Newton in 2010 have won the Heisman Trophy. The Trophy's namesake, John Heisman, coached at Auburn from 1895 until 1899. Auburn is the only school that Heisman coached at (among others, Georgia Tech and Clemson) that has produced a Heisman Trophy winner. Auburn's Jordan–Hare Stadium has a capacity of 88,048 ranking as one of the largest on-campus stadiums in the entire country.

Auburn played the first football game in the Deep South in 1892 against the University of Georgia at Piedmont Park in Atlanta, Georgia. The Tigers' first bowl appearance was in 1937 in the sixth Bacardi Bowl played in Havana, Cuba. AU Football has won 12 conference championships (8 SEC), has had seven perfect seasons, and since the division of the conference in 1992, six outright western division championships (1997, 2000, 2004, 2010, 2013, 2017) along with three additional co-championships. Auburn plays archrival Alabama each year in a game known as the Iron Bowl. In the overall series with Alabama, Auburn trails Alabama 42–35–1, despite holding an 18–14 advantage in games played since 1982. Of the 14 SEC member universities, Auburn currently ranks 5th in the number of SEC football championships, and has won the most SEC titles of any program in the last decade.

Auburn completed the 2004 football season with an unblemished 13–0 record winning the SEC championship, their first conference title since 1989 and their first outright title since 1987. However, this achievement was somewhat overshadowed by the Tigers being left out of the BCS championship game in deference to two other undefeated, higher ranked teams, USC and Oklahoma. The 2004 team was led by quarterback Jason Campbell (Washington Redskins), running backs Carnell Williams (Tampa Bay Buccaneers) and Ronnie Brown (Miami Dolphins), and cornerback Carlos Rogers (Washington Redskins).

Auburn completed the 2010 football season with a perfect record of 13–0 winning the SEC championship when they defeated the University of South Carolina 56–17, which set an SEC Championship Game record for most points scored and largest margin of victory. The Tigers went on to defeat the Oregon Ducks 22–19 in their first appearance in the BCS National Championship Game on January 10, 2011, in Glendale, Arizona. The 2010 team was led by quarterback Cam Newton, who became the Heisman trophy winner of 2010 along with multiple other awards.

Auburn completed the 2013 regular season with an 11–1 record by knocking off then #1 Alabama. Auburn went on to defeat #5 Missouri 59–42 in the 2013 SEC Championship Game to claim its eighth SEC championship. Auburn faced #1 Florida State in the 2014 BCS National Championship Game at the Rose Bowl, falling to the Seminoles in the final seconds, 31–34. The Tigers finished the season with a 12–2 record and ranked #2 in the final AP and Coaches polls.

=== Swimming and diving ===
In the last decade under former head coach David Marsh, Auburn's swimming and diving program became a virtual dynasty in the SEC and the NCAA winning five consecutive NCAA men's championships from 2003 through 2007 and women's championships in 2002, 2003, 2004, 2006 and 2007. The Auburn men have won the SEC Championship 14 out of the last 15 years and also won national championships in 1997, 1999, and 2009. The Auburn men won their 13th consecutive SEC Title in 2008, while the Auburn women took home their fifth SEC Championship in the last six years. The Auburn men's 44 consecutive, five-year, dual-meet win record came to an end on January 11, 2007, when they lost to Texas 130–113, exactly five years to the date of their last loss in 2001, also to Texas.

Auburn swimmers have represented the U.S. and several other countries in recent Olympics. Auburn's most famous swimmer is Olympic gold medalist Rowdy Gaines, winner of three gold medals at the 1984 Summer Olympics. Auburn's most successful female Olympic swimmer is Kirsty Coventry (swimming for her home country of Zimbabwe) who won a gold, silver and bronze medal at the 2004 Summer Olympics in Athens.

Marsh left Auburn after the 2007 season to become the Head Elite Coach and CEO of the United States Olympic Committee Center of Excellence in Charlotte, North Carolina and was succeeded by former Auburn head coach Richard Quick who led Stanford and Texas to 12 NCAA titles in two decades of coaching between 1984 and 2005.

=== Men's basketball ===
The Auburn men's basketball team has enjoyed off-and-on success over the years. Its best known alumnus is Charles Barkley.

Other NBA players from Auburn are Chuck Person, Wesley Person, Chris Porter, Marquis Daniels, Moochie Norris, and Pat Burke.

=== Men's golf ===
The men's golf team has won five SEC Championships: 1976, 1981, 2002, 2018, and 2024. Chip Spratlin claimed the 1995 NCAA Championship and the men's golf team won the 2024 and 2026 NCAA Championship. Jackson Koivun was the recipient of the 2024 Fred Haskins Award, the first in Auburn history and first freshman to be awarded since 2012.

=== Women's golf ===
Auburn's women's golf team has risen to be extremely competitive in the NCAA in recent years. Since 1999, they hold an 854–167–13 (.826 win percentage) record. The team has been in five NCAA finals and finished second in 2002 and then third in 2005. The program has a total of nine SEC Championships (1989, 1996, 2000, 2003, 2005, 2006, 2009, 2011, 2020). The nine titles is third all-time for women's golf. In October 2005, Auburn was named the #3 team nationally out of 229 total teams since 1999 by GolfWeek magazine. Auburn's highest finish in the NCAA tournament was a tie for 2nd in 2002.

Since 1996, the team has been headed by Coach Kim Evans, a 1981 alumna, who has turned the program into one of the most competitive in the nation. Coach Evans has helped develop All-Americans, SEC Players of the Year as well as three SEC Freshman of the Year. She has led the Tigers to eight-straight NCAA appearances. She is by far the winningest Coach in Auburn Golf History, having over 1,100 wins and winning six of Auburn's seven total SEC Titles. Evans was named National Coach of the Year in 2003 and has coached 8 individual All-Americans while at Auburn.

=== Women's soccer ===
Auburn Soccer has been one of the top programs of the SEC. The team started in 1993 and after some growing pains is now a constant player in the SEC Conference championship race. Auburn won four straight SEC West division titles between 2001–2004 and a fifth in 2006. They won the regular season SEC title in 2002.

The 2006 Auburn soccer season saw the Tigers playing only five seniors and 13 freshmen who saw significant playing time. Despite the youth, Auburn went on to an 11–5–3 including a 5–3–3 mark in the SEC to retake the SEC Western division title. The Season ended on a 3–1 loss in the first round of the NCAA tournament to California in Tallahassee, Florida.

The 2011 Auburn soccer team defeated Florida, 3–2 to win the SEC Tournament on 11/6/11.

=== Equestrian ===
Women's equestrian debuted in 1996 and became the school's 21st varsity sport five years later. The team has been led by Greg Williams since its debut. In 2004, the team won its first championship at the Southern Equestrian Championships, which started in 2003. In 2006, the team won its first Varsity Equestrian National Championship, capturing Auburn's first national title outside of football and swimming and diving. The team earned its first Hunt Seat national title in 2008, while the Tigers finished third in the overall standings. The team won their second national championship in 2011, their third in 2013, fourth in 2016 and fifth in 2018.

Although equestrian is not yet sanctioned by the NCAA, Auburn competes with 19 other Division I schools, including SEC foes Georgia and South Carolina. The NCAA classified equestrian as an emerging sport in 1998. Forty Division I and Division II schools are required for the sport to be recognized by the NCAA. Currently, there are 23 programs, and more are expected to be added each year.

=== Track and field ===
Auburn's Women's Track and Field won the 2006 National NCAA Outdoor title convincingly by outscoring USC 57–38.50. The track title was the 4th National Championship won by Auburn in 2006. In Outdoor Track and Field, the previous highest finish for the Women was 14th in 2002 and 2003. The Auburn men have finished second in the NCAA Outdoor championships twice in 2003 and 2008. The men have earned two third-place finishes in 2000 and 2007. The Auburn team was coached for 28 years by Mel Rosen, for whom the Hutsell-Rosen Track was in part named in 2006.

=== Women's gymnastics ===
Since its reinstatement in 1975, the Tigers women's gymnastics team has made two appearances in the Super Six.

== Notable non-varsity sports ==
=== Wrestling ===
At the conclusion of the 1980–1981 NCAA Wrestling season, Auburn University became the first SEC team to place Top 10 in the country. Coached by Ohio wrestling legend Tom Milkovich, Auburn claimed the SEC title en route to a historic season boasting 3 All-Americans and 6 NCAA qualifiers. However, with the emergence of Title IX and the decline of wrestling in the SEC, Auburn found itself without a varsity program after the historic 1980–81 season. Since 1997 Auburn has competed in the National Collegiate Wrestling Association (NCWA) as the Auburn University Wrestling Club and boasts 24 All-Americans and a National Champion, with six Top-10 finishes at the Division 1 National Championships. Auburn, headed by President Justin King, looks to further this success in its 26th year of membership in the NCWA.

=== Cycling ===
The Auburn Flyers are the premier cycling club in the Auburn / Opelika area for college students. With frequent rides and races, the team caters to all levels of riders, entry to advanced. The Flyers members have been riding anywhere from months to years, with all levels of competition represented by the team.

The team fields both road and mountain bike teams in the Southeastern Collegiate Cycling Conference within USAC Collegiate Cycling. Other teams within their conference include traditional Auburn rivals Georgia, Georgia Tech, and Florida.

==== Southeastern Collegiate Cycling Conference Champions ====
- 2013 (B Category Omnium) - Nathan Spence
- 2014 (B Category Omnium) - Frank Whittle
- 2016 (A Category Omnium) - Nathan Spence

=== Rugby ===
The Auburn University Rugby Football Club was founded in 1973. Auburn plays Division 1 college rugby in the Southeastern Collegiate Rugby Conference against traditional SEC rivals such as Alabama and Georgia. Auburn rugby is one of only two club sports at Auburn with an endowment fund, resulting in the university allocating additional resources to rugby.

== Championships ==
=== NCAA team championships ===
The Auburn Tigers have won 16 total NCAA team national championships.

- Men's (10)
  - Swimming (8): 1997, 1999, 2003, 2004, 2005, 2006, 2007, 2009
  - Golf (2): 2024, 2026
- Women's (6)
  - Outdoor Track and Field (1): 2006
  - Swimming (5): 2002, 2003, 2004, 2006, 2007
- see also
  - SEC NCAA team championships
  - List of NCAA schools with the most NCAA Division I championships

=== Other national team championships ===
Auburn has won fifteen additional national championships in the following team sports In the case of football, Auburn claims nine national titles. While the NCAA has never officially endorsed a championship team, it has documented the choices of recognized "major selectors", some of whom named Auburn as national champions for 1910 (retroactive), 1913 (retroactive co-champion), 1957 (AP), 1983, 1993 (four NCF co-champions), and 2010 (AP, Coaches). While no major selectors chose Auburn for the 1914, 1958, and 2004 undefeated seasons, others did: James Howell chose Auburn for 1914, Montgomery Full Season Championship chose Auburn for 1958, and Darryl W. Perry and GBE College Football Ratings chose Auburn for 2004.

- Men's
  - Football (9)^{a}:1910, 1913, 1914, 1957, 1958, 1983, 1993, 2004, 2010
- Women's
  - Equestrian (6): 2006, 2011, 2013, 2016, 2018, 2019
- See also
  - List of NCAA schools with the most Division I national championships

== Aubie ==
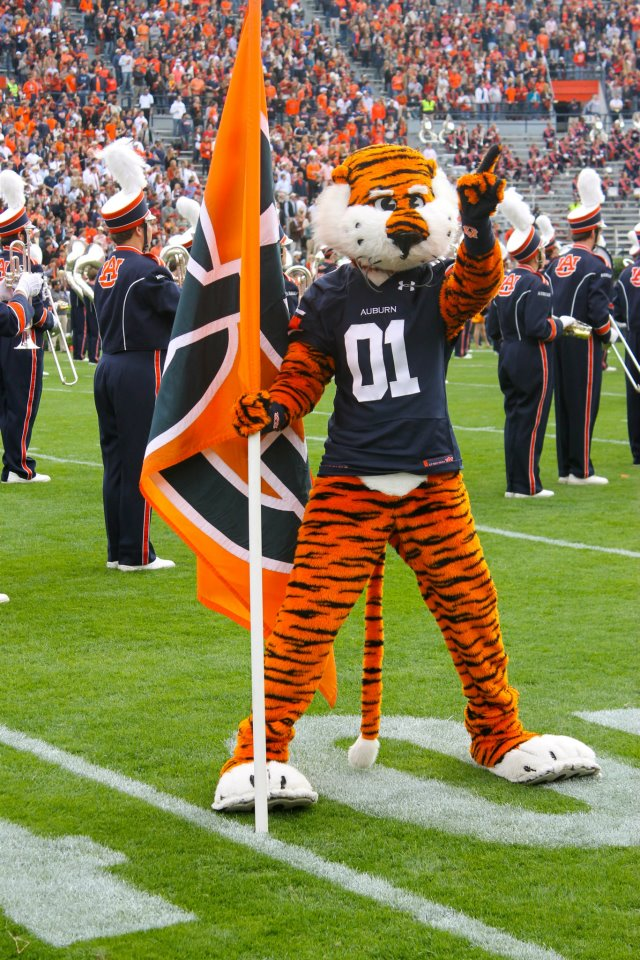
Aubie carries an Auburn flag during pre-game in Jordan-Hare Stadium

Aubie is an anthropomorphic tiger and the official mascot of Auburn University. Aubie's existence began as a cartoon character that first appeared on the Auburn/Hardin-Simmons football program cover on October 3, 1959. Birmingham Post-Herald artist Phil Neel created the cartoon tiger, who continued to appear on Auburn program covers for 18 years. Aubie's look changed through the years. In 1962, he began to stand upright and in the next year, 1963, wore clothes for the first time—a blue tie, polkadot pants, and straw hat. Aubie's appearances on game programs occurred during a successful period in head football coach Ralph "Shug" Jordan's teams. The Tigers were victorious in the first nine games which had Aubie on the cover and in his first six years, Auburn posted a 23–2–1 home record. Auburn's home record during the eighteen years Aubie served as Cover Tiger was 63–16–2. Aubie's regular appearance on the game program cover ended on October 23, 1976, when Auburn beat Florida State, 31–19, but Aubie returned to Auburn's cover in the Iron Bowl against Alabama on November 30, 1991, Auburn's last home game at Birmingham's Legion Field.

In 1979, Aubie came to life at the Southeastern Conference basketball tournament. James Lloyd, Auburn spirit director for the Student Government Association, with help from the Auburn Alumni Association, contacted Brooks-Van Horn Costumes in New York, N.Y. The company was provided with copies of the 1961 Auburn-Alabama and 1962 Auburn-Georgia Tech game programs to use for reference in creating a costume of the cartoon character. The firm, which also provided costumes for Walt Disney, designed and produced a Tiger costume for $1,350. Individual contributions from various Auburn clubs, alumni and friends helped pay for the first costume.

Aubie was introduced at the Birmingham–Jefferson Civic Center on February 28, 1979, and helped lead first-year Auburn coach Sonny Smith's team to an upset of Vanderbilt in his first appearance as a live Tiger mascot. The following day, Aubie returned to the arena and the Tigers beat Georgia in the longest game in SEC tournament history, four overtimes. Before the weekend was complete, Aubie helped lead the ninth-place team in the regular season to the semifinals of the tournament.

Aubie has won a record eleven mascot national championships — more than any other mascot in the United States (1991, 1995, 1996, 1999, 2003, 2006, 2012, 2014, 2016, 2021, and 2024). Aubie was named the 2014 Capital One Mascot of the Year and was among the first three college mascots inducted to the Mascot Hall of Fame in 2006.

== Traditions ==
=== Tiger Walk ===
Before each Auburn home football game, thousands of Auburn fans line Donahue Avenue to cheer on the team as they walk from the Auburn Athletic Complex to Jordan–Hare Stadium. The tradition began in the 1960s when groups of kids would walk up the street to greet the team and get autographs. During the tenure of coach Doug Barfield, the coach urged fans to come out and support the team, and thousands did. Auburn is the first known school to conduct an organized procession of players into the stadium. Today the team, led by the coaches, walks down the hill and into the stadium surrounded by fans who pat them on the back and shake their hands as they walk. The largest Tiger Walk occurred on December 2, 1989, before the first ever home football game against rival Alabama—the Iron Bowl. On that day, an estimated 20,000 fans packed the one block section of road leading to the stadium. According to former athletic director David Housel, Tiger Walk has become "the most copied tradition in all of college football." As it grew in popularity, the Tiger Walk has become a fixture for road games. Fans will gather at visiting stadiums and cheer the team on from the buses into the stadium.

=== Toomer's Corner ===
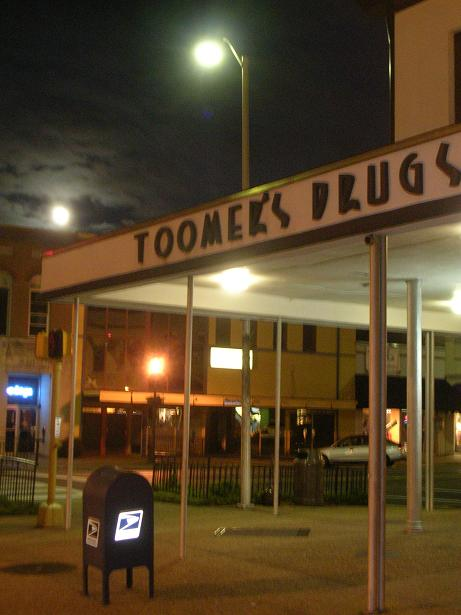
Toomers' Corner

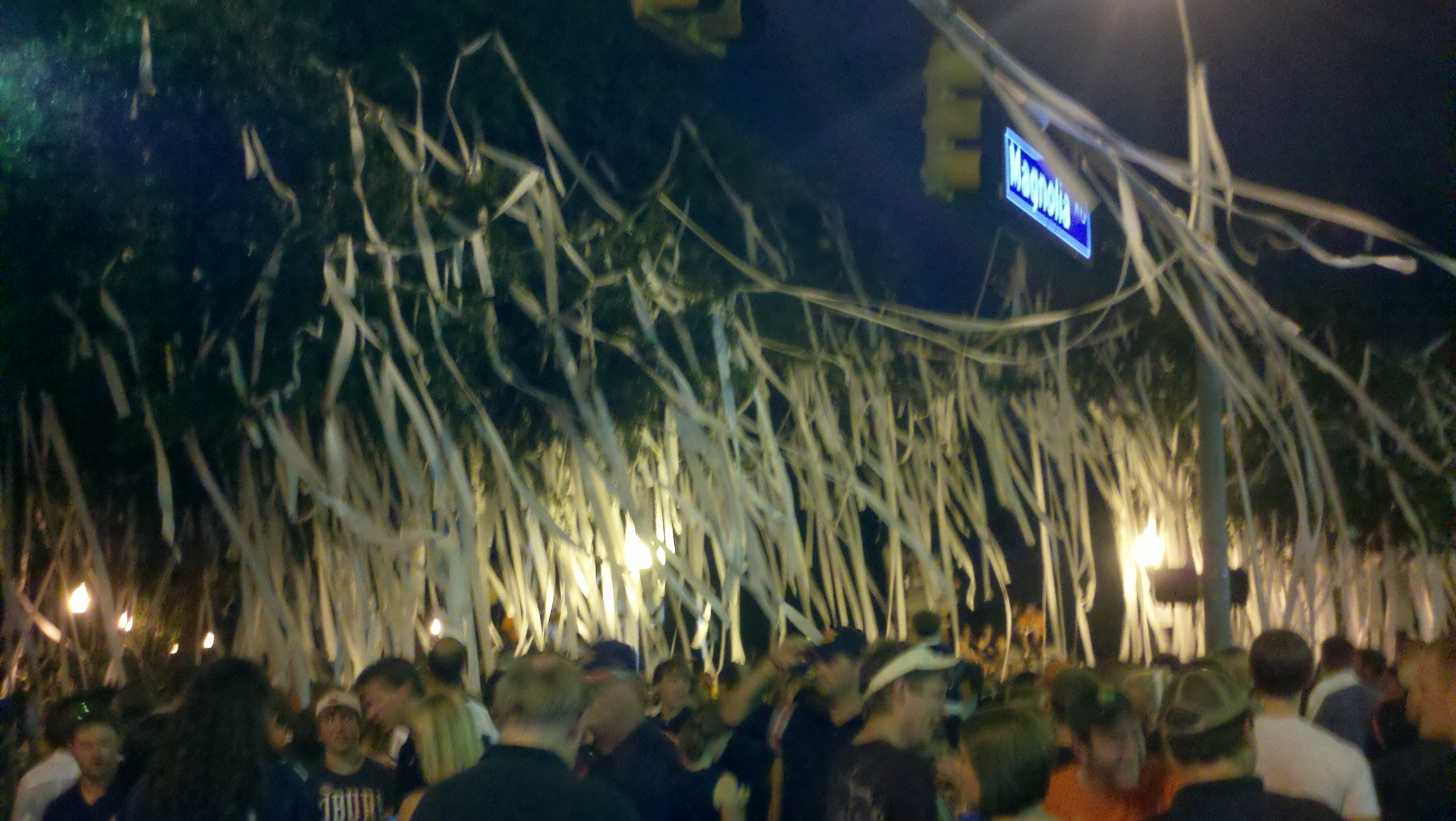
Fans rolling the trees opposite Toomer's Drugs after a home win over Clemson in 2010

The intersection of Magnolia Avenue and College Street in Auburn, which marks the transition from downtown Auburn to the university campus, is known as Toomer's Corner. It is named for businessman and State Senator Sheldon Toomer who founded the Bank of Auburn on the corner of Magnolia Avenue and College Street in 1907. Toomer's Drugs is a small business on the corner that has been an Auburn landmark for over 130 years.

==== Toomer's Trees and the Rolling Tradition ====
Hanging over the corner were two massive southern live oak trees, and anytime anything good happened concerning Auburn, toilet paper could usually be found hanging from the trees. Also known as "rolling the corner" or "rolling Toomer's", this tradition is thought to have originated in the 1950s to celebrate away victories; however, in recent years it has become a way to celebrate anything good that happens concerning Auburn. On January 10, 2011, when Auburn football won the 2011 BCS National Championship Game, a celebration was held at the corner which involved the traditional papering. The trees were removed on April 23, 2013, due to poisoning in 2010. New trees were planted in their place in 2015, and were open to rolling in August 2023.

==== Toomer's Trees poisoned ====
On January 27, 2011, a man calling himself "Al" and claiming to be from Dadeville, a town thirty minutes from Auburn, called into Paul Finebaum's sports talk radio show. "Al" claimed to have poisoned the Toomer's trees with an herbicide called Spike 80DF (Tebuthiuron) the weekend following the 2010 Iron Bowl. He said he did this in retaliation for photos that he saw in an article in The Birmingham News that depicted Auburn fans rolling Toomer's Corner after announcement of former University of Alabama head-coach Paul "Bear" Bryant's death in 1983 as well as of an Auburn #2 (number of 2010 Auburn quarterback Cam Newton) Under Armour T-shirt taped to Bryant's statue earlier in the 2010 season. He ended his call by saying, "Roll damn Tide!" An exhaustive search of newspapers found no evidence of Toomer's Corner being rolled upon Bryant's death.

The caller's claims prompted Auburn to take soil samples. On February 16, 2011, Auburn officials announced that the live oak trees at Toomer's Corner had been poisoned with a large quantity of Spike 80DF, a herbicide governed by Alabama state agricultural laws and the Environmental Protection Agency; Spike 80DF was not used by Auburn University. Tests of soil samples showed the lowest levels of Spike 80DF to be 0.78ppm, which experts stated was enough to be a "very lethal dose." The highest levels of concentration were measured to be 51ppm. Gary Keever, an Auburn University professor of horticulture and a member of Auburn's Tree Preservation Committee has said "[Spike 80DF] is extremely active and persistent [and] it's likely to be in the soil for 3 to 5 years." Concerns about the poisoned groundwater were dropped following further soil analysis, but later the soil from Toomer's Corner was completely excavated and replaced with untainted soil.

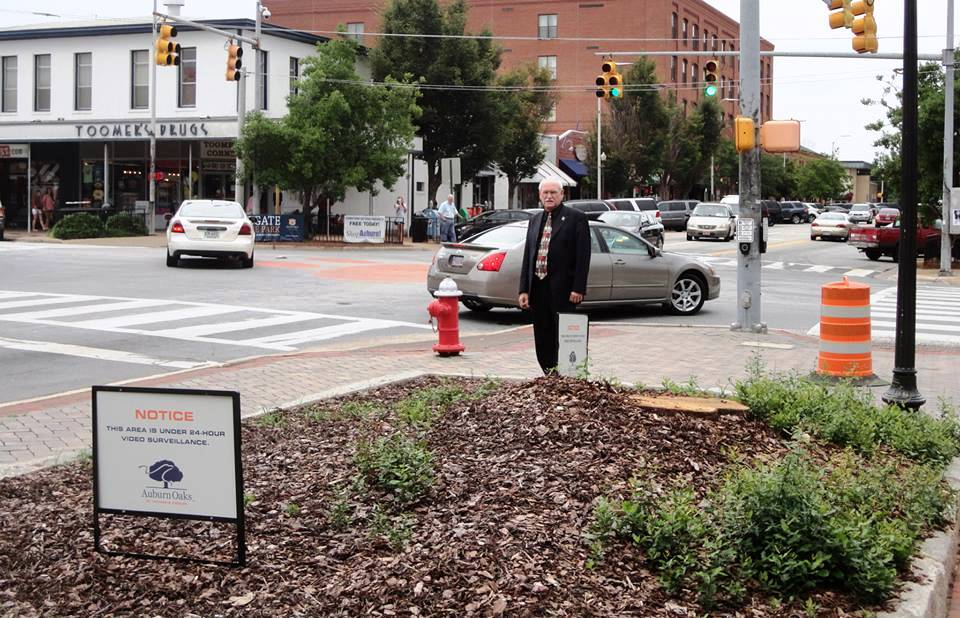
Toomer's Corner, at the intersection of College and Magnolia avenues in Auburn, Alabama, after the poisoned trees had been removed and the area placed under 24-hour surveillance

Auburn University and city police both launched investigations into the matter. Finebaum later reported that Federal authorities were also involved due to concerns of the herbicide having entered the groundwater. Both Auburn University President Jay Gogue and University of Alabama Athletic Director Mal Moore condemned this act.

Police traced the call to the home of Harvey Updyke Jr. of Dadeville. Updyke, a retired Texas state trooper, was taken into custody at 1:26 am CST on February 17, 2011, and charged with one count of criminal mischief, a class C felony in Alabama. On March 22, 2013, he received a 3-year split sentence, which includes 6 months' incarceration and jail credit for time already served. Upon release, Updyke was sentenced to 5 years' supervised probation with a 7 p.m. curfew. He was also prohibited from attending any collegiate sports event and banned from Auburn University property. The efforts made by the university to save the trees proved unsuccessful. "It came to a point where we realized it wasn't going to work, and the amount of poison in the ground was such that the trees were not going to survive," said Mike Clardy, Auburn University's Communications Director. The oak trees at Toomer's Corner were removed on April 23, 2013. On November 8, 2013, Circuit Judge Jacob A. Walker III ruled that Updyke (who had moved to Louisiana) owed Auburn University $796,731.98 in restitution, to be paid in installments of $500 per month. Auburn University sought more than $1 million in damages, the greater part of which was based on a soil-analysis estimate of $521,396.74 by the Alabama Department of Agriculture and Industries. Updyke was released to 5 years' supervised probation after having served 104 days of incarceration. He died from natural causes on July 30, 2020, at the age of 71.

On February 14, 2015, two 35-foot-tall live oaks were planted to replace the original oaks. The university requested that fans not roll the trees with toilet paper until the Fall 2016 season, to allow the trees to acclimate to their new environment. Despite this precaution, one of the two replacement trees died within a few months and was scheduled to be replaced yet again. Wood from the original oaks was fashioned into memorabilia, the profits going to a scholarship fund. The replacement tree fronting Magnolia Avenue was set on fire on September 25, 2016, during celebrations for Auburn's victory against LSU the previous night. As of October 2016, an assessment of the tree's health revealed that 60–70% of the canopy was dead, and prospects for the tree's survival were not favorable. The other tree fronting College Street, while not damaged by the fire, had failed to become properly established. In February 2017, two 30-foot-tall live oaks were planted to replace the two previous failing trees.

=== War Eagle ===
There are many stories surrounding the origins of Auburn's battle cry, "War Eagle." The most popular account involves the first Auburn football game in 1892 between Auburn and the University of Georgia. According to the story, in the stands that day was an old Civil War soldier with an eagle that he had found injured on a battlefield and kept as a pet. The eagle broke free and began to soar over the field, and Auburn began to march toward the Georgia end zone. The crowd began to chant "War Eagle" as the eagle soared. After Auburn won the game, the eagle crashed to the field and died, but according to the legend, his spirit lives on every time an Auburn man or woman yells "War Eagle!" The battle cry also functions as a greeting for those associated with the university. For many years, a live golden eagle has embodied the spirit of this tradition. The eagle was once housed on campus in The Eagle's Cage, but the aviary was taken down and the eagle moved to the nearby raptor center.

=== Wreck Tech Pajama Parade ===
The Wreck Tech Pajama Parade originated in 1896, when a group of mischievous Auburn ROTC cadets, determined to show up the better-known engineers from Georgia Tech, sneaked out of their dorms the night before the football game between Auburn and Tech and greased the railroad tracks. According to the story, the train carrying the Georgia Tech team slid through town and didn't stop until it was halfway to the neighboring town of Loachapoka, Alabama, The Georgia Tech team was forced to walk the five miles back to Auburn and, not surprisingly, were rather weary at the end of their journey. This likely contributed to their 45–0 loss. While the railroad long ago ceased to be the way teams traveled to Auburn and students never greased the tracks again, the tradition continues in the form of a parade through downtown Auburn. Students parade through the streets in their pajamas and organizations build floats. This tradition was renewed in 2005 with Georgia Tech returning to Auburn's schedule after nearly two decades of absence.

=== Rivals ===
Auburn's two traditional rivals are the University of Alabama and the University of Georgia. The stretch of games, at the end of the season, against these two schools is known as "Amen Corner". The Alabama Crimson Tide is the most heated rival, and this rivalry is considered to be one of the most intense in the country. Competitions between the schools are known as the Iron Bowl. Alabama holds the all-time edge with a record of 50 wins, 37 losses and 1 tie.

Georgia and Auburn compete in the Deep South's Oldest Rivalry, dating back to 1892. The game was played in Piedmont Park in Atlanta, Georgia. Georgia leads the series 64-56–8 as of the end of the 2023 season. It is one of the longest running and most played series in the NCAA.

Auburn also has a heated rivalry with the LSU Tigers, commonly referred to as the Tiger Classic. The two share more than just a nickname, as they have both enjoyed success in the SEC's Western Division. Auburn or LSU won at least a share of the SEC Western Division championship eight times between 2000 and 2011, and appeared in the SEC Championship game in seven of those years. Auburn won it outright in 2000, 2004, and 2010, LSU won it outright in 2007, 2011, and LSU won tiebreakers against Auburn in 2001 and 2005, and against Ole Miss in 2003. The only four times Auburn or LSU did not go to Atlanta during that span was 2002 when Arkansas won the three-way tie breaker with the two Tiger teams, in 2006 when Arkansas made it to Atlanta with a win over Auburn, and 2008 and 2009 when Alabama won the division.

Some of Auburn's former rivals included the Florida Gators, the Tennessee Volunteers, the Tulane Green Wave, and the Georgia Tech Yellow Jackets, each of which was mitigated (or, in the case of Georgia Tech, ended) with the SEC expansion and division restructuring, as well as past long series with the Clemson Tigers, the Texas Longhorns, and the Florida State Seminoles.

While basketball does not enjoy the same popularity as football at Auburn, the Iron Bowl of Basketball is very competitive. It is also popular for the halftime ceremony in which the Foy-ODK Sportsmanship Award is awarded to the school that won the football matchup earlier that academic year.

The baseball team also has in-state rivalries with the Samford Bulldogs and Troy Trojans.

==== Swimming and diving ====
Auburn's swimming and diving team has a fierce rivalry with Texas, as the two have combined for 17 NCAA National Titles since 1981 (9 for Texas, 8 for Auburn) and between 1999 and 2007 won every national title awarded. The two regularly face-off in a meet during the regular season, Auburn's men own a 12–9 record over the Longhorns. The women just recently began an annual series, with the Tigers winning the series so far 3–1. Texas was the only team to beat the Auburn men between 2001 and 2007.
