= Mel Rosen =

American track coach (1928–2018)

Biographical details
- Born: March 24, 1928; The Bronx, New York, U.S.
- Died: March 25, 2018 (aged 90); Auburn, Alabama, U.S.
- Education: University of Iowa

Playing career
- 1947–1950: Iowa Hawkeyes
- Position: Middle-distance runner

Coaching career (HC unless noted)
- 1956–1963: Auburn Tigers (assistant)
- 1964–1991: Auburn Tigers

Accomplishments and honors

Awards
- Alabama Sports Hall of Fame (1993); USA Track & Field Hall of Fame (1995); U.S. Track & Field and Cross Country Coaches Association Hall of Fame (2001); International Jewish Sports Hall of Fame (2004)

Melvin Rosen (March 24, 1928 – March 25, 2018) was an American track coach.

He was head coach of the Auburn University Tigers track team for 28 years, from 1963 to 1991, during which time the team won four consecutive Southeastern Conference (SEC) Indoor Track & Field Championships, from 1977 to 1980, and an outdoor track and field championship in 1979.

== Early life ==
Rosen was Jewish, was born in The Bronx, New York, and grew up in Brooklyn, New York. He graduated from the University of Iowa, where he was a middle-distance runner, in 1950.

== Coaching career ==
Rosen then coached at University of Iowa as an assistant for three years, while earning a master's degree and beginning work on a doctorate which he then continued to study for at Auburn. In addition, he served two years in the Army at Fort Benning, Georgia, where he was track coach for the post.

Rosen joined Auburn in 1955, as an assistant professor in the university's physical education department, and as an assistant track coach. He was in charge of the school's distance and relay teams until 1964, when he became head coach.

In 1978, Rosen was named the SEC and NCAA Coach of the Year, in both indoor and outdoor competition. That year his team placed second at the SEC outdoor, fifth at the NCAA outdoor, first at the SEC indoor, and second at the NCAA indoor meets. His teams finished in the top ten at both the NCAA indoor and outdoor championships for four consecutive years (1976–79). He was again named NCAA Indoor Coach of the Year in 1980, and SEC Indoor Coach of the Year in 1985.

During his coaching career he coached 7 Olympians and 143 All-Americans.

After the 1991 season, he left as Auburn's track coach to become head coach of the 1992 U.S. Men's Olympic Track Team. He had been assistant coach for the 1984 Olympic Team, and head coach of the 1987 Outdoor World Championships team.

Rosen was USA Track & Field men's track & field committee chairman. He was president of the track coaches association from 1978 to 1979.

To honor him and another former track coach, Auburn renamed its new track and field complex Hutsell-Rosen Track in 2006.

== Awards and inductions ==
Rosen was inducted as a member of the Alabama Sports Hall of Fame in 1993, and was inducted into the USA Track & Field Hall of Fame in 1995. He was inducted as a member of the U.S. Track & Field and Cross Country Coaches Association Hall of Fame in 2001. In 2004, he was inducted into the International Jewish Sports Hall of Fame.
