= Vern Wilson =

Australian rules footballer (1931–1993)

Personal information
- Full name: Vern Wilson
- Born: 27 March 1931
- Died: 27 January 1993 (aged 61)
- Original team: Footscray Colts
- Height: 175 cm (5 ft 9 in)
- Weight: 69 kg (152 lb)

Playing career^{1}
Years	Club	Games (Goals)
1948	Footscray	1 (0)
- ^{1} Playing statistics correct to the end of 1948.

Vern Wilson (27 March 1931 – 27 January 1993) was a former Australian rules footballer who played with Footscray in the Victorian Football League (VFL).
