= Marjorie Larney =

American athlete (born 1937)

Medal record

Women's athletics

Representing the United States

Pan American Games
Silver medal – second place	1959 Chicago	Javelin throw
Bronze medal – third place	1959 Chicago	Discus throw

Marjorie Lea Larney (born January 4, 1937, in Brooklyn, New York) is a retired American track and field athlete known for her great throwing arm. She represented the United States in the javelin throw at the 1952 Olympics, finishing 13th after being in 8th place after the qualifying round. She was only 15 years old at the time. She returned to the Olympics in 1956 to place 11th. Later she attended Queens College, and majored in Sociology & Anthropology. She won the National Championships in the javelin five times, in 1952 and 1957–60, as well as the 1952 Olympic Trials, by almost 3 meters (10 feet). She also won the National Championships in the discus throw in 1954 and was the first American in 1955. She represented the Queens Mercurettes for most of her career. She won a silver medal in the javelin and a bronze medal in the discus at the 1959 Pan American Games. She had finished out of the medals at the 1955 Pan American Games.

Larney served as in the US Peace Corps, teaching in Thailand, and later moved to Oakland, California, where she continued working to support youth in both Bangkok and Northern California. She has published 3 books: "The First Baton Rouge Youth Conservation Corps", "Josephine Miles, Teaching Poet: An Oral Biography", and "LGBT Youth Human Rights: Protecting the Human Rights of LGBT American Secondary School Students".

She continued throwing into Masters age groups, setting the American W50 records in the shot put and discus multiple times, finally at the 1987 TAC National Championships in Springfield, Oregon in 1987. Her discus record lasted until 1991, when it was improved by Vanessa Hilliard.
