= Price King =

American racewalker

Sloss Price King Jr. (March 6, 1925 – June 10, 2006) was an American racewalker who competed in the 1952 Summer Olympics.
