= Bruce MacDonald (athlete) =

American racewalker (1927–2020)

Personal information
- Full name: Bruce Duncan MacDonald
- Nationality: American
- Born: October 22, 1927
- Died: March 30, 2020 (aged 92)

Sport
- Sport: Athletics
- Event: Racewalking

Bruce Duncan MacDonald (October 22, 1927 – March 30, 2020) was an American racewalker. He competed at the 1956, 1960 and the 1964 Summer Olympics. He competed in his first Olympics at the age of 29. He worked four additional Olympics, two in the capacity of team manager and two more as an official.

Before his success as a race walker, he finished sixth in the 60 yard hurdles at the 1946 indoor national championships while competing for Bayside High School.

Following his first Olympic appearance, he started coaching, establishing the track and cross country program at Schreiber High School. He stayed there for 45 years. In 2015, at the age of 87, his uninsured house burned down. His former athletes gathered together to raise $70,000 for him.

MacDonald also won two golds at the first Masters National Outdoor Track & Field Champions in 1968 at San Diego. MacDonald was mentioned several times in the Ohio Racewalker magazine
