= Whitey Overton =

William Oliver "Whitey" Overton (born October 10, 1928, in Montgomery, Alabama - July 1, 2015 in Lancaster, Ohio) was an American track and field athlete known for the steeplechase. As a 19 year old at Alabama Polytechnic, he represented the United States at the 1948 Olympics. He finished a non-qualifying 6th place in the opening heats, running 10.14.4. The time was significantly inferior to his personal best of 9:26.0, set earlier in 1948. Overton's road to the Olympics was made more dramatic at the 1948 Olympic Trials when he hit the final barrier and fell. He was able to get back to his feet, sprint to the line and still finish ahead of Forest Efaw in 9:28.4.

A member of an athletic family, Whitey Overton was the nephew of Tom Oliver who played baseball for the Boston Red Sox in the 1920s and coached and scouted throughout baseball for the Philadelphia Phillies, and was the father of William Oliver "Bill" Overton Jr. who played representative rugby for five separate years for the Texas Rugby Union and club rugby for the Austin Huns Rugby Football Club from 1975 to 1984.
