= Cosmos Copa =

US amateur adult soccer tournament

- Founded: 2009
- Abolished: 2015
- Region: New York City
- Teams: 32
- Last champions: NYC Ireland (1st title)
- Most championships: NYC Poland (2 titles)
- Website: www.cosmoscopa.com

The Cosmos Copa, originally called Copa NYC, was an amateur adult soccer tournament played in New York City between teams representing different ethnic heritages in a World Cup-style competition.

== History ==
The competition was founded in 2009 by local soccer fans Spencer Dormitzer and Chris Noble. In 2010, the newly-established New York Cosmos took over the tournament, which continued to be run by its founders. The Copa was renamed for the professional club as part of the deal.

The tournament was "postponed" in 2016 and has not been held since.

== Format ==
In its most recent format, thirty-two teams competed in the Cosmos Copa. Teams were made up of amateur players over 18 years old and living in the Tri-State area, representing their national heritage; every player must either be from, or have parents who are from, the country they represent.

The format began with a round robin Group Stage, followed by a Round of 16, Quarterfinals, Semifinals and a Championship match.

== Winners ==
- 2009: NYC Albania
- 2010: NYC Poland
- 2011: NYC Poland
- 2012: NYC Haiti
- 2013: NYC France
- 2014: NYC Gambia
- 2015: NYC Ireland

== See also ==
- New York Cosmos
