= Dean Thackwray =

American long-distance runner

Personal information
- Born: March 7, 1933 Norwood, Massachusetts, United States
- Died: September 7, 2003 (aged 70) Manchester, New Hampshire, United States

Sport
- Sport: Long-distance running
- Event: Marathon

Dean Thackwray (March 7, 1933 – September 7, 2003) was an American long-distance runner. He competed in the marathon at the 1956 Summer Olympics. Dean Thackwray, a talented runner, secured his spot on the Olympic team by achieving a fifth-place finish at the Boston race, where he ranked as the third American participant. Additionally, he performed exceptionally well at the AAU race, coming in second. Thackwray represented both Boston University and the Boston Athletic Association during his running career.
