= James Hewson =

American racewalker

Personal information
- Full name: James Edward Hewson
- Nationality: American
- Born: March 15, 1918
- Died: October 17, 1978 (aged 60)

Sport
- Sport: Athletics
- Event: Racewalking

James Edward Hewson (March 15, 1918 – October 17, 1978) was an American racewalker and rower. He competed in the men's 20 kilometres walk at the 1956 Summer Olympics.

Hewson, a native of Buffalo, New York, was murdered during a robbery while he was working as a night bridge tender on the Black Rock Canal in Buffalo in 1978. He was inducted into the Greater Buffalo Sports Hall of Fame in 2018.
