= Charlie Capozzoli =

American long-distance runner

Charlie Capozzoli (19 June 1931 – 22 January 2013) was an American long-distance runner who competed in the 1952 Summer Olympics.
