= John Deni =

American racewalker

Personal information
- Full name: John Michael Deni
- Nationality: American
- Born: May 8, 1903
- Died: February 4, 1978 (aged 74)

Sport
- Sport: Athletics
- Event: Racewalking

John Michael Deni (May 8, 1903 – February 4, 1978) was an American racewalker. He competed in the men's 50 kilometres walk at the 1948 Summer Olympics and the 1952 Summer Olympics. He won 13 AAU walking championships. In 1937, he set the world record by completing the 20,000 meter walk in 1:08:55.
