= Leo Sjogren =

American racewalker

Personal information
- Full name: Leo Allan Sjogren
- Nationality: American
- Born: April 3, 1914
- Died: February 21, 1997 (aged 82)

Sport
- Sport: Athletics
- Event: Racewalking

Leo Allan Sjogren (April 3, 1914 – February 21, 1997) was an American racewalker. He competed in the men's 50 kilometres walk at the 1952 Summer Olympics and the 1956 Summer Olympics.
