= Adolf Weinacker =

American racewalker (1928–2023)

Personal information
- Born: October 29, 1928 Detroit, Michigan, U.S.
- Died: September 11, 2023 (aged 94)

Sport
- Sport: Athletics
- Event: Racewalking

Adolf Weinacker (October 29, 1928 – September 11, 2023) was an American racewalker. He competed in the men's 50 kilometres walk at the 1948, 1952 and the 1956 Summer Olympics. He died on September 11, 2023, at the age of 94.
