= 1957 South American Championships in Athletics (unofficial) – Results =

These are the results of the unofficial 1957 South American Championships in Athletics (known in Spanish as I Torneo de Campeones Sudamericanos) which took place at the Estadio Nacional in Santiago, Chile, on 19, 20 and 21 April. The athletics meeting was for men only with the participation from three countries Argentina, Brazil and Chile, each represented by two athletes in an event and points awarded for each place.

== Team scores ==
Rank	Country	Points
1	Brazil	223 pts
3	Chile	217 pts
2	Argentina	186 pts

== Results ==
=== 100 metres ===
Rank	Name	Nationality	Time	Notes
1st place, gold medalist(s)	Jorge de Barros	Brazil	10.6	
2nd place, silver medalist(s)	João Pires Sobrinho	Brazil	10.7	
3rd place, bronze medalist(s)	Gerardo Bönnhoff	Argentina	11.0	
4	Roberto Ferrario	Argentina	11.0	
5	Teodoro Blaschke	Chile	11.0	
6	Hugo de la Fuente	Chile	11.1	

=== 200 metres ===
Rank	Name	Nationality	Time	Notes
1st place, gold medalist(s)	João Pires Sobrinho	Brazil	21.6	
2nd place, silver medalist(s)	Jorge de Barros	Brazil	21.7	
3rd place, bronze medalist(s)	Teodoro Blaschke	Chile	22.2	
4	Hugo Krauss	Chile	22.3	
5	Pedro Marcel	Argentina	22.4	
6	Gerardo Bönnhoff	Argentina	22.4	

=== 400 metres ===
Rank	Name	Nationality	Time	Notes
1st place, gold medalist(s)	Ulisses dos Santos	Brazil	47.5	AR
2nd place, silver medalist(s)	Anubes da Silva	Brazil	48.2	
3rd place, bronze medalist(s)	Hugo Krauss	Chile	49.1	
4	Julio León	Chile	49.5	
5	Carlos Heredia	Argentina	49.5	
6	Enrique Beckles	Argentina	50.9	

=== 800 metres ===
Rank	Name	Nationality	Time	Notes
1st place, gold medalist(s)	Ramón Sandoval	Chile	1:50.4	
2nd place, silver medalist(s)	Argemiro Roque	Brazil	1:51.9	
3rd place, bronze medalist(s)	Waldo Sandoval	Chile	1:53.7	
4	Gilberto Miori	Argentina	1:54.6	
5	Alcides Cubitosi	Argentina	1:56.9	
6	Odilón Díaz	Brazil	1:57.3	

=== 1500 metres ===
Rank	Name	Nationality	Time	Notes
1st place, gold medalist(s)	Ramón Sandoval	Chile	3:48.4	
2nd place, silver medalist(s)	Eduardo Fontecilla	Chile	3:52.5	
3rd place, bronze medalist(s)	Gilberto Miori	Argentina	3:53.4	
4	Eduardo Balducci	Argentina	3:59.2	
5	Francisco Amaral	Brazil	4:06.3	
6	José Santos Primo	Brazil	4:15.7	

=== 5000 metres ===
Rank	Name	Nationality	Time	Notes
1st place, gold medalist(s)	Jorge González	Chile	14:50.4	
2nd place, silver medalist(s)	Jaime Correa	Chile	14:53.4	
3rd place, bronze medalist(s)	Armando Pino	Argentina	15:01.4	
4	José Calixto	Brazil	15:04.2	
5	Juan Guerra	Argentina	15:21.6	
6	Luís Rodrigues	Brazil	15:42.4	

=== 10,000 metres ===
Rank	Name	Nationality	Time	Notes
1st place, gold medalist(s)	Walter Lemos	Argentina	30:44.4	
2nd place, silver medalist(s)	Armando Pino	Argentina	30:50.2	
3rd place, bronze medalist(s)	José Calixto	Brazil	31:41.8	
4	Jaime Correa	Chile	32:05.8	
5	Alfredo de Oliveira	Brazil	32:16.4	
6	Manuel Salva	Chile	33:51.0	

=== Half marathon ===
Rank	Name	Nationality	Time	Notes
1st place, gold medalist(s)	Walter Lemos	Argentina	1:05:14	
2nd place, silver medalist(s)	Alfredo de Oliveira	Brazil	1:06:05	
3rd place, bronze medalist(s)	Juan Silva	Chile	1:08:20	
4	Humberto Bianchetti	Argentina	1:10:22	
5	José Pérez	Chile	1:10:45	
6	Nelson de Souza	Brazil	1:13:13	

=== 110 metres hurdles ===
Rank	Name	Nationality	Time	Notes
1st place, gold medalist(s)	Francisco Bergonzoni	Brazil	14.8	
2nd place, silver medalist(s)	Héctor Henríquez	Chile	15.3	
3rd place, bronze medalist(s)	Wilson Carneiro	Brazil	15.3	
4	Carlos Witting	Chile	15.4	
5	Carlos Cossi	Argentina	16.1	
6	Reinaldo Pieslinger	Argentina	16.5	

=== 400 metres hurdles ===
Rank	Name	Nationality	Time	Notes
1st place, gold medalist(s)	Ulisses dos Santos	Brazil	53.0	
2nd place, silver medalist(s)	Anubes da Silva	Brazil	54.0	
3rd place, bronze medalist(s)	Pablo Eitel	Chile	55.6	
4	Carlos Cossi	Argentina	55.9	
5	Humberto Cabrera	Argentina	57.0	
6	Ariel Standen	Chile	58.9	

=== 3000 metres steeplechase ===
Rank	Name	Nationality	Time	Notes
1st place, gold medalist(s)	Antonio Núñez	Argentina	9:27.8	
2nd place, silver medalist(s)	Santiago Novas	Chile	9:30.2	
3rd place, bronze medalist(s)	José Santos Primo	Brazil	9:37.4	
4	Francisco Allen	Chile	9:56.6	
5	Eusebio Urquiza	Argentina	10:02.6	
6	Francisco Amaral	Brazil	10:25.0	

=== 4 × 100 metres relay ===
Rank	Nation	Competitors	Time	Notes
1st place, gold medalist(s)	Brazil	João Pires Sobrinho, José Telles da Conceição, Da Silva, Jorge de Barros	41.4	
2nd place, silver medalist(s)	Argentina	Pedro Marcel, Juan Ferro, Gerardo Bönnhoff, Roberto Ferrario	41.6	
3rd place, bronze medalist(s)	Chile	Hugo de la Fuente, Teodoro Blaschke, Patricio Letelier, Gert Wagner	42.0	

=== 4 × 400 metres relay ===
Rank	Nation	Competitors	Time	Notes
1st place, gold medalist(s)	Brazil	Argemiro Roque, Da Silva, Anubes da Silva, Ulisses dos Santos	3:15.0	
2nd place, silver medalist(s)	Chile	Julio León, Waldo Sandoval, Ramón Sandoval, Hugo Krauss	3:18.9	
3rd place, bronze medalist(s)	Argentina	Humberto Cabrer, Enrique Beckles, Francisco Paganessi, Carlos Heredia	3:21.4	

=== High jump ===
Rank	Name	Nationality	Result	Notes
1st place, gold medalist(s)	Ernesto Lagos	Chile	1.93	
2nd place, silver medalist(s)	Horacio Martínez	Argentina	1.90	
3rd place, bronze medalist(s)	José Telles da Conceição	Brazil	1.85	
3rd place, bronze medalist(s)	Juan Ruiz	Chile	1.85	
3rd place, bronze medalist(s)	Oscar Bártoli	Argentina	1.85	
6	Alberto Bacan	Brazil	1.85	

=== Pole vault ===
Rank	Name	Nationality	Result	Notes
1st place, gold medalist(s)	Fausto de Souza	Brazil	4.10	
2nd place, silver medalist(s)	José Luis Infante	Chile	4.00	
3rd place, bronze medalist(s)	Ricardo Bonino	Chile	3.80	
4	Itiro Takahashi	Brazil	3.70	
5	Christián Raab	Chile	3.70	
6	Emir Martínez	Argentina	3.30	

=== Long jump ===
Rank	Name	Nationality	Result	Notes
1st place, gold medalist(s)	Eduardo Krumm	Chile	6.96	
2nd place, silver medalist(s)	Pedro Marcel	Argentina	6.90	
3rd place, bronze medalist(s)	Wladimiro Leighton	Chile	6.86	
4	Luís Akuta	Brazil	6.78	
5	Jorge Castillo	Argentina	6.78	
6	Masaki Umeda	Brazil	6.77	

=== Triple jump ===
Rank	Name	Nationality	Result	Notes
1st place, gold medalist(s)	Adhemar da Silva	Brazil	15.59	
2nd place, silver medalist(s)	Ariel Standen	Chile	14.60	
3rd place, bronze medalist(s)	Jorge Castillo	Argentina	14.36	
4	Arnaldo dos Santos	Brazil	14.29	
5	Eugenio Muñoz	Chile	14.18	
6	Raúl Castagnino	Argentina	13.73	

=== Shot put ===
Rank	Name	Nationality	Result	Notes
1st place, gold medalist(s)	Enrique Helf	Argentina	14.56	
2nd place, silver medalist(s)	Isolino Taborda	Brazil	14.47	
3rd place, bronze medalist(s)	Günther Kruse	Argentina	14.38	
4	Nadim Marreis	Brazil	14.18	
5	Leonardo Kittsteiner	Chile	13.86	
6	Fernando Morales	Chile	13.42	

=== Discus throw ===
Rank	Name	Nationality	Result	Notes
1st place, gold medalist(s)	Günther Kruse	Argentina	48.25	
2nd place, silver medalist(s)	Hernán Haddad	Chile	47.41	
3rd place, bronze medalist(s)	Dieter Gevert	Chile	44.07	
4	Nadim Marreis	Brazil	42.05	
5	Enrique Helf	Argentina	39.88	
6	Walter da Costa	Brazil	38.43	

=== Hammer throw ===
Rank	Name	Nationality	Result	Notes
1st place, gold medalist(s)	Bruno Strohmeier	Brazil	54.45	
2nd place, silver medalist(s)	Arturo Melcher	Chile	51.44	
3rd place, bronze medalist(s)	Alejandro Díaz	Chile	50.37	
4	Walter da Costa	Brazil	47.34	
5	Manuel Etchepare	Argentina	45.85	
6	Juan Fusé	Argentina	45.75	

=== Javelin throw ===
*Old model

Rank	Name	Nationality	Result	Notes
1st place, gold medalist(s)	Ricardo Héber	Argentina	66.54	
2nd place, silver medalist(s)	Nelson Matteucci	Argentina	64.57	
3rd place, bronze medalist(s)	Juris Laipenieks	Chile	61.10	
4	Fernando Ceballos	Chile	60.04	
5	Walter de Almeida	Brazil	56.77	
6	Aldo Ribeiro	Brazil	49.24	

=== Decathlon ===
20–21 April – 1952 tables

Rank	Name	Nationality	Result	Notes
1st place, gold medalist(s)	Hernán Figueroa	Chile	5492	
2nd place, silver medalist(s)	Oscar Bártoli	Argentina	5321	
3rd place, bronze medalist(s)	Leonardo Kittsteiner	Chile	5310	
4	Aldo Ribeiro	Brazil	5095	
5	Rúbens Habesh	Brazil	4959	
6	Ricardo Héber	Argentina	4884	
