= 1956 South American Championships in Athletics – Results =

These are the results of the 1956 South American Championships in Athletics which took place at the Estadio Nacional in Santiago, Chile, between 14 and 22 April. Only the top 6 athletes have been reported for some finals.

== Men's results ==
=== 100 metres ===
Heats – 14 April

Rank	Heat	Name	Nationality	Time	Notes
1	1	Paulo da Fonseca	Brazil	10.7	Q
2	1	Gerardo Bönnhoff	Argentina	11.0	Q
3	1	Antonio Vanegas	Colombia	11.2	Q
4	1	Fermín Donazar	Uruguay	11.2	
5	1	Pedro Araguin	Ecuador	11.7	
1	2	João Pires Sobrinho	Brazil	10.7	Q
2	2	Teodoro Blaschke	Chile	10.9	Q
3	2	Roberto Ferrario	Argentina	11.0	Q
4	2	Gerardo Salazar	Peru	11.0	
5	2	José Ravell	Uruguay	11.2	
6	2	Guillermo Martínez	Ecuador	11.7	
1	3	Jorge de Barros	Brazil	10.9	Q
2	3	Hugo de la Fuente	Chile	11.1	Q
3	3	Guillermo Sebastiani	Peru	11.1	Q
4	3	Arturo Flores	Ecuador	11.2	
5	3	Gilberto Truque	Colombia	11.2	
1	4	Luis Vienna	Argentina	10.7	Q
2	4	Ciro Braceiro	Uruguay	10.9	Q
3	4	Enrique Stewart	Peru	11.0	Q
4	4	Jorge Pérez	Chile	11.0	
5	4	Constantino Fascie	Colombia	11.3	

Semifinals – 14 April

Rank	Heat	Name	Nationality	Time	Notes
1	1	João Pires Sobrinho	Brazil	10.6	Q
2	1	Luis Vienna	Argentina	10.7	Q
3	1	Hugo de la Fuente	Chile	10.8	Q
4	1	Guillermo Sebastiani	Peru	10.9	
5	1	Ciro Braceiro	Uruguay	10.9	
	1	Roberto Ferrario	Argentina	DQ	FS
1	2	Paulo da Fonseca	Brazil	10.8	Q
2	2	Gerardo Bönnhoff	Argentina	10.9	Q
3	2	Teodoro Blaschke	Chile	10.9	Q
4	2	Antonio Vanegas	Colombia	?	
	2	Enrique Stewart	Peru	?	
	2	Jorge de Barros	Brazil	?	

Final – 15 April

Rank	Lane	Name	Nationality	Time	Notes
1st place, gold medalist(s)	2	Paulo da Fonseca	Brazil	10.6	
2nd place, silver medalist(s)	3	Gerardo Bönnhoff	Argentina	10.7	
3rd place, bronze medalist(s)	5	João Pires Sobrinho	Brazil	10.7	
4	1	Luis Vienna	Argentina	10.7	
5	4	Teodoro Blaschke	Chile	10.8	
6	6	Hugo de la Fuente	Chile	12.0	

=== 200 metres ===
Heats – 17 April

Rank	Heat	Name	Nationality	Time	Notes
1	1	Gerardo Bönnhoff	Argentina	21.8	Q
2	1	Guillermo Sebastiani	Peru	21.9	Q
3	1	Teodoro Blaschke	Chile	22.0	Q
4	1	Paulo da Fonseca	Brazil	22.1	
5	1	José Ravell	Uruguay	22.6	
1	2	Armando da Silva	Brazil	21.8	Q
2	2	Jaime Aparicio	Colombia	22.0	Q
3	2	Juan Ferro	Argentina	22.2	Q
4	2	Jorge Velásquez	Peru	22.8	
5	2	Óscar Nietzel	Uruguay	22.9	
6	2	Guillermo Martínez	Ecuador	23.8	
1	3	Hugo Krauss	Chile	22.3	Q
2	3	Wilfredo Sanguinetti	Peru	22.3	Q
3	3	Rodolfo Beltrán	Argentina	22.8	Q
4	3	Carlos Sierra	Colombia	22.8	
5	3	Pedro Araguin	Ecuador	23.5	
1	4	João Pires Sobrinho	Brazil	21.8	Q
2	4	Ciro Braceiro	Uruguay	22.1	Q
3	4	Arturo Flores	Ecuador	22.3	Q
4	4	Antonio Vanegas	Colombia	22.3	
5	4	Jorge Pérez	Chile	22.5	

Semifinals – 17 April

Rank	Heat	Name	Nationality	Time	Notes
1	1	Gerardo Bönnhoff	Argentina	21.7	Q
2	1	Armando da Silva	Brazil	21.8	Q
3	1	Arturo Flores	Ecuador	22.1	Q
4	1	Teodoro Blaschke	Chile	22.1	
5	1	Rodolfo Beltrán	Argentina	22.3	
6	1	Wilfredo Sanguinetti	Peru	22.3	
1	2	João Pires Sobrinho	Brazil	21.7	Q
2	2	Jaime Aparicio	Colombia	21.7	Q
3	2	Guillermo Sebastiani	Peru	22.2	Q
4	2	Ciro Braceiro	Uruguay	22.2	
	2	Juan Ferro	Argentina	?	
	2	Hugo Krauss	Chile	?	

Final – 19 April

Rank	Name	Nationality	Time	Notes
1st place, gold medalist(s)	João Pires Sobrinho	Brazil	21.5	
2nd place, silver medalist(s)	Jaime Aparicio	Colombia	21.7	
3rd place, bronze medalist(s)	Gerardo Bönnhoff	Argentina	21.8	
4	Guillermo Sebastiani	Peru	21.9	
5	Armando da Silva	Brazil	22.0	
6	Arturo Flores	Ecuador	22.2	

=== 400 metres ===
Heats – 14 April

Rank	Heat	Name	Nationality	Time	Notes
1	1	Hugo Krauss	Chile	50.0	Q
2	1	Carlos Pereira	Uruguay	50.0	Q
3	1	Carlos Sierra	Colombia	50.0	
4	1	Rodolfo Bertrán	Argentina	50.1	
5	1	Mário do Nascimento	Brazil	50.2	
6	1	Jorge O'Brien	Peru	52.5	
1	2	Jaime Aparicio	Colombia	48.8	Q
2	2	Ulisses dos Santos	Brazil	49.2	Q
3	2	Juan Carlos Acosta	Argentina	49.3	
4	2	Carmelo Peña	Chile	50.5	
5	2	Óscar Nielsen	Uruguay	51.2	
6	2	José Laca	Peru	52.5	
1	3	Zados Guardiola	Colombia	48.5	Q
2	3	Argemiro Roque	Brazil	49.3	Q
3	3	Eulogio Gómez	Peru	49.5	
4	3	Herbert Echerry	Uruguay	50.5	
5	3	Oscar Delori	Argentina	51.2	
6	3	Gustavo Tapia	Chile	51.2	

Final – 15 April

Rank	Lane	Name	Nationality	Time	Notes
1st place, gold medalist(s)	6	Jaime Aparicio	Colombia	47.7	CR
2nd place, silver medalist(s)	2	Zados Guardiola	Colombia	48.2	
3rd place, bronze medalist(s)	3	Argemiro Roque	Brazil	49.0	
4	1	Ulisses dos Santos	Brazil	49.4	
5	5	Carlos Pereira	Uruguay	49.7	
6	4	Hugo Krauss	Chile	50.4	

=== 800 metres ===
19 April

Rank	Name	Nationality	Time	Notes
1st place, gold medalist(s)	Ramón Sandoval	Chile	1:49.0	AR
2nd place, silver medalist(s)	Eduardo Balducci	Argentina	1:51.5	NR
3rd place, bronze medalist(s)	Argemiro Roque	Brazil	1:52.4	NR
4	Waldo Sandoval	Chile	1:52.4	
5	Eduardo Fontecilla	Chile	1:54.0	
6	Sebastião Mendes	Brazil	1:54.3	
	Odilon Dias Netto	Brazil	NT	
	Albano Arízar	Colombia	NT	
	Jorge O'Brien	Peru	NT	
	Juan López	Peru	NT	
	Orlando Arévalo	Uruguay	NT	
	Emir Miller	Uruguay	NT	
	Carlos Pereira	Uruguay	NT	

=== 1500 metres ===
15 April

Rank	Name	Nationality	Time	Notes
1st place, gold medalist(s)	Ramón Sandoval	Chile	3:48.4	AR
2nd place, silver medalist(s)	Eduardo Balducci	Argentina	3:53.4	
3rd place, bronze medalist(s)	Waldo Sandoval	Chile	3:54.5	
4	Sebastião Mendes	Brazil	3:55.2	
5	Eduardo Fontecilla	Chile	3:57.6	
6	Antônio Roque	Brazil	4:01.3	
	Albano Arízar	Colombia	NT	
	Orlando Arévalo	Uruguay	NT	
	Juan Miranda	Argentina	DNF	

=== 5000 metres ===
14 April

Rank	Name	Nationality	Time	Notes
1st place, gold medalist(s)	Osvaldo Suárez	Argentina	14:30.8	CR
2nd place, silver medalist(s)	Jaime Correa	Chile	14:47.8	
3rd place, bronze medalist(s)	Walter Lemos	Argentina	14:51.7	
4	Santiago Novas	Chile	15:10.4	
5	Luís Rodrigues	Brazil	15:11.8	
6	Jorge González	Chile	15:17.4	
	Juan Guerra	Argentina	NT	
	Laudinor da Silva	Brazil	NT	
	Edgar Freire	Brazil	NT	
	Albérico Correa	Uruguay	NT	
	Segundo Torres	Peru	NT	
	Luis Paredes	Peru	NT	
	Wenceslao Bárzola	Peru	NT	

=== 10,000 metres ===
19 April

Rank	Name	Nationality	Time	Notes
1st place, gold medalist(s)	Osvaldo Suárez	Argentina	30:12.2	CR
2nd place, silver medalist(s)	Walter Lemos	Argentina	30:27.4	
3rd place, bronze medalist(s)	Alfredo de Oliveira	Brazil	31:41.0	
4	João dos Santos	Brazil	31:47.2	
5	Armando Pino	Argentina	32:09.8	
6	Haroldo Gallardo	Chile	32:26.2	
	Armando Terán	Ecuador	NT	
	Segundo Torres	Peru	NT	
	Luis Paredes	Peru	NT	
	Wenceslao Bárzola	Peru	NT	
	Albérico Correa	Uruguay	NT	
	Jaime Correa	Chile	DNF	
	Jorge González	Chile	DNF	

=== Half marathon ===
22 April

Rank	Name	Nationality	Time	Notes
1st place, gold medalist(s)	Osvaldo Suárez	Argentina	1:08:54	CR
2nd place, silver medalist(s)	Walter Lemos	Argentina	1:09:00	
3rd place, bronze medalist(s)	Juan Silva	Chile	1:10:31	
4	Armando Pino	Argentina	1:10:57	
5	Alfredo de Oliveira	Brazil	1:11:06	
6	Luís Rodrigues	Brazil	1:12:32	
7	Alfonso Cornejo	Chile	NT	
8	João dos Santos	Brazil	NT	
9	Luis Paredes	Peru	NT	
10	Wenceslao Bárzola	Peru	NT	
11	Segundo Torres	Peru	NT	
12	Armando Terán	Ecuador	NT	
13	José Elías Pérez	Chile	NT	

=== 110 metres hurdles ===
Heats – 15 April

Rank	Heat	Name	Nationality	Time	Notes
1	1	Estanislao Kocourek	Argentina	15.1	Q
2	1	Francisco Bergonzoni	Brazil	15.2	Q
3	1	Carlos Witting	Chile	15.2	
4	1	Luis Huarcaya	Peru	15.3	
1	2	Guillermo Zapata	Colombia	15.3	Q
2	2	Ubaldo Kuntze	Argentina	15.3	Q
3	2	Ary de Sá	Brazil	15.4	
4	2	Héctor Henriquez	Chile	15.6	
5	2	Alfredo Estavillo	Uruguay	16.1	
1	3	Ijoel da Silva	Brazil	15.0	Q
2	3	Ariel Standen	Chile	16.2	Q
	3	Eduardo Laca	Peru	DNF	

Final – 17 April

Rank	Lane	Name	Nationality	Time	Notes
1st place, gold medalist(s)	4	Ijoel da Silva	Brazil	14.7	
2nd place, silver medalist(s)	5	Estanislao Kocourek	Argentina	14.9	
3rd place, bronze medalist(s)	4	Francisco Bergonzoni	Brazil	15.1	
4	6	Ubaldo Kuntze	Argentina	15.3	
5	2	Guillermo Zapata	Colombia	15.5	
6	1	Ariel Standen	Chile	15.7	

=== 400 metres hurdles ===
Heats – 19 April

Rank	Heat	Name	Nationality	Time	Notes
1	1	Jaime Aparicio	Colombia	54.1	Q
2	1	Anubes da Silva	Brazil	54.8	Q
3	1	Roberto van Megrott	Argentina	56.7	
4	1	Hugo Sepúlveda	Chile	56.9	
1	2	Pablo Eitel	Chile	54.6	Q
2	2	Zados Guardiola	Colombia	55.7	Q
3	2	Ubaldo Kuntze	Argentina	56.3	
4	2	Emir Millier	Uruguay	57.6	
5	2	Jorge Miranda	Peru	57.7	
6	2	Francisco Bergonzoni	Brazil	1:00.4	
1	3	Guillermo Zapata	Colombia	55.4	Q
2	3	Ulisses dos Santos	Brazil	55.7	Q
3	3	Heber Etcheverry	Uruguay	56.6	
4	3	Ariel Standen	Chile	57.3	

Final – 21 April

Rank	Name	Nationality	Time	Notes
1st place, gold medalist(s)	Jaime Aparicio	Colombia	52.0	CR
2nd place, silver medalist(s)	Zados Guardiola	Colombia	53.1	
3rd place, bronze medalist(s)	Anubes da Silva	Brazil	54.2	
4	Pablo Eitel	Chile	54.4	
5	Ulisses dos Santos	Brazil	54.8	
6	Guillermo Zapata	Colombia	58.3	

=== 3000 metres steeplechase ===
21 April

Rank	Name	Nationality	Time	Notes
1st place, gold medalist(s)	Santiago Novas	Chile	9:09.0	AR
2nd place, silver medalist(s)	Sebastião Mendes	Brazil	9:17.4	
3rd place, bronze medalist(s)	Guillermo Solá	Chile	9:25.8	
4	Haroldo Gallardo	Chile	9:32.2	
5	Edgar Freire	Brazil	9:58.4	
6	Viterbo Rivero	Uruguay	10:02.6	
	Rolando Subirós	Argentina	NT	
	Armando Terán	Ecuador	NT	

=== 4 × 100 metres relay ===
Heats – 19 April

Rank	Lane	Nation	Competitors	Time	Notes
1	1	Argentina	Luis Vienna, Roberto Ferrario, Gerardo Bönnhoff, Juan Carlos Acosta	42.0	Q
2	1	Uruguay	Fermín Donazar, José Ravell, Óscar Nietzel, Carlos Pereira	42.8	Q
	1	Peru	Gerardo Salazar, Enrique Stewart, Guillermo Sebastiani, Wilfredo Sanguinetti	DQ	
1	2	Chile	Teodoro Blaschke, Eduardo Bezanilla, Jorge Pérez, Patricio Letelier	42.4	Q
2	2	Colombia	Gilberto Truque, Constantin Fascie, Antonio Venegas, Aristipo Lerma	42.4	Q
3	2	Brazil	João Pires Sobrinho, Jorge de Barros, Paulo da Fonseca, Armando da Silva	43.7	Q
	2	Ecuador	Arturo Flores, Guillermo Martínez, Pedro Araguin, N. Alvarado	DQ	

Final – 21 April

Rank	Nation	Competitors	Time	Notes
1st place, gold medalist(s)	Brazil	João Pires Sobrinho, Jorge de Barros, Paulo da Fonseca, Armando da Silva	41.4	
2nd place, silver medalist(s)	Argentina	Gerardo Bönnhoff, Luis Vienna, Roberto Ferrario, Juan Carlos Acosta	41.5	
3rd place, bronze medalist(s)	Colombia	Gilberto Truque, Constantin Fascie, Antonio Venegas, Aristipo Lerma	42.6	
4	Uruguay	Fermín Donazar, José Ravell, Óscar Nietzel, Carlos Pereira	43.0	
	Chile		DQ	

=== 4 × 400 metres relay ===
22 April

Rank	Nation	Competitors	Time	Notes
1st place, gold medalist(s)	Colombia	Jaime Aparicio, Zados Guardiola, Carlos Sierra, Antonio Vanegas	3:14.6	AR
2nd place, silver medalist(s)	Brazil	Argemiro Roque, Mário do Nascimento, Anubes da Silva, Armando da Silva	3:16.1	
3rd place, bronze medalist(s)	Argentina	Rodolfo Beltrán, Juan Carlos Acosta, Gerardo Bönnhoff, Eduardo Balducci	3:16.8	
4	Chile	Hugo Krauss, Waldo Sandoval, Ramón Sandoval, Pablo Eitel	3:17.3	
5	Peru	Eulogio Gómez, Jorge O'Brien, José Laca, Juan López	3:19.1	
6	Uruguay	José Ravell, Carlos Pereira, Heber Etcheverry, Emir Miller	3:24.8	

=== High jump ===
14 April

Rank	Name	Nationality	Result	Notes
1st place, gold medalist(s)	Oscar Bártoli	Argentina	1.93	
2nd place, silver medalist(s)	Ernesto Lagos	Chile	1.90	
3rd place, bronze medalist(s)	Juan Ruiz	Chile	1.85	
3rd place, bronze medalist(s)	Alberto Bacan	Brazil	1.85	
5	Horacio Martínez	Argentina	1.85	
6	Sergio Montes	Chile	1.85	
7	Hajime Nakajima	Brazil	1.80	
7	Luis Huarcaya	Peru	1.80	
7	Odilon Dias Netto	Brazil	1.80	
10	Roberto Vázquez	Argentina	1.75	
11	Carlos Guarderas	Ecuador	1.70	
11	Martín Richtenberg	Uruguay	1.70	

=== Pole vault ===
17 April

Rank	Name	Nationality	Result	Notes
1st place, gold medalist(s)	José Luis Infante	Chile	3.90	
2nd place, silver medalist(s)	Gonzalo Rojas	Chile	3.90	
3rd place, bronze medalist(s)	Fausto de Souza	Brazil	3.90	
4	Roberto Argachá	Argentina	3.90	
5	Cristián Raab	Chile	3.80	
6	Carlos Oralde	Uruguay	3.70	
7	César Santini	Argentina	3.70	
8	Octávio Mariotto	Brazil	3.60	
9	Itiro Takahashi	Brazil	3.50	

=== Long jump ===
15 April

Rank	Name	Nationality	#1	#2	#3	#4	#5	#6	Result	Notes
1st place, gold medalist(s)	Fermín Donazar	Uruguay				x	7.23		7.23	
2nd place, silver medalist(s)	Ary de Sá	Brazil	7.14	–	–	6.94	6.83	6.94	7.14	
3rd place, bronze medalist(s)	Luís Akuta	Brazil				x	x	x	7.10	
4	Ahylton da Conceiçao	Brazil							7.05	
5	Albino Geist	Argentina							6.95	
6	Carlos Vera	Chile							6.79	

=== Triple jump ===
19 April

Rank	Name	Nationality	Result	Notes
1st place, gold medalist(s)	Jorgely Figueira	Brazil	15.14	
2nd place, silver medalist(s)	Luis Huarcaya	Peru	14.69	
3rd place, bronze medalist(s)	Carlos Vera	Chile	14.63	
4	Luís Akuta	Brazil	14.47	
5	Renato do Nascimento	Brazil	14.34	
6	Eugenio Muñoz	Chile	14.10	

=== Shot put ===
15 April

Rank	Name	Nationality	#1	#2	#3	#4	#5	#6	Result	Notes
1st place, gold medalist(s)	Alcides Dambrós	Brazil	14.52	14.77	14.97	14.72	14.77	x	14.97	
2nd place, silver medalist(s)	Rubén Scaraffia	Argentina	14.72						14.72	
3rd place, bronze medalist(s)	Günther Kruse	Argentina							13.97	
4	Nadim Marreis	Brazil							13.82	
5	Armin Nevermann	Chile							13.80	
6	Isolino Taborda	Brazil							13.78	
	Leonardo Kittsteiner	Chile							13.5?	
	Fernando Morales	Chile							13.??	

=== Discus throw ===
21 April

Rank	Name	Nationality	#1	#2	#3	#4	#5	#6	Result	Notes
1st place, gold medalist(s)	Günther Kruse	Argentina	47.61	47.22	46.62	40.82	41.68	47.58	47.61	CR
2nd place, silver medalist(s)	Hernán Haddad	Chile	47.24						47.24	
3rd place, bronze medalist(s)	Pedro Ucke	Argentina							46.56	
4	Eduardo Julve	Peru							45.49	
5	Elvio Porta	Argentina							44.17	
6	Dieter Gevert	Chile							42.43	
7	Manuel Fernández	Peru							41.56	
8	Nadim Marreis	Brazil							41.39	
9	Héctor Menacho	Peru							40.03	
10	Walter Yaeger	Chile							39.63	
11	Walter da Costa	Brazil							39.61	
12	Enrique Vázquez	Uruguay							37.91	

=== Hammer throw ===
17 April

Rank	Name	Nationality	#1	#2	#3	#4	#5	#6	Result	Notes
1st place, gold medalist(s)	Alejandro Díaz	Chile	52.88						52.88	
2nd place, silver medalist(s)	Edmundo Zúñiga	Chile	x	50.69	50.76	50.81	51.71	50.11	51.71	
3rd place, bronze medalist(s)	Elvio Porta	Argentina	47.48	48.81	49.64	x	51.55	48.05	51.55	
4	Walter da Costa	Brazil	50.38						50.38	
5	Arturo Melcher	Chile							49.58	
6	Walter Kupper	Brazil							49.55	
7	Enrique Vázquez	Uruguay							44.59	
8	Haroldo Guimarães	Brazil							43.46	
9	Manuel Etchepare	Argentina							43.24	

=== Javelin throw ===
14 April – old model

Rank	Name	Nationality	#1	#2	#3	#4	#5	#6	Result	Notes
1st place, gold medalist(s)	Ricardo Héber	Argentina	58.59	60.80	64.18	62.33	64.45	58.55	64.45	
2nd place, silver medalist(s)	Néstor Matteucci	Argentina		61.51					61.51	
3rd place, bronze medalist(s)	Carlos Monge	Peru							59.20	
4	Fernando Ceballos	Chile				58.72			58.72	
5	Janis Stendzeniecks	Chile	52.14	58.34	x	56.13	57.85	57.58	58.34	
6	Osmar Duque	Brazil							56.40	
7	Manoel da Silva	Brazil							55.92	
8	Mar Núñez	Chile							55.87	
9	Hans Hillmann	Peru							54.71	
10	Jorge Tostirelli	Argentina							54.65	
11	Orlando Couto	Brazil							52.90	

=== Decathlon ===
21–22 April – 1952 tables (1985 conversions given with *)

The highest mark recorded in each event is highlighted in yellow

Rank	Athlete	Nationality	100m	LJ	SP	HJ	400m	110m H	DT	PV	JT	1500m	Points	Conv.	Notes
1st place, gold medalist(s)	Héctor Menacho	Peru	11.4	6.14	12.39	1.65	51.5	16.3	42.93	3.10	42.71	4:43.8	5671	6132*	
2nd place, silver medalist(s)	Leonardo Kittsteiner	Chile	11.7	6.11	14.19	1.67	52.4	16.3	33.73	3.00	51.57	4:54.3	5499	6007*	
3rd place, bronze medalist(s)	Aldo Ribeiro	Brazil	11.4	6.18	10.70	1.74	52.5	15.8	31.48	3.20	47.88	4:54.8	5401	5926*	
4	Oscar Bártoli	Argentina	12.1	6.49	10.99	1.95	54.3	17.2	35.21	3.20	48.32	4:52.0	5364	5930*	
5	Luís Fernandes	Brazil	11.6	6.05	9.77	1.65	52.5	16.2	31.34	3.20	42.15	4:26.2	5211	5777*	
6	Ary de Sá	Brazil	11.0	6.88	10.04	1.72	54.7	16.0	28.20	3.00	43.07	5:20.2	5110	5674*	
7	Roberto Vásquez	Argentina	12.3	6.16	11.33	1.87	54.9	17.2	35.28	3.20	43.68	5:05.8	4937	5597*	
8	Emir Martínez	Argentina	11.6	6.19	12.14	1.65	1:01.1	17.9	37.61	3.20	45.37	4:43.7	4871	5512*	
9	Raúl Osorio	Chile	11.7	6.12	10.42	1.70	51.8	17.3	30.23	3.10	45.93	DNF	4630	5006*	
	Hernán Figueroa	Chile	12.0	5.53	11.58	1.75	59.5	?	33.72	?	–	–	DNF	–	

== Women's results ==
=== 100 metres ===
Heats – 14 April

Rank	Heat	Name	Nationality	Time	Notes
1	1	Gladys Erbetta	Argentina	12.2	Q, =CR
2	1	Hannelore Poetscher	Brazil	12.8	Q
3	1	Teresa Venegas	Chile	13.0	
4	1	Dora Sánchez	Peru	13.4	
1	2	Eliana Gaete	Chile	12.5	Q
2	2	Martha Huby	Peru	12.6	Q
3	2	Edith Berg	Argentina	12.7	
4	2	Marlene Santos	Brazil	13.0	
1	3	Lilián Buglia	Argentina	12.2	Q, =CR
2	3	Beatriz Kretschmer	Chile	12.6	Q
3	3	Wanda dos Santos	Brazil	13.0	
4	3	Edelma Gutiérrez	Uruguay	13.3	
5	3	Elsa Campos	Peru	13.4	

Final – 15 April

Rank	Lane	Name	Nationality	Time	Notes
1st place, gold medalist(s)	2	Gladys Erbetta	Argentina	12.2	=CR
2nd place, silver medalist(s)	4	Beatriz Kretschmer	Chile	12.4	
3rd place, bronze medalist(s)	6	Eliana Gaete	Chile	12.4	
4	5	Martha Huby	Peru	12.6	
5	3	Hannelore Poetscher	Brazil	12.7	
	1	Lilián Buglia	Argentina	DNF	

=== 200 metres ===
Heats – 17 April

Rank	Heat	Name	Nationality	Time	Notes
1	1	Martha Huby	Peru	26.3	Q
2	1	Teresa Venegas	Chile	26.4	Q
3	1	Maria José de Lima	Brazil	27.3	
1	2	Hannelore Poetscher	Brazil	26.5	Q
2	2	Olga Bianchi	Argentina	26.5	Q
3	2	Patricia Rodoni	Chile	26.8	
4	2	Edelma Gutiérrez	Uruguay	26.8	
5	2	Rosa Sánchez	Peru	28.2	
1	3	Gladys Erbetta	Argentina	25.2	Q, CR
2	3	Beatriz Kretschmer	Chile	26.2	Q
3	3	Elsa Campos	Peru	27.4	

Final – 19 April

Rank	Name	Nationality	Time	Notes
1st place, gold medalist(s)	Beatriz Kretschmer	Chile	25.5	
2nd place, silver medalist(s)	Gladys Erbetta	Argentina	25.8	
3rd place, bronze medalist(s)	Martha Huby	Peru	26.1	
4	Teresa Venegas	Chile	26.5	
5	Olga Bianchi	Argentina	26.6	
6	Hannelore Poetscher	Brazil	26.7	

=== 80 metres hurdles ===
Heats – 21 April

Rank	Heat	Name	Nationality	Time	Notes
1	1	Wanda dos Santos	Brazil	11.5	Q
2	1	Ada Brener	Argentina	11.8	Q
3	1	Marlene Hyslop	Chile	12.5	Q
4	1	Ana Cárdenas	Colombia	12.6	
5	1	Dora Sánchez	Peru	15.9	
1	2	Eliana Gaete	Chile	11.8	Q
2	2	Beatriz Kretschmer	Chile	11.9	Q
3	2	Maria José de Lima	Brazil	12.2	Q
4	2	Teresa Carvajal	Argentina	13.2	
5	2	Olga Catter	Peru	13.5	

Final – 22 April

Rank	Name	Nationality	Time	Notes
1st place, gold medalist(s)	Wanda dos Santos	Brazil	11.5	
2nd place, silver medalist(s)	Eliana Gaete	Chile	11.6	
3rd place, bronze medalist(s)	Ada Brener	Argentina	11.9	
4	Maria José de Lima	Brazil	12.0	
5	Marlene Hyslop	Chile	12.2	
	Beatriz Kretschmer	Chile	DNS	

=== 4 × 100 metres relay ===
22 April

Rank	Nation	Competitors	Time	Notes
1st place, gold medalist(s)	Argentina	Gladys Erbetta, Lilián Buglia, Edith Berg, Olga Bianchi	48.6	
2nd place, silver medalist(s)	Chile	Marlene Hyslop, Eliana Gaete, Teresa Venegas, Patricia Rodoni	49.3	
3rd place, bronze medalist(s)	Brazil	Wanda dos Santos, Maria José de Lima, Marlene Matos, Hannelore Poetscher	49.4	
4	Peru	Elsa Campos, Gaby Donaire, Dora Sánchez, Martha Huby	51.0	

=== High jump ===
21 April

Rank	Name	Nationality	Result	Notes
1st place, gold medalist(s)	Nelly Gómez	Chile	1.50	
2nd place, silver medalist(s)	Elizabeth Müller	Brazil	1.50	
3rd place, bronze medalist(s)	María Cañas	Chile	1.50	
3rd place, bronze medalist(s)	Cleide Eloy	Brazil	1.50	
5	Ida Visentainer	Chile	1.45	
5	Gladys Erbetta	Argentina	1.45	

=== Long jump ===
15 April

Rank	Name	Nationality	Result	Notes
1st place, gold medalist(s)	Gladys Erbetta	Argentina	5.88	AR
2nd place, silver medalist(s)	Ada Brener	Argentina	5.41	
3rd place, bronze medalist(s)	Olga Bianchi	Argentina	5.39	
4	Marlene Hyslop	Chile	5.32	
5	Wanda dos Santos	Brazil	5.25	
6	Ida Visentainer	Chile	5.04	

=== Shot put ===
19 April

Rank	Name	Nationality	Result	Notes
1st place, gold medalist(s)	Eliana Bahamondes	Chile	11.95	CR
2nd place, silver medalist(s)	Pradelia Delgado	Chile	11.84	
3rd place, bronze medalist(s)	Elizabeth Müller	Brazil	11.31	
4	Isabel Avellán	Argentina	11.20	
5	Julia Huapaya	Peru	11.06	
6	Nelly Yugo	Chile	10.57	
7	Ingeborg Mello	Argentina	10.45	
8	Lilian Poetzcher	Brazil	10.00	
9	Zulema Bonaparte	Argentina	9.18	

=== Discus throw ===
14 April

Rank	Name	Nationality	Result	Notes
1st place, gold medalist(s)	Isabel Avellán	Argentina	44.08	CR
2nd place, silver medalist(s)	Rosa Riveros	Chile	38.22	
3rd place, bronze medalist(s)	Ingeborg Mello	Argentina	38.08	
4	Daisy Hoffmann	Chile	37.63	
5	Zulema Bonaparte	Argentina	37.02	
6	Pradelia Delgado	Chile	36.97	
7	Lilian Poetzcher	Brazil	34.81	
8	Julia Huarpaya	Peru	34.31	

=== Javelin throw ===
22 April – old model

Rank	Name	Nationality	Result	Notes
1st place, gold medalist(s)	Marlene Ahrens	Chile	48.73	AR
2nd place, silver medalist(s)	Carmen Venegas	Chile	40.70	
3rd place, bronze medalist(s)	Adriana Silva	Chile	38.91	
4	Magdalena García	Argentina	37.47	
5	Dolly Molina	Colombia	35.86	
