= Waldo Sandoval =

Chilean middle-distance runner

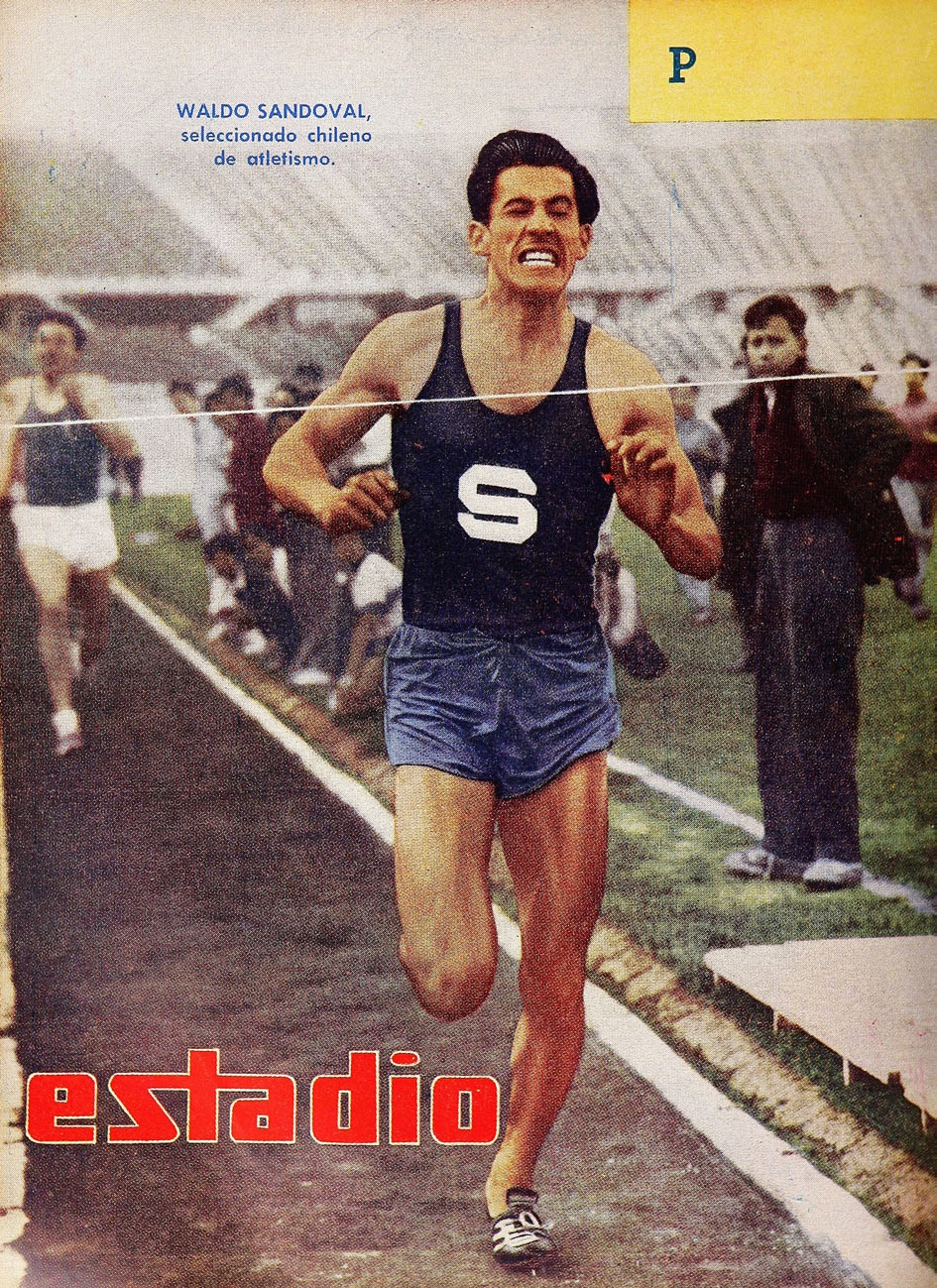

Personal details
- Born: November 1933 (age 92) Santiago, Chile

Waldo Sandoval is a middle-distance runner from Santiago, Chile. He placed third in the 1956 South American Championships in Athletics for the 1500 metres run. Waldo is the younger brother of runner Ramon Sandoval. He currently resides in Miami, FL.

== International competitions ==
Year	Competition	Venue	Position	Event	Notes
Representing Chile
1954	South American Championships	São Paulo, Brazil	4th	800 m	1:55.4
1954	South American Championships	São Paulo, Brazil	2nd	4 × 400 m relay	3:16.9
1955	Pan American Games	Mexico City, Mexico	4th (h)	800 m	NT
1956	South American Championships	Santiago, Chile	4th	800 m	1:52.4
1956	South American Championships	Santiago, Chile	3rd	1500 m	3:54.5
1956	South American Championships	Santiago, Chile	4th	4 × 400 m relay	3:17.3
1957	South American Championships (unofficial)	Montevideo, Uruguay	3rd	800 m	1:53.7
1957	South American Championships (unofficial)	Montevideo, Uruguay	2nd	4 × 400 m relay	3:18.9
