= Guillermo Zapata =

Colombian sprinter (born 1928)

Personal information
- Nationality: Colombian
- Born: 1928
- Height: 1.87 m (6 ft 2 in)
- Weight: 73 kg (161 lb)

Sport
- Sport: Sprinting
- Event: 110 metres hurdles

Guillermo Zapata (born 1928) is a Colombian hurdler. He competed in the men's 4 × 400 metres relay at the 1956 Summer Olympics.

== International competitions ==
Year	Competition	Venue	Position	Event	Notes
Representing Colombia
1955	Pan American Games	Mexico City, Mexico	7th (h)	110 m hurdles	15.65
1956	South American Championships	Santiago, Chile	5th	110 m hurdles	15.5
1956	South American Championships	Santiago, Chile	6th	400 m hurdles	58.3
1956	Olympic Games	Melbourne, Australia	23rd (h)	110 m hurdles	15.58
1956	Olympic Games	Melbourne, Australia	14th (h)	4 × 400 m relay	3:27.4
1960	Ibero-American Games	Santiago, Chile	9th (sf)	110 m hurdles	15.8
1962	Central American and Caribbean Games	Kingston, Jamaica	14th (h)	110 m hurdles	16.0

== Personal bests ==
- 110 metres hurdles – 14.6h (1956)
