= 1958 South American Championships in Athletics – Results =

These are the results of the 1958 South American Championships in Athletics which took place at the Pista del Parque Batlle y Ordoñez in Montevideo, Uruguay, between 19 and 27 April. Only the top 6 athletes have been reported for most finals.

== Men's results ==
=== 100 metres ===
Heats – 19 April
Wind:
Heat 1: +1.5 m/s, Heat 2: +0.5 m/s, Heat 3: +1.0 m/s

Rank	Heat	Name	Nationality	Time	Notes
1	1	Luis Vienna	Argentina	10.6	Q
2	1	João Pires Sobrinho	Brazil	10.9	Q
3	1	Hugo de la Fuente	Chile	10.9	Q
4	1	Arturo Flores	Ecuador	11.0	Q
5	1	Néstor Ibarra	Uruguay	11.1	
6	1	José Zelaya	Paraguay	11.1	
1	2	José Telles da Conceição	Brazil	10.7	Q
2	2	Carlos Falco	Uruguay	10.9	Q
3	2	Roberto Ferrario	Argentina	10.9	Q
4	2	Guillermo Sebastiani	Peru	11.0	Q
5	2	Teodoro Blaschke	Chile	11.1	
6	2	Mario Drouet	Ecuador	11.1	
1	3	Eduardo Krumm	Chile	10.6	Q
2	3	Jorge de Barros	Brazil	10.9	Q
3	3	Pedro Marcel	Argentina	10.9	Q
4	3	Guillermo Martínez	Ecuador	11.1	Q
5	3	Juan Clavijo	Uruguay	11.1	
6	3	José Vega	Peru	11.2	

Semifinals – 19 April

Rank	Heat	Name	Nationality	Time	Notes
1	1	José Telles da Conceição	Brazil	10.7	Q
2	1	Luis Vienna	Argentina	10.7	Q
3	1	Carlos Falco	Uruguay	10.9	Q
4	1	Hugo de la Fuente	Chile	11.1	
5	1	Pedro Marcel	Argentina	11.1	
6	1	Guillermo Martínez	Ecuador	11.2	
1	2	Jorge de Barros	Brazil	10.6	Q
2	2	João Pires Sobrinho	Brazil	10.6	Q
3	2	Eduardo Krumm	Chile	10.6	Q
4	2	Guillermo Sebastiani	Peru	10.9	
5	2	Roberto Ferrario	Argentina	11.0	
6	2	Arturo Flores	Ecuador	11.1	

Final – 20 April
Wind: -2.0 m/s

Rank	Name	Nationality	Time	Notes
1st place, gold medalist(s)	José Telles da Conceição	Brazil	10.5	=CR
2nd place, silver medalist(s)	Luis Vienna	Argentina	10.6	
3rd place, bronze medalist(s)	João Pires Sobrinho	Brazil	10.8	
4	Jorge de Barros	Brazil	10.8	
5	Eduardo Krumm	Chile	10.9	
6	Carlos Falco	Uruguay	11.0	

=== 200 metres ===
Heats – 22 April
Wind:
Heat 1: -2.0 m/s, Heat 2: -1.5 m/s, Heat 3: ?, Heat 4: ?

Rank	Heat	Name	Nationality	Time	Notes
1	1	Jorge de Barros	Brazil	22.3	Q
2	1	Luis Vienna	Argentina	22.4	Q
3	1	Teodoro Blaschke	Chile	22.6	Q
4	1	Arturo Flores	Ecuador	22.7	
5	1	Adamis Rivas	Uruguay	22.8	
1	2	João Pires Sobrinho	Brazil	23.1	Q
2	2	Roberto Ferrario	Argentina	23.1	Q
3	2	Mario Drouet	Ecuador	23.3	Q
4	2	José Vega	Peru	23.6	
5	2	Elbio Rama	Uruguay	23.6	
1	3	Guillermo Sebastiani	Peru	23.0	Q
2	3	Mario Chiriboga	Ecuador	23.1	Q
3	3	Juan Ferro	Argentina	23.4	Q
4	3	Apolinar Flores	Paraguay	23.8	
1	4	José Telles da Conceição	Brazil	22.0	Q
2	4	Carlos Falco	Uruguay	22.6	Q
3	4	Hugo de la Fuente	Chile	22.6	Q
4	4	José Zelaya	Paraguay	22.8	

Semifinals – 22 April

Rank	Heat	Name	Nationality	Time	Notes
1	1	José Telles da Conceição	Brazil	21.3	Q
2	1	Jorge de Barros	Brazil	21.6	Q
3	1	Guillermo Sebastiani	Peru	22.1	Q
4	1	Roberto Ferrario	Argentina	22.4	
5	1	Mario Drouet	Ecuador	22.6	
6	1	Teodoro Blaschke	Chile	23.0	
1	2	João Pires Sobrinho	Brazil	22.0	Q
2	2	Hugo de la Fuente	Chile	22.3	Q
3	2	Carlos Falco	Uruguay	22.6	Q
4	2	Mario Chiriboga	Ecuador	23.4	
	2	Luis Vienna	Argentina	DQ	
	2	Juan Ferro	Argentina	DQ	

Final – 24 April

Rank	Name	Nationality	Time	Notes
1st place, gold medalist(s)	José Telles da Conceição	Brazil	21.6	
2nd place, silver medalist(s)	Jorge de Barros	Brazil	22.3	
3rd place, bronze medalist(s)	Guillermo Sebastiani	Peru	22.4	
4	João Pires Sobrinho	Brazil	22.4	
5	Hugo de la Fuente	Chile	22.5	
6	Carlos Falco	Uruguay	22.7	

=== 400 metres ===
Heats – 19 April

Rank	Heat	Name	Nationality	Time	Notes
1	1	Jaime Aparicio	Colombia	50.9	Q
2	1	Heber Etcheverry	Uruguay	51.4	Q
3	1	José Laca	Peru	51.4	Q
4	1	Gert Wagner	Chile	51.6	
1	2	Argemiro Roque	Brazil	50.6	Q
2	2	Ramón Sánchez	Peru	51.2	Q
3	2	Jorge Bolados	Chile	51.3	Q
4	2	Elbio Rama	Uruguay	52.3	
5	2	Apolinar Flores	Paraguay	56.0	
1	3	Ulisses dos Santos	Brazil	50.3	Q
2	3	Víctor Lozano	Argentina	50.7	Q
3	3	Eulogio Gomes	Peru	50.8	Q
4	3	José Carrera	Ecuador	51.5	
5	3	Basílico Galeano	Paraguay	53.0	
1	4	Julio León	Chile	50.2	Q
2	4	Geraldo Costa	Brazil	50.6	Q
3	4	Roberto Battistello	Argentina	50.8	Q
4	4	Carlos Pereyra	Uruguay	51.0	

Semifinals – 19 April

Rank	Heat	Name	Nationality	Time	Notes
1	1	Julio León	Chile	49.3	Q
2	1	Geraldo Costa	Brazil	50.0	Q
3	1	Ramón Sánchez	Peru	50.0	Q
4	1	Heber Etcheverry	Uruguay	50.3	
5	1	José Laca	Peru	51.7	
6	1	Roberto Battistello	Argentina	51.9	
1	2	Argemiro Roque	Brazil	49.2	Q
2	2	Ulisses dos Santos	Brazil	49.9	Q
3	2	Jaime Aparicio	Colombia	49.9	Q
4	2	Eulogio Gomes	Peru	50.0	
5	2	Víctor Lozano	Argentina	50.5	
6	2	Jorge Bolados	Chile	51.5	

Final – 20 April

Rank	Name	Nationality	Time	Notes
1st place, gold medalist(s)	Argemiro Roque	Brazil	48.6	
2nd place, silver medalist(s)	Ulisses dos Santos	Brazil	49.1	
3rd place, bronze medalist(s)	Geraldo Costa	Brazil	49.5	
4	Jaime Aparicio	Colombia	49.5	
5	Julio León	Chile	49.7	
6	Ramón Sánchez	Peru	50.7	

=== 800 metres ===
Heats – 22 April

Rank	Heat	Name	Nationality	Time	Notes
1	1	Eduardo Balducci	Argentina	1:55.7	Q
2	1	Eduardo Fontecilla	Chile	1:56.6	Q
3	1	Albertico Correa	Uruguay	1:57.0	Q
4	1	Armando da Silva	Brazil	1:57.8	Q
5	1	Ricardo Gutiérrez	Argentina	1:58.3	
6	1	Carlos Pereyra	Uruguay	2:00.7	
7	1	Basílico Galeano	Paraguay	2:02.4	
1	2	Argemiro Roque	Brazil	1:59.5	Q
2	2	Ramón Sandoval	Chile	1:59.6	Q
3	2	Luis Saavedra	Chile	1:59.7	Q
4	2	Waldemir dos Santos	Brazil	1:59.8	Q
5	2	Gilberto Miori	Argentina	2:00.0	
6	2	Juan López	Peru	2:00.5	
7	2	Juan Araújo	Ecuador	2:01.3	

Final – 24 April

Rank	Name	Nationality	Time	Notes
1st place, gold medalist(s)	Ramón Sandoval	Chile	1:49.6	
2nd place, silver medalist(s)	Eduardo Balducci	Argentina	1:51.3	
3rd place, bronze medalist(s)	Argemiro Roque	Brazil	1:52.6	
4	Waldemir dos Santos	Brazil	1:53.8	
5	Armando da Silva	Brazil	1:54.3	
6	Eduardo Fontecilla	Chile	1:54.6	
7	Albertico Correa	Uruguay	1:55.4	
	Luis Saavedra	Chile	NT	

=== 1500 metres ===
20 April

Rank	Name	Nationality	Time	Notes
1st place, gold medalist(s)	Ramón Sandoval	Chile	3:47.5	AR
2nd place, silver medalist(s)	Gilberto Miori	Argentina	3:51.3	PB
3rd place, bronze medalist(s)	Eduardo Balducci	Argentina	3:51.3	
4	Ricardo Vidal	Chile	3:53.5	
5	Eduardo Fontecilla	Chile	3:54.3	
6	Sebastião Mendes	Brazil	3:55.7	

=== 5000 metres ===
19 April

Rank	Name	Nationality	Time	Notes
1st place, gold medalist(s)	Osvaldo Suárez	Argentina	14:26.1	CR
2nd place, silver medalist(s)	Walter Lemos	Argentina	14:40.6	
3rd place, bronze medalist(s)	Luis Sandobal	Argentina	14:49.2	
4	Jaime Correa	Chile	15:02.0	
5	Jorge González	Chile	15:02.7	
6	Santiago Novas	Chile	15:03.1	

=== 10,000 metres ===
24 April

Rank	Name	Nationality	Time	Notes
1st place, gold medalist(s)	Osvaldo Suárez	Argentina	30:37.2	
2nd place, silver medalist(s)	Walter Lemos	Argentina	30:37.4	
3rd place, bronze medalist(s)	Armando Pino	Argentina	31:23.0	
4	Jorge González	Chile	31:29.8	
5	Jaime Correa	Chile	31:30.8	
6	José Calixto	Brazil	31:32.2	
7	Alfredo de Oliveira	Brazil	NT	
8	Geraldo Alves	Brazil	NT	
9	Matías Delgado Vallejos	Paraguay	33:12.0	
	Luis Campusano	Chile	DNF	

=== Half marathon ===
27 April

Rank	Name	Nationality	Time	Notes
1st place, gold medalist(s)	Osvaldo Suárez	Argentina	1:12:38	
2nd place, silver medalist(s)	Armando Pino	Argentina	1:13.29	
3rd place, bronze medalist(s)	Juan Silva	Chile	1:13:45	
4	Alfredo de Oliveira	Brazil	1:15:33	
5	João dos Santos Filho	Brazil	1:17:59	
6	Matías Delgado Vallejos	Paraguay	1:18:45	
7	Luis Campusano	Chile	NT	
8	João Lucas Evangelista	Brazil	NT	
9	Alfonso Cornejo	Chile	NT	
10	Ariel González	Uruguay	NT	
	Walter Lemos	Argentina	DNF	

=== 110 metres hurdles ===
Heats – 20 April
Wind:
Heat 1: +2.0 m/s, Heat 2: +2.0 m/s

Rank	Heat	Name	Nationality	Time	Notes
1	1	Wilson Carneiro	Brazil	14.9	Q
2	1	Yelton Bagnasco	Uruguay	15.0	Q
3	1	Carlos Cozzi	Argentina	15.4	Q
4	1	Carlos Witting	Chile	15.5	
5	1	Arturo Isasmendi	Uruguay	15.5	
6	1	Ariel Standen	Chile	15.9	
1	2	Ijoel da Silva	Brazil	15.0	Q
2	2	Estanislao Kocourek	Argentina	15.1	Q
3	2	Francisco Bergonzoni	Brazil	15.1	Q
4	2	Miguel González	Argentina	15.2	
5	2	Héctor Henríquez	Chile	16.0	
6	2	Alfredo Estavillo	Uruguay	16.5	

Final – 22 April

Rank	Name	Nationality	Time	Notes
1st place, gold medalist(s)	Wilson Carneiro	Brazil	14.9	
2nd place, silver medalist(s)	Francisco Bergonzoni	Brazil	15.1	
3rd place, bronze medalist(s)	Ijoel da Silva	Brazil	15.1	
4	Estanislao Kocourek	Argentina	15.1	
5	Yelton Bagnasco	Uruguay	15.2	
6	Carlos Cozzi	Argentina	15.6	

=== 400 metres hurdles ===
Heats – 24 April

Rank	Heat	Name	Nationality	Time	Notes
1	1	Ulisses dos Santos	Brazil	54.8	Q
2	1	Jorge Bolados	Chile	55.2	Q
3	1	Emir Miller	Uruguay	57.3	
4	1	Marcial Pereira	Paraguay	58.5	
1	2	Jaime Aparicio	Colombia	55.3	Q
2	2	Erwino Stobaus	Brazil	55.5	Q
	2	Jorge van Megroot	Argentina	DQ	
	2	Hugo Dávalos	Paraguay	DQ	
1	3	Sergio de Macedo	Brazil	54.6	Q
2	3	Heber Etcheverry	Uruguay	54.8	Q
3	3	Isidro Ibarrondo	Argentina	55.8	
4	3	Pablo Eitel	Chile	56.0	

Final – 26 April

Rank	Name	Nationality	Time	Notes
1st place, gold medalist(s)	Ulisses dos Santos	Brazil	52.5	
2nd place, silver medalist(s)	Jaime Aparicio	Colombia	52.6	
3rd place, bronze medalist(s)	Erwino Stobaus	Brazil	54.2	
4	Heber Etcheverry	Uruguay	54.8	
5	Sergio de Macedo	Brazil	54.8	
6	Jorge Bolados	Chile	55.3	

=== 3000 metres steeplechase ===
26 April

Rank	Name	Nationality	Time	Notes
1st place, gold medalist(s)	Sebastião Mendes	Brazil	9:20.0	
2nd place, silver medalist(s)	Santiago Novas	Chile	9:20.4	
3rd place, bronze medalist(s)	Alberto Ríos	Argentina	9:29.8	
4	Francisco Allen	Chile	9:35.2	
5	Gilberto Mori	Argentina	9:44.6	
6	Edgard Freire	Brazil	9:48.6	
8	Hernando Ruiz	Colombia	NT	

=== 4 × 100 metres relay ===
Heats – 24 April

Rank	Lane	Nation	Competitors	Time	Notes
1	1	Argentina		42.1	Q
2	1	Brazil		43.2	Q
3	1	Chile		43.4	Q
1	2	Uruguay		42.8	Q
2	2	Peru		42.8	Q
3	2	Ecuador		43.0	Q
4	2	Paraguay		44.9	

Final – 26 April

Rank	Nation	Competitors	Time	Notes
1st place, gold medalist(s)	Brazil	Affonso da Silva, Jorge de Barros, João Pires Sobrinho, José Telles da Conceição	41.3	
2nd place, silver medalist(s)	Argentina	Pedro Marcel, Juan Carlos Salom, Vicente Giorgio, Luis Vienna	41.8	
3rd place, bronze medalist(s)	Chile	Eduardo Bezanilla, Teodoro Blaschke, Hugo de la Fuente, Gert Wagner	42.2	
4	Peru	Guillermo Sebastiani, José Vega, Ramón Sánchez, Eulogio Gomes	42.5	
5	Uruguay	Fermín Donazar, Juan Clavijo, Noel Revello, Carlos Falco	42.9	
6	Ecuador	Mario Drouet, Mario Chiriboga, Guillermo Martínez, Arturo Flores	43.2	

=== 4 × 400 metres relay ===
Heats – 26 April

Rank	Lane	Nation	Competitors	Time	Notes
1	1	Brazil	Mário do Nascimento, Argemiro Roque, Ulisses dos Santos, Geraldo Costa	3:23.6	Q
2	1	Argentina	Roberto Batistelo, Víctor Lozano, Eduardo Balducci, Francisco Paganesi	3:23.6	Q
3	1	Chile	Gert Wagner, Pablo Eitel, Jorge Bolados, Julio León	3:30.7	Q
1	2	Peru	Ramón Sánchez, José Laca, Guillermo Sebastiani, Eulogio Gomes	3:23.6	Q
2	2	Uruguay	Heber Etcheverry, Albertico Correa, Emir Miller, Carlos Pereira	3:24.1	Q
3	2	Ecuador	Mario Drouet, Juan Araújo, José Carrera, Arturo Flores	3:25.5	Q
4	2	Paraguay		3:32.8	

Final – 27 April

Rank	Nation	Competitors	Time	Notes
1st place, gold medalist(s)	Brazil	Ulisses dos Santos, Mário do Nascimento, Geraldo Costa, Argemiro Roque	3:16.3	
2nd place, silver medalist(s)	Peru	Ramón Sánchez, José Laca, Guillermo Sebastiani, Eulogio Gomes	3:17.4	
3rd place, bronze medalist(s)	Argentina	Roberto Batistelo, Víctor Lozano, Eduardo Balducci, Francisco Paganesi	3:18.5	
4	Chile	Gert Wagner, Pablo Eitel, Jorge Bolados, Julio León	3:21.6	
5	Uruguay	Heber Etcheverry, Albertico Correa, Emir Miller, Carlos Pereira	3:22.8	
6	Ecuador	Mario Drouet, Juan Araújo, José Carrera, Arturo Flores	3:24.3	

=== High jump ===
19 April

Rank	Name	Nationality	Result	Notes
1st place, gold medalist(s)	José Telles da Conceição	Brazil	1.90	
2nd place, silver medalist(s)	Alfredo Lopes	Brazil	1.90	
3rd place, bronze medalist(s)	Oscar Bártoli	Argentina	1.80	
3rd place, bronze medalist(s)	Horacio Martínez	Argentina	1.80	
3rd place, bronze medalist(s)	Reinaldo de Oliveira	Brazil	1.80	
3rd place, bronze medalist(s)	Ernesto Lagos	Chile	1.80	
3rd place, bronze medalist(s)	Juan Ruiz	Chile	1.80	
8	Aldo Zuccolillo	Paraguay	1.80	
8	Luis Huarcaya	Peru	1.80	

=== Pole vault ===
22 April

Rank	Name	Nationality	Result	Notes
1st place, gold medalist(s)	José Luis Infante	Chile	4.00	=CR
2nd place, silver medalist(s)	Fausto de Souza	Brazil	3.90	
3rd place, bronze medalist(s)	Carlos Kreuz	Argentina	3.80	
4	Ricardo Bonini	Argentina	3.70	
5	Artemio Fava	Argentina	3.70	
6	Carlos Olalde	Uruguay	3.70	

=== Long jump ===
20 April

Rank	Name	Nationality	Result	Notes
1st place, gold medalist(s)	Fermín Donazar	Uruguay	7.24	
2nd place, silver medalist(s)	Ary de Sá	Brazil	7.18	
3rd place, bronze medalist(s)	Eduardo Krumm	Chile	7.11	
4	Luís Akuta	Brazil	7.04	
5	Aldo Zucolillo	Paraguay	7.02	
6	Pedro Marcel	Argentina	6.78	

=== Triple jump ===
24 April

Rank	Name	Nationality	Result	Notes
1st place, gold medalist(s)	Adhemar da Silva	Brazil	15.70	
2nd place, silver medalist(s)	Reinaldo de Oliveira	Brazil	14.78	
3rd place, bronze medalist(s)	Itiro Nakaie	Brazil	14.60	
4	Ariel Standen	Chile	14.51	
5	Jorge Castillo	Argentina	14.22	
6	Eugenio Muñoz	Chile	14.21	
7	Fernández	Uruguay	?	
8	Raúl Castagnino	Argentina	?	

=== Shot put ===
20 April

Rank	Name	Nationality	Result	Notes
1st place, gold medalist(s)	Enrique Helf	Argentina	15.41	CR
2nd place, silver medalist(s)	Isolino Taborda	Brazil	15.00	
3rd place, bronze medalist(s)	Rubén Scaraffia	Argentina	14.67	
4	Alcides Dambrós	Brazil	14.60	
5	Günther Kruse	Argentina	14.45	
6	Nadim Marreis	Brazil	14.14	
	Leonardo Kittsteiner	Chile	13.71	

=== Discus throw ===
26 April

Rank	Name	Nationality	Result	Notes
1st place, gold medalist(s)	Hernán Haddad	Chile	49.10	CR
2nd place, silver medalist(s)	Günther Kruse	Argentina	47.43	
3rd place, bronze medalist(s)	Pedro Ucke	Argentina	46.49	
4	Enrique Helf	Argentina	44.46	
5	Milton dos Santos	Brazil	44.32	
6	Héctor Menacho	Peru	44.19	
7	Eduardo Julve	Peru	44.10	
8	Dieter Gevert	Chile	43.37	
9	João Alexandre	Brazil	41.97	
10	Juris Laipenieks	Chile	36.31	

=== Hammer throw ===
22 April

Rank	Name	Nationality	Result	Notes
1st place, gold medalist(s)	Alejandro Díaz	Chile	54.45	CR
2nd place, silver medalist(s)	Walter Kupper	Brazil	51.77	
3rd place, bronze medalist(s)	Walter Rodrigues	Brazil	51.69	
4	Bruno Strohmeier	Brazil	50.82	
5	Arturo Melcher	Chile	50.19	
6	Edmundo Zuñiga	Chile	45.98	

=== Javelin throw ===
19 April – old model

Rank	Name	Nationality	Result	Notes
1st place, gold medalist(s)	Ricardo Heber	Argentina	65.78	
2nd place, silver medalist(s)	Walter de Almeida	Brazil	65.14	
3rd place, bronze medalist(s)	Janis Stendzeniecks	Chile	60.14	
4	Néstor Matteucci	Argentina	58.85	
5	Luis Zárate	Peru	58.33	
6	Luiz Correa	Brazil	57.28	
	Juris Laipenieks	Chile	52.??	
	Rafael Bascoli	Chile	44.??	

=== Decathlon ===
26–27 April – 1952 tables (1985 conversions given with *)

The highest mark recorded in each event is highlighted in yellow

Rank	Athlete	Nationality	100m	LJ	SP	HJ	400m	110m H	DT	PV	JT	1500m	Points	Conv.	Notes
1st place, gold medalist(s)	Leonardo Kittsteiner	Chile	11.4	6.20	14.16	1.63	52.5	16.1	36.71	3.10	52.28	5:05.5	5645	6100*	
2nd place, silver medalist(s)	Yelton Bagnasco	Uruguay	11.0	6.44	11.21	1.69	52.0	15.1	30.89	3.00	44.01	4:53.9	5634	6049*	
3rd place, bronze medalist(s)	Mario Cachile	Argentina	11.0	6.05	12.68	1.60	52.5	16.3	35.57	3.40	46.46	5:00.8	5547	6005*	
4	Hernán Figueroa	Chile	11.4	6.49	12.60	1.72	53.8	17.2	38.10	3.30	51.39	5:08.9	5530	6018*	
5	Emir Martínez	Argentina	11.5	6.41	12.31	1.75	52.0	16.3	35.60	3.20	41.41	4:40.1	5524	6104*	
6	Héctor Menacho	Peru	11.4	6.03	12.35	1.60	51.5	16.2	41.22	3.20	40.50	4:49.2	5515	5941*	
7	Rúbens Habesh	Brazil	11.3	6.33	10.77	1.78	51.7	16.0	31.82	3.40	38.99	4:59.7	5434	5922*	
8	Aldo Ribeiro	Brazil	11.4	6.53	10.63	1.72	53.7	16.2	31.98	3.10	49.91	4:59.2	5298	5877*	
9	Luís Fernandes	Brazil	11.7	6.44	10.03	1.60	51.7	16.3	32.15	3.20	41.66	4:33.2	5173	5767*	
10	Wladimiro Leighton	Chile	11.1	6.76	10.82	1.60	52.7	18.4	33.72	2.90	39.02	4:46.3	4992	5634*	
11	Oscar Bártoli	Argentina	11.9	6.32	12.01	1.85	53.9	17.6	36.51	3.10	44.52	4:58.1	4867	5790*	
12	R. López	Uruguay	11.5	6.12	11.21	1.60	53.3	17.8	29.11	3.10	43.95	4:50.1	4767	5428*	
13	Carlos Monge	Peru	11.1	6.43	10.42	1.60	55.8	17.3	29.73	2.00	55.67	DNF	4612	–	
14	E. Villalba	Paraguay	11.7	6.01	9.05	1.66	56.1	18.3	26.58	2.80	29.64	DNF	3652	–	

== Women's results ==
=== 100 metres ===
Heats – 19 April

Rank	Heat	Name	Nationality	Time	Notes
1	1	Teresa Venegas	Chile	12.6	Q
2	1	Edelma Gutiérrez	Uruguay	12.8	Q
3	1	Wanda dos Santos	Brazil	12.9	Q
4	1	Hilda Vetorazzo	Argentina	13.0	Q
5	1	Agustina Galeano	Paraguay	13.5	
1	2	Marlene Porto	Brazil	12.3	Q
2	2	Martha Huby	Peru	12.5	Q
3	2	Dolores Bonnacassi	Argentina	12.9	Q
4	2	Kate Harzenetter	Chile	12.9	Q
5	2	María Gonzaga	Uruguay	13.1	
6	2	Stella Gómez	Paraguay	13.8	
1	3	Nancy Correa	Chile	12.5	Q
2	3	Érica da Silva	Brazil	12.7	Q
3	3	Elsa Miranda	Peru	12.9	Q
4	3	Miriam Cabanillas	Argentina	13.1	Q
5	3	Gricelda Couto	Uruguay	13.3	
6	3	Venus Ozuna	Paraguay	14.6	

Semifinals – 19 April

Rank	Heat	Name	Nationality	Time	Notes
1	1	Nancy Correa	Chile	12.5	Q
2	1	Marlene Porto	Brazil	12.7	Q
3	1	Wanda dos Santos	Brazil	12.7	Q
4	1	Elsa Miranda	Peru	13.1	
5	1	Kate Harzenetter	Chile	13.1	
6	1	Miriam Cabanillas	Argentina	13.2	
1	1	Martha Huby	Peru	12.4	Q
2	1	Teresa Venegas	Chile	12.8	Q
3	1	Érica da Silva	Brazil	12.8	Q
4	1	Dolores Bonnacassi	Argentina	13.0	
5	1	Edelma Gutiérrez	Uruguay	13.0	
6	1	Hilda Vetorazzo	Argentina	13.5	

Final – 20 April

Rank	Lane	Name	Nationality	Time	Notes
1st place, gold medalist(s)	2	Martha Huby	Peru	12.4	
2nd place, silver medalist(s)	3	Marlene Porto	Brazil	12.5	
3rd place, bronze medalist(s)	6	Nancy Correa	Chile	12.5	
4	5	Teresa Venegas	Chile	12.7	
5	4	Érica da Silva	Brazil	12.8	
6	1	Wanda dos Santos	Brazil	12.9	

=== 200 metres ===
Heats – 22 April

Rank	Heat	Name	Nationality	Time	Notes
1	1	Érica da Silva	Brazil	26.2	Q
2	1	Nancy Correa	Chile	27.5	Q
3	1	Elsa Miranda	Peru	27.6	
4	1	Gricelda Couto	Uruguay	28.2	
5	1	Agustina Galeano	Paraguay	29.0	
1	2	Teresa Venegas	Chile	26.2	Q
2	2	Edelma Gutiérrez	Uruguay	26.7	Q
3	2	Maria José de Lima	Brazil	27.0	
4	2	Hilda Vetorazzo	Argentina	27.6	
5	2	Stella Gómez	Paraguay	30.0	
1	3	Melânia Luz	Brazil	26.9	Q
2	3	Martha Huby	Peru	26.9	Q
3	3	Miriam Cabanillas	Argentina	27.1	

Final – 24 April

Rank	Name	Nationality	Time	Notes
1st place, gold medalist(s)	Martha Huby	Peru	25.5	=CR
2nd place, silver medalist(s)	Érica da Silva	Brazil	25.6	
3rd place, bronze medalist(s)	Teresa Venegas	Chile	25.8	
4	Melânia Luz	Brazil	26.2	
5	Edelma Gutiérrez	Uruguay	26.4	
6	Nancy Correa	Chile	26.4	

=== 80 metres hurdles ===
Heats – 26 April

Rank	Heat	Name	Nationality	Time	Notes
1	1	Wanda dos Santos	Brazil	11.8	Q
2	1	Lucía Fantino	Argentina	12.5	Q
3	1	Iris dos Santos	Brazil	12.6	Q
4	1	Martha Gatica	Chile	13.1	
5	1	Stella Gómez	Paraguay	16.1	
1	2	Maria José de Lima	Brazil	12.2	Q
2	2	Alicia García	Argentina	12.5	Q
3	2	Elida Cairus	Uruguay	13.0	Q
4	2	Katte Harzenetter	Chile	13.1	

Final – 27 April

Rank	Name	Nationality	Time	Notes
1st place, gold medalist(s)	Wanda dos Santos	Brazil	11.5	
2nd place, silver medalist(s)	Maria José de Lima	Brazil	12.1	
3rd place, bronze medalist(s)	Lucía Fantino	Argentina	12.2	
4	Iris dos Santos	Brazil	12.3	
5	Alicia García	Argentina	12.4	
6	Elida Cairus	Uruguay	12.7	

=== 4 × 100 metres relay ===
27 April

Rank	Nation	Competitors	Time	Notes
1st place, gold medalist(s)	Brazil	Wanda dos Santos, Érica da Silva, Melânia Luz, Marlene Porto	48.7	
2nd place, silver medalist(s)	Chile	Katte Harzenetter, Nancy Correa, Teresa Venegas, Marta Gatica	50.2	
3rd place, bronze medalist(s)	Argentina	Dolores Bonacassi, Miriam Cabanillas, Luci´a Fantino, Marta González	50.6	
4	Uruguay	Elida Cairus, Griselda Couto, Edelma Gutiérrez, María Gonzaga	51.3	
5	Paraguay	Gormán, Taboada, Venus Ozuna, Agustina Galeano	55.7	

=== High jump ===
25 April

Rank	Name	Nationality	Result	Notes
1st place, gold medalist(s)	Renate Friedrichs	Chile	1.55	
2nd place, silver medalist(s)	Deyse de Castro	Brazil	1.50	
3rd place, bronze medalist(s)	Cleide Eloy	Brazil	1.50	
4	Esmeralda David	Argentina	1.45	
5	Maria José de Lima	Brazil	1.45	
6	Delia Díaz	Uruguay	1.40	
7	Juana Daumbach	Argentina	1.40	

=== Long jump ===
20 April

Rank	Name	Nationality	Result	Notes
1st place, gold medalist(s)	Iris dos Santos	Brazil	5.54	
2nd place, silver medalist(s)	Wanda dos Santos	Brazil	5.48	
3rd place, bronze medalist(s)	Marta González	Argentina	5.32	
4	Nancy Correa	Chile	5.27	
5	Elida Cairus	Uruguay	5.16	
6	Martha Gatica	Chile	5.06	

=== Shot put ===
24 April

Rank	Name	Nationality	Result	Notes
1st place, gold medalist(s)	Isabel Avellán	Argentina	12.69	CR, PB
2nd place, silver medalist(s)	Eliana Bahamondes	Chile	12.16	
3rd place, bronze medalist(s)	Vera Trezoitko	Brazil	12.06	
4	Pradelia Delgado	Chile	11.50	
5	Renate Friedrichs	Chile	11.46	
6	Mabel Dematei	Argentina	11.26	

=== Discus throw ===
19 April

Rank	Name	Nationality	Result	Notes
1st place, gold medalist(s)	Isabel Avellán	Argentina	44.57	CR
2nd place, silver medalist(s)	Pradelia Delgado	Chile	39.68	
3rd place, bronze medalist(s)	Ingeborg Mello	Argentina	39.05	
4	Eliana Bahamondes	Chile	36.98	
5	Hilda Lassen	Brazil	36.23	
6	Odete Domingos	Brazil	35.91	

=== Javelin throw ===
27 April – old model

Rank	Name	Nationality	Result	Notes
1st place, gold medalist(s)	Marlene Ahrens	Chile	43.85	
2nd place, silver medalist(s)	Adriana Silva	Chile	39.75	
3rd place, bronze medalist(s)	Magdalena García	Argentina	39.10	NR
4	Norma Santos	Argentina	37.92	
5	Anneliese Schmidt	Brazil	37.84	
6	Vera Trezoitko	Brazil	37.25	
