= Ulisses dos Santos =

Brazilian hurdler (1929–2021)

Personal information
- Born: 13 May 1929 Coruripe, Alagoas, Brazil
- Died: 17 March 2021 (aged 91) Macapá, Amapá, Brazil

Sport
- Sport: Track and field
- Events: 400 metres; 400 metres hurdles

Ulisses Laurindo dos Santos (13 May 1929 – 17 March 2021) was a Brazilian sprint and hurdling track and field athlete and journalist.

Dos Santos was born in Coruripe, Alagoas in 1929. In the early 1940s, his family moved to Rio de Janeiro, where he worked as a bakery delivery boy. He later worked as an administrative assistant, and at eighteen, joined the army, where he became a proficient short and middle-distance runner. He competed for the Vasco da Gama and Flamengo clubs.

Dos Santos competed in the men's 400 metres hurdles at the 1956 Summer Olympics. He also finished 5th in the 400 metres hurdles at the 1959 Pan American Games, and won several medals at the South American Championships in Athletics.

After retiring from athletics in 1965, dos Santos concentrated on his career as a sports journalist, writing a column about athletics in Correio da Manhã, and reporting on various sporting events. He died in 2021 as a result of complications after contracting COVID-19.

== International competitions ==
Year	Competition	Venue	Position	Event	Notes
Representing Brazil
1952	South American Championships	Buenos Aires, Argentina	8th (h)	400 m hurdles	56.5
1953	South American Championships (unofficial)	Santiago, Chile	4th	400 m	49.5
1953	South American Championships (unofficial)	Santiago, Chile	4th	400 m hurdles	54.0
1953	South American Championships (unofficial)	Santiago, Chile	1st	4 × 400 m relay	3:15.5
1954	South American Championships	São Paulo, Brazil	6th	400 m	50.5
1954	South American Championships	São Paulo, Brazil	3rd	400 m hurdles	54.9
1954	South American Championships	São Paulo, Brazil	1st	4 × 400 m relay	3:15.6
1956	South American Championships	Santiago, Chile	4th	400 m	49.4
1956	South American Championships	Santiago, Chile	5th	400 m hurdles	54.8
1956	Olympic Games	Melbourne, Australia	21st (h)	400 m hurdles	53.8
1957	South American Championships (unofficial)	Santiago, Chile	1st	400 m	47.5
1957	South American Championships (unofficial)	Santiago, Chile	1st	400 m hurdles	53.0
1957	South American Championships (unofficial)	Santiago, Chile	1st	4 × 400 m relay	3:15.0
1958	South American Championships	Montevideo, Uruguay	2nd	400 m	49.1
1958	South American Championships	Montevideo, Uruguay	1st	400 m hurdles	52.5
1958	South American Championships	Montevideo, Uruguay	1st	4 × 400 m relay	3:16.3
1959	South American Championships (unofficial)	São Paulo, Brazil	2nd	400 m hurdles	54.6
1959	South American Championships (unofficial)	São Paulo, Brazil	1st	4 × 400 m relay	3:16.5
1959	Pan American Games	Chicago, United States	5th	400 m hurdles	53.2
1959	Pan American Games	Chicago, United States	4th	4 × 400 m relay	3:16.1
1960	Ibero-American Games	Santiago, Chile	4th	400 m hurdles	53.7
1961	South American Championships	Lima, Peru	5th	400 m	50.7
1961	South American Championships	Lima, Peru	3rd	400 m hurdles	54.0
1961	South American Championships	Lima, Peru	3rd	4 × 400 m relay	3:18.1
1962	Ibero-American Games	Madrid, Spain	4th	400 m hurdles	54.2
1962	Ibero-American Games	Madrid, Spain	3rd	4 × 400 m relay	3:16.5
1963	South American Championships	Cali, Colombia	7th (h)	400 m hurdles	55.4
