= 1957 South American Championships in Athletics (unofficial) =

Unofficial South American Championships in Athletics
- Dates: 19-21 April, 1957
- Host city: Santiago, Chile
- Venue: Estadio Nacional
- Level: Senior
- Events: 22
- Participation: 3 nations

Unofficial South American Championships in Athletics (I Torneo de Campeones Sudamericanos) were held in Santiago, Chile in 1957. The athletics meeting was for men only with the participation from three countries Argentina, Brazil and Chile, each represented by two athletes in an event. Full results were published.

== Medal summary ==
=== Men ===
| Event | Gold | | Silver | | Bronze | |
|---|---|---|---|---|---|---|
| 100 metres | Jorge de Barros (BRA) | 10.6 | João Pires Sobrinho (BRA) | 10.7 | Gerardo Bönnhoff (ARG) | 11.0 |
| 200 metres | João Pires Sobrinho (BRA) | 21.6 | Jorge de Barros (BRA) | 21.7 | Teodoro Blaschke (CHI) | 22.2 |
| 400 metres | Ulisses dos Santos (BRA) | 47.5 AR | Anubes da Silva (BRA) | 48.2 | Hugo Krauss (CHI) | 49.1 |
| 800 metres | Ramón Sandoval (CHI) | 1:50.4 | Argemiro Roque (BRA) | 1:51.9 | Waldo Sandoval (CHI) | 1:53.7 |
| 1500 metres | Ramón Sandoval (CHI) | 3:48.4 | Eduardo Fontecilla (CHI) | 3:52.5 | Gilberto Miori (ARG) | 3:53.4 |
| 5000 metres | Jorge González (CHI) | 14:50.4 | Jaime Correa (CHI) | 14:53.4 | Armando Pino (ARG) | 15:01.4 |
| 10,000 metres | Walter Lemos (ARG) | 30:44.4 | Armando Pino (ARG) | 30:50.2 | José Calixto (BRA) | 31:41.8 |
| Half Marathon | Walter Lemos (ARG) | 1:05:14 | Alfredo de Oliveira (BRA) | 1:06:05 | Juan Silva (CHI) | 1:08:20 |
| 110 metres hurdles | Francisco Bergonzoni (BRA) | 14.8 | Héctor Henríquez (CHI) | 15.3 | Wilson Carneiro (BRA) | 15.3 |
| 400 metres hurdles | Ulisses dos Santos (BRA) | 53.0 | Anubes da Silva (BRA) | 54.0 | Pablo Eitel (CHI) | 55.6 |
| 3000 metres steeplechase | Antonio Núñez (ARG) | 9:27.8 | Santiago Novas (CHI) | 9:30.2 | José Santos Primo (BRA) | 9:37.4 |
| 4 × 100 metres relay | Brazil; João Pires Sobrinho; José Telles da Conceição; Da Silva; Jorge de Barros | 41.4 | Argentina; Pedro Marcel; Juan Ferro; Gerardo Bönnhoff; Roberto Ferrario | 41.6 | Chile; Hugo de la Fuente; Teodoro Blaschke; Patricio Letelier; Gert Wagner | 42.0 |
| 4 × 400 metres relay | Brazil; Argemiro Roque; Da Silva; Anubes da Silva; Ulisses dos Santos | 3:15.0 | Chile; Julio León; Waldo Sandoval; Ramón Sandoval; Hugo Krauss | 3:18.9 | Argentina; Humberto Cabrera; Enrique Beckles; Francisco Paganessi; Carlos Heredia | 3:21.4 |
| High jump | Ernesto Lagos (CHI) | 1.93 | Horacio Martínez (ARG) | 1.90 | José Telles da Conceição (BRA); Juan Ruiz (CHI); Oscar Bártoli (ARG) | 1.85 |
| Pole vault | Fausto de Souza (BRA) | 4.10 | José Luis Infante (CHI) | 4.00 | Ricardo Bonino (CHI) | 3.80 |
| Long jump | Eduardo Krumm (CHI) | 6.96 | Pedro Marcel (ARG) | 6.90 | Wladimiro Leighton (CHI) | 6.86 |
| Triple jump | Adhemar da Silva (BRA) | 15.59 | Ariel Standen (CHI) | 14.60 | Jorge Castillo (ARG) | 14.36 |
| Shot put | Enrique Helf (ARG) | 14.56 | Isolino Taborda (BRA) | 14.47 | Günther Kruse (ARG) | 14.38 |
| Discus throw | Günther Kruse (ARG) | 48.25 | Hernán Haddad (CHI) | 47.41 | Dieter Gevert (CHI) | 44.07 |
| Hammer throw | Bruno Strohmeier (BRA) | 54.45 | Arturo Melcher (CHI) | 51.44 | Alejandro Díaz (CHI) | 50.37 |
| Javelin throw | Ricardo Héber (ARG) | 66.54 | Nelson Matteucci (ARG) | 64.57 | Juris Laipenieks (CHI) | 61.10 |
| Decathlon | Hernán Figueroa (CHI) | 5492 | Oscar Bártoli (ARG) | 5321 | Leonardo Kittsteiner (CHI) | 5310 |

== Medal table (unofficial) ==
* Host nation (Chile)

| Rank | Nation | Gold | Silver | Bronze | Total |
|---|---|---|---|---|---|
| 1 | Brazil (BRA) | 10 | 6 | 3 | 19 |
| 2 | Chile (CHI)* | 6 | 6 | 7 | 19 |
| 3 | Argentina (ARG) | 6 | 4 | 6 | 16 |
| Totals (3 entries) | | 22 | 16 | 16 | 54 |

== Team scores (official) ==
| Rank | Country | Points |
|---|---|---|
| 1 | Brazil | 223 pts |
| 3 | Chile | 217 pts |
| 2 | Argentina | 186 pts |
