= Argemiro Roque =

Brazilian sprinter (1923–1998)

Personal information
- Nationality: Brazilian
- Born: 30 October 1923
- Died: 5 February 1998 (aged 74)

Sport
- Sport: Sprinting
- Event: 400 metres

Argemiro Roque (30 October 1923 – 5 February 1998) was a Brazilian sprinter. He competed in the men's 400 metres at the 1952 Summer Olympics.

He was the husband and first coach of the discus thrower, Odete Domingos. He also coached Conceição Geremias.

== International competitions ==
Year	Competition	Venue	Position	Event	Notes
Representing Brazil
1949	South American Championships	Lima, Peru	9th (h)	400 m	50.9
1949	South American Championships	Lima, Peru	–	800 m	NT
1949	South American Championships	Lima, Peru	1st	4 × 400 m relay	3:19.7
1951	Pan American Games	Buenos Aires, Argentina	5th	800 m	1:54.6e
1952	South American Championships	Buenos Aires, Argentina	2nd	400 m	49.1
1952	South American Championships	Buenos Aires, Argentina	1st	800 m	49.1
1952	South American Championships	Buenos Aires, Argentina	1st	4 × 400 m relay	3:17.5
1952	Olympic Games	Helsinki, Finland	31st (h)	400 m	49.05
1952	Olympic Games	Helsinki, Finland	21st (h)	800 m	1:54.1
1953	South American Championships (unofficial)	Santiago, Chile	1st	400 m	48.2
1953	South American Championships (unofficial)	Santiago, Chile	2nd	800 m	1:53.7
1953	South American Championships (unofficial)	Santiago, Chile	1st	4 × 400 m relay	3:15.5
1954	South American Championships	São Paulo, Brazil	2nd	400 m	49.1
1954	South American Championships	São Paulo, Brazil	2nd	800 m	1:53.6
1954	South American Championships	São Paulo, Brazil	1st	4 × 400 m relay	3:15.6
1955	Pan American Games	Mexico City, Mexico	9th (sf)	400 m	48.55
1955	Pan American Games	Mexico City, Mexico	6th	800 m	1:53.98
1955	Pan American Games	Mexico City, Mexico	5th	4 × 400 m relay	3:16.71
1956	South American Championships	Santiago, Chile	3rd	400 m	49.0
1956	South American Championships	Santiago, Chile	3rd	800 m	1:52.4
1956	South American Championships	Santiago, Chile	2nd	4 × 400 m relay	3:16.1
1957	South American Championships (unofficial)	Santiago, Chile	2nd	800 m	1:51.9
1957	South American Championships (unofficial)	Santiago, Chile	1st	4 × 400 m relay	3:15.0
1958	South American Championships	Montevideo, Uruguay	1st	400 m	48.6
1958	South American Championships	Montevideo, Uruguay	3rd	800 m	1:52.6
1958	South American Championships	Montevideo, Uruguay	1st	4 × 400 m relay	3:16.3
1959	South American Championships (unofficial)	São Paulo, Brazil	1st	4 × 400 m relay	3:16.5
1959	Pan American Games	Chicago, United States	7th (h)	400 m	NT
1959	Pan American Games	Chicago, United States	13th (h)	800 m	1:55.3
1959	Pan American Games	Chicago, United States	4th	4 × 400 m relay	3:16.1

== Decorations ==
Order of Military Merit (Knight; Brazil)
