= Jorge de Barros =

Brazilian sprinter (born 1935)

Personal information
- Nationality: Brazilian
- Born: 26 April 1935 (age 91) Rio de Janeiro, Brazil

Sport
- Sport: Sprinting
- Event: 100 metres

Jorge Machado de Barros (born 26 April 1935) is a retired Brazilian sprinter. He competed in the men's 100 metres at the 1956 Summer Olympics.

De Barros is a Physical Education teacher at the Centro Esportivo Virtual. He won medals at the 1956, 1958, and 1961 South American Championships in Athletics, including gold medals in the 4 × 100 m relays at the former two championships. He is also a multiple-time Campeonato Carioca champion in athletics representing Fluminense FC.

== International competitions ==
Year	Competition	Venue	Position	Event	Notes
Representing Brazil
1956	South American Championships	Santiago, Chile	4th (h)	100 m	10.9
1956	South American Championships	Santiago, Chile	1st	4 × 100 m relay	41.4
1956	Olympic Games	Melbourne, Australia	33rd (h)	100 m	11.15
1956	Olympic Games	Melbourne, Australia	22nd (h)	200 m	23.88
1956	Olympic Games	Melbourne, Australia	12th (h)	4 × 100 m relay	43.8
1957	South American Championships (unofficial)	Santiago, Chile	1st	100 m	10.6
1957	South American Championships (unofficial)	Santiago, Chile	2nd	200 m	21.7
1957	South American Championships (unofficial)	Santiago, Chile	1st	4 × 100 m relay	41.4
1958	South American Championships	Montevideo, Uruguay	4th	100 m	10.8
1958	South American Championships	Montevideo, Uruguay	2nd	200 m	22.3
1958	South American Championships	Montevideo, Uruguay	1st	4 × 100 m relay	41.3
1959	South American Championships (unofficial)	São Paulo, Brazil	3rd	100 m	10.8
1959	South American Championships (unofficial)	São Paulo, Brazil	3rd	200 m	22.1
1959	South American Championships (unofficial)	São Paulo, Brazil	1st	4 × 100 m relay	41.2
1959	Pan American Games	Chicago, United States	19th (h)	100 m	10.9
1959	Pan American Games	Chicago, United States	12th (h)	200 m	22.1
1959	Pan American Games	Chicago, United States	4th	4 × 100 m relay	41.6
1961	South American Championships	Lima, Peru	2nd	4 × 100 m relay	41.5
1965	Universiade	Budapest, Hungary	12th (h)	4 × 100 m relay	42.1

== Personal bests ==
- 100 metres – 10.6h (1956)
- 200 metres – 21.3h (1956)
