= Fermín Donazar =

Uruguayan long jumper (1933–2018)

Personal information
- Full name: Fermín Walter Donazar Zabalza
- Nationality: Uruguayan
- Born: 11 January 1933 Montevideo, Uruguay
- Died: 27 September 2018 (aged 85) Montevideo, Uruguay
- Height: 1.73 m (5 ft 8 in)
- Weight: 71 kg (157 lb)

Sport
- Sport: Athletics
- Event: Long jump

Fermín Walter Donazar Zabalza (11 January 1933 – 27 September 2018) was a Uruguayan athlete. He competed in the men's long jump at the 1956 Summer Olympics and the 1960 Summer Olympics.

== International competitions ==
Year	Competition	Venue	Position	Event	Notes
Representing Uruguay
1952	South American Championships	Buenos Aires, Argentina	10th	Long jump	6.32 m
1952	South American Championships	Buenos Aires, Argentina	8th	Triple jump	13.64 m
1953	South American Championships (unofficial)	Santiago, Chile	– (h)	4 × 100 m relay	DQ
1953	South American Championships (unofficial)	Santiago, Chile	4th	Long jump	6.91 m
1953	South American Championships (unofficial)	Santiago, Chile	6th	Triple jump	13.54 m
1954	South American Championships	São Paulo, Brazil	5th	4 × 100 m relay	42.4 s
1954	South American Championships	São Paulo, Brazil	1st	Long jump	7.51 m (w)
1954	South American Championships	São Paulo, Brazil	8th	Triple jump	13.64 m
1955	Pan American Games	Mexico City, Mexico	8th	Long jump	7.11 m
1955	Pan American Games	Mexico City, Mexico	7th	Triple jump	14.34 m
1956	South American Championships	Santiago, Chile	14th (h)	100 m	11.2 s
1956	South American Championships	Santiago, Chile	4th	4 × 100 m relay	43.0 s
1956	South American Championships	Santiago, Chile	1st	Long jump	7.23 m
1956	Olympic Games	Melbourne, Australia	12th	Long jump	6.57 m
1958	South American Championships	Montevideo, Uruguay	5th	4 × 100 m relay	42.9 s
1958	South American Championships	Montevideo, Uruguay	1st	Long jump	7.24 m
1960	Olympic Games	Rome, Italy	23rd (q)	Long jump	7.24 m
1961	South American Championships	Lima, Peru	6th	4 × 100 m relay	43.9 s
1961	South American Championships	Lima, Peru	3rd	Long jump	6.92 m
1962	Ibero-American Games	Madrid, Spain	11th (q)	Long jump	6.68 m

== Personal bests ==
- Long jump – 7.31 metres (1956)
