= 1954 South American Championships in Athletics =

- Dates: 17–25 April
- Host city: São Paulo, Brazil
- Venue: Estadio Municipal de Pacaembu
- Events: 31

The 1954 South American Championships in Athletics were held at the Estadio Municipal de Pacaembu in Brazil's largest city, São Paulo, between 17 and 25 April.

== Medal summary ==
=== Men's events ===
Event	Gold		Silver		Bronze	
100 metres (wind: +1.9 m/s)	Paulo da Fonseca; Brazil	10.6	José Telles da Conceição; Brazil	10.7	Benedito Ferreira; Brazil	10.7
200 metres	José Telles da Conceição; Brazil	21.2 AR	Jaime Aparicio; Colombia	21.7	Paulo da Fonseca; Brazil	21.8
400 metres	Mário do Nascimento; Brazil	48.3 AR	Argemiro Roque; Brazil	49.1	Ramón Sandoval; Chile	49.5
800 metres	Ramón Sandoval; Chile	1:50.9 CR	Argemiro Roque; Brazil	1:53.6	Odilon Netto; Brazil	1:54.2
1500 metres	Jaime Correa; Chile	3:56.5 CR	Guillermo Solá; Chile	3:57.2	Santiago Novas; Chile	3:57.7
5000 metres	Jaime Correa; Chile	15:00.6	Santiago Novas; Chile	15:07.8	Edgard Mitt; Brazil	15:14.1
10,000 metres	Jaime Correa; Chile	31:41.0	Geraldo Alves; Brazil	32:14.5	Luís Rodrigues; Brazil	32:30.5
Half marathon	Geraldo Alves; Brazil	1:13:02	Joaquín da Silva; Brazil	1:13:43	José Pérez; Chile	1:15:48
110 metres hurdles (wind: +4.2 m/s)	Wilson Carneiro; Brazil	14.3w	Teófilo Davis; Venezuela	14.5w	Juan Leiva; Venezuela	14.8w
400 metres hurdles	Jaime Aparicio; Colombia	52.2 CR	Wilson Carneiro; Brazil	53.5	Ulisses dos Santos; Brazil	54.9
3000 metres steeplechase	Edgard Mitt; Brazil	9:14.9 AR	Guillermo Solá; Chile	9:16.0	Santiago Novas; Chile	9:26.6
4 × 100 metres relay	Brazil; Francisco Kadlec; Benedito Ferreira; Paulo da Fonseca; José Telles da Conceição	40.8 CR	Peru; Gerardo Salazar; Máximo Reyes; Óscar Maldonado; Guillermo Sebastiani	41.8	Venezuela; Apolinar Solórzano; Guillermo Gutiérrez; Juan Leiva; Teófilo Davis Bell	42.2
4 × 400 metres relay	Brazil; Argemiro Roque; Ulisses dos Santos; Armando da Silva; Mário do Nascimento	3:15.6 CR	Chile; Segundo Peña; Waldo Sandoval; Gustavo Ehlers; Ramón Sandoval	3:16.9	Venezuela; Guillermo Gutiérrez; Apolinar Solórzano; Filemón Camacho; Juan Leiva	3:21.0
High jump	José Telles da Conceição; Brazil	2.00 AR	Ernesto Lagos; Chile	1.95	Adilton Luz; Brazil	1.90
Pole vault	Brígido Iriarte; Venezuela	3.90	Carlos Moschen; Brazil	3.90	Fausto de Souza; Brazil	3.90
Long jump	Fermín Donazar; Uruguay	7.51w	Mário Gonzales; Brazil	7.47w	Ary de Sá; Brazil	7.19
Triple jump	Adhemar da Silva; Brazil	16.22 =AR	Hélio da Silva; Brazil	14.86	Renato do Nascimento; Brazil	14.70
Shot put	Alcides Dambrós; Brazil	15.32 CR	Nadim Marreis; Brazil	13.81	Armín Neverman; Chile	13.79
Discus throw	Eduardo Julve; Peru	47.44	Hernán Haddad; Chile	46.52	Alcides Dambrós; Brazil	45.09
Hammer throw	Walter Kupper; Brazil	50.65	Alejandro Díaz; Chile	50.04	Arturo Melcher; Chile	49.47
Javelin throw	Carlos Monge; Peru	61.33	Janis Stendzenieks; Chile	60.88	Francisco Céspedes; Chile	56.81
Decathlon	Francisco Moura; Brazil	6047	Brígido Iriarte; Venezuela	6002	Aldo Ribeiro; Brazil	5765

=== Women's events ===
Event	Gold		Silver		Bronze	
100 metres (wind: +2.7 m/s)	Benedicta de Oliveira; Brazil	12.3w	Deyse de Castro; Brazil	12.3w	Elda Selamé; Chile	12.3w
200 metres	Deyse de Castro; Brazil	25.7	Elda Selamé; Chile	25.8	Benedicta de Oliveira; Brazil	26.2
80 metres hurdles	Wanda dos Santos; Brazil	11.4 CR	Eliana Gaete; Chile	11.9	Delia Díaz; Uruguay	12.2
4 × 100 metres relay	Chile; Aurora Bianchi; Elda Selamé; Eliana Gaete; Betty Kretschmer	48.4 CR	Brazil; Deyse de Castro; Elizabeth Müller; Melânia Luz; Benedita de Oliveira	48.5		
High jump	Delia Díaz; Uruguay	1.55	Elizabeth Müller; Brazil	1.55	Deyse de Castro; Brazil	1.55
Long jump	Lisa Peters; Chile	5.75 CR	Deyse de Castro; Brazil	5.47	Wanda dos Santos; Brazil	5.42
Shot put	Elizabeth Müller; Brazil	11.79	Pradelia Delgado; Chile	11.70	Vera Trezoitko; Brazil	11.60
Discus throw	Erika Trömel; Chile	39.84	Ilse Gerdau; Brazil	39.40	Pradelia Delgado; Chile	38.23
Javelin throw	Anneliese Schmidt; Brazil	42.07 CR	Marlene Ahrens; Chile	41.68	Carmen Venegas; Chile	41.65

== Medal table ==
Rank	Nation	Gold	Silver	Bronze	Total
1	Brazil (BRA)	18	15	16	49
2	Chile (CHI)	7	12	10	29
3	Peru (PER)	2	1	0	3
4	Uruguay (URU)	2	0	1	3
5	Venezuela (VEN)	1	2	3	6
6	Colombia (COL)	1	1	0	2
Totals (6 entries)		31	31	30	92

== Team scores ==
=== Combined ===
Rank	Country	Points
1	Brazil	431.5
2	Chile	279.5
3	Peru	61
4	Venezuela	51
5	Uruguay	40
6	Colombia	19

=== Men ===
Rank	Country	Points
1	Brazil	315
2	Chile	77
3	Peru	61
4	Venezuela	51
5	Uruguay	23
6	Colombia	19

=== Women ===
Rank	Country	Points
1	Brazil	116.5
2	Chile	102.5
3	Uruguay	17
4	Colombia	2
4	Peru	2
