= Ricardo Héber =

Argentine javelin thrower (1927–2002)

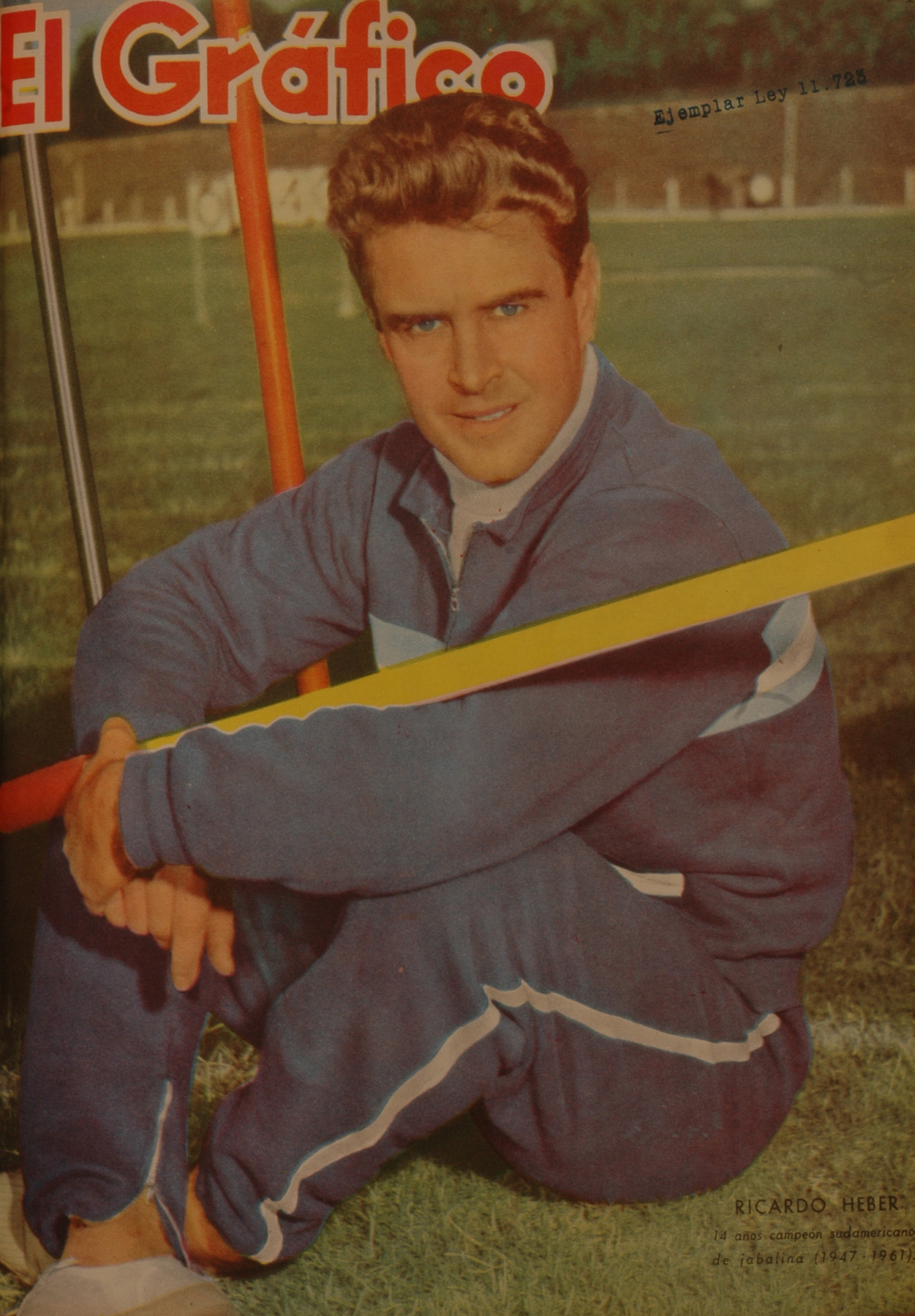
- Ricardo Heber in 1961

Personal information
- Full name: Ricardo Matías Héber
- Born: 28 September 1927 Buenos Aires, Argentina
- Died: 14 August 2002 (aged 74) Buenos Aires, Argentina
- Height: 1.78 m (5 ft 10 in)
- Weight: 76 kg (168 lb)

Sport
- Sport: Athletics
- Event: Javelin throw

Ricardo Matías Héber (28 September 1927 – 14 August 2002) was an Argentine javelin thrower who competed in the 1948 Summer Olympics and in the 1952 Summer Olympics. He placed first in the 1951 Pan American Games javelin throw and second in the 1955 Pan American Games javelin throw.

Heber competed for the Arizona State Sun Devils track and field team under the name Richard Heber.

== International competitions ==
Year	Competition	Venue	Position	Event	Notes
Representing Argentina
1947	South American Championships	Rio de Janeiro, Brazil	1st	Javelin throw (old)	59.59 m
1948	Olympic Games	London, United Kingdom	13th (q)	Javelin throw (old)	60.82 m
1949	South American Championships	Lima, Peru	1st	Javelin throw (old)	65.56 m
1951	Pan American Games	Buenos Aires, Argentina	1st	Javelin throw (old)	68.08 m
1952	South American Championships	Buenos Aires, Argentina	1st	Javelin throw (old)	67.68 m
1952	South American Championships	Buenos Aires, Argentina	4th	Decathlon	5793 pts
1952	Olympic Games	Helsinki, Finland	15th (q)	Javelin throw (old)	62.82 m
1953	South American Championships (unofficial)	Santiago, Chile	1st	Javelin throw (old)	68.23 m
1953	South American Championships (unofficial)	Santiago, Chile	8th	Decathlon	4414 pts
1955	Pan American Games	Mexico City, Mexico	2nd	Javelin throw (old)	66.15 m
1956	South American Championships	Santiago, Chile	1st	Javelin throw (old)	64.45 m
1957	South American Championships (unofficial)	Santiago, Chile	1st	Javelin throw (old)	66.54 m
1957	South American Championships (unofficial)	Santiago, Chile	6th	Decathlon	4884 pts
1958	South American Championships	Montevideo, Uruguay	1st	Javelin throw (old)	65.78 m
1959	South American Championships (unofficial)	São Paulo, Brazil	1st	Javelin throw (old)	65.85 m
1960	Ibero-American Games	Santiago, Chile	8th	Javelin throw (old)	59.35 m
1961	South American Championships	Lima, Peru	1st	Javelin throw (old)	64.25 m
1962	Ibero-American Games	Madrid, Spain	2nd	Javelin throw (old)	65.36 m
1963	South American Championships	Cali, Colombia	4th	Javelin throw (old)	63.13 m
1963	Pan American Games	Chicago, United States	7th	Javelin throw (old)	60.22 m
1965	South American Championships	Rio de Janeiro, Brazil	4th	Javelin throw (old)	62.89 m
1969	South American Championships	Quito, Ecuador	5th	Javelin throw (old)	61.12 m
1971	South American Championships	Lima, Peru	6th	Javelin throw (old)	59.34 m

== Personal bests ==
- Javelin throw (old model) – 71.04 (Buenos Aires 1951)

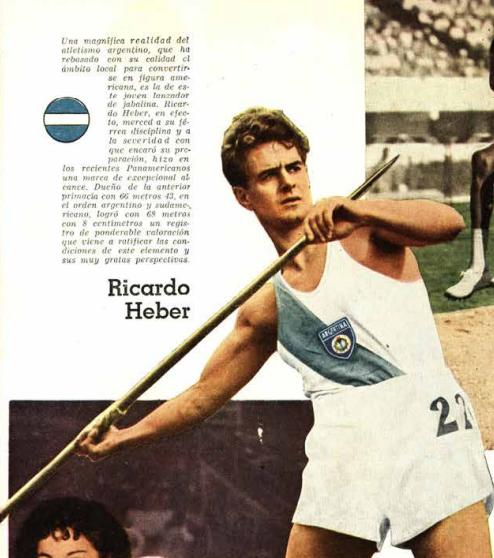
Argentine javelin thrower Ricardo Heber in 1951
