= Sebastião Mendes (athlete) =

Personal information
- Full name: Sebastião "Tião" Celso Mendes da Costa
- Nationality: Brazilian
- Born: 22 August 1930 Niterói, Rio de Janeiro, Brazil
- Died: missing since March 2007, presumed dead
- Height: 1.79 m (5 ft 10 in)
- Weight: 66 kg (146 lb)

Sport
- Sport: Athletics
- Events: 3000 metres steeplechase, 1500 metres
- Club: CR Flamengo

Sebastião "Tião" Celso Mendes da Costa (born 22 August 1930 – missing since March 2007) was a Brazilian long-distance runner competing specialising in the 3000 metres steeplechase. He won multiple medals at regional level including the silver at the 1963 Pan American Games. He was set to compete at the 1960 Summer Olympics in Rome but was a non-starter. He went missing in March 2007 and was never found.

== International competitions ==
Year	Competition	Venue	Position	Event	Notes
Representing Brazil
1955	Pan American Games	Mexico City, Mexico	3rd (h)	1500 m	4:12.94
1956	South American Championships	Santiago, Chile	6th	800 m	1:54.3
1956	South American Championships	Santiago, Chile	4th	1500 m	3:55.2
1956	South American Championships	Santiago, Chile	2nd	3000 m s'chase	9:17.4
1958	South American Championships	Lima, Peru	6th	1500 m	3:55.7
1958	South American Championships	Lima, Peru	1st	3000 m s'chase	9:20.0
1959	South American Championships (unofficial)	São Paulo, Brazil	6th	1500 m	4:06.0
1959	South American Championships (unofficial)	São Paulo, Brazil	5th	3000 m s'chase	9:21.7
1959	Pan American Games	Chicago, United States	4th	3000 m s'chase	9:02.2
1960	Ibero-American Games	Santiago, Chile	4th	1500 m	3:58.0
1960	Ibero-American Games	Santiago, Chile	1st	3000 m s'chase	9:01.8
1961	South American Championships	Lima, Peru	1st	3000 m s'chase	9:14.8
1962	Ibero-American Games	Madrid, Spain	8th	1500 m	4:02.5
1962	Ibero-American Games	Madrid, Spain	3rd	3000 m s'chase	9:16.4
1963	Pan American Games	São Paulo, Brazil	2nd	3000 m s'chase	9:12.8
1963	South American Championships	Cali, Colombia	2nd	3000 m s'chase	9:28.7
1965	South American Championships	Rio de Janeiro, Brazil	3rd	3000 m s'chase	9:22.2
1967	South American Championships	Buenos Aires, Argentina	5th	3000 m s'chase	9:28.2
