= Osvaldo Suárez =

Argentine long-distance runner

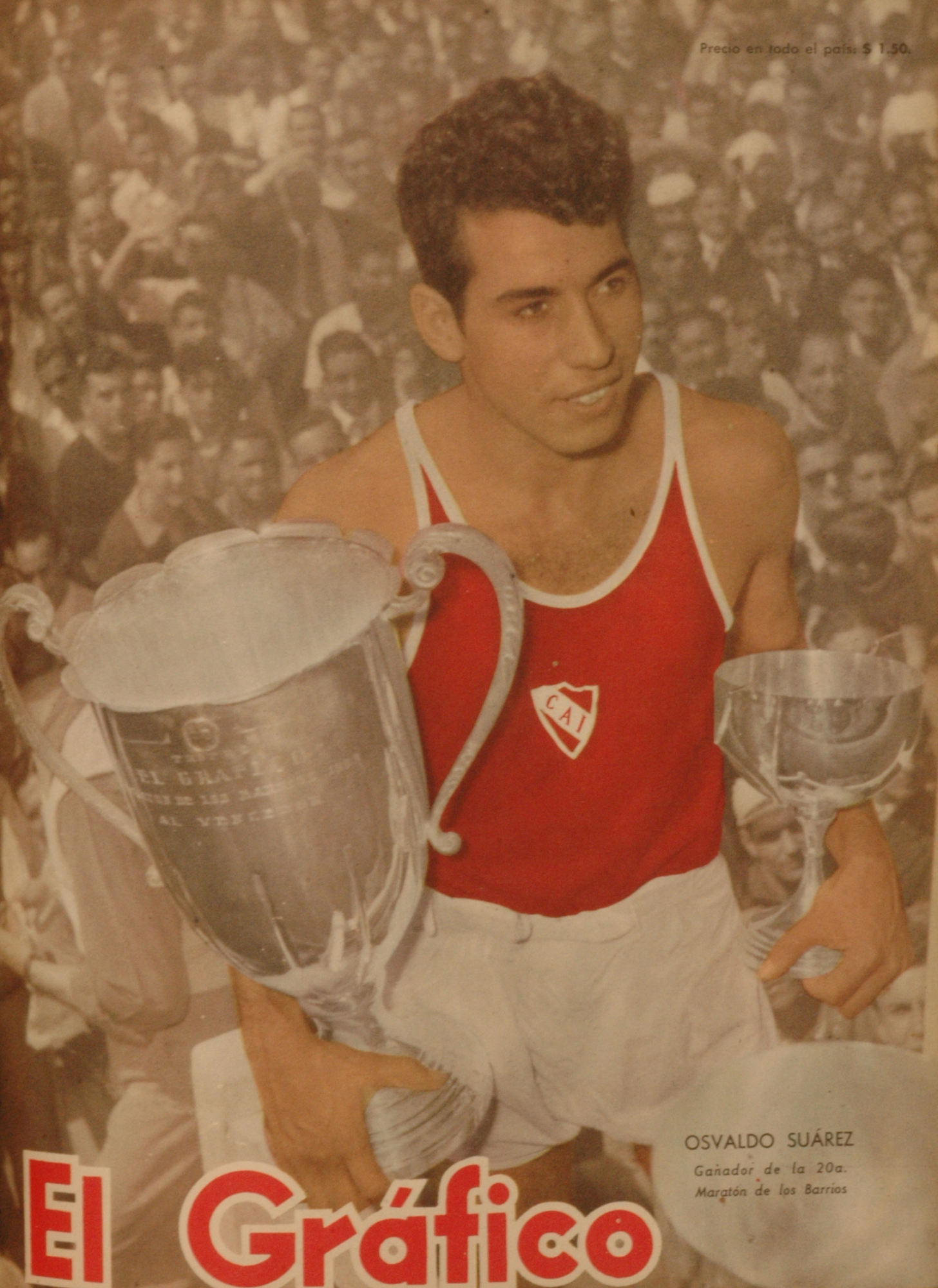

Personal information
- Full name: Osvaldo Roberto Suárez
- Born: 17 March 1934 Wilde, Buenos Aires
- Died: 16 February 2018 (aged 83)
- Height: 1.76 m (5 ft 9 in)
- Weight: 65 kg (143 lb)
Medal record
Men's Athletics
Representing Argentina
Pan American Games
| Gold medal – first place | 1955 Mexico City | 5000 metres |
| Gold medal – first place | 1955 Mexico City | 10,000 metres |
| Gold medal – first place | 1959 Chicago | 10,000 metres |
| Gold medal – first place | 1963 Sao Paulo | 5000 metres |
| Silver medal – second place | 1959 Chicago | 5000 metres |
| Silver medal – second place | 1963 Sao Paulo | 10,000 metres |
Ibero-American Games
| Gold medal – first place | 1960 Santiago | 5000 metres |
| Gold medal – first place | 1960 Santiago | 10,000 metres |
| Gold medal – first place | 1960 Santiago | Marathon |

Osvaldo Roberto Suárez (17 March 1934 in Wilde – 16 February 2018) was an Argentine long-distance runner who won four gold medals at the Pan American Games. He was punished by the Revolución Libertadora (The Liberating Revolution) and blamed for receiving favors to travel (even being a famous and successful athlete), so he could not be at the 1956 Melbourne Olympic Games. After that, he represented his native country at two Summer Olympics, in 1960 and 1964. After retiring from his running career, he became a professional athletics coach.

== International competitions ==
| Year | Competition | Venue | Position | Event | Notes |
Representing Argentina
| 1952 | South American Championships | Buenos Aires, Argentina | 6th | 1500 m | 4:02.9 |
| 1953 | South American Championships (unofficial) | Santiago, Chile | 1st | 5000 m | 15:23.1 |
| 1955 | Pan American Games | Mexico City, Mexico | 1st | 5000 m | 15:30.6 |
| 1955 | Pan American Games | Mexico City, Mexico | 1st | 10,000 m | 32:42.6 |
| 1956 | South American Championships | Santiago, Chile | 1st | 5000 m | 14:30.8 |
| 1956 | South American Championships | Santiago, Chile | 1st | 10,000 m | 30:12.2 |
| 1956 | South American Championships | Santiago, Chile | 1st | Half marathon | 1:08:54 |
| 1958 | South American Championships | Montevideo, Uruguay | 1st | 5000 m | 14:26.1 |
| 1958 | South American Championships | Montevideo, Uruguay | 1st | 10,000 m | 30:37.2 |
| 1958 | South American Championships | Montevideo, Uruguay | 1st | Half marathon | 1:12:38 |
| 1958 | Saint Silvester Road Race | São Paulo, Brazil | 1st | 7.4 km | 21:40 |
| 1959 | World Festival of Youth and Students | Vienna, Austria | 3rd | 5000 m | 14:14.4 |
| 1959 | Pan American Games | Chicago, United States | 2nd | 5000 m | 14:28.5 |
| 1959 | Pan American Games | Chicago, United States | 1st | 10,000 m | 30:17.2 |
| 1959 | Saint Silvester Road Race | São Paulo, Brazil | 1st | 7.4 km | 21:55 |
| 1960 | Olympic Games | Rome, Italy | 9th | Marathon | 2:21:26.6 |
| 1960 | Ibero-American Games | Santiago, Chile | 1st | 5000 m | 14:29.0 |
| 1960 | Ibero-American Games | Santiago, Chile | 1st | 10,000 m | 30:26.0 |
| 1960 | Ibero-American Games | Santiago, Chile | 1st | Marathon | 2:38:23 |
| 1960 | Saint Silvester Road Race | São Paulo, Brazil | 1st | 7.4 km | 22:02 |
| 1961 | South American Championships | Lima, Peru | 2nd | 1500 m | 3:53.5 |
| 1961 | South American Championships | Lima, Peru | 1st | 5000 m | 14:54.7 |
| 1961 | South American Championships | Lima, Peru | 1st | 10,000 m | 30:18.1 |
| 1962 | Ibero-American Games | Madrid, Spain | 3rd | 1500 m | 3:53.4 |
| 1962 | Ibero-American Games | Madrid, Spain | 1st | 5000 m | 14:31.6 |
| 1962 | Ibero-American Games | Madrid, Spain | 1st | 10,000 m | 30:14.2 |
| 1963 | Pan American Games | São Paulo, Brazil | 1st | 5000 m | 14:25.81 |
| 1963 | Pan American Games | São Paulo, Brazil | 2nd | 10,000 m | 30:26.56 |
| 1963 | South American Championships | Cali, Colombia | 1st | 5000 m | 14:59.8 |
| 1963 | South American Championships | Cali, Colombia | 1st | 10,000 m | 31:09.6 |
| 1964 | Olympic Games | Tokyo, Japan | – | Marathon | DNF |
| 1967 | Pan American Games | Winnipeg, Canada | 5th | 5000 m | 14:19.4 |
| 1967 | Pan American Games | Winnipeg, Canada | – | 10,000 m | DNF |
| 1967 | South American Championships | Buenos Aires, Argentina | 2nd | 5000 m | 14:48.0 |
| 1967 | South American Championships | Buenos Aires, Argentina | 1st | 10,000 m | 30:50.8 |
| 1969 | South American Championships | Quito, Ecuador | 11th (h) | 1500 m | 4:13.8 |

== Personal bests ==
- 1500 metres – 3:50.8h (Barcelona 1962)
- Mile – 4:16.3h (Buenos Aires 1953, former NR)
- 2000 metres – 5:21.0h (Villa Dominico 1961, former NR)
- 3000 metres – 8:12.0h (Munich 1959, former NR)
- 5000 metres – 14:05.0h (San Sebastián 1960, former NR)
- 10,000 metres – 29:26.0h (Prague 1959, former NR)
- Half marathon – 1:08:54 (Santiago 1956, former NR)
- Marathon – 2:21:27 (Rome 1960, former NR)

Awards
| Preceded by (Argentina) Pedro Dellacha | Olimpia de Oro; 1958 | Succeeded by (Argentina) Luis Thompson |
