= João Pires Sobrinho =

Brazilian sprinter

Personal information
- Born: 6 October 1934 (age 91) Rio de Janeiro, Brazil

Sport
- Sport: Sprinting
- Event: 100 metres

João Pires Sobrinho (born 6 October 1934) is a Brazilian sprinter. He competed in the men's 100 metres at the 1956 Summer Olympics.

Sobrinho won medals at the 1956 and 1958 South American Championships in Athletics, as well as at the 1960 Ibero-American Games.

== International competitions ==
| Year | Competition | Venue | Position | Event | Notes |
Representing Brazil
| 1956 | South American Championships | Santiago, Chile | 3rd | 100 m | 10.7 |
| 1956 | South American Championships | Santiago, Chile | 1st | 200 m | 21.5 |
| 1956 | South American Championships | Santiago, Chile | 1st | 4 × 100 m relay | 41.4 |
| 1956 | Olympic Games | Melbourne, Australia | 6th (h) | 200 m | 21.67 |
| 1956 | Olympic Games | Melbourne, Australia | 12th (h) | 4 × 100 m relay | 43.8 |
| 1957 | South American Championships (unofficial) | Santiago, Chile | 2nd | 100 m | 10.7 |
| 1957 | South American Championships (unofficial) | Santiago, Chile | 1st | 200 m | 21.6 |
| 1957 | South American Championships (unofficial) | Santiago, Chile | 1st | 4 × 100 m relay | 41.4 |
| 1958 | South American Championships | Montevideo, Uruguay | 3rd | 100 m | 10.8 |
| 1958 | South American Championships | Montevideo, Uruguay | 4th | 200 m | 22.4 |
| 1958 | South American Championships | Montevideo, Uruguay | 1st | 4 × 100 m relay | 41.3 |
| 1959 | Pan American Games | Chicago, United States | 10th (sf) | 100 m | 10.6 |
| 1959 | Pan American Games | Chicago, United States | 17th (h) | 200 m | 22.2 |
| 1959 | Pan American Games | Chicago, United States | 4th | 4 × 400 m relay | 3:16.1 |
| 1960 | Ibero-American Games | Santiago, Chile | 5th (sf) | 100 m | 10.6^{1} |
| 1960 | Ibero-American Games | Santiago, Chile | 2nd | 4 × 100 m relay | 40.6 |
| 1961 | South American Championships | Lima, Peru | 11th (sf) | 100 m | 11.6 |
| 1961 | South American Championships | Lima, Peru | 11th (sf) | 200 m | 22.7 |

^{1}Disqualified in the final

== Personal bests ==
- 100 metres – 10.4h (1960)
- 200 metres – 21.3h (1956)
