= Erbetta =

Erbetta is a surname. Notable people with the surname include:

- Fernando Maturana Erbetta (1925–1995), Chilean lawyer and politician
- Gladys Erbetta (1928–2026), Argentine sprinter
