= Carlos Sierra =

Colombian sprinter

Personal information
- Full name: Carlos E. Sierra Gutiérrez
- Nationality: Colombian
- Born: c. 1932
- Died: July 2014

Sport
- Sport: Sprinting
- Event: 4 × 400 metres relay

Carlos E. Sierra Gutiérrez (c. 1932 – July 2014) was a Colombian sprinter. He competed in the men's 4 × 400 metres relay at the 1956 Summer Olympics.

== International competitions ==
Year	Competition	Venue	Position	Event	Notes
Representing Colombia
1955	Pan American Games	Mexico City, Mexico	25th (h)	100 m	11.61
1955	Pan American Games	Mexico City, Mexico	6th	4 × 400 m relay	3:20.08
1956	South American Championships	Santiago, Chile	17th (h)	200 m	22.8
1956	South American Championships	Santiago, Chile	9th (h)	400 m	50.0
1956	South American Championships	Santiago, Chile	1st	4 × 400 m relay	3:14.6
1956	Olympic Games	Melbourne, Australia	14th (h)	4 × 400 m relay	3:27.4
