= Patricio Letelier =

Chilean mathematical physicist

Patricio Anibal Letelier Sotomayor (September 11, 1943 – June 9, 2011) was a Chilean mathematical physicist and professor at University of Campinas (UNICAMP).

== Work ==
Letelier was born in Santiago. Early in his career (1993) Letelier worked with Dmitrii Vladimirovich Gal'tsov to define what has become known as the Letelier-Gal'tsov spacetime. He received his Ph.D. in Physics from the Boston University in 1977 under John Stachel. He joined the faculty of the University of Brasília until 1988 when became a Professor of Mathematical Physics in the Department of Applied Mathematics of UNICAMP.

He died on Thursday, June 9, 2011 of a cardiac arrest in his home in Campinas.

In honor of his work, an astronomer he advised for a doctor thesis, named an asteroid he had discovered after Letelier: (109879) Letelier.
