= 1958 South American Championships in Athletics =

- Dates: 19–27 April
- Host city: Montevideo, Uruguay
- Venue: Pista del Parque Batlle y Ordoñez
- Events: 31
- Participation: 8 nations

The 1958 South American Championships in Athletics were held between 19 and 27 April at the Pista del Parque Batlle y Ordoñez in Montevideo, Uruguay.

== Medal summary ==
=== Men's events ===
Event	Gold		Silver		Bronze	
100 metres (wind: -2.0 m/s)	José Telles da Conceição; Brazil	10.5 =CR	Luis Vienna; Argentina	10.6	João Pires Sobrinho; Brazil	10.8
200 metres	José Telles da Conceição; Brazil	21.6	Jorge de Barros; Brazil	22.3	Guillermo Sebastiani; Peru	22.4
400 metres	Argemiro Roque; Brazil	48.6	Ulisses dos Santos; Brazil	49.1	Geraldo Costa; Brazil	49.5
800 metres	Ramón Sandoval; Chile	1:49.6	Eduardo Balducci; Argentina	1:51.3	Argemiro Roque; Brazil	1:52.6
1500 metres	Ramón Sandoval; Chile	3:47.5 AR	Gilberto Miori; Argentina	3:51.3	Eduardo Balducci; Argentina	3:51.3
5000 metres	Osvaldo Suárez; Argentina	14:26.1 CR	Walter Lemos; Argentina	14:40.6	Luis Sandobal; Argentina	14:49.2
10,000 metres	Osvaldo Suárez; Argentina	30:37.2	Walter Lemos; Argentina	30:37.4	Armando Pino; Argentina	31:23.0
Half marathon	Osvaldo Suárez; Argentina	1:12:38	Armando Pino; Argentina	1:13:29	Juan Silva; Chile	1:13:45
110 metres hurdles	Wilson Carneiro; Brazil	14.9	Francisco Bergonzoni; Brazil	15.1	Ijoel da Silva; Brazil	15.1
400 metres hurdles	Ulisses dos Santos; Brazil	52.5	Jaime Aparicio; Colombia	52.6	Erwino Stobaus; Brazil	54.2
3000 metres steeplechase	Sebastião Mendes; Brazil	9:20.0	Santiago Novas; Chile	9:20.4	Alberto Ríos; Argentina	9:29.8
4 × 100 metres relay	Brazil; Affonso da Silva; Jorge de Barros; João Pires Sobrinho; José da Conceição	41.3	Argentina; Pedro Marcel; Juan Carlos Salom; Vicente Giorgio; Luis Vienna	41.8	Chile; Eduardo Bezanilla; Teodoro Blaschke; Hugo de la Fuente; Gert Wagner	42.2
4 × 400 metres relay	Brazil; Ulisses dos Santos; Mário do Nascimento; Geraldo Costa; Argemiro Roque	3:16.3	Peru; Ramón Sánchez; José Laca; Guillermo Sebastiani; Eulogio Gomes	3:17.4	Argentina; Roberto Batistelo; Víctor Lozano; Eduardo Balducci; Francisco Paganesi	3:18.5
High jump	José Telles da Conceição; Brazil	1.90	Alfredo Lopes; Brazil	1.90	Oscar Bártoli; Argentina; Reinaldo de Oliveira; Brazil; Ernesto Lagos; Chile; Horacio Martínez; Argentina; Juan Ruiz; Chile	1.80
Pole vault	José Luis Infante; Chile	4.00 =CR	Fausto de Souza; Brazil	3.90	Carlos Kreuz; Argentina	3.80
Long jump	Fermín Donazar; Uruguay	7.24	Ary de Sá; Brazil	7.18	Eduardo Krumm; Chile	7.11
Triple jump	Adhemar da Silva; Brazil	15.70	Reinaldo de Oliveira; Brazil	14.78	Itiro Nakaie; Brazil	14.60
Shot put	Enrique Helf; Argentina	15.41 CR	Isolino Taborda; Brazil	15.00	Rubén Scaraffia; Argentina	14.67
Discus throw	Hernán Haddad; Chile	49.10 CR	Günther Kruse; Argentina	47.43	Pedro Ucke; Argentina	46.49
Hammer throw	Alejandro Díaz; Chile	54.45 CR	Walter Kupper; Brazil	51.77	Walter Rodrigues; Brazil	51.69
Javelin throw	Ricardo Héber; Argentina	65.78	Walter de Almeida; Brazil	65.14	Janis Laipenieks; Chile	60.14
Decathlon	Leonardo Kittsteiner; Chile	5645	Yelton Bagnasco; Uruguay	5634	Mario Cachile; Argentina	5547

=== Women's events ===
Event	Gold		Silver		Bronze	
100 metres	Martha Huby; Peru	12.4	Marlene Porto; Brazil	12.5	Nancy Correa; Chile	12.5
200 metres	Martha Huby; Peru	25.5 =CR	Érica da Silva; Brazil	25.6	Teresa Venegas; Chile	25.8
80 metres hurdles	Wanda dos Santos; Brazil	11.5	Maria José de Lima; Brazil	12.1	Lucía Fantino; Argentina	12.2
4 × 100 metres relay	Brazil; Wanda dos Santos; Érica da Silva; Melânia Luz; Marlene Porto	48.7	Chile; Katte Harzenetter; Nancy Correa; Teresa Venegas; Martha Gatica	50.2	Argentina; Dolores Bonacassi; Miriam Cabanillas; Lucía Fantino; Marta González	50.6
High jump	Renata Friedrichs; Chile	1.55	Deyse de Castro; Brazil	1.50	Cleide Eloy; Brazil	1.50
Long jump	Iris dos Santos; Brazil	5.54	Wanda dos Santos; Brazil	5.48	Marta González; Argentina	5.32
Shot put	Isabel Avellán; Argentina	12.69 CR	Eliana Bahamondes; Chile	12.16	Vera Trezoitko; Brazil	12.06
Discus throw	Isabel Avellán; Argentina	44.57 CR	Pradelia Delgado; Chile	39.68	Ingeborg Mello; Argentina	39.05
Javelin throw	Marlene Ahrens; Chile	43.85	Adriana Silva; Chile	39.75	Magdalena García; Argentina	39.10

== Medal table ==
Rank	Nation	Gold	Silver	Bronze	Total
1	Brazil (BRA)	13	15	10	38
2	Chile (CHI)	8	5	8	21
3	Argentina (ARG)	7	8	16	31
4	Peru (PER)	2	1	1	4
5	Uruguay (URU)	1	1	0	2
6	Colombia (COL)	0	1	0	1
Totals (6 entries)		31	31	35	97
