= Ramón Sandoval =

Chilean middle-distance runner

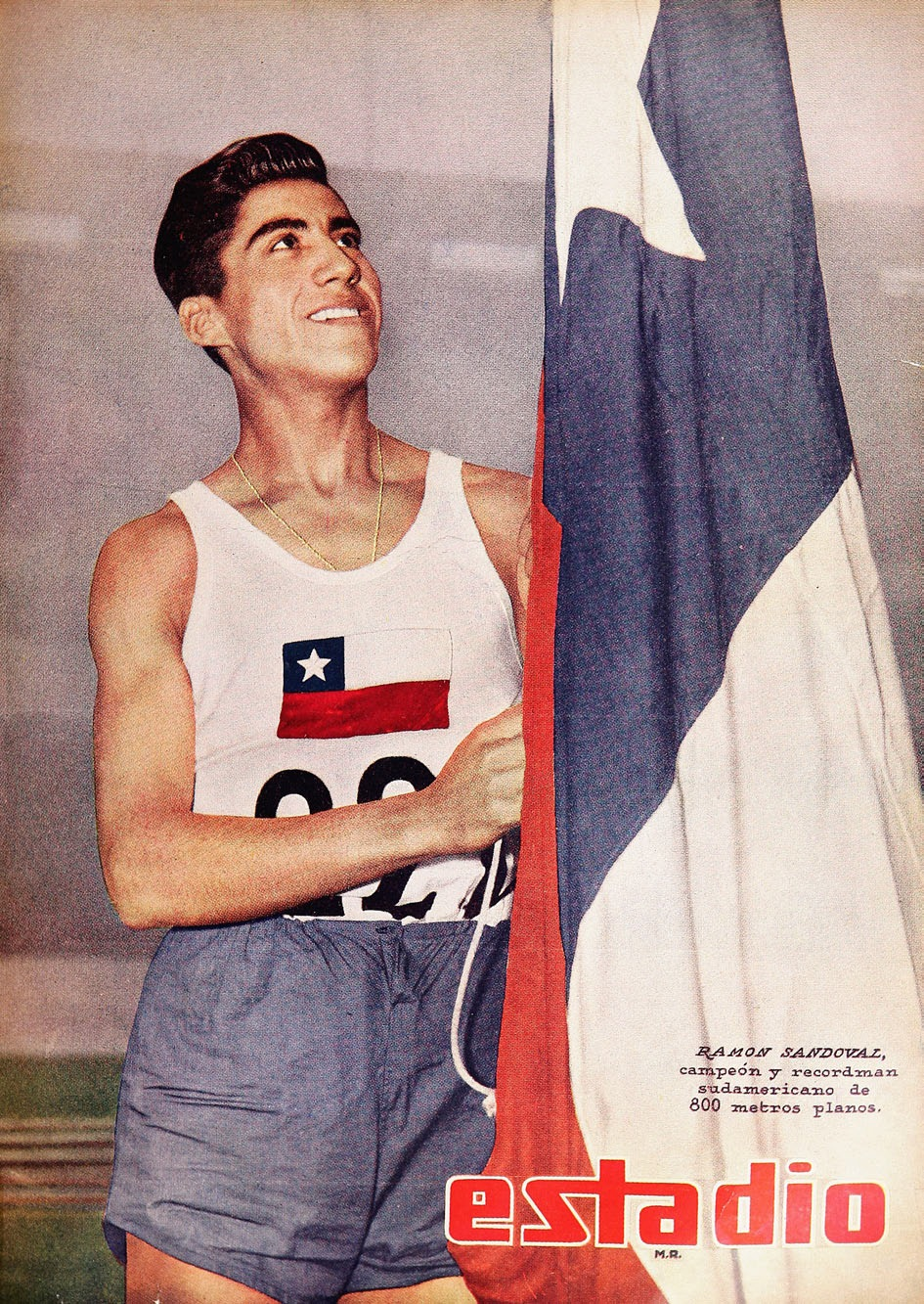

Personal information
- Full name: Ramón Jesús Sandoval Rojas
- Nationality: Chilean
- Born: 23 September 1931 (age 95)
- Height: 1.74 m (5 ft 9 in)
- Weight: 67 kg (148 lb)

Sport
- Sport: Middle-distance running
- Event: 800 metres
Medal record
Men's Athletics
Representing Chile
Ibero-American Games
| Gold medal – first place | 1960 Santiago | 800 m |
| Gold medal – first place | 1960 Santiago | 1500 m |

Ramón Jesús Sandoval Mendoza (Note: In this Spanish name, the first or paternal surname is Sandoval and the second or maternal family name is Mendoza.) (born 23 September 1931) is a Chilean middle-distance runner. He competed in the men's 800 metres at the 1956 Summer Olympics.

== International competitions ==
| Year | Competition | Venue | Position | Event | Notes |
Representing Chile
| 1951 | Pan American Games | Buenos Aires, Argentina | 11th (sf) | 800 m | NT |
| 1952 | South American Championships | Buenos Aires, Argentina | 6th | 400 m | 50.5 |
| 1952 | South American Championships | Buenos Aires, Argentina | 3rd | 4 × 400 m relay | 3:18.1 |
| 1953 | South American Championships (unofficial) | Santiago, Chile | 3rd | 400 m | 49.1 |
| 1953 | South American Championships (unofficial) | Santiago, Chile | 1st | 800 m | 1:52.3 |
| 1953 | South American Championships (unofficial) | Santiago, Chile | 2nd | 4 × 400 m relay | 3:17.1 |
| 1954 | South American Championships | São Paulo, Brazil | 3rd | 400 m | 49.5 |
| 1954 | South American Championships | São Paulo, Brazil | 1st | 800 m | 1:50.9 |
| 1954 | South American Championships | São Paulo, Brazil | 2nd | 4 × 400 m relay | 3:16.9 |
| 1955 | Pan American Games | Mexico City, Mexico | 3rd | 800 m | 1:52.52 |
| 1955 | Pan American Games | Mexico City, Mexico | 4th | 1500 m | 3:51.9 |
| 1956 | South American Championships | Santiago, Chile | 1st | 800 m | 1:49.0 |
| 1956 | South American Championships | Santiago, Chile | 1st | 1500 m | 3:48.4 |
| 1956 | South American Championships | Santiago, Chile | 4th | 4 × 400 m relay | 3:17.3 |
| 1956 | Olympic Games | Melbourne, Australia | 10th (h) | 800 m | 1:51.9 |
| 1956 | Olympic Games | Melbourne, Australia | 30th (h) | 1500 m | 3:58.1 |
| 1957 | South American Championships (unofficial) | Montevideo, Uruguay | 1st | 800 m | 1:50.4 |
| 1957 | South American Championships (unofficial) | Montevideo, Uruguay | 1st | 1500 m | 3:48.4 |
| 1957 | South American Championships (unofficial) | Montevideo, Uruguay | 2nd | 4 × 400 m relay | 3:18.9 |
| 1958 | South American Championships | Montevideo, Uruguay | 1st | 800 m | 1:49.6 |
| 1958 | South American Championships | Montevideo, Uruguay | 1st | 1500 m | 3:47.5 |
| 1959 | South American Championships (unofficial) | São Paulo, Brazil | 1st | 800 m | 1:54.1 |
| 1959 | South American Championships (unofficial) | São Paulo, Brazil | 1st | 1500 m | 3:57.8 |
| 1959 | Pan American Games | Chicago, United States | 13th (sf) | 800 m | 1:55.0 |
| 1959 | Pan American Games | Chicago, United States | 4th | 1500 m | 3:51.9 |
| 1960 | Ibero-American Games | Santiago, Chile | 1st | 800 m | 1:50.4 |
| 1960 | Ibero-American Games | Santiago, Chile | 1st | 1500 m | 3:52.4 |
| 1960 | Ibero-American Games | Santiago, Chile | 4th | 4 × 400 m relay | 3:18.4 |
| 1961 | South American Championships | Cali, Colombia | 1st | 800 m | 1:51.2 |
| 1961 | South American Championships | Cali, Colombia | 1st | 1500 m | 3:51.2 |
| 1961 | South American Championships | Cali, Colombia | 5th | 4 × 400 m relay | 3:23.8 |

== Personal bests ==
- 800 metres – 1:49.0h (1956)
- 1500 metres – 3:47.5h (1958)
