= Humberto Cabrera =

Cuban sport shooter

Personal information
- Born: 25 March 1954 (age 72)

Sport
- Sport: Sports shooting

Humberto Cabrera (born 25 March 1954) is a Cuban former sports shooter. He competed in the 50 metre rifle, prone event at the 1972 Summer Olympics.
