= 1956 South American Championships in Athletics =

- Dates: 14–22 April
- Host city: Santiago, Chile
- Venue: Estadio Nacional
- Events: 31
- Participation: 7 nations

The 1956 South American Championships in Athletics were held in the Chilean capital, Santiago, between 14 and 22 April.

== Medal summary ==
=== Men's events ===
Event	Gold		Silver		Bronze	
100 metres	Paulo da Fonseca; Brazil	10.6	Gerardo Bönnhoff; Argentina	10.7	João Pires Sobrinho; Brazil	10.7
200 metres	João Pires Sobrinho; Brazil	21.5	Jaime Aparicio; Colombia	21.7	Gerardo Bönnhoff; Argentina	21.8
400 metres	Jaime Aparicio; Colombia	47.7 CR	Zados Guardiola; Colombia	48.2	Argemiro Roque; Brazil	49.0
800 metres	Ramón Sandoval; Chile	1:49.0 AR	Eduardo Balducci; Argentina	1:51.5	Argemiro Roque; Brazil	1:52.4
1500 metres	Ramón Sandoval; Chile	3:48.4 AR	Eduardo Balducci; Argentina	3:53.4	Waldo Sandoval; Chile	3:54.5
5000 metres	Osvaldo Suárez; Argentina	14:30.8 CR	Jaime Correa; Chile	14:47.8	Walter Lemos; Argentina	14:51.7
10,000 metres	Osvaldo Suárez; Argentina	30:12.2 CR	Walter Lemos; Argentina	30:27.4	Alfredo de Oliveira; Brazil	31:41.0
Half marathon	Osvaldo Suárez; Argentina	1:08:54 CR	Walter Lemos; Argentina	1:09:00	Juan Silva; Chile	1:10:31
110 metres hurdles	Ijoel da Silva; Brazil	14.7	Estanislao Kocourek; Argentina	14.9	Francisco Bergonzoni; Brazil	15.1
400 metres hurdles	Jaime Aparicio; Colombia	52.0 CR	Zados Guardiola; Colombia	53.1	Anubes da Silva; Brazil	54.2
3000 metres steeplechase	Santiago Novas; Chile	9:09.0 AR	Sebastião Mendes; Brazil	9:17.4	Guillermo Solá; Chile	9:25.8
4 × 100 metres relay	Brazil; João Pires Sobrinho; Jorge de Barros; Paulo da Fonseca; Anubes da Silva	41.4	Argentina; Gerardo Bönnhoff; Luis Vienna; Roberto Ferrairo; Juan Carlos Acosta	41.5	Colombia; Gilberto Truque; Constantino Fascie; Antonio Vanegas; Aristipo Lerma	42.6
4 × 400 metres relay	Colombia; Jaime Aparicio; Zados Guardiola; Carlos Sierra; Antonio Vanegas	3:14.6 AR	Brazil; Argemiro Roque; Mário do Nascimento; Anubes da Silva; Armando da Silva	3:16.1	Argentina; Rodolfo Beltrán; Juan Carlos Acosta; Gerardo Bönnhoff; Eduardo Balducci	3:16.8
High jump	Oscar Bártoli; Argentina	1.93	Ernesto Lagos; Chile	1.90	Alberto Bacan; Brazil; Juan Ruiz; Chile	1.85
Pole vault	José Luis Infante; Chile	3.90	Gonzalo Rojas; Chile	3.90	Fausto de Souza; Brazil	3.90
Long jump	Fermín Donazar; Uruguay	7.23	Ary de Sá; Brazil	7.14	Luís Akuta; Brazil	7.10
Triple jump	Jorgely Figueira; Brazil	15.14	Luis Huarcaya; Peru	14.59	Carlos Vera; Chile	14.63
Shot put	Alcides Dambrós; Brazil	14.97	Rubén Scaraffia; Argentina	14.72	Günther Kruse; Argentina	13.97
Discus throw	Günther Kruse; Argentina	48.57 CR	Hernán Haddad; Chile	47.24	Pedro Ucke; Argentina	46.56
Hammer throw	Alejandro Díaz; Chile	52.88	Edmundo Zúñiga; Chile	51.71	Elvio Porta; Argentina	51.55
Javelin throw	Ricardo Héber; Argentina	64.45	Néstor Matteucci; Argentina	61.51	Carlos Monge; Peru	59.20
Decathlon	Héctor Menacho; Peru	5670	Leonardo Kittsteiner; Chile	5499	Aldo Ribeiro; Brazil	5401

=== Women's events ===
Event	Gold		Silver		Bronze	
100 metres	Gladys Erbetta; Argentina	12.2 =CR	Beatriz Kretschmer; Chile	12.4	Eliana Gaete; Chile	12.4
200 metres	Beatriz Kretschmer; Chile	25.5	Gladys Erbetta; Argentina	25.8	Martha Huby; Peru	26.1
80 metres hurdles	Wanda dos Santos; Brazil	11.5	Eliana Gaete; Chile	11.6	Ada Brener; Argentina	11.9
4 × 100 metres relay	Argentina; Gladys Erbetta; Lilian Buglia; Edith Berg; Olga Bianchi	48.6	Chile; Marlene Hyslop; Eliana Gaete; Carmen Venegas; Patricia Rodoni	49.3	Brazil; Wanda dos Santos; María José de Lima; Marlene Porto; Hannelore Poetscher	49.4
High jump	Nelly Gómez; Chile	1.50	Elizabeth Müller; Brazil	1.50	María Cañas; Chile; Cleide Eloy; Brazil	1.50
Long jump	Gladys Erbetta; Argentina	5.88 AR	Ada Brener; Argentina	5.41	Olga Bianchi; Argentina	5.39
Shot put	Eliana Bahamondes; Chile	11.95 CR	Pradelia Delgado; Chile	11.84	Elizabeth Müller; Brazil	11.31
Discus throw	Isabel Avellán; Argentina	44.08 CR	Rosa Riveros; Chile	38.22	Ingeborg Mello; Argentina	38.08
Javelin throw	Marlene Ahrens; Chile	48.73 AR	Carmen Venegas; Chile	40.70	Adriana Silva; Chile	38.91

== Medal table ==
Rank	Nation	Gold	Silver	Bronze	Total
1	Argentina (ARG)	10	11	9	30
2	Chile (CHI)	9	12	8	29
3	Brazil (BRA)	7	4	13	24
4	Colombia (COL)	3	3	1	7
5	Peru (PER)	1	1	2	4
6	Uruguay (URU)	1	0	0	1
Totals (6 entries)		31	31	33	95

== Team scores ==
=== Combined ===
Rank	Country	Points
1	Brazil	282
2	Argentina	269.5
3	Chile	264.5
4	Colombia	71
5	Peru	55
6	Uruguay	22
7	Ecuador	1

=== Men ===
Rank	Country	Points
1	Brazil	182.5
2	Argentina	174
3	Chile	155.5
4	Colombia	69
5	Peru	40
6	Uruguay	22
7	Ecuador	1

=== Women ===
Rank	Country	Points
1	Chile	109
2	Argentina	85.5
3	Brazil	39.5
4	Peru	15
5	Colombia	2
6	Uruguay	0
