= Brazil at the 1951 Pan American Games =

- IOC code: BRA
- NOC: Brazilian Olympic Committee
- Website: www.cob.org.br

in Buenos Aires February 25 - March 9,1951
- Competitors: 179 in 18 sports
- Medals Ranked 5th: Gold 5 Silver 15 Bronze 12 Total 32

Pan American Games appearances (overview)
- 1951; 1955; 1959; 1963; 1967; 1971; 1975; 1979; 1983; 1987; 1991; 1995; 1999; 2003; 2007; 2011; 2015; 2019; 2023; 2027

Brazil competed at the inaugural edition of the 1951 Pan American Games held in Buenos Aires, Argentina from February 25 to March 9, 1951.

== Medals ==
Medal	Name(s)	Sport	Event	Date	Ref
Bronze	Adilton Luz	Athletics	Men's high jump	27 February 1951	
Silver	Wilson Carneiro	Athletics	Men's 400m hurdles	28 February 1951	
Bronze	Sinibaldo Gerbasi	Athletics	Men's pole vault	1 March 1951	
Gold	Adhemar Ferreira da Silva	Athletics	Men's triple jump	2 March 1951	
Silver	Hélio da Silva	Athletics	Men's triple jump	2 March 1951	
Bronze	Nadim Marreis	Athletics	Men's shot put	2 March 1951	
Silver	Antenor da Silva	Wrestling	Men's freestyle light heavyweight (-87 kg)	3 March 1951	
Bronze	Elizabeth Müller	Athletics	Women's high jump	3 March 1951	
Silver	Vera Trezoitko	Athletics	Women's shot put	6 March 1951	
Bronze	Wanda dos Santos	Athletics	Women's long jump	6 March 1951	
Silver	Willy Otto Jordan	Swimming	Men's 200m breaststroke	6 March 1951	
Bronze	Men's basketball team: Alberto Marson Alfredo da Motta Almir Nelson de Almeida Ardelin Pinto Hélio Marques Pereira José Luiz Azevedo Mario Jorge Fonseca Hermes Massinet Sorcinelli Paulo Rodrigues Siqueira Sebastião Gimenez Thales Monteiro Zenny de Azevedo	Basketball	Men's tournament	8 March 1951	
Silver	Paulo Sacoman	Boxing	Men's middleweight (-75 kg)	8 March 1951	
Silver	Lucio Grotone	Boxing	Men's light heavyweight (-81 kg)	8 March 1951	
Bronze	Estevão Molnar	Fencing	Men's sabre		
Bronze	Estevão Molnar; Frederico Taveira Serrão; Hugler Matt; Virgílio Damazio de Sá	Fencing	Men's sabre team		
Gold	Eric Tinoco Marques	Modern pentathlon	Men's individual		
Silver	Aloysio Alves Borges; Edgard Manuel Brilhante; Eduardo Lela de Medeiros; Eric Tinoco Marques	Modern pentathlon	Men's team		
Silver	Henrique Fusquini; Walter Karl	Rowing	Men's coxless pair-oared shells		
Silver	Alberto Santos; Alvaro Fonseca; Ivo Ritman; Manoel Amorim	Rowing	Men's coxless four-oared shells		
Silver	Jean Maligo; Geraldo Matoso	Sailing	Snipe class		
Gold	Roberto Bueno; Gastão Pereira Souza	Sailing	Star class		
Silver	Ademar Onéssimo Faller; Adhaury Rocha; Allan Sobocinski; Pedro Simão	Shooting	Men's 25m rapid fire pistol team		
Silver	Antônio Snizeck; Edimar Eichemberg; Guido Albertini; Max Schrappe	Shooting	Men's skeet team		
Bronze	Alberto Pereira Braga; Allan Sobocinski; Antônio Martins Guimarães; Ernani Martins Neves; João Sobocinski	Shooting	Men's military rifle prone team		
Gold	Tetsuo Okamoto	Swimming	Men's 400m freestyle		
Gold	Tetsuo Okamoto	Swimming	Men's 1500m freestyle		
Silver	Aram Boghossian; João Gonçalves Filho; Ricardo Capanema; Tetsuo Okamoto	Swimming	Men's 4 × 200 m freestyle relay		
Bronze	Piedade Coutinho	Swimming	Women's 400m freestyle		
Bronze	Ana Lucia Santa Rita; Idamis Busin; Piedade Coutinho; Talita Rodrigues	Swimming	Women's 4 × 100 m freestyle relay		
Bronze	Helena Stark; Silvia Villari	Tennis	Women's doubles		
Silver	Men's water polo team: Alfonso Zaparoli Armando Caropresco Claudino de Castro Edson Peri Guilherme Schall Isaac Moraes João Havelange Leo Rossi Luiz Antônio dos Santos Milton Busin Nelson Brescia Samuel Schemberg Saverio Gregorut	Water polo	Men's tournament		

Medals by sport
Sport	1st place, gold medalist(s)	2nd place, silver medalist(s)	3rd place, bronze medalist(s)	Total
Swimming	2	2	2	6
Athletics	1	3	5	9
Modern Pentathlon	1	1	0	2
Sailing	1	1	0	2
Shooting	0	2	1	3
Boxing	0	2	0	2
Rowing	0	2	0	2
Waterpolo	0	1	0	1
Wrestling	0	1	0	1
Fencing	0	0	2	2
Basketball	0	0	1	1
Tennis	0	0	1	1
Total	5	15	12	32

== See also ==
- Brazil at the 1952 Summer Olympics
- List of Pan American medalists for Brazil
