= Enrique Baldwin =

Peruvian sports shooter (1909–1988)

Personal information
- Full name: Enrique Baldwin Ponte
- Born: 19 June 1909 Callao, Peru
- Died: 1988 (aged 78–79)
Medal record
Men's shooting
Representing Peru
Pan American Games
Silver medal – second place	1951 Buenos Aires	rifle prone 50 & 100 m, team
Bronze medal – third place	1951 Buenos Aires	rifle 3-positions 50 m, team
Bolivarian Games
Gold medal – first place	1951 Caracas	rifle prone 50 & 100 m, team
Silver medal – second place	1947–48 Lima	rifle 3-positions 50 m

Enrique Baldwin Ponte (Note: In this Spanish name, the first or paternal surname is Baldwin and the second or maternal family name is Ponte.) (19 June 1909 – 1988) was a Peruvian sports shooter. He competed in the 300 m rifle event at the 1948 Summer Olympics.

His brother is Guillermo Baldwin, his niece is Gladys Baldwin, and his grandniece is Gladys de Seminario.
