= Guillermo Baldwin =

Peruvian sports shooter (1910–1986)

Personal information
- Full name: Guillermo Baldwin Ponte
- Born: 17 July 1910 Callao, Peru
- Died: 3 December 1986 (aged 76) Lima, Peru
Medal record
Men's shooting
Representing Peru
Pan American Games
Silver medal – second place	1951 Buenos Aires	rifle prone 50 & 100 m, team
Silver medal – second place	1951 Buenos Aires	rifle standing team 300 m
Silver medal – second place	1951 Buenos Aires	rifle 3-positions 300 m, team
Bronze medal – third place	1951 Buenos Aires	rifle 3-positions 50 m, team
Silver medal – second place	1959 Chicago	rifle prone 50 & 100 m, team
Bronze medal – third place	1959 Chicago	rifle 3-positions 300 m, team
Bolivarian Games
Gold medal – first place	1947–48 Lima	rifle 3-positions 300 m

Guillermo Baldwin Ponte (Note: In this Spanish name, the first or paternal surname is Baldwin and the second or maternal family name is Ponte.) (17 July 1910 – 3 December 1986) was a Peruvian sports shooter. He competed in the 300 metre rifle event at the 1956 Summer Olympics.

His brother is Enrique Baldwin, his daughter is Gladys Baldwin, and his granddaughter is Gladys de Seminario.
