= João Gonçalves Filho =

Brazilian water polo player

Personal information
- Born: 7 December 1934 Rio Claro, São Paulo, Brazil
- Died: 27 June 2010 (aged 75) São Paulo, São Paulo, Brazil
- Height: 1.75 m (5 ft 9 in)
- Weight: 81 kg (179 lb)

Sport
- Sport: Swimming
- Strokes: Backstroke, Freestyle
Medal record
Men's swimming
Representing Brazil
Pan American Games
Silver medal – second place	1951 Buenos Aires	4 x 200 m freestyle
Men's Water polo
Representing Brazil
Pan American Games
Gold medal – first place	1963 São Paulo	Water polo
Silver medal – second place	1967 Winnipeg	Water polo
Bronze medal – third place	1959 Chicago	Water polo

João Gonçalves Filho (7 December 1934 – 27 June 2010) was a Brazilian sportsman. He competed in five Olympic Games in both swimming and water polo. Born in Rio Claro, São Paulo, he represented Brazil in swimming at the 1952 and 1956 Olympics and in water polo at the 1960, 1964, and 1968 Olympics.

Gonçalves swam for Fluminense Football Club, where he met future wife Wilma, part of the club's diving team. He studied Physical Education in the military academy alongside future Olympic track and field champion Adhemar da Silva, becoming a judo enthusiast and black belt.

At the inaugural Pan American Games in 1951, in Buenos Aires, Argentina, he won a silver medal in the 4×200-metre freestyle, along with Aram Boghossian, Ricardo Capanema, and Tetsuo Okamoto. At the 1952 Summer Olympics in Helsinki, he swam the 100-metre backstroke and the 4×200-metre freestyle, not reaching the final.

At the 1955 Pan American Games in Mexico City, he finished 4th in the 100-metre backstroke, and 4th in the 4 × 100-metre medley. The following year, at the 1956 Summer Olympics in Melbourne, he swam the 100-metre backstroke, not reaching the final.

Afterwards, Gonçalves moved to Esporte Clube Pinheiros in São Paulo, where he practiced water polo and attended law school at Mackenzie Presbyterian University. For extra earnings, he also became a trucker. He won the bronze medal at the 1959 Pan American Games in Chicago, a gold medal at the 1963 Pan American Games in São Paulo, and a silver at the 1967 Pan American Games in Winnipeg.

At Rome 1960, Tokyo 1964 and Mexico City 1968, he finished 13th with the Brazilian Water Polo team. He was given the honour to carry the national flag of Brazil at the opening ceremony of the 1968 Summer Olympics, becoming the tenth water polo player to be a flag bearer at the opening and closing ceremonies of the Olympics. Retired from practicing sports, Gonçalves Filho became a judo coach, first for Esporte Clube Pinheiros and eventually the Brazilian national team starting in 1978. He advocated weightlifting and extensive training to ensure the Brazilian got physiques matching the Eastern European ones. Gonçalves attended the Barcelona 1992 and Atlanta 1996, seeing Pinheiros judoka Aurélio Miguel win a bronze medal in the latter. Other three Brazilian medallists in Judo, Douglas Vieira, Tiago Camilo, and Leandro Guilheiro, also trained under Gonçalves. He died in June 2010, of liver failure during a femur surgery. His grandson, Gustavo Guimarães, follows his legacy and is part of the current Brazilian water polo team.

== See also ==
- Brazil men's Olympic water polo team records and statistics
- Dual sport and multi-sport Olympians
