= Shooting at the 1951 Pan American Games =

At the 1951 Pan American Games a men's sport shooting competition was held. Events were held in Buenos Aires, Argentina at the Tiro Federal Argentino - Buenos Aires between 25 February and 3 March. There were several disciplines, including individual and team events.

== Medal summary ==
Event	Gold		Silver		Bronze	
25 metre rapid fire pistol	Huelet Benner; United States	578 pts	Enrique Díaz; Argentina	566 pts	Oscar Cervo; Argentina	564 pts
50 metre pistol	Edwin Vásquez Cam; Peru	549 pts	Huelet Benner; United States	547 pts	Rafael Bermejo; Mexico	543 pts
50 metre rifle three positions	Arthur Jackson; United States	1125 pts	Arthur Cook; United States	1119 pts	Julio Silva; Argentina	1118 pts
50 metre rifle prone	Arthur Jackson; United States	591 pts	Pedro Postigo; Argentina	590 pts	Augusto Cires; Ecuador	589 pts
Skeet	Pablo Grossi; Argentina	289 pts	Fulvio Rocchi; Argentina	287 pts	Aroldo Pienovi; Argentina	285 pts
Military rifle three positions	Pablo Cagnasso; Argentina	522 pts	Antonio Ando; Argentina		Ramón Hagen; Argentina	
Military rifle standing	Pablo Cagnasso; Argentina	419 pts	Antonio Ando; Argentina	412 pts	Ramón Hagen; Argentina	409 pts
50 metre high power rifle three positions	Pablo Cagnasso; Argentina	1090 pts	Arthur Jackson; United States	1088 pts	David Schiaffino; Argentina	1073 pts
25 metre rapid fire pistol team	Dionisio Fernández; Enrique Díaz; Ernesto Guillón; Oscar Cervo; Argentina	2247 pts	Ademar Onéssimo Faller; Adhaury da Costa Rocha; Allan Sobocinski; Pedro Simão; Brazil	2166 pts	Ernesto Montemayor; José Reyes; Manuel Larrañaga; Miguel Lambarri; Mexico	2114 pts
25 metre pistol team	José Reyes; Miguel Lambarri; Pedro Avilés; Rafael Bermejo; Raúl Ibarra; Mexico	2683 pts	Alberto Martijena; Ángel Manelli; Antonio Cannavo; Oscar Bidegain; Pablo Cagnasso; Argentina	2633 pts	César Injoque; Edwin Vásquez Cam; Pedro Puente; Vicente Portaro; Wenceslao Salgado; Peru	2632 pts
50 metre rifle three positions team	David Schiaffino; Fernando Potente; Julio Silva; Oscar Olmos; Rubén Longhi; Argentina	5540 pts	Gustavo Rojas; Juan Bizama; Julio Arriagada; Miguel Niño; Vicente Herrera; Chile	5456 pts	Enrique Baldwin; Guillermo Baldwin; Luis Albornoz; Luis Mantilla; Rubén Váldez; Peru	5435 pts
Skeet team	Aroldo Pienovi; Fulvio Rocchi; Geronimo Cosoli; Pablo Grossi; Argentina	756 pts	Antônio Snizeck; Edimar Eichemberg; Guido Albertini; Max Schrappe; Brazil	747 pts		
50 metre high power rifle three positions team	David Schiaffino; Juan Martino; Julio Silva; Pablo Cagnasso; Pablo Pedotti; Argentina	5355 pts	Antonio Mendoza; Joel Gálvez; José G. de la Torre; José Nosari; Sebastián de la Cerda; Mexico	4885 pts	Gregorio Moya; José Landín; Juan Chávez; Rafael Rodríguez; Rufino Gutiérrez; Cuba	4399 pts
Military rifle three positions team	Argentina	2548 pts	Peru	2410 pts	Chile	2408 pts
Military rifle prone team	Cirillo Nassiff; Delmo Remy; Pedro Postigo; Roberto Salvagno; Rúben Longhi; Argentina	2918 pts	Elías Benavides; Enrique Baldwin; Guillermo Baldwin; Julio Poggi; Rubén Váldez; Peru	2896 pts	Allan Sobocinski; Alberto Pereira Braga; Antônio Martins Guimarães; Ernani Martins Neves; João Sobocinski; Brazil	2895 pts
Military rifle standing team	Argentina	1634 pts	Peru	1569 pts	Chile	1544 pts

== Medal table ==
* Host nation (Argentina)

Rank	Nation	Gold	Silver	Bronze	Total
1	Argentina*	11	6	6	23
2	United States	3	3	0	6
3	Peru	1	3	2	6
4	Mexico	1	1	2	4
5	Brazil	0	2	1	3
6	Chile	0	1	2	3
7	Cuba	0	0	1	1
7	Ecuador	0	0	1	1
Totals (8 entries)		16	16	15	47
