= Sharon Geary =

American swimmer

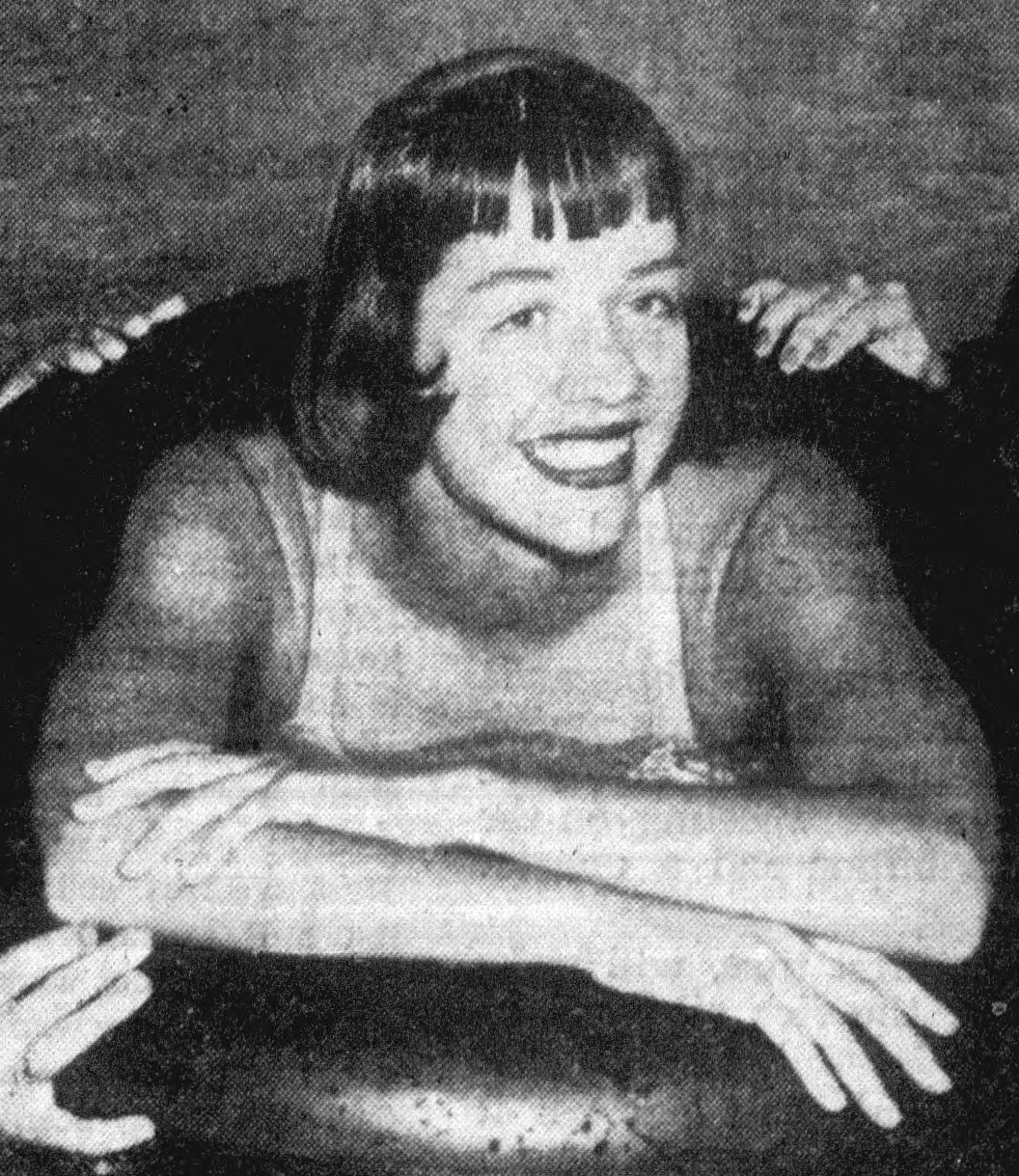
- Geary, circa 1950

Personal information
- Nationality: USA
- Born: April 26, 1933 Los Angeles, California
- Died: September 28, 2018 (aged 85) Los Angeles, California
- Education: Stanford University (1954)
- Occupations: Executive, Land Holding Co.
- Height: 5 ft 8 in (173 cm)
- Spouses: Merritt Adamson, Jr., Geoffry Gee
- Children: 4

Sport
- Sport: Swimming
- Strokes: Freestyle; Backstroke
- Club: Los Angeles Athletic Club (LAAC)
- Coach: Thelma Payne, (LAAC)
Medal record
Representing the United States
Pan American Games
Gold medal – first place	1951 Buenos Aires	100 m freestyle
Gold medal – first place	1951 Buenos Aires	4x100 m freestyle
Gold medal – first place	1951 Buenos Aires	3x100 m medley

Sharon Geary also known by her married names Sharon Adamson and Sharon Gee was an American swimmer, who won three gold medals at the 1951 Pan American Games, and later served as the President of the Mariposa Land Company.

Sharon Geary was born April 26, 1933 in Los Angeles, to father Leslie Edward Geary, a designer of naval vessels, and mother Freda Emma Weiffenbach Geary. She graduated Polytechnic High School in greater Los Angeles around the Spring of 1950, and swam for the Los Angeles Athletic Club where she may have been coached by Thelma Payne a former Olympic swimmer, though her coaches at the club are not well documented.

== 1951 PanAm Games ==
She competed at the 1951 Pan American Games in Buenos Aires, where she received a gold medal in the 100 meter freestyle with a time of 1:08.4, finishing ahead of Jacqueline Lavine and Ana María Schultz. She also participated on the American teams that received gold medals in the 4x100 freestyle relay, and the 3x100m medley relay at the 1951 Pan American Games.

== 1952 Helsinki Olympics ==
Geary won a berth as an alternate for the women's 4x100-meter freestyle relay at the 1952 Olympics in Helsinki. The American women's 4x100-meter relay team later won the bronze medal in a close finish with a time of 4:30.1, but Sharon did not compete. The women's team from Hungary won the gold, and the team from the Netherlands won the silver with a time of 4:29.0.

Geary attended Stanford University graduating in March, 1954, and became a member of the Stanford Athletic Hall of Fame, though Stanford had no women's swim team during her attendance.

=== Marriages ===
Having met through yachting, on April 30, 1954, Geary married Merritt Huntley Adamson, Jr. at the Church of All Saints By the Sea in Montecito, California. The two had four children, before Adamson's death in 1986. After Adamson's death, she married Geoffry Gee, whom she had also met through her boating avocation.

=== Careers and avocations ===
After the death of her first husband, she served with the Mariposa Land Company in the office of President, which she operated with two of her sons. She was a skilled competition sailor, coming in second in her racing class at the San Pedro, California to Honolulu TransPacific race. She helped found the California Yacht Club's youth sailing program, and was one of America's first women to pilot gliders.

Geary died September 28, 2018 at the age of 85 in Los Angeles. She was cremated and her ashes were scattered off the beach in Santa Monica.
