= Bjarne Lingås =

Norwegian boxer (1933–2011)

Bjarne Lingås (7 January 1933 – 19 November 2011) was a Norwegian boxer. He became the Norwegian Champion six times in heavyweight and light heavyweight. He became the Nordic Champion in 1955. In 1954 he was on the Europe Team in the Golden Gloves tournament in the United States, and won his two matches. For that he received Morgenbladets Gullmedalje (The Morgenbladets Gold Medal).

In 1951 he defeated the Swedes' Ingemar Johansson. In 1952 Lingås represented Norway in the Light Heavyweight division at the Helsinki Olympic Games, losing to Brazilian Lucio Grotone in the second round.
