= Carlos Alberto Bonacich =

Argentine swimmer

Personal information
- Born: 17 November 1931 (age 94)

Sport
- Sport: Swimming
Medal record
Representing Argentina
Pan American Games
Bronze medal – third place	1951 Buenos Aires	4x200m freestyle relay

Carlos Alberto Bonacich (born 17 November 1931) is an Argentine former swimmer. He competed in the men's 400 metre freestyle at the 1952 Summer Olympics.
