= Oscar Gallardo =

Argentine boxer (born 1929)

Oscar Juan Gallardo
Personal information
- Born: 10 June 1929 Buenos Aires, Argentina

Sport
- Sport: Boxing
Medal record
Men's amateur boxing
Representing Argentina
Pan American Games
Gold medal – first place	1951 Buenos Aires	Lightweight

Oscar Gallardo (born 10 June 1929) is an Argentine boxer. He competed in the men's light welterweight event at the 1952 Summer Olympics.
