= Athletics at the 1955 Pan American Games – Men's triple jump =

Men's triple jump at the Pan American Games

The men's triple jump event at the 1955 Pan American Games was held at the Estadio Universitario in Mexico City on 16 March.

== Results ==
| Rank | Name | Nationality | #1 | #2 | #3 | #4 | #5 | #6 | Result | Notes |
|---|---|---|---|---|---|---|---|---|---|---|
| 1st place, gold medalist(s) | Adhemar da Silva | Brazil | 14.86 | 16.02 | 16.13 | x | 15.86 | 16.56 | 16.56 | WR |
| 2nd place, silver medalist(s) | Asnoldo Devonish | Venezuela | | | | | | | 16.13 | |
| 3rd place, bronze medalist(s) | Víctor Hernández | Cuba | | | | | | | 15.60 | |
| 4 | Carlos Vera | Chile | | | | | | | 15.30 | |
| 5 | Claudio Cabrejas | Cuba | | | | | | | 15.00 | |
| 6 | Willie Hollie | United States | | | | | | | 14.96 | |
| 7 | Fermín Donazar | Uruguay | | | | | | | 14.34 | |
| 8 | Alberto Lemus | Colombia | | | | | | | 13.98 | |
| 9 | Jack Smyth | Canada | | | | | | | 13.89 | |
| 10 | Jorge Aguirre | Mexico | | | | | | | 13.84 | |
| 11 | Francisco Dávila | Mexico | | | | | | | 13.54 | |
| | Ramón Hospedale | Venezuela | | | | | | | ? | |
| | Álvaro Gutiérrez | Colombia | | | | | | | ? | |
| | Rosslyn Range | United States | | | | | | | DNS | |
| | John Bennett | United States | | | | | | | DNS | |
