= Ernesto Lagos =

Chilean high jumper (born 1931)

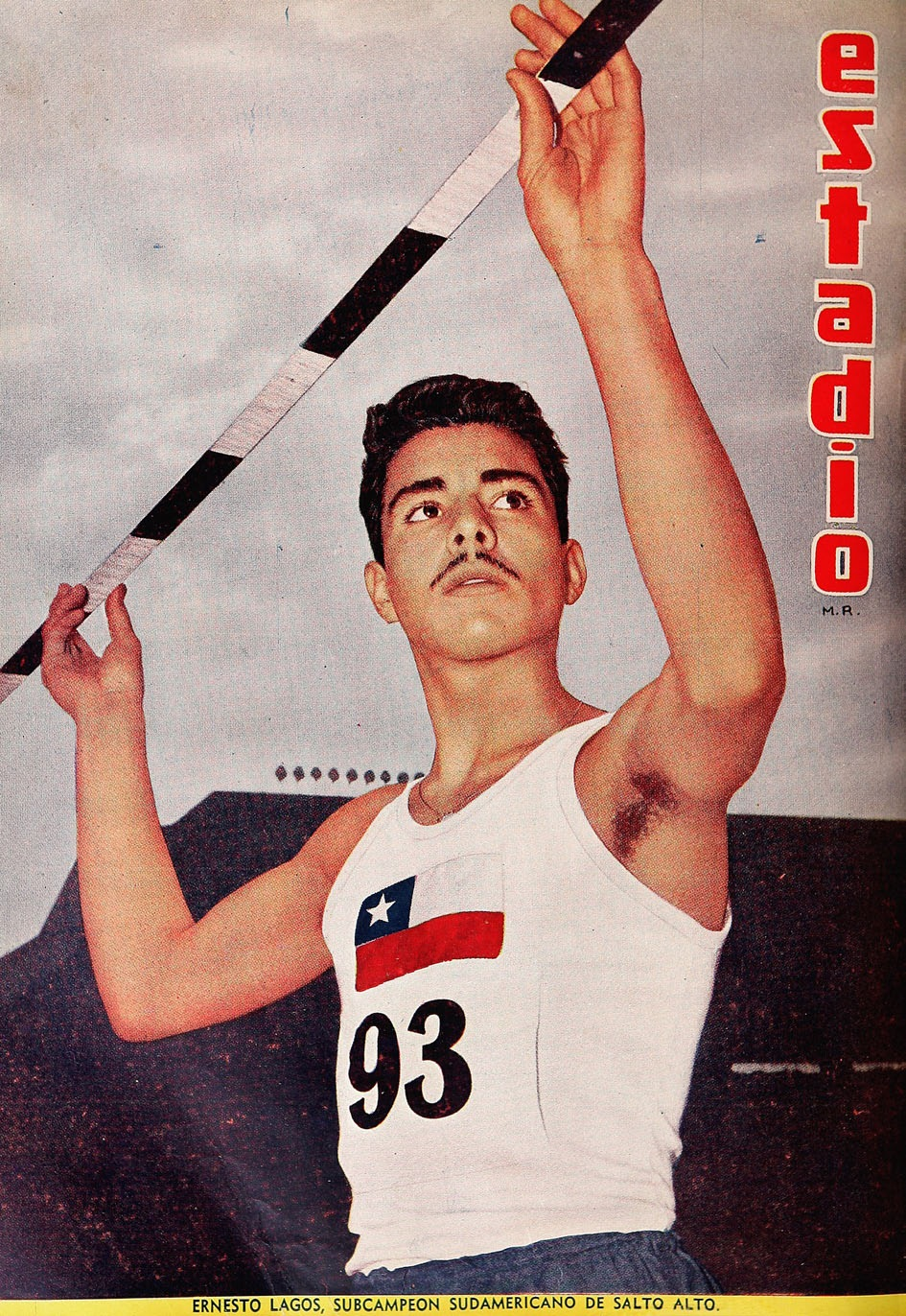

Personal information
- Full name: Ernesto Lagos Salinas
- Nationality: Chilean
- Born: 28 November 1931 Santiago, Chile
- Height: 1.82 m (6 ft 0 in)
- Weight: 68 kg (150 lb)

Sport
- Sport: Athletics
- Event: High jump

Ernesto Lagos Salinas (born 28 November 1931) is a Chilean high jumper. He competed in the men's high jump at the 1951 Pan American Games (fifth place), the 1952 Summer Olympics, and the 1955 Pan American Games (fourth place). At the South American Championships he won silver medals in 1952, 1954 and 1956, and a bronze medal in 1958.

His personal best in the event was 1.96 m set in 1955.

== International competitions ==
Year	Competition	Venue	Position	Notes
Representing Chile
1951	Pan American Games	Buenos Aires, Argentina	4th	1.85 m
1952	South American Championships	Buenos Aires, Argentina	2nd	1.85 m
1952	Olympic Games	Helsinki, Finland	32nd (q)	1.80 m
1953	South American Championships (unofficial)	Santiago, Chile	2nd	1.93 m
1954	South American Championships	São Paulo, Brazil	2nd	1.95 m
1955	Pan American Games	Mexico City, Mexico	4th	1.89 m
1956	South American Championships	Santiago, Chile	2nd	1.90 m
1957	South American Championships (unofficial)	Santiago, Chile	1st	1.93 m
1958	South American Championships	Montevideo, Uruguay	3rd	1.80 m
