= Jorge Aguirre (athlete) =

Mexican athlete (1925–2005)

Personal information
- Full name: Jorge Salvador Aguirre Martín
- Born: 11 February 1925
- Died: 14 July 2005 (aged 80)

Sport
- Sport: Athletics
- Events: Long jump, triple jump

Achievements and titles
- Personal bests: LJ – 7.05 m (1951); TJ – 14.42 m (1951)

Jorge Salvador Aguirre Martín (11 February 1925 – 14 July 2005) was a Mexican athlete. He competed in the men's long jump and men's triple jump at the 1948 Summer Olympics, and placed fifth in the triple jump at the 1951 Pan American Games.

== International competitions ==
Year	Competition	Venue	Position	Event	Notes
Representing Mexico
1948	Olympic Games	London, United Kingdom	20th (q)	Long jump	5.910 m
1948	Olympic Games	London, United Kingdom	26th (q)	Triple jump	?
1951	Pan American Games	Buenos Aires, Argentina	9th	Long jump	6.18 m
1951	Pan American Games	Buenos Aires, Argentina	5th	Triple jump	13.92 m
1954	Central American and Caribbean Games	Mexico City, Mexico	9th	Long jump	6.53 m
1954	Central American and Caribbean Games	Mexico City, Mexico	6th	Triple jump	14.00 m
1954	Central American and Caribbean Games	Mexico City, Mexico	9th	Pentathlon	2122 pts
1955	Pan American Games	Mexico City, Mexico	10th	Long jump	6.41 m
1955	Pan American Games	Mexico City, Mexico	10th	Triple jump	13.84 m

== Personal bests ==
- Long jump – 7.05 metres (1951)
- Triple jump – 14.42 metres (1951)
