= Tonatiuh Gutiérrez =

Mexican swimmer (1929–2000)

Personal information
- Full name: Tonatiuh Gutiérrez Olguin
- Nationality: Mexico
- Born: November 20, 1929
- Died: 2000 (aged 70–71)

Sport
- Sport: Swimming
- Strokes: Freestyle and backstroke
Medal record
Pan American Games
Silver medal – second place	1951 Buenos Aires	1500 m freestyle
Bronze medal – third place	1951 Buenos Aires	400 m freestyle

Tonatiuh Gutiérrez (November 20, 1929 – 2000) was a Mexican swimmer. He competed in the freestyle and the backstroke events.

Gutiérrez twice competed for his native country at the Summer Olympics of 1948 and 1952. He also won two medals (silver and bronze) in the men's freestyle events at the 1951 Pan American Games.

Gutiérrez died in 2000.

== Sources ==
- sports-reference
