= Ricardo Capanema =

Brazilian swimmer (1933–1998)

Personal information
- Full name: Ricardo Esberad Capanema
- Nationality: Brazil
- Born: 19 September 1933 Rio de Janeiro, Brazil
- Died: 10 May 1998 (aged 66)

Sport
- Sport: Swimming
- Strokes: Freestyle
Medal record
Men's swimming
Representing Brazil
Pan American Games
Silver medal – second place	1951 Buenos Aires	4 x 200 m freestyle

Ricardo Esberad Capanema (19 September 1933 – 10 May 1998) was an international freestyle swimmer from Brazil. At the inaugural Pan American Games in 1951, in Buenos Aires, Argentina, he won a silver medal in the 4×200-metre freestyle, along with Aram Boghossian, João Gonçalves Filho, and Tetsuo Okamoto. At the 1952 Summer Olympics in Helsinki, he swam the 400-metre freestyle, not reaching the final.

He won the gold medal at the 1953 Summer International University Sport Week for swimming in 100m backstroke for men at Dortmund in Germany.
