= Nicasio Silverio =

Cuban swimmer (1930–2016)

Personal information
- Full name: Nicasio Juan Silverio Ferrer
- Nationality: Cuba
- Born: December 27, 1930 Havana
- Died: July 25, 2016 (aged 85)

Sport
- Sport: Swimming
- Strokes: Freestyle
Medal record
Pan American Games
Bronze medal – third place	1951 Buenos Aires	100 m freestyle

Nicasio Silverio (December 27, 1930 – July 25, 2016) was a Cuban swimmer. He was born in Havana and competed in the freestyle events. Silverio twice competed for his native country at the Summer Olympics: 1948 and 1952. He won the bronze medal in the men's 100 m freestyle event at the 1951 Pan American Games. He was inducted into the Cuban Hall of Fame for Swimming.
