= Penny Pence =

American swimmer (1929–2025)

Personal information
- Full name: Carol Jane Pence
- Nickname: "Penny"
- National team: United States
- Born: May 11, 1929 Indianapolis, Indiana, U.S.
- Died: November 4, 2025 (aged 96) New Orleans, Louisiana, U.S.

Sport
- Sport: Swimming
- Strokes: Breaststroke
- Club: Lafayette Country Club
Medal record
Representing United States
Pan American Games
Gold medal – first place	1951 Buenos Aires	3x100m medley relay
Bronze medal – third place	1951 Buenos Aires	200m breaststroke

Carol Jane "Penny" Pence Taylor (May 11, 1929 – November 4, 2025), also known by her married name Penny Taylor, was an American competition swimmer who represented the United States at the 1948 Summer Olympics in London. She competed in the preliminary heats of the women's 200-meter breaststroke, and finished with a time of 3:28.1. Pence swam for the Lafayette Swim Club in Indiana and attended Purdue University. In 1951, when Pence was a finalist for the James E. Sullivan Award, she was part of the U.S. Team for the first Pan American Games in 1951, winning a gold medal in the 3×100 meter medley relay and a bronze medal in the 200 meter breaststroke.

After retiring from competition, Pence became a professional swim coach in the St. Louis area for 35 years, with one of her students being five-time Olympic gold medalist Tom Jager. She served in many positions for USA Swimming, being team leader at the 1984 and 1992 Summer Olympics, deck marshal at the 1996 Olympics, and chef de mission in seven FINA World Championships.

Pence later lived in New Orleans, Louisiana, where she died on November 4, 2025, at the age of 96.
