= Alberto Barenghi =

Argentine boxer

Personal information
- Nationality: Argentine
- Born: 2 May 1930
- Died: 18 November 2002 (aged 72)

Sport
- Sport: Boxing
Medal record
Men's amateur boxing
Representing Argentina
Pan American Games
Gold medal – first place	1951 Buenos Aires	Flyweight

Alberto Barenghi (2 May 1930 – 18 November 2002) was an Argentine boxer. He competed in the men's flyweight event at the 1952 Summer Olympics.
