= Athletics at the 1955 Pan American Games – Men's long jump =

Men's long jump at the Pan American Games

The men's long jump event at the 1955 Pan American Games was held at the Estadio Universitario in Mexico City on 14 March.

== Medalists ==
Gold	Silver	Bronze
Rosslyn Range; United States	John Bennett; United States	Ary de Sá; Brazil

== Results ==
=== Qualification ===
Rank	Name	Nationality	Result	Notes
1	John Bennett	United States	7.57	q
2	Ary de Sá	Brazil	7.39	q
3	Aldo Zuccolillo	Paraguay	7.22	q
4	Víctor Hernández	Cuba	7.18	q
5	Carlos Vera	Chile	7.17	q
6	Fermín Donazar	Uruguay	7.16	q
7	Claudio Cabrejas	Cuba	7.13	q
8	Rosslyn Range	United States	7.06	q
9	Alberto Lemus	Colombia	7.03	q
10	Jorge Aguirre	Mexico	6.71	q
11	Francisco Dávila	Mexico	6.57	q
12	Jack Smyth	Canada	6.48	q
13	Sergio Meza	Mexico	6.44	
14	Gilbert McGregor	Jamaica	6.38	
15	Franz Lara	Costa Rica	6.24	
	Adhemar da Silva	Brazil	NM	
	Álvaro Gutiérrez	Colombia	?	

=== Final ===
Rank	Name	Nationality	Result	Notes
1st place, gold medalist(s)	Rosslyn Range	United States	8.03	GR
2nd place, silver medalist(s)	John Bennett	United States	8.02	
3rd place, bronze medalist(s)	Ary de Sá	Brazil	7.84	
4	Carlos Vera	Chile	7.49	
5	Aldo Zuccolillo	Paraguay	7.39	
6	Claudio Cabrejas	Cuba	7.30	
7	Víctor Hernández	Cuba	7.22	
8	Fermín Donazar	Uruguay	7.11	
9	Alberto Lemus	Colombia	7.09	
10	Jorge Aguirre	Mexico	6.41	
11	Jack Smyth	Canada	6.14	
	Francisco Dávila	Mexico	NM	
