= Aram Boghossian =

Brazilian swimmer (born 1929)

Personal information
- Nationality: Brazil
- Born: 19 November 1929 (age 96) Rio de Janeiro, Rio de Janeiro, Brazil

Sport
- Sport: Swimming
- Strokes: Freestyle
Medal record
Men's swimming
Representing Brazil
Pan American Games
Silver medal – second place	1951 Buenos Aires	4 x 200 m freestyle

Aram Boghossian (born 19 November 1929) is a former international freestyle swimmer from Brazil. He was born in Rio de Janeiro. As of 2004 he was still swimming in the Masters' category.

Graduated in engineering, at the age of 60 he returned to swim in the master category, and works managing the family business.

Son of Armenians, he started swimming at the age of six, in Tijuca, where he also played basketball. At the beginning of his career he did not perform well and was advised to leave the sport; but this encouraged him to train even more. In a decision between the swimming and basketball coaches, he was left with swimming only.

At the 1948 Summer Olympics in London, he finished 8th in the 4×200-metre freestyle final, and swam the 100-metre freestyle, finishing 14th at semifinals (he swam the first round and qualified for the semifinals but, due to the distance separating the pool from the accommodation, he waited for the race at the competition venue and ate improperly, having indigestion that took him out of the race). He broke the Brazilian record of the 100-metre freestyle in 1948. His record was broken only in 1956 by Haroldo Lara.

At the inaugural Pan American Games in 1951, in Buenos Aires, Argentina, he won a silver medal in the 4×200-metre freestyle, along with Ricardo Capanema, João Gonçalves Filho, and Tetsuo Okamoto. At the 1952 Summer Olympics in Helsinki, he swam the 100-metre and 4×200-metre freestyle, not reaching the finals.
