= Athletics at the 1951 Pan American Games – Men's long jump =

Men's long jump at the Pan American Games

The men's long jump event at the 1951 Pan American Games was held at the Estadio Monumental in Buenos Aires on 28 February.

== Results ==
Rank	Name	Nationality	Result	Notes
1st place, gold medalist(s)	Gaylord Bryan	United States	7.14	
2nd place, silver medalist(s)	Albino Geist	Argentina	7.09	
3rd place, bronze medalist(s)	Jim Holland	United States	6.95	
4	Adhemar da Silva	Brazil	6.93	
5	Bruno Witthaus	Argentina	6.90	
6	Alberto Eggeling	Chile	6.87	
7	Carlos Vera	Chile	6.47	
8	Alfaro Parra	Colombia	6.36	
9	Jorge Aguirre	Mexico	6.18	
10	Miguel Paredes	Paraguay	6.05	
11	Eugenio Villegas	Colombia	5.99	
12	Francisco Cardus	Paraguay	5.95	
	Enrique Kistenmacher	Argentina	DNS	
	Hélio da Silva	Brazil	DNS	
	Claudio Cabrejas	Cuba	DNS	
	José Zelaya	Paraguay	DNS	
