= Wrestling at the 1951 Pan American Games =

The first Pan American Games in Buenos Aires in 1951 included men's freestyle wrestling competitions in various weight categories. Events were held between 25 February and 3 March.

== Medal summary ==
Event	Gold	Silver	Bronze
– 52 kg	Hugh Peery; United States	Manuel Varela; Argentina	Rodolfo Dávila; Mexico
– 57 kg	Richard LeMeyre; United States	Adolfo Díaz; Argentina	Leonardo Basurto; Mexico
– 62 kg	Omar Blebel; Argentina	Gerald Maurey; United States	Guillermo Palomino; Mexico
– 67 kg	Newton Copple; United States	Osvaldo Blasi; Argentina	José Luis Pérez; Mexico
– 73 kg	Melvin Northrup; United States	Alberto Longarella; Argentina	José López; Cuba
– 79 kg	León Genuth; Argentina	Louis Norton; United States	Eduardo Assam; Mexico
– 87 kg	Ulises Martorella; Argentina	Antenor da Silva; Brazil	Donald McCann; United States
+ 87 kg	Adolfo Ramírez; Argentina	Ralph Schmidt; United States	Luis Friedman; Panama

== Medal table ==
* Host nation (Argentina)

Rank	Nation	Gold	Silver	Bronze	Total
1	Argentina*	4	4	0	8
2	United States	4	3	1	8
3	Brazil	0	1	0	1
4	Mexico	0	0	5	5
5	Cuba	0	0	1	1
5	Panama	0	0	1	1
Totals (6 entries)		8	8	8	24
