= Arthur Cook (sport shooter) =

American sport shooter (1928–2021)

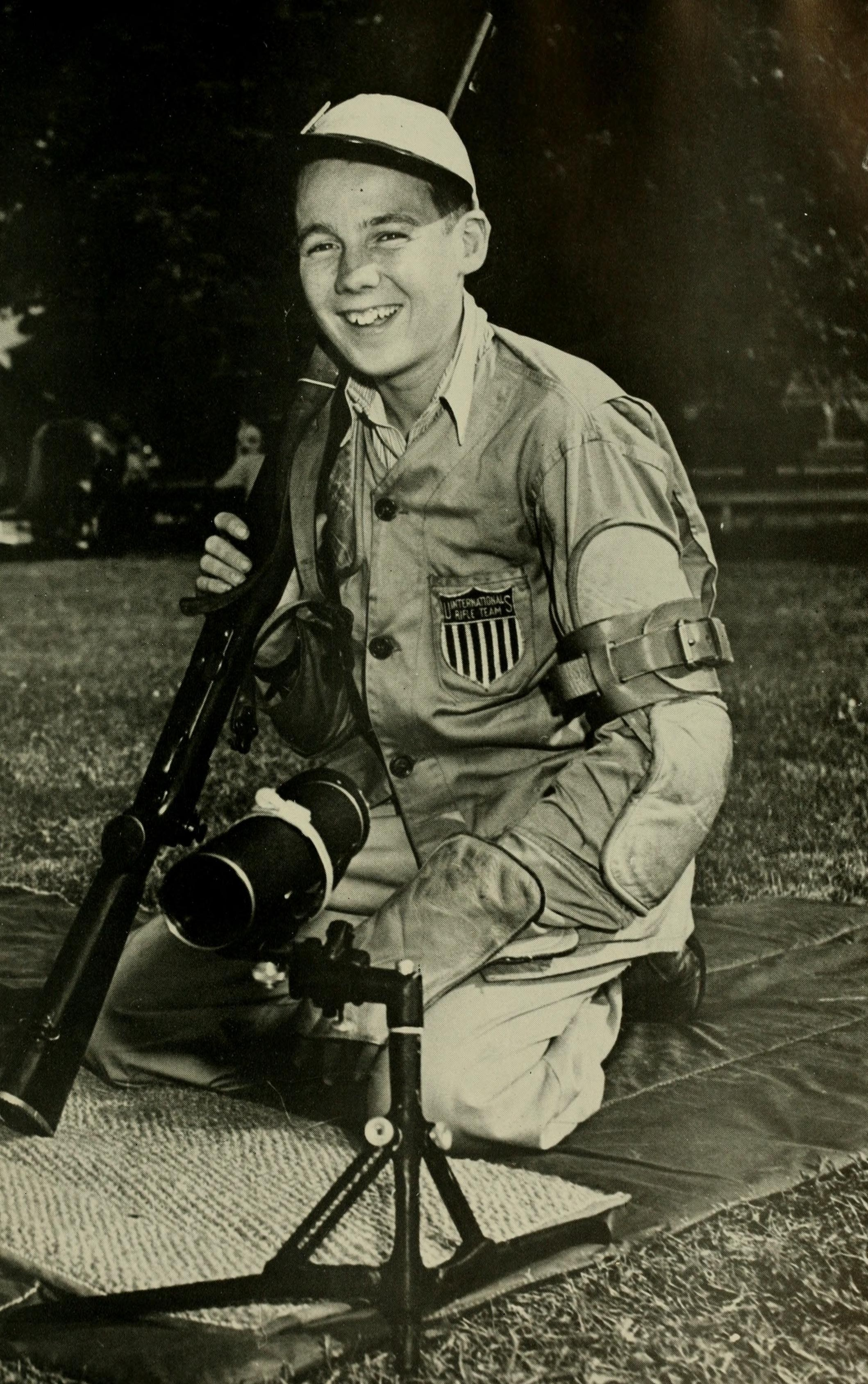
- Cook at an Olympic rifle range near London in 1948

Personal information
- Born: March 19, 1928 Washington, D.C., United States
- Died: February 21, 2021 (aged 92) Rockville, Maryland, United States

Sport
- Sport: Sport shooting
Medal record
Men's shooting
Representing United States
Olympic Games
Gold medal – first place	1948 London	50 m rifle prone
Pan American Games
Gold medal – first place	1959 Chicago	50 m rifle prone
Gold medal – first place	1959 Chicago	50 m team rifle prone
Silver medal – second place	1951 Buenos Aires	50 m rifle 3 positions

Arthur Edwin Cook (March 19, 1928 – February 21, 2021) was an American sport shooter and Olympic champion. He won a gold medal in the 50 metre rifle prone event at the 1948 Summer Olympics in London.

== Biography ==
Cook was born in Washington, D.C. and graduated from McKinley Technology High School. He attended the University of Maryland, College Park, where he was the captain of the rifle team and a member of Sigma Pi fraternity.

Cook began shooting in 1939 while attending a Boy Scout Camp. In 1941, he came in last place in a Boy Scout team shooting match. He stayed with the sport and kept practicing. He won his first victory in 1946 at the National Junior Smallbore Rifle Championship. He then entered the University of Maryland and led them to the National Intercollegiate Team Championships in 1947 and 1949 where they set record scores both years. The team lost a close championship contest to the U.S. Naval Academy in 1948 and took second place. He was named to the All-American Rifle Team all three years. He left school in 1949 to work for a gun supply business.

In 1951, he joined the U.S. Air Force He became a lieutenant and was assigned to the Gunnery Officers School.

Aside from the 1948 Olympic Team, Cook also was a member of the U.S. teams at the 1949 International Shooting Union World Championships, the 1951 Pan American Games, the 1952 ISU World Championships, the 1954 ISU World Championships, and the 1959 Pan American Games. He won two medals at the 1949 World Championships and one medal in 1952. In 1953 and 1957 he won the National Gallery Rifle Championship.

He coached the U.S. Deaf Olympic Team in 1969 and 1993, and helped establish the United States Air Force Marksmanship Training Program. He was inducted into the University of Maryland Athletic Hall of Fame in 1982. He has also been inducted into the USA Shooting Hall of fame. In 1955 he formed his own wholesale supply company, Arthur Cook Supply Corp. Cook died on February 21, 2021.
