= Ary de Sá =

Brazilian long jumper (1928–2020)

Medal record

Men's athletics

Representing Brazil

Pan American Games
Bronze medal – third place	1955 Pan American Games	Long Jump

World Student Games
Gold medal – first place	1955 San Sebastián, Spain	Long Jump

Ary Façanha de Sá (1 April 1928 – 16 August 2020) was a Brazilian long jumper. At the 1952 Summer Olympics, he finished fourth in the long jump. Ary also competed at the 1956 Summer Olympics. He became South American long jump champion in 1952 and won silver medals in 1956 and 1958, along with a bronze medal in 1954. Additionally, he also won a bronze medal at the 1955 Pan American Games and a gold medal at the 1955 World Student Games.

== International competitions ==
Year	Competition	Venue	Position	Event	Notes
Representing Brazil
1952	South American Championships	Buenos Aires, Argentina	16th (h)	100 m	11.1
1952	South American Championships	Buenos Aires, Argentina	9th (sf)	200 m	22.7
1952	South American Championships	Buenos Aires, Argentina	3rd	4 × 100 m relay	42.2 s
1952	South American Championships	Buenos Aires, Argentina	1st	Long jump	7.39 m
1952	Olympic Games	Helsinki, Finland	4th	Long jump	7.23 m
1953	South American Championships (U)	Santiago, Chile	1st	Long jump	7.31 m
1954	South American Championships	São Paulo, Brazil	3rd	Long jump	7.19 m
1955	Pan American Games	Mexico City, Mexico	3rd	Long jump	7.84 m
1955	International University Sports Week	San Sebastián, Spain	1st	Long jump	7.50 m
1956	South American Championships	Santiago, Chile	8th (h)	110 metres hurdles	15.4 s
1956	South American Championships	Santiago, Chile	2nd	Long jump	7.14 m
1956	South American Championships	Santiago, Chile	6th	Decathlon	5110 pts
1956	Olympic Games	Melbourne, Australia	12th (sf)	4 × 100 m relay	43.8 s
1956	Olympic Games	Melbourne, Australia	20th (q)	Long jump	7.00 m
1957	World University Games	Paris, France	7th	Long jump	6.97 m
1958	South American Championships	Montevideo, Uruguay	2nd	Long jump	7.18 m

== Personal bests ==
- 100 metres – 10.6h (1952)
- Long jump – 7.84 m (1955)
