= Athletics at the 1951 Pan American Games – Men's pole vault =

Men's pole vault at the Pan American Games

The men's pole vault event at the 1951 Pan American Games was held at the Estadio Monumental in Buenos Aires on 1 March.

== Results ==
Rank	Name	Nationality	Result	Notes
1st place, gold medalist(s)	Bob Richards	United States	4.50	
2nd place, silver medalist(s)	Jaime Piqueras	Peru	3.90	
3rd place, bronze medalist(s)	Sinibaldo Gerbasi	Brazil	3.90	
4	Raimundo Rodrigues	Brazil	3.70	
5	Jorge Aguilera	Mexico	3.70	
6	Hernán Ortiz	Paraguay	3.50	
7	Luis Barja	Argentina	3.50	
8	Luis Ganoza	Peru	3.50	
9	Carlos Vera	Chile	3.50	
