= Roberto Procel =

Mexican long jumper

Personal information
- Full name: Roberto Procel Lozada
- Nationality: Mexican
- Born: 20 August 1939 (age 86) Mexico City, Mexico
- Height: 1.80 m (5 ft 11 in)
- Weight: 76 kg (168 lb)

Sport
- Sport: Athletics
- Event: Long jump

Roberto Procel Lozada (born August 20, 1939) is a Mexican athlete. He competed in the men's long jump at the 1960 Summer Olympics.

== International competitions ==
Year	Competition	Venue	Position	Event	Notes
Representing Mexico
1959	Central American and Caribbean Games	Caracas, Venezuela	3rd	High jump	1.89 m
1959	Central American and Caribbean Games	Caracas, Venezuela	6th	Long jump	6.54 m
1959	Pan American Games	Chicago, United States	11th	High jump	1.80 m
1959	Pan American Games	Chicago, United States	5th	Long jump	7.05 m
1959	Pan American Games	Chicago, United States	13th	Triple jump	12.82 m
1960	Olympic Games	Rome, Italy	24th (q)	Long jump	7.23 m
1960	Ibero-American Games	Santiago, Chile	14th (q)	High jump	1.75 m
1960	Ibero-American Games	Santiago, Chile	2nd	Long jump	7.16 m
1962	Central American and Caribbean Games	Kingston, Jamaica	7th	High jump	1.83 m
1962	Central American and Caribbean Games	Kingston, Jamaica	4th	Long jump	7.16 m
1963	Pan American Games	São Paulo, Brazil	8th	High jump	1.90 m
1963	Pan American Games	São Paulo, Brazil	4th	Long jump	7.31 m

== Personal bests ==
- Long jump – 7.55 metres (1961)
