= Athletics at the 1959 Pan American Games – Men's triple jump =

Men's triple jump at the Pan American Games

The men's triple jump event at the 1959 Pan American Games was held at the Soldier Field in Chicago on 2 September.

== Results ==
Rank	Name	Nationality	Result	Notes
1st place, gold medalist(s)	Adhemar da Silva	Brazil	15.90	
2nd place, silver medalist(s)	Herman Stokes	United States	15.39	
3rd place, bronze medalist(s)	Bill Sharpe	United States	15.25	
4	Jack Smyth	Canada	15.12	
5	Victor Hernández	Cuba	14.66	
6	Pedro Camacho	Puerto Rico	14.66	
7	Ira Davis	United States	14.54	
8	Mahoney Samuels	British West Indies	14.43	
9	Rumildo Cruz	Puerto Rico	14.43	
10	Ariel Standen	Chile	14.33	
11	Carlos Vera	Chile	13.98	
12	Alberto Betallelus	Peru	13.80	
13	Roberto Procel	Mexico	12.82	
	Julio Llera	Puerto Rico	DNS	
