= Rowing at the 1951 Pan American Games =

At the 1951 Pan American Games a men's rowing competition was held. Events were held in Buenos Aires, Argentina, between 25 February and 3 March.

== Medal summary ==
Event	Gold	Silver	Bronze
Single sculls	Argentina; Roberto Alfieri		
Double sculls	Argentina		
Coxless pair-oared shells	Argentina	Brazil	
Coxed pair-oared shells	Argentina		
Coxless four-oared shells	Argentina	Brazil	
Coxed four-oared shells	Argentina	Chile	Peru
Eight-oared shells	Argentina	Chile	Peru

== Medal table ==
* Host nation (Argentina)

Rank	Nation	Gold	Silver	Bronze	Total
1	Argentina*	7	0	0	7
2	Brazil	0	2	0	2
2	Chile	0	2	0	2
4	Peru	0	0	2	2
Totals (4 entries)		7	4	2	13
