= Haroldo Lara =

Brazilian swimmer (1934–2015)

Personal information
- Full name: Haroldo de Melo Lara
- Nationality: Brazil
- Born: 9 June 1934 Santos, São Paulo, Brazil
- Died: 4 January 2015 (aged 80) Santos, São Paulo, Brazil

Sport
- Sport: Swimming
- Strokes: Freestyle

Haroldo de Melo Lara (9 June 1934 – 4 January 2015) was an Olympic freestyle swimmer from Brazil, who participated in two Summer Olympics for his native country.

At the 1952 Summer Olympics in Helsinki, he swam the 100-metre and the 4×200-metre freestyle, not reaching the finals.

In September 1956, two weekends in a row, in Rio de Janeiro and São Paulo, Haroldo Lara broke and repeated the Brazilian record of 100-metre freestyle, with a time of 57.8 seconds. That was an Aram Boghossian's record since 1948.

At the 1956 Summer Olympics in Melbourne, he swam the 100-metre freestyle, not reaching the finals.

Haroldo Lara was the greatest swimmer sprinter of Brazil in the second half of the 50s, until 1957, when he dropped the swimming, moved to Italy and became an opera singer. He broke 13 Brazilian records, and was a Brazilian and South American record holder from 1952 to 1956. He also carried the torch of the 2007 Pan American Games.

Haroldo Lara died on 6 January 2015, due to complications from a stroke.
