= Athletics at the 1951 Pan American Games – Men's high jump =

Men's high jump at the Pan American Games

The men's high jump event at the 1951 Pan American Games was held at the Estadio Monumental in Buenos Aires on 27 February.

== Results ==
Rank	Name	Nationality	Result	Notes
1st place, gold medalist(s)	Virgil Severns	United States	1.95	
2nd place, silver medalist(s)	Cal Clark	United States	1.90	
3rd place, bronze medalist(s)	Adilton Luz	Brazil	1.90	
4	José da Conceição	Brazil	1.85	
4	Ernesto Lagos	Chile	1.85	
6	Carlos Puebla	Chile	1.80	
7	José Valero	Cuba	1.80	
7	Edgar Andrade	Ecuador	1.80	
9	Teófilo Davis	Venezuela	1.70	
10	Roberto Méndez	Argentina	1.70	
11	Germán Garrido	Venezuela	1.70	
12	Teodoro Gabriawez	Paraguay	1.70	
	Antonio Barrionuevo	Argentina	DNS	
	Carlos Vera	Chile	DNS	
	Juan Puga	Peru	DNS	
	Mirco Cuculiza	Peru	DNS	
	Jaime Piqueras	Peru	DNS	
