= Boxing at the 1951 Pan American Games =

The Men's Boxing Tournament at the 1951 Pan American Games was held in Buenos Aires, Argentina, from February 25 to March 8, with the hosting nation winning in all eight weight divisions.

== Medal winners ==
| Event | Gold | Silver | Bronze |
|---|---|---|---|
| Flyweight (– 51 kilograms) | Alberto Barenghi; Argentina | Germán Pardo; Chile | Raul Macias; Mexico |
| Bantamweight (– 54 kilograms) | Ricardo Gonzales; Argentina | Ali Martucci; Venezuela | Juan Rodríguez; Chile |
| Featherweight (– 57 kilograms) | Francisco Nuñez; Argentina | Augusto Carcamo; Chile | Juan Alvarado; Mexico |
| Lightweight (– 60 kilograms) | Oscar Gallardo; Argentina | Fernando Araneda; Chile | Willie Hunter; United States |
| Welterweight (– 67 kilograms) | Oscar Pietta; Argentina | Cristobal Hernández; Cuba | José Dávalos; Mexico |
| Middleweight (– 75 kilograms) | Ubaldo Pereira; Argentina | Paulo Sacoman; Brazil | Manuel Vargas; Chile |
| Light Heavyweight (– 81 kilograms) | Rinaldo Ansaloni; Argentina | Lucio Grotone; Brazil | John Stewart; United States |
| Heavyweight (+ 81 kilograms) | Jorge Vertone; Argentina | Víctor Bignon; Chile | Norvel Lee; United States |

== Medal table ==
| Place | Nation | Gold medal | Silver medal | Bronze medal | Total |
|---|---|---|---|---|---|
| 1 | Argentina | 8 | 0 | 0 | 8 |
| 2 | Chile | 0 | 4 | 2 | 6 |
| 3 | Brazil | 0 | 2 | 0 | 2 |
| 4 | Cuba | 0 | 1 | 0 | 1 |
| 4 | Venezuela | 0 | 1 | 0 | 1 |
| 6 | Mexico | 0 | 0 | 3 | 3 |
| 6 | United States | 0 | 0 | 3 | 3 |
| Total | | 8 | 8 | 8 | 24 |
