= Ana María Schultz =

Argentine swimmer

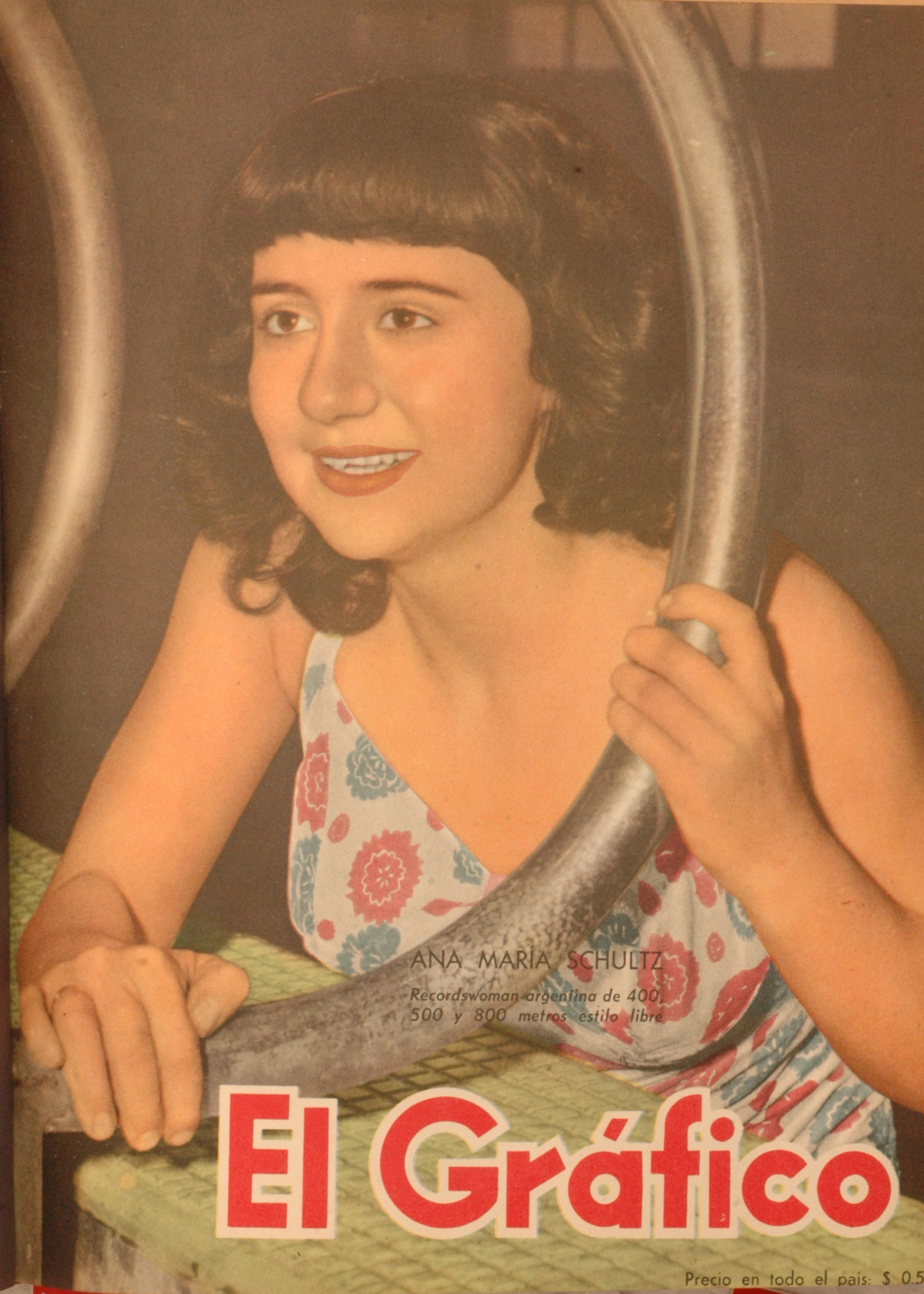

Personal information
- Born: October 9, 1935 (age 90)
Medal record
Women's swimming
Representing Argentina
Pan American Games
Gold medal – first place	1951 Buenos Aires	200m Freestyle
Gold medal – first place	1951 Buenos Aires	400m Freestyle
Silver medal – second place	1951 Buenos Aires	4x100m Freestyle
Silver medal – second place	1951 Buenos Aires	3x100m Medley
Bronze medal – third place	1951 Buenos Aires	100m Freestyle
Bronze medal – third place	1955 Mexico City	4×100 m freestyle

Ana María Schultz (born October 9, 1935) is an Argentine retired freestyle swimmer who represented her native country at the 1952 Summer Olympics in Helsinki, Finland. She claimed a total number of five medals at the 1951 Pan American Games, and trained in Club Atlético San Lorenzo de Almagro.
