= Modern pentathlon at the 1951 Pan American Games =

Modern pentathlon was one of 17 sports at the first Pan American Games in 1951, which took place in Buenos Aires, Argentina from 25 February to 3 March. There was an individual and team competition for men.

== Results ==
=== Men's events ===
Event	Gold	Silver	Bronze
Men's Individual	Eric Tinoco Marquez; Brazil	James Thompson; United States	Enrique Rettberg; Argentina
Men's Team	United States	Brazil	Argentina

=== Medal table ===
Rank	Nation	Gold	Silver	Bronze	Total
1	Brazil	1	1	0	2
1	United States	1	1	0	2
3	Argentina	0	0	2	2
Totals (3 entries)		2	2	2	6
