= Athletics at the 1959 Pan American Games – Men's long jump =

Men's long jump at the Pan American Games

The men's long jump event at the 1959 Pan American Games was held at the Soldier Field in Chicago on 29 August.

== Results ==
Rank	Name	Nationality	Result	Notes
1st place, gold medalist(s)	Irvin Roberson	United States	7.97	
2nd place, silver medalist(s)	Greg Bell	United States	7.60	
3rd place, bronze medalist(s)	Lester Bird	British West Indies	7.46	
4	Joel Wiley	United States	7.43	
5	Roberto Procel	Mexico	7.05	
6	Julio Llera	Puerto Rico	6.95	
7	Victor Hernández	Cuba	6.94	
8	Carlos Vera	Chile	6.87	
9	Felix Antonetti	Puerto Rico	6.81	
10	Cliff Murray	British Guiana	6.73	
11	Eduardo Krumm	Chile	6.33	
	Carlos Tornquist	Chile	NM	
	Adhemar da Silva	Brazil	DNS	
	Jack Smyth	Canada	DNS	
	Roland Romain	Haiti	DNS	
	Clive Bonas	Venezuela	DNS	
