= Athletics at the 1957 World University Games – Men's long jump =

The men's long jump event at the 1957 World University Games was held at the Stadium Charlety in Paris on 6 and 7 September 1957.

== Medalists ==
Gold	Silver	Bronze
Dieter Witte; West Germany	Vladimir Popov; Soviet Union	Branko Miler; Yugoslavia

== Results ==
=== Qualification ===
Rank	Group	Name	Nationality	Result	Notes
?	?	Capilla	Spain	6.67	

=== Final ===
Rank	Name	Nationality	#1	#2	#3	#4	#5	#6	Result	Notes
1st place, gold medalist(s)	Dieter Witte	West Germany	7.27	x	7.24	7.15	7.32	7.41	7.41	
2nd place, silver medalist(s)	Vladimir Popov	Soviet Union	7.09	7.01	7.23	7.06	7.14	7.19	7.23	
3rd place, bronze medalist(s)	Branko Miler	Yugoslavia	6.43	6.61	7.11	7.01	6.97	7.19	7.19	
4	Hiroshi Shibata	Japan	6.87	7.05	7.14	6.89	6.92	7.16	7.16	
5	Henryk Marucha	Poland	7.06	6.88	7.04	6.86	x	6.85	7.06	
6	Todor Marinov	Bulgaria	7.02	x	6.84	6.83	7.06	x	7.06	
7	Ary de Sá	Brazil							6.97	
8	Bolajedi Kuti	Nigeria							6.83	
9	Hubert Dufernez	France							6.80	
10	Andrzej Karcz	Poland							6.78	
11	Ernest Wanko	France							6.75	
12	Takeo Tamura	Japan							6.73	
