= Athletics at the 1963 Pan American Games – Men's long jump =

Men's long jump at the Pan American Games

The men's long jump event at the 1963 Pan American Games was held at the Pacaembu Stadium in São Paulo on 3 May.

== Results ==
Rank	Name	Nationality	Result	Notes
1st place, gold medalist(s)	Ralph Boston	United States	8.11	
2nd place, silver medalist(s)	Darrell Horn	United States	8.02	
3rd place, bronze medalist(s)	Juan Muñoz	Venezuela	7.46	
4	Roberto Procel	Mexico	7.31	
5	Victor Hernández	Cuba	7.12	
6	Newton de Castro	Brazil	6.89	
7	Francisco Grasso	Brazil	6.67	
	Carlos Tornquist	Chile	DNS	
	Roberto Abugattás	Peru	DNS	
	Carlos Monges	Peru	DNS	
	Trevor James	Trinidad and Tobago	DNS	
