= Adhemar da Silva =

Brazilian triple jumper and long jumper

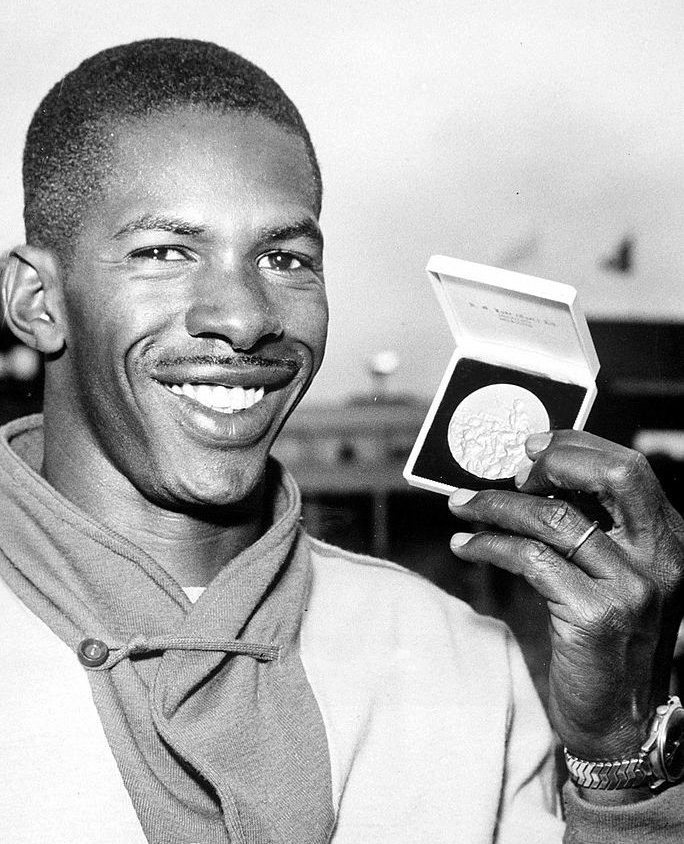
- Silva at the 1956 Olympics

Personal information
- Full name: Adhemar Ferreira da Silva
- Nickname: Hero of Helsinki
- Nationality: Brazilian
- Born: September 29, 1927 São Paulo, Brazil
- Died: January 12, 2001 (aged 73) São Paulo, Brazil
- Education: Federal University of Rio de Janeiro
- Height: 178 cm (5 ft 10 in)
- Weight: 69 kg (152 lb)

Sport
- Country: Brazil
- Sport: Athletics
- Events: Triple jump, long jump
- Club: São Paulo FC; Vasco da Gama, Rio de Janeiro
- Coached by: Dietrich Gerner

Achievements and titles
- Olympic finals: 1952 Summer Olympics; 1956 Summer Olympics
- Highest world ranking: 1
- Personal bests: TJ – 16.56 m (1955); LJ – 6.93 m (1951)
Medal record
Men's athletics
Representing Brazil
Event	1st	2nd	3rd
Olympic Games	2	0	0
South American Championships	3	1	1
Pan American Games	3	0	0
World University Games	3	0	0
Ibero-American Games	1	0	1
Total	12	1	2
Olympic Games
Gold medal – first place	1952 Helsinki	Triple jump
Gold medal – first place	1956 Melbourne	Triple jump
Pan American Games
Gold medal – first place	1951 Buenos Aires	Triple jump
Gold medal – first place	1955 Mexico City	Triple jump
Gold medal – first place	1959 Chicago	Triple jump
World Student Games
Gold medal – first place	1953 Dortmund	Triple jump
Gold medal – first place	1955 San Sebastián, Spain	Triple jump
Gold medal – first place	1957 Moscow	Triple jump
South American Championships
Gold medal – first place	1952 Buenos Aires	Triple jump
Gold medal – first place	1954 Sao Paulo	Triple jump
Gold medal – first place	1958 Montevideo	Triple jump
Silver medal – second place	1956 Santiago	4 × 400 metres relay
Bronze medal – third place	1949 Lima	Triple jump
Ibero-American Games
Gold medal – first place	1960 Santiago	Triple jump
Bronze medal – third place	1960 Santiago	Long jump
- Updated on April 27, 2022

Adhemar Ferreira da Silva (September 29, 1927 – January 12, 2001) was a Brazilian triple jumper. He won two Olympic gold medals and set five world records, the last being 16.56 metres in 1955 Pan American Games. In his early career he also competed in the long jump, placing fourth at the 1951 Pan American Games. He broke world records in triple jump on five occasions during his illustrious career. To date, he remains the only track and field athlete from South America to have won two Olympic gold medals.

He remained the sole Olympic gold medalist for Brazil until the 1980 Summer Olympics. He is regarded as one of the finest South American athletes in history, and for decades was the only Brazilian athlete to have won gold in two consecutive Olympics (a record that stood until 2012). He was the first Brazilian individual athlete to have set a world record in any sporting event. He became an extraordinary exceptional triple jumper despite not excelling in his speed and long jumping abilities.

Silva was a polyglot, having learned English, Finnish, French, Japanese, Italian, German, and Spanish in addition to Portuguese. He had close association with Czech veteran long-distance runner Emil Zátopek for over 50 years. Silva was a member of the São Paulo Futebol Clube, and because of him, the team coat has two gold stars above its emblem. He also had a short stint for Club de Regatas Vasco da Gama from 1955 to 1959.

== Biography ==
Silva was born in São Paulo, in a poor family. His father was a railway worker and his mother was a cook. He began competing in the triple jump in 1947. He originally wanted to be a professional footballer but he switched to triple jumping after trying it for the first time at the age of 19. Until the age of 19, he had not taken up athletics. He would call his lifelong mentor and coach Dietrich Gerner as his "German dad" and the duo maintained a very strong bond. He soon rose to prominence climbing the ladders and rising through the ranks within a short timeframe.

== Career ==
He jumped 13.05 metres in his first ever triple jump meet in 1947 and it garnered significant praise for him. He bettered his personal best a year later when he reached 15.00 metres in 1948. He graduated as a sculptor from the Federal Institute of São Paulo in 1948.

=== 1948 Olympics and beyond ===
He made his maiden Olympic appearance representing Brazil at the 1948 Summer Olympics which was held in London and jumped 14.490 metres in the final securing an eighth-place finish. In 1949, he shattered the South American continental record in triple jump held by Argentina's Luis Brunetto by jumping 15.51m twice. He claimed a bronze medal in the men's triple jump event at the 1949 South American Athletics Championships.

In the 1950s, he worked as a civil servant for the São Paulo State Government. He was employed as a civil servant which meant he had to work during morning and afternoon while he would undergo athletics training in the lunchtime or at the end of working day and later he would study at night.

=== 1951 Pan American Games and 1952 Olympics ===
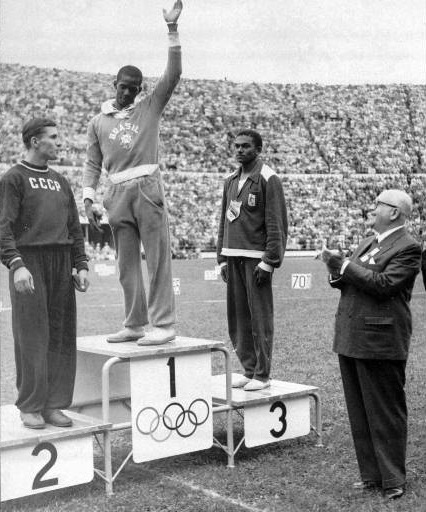
Adhemar da Silva posing with his gold medal in the victory podium during 1952 Summer Olympics medal ceremony for triple jump

In December 1950, he equaled the 14-year-old world record in triple jump of Japan's Naoto Tajima (who set the record in 1936 Summer Olympics in Berlin) by jumping 16.00 metres. He also plied his trade in long jump early in his career and subsequently competed at the 1951 Pan American Games which was held in Buenos Aires where he was placed fourth in the men's long jump event. During the same 1951 Pan American Games, he claimed gold medal in the men's triple jump event which was his maiden gold medal at a Pan American Games event. He set another world record in September 1951 during a Brazilian national meet in Rio de Janeiro, just months before the highly anticipated 1952 Olympics and his world record performance of 16.01 metres made him a clear favorite to claim gold at the 1952 Helsinki Olympics. He also claimed a gold medal in the men's triple jump event at the 1952 South American Championships in Athletics.

He lived up to the hype and expectations in the 1952 Olympics representing Brazil as he qualified for the final of the men's triple jump category, a much improved performance as far as his standards are concerned from his previous Olympic appearance. During the triple jump final on July 23, 1952, he made steady progress by leaping a distance of 15.95 metres with his opening jump. He comfortably claimed the gold medal in the end, setting two world records in less than two hours in the final including a 16.12 metres jump in round 2 following it up with an even better jump of 16.22 metres in round 5. He set the 1952 Summer Olympics on fire by breaking the world records and Olympic records in triple jump event during the final on four occasions including 16.12 metres jump in round 2, 16.09 metres jump in round 4, 16.22 metres jump in round 5 and 16.05 metres jump in final round. He managed to surpass the 16.00 metres benchmark four times in a same triple jump event which was considered as something impossible. Prior to his 1952 Olympic exploits, the 16.00 metres mark was surpassed by athletes only three times including twice by Adhemar himself. Popular world renowned French athletics writer Alain Billouin had described Adhemar's record breaking performance in the 1952 Olympics as "Gracefully, he skimmed through each hop-step-and-jump, displaying the poise and fitnesse of a samba dancer." He also met Czech Republic's Emil Zatopek during the 1952 Olympics as the latter also became Olympic champion in 5000m, 10000m and marathon events.

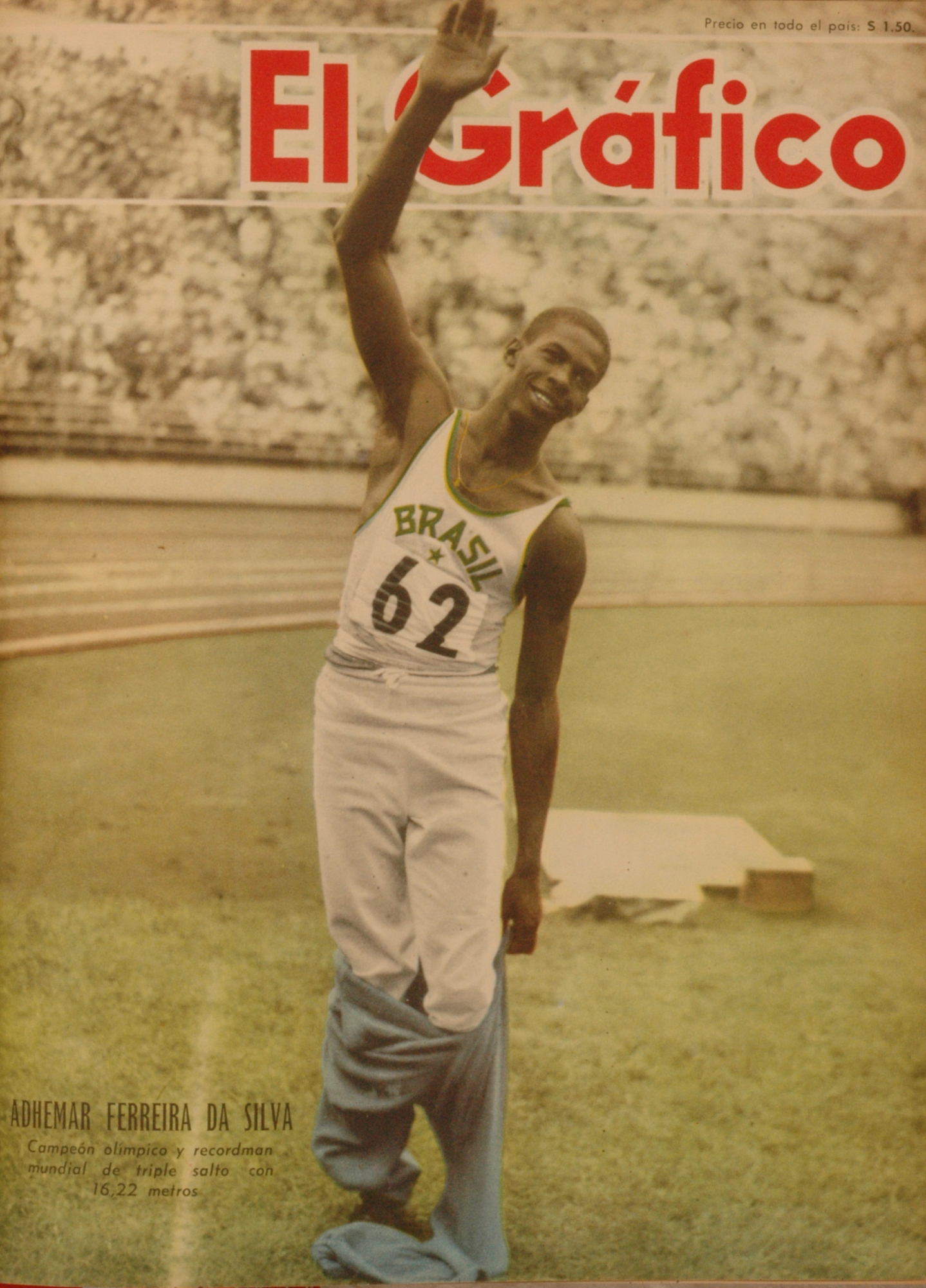
Adhemar Ferreira da Silva on the cover of the Argentinian magazine El Gráfico on September 5, 1952

He created the "Victory lap" after winning the gold medal at the 1952 Olympics which would go onto become the trademark for future Olympic champions. He soon became popular among Finnish people due to his Finnish-language speaking abilities and he often appeared on the front page of newspapers not just due to his Olympic medal success but also due to the fact that when reporters asked questions to him in English he replied to them in Finnish language. He taught himself Finnish and had conversations with fans when he was in Helsinki, Finland for the Olympics. He also sang songs in Finnish and he apparently learnt the Finnish language from a Finnish family which stayed and lived in his home town of São Paulo so that he could use the language fluency for the betterment of himself in order to enjoy his Olympic appearance.

=== Post 1952 Olympics ===
He won the triple jump title at the Japan Athletic Championships in 1952. He secured gold medal in triple jump event during the 1953 Summer International University Sports Week. He clinched a gold medal in the triple jump event at the 1954 South American Championships in Athletics.

=== 1955 Pan American Games and 1956 Olympics ===
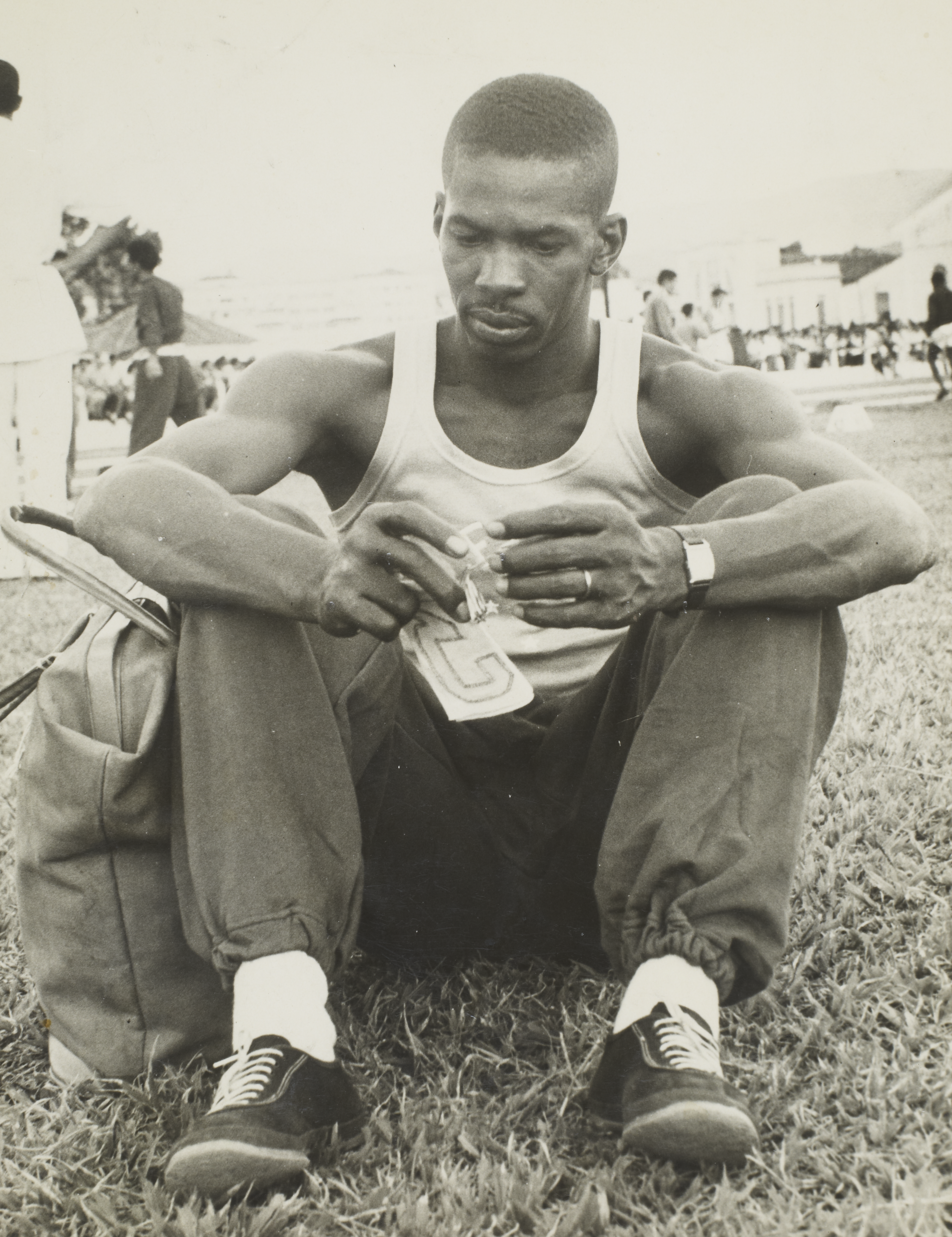
Adhemar Ferreira da Silva in 1956

However, his triple jump world record short-lived only for a year as Soviet Union's Leonid Shcherbakov broke the world record by just 0.01 metre in 1953. Two years later in 1955, he reclaimed his world record from Leonid when he landed a massive leap of 16.56 metres in the men's triple jump at the 1955 Pan American Games in what was also coincidentally his 100th competition. He also managed to defend his Pan American Games title which was also his second Pan American Games gold medal. He also competed in the men's long jump event at the 1955 Pan American Games but failed to progress to the next round. He also clinched gold medal in the triple jump event at the 1955 Summer International University Sports Week.

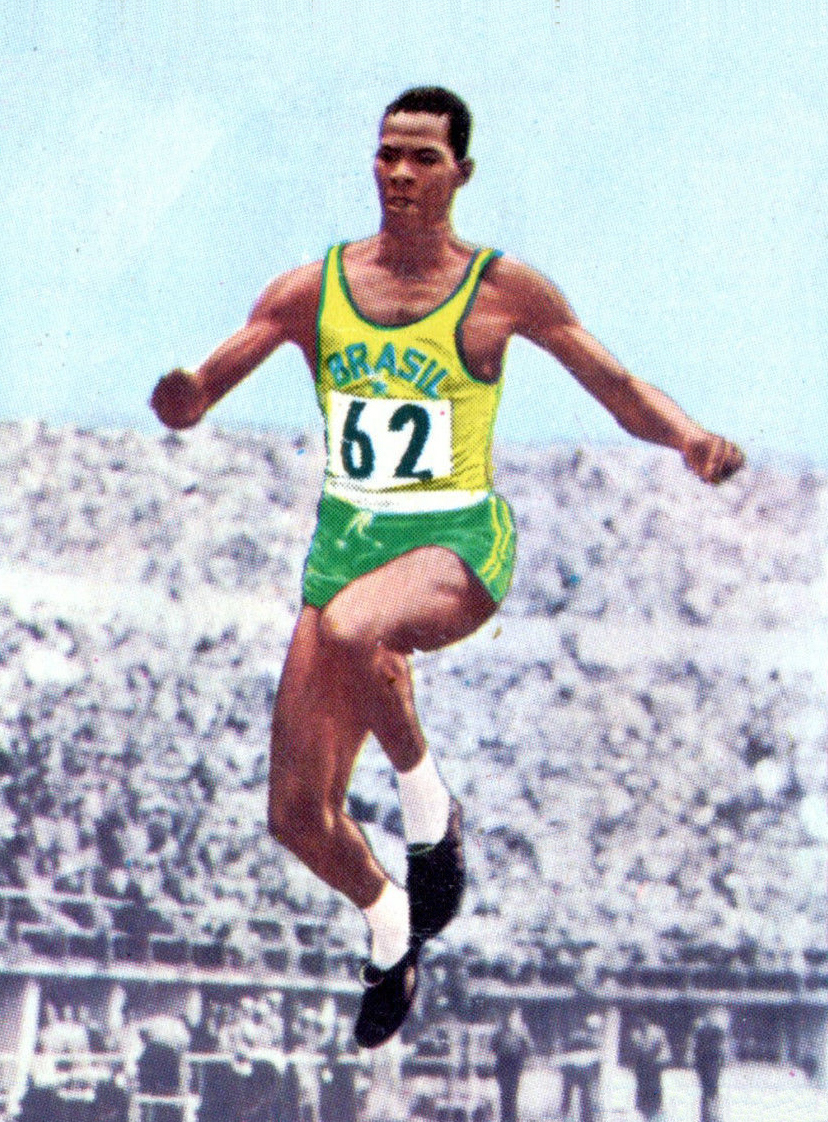
Coloured version of Adhemar da Silva

He again came into the fore as a pre-favorite just when the Olympics was looming and was hyped as a firm contender for gold medal in triple jump at 1956 Summer Olympics. He also served as the flagbearer for Brazil at the 1956 Summer Olympics in the opening ceremony. However, it was not easy for Adhemar to claim the Olympic title and defend the Olympic gold medal during the 1956 Olympics as Icelandic triple jumper Vilhjálmur Einarsson gave a run for his money in the finals. Einarsson who was on his Olympic debut took limelight and recognition in the 1956 Olympics after clearing a whopping 16.26 meters (which many call his jump was aided by the wind) in his second jump in the triple jump final to create a new Olympic record. Interestingly and coincidentally the Olympic record in men's triple jump was previously held by Adhemar who had jumped 16.22 meters during the 1952 Olympics. Einarsson's record jump of 16.26 meters stunned the spectators, organisers and fellow competitors including Adhemar, which also raised the expectations among the sporting fraternity that Einarsson would win the gold medal in the competition. Einarsson came in as a surprising element who gave an unexpected challenge for Adhemar with the latter's bid to reclaim the Olympic title was almost quashed. The presence of Einarsson made it even special as he was just one of only two athletes who would represent Iceland during the 1956 Summer Olympics. However, Adhemar bounced back strongly by breaking the Olympic record set by Einarsson during the same competition by jumping 16.35 meters in his fourth jump and as a result he was once again in contention for gold medal. Adhemar backed up his jump by equalling Einarsson's best jump in the fifth round (16.26 meters) and adding a 16.21 meters in the final round. In the end, Adhemar da Silva successfully defended his Olympic title at the 1956 Olympics largely due to the Olympic record leaping 16.35 metres in fourth round and also for recording over 16 metres jumps on three occasions. On the other spectrum, his rival Einarsson had to settle for a silver medal which also ensured Iceland's first ever medal at an Olympic event. The gold medal achievement by Adhemar turned out to be the second Olympic gold medal of his career and thus went onto become the first Brazilian to secure gold medals in two successive Olympic appearances.

He secured a silver medal in the 4 × 400 metres relay event at the 1956 South American Championships in Athletics.

=== Post 1956 Olympics ===
He also claimed gold in men's triple jump at the 6th World Festival of Youth and Students in 1957. He claimed a gold medal in men's triple jump at the 1958 South American Championships in Athletics.

=== 1959 Pan American Games and 1960 Olympics ===
He represented Brazil at the Pan American Games for the third consecutive time in 1959 which was also his final Pan American Games appearance. He eventually completed a hat-trick of gold medals and Pan American titles with a gold medal in men's triple jump event during the multi-sport event. He bid adieu to Pan American Games with an unbeaten record in men's triple jump events and his gold medal achievement at 1959 Pan American Games in Chicago turned out to be his last ever medal at Pan American Games. However, he could not able to showcase the momentum in men's long jump event at the 1959 Pan American Games as he failed to progress to the final. He clinched a gold medal and a bronze medal in the triple jump and long jump events respectively at the 1960 Ibero-American Games.

He later made his fourth and the final appearance at the Olympics when he took part in the 1960 Summer Olympics. He was also the flagbearer for Brazil during the opening ceremony of the 1960 Rome Olympics and he subsequently became the first Brazilian athlete to serve as a flagbearer in two Olympic events. However, he could not end his Olympic career in a way that he would have wanted as he managed only 14th position in the finals and also failed to replicate his medal success like in previous two Olympic events. But critics pointed out he may have fallen ill during the course of the games which resulted in his sub par performance. The crowd shouted and enchanted "Orfeu!" at him due to his role in the film, which was largely popular in Italy. He also received strong applause and standing ovation from the crowd when he hung his boots from international athletics with this final Olympic appearance coming at the age of 33.

== Acting career ==
In 1959, Adhemar acted in the musical film Orfeu Negro (Black Orpheus) based on a play titled Orfeu da Conceição by Vinicius de Moraes. He portrayed the role as Death and the film received positive reviews from critics. The film also won the Golden Palm of the Cannes Film Festival and an Academy Award for Best Foreign Language Film. It was revealed that he received the film offer while he was studying for a physical education degree. He was preferred for the acting role due to his athletic body and he did not act in any other films as he did not have much interest in doing films which ultimately ended his film acting career. American anthropologist Ann Dunham who is also the mother of former American President Barack Obama insisted that Orfeu Negro was her favorite film. He is still recognized as one of only few Olympic gold medalists to have played a major role in films.

== Later career ==
He obtained his physical education degree from the Escola Preparatória de Cadetes do Exército (Preparatory School of Cadets of the Brazilian Army) in 1968. He received his law degree from the Federal University of Rio de Janeiro in 1968. He received his public relations degree from the Faculdade Cásper Líbero in 1990. Surprisingly, he pursued an interest to study public relations at the age of 60. He worked for the diplomatic service as Brazil's cultural attache in Lagos, Nigeria from 1964 to 1967.

He also worked as a newspaper columnist and as a television commentator in athletics. He also mentored Brazilian sports administrators including the former sports minister of Brazil Carlos Melles in 2000. He also launched programs for deprived children to groom them to take up sports in order to ensure social advancement for children and to safeguard them from violence and drugs.

== Death ==
Adhemar died of a heart attack on January 12, 2001, aged 73. He had quit smoking only two years prior and was also suffering from diabetes and pneumonia.

== Legacy ==
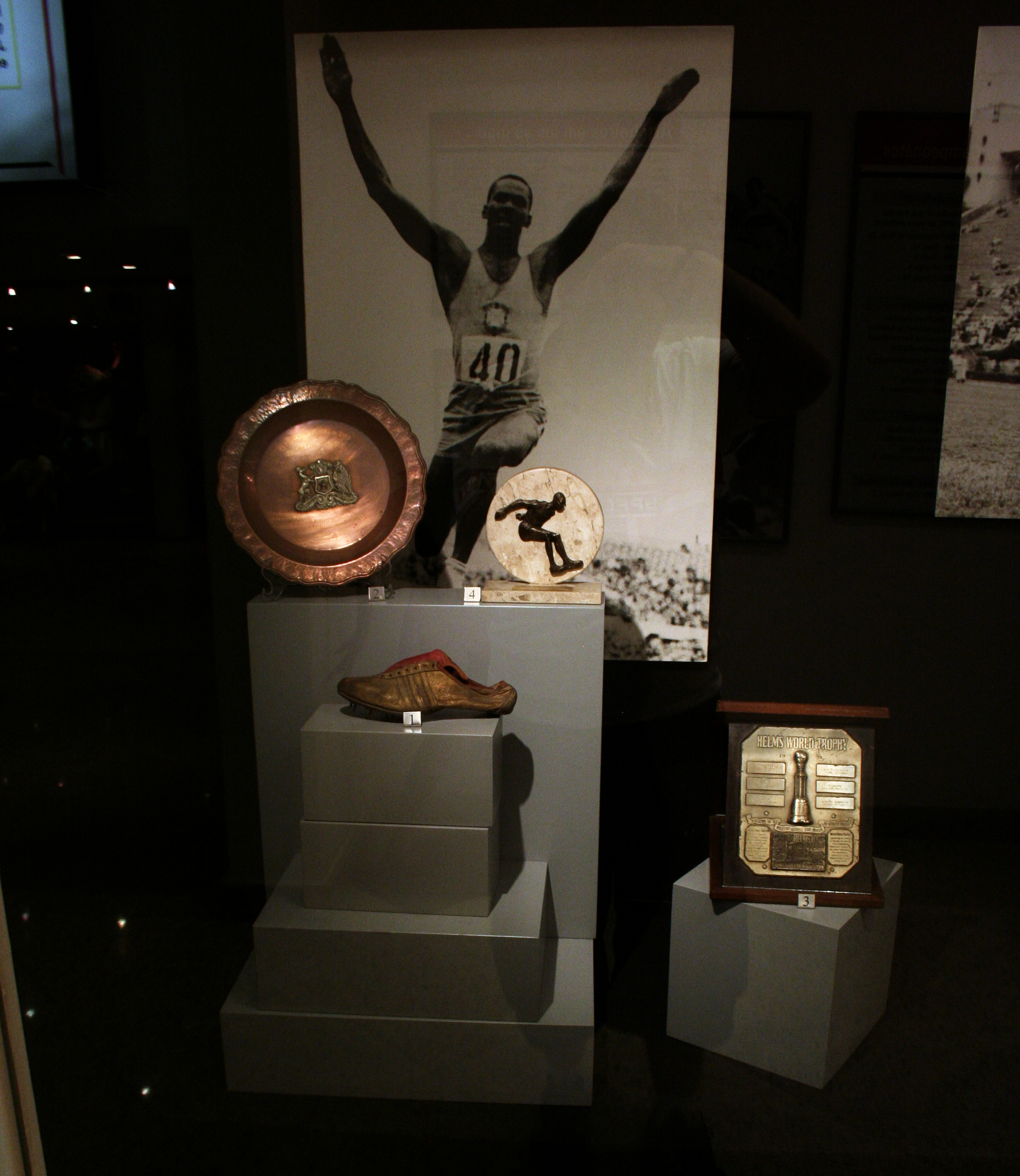
The statue of Adhemar Ferreira da Silva in a memorial located at the Morumbi stadium

During the 1952 Olympics, he was hailed as the "Hero of Helsinki" and received huge support from Finnish people due to his outgoing personality and Finnish language fluency. A crowd consisting of around 70,000 audience chanted his name when he competed in the event. He was also given a standing ovation during the medal presentation and a judge handed him the Flag of Brazil and told him: "The public wants you to take a walk."

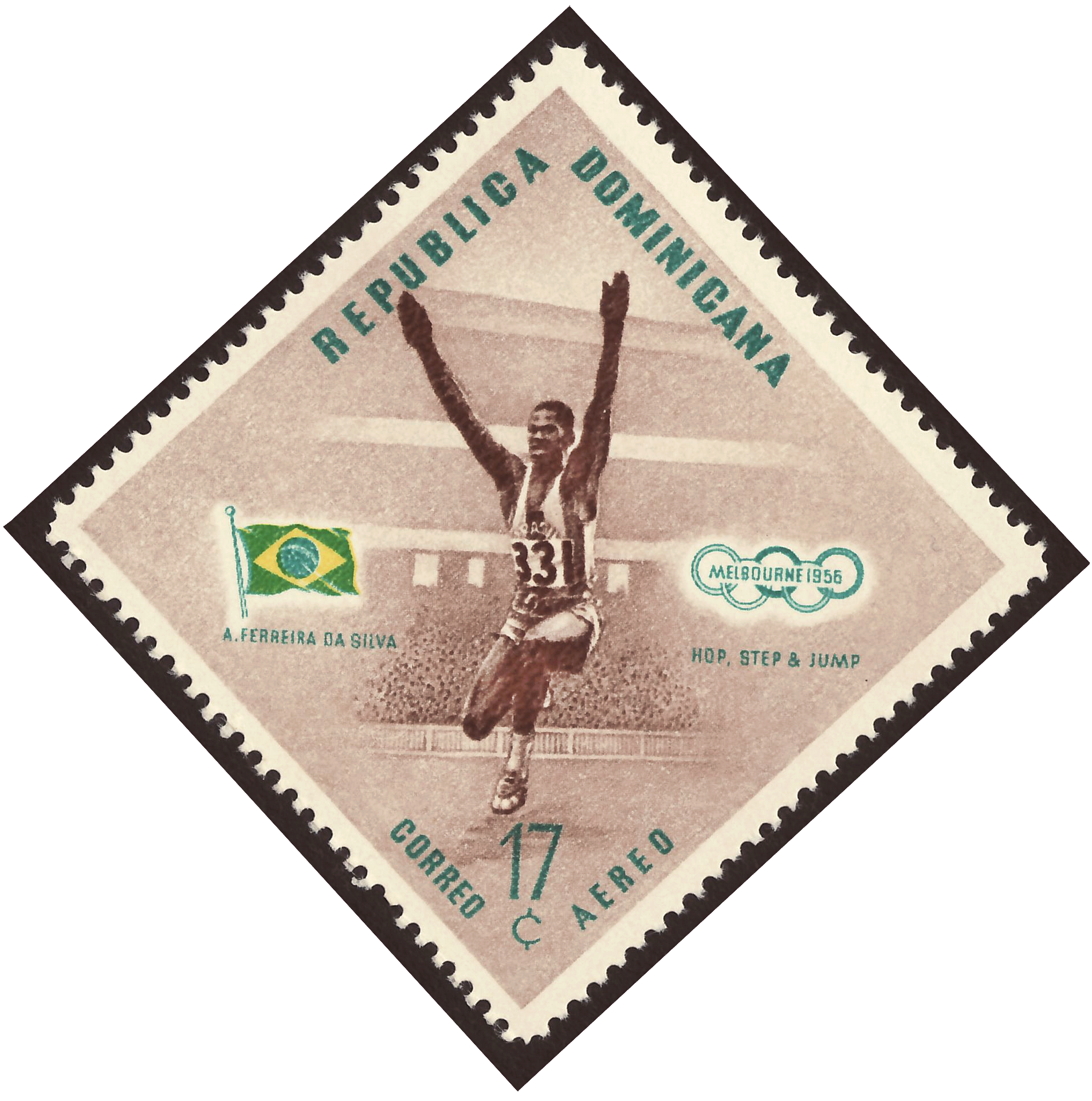
Airmail stamp issued by Postal administration of the Dominican Republic which depicted the victory lap created by Adhemar during the 1956 Summer Olympics in Melbourne

On July 18, 1957, the Dominican Postal Institute from Dominican Republic issued an airmail stamp which included the victory lap created by Adhemar during the 1956 Summer Olympics in Melbourne.

He was the torchbearer during the 1963 Summer Universiade which was held in Porto Alegre, Brazil.

In 1987, he was honored by the IAAF in Rome where his notable jumps in Helsinki Olympics was also chosen as one of the all-time 100 Golden Moments. IAAF launched a book and a video featuring 100 athletes and 100 performances to mark the organization's 75th anniversary.

In 1993, he was given a standing ovation in Helsinki when he was invited as a chief guest for an athletics meeting.

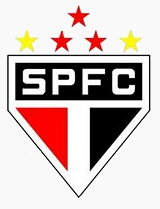
two gold stars which are visible on São Paulo FC logo depicts the then world records set by Adhemar

His world record exploits in 1952 and 1955 have been marked by the presence of two gold stars on the badge of the São Paulo football club and Adhemar held membership in the football club.

Australian Olympic volunteer Rosemary Mula and her husband Wilf both befriended Adhemar and Adhemar eventually stayed at the apartment owned by Rosemary and Wilf during the 2000 Summer Olympics. Rosemary was fifteen when she witnessed Adhemar's Melbourne Olympics gold medal performance and she was one of the girls among the spectators to have cheered for him. Following the death of Adhemar, both Rosemary and her spouse Wilf set up a scholarship that pays for an exchange between Australian and Brazilian schools. His name has been prescribed for the Brazil-Australia exchange program for the young athletes.

Adhemar's daughter Adyel initiated 'Jump for Life' project on remembrance of her father and also to help people from underprivileged and deprived areas to athletics.

In 2012, he was inducted into the IAAF Hall of Fame.

However, the Brazilian Olympic Committee and the organisers of the 2016 Summer Olympics failed to acknowledge the contributions of Adhemar da Silva during the course of the event which was later subjected to sharp criticism from fans, critics and also the family members of Adhemar.

In 2019, the shoes and spikes worn by Adhemar during 1956 Olympics were displayed in the IAAF Heritage World Athletics Championships Exhibition which was held in Doha, Qatar. The spikes worn by him are currently kept as treasures in The National Sports Museum at the Melbourne Cricket Ground where the 1956 Olympics were also held.

== International competitions ==
Year	Competition	Venue	Position	Event	Notes
Representing Brazil
1948	Olympic Games	London, United Kingdom	8th	Triple jump	14.49 m
1949	South American Championships	Lima, Peru	3rd	Triple jump	14.79 m
1951	Pan American Games	Buenos Aires, Argentina	4th	Long jump	6.93 m
1951	Pan American Games	Buenos Aires, Argentina	1st	Triple jump	15.24 m
1952	South American Championships	Buenos Aires, Argentina	5th	Long jump	6.86 m
1952	South American Championships	Buenos Aires, Argentina	1st	Triple jump	15.39 m
1952	Olympic Games	Helsinki, Finland	1st	Triple jump	16.22 m
1953	South American Championships (unofficial)	Santiago, Chile	1st	Triple jump	15.61 m
1953	International University Sports Week	Dortmund, West Germany	1st	Triple jump	15.92 m
1954	South American Championships	São Paulo, Brazil	1st	Triple jump	16.22 m
1955	Pan American Games	Mexico City, Mexico	–	Long jump	NM
1955	Pan American Games	Mexico City, Mexico	1st	Triple jump	16.56 m
1955	International University Sports Week	San Sebastián, Spain	1st	Triple jump	15.99 m
1956	Olympic Games	Melbourne, Australia	1st	Triple jump	16.35 m
1957	South American Championships (unofficial)	Santiago, Chile	1st	Triple jump	15.59 m
1957	World Festival of Youth and Students	Moscow, Soviet Union	1st	Triple jump	15.92 m
1958	South American Championships	Montevideo, Uruguay	1st	Triple jump	15.70 m
1959	South American Championships (unofficial)	São Paulo, Brazil	1st	Triple jump	15.69 m
1959	Pan American Games	Chicago, United States	1st	Triple jump	15.90 m
1960	Olympic Games	Rome, Italy	14th	Triple jump	15.07 m
1960	Ibero-American Games	Santiago, Chile	3rd	Long jump	7.07 m
1960	Ibero-American Games	Santiago, Chile	1st	Triple jump	15.83 m

== See also ==
- List of Olympic medalists in athletics (men)
- List of Brazilian sportspeople
- Brazil at the Olympics
- List of Brazilians of Black African descent
- List of Pan American Games medalists in athletics (men)

Records
Preceded by Naoto Tajima; Leonid Shcherbakov	Men's triple jump world record holder December 3, 1950 – July 19, 1953; March 16, 1955 – July 19, 1958	Succeeded by Leonid Shcherbakov; Oleg Ryakhovskiy
