= Athletics at the 1951 Pan American Games – Men's triple jump =

Men's triple jump at the Pan American Games

The men's triple jump event at the 1951 Pan American Games was held at the Estadio Monumental in Buenos Aires on 2 March.

== Results ==
| Rank | Name | Nationality | Result | Notes |
|---|---|---|---|---|
| 1st place, gold medalist(s) | Adhemar da Silva | Brazil | 15.24 | |
| 2nd place, silver medalist(s) | Hélio da Silva | Brazil | 15.17 | |
| 3rd place, bronze medalist(s) | Bruno Witthaus | Argentina | 14.34 | |
| 4 | Gaylord Bryan | United States | 14.21 | |
| 5 | Jorge Aguirre | Mexico | 13.92 | |
| 6 | Edgar Andrade | Ecuador | 13.83 | |
| 7 | Juan Carlos Guerrero | Argentina | 13.75 | |
| 8 | Udo Martín | Chile | 13.68 | |
| 9 | Celestino Sarrúa | Argentina | 13.67 | |
| 10 | Carlos Puebla | Chile | 13.58 | |
| 11 | Jim Holland | United States | 13.21 | |
| | Carlos Vera | Chile | DNS | |
