= Athletics at the 1955 Summer International University Sports Week – Men's long jump =

The men's long jump event at the 1955 International University Sports Week was held in San Sebastián on 11 August 1955.

== Medalists ==
Gold	Silver	Bronze
Ary de Sá; Brazil	Heinz Oberbeck; West Germany	Chiyoko Teruya; Japan

== Results ==
=== Qualification ===
Rank	Athlete	Nationality	Result	Notes
1	Ary de Sá	Brazil	7.47	Q
2	Valerio Colatore	Italy	7.16	Q
3	Heinz Oberbeck	West Germany	7.14	Q
4	Yushiro Sonoda	Japan	7.13	Q
5	Chiyoko Teruya	Japan	7.06	Q
6	Canattieri	Italy	6.90	Q
7	Manuel Francisco González	Spain	6.80	
8	Stanley Orman	Great Britain	6.80	
9	Erwin Müller	Switzerland	6.80	
10	José Alonso Peralta	Spain	6.79	
11	Sebastián Junqueras	Spain	6.72	
12	Peter Röthig	West Germany	6.58	
13	Watkins	Great Britain	6.58	
14	Akaru Abe	Japan	6.56	
15	Vic Matthews	Great Britain	6.42	
16	Erich Ladwein	Saar	6.39	
17	Luitpold Maier	West Germany	6.36	

=== Final ===
Rank	Name	Nationality	Result	Notes
1st place, gold medalist(s)	Ary de Sá	Brazil	7.50	
2nd place, silver medalist(s)	Heinz Oberbeck	West Germany	7.37	
3rd place, bronze medalist(s)	Chiyoko Teruya	Japan	7.17	
4	Valerio Colatore	Italy	7.16	
5	Yushiro Sonoda	Japan	7.13	
6	Canattieri	Italy	7.03	
