= Magda Bruggemann =

Mexican swimmer (born 1930)

Personal information
- Full name: Magda Bruggemann Schmidt
- Other names: Magda Brueggemann de Kneip
- Born: 12 May 1930 Mexico City, Mexico
- Died: May 3, 2024 (aged 93).

Sport
- Sport: Swimming

Magda Bruggemann (1930-2024) was a Mexican swimmer and actress of Dutch and Polish ancestry.

== Biography ==
Bruggemann was born in Mexico City to Diederich Bruggeman from the Netherlands and Frieda Schmidt from Poland.

=== Swimming career ===
Bruggemann was Mexican national champion and competed in three events at the 1948 Summer Olympics. At the 1951 Pan American Games she won an individual bronze medal at the 100m backstroke and a bronze medal at the relay event.

=== Acting career ===
After her marriage with Roman Kneip she took up an acting career as Magda Brueggemann de Kneip. She had a role in Arturo Ripstein´s El crimen del cácaro gumaro.
