= Athletics at the 1955 Summer International University Sports Week – Men's triple jump =

The men's triple jump event at the 1955 International University Sports Week was held in San Sebastián on 14 August 1955.

The winning margin was an enormous 81 cm which as of 2024 remains the only time the men's triple jump was won by more than 60 cm at these games.

== Medalists ==
| Gold | Silver | Bronze |
|---|---|---|
| Adhemar da Silva; Brazil | Akaru Abe; Japan | Antonio Trogu; Italy |

== Results ==
=== Qualification ===
| Rank | Athlete | Nationality | Result | Notes |
|---|---|---|---|---|
| 1 | Adhemar da Silva | Brazil | 15.83 | Q |
| 2 | Akaru Abe | Japan | 14.98 | Q |
| 3 | Yushiro Sonoda | Japan | 14.62 | Q |
| 4 | Atef Ismaïl | Egypt | 14.30 | Q |
| 5 | Antonio Trogu | Italy | 14.13 | Q |
| 6 | Erwin Müller | Switzerland | 14.12 | Q |
| 7 | Manuel Surroca | Spain | 13.84 | |
| 8 | Chiyoko Teruya | Japan | 13.79 | |
| 9 | Heinz Denk | West Germany | 13.31 | |
| 10 | James Monteith | Jamaica | 13.21 | |
| 11 | Leandro García | Spain | 12.93 | |
| 12 | Manuel Francisco González | Spain | 12.57 | |

=== Final ===
| Rank | Name | Nationality | Result | Notes |
|---|---|---|---|---|
| 1st place, gold medalist(s) | Adhemar da Silva | Brazil | 15.99 | GR |
| 2nd place, silver medalist(s) | Akaru Abe | Japan | 15.18 | |
| 3rd place, bronze medalist(s) | Antonio Trogu | Italy | 14.96 | |
| 4 | Yushiro Sonoda | Japan | 14.79 | |
| 5 | Atef Ismaïl | Egypt | 14.30 | |
| 6 | Erwin Müller | Switzerland | 14.12 | |
