= Hélio da Silva =

Brazilian sprinter and triple jumper (1923–1987)

Personal information
- Full name: Hélio Coutinho da Silva
- Born: 2 December 1923 Rio de Janeiro, Brazil
- Died: 12 July 1987 (aged 63) Rio de Janeiro, Brazil
- Height: 185 cm (6 ft 1 in)
- Weight: 72 kg (159 lb)

Sport
- Sport: Athletics
- Events: 100 metres, 200 metres, Triple jump, Long jump
Medal record
Men's athletics
Representing Brazil
Pan American Games
Silver medal – second place	1951 Buenos Aires	Triple jump

Hélio Coutinho da Silva (Note: This name uses Portuguese naming customs: the first or maternal family name is Coutinho and the second or paternal family name is da Silva.) (2 December 1923 – 12 July 1987) was a Brazilian sprinter and triple jumper.

At the 1948 Summer Olympics in London, he competed in the men's 100 metres, 4 × 100 metres relay and triple jump. At the 1951 Pan American Games in Buenos Aires, he won a silver medal in the triple jump as well as competing in the men's 100 metres, 200 metres and long jump.

Da Silva died in Rio de Janeiro on 12 July 1987, at the age of 63.

== International competitions ==
Year	Competition	Venue	Position	Event	Notes
Representing Brazil
1946	South American Championships (unofficial)	Santiago, Chile	2nd	Triple jump	14.84 m
1948	Olympic Games	London, United Kingdom	26th (h)	100 m	11.09 s
1948	Olympic Games	London, United Kingdom	8th (h)	4 × 100 m relay	42.4 s
1948	Olympic Games	London, United Kingdom	11th	Triple jump	14.31 m
1949	South American Championships	Lima, Peru	4th	4 × 100 m relay	43.1 s
1949	South American Championships	Lima, Peru	1st	Triple jump	15.26 m
1951	Pan American Games	Buenos Aires, Argentina	4th	100 m	11.0 s
1951	Pan American Games	Buenos Aires, Argentina	2nd	Triple jump	15.17 m
1954	South American Championships	São Paulo, Brazil	2nd	Triple jump	14.86 m
