= List of Brazilian sportspeople =

This is a partial list of Brazilian sportspeople.

== Athletics ==
- Joaquim Cruz (born 1963)
- José da Conceição (born 1931)
- Adhemar da Silva (born 1927)
- Arnaldo da Silva (born 1964)
- Claudinei da Silva (born 1970)
- Robson da Silva (born 1964)
- Vanderlei Cordeiro de Lima (born 1969)
- Vicente de Lima (born 1977)
- João Carlos de Oliveira (born 1954)
- André da Silva (born 1972)
- Maurren Maggi (born 1976)
- Nelson Prudêncio (born 1924)
- Édson Ribeiro (born 1972)
- Cláudio Roberto Souza (born 1970)

== Basketball ==
- Anderson Varejão (born 1982), NBA player (Cleveland Cavaliers)
- Hortência, (born 1959)
- Leandrinho (born 1982), NBA player (Phoenix Suns)
- Nenê, (born 1982), NBA player (Denver Nuggets)
- Oscar Schmidt, (born 1958)
- Paula, (born 1962)

== Bobsled ==
- Eric Maleson (born 1967), 2002 Olympic Athlete - pilot

== Boxing ==
- Eder Jofre - world champion
- Maguila - heavyweight
- Acelino Freitas (Popó), (born 1975), world champion

== Football ==
- Ademir da Guia (born 1942)
- Adriano (born 1982)
- Aldair (born 1965)
- Arthur Friedenreich (1892–1969)
- Bebeto (born 1964)
- Cafu (born 1970)
- Careca (born 1960)
- Carlos Alberto (born 1944)
- Carlos Alberto Parreira (born 1943)
- Clodoaldo (born 1949)
- Cristiane (born 1985)
- Djalma Dias (1939–1990)
- Djalma Santos (born 1929)
- Garrincha (born 1933)
- Gérson (born 1941)
- Gilmar (born 1930)
- Jairzinho (born 1944)
- Juninho Pernambucano (born 1975)
- Kaká (born 1982)
- Léo Júnior (born 1954)
- Leônidas da Silva (1913–2004)
- Luís Fabiano (born 1980)
- Luis Pereira (born 1949)
- Marcos (born 1973)
- Marta (born 1986)
- José Altafini (born 1938)
- Neymar (born 1992)
- Nílton Santos (born 1927)
- Pelé (born 1940)
- Raí (born 1965)
- Robinho (born 1984)
- Rivaldo (born 1972)
- Rivellino (born 1946)
- Roberto Carlos (born 1973)
- Rogério Ceni (born 1973)
- Romário (born 1966)
- Ronaldinho (born 1980)
- Ronaldo (born 1976)
- Sócrates (1954–2011)
- Toninho Cerezo (born 1955)
- Tostão (born 1947)
- Vavá (1934–2002)
- Zico (born 1953)

== Golf ==
- Angela Park (born 1988)

== Judo ==
- Aurélio Miguel (born 1964)
- Carlos Honorato (born 1974)
- Denílson Lourenço (born 1977)
- Edinanci Silva (born 1976)
- Flávio Canto (born 1975)
- João Derly (born 1981)
- Ketleyn Quadros (born 1987)
- Leandro Guilheiro (born 1983)
- Luciano Corrêa (born 1982)
- Rogério Sampaio (born 1967)
- Tiago Camilo (born 1982)

== Martial arts/Mixed martial arts ==
- Allan Goes
- Anderson Silva
- Antônio Rodrigo Nogueira
- Antônio Rogério Nogueira
- Carlos Gracie Jr.
- Carlson Gracie
- Charles Oliveira
- Demian Maia
- Eduardo de Lima
- Fabrício Werdum
- Gabriel Gonzaga
- Hélio Gracie
- Hermes Franca
- Jorge Gurgel
- Lyoto Machida
- Marco Ruas
- Mario Sperry
- Mauricio "Shogun" Rua
- Murilo Bustamante
- Murilo "Ninja" Rua
- Paulo Filho
- Pedro Rizzo
- Renato "Babalu" Sobral
- Ricardo Arona
- Rickson Gracie
- Royce Gracie
- Thiago Silva
- Vitor Belfort
- Vítor Ribeiro
- Wallid Ismail
- Wanderlei Silva
- Wilson Gouveia
- Marcio Navarro

== Racing ==
- Alex Ribeiro (born 1948), Formula One driver
- Andre Ribeiro (born 1966), Champ Car driver
- Ayrton Senna (1960–1994), Formula One driver
- Bruno Senna (born 1983), Formula One and Le Mans Series driver
- Bruno Junqueira (born 1976), Champ Car driver
- Carlos Pace (1944–1977), Formula One driver
- Christian Fittipaldi (born 1971), Formula One and Champ Car driver
- Cristiano da Matta (born 1973), Formula One and Champ Car driver
- Emerson Fittipaldi (born 1946), Formula One and Champ Car driver
- Enrique Bernoldi (born 1978), Formula One, Indy Racing League and Superleague Formula
- Felipe Massa (born 1981), Formula One driver
- Fernando Rees (born 1985), Le Mans Series driver
- Gil de Ferran (born 1967), Indy Car and Champ Car driver
- Hélio Castroneves (born 1975), Indy Racing League driver
- Maurício Gugelmin (born 1963), Formula One and Champ Car driver
- Nelson Piquet (born 1952), Formula One driver
- Nelson Piquet Jr. (born 1985), Formula One driver
- Pedro Diniz (born 1970), Formula One driver
- Raul Boesel (born 1957), Formula One, Indy Car and Champ Car driver
- Roberto Moreno (born 1948), Formula One, Indy Car and Champ Car driver
- Ricardo Rosset (born 1968), Formula One driver
- Ricardo Zonta (born 1976), Formula One, FIA GT Championship and Rolex Sports Car Series driver
- Rubens Barrichello (born 1972), Formula One driver
- Tony Kanaan (born 1974), Indy Car and Champ Car driver
- Tarso Marques (born 1976), TC2000 and Stock Car Brasil
- Vítor Meira (born 1977), Indy Car driver
- Wilson Fittipaldi (born 1943), Formula One driver
- Lucas di Grassi (born 1984), Formula One and Formula E driver

== Rodeo ==
- Adriano Moraes (born 1970), three-time PBR world champion
- Guilherme Marchi (born 1982), bull rider on the PBR circuit

== Skateboarding ==
- Bob Burnquist (born 1976), skateboarder
- Fabiola da Silva (born 1979), aggressive inline skater
- Sandro Dias (born 1975)

== Swimming ==
- César Cielo (born 1987)
- Flávia Delaroli (born 1983)
- Fabíola Molina (born 1985)
- Gabriel Mangabeira (born 1982)
- Gustavo Borges (born 1972)
- Kaio Márcio (born 1984)
- Lucas Salatta (born 1987)
- Maria Lenk (1915–2007)
- Poliana Okimoto (born 1983)
- Thiago Pereira (born 1986)
- Xuxa (born 1974)

== Taekwondo ==
- Diogo Silva (born 1982)
- Natália Falavigna (born 1984)

== Tennis ==
- André Sá (born 1977)
- Fernando Meligeni (born 1971)
- Flávio Saretta (born 1980)
- Gustavo Kuerten, (born 1976)(number one of the world in 2001
- Jaime Oncins (born 1970)
- Luiz Mattar (born 1963)
- Marcelo Melo (born 1983)
- Marcos Daniel (born 1978)
- Maria Ester Bueno (born 1939)
- Ricardo Acioly (born 1964)
- Thomaz Bellucci (born 1987)
- Beatriz Haddad Maia (born 1996)

== Volleyball ==
- Amauri (born 1959)
- Anderson (born 1974)
- André Heller (born 1975)
- André Nascimento (born 1979)
- Bebeto de Freitas (born 1950)
- Bernard (born 1957)
- Bernardinho (born 1959)
- Carlão (born 1965)
- Dante (born 1980)
- Fofão (born 1970)
- Giba (born 1976)
- Giovane (born 1970)
- Gustavo (born 1975)
- Jaque (born 1983)
- Marcelo Negrão (born 1972)
- Maurício Lima (born 1968)
- Montanaro (born 1958)
- Murilo (born 1981)
- Nalbert (born 1974)
- Paula Pequeno (born 1982)
- Renan (born 1960)
- Ricardinho (born 1975)
- Serginho (born 1975)
- Sheilla (born 1983)
- Tande (born 1970)
- Virna (born 1971)
- William (born 1954)
