= Swimming at the 1951 Pan American Games =

Swimming at the 1st Pan American Games took place February 26-March 7, 1951, in Buenos Aires, Argentina. Preliminary heats were held February 26–28, with final heats being swum on March 2, 4, 6 and 7.

== Results ==
=== Men's events ===
| Event | Gold | | Silver | | Bronze | |
|---|---|---|---|---|---|---|
| 100 m Freestyle | Dick Cleveland; United States | 58.8 | Ronald Gora; United States | 59.5 | Nicasio Silverio; Cuba | 1:00.1 |
| 400 m Freestyle | Tetsuo Okamoto; Brazil | 4:52.4 | Bill Heusner; United States | 4:54.5 | Tonatiuh Gutiérrez; Mexico | 4:57.2 |
| 1500 m Freestyle | Tetsuo Okamoto; Brazil | 19:23.3 | Tonatiuh Gutiérrez; Mexico | 19:24.5 | Efrén Fierro; Mexico | 19:57.4 |
| 100 m Backstroke | Allen Stack; United States | 1:08.0 | Pedro Galvão; Argentina | 1:08.3 | Burwell Jones; United States | 1:09.8 |
| 200 m Breaststroke | Héctor Domínguez; Argentina | 2:43.8 | Willy Otto Jordan; Brazil | 2:47.3 | Bowen Stassforth; United States | 2:47.6 |
| 4 × 200 m Freestyle Relay | United States; Ronald Gora; Burwell Jones; Dick Cleveland; Bill Heusner | 9:00.6 | Brazil; Ricardo Capanema; Aram Boghossian; João Gonçalves Filho; Tetsuo Okamoto | 9:13.0 | Argentina; Pedro Galvão; Carlos Alberto Bonacich; Jorge Vogt; César Guardo | 9:19.5 |
| 3 × 100 m Medley Relay | United States; Allen Stack; Bowen Stassforth; Dick Cleveland | 3:16.9 | Argentina; Pedro Galvão; Orlando Cossani; César Guardo | 3:20.7 | Mexico; Alberto Isaac; Clemente Mejía; Luis Spamer | 3:22.5 |

=== Women's events ===
| Event | Gold | | Silver | | Bronze | |
|---|---|---|---|---|---|---|
| 100 m Freestyle | Sharon Geary; United States | 1:08:4 | Jackie LaVine; United States | 1:09.9 | Ana María Schultz; Argentina | 1:10.7 |
| 200 m Freestyle | Ana María Schultz; Argentina | 2:32.4 | Betty Brey; United States | 2:33.3 | Eileen Holt; Argentina | 2:36.5 |
| 400 m Freestyle | Ana María Schultz; Argentina | 5:26.7 | Carolyn Green; United States | 5:33.1 | Piedade Coutinho; Brazil | 5:33.6 |
| 100 m Backstroke | Maureen O'Brien; United States | 1:18.5 | Sheila Donahue; United States | 1:20.5 | Magda Bruggemann; Mexico | 1:21.4 |
| 200 m Breaststroke | Dorotea Turnbull; Argentina | 3:08.4 | Beatriz Rohde; Argentina | 3:10.3 | Carol Pence; United States | 3:14.7 |
| 4 × 100 m Freestyle Relay | United States; Carolyn Green; Sharon Geary; Jackie LaVine; Betty Brey | 4:37.1 | Argentina; Ana María Schultz; Eileen Holt; Cristina Kujath; Emma Gondona | 4:48.1 | Brazil; Talita Rodrigues; Idamis Busin; Ana Lucia Santa Rita; Piedade Coutinho | 5:03.6 |
| 3 × 100 m Medley Relay | United States; Sharon Geary; Carol Pence; Maureen O'Brien | 3:49.3 | Argentina; Ana María Schultz; Nélida I. Del Roscio; Aurora Otero Rey | 3:59.7 | Mexico; Magda Bruggemann; Charlotte Knapp; Adriana Hernández | 4:13.2 |

== Medal table ==
| Rank | Nation | Gold | Silver | Bronze | Total |
|---|---|---|---|---|---|
| 1 | United States | 8 | 6 | 3 | 17 |
| 2 | Argentina | 4 | 5 | 3 | 12 |
| 3 | Brazil | 2 | 2 | 2 | 6 |
| 4 | Mexico | 0 | 1 | 5 | 6 |
| 5 | Cuba | 0 | 0 | 1 | 1 |
| Totals (5 entries) | | 14 | 14 | 14 | 42 |
