= Lucio Grotone =

Brazilian boxer (1928–2017)

Personal information
- Born: 9 November 1928 Santos, São Paulo, Brazil
- Died: 20 March 2017 (aged 88) Santos, São Paulo, Brazil

Sport
- Sport: Boxing
Medal record
Men's amateur boxing
Representing Brazil
Pan American Games
Silver medal – second place	1951 Buenos Aires	Light heavyweight

Lucio Grotone (9 November 1928 – 20 March 2017) was a Brazilian boxer. He competed in the men's light heavyweight event at the 1952 Summer Olympics.

Lúcio Grottone, with Sicilian ancestry, began boxing as a teenager. He achieved the light heavyweight championship of São Paulo in 1950 and later secured the Brazilian title the same year. In 1951, he repeated these triumphs and earned a silver medal at the first Pan American Games in Buenos Aires. Though eliminated in the quarter-finals at the 1952 Olympics, he retired from boxing in 1954. Grottone then focused on his wife's family fishing business but remained active as a referee and boxing administrator. In July 2016, he proudly participated in the torch relay for the Rio Olympics, carrying the torch in his wheelchair.
