= Samuel Schemberg =

Brazilian water polo player

Personal information
- Born: 23 July 1925; Rio de Janeiro, Brazil
- Died: 11 July 2005 (aged 79)

Sport
- Sport: Water polo

Samuel Schemberg (23 July 1925 – 11 July 2005) was a Brazilian water polo player. He competed in the men's tournament at the 1952 Summer Olympics.
