= Dominican Postal Institute =

Coordinates: 18.428617°N 69.98267°W

Instituto Postal Dominicano (INPOSDOM)
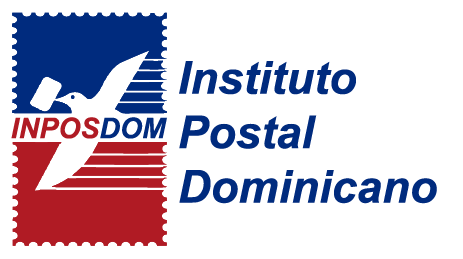
- Company type: State-owned enterprise
- Industry: Postal service; Courier
- Founded: November 15, 1985; 40 years ago
- Headquarters: C/ Héroes de Luperón esq. Rafael Damirón, Centro de Los Héroes, Código Postal 10101
- Key people: Erick Alberto Michael Guzman Nuñez (CEO)
- Dominican Postal Institute

Corporation overview
- Minister responsible: Eduardo Estrella, Ministry of Public Works and Communications
- Website: www.inposdom.gob.do

The Dominican Postal Institute (Spanish: Instituto Postal Dominicano, INPOSDOM) is the Dominican institution charged with postal services for the Dominican Republic. It was established on November 15, 1985, by Law 307.

Apart from postal services, INPOSDOM offers email services for all citizens of the Dominican Republic.

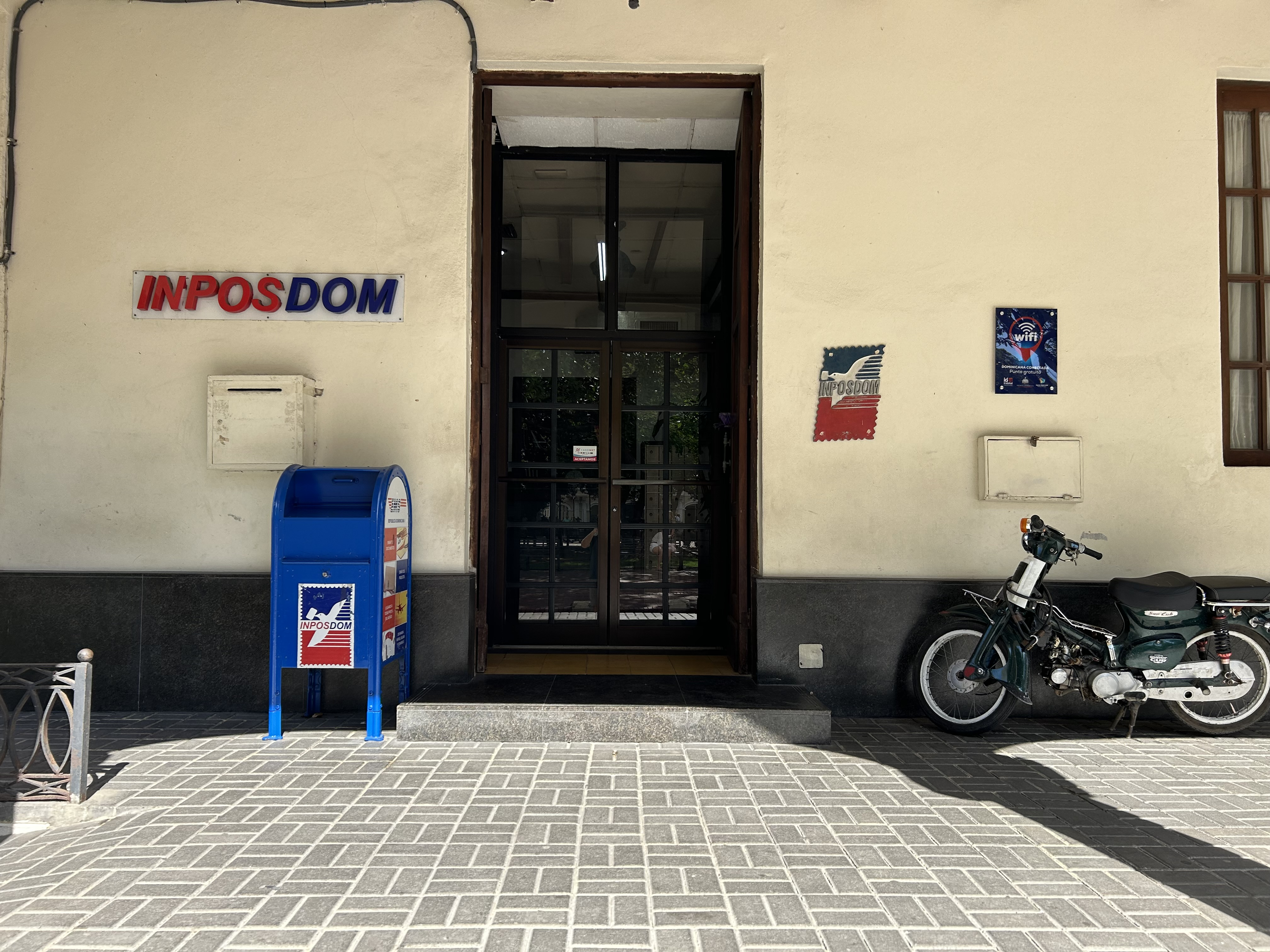
INPOSDOM post office in the historical quarter of Santo Domingo.
