= Rosslyn Range =

American long jumper (1933–2021)

Rosslyn Roy Range (November 29, 1933 – May 28, 2021) was an American long jumper who competed in the 1950s. Range set his personal best in the men's long jump event (8.03 metres) on March 14, 1955, at the 1955 Pan American Games. He died on May 28, 2021, at the age of 87.

== Achievements ==
Year	Tournament	Venue	Result	Event
1955	Pan American Games	Mexico City, Mexico	1st	Long Jump
1956	US National Championships	Bakersfield, California	5th	Long Jump

== Sources ==
- Profile
