= Gladys Baldwin =

Peruvian sports shooter

Personal information
- Born: Gladys Baldwin López; 18 September 1937 Callao, Peru
- Died: 5 July 1982 (aged 44)

Sport
- Sport: Sports shooting

Gladys Baldwin (18 September 1937 – 5 July 1982) was a Peruvian sports shooter. She competed at the 1968 Summer Olympics and the 1972 Summer Olympics. Along with Eulalia Rolińska (Poland) and Nuria Ortíz (Mexico) she was one of three women to compete in the shooting events at the 1968 Olympics.
