= Gladys de Seminario =

Peruvian sports shooter

Personal information
- Nationality: Peruvian
- Born: 4 March 1966 (age 59)

Sport
- Sport: Sports shooting

Gladys de Seminario (born 4 March 1966) is a Peruvian sports shooter. She competed in the women's 50 metre rifle three positions event at the 1984 Summer Olympics.
