= Allan Sobocinski =

Brazilian sports shooter (1931–2023)

Personal information
- Born: 12 December 1931 São Paulo, Brazil
- Died: 9 May 2023 (aged 91) Curitiba, Brazil

Sport
- Sport: Sports shooting

Allan Sobocinski (12 December 1931 – 9 May 2023) was a Brazilian sports shooter. He competed in the 25 m pistol event at the 1948 Summer Olympics. He placed 56th. Sobocinski died in Curitiba on 9 May 2023, at the age of 91.
