= Tetsuo Okamoto =

Brazilian swimmer (1932–2007)

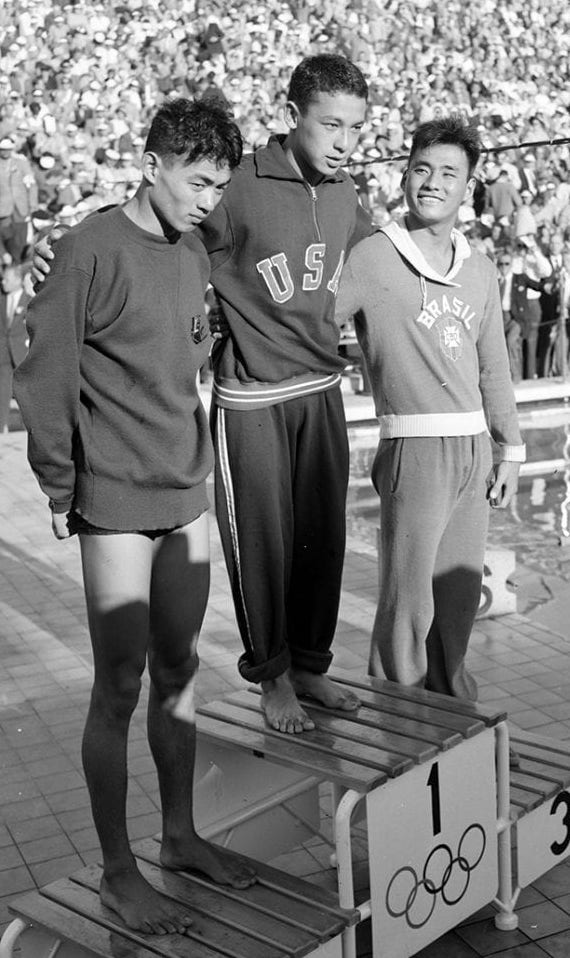
- Okamoto (right) at the 1952 Olympics

Personal information
- National team: Brazil
- Born: 20 March 1932 Marília, São Paulo, Brazil
- Died: 1 October 2007 (aged 75) Marília, São Paulo, Brazil

Sport
- Sport: Swimming
- Strokes: Freestyle
Medal record
Men's swimming
Representing Brazil
Olympic Games
Bronze medal – third place	1952 Helsinki	1500 m freestyle
Pan American Games
Gold medal – first place	1951 Buenos Aires	400 m freestyle
Gold medal – first place	1951 Buenos Aires	1500 m freestyle
Silver medal – second place	1951 Buenos Aires	4 x 200 m freestyle

Tetsuo Okamoto (20 March 1932 – 1 October 2007) was a Brazilian Olympic swimmer.

== Early life ==
Okamoto had asthma, and began to swim to treat it at 7 years old. However, it was only when he was 15 years old, and the coach Fausto Alonso arrived to form a serious team in Yara Clube in Marília, that Tetsuo began to train in a good pool under the guidance of someone with knowledge of swimming. At that time, his training was only 2000 metres daily.

== Career ==
By early 1949, aged 17, Tetsuo had climbed several positions in the Brazilian national ranking, and entered the South American Championship in Montevideo, his first international competition. There, he swam the three long-distance races, reaching the finals of the 400-metre and 1500-metre freestyle. However, an event at the turn of the decade was a watershed in his swimming career.

In 1949, a Japanese team (the 'Flying Fish') toured Brazil, and competed in Marília with excellent results, including victories over the Americans. Okamoto was fascinated with these swimmers and received the following advice: "if you want to have good results, you must train a lot more: 10,000 metres daily". Thus, his training changed drastically. Although the pool was unheated and he did not have goggles, Okamoto faced the cold and came out with eyes stinging with the chlorine, but carried out this routine.

At the Brazilian Championship in 1950, he became champion for the first time, and his popularity and recognition began to grow. In January 1951, he became the South American record holder for the first time. He swam the 1500-metre freestyle in 19:24.3, breaking the Brazilian record by 40 seconds and the South American record by 13 seconds.

At the inaugural Pan American Games in 1951, in Buenos Aires, Argentina, he claimed two gold medals in the 400-metre and 1500-metre freestyle, and one silver medal in the 4×200-metre freestyle. In the 1500-metre freestyle, he broke his own South American record.

When he returned from Buenos Aires to Brazil, Okamoto received a big party in his hometown, Marília. There was a procession in an open car, and awards to the new Brazilian hero. At the same time, however, thieves robbed his house, taking several belongings.

Three weeks after the Pan, he broke the South American record for 400-metre freestyle with 4:41.5, which had never before been in the hands of a Brazilian.

At the South American Championship in Lima, Peru, in March 1952, Tetsuo won the gold medal in the 400-metre, 800-metre and 1500-metre freestyle.

He was a bronze medalist at the 1952 Summer Olympics in Helsinki (1500-metre freestyle), the first Brazilian swimmer to win a medal at the Olympics. Tetsuo won his heat with a time of 19:05.6, another new South American record and in the final won the bronze medal with a further South American record of 18:51.3 that would last ten years.

== After swimming ==
After leaving swimming, Okamoto moved to the United States for several years, where he studied geology and business administration and started a company drilling artesian wells.

He died in his city of birth, Marília, on 1 October 2007, due to heart and respiratory failure, caused by long-standing kidney problems which forced him to have frequent hemodialysis in the last years of his life.
