= 1951 Pan American Games =

1st edition of the Pan American Games

I Pan American Games
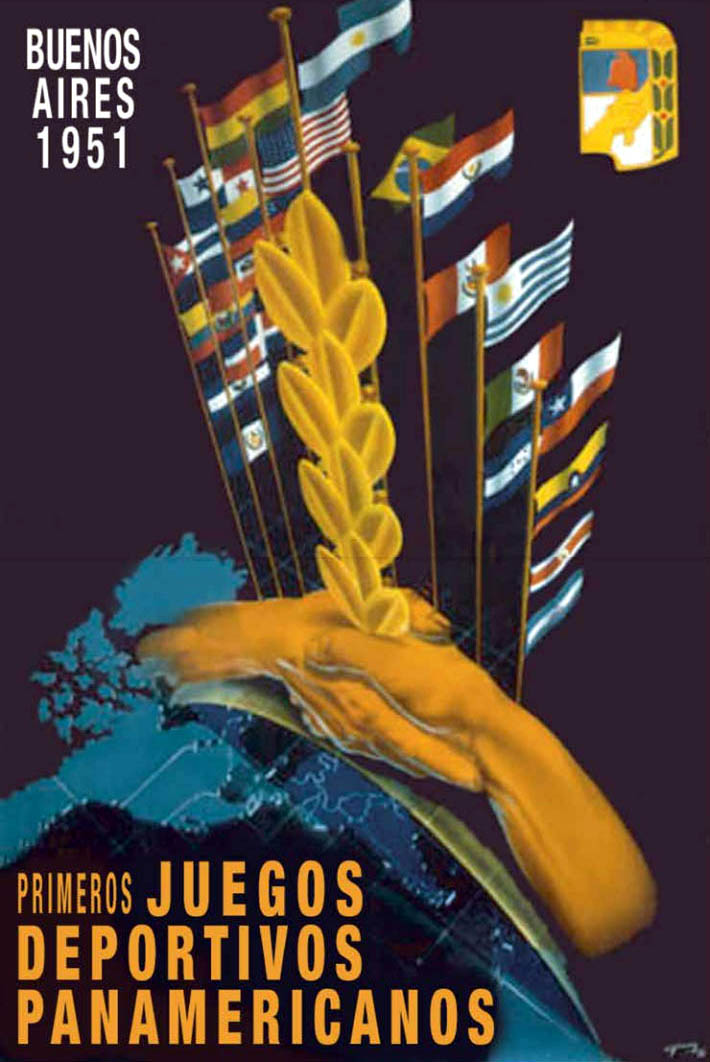
- Host: Buenos Aires, Argentina
- Nations: 21
- Athletes: 2,513
- Events: 140 in 18 sports
- Opening: February 25
- Closing: March 9
- Opened by: President Juan Perón
- Main venue: Racing Club Stadium

The 1951 Pan American Games, officially known as I Pan American Games (Spanish: I Juegos Panamericanos) and commonly known as Buenos Aires 1951, were held in Buenos Aires, Argentina between February 25 and March 9, 1951. The Pan American Games' origins were at the Games of the X Olympiad in Los Angeles, United States, where officials representing the National Olympic Committees of the Americas discussed the staging of an Olympic-style regional athletic competition for the athletes of the Americas.

During the Pan-American Exposition at Dallas, United States, in 1937, a limited sports program was staged. These included athletics, boxing and wrestling, among others. This program was considered a success and a meeting of Olympic officials from the Americas was held.

At the Pan American Sports Conference held in 1940, it was decided to hold the 1st Pan American Games at Buenos Aires, Argentina, in 1942. The Pan American Sports Committee was formed to govern the games. Avery Brundage was elected as the first President. However, the Japanese attack on Pearl Harbor brought much of the Americas into World War II, thus forcing the cancellation of the 1942 games.

A second conference was held in 1948. Avery Brundage was re-elected as the president of the PASC. It was decided that Buenos Aires would still host the 1st Pan American Games, this time in 1951.

== Venues ==
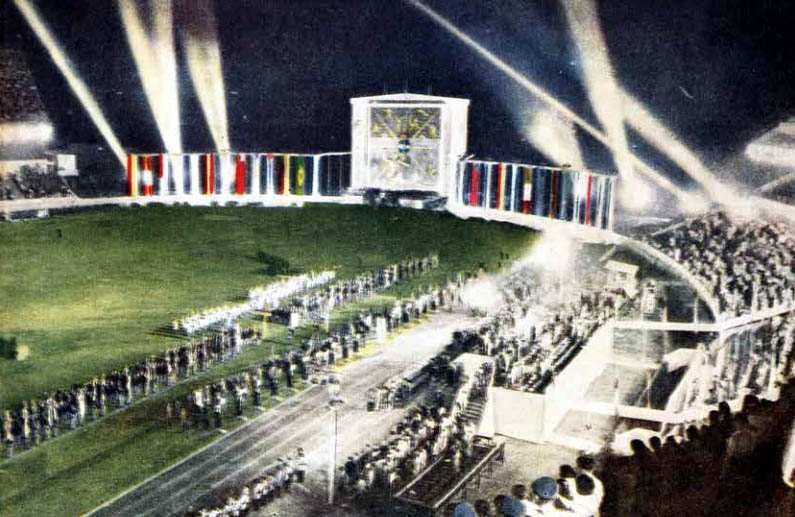
River Plate stadium (venue for athletics competitions) during the closing ceremony

Venue	Event / sport(s)	Ref.
Avenida General Paz	Marathon (men's)	
CUBA outdoor natatorium (Note: The swimming pools had been expropriated by the government led by Juan Perón.)	Diving; Swimming; Waterpolo	
Dársena Sud	Rowing	
Luna Park Stadium	Basketball; Boxing	
Club Pucará	Baseball	
Racing Club Stadium	Opening ceremony Football	
River Plate Stadium	Athletics; Closure ceremony	
Velódromo Municipal	Cycling	

The Military College of Campo de Mayo was the Pan American village for men athletes, while several venues in Buenos Aires were used as women's villages. The Argentine athletes did not stay with the rest of competitors so they were hosted in Ezeiza and San Fernando.

== Opening ceremony ==
The opening ceremony took place at the Racing Stadium, which had been recently inaugurated. The Greek athlete Aristeidis Roubanis lit the pebble for the first time, while local athlete Delfo Cabrera was the bearer of the Argentine flag.

The inauguration event was attended by the Argentine President Juan Perón and the member of the Pan-American Games Commission, Avery Brundage.

== Medal count ==
* Host nation (Argentina)

Rank	NOC	Gold	Silver	Bronze	Total
1	Argentina*	63	43	36	142
2	United States	46	34	21	101
3	Chile	8	19	12	39
4	Cuba	6	7	8	21
5	Brazil	5	15	13	33
6	Mexico	5	7	23	35
7	Peru	2	5	7	14
8	Trinidad and Tobago	1	2	0	3
9	Ecuador	1	0	1	2
10	Colombia	1	0	0	1
Totals (10 entries)		138	132	121	391

== Sports ==
- Athletics
- Baseball
- Basketball
- Boxing
- Cycling
- Diving
- Equestrian
- Fencing
- Football
- Gymnastics
- Modern pentathlon
- Polo
- Rowing
- Sailing
- Shooting
- Swimming
- Tennis
- Water polo
- Weightlifting
- Wrestling

Preceded by	I Pan American Games; Buenos Aires (1951)	Succeeded by Mexico City
