= 1962 Ibero-American Games – Results =

These are the results of the 1962 Ibero-American Games which took place at the Estadio de Vallehermoso in Madrid, Spain, between 7 and 12 October.

== Men's results ==
=== 100 metres ===
Heats – 7 October

Rank	Heat	Name	Nationality	Time	Notes
1	1	Horacio Esteves	Venezuela	10.9	Q
2	1	Joe Satow	Brazil	11.1	Q
3	1	Gerardo Di Tolla	Peru	11.1	Q
4	1	Julio Vélez	Ecuador	11.3	
5	1	Miguel Guegara	Costa Rica	11.3	
1	2	Rafael Romero	Venezuela	10.7	Q
2	2	Leonel Pedroza	Colombia	11.0	Q
3	2	Juan Enrique Byers	Chile	11.1	Q
4	2	António Faria	Portugal	11.1	
5	2	Leonel Midi	Dominican Republic	11.3	
1	3	Luis Vienna	Argentina	10.9	Q
2	3	Manuel Montalvo	Cuba	11.0	Q
3	3	Óscar López	El Salvador	11.1	Q
1	4	Noel Mangual	Puerto Rico	11.0	Q
2	4	Rodobaldo Díaz	Cuba	11.0	Q
3	4	José Santos	Portugal	11.3	Q
4	4	Benito Morales	Paraguay	11.3	
1	5	Manuel Rivera	Puerto Rico	10.9	Q
2	5	Alberto Torres	Dominican Republic	10.9	Q
3	5	Melanio Asensio	Spain	11.2	Q
4	5	Miguel González	Peru	11.2	
1	6	Affonso da Silva	Brazil	10.8	Q
2	6	Iván Moreno	Chile	10.8	Q
3	6	Rogelio Rivas	Spain	10.9	Q
4	6	Juan Alberto Bagnoli	Argentina	11.0	
5	6	Carlos Pfeller	Uruguay	11.4	

Semifinals – 8 October

Rank	Heat	Name	Nationality	Time	Notes
1	1	Rafael Romero	Venezuela	10.6	Q
2	1	Noel Mangual	Puerto Rico	10.8	Q
3	1	Iván Moreno	Chile	11.0	
4	1	Manuel Montalvo	Cuba	11.0	
5	1	Melanio Asensio	Spain	11.0	
	1	Óscar López	El Salvador	DQ	
1	2	Joe Satow	Brazil	10.8	Q
2	2	Manuel Rivera	Puerto Rico	10.8	Q
3	2	Alberto Torres	Dominican Republic	11.1	
4	2	José Santos	Portugal	11.1	
	2	Luis Vienna	Argentina	DQ	
	2	Leonel Pedroza	Colombia	DQ	
1	3	Affonso da Silva	Brazil	10.8	Q
2	3	Rogelio Rivas	Spain	10.9	Q
3	3	Juan Enrique Byers	Chile	11.0	
4	3	Gerardo Di Tolla	Peru	11.0	
5	3	Rodobaldo Díaz	Cuba	11.0	
6	3	Horacio Esteves	Venezuela	12.4	

Final – 9 October

Rank	Name	Nationality	Time	Notes
1st place, gold medalist(s)	Rafael Romero	Venezuela	10.6	
2nd place, silver medalist(s)	Manuel Rivera	Puerto Rico	10.9	
3rd place, bronze medalist(s)	Affonso da Silva	Brazil	11.1	
4	Noel Mangual	Puerto Rico	11.1	
5	Rogelio Rivas	Spain	11.1	
6	Joe Satow	Brazil	11.1	

=== 200 metres ===
Heats – 10 October

Rank	Heat	Name	Nationality	Time	Notes
1	1	Manuel Rivera	Puerto Rico	22.1	Q
2	1	Alberto Torres	Dominican Republic	22.3	Q
3	1	Mário Paiva	Portugal	22.7	Q
4	1	Julio Vélez	Ecuador	22.7	
1	2	Luis Vienna	Argentina	21.7	Q
2	2	Rodobaldo Díaz	Cuba	22.3	Q
3	2	Miguel González	Peru	22.6	Q
4	2	Alberto Keitel	Chile	27.7	
1	3	Joel Costa	Brazil	22.0	Q
2	3	Manuel Montalvo	Cuba	22.0	Q
3	3	António Faria	Portugal	22.3	Q
4	3	José Luis Albarrán	Spain	22.9	
1	4	Arquímides Herrera	Venezuela	21.7	Q
2	4	José Luis Sánchez Paraíso	Spain	22.4	Q
3	4	Gerardo Di Tolla	Peru	22.4	Q
4	4	Eustace Bryce	Costa Rica	23.2	
1	5	Rafael Romero	Venezuela	21.8	Q
2	5	Juan Enrique Byers	Chile	22.5	Q
3	5	Juan Alberto Bagnoli	Argentina	22.8	Q
1	6	Noel Mangual	Puerto Rico	22.2	Q
2	6	Affonso da Silva	Brazil	22.5	Q
3	6	Óscar López	El Salvador	22.5	Q
4	6	Benito Morales	Paraguay	23.0	

Semifinals – 10 October

Rank	Heat	Name	Nationality	Time	Notes
1	1	Arquímides Herrera	Venezuela	21.7	Q
2	1	Manuel Rivera	Puerto Rico	21.8	Q
3	1	Manuel Montalvo	Cuba	22.3	
4	1	Affonso da Silva	Brazil	22.6	
5	1	Juan Alberto Bagnoli	Argentina	22.7	
6	1	Alberto Torres	Dominican Republic	22.7	
1	2	Luis Vienna	Argentina	21.8	Q
2	2	Joel Costa	Brazil	22.2	Q
3	2	Noel Mangual	Puerto Rico	22.3	
4	2	Gerardo Di Tolla	Peru	22.5	
5	2	Rodobaldo Díaz	Cuba	22.7	
6	2	Mário Paiva	Portugal	22.7	
1	3	Rafael Romero	Venezuela	21.4	Q
2	3	António Faria	Portugal	22.4	Q
3	3	José Luis Sánchez Paraíso	Spain	22.4	
4	3	Óscar López	El Salvador	22.7	
5	3	Juan Enrique Byers	Chile	22.8	
6	3	Miguel González	Peru	22.9	

Final – 11 October

Rank	Name	Nationality	Time	Notes
1st place, gold medalist(s)	Rafael Romero	Venezuela	21.1	
2nd place, silver medalist(s)	Luis Vienna	Argentina	21.4	
3rd place, bronze medalist(s)	Arquímides Herrera	Venezuela	21.6	
4	Manuel Rivera	Puerto Rico	21.7	
5	Joel Costa	Brazil	22.0	
6	António Faria	Portugal	22.0	

=== 400 metres ===
Heats – 8 October

Rank	Heat	Name	Nationality	Time	Notes
1	1	Juan Francisco Aguilar	Uruguay	48.4	Q
2	1	Hortensio Fucil	Venezuela	49.4	Q
3	1	Valentim Baptista	Portugal	49.5	Q
4	1	Joel Rocha	Brazil	50.0	
1	2	Pablo Cano	Spain	49.3	Q
2	2	Juan Carlos Dyrzka	Argentina	49.6	Q
3	2	José da Silva	Portugal	49.6	Q
4	2	Carlos Pfeller	Uruguay	49.9	
1	3	Gilberto Faberlle	Puerto Rico	49.3	Q
2	3	José Manuel Álvarez	Spain	49.6	Q
3	3	Anubes da Silva	Brazil	50.0	Q
4	3	Juan Santiago Gordón	Chile	50.2	
5	3	Eustace Bryce	Costa Rica	56.5	
1	4	Germán Guenard	Puerto Rico	48.2	Q
2	4	Roberto Gómez	Cuba	49.8	Q
3	4	Raúl Zabala	Argentina	50.3	Q
4	4	Salomón Cáceres	Paraguay	53.8	

Semifinals – 10 October

Rank	Heat	Name	Nationality	Time	Notes
1	1	Juan Francisco Aguilar	Uruguay	48.2	Q
2	1	Gilberto Faberlle	Puerto Rico	49.1	Q
3	1	José Manuel Álvarez	Spain	49.5	Q
4	1	Hortensio Fucil	Venezuela	50.4	
5	1	Raúl Zabala	Argentina	50.4	
6	1	José da Silva	Portugal	50.8	
1	2	Juan Carlos Dyrzka	Argentina	47.7	Q
2	2	Germán Guenard	Puerto Rico	47.8	Q
3	2	Valentim Baptista	Portugal	48.6	Q
4	2	Pablo Cano	Spain	48.7	
5	2	Anubes da Silva	Brazil	49.2	
6	2	Roberto Gómez	Cuba	49.8	

Final – 12 October

Rank	Name	Nationality	Time	Notes
1st place, gold medalist(s)	Germán Guenard	Puerto Rico	47.3	
2nd place, silver medalist(s)	Juan Carlos Dyrzka	Argentina	48.1	
3rd place, bronze medalist(s)	Juan Francisco Aguilar	Uruguay	48.3	
4	Valentim Baptista	Portugal	48.9	
5	Gilberto Faberlle	Puerto Rico	57.2	
5	José Manuel Álvarez	Spain	59.1	

=== 800 metres ===
Heats – 7 October

Rank	Heat	Name	Nationality	Time	Notes
1	1	José Luis Martínez	Spain	1:52.7	Q
2	1	Leslie Mentor	Venezuela	1:53.4	Q
3	1	Alejandro Arroyo	Ecuador	1:55.6	Q
4	1	Rafael Melo	Colombia	1:56.0	Q
5	1	Augusto Vilela	Portugal	1:57.0	
6	1	Waldemar Montezano	Brazil	2:03.0	
7	1	Alfredo Cubero	Costa Rica	2:12.0	
1	2	Alberto Esteban	Spain	1:51.9	Q
2	2	Rogêrio Gonçalves	Portugal	1:52.5	Q
3	2	Julio León	Chile	1:52.5	Q
4	2	José Gregorio Neira	Colombia	1:52.6	Q
5	2	Paulo Araújo	Brazil	1:55.0	
6	2	Eduardo Balducci	Argentina	1:55.9	
7	2	Salomón Cáceres	Paraguay	2:01.4	

Final – 9 October

Rank	Name	Nationality	Time	Notes
1st place, gold medalist(s)	Alberto Esteban	Spain	1:50.2	
2nd place, silver medalist(s)	José Luis Martínez	Spain	1:50.5	
3rd place, bronze medalist(s)	José Gregorio Neira	Colombia	1:50.7	
4	Julio León	Chile	1:51.0	
5	Leslie Mentor	Venezuela	1:51.3	
6	Rogêrio Gonçalves	Portugal	1:53.3	
7	Rafael Melo	Colombia	1:55.0	
8	Alejandro Arroyo	Ecuador	1:57.8	

=== 1500 metres ===
12 October

Rank	Name	Nationality	Time	Notes
1st place, gold medalist(s)	Manuel de Oliveira	Portugal	3:52.7	
2nd place, silver medalist(s)	Tomás Barris	Spain	3:53.4	
3rd place, bronze medalist(s)	Osvaldo Suárez	Argentina	3:53.4	
4	José Gregorio Neira	Colombia	3:53.5	
5	Alberto Esteban	Spain	3:55.2	
6	Harvey Borrero	Colombia	3:55.4	
7	Eduardo Balducci	Argentina	4:01.6	
8	Sebastião Mendes	Brazil	4:02.5	
9	Joaquim Ferreira	Portugal	4:13.4	
10	Alejandro Arroyo	Ecuador	4:14.4	
11	Paulo Araújo	Brazil	4:15.5	

=== 5000 metres ===
9 October

Rank	Name	Nationality	Time	Notes
1st place, gold medalist(s)	Osvaldo Suárez	Argentina	14:31.6	
2nd place, silver medalist(s)	Manuel de Oliveira	Portugal	14:32.4	
3rd place, bronze medalist(s)	Mariano Haro	Spain	14:38.2	
4	Domingo Amaizón	Argentina	14:44.6	
5	Fernando Aguilar	Spain	14:53.6	
6	Manuel Marques	Portugal	15:29.2	
7	Albertino Etchechurry	Uruguay	15:45.0	
8	Armin Osswald	Chile	16:34.0	
9	Óscar González	Costa Rica	16:49.0	
10	Efraín Cordero	El Salvador	17:44.0	
	Ernesto Lazcano	Paraguay	NT	

=== 10,000 metres ===
7 October

Rank	Name	Nationality	Time	Notes
1st place, gold medalist(s)	Osvaldo Suárez	Argentina	30:14.2	
2nd place, silver medalist(s)	Mariano Haro	Spain	30:22.4	
3rd place, bronze medalist(s)	Carlos Pérez	Spain	30:57.6	
4	Armando Aldegalega	Portugal	31:34.8	
5	Alberto Ríos	Argentina	31:38.8	
6	Manuel Marques	Portugal	31:43.8	
7	Ricardo Vidal	Chile	31:59.8	
8	Armando Terán	Ecuador	33:39.2	
9	Ernesto Lezcano	Paraguay	35:17.8	
	Armando Pissarra	Brazil	NT	
	Albertino Etchechurry	Uruguay	NT	

=== Marathon ===
12 October

Rank	Name	Nationality	Time	Notes
1st place, gold medalist(s)	Armando Aldegealega	Portugal	2:30:09	
2nd place, silver medalist(s)	Álvaro Conde	Portugal	2:32:18	
3rd place, bronze medalist(s)	Jaime Guixa	Spain	2:32:54	
4	Mario Díaz	Argentina	2:37:56	
5	Sebastián Gracia	Guatemala	2:39:03	
6	Ricardo Vidal	Chile	2:40:07	
7	Alejandro Montaña	Bolivia	2:41:40	
8	Armando Terán	Ecuador	2:49:44	
9	Luciano Peinado	Peru	2:57:21	
10	Antonio Artaza	Argentina	3:00:34	
	Miguel Navarro	Spain	DNF	
	Francisco Allen	Chile	DNF	

=== 110 metres hurdles ===
Heats – 11 October

Rank	Heat	Name	Nationality	Time	Notes
1	1	José Telles da Conceição	Brazil	15.0	Q
2	1	Lancelot Bobb	Venezuela	15.1	Q
3	1	Arnaldo Bristol	Puerto Rico	15.5	
4	1	Juan Carlos Dyrzka	Argentina	15.5	
5	1	Irolán Echevarría	Cuba	16.2	
1	2	Guillermo Vallania	Argentina	15.0	Q
2	2	Emilio Campra	Spain	15.2	Q
3	2	Pedro de Almeida	Portugal	15.3	
4	2	Carlos Witting	Chile	15.6	
1	3	Carlos Mossa	Brazil	15.0	Q
2	3	Teófilo Davis Bell	Venezuela	15.2	Q
3	3	Heriberto Cruz	Puerto Rico	15.3	
4	3	Manuel Ufer	Spain	15.4	
5	3	Cumura Imboá	Portugal	15.8	
6	3	Luis Salazar	Ecuador	16.3	

Final – 12 October

Rank	Name	Nationality	Time	Notes
1st place, gold medalist(s)	José Telles da Conceição	Brazil	14.7	
2nd place, silver medalist(s)	Carlos Mossa	Brazil	14.8	
3rd place, bronze medalist(s)	Teófilo Davis Bell	Venezuela	14.9	
4	Lancelot Bobb	Venezuela	15.1	
5	Guillermo Vallania	Argentina	15.4	
6	Emilio Campra	Spain	15.4	

=== 400 metres hurdles ===
Heats – 10 October

Rank	Heat	Name	Nationality	Time	Notes
1	1	Juan Carlos Dyrzka	Argentina	52.3	Q
2	1	Anubes da Silva	Brazil	53.6	Q
3	1	José Cavero	Peru	53.9	
4	1	Cumura Imboá	Portugal	55.9	
5	1	Manuel Jordan	Chile	56.9	
1	2	Víctor Maldonado	Venezuela	54.1	Q
2	2	Ulisses dos Santos	Brazil	54.3	Q
3	2	Raúl Zabala	Argentina	54.6	
4	2	José Girbau	Spain	56.0	
1	3	Arístides Pineda	Venezuela	54.2	Q
2	3	Juan Montes	Puerto Rico	54.3	Q
3	3	Francisco Sainz	Spain	54.9	
4	3	Juan Santiago Gordón	Chile	55.7	

Final – 10 October

Rank	Name	Nationality	Time	Notes
1st place, gold medalist(s)	Juan Carlos Dyrzka	Argentina	50.9	
2nd place, silver medalist(s)	Víctor Maldonado	Venezuela	51.9	
3rd place, bronze medalist(s)	Anubes da Silva	Brazil	53.0	
4	Ulisses dos Santos	Brazil	54.2	
5	Arístides Pineda	Venezuela	55.0	
6	Juan Montes	Puerto Rico	55.8	

=== 3000 metres steeplechase ===
11 October

Rank	Name	Nationality	Time	Notes
1st place, gold medalist(s)	Domingo Amaizón	Argentina	9:02.6	
2nd place, silver medalist(s)	Manuel de Oliveira	Portugal	9:05.2	
3rd place, bronze medalist(s)	Sebastião Mendes	Brazil	9:16.4	
4	José Fernández	Spain	9:22.4	
5	Alberto Ríos	Argentina	9:28.0	
6	Francisco Allen	Chile	9:54.8	
7	Albertino Etchechurry	Uruguay	9:59.4	
	José Pereira	Portugal	NT	
	Efraín Cordero	El Salvador	NT	
	Manuel Alonso	Spain	DNF	

=== 4 × 100 metres relay ===
Heats – 10 October (Heats 1 and 2), 11 October (Heat 3)
Note: Heat 3 was the repetition of Heat 1, where after an appeal, the disqualification of the Venezuelan team was overturned. Only two teams participated in the rerun.

Rank	Heat	Nation	Competitors	Time	Notes
1	1	Argentina	Raúl Zabala, Carlos Biondi, Juan Alberto Bagnoli, Luis Vienna	~~42.2~~	
2	1	Cuba	Lázaro Betancourt, Irolán Echevarría, Manuel Montalvo, Rodobaldo Díaz	~~42.3~~	
3	1	Portugal	J. Soares, António Faria, J. Rocha, Mário Paiva	~~42.7~~	
	1	Venezuela	Arquímedes Herrera, Lloyd Murad, Andrés Fawre, Rafael Romero	~~DQ~~	
	1	Peru		~~DQ~~	
1	2	Brazil	Joe Satow, Joel Costa, Affonso da Silva, José Telles da Conceição	41.8	Q
2	2	Puerto Rico	Noel Mangual, Rubén Díaz, George Derieux, Manuel Rivera	41.9	Q
3	2	Spain	Rogelio Rivas, José Luis Sánchez Paraíso, José Rodríguez Quinteiro, Melanio Asensio	42.2	Q
4	2	Chile	Iván Moreno, Carlos Tornquist, Juan Santiago Gordón, Juan Enrique Byers	43.1	
	2	Dominican Republic		DQ	
1	3	Venezuela	Arquímedes Herrera, Lloyd Murad, Andrés Fawre, Rafael Romero	42.0	Q
2	3	Argentina	Raúl Zabala, Carlos Biondi, Juan Alberto Bagnoli, Luis Vienna	42.2	Q
	3	Cuba		DNS	
	3	Portugal		DNS	
	3	Peru		DNS	

Final – 12 October

Rank	Nation	Competitors	Time	Notes
1st place, gold medalist(s)	Brazil	Joe Satow, Joel Costa, Affonso da Silva, José Telles da Conceição	41.2	
2nd place, silver medalist(s)	Venezuela	Arquímedes Herrera, Lloyd Murad, Andrés Fawre, Rafael Romero	41.6	
3rd place, bronze medalist(s)	Argentina	Raúl Zabala, Carlos Biondi, Juan Alberto Bagnoli, Luis Vienna	41.6	
4	Spain	Rogelio Rivas, José Luis Sánchez Paraíso, José Rodríguez Quinteiro, Melanio Asensio	41.9	
5	Puerto Rico	Noel Mangual, Rubén Díaz, George Derieux, Manuel Rivera	42.7	

=== 4 × 400 metres relay ===
Heats – 9 October

Rank	Heat	Nation	Competitors	Time	Notes
1	1	Puerto Rico	Enrique Montalvo, José Luis Villalongo, Gilberto Faberlle, Germán Guenard	3:16.1	Q
2	1	Uruguay	Jorge Vilaboa, Víctor Gadea, Carlos Pfeller, Juan Francisco Aguilar	3:18.1	Q
3	1	Spain	José Manuel Álvarez, Jovino González, Roberto Sastre, Pablo Cano	3:18.2	Q
4	1	Argentina	Guillermo Vallania, Raúl Zabala, Juan Carlos Dyrzka, Luis Vienna	3:21.0	
5	1	Chile	Luis Meza, Juan Santiago Gordón, Manuel Jordan, Julio León	3:28.6	
1	1	Venezuela	Arístides Pineda, Lloyd Murad, Víctor Maldonado, Hortensio Fucil	3:25.2	Q
2	1	Portugal	Rogerio Gonçalves, Augusto Vilela, José da Silva, Valentim Baptista	3:42.5	Q
3	1	Brazil	Ulisses dos Santos, José Telles da Conceição, Joel Rocha, Anubes da Silva	3:42.6	Q

Final – 12 October

Rank	Nation	Competitors	Time	Notes
1st place, gold medalist(s)	Venezuela	Arístides Pineda, Lloyd Murad, Víctor Maldonado, Hortensio Fucil	3:15.4	
2nd place, silver medalist(s)	Puerto Rico	Enrique Montalvo, José Luis Villalongo, Gilberto Faberlle, Germán Guenard	3:16.4	
3rd place, bronze medalist(s)	Brazil	Ulisses dos Santos, José Telles da Conceição, Joel Rocha, Anubes da Silva	3:16.5	
4	Spain	José Manuel Álvarez, Jovino González, Roberto Sastre, Pablo Cano	3:18.6	
5	Uruguay	Jorge Vilaboa, Víctor Gadea, Carlos Pfeller, Juan Francisco Aguilar	3:21.0	
6	Portugal	Rogerio Gonçalves, Augusto Vilela, José da Silva, Valentim Baptista	3:22.0	

=== High jump ===
Qualification – 9 October

Rank	Name	Nationality	Result	Notes
1	Teodoro Flores	Guatemala	2.00	q
2	Roberto Abugattás	Peru	1.97	q
3	Júlio Fernandes	Portugal	1.94	q
4	Luis María Garriga	Spain	1.90	q
5	Eleuterio Fassi	Argentina	1.85	q
5	Carlos Vázquez	Puerto Rico	1.85	q
5	Horacio Martínez	Argentina	1.85	q
5	Juan Ignacio Ariño	Spain	1.85	q
5	Silvio Moreira	Brazil	1.85	q
10	Eugenio Velasco	Chile	1.80	q
11	Víctor Vigo	Puerto Rico	1.80	q
12	Ramón Bastardo	Venezuela	1.80	
13	Elio Andrade	Portugal	1.80	
14	Moisés Oharun	Peru	?	

Final – 11 October

Rank	Name	Nationality	1.80	1.85	1.90	1.94	1.97	2.00	2.05	Result	Notes
1st place, gold medalist(s)	Teodoro Flores	Guatemala	–	–	o	o	o	o	xxx	2.00	
2nd place, silver medalist(s)	Roberto Abugattás	Peru	–	–	o	xo	o	xxx		1.97	
3rd place, bronze medalist(s)	Júlio Fernandes	Portugal	o	o	o	o	xxx			1.94	
4	Luis María Garriga	Spain	o	o	xxo	xxx				1.90	
5	Horacio Martínez	Argentina	o	o	xxx					1.85	
5	Juan Ignacio Ariño	Spain	o	o	xxx					1.85	
5	Silvio Moreira	Brazil	o	o	xxx					1.85	
8	Carlos Vázquez	Puerto Rico	xo	o	xxx					1.85	
9	Eleuterio Fassi	Argentina	xo	xo	xxx					1.85	
	Víctor Vigo	Puerto Rico	xxx							NM	
	Eugenio Velasco	Chile	–	xxx						NM	

=== Pole vault ===
8 October

Rank	Name	Nationality	3.70	3.80	3.90	4.00	4.10	4.15	4.20	4.35	4.50	4.70	Result	Notes
1st place, gold medalist(s)	Rolando Cruz	Puerto Rico	–	–	–	o	o	–	xo	xxo	xxo	xx	4.50	
2nd place, silver medalist(s)	Rubén Cruz	Puerto Rico	–	–	–	o	o	o	o	xxx			4.20	
3rd place, bronze medalist(s)	Mario Eleusippi	Argentina	xo	o	xxo	o	xxo	xo	xxx				4.15	
4	Felipe Rodríguez	Spain	–	o	–	o	xo	–	xxx				4.10	
5	Miguel Consegal	Spain	–	o	–	xo	xo	xxx					4.10	
6	Luis Meza	Chile	–	o	o	xxo	xxx						4.00	
7	César Quintero	Colombia	xxo	xo	o	xxx							3.90	
8	Fernando Marques	Portugal	xo	xo	xxx								3.80	
9	Manuel dos Santos	Portugal											3.70	
9	Brígido Iriarte	Venezuela	xxo	xxx									3.70	

=== Long jump ===
Qualification – 10 October

Rank	Name	Nationality	Result	Notes
1	Luis Felipe Areta	Spain	7.17	q
2	Pedro de Almeida	Portugal	7.13	q
3	Ramón Bastardo	Venezuela	7.09	q
4	Carlos Tornquist	Chile	7.06	q
5	John Muñoz	Venezuela	7.05	q
6	Iván Moreno	Chile	7.03	q
7	Carlos Mossa	Brazil	7.03	q
8	Félix Antonetti	Puerto Rico	6.95	q
9	Júlio Fernandes	Portugal	6.94	q
10	Newton de Castro	Brazil	?.??	q
11	Fermín Donazar	Uruguay	6.68	
12	Víctor Hernández	Cuba	6.60	
13	Rigoberto Portillo	Paraguay	6.07	

Final – 10 October

Rank	Name	Nationality	#1	#2	#3	#4	#5	#6	Result	Notes
1st place, gold medalist(s)	Luis Felipe Areta	Spain	7.20	x	7.28	7.41	x	7.52	7.52	
2nd place, silver medalist(s)	Pedro de Almeida	Portugal	7.35	7.19	7.38	7.12	x	7.48	7.48	
3rd place, bronze medalist(s)	John Muñoz	Venezuela	6.92	6.97	7.31	7.33	7.14	x	7.33	
4	Júlio Fernandes	Portugal	7.23	7.31	7.13	x	7.23	x	7.31	
5	Newton de Castro	Brazil	7.15	7.16	7.16	7.01	6.87	6.97	7.16	
6	Ramón Bastardo	Venezuela	7.04	6.96	6.94	7.09	7.07	x	7.09	
7	Félix Antonetti	Puerto Rico	7.00	6.72	6.95				7.00	
8	Carlos Tornquist	Chile	x	6.96	6.98				6.98	
9	Carlos Mossa	Brazil	6.98	6.90	–				6.98	
10	Iván Moreno	Chile	6.60	x	x				6.60	

=== Triple jump ===
Qualification – 11 October

Rank	Name	Nationality	Result	Notes
1	Rumildo Cruz	Puerto Rico	14.46	q
2	Júlio Fernandes	Portugal	14.22	q
3	Víctor Hernández	Cuba	14.22	q
4	Alves Thomas	Venezuela	14.20	q
5	Rogêrio Seromenho	Portugal	14.14	q
6	Padro Camacho	Puerto Rico	14.12	q
7	Iván Moreno	Chile	14.11	q
8	Luis Felipe Areta	Spain	14.00	q
9	José López	Venezuela	13.96	q
10	Silvio Moreira	Brazil	13.95	q
11	Hugo Hernández	Uruguay	13.89	
12	Francisco Higuero	Spain	13.88	
	Carlos Vera	Chile	??.??	
	Julio Ibarreche	Argentina	??.??	
	Luis Huarcava	Peru	??.??	
	Ramón López	Cuba	DNS	

Final – 12 October

Rank	Name	Nationality	#1	#2	#3	#4	#5	#6	Result	Notes
1st place, gold medalist(s)	Luis Felipe Areta	Spain	15.03	14.95	x	13.40	14.82	15.07	15.07	
2nd place, silver medalist(s)	Rumildo Cruz	Puerto Rico	14.24	14.50	14.27	x	14.63	x	14.63	
3rd place, bronze medalist(s)	Víctor Hernández	Cuba	14.34	14.61	14.51	14.53	14.28	14.53	14.61	
4	Júlio Fernandes	Portugal	13.96	14.34	14.16	14.16	14.21	14.44	14.44	
5	Padro Camacho	Puerto Rico	14.31	14.08	13.70	13.67	x	13.21	14.41	
6	Silvio Moreira	Brazil	14.10	x	14.23	13.87	13.75	13.77	14.23	
7	Rogêrio Seromenho	Portugal	13.88	14.04	13.70				14.04	
8	Iván Moreno	Chile	14.01	13.90	x				14.01	
9	Alves Thomas	Venezuela	13.93	x	x				13.93	
10	José López	Venezuela	13.60	x	13.88				13.88	

=== Shot put ===
8 October

Rank	Name	Nationality	#1	#2	#3	#4	#5	#6	Result	Notes
1st place, gold medalist(s)	Enrique Helf	Argentina	15.99	15.54	15.74	15.24	16.06	x	16.06	
2nd place, silver medalist(s)	Luis Di Cursi	Argentina	15.83	15.83	15.96	14.71	15.66	14.70	15.96	
3rd place, bronze medalist(s)	Antonio Lamua	Spain	14.54	14.15	14.92	14.84	13.96	14.54	14.92	
4	Héctor Thomas	Venezuela	13.45	13.55	14.25	14.57	x	13.65	14.57	
5	Isolino Taborda	Brazil	14.04	x	13.88	14.56	x	13.35	14.56	
6	José Galvão	Portugal	x	13.06	14.31	13.31	14.05	13.36	14.31	
7	Bonifacio Allende	Spain	13.88	12.77	13.66				13.88	
8	Modesto Mederos	Cuba	12.72	12.93	12.19				12.93	

=== Discus throw ===
Qualification – 9 October

Rank	Name	Nationality	Result	Notes
1	Enrique Helf	Argentina	47.77	q
2	Héctor Menacho	Peru	47.09	q
3	Daniel Cereali	Venezuela	45.70	q
4	Dieter Gevert	Chile	45.24	q
5	Manuel Goulão	Portugal	45.20	q
6	Hernán Haddad	Chile	45.08	q
7	João Afonso	Portugal	44.95	q
8	Ignacio Reinosa	Puerto Rico	44.87	q
9	Dagoberto González	Colombia	44.77	q
10	Antonio Pares	Spain	44.03	
11	João Alexandre	Brazil	43.96	
12	Modesto Mederos	Cuba	43.68	
13	Alfonso Vidal-Quadras	Spain	43.49	
14	Walter Morandi	Uruguay	42.14	
15	Héctor Thomas	Venezuela	41.63	
16	Luis Di Cursi	Argentina	39.74	

Final – 9 October

Rank	Name	Nationality	#1	#2	#3	#4	#5	#6	Result	Notes
1st place, gold medalist(s)	Enrique Helf	Argentina	47.42	48.95	47.77	45.68	49.38	x	49.38	
2nd place, silver medalist(s)	Dieter Gevert	Chile	47.52	47.44	41.87	45.13	46.18	44.43	47.52	
3rd place, bronze medalist(s)	Ignacio Reinosa	Puerto Rico	46.95	34.79	44.63	46.12	x	47.00	47.00	
4	Manuel Goulão	Portugal	45.00	46.84	43.36	44.96	39.46	42.69	46.84	
5	Dagoberto González	Colombia	43.41	44.67	45.88	40.53	46.31	38.20	46.31	
6	Daniel Cereali	Venezuela	45.20	44.24	44.17	43.36	43.61	44.32	45.20	
7	Hernán Haddad	Chile	x	44.64	44.54				44.64	
8	João Afonso	Portugal	x	44.28	x				44.28	
9	Héctor Menacho	Peru	35.56	43.22	40.86				43.22	

=== Hammer throw ===
Qualification – 11 October

Rank	Name	Nationality	Result	Notes
1	Enrique Samuells	Cuba	55.00	q
2	Eduardo Alburquerque	Portugal	53.36	q
3	José María Elorriaga	Spain	52.64	q
4	Daniel Cereali	Venezuela	52.10	q
5	Bruno Stromeyer	Brazil	52.04	q
6	Carlos Marzo	Argentina	51.61	q
6	Marcelino Borrero	Colombia	51.61	q
8	Alejandro Díaz	Chile	51.24	q
9	Orlando Guaita	Chile	50.78	q
10	Roberto Chapchap	Brazil	50.44	q
11	José Alberto Vallejo	Argentina	50.05	q
12	José Luis Falcón	Spain	49.77	

Final – 11 October

Rank	Name	Nationality	#1	#2	#3	#4	#5	#6	Result	Notes
1st place, gold medalist(s)	Eduardo Alburquerque	Portugal	55.37	54.84	54.72	53.15	54.69	53.71	55.37	
2nd place, silver medalist(s)	José María Elorriaga	Spain	52.11	54.24	53.47	54.15	55.24	53.96	55.24	
3rd place, bronze medalist(s)	Enrique Samuells	Cuba	52.18	51.53	54.11	50.63	x	x	54.11	
4	Roberto Chapchap	Brazil	x	51.88	50.57	52.41	53.62	53.95	53.95	
5	Daniel Cereali	Venezuela	52.82	53.49	50.47	53.60	x	52.04	53.60	
6	José Alberto Vallejo	Argentina	51.99	53.12	52.41	51.51	52.48	x	53.12	
7	Carlos Marzo	Argentina	51.06	50.57	49.37				51.06	
8	Orlando Guaita	Chile	x	50.24	50.60				50.60	
9	Marcelino Borrero	Colombia	50.26	50.50	48.07				50.50	
10	Alejandro Díaz	Chile	50.22	x	48.52				50.22	
11	Bruno Stromeyer	Brazil	50.13	x	–				50.13	

=== Javelin throw ===
12 October – old model

Rank	Name	Nationality	#1	#2	#3	#4	#5	#6	Result	Notes
1st place, gold medalist(s)	Alfonso de Andrés	Spain	64.44	61.97	62.73	61.41	62.84	68.17	68.17	
2nd place, silver medalist(s)	Ricardo Heber	Argentina	62.72	65.36	x	64.39	59.77	61.13	65.36	
3rd place, bronze medalist(s)	Jesús Rodríguez	Venezuela	57.12	64.68	61.68	57.97	58.59	63.51	64.68	
4	Luis Zárate	Peru	x	54.04	61.00	x	x	54.97	61.00	
5	Julio Agostí	Spain	x	53.27	60.61	54.10	51.91	55.89	60.61	
6	Héctor Thomas	Venezuela	57.53	59.43	57.53	56.16	57.20	53.74	59.43	
7	Wilfredo Salgado	Puerto Rico	54.60	x	58.44				58.44	
8	Santinho das Neves	Portugal	x	53.88	56.15				56.15	

=== Decathlon ===
9–10 October – 1962 tables (1985 conversions given with *)

The highest mark recorded in each event is highlighted in yellow

Rank	Athlete	Nationality	100m	LJ	SP	HJ	400m	110m H	DT	PV	JT	1500m	Points	Conv.	Notes
1st place, gold medalist(s)	Héctor Thomas	Venezuela	11.1	7.00	14.46	1.80	52.1	16.7	40.79	3.80	60.64	5:13.8	6630	6802*	
2nd place, silver medalist(s)	Roberto Caravaca	Venezuela	11.8	7.00	12.09	1.80	49.2	17.3	34.12	3.40	51.14	4:26.0	6133	6489*	
3rd place, bronze medalist(s)	Cleomenes da Cunha	Brazil	11.8	6.65	10.95	1.75	50.7	15.9	36.18	3.50	57.23	4:48.6	6000	6388*	
4	Héctor González	Argentina	11.4	6.31	11.77	1.65	48.6	16.6	33.38	3.00	45.25	4:33.5	5670	6118*	
5	Bernardino Lombao	Spain	11.3	6.45	9.63	1.70	49.5	16.3	32.79	3.10	44.15	4:33.2	5606	6069*	
6	Manuel González	Spain	11.7	6.62	11.63	1.65	51.7	17.6	36.60	3.20	47.42	5:07.9	5204	5816*	
7	Juris Laipenieks	Chile	11.8	6.59	12.38	1.60	53.4	17.5	42.29	NM	44.74	DNF	4558	4884*	
7	Manuel dos Santos	Portugal	12.7	6.11	9.83	1.65	56.4	20.0	29.61	3.80	48.47	4:34.2	4535	5237*	
	Carlos Vera	Chile	11.4	?	–	–	–	–	–	–	–	–	DNF	–	
	Vilar Santos	Portugal	DNS	–	–	–	–	–	–	–	–	–	DNS	–	

== Women's results ==
=== 100 metres ===
Heats – 8 October

Rank	Heat	Name	Nationality	Time	Notes
1	1	Miguelina Cobián	Cuba	12.3	Q
2	1	Nancy Correa	Chile	12.3	Q
3	1	Erica da Silva	Brazil	12.4	Q
4	1	Marta Buongiorno	Argentina	12.6	
5	1	Dinorah González	Uruguay	12.9	
6	1	Maria Eulalia Mendes	Portugal	13.2	
1	2	Marisol Massot	Chile	12.5	Q
2	2	Margarita Formeiro	Argentina	12.5	Q
3	2	Wanda Moreira	Brazil	12.8	Q
4	2	Maria Fernanda Costa	Portugal	13.2	

Final – 9 October

Rank	Name	Nationality	Time	Notes
1st place, gold medalist(s)	Miguelina Cobián	Cuba	12.3	
2nd place, silver medalist(s)	Erica da Silva	Brazil	12.3	
3rd place, bronze medalist(s)	Nancy Correa	Chile	12.4	
4	Marisol Massot	Chile	12.8	
5	Wanda Moreira	Brazil	13.1	
	Margarita Formeiro	Argentina	DQ	

=== 200 metres ===
Heats – 11 October

Rank	Heat	Name	Nationality	Time	Notes
1	1	Miguelina Cobián	Cuba	25.2	Q
2	1	Erica da Silva	Brazil	25.3	Q
3	1	Ada Brener	Argentina	26.3	Q
4	1	Nancy Correa	Chile	26.3	
5	1	Maria Fernanda Costa	Portugal	27.7	
1	2	Marta Buongiorno	Argentina	26.4	Q
2	2	Gisela Vidal	Venezuela	26.9	Q
3	2	Maria Eulalia Mendes	Portugal	27.2	Q
4	2	Wanda Moreira	Brazil	27.2	
5	2	Carlota Ulloa	Chile	28.0	

Final – 11 October

Rank	Name	Nationality	Time	Notes
1st place, gold medalist(s)	Miguelina Cobián	Cuba	25.3	
2nd place, silver medalist(s)	Erica da Silva	Brazil	25.5	
3rd place, bronze medalist(s)	Ada Brener	Argentina	26.2	
4	Marta Buongiorno	Argentina	26.4	
5	Maria Eulalia Mendes	Portugal	26.8	
6	Gisela Vidal	Venezuela	27.0	

=== 80 metres hurdles ===
Heats – 11 October

Rank	Heat	Name	Nationality	Time	Notes
1	1	Leda dos Santos	Brazil	11.9	Q
2	1	Eliana Gaete	Chile	12.1	Q
3	1	Emilia Dyrzka	Argentina	12.2	Q
4	1	Gisela Vidal	Venezuela	12.6	
1	2	Graciela Paviotti	Argentina	11.7	Q
2	2	Wanda dos Santos	Brazil	11.9	Q
3	2	Concepción Portuondo	Cuba	12.1	Q
4	2	Marisol Massot	Chile	12.4	
5	2	Olga Catter	Peru	12.7	

Final – 11 October

Rank	Name	Nationality	Time	Notes
1st place, gold medalist(s)	Wanda dos Santos	Brazil	11.5	
2nd place, silver medalist(s)	Graciela Paviotti	Argentina	11.5	
3rd place, bronze medalist(s)	Leda dos Santos	Brazil	11.9	
4	Eliana Gaete	Chile	11.9	
5	Emilia Dyrzka	Argentina	12.0	
6	Concepción Portuondo	Cuba	12.1	

=== 4 × 100 metres relay ===
12 October

Rank	Nation	Competitors	Time	Notes
1st place, gold medalist(s)	Chile	Gloria Mund, Carlota Ulloa, Nancy Correa, Marisol Massot	48.7	
2nd place, silver medalist(s)	Argentina	Marta Buongiorno, Ada Brener, Emilia Dyrzka, Margarita Formeiro	48.9	
3rd place, bronze medalist(s)	Brazil	Wanda dos Santos, Wanda Moreira, Leda dos Santos, Erica da Silva	49.4	
4	Portugal	Maria Fernanda Costa, Lídia Faria, Maria Eulalia Mendes, Francelina Anacleto	51.2	

=== High jump ===
10 October

Rank	Name	Nationality	1.35	1.40	1.45	1.48	1.52	1.54	1.56	1.60	Result	Notes
1st place, gold medalist(s)	Aída dos Santos	Brazil	–	–	o	o	o	o	xo	xxx	1.56	
2nd place, silver medalist(s)	Maria Cipriano	Brazil	–	–	o	o	o	xxo	xxx		1.54	
3rd place, bronze medalist(s)	Smiliana Dezulovic	Chile	o	o	o	o	xxx				1.48	
4	Deonildes Martins	Uruguay	–	o	xxo	o	xxx				1.48	
5	Nelly Gómez	Chile	–	–	–	xo	xxx				1.48	
6	Graciela Paviotti	Argentina	o	o	o	xxo	xxx				1.48	
7	Marta Font	Cuba	o	xxo	o	xxx					1.45	
8	Mabel Farina	Argentina	o	o	xo	xxx					1.45	
9	Olga Catter	Peru	xo	o	xxx						1.40	

=== Long jump ===
Qualification – 8 October

Rank	Name	Nationality	Result	Notes
1	Edir Ribeiro	Brazil	5.39	q
2	Mabel Farina	Argentina	5.30	q
3	Iris dos Santos	Brazil	5.30	q
4	Graciela Paviotti	Argentina	5.26	q
5	Gisela Vidal	Venezuela	5.25	q
6	María Cristina Infante	Ecuador	5.15	q
7	Carlota Ulloa	Chile	5.09	q
8	Doris Peter	Chile	5.08	q
9	Francelina Anacleto	Portugal	4.96	q
10	Dinorah González	Uruguay	4.88	
11	Erica Holst	Paraguay	4.63	

Final – 8 October

Rank	Name	Nationality	#1	#2	#3	#4	#5	#6	Result	Notes
1st place, gold medalist(s)	Mabel Farina	Argentina	5.25	5.26	5.37	5.40	5.57	5.58	5.58	
2nd place, silver medalist(s)	Graciela Paviotti	Argentina	5.40	5.55	5.40	4.91	5.00	4.91	5.55	
3rd place, bronze medalist(s)	Gisela Vidal	Venezuela	5.17	4.89	5.02	5.22	5.18	5.40	5.40	
4	Edir Ribeiro	Brazil	5.13	5.19	4.81	5.11	x	5.34	5.34	
5	Iris dos Santos	Brazil	4.86	4.94	5.08	5.10	5.17	5.27	5.27	
6	Doris Peter	Chile	5.02	3.80	4.88	4.76	4.88	x	5.02	
7	Francelina Anacleto	Portugal	4.71	4.70	4.90				4.90	
8	María Cristina Infante	Ecuador	4.65	4.79	x				4.79	
	Carlota Ulloa	Chile	x	x	x				NM	

=== Shot put ===
10 October

Rank	Name	Nationality	#1	#2	#3	#4	#5	#6	Result	Notes
1st place, gold medalist(s)	Vera Trezoitko	Brazil	12.68	11.83	10.89	12.10	12.84	12.57	12.84	
2nd place, silver medalist(s)	Ingeborg Pfüller	Argentina	12.31	12.12	12.54	11.61	11.66	11.75	12.54	
3rd place, bronze medalist(s)	Pradelia Delgado	Chile	11.66	11.63	12.05	12.24	11.87	12.35	12.35	
4	Smiliana Dezulovic	Chile	11.08	11.48	11.83	11.70	11.84	11.21	11.84	
5	Maria de Lourdes Conceição	Brazil	11.18	11.60	x	11.43	11.16	10.92	11.60	
6	Ingeborg Mello	Argentina	11.27	10.86	10.30	10.65	11.15	11.18	11.27	
7	Julia Huapaya	Peru	10.91	10.46	10.90				10.91	
8	Hilda Ramírez	Cuba	10.13	9.85	10.62				10.62	
9	Lídia Faria	Portugal	9.36	x	9.18				9.36	

=== Discus throw ===
Qualification – 11 October

Rank	Name	Nationality	Result	Notes
1	Miriam Yutronic	Chile	42.83	q
2	Ingeborg Pfüller	Argentina	39.43	q
3	Pradelia Delgado	Chile	37.56	q
4	Ingeborg Mello	Argentina	37.23	q
5	Hilda Ramírez	Cuba	35.90	q
6	Maria Ventura	Brazil	35.79	q
7	Vera Trezoitko	Brazil	35.77	q
8	Caridad Agüero	Cuba	35.43	q
9	Julia Huapaya	Peru	33.41	q
10	Lídia Faria	Portugal	33.26	
11	Erica Holst	Paraguay	18.51	

Final – 11 October

Rank	Name	Nationality	#1	#2	#3	#4	#5	#6	Result	Notes
1st place, gold medalist(s)	Ingeborg Pfüller	Argentina	x	x	41.12	41.80	44.69	44.44	44.69	
2nd place, silver medalist(s)	Caridad Agüero	Cuba	42.69	x	42.29	43.56	44.27	44.00	44.27	
3rd place, bronze medalist(s)	Miriam Yutronic	Chile	38.95	42.29	x	42.38	41.28	41.67	42.38	
4	Pradelia Delgado	Chile	38.50	35.21	39.32	38.37	x	40.63	40.62	
5	Maria Ventura	Brazil	37.18	31.05	33.20	37.69	40.55	39.57	40.55	
6	Ingeborg Mello	Argentina	29.70	38.97	36.03	36.12	36.23	37.02	38.97	
7	Julia Huapaya	Peru	x	33.34	37.11				37.11	
8	Hilda Ramírez	Cuba	31.37	35.44	x				35.44	
9	Vera Trezoitko	Brazil	x	35.24	34.82				35.24	

=== Javelin throw ===
8 October – old model

Rank	Name	Nationality	#1	#2	#3	#4	#5	#6	Result	Notes
1st place, gold medalist(s)	Marlene Ahrens	Chile	43.62	45.63	43.78	45.40	42.34	43.07	45.63	
2nd place, silver medalist(s)	Maria Ventura	Brazil	42.19	42.01	40.38	40.49	39.46	42.24	42.24	
3rd place, bronze medalist(s)	Magdalena García	Argentina	37.42	38.97	37.79	38.31	37.96	37.10	38.97	
4	Hilda Ramírez	Cuba	38.97	32.94	36.53	35.68	30.06	35.99	38.97	
5	Smiliana Dezulovic	Chile	37.58	36.57	34.86	x	35.41	34.36	37.58	
6	Vera Trezoitko	Brazil	29.25	31.29	32.58	34.78	34.67	35.15	35.15	
