= Athletics at the 1955 Pan American Games – Women's javelin throw =

Women's javelin throw at the Pan American Games

The women's javelin throw event at the 1955 Pan American Games was held at the Estadio Universitario in Mexico City on 13 March.

== Results ==
Rank	Name	Nationality	Result	Notes
1st place, gold medalist(s)	Karen Anderson	United States	49.15	
2nd place, silver medalist(s)	Estrella Puente	Uruguay	43.43	
3rd place, bronze medalist(s)	Amelia Wershoven	United States	43.06	
4	Marjorie Larney	United States	40.52	
5	Carmen Venegas	Chile	40.10	
6	Anneliese Schmidt	Brazil	39.14	
7	Bertha Chiú	Mexico	36.69	
8	Rosa Gudiño	Mexico	34.56	
9	Sharon Cliffe	Canada	26.81	
	Jackie MacDonald	Canada	DNS	
	Ana Mercedes Campos	El Salvador	DNS	
	Vera Trezoitko	Brazil	DNS	
	Alejandrina Herrera	Cuba	DNS	
