= Roberto Chapchap =

Personal information
- Born: 3 November 1937 (age 88)

Sport
- Sport: Athletics
- Event: Hammer throw
Medal record
Representing Brazil
Pan American Games
| Bronze medal – third place | 1963 São Paulo | Hammer throw |

Roberto Chapchap (born 3 November 1937) is a retired Brazilian athlete who specialised in the hammer throw. He won several medals at regional level including the bronze at the 1963 Pan American Games.

== International competitions ==
| Year | Competition | Venue | Position | Event | Notes |
Representing Brazil
| 1957 | World University Games | Paris, France | 9th | Hammer throw | 46.91 m |
| 1959 | South American Championships (unofficial) | São Paulo, Brazil | 3rd | Hammer throw | 51.00 m |
| 1959 | Pan American Games | Chicago, United States | 4th | Hammer throw | 55.80 m |
| 1960 | Ibero-American Games | Santiago, Chile | 13th (q) | Discus throw | 40.84 m |
| 1960 | Ibero-American Games | Santiago, Chile | 3rd | Hammer throw | 52.15 m |
| 1961 | South American Championships | Lima, Peru | 2nd | Hammer throw | 50.81 m |
| 1962 | Ibero-American Games | Madrid, Spain | 4th | Hammer throw | 53.95 m |
| 1963 | Pan American Games | São Paulo, Brazil | 3rd | Hammer throw | 57.92 m |
| 1963 | South American Championships | Cali, Colombia | 2nd | Hammer throw | 55.08 m |
| 1963 | Universiade | Porto Alegre, Brazil | 7th | Hammer throw | 52.09 m |
| 1965 | South American Championships | Rio de Janeiro, Brazil | 1st | Hammer throw | 56.62 m |
| 1967 | Pan American Games | Winnipeg, Canada | 5th | Hammer throw | 55.61 m |
| 1967 | South American Championships | Buenos Aires, Argentina | 2nd | Hammer throw | 55.08 m |
