= Athletics at the 1959 Pan American Games – Women's discus throw =

Women's discus throw at the Pan American Games

The women's discus throw event at the 1959 Pan American Games was held at the Soldier Field in Chicago on 30 August.

== Results ==
Rank	Name	Nationality	Result	Notes
1st place, gold medalist(s)	Earlene Brown	United States	49.31	
2nd place, silver medalist(s)	Pam Kurrell	United States	42.19	
3rd place, bronze medalist(s)	Marjorie Larney	United States	42.18	
4	Alejandrina Herrera	Cuba	40.81	
5	Pradelia Delgado	Chile	39.56	
6	Marie Dupree	Canada	38.86	
7	Lili Schluter	Mexico	38.15	
8	Odette Domingos	Brazil	36.77	
	Vera Trezoitko	Brazil	DNS	
	Ivonne Rojano	Mexico	DNS	
