= Efraín Cordero =

Salvadoran middle-distance runner

Personal information
- Nationality: Salvadoran
- Born: 8 March 1938 Quezaltepeque, El Salvador
- Died: Unknown
- Height: 1.72 m (5 ft 8 in)
- Weight: 66 kg (146 lb)

Sport
- Sport: Middle-distance running
- Event: Steeplechase

Efraín Cordero (born 8 March 1938, date of death unknown) was a Salvadoran steeplechaser and long-distance runner. He made his international debut at the 1962 Central American and Caribbean Games, competing in the men's 3000 metres steeplechase. Six years later, he competed in the men's 3000 metres steeplechase at the 1968 Summer Olympics but did not advance past the qualifiers.

== Biography ==
Efraín Cordero was born on 8 March 1938 in Quezaltepeque, El Salvador. As an athlete, hhe competed for El Salvador in international competition.

Cordero made his international debut for El Salvador at the 1962 Central American and Caribbean Games held in Kingston, Jamaica. There, he competed in the men's 3000 metres steeplechase held on 20 August against eight other competitors. He recorded a time of 9:54.4 and placed sixth overall. Although he did not medal, he earned a new personal best time in the event. Cordero then competed at the 1962 Ibero-American Games held in Madrid, Spain, competing in two events. He first competed in the men's 5000 metres on 9 October against ten other competitors. There, he recorded a time of 17:44.0 and placed tenth. He then competed in the men's 3000 metres steeplechase two days later although his time and placement was not recorded.

Six years later, Cordero was selected to compete for El Salvador at the 1968 Summer Olympics in Mexico City, Mexico, for the nation's first appearance at an Olympic Games at a sporting capacity. For the 1968 Summer Games, he was entered in the men's 3000 metres steeplechase. In the qualifying heats of the event held on 14 October, he competed in the second heat against 13 other competitors. There, he recorded a time of 11:19.23 and placed thirteenth.

Cordero later died on an unknown date.
