= Modesto Mederos =

Cuban discus thrower

Personal information
- Full name: Modesto Mederos López
- Nationality: Cuban
- Born: 30 March 1942 (age 84) Santa Fe, Havana, Cuba
- Height: 1.94 m (6 ft 4 in)
- Weight: 102 kg (225 lb)

Sport
- Sport: Athletics
- Event: Discus throw

Modesto Mederos López (born 30 March 1942) is a Cuban athlete. He competed in the men's discus throw at the 1968 Summer Olympics.

== International competitions ==
Year	Competition	Venue	Position	Event	Notes
Representing Cuba
1962	Central American and Caribbean Games	Kingston, Jamaica	5th	Discus throw	45.36 m
1962	Ibero-American Games	Madrid, Spain	8th	Shot put	12.93 m
1962	Ibero-American Games	Madrid, Spain	12th (q)	Discus throw	43.68 m
1963	Pan American Games	São Paulo, Brazil	4th	Discus throw	48.22 m
1968	Olympic Games	Mexico City, Mexico	23rd (q)	Discus throw	52.30 m
1969	Central American and Caribbean Championships	Havana, Cuba	2nd	Shot put	15.68 m
1970	Central American and Caribbean Games	Panama City, Panama	3rd	Shot put	15.28 m

== Personal bests ==
- Discus throw – 56.20 (1967)
