= Athletics at the 1959 Pan American Games – Women's shot put =

Women's shot put at the Pan American Games

The women's shot put event at the 1959 Pan American Games was held at the Soldier Field in Chicago on 31 August.

== Results ==
Rank	Name	Nationality	Result	Notes
1st place, gold medalist(s)	Earlene Brown	United States	14.68	
2nd place, silver medalist(s)	Sharon Shepherd	United States	13.53	
3rd place, bronze medalist(s)	Wanda Wojagrowicz	United States	13.10	
4	Vera Trezoitko	Brazil	12.61	
5	Pradelia Delgado	Chile	12.05	
6	Renate Friederichs	Chile	10.96	
7	Lili Schluter	Mexico	9.53	
	Marie Dupree	Canada	DNS	
	Marlene Ahrens	Chile	DNS	
	Alejandrina Herrera	Cuba	DNS	
