= Héctor Menacho =

Peruvian rower (1928–2019)

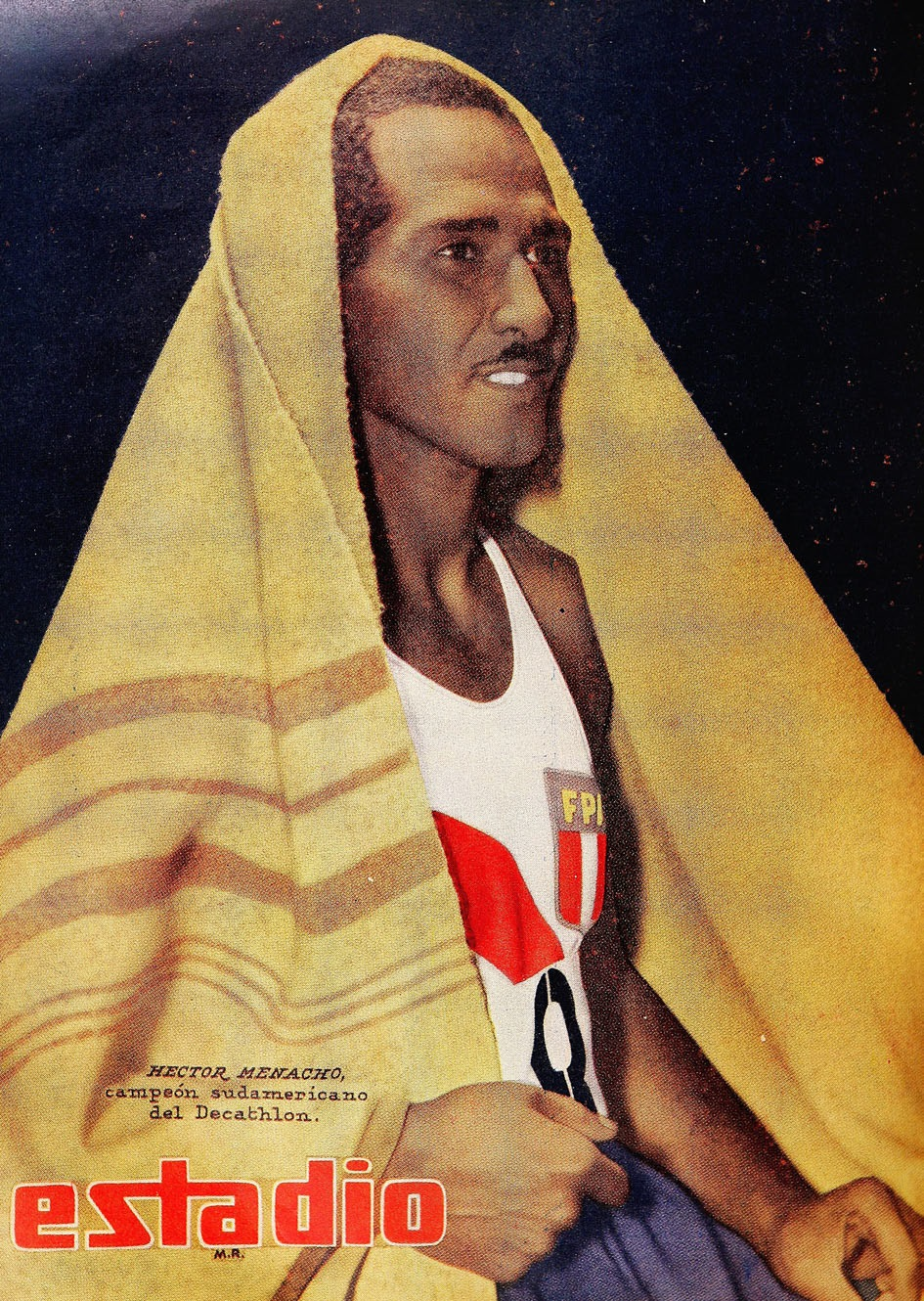

Personal information
- Full name: Héctor Menacho Pastor
- Born: 26 May 1928 Lima, Peru
- Died: 11 April 2019 (aged 90) Lima, Peru
- Height: 1.87 m (6 ft 2 in)
- Weight: 86 kg (190 lb)

Sport
- Sport: Rowing, athletics
- Events: Decathlon, discus throw

Héctor Menacho Pastor (26 May 1928 – 11 April 2019) was a Peruvian athlete turned rower. He competed in the men's coxed pair event at the 1968 Summer Olympics. Menacho died in Lima on 11 April 2019, at the age of 90. As a track and field athlete he specialised in the decathlon and discus throw.

== International competitions (athletics) ==
Year	Competition	Venue	Position	Event	Notes
Representing Peru
1949	South American Championships	Lima, Peru	4th	4 × 400 m relay	3:26.5
1954	South American Championships	São Paulo, Brazil	4th	Discus throw	43.95 m
1954	South American Championships	São Paulo, Brazil	5th	Decathlon	5559 pts
1956	South American Championships	Santiago, Chile	9th	Discus throw	40.03 m
1956	South American Championships	Santiago, Chile	1st	Decathlon	5670 pts
1958	South American Championships	Montevideo, Uruguay	6th	Discus throw	44.19 m
1958	South American Championships	Montevideo, Uruguay	6th	Decathlon	5515 pts
1960	Ibero-American Games	Santiago, Chile	7th	Discus throw	44.46 m
1961	South American Championships	Lima, Peru	3rd	Discus throw	46.97 m
1962	Ibero-American Games	Madrid, Spain	9th	Discus throw	43.22 m
1963	South American Championships	Cali, Colombia	4th	Discus throw	46.30 m
1963	Pan American Games	Chicago, United States	5th	Discus throw	47.60 m
