= 1959 South American Championships in Athletics (unofficial) – Results =

These are the results of the unofficial 1959 South American Championships in Athletics (known in Spanish as II Torneo de Campeones Sudamericanos) which took place at the Pacaembu Stadium in São Paulo, Brazil, on 22, 23 and 24 May. The athletics meeting was for men only with the participation from three countries Argentina, Brazil and Chile, each represented by two athletes in an event and points awarded for each place.

== Team scores ==
Rank	Country	Points
1	Brazil	237 pts
3	Chile	220 pts
2	Argentina	163 pts

== Results ==
=== 100 metres ===
Rank	Name	Nationality	Time	Notes
1st place, gold medalist(s)	José Telles da Conceição	Brazil	10.5	
2nd place, silver medalist(s)	Luis Vienna	Argentina	10.6	
3rd place, bronze medalist(s)	Jorge de Barros	Brazil	10.8	
4	Eduardo Krumm	Chile	10.9	
5	Roberto Ferrario	Argentina	10.9	
6	Juan Mouat	Chile	11.1	

=== 200 metres ===
Rank	Name	Nationality	Time	Notes
1st place, gold medalist(s)	José Telles da Conceição	Brazil	21.4	
2nd place, silver medalist(s)	Luis Vienna	Argentina	21.8	
3rd place, bronze medalist(s)	Jorge de Barros	Brazil	22.1	
4	Eduardo Krumm	Chile	22.1	
5	Juan Carlos Salom	Argentina	22.7	
6	Hugo de la Fuente	Chile	23.0	

=== 400 metres ===
Rank	Name	Nationality	Time	Notes
1st place, gold medalist(s)	Anubes da Silva	Brazil	49.0	
2nd place, silver medalist(s)	Peter Ostermeier	Brazil	49.1	
3rd place, bronze medalist(s)	Víctor Lozano	Argentina	49.8	
4	José Gallegos	Chile	50.9	
5	Juan Carlos Dyrzka	Argentina	54.9	
	Hugo Krauss	Argentina	DNF	

=== 800 metres ===
Rank	Name	Nationality	Time	Notes
1st place, gold medalist(s)	Ramón Sandoval	Chile	1:54.1	
2nd place, silver medalist(s)	Manuel da Silva	Brazil	1:54.7	
3rd place, bronze medalist(s)	Hugo Krauss	Chile	1:55.4	
4	Anubes da Silva	Brazil	1:55.9	
5	Ricardo Grecca	Argentina	1:56.2	
6	Bruno Mior	Argentina	1:56.3	

=== 1500 metres ===
Rank	Name	Nationality	Time	Notes
1st place, gold medalist(s)	Ramón Sandoval	Chile	3:57.8	
2nd place, silver medalist(s)	Manuel da Silva	Brazil	3:58.9	
3rd place, bronze medalist(s)	Gilberto Miori	Argentina	3:59.3	
4	Alberto Ríos	Argentina	4:01.6	
5	Armin Osswald	Chile	4:04.1	
6	Sebastião Mendes	Brazil	4:06.0	

=== 5000 metres ===
Rank	Name	Nationality	Time	Notes
1st place, gold medalist(s)	Luis Sandoval	Argentina	15:01.4	
2nd place, silver medalist(s)	Ricardo Vidal	Chile	15:06.2	
3rd place, bronze medalist(s)	José Calixto	Brazil	15:10.8	
4	Edgar Freire	Brazil	15:30.5	
5	Luis Campusano	Chile	15:39.7	
6	Gilberto Miori	Argentina	16:08.4	

=== 10,000 metres ===
Rank	Name	Nationality	Time	Notes
1st place, gold medalist(s)	Luis Sandoval	Argentina	31:46.4	
2nd place, silver medalist(s)	Luis Campusano	Chile	31:58.7	
3rd place, bronze medalist(s)	José Calixto	Brazil	32:11.4	
4	Armando Pino	Argentina	33:04.3	
5	Manuel Salva	Chile	33:24.3	
6	Alfredo de Oliveira	Brazil	33:27.8	

=== Marathon ===
Rank	Name	Nationality	Time	Notes
1st place, gold medalist(s)	Juan Silva	Chile	2:36:15	
2nd place, silver medalist(s)	José Campos	Brazil	2:41:57	
3rd place, bronze medalist(s)	Enrique Tapia	Chile	2:45:20	
4	José Chacón	Argentina	2:46:51	
	Armando Pino	Argentina	DNF	
	J. Silva	Brazil	DNF	

=== 110 metres hurdles ===
Rank	Name	Nationality	Time	Notes
1st place, gold medalist(s)	Wilson Carneiro	Brazil	14.8	
2nd place, silver medalist(s)	Francisco Bergonzoni	Brazil	15.2	
3rd place, bronze medalist(s)	Estanislao Kocourek	Argentina	15.2	
4	Jorn Gevert	Chile	15.3	
5	Carlos Cozzi	Argentina	15.5	
6	Héctor Henríquez	Chile	15.7	

=== 400 metres hurdles ===
Rank	Name	Nationality	Time	Notes
1st place, gold medalist(s)	Anubes da Silva	Brazil	54.4	
2nd place, silver medalist(s)	Ulisses dos Santos	Brazil	54.6	
3rd place, bronze medalist(s)	Jorge Bolados	Chile	55.8	
4	Juan Carlos Dyrzka	Argentina	57.1	
5	Jorn Gevert	Chile	57.7	
6	Osvaldo Fernández	Argentina	57.9	

=== 3000 metres steeplechase ===
Rank	Name	Nationality	Time	Notes
1st place, gold medalist(s)	Francisco Allen	Chile	9:05.5	AR
2nd place, silver medalist(s)	Alberto Ríos	Argentina	9:10.3	
3rd place, bronze medalist(s)	Santiago Novas	Chile	9:11.5	
4	José Santos Primo	Brazil	9:17.7	
5	Sebastião Mendes	Brazil	9:21.7	
6	Domingo Amaizón	Argentina	9:23.9	

=== 4 × 100 metres relay ===
Rank	Nation	Competitors	Time	Notes
1st place, gold medalist(s)	Brazil	Affonso da Silva, Jorge de Barros, Paulo da Fonseca, José Telles da Conceição	41.2	
2nd place, silver medalist(s)	Chile	Juan Mouat, Hugo Krauss, Hugo de la Fuente, Eduardo Krumm	42.6	
3rd place, bronze medalist(s)	Argentina	Juan Carlos Salom, Roberto Ferrario, Gerardo Bönnhoff, Luis Vienna	44.1	

=== 4 × 400 metres relay ===
Rank	Nation	Competitors	Time	Notes
1st place, gold medalist(s)	Brazil	Ulisses dos Santos, Anubes da Silva, Argemiro Roque, Peter Ostermeier	3:16.5	
2nd place, silver medalist(s)	Chile	César Pinilla, José Gallegos, Jorge Bolados, Hugo Krauss	3:22.2	
3rd place, bronze medalist(s)	Argentina	Fernández, Francisco Paganessi, Ricardo Grecca, Víctor Lozano	3:26.4	

=== High jump ===
Rank	Name	Nationality	Result	Notes
1st place, gold medalist(s)	Juan Ruiz	Chile	1.90	
2nd place, silver medalist(s)	Hans Ackermann	Brazil	1.85	
3rd place, bronze medalist(s)	Horacio Martínez	Argentina	1.80	
4	Eugenio Velasco	Chile	1.80	
5	R. Domsch	Argentina	1.80	
6	José Telles da Conceição	Brazil	1.75	

=== Pole vault ===
Rank	Name	Nationality	Result	Notes
1st place, gold medalist(s)	José Luis Infante	Chile	3.90	
2nd place, silver medalist(s)	Tomatsu Nishida	Brazil	3.80	
3rd place, bronze medalist(s)	Mario Eleusippi	Argentina	3.70	
4	Cristián Raab	Chile	3.60	
5	Fausto de Souza	Brazil	3.60	
6	Ricardo Bonini	Argentina	3.60	

=== Long jump ===
Rank	Name	Nationality	Result	Notes
1st place, gold medalist(s)	Carlos Tornquist	Chile	7.19	
2nd place, silver medalist(s)	Eduardo Krumm	Chile	7.10	
3rd place, bronze medalist(s)	Luís Akuta	Brazil	7.09	
4	A. Santalucia	Brazil	7.08	
5	Pedro Marcel	Argentina	7.04	
6	Julio Ibarreche	Argentina	6.99	

=== Triple jump ===
Rank	Name	Nationality	Result	Notes
1st place, gold medalist(s)	Adhemar da Silva	Brazil	15.69	
2nd place, silver medalist(s)	Reinaldo de Oliveira	Brazil	14.73	
3rd place, bronze medalist(s)	Ariel Standen	Chile	14.66	
4	Luis Cueva	Chile	14.39	
5	Julio Ibarreche	Argentina	14.05	
	Jorge Castillo	Argentina	DNS	

=== Shot put ===
Rank	Name	Nationality	Result	Notes
1st place, gold medalist(s)	Enrique Helf	Argentina	15.68	
2nd place, silver medalist(s)	Leonardo Kittsteiner	Chile	14.61	
3rd place, bronze medalist(s)	Isolino Taborda	Brazil	14.57	
4	Alcides Dambrós	Brazil	14.14	
5	Roque Eguillor	Argentina	13.86	
6	Juris Laipenieks	Chile	13.19	

=== Discus throw ===
Rank	Name	Nationality	Result	Notes
1st place, gold medalist(s)	Hernán Haddad	Chile	48.17	
2nd place, silver medalist(s)	Enrique Helf	Argentina	45.64	
3rd place, bronze medalist(s)	Horacio Beluardo	Argentina	44.65	
4	João Alexandre	Brazil	43.42	
5	Mario Schofield	Chile	42.97	
6	Milton dos Santos	Brazil	42.96	

=== Hammer throw ===
Rank	Name	Nationality	Result	Notes
1st place, gold medalist(s)	Bruno Strohmeier	Brazil	56.06	
2nd place, silver medalist(s)	Alejandro Díaz	Chile	51.81	
3rd place, bronze medalist(s)	Roberto Chapchap	Brazil	51.00	
4	Arturo Melcher	Chile	45.41	
5	Ricardo Muñoz	Argentina	45.03	
6	H. Drummel	Argentina	43.97	

=== Javelin throw ===
*Old model

Rank	Name	Nationality	Result	Notes
1st place, gold medalist(s)	Ricardo Héber	Argentina	65.85	
2nd place, silver medalist(s)	Nelson Matteucci	Argentina	62.43	
3rd place, bronze medalist(s)	L. Marcelino	Brazil	57.40	
4	Juris Laipenieks	Chile	54.76	
5	Orlando Garrido	Brazil	54.48	
6	Víctor Salas	Chile	53.77	

=== Decathlon ===
23–24 May – 1952 tables (1985 conversions given with *)

Rank	Athlete	Nationality	100m	LJ	SP	HJ	400m	110m H	DT	PV	JT	1500m	Points	Conv.	Notes
1st place, gold medalist(s)	Juris Laipenieks	Chile	11.4	6.83	12.31	1.66	53.1	17.3	39.20	3.00	54.90	4:47.1	5658	6165*	
2nd place, silver medalist(s)	Emir Martínez	Argentina	11.7	6.40	12.53	1.77	52.8	16.5	34.62	2.90	49.30	4:28.8	5637	6134*	
3rd place, bronze medalist(s)	Luís Fernandes	Brazil											5279		
4	Rúbens Habesch	Brazil											5267		
5	Hernán Figueroa	Chile											5176		
6	Nelson Matteucci	Argentina											2726		
