= Athletics at the 1963 Pan American Games – Men's hammer throw =

Men's hammer throw at the Pan American Games

The men's hammer throw event at the 1963 Pan American Games was held at the Pacaembu Stadium in São Paulo on 3 May.

== Results ==
| Rank | Name | Nationality | Result | Notes |
|---|---|---|---|---|
| 1st place, gold medalist(s) | Al Hall | United States | 62.74 | |
| 2nd place, silver medalist(s) | Jim Pryde | United States | 58.56 | |
| 3rd place, bronze medalist(s) | Roberto Chapchap | Brazil | 57.92 | |
| 4 | Enrique Samuells | Cuba | 56.21 | |
| 5 | Lido Crispieri | Chile | 54.67 | |
| 6 | Bruno Strohmeier | Brazil | 53.04 | |
| | Alejandro Díaz | Chile | DNS | |
