= Alejandro Díaz (athlete) =

Chilean hammer thrower (1920–2004)

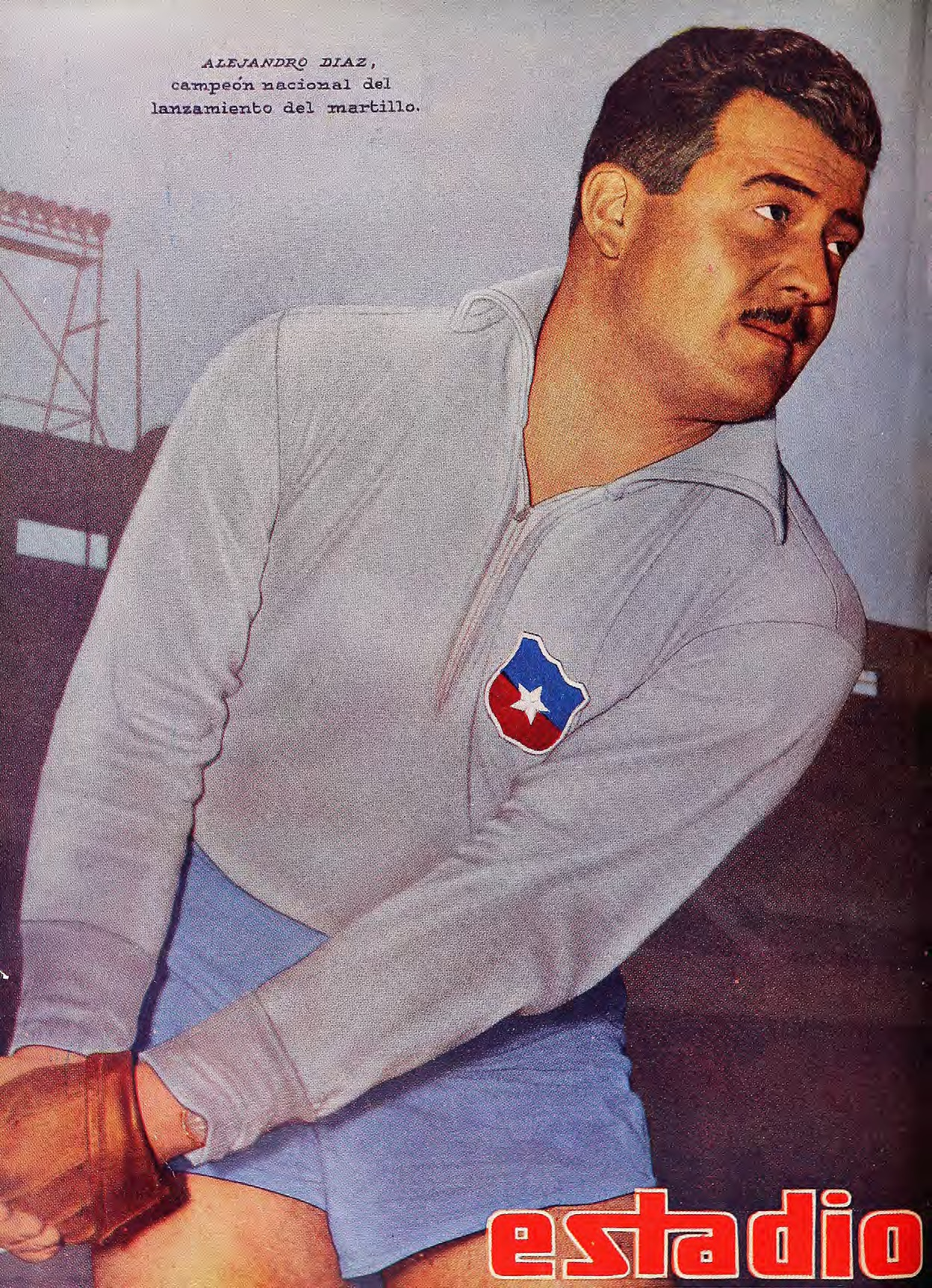

Personal information
- Full name: Alejandro Díaz Bertoli
- Born: 5 July 1920 Santiago, Chile
- Died: 12 April 2004 (aged 83) Santiago, Chile
- Height: 1.76 m (5 ft 9 in)
- Weight: 100 kg (220 lb)

Sport
- Sport: Athletics
- Event: Hammer throw
Medal record
Men's Athletics
Representing Chile
South American Championships
Bronze medal – third place	1953 Santiago	Hammer throw
Silver medal – second place	1954 São Paulo	Hammer throw
Gold medal – first place	1956 Santiago	Hammer throw
Bronze medal – third place	1957 Santiago	Hammer throw
Gold medal – first place	1958 Montevideo	Hammer throw
Ibero-American Games
Silver medal – second place	1960 Santiago	Hammer throw

Alejandro Díaz Bertoli (Note: In this Spanish name, the first or paternal surname is Díaz and the second or maternal family name is Bertoli.) (5 July 1920 – 12 April 2004) was a Chilean athlete. He competed in the men's hammer throw at the 1956 Summer Olympics.

== International competitions ==
Year	Competition	Venue	Position	Event	Notes
Representing Chile
1953	South American Championships (unofficial)	Santiago, Chile	3rd	Hammer throw	48.65 m
1954	South American Championships	São Paulo, Brazil	2nd	Hammer throw	50.04 m
1955	Pan American Games	Mexico City, Mexico	4th	Hammer throw	50.56 m
1956	South American Championships	Santiago, Chile	1st	Hammer throw	52.88 m
1956	Olympic Games	Melbourne, Australia	18th (q)	Hammer throw	52.23 m
1957	South American Championships (unofficial)	Santiago, Chile	3rd	Hammer throw	50.37 m
1958	South American Championships	Montevideo, Uruguay	1st	Hammer throw	54.45 m
1959	South American Championships (unofficial)	São Paulo, Brazil	2nd	Hammer throw	51.81 m
1959	Pan American Games	Chicago, United States	7th	Hammer throw	51.34 m
1960	Ibero-American Games	Santiago, Chile	2nd	Hammer throw	52.16 m
1961	South American Championships	Lima, Peru	5th	Hammer throw	49.80 m
1962	Ibero-American Games	Madrid, Spain	10th	Hammer throw	50.22 m

== Personal bests ==
- Hammer throw – 55.33 m (1958)
