= Athletics at the 1951 Pan American Games – Women's discus throw =

Women's discus throw at the Pan American Games

The women's discus throw event at the 1951 Pan American Games was held at the Estadio Monumental in Buenos Aires on 27 February.

== Results ==
| Rank | Name | Nationality | Result | Notes |
|---|---|---|---|---|
| 1st place, gold medalist(s) | Ingeborg Mello | Argentina | 38.55 | |
| 2nd place, silver medalist(s) | Ingeborg Pfüller | Argentina | 37.19 | |
| 3rd place, bronze medalist(s) | Frances Kaszubski | United States | 35.84 | |
| 4 | Daysi Hoffman | Chile | 35.49 | |
| 5 | Zulema Bonaparte | Argentina | 33.52 | |
| 6 | Leni de Freese | Chile | 33.40 | |
| 7 | Concepción Villanueva | Mexico | 33.10 | |
| 8 | Vera Trezoitko | Brazil | 32.27 | |
| 9 | Julia Huapaya | Peru | 31.27 | |
| 10 | Maria Boecke | Chile | 30.64 | |
| 11 | Bertha Chiú | Mexico | 28.31 | |
| 12 | Judith Caballero | Panama | 27.78 | |
| | Amelia Bert | United States | DNS | |
| | Hortensia López | Mexico | DNS | |
