= Isabel Avellán =

Argentine discus thrower

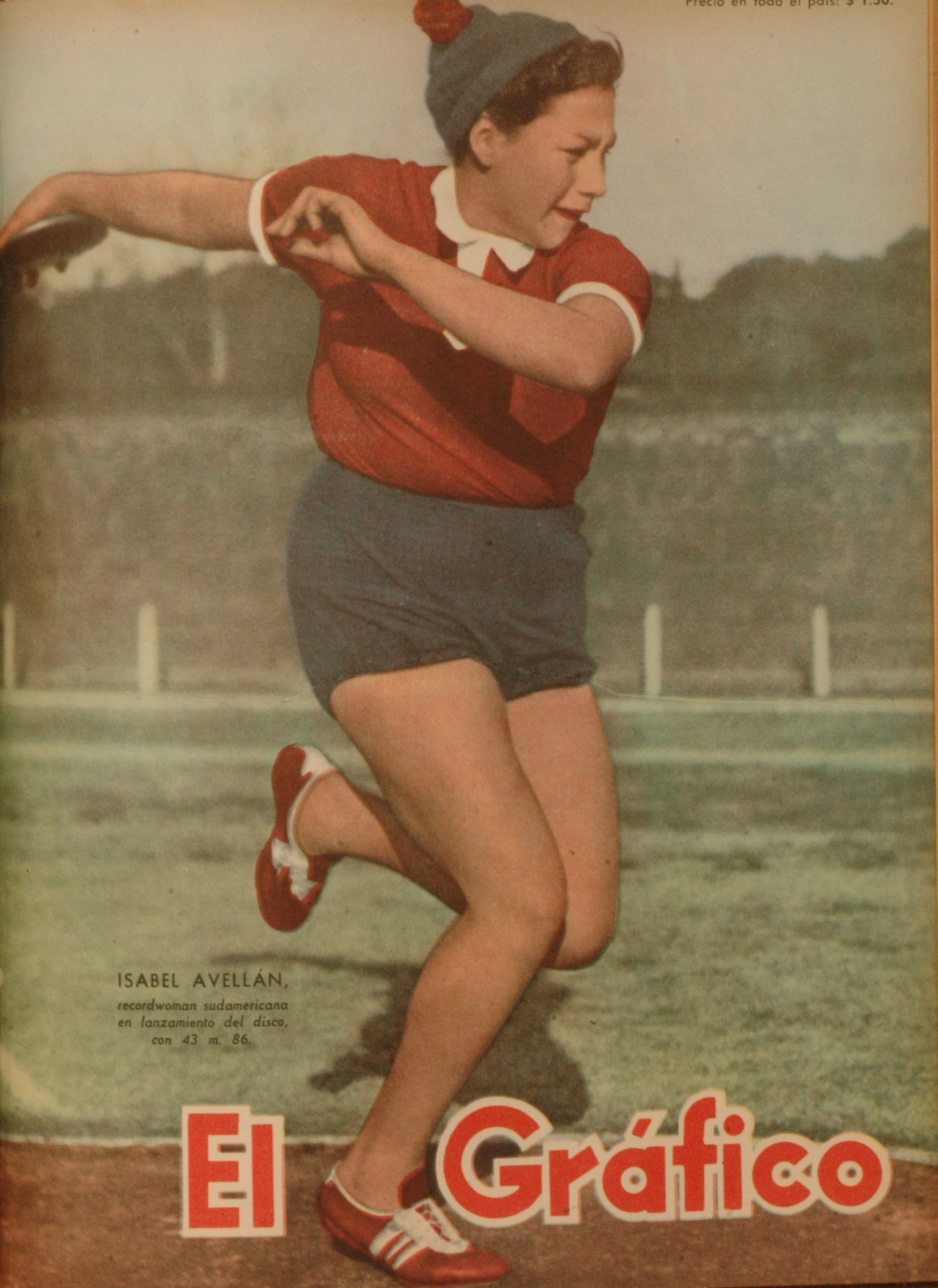
- Isabel Avellán in 1953

Personal information
- Full name: Isabel Ercilla Avellán
- Nationality: Argentine
- Born: 20 August 1933
- Died: 20 September 2010 (aged 77)
- Height: 1.62 m (5 ft 4 in)
- Weight: 70 kg (154 lb)

Sport
- Sport: Athletics
- Event: Discus throw

Isabel Ercilla Avellán (20 August 1933 – 20 September 2010) was an Argentine athlete. She competed in the women's discus throw at the 1956 Summer Olympics.

== Biography ==
Avellán was born in 1933, and at the age of nineteen, she won the discus and the shot put events at the 1952 Argentine Championships. By 1954, she had become a three-time national champion in the discus throw.

At the 1955 Pan American Games in Mexico City, Avellán won the silver medal in the women's discus throw, setting a new national record. A year later, at the 1956 Summer Olympics in Melbourne, Avellán was the flag bearer for Argentina, becoming the first female flag bearer for the nation at the Olympics. Avellán competed in the women's discus throw at the Olympics, finishing in sixth place out of 22 participants.

Avellán also competed at multiple editions of the South American Championships in Athletics, winning gold in the discus in the 1956 Championships, and two golds, in the discus and shot put, at the 1958 Championships.

After moving to Australia with her husband, Frank De Neefe, Avellán won the discus event at the 1960 Australian Athletics Championships.

Avellán and her husband were married from 1956 until his death in 2007. They had a daughter, Brigid.

== International competitions ==
Year	Competition	Venue	Position	Event	Notes
Representing Argentina
1953	South American Championships (unofficial)	Santiago, Chile	2nd	Shot put	11.37 m
1953	South American Championships (unofficial)	Santiago, Chile	1st	Discus throw	41.17 m
1953	South American Championships (unofficial)	Santiago, Chile	6th	Javelin throw	21.06 m
1955	Pan American Games	Mexico City, Mexico	2nd	Discus throw	40.06 m
1956	South American Championships	Santiago, Chile	4th	Shot put	11.20 m
1956	South American Championships	Santiago, Chile	1st	Discus throw	44.08 m
1956	Olympic Games	Melbourne, Australia	6th	Discus throw	46.73 m
1958	South American Championships	Montevideo, Uruguay	1st	Shot put	12.69 m
1958	South American Championships	Montevideo, Uruguay	1st	Discus throw	44.57 m

== Personal bests ==
- Shot put – 12.69 m (Montevideo 1958)
- Discus throw – 47.22 m (La Plata 1956) former NR
