= Affonso da Silva =

Brazilian sprinter (1934–2007)

Personal information
- Born: 24 July 1934 Rio de Janeiro, Brazil
- Died: 14 September 2007 (aged 73) Niterói, Brazil
- Height: 1.63 m (5 ft 4 in)
- Weight: 57 kg (126 lb)

Sport
- Sport: Sprinting
- Event: 100 metres

Affonso Coelho da Silva (24 July 1934 – 14 September 2007) was a Brazilian sprinter. He competed in the men's 100 metres at the 1960 Summer Olympics. Silva died in Niterói on 14 September 2007, at the age of 73.

== International competitions ==
Year	Competition	Venue	Position	Event	Notes
Representing Brazil
1958	South American Championships	Montevideo, Uruguay	1st	4 × 100 m relay	41.3
1959	South American Championships (unofficial)	São Paulo, Brazil	1st	4 × 100 m relay	41.2
1959	Pan American Games	Chicago, United States	4th	4 × 100 m relay	41.6
1960	Olympic Games	Rome, Italy	25th (h)	100 m	10.8
1960	Ibero-American Games	Santiago, Chile	5th (sf)	100 m	10.6
1960	Ibero-American Games	Santiago, Chile	7th (sf)	200 m	21.7
1960	Ibero-American Games	Santiago, Chile	2nd	4 × 100 m relay	40.6
1961	South American Championships	Lima, Peru	7th (sf)	100 m	10.9
1961	South American Championships	Lima, Peru	8th (sf)	200 m	22.5
1961	South American Championships	Lima, Peru	2nd	4 × 100 m relay	41.5
1962	Ibero-American Games	Madrid, Spain	3rd	100 m	11.1
1962	Ibero-American Games	Madrid, Spain	11th (sf)	200 m	22.6
1962	Ibero-American Games	Madrid, Spain	1st	4 × 100 m relay	41.2
1963	Pan American Games	São Paulo, Brazil	5th (h)	100 m	10.64
1963	Pan American Games	São Paulo, Brazil	4th	4 × 100 m relay	41.23
1963	South American Championships	Cali, Colombia	3rd	100 m	10.7
1963	South American Championships	Cali, Colombia	4th	200 m	21.6
1963	South American Championships	Cali, Colombia	1st	4 × 100 m relay	40.9
1965	South American Championships	Rio de Janeiro, Brazil	4th	100 m	10.8
1965	South American Championships	Rio de Janeiro, Brazil	8th (sf)	200 m	22.4
1965	South American Championships	Rio de Janeiro, Brazil	1st	4 × 100 m relay	41.2
1967	South American Championships	Buenos Aires, Argentina	5th (h)	100 m	10.9
1967	South American Championships	Buenos Aires, Argentina	3rd	4 × 100 m relay	41.8

== Personal bests ==
- 100 metres – 10.64 (1963)
