= Evelia Farina =

Argentine sprinter

Personal information
- Full name: Mabel Evelia Farina
- Nationality: Argentine
- Born: 7 October 1941
- Died: 24 April 2024 (aged 82)

Sport
- Sport: Athletics
- Event: Long jump

Mabel Evelia Farina (7 October 1941 – 24 April 2024) was an Argentine sprinter. She competed in the women's 4 × 100 metres relay at the 1964 Summer Olympics.

== International competitions ==
Year	Competition	Venue	Position	Event	Notes
Representing Argentina
1962	Ibero-American Games	Madrid, Spain	8th	High jump	1.45 m
1962	Ibero-American Games	Madrid, Spain	1st	Long jump	5.58 m
1963	South American Championships	Cali, Colombia	6th	High jump	1.40 m
1963	South American Championships	Cali, Colombia	1st	Long jump	5.74 m
1964	Olympic Games	Tokyo, Japan	10th (h)	4 × 100 m relay	46.7 s
1964	Olympic Games	Tokyo, Japan	26th (q)	Long jump	5.57 m

== Personal bests ==
- Long jump – 6.17 (Buenos Aires 1964, former NR)
