= Juan Silva (athlete) =

Chilean long-distance runner

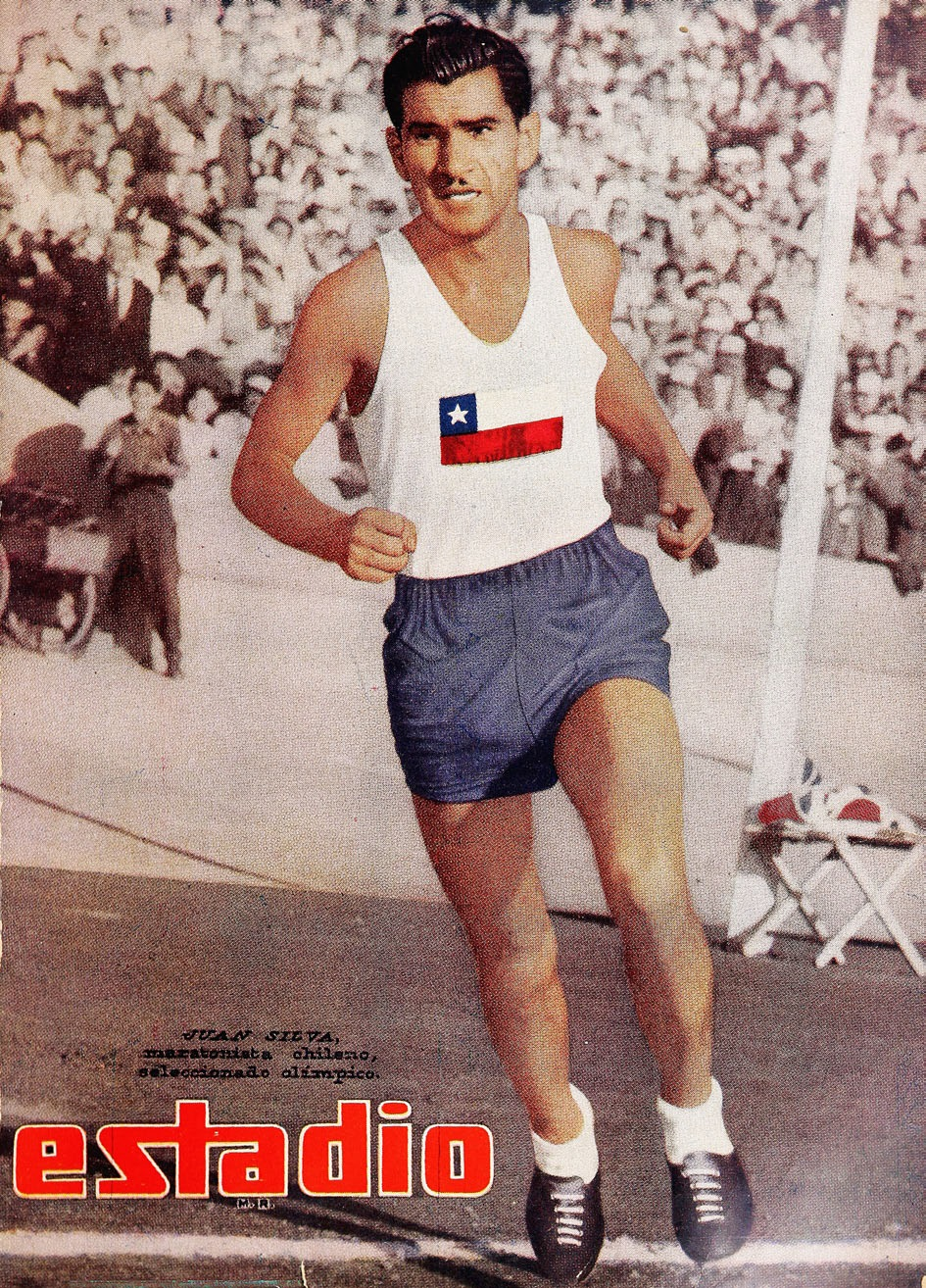

Personal information
- Born: 24 June 1930 Concepción, Chile
- Died: 2007 (aged 76–77)
- Height: 1.67 m (5 ft 6 in)
- Weight: 58 kg (128 lb)

Sport
- Sport: Long-distance running
- Event: Marathon

Juan Silva (24 June 1930 – 2007) was a Chilean long-distance runner. He competed in the marathon at the 1956 Summer Olympics and the 1960 Summer Olympics.

== International competitions ==
Year	Competition	Venue	Position	Event	Notes
Representing Chile
1956	South American Championships	Santiago, Chile	3rd	Half marathon	1:10:31
1956	Olympic Games	Melbourne, Australia	–	Marathon	DNF
1957	South American Championships (unofficial)	Santiago, Chile	3rd	Half marathon	1:08:02
1958	South American Championships	Montevideo, Uruguay	3rd	Half marathon	1:13:45
1959	South American Championships (unofficial)	São Paulo, Brazil	1st	Marathon	2:36:15
1959	Pan American Games	Chicago, United States	5th	Marathon	2:42:35
1960	Olympic Games	Rome, Italy	33rd	Marathon	2:31:18
1960	Ibero-American Games	Santiago, Chile	5th	Marathon	2:52:26
1961	South American Championships	Lima, Peru	1st	Marathon	2:39:36

== Personal bests ==
- Marathon – 2:28:31 (1956)
