= Centro Esportivo Virtual =

Centro Esportivo Virtual is a non profit Brazilian NGO dedicated to knowledge management in Physical Education, Sports and Leisure, that aims to be the “entrance door” for the international sport information in the Portuguese speaking world. Centro Esportivo Virtual is the most comprehensive organisation of this kind in the world and counts about over 230 communities and over 30.000 members, including athletes, students, researchers and professionals in the Sport science. Centro Esportivo Virtual website
