= Santiago Novas =

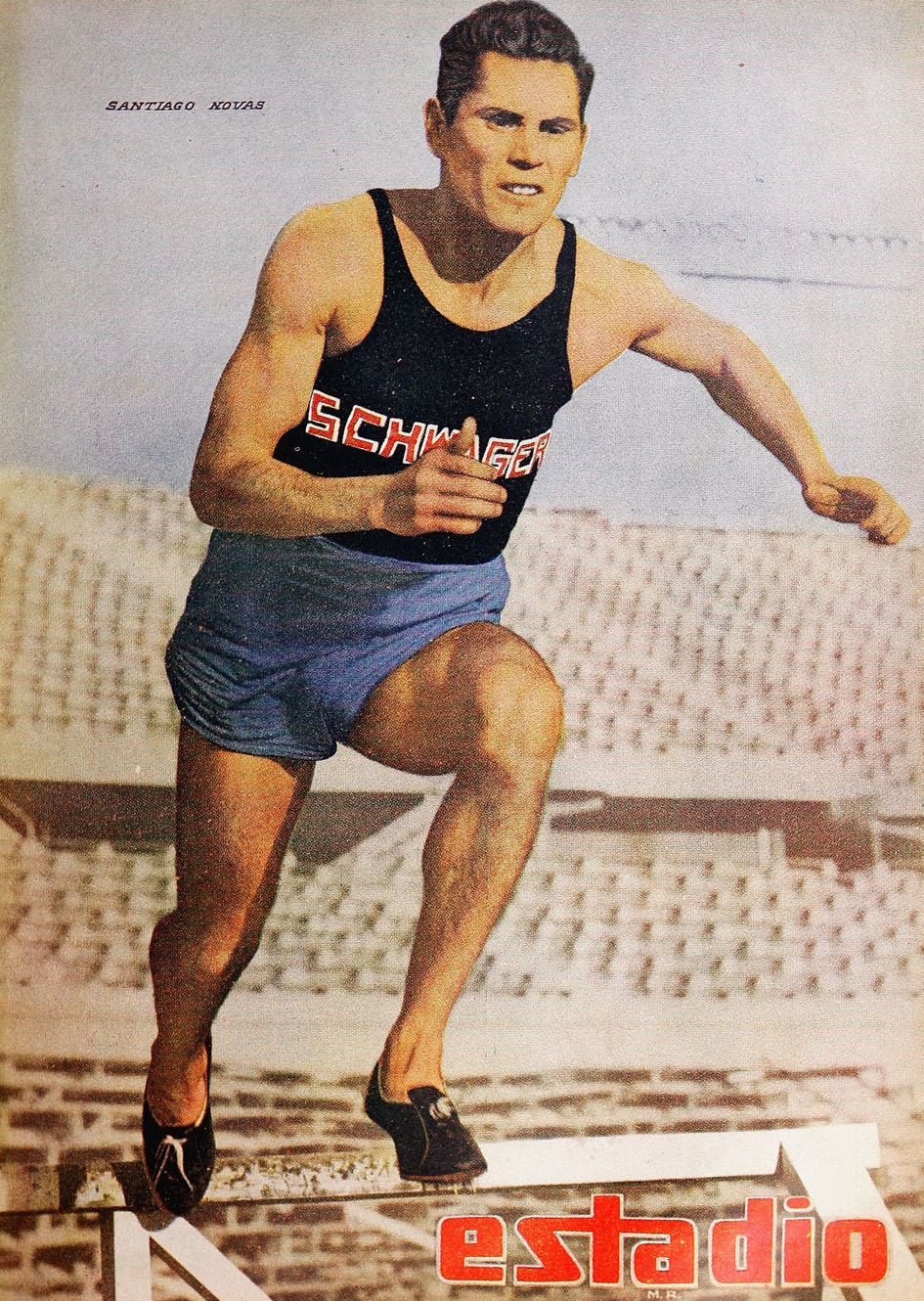
- Santiago Novas in 1955

Personal information
- Born: 4 January 1931 (age 95)

Santiago Novas (born 4 January 1931) is a retired Chilean runner who specialised in the 3000 metres steeplechase. He won multiple medals at regional level including silver at the 1955 Pan American Games.

== International competitions ==
Year	Competition	Venue	Position	Event	Notes
Representing Chile
1953	South American Championships (unofficial)	Santiago, Chile	3rd	3000 m s'chase	9:29.7
1954	South American Championships	São Paulo, Brazil	3rd	1500 m	3:57.7
1954	South American Championships	São Paulo, Brazil	2nd	5000 m	15:07.8
1954	South American Championships	São Paulo, Brazil	3rd	3000 m s'chase	9:26.6
1955	Pan American Games	Mexico City, Mexico	2nd	3000 m s'chase	9:50.4
1956	South American Championships	Santiago, Chile	4th	5000 m	15:10.4
1956	South American Championships	Santiago, Chile	1st	3000 m s'chase	9:09.0
1957	South American Championships (unofficial)	Santiago, Chile	2nd	3000 m s'chase	9:30.2
1958	South American Championships	Montevideo, Uruguay	6th	5000 m	15:03.1
1958	South American Championships	Montevideo, Uruguay	2nd	3000 m s'chase	9:20.4
1959	South American Championships (unofficial)	Santiago, Chile	3rd	3000 m s'chase	9:11.5
1960	Ibero-American Games	Santiago, Chile	5th	3000 m s'chase	9:14.2

== Personal bests ==
- 3000 metres steeplechase – 9:09.0h (Santiago 1956)
