= Athletics at the 1957 World University Games – Men's hammer throw =

The men's hammer throw event at the 1957 World University Games was held at the Stadium Charlety in Paris with the final on 7 September 1957.

== Medalists ==
Gold	Silver	Bronze
Anatoliy Samotsvetov; Soviet Union	Zvonko Bezjak; Yugoslavia	Gyula Zsivótzky; Hungary

== Results ==
=== Final ===
Rank	Name	Nationality	#1	#2	#3	#4	#5	#6	Result	Notes
1st place, gold medalist(s)	Anatoliy Samotsvetov	Soviet Union	x	57.95	56.82	58.11	58.60	?	58.60	
2nd place, silver medalist(s)	Zvonko Bezjak	Yugoslavia	54.79	54.14	54.52	54.21	57.95	57.69	57.95	
3rd place, bronze medalist(s)	Gyula Zsivótzky	Hungary	55.05	x	55.81	54.37	x	54.98	55.81	
4	Przemysław Kwiatkowski	Poland	50.15	49.01	49.76	49.35	x	51.42	51.42	
5	Ulrico Dahms	West Germany	50.47	x	47.97	49.04	49.01	x	50.47	
6	Seiko Yasuoka	Japan	50.05	x	x	47.78	x	x	50.05	
7	José María Elorriaga	Spain							49.27	NR
8	Iain Bain	Great Britain							48.41	
9	Roberto Chapchap	Brazil							46.91	
10	Haroldo Guimarães	Brazil							46.60	
11	Corrado Laliscia	Italy							46.60	
12	Robert Scott	Great Britain							46.55	
