= Athletics at the 1967 Pan American Games – Men's hammer throw =

Men's hammer throw at the Pan American Games

The men's hammer throw event at the 1967 Pan American Games was held in Winnipeg on 4 August.

== Results ==
Rank	Name	Nationality	Result	Notes
1st place, gold medalist(s)	Tom Gage	United States	65.32	
2nd place, silver medalist(s)	Enrique Samuells	Cuba	64.66	
3rd place, bronze medalist(s)	George Frenn	United States	64.06	
4	José Alberto Vallejo	Argentina	60.32	
5	Roberto Chapchap	Brazil	55.61	
6	Michael Cairns	Canada	55.19	
7	Gary Salmond	Canada	54.31	
8	Marceliano Borrero	Colombia	53.62	
9	Pedro Granell	Puerto Rico	50.42	
