= Enrique Samuells =

Personal information
- Full name: Enrique Samuells Ricardo
- Born: 20 September 1938 (age 87) Tacajó, Holguín Province, Cuba

Sport
- Sport: Athletics
- Event: Hammer throw

Enrique Samuells Ricardo (born 20 September 1938) is a retired Cuban athlete who specialised in the hammer throw. He won several medals at regional level.

His personal best in the event is 68.78 set in Sofia in 1968.

== International competitions ==
Year	Competition	Venue	Position	Event	Notes
Representing Cuba
1962	Central American and Caribbean Games	Kingston, Jamaica	1st	Hammer throw	54.15 m
1962	Ibero-American Games	Madrid, Spain	3rd	Hammer throw	54.11 m
1963	Pan American Games	São Paulo, Brazil	4th	Hammer throw	56.21 m
1966	Central American and Caribbean Games	San Juan, Puerto Rico	1st	Hammer throw	68.11 m
1967	Central American and Caribbean Championships	Xalapa, Mexico	1st	Hammer throw	66.06 m
1967	Pan American Games	Winnipeg, Canada	2nd	Hammer throw	64.66 m
