= Athletics at the 1955 Pan American Games – Women's discus throw =

Women's discus throw at the Pan American Games

The women's discus throw event at the 1955 Pan American Games was held at the Estadio Universitario in Mexico City on 15 March.

== Results ==
Rank	Name	Nationality	Result	Notes
1st place, gold medalist(s)	Ingeborg Pfüller	Argentina	43.19	GR
2nd place, silver medalist(s)	Isabel Avellán	Argentina	40.06	
3rd place, bronze medalist(s)	Alejandrina Herrera	Cuba	38.00	
4	Lili Schluter	Mexico	37.43	
5	Jackie MacDonald	Canada	37.33	
6	Marjorie Larney	United States	34.97	
7	Marie Dupree	Canada	34.37	
8	Pam Kurrell	United States	33.59	
9	Sharon Cliffe	Canada	32.52	
10	Vera Trezoitko	Brazil	32.14	
11	Patricia Mosanto	United States	31.77	
	Ana Campos	El Salvador	DNS	
