= Athletics at the 1955 Pan American Games – Men's 3000 metres steeplechase =

Men's 3,000 metres steeplechase at the Pan American Games

The men's 3000 metres steeplechase event at the 1955 Pan American Games was held at the Estadio Universitario in Mexico City on 18 March.

== Results ==
Rank	Name	Nationality	Time	Notes
1st place, gold medalist(s)	Guillermo Solá	Chile	9:46.8	
2nd place, silver medalist(s)	Santiago Novas	Chile	9:50.4	
3rd place, bronze medalist(s)	Eligio Galicia	Mexico	9:54.2	
4	Edgard Mitt	Brazil	10:04.6	
5	Luciano Gómez	Mexico	10:14.0	
6	Ezequiel García	Mexico	10:27.2	
7	Víctor Solares	Guatemala	??:??.?	
	Eleutorio Martínez	Guatemala	?	
	José Escobedo	Guatemala	?	
	Bill Ashenfelter	United States	DNF	
	Horace Ashenfelter	United States	DNS	
