= Athletics at the 1963 Summer Universiade – Men's hammer throw =

The men's hammer throw event at the 1963 Summer Universiade was held at the Estádio Olímpico Monumental in Porto Alegre in September 1963.

The winning margin was 4 cm which was also the winning margin in this event at the 1959 edition of these games. As of 2024, these remain the only two occasions where the men's hammer throw has been won by such a narrow margin.

== Results ==
Rank	Athlete	Nationality	Result	Notes
1st place, gold medalist(s)	Gennadiy Kondrashov	Soviet Union	65.76	
2nd place, silver medalist(s)	Gyula Zsivótzky	Hungary	65.72	
3rd place, bronze medalist(s)	Masatoshi Wakabayashi	Japan	60.90	
4	Heinrich Liewald	West Germany	59.76	
5	Koji Oshita	Japan	58.86	
6	Ennio Boschini	Italy	57.58	
7	Roberto Chapchap	Brazil	52.09	
8	Ceferino Andara	Venezuela	44.56	
