= Athletics at the 1961 Summer Universiade – Women's discus throw =

The women's discus throw event at the 1961 Summer Universiade was held at the Vasil Levski National Stadium in Sofia, Bulgaria, in September 1961.

== Results ==
| Rank | Athlete | Nationality | Result | Notes |
|---|---|---|---|---|
| 1st place, gold medalist(s) | Tamara Press | Soviet Union | 58.06 | |
| 2nd place, silver medalist(s) | Antonina Popova | Soviet Union | 53.82 | |
| 3rd place, bronze medalist(s) | Jolan Kontsek | Hungary | 52.51 | |
| 4 | Lia Manoliu | Romania | 51.51 | |
| 5 | Elivia Ricci | Italy | 48.16 | |
| 6 | Vania Veleva | Bulgaria | 45.47 | |
| 7 | Ivanka Khristova | Bulgaria | 44.60 | |
| 8 | Seiko Obonai | Japan | 43.83 | |
| 9 | Alejandrina Herrera | Cuba | 39.99 | |
| 10 | Almut Brömmel | West Germany | 39.27 | |
