= Bertha Chiu =

Mexican javelin thrower and multi-sport athlete (1933–2009)

Personal information
- Full name: Bertha Chiu Núñez
- Born: 22 August 1933 Chihuahua City, Mexico
- Died: 16 September 2009 (aged 76) Ciudad Juárez, Mexico

Sport
- Sport: Athletics, basketball, softball
- Events: Javelin throw, discus throw

Bertha Chiu Núñez (22 August 1933 – 16 September 2009) was a Mexican athlete who specilaised in the javelin throw. She won multiple medals at regional level including bronze at the 1951 Pan American Games. In addition to athletics she also practised basketball and softball.

== International competitions ==
Year	Competition	Venue	Position	Event	Notes
Representing Mexico
1950	Central American and Caribbean Games	Guatemala City, Guatemala	2nd	Javelin throw	34.33 m
1951	Pan American Games	Buenos Aires, Argentina	11th	Discus throw	28.31 m
1951	Pan American Games	Buenos Aires, Argentina	3rd	Javelin throw	37.97 m
1954	Central American and Caribbean Games	Mexico City, Mexico	9th	Discus throw	28.69 m
1954	Central American and Caribbean Games	Mexico City, Mexico	2nd	Javelin throw	38.43 m
1955	Pan American Games	Mexico City, Mexico	7th	Javelin throw	36.69 m
1959	Central American and Caribbean Games	Caracas, Venezuela	4th	Discus throw	30.74 m
1959	Central American and Caribbean Games	Caracas, Venezuela	1st	Javelin throw	35.21 m
1960	Ibero-American Games	Santiago, Chile	–	High jump	NM
1960	Ibero-American Games	Santiago, Chile	7th	Long jump	4.77 m
1962	Central American and Caribbean Games	Kingston, Jamaica	3rd	Javelin throw	35.63 m
