= Athletics at the 1959 Pan American Games – Men's hammer throw =

Men's hammer throw at the Pan American Games

The men's hammer throw event at the 1959 Pan American Games was held at the Soldier Field in Chicago on 28 August.

== Results ==
| Rank | Name | Nationality | Result | Notes |
|---|---|---|---|---|
| 1st place, gold medalist(s) | Al Hall | United States | 59.73 | |
| 2nd place, silver medalist(s) | Hal Connolly | United States | 59.72 | |
| 3rd place, bronze medalist(s) | Bob Backus | United States | 59.60 | |
| 4 | Roberto Chapchap | Brazil | 55.80 | |
| 5 | Bruno Strohmeier | Brazil | 54.01 | |
| 6 | Daniel Cereali | Venezuela | 52.73 | |
| 7 | Alejandro Díaz | Chile | 51.34 | |
| 8 | Francisco Fragoso | Mexico | 46.26 | |
| 9 | Mauricio Rodríguez | Venezuela | 40.21 | |
| 10 | Stan Raike | Canada | 38.16 | |
| | John Pavelich | Canada | DNS | |
| | Lambertus Rebel-Bout | Netherlands Antilles | DNS | |
| | Ramón Rosario | Puerto Rico | DNS | |
