= Luis Vienna =

Personal information
- Born: Luis Norberto Vienna; 25 May 1938

Sport
- Sport: Sprinting
- Event(s): 100 metres, 200 metres

Luis Norberto Vienna (born 25 May 1938) is a retired Argentine sprinter who once held the national record in the 200 metres. He won several medals at regional level.

== International competitions ==
Year	Competition	Venue	Position	Event	Notes
Representing Argentina
1956	South American Championships	Santiago, Chile	4th	100 m	10.7
1956	South American Championships	Santiago, Chile	2nd	4 × 100 m relay	41.5
1958	South American Championships	Montevideo, Uruguay	2nd	100 m	10.6
1958	South American Championships	Montevideo, Uruguay	3rd (h)	200 m	22.4^{1}
1958	South American Championships	Montevideo, Uruguay	3rd	4 × 100 m relay	41.8
1959	South American Championships (unofficial)	São Paulo, Brazil	2nd	100 m	10.6
1959	South American Championships (unofficial)	São Paulo, Brazil	2nd	200 m	21.8
1959	South American Championships (unofficial)	São Paulo, Brazil	3rd	4 × 100 m relay	44.1
1959	Pan American Games	Chicago, United States	15th (sf)	100 m	10.8
1959	Pan American Games	Chicago, United States	6th (h)	200 m	21.9
1960	Ibero-American Games	Santiago, Chile	3rd	100 m	10.4
1960	Ibero-American Games	Santiago, Chile	5th	4 × 100 m relay	42.3
1961	South American Championships	Lima, Peru	5th	100 m	10.9
1961	South American Championships	Lima, Peru	3rd	200 m	21.8
1961	South American Championships	Lima, Peru	3rd	4 × 100 m relay	42.2
1961	South American Championships	Lima, Peru	2nd	4 × 400 m relay	3:16.9
1962	Ibero-American Games	Madrid, Spain	4th (h)	100 m	10.9^{1}
1962	Ibero-American Games	Madrid, Spain	2nd	200 m	21.4
1962	Ibero-American Games	Madrid, Spain	3rd	4 × 100 m relay	41.6

^{1}Disqualified in the semifinals

== Personal bests ==
- 100 metres – 10.4h (Buenos Aires 1958)
- 200 metres – 21.0h (Buenos Aires 1961) former NR
