= Athletics at the 1963 Pan American Games – Men's discus throw =

Men's discus throw at the Pan American Games

The men's discus throw event at the 1963 Pan American Games was held at the Pacaembu Stadium in São Paulo on 28 April.

== Results ==
Rank	Name	Nationality	Result	Notes
1st place, gold medalist(s)	Bob Humphreys	United States	57.82	
2nd place, silver medalist(s)	Dave Davis	United States	51.05	
3rd place, bronze medalist(s)	Ben Rebel Bout	Netherlands Antilles	49.78	
4	Modesto Mederos	Cuba	48.22	
5	Héctor Menacho	Peru	47.60	
6	João Alexandre	Brazil	45.16	
7	Cozme Di Cursi	Argentina	44.02	
8	Claudio Romanini	Brazil	43.63	
	Hernán Haddad	Chile	DNS	
