= Pradelia Delgado =

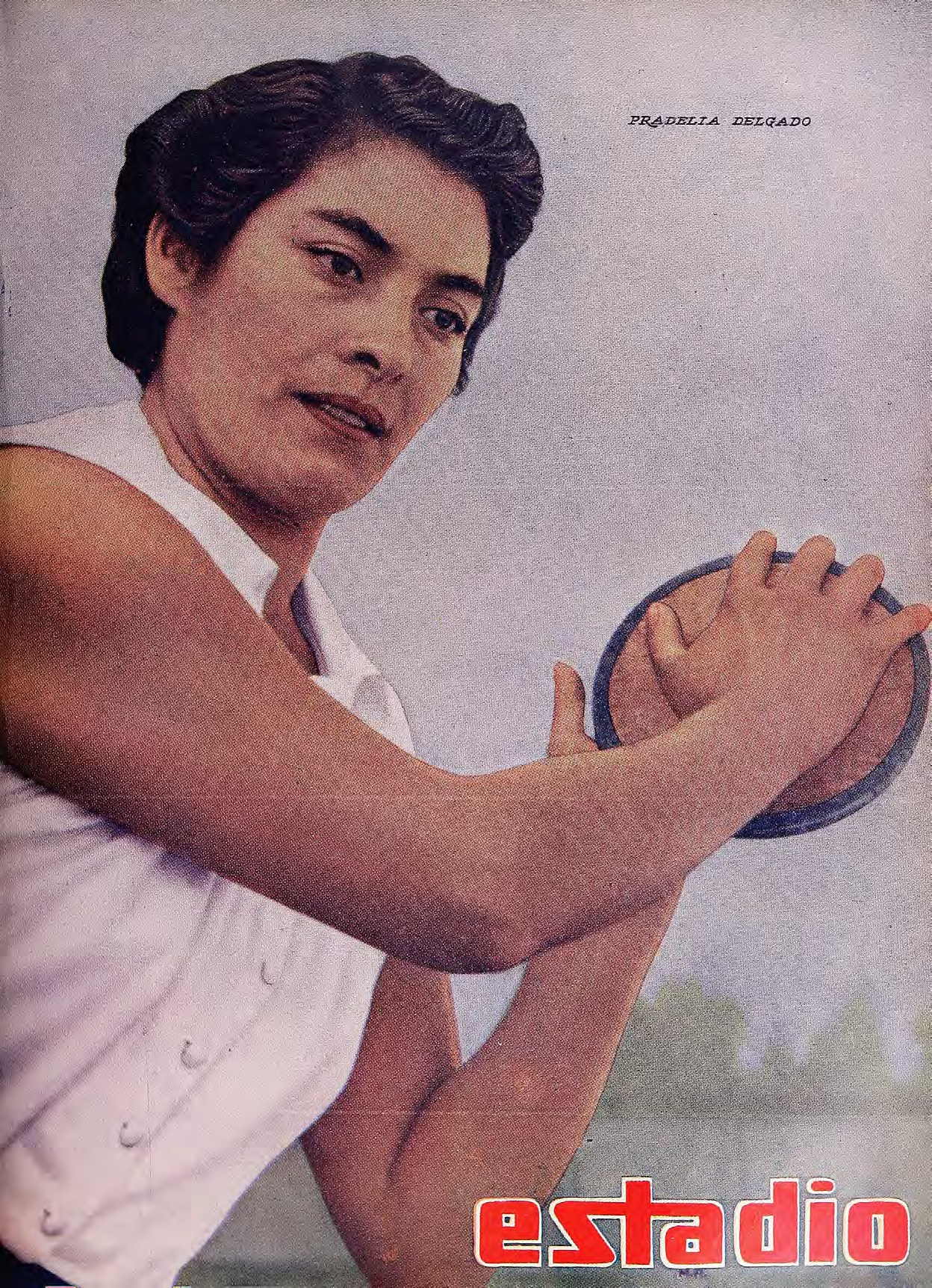
- 1954

Personal information
- Full name: Pradelia Delgado Ojeda
- Born: 8 October 1926 Paillaco, Chile
- Died: 11 May 2012 (aged 85)
- Height: 1.60 m (5 ft 3 in)
- Weight: 78 kg (172 lb)

Sport
- Sport: Athletics
- Events: Discus throw, shot put

Pradelia Delgado Ojeda (born 8 October 1926 – 11 May 2012) was a Chilean athlete who specialised in the shot put and discus throw. She won several medals at regional level.

== International competitions ==
Year	Competition	Venue	Position	Event	Notes
Representing Chile
1953	South American Championships (unofficial)	Santiago, Chile	5th	Shot put	11.03 m
1953	South American Championships (unofficial)	Santiago, Chile	5th	Discus throw	35.24 m
1954	South American Championships	São Paulo, Brazil	2nd	Shot put	11.70 m
1954	South American Championships	São Paulo, Brazil	3rd	Discus throw	38.23 m
1956	South American Championships	Santiago, Chile	2nd	Shot put	11.84 m
1956	South American Championships	Santiago, Chile	6th	Discus throw	36.97 m
1958	South American Championships	Montevideo, Uruguay	4th	Shot put	11.50 m
1958	South American Championships	Montevideo, Uruguay	2nd	Discus throw	39.68 m
1959	Pan American Games	Chicago, United States	5th	Shot put	12.05 m
1959	Pan American Games	Chicago, United States	5th	Discus throw	39.56 m
1960	Ibero-American Games	Santiago, Chile	1st	Shot put	12.17 m
1960	Ibero-American Games	Santiago, Chile	2nd	Discus throw	39.78 m
1961	South American Championships	Lima, Peru	3rd	Shot put	11.81 m
1961	South American Championships	Lima, Peru	2nd	Discus throw	39.78 m
1962	Ibero-American Games	Madrid, Spain	3rd	Shot put	12.35 m
1962	Ibero-American Games	Madrid, Spain	4th	Discus throw	40.62 m
1967	South American Championships	Buenos Aires, Argentina	8th	Shot put	10.69 m
1967	South American Championships	Buenos Aires, Argentina	2nd	Discus throw	38.80 m
1969	South American Championships	Quito, Ecuador	5th	Discus throw	38.12 m

== Personal bests ==
- Shot put – 12.98 (1956)
- Discus throw – 43.08 (1956)
