= Ariel Standen =

Chilean senior athlete, lived from 1929–2026

Ariel Standen Levis was a Chilean senior athlete champion. He was the first Chilean senior athlete to win a world senior title.

== Career ==
Standen was born on September 12, 1929, in Punta Arenas, the son of Methodist minister Carlos Standen and Nelly Levis. He spent his childhood in Temuco, Coquimbo, La Serena and Iquique. His first steps on athletics started in the local high school of Iquique "Iquique English College", guided by his teacher José Scarzolo in the track and field and jumping. His first competition was in 1947 in Coquimbo. Without a pause, he competed from 1947 to 1962, winning 100 regional and zonal titles. Besides, he won several trophies, diplomas and medals.

In 1953, Standen was nominated to join the national pre-team for the sudamerican Tournament in Brazil. After being accepted, he competed with the champion and record of the world Adhemar Ferreira Da Silva. His career was abruptly stopped in 1962 when he retired from athletics and from the national team due to problems with the federation about.

== Triumphs ==
On October 13, 1993, at the age of 64, Standen came back and achieved the senior athletics Championship in Miyazaki, Japan in the 300 meters hurdles. Then he won a bronze medal in the triple jump and 400 meters hurdles. Proud of being the first Chilean senior athlete champion, Standen gave thanks to Jorge Soria's collaboration (mayor of Iquique in that time) and the club "Academia de Educación Física" who afforded his stay in Japan.

Later, in January 1994 he was given "the Cóndor" prize, by Círculo de Periodistas Deportivos de Chile and in 1995 he repeated his world titles in Buffalo, USA, then in 1997 in Durbai, South Africa. He got one of the first places in 100- and 300-meter hurdles and decathlon.

Besides these triumphs, he won 15 South American senior titles in the categories of 55, 60 and 65 years old.

Standen died on August 23, 2026.

== International competitions ==
Year	Competition	Venue	Position	Event	Notes
Representing Chile
1954	South American Championships	São Paulo, Brazil	9th (h)	110 m hurdles	15.5 s
1954	South American Championships	São Paulo, Brazil	7th	Long jump	6.53 m
1956	South American Championships	Santiago, Chile	6th	110 m hurdles	15.7 s
1956	South American Championships	Santiago, Chile	11th (h)	400 m hurdles	57.3 s
1957	South American Championships (unofficial)	Santiago, Chile	6th	400 m hurdles	58.9 s
1957	South American Championships (unofficial)	Santiago, Chile	2nd	Triple jump	14.60 m
1958	South American Championships	Montevideo, Uruguay	10th (h)	110 m hurdles	15.9 s
1958	South American Championships	Montevideo, Uruguay	4th	Triple jump	14.51 m
1959	South American Championships (unofficial)	São Paulo, Brazil	3rd	Triple jump	14.66 m
1960	Ibero-American Games	Santiago, Chile	12th (h)	110 m hurdles	16.2 s
1960	Ibero-American Games	Santiago, Chile	5th	Triple jump	14.92 m
1961	South American Championships	Lima, Peru	5th	110 m hurdles	15.7 s
1961	South American Championships	Lima, Peru	6th	400 m hurdles	60.3 s

== Personal bests ==
- Triple jump – 14.92 (1960)
