= Athletics at the 1951 Pan American Games – Women's javelin throw =

Women's javelin throw at the Pan American Games

The women's javelin throw event at the 1951 Pan American Games was held at the Estadio Monumental in Buenos Aires on 28 February.

Hortensia López García finished 5th in the preliminary round and advanced to the final, winning the women's javelin throw with a distance of 39.45m. Her performance was challenged that same day by the Panama athletics delegation, which claimed that only the top 4 athletes should have advanced to the final instead of the top 6. García's finals performance was briefly discounted, moving Judith Caballero of Panama up to the bronze medal position, but it was reinstated the next day. Some sources still list García's preliminary round mark of 32.68m as her final result.

== Results ==
Rank	Name	Nationality	Result	Notes
1st place, gold medalist(s)	Hortensia López	Mexico	39.45	
2nd place, silver medalist(s)	Amelia Bert	United States	38.08	
3rd place, bronze medalist(s)	Bertha Chiú	Mexico	37.97	
4	Judith Caballero	Panama	37.78	
5	Ursula Holle	Chile	35.26	
6	Anneliese Schmidt	Brazil	33.30	
7	Vera Trezoitko	Brazil	29.57	
