= 1959 South American Championships in Athletics (unofficial) =

Unofficial South American Championships in Athletics
- Dates: 22-24 May 1959
- Host city: São Paulo, Brazil
- Venue: Pacaembu Stadium
- Level: Senior
- Events: 22
- Participation: 3 nations

Unofficial South American Championships in Athletics (II Torneo de Campeones Sudamericanos) were held in São Paulo, Brazil on 22, 23 and 24 May 1959. The athletics meeting was for men only with the participation from three countries Argentina, Brazil and Chile, each represented by two athletes in an event competing for points. It was the second and last edition of Tournament of South American Champions where countries competed for the es:Guillermo García-Huidobro Prize.

== Medal summary ==
=== Men ===
Event	Gold		Silver		Bronze	
100 metres	José Telles da Conceição (BRA)	10.5	Luis Vienna (ARG)	10.6	Jorge de Barros (BRA)	10.8
200 metres	José Telles da Conceição (BRA)	21.4	Luis Vienna (ARG)	21.8	Jorge de Barros (BRA)	22.1
400 metres	Anubes da Silva (BRA)	49.0	Peter Ostermeier (BRA)	49.1	Víctor Lozano (ARG)	49.8
800 metres	Ramón Sandoval (CHI)	1:54.1	Manuel da Silva (BRA)	1:54.7	Hugo Krauss (CHI)	1:55.4
1500 metres	Ramón Sandoval (CHI)	3:57.8	Manuel da Silva (BRA)	3:58.9	Gilberto Miori (ARG)	3:59.3
5000 metres	Luis Sandoval (ARG)	15:01.4	Ricardo Vidal (CHI)	15:06.2	José Calixto (BRA)	15:10.8
10,000 metres	Luis Sandoval (ARG)	31:46.4	Luis Campusano (CHI)	31:58.7	José Calixto (BRA)	32:11.4
Marathon	Juan Silva (CHI)	2:36:15	José Campos (BRA)	2:41:57	Enrique Tapia (CHI)	2:45:20
110 metres hurdles	Wilson Carneiro (BRA)	14.8	Francisco Bergonzoni (BRA)	15.2	Estanislao Kocourek (ARG)	15.2
400 metres hurdles	Anubes da Silva (BRA)	54.4	Ulisses dos Santos (BRA)	54.6	Jorge Bolados (CHI)	55.8
3000 metres steeplechase	Francisco Allen (CHI)	9:05.5 AR	Alberto Ríos (ARG)	9:10.3	Santiago Novas (CHI)	9:11.5
4 × 100 metres relay	Brazil; Affonso da Silva; Jorge de Barros; Paulo da Fonseca; José Telles da Conceição	41.2	Chile; Juan Mouat; Hugo Krauss; Hugo de la Fuente; Eduardo Krumm	42.6	Argentina; Juan Carlos Salom; Roberto Ferrario; Gerardo Bönnhoff; Luis Vienna	44.1
4 × 400 metres relay	Brazil; Ulisses dos Santos; Anubes da Silva; Argemiro Roque; Peter Ostermeier	3:16.5	Chile; César Pinilla; José Gallegos; Jorge Bolados; Hugo Krauss	3:22.2	Argentina; Fernández; Francisco Paganessi; Ricardo Grecca; Víctor Lozano	3:26.4
High jump	Juan Ruiz (CHI)	1.90	Hans Ackermann (BRA)	1.85	Horacio Martínez (ARG)	1.80
Pole vault	José Luis Infante (CHI)	3.90	Tomatsu Nishida (BRA)	3.80	Mario Eleusippi (ARG)	3.70
Long jump	Carlos Tornquist (CHI)	7.19	Eduardo Krumm (CHI)	7.10	Luís Akuta (BRA)	7.09
Triple jump	Adhemar da Silva (BRA)	15.69	Reinaldo de Oliveira (BRA)	14.73	Ariel Standen (CHI)	14.66
Shot put	Enrique Helf (ARG)	15.68	Leonardo Kittsteiner (CHI)	14.61	Isolino Taborda (BRA)	14.57
Discus throw	Hernán Haddad (CHI)	48.17	Enrique Helf (ARG)	45.64	Horacio Beluardo (ARG)	44.65
Hammer throw	Bruno Strohmeier (BRA)	56.06	Alejandro Díaz (CHI)	51.81	Roberto Chapchap (BRA)	51.00
Javelin throw	Ricardo Héber (ARG)	65.85	Nelson Matteucci (ARG)	62.43	L. Marcelino (BRA)	57.40
Decathlon	Juris Laipenieks (CHI)	5658	Emir Martínez (ARG)	5637	Luís Fernandes (BRA)	5279

== Medal table (unofficial) ==
* Host nation (Chile)

Rank	Nation	Gold	Silver	Bronze	Total
1	Brazil (BRA)	9	9	9	27
2	Chile (CHI)*	9	7	5	21
3	Argentina (ARG)	4	6	8	18
Totals (3 entries)		22	22	22	66

== Team scores (official) ==
Rank	Country	Points
1	Brazil	237 pts
3	Chile	220 pts
2	Argentina	163 pts
