= Júlio Fernandes =

Brazilian footballer

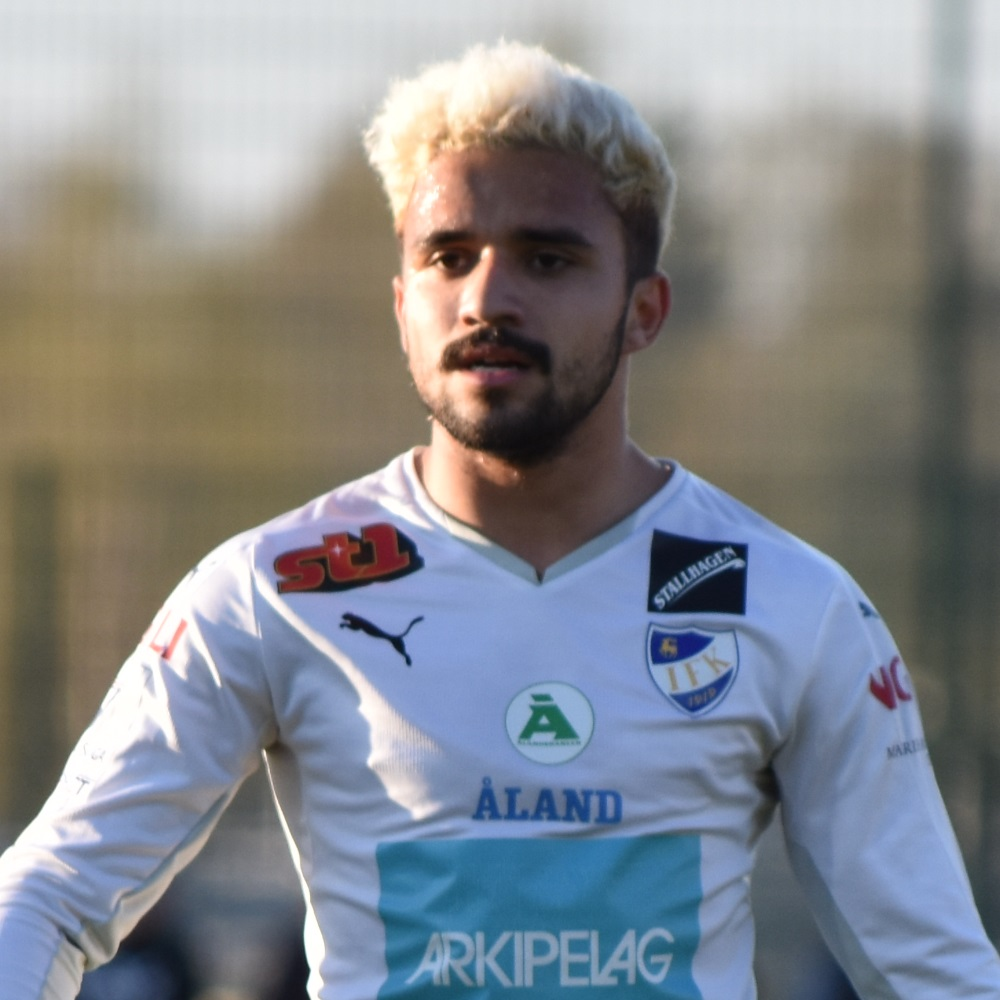

Personal information
- Full name: Júlio César Fernandes
- Date of birth: 9 November 1996 (age 30)
- Place of birth: Curitiba, Brazil
- Height: 1.66 m (5 ft 5 in)
- Position: Midfielder

Team information
- Current team: KFA

Youth career
- Bragantino
- Arapongas
- Estanciano

Senior career*
Years	Team	Apps	(Gls)
- Apucarana Sports
2016–2017	Junior Team		
2018	IFK Mariehamn	17	(2)
2019	Gefle IF	25	(3)
2020–	Ytterhogdals IK	9	(8)
2022–	KF	20	(16)
2023	Reynir S	21	(7)
2024–	KFA	6	(2)
- * Club domestic league appearances and goals as of 11:33, 22 June 2024 (UTC)

Júlio César Fernandes (born 9 November 1996) is a Brazilian professional footballer who plays for Icelandic third-tier club KFA, as a midfielder.
