= Manuel Jordan =

Manuel Jordan (1853-1919) was a Puerto Rican painter and musician.
