= 1962 Ibero-American Games =

II Ibero-American Games
- Dates: October 7–12, 1962
- Host city: Madrid, Spain
- Venue: Estadio de Vallehermoso
- Level: Senior
- Events: 31 (22 men, 9 women)
- Participation: 265 athletes from 18 nations

The 1962 Ibero-American Games were held at the Estadio de Vallehermoso in Madrid, Spain, between October 7–12, 1962.

A total of 31 events were contested, 22 by men and 9 by women.

== Medal summary ==
Medal winners were published.

=== Men ===
Event	Gold		Silver		Bronze	
100 metres	Rafael Romero (VEN)	10.6	Manuel Rivera (PUR)	10.9	Affonso da Silva (BRA)	11.1
200 metres	Rafael Romero (VEN)	21.1	Luis Vienna (ARG)	21.4	Arquímedes Herrera (VEN)	21.6
400 metres	Germán Guenard (PUR)	47.3	Juan Carlos Dyrzka (ARG)	48.1	Juan Francisco Aguilar (URU)	48.3
800 metres	Alberto Estebán (ESP)	1:50.2	José Luis Martínez (ESP)	1:50.5	José Neira (COL)	1:50.7
1500 metres	Manuel Oliveira (POR)	3:52.7	Tomás Barris (ESP)	3:53.4	Osvaldo Suárez (ARG)	3:53.4
5000 metres	Osvaldo Suárez (ARG)	14:31.6	Manuel Oliveira (POR)	14:32.4	Mariano Haro (ESP)	14:38.2
10,000 metres	Osvaldo Suárez (ARG)	30:14.2	Mariano Haro (ESP)	30:22.4	Carlos Pérez (ESP)	30:57.6
Marathon	Armando Aldegalega (POR)	2:30:09	Álvaro Conde (POR)	2:32:18	Jaime Guixá (ESP)	2:32:54
110 metres hurdles	José Telles da Conceição (BRA)	14.7	Carlos Mossa (BRA)	14.8	Teófilo Davis Bell (VEN)	14.9
400 metres hurdles	Juan Carlos Dyrzka (ARG)	50.9	Víctor Maldonado (VEN)	51.9	Anubes da Silva (BRA)	53.0
3000 metres steeplechase	Domingo Amaisón (ARG)	9:02.6	Manuel Oliveira (POR)	9:05.2	Sebastião Mendes (BRA)	9:16.4
4 × 100 metres relay	Brazil; Joe Satow; Joel Costa; Affonso da Silva; José Telles da Conceição	41.2	Venezuela; Arquímedes Herrera; Lloyd Murad; Andrés Fawre; Rafael Romero	41.6	Argentina; Raúl Zabala; Carlos Biondi; Juan Bagnoli; Luis Vienna	41.6
4 × 400 metres relay	Venezuela; Arístides Pineda; Lloyd Murad; Víctor Maldonado; Hortensio Fucil	3:15.4	Puerto Rico; Enrique Montalvo; José Luis Villalongo; Gilberto Faberlle; Germán Guenard	3:16.4	Brazil; Ulisses dos Santos; José Telles da Conceição; Joel Rocha; Anubes da Silva	3:16.5
High jump	Teodoro Palacios (GUA)	2.00	Roberto Abugattás (PER)	1.97	Júlio Fernandes (POR)	1.94
Pole vault	Rolando Cruz (PUR)	4.50	Rubén Cruz (PUR)	4.20	Mario Eleusippi (ARG)	4.15
Long jump	Luis Felipe Areta (ESP)	7.52	Pedro de Almeida (POR)	7.48	Juan Muñoz (VEN)	7.33
Triple jump	Luis Felipe Areta (ESP)	15.07	Rumildo Cruz (PUR)	14.63	Víctor Hernández (CUB)	14.61
Shot put	Enrique Helf (ARG)	16.06	Cosme Di Cursi (ARG)	15.96	Antonio Lamua (ESP)	14.92
Discus throw	Enrique Helf (ARG)	49.38	Dieter Gevert (CHI)	47.52	Ignacio Reinosa (PUR)	47.00
Hammer throw	Eduardo Albuquerque (POR)	55.37	José María Elorriaga (ESP)	55.24	Enrique Samuells (CUB)	54.11
Javelin throw	Alfonso de Andrés (ESP)	68.17	Ricardo Héber (ARG)	65.36	Jesús Rodríguez (VEN)	64.68
Decathlon	Héctor Thomas (VEN)	6630	Roberto Caravaca (VEN)	6133	Cleomenes da Cunha (BRA)	6000

=== Women ===
Event	Gold		Silver		Bronze	
100 metres	Miguelina Cobián (CUB)	12.3	Erica da Silva (BRA)	12.3	Nancy Correa (CHI)	12.4
200 metres	Miguelina Cobián (CUB)	25.3	Erica da Silva (BRA)	25.5	Ada Brener (ARG)	26.3
80 metres hurdles	Wanda dos Santos (BRA)	11.5	Graciela Paviotti (ARG)	11.5	Leda dos Santos (BRA)	11.9
4 × 100 metres relay	Chile; Gloria Mund; Carlota Ulloa; Nancy Correa; Marisol Massot	48.7	Argentina; Marta Buongiorno; Ada Brener; Emilia Dyrzka; Margarita Formeiro	48.9	Brazil; Wanda dos Santos; Wanda Moreira; Leda dos Santos; Erica da Silva	49.4
High jump	Aída dos Santos (BRA)	1.56	Maria da Conceição (BRA)	1.54	Smiljana Dezulovic (CHI)	1.48
Long jump	Mabel Farina (ARG)	5.58	Graciela Paviotti (ARG)	5.55	Gisela Vidal (VEN)	5.40
Shot put	Vera Trezoitko (BRA)	12.84	Ingeborg Pfüller (ARG)	12.54	Pradelia Delgado (CHI)	12.35
Discus throw	Ingeborg Pfüller (ARG)	44.69	Caridad Agüero (CUB)	44.27	Myriam Yutronic (CHI)	42.38
Javelin throw	Marlene Ahrens (CHI)	45.63	Maria Ventura (BRA)	42.24	Magdalena García (ARG)	38.97

== Medal table (unofficial) ==
* Host nation (Spain)

Rank	Nation	Gold	Silver	Bronze	Total
1	Argentina (ARG)	8	8	5	21
2	Brazil (BRA)	5	5	7	17
3	Spain (ESP)*	4	4	4	12
4	Venezuela (VEN)	4	3	5	12
5	Portugal (POR)	3	4	1	8
6	Puerto Rico (PUR)*	2	4	1	7
7	Chile (CHI)	2	1	4	7
8	Cuba (CUB)	2	1	2	5
9	Guatemala (GUA)	1	0	0	1
10	Peru (PER)	0	1	0	1
11	Colombia (COL)	0	0	1	1
11	Uruguay (URU)	0	0	1	1
Totals (12 entries)		31	31	31	93

== Team trophies ==
The placing table for team trophy awarded to the 1st place overall team (men and women) was published. Overall winner was Argentina, winner at the men's competition was Venezuela, and Brazil won the title in the women's category.

=== Overall ===
The host country is highlighted in lavender blue

Rank	Nation	Points
1st place, gold medalist(s)	Argentina	186
2	Brazil	157
3	Venezuela	126
4	Spain	120
5	Portugal	88
6	Puerto Rico	79
7	Chile	75
8	Cuba	38
9	Guatemala	12
10	Uruguay	11
11	Colombia	10
12	(Peru) Perú	9

== Participation ==
According to an unofficial count there was a total number of 265 athletes from 18 countries.

- Argentina (32)
- Bolivia (1)
- Brazil (30)
- Chile (30)
- Colombia (7)
- Costa Rica (4)
- Cuba (13)
- Dominican Republic (2)
- Ecuador (5)
- Guatemala (2)
- Paraguay (5)
- Peru (11)
- Portugal (31)
- Puerto Rico (20)
- El Salvador (2)
- Spain (39)
- Uruguay (10)
- Venezuela (21)
