= Manuel de Oliveira =

Portuguese long-distance runner

Personal information
- Full name: Manuel Figueiredo de Oliveira
- Nationality: Portuguese
- Born: 20 October 1940 Mangualde, Portugal
- Died: 19 October 2017 (aged 76) Lisbon, Portugal
- Height: 1.71 m (5 ft 7 in)
- Weight: 59 kg (130 lb)

Sport
- Sport: Long-distance running
- Event: 5000 metres
Medal record
Men's Athletics
Representing Portugal
Ibero-American Games
Bronze medal – third place	1960 Santiago	5000 metres

Manuel Figueiredo de Oliveira (20 October 1940 – 19 October 2017) was a Portuguese long-distance runner. He competed in the men's 5000 metres at the 1960 Summer Olympics.

== Personal bests ==
- 5000 metres – 13:50.8h (1968)
- 3000 metres steeplechase – 8:36.2h (1964)
