= Pedro de Almeida (athlete) =

Portuguese long jumper

Personal information
- Full name: Pedro João Röthe Marques de Almeida
- Nationality: Portuguese
- Born: 3 September 1939 Buckow, Brandenburg, Germany
- Died: 22 September 2012 (aged 73)
- Height: 1.85 m (6 ft 1 in)
- Weight: 78 kg (172 lb)

Sport
- Sport: Athletics
- Event: Long jump
- Club: Sporting CP

Pedro de Almeida (3 September 1939 – 22 September 2012) was a Portuguese athlete. He competed in the men's long jump at the 1960 Summer Olympics.

== Personal bests ==
- Long jump – 7.62 m (1962)
