= Alejandrina Herrera =

Cuban discus thrower

Personal information
- Full name: Alejandrina Herrera Ylarra
- Born: 21 April 1928 (Note: Some sources give 1924.) Artemisa, Cuba
- Died: 1987 Havana, Cuba

Sport
- Sport: Athletics
- Event: Discus throw
Medal record
Women's athletics
Representing Cuba
Pan American Games
Bronze medal – third place	1955 Mexico City	Discus throw
Central American and Caribbean Games
Gold medal – first place	1954 Mexico City	Discus throw
Silver medal – second place	1950 Guatemala City	Discus throw
Silver medal – second place	1962 Kingston	Discus throw

Alejandrina Herrera Ylarra (21 April 1928 or 1924 – 1987) was a Cuban discus thrower.

She won several medals at regional level including a bronze medal at the 1955 Pan American Games.

Her personal best in the event was 40.84 metres set in Havana in 1962. She was the first Cuban woman to throw the discus over 40 metres achieved in 1956.

== International competitions ==
Year	Competition	Venue	Position	Event	Notes
Representing Cuba
1950	Central American and Caribbean Games	Guatemala City, Guatemala	2nd	Discus throw	31.78 m
1954	Central American and Caribbean Games	Mexico City, Mexico	1st	Discus throw	37.18 m
1954	Central American and Caribbean Games	Mexico City, Mexico	9th	Javelin throw	30.38 m
1955	Pan American Games	Mexico City, Mexico	3rd	Discus throw	38.00 m
1959	Pan American Games	Chicago, United States	8th	High jump	1.45 m
1959	Pan American Games	Chicago, United States	4th	Discus throw	40.81 m
1960	Ibero-American Games	Santiago, Chile	8th	Shot put	10.20 m
1960	Ibero-American Games	Santiago, Chile	5th	Discus throw	38.54 m
1961	Universiade	Sofia, Bulgaria	9th	Discus throw	39.99 m
1962	Central American and Caribbean Games	Kingston, Jamaica	2nd	Discus throw	38.70 m
