= Armando Aldegalega =

Portuguese long-distance runner

Personal information
- Nationality: Portuguese
- Born: 23 November 1937 (age 87) Setúbal, Portugal

Sport
- Sport: Long-distance running
- Event: Marathon

Armando Aldegalega (born 23 November 1937) is a Portuguese former long-distance runner. He competed in the marathon at the 1964 Summer Olympics and the 1972 Summer Olympics.
