= Vera Trezoitko =

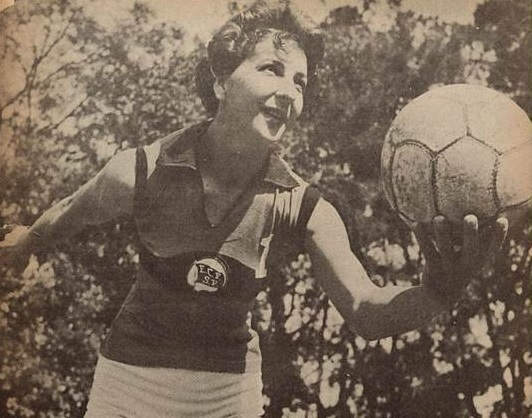

Personal information
- Born: 18 December 1928 (age 97) São Paulo, Brazil
- Died: 23 December 1993 (aged 65)
- Height: 1.71 m (5 ft 7 in)

Sport
- Sport: Athletics, volleyball
- Position: Outside hitter
- Events: Shot put, discus throw, javelin throw
Medal record
Women's volleyball
Representing Brazil
Pan American Games
Gold medal – first place	1959 Chicago
Gold medal – first place	1963 São Paulo

Vera Trezoitko (18 December 1929 – 23 December 1993) was a Brazilian volleyball player and track and field athlete specialising in the throwing events. She represented her country in four Pan American Games between 1951 and 1963 and won multiple medals for her country in both sports.

== International competitions (athletics) ==
Year	Competition	Venue	Position	Event	Notes
Representing Brazil
1949	South American Championships	Lima, Peru	6th	Shot put	10.71 m
1951	Pan American Games	Buenos Aires, Argentina	2nd	Shot put	11.59 m
1951	Pan American Games	Buenos Aires, Argentina	8th	Discus throw	32.27 m
1951	Pan American Games	Buenos Aires, Argentina	7th	Javelin throw	29.57 m
1952	South American Championships	Buenos Aires, Argentina	5th	Shot put	10.60 m
1953	South American Championships (unofficial)	Santiago, Chile	1st	Shot put	11.91 m
1953	South American Championships (unofficial)	Santiago, Chile	6th	Discus throw	34.36 m
1954	South American Championships	São Paulo, Brazil	3rd	Shot put	11.60 m
1954	South American Championships	São Paulo, Brazil	4th	Discus throw	37.23 m
1954	South American Championships	São Paulo, Brazil	6th	Javelin throw	33.11 m
1955	Pan American Games	Mexico City, Mexico	10th	Discus throw	32.14 m
1958	South American Championships	Montevideo, Uruguay	3rd	Shot put	12.06 m
1958	South American Championships	Montevideo, Uruguay	6th	Javelin throw	37.25 m
1959	Pan American Games	Chicago, United States	4th	Shot put	12.61 m
1961	South American Championships	Lima, Peru	2nd	Shot put	12.16 m
1961	South American Championships	Lima, Peru	3rd	Javelin throw	37.29 m
1962	Ibero-American Games	Madrid, Spain	1st	Shot put	12.84m
1962	Ibero-American Games	Madrid, Spain	9th	Discus throw	35.24 m
1962	Ibero-American Games	Madrid, Spain	6th	Javelin throw	35.15 m
1963	Pan American Games	São Paulo, Brazil	4th	Shot put	12.87 m
1963	South American Championships	Cali, Colombia	2nd	Shot put	12.43 m
1963	South American Championships	Cali, Colombia	4th	Javelin throw	37.63 m
