= Athletics at the 1956 Summer Olympics – Men's 1500 metres =

Men's 1500 metres at the Games of the XVI Olympiad
- Olympic Athletics
- Venue: Melbourne Cricket Ground
- Dates: November 29, 1956 (heats); December 1, 1956 (final)
- Competitors: 37 from 22 nations
- Winning time: 3:41.2 OR

Medalists
1st place, gold medalist(s)		Ron Delany; Ireland
2nd place, silver medalist(s)		Klaus Richtzenhain; United Team of Germany
3rd place, bronze medalist(s)		John Landy; Australia

Video on YouTube Official Video @13:13

The men's 1500 metres was an event at the 1956 Summer Olympics in Melbourne, Australia, with the final held on Saturday, December 1, 1956. There were a total number of 37 participants from 22 nations. The maximum number of athletes per nation had been set at 3 since the 1930 Olympic Congress. The event was won by Ron Delany of Ireland, the nation's first 1500 metres medal. The silver medalist was Klaus Richtzenhain, the only medalist in the event for the United Team of Germany. John Landy took bronze, Australia's first medal in the event since 1896.

== Summary ==
Among the non-qualifiers for the final were defending champion Josy Barthel, future silver medalist Michel Jazy and eventual marathon champion Mamo Wolde.

The final had twelve men toe the line. Uniquely, Murray Halberg used a sprinter's crouched start in lane 1 and sprinted into the lead from the gun. In future years, this kind of start would become forbidden in a long race. Halberg held that lead until there were two laps to go where he was passed in a rush by Mervyn Lincoln running in front of a home crowd. Lincoln held the lead until just after the bell when he was swallowed up by a rush led by Brian Hewson. Ten men went around Lincoln and he was cooked. Klaus Richtzenhain was the next to follow with Halberg making one more rush down the backstretch before he too was cooked. From tenth place, Ron Delany began picking off runners on the backstretch, as Halberg slowed, Delany used the traffic to step into fifth place at the start of the final turn. Passing in lane 2, Delany ran around the field, catching Hewson at the head of the straightaway. Hewson looked helplessly at Delany as he passed. Fighting out of the group Delany passed at the start of the turn, another home town favorite John Landy chased from behind, still in sixth at the head of the straight. With a stiff, upright sprinting style, Delany pulled away from the field. Hewson struggled down the final straight, watching Richtzenhain run past on the outside. Landy made a late final charge in lane 3 but just came up short in trying to catch Richtzenhain for silver.

== Background ==
This was the 13th appearance of the event, which is one of 12 athletics events to have been held at every Summer Olympics. Two finalists from the 1952 Games returned: gold medalist Josy Barthel of Luxembourg and eighth-place finisher Ingvar Ericsson of Sweden. The world record had changed hands six times since the 1952 Games; three of the men who had had it but were surpassed (László Tábori of Hungary, John Landy of Australia, and Gunnar Nielsen of Denmark) competed in Melbourne, along with the man who still held it (István Rózsavölgyi of Hungary). Five men had run a sub-four minute mile; the first to do so (Roger Bannister of Great Britain, who had finished fourth in this event in 1952) had retired, but three of those men (Tábori, Landy, and Brian Hewson, also of Great Britain) competed.

Ethiopia and Pakistan each made their first appearance in the event; Germany competed as the United Team of Germany for the first time. The United States made its 13th appearance, the only nation to have competed in the men's 1500 metres at each Games to that point.

== Competition format ==
After a one-Games stint at three rounds in 1952, the 1956 competition returned to two rounds. There were three heats with 15 runners each (before withdrawals), with the top four runners in each advancing to the typical 12-man final race.

== Records ==
These were the standing world and Olympic records prior to the 1956 Summer Olympics.

World record	István Rózsavölgyi (HUN)	3:40.6	Tata, Hungary	3 August 1956
Olympic record	Josy Barthel (LUX)	3:45.2	Helsinki, Finland	26 July 1952

During the final, Ron Delany set a new Olympic record at 3:41.2. The top ten men in the final all surpassed the old Olympic record; the eleventh man matched it.

== Schedule ==
All times are Australian Eastern Standard Time (UTC+10)

Date	Time	Round
Thursday, 29 November 1956	16:30	Heats
Saturday, 1 December 1956	16:15	Final

== Results ==
=== Heats ===
==== Heat 1 ====
Rank	Athlete	Nation	Time (hand)	Time (automatic)	Notes
1	Klaus Richtzenhain	United Team of Germany	3:46.6	3:46.76	Q
2	Stanislav Jungwirth	Czechoslovakia	3:46.6	3:46.79	Q
3	Ian Boyd	Great Britain	3:47.0	3:47.13	Q
4	Murray Halberg	New Zealand	3:47:2	3:47.39	Q
5	István Rozsavolgyi	Hungary	3:49:4	3:49.54	
6	André Ballieux	Belgium	3:49:8	3:49.94	
7	Michel Jazy	France	3:50:0	3:49.95	
8	Ted Wheeler	United States	3:50:1	3:50.02	
9	Jonas Pipyne	Soviet Union	3:50:6	3:50.86	
10	Josy Barthel	Luxembourg	3:50:6	3:50.64	
11	Mamo Wolde	Ethiopia	3:51:0	–	
—	Jim Bailey	Australia	DNS	–	
—	Phol Jaiswang	Thailand	DNS	–	
—	Dimitrios Konstantinidis	Greece	DNS	–	
—	Joseph Narmath	Liberia	DNS	–	

==== Heat 2 ====
Rank	Athlete	Nation	Time (hand)	Time (automatic)	Notes
1	Mervyn Lincoln	Australia	3:45:4	3:45.63	Q
2	Kenneth Wood	Great Britain	3:46:6	3:46.90	Q
3	Ron Delany	Ireland	3:47.4	3:47.48	Q
4	Laszlo Tabori	Hungary	3:48.0	3:48.21	Q
5	Ingvar Ericsson	Sweden	3:49:0	3:49.20	
6	Yevgeny Sokolov	Soviet Union	3:49:2	3:49.27	
7	Evangelos Depastas	Greece	3:52:0	3:51.79	
8	Olavi Salsola	Finland	3:55:0	–	
9	Günther Dohrow	United Team of Germany	3:58:0	–	
10	Ramón Sandoval	Chile	3:58:1	–	
11	Donald Bowden	United States	3:59.7	–	
12	Emile Leva	Belgium	4:06:0	–	
13	Sank Ok-Sim	South Korea	4:09.0	–	
14	Mahmoud Jan	Pakistan	4:15:0	–	
15	Somnuek Srisombat	Thailand	4:30:0	–	

==== Heat 3 ====
Rank	Athlete	Nation	Time (hand)	Time (automatic)	Notes
1	Neville Scott	New Zealand	3:48:0	3:48.09	Q
2	Brian Hewson	Great Britain	3:48:0	3:48.10	Q
3	John Landy	Australia	3:48.6	3:48.67	Q
4	Gunnar Nielsen	Denmark	3:48.6	3:48.80	Q
5	Dan Waern	Sweden	3:48:8	3:48.84	
6	Gianfranco Baraldi	Italy	3:52:0	3:52.20	
7	Sergey Soukhanov	Soviet Union	3:53:0	3:52.96	
8	Jerome Walters	United States	3:55:7	3:55.60	
9	Georgios Papavassiliou	Greece	3:57:0	3:57.57	
10	Eduardo Fontecilla	Chile	3:58:6	3:58.45	
—	Siegfried Herrmann	United Team of Germany	DNF	–	
—	Muhammad Anwar	Pakistan	DNS	–	
—	Audun Boysen	Norway	DNS	–	
—	George Johnson	Liberia	DNS	–	
—	Veliša Mugoša	Yugoslavia	DNS	–	

==== Overall results for heats ====
Rank	Athlete	Nation	Time (hand)	Time (automatic)	Notes
1	Mervyn Lincoln	Australia	3:45.4	3:45.63	Q
2	Klaus Richtzenhain	United Team of Germany	3:46.6	3:46.76	Q
3	Stanislav Jungwirth	Czechoslovakia	3:46.6	3:46.79	Q
4	Kenneth Wood	Great Britain	3:46.6	3:46.90	Q
5	Ian Boyd	Great Britain	3:47.0	3:47.13	Q
6	Murray Halberg	New Zealand	3:47.2	3:47.39	Q
7	Ron Delany	Ireland	3:47.4	3:47.48	Q
8	Neville Scott	New Zealand	3:48.0	3:48.09	Q
9	Brian Hewson	Great Britain	3:48.0	3:48.10	Q
10	Laszlo Tabori	Hungary	3:48.0	3:48.21	Q
11	John Landy	Australia	3:48.6	3:48.67	Q
12	Gunnar Nielsen	Denmark	3:48.6	3:48.80	Q
13	Dan Waern	Sweden	3:48.8	3:48.84	
14	Ingvar Ericsson	Sweden	3:49.0	3:49.20	
15	Yevgeny Sokolov	Soviet Union	3:49.2	3:49.27	
16	István Rozsavolgyi	Hungary	3:49.4	3:49.54	
17	André Ballieux	Belgium	3:49.8	3:49.94	
18	Michel Jazy	France	3:50.0	3:49.95	
19	Ted Wheeler	United States	3:50.1	3:50.02	
20	Josy Barthel	Luxembourg	3:50.6	3:50.64	
21	Jonas Pipynė	Soviet Union	3:50.6	3:50.86	
22	Mamo Wolde	Ethiopia	3:51.0	–	
23	Evangelos Depastas	Greece	3:52.0	3:51.79	
24	Gianfranco Baraldi	Italy	3:52.0	3:52.20	
25	Sergey Soukhanov	Soviet Union	3:53.0	3:52.96	
26	Olavi Salsola	Finland	3:55.0	–	
27	Jerome Walters	United States	3:55.7	3:55.60	
28	Georgios Papavassiliou	Greece	3:57.0	3:57.57	
29	Günther Dohrow	United Team of Germany	3:58.0	–	
30	Ramón Sandoval	Chile	3:58.1	–	
31	Eduardo Fontecilla	Chile	3:58.6	3:58.45	
32	Donald Bowden	United States	3:59.7	–	
33	Emile Leva	Belgium	4:06.0	–	
34	Sank Ok-Sim	South Korea	4:09.0	–	
35	Mahmoud Jan	Pakistan	4:15.0	–	
36	Somnuek Srisombat	Thailand	4:30.0	–	
—	Siegfried Herrmann	United Team of Germany	DNF	–	
—	Muhammad Anwar	Pakistan	DNS	–	
—	Jim Bailey	Australia	DNS	–	
—	Audun Boysen	Norway	DNS	–	
—	Phol Jaiswang	Thailand	DNS	–	
—	George Johnson	Liberia	DNS	–	
—	Dimitrios Konstantinidis	Greece	DNS	–	
—	Veliša Mugoša	Yugoslavia	DNS	–	
—	Joseph Narmath	Liberia	DNS	–	

=== Final ===
Rank	Athlete	Nation	Time (hand)	Time (automatic)	Notes
1st place, gold medalist(s)	Ron Delany	Ireland	3:41.2	3:41.49	OR
2nd place, silver medalist(s)	Klaus Richtzenhain	United Team of Germany	3:42.0	3:42.02	
3rd place, bronze medalist(s)	John Landy	Australia	3:42.0	3:42.03	
4	Laszlo Tabori	Hungary	3:42.4	3:42.55	
5	Brian Hewson	Great Britain	3:42.6	3:42.69	
6	Stanislav Jungwirth	Czechoslovakia	3:42.6	3:42.80	
7	Neville Scott	New Zealand	3:42.8	3:42.87	
8	Ian Boyd	Great Britain	3:43.0	3:42.94	
9	Kenneth Wood	Great Britain	3:44.3	3:44.76	
10	Gunnar Nielsen	Denmark	3:45.0	3:45.58	
11	Murray Halberg	New Zealand	3:45.2	3:46.09	
12	Mervyn Lincoln	Australia	3:51.9	–	
