= 1954 European Athletics Championships – Men's 1500 metres =

Men's 1500 metres at the European Athletics Championships

The men's 1500 metres at the 1954 European Athletics Championships was held in Bern, Switzerland, at Stadion Neufeld on 26 and 29 August 1954.

== Medalists ==
Gold	Roger Bannister; Great Britain
Silver	Gunnar Nielsen; Denmark
Bronze	Stanislav Jungwirth; Czechoslovakia

== Results ==
=== Final ===
29 August

Rank	Name	Nationality	Time	Notes
1st place, gold medalist(s)	Roger Bannister	Great Britain	3:43.8	CR NR
2nd place, silver medalist(s)	Gunnar Nielsen	Denmark	3:44.4	NR
3rd place, bronze medalist(s)	Stanislav Jungwirth	Czechoslovakia	3:45.4	
4	Ingvar Ericsson	Sweden	3:46.2	
5	Werner Lueg	West Germany	3:46.4	
6	Sándor Iharos	Hungary	3:47.0	
7	Denis Johansson	Finland	3:47.4	
8	Günter Dohrow	West Germany	3:48.2	
9	Ian Boyd	Great Britain	3:49.2	
10	Jorma Kakko	Finland	3:51.8	
	Veliša Mugoša	Yugoslavia	DNF	
	Alfred Langenus	Belgium	DNS	

=== Heats ===
26 August

==== Heat 1 ====
Rank	Name	Nationality	Time	Notes
1	Günter Dohrow	West Germany	3:51.0	Q
2	Stanislav Jungwirth	Czechoslovakia	3:51.2	Q
3	Roger Bannister	Great Britain	3:51.8	Q
4	Alfred Langenus	Belgium	3:51.8	Q
5	Andrej Vipotnik	Yugoslavia	3:52.2	
6	Edmund Potrzebowski	Poland	3:52.2	
7	Vladimir Bagreyev	Soviet Union	3:53.0	
8	August Sutter	Switzerland	3:54.4	
9	Ekrem Koçak	Turkey	3:57.4	
10	Richard Badet	France	3:57.8	

==== Heat 2 ====
Rank	Name	Nationality	Time	Notes
1	Veliša Mugoša	Yugoslavia	3:51.0	Q
2	Sándor Iharos	Hungary	3:51.2	Q
3	Ingvar Ericsson	Sweden	3:51.4	Q
4	Jorma Kakko	Finland	3:51.4	Q
5	Roger Müller	Luxembourg	3:52.0	
6	Gaston Reiff	Belgium	3:57.0	
7	Evangelos Depastas	Greece	3:58.2	
8	Heinz Thoet	Switzerland	4:01.0	
9	Manuel Macías	Spain	4:10.6	

==== Heat 3 ====
Rank	Name	Nationality	Time	Notes
1	Werner Lueg	West Germany	3:53.2	Q
2	Ian Boyd	Great Britain	3:53.2	Q
3	Gunnar Nielsen	Denmark	3:53.6	Q
4	Denis Johansson	Finland	3:53.8	Q
5	Antoine Vincendon	France	3:54.6	
6	István Rózsavölgyi	Hungary	3:54.6	
7	Alexander Zvolensky	Czechoslovakia	3:55.2	
8	Kazimierz Żbikowski	Poland	3:56.6	
9	Dimitrios Konstantinidis	Greece	3:57.6	
10	Turhan Göker	Turkey	4:01.2	

== Participation ==
According to an unofficial count, 29 athletes from 17 countries participated in the event.

- Belgium (2)
- Czechoslovakia (2)
- Denmark (1)
- Finland (2)
- France (2)
- Greece (2)
- Hungary (2)
- Luxembourg (1)
- Poland (2)
- Soviet Union (1)
- Spain (1)
- Sweden (1)
- Switzerland (2)
- Turkey (2)
- Great Britain (2)
- West Germany (2)
- Yugoslavia (2)
