= Athletics at the 1956 Summer Olympics – Men's 800 metres =

Men's 800 metres at the Games of the XVI Olympiad
- Venue: Melbourne Cricket Ground
- Dates: November 23, 1956 (heats); November 24, 1956 (semifinals); November 26, 1956 (final)
- Competitors: 38 from 24 nations
- Winning time: 1:47.7 OR

Medalists
1st place, gold medalist(s)		Tom Courtney; United States
2nd place, silver medalist(s)		Derek Johnson; Great Britain
3rd place, bronze medalist(s)		Audun Boysen; Norway

Video on YouTube Official Video

The men's 800 metres event at the 1956 Summer Olympics in Melbourne was held on 23, 24, and 26 November 1956. There were a total number of 38 competitors from 24 nations. The maximum number of athletes per nation had been set at 3 since the 1930 Olympic Congress. The event was won by Tom Courtney, the last of a streak of four American victories in the event and the seventh overall United States victory. Derek Johnson's silver put Great Britain back on the podium for the first time since that nation's own four-Games gold streak ended in 1932. Norway received its first men's 800 metres medal with Audun Boysen's bronze.

== Summary ==
This one Olympiad saw the use of starting blocks from a waterfall start for the 800 meters. All subsequent races have used a standing start in lanes, breaking after the first turn (known as a one turn stagger). Out of the blocks, Tom Courtney got the edge around the turn, but by the end of the turn Arnie Sowell edged into the lead. Over the next 150 metres, Sowell opened up as much as a three-metre lead, but Courtney didn't go away. He bided his time for the next lap working his way back to Sowell's shoulder into the final turn and he brought Audun Boysen and Derek Johnson with him. Coming off the final turn it was the two Americans shoulder to shoulder, Sowell on the inside and Courtney on the outside looking like they would fight each other to the finish line like so many domestic races earlier in the season. Johnson had other ideas, squeezing between the two and into daylight. Again Courtney didn't go away, instead accelerating to keep pace, then with a final burst of speed, passing Johnson 20 metres before the tape to take the gold. Boysen followed Courtney past Sowell to narrowly capture bronze.

== Background ==
This was the 13th appearance of the event, which is one of 12 athletics events to have been held at every Summer Olympics. The only finalist from the 1952 Games to return was fourth-place finisher Gunnar Nielsen of Denmark. In 1955, Audun Boysen of Norway had run under the then-world record time—but in a race in which he finished second, to Roger Moens of Belgium. Moens was injured and did not compete in Melbourne. Boysen faced American favorites Arnie Sowell (AAU champion) and Tom Courtney (U.S. Olympic trials victor) and British favorites Mike Rawson (AAA champion) and Derek Johnson (Commonwealth champion).

Ethiopia, Kenya, Liberia, and Malaya appeared in the event for the first time; German athletes competed as the Unified Team of Germany for the first time. Great Britain and the United States each made their 12th appearance, tied for the most among all nations.

== Competition format ==
The event used the three-round format introduced in 1912. However, the number of semifinals was reduced from 3 to 2 and the final was shrunk from 9 men to 8. There were five first-round heats, each with between 6 and 9 athletes; the top three runners in each heat advanced to the semifinals. There were two semifinals with 7 or 8 athletes each; the top four runners in each semifinal advanced to the eight-man final.

== Records ==
These were the standing world and Olympic records (in minutes) prior to the 1948 Summer Olympics.

World record	Roger Moens (BEL)	1:45.7	Oslo, Norway	3 August 1955
Olympic record	Mal Whitfield (USA)	1:49.2	London, United Kingdom	2 August 1948

Tom Courtney set a new Olympic record with a time of 1:47.7 in the final; the top four men in the final all broke the old record and the fifth-place finisher tied it.

== Schedule ==
All times are Australian Eastern Standard Time (UTC+10)

Date	Time	Round
Friday, 23 November 1956	16:15	Round 1
Saturday, 24 November 1956	16:00	Semifinals
Monday, 26 November 1956	15:30	Final

== Results ==
=== Heats ===
Five heats were held, the fastest three of each would qualify for the semifinals.

==== Heat 1 ====
Rank	Athlete	Nation	Time (hand)	Time (automatic)	Notes
1	Audun Boysen	Norway	1:52.0	1:52.08	Q
2	Mike Rawson	Great Britain	1:52.1	1:52.20	Q
3	Yoshitaka Muroya	Japan	1:52.3	1:52.42	Q
4	Gerard Rasquin	Luxembourg	1:52.7	1:52.88	
5	Dimitrios Konstantinidis	Greece	1:52.7	1:53.03	
6	Frank Rivera	Puerto Rico	1:56.4	1:56.58	
7	Mamo Wolde	Ethiopia	1:58.0	–	
—	Murray Cockburn	Canada	DNS	–	
—	Olavi Salsola	Finland	DNS	–	
—	Dan Waern	Sweden	DNS	–	

==== Heat 2 ====
Rank	Athlete	Nation	Time (hand)	Time (automatic)	Notes
1	Tom Courtney	United States	1:52.7	1:52.83	Q
2	Mike Farrell	Great Britain	1:52.8	1:52.86	Q
3	Evangelos Depastas	Greece	1:53.1	1:53.23	Q
4	Don MacMillan	Australia	1:53.4	1:53.50	
5	Shigeharu Suzuki	Japan	1:54.1	1:54.29	
6	Paul Schmidt	United Team of Germany	1:55.6	1:55.71	
7	Manikavagasam Harichandra	Malaya	–	1:56.27	
8	Doug Clement	Canada	–	1:56.92	
9	Phoi Jaiswang	Thailand	Unknown		
—	István Rózsavölgyi	Hungary	DNS	–	

==== Heat 3 ====
Rank	Athlete	Nation	Time (hand)	Time (automatic)	Notes
1	James Bailey	Australia	1:51.1	1:51.13	Q
2	Arnie Sowell	United States	1:51.3	1:51.27	Q
3	Émile Leva	Belgium	1:52.0	1:52.03	Q
4	Sohan Singh Dhanoa	India	1:52.4	1:52.57	
5	Eduardo Fontecilla	Chile	1:52.8	1:52.94	
6	Günter Dohrow	United Team of Germany	1:53.7	1:53.90	
7	Arap Kiptalam Keter	Kenya	–	1:56.13	
8	Bayene Ayanew	Ethiopia	Unknown	–	
9	Kenneth Perera	Malaya	Unknown	–	

==== Heat 4 ====
Rank	Athlete	Nation	Time (hand)	Time (automatic)	Notes
1	Gunnar Nielsen	Denmark	1:51.2	1:51.27	Q
2	Lonnie Spurrier	United States	1:51.5	1:51.52	Q
3	Bill Butchart	Australia	1:51.6	1:51.67	Q
4	Gianfranco Baraldi	Italy	1:51.9	1:51.90	
5	Abdullah Khan	Pakistan	1:52.6	1:52.71	
6	Sim Sang-ok	South Korea	1:55.5	1:55.56	
7	George Johnson	Liberia	Unknown	–	
—	Ronnie Delany	Ireland	DNS	–	
—	Stanislav Jungwirth	Czechoslovakia	DNS	–	

==== Heat 5 ====
Rank	Athlete	Nation	Time (hand)	Time (automatic)	Notes
1	Derek Johnson	Great Britain	1:50.8	1:50.93	Q
2	René Djian	France	1:51.1	1:51.15	Q
3	Lajos Szentgali	Hungary	1:51.8	1:51.89	Q
4	Ramón Sandoval	Chile	1:51.9	1:52.12	
5	Klaus Richtzenhain	United Team of Germany	1:53.3	1:53.47	
6	Mahmoud Jan	Pakistan	1:59.5	–	
—	Josy Barthel	Luxembourg	DNS	–	
—	George Kerr	Jamaica	DNS	–	
—	Joseph Narmath	Liberia	DNS	–	

=== Semifinals ===
Two semifinals were held, the fastest four of each would qualify for the final.

==== Semifinal 1 ====
Nielsen withdrew, "reserving himself for the 1,500 metres."

Rank	Athlete	Nation	Time (hand)	Time (automatic)	Notes
1	Thomas Courtney	United States	1:53.6	1:53.62	Q
2	Lonnie Spurrier	United States	1:53.6	1:53.71	Q
3	Mike Farrell	Great Britain	1:53.7	1:53.78	Q
4	Bill Butchart	Australia	1:53.8	1:53.81	Q
5	Lajos Szentgali	Hungary	1:53.9	1:53.94	
6	Yoshitaka Muroya	Japan	1:54.5	1:54.68	
—	Gunnar Nielsen	Denmark	DNS	–	

==== Semifinal 2 ====
Bailey was "obviously unwell and later scratched from the 1,500 metres."

Rank	Athlete	Nation	Time (hand)	Time (automatic)	Notes
1	Arnie Sowell	United States	1:50.0	1:50.08	Q
2	Audun Boysen	Norway	1:50.0	1:50.20	Q
3	Derek Johnson	Great Britain	1:50.2	1:50.23	Q
4	Emile Leva	Belgium	1:50.4	1:50.44	Q
5	Mike Rawson	Great Britain	1:50.4	1:50.45	
6	René Djian	France	1:50.7	1:50.47	
7	James Bailey	Australia	1:51.4	1:51.40	
8	Evangelos Depastas	Greece	1:52.0	1:52.19	

=== Final ===
Rank	Athlete	Nation	Time (hand)	Time (automatic)	Notes
1st place, gold medalist(s)	Tom Courtney	United States	1:47.7	1:47.75	OR
2nd place, silver medalist(s)	Derek Johnson	Great Britain	1:47.8	1:47.88	
3rd place, bronze medalist(s)	Audun Boysen	Norway	1:48.1	1:48.25	
4	Arnie Sowell	United States	1:48.3	1:48.41	
5	Mike Farrell	Great Britain	1:49.2	1:49.29	
6	Lonnie Spurrier	United States	1:49.3	1:49.38	
7	Emile Leva	Belgium	1:51.8	1:51.75	
8	Bill Butchart	Australia	1:52.0	–	
