= Athletics at the 1951 Pan American Games – Men's 3000 metres steeplechase =

Men's 3,000 metres steeplechase at the Pan American Games

The men's 3000 metres steeplechase event at the 1951 Pan American Games was held at the Estadio Monumental in Buenos Aires on 4 March.

== Results ==
Rank	Name	Nationality	Time	Notes
1st place, gold medalist(s)	Curt Stone	United States	9:32.0	
2nd place, silver medalist(s)	Browning Ross	United States	9:32.0	
3rd place, bronze medalist(s)	Pedro Caffa	Argentina	9:44.6	
4	Esteban Fekete	Argentina	9:51.3	
5	Guillermo Solá	Chile	10:10.3	
6	Efraín Recinos	Guatemala	10:38.8	
7	Guillermo Rojas	Guatemala	?:??.?	
8	Jorge González	Chile	?:??.?	
	Libardo Mora	Colombia	DNS	
	John Twomey	United States	DNS	
	Ricardo Bralo	Argentina	DNS	
