= Athletics at the 1951 Pan American Games – Men's 1500 metres =

Men's 1500 metres at the Pan American Games

The men's 1500 metres event at the 1951 Pan American Games was held at the Estadio Monumental in Buenos Aires on 3 and 5 March.

== Medalists ==
Gold	Silver	Bronze
Browning Ross; United States	Guillermo Solá; Chile	John Twomey; United States

== Results ==
=== Heats ===
Rank	Heat	Name	Nationality	Time	Notes
1	1	Curt Stone	United States	4:08.9	Q
2	1	Guillermo Solá	Chile	4:08.9	Q
3	1	Hugo Ponce	Argentina	4:10.1	Q
4	1	Libardo Mora	Colombia	4:10.8	Q
5	1	Frank Prince	Panama	4:11.9	Q
6	1	Luis Secco	Argentina	?:??.?	
	1	Luis Modeste	Trinidad and Tobago	?:??.?	
	1	Guillermo Rojas	Guatemala	?:??.?	
	1	Argemiro Roque	Brazil	DNS	
	1	Anastasio Zelaya	Paraguay	DNS	
1	2	Browning Ross	United States	4:13.8	Q
2	2	John Twomey	United States	4:13.8	Q
3	2	Luís Rodrigues	Brazil	4:14.4	Q
4	2	Oscar Gauharou	Argentina	4:14.9	Q
5	2	Wilfred Tull	Trinidad and Tobago	4:15.2	Q
6	2	Haroldo Gallardo	Chile	?:??.?	
	2	Rubén Figueredo	Paraguay	?:??.?	
	2	Rogelio Gómez	Peru	?:??.?	
	2	Efraín Recinos	Guatemala	DNS	

=== Final ===
Rank	Name	Nationality	Time	Notes
1st place, gold medalist(s)	Browning Ross	United States	4:00.4	
2nd place, silver medalist(s)	Guillermo Solá	Chile	4:00.5	
3rd place, bronze medalist(s)	John Twomey	United States	4:02.0	
4	Curt Stone	United States	4:03.7	
5	Oscar Gauharou	Argentina	4:04.2	
6	Luís Rodrigues	Brazil	4:05.5	
	Hugo Ponce	Argentina	?:??.?	
	Libardo Mora	Colombia	?:??.?	
	Frank Prince	Panama	?:??.?	
	Wilfred Tull	Trinidad and Tobago	?:??.?	
