= Stanislav Jungwirth =

Czechoslovak runner (1930–1986)

Personal information
- Nationality: Czechoslovakia
- Born: 15 August 1930 Prachatice, Czechoslovakia
- Died: 11 April 1986 (aged 55) Prague, Czechoslovakia
Medal record
Men's athletics
Representing Czechoslovakia
European Championships
Bronze medal – third place	1954 Bern	1500 m

Stanislav Jungwirth (15 August 1930 – 11 April 1986) was a Czechoslovak middle-distance runner. Jungwirth came third in the 1500 metres at the 1954 European Championships and set a world record for the same distance in 1957.

== Career ==
Jungwirth started training seriously in 1949. By 1951, he was already a quality runner, running the 1500 metres in 3:48.8; Track and Field News ranked him No. 8 in the world that year. In 1952, he won the Czechoslovak championship at both 800 and 1500 metres and was selected to run the latter distance at the Olympics in Helsinki, where he survived the heats but went out in the semi-finals. Late in October 1952, he set a new world record at 1000 metres in Stará Boleslav, running 2:21.2 to better Olle Åberg's time by 0.1 seconds. This record was broken less than ten months later by the United States' Mal Whitfield.

Jungwirth continued improving and won his only international medal at the 1954 European Championships in Bern, where he was third behind Roger Bannister and Gunnar Nielsen with a time of 3:45.4. At the 1956 Olympics in Melbourne he finished 6th in 3:42.6.

On 12 July 1957 - again in Stará Boleslav - Jungwirth ran 1500 metres in 3:38.1, breaking the world record of 3:40.2 set just the previous day by Finland's Olavi Salsola and Olavi Salonen. A week later in London, he was the first Czechoslovak to run a four-minute mile; however, his time of 3:59.1 was only good enough for third place while the winner, Derek Ibbotson, ran a new world record 3:57.2.

Jungwirth suffered from health problems in 1958 and was 8th at the European Championships, even though his time of 3:44.4 was a second faster than his bronze medal performance in 1954. He lost his world record on 28 August 1958, when Australia's Herb Elliott ran 3:36.0 in Gothenburg; Jungwirth himself was second in that race in 3:39.0. Jungwirth's health problems continued in 1959 and 1960 and he was unable to take part in the 1960 Summer Olympics in Rome. He retired from athletics as a result.

Track and Field News ranked Jungwirth in the world's top 10 at 1500 metres seven times between 1951 and 1959, with a highest ranking of No. 3 in 1957. Jungwirth also made the top 10 at 800 metres in 1952 and 1953.

Records
Preceded by (Sweden) Olle Åberg	Men's 1000 metres world record holder 27 October 1952 – 16 August 1953	Succeeded by (United States) Mal Whitfield
Preceded by (Finland) Olavi Salsola (Finland) Olavi Salonen	Men's 1500 metres world record holder 12 July 1957 – 28 August 1958	Succeeded by (Australia) Herb Elliott
