= Olavi =

Male given name

Olavi is a Finnish masculine given name from Olav/Olaf name. Notable people with the name include:

- Olavi Ahonen (1923–2000), Finnish film actor
- Olavi Alakulppi (1915–1990), Finnish cross country skier who competed in the 1930s
- Olavi Hänninen (1920–1992), Finnish designer
- Joose Olavi Hannula (1900–1944), Finnish colonel and historian
- Olavi Köppä (1951–2025), Finnish speed skater
- Olavi Kuronen (1923–1989), Finnish ski jumper who competed in the 1950s
- Olavi Laiho (1907–1944), the last Finn to be executed in Finland
- Olavi Larkas (1913–1984), Finnish Olympic fencer and modern pentathlete
- Olavi Litmanen (born 1945), Finnish former international footballer
- Olavi Mäenpää (1950–2018), Finnish politician and chairman of Suomen Kansan Sinivalkoiset, a far right political party
- Olavi Ojanperä (1921–2016), Finnish sprint canoeist who competed in the early 1950s
- Olavi Paavolainen (1903–1964), Finnish essayist, journalist, travel book writer, poet, and cosmopolitan
- Olavi Rove (1915–1966), Finnish gymnast and Olympic Champion
- Olavi Sihvonen, a Finnish Nordic combined skier who competed in the 1940s
- Martti Olavi Siirala (1922–2008), Finnish psychiatrist, psychoanalyst and philosopher
- Olavi Suomalainen (born 1947), Finnish former marathon runner
- Olavi Svanberg, Finnish ski-orienteering competitor and world champion
- Olavi Tuomi (1932–2006), Finnish cinematographer
- Olavi Uusivirta (born 1983), Finnish rock/pop singer, songwriter and actor
- Olavi Virta (originally to 1926 Oskari Olavi Ilmen) (1915–1972), Finnish singer, acclaimed as the king of Finnish tango
- Vaino Olavi Partanen, member of the Canadian Forces and a recipient of the Cross of Valour
- Olavi Salonen (1933–2025), Finnish former 1500 metres world record holder
- Olavi Salsola (1933–1995), Finnish former 1500 metres world record holder
- Olavi Vuorisalo (1933–2024), Finnish former 1500 metres world record holder

== See also ==
- 2573 Hannu Olavi, a main-belt asteroid
