= Olle Åberg =

Swedish middle-distance runner

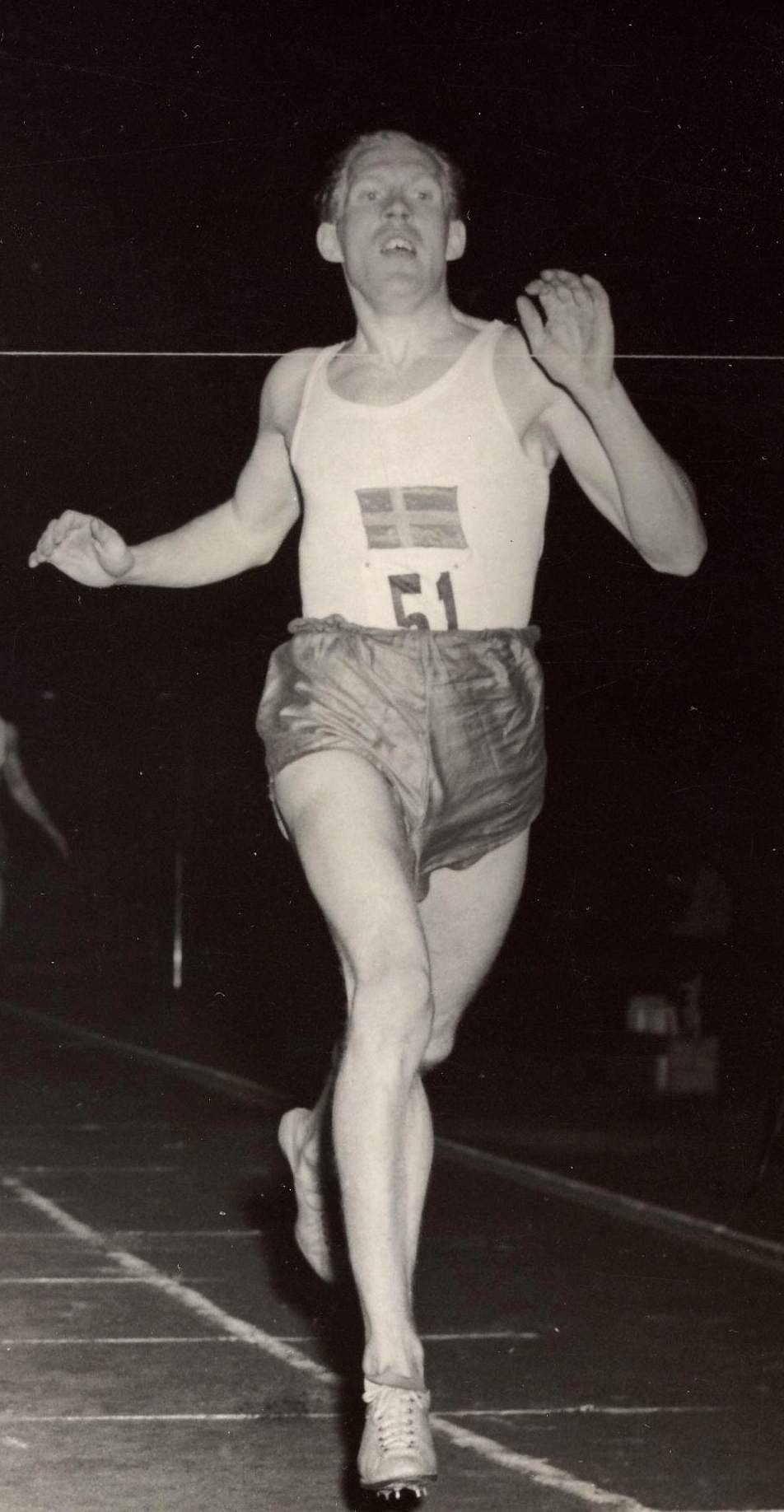
- Olle Åberg in 1949

Personal information
- Born: 24 January 1925 Hofors, Sweden
- Died: 20 December 2013 (aged 88) Gävle, Sweden
- Height: 1.81 m (5 ft 11 in)
- Weight: 78 kg (172 lb)

Sport
- Sport: Athletics
- Events: 800 m, 1500 m
- Club: Gefle IF; Hofors AIF

Achievements and titles
- Personal bests: 800 m – 1:49.3 (1953); 1500 m – 3:45.4 (1951)

Olof Viktor "Olle" Åberg (24 January 1925 – 20 December 2013) was a Swedish middle-distance runner. He competed in the 1500 metres at the 1952 Olympics and finished seventh.

Åberg was born in Hofors, and in addition to the local club Hofors AIF he represented Gefle IF. With Gefle IF he participated in setting a world record in the 4×1500 metres relay at 15:34.6 minutes in 1947. The team improved the record in 1949. Åberg won the national 1500 m title in 1951. Next year, on 10 August 1952, he set a world record in the 1000 metres at 2:21.4.

Records
Preceded by Rune Gustafsson; Marcel Hansenne (joint)	Men's 1000 metres World Record Holder; 10 August 1952 – 27 October 1952	Succeeded by Stanislav Jungwirth
