= Ballieux =

Ballieux is a surname. Notable people with the surname include:

- André Ballieux (born 1933), Belgian middle-distance runner
- Rudy Ballieux (1930–2020), Dutch immunologis
