= Juan Miranda (runner) =

Argentine middle-distance runner (born 1928)

Medal record

Men's athletics

Representing Argentina

Pan American Games
Gold medal – first place	1955 Mexico City	1500 m

South America Championships
Bronze medal – third place	1952 Buenos Aires	5000 m

Juan Doroteo Miranda (born 1928) was an Argentine middle-distance runner who specialised in the 1500 metres. He was the gold medallist in that event at the 1955 Pan American Games and twice broke the South American record.

Born in San Basilio in Río Cuarto Department, he rose on to the regional scene in the early 1950s. He was a 5000 metres bronze medallist at the 1952 South American Championships in Athletics, taking the minor medals in Buenos Aires alongside compatriot Reinaldo Gorno (an Olympic medallist that year). A 1500 m silver medal followed at the 1953 South American Championships in Athletics, where he ran close to four minutes and finished behind Chile's Guillermo Solá.

Miranda established himself among the best runners on the continent with a South American record time of 3:53.8 minutes for the 1500 m, set on 21 January 1955, also knocking almost two seconds off the Argentine record set the previous year by his countryman Osvaldo Suárez.

Miranda was entered for both the 800 metres and the 1500 m at the 1955 Pan American Games held in Mexico City. He reached the 800 m final and ended the race in fifth place, behind a trio of Americans and Chile's Ramón Sandoval. In the 1500 m final he faced Wes Santee, one of the world's top mile runners during that period. Upsetting the form book, Miranda claimed the gold medal with an improved South American and games record of 3:53.30 minutes, edging Santee near the finish line. Miranda helped form an Argentine sweep of the distance track events at the games that year, with Osvaldo Suárez claiming a 5000 m/10,000 m double as well.

After retiring from running, he took up coaching with the Club de Asociación Atlética Banda Norte group based in Río Cuarto, Córdoba. After his death, a street in the city was named in his honour.

== International competitions ==
Year	Competition	Venue	Position	Event	Notes
Representing Argentina
1952	South American Championships	Buenos Aires, Argentina	3rd	5000 m	15:09.0
1953	South American Championships (unofficial)	Santiago, Chile	2nd	1500 m	4:00.4
1955	Pan American Games	Mexico City, Mexico	5th	800 m	1:53.31
1955	Pan American Games	Mexico City, Mexico	1st	1500 m	3:53.30 GR
1956	South American Championships	Santiago, Chile	–	1500 m	DNF
