= Jim Bailey (runner) =

Australian middle-distance runner (1929–2020)

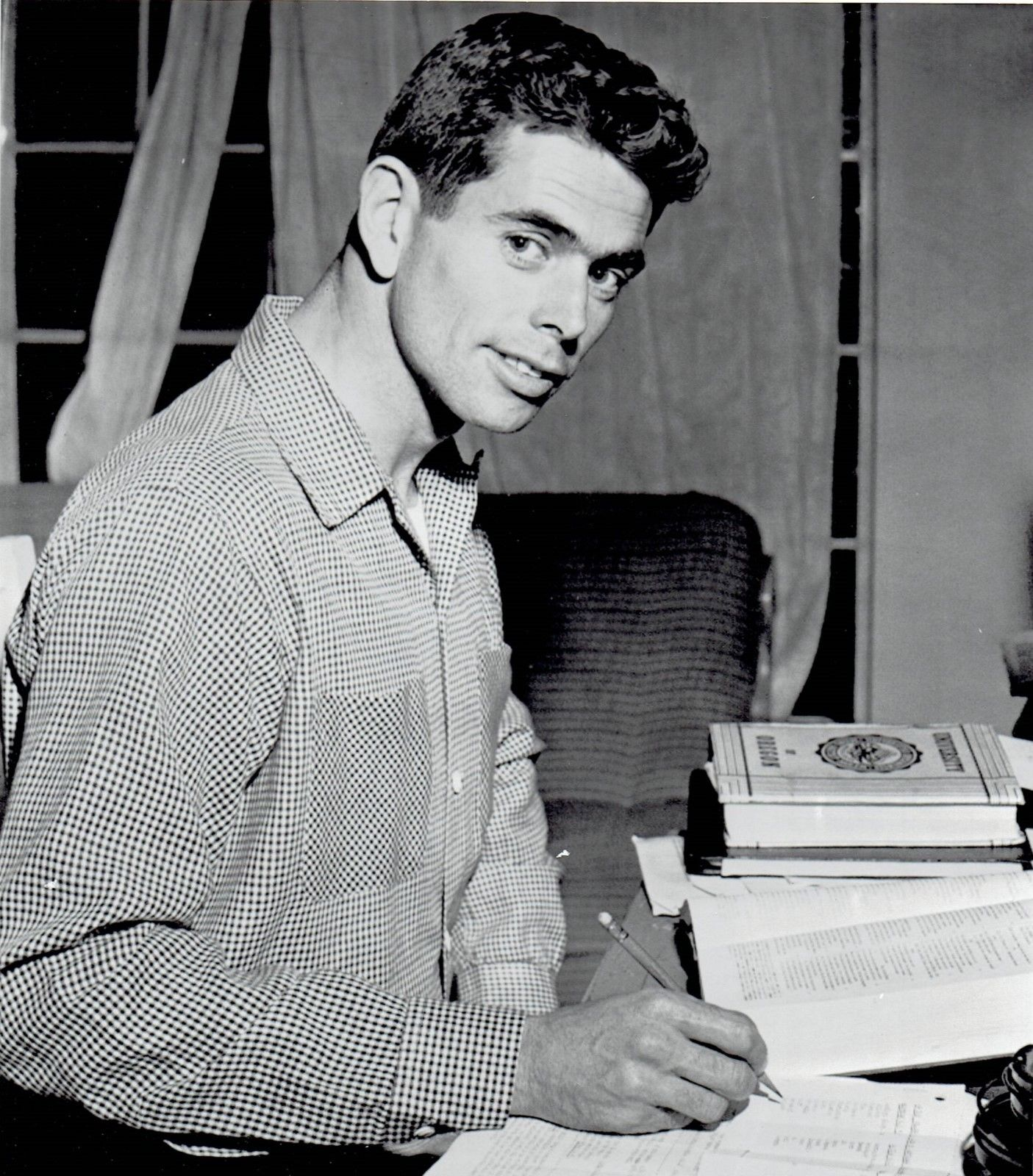
- Bailey at University of Oregon in 1956

Personal information
- Nationality: Australian
- Born: 21 July 1929 Sydney, New South Wales, Australia
- Died: 31 March 2020 (aged 90) Bellingham, Washington, U.S.
- Height: 178 cm (5 ft 10 in)
- Weight: 69 kg (152 lb)

Sport
- Sport: Middle-distance running
- Event(s): 800 m, 1500 m, mile
- Club: Oregon Ducks, Eugene
- Coached by: Bill Bowerman

Achievements and titles
- Personal best(s): 800 m – 1:48.8 (1956); 1500 m – 3:43.3 (1956); Mile – 3:58.6 (1956)

James John Bailey (21 July 1929 – 31 March 2020) was an Australian middle-distance runner. He reached semifinals of the 800 metres event at the 1956 Summer Olympics. While running for the University of Oregon under Bill Bowerman, he was the 1955 NCAA Champion in the mile. He would become the first of a string of sub-4 minute milers under Bowerman.

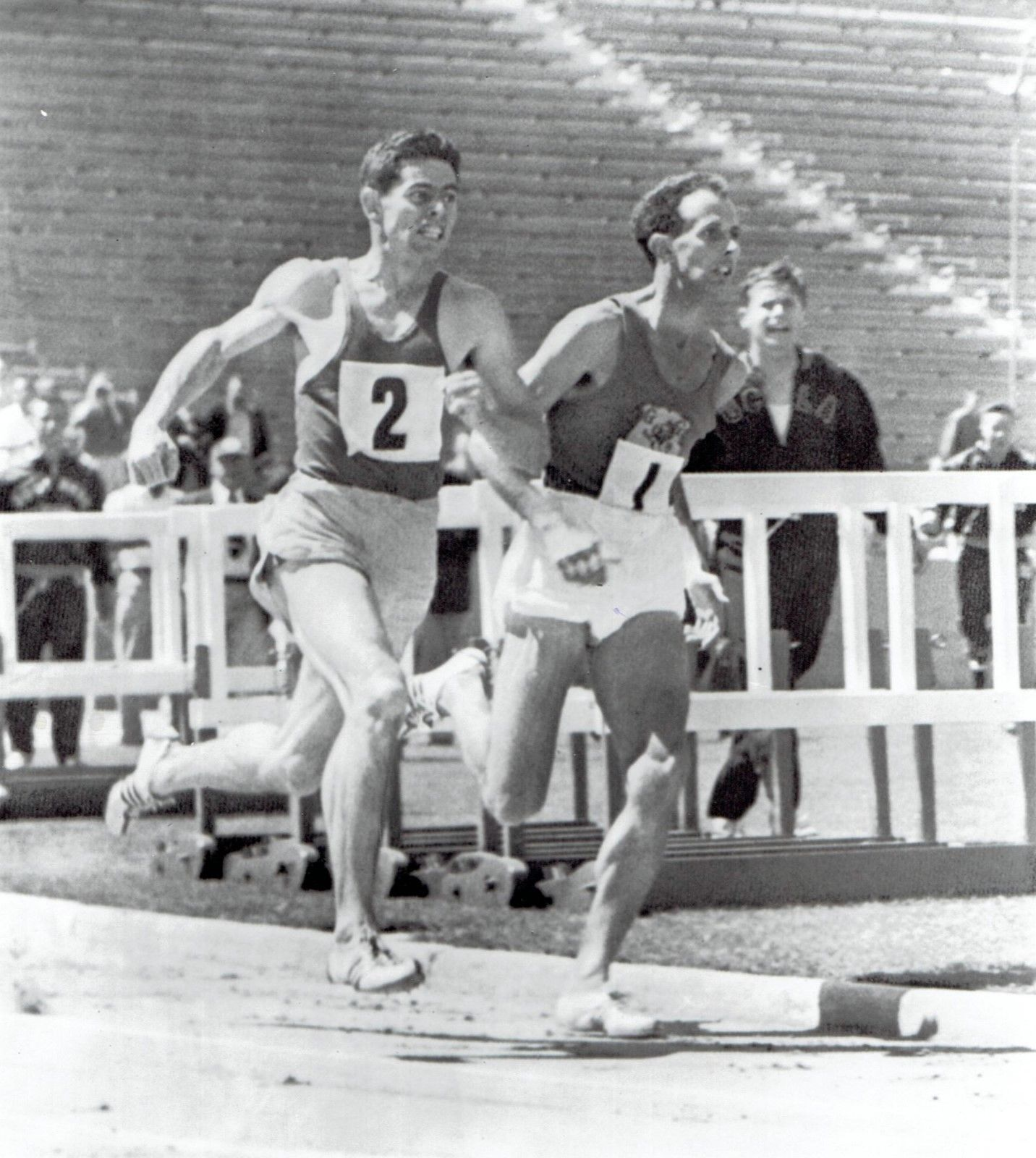
Bailey (left) overtakes Landy on the last turn of their 1956-mile race

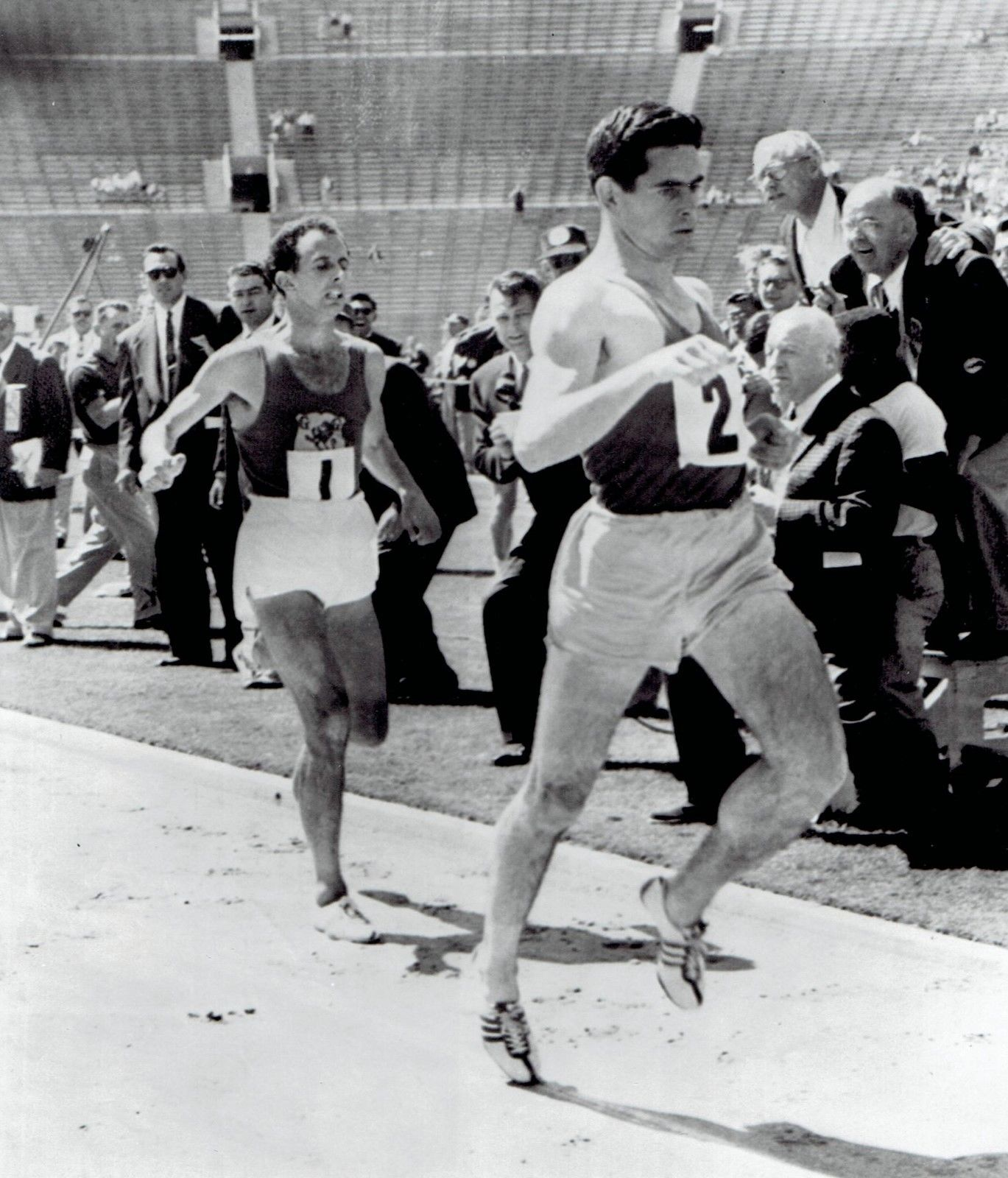
Landy and Bailey at the finish of their 1956-mile race

== Biography ==
Bailey was born in Sydney and grew up in the central-west NSW town of Parkes, New South Wales where his father was a health and buildings inspector with Parkes Municipal Council. After a decade in the country, the family moved to Hurstville, New South Wales which allowed Bailey to pursue his running by joining the local St George Athletics Club.

On 5 May 1956, Bailey was part of a mile race at the Los Angeles Memorial Coliseum. The race was a promotional effort to drum up interest in the 1956 Olympics to be held in Australia. His compatriot John Landy was going to make an attempt to become the first person to break the 4 minute mile on American soil. As the NCAA Champion, he joined other top level participants including Bill Dellinger, Jerome Walters, Lon Spurrier and Ron Delany. The lesser known Delany, who would win the Olympic 1500 later that year ran a fast first lap, separating from the field. Landy caught up with Delany a straightaway (100 yards) short of the halfway point in the race, with much of the field still in contact. As Delany continued to lead the pack, Landy broke away off the front, putting more than 10 yards on the field on the backstretch. As others fell off the pace, Bailey moved up with Delany with a lap to go. By this point Landy had a 15-yard lead. Landy accelerated for his final lap, occasionally looking back to see the size of his lead. Bailey too accelerated for his last lap. Down the final backstretch, he was sprinting much faster than Landy, catching him with about 200 yards to go. Landy did not give up, keeping Bailey to his outside the entire turn. Bailey held the advantage coming off the turn and maintained it to the finish, winning by two steps. Landy succeeded in breaking the 4 minute mile, but the first to do it on American soil was Bailey, a tick of a second earlier, running 3:58.6, a 6-second personal record.

Bailey was ranked #3 miler in the world in 1956. After retiring from competitions he played professional rugby in Australia. He then returned to the United States and lived in the Pacific Northwest for the rest of his life, working as a sportswear promoter in Kirkland, Washington, and then a real estate agent in Bellingham, Washington.

He died on 31 March 2020 in Bellingham, Washington.
