= István Rózsavölgyi =

Hungarian middle-distance runner

Olympic medal record

Men's athletics

Representing Hungary
Bronze medal – third place	1960 Rome	1500 metres

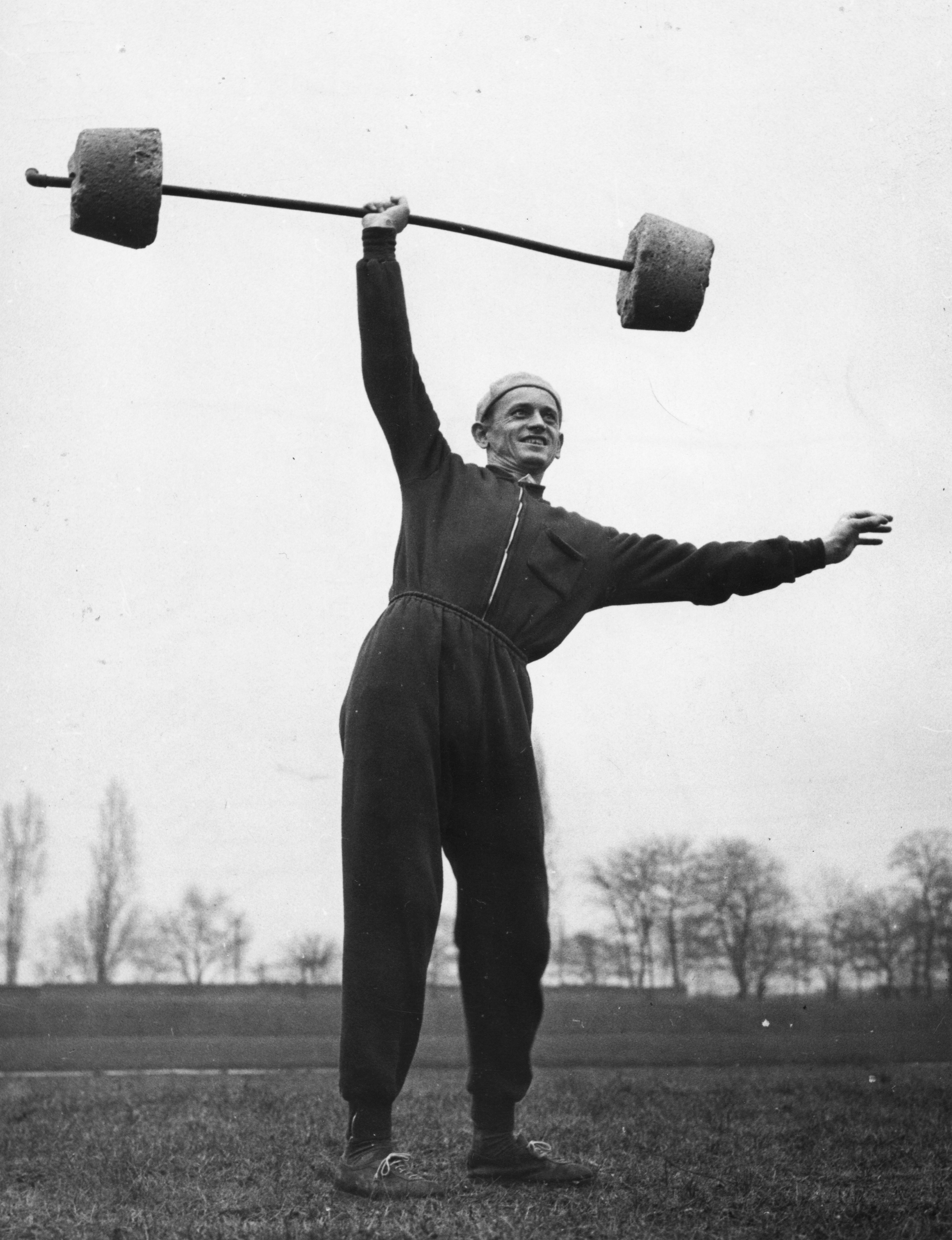
István Rózsavölgyi

István Rózsavölgyi (30 March 1929 – 27 January 2012) was a Hungarian athlete who competed mainly in the 1500 metres.

== Career ==
Rózsavölgyi was born in Budapest. One of the star pupils of Mihály Iglói, he entered the 1956 Summer Olympics held in Melbourne, Australia as the world record holder over 1000 metres, 1500 metres and 2000 metres and was expected to be a leading contender for the 1500 metres Olympic gold. However, outside circumstances shook the spirit of team Hungary. Sándor Iharos, another superstar, was absent. Back home, the Hungarian Revolution of 1956 had just been quashed by the Soviet army. Rózsavölgyi failed to even make the final.

The post-Olympic decision of Iglói and fellow 1500 m runner László Tábori not to return to Hungary was further bad news for Rózsavölgyi, who instead of training with a good friend and under a phenomenally successful coach and mentor had to continue his career essentially alone. However, he coped with this situation much better than Iharos, and stayed in world class form for another Olympiad. At the 1960 Summer Olympics in Rome, Italy, Rózsavölgyi got a partial revenge, winning the 1500 metres bronze medal in a time faster than his 1955 world record over the distance.

== Death ==
Rózsavölgyi died on 27 January 2012, aged 82, due to heart and lung ailments.

Records
Preceded by (Norway) Audun Boysen	Men's 1000 m world record holder 21 September 1955 – 19 September 1958; With: (Norway) Audun Boysen	Succeeded by (Sweden) Dan Waern
Preceded by (Hungary) Sándor Iharos (Hungary) László Tábori (Denmark) Gunnar Nielsen	Men's 1500 m world record holder 3 August 1956 – 11 July 1957	Succeeded by (Finland) Olavi Salsola (Finland) Olavi Salonen
Preceded by (Belgium) Gaston Reiff	Men's 2000 m world record holder 2 October 1955 – 14 June 1962	Succeeded by (France) Michel Jazy
