= Tom Courtney =

American track and field athlete (1933–2023)

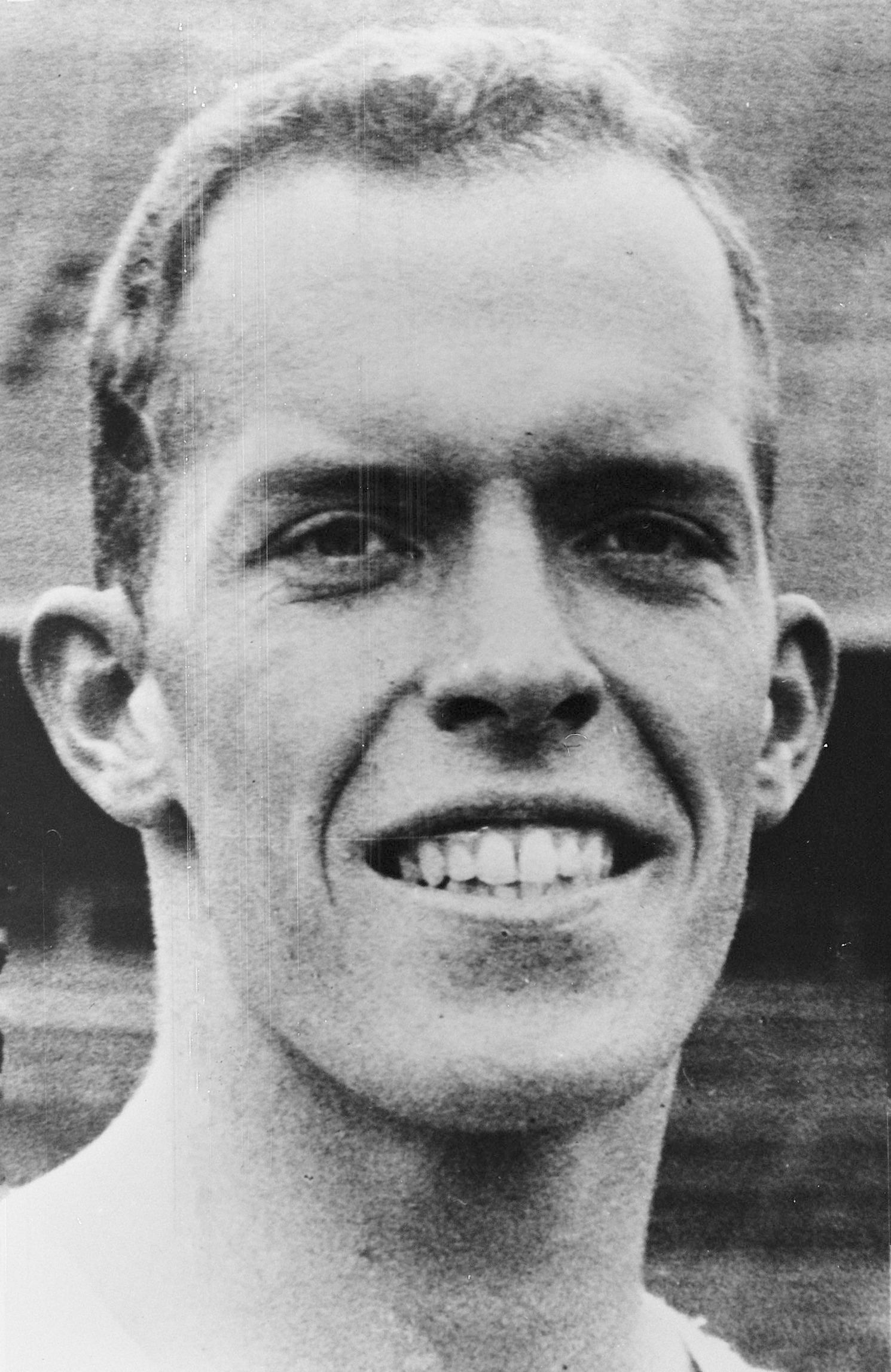
- Courtney in 1956

Personal information
- Born: August 17, 1933 South Orange, New Jersey, U.S.
- Died: August 22, 2023 (aged 90) Naples, Florida, U.S.
- Height: 1.88 m (6 ft 2 in)
- Weight: 81 kg (179 lb)

Sport
- Sport: Athletics
Medal record
Men's athletics
Representing the United States
Olympic Games
Gold medal – first place	1956 Melbourne	800 m
Gold medal – first place	1956 Melbourne	4 × 400 m relay

Thomas William Courtney (August 17, 1933 – August 22, 2023) was an American athlete and winner of two gold medals in the 1956 Olympic Games.

Born in Livingston, New Jersey, and raised in Livingston, New Jersey, Courtney's father was a former minor-league baseball player.

Courtney was a top runner at James Caldwell High School and came into national prominence while a student at Fordham University, winning the 1955 NCAA 880 yd (805 m) title.

An AAU champion in 400 m at 1956 and in 880 yd (805 m) at 1957 and 1958, Courtney had a memorable duel with Derek Johnson of Great Britain in the 1956 Olympic 800 m final. Johnson took a narrow lead with 40 meters to go, but finally Courtney won by 0.13 seconds, and collapsed with exhaustion. He later wrote:

"It was a new kind of agony for me. My head was exploding, my stomach ripping and even the tips of my fingers ached. The only thing I could think was, 'If I live, I will never run again.'"

The medal ceremony had to be delayed for an hour while he and Johnson recovered. But Courtney did run again. He was the anchorman on the gold medal 4 × 400 m relay team. He also set a world record of 1:46.8 in the 880 yd (805 m) on May 24, 1957.

Courtney received a bachelor's degree from Fordham University in 1955, and since 1994, the (autographed) varsity jacket from his college track days hangs in a display case along with similar memorabilia from other great Fordham athletes, such as Vince Lombardi.

Courtney's victory was the last in a series of four straight 800 meter gold medals by the U.S. and the seventh overall to that point in time. He could be considered the end of the dynasty. Since then, the USA has only had one other male winner, Dave Wottle in 1972 and have only won four bronze medals.

Courtney served in the U.S. Army from 1955 to 1957 before being honorably discharged. His military service overlapped with his Olympic training and competition. Courtney would later earn his MBA from Harvard Business School.

Courtney died of amyloidosis at an assisted living facility in Naples, Florida, on August 22, 2023, at the age of 90.
