= Mike Farrell (athlete) =

British middle-distance runner (born 1933)

Personal information
- Nationality: British (English)
- Born: 27 April 1933 (age 93) Sculcoates, Kingston upon Hull, England
- Height: 183 cm (6 ft 0 in)
- Weight: 73 kg (161 lb)

Sport
- Sport: Athletics
- Event: Middle-distance running
- Club: Birchfield Harriers

Michael Arthur Farrell (born 27 April 1933) is a male former British middle-distance runner who competed at the 1956 Summer Olympics.

== Biography ==
Farrell finished second behind Mike Rawson in the 880 yards event at the 1956 AAA Championships.

Later that year he represented Great Britain at the 1956 Olympic Games in Melbourne, where he participated in the men's 800 metres competition.

Farrell also represented the England athletics team in the 880 yards race at the 1958 British Empire and Commonwealth Games in Cardiff, Wales.
