= Sergey Soukhanov =

Soviet middle-distance runner

Personal information
- Nationality: Soviet
- Born: 4 December 1930
- Died: 1986 (aged 55–56)

Sport
- Sport: Middle-distance running
- Event: 1500 metres

Sergey Soukhanov (4 December 1930 – 1986) was a Soviet middle-distance runner. He competed in the men's 1500 metres at the 1956 Summer Olympics.
