= Eduardo Fontecilla =

Chilean long-distance runner (1929–2019)

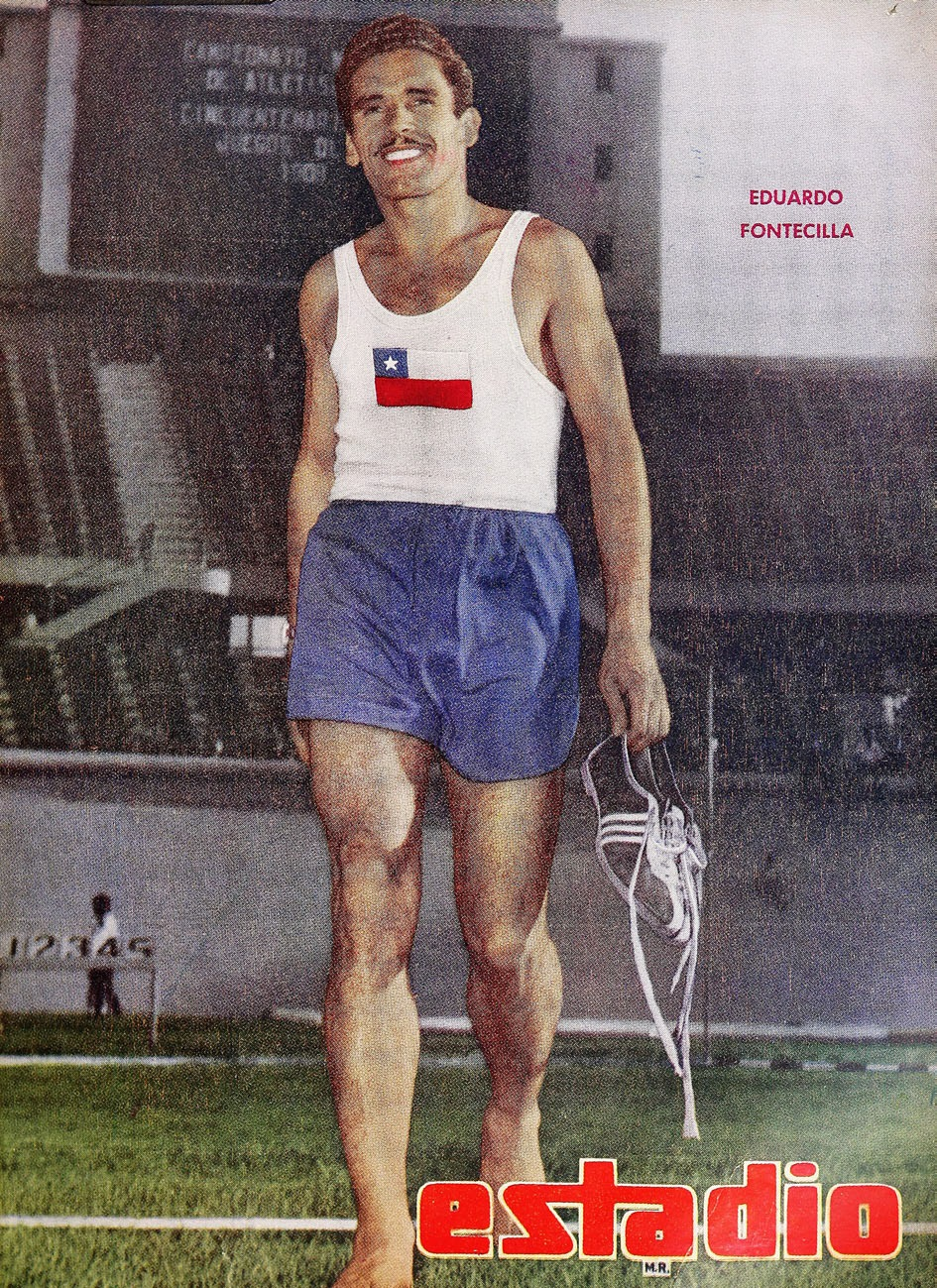

Personal information
- Born: Eduardo Roberto Gerardo Fontecilla Almanzar; 9 November 1929 San Bernardo, Chile
- Died: 7 June 2019 (aged 89)
- Height: 1.61 m (5 ft 3 in)
- Weight: 60 kg (132 lb)

Sport
- Sport: Long-distance running
- Event: Marathon

Eduardo Fontecilla (9 November 1929 – 7 June 2019) was a Chilean long-distance runner. He competed in the marathon at the 1956 Summer Olympics. Fontecilla died on 7 June 2019, at the age of 89.

== International competitions ==
Year	Competition	Venue	Position	Event	Notes
Representing Chile
1953	South American Championships (unofficial)	Santiago, Chile	5th	800 m	1:55.6
1955	Pan American Games	Mexico City, Mexico	5th (h)	1500 m	4:15.92
1956	South American Championships	Santiago, Chile	5th	800 m	1:54.0
1956	South American Championships	Santiago, Chile	5th	1500 m	3:57.6
1956	Olympic Games	Melbourne, Australia	20th (h)	800 m	1:52.94
1956	Olympic Games	Melbourne, Australia	31st (h)	1500 m	3:58.45
1956	Olympic Games	Melbourne, Australia	–	Marathon	DNF
1956	Olympic Games	Melbourne, Australia	– (h)	3000 m steeplechase	DNF
1957	South American Championships (unofficial)	Santiago, Chile	2nd	1500 m	3:52.5
1958	South American Championships	Montevideo, Uruguay	6th	800 m	1:54.6
1958	South American Championships	Montevideo, Uruguay	5th	1500 m	3:54.3

== Personal bests ==
- 800 metres – 1:52.8h (1956)
- 1500 metres – 3:50.6h (1956)
