= Athletics at the 1955 Pan American Games – Men's 800 metres =

Men's 800 metres at the Pan American Games

The men's 800 metres event at the 1955 Pan American Games was held at the Estadio Universitario in Mexico City on 14 and 16 March 1955.

== Medalists ==
Gold	Silver	Bronze
Arnie Sowell; United States	Lon Spurrier; United States	Ramón Sandoval; Chile

== Results ==
=== Heats ===
Rank	Heat	Name	Nationality	Time	Notes
1	1	Argemiro Roque	Brazil	1:55.0	Q
2	1	Lon Spurrier	United States	1:55.6	Q
3	1	Frank Rivera	Puerto Rico	1:59.0	Q
4	1	Gilberto Miora	Argentina	?:??.??	
5	1	Alberto González	Mexico	?:??.??	
6	1	Gilbert McGregor	Jamaica	?:??.??	
1	2	Ramón Sandoval	Chile	1:54.5	Q
2	2	Arnie Sowell	United States	1:56.5	Q
3	2	Evelio Planas	Cuba	1:59.2	Q
4	2	Francisco Miranda	Dominican Republic	?:??.??	
5	2	Jorge Leal	Mexico	?:??.??	
	2	Lucio Martina	Netherlands Antilles	?	
	2	Cyril Johnson	Bahamas	?	
1	3	Juan Miranda	Argentina	1:56.0	Q
2	3	Mal Whitfield	United States	1:56.7	Q
3	3	Waldemiro Monteiro	Brazil	1:56.9	Q
4	3	Waldo Sandoval	Chile	?:??.??	
5	3	Samuel Alvarado	Mexico	?:??.??	
	3	Richard Estick	Jamaica	?	
	3	Filemón Camacho	Venezuela	?	

=== Final ===
Rank	Name	Nationality	Time	Notes
1st place, gold medalist(s)	Arnie Sowell	United States	1:49.86	GR
2nd place, silver medalist(s)	Lon Spurrier	United States	1:50.51	
3rd place, bronze medalist(s)	Ramón Sandoval	Chile	1:52.52	
4	Mal Whitfield	United States	1:52.66	
5	Juan Miranda	Argentina	1:53.31	
6	Argemiro Roque	Brazil	1:53.98	
7	Evelio Planas	Cuba	1:57.69	
8	Waldemiro Monteiro	Brazil	1:57.74	
9	Frank Rivera	Puerto Rico	?:??.??	
