= Bill Butchart =

Australian middle-distance runner (1933–2019)

Personal information
- Full name: Bill Erskine Butchart
- Nationality: Australian
- Born: 15 April 1933
- Died: 1 April 2019 (aged 85)

Sport
- Sport: Middle-distance running
- Event: 800 metres

Bill Erskine Butchart (15 April 1933 – 1 April 2019) was an Australian middle-distance runner. He competed in the men's 800 metres at the 1956 Summer Olympics.
