= Yevgeny Sokolov =

Lithuanian middle-distance runner (born 1931)

Personal information
- Nationality: Lithuanian
- Born: 11 January 1931 Kuršėnai, Lithuania

Sport
- Sport: Middle-distance running
- Event: 1500 metres

Yevgeny Sokolov (born 11 January 1931) is a Lithuanian middle-distance runner. He competed in the men's 1500 metres at the 1956 Summer Olympics, representing the Soviet Union.
