= Gianfranco Baraldi =

Italian sprinter (1935–2026)

Personal information
- National team: Italy: 17 caps (1955–1960)
- Born: 26 August 1935 Latina, Italy
- Died: 19 June 2026 (aged 90) Bergamo, Italy
- Height: 1.81 m (5 ft 11 1/2 in)
- Weight: 64 kg (141 lb)

Sport
- Country: Italy
- Sport: Athletics
- Event: Middle distance running
- Club: Libertas Bergamo

Achievements and titles
- Personal bests: 800 m: 1:49.3 (1958); 1500 m: 3:42.3 (1958)

Gianfranco Baraldi (29 September 1935 – 19 June 2026) was an Italian middle distance runner.

== Biography ==
Gianfranco Baraldi participated at two editions of the Summer Olympics (1956, 1960). He had 17 caps in national team from 1955 to 1960.

He was president for ten years, from 2012 to 2017, of the National Associazione Nazionale Atleti Azzurri d’Italia (Association of Blue Athletes of Italy), ANAAI. In the following four years, Stefano Mei succeeded him, in 2021 he was elected president of the Italian Athletics Federation (FIDAL).

Baraldi died on 19 June 2026, at the age of 90.

== Achievements ==
Year	Competition	Venue	Position	Event	Performance	Note
1956	Olympic Games	(Australia) Melbourne	Heat	800 metres	1:51.9	
1956	Olympic Games	(Australia) Melbourne	Heat	1500 metres	3:52.0	
1960	Olympic Games	(Italy) Rome	Heat	800 metres	1:52.0	

== National titles ==
Gianfranco Baraldi has won 9 times the individual national championship.

- 3 wins in 800 metres (1956, 1958, 1959)
- 4 wins in 1500 metres (1955, 1956, 1957, 1958)
- 1 win in 5000 metres (1957)
- 1 win in Cross country running (1958)

== See also ==
- Italy at the 1956 Summer Olympics
- Italy at the 1960 Summer Olympics
