= Edmund Potrzebowski =

Polish middle-distance runner

Personal information
- Full name: Edmund Czesław Potrzebowski
- Nationality: Polish
- Born: 16 June 1926 Chorzów, Poland
- Died: 22 May 2012 (aged 85) Tsawwassen, Canada
- Height: 1.81 m (5 ft 11 in)
- Weight: 68 kg (150 lb)

Sport
- Sport: Middle-distance running
- Events: 800m, 1500m
- Club: AZS Szczecin (1949–1957)

Edmund Czesław Potrzebowski (16 June 1926 – 22 May 2012) was a Polish middle-distance runner. He competed in the 800 metres and the 1500 metres at the 1952 Summer Olympics.

== International competitions ==
Year	Competition	Venue	Position	Event	Notes
Representing Poland
1952	Olympic Games	Helsinki, Finland	17th (sf)	800 m	1:54.03
1952	Olympic Games	Helsinki, Finland	34th (h)	1500 m	3:56.91
1953	World Festival of Youth and Students	Bucharest, Romania	3rd	800 m	1:51.9
1953	World Festival of Youth and Students	Bucharest, Romania	7th	1500 m	3:52.4
1954	World Student Games	Budapest, Hungary	2nd	800 m	1:50.8
1954	World Student Games	Budapest, Hungary	1st	1500 m	3:49.8
1954	European Championships	Bern, Switzerland	8th (sf)	1500 m	1:51.2
1954	European Championships	Bern, Switzerland	11th (h)	1500 m	3:52.2

== Personal bests ==
- 800 metres – 1:50.7h (Wwarsaw 1954)
- 1000 metres – 2:24.8h (Dresden 1955)
- 1500 metres – 3:48.4h (Wwarsaw 1954)
