= 2001–02 Elitserien season =

- League: Elitserien
- Sport: Ice hockey
- Duration: 18 September 2001 – 5 March 2002

Regular season
- League champion: Färjestad BK
- Season MVP: Henrik Zetterberg (Timrå IK)
- Top scorer: Ulf Söderström (Färjestad BK)

Playoffs
- Finals champions: Färjestad BK
- Runners-up: Modo Hockey

SHL seasons
- ← 2000–01 2002–03 →

The 2001–02 Elitserien season was the 27th season of the Elitserien, the top level of ice hockey in Sweden. 12 teams participated in the league, and Färjestads BK won the championship.

== Standings ==
	Club	GP	W	OTW	OTL	SOW	SOL	L	GF–GA	Pts
1.	Färjestads BK	50	33	7	4	0	5	1	182:100	118
2.	MODO Hockey	50	25	14	3	1	4	3	172:136	93
3.	Djurgårdens IF	50	27	15	0	1	2	5	151:130	91
4.	HV 71 Jönköping	50	24	14	2	4	2	4	156:140	88
5.	Västra Frölunda HC	50	23	19	1	2	3	2	181:150	81
6.	MIF Redhawks	50	19	21	1	1	6	2	138:143	74
7.	Luleå HF	50	15	21	1	1	9	3	140:146	69
8.	Brynäs IF	50	19	24	1	1	2	3	143:164	67
9.	Södertälje SK	50	13	20	3	2	2	10	120:144	61
10.	Linköpings HC	50	14	25	2	1	3	5	132:153	58
11.	AIK Ishockey	50	15	28	0	5	2	0	115:165	54
12.	Timrå IK	50	10	29	1	0	4	6	99:158	46

== Playoffs ==
Quarterfinal
1.	Färjestads BK	4
8.	Brynäs IF	0
4.	HV 71	4
6.	MIF Redhwaks	1
2.	MoDo Hockey	4
7.	Luleå HF	0
3.	Djurgårdens IF	1
5.	Västra Frölunda HC	4

Semifinal
1.	Färjestads BK	3
4.	HV 71	0
2.	MoDo Hockey	3
5.	Västra Frölunda HC	2

Final
1.	Färjestads BK	3
2.	MoDo Hockey	0
