= Manikavagasam Harichandra =

Malaysian middle-distance runner (1930–2022)

Personal information
- Nationality: Malaysian
- Born: 21 July 1930 Port Dickson, Negri Sembilan, Federated Malay States (now Malaysia)
- Died: 29 June 2022 (aged 91) Singapore

Sport
- Sport: Middle-distance running
- Event: 800 metres

Manikavagasam Harichandra (21 July 1930 – 29 June 2022), also known as M. Hari Chandra, was a Malaysian middle-distance runner. He competed in the men's 800 metres at the 1956 Summer Olympics.

== Career ==
At the 1956 Olympics, Chandra finished 7th in his 800 m heat and failed to advance.

He continued to run in masters athletics competitions, winning the silver medal in the 400 m at the 1975 World Association of Veteran Athletes Championships.

Chandra retired from running at age 59, saying, "Once you cannot go across the line as in the past, then it is the right time to retire".

== Personal life ==
Chandra was born in Port Dickson, Negeri Sembilan and was the son of N. Manikavasagam, a national athletics champion and also a 800 metres runner. He started by playing field hockey and cricket before taking up the 800 m. His brother was Mani Jegathesan, regarded as the fastest man in Asia. He had a wife and one child.

Chandra died due to breathing difficulties on 29 June 2022 in Singapore.
