= Olavi Salonen =

Finnish middle-distance runner (1933–2025)

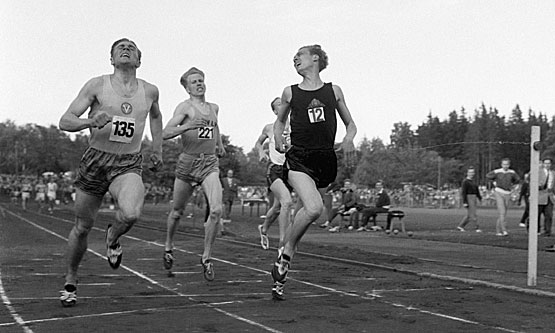
- Salonen (left) in 1957

Personal information
- Nationality: Finnish
- Born: 20 December 1933 Noormarkku, Finland
- Died: 6 March 2025 (aged 91)
- Height: 1.74 m (5 ft 9 in)
- Weight: 74 kg (163 lb)

Sport
- Country: Finland
- Sport: Athletics
- Event: Middle distance running
- Club: RU-38, Kaipolan Vire

Achievements and titles
- Personal best: 1500 m: 3:40.2 (1957)

Olavi Salonen (20 December 1933 – 6 March 2025) was a Finnish athlete who was a world record holder of men's 1500-metre run.

== Biography ==
Salonen participated in the Summer Olympic Games in 1500 m in 1960 and 1964. At the European Athletics Championships he competed twice in 800 metres, in 1958 and 1962.

On 11 July 1957, Salonen ran a 1500-metre race in Turku. He finished second with the same world record time 3:40.2 as the winner Olavi Salsola. The new world record stood only for one day. Czech runner Stanislav Jungwirth ran 3:38.1 on the next day at Stará Boleslav.

Salonen died on 6 March 2025, at the age of 91.

== See also ==
- 1500 metres world record progression

Records
Preceded by (Hungary) István Rózsavölgyi	Men's 1500 m world record holder 11 July 1957 – 12 July 1957; With: Olavi Salsola	Succeeded by (Czech Republic) Stanislav Jungwirth
