= Hofors AIF =

Swedish football club

- Full name: Hofors Allmänna Idrottsförening
- Founded: 1924
- Ground: Stålringen; Hofors; Sweden
- Chairman: Lennart Sköld
- League: Division 4 Gestrikland
Home colours	Away colours

Hofors AIF is a Swedish football club located in Hofors.

== Background ==
Hofors Allmänna Idrottsförening is a sports club from Hofors in Gästrikland and was formed in 1924. The club specialises in football, track and field and skiing. In the past the club has also participated in orienteering, bandy and swimming. The club's top athlete was middle-distance runner Olle Åberg who took part in the Olympics in 1952 and set numerous world records.

Hofors AIF currently plays in Division 4 Gestrikland which is the sixth tier of Swedish football. Between 1940/41 and 1942/43 the club played three seasons in the Second Division which at that time was second tier of the Swedish football league system. They play their home matches at the Stålringen in Hofors.

The club is affiliated to Gestriklands Fotbollförbund. Hofors AIF have competed in the Svenska Cupen on 17 occasions and have played 37 matches in the competition. In the 1950 Svenska Cupen they reached the quarter-finals of the competition before going down 1–6 at home to AIK before 3,090 spectators.

== Season to season ==
In their most successful period Hofors AIF competed in the following divisions:

Season	Level	Division	Section	Position	Movements
1938–39	Tier 3	Division 3	Uppsvenska Västra	4th	
1939–40	Tier 3	Division 3	Uppsvenska Västra	1st	Promotion Playoffs – Promoted
1940–41	Tier 2	Division 2	Norra	8th	
1941–42	Tier 2	Division 2	Norra	4th	
1942–43	Tier 2	Division 2	Norra	9th	Relegated
1943–44	Tier 3	Division 3	Östsvenska Norra	1st	Promotion Playoffs
1944–45	Tier 3	Division 3	Östsvenska Norra	5th	

In recent seasons Hofors AIF have competed in the following divisions:

Season	Level	Division	Section	Position	Movements
1999	Tier 7	Division 6	Gästrikland	1st	Promoted
2000	Tier 6	Division 5	Gästrikland	6th	
2001	Tier 6	Division 5	Gästrikland	7th	
2002	Tier 6	Division 5	Gästrikland	11th	Relegated
2003	Tier 7	Division 6	Gästrikland	3rd	
2004	Tier 7	Division 6	Gästrikland	4th	
2005	Tier 7	Division 6	Gästrikland	1st	Promoted
2006*	Tier 7	Division 5	Gästrikland	2nd	Promoted
2007	Tier 6	Division 4	Gästrikland	8th	
2008	Tier 6	Division 4	Gästrikland	9th	
2009	Tier 6	Division 4	Gästrikland	5th	
2010	Tier 6	Division 4	Gästrikland	4th	
2011	Tier 6	Division 4	Gästrikland	1st	Promoted

* League restructuring in 2006 resulted in a new division being created at Tier 3 and subsequent divisions dropping a level.
