= Hofors Municipality =

Hofors Municipality Hofors kommun
- Municipality
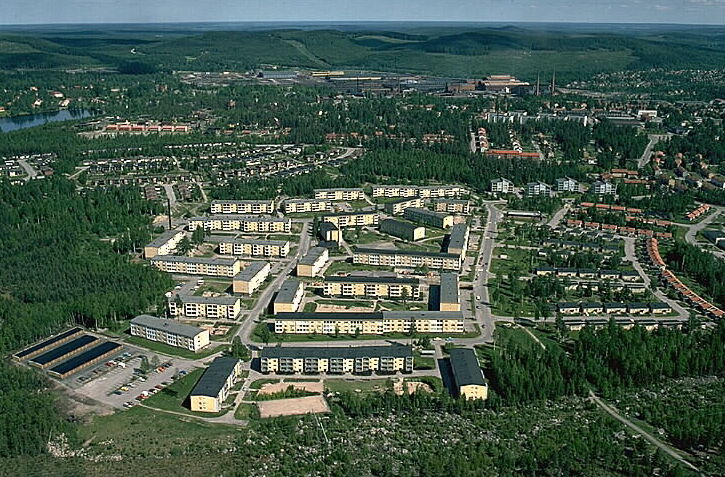

- Flag Coat of arms

- Coordinates: 60°33′N 16°17′E
- Country: Sweden
- County: Gävleborg County
- Seat: Hofors

Area
  - Total: 445.71 km^{2} (172.09 sq mi)
  - Land: 409.94 km^{2} (158.28 sq mi)
  - Water: 35.77 km^{2} (13.81 sq mi)
- Area as of 1 January 2014.

Population (30 June 2025)
  - Total: 9,216
  - Density: 22.48/km^{2} (58.23/sq mi)
- Time zone: UTC+1 (CET)
  - Summer (DST): UTC+2 (CEST)
- ISO 3166 code: SE
- Province: Gästrikland
- Municipal code: 2104
- Website: www.hofors.se

Hofors Municipality (Swedish: Hofors kommun) is a municipality in Gävleborg County, east central Sweden. Its seat is in Hofors with 7,400 inhabitants, situated at 60°33′N 16°17′E.

The first municipality with the name of Hofors was broken away from Torsåker in 1925. In 1971 the two entities were reunited to form the present municipality.

The coat of arms stem from 1968, and is derived from a map from 1539, where the town Hofors was surrounded by iron mines. ().

== Geography ==
Nearest cities are Gävle, 50 kilometers away, and Falun, 30 kilometers away.

=== Localities ===
- Hofors (seat)
- Torsåker

== Demographics ==
This is a demographic table based on Hofors Municipality's electoral districts in the 2022 Swedish general election sourced from SVT's election platform, in turn taken from SCB official statistics.

In total there were 7,375 Swedish citizens of voting age resident in the municipality. 50.8% voted for the left coalition and 48.1% for the right coalition. Indicators are in percentage points except population totals and income.

Location	Residents	Citizen adults	Left vote	Right vote	Employed	Swedish parents	Foreign heritage	Income SEK	Degree
Location			%	%					
Hofors C	1,982	1,442	58.6	39.6	70	68	32	20,254	18
Hofors N	1,915	1,536	53.0	46.5	87	85	15	28,454	29
Hofors S	1,972	1,510	49.2	49.7	86	87	13	27,872	23
Hofors V	1,488	1,111	55.1	43.3	65	63	37	18,651	18
Torsåker	2,205	1,776	44.3	54.9	85	94	6	25,849	29
Source: SVT

== Sister cities ==
Two sister cities:

- Denmark: Fladså,
- Finland: Kontiolahti

Until recently, Tokke Municipality in Norway was a sister city, but it has for some reason been discontinued. (Source: )
