= Molly Johnson (writer) =

Swedish novelist (1931–2016)

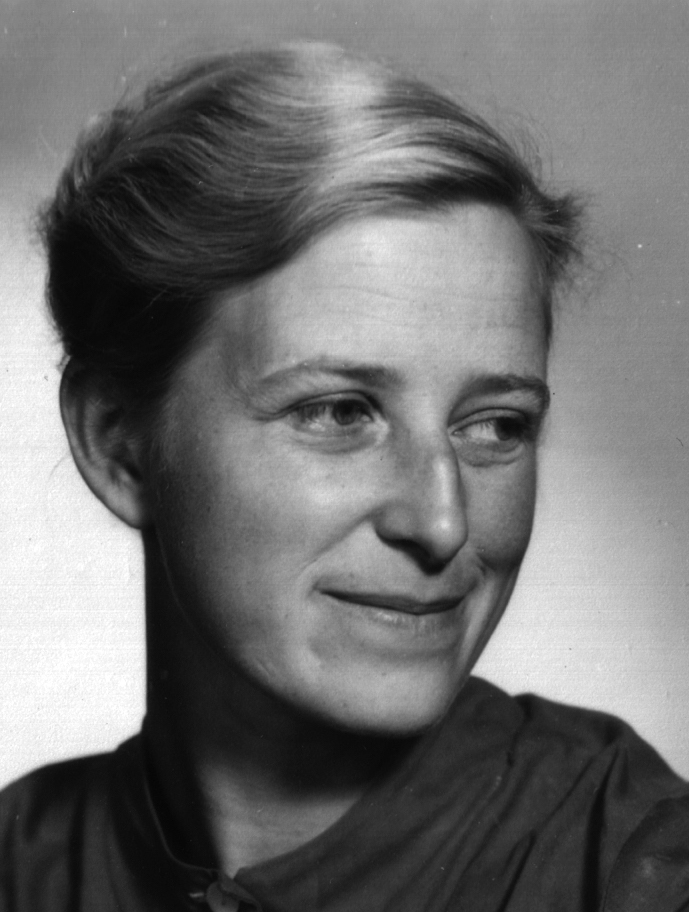
- Molly Johnson (c. 1955)
- Born: 24 January 1931; Hofors, Sweden
- Died: 29 November 2016 (aged 85); Stockholm, Sweden
- Spouse: Åke Fredrik Forselius (1950–1983)

Molly Majbritt Emilia Johnson (24 January 1931 – 29 November 2016) was a Swedish novelist from Hofors who was brought up in a working-class family. She made her debut with Pansarkryssaren (The Battleship) when she was just 24. Inspired by Sergei Eisenstein's silent film Battleship Potemkin, it tells the story of a spontaneous rebellion on a ship travelling to an industrial town in Sweden and has been described as a "modern classic". Apart from a children's book in 1956, it took thirty years before she published her second novel Morbror Anders (Uncle Anders) in 1984. Johnson also contributed articles to newspapers and journals.

== Early life and family ==
Born in Hofors in east central Sweden on 24 January 1931, Molly Majbritt Emilia Johnson was the daughter of Erik Gunnar Jonsson and his wife Linnea Emilia née Andersson. She was the eldest of the family's three daughters. Brought up in a working-class environment, after obtaining her school leaving certificate she studied at the Poppius School of Journalism. She later took courses at the Stockholm Institute of Journalism (1961–62). In 1950, she married Åke Fredrik Forselius with whom she had three children: Tilda Maria, Dordi Anna Linnea and Frederik Gunnar. The marriage was dissolved in 1983.

== Career ==
After leaving school, Johnson spent time in both England and Germany where she helped with recovery after the Second World War. Working for the Service Civil International at a camp in bombed out Hildesheim, she met her husband Åke Forselius and moved with him to the Dalarna Region. She travelled widely, not only in Europe but also in North America and to Zimbabwe in Africa.

When she was only 24, Johnson made a sensational debut with her novel Panzerkryssaren based on Sergei Eisenstein's Battlecruiser Potemkin. Imagining how Russians could sail their warship up the river to her native Hofors and rescue steel workers from their dismal tasks, she wrote a social satire in a distinctive new style of her own. Commenting on the novel in Dagens Nyheter, the critic Ingrid Arvidsson wrote: "...the prose is brand new, precise and untamed, fresh and fantastic." Drawing on a technique comparable to a screenplay for a film, she mixes passages from letters and reports and spoken dialect with convincing narration.

Her later novel Morbror Anders also addresses the modest aspirations and limitations of a member of the working class who ends up dying after spending thirty years in a mental institution. From an early age, Johnson had experienced how easily the dreams and talents of working people could be suppressed. In her novels, she raises the question of how "revolution" could lead to improved living conditions for the lower classes based on a new appreciation of Christian values.

Molly Johnson died in Stockholm on 29 November 2016.
