= Athletics at the 1955 Pan American Games – Men's 1500 metres =

Men's 1500 metres at the Pan American Games

The men's 1500 metres event at the 1955 Pan American Games was held at the Estadio Universitario in Mexico City on 17 and 19 March.

== Medalists ==
Gold	Silver	Bronze
Juan Miranda; Argentina	Wes Santee; United States	Fred Dwyer; United States

== Results ==
=== Heats ===
Rank	Heat	Name	Nationality	Time	Notes
1	1	Juan Miranda	Argentina	4:05.63	Q
2	1	Wes Santee	United States	4:05.65	Q
3	1	Sebastião Mendes	Brazil	4:12.94	Q
4	1	Bob McMillen	United States	4:15.73	Q
5	1	Eduardo Fontecilla	Chile	4:15.92	Q
6	1	Alfonso Díaz	Mexico	4:20.8	
	1	Francisco Miranda	Dominican Republic	?	
	1	Lucio Martina	Netherlands Antilles	?	
	1	Samuel Alvarado	Mexico	?	
1	2	Filemón Camacho	Venezuela	4:31.4	Q
2	2	Jesús González	Mexico	4:32.6	Q
3	2	Edgard Mitt	Brazil	4:34.4	Q
4	2	Guillermo Solá	Chile	4:34.8	Q
5	2	Fred Dwyer	United States	4:34.8	Q
6	2	Emérito Estrella	Dominican Republic	4:35.8	
	2	Gilberto Miora	Argentina	DNS	
	2	Osvaldo Suárez	Argentina	DNS	

=== Final ===
Rank	Name	Nationality	Time	Notes
1st place, gold medalist(s)	Juan Miranda	Argentina	3:53.30	GR
2nd place, silver medalist(s)	Wes Santee	United States	3:53.44	
3rd place, bronze medalist(s)	Fred Dwyer	United States	3:56.04	
4	Bob McMillen	United States	4:04.74	
5	Guillermo Solá	Chile	4:06.67	
6	Filemón Camacho	Venezuela	4:08.0	
	Sebastião Mendes	Brazil	?	
	Eduardo Fontecilla	Chile	?	
	Jesús González	Mexico	?	
	Edgard Mitt	Brazil	?	
