= 1000 metres world record progression =

The following tables show the world record progression in the men's and women's 1000 metres as ratified by World Athletics.

== Men ==
The first world record in the men's 1000 metres was recognised by IAAF in 1913.

Ratified
Not ratified
Ratified but later rescinded
Pending ratification

Time	Athlete	Country	Venue	Date
2:32.3	Georg Mickler	Germany	Hanover	1913-06-22
2:29.1	Anatole Bolin	Sweden	Stockholm	1918-09-22
2:28.6	Sven Lundgren	Sweden	Stockholm	1922-09-27
2:26.8	Séra Martin	France	Colombes	1926-09-30
2:25.8	Otto Peltzer	Germany	Colombes	1927-09-18
2:23.6	Jules Ladoumègue	France	Paris	1930-10-19
2:21.5	Rudolf Harbig	Germany	Dresden	1941-05-24
2:21.4	Rune Gustafsson	Sweden	Borås	1946-09-04
2:21.4	Marcel Hansenne	France	Gothenburg	1948-08-27
2:21.3	Olle Åberg	Sweden	Copenhagen	1952-08-10
2:21.2	Stanislav Jungwirth	Czechoslovakia	Stará Boleslav	1952-10-27
2:20.8	Mal Whitfield	United States	Eskilstuna	1953-08-16
2:20.4	Audun Boysen	Norway	Oslo	1953-09-17
2:19.5	Audun Boysen	Norway	Gävle	1954-08-18
2:19.0	Audun Boysen	Norway	Gothenburg	1955-08-30
2:19.0	István Rózsavölgyi	Hungary	Tata	1955-09-21
2:18.1	Dan Waern	Sweden	Turku	1958-09-19
2:17.8	Dan Waern	Sweden	Karlstad	1959-08-21
2:16.7	Siegfried Valentin	East Germany	Potsdam	1960-07-19
2:16.6	Peter Snell	New Zealand	Auckland	1964-11-12
2:16.2	Jürgen May	East Germany	Erfurt	1965-07-20
2:16.2	Franz-Josef Kemper	West Germany	Hanover	1966-09-21
2:16.0	Danie Malan	South Africa	Munich	1973-06-24
2:13.9	Rick Wohlhuter	United States	Oslo	1974-07-30
2:13.40	Sebastian Coe	Great Britain	Oslo	1980-07-01
2:12.18	Sebastian Coe	Great Britain	Oslo	1981-07-11
2:11.96	Noah Ngeny	Kenya	Rieti	1999-09-05
2:11.83	Emmanuel Wanyonyi	Kenya	Fontvieille	2026-07-10

== Women ==
The first world record in the women's 1000 metres was recognised by the IAAF in 1922.

Time	Athlete	Country	Venue	Date
3:17.4	Georgette Lenoir	France	Paris	1922-08-06
3:12.0	Lucie Bréard	France	Paris	1922-08-20
3:08.2	Edith Trickey	Great Britain	London	1924-08-04
3:06.6	Lina Radke	Germany	Brzeg	1930-08-24
3:04.4	Gladys Lunn	Great Britain	London	1931-05-16
3:02.5	Stanisława Walasiewicz	Poland	Katowice	1933-10-08
3:00.6	Gladys Lunn	Great Britain	Birmingham	1934-06-23
2:35.9	Gunhild Hoffmeister	East Germany	Potsdam	1972-08-20
2:35.0	Karin Krebs	East Germany	Potsdam	1974-08-28
2:33.8	Nikolina Shtereva	Bulgaria	Sofia	1976-07-04
2:30.67	Christine Wachtel	East Germany	West Berlin	1990-08-17
2:29.34	Maria Mutola	Mozambique	Brussels	1995-08-05
2:28.98	Svetlana Masterkova	Russia	Brussels	1996-08-23
