= Ted Wheeler (runner) =

American middle-distance runner (1931–2022)

Personal information
- Nationality: American
- Born: January 30, 1931 Chattanooga, Tennessee, U.S.
- Died: November 17, 2022 (aged 91) Iowa City, Iowa, U.S.

Sport
- Country: United States
- Sport: Track
- Event: 1500 m
- College team: Iowa

Ted Wheeler (January 30, 1931 – November 17, 2022) was an American middle-distance runner. He competed in the men's 1500 metres at the 1956 Summer Olympics.

Wheeler was an All-American runner for the Iowa Hawkeyes track and field team, finishing 5th in the 1500 m at the 1952 NCAA track and field championships and 1956 NCAA track and field championships.
