= Ulf Söderström =

Swedish ice hockey player

- Born: September 19, 1972 (age 52); Hofors, Sweden
- Height: 6 ft 0 in (183 cm)
- Weight: 194 lb (88 kg; 13 st 12 lb)
- Position: Centre
- Shot: Left
- Played for: Linköpings HC; Färjestad BK
- National team: Sweden
- Playing career: 1987–2009

Ulf Söderström (born September 19, 1972) is a Swedish former professional ice hockey centre. During his career, Söderström played in the Elitserien for Linköping HC and Färjestads BK. For his achievements during the 2001–2002 season, he was awarded Guldhjälmen.

== Career statistics ==
			Regular season					Playoffs
Season	Team	League	GP	G	A	Pts	PIM	GP	G	A	Pts	PIM
1987–88	Hofors HC	SWE.3	3	1	3	4		—	—	—	—	—
1988–89	Hofors HC	SWE.3	29	13	17	30		—	—	—	—	—
1989–90	Hofors HC	SWE.3	32	8	28	36		—	—	—	—	—
1990–91	Hofors HC	SWE.3	32	22	39	61	26	—	—	—	—	—
1991–92	Väsby IK HK	SWE.2	27	2	7	9	8	—	—	—	—	—
1992–93	Hofors HC	SWE.3	32	31	31	62	30	—	—	—	—	—
1993–94	Hofors HC	SWE.2	32	16	22	38	36	—	—	—	—	—
1994–95	Linköpings HC	SWE.2	32	8	5	13	41	—	—	—	—	—
1995–96	Linköpings HC	SWE.2	32	6	20	26	36	4	0	4	4	0
1996–97	Linköpings HC	SWE.2	32	14	36	50	28	13	3	5	8	8
1997–98	Linköpings HC	SWE.2	31	21	39	60	84	10	4	6	10	10
1998–99	Linköpings HC	SWE.2	42	29	41	70	40	10	6	10	16	4
1999–2000	Linköpings HC	SEL	49	8	19	27	32	—	—	—	—	—
2000–01	Färjestad BK	SEL	45	19	21	40	30	15	3	9	12	12
2001–02	Färjestad BK	SEL	49	16	34	50	65	6	2	3	5	2
2002–03	Färjestad BK	SEL	45	10	19	29	45	14	1	5	6	6
2003–04	Färjestad BK	SEL	49	9	14	23	24	17	3	5	8	6
2004–05	Linköpings HC	SEL	41	5	6	11	12	—	—	—	—	—
2005–06	Linköpings HC	SEL	50	11	21	32	61	13	3	5	8	10
2006–07	Linköpings HC	SEL	41	9	7	16	36	15	3	4	7	6
2007–08	Mjölby HC	SWE.4	26	25	43	68		—	—	—	—	—
2008–09	Mjölby HC	SWE.3	28	18	28	46	30	—	—	—	—	—
SWE.2 totals			200	78	142	220	236	37	13	25	38	22
SEL totals			369	88	140	228	305	86	15	31	46	42
