= Turhan Göker =

Turkish athlete (1930–2022)

Personal information
- Nationality: Turkish
- Born: 11 February 1930 Kadıköy, Turkey
- Died: 5 November 2022 (aged 92) Istanbul, Turkey
- Education: Robert College, Istanbul
- Occupation(s): Track and field athlete
- Years active: 1940s-

Sport
- Now coaching: Bulent Ulukut

Achievements and titles
- Olympic finals: 1952 Helsinki Olympics
- Regional finals: Balkan Games
- Updated on 21 August 2015

Turhan Göker (11 February 1930 - 5 November 2022) was a Turkish track and field athlete who, starting in 1949, represented Turkey as an athlete in national and international championships.

== Biography ==
Göker started in the juniors’ team of Fenerbahce Track/Athletics and soon broke the records for 800, 1,000, and 2,000-meters in the national championships for Turkey. In 1949, Göker became the champion by winning the national 800-meters juniors’ of Turkey. In two weeks time after the championship, Fenerbahce Sports upgraded Goker into the seniors’ team. Göker then became the champion of 800-meters nationals for seniors by 1’59’’2’’’.

Notable international appearances

- 1952 Helsinki Olympics
- 1954 Bern Euro Athletics Championship
- 1955 Barcelona International Mediterranean Games
- 1953 Balkan Games
- 1954 Balkan Games
- 1955 Balkan Games

Listed Below are Göker's highest rankings

- 400-meters ------------------------ 51.8
- 800-meters ------------------------ 1.54.0
- 1,500-meters ----------------------- 3.52.4
- 3,000-meters ----------------------- 8.35.2
- 3,000-meters Steeplechase ---- 9.49.2
- 5,000-meters ------------------------15.15.2

Göker's continued being involved with athletics, including being a member of the Fenerbahce Sports Athletics and National Athletics Federation and executive member to the statistical administration branch of the National Athletics Federation. In 1966, he was offered membership in A.T.F.S., The International Athletics Annual. He also contributed as a council member in the National Olympics Committee, the Fair Play Commission, the Turkey Sports Foundation, the Olympian Guild, the Fenerbahce Sports Club, the Hilal (Crescent) Sports Club and the Marmara Sailing Club.
