= Dimitrios Konstantinidis =

Greek middle-distance runner

Personal information
- Nationality: Greek
- Born: 13 March 1933 (age 93)

Sport
- Sport: Middle-distance running
- Event: 800 metres

Dimitrios Konstantinidis (born 13 March 1933) is a Greek middle-distance runner. He competed in the men's 800 metres at the 1956 Summer Olympics.
