= Olavi Salsola =

Finnish middle-distance runner

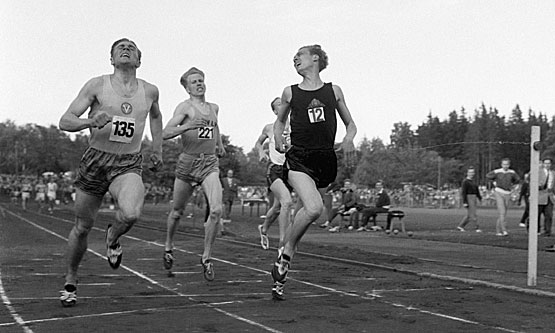
- Olavi Salsola (right, with #12)

Personal information
- Full name: Olavi Armas Tapani Salsola
- Nationality: Finnish
- Born: 26 December 1933 Keuruu, Finland
- Died: 8 October 1995 (aged 61) Rauma, Finland
- Height: 1.80 m (5 ft 11 in)
- Weight: 65 kg (143 lb)

Sport
- Country: Finland
- Sport: Athletics
- Event: Middle distance running
- Club: Turun Urheiluliitto

Achievements and titles
- Personal best: 1500 m: 3:40.2 (1957)

Olavi Salsola (26 December 1933 in Keuruu – 8 October 1995 in Rauma) was a Finnish male middle distance runner.

== Biography ==
In 1957, in the Finnish city of Turku, there was an event for the sport of athletics. Three Finnish athletes had gone under the previous world record of 1500 metres, all three were called by first name Olavi and all three were born in 1933. For this reason, the three athletes are today remembered as "the three Olavis".

== World record ==
- 1500 metres: 3:40.2 - (Finland) Turku, 11 July 1957

== Olympic results ==
Year	Competition	Venue	Position	Event	Time	Notes
1956	Olympic Games	(Australia) Melbourne	Heat	1500 metres	3:55.00	

== See also ==
- 1500 metres world record progression

Records
Preceded by (Hungary) István Rózsavölgyi	Men's 1500 m World Record Holder; 11 July 1957 – 12 July 1957	Succeeded by (Czech Republic) Stanislav Jungwirth
