= Neville Scott =

New Zealand middle- and long-distance runner

Medal record

Men's Athletics

Representing New Zealand

British Empire and Commonwealth Games
Bronze medal – third place	1958 Cardiff	3 miles

Neville Ian Scott (25 February 1935 – 21 January 2005) was a New Zealand middle-distance runner from Ashburton.

At the 1958 British Empire and Commonwealth Games Scott won the bronze medal in the men's 3 miles. He also competed in the mile where he placed 9th.

Scott competed at the 1956 Summer Olympics, where he finished 7th in the 1500 metres. He made his second Olympic appearance at the 1964 Summer Olympics where he came 11th in the 5000 metres. Over his running career he set New Zealand records over 1500 metres, 2 miles and 3 miles.
