= André Ballieux =

Belgian middle-distance runner

Personal information
- Nationality: Belgian
- Born: 2 August 1933 (age 92)

Sport
- Sport: Middle-distance running
- Event: 1500 metres

André Ballieux (born 2 August 1933) is a Belgian middle-distance runner. He competed in the men's 1500 metres at the 1956 Summer Olympics.
