= Hofors =

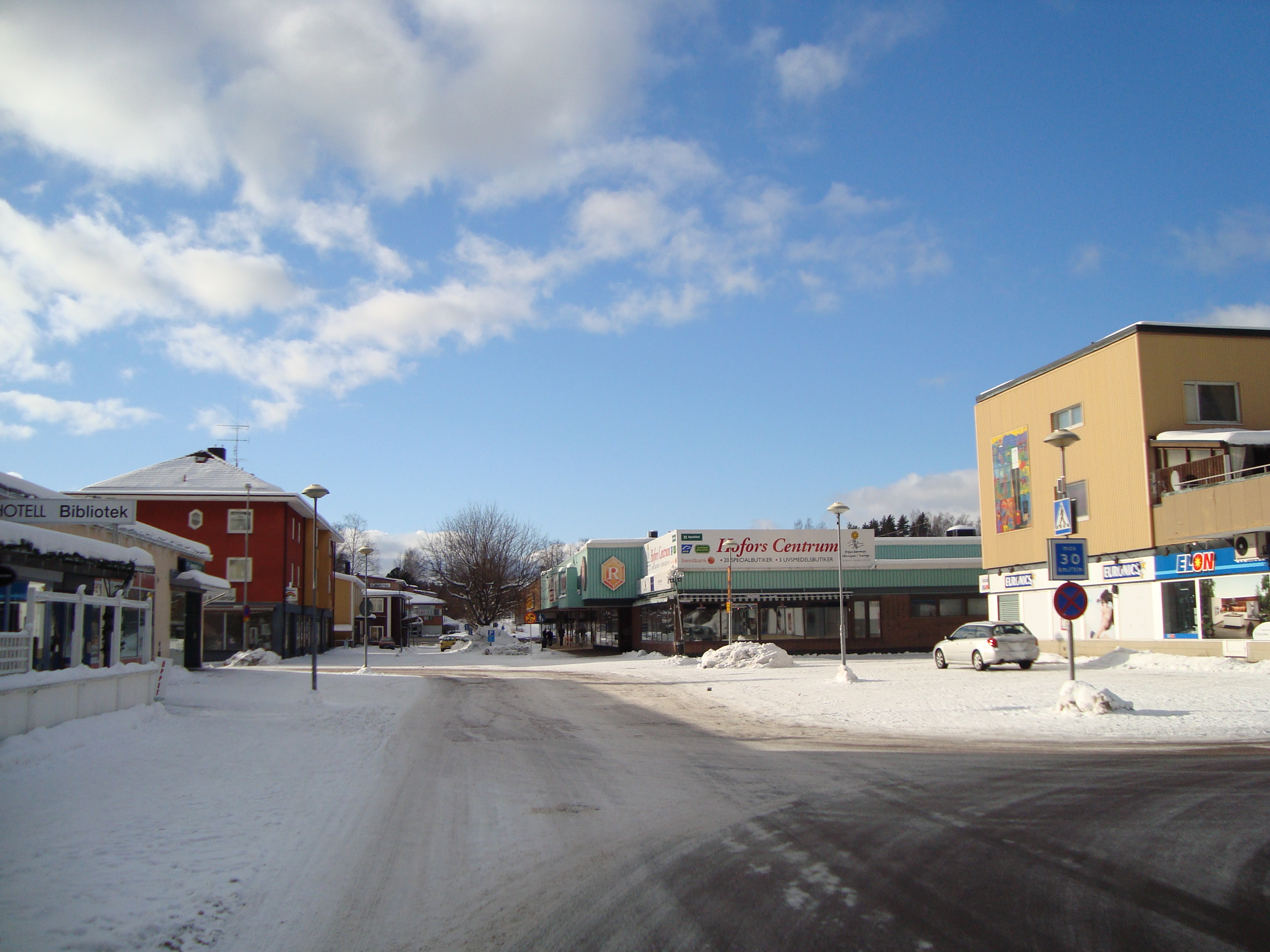
- Central Hofors in February 2009

- Coat of arms

- Location within Sweden Gävleborg Location within Sweden
- Coordinates: 60°33′N 16°17′E
- Country: Sweden
- Province: Gästrikland
- County: Gävleborg County
- Municipality: Hofors Municipality

Area
  - Total: 6.97 km^{2} (2.69 sq mi)

Population (31 December 2010)
  - Total: 6,681
  - Density: 958/km^{2} (2,480/sq mi)
- Time zone: UTC+1 (CET)
  - Summer (DST): UTC+2 (CEST)

Hofors (Swedish pronunciation: [ˈhûːfɔʂ]) is a locality and the seat of Hofors Municipality, Gävleborg County, Sweden with 6,681 inhabitants in 2010.

== Districts ==
- Born
- Böle
- Bönhusberget
- Centrum
- Göklund
- Hammaren
- Lillån
- Muntebo
- Rönningen
- Silverdalen
- Standarn
- Västerhöjden
- Robertsholm
- Fagersta by
- Långnäs
- Barkhyttan
- Stenshyttan

The town of Hofors evolved around an iron industry in the 17th century, which eventually developed into one of Sweden's foremost ironworks, and a subsidiary of the SKF group.

== Notable people ==
- Kerstin Hesselgren, first woman elected into the upper house of Swedish parliament
- Andreas Johansson, former NHL player
- Molly Johnson (1931–2016), novelist
- Ulf Söderström, ice hockey player
- Lasse Åberg, artist, actor, film director and musician

== Sports ==
The following sports clubs are located in Hofors:

- Hofors AIF
- https://hoforsbgk.se Hofors BGK
- Hofors HC

Hofors World Cup was an international rink bandy competition played annually 1984–1998.
