= Klaus Richtzenhain =

East German middle-distance runner (1934–2025)

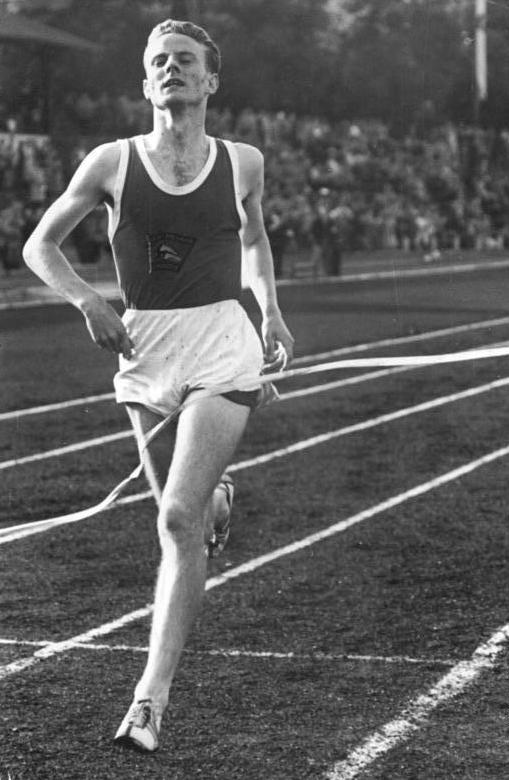
- Richtzenhain in 1956

Medal record

Men's athletics

Representing Germany
Silver medal – second place	1956 Melbourne	1500 metres

Klaus Richtzenhain (1 November 1934 – March 2025) was an East German athlete who competed mainly in the 1,500 metres.

== Biography ==
Richtzenhain competed for the United Team of Germany in the 1956 Summer Olympics held in Melbourne in the 1,500 metres where he won the silver medal. On 6 March 2025, it was announced that Richtzenhain had died at the age of 90.
