= Émile Leva =

Belgian middle-distance runner

Personal information
- Nationality: Belgian
- Born: 13 December 1931 (age 94)

Sport
- Sport: Middle-distance running
- Event: 800 metres

Émile Leva (born 13 December 1931) is a Belgian middle-distance runner. He competed in the men's 800 metres at the 1956 Summer Olympics.
