= Guillermo Solá =

Chilean athlete (1929–2020)

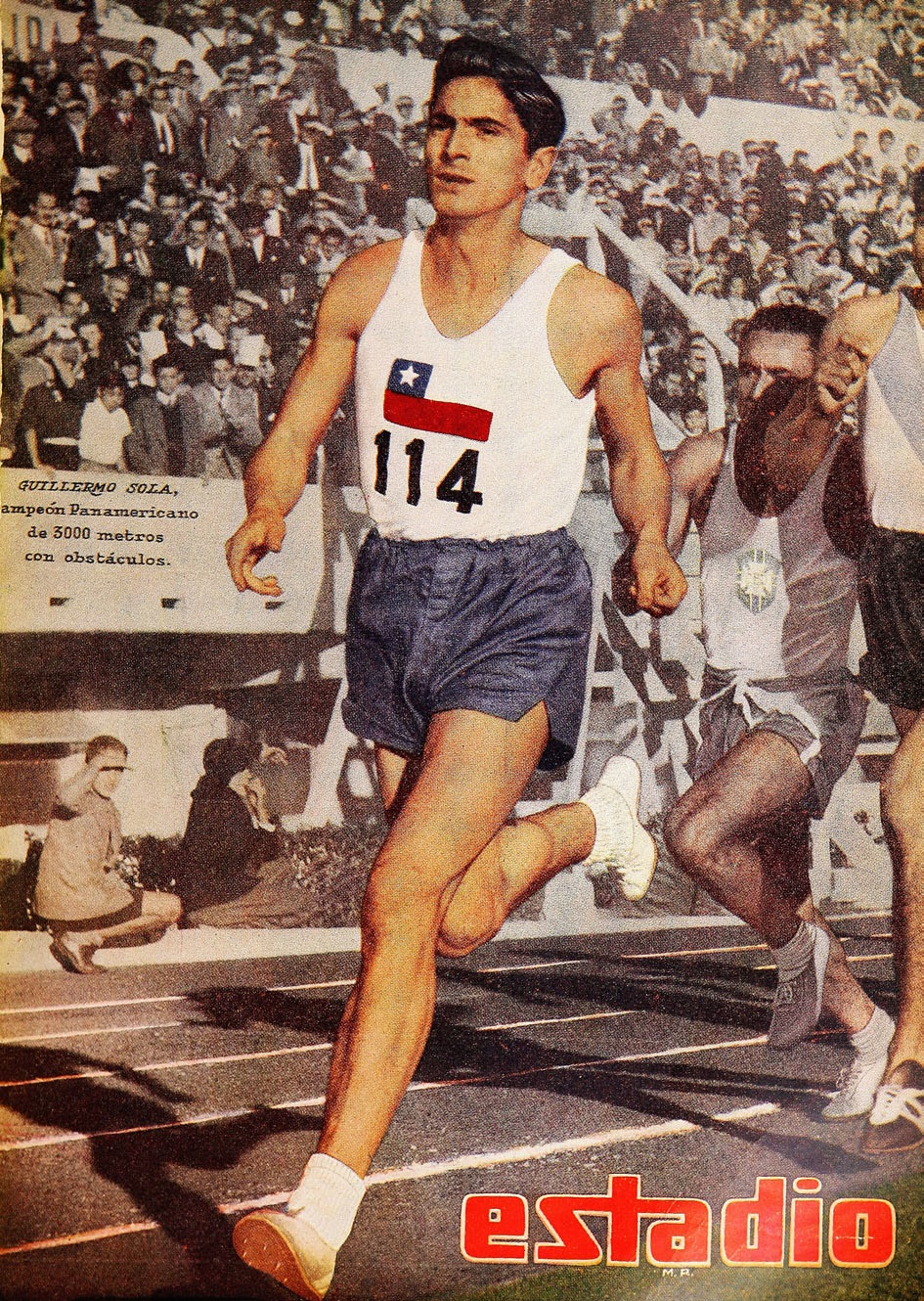

Personal information
- Full name: Guillermo Solá Aravena
- Born: July 25, 1929 Valparaiso, Chile
- Died: February 24, 2020 (aged 90) Santiago, Chile
- Height: 1.66 m (5 ft 5 in)
- Weight: 53 kg (117 lb)
Medal record
Men's Athletics
Representing Chile
Pan American Games
Gold medal – first place	1955 Mexico City	3.000 m Steeplechase

Guillermo Solá Aravena (July 25, 1929 – February 24, 2020) was a middle- and long-distance runner from Chile. He won the gold medal in the men's 3,000 metres steeplechase event at the 1955 Pan American Games, and he won silver medal in the men's 1,500 meters steeplechase event at the 1951 Pan American Games. Solá represented his native South American country at the 1952 Summer Olympics in Helsinki, Finland.

== International competitions ==
Year	Competition	Venue	Position	Event	Notes
Representing Chile
1951	Pan American Games	Buenos Aires, Argentina	2nd	1500 m	4:00.5
1951	Pan American Games	Buenos Aires, Argentina	5th	3000 m s'chase	10:10.3
1952	South American Championships	Buenos Aires, Argentina	2nd	1500 m	3:59.6
1952	South American Championships	Buenos Aires, Argentina	1st	3000 m s'chase	9:32.0
1952	Olympic Games	Helsinki, Finland	29th (h)	3000 m s'chase	9:32.2
1953	South American Championships (unofficial)	Santiago, Chile	1st	1500 m	3:58.6
1953	South American Championships (unofficial)	Santiago, Chile	1st	3000 m s'chase	9:25.3
1954	South American Championships	São Paulo, Brazil	2nd	1500 m	3:57.2
1954	South American Championships	São Paulo, Brazil	2nd	3000 m s'chase	9:16.0
1955	Pan American Games	Mexico City, Mexico	5th	1500 m	4:06.67
1955	Pan American Games	Mexico City, Mexico	1st	3000 m s'chase	9:46.8
1956	South American Championships	Santiago, Chile	3rd	3000 m s'chase	9:25.8

== Personal bests ==
- 3000 metres steeplechase – 9:16.0h (1954)
