= Mahmoud Jan =

Pakistani middle-distance runner (born 1930)

Personal information
- Nationality: Pakistani
- Born: 1930

Sport
- Sport: Middle-distance running
- Event: 800 metres

Mahmoud Jan (born 1930) is a Pakistani middle-distance runner. He competed in the men's 800 metres at the 1956 Summer Olympics.
