= Curt Stone =

American long-distance runner (1922–2021)

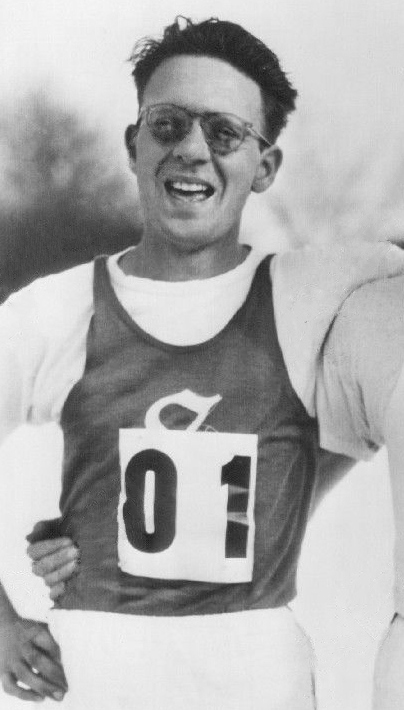
- Stone in 1949

Personal information
- Full name: Curtis Charles Stone
- Born: November 19, 1922 Brooklyn, Pennsylvania, U.S.
- Died: July 30, 2021 (aged 98) Kent, Ohio, U.S.
- Height: 175 cm (5 ft 9 in)
- Weight: 61 kg (134 lb)

Sport
- Sport: Athletics
- Events: 1500–10,000 m, steeplechase
- Club: New York Athletic Club

Achievements and titles
- Personal bests: 1500 m – 3:55.2 (1950); 5000 m – 14:27.0 (1952); 10,000 m – 30:33.4 (1952); 3000 mS – 9:08.6 (1950)
Medal record
Men's athletics
Representing the United States
Pan American Games
Gold medal – first place	1951 Buenos Aires	10,000 metres
Gold medal – first place	1951 Buenos Aires	Steeplechase

Curtis Charles Stone (November 19, 1922 – July 30, 2021) was an American long-distance runner. He competed in the 5000 m at the 1948, 1952 and 1956 Olympics with the best result of sixth place in 1948. He also competed in the 10000 m at the 1952 Olympics.

== Biography ==
During World War II, beginning in 1943, Stone served in Europe with the 95th Air Base Wing, a unit of the U.S. Army Air Forces that was based at RAF Horham in England, working for one and a half years as a finance clerk.

During the 3,000 m steeplechase at the 1951 Pan American Games, Stone was easily ahead but slowed on the final straightaway to allow teammate Browning Ross to catch up. The two crossed the finish line hand in hand forcing a tie for first place. Argentine officials debated whether to disqualify the pair for helping each other, but ultimately let the results stand, ranking Stone as first after a close examination of the finish photograph. At those Games, Stone also won the 10,000 m and placed fourth in the 1500 m final.

Stone won 13 AAU titles, including four in the 6-miles/10,000 m in 1951–54 and three in the 5000 m in 1947–48 and 1952. During World War II he served in the 95th Air Base Wing near Horham, England. He then graduated from the Pennsylvania State University in 1947, defended a PhD in education there in 1963, and became a professor at Kent State University. As of 2021, he was retired and living in Brooklyn Township, Susquehanna County, eastern Pennsylvania.

Stone died on July 30, 2021, at The KentRidge Senior Living in Kent, Ohio, at the age of 98.

== See also ==
- List of Pennsylvania State University Olympians
