= Dan Waern =

Swedish middle-distance runner

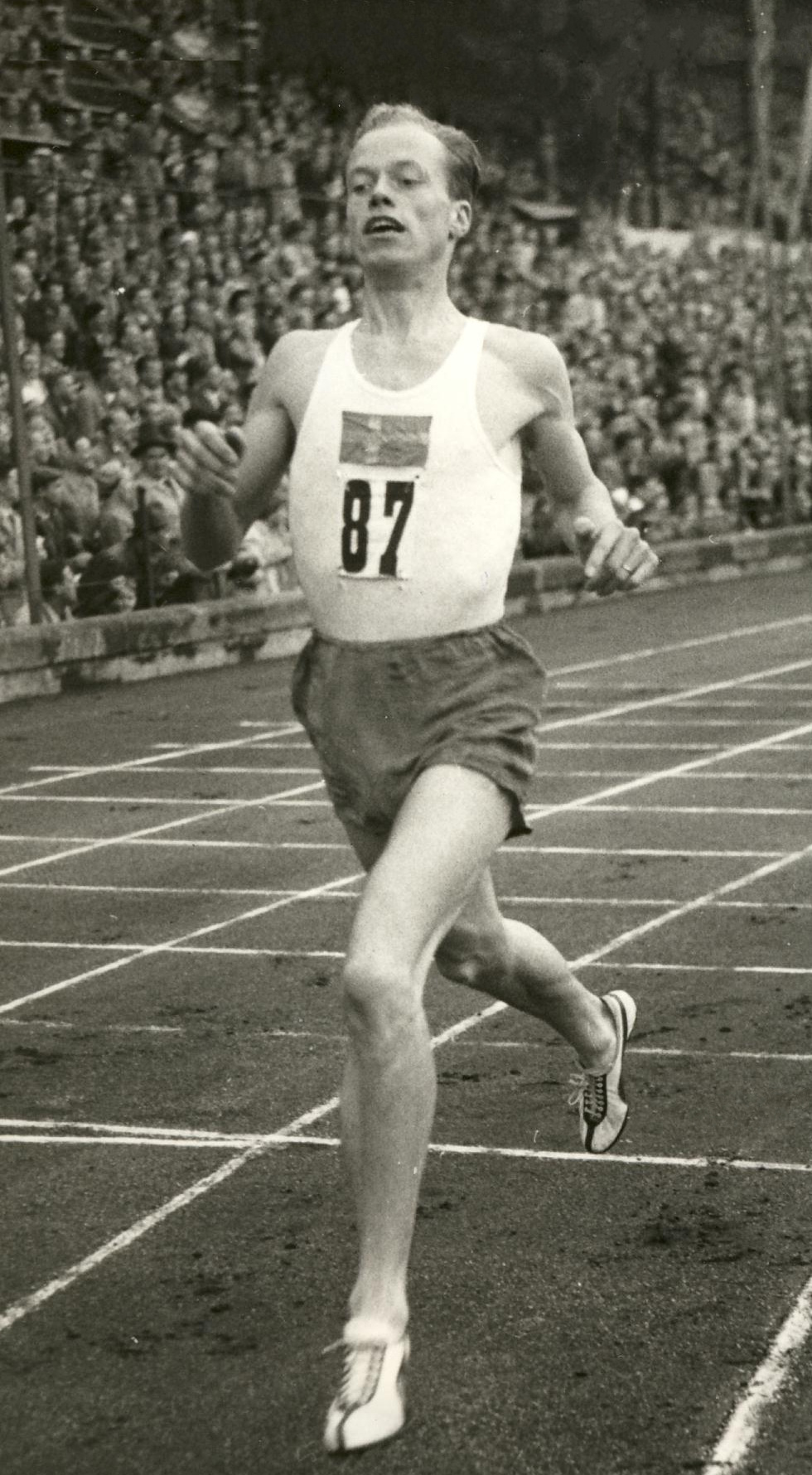
- Dan Waern in the 1950's

Personal information
- Born: 17 January 1933 (age 93) Katrineholm, Sweden
- Height: 1.82 m (6 ft 0 in)
- Weight: 66 kg (146 lb)

Sport
- Country: Sweden
- Sport: track and field
- Club: Flens IF; Gefle IF; Örgryte IS

Achievements and titles
- Personal bests: 800 m – 1:47.5 (1961); 1500 m – 3:38.6 (1960); Mile – 3:58.5 (1957)
Medal record
Men's athletics
Representing Sweden
European Championships
Silver medal – second place	1958 Stockholm	1500 m

Dan Waern (born 17 January 1933) is a retired Swedish middle-distance runner, who in 1957 became the first Swede to run a sub-four-minute mile. The same year he was awarded the Svenska Dagbladet Gold Medal.

Waern competed in the 1500 m at the 1956 and 1960 Olympics and finished fourth in 1960. Earlier in 1958 he won a silver medal at the European championships over 1500 m and set a world record in the 1000 m. In 1961, he was disqualified by the IAAF for professionalism.

Waern held Swedish titles in the 800 m (1958–60) and 1500 m (1956–61).

Awards
Preceded by Lars Hall and Sixten Jernberg	Svenska Dagbladet Gold Medal; 1957	Succeeded by Richard Dahl
