= Günter Dohrow =

German middle-distance runner

Personal information
- Nationality: German
- Born: 15 August 1927
- Died: 27 June 2008 (aged 80)

Sport
- Sport: Middle-distance running
- Event: 800 metres

Günter Dohrow (15 August 1927 – 27 June 2008) was a German middle-distance runner. He competed in the men's 800 metres at the 1956 Summer Olympics.
