= Gunnar Nielsen (athlete) =

Danish middle-distance runner

Medal record

Men's athletics

Representing Denmark

European Championships
Silver medal – second place	1954 Bern	1500 m

Niels Gunnar Nielsen (25 March 1928 – 29 May 1985) was a Danish middle distance runner who equalled the world record over both 880 yards and 1500 metres. He represented the Østerbro-based club Københavns Idræts Forening throughout his career.

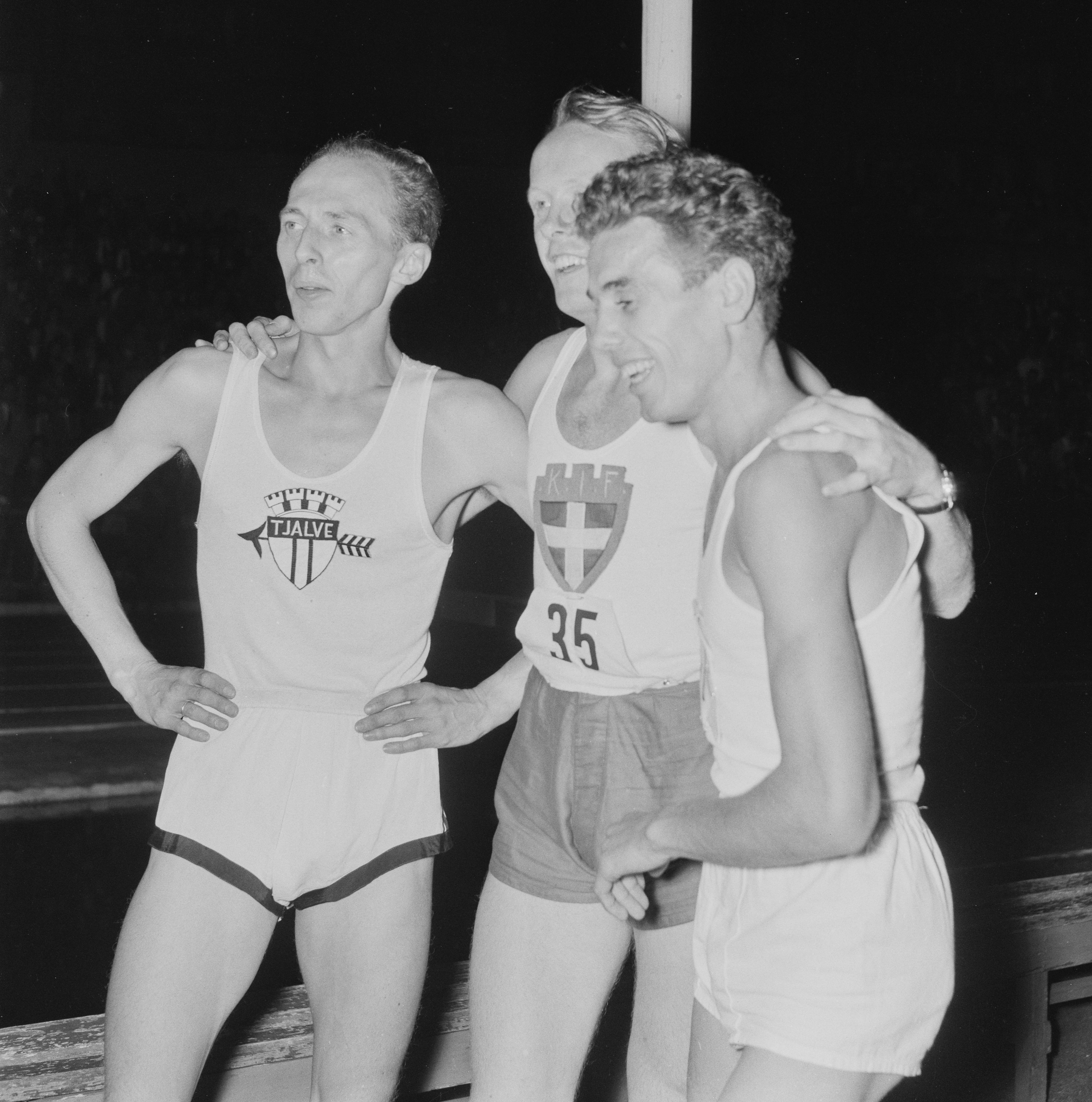
Audun Boysen, Gunnar Nielsen and László Tábori in Oslo, 1955

Nielsen participated in three major championships – two Olympic Games and one European Championships. He made his international breakthrough at the 1952 Summer Olympics in Helsinki, where he finished fourth in the 800 metres – finishing with exactly the same time, 1:49.7, as the bronze medal winner, Heinz Ulzheimer. At the 1954 European Championships in Bern, Nielsen set a new Danish record of 3:44.4 in the final of the 1500 metres, in which he finished second behind Roger Bannister.

Nielsen was Denmark's greatest male athlete during the 1950s and his ability to draw large crowds meant that he was much in demand by his country's promoters. His hectic schedule eventually took its toll on his health, and, with his times strongly affected by illness and exhaustion, Nielsen announced in September 1956 that he would retire after the 1956 Olympics in Melbourne. Though he won his 800 metres heat in a time of 1:51.2, Nielsen chose not to run the semi-final and instead chose to focus on the 1500 metres. In what proved to be the final race of his career, Nielsen finished the 1500 metres final in tenth place, over four seconds behind the winner, Ronnie Delany.

Following his athletic career Nielsen worked as a typographer for Det Berlingske Officin.

Records
Preceded by (United States) Mal Whitfield	Men's 880 yards World Record Holder; 30 September 1954 – 26 March 1955	Succeeded by (United States) Lonnie Spurrier
Preceded by (Australia) John Landy	Men's 1500 metres World Record Holder; 6 September 1955 – 3 August 1956	Succeeded by (Hungary) István Rózsavölgyi
