= Athletics at the 1955 Pan American Games – Men's 200 metres =

Men's 200 metres at the Pan American Games

The men's 200 metres event at the 1955 Pan American Games was held at the Estadio Universitario in Mexico City on 15 and 16 March.

== Medalists ==
Gold	Silver	Bronze
Rod Richard; United States	Charles Thomas; United States	José da Conceição; Brazil

== Results ==
=== Heats ===
Held on 15 March

Rank	Heat	Name	Nationality	Time	Notes
1	1	Charles Thomas	United States	22.64	Q
2	1	Eligio Rivas	Dominican Republic	22.97	Q
3	1	Juan Alberto Goya	Mexico	23.47	Q
1	2	José da Conceição	Brazil	21.35	Q
2	2	Tom Robinson	Bahamas	22.81	Q
3	2	Alexis Bloem	Netherlands Antilles	22.86	Q
	2	Harry Nelson	Canada	DQ	
1	3	Apolinar Solórzano	Venezuela	22.05	Q
2	3	Bruce Springbett	Canada	22.78	Q
3	3	Willie Williams	United States	22.80	Q
4	3	Domingo García	Dominican Republic	23.13	
1	4	Allan Moore	Jamaica	22.58	Q
2	4	José Tenreyro	Mexico	22.74	Q
3	4	José García	Venezuela	23.54	Q
	4	Rafael Fortún	Cuba	DNS	
1	5	Gerardo Bönnhoff	Argentina	21.75	Q
2	5	Rod Richard	United States	21.76	Q
3	5	Fitzroy Bates	Trinidad and Tobago	21.99	Q
4	5	Mel Spence	Jamaica	22.19	
1	6	Mike Agostini	Trinidad and Tobago	22.25	Q
2	6	Sergio Higuera	Mexico	22.40	Q
3	6	Dick Harding	Canada	22.41	Q
4	6	Luis Soriano	Dominican Republic	22.61	
5	6	Gilberto Fonseca	Netherlands Antilles	22.99	

=== Semifinals ===
Held on 15 March

Rank	Heat	Name	Nationality	Time	Notes
1	1	José da Conceição	Brazil	21.27	Q, GR
2	1	Charles Thomas	United States	21.75	Q
3	1	Eligio Rivas	Dominican Republic	22.43	
4	1	Juan Alberto Goya	Mexico	22.53	
5	1	Tom Robinson	Bahamas	22.74	
6	1	Alexis Bloem	Netherlands Antilles	22.87	
1	2	Fitzroy Bates	Trinidad and Tobago	21.6	Q
2	2	Bruce Springbett	Canada	21.9	Q
3	2	José Tenreyro	Mexico	22.0	
4	2	Allan Moore	Jamaica	22.2	
5	2	José García	Venezuela	??.?	
	2	Willie Williams	United States	DNS	
1	3	Rod Richard	United States	20.9	Q
2	3	Mike Agostini	Trinidad and Tobago	21.3	Q
3	3	Gerardo Bönnhoff	Argentina	21.3	
4	3	Apolinar Solórzano	Venezuela	21.4	
5	3	Dick Harding	Canada	21.8	
6	3	Sergio Higuera	Mexico	21.9	

=== Final ===
Held on 16 March

Rank	Lane	Name	Nationality	Time	Notes
1st place, gold medalist(s)	6	Rod Richard	United States	20.94	GR
2nd place, silver medalist(s)	4	Charles Thomas	United States	21.42	
3rd place, bronze medalist(s)	3	José da Conceição	Brazil	21.66	
4	2	Mike Agostini	Trinidad and Tobago	21.67	
5	5	Bruce Springbett	Canada	22.14	
	1	Fitzroy Bates	Trinidad and Tobago	DNF	
