= Athletics at the 1951 Pan American Games – Men's 200 metres =

Men's 200 metres at the Pan American Games

The men's 200 metres event at the 1951 Pan American Games was held at the Estadio Monumental in Buenos Aires on 1 and 2 March.

== Medalists ==
Gold	Silver	Bronze
Rafael Fortún; Cuba	Art Bragg; United States	Herb McKenley; Jamaica

== Results ==
=== Heats ===
Held on 1 March

Rank	Heat	Name	Nationality	Time	Notes
1	1	Art Bragg	United States	22.5	Q
2	1	Jesús Farres	Cuba	22.8	Q
3	1	José da Conceição	Brazil	23.1	Q
4	1	Miguel Paredes	Paraguay	23.7	
5	1	Germán Garrido	Venezuela	??.?	
1	2	Raúl Mazorra	Cuba	22.1	Q
2	2	José Zelaya	Paraguay	22.5	Q
3	2	Gustavo Ehlers	Chile	22.5	Q
4	2	Aristipo Lerma	Colombia	22.9	
	2	Hélio da Silva	Brazil	DNS	
1	3	Adelio Márquez	Argentina	23.3	Q
2	3	Leonel Contreras	Chile	23.3	Q
3	3	Juan Leiva	Venezuela	25.8	Q
	3	Jaime Aparicio	Colombia	DNS	
	3	Jacinto González	Ecuador	DNS	
1	4	Rafael Fortún	Cuba	23.6	Q
2	4	Fernando Lapuente	Argentina	23.7	Q
3	4	Gustavo Fajardo	Colombia	26.4	Q
	4	Gerardo Salazar	Peru	DNS	
1	5	Herb McKenley	Jamaica	22.8	Q
2	5	Antonio Moreira	Brazil	22.9	Q
3	5	Hamilton Bridgeman	Trinidad and Tobago	23.6	Q
4	5	Alfredo Rodas	Paraguay	24.2	
	5	Javier Souza	Mexico	DNS	
	5	Miguel León	Peru	DNS	
1	6	Don Campbell	United States	22.3	Q
2	6	Gerardo Bönnhoff	Argentina	22.3	Q
3	6	Andrés Fernández	Ecuador	23.0	Q
4	6	Hendrickson Harewood	Trinidad and Tobago	23.1	
	6	Oscar Maldonado	Peru	DNS	

=== Semifinals ===
Held on 2 March

Rank	Heat	Name	Nationality	Time	Notes
1	1	Art Bragg	United States	21.9	Q
2	1	Raúl Mazorra	Cuba	21.9	Q
3	1	José Zelaya	Paraguay	22.1	
4	1	Gustavo Ehlers	Chile	22.9	
5	1	Jesús Farres	Cuba	??.?	
6	1	José da Conceição	Brazil	??.?	
1	2	Rafael Fortún	Cuba	22.0	Q
2	2	Fernando Lapuente	Argentina	22.4	Q
3	2	Adelio Márquez	Argentina	22.4	
4	2	Juan Leiva	Venezuela	22.7	
5	2	Leonel Contreras	Chile	??.?	
6	2	Gustavo Fajardo	Colombia	??.?	
1	3	Herb McKenley	Jamaica	22.1	Q
2	3	Gerardo Bönnhoff	Argentina	22.1	Q
3	3	Don Campbell	United States	22.3	
4	3	Hamilton Bridgeman	Trinidad and Tobago	23.1	
	3	Antonio Moreira	Brazil	DNS	
	3	Andrés Fernández	Ecuador	DNS	

=== Final ===
Held on 2 March

Rank	Name	Nationality	Time	Notes
1st place, gold medalist(s)	Rafael Fortún	Cuba	21.3	
2nd place, silver medalist(s)	Art Bragg	United States	21.4	
3rd place, bronze medalist(s)	Herb McKenley	Jamaica	21.5	
4	Gerardo Bönnhoff	Argentina	21.9	
5	Raúl Mazorra	Cuba	??.?	
6	Fernando Lapuente	Argentina	??.?	
