= Athletics at the 1955 Pan American Games – Men's 4 × 100 metres relay =

Men's 4 × 100 metres relay at the Pan American Games

The men's 4 × 100 metres relay event at the 1955 Pan American Games was held at the Estadio Universitario in Mexico City on 19 March.

== Results ==
Rank	Nation	Athletes	Time	Notes
1st place, gold medalist(s)	United States	Willie Williams, John Bennett, Charles Thomas, Rod Richard	40.96	GR
2nd place, silver medalist(s)	Venezuela	Clive Bonas, Apolinar Solórzano, Guillermo Gutiérrez, Juan Leiva	41.36	
3rd place, bronze medalist(s)	Mexico	Alberto Goya, René Ahumada, Javier Souza, Sergio Higuera	41.94	
4	Argentina	Enrique Beckles, Raúl Zabala, Gerardo Bönnhoff, Eduardo Basilio Ríos	42.12	
5	Canada	Bruce Springbett, Dick Harding, Jack Smyth, Harry Nelson	42.24	
6	Dominican Republic	Luis Soriano, Rafael Castro, Eligio Rivas, Domingo García	42.64	
7	Cuba	Evaristo Iglesias, Angel García, Evelio Planas, Rafael Fortún	??.??	
