= Athletics at the 1955 Pan American Games – Men's 100 metres =

Men's 100 metres at the 1955 Pan American Games
- Venue: Estadio Universitario
- Dates: March 13 – March 14
- Competitors: 29 from 16 nations
- Winning time: 10.3

Medalists
Gold medal	Rod Richard	United States
Silver medal	Mike Agostini	Trinidad and Tobago
Bronze medal	Willie Williams	United States

The men's 100 metres event at the 1955 Pan American Games was held at the Estadio Universitario in Mexico City on 13 and 14 March.

== Results ==
=== Heats ===
Held on 13 March

==== Heat 1 ====
Rank	Athlete	Nation	Time	Notes
1	Dean Smith	United States	10.84	Q
2	Ciro Brazeiro	Uruguay	11.27	Q
3	Tom Robinson	Bahamas	11.32	Q
4	Alexis Bloem	Netherlands Antilles	11.44	

==== Heat 2 ====
Rank	Athlete	Nation	Time	Notes
1	Harry Nelson	Canada	10.88	Q
2	Rafael Fortún	Cuba	10.91	Q
3	Domingo García	Dominican Republic	11.20	Q
4	Javier Souza	Mexico	11.28	
5	Antonio Vanegas	Colombia	11.63	

==== Heat 3 ====
Rank	Athlete	Nation	Time	Notes
1	Willie Williams	United States	10.80	Q
2	René Ahumada	Mexico	10.91	Q
3	Apolinar Solórzano	Venezuela	11.07	Q
4	Franz Lara	Costa Rica	11.30	
	Eligio Rivas	Dominican Republic	DQ	

==== Heat 4 ====
Rank	Athlete	Nation	Time	Notes
1	Mike Agostini	Trinidad and Tobago	10.67	Q
2	Bruce Springbett	Canada	11.04	Q
3	Raúl Zabala	Argentina	11.21	Q
4	Carlos Vera	Chile	11.32	
5	José García	Venezuela	11.56	

==== Heat 5 ====
Rank	Athlete	Nation	Time	Notes
1	Rod Richard	United States	10.73	Q
2	Clive Bonas	Venezuela	10.86	Q
3	Keith Gardner	Jamaica	10.89	Q
4	Carlos Sierra	Colombia	11.61	
	Leonard Dames	Bahamas	DNS	

==== Heat 6 ====
Rank	Athlete	Nation	Time	Notes
1	José da Conceição	Brazil	11.06	Q
2	Luis Soriano	Dominican Republic	11.22	Q
3	Eduardo Basilio Ríos	Argentina	11.31	Q
4	Antonio Rodríguez	Mexico	11.53	
	Gilberto Fonseca	Netherlands Antilles	DQ	

=== Semifinals ===
Held on 14 March

==== Heat 1 ====
Rank	Athlete	Nation	Time	Notes
1	Dean Smith	United States	10.65	Q, GR
2	Rafael Fortún	Cuba	10.69	Q
3	Harry Nelson	Canada	10.87	
4	Domingo García	Dominican Republic	11.05	
5	Tom Robinson	Bahamas	11.26	
	Ciro Brazeiro	Uruguay	DNS	

==== Heat 2 ====
Rank	Athlete	Nation	Time	Notes
1	Willie Williams	United States	10.53	Q, GR
2	Mike Agostini	Trinidad and Tobago	10.54	Q
3	Apolinar Solórzano	Venezuela	11.02	
4	Bruce Springbett	Canada	11.10	
5	René Ahumada	Mexico	11.12	
6	Raúl Zabala	Argentina	11.53	

==== Heat 3 ====
Rank	Athlete	Nation	Time	Notes
1	Rod Richard	United States	10.44	Q, GR
2	Keith Gardner	Jamaica	10.63	Q
3	Clive Bonas	Venezuela	10.75	
4	José da Conceição	Brazil	10.76	
5	Eduardo Basilio Ríos	Argentina	11.05	
6	Luis Soriano	Dominican Republic	11.17	

=== Final ===
Held on 14 March

Rank	Name	Nationality	Time	Notes
1st place, gold medalist(s)	Rod Richard	United States	10.3	=GR
2nd place, silver medalist(s)	Mike Agostini	Trinidad and Tobago	10.4	
3rd place, bronze medalist(s)	Willie Williams	United States	10.4	
4	Keith Gardner	Jamaica	10.5	
5	Rafael Fortún	Cuba	10.6	
	Dean Smith	United States	DNF	
