= Athletics at the 1951 Pan American Games – Men's 100 metres =

Men's 100 metres at the 1951 Pan American Games
- Venue: Estadio Monumental
- Dates: October 27 – October 28
- Competitors: 30 from 13 nations
- Winning time: 10.6

Medalists
Gold medal	Rafael Fortún	Cuba
Silver medal	Art Bragg	United States
Bronze medal	Herb McKenley	Jamaica

The men's 100 metres event at the 1951 Pan American Games was held at the Estadio Monumental in Buenos Aires on 27 and 28 February.

== Results ==
=== Heats ===
Held on 27 February

==== Heat 1 ====
Rank	Athlete	Nation	Time	Notes
1	Gerardo Bönnhoff	Argentina	11.1	Q
2	Hélio da Silva	Brazil	11.1	Q
3	Hamilton Bridgeman	Trinidad and Tobago	11.2	Q
4	Miguel León	Peru	11.4	
5	Miguel Paredes	Paraguay	??.?	

==== Heat 2 ====
Rank	Athlete	Nation	Time	Notes
1	Art Bragg	United States	10.8	Q
2	Adelio Márquez	Argentina	11.1	Q
3	Hendrickson Harewood	Trinidad and Tobago	11.2	Q
4	Juan Leiva	Venezuela	11.3	
5	Alfaro Parra	Colombia	??.?	

==== Heat 3 ====
Rank	Athlete	Nation	Time	Notes
1	Jesús Farrés	Cuba	11.0	Q
2	Fernando Salinas	Chile	11.1	Q
3	Andrés Fernández	Ecuador	11.3	Q
4	Oscar Maldonado	Peru	11.3	
5	Alfredo Rodas	Paraguay	??.?	

==== Heat 4 ====
Rank	Athlete	Nation	Time	Notes
1	Don Campbell	United States	11.0	Q
2	Herb McKenley	Jamaica	11.0	Q
3	José da Conceição	Brazil	11.3	Q
4	Leonel Contreras	Chile	11.5	
5	Javier Souza	Mexico	??.?	

==== Heat 5 ====
Rank	Athlete	Nation	Time	Notes
1	José Zelaya	Paraguay	11.2	Q
2	Gerardo Salazar	Peru	11.2	Q
3	Raúl Mazorra	Cuba	11.4	Q
4	Rodolfo López	Chile	??.?	
5	Gustavo Fajardo	Colombia	??.?	

==== Heat 6 ====
Rank	Athlete	Nation	Time	Notes
1	Rafael Fortún	Cuba	11.1	Q
2	Aristipo Lerma	Colombia	11.1	Q
3	Enrique Beckles	Argentina	11.3	Q
4	Antonio Moreira	Brazil	??.?	
5	Germán Garrido	Venezuela	??.?	

=== Semifinals ===
Held on 28 February

==== Heat 1 ====
Rank	Athlete	Nation	Time	Notes
1	Art Bragg	United States	10.9	Q
2	Hélio da Silva	Brazil	11.1	Q
3	Gerardo Bönnhoff	Argentina	11.3	
4	Hendrickson Harewood	Trinidad and Tobago	11.4	
5	Adelio Márquez	Argentina	??.?	
–	Hamilton Bridgeman	Trinidad and Tobago	DQ	

==== Heat 2 ====
Rank	Athlete	Nation	Time	Notes
1	Fernando Salinas	Chile	10.9	Q
2	Herb McKenley	Jamaica	10.9	Q
3	Andrés Fernández	Ecuador	11.0	
4	Jesús Farrés	Cuba	11.1	
5	Don Campbell	United States	??.?	
6	José da Conceição	Brazil	??.?	

==== Heat 3 ====
Rank	Athlete	Nation	Time	Notes
1	Rafael Fortún	Cuba	11.0	Q
2	Gerardo Salazar	Peru	11.1	Q
3	Raúl Mazorra	Cuba	11.1	
4	Aristipo Lerma	Colombia	11.2	
5	Enrique Beckles	Argentina	??.?	
–	José Zelaya	Paraguay	DQ	

=== Final ===
Held on 28 February

Rank	Name	Nationality	Time	Notes
1st place, gold medalist(s)	Rafael Fortún	Cuba	10.6	
2nd place, silver medalist(s)	Art Bragg	United States	10.6	
3rd place, bronze medalist(s)	Herb McKenley	Jamaica	11.0	
4	Hélio da Silva	Brazil	11.0	
5	Fernando Salinas	Chile	11.1	
6	Gerardo Salazar	Peru	11.1	
