= Apolinar Solórzano =

Venezuelan sprinter (1934–2015)

Personal information
- Full name: Apolinar Solórzano Bustamante
- Nationality: Venezuelan
- Born: 23 July 1934
- Died: 2015 (aged 80–81)

Sport
- Sport: Sprinting
- Event: 200 metres

Apolinar Solórzano Bustamante (23 July 1934 – 2015) was a Venezuelan sprinter. He competed in the men's 200 metres at the 1956 Summer Olympics.

Solórzano won a bronze medal in the 4 x 100 m relay at the 1954 South American Championships in Athletics and two medals (silver and bronze) in both relays in athletics at the 1955 Pan American Games.

Solórzano is today described as a "legend of athletics". In 2010, Solórzano was inducted into the Venezuelan Athletics Federation Hall of Fame.

== International competitions ==
Year	Competition	Venue	Position	Event	Notes
Representing Venezuela
1954	Central American and Caribbean Games	Mexico City, Mexico	12th (sf)	100 m	11.1
1954	Central American and Caribbean Games	Mexico City, Mexico	6th (sf)	100 m	22.0
1954	Central American and Caribbean Games	Mexico City, Mexico	5th (h)	4 × 100 m relay	NT
1954	Central American and Caribbean Games	Mexico City, Mexico	5th	4 × 400 m relay	3:20.2
1954	South American Championships	São Paulo, Brazil	5th	200 m	21.9
1954	South American Championships	São Paulo, Brazil	3rd	4 × 100 m relay	42.2
1954	South American Championships	São Paulo, Brazil	3rd	4 × 400 m relay	3:21.0
1955	Pan American Games	Mexico City, Mexico	10th (sf)	100 m	11.02
1955	Pan American Games	Mexico City, Mexico	5th (sf)	200 m	21.4
1955	Pan American Games	Mexico City, Mexico	2nd	4 × 100 m relay	41.36
1955	Pan American Games	Mexico City, Mexico	3rd	4 × 400 m relay	3:15.93
1956	Olympic Games	Melbourne, Australia	– (h)	200 m	DQ
1956	Olympic Games	Melbourne, Australia	13th (h)	4 × 100 m relay	42.10
