= Angel García (sprinter) =

Cuban sprinter (1919–1996)

Angel García Delgado (10 October 1919 – 25 January 1996) was a Cuban sprinter who competed in the 1948 Summer Olympics. He finished second in the 1951 Pan American Games 4×100 metre relay (with Rafael Fortún, Raúl Mazorra, and Jesús Farrés). García also finished fifth in the 1951 Pan American Games 400 metres.

== International competitions ==
Year	Competition	Venue	Position	Event	Notes
Representing Cuba
1946	Central American and Caribbean Games	Barranquilla, Colombia	2nd	4 × 400 m relay	3:21.4
1948	Olympic Games	London, United Kingdom	45th (h)	100 m	11.25
1948	Olympic Games	London, United Kingdom	3rd (h)	200 m	22.2
1948	Olympic Games	London, United Kingdom	26th (h)	400 m	50.2
1950	Central American and Caribbean Games	Guatemala City, Guatemala	2nd (h)	400 m	49.3^{1}
1950	Central American and Caribbean Games	Guatemala City, Guatemala	2nd	4 × 400 m relay	3:19.0
1951	Pan American Games	Buenos Aires, Argentina	5th	400 m	48.4
1951	Pan American Games	Buenos Aires, Argentina	2nd	4 × 100 m relay	41.2
1951	Pan American Games	Buenos Aires, Argentina	4th	4 × 400 m relay	3:20.0
1952	Olympic Games	Helsinki, Finland	19th (qf)	200 m	22.11
1952	Olympic Games	Helsinki, Finland	36th (h)	400 m	49.34
1952	Olympic Games	Helsinki, Finland	8th (sf)	4 × 100 m relay	41.67
1954	Central American and Caribbean Games	Mexico City, Mexico	1st	400 m	48.02
1954	Central American and Caribbean Games	Mexico City, Mexico	3rd	4 × 400 m relay	3:17.83
1955	Pan American Games	Mexico City, Mexico	– (h)	400 m	DNF
1955	Pan American Games	Mexico City, Mexico	7th	4 × 100 m relay	NT

^{1}Did not finish in the final
