= Raúl Mazorra =

Cuban sprinter

Raúl Mazorra Zamorra (5 December 1928 – 7 January 2002) was a Cuban sprinter who competed in the 1948 Summer Olympics and in the 1952 Summer Olympics. He finished second in the 1951 Pan American Games 4×100 metres relay (with Rafael Fortún, Angel García, and the non-Olympian Jesús Farrés). Mazorra also finished fifth in the 1951 Pan American Games 200 metres.

== Competition record ==
Year	Competition	Venue	Position	Event	Notes
Representing Cuba
1948	Olympic Games	London, United Kingdom	35th (h)	100 m	11.14
1948	Olympic Games	London, United Kingdom	3rd (h)	200 m	23.0
1950	Central American and Caribbean Games	Guatemala City, Guatemala	1st	4 × 100 m relay	41.5
1951	Pan American Games	Buenos Aires, Argentina	7th (sf)	100 m	11.1
1951	Pan American Games	Buenos Aires, Argentina	5th	200 m	NT
1951	Pan American Games	Buenos Aires, Argentina	2nd	4 × 100 m relay	41.2
1951	Pan American Games	Buenos Aires, Argentina	4th	4 × 400 m relay	3:20.0
1952	Olympic Games	Helsinki, Finland	34th (h)	100 m	11.19
1952	Olympic Games	Helsinki, Finland	24th (qf)	200 m	31.00
1954	Central American and Caribbean Games	Mexico City, Mexico	3rd	100 m	10.80
1954	Central American and Caribbean Games	Mexico City, Mexico	4th	200 m	22.0
1954	Central American and Caribbean Games	Mexico City, Mexico	2nd	4 × 100 m relay	41.56
