= Guillermo Gutiérrez (athlete) =

Venezuelan sprinter (born 1927)

Personal information
- Full name: Guillermo Gutiérrez Báez
- Nationality: Venezuelan
- Born: 3 May 1927

Sport
- Sport: Sprinting
- Event: 100 metres

Guillermo Gutiérrez Báez (born 3 May 1927) is a Venezuelan sprinter. He competed in the men's 100 metres at the 1952 Summer Olympics.

== International competitions ==
Year	Competition	Venue	Position	Event	Notes
Representing Venezuela
1951	Pan American Games	Buenos Aires, Argentina	13th (h)	400 m	51.2
1951	Bolivarian Games	Caracas, Venezuela	2nd	400 m	48.4
1951	Bolivarian Games	Caracas, Venezuela	2nd	4 × 400 m relay	3:23.1
1952	Olympic Games	Helsinki, Finland	56th (h)	100 m	11.42
1952	Olympic Games	Helsinki, Finland	15th (qf)	400 m	48.75
1954	Central American and Caribbean Games	Mexico City, Mexico	8th (sf)	400 m	49.6
1954	Central American and Caribbean Games	Mexico City, Mexico	5th (h)	4 × 100 m relay	NT
1954	Central American and Caribbean Games	Mexico City, Mexico	5th	4 × 400 m relay	3:20.2
1954	South American Championships	São Paulo, Brazil	9th (sf)	200 m	22.4
1954	South American Championships	São Paulo, Brazil	3rd	4 × 100 m relay	42.2
1954	South American Championships	São Paulo, Brazil	3rd	4 × 400 m relay	3:21.0
1955	Pan American Games	Mexico City, Mexico	11th (sf)	400 m	48.61
1955	Pan American Games	Mexico City, Mexico	2nd	4 × 100 m relay	41.36
1955	Pan American Games	Mexico City, Mexico	3rd	4 × 400 m relay	3:15.93

== Personal bests ==
- 400 metres – 48.31 (1955)
