= Athletics at the 1954 Central American and Caribbean Games – Results =

These are the results of the athletics competition at the 1954 Central American and Caribbean Games which took place between 7 and 12 March 1954, at the Estadio Olímpico Universitario in Mexico City, Mexico.

== Men's results ==
=== 100 metres ===
Heats – 7 March

Rank	Heat	Name	Nationality	Time	Notes
1	1	Les Laing	Jamaica	10.9	Q
2	1	José Manuel Abascal	Mexico	11.0	Q
3	1	José Luis Ubarri	Puerto Rico	11.1	Q
4	1	Guillermo Elis	Guatemala	11.2	
1	2	Gilberto Rondón	Puerto Rico	10.9	Q
2	2	Sergio Higuera	Mexico	11.0	Q
3	2	Aristipo Lerma	Colombia	11.1	Q
4	2	Mario Feusier	El Salvador	11.3	
5	2	Ricardo Lenhoff	Guatemala	11.3	
1	3	Raúl Mazorra	Cuba	10.7	Q
2	3	Keith Gardner	Jamaica	11.0	Q
3	3	Seymore Lashley	Panama	11.2	Q
4	3	Alfaro Parra	Colombia	11.3	
1	4	Byron LaBeach	Jamaica	10.7	Q
2	4	Apolinar Solórzano	Venezuela	10.9	Q
3	4	Martín Francis	Panama	11.0	Q
4	4	Israel Mestre	Cuba	11.2	
5	4	Félix Taurino	Dominican Republic	11.4	
1	5	Rafael Fortún	Cuba	11.0	Q
2	5	Alfredo Grennion	Panama	11.0	Q
3	5	Domingo García	Dominican Republic	11.2	Q
1	6	Manuel Rivera	Puerto Rico	11.1	Q
2	6	Javier Souza	Mexico	11.2	Q
3	6	Luis Soriano	Dominican Republic	11.6	Q
4	6	Luis Logan	Guatemala	11.7	

Semifinals – 7 March

Rank	Heat	Name	Nationality	Time	Notes
1	1	Raúl Mazorra	Cuba	10.4 (10.80)	Q
2	1	Alfredo Grennion	Panama	10.7	Q
3	1	Keith Gardner	Jamaica	10.8	
4	1	Sergio Higuera	Mexico	11.0	
5	1	José Luis Ubarri	Puerto Rico	11.1	
6	1	Domingo García	Dominican Republic	11.1	
1	2	Byron LaBeach	Jamaica	10.6	Q
2	2	Aristipo Lerma	Colombia	10.8	Q
3	2	Javier Souza	Mexico	10.9	
4	2	Apolinar Solórzano	Venezuela	11.1	
5	2	Martín Francis	Panama	11.1	
6	2	Manuel Rivera	Puerto Rico	11.2	
1	3	Rafael Fortún	Cuba	10.6	Q
2	3	Les Laing	Jamaica	10.7	Q
3	3	Gilberto Rondón	Puerto Rico	10.8	
4	3	José Manuel Abascal	Mexico	11.0	
5	3	Seymore Lashley	Panama	11.1	
6	3	Luis Soriano	Dominican Republic	11.2	

Final – 8 March

Rank	Lane	Name	Nationality	Time	Notes
1st place, gold medalist(s)	1	Rafael Fortún	Cuba	10.5 (10.58)	
2nd place, silver medalist(s)	2	Les Laing	Jamaica	10.5 (10.66)	
3rd place, bronze medalist(s)	5	Raúl Mazorra	Cuba	10.7 (10.80)	
4	4	Byron LaBeach	Jamaica	10.8	
5	3	Alfredo Grennion	Panama	10.8	
6	6	Aristipo Lerma	Colombia	10.9	

=== 200 metres ===
Heats – 9 March

Rank	Heat	Name	Nationality	Time	Notes
1	1	Manuel Rivera	Puerto Rico	22.2	Q
2	1	Javier de la Torre	Mexico	22.4	Q
3	1	Aristipo Lerma	Colombia	22.6	Q
4	1	Ernesto Berger	Guatemala	23.2	
1	2	Les Laing	Jamaica	22.0	Q
2	2	Jaime Aparicio	Colombia	22.1	Q
3	2	José Manuel Abascal	Mexico	22.5	Q
4	2	Mario Feusier	El Salvador	23.0	
1	3	Ismael Delgado	Puerto Rico	22.6	Q
2	3	Alfredo Grennion	Panama	22.9	Q
3	3	Alfaro Parra	Colombia	24.0	Q
1	4	Raúl Mazorra	Cuba	21.7	Q
2	4	Martín Francis	Panama	21.9	Q
3	4	Apolinar Solórzano	Venezuela	22.5	Q
1	5	Byron LaBeach	Jamaica	22.1	Q
2	5	Manuel Peñalver	Cuba	22.2	Q
3	5	Seymore Lashley	Panama	22.7	Q
4	5	Luis Soriano	Dominican Republic	23.1	
1	6	Félix Taurino	Dominican Republic	22.2	Q
2	6	Sergio Higuera	Mexico	22.7	Q
3	6	José Luis Ubarri	Puerto Rico	22.8	Q
4	6	Julio Barillas	Guatemala	23.6	

Semifinals – 9 March

Rank	Heat	Name	Nationality	Time	Notes
1	1	Raúl Mazorra	Cuba	21.7	Q
2	1	Félix Taurino	Dominican Republic	22.0	Q
3	1	Manuel Rivera	Puerto Rico	22.1	
4	1	Sergio Higuera	Mexico	22.2	
5	1	Seymore Lashley	Panama	22.4	
6	1	Alfaro Parra	Colombia	22.8	
1	2	Martín Francis	Panama	21.7	Q
2	2	Byron LaBeach	Jamaica	21.7	Q
3	2	Manuel Peñalver	Cuba	22.0	
4	2	José Luis Ubarri	Puerto Rico	22.1	
5	2	José Manuel Abascal	Mexico	22.4	
6	2	Aristipo Lerma	Colombia	22.4	
1	3	Les Laing	Jamaica	21.4	Q
2	3	Jaime Aparicio	Colombia	21.4	Q
3	3	Apolinar Solórzano	Venezuela	22.0	
4	3	Ismael Delgado	Puerto Rico	22.0	
5	3	Alfredo Grennion	Panama	22.2	
6	3	Javier de la Torre	Mexico	22.4	

Final – 10 March

Rank	Lane	Name	Nationality	Time	Notes
1st place, gold medalist(s)	2	Les Laing	Jamaica	21.2 (21.66)	
2nd place, silver medalist(s)	4	Jaime Aparicio	Colombia	21.6 (21.84)	
3rd place, bronze medalist(s)	6	Martín Francis	Panama	21.6 (21.90)	
4	5	Raúl Mazorra	Cuba	22.0	
5	1	Byron LaBeach	Jamaica	22.2	
6	3	Félix Taurino	Dominican Republic	22.4	

=== 400 metres ===
Heats – 9 March

Rank	Heat	Name	Nationality	Time	Notes
1	1	George Rhoden	Jamaica	49.2	Q
2	1	Angel García	Cuba	49.9	Q
3	1	Frank Rivera	Puerto Rico	51.3	Q
4	1	Rafael Laerte	Dominican Republic	53.6	
1	2	Juan Goya	Mexico	49.9	Q
2	2	Evelio Planas	Cuba	50.3	Q
3	2	Cirilo McSween	Panama	53.2	Q
4	2	Wilfredo Stokes	Guatemala	54.0	
1	3	Louis Gooden	Jamaica	50.3	Q
2	3	José Felipe Chara	Colombia	51.0	Q
3	3	Javier Souza	Mexico	51.4	Q
4	3	José Hiraldo	Puerto Rico	1:04.3	
1	4	Pablo Salinas	Mexico	53.1	Q
2	4	Alfredo Richards	Panama	54.0	Q
	4	Jaime Aparicio	Colombia	DNS	
	4	Julio Barillas	Guatemala	DNS	
1	5	Guillermo Gutiérrez	Venezuela	49.6	Q
2	5	Ovidio de Jesús	Puerto Rico	50.0	Q
3	5	Armando Vázquez	Cuba	50.6	Q
4	5	Euclides Melo	Colombia	50.9	
5	5	Valentino Castillo	Guatemala	52.9	

Semifinals – 10 March

Rank	Heat	Name	Nationality	Time	Notes
1	1	George Rhoden	Jamaica	48.4	Q
2	1	Frank Rivera	Puerto Rico	48.9	Q
3	1	Evelio Planas	Cuba	49.1	
4	1	Pablo Salinas	Mexico	50.3	
5	1	José Felipe Chara	Colombia	52.5	
1	2	Ovidio de Jesús	Puerto Rico	49.0	Q
2	2	Javier Souza	Mexico	49.4	Q
3	2	Guillermo Gutiérrez	Venezuela	49.6	
4	2	Cirilo McSween	Panama	50.4	
5	2	Armando Vázquez	Cuba	51.2	
1	3	Louis Gooden	Jamaica	48.8	Q
2	3	Angel García	Cuba	49.1	Q
3	3	Juan Goya	Mexico	50.0	
4	3	Alfredo Richards	Panama	53.1	

Final – 11 March

Rank	Lane	Name	Nationality	Time	Notes
1st place, gold medalist(s)	4	Angel García	Cuba	47.9 (48.02)	
2nd place, silver medalist(s)	3	George Rhoden	Jamaica	47.9 (48.19)	
3rd place, bronze medalist(s)	6	Ovidio de Jesús	Puerto Rico	48.3 (48.27)	
4	7	Louis Gooden	Jamaica	48.3 (48.44)	
5	2	Frank Rivera	Puerto Rico	48.6	
6	5	Javier Souza	Mexico	49.0	

=== 800 metres ===
Heats – 7 March

Rank	Heat	Name	Nationality	Time	Notes
1	1	Frank Prince	Panama	1:58.4	Q
2	1	Louis Gooden	Jamaica	1:58.9	Q
3	1	René García	Cuba	2:00.8	Q
4	1	Frank Rivera	Puerto Rico	2:01.1	Q
5	1	Herminio Crespo	Cuba	2:01.7	
6	1	Alfredo Nevares	Mexico	2:01.8	
7	1	Ernesto Torres	Puerto Rico	2:02.5	
	1	Adalberto Ortega	Mexico	?	
	1	Filemón Camacho	Venezuela	?	
1	2	George Rhoden	Jamaica	1:59.5	Q
2	2	Evelio Planas	Cuba	1:59.8	Q
3	2	Eric Waldrom	Panama	2:00.0	Q
4	2	Samuel Alvarado	Mexico	2:00.0	Q
5	2	Francisco Miranda	Dominican Republic	2:00.3	
6	2	Carlos Cambindo	Colombia	2:00.4	
7	2	Samuel Maduro	Puerto Rico	NT	

Final – 8 March

Rank	Name	Nationality	Time	Notes
1st place, gold medalist(s)	Frank Prince	Panama	1:54.4 (1:54.47)	GR
2nd place, silver medalist(s)	George Rhoden	Jamaica	1:54.9 (1:55.00)	
3rd place, bronze medalist(s)	Eric Waldrom	Panama	1:57.6 (1:57.74)	
4	Frank Rivera	Puerto Rico	1:57.7	
5	Louis Gooden	Jamaica	2:00.7	
6	Samuel Alvarado	Mexico	2:00.9	
	René García	Cuba	?	
	Evelio Planas	Cuba	DNF	

=== 1500 metres ===
Heats – 10 March

Rank	Heat	Name	Nationality	Time	Notes
1	1	Frank Prince	Panama	4:20.9	Q
2	1	Heliodoro Martínez	Mexico	4:21.1	Q
3	1	Baron Duncan	Jamaica	4:21.5	Q
4	1	Victorio Skerett	Puerto Rico	4:21.6	Q
5	1	Hernando Ruiz	Colombia	4:21.8	Q
6	1	Francisco Miranda	Dominican Republic	4:24.0	
	1	René García	Cuba	?	
	1	Rosendo Brunet	Cuba	?	
	1	Augusto Robles	Guatemala	?	
10	1	Ángel Dennis	Puerto Rico	?	
1	2	Filemón Camacho	Venezuela	4:22.0	Q
2	2	Víctorio Solares	Guatemala	4:22.4	Q
3	2	Carlos Cambindo	Colombia	4:22.8	Q
4	2	Raúl Osorio	Mexico	4:23.2	Q
5	2	Germán Lozano	Colombia	4:23.6	Q
6	2	Ramiro García	Cuba	4:24.4	
	2	Eric Waldrom	Panama	?	
	2	Rosendo Guzmán	Mexico	?	
8	2	Wilebaldo Ojeda	Puerto Rico	?	

Final – 11 March

Rank	Name	Nationality	Time	Notes
1st place, gold medalist(s)	Frank Prince	Panama	4:16.4 (4:16.65)	
2nd place, silver medalist(s)	Heliodoro Martínez	Mexico	4:16.5 (4:16.81)	
3rd place, bronze medalist(s)	Filemón Camacho	Venezuela	4:17.5 (4:17.71)	
4	Baron Duncan	Jamaica	4:19.0	
5	Raúl Osorio	Mexico	4:19.3	
6	Victorio Skerett	Puerto Rico	4:19.9	
	Hernando Ruiz	Colombia	?	
	Víctorio Solares	Guatemala	?	
	Carlos Cambindo	Colombia	?	
	Germán Lozano	Colombia	?	

=== 5000 metres ===
9 March

Rank	Name	Nationality	Time	Notes
1st place, gold medalist(s)	Mateo Flores	Guatemala	15:57.0 (15:57.30)	
2nd place, silver medalist(s)	Eligio Galicia	Mexico	16:04.0 (16:04.52)	
3rd place, bronze medalist(s)	Francisco Hernández	Mexico	16:04.4 (16:07.04)	
4	Guillermo Rojas	Guatemala	16:26.6	
5	Juan Villagrán	Guatemala	17:07.2	
6	Hernando Ruiz	Colombia	18:01.0	
9	Rodolfo Méndez	Puerto Rico	?	
	Baron Duncan	Jamaica	?	
	Faustino López	Panama	?	
	Emérito Estrella	Dominican Republic	?	
	Pablo de la Mota	Dominican Republic	?	
	Pedro Xolalpa	Mexico	?	

=== 10,000 metres ===
7 March

Rank	Name	Nationality	Time	Notes
1st place, gold medalist(s)	Cruz Serrano	Mexico	32:59.4 (32:59.63)	GR
2nd place, silver medalist(s)	Mateo Flores	Guatemala	33:52.6 (33:52.80)	
3rd place, bronze medalist(s)	Francisco Hernández	Mexico	34:00.4 (34:00.19)	
4	Juan Moreno	Mexico	34:08.0	
5	Gustavo Ramírez	Colombia	35:29.0	
6	Julio Chavarria	Colombia	35:30.0	
	Guillermo Rojas	Guatemala	?	
	Juan Villagrán	Guatemala	?	
	Pedro Torres	El Salvador	?	
	Rafael Flores	El Salvador	?	
	Faustino López	Panama	?	
	Emérito Estrella	Dominican Republic	?	
	Pablo de la Mota	Dominican Republic	?	
12	Carlos Quiñónez	Puerto Rico	?	

=== Half marathon ===
12 March – 21,097.5 km

Rank	Name	Nationality	Time	Notes
1st place, gold medalist(s)	Mateo Flores	Guatemala	1:15:20	
2nd place, silver medalist(s)	Gustavo Ramírez	Colombia	1:19:00	
3rd place, bronze medalist(s)	Guillermo Rojas	Guatemala	1:19:01	
4	Juan Villagrán	Guatemala	1:20:17	
5	Francisco Vega	Mexico	1:20:59	
6	Julio Chavarria	Colombia	1:21:21	
	Rafael Flores	El Salvador	?	
	Onésimo Rodríguez	Mexico	?	
	Pedro Torres	El Salvador	?	
	Pedro Peralta	Mexico	?	
11	Rodolfo Méndez	Puerto Rico	?	
12	Carlos Quiñónez	Puerto Rico	?	

=== 110 metres hurdles ===
Heats – 9 March

Rank	Heat	Name	Nationality	Time	Notes
1	1	Samuel Anderson	Cuba	14.6	Q
2	1	Juan Leiva	Venezuela	15.2	Q
3	1	Carlos Ávila	Colombia	15.6	
4	1	Américo Villareal	Mexico	16.2	
1	2	Evaristo Iglesias	Cuba	14.5	Q, GR
2	2	Keith Gardner	Jamaica	15.0	Q
3	2	Félix Bello	Puerto Rico	15.5	
1	3	Teófilo Davis Bell	Venezuela	15.0	Q
2	3	Julio Sabater	Puerto Rico	15.5	Q
3	3	Víctor González	Panama	15.9	
4	3	José Elías Anderson	Cuba	16.3	

Final – 10 March

Rank	Lane	Name	Nationality	Time	Notes
1st place, gold medalist(s)	2	Samuel Anderson	Cuba	14.3	GR
2nd place, silver medalist(s)	3	Keith Gardner	Jamaica	14.5	
3rd place, bronze medalist(s)	6	Teófilo Davis Bell	Venezuela	15.2	
4	4	Evaristo Iglesias	Cuba	15.2	
5	7	Juan Leiva	Venezuela	15.2	
6	5	Julio Sabater	Puerto Rico	15.4	

=== 400 metres hurdles ===
Heats – 7 March

Rank	Heat	Name	Nationality	Time	Notes
1	1	Jaime Aparicio	Colombia	55.9	Q
2	1	Eugenio Rojas	Puerto Rico	56.5	Q
3	1	José Elías Anderson	Cuba	56.9	
4	1	Guillermo Popoca	Mexico	58.1	
5	1	Víctor González	Panama	?	
1	2	Amadeo Francis	Puerto Rico	54.6	Q
2	2	Juan Leiva	Venezuela	54.7	Q
3	2	Evaristo Iglesias	Cuba	58.5	
4	2	Simón Nava	Mexico	59.0	
1	3	Ovidio de Jesús	Puerto Rico	54.7	Q
2	3	Emilio Pestana	Cuba	56.4	Q
3	3	Óscar Galindo	Mexico	57.1	
4	3	Euclides Melo	Colombia	57.4	

Final – 8 March

Rank	Lane	Name	Nationality	Time	Notes
1st place, gold medalist(s)	4	Jaime Aparicio	Colombia	53.3 (53.35)	GR
2nd place, silver medalist(s)	2	Juan Leiva	Venezuela	53.6 (53.98)	
3rd place, bronze medalist(s)	3	Amadeo Francis	Puerto Rico	54.3 (54.28)	
4	6	Ovidio de Jesús	Puerto Rico	54.5	
5	1	Emilio Pestana	Cuba	57.5	
6	5	Eugenio Rojas	Puerto Rico	58.0	

=== 3000 metres steeplechase ===
8 March

Rank	Name	Nationality	Time	Notes
1st place, gold medalist(s)	Eligio Galicia	Mexico	10:22.4 (10:22.38)	GR
2nd place, silver medalist(s)	Víctorio Solares	Guatemala	10:51.4 (10:51.49)	
3rd place, bronze medalist(s)	José Grenados	Mexico	11:00.1 (11:00.80)	
4	Catarino Jiménez	Mexico	11:04.4	
5	Augusto Robles	Guatemala	11:52.4	
6	Wilebaldo Ojeda	Puerto Rico	12:40.5	
	Rodolfo Méndez	Puerto Rico	DNF	

=== 4 × 100 metres relay ===
Heats – 11 March

Rank	Heat	Nation	Competitors	Time	Notes
1	1	Puerto Rico	Guillermo Torraca, Manuel Rivera, José Luis Ubarri, Guillermo Rondón	42.6	Q
2	1	Cuba	Israel Mestre, Raúl Mazorra, Manuel Peñalver, Rafael Fortún	42.8	Q
3	1	Guatemala	Ricardo Lenhoff, Ernesto Berger, Roy Fearon, Julio Barillas	43.6	Q
4	1	Dominican Republic	Luis Soriano, Rafael Laerte, Félix Taurino, Domingo García	44.1	
5	1	Venezuela	Apolinar Solórzano, Teófilo Davis Bell, Juan Leiva, Guillermo Gutiérrez	NT	
1	2	Panama	Martín Francis, Alfredo Grennion, Alfredo Richards, Cirilo McSween	41.4	Q
2	2	Jamaica	Byron LaBeach, George Rhoden, Keith Gardner, Leslie Laing	41.7	Q
3	2	Mexico	Javier de la Torre, José Manuel Abascal, Javier Souza, Sergio Higuera	42.0	Q
4	2	Colombia	Aristipo Lerma, Alberto Lemos, Alfaro Parra, Jaime Aparicio	NT	

Final – 12 March

Rank	Lane	Nation	Competitors	Time	Notes
1st place, gold medalist(s)	3	Jamaica	Byron LaBeach, George Rhoden, Keith Gardner, Leslie Laing	40.9 (41.06)	GR
2nd place, silver medalist(s)	4	Cuba	Israel Mestre, Raúl Mazorra, Manuel Peñalver, Rafael Fortún	41.3 (41.56)	
3rd place, bronze medalist(s)	5	Mexico	Javier de la Torre, José Manuel Abascal, Javier Souza, Sergio Higuera	41.9 (42.04)	
4	1	Panama	Martín Francis, Alfredo Grennion, Alfredo Richards, Cirilo McSween	41.9	
5	2	Puerto Rico	Guillermo Torraca, Manuel Rivera, José Luis Ubarri, Guillermo Rondón	42.0	
6	6	Guatemala	Ricardo Lenhoff, Ernesto Berger, Roy Fearon, Julio Barillas	42.8	

=== 4 × 400 metres relay ===
12 March

Rank	Lane	Nation	Competitors	Time	Notes
1st place, gold medalist(s)	3	Jamaica	Leslie Laing, Byron LaBeach, Keith Gardner, George Rhoden	3:12.0 (3:12.25)	GR
2nd place, silver medalist(s)	5	Puerto Rico	Amadeo Francis, Ismael Delgado, Frank Rivera, Ovidio de Jesús	3:17.4 (3:17.70)	
3rd place, bronze medalist(s)	7	Cuba	Ángel García, Evelio Planas, Armando Vázquez, Emilio Pestana	3:17.7 (3:17.83)	
4	2	Mexico	Pablo Salinas, Gilberto Trejo, Juan Goya, Javier Souza	3:18.7	
5	1	Venezuela	Apolinar Solórzano, Filemón Camacho, Juan Leiva, Guillermo Gutiérrez	3:20.2	
6	4	Colombia	Aristipo Lerma, José Felipe Chara, Hernando Ruiz, Jaime Aparicio	3:26.0	

=== High jump ===
7 March

Rank	Name	Nationality	1.70	1.75	1.80	1.82	1.85	1.87	Result	Notes
1st place, gold medalist(s)	Roberto López	Cuba	o	o	o	o	o	o	1.87	
2nd place, silver medalist(s)	Gaspar Vigo	Puerto Rico	xo	xo	o	xo	xo	xxo	1.87	
3rd place, bronze medalist(s)	Manuel Gómez	Venezuela	–	o	o	xo	xo	xxx	1.85	
4	José Valero Prieto	Cuba	o	o	o	xo	xxo	xxx	1.85	
5	Juan Manuel Dávila	Mexico	xo	o	o	xxx			1.80	
6	Eladio Martínez	Venezuela	–	xo	xo	xxx			1.80	
7	Teófilo Ruiz	Venezuela	–	o	xxx				1.75	
8	Ismael Llanos	Puerto Rico	o	o	xxx				1.75	
8	Víctor Carmona	Puerto Rico	o	o	xxx				1.75	
10	Alfredo Creque	Dominican Republic	o	xo	xxx				1.75	
11	Valentino Castillo	Guatemala	xo	xo	xxx				1.75	

=== Pole vault ===
9 March

Rank	Name	Nationality	3.15	3.30	3.45	3.55	3.65	3.75	3.90	4.05	Result	Notes
1st place, gold medalist(s)	José Barbosa	Puerto Rico	–	–	–	o	o	o	o	xo	4.05	
2nd place, silver medalist(s)	Jorge Aguilera	Mexico	–	–	–	–	xo	o	o	xxx	3.90	
3rd place, bronze medalist(s)	Brígido Iriarte	Venezuela	–	–	xo	xo	xo	xxo	o	xxx	3.90	
4	José Vicente Chandler	Puerto Rico	–	–	o	o	o	xxx			3.75	
5	Ángel Nerváez	Puerto Rico	–	xo	o	o	o	xxx			3.75	
6	Carlos Ávila	Colombia	xo	–	o	xxx					3.45	

=== Long jump ===
8 March

Rank	Name	Nationality	#1	#2	#3	#4	#5	#6	Result	Notes
1st place, gold medalist(s)	Claudio Cabrejas	Cuba	7.12	7.46	6.93	6.78	6.96	7.27	7.46	GR
2nd place, silver medalist(s)	Víctor Hernández	Cuba	6.75	7.16	x	6.92	x	7.07	7.16	
3rd place, bronze medalist(s)	Keith Gardner	Jamaica	6.08	x	6.76	6.34	7.02	x	7.02	
4	Gilberto Rondón	Puerto Rico	x	6.53	6.98	5.22	6.45	x	6.98	
5	Asnoldo Devonish	Venezuela	6.90	6.87	–	x	–	–	6.90	
6	Francisco Castro	Puerto Rico	6.84	6.50	6.47	6.44	6.41	–	6.84	
7	Alberto Lemus	Colombia	6.68	6.71	6.45				6.71	
8	Héctor Román	Puerto Rico	x	x	6.66				6.66	
9	Jorge Aguirre	Mexico	6.53	6.31	6.30				6.53	
10	Roberto López	Cuba	6.34	6.52	6.25				6.52	
11	Alfaro Parra	Colombia	x	x	6.41				6.41	
12	Álvaro Gutiérrez	Colombia	6.19	6.06	6.39				6.39	
13	Roy Fearon	Guatemala	6.08	6.27	6.07				6.27	

=== Triple jump ===
10 March

Rank	Name	Nationality	#1	#2	#3	#4	#5	#6	Result	Notes
1st place, gold medalist(s)	Víctor Hernández	Cuba	14.02	x	14.65	14.86	14.46	14.76	14.86	GR
2nd place, silver medalist(s)	Claudio Cabrejas	Cuba	14.17	14.51	13.75	13.90	14.05	14.34	14.51	
3rd place, bronze medalist(s)	Gilberto Rondón	Puerto Rico	13.95	13.93	14.15	13.82	14.18	–	14.18	
4	Álvaro Gutiérrez	Colombia	14.08	14.13	14.12	13.56	x	13.12	14.13	
5	Francisco Dávila	Mexico	14.10	13.88	13.70	x	x	x	14.10	
6	Jorge Aguirre	Mexico	14.00	13.85	13.49	13.91	13.50	13.76	14.00	
7	Héctor Román	Puerto Rico	x	x	13.80				13.80	
8	Roy Fearon	Guatemala	13.77	13.27	x				13.77	
9	Francisco Castro	Puerto Rico	x	x	13.74				13.74	
10	Alberto Lemus	Colombia	13.21	13.46	12.33				13.46	
11	Carlos Ávila	Colombia	13.00	13.17	12.16				13.17	
12	Juan Manuel Dávila	Mexico	12.99	13.08	12.89				13.08	
13	Asnoldo Devonish	Venezuela	x	x	12.97				12.97	
14	Brígido Iriarte	Venezuela	x	12.80					12.80	

=== Shot put ===
8 March

Rank	Name	Nationality	#1	#2	#3	#4	#5	#6	Result	Notes
1st place, gold medalist(s)	Ramón Rosario	Puerto Rico	13.74	13.92	14.12	14.08	14.29	14.46	14.46	GR
2nd place, silver medalist(s)	Eduardo Adriana	Netherlands Antilles	x	13.90	14.34	14.45	13.43	13.51	14.45	
3rd place, bronze medalist(s)	Rafael Trompiz	Venezuela	14.38	13.82	13.68	13.17	13.60	13.30	14.38	
4	Harold Saladin	Venezuela	13.21	12.81	13.58	13.98	13.47	x	13.98	
5	Gerardo Devilliers	Cuba	13.26	13.48	13.34	13.47	13.85	13.45	13.85	
6	Israél Capacete	Puerto Rico	12.29	13.36	12.73	12.50	11.95	13.45	13.45	
7	Rodolfo Sedas	Mexico	12.68	13.26	x				13.26	
8	Luis Betancourt	Cuba	12.05	12.75	12.63				12.75	
9	Mauricio Rodríguez	Venezuela	12.16	11.85	12.15				12.16	
10	Julio Noltenius	El Salvador	10.82	11.56	12.03				12.03	
11	Alfonso Cruz	Mexico	11.29	11.16	11.05				11.29	

=== Discus throw ===
9 March

Rank	Name	Nationality	#1	#2	#3	#4	#5	#6	Result	Notes
1st place, gold medalist(s)	Mauricio Rodríguez	Venezuela	40.03	37.65	38.02	39.73	39.76	40.14	40.14	
2nd place, silver medalist(s)	Alfonso Cruz	Mexico	32.19	37.50	39.00	37.38	39.92	35.57	39.00	
3rd place, bronze medalist(s)	Heriberto Alonso	Cuba	37.53	x	37.22	35.63	38.11	38.87	38.87	
4	Brígido Iriarte	Venezuela	38.67	x	38.69	36.27	37.28	36.64	38.69	
5	Ramón Rosario	Puerto Rico	36.12	36.55	37.95	36.52	38.60	38.62	38.62	
6	Roberto de la Maza	Cuba	38.11	31.61	35.04	x	38.41	x	38.41	
7	Harold Saladin	Venezuela	37.00	33.14	33.66				37.00	
8	Manuel Seoane	Puerto Rico	34.88	35.90	34.69				35.90	
9	Reinaldo Oliver	Puerto Rico	x	35.68	35.39				35.68	
10	Rodolfo Sedas	Mexico	35.66	35.54	x				35.66	
11	Gerardo Devilliers	Cuba	34.30	35.33	34.89				35.33	
12	José Villareal	Mexico	34.55	33.90	33.25				34.55	
13	Julio Noltenius	El Salvador	x	32.97	x				32.97	
14	Víctor Castañeda	El Salvador	32.15	31.66	30.24				32.15	

=== Hammer throw ===
10 March

Rank	Name	Nationality	#1	#2	#3	#4	#5	#6	Result	Notes
1st place, gold medalist(s)	Luis Betancourt	Cuba	41.20	x	46.37	35.90	46.96	x	46.96	GR
2nd place, silver medalist(s)	Jaime Annexy	Puerto Rico	46.00	x	42.30	44.69	45.17	46.82	46.82	
3rd place, bronze medalist(s)	Enrique Lagoyette	Colombia	43.85	43.10	x	41.71	45.19	36.80	45.19	NR
4	Francisco Fragoso	Mexico	42.43	42.88	x	x	x	44.64	44.64	
5	Enrique Isturiz	Venezuela	39.71	43.71	x	42.50	42.51	x	43.71	
6	Daniel Alvarado	Venezuela	x	42.87	x	43.50	x	42.30	43.50	
7	José Raúl Becerra	Cuba	41.40	42.36	42.84				42.84	
8	Bernabé Sánchez	Cuba	40.91	41.88	40.12				41.88	
9	Vicente Lagoyette	Colombia	41.82	41.77	41.34				41.82	
10	Alejandro Rueda	Mexico	37.81	39.47	41.30				41.30	
11	Mauricio Rodríguez	Venezuela	40.69	x	x				40.69	
12	Israél Capacete	Puerto Rico	x	38.60	x				38.60	
13	Humberto Cruz	Mexico	37.34	37.35	37.19				37.35	

=== Javelin throw ===
11 March – old model

Rank	Name	Nationality	#1	#2	#3	#4	#5	#6	Result	Notes
1st place, gold medalist(s)	Reinaldo Oliver	Puerto Rico	62.17	60.81	65.75	57.85	67.71	58.30	67.71	GR
2nd place, silver medalist(s)	Carlos Fajer	Mexico	x	57.92	55.00	61.79	x	56.82	61.79	
3rd place, bronze medalist(s)	Guillermo Pasalacqua	Puerto Rico	x	54.80	51.42	53.21	52.14	54.97	54.97	
4	Alberto Vera	Mexico	x	52.08	53.91	48.68	52.54	51.53	53.91	
5	José Antonio Hernández	Cuba	41.93	52.68	47.38	53.40	50.58	45.95	53.40	
6	Ricardo Juárez	Mexico	48.43	x	52.81	x	48.64	48.38	52.81	
7	Mario Salas	Cuba	47.49	45.23	52.09				52.09	
8	Felipe Rojas	Dominican Republic	x	47.74	50.63				50.63	
9	Manuel Gómez	Venezuela	x	49.24	50.33				50.33	
10	Brígido Iriarte	Venezuela	38.21	45.07	50.13				50.13	
11	Francisco Coimbre	Puerto Rico	x	41.41	49.24				49.24	

=== Pentathlon ===
12 January – 1952 tables

The highest mark recorded in each event is highlighted in yellow

Rank	Athlete	Nationality	LJ	JT	200m	DT	1500m	Points	Notes
1st place, gold medalist(s)	Brígido Iriarte	Venezuela	6.65	53.21	23.6	39.88	5:11.5	2748	
2nd place, silver medalist(s)	Héctor Román	Puerto Rico	6.73	48.34	22.5	37.55	6:18.8	2597	
3rd place, bronze medalist(s)	Reinaldo Oliver	Puerto Rico	6.10	62.05	23.3	34.04	5:50.4	2494	
4	Manuel Gómez	Venezuela	6.53	51.12	23.2	33.40	5:28.0	2474	
5	José Elías Anderson	Cuba	6.14	42.87	22.8	31.60	5:07.3	2360	
6	Norberto Cruz	Puerto Rico	6.19	43.34	23.0	33.51	5:30.7	2265	
7	Pablo de la Mota	Dominican Republic	5.58	46.27	24.5	28.85	4:46.4	2141	
8	Felipe Rojas	Dominican Republic	5.93	48.34	23.9	31.59	5:26.0	2141	
9	Jorge Aguirre	Mexico	6.50	39.57	23.6	24.75	5:08.8	2122	
10	Julio Barrera	El Salvador	5.94	40.45	24.0	27.52	4:51.6	2122	
11	Alfaro Parra	Colombia	6.52	40.50	22.8	27.44	DNF	2114	
12	Elías Forzán	Mexico	5.76	36.78	23.0	30.15	5.08.0	2106	
13	Mauricio Rodríguez	Venezuela	5.58	43.33	26.5	41.52	DNF	2114	
14	Marco Dardon	Guatemala	5.34	35.98	24.3	24.85	4:52.0	1816	
15	Amador Terán	Mexico	5.43	44.80	23.9	26.26	DNF	1737	

== Women's results ==
=== 100 metres ===
Heats – 9 March

Rank	Heat	Name	Nationality	Time	Notes
1	1	Bertha Díaz	Cuba	12.0	Q, GR
2	1	Dolores Worrell	Panama	12.0	Q
3	1	Esther Villalón	Mexico	12.6	
3	1	Silvia González	Colombia	12.7	
1	2	Carlota Gooden	Panama	12.0	Q, =GR
2	2	Cynthia Thompson	Jamaica	12.4	Q
3	2	Nereida Borges	Cuba	12.9	
4	2	Ana Cecilia Cárdenas	Colombia	12.9	
5	2	Bertha Aguilar	Mexico	13.1	
1	3	Hyacinth Walters	Jamaica	12.0	Q, =GR
2	3	Alejandrina Correa	Colombia	12.2	Q
3	3	Lydia Ewing	Guatemala	12.4	
4	3	María Bell	Panama	12.6	
5	3	Belkis Rodríguez	Cuba	13.0	
6	3	Sara Pantoja	Mexico	13.2	

Final – 10 March

Rank	Lane	Name	Nationality	Time	Notes
1st place, gold medalist(s)	7	Carlota Gooden	Panama	12.1 (12.32)	
2nd place, silver medalist(s)	6	Hyacinth Walters	Jamaica	12.1 (12.34)	
3rd place, bronze medalist(s)	4	Bertha Díaz	Cuba	12.4 (12.52)	
4	2	Cynthia Thompson	Jamaica	12.4	
5	5	Alejandrina Correa	Colombia	12.5	
	3	Dolores Worrell	Panama	?	

=== 80 metres hurdles ===
Heats – 10 March

Rank	Heat	Name	Nationality	Time	Notes
1	1	Kathleen Russell	Jamaica	12.5	Q
2	1	Ana Cecilia Cárdenas	Colombia	13.0	Q, NR
	1	Cristy del Pino	Cuba	?	
	1	Ana María Vázquez	Mexico	?	
1	2	Lydia Ewing	Guatemala	12.7	Q
2	2	Carmen Valdez	Cuba	13.2	Q
3	2	Esther Osada	Mexico	14.7	
	2	Nubia Sánchez	Colombia	?	
	2	Kathleen Robotham	Jamaica	?	
1	3	Amalia Yubi	Mexico	12.0	Q, GR
2	3	Gloria Tait	Panama	13.0	Q
3	3	Nereida Borges	Cuba	14.0	
	3	Alba Sánchez	Colombia	?	

Final – 11 March

Rank	Lane	Name	Nationality	Time	Notes
1st place, gold medalist(s)	2	Amalia Yubi	Mexico	12.3	
2nd place, silver medalist(s)	3	Kathleen Russell	Jamaica	12.5	
3rd place, bronze medalist(s)	7	Gloria Tait	Panama	13.0	
4	4	Lydia Ewing	Guatemala	13.0	
5	6	Carmen Valdez	Cuba	13.4	
6	5	Ana Cecilia Cárdenas	Colombia	13.6	

=== 4 × 100 metres relay ===
12 March

Rank	Lane	Nation	Competitors	Time	Notes
1st place, gold medalist(s)	6	Panama	Dolores Worrell, María Bell, Gloria Tait, Carlota Gooden	47.3 (47.49)	GR
2nd place, silver medalist(s)	3	Jamaica	Kathleen Russell, Kathleen Robotham, Cynthia Thompson, Hyacinth Walters	48.2 (48.34)	
3rd place, bronze medalist(s)	4	Cuba	Nereida Borges, Vilma Santos, Belkis Rodríguez, Berta Díaz	48.7 (48.81)	
4	5	Colombia	Silvia González, Ana Cecilia Cárdenas, Nubia Sánchez, Alejandrina Correa	50.2	NR
5	2	Mexico	Sara Pantoja, Amalia Yubi, Esther Villalón, Bertha Aguilar	50.2	

=== High jump ===
8 March

Rank	Name	Nationality	1.25	1.30	1.32	1.34	1.36	1.38	1.40	1.42	1.44	1.47	1.50	Result	Notes
1st place, gold medalist(s)	Kathleen Russell	Jamaica	–	o	–	o	o	o	o	o	o	o	o	1.50	
2nd place, silver medalist(s)	Kathleen Robotham	Jamaica	–	o	–	o	o	o	o	xo	o	o	xxx	1.47	
3rd place, bronze medalist(s)	Sheila Leyva	Venezuela	o	o	o	o	o	o	o	xo	xxx			1.42	
4	Hilda Harvey	Cuba	o	o	o	o	o	o	xxx					1.38	
5	Cristy del Pino	Cuba	o	xo	o	o	o	o	xxx					1.38	
6	Bertha Fernández	Cuba	xo	o	o	xxx								1.32	
7	Rosa Iwadare	Mexico	xo	xo	xxx									1.30	
8	Martha Escudero	Mexico	xo	xxx										1.25	
8	Beatriz Bongil	Mexico	xo	xxx										1.25	
	Jane Jordan	Guatemala	xxx											NM	

=== Discus throw ===
7 March

Rank	Name	Nationality	#1	#2	#3	#4	#5	#6	Result	Notes
1st place, gold medalist(s)	Alejandrina Herrera	Cuba	34.11	37.18	31.30	32.09	35.41	29.83	37.18	GR
2nd place, silver medalist(s)	Lili Schluter	Mexico	35.69	26.15	35.17	30.71	36.04	x	36.04	
3rd place, bronze medalist(s)	Concepción Villanueva	Mexico	33.27	35.51	33.65	34.23	32.11	32.47	35.51	
4	Carmen Córcega	Venezuela	32.86	30.63	28.59	29.94	25.66	23.50	32.86	
5	Ana Mercedes Campos	El Salvador	x	32.73	x	31.53	32.04	30.72	32.73	
6	Judith Caballero	Panama	29.82	27.44	28.45	17.18	22.64	25.65	29.82	
7	Bertha Fernández	Cuba	21.40	28.90	22.76				28.90	
8	Josefina Rivero	Venezuela	28.50	28.76	x				28.76	
9	Bertha Chiu	Mexico	x	x	28.69				28.69	
10	Martha Sánchez	Colombia	25.71	22.93	28.51				28.51	
11	Hilda Harvey	Cuba	27.77	26.71	24.60				27.77	
12	Mabel Aguayo	Puerto Rico	24.84	25.24	24.60				25.24	
13	María del Carmen Cuéllar	Guatemala	x	18.05	17.91				18.05	

=== Javelin throw ===
10 March – old model

Rank	Name	Nationality	#1	#2	#3	#4	#5	#6	Result	Notes
1st place, gold medalist(s)	Ana Mercedes Campos	El Salvador	35.27	x	x	34.01	34.11	38.82	38.82	GR
2nd place, silver medalist(s)	Bertha Chiu	Mexico	38.35	35.35	35.38	35.35	38.05	38.43	38.43	
3rd place, bronze medalist(s)	Amalia Yubi	Mexico	32.21	37.45	36.15	33.98	32.40	30.83	37.45	
4	Rosa Gudiño	Mexico	32.03	32.28	34.18	32.43	30.68	28.98	34.18	
5	Carmen Valdez	Cuba	26.69	x	33.23	31.64	21.68	27.50	33.23	
6	Cheila Leyva	Venezuela	23.80	31.72	29.28	28.39	31.02	25.26	31.72	
7	Judith Caballero	Panama	30.83	31.08	29.41				31.08	
8	Josefina Rivero	Venezuela	29.96	28.96	30.72				30.72	
9	Alejandrina Herrera	Cuba	29.46	30.38	28.79				30.38	
10	Carmen Córcega	Venezuela	29.01	29.04	27.36				29.04	
11	Dolly Molina	Colombia	22.58	x	27.85				27.85	
12	María del Carmen Cuéllar	Guatemala	26.38	27.69	x				27.69	
13	Mabel Aguayo	Puerto Rico	x	23.45	26.62				26.62	
