= Athletics at the 1955 Pan American Games – Men's 4 × 400 metres relay =

Men's 4 × 400 metres relay at the Pan American Games

The men's 4 × 400 metres relay event at the 1955 Pan American Games was held at the Estadio Universitario in Mexico City on 19 March.

== Results ==
Rank	Nation	Athletes	Time	Notes
1st place, gold medalist(s)	United States	Jesse Mashburn, Lon Spurrier, Jim Lea, Lou Jones	3:07.43	GR
2nd place, silver medalist(s)	Jamaica	Keith Gardner, Richard Stick, Mel Spence, Allan Moore	3:12.63	
3rd place, bronze medalist(s)	Venezuela	Guillermo Gutiérrez, Apolinar Solórzano, Evaristo Edie, Juan Leiva	3:15.93	
4	Puerto Rico	Amadeo Francis, Ismael Delgado, Frank Rivera, Ovidio de Jesús	3:16.38	
5	Brazil	Wilson Carneiro, José da Conceição, Waldemiro Monteiro, Argemiro Roque	3:16.71	
6	Colombia	Zadoc Guardiola, Antonio Vanegas, Carlos Sierra, Jaime Aparicio	3:20.08	
7	Mexico	Jorge Terán, Gilberto Trejo, Pablo Salinas, José Tenreyro	3:21.42	
