= Héctor Román =

Puerto Rican decathlete

Personal information
- Full name: Héctor Román Selva
- Nationality: Puerto Rican
- Born: 7 January 1933 (age 93)

Sport
- Sport: Athletics
- Event: Decathlon

Héctor Román Selva (born 7 January 1933) is a Puerto Rican athlete. He competed in the men's decathlon at the 1952 Summer Olympics.

== International competitions ==
Year	Competition	Venue	Position	Event	Notes
Representing Puerto Rico
1952	Olympic Games	Helsinki, Finland	20th	Decathlon	5264 pts
1954	Central American and Caribbean Games	Mexico City, Mexico	8th	Long jump	6.66 m
1954	Central American and Caribbean Games	Mexico City, Mexico	7th	Triple jump	13.80 m
1954	Central American and Caribbean Games	Mexico City, Mexico	2nd	Pentathlon	2597 pts
1959	Central American and Caribbean Games	Caracas, Venezuela	5th	Long jump	6.55 m
1959	Central American and Caribbean Games	Caracas, Venezuela	2nd	Pentathlon	2627 pts

== Personal bests ==
- Decathlon – 5834 pts (1952)
