= Athletics at the 1955 Pan American Games – Men's 400 metres hurdles =

Men's 400 metres hurdles at the Pan American Games

The men's 400 metres hurdles event at the 1955 Pan American Games was held at the Estadio Universitario in Mexico City on 14 March.

== Results ==
| Rank | Name | Nationality | Time | Notes |
|---|---|---|---|---|
| 1st place, gold medalist(s) | Josh Culbreath | United States | 51.5 | GR |
| 2nd place, silver medalist(s) | Jaime Aparicio | Colombia | 51.8 | |
| 3rd place, bronze medalist(s) | Wilson Carneiro | Brazil | 53.0 | |
| 4 | Amadeo Francis | Puerto Rico | 53.9 | |
| 5 | Juan Leiva | Venezuela | 54.7 | |
| 6 | Óscar Fernández | Mexico | 56.1 | |
| 7 | Miguel Menéndez | Mexico | 56.6 | |
