= Byron LaBeach =

Jamaican sprinter (1930–2021)

Byron LaBeach (11 October 1930 – 12 December 2021) was a Jamaican sprinter who competed in the 1952 Summer Olympics.

== Life and career ==
LaBeach was born in Kingston, Jamaica, on 11 October 1930. He won gold medals at the Central American and Caribbean Games with the Jamaican 4×100 metres relay and 4×400 metres relay teams. He was the brother of Panamanian sprinter Lloyd La Beach. Byron LaBeach died on 12 December 2021, at the age of 91.

== Competition record ==
Year	Competition	Venue	Position	Event	Notes
Representing Jamaica
1952	Olympic Gamess	Helsinki, Finland	17th (qf)	100 m	11.05
1954	Central American and Caribbean Games	Mexico City, Mexico	4th	100 m	10.8
1954	Central American and Caribbean Games	Mexico City, Mexico	5th	200 m	22.2
1954	Central American and Caribbean Games	Mexico City, Mexico	1st	4 × 100 m relay	41.06
1954	Central American and Caribbean Games	Mexico City, Mexico	1st	4 × 400 m relay	3:12.25
