= Gerardo Bönnhoff =

German-born Argentine sprinter

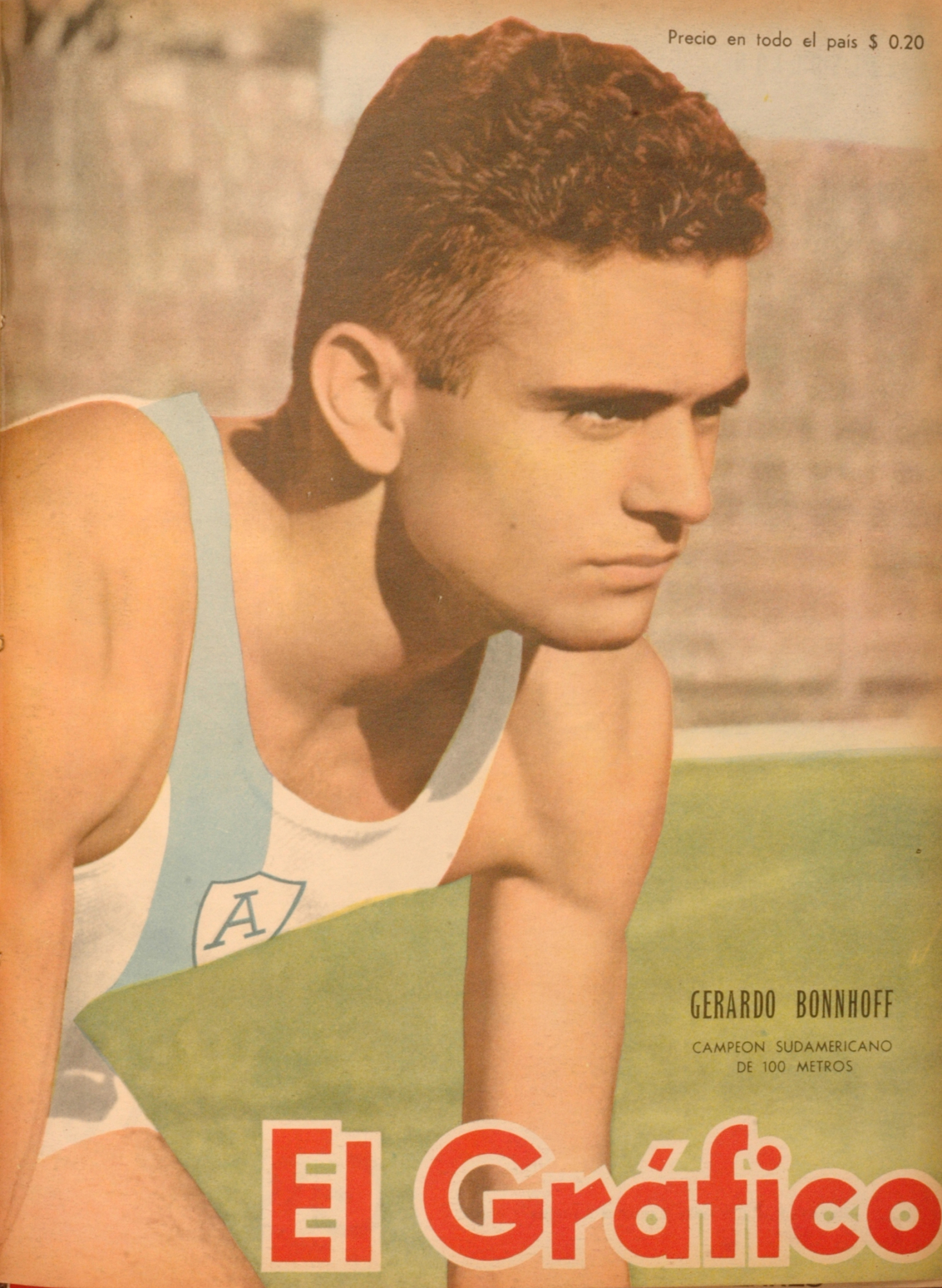
- Bönnhoff in El Gráfico, 1947

Personal information
- Born: Gerhard Bönnhoff Koch; June 24, 1926 Berlin, Germany
- Died: December 26, 2013 (aged 87) Ciudad Jardín Lomas del Palomar, Buenos Aires, Argentina
- Height: 1.69 m (5 ft 7 in)
- Weight: 58 kg (128 lb)

Sport
- Sport: Sprint (running)
- Events: 100 metres, 200 metres, 4 × 100 metres relay

Achievements and titles
- Olympic finals: 6th place, 200 metres, 1952 Summer Olympics

Gerardo Bönnhoff
Medal record

Men's athletics

Representing Argentina

Pan American Games
Bronze medal – third place	1951 Buenos Aires	4x100 m relay

South American Championships
Gold medal – first place	1947 Rio de Janeiro	100 m
Silver medal – second place	1947 Rio de Janeiro	200 m
Gold medal – first place	1947 Rio de Janeiro	4×100 metres relay
Silver medal – second place	1949 Lima	4×100 metres relay
Gold medal – first place	1952 Buenos Aires	200 m
Silver medal – second place	1952 Buenos Aires	100 m
Silver medal – second place	1952 Buenos Aires	4×100 metres relay
Bronze medal – third place	1952 Buenos Aires	4×400 metres relay}
Silver medal – second place	1956 Santiago	100 m
Bronze medal – third place	1956 Santiago	200 m
Silver medal – second place	1956 Santiago	4×100 metres relay
Bronze medal – third place	1956 Santiago	4×400 metres relay

Gerardo Bönnhoff Koch (born Gerhard Bönnhoff Koch; 24 June 1926 – 26 December 2013) was a German-born Argentine athlete who competed mainly in sprinting.

Born in Berlin, his family moved to Argentina when Bönnhoff was 10 years old. In 1947, at the age of 21, he became an Argentine citizen and legally changed his name from Gerhard to Gerardo. He excelled at the 100m and 200m, and in 1945 he became the 100m Junior South American record holder running in a time of 10.3 sec.

He competed in the 100 m, 200 m and the 4 × 100 m, at the 1948 Summer Olympics but did not get past the 2nd round in any. In 1951 he won the bronze medal at the Pan American Games held in Buenos Aires in the 4 × 100 m relay. He reached the final of the 200 m in the 1952 Summer Olympics and finished sixth.

Bönnhoff was a co-founder of the Confederación Argentina de Atletismo, (CADA).

He died on 26 December 2013 in Ciudad Jardín Lomas del Palomar, Buenos Aires.

== International competitions ==
Year	Competition	Venue	Position	Event	Notes
Representing Argentina
1947	South American Championships	Rio de Janeiro, Brazil	1st	100 m	11.0
1947	South American Championships	Rio de Janeiro, Brazil	2nd	200 m	22.3
1947	South American Championships	Rio de Janeiro, Brazil	1st	4 × 100 m relay	42.3
1948	Olympic Games	London, United Kingdom	21st (qf)	100 m	11.09
1948	Olympic Games	London, United Kingdom	4th (qf)	200 m	NT
1948	Olympic Games	London, United Kingdom	8th (h)	4 × 100 m relay	42.4
1949	South American Championships	Lima, Peru	3rd (h)	100 m	11.2
1949	South American Championships	Lima, Peru	3rd (h)	200 m	22.7
1949	South American Championships	Lima, Peru	2nd	4 × 100 m relay	42.3
1951	Pan American Games	Buenos Aires, Argentina	8th (sf)	100 m	11.3
1951	Pan American Games	Buenos Aires, Argentina	4th	200 m	21.9
1951	Pan American Games	Buenos Aires, Argentina	3rd	4 × 100 m relay	41.8
1952	South American Championships	Buenos Aires, Argentina	2nd	100 m	10.8
1952	South American Championships	Buenos Aires, Argentina	1st	200 m	21.5
1952	South American Championships	Buenos Aires, Argentina	1st	4 × 100 m relay	41.4
1952	South American Championships	Buenos Aires, Argentina	2nd	4 × 400 m relay	3:18.0
1952	Olympic Games	Helsinki, Finland	6th	200 m	21.59
1952	Olympic Games	Helsinki, Finland	7th (sf)	4 × 100 m relay	41.4
1953	South American Championships (unofficial)	Santiago, Chile	1st	100 m	10.9
1953	South American Championships (unofficial)	Santiago, Chile	1st	200 m	21.8
1953	South American Championships (unofficial)	Santiago, Chile	2nd	4 × 100 m relay	41.9
1953	South American Championships (unofficial)	Santiago, Chile	3rd	4 × 400 m relay	3:19.4
1955	Pan American Games	Mexico City, Mexico	4th (sf)	200 m	21.3
1955	Pan American Games	Mexico City, Mexico	4th	4 × 100 m relay	42.12
1956	South American Championships	Santiago, Chile	2nd	100 m	10.7
1956	South American Championships	Santiago, Chile	3rd	200 m	10.7
1956	South American Championships	Santiago, Chile	2nd	4 × 100 m relay	41.5
1956	South American Championships	Santiago, Chile	3rd	4 × 400 m relay	3:16.8
1957	South American Championships (unofficial)	Santiago, Chile	3rd	100 m	11.0
1957	South American Championships (unofficial)	Santiago, Chile	6th	200 m	22.4
1957	South American Championships (unofficial)	Santiago, Chile	2nd	4 × 100 m relay	41.6
1957	World Festival of Youth and Students	Moscow, Soviet Union	(h)	100 m	11.1
1957	World Festival of Youth and Students	Moscow, Soviet Union	(h)	200 m	22.8
1959	South American Championships (unofficial)	São Paulo, Brazil	3rd	4 × 100 m relay	44.1
1960	Ibero-American Games	Santiago, Chile	8th (sf)	200 m	21.7
1960	Ibero-American Games	Santiago, Chile	5th	4 × 100 m relay	42.3
1960	Ibero-American Games	Santiago, Chile	5th	4 × 400 m relay	3:18.5

== Personal bests ==
- 100 metres – 10.3h (Buenos Aire 1945)
- 200 metres – 21.3h (Buenos Aires 1947), 21.59 (+1.0 m/s, Helsinki 1952)
