= Keith Gardner =

Jamaican athlete

Personal information
- Nationality: Jamaican
- Born: 6 September 1929 Kingston, Jamaica
- Died: 25 May 2012 (aged 82) Livingston, New Jersey, USA
- Height: 175 cm (5 ft 9 in)
- Weight: 64 kg (141 lb)

Sport
- Sport: Athletics
- Event: sprints / hurdles
Medal record
Men's Athletics
Representing British West Indies
Olympic Games
| Bronze medal – third place | 1960 Rome | 4x400 metres relay |
Representing Jamaica
British Empire and Commonwealth Games
| Gold medal – first place | 1954 Vancouver | 120 yard hurdles |
| Gold medal – first place | 1958 Cardiff | 100 yard Dash |
| Gold medal – first place | 1958 Cardiff | 120 yards hurdles |
| Silver medal – second place | 1958 Cardiff | 220 yard dash |
| Bronze medal – third place | 1958 Cardiff | 4x440yards relay |
Pan American Games
| Silver medal – second place | 1955 Mexico City | 110 m hurdles |
Central American and Caribbean Games
| Gold medal – first place | 1954 Mexico City | 4x400m |

Keith Alvin Saint Hope Gardner (6 September 1929 – 25 May 2012) was a Jamaican athlete who competed in the 110 metre hurdles, 100 metres, 200 metres, and 400 metres, who competed at the 1960 Summer Olympics.

== Biography ==
In 1954, Gardner won a gold medal for Jamaica at the 1954 British Empire and Commonwealth Games in Vancouver, Canada over the 120 yard hurdles.

Gardner won the British AAA Championships title in the 120 yards hurdles event at the 1958 AAA Championships. Shortly afterwards he represented the Jamaican team at the 1958 British Empire and Commonwealth Games in Cardiff, Wales, where he four medals, including two golds.

Gardner competed for the British West Indies in the 1960 Olympic Games held in Rome, Italy in the 4 x 400 metre relay, where he won the bronze medal with his teammates Malcolm Spence, James Wedderburn, and George Kerr.

== Competition record ==
| Year | Competition | Venue | Position | Event | Notes |
Representing Jamaica
| 1954 | Central American and Caribbean Games | Mexico City, Mexico | 6th (sf) | 100 m | 10.8 |
| 1954 | Central American and Caribbean Games | Mexico City, Mexico | 2nd | 110 m hurdles | 14.5 |
| 1954 | Central American and Caribbean Games | Mexico City, Mexico | 1st | 4 × 100 m relay | 41.06 |
| 1954 | Central American and Caribbean Games | Mexico City, Mexico | 1st | 4 × 400 m relay | 3:12.25 |
| 1954 | Central American and Caribbean Games | Mexico City, Mexico | 3rd | Long jump | 7.02 m |
| 1954 | British Empire and Commonwealth Games | Vancouver, Canada | 1st | 120 y hurdles | 14.2 |
| 1954 | British Empire and Commonwealth Games | Vancouver, Canada | 6th | 4 × 110 y relay | NT |
| 1954 | British Empire and Commonwealth Games | Vancouver, Canada | 6th | 4 × 440 y relay | 3:19.0 |
| 1954 | British Empire and Commonwealth Games | Vancouver, Canada | 9th | Long jump | 6.66 m |
| 1955 | Pan American Games | Mexico City, Mexico | 4th | 100 m | 10.5 |
| 1955 | Pan American Games | Mexico City, Mexico | 2nd | 110 m hurdles | 14.74 |
| 1955 | Pan American Games | Mexico City, Mexico | 2nd | 4 × 400 m relay | 3:12.63 |
| 1956 | Olympic Games^{1} | Melbourne, Australia | 44th (h) | 100 m | 11.22 |
| 1956 | Olympic Games^{1} | Melbourne, Australia | 11th (h) | 110 m hurdles | 14.65 |
| 1956 | Olympic Games^{1} | Melbourne, Australia | 7th (h) | 4 × 400 m relay | 3:11.07^{1} |
| 1957 | British West Indies Championships | Kingston, Jamaica | 2nd | 110 m hurdles | 14.7 |
| 1957 | British West Indies Championships | Kingston, Jamaica | 1st | 4 × 100 m relay | 41.9 |
| 1958 | British Empire and Commonwealth Games | Cardiff, United Kingdom | 1st | 100 y | 9.66 |
| 1958 | British Empire and Commonwealth Games | Cardiff, United Kingdom | 2nd | 220 y | 21.11 |
| 1958 | British Empire and Commonwealth Games | Cardiff, United Kingdom | 1st | 120 y hurdles | 14.20 (w) |
| 1958 | British Empire and Commonwealth Games | Cardiff, United Kingdom | 3rd | 4 × 440 y relay | 3:10.08 |
| 1959 | British West Indies Championships | Georgetown, British Guiana | 3rd | 100 m | |
| 1959 | British West Indies Championships | Georgetown, British Guiana | 2nd | 200 m | |
| 1959 | British West Indies Championships | Georgetown, British Guiana | 1st | 110 m hurdles | 14.4 |
| 1960 | British West Indies Championships | Kingston, Jamaica | 2nd | 200 m | 21.2 |
| 1960 | British West Indies Championships | Kingston, Jamaica | 1st | 110 m hurdles | 14.5 |
| 1960 | Olympic Games^{1} | Rome, Italy | 5th | 110 m hurdles | 14.55 |
| 1960 | Olympic Games^{1} | Rome, Italy | 3rd | 4 × 400 m relay | 3:04.13 |

^{1}Disqualified in the final
^{2}Representing the British West Indies

== Personal bests ==
- 100 metres – 10.3h (1958)
- 400 metres – 46.3hy (1958)
- 110 metres hurdles – 13.8h (1958)
