= Amadeo Francis =

Puerto Rican hurdler (1931–2024)

Personal information
- Full name: Amadeo Ignacio Daniel Francis Jr.
- Nationality: United States Virgin Islands
- Born: 22 October 1931 Saint Thomas, United States Virgin Islands
- Died: 25 August 2024 (aged 92) San Juan, Puerto Rico
- Height: 1.87 m (6 ft 2 in)
- Weight: 77 kg (170 lb)

Sport
- Sport: Track and field
- Event: 400 metres hurdles
Medal record
Men's athletics
Representing Puerto Rico
Central American and Caribbean Games
Silver medal – second place	1954 Mexico City	4 × 400 m relay
Bronze medal – third place	1954 Mexico City	400 m hurdles

Amadeo Ignacio Daniel Francis Jr. (22 October 1931 – 25 August 2024) was a Puerto Rican hurdler. He competed in the 400 metres hurdles at the 1952 Summer Olympics and the 1956 Summer Olympics. He later became the vice-president of the IAAF. Francis was born in Saint Thomas, U.S. Virgin Islands on 22 October 1931, to Amadeo Ignacio Daniel Francis Sr. and Ethanie Maria Francis. He later became a noted economist.

Francis died on 25 August 2024, at the age of 92.

== International competitions ==
Year	Competition	Venue	Position	Event	Notes
Representing Puerto Rico
1950	Central American and Caribbean Games	Guatemala City, Guatemala	10th (h)	400 m	51.3
1950	Central American and Caribbean Games	Guatemala City, Guatemala	4th	4 × 400 m relay	3:22.4
1952	Olympic Games	Helsinki, Finland	25th (h)	400 m hurdles	54.0
1954	Central American and Caribbean Games	Mexico City, Mexico	3rd	400 m hurdles	54.28
1954	Central American and Caribbean Games	Mexico City, Mexico	2nd	4 × 400 m relay	3:17.70
1955	Pan American Games	Mexico City, Mexico	4th	400 m hurdles	53.9
1955	Pan American Games	Mexico City, Mexico	4th	4 × 400 m relay	3:16.38
1956	Olympic Games	Melbourne, Australia	24th (h)	400 m hurdles	54.38

== Personal bests ==
- 400 metres hurdles – 53.3h (1954)
