= Amalia Yubi =

Mexican javelin thrower (born 1932)

Personal information
- Born: 31 January 1932 (age 94) San Juan, Sonora, Mexico

Sport
- Sport: Athletics
- Event: Javelin throw

Amalia Yubi Urías (born 31 January 1932) is a Mexican athlete. She competed in the women's javelin throw at the 1952 Summer Olympics.

Yubi was born in San Juan, now located in Tubutama Municipality, Sonora. She is of Japanese descent. In a 1954 article in Esto, Yubi was described as having worked as a seamstress and a typewriter.

Yubi was inducted into the Sonora Sports Hall of Fame class of 2009.

== International competitions ==
Year	Competition	Venue	Position	Event	Notes
Representing Mexico
1952	Olympic Games	Helsinki, Finland	19th (q)	Javelin throw	35.59 m
1954	Central American and Caribbean Games	Mexico City, Mexico	1st	80 m hurdles	12.3
1954	Central American and Caribbean Games	Mexico City, Mexico	5th	4 × 100 m relay	50.2
1954	Central American and Caribbean Games	Mexico City, Mexico	3rd	Javelin throw	37.45 m
