= Ovidio de Jesús =

Puerto Rican sprinter (1933–2011)

Personal information
- Full name: Ovidio de Jesús Vargas
- Nationality: Puerto Rican
- Born: 6 February 1933 Río Grande, Puerto Rico
- Died: 3 October 2011 (aged 78) San Juan, Puerto Rico
- Height: 1.75 m (5 ft 9 in)
- Weight: 66 kg (146 lb)

Sport
- Sport: Track and field
- Event(s): 400m hurdles, 4×400m
Medal record
Men's Athletics
Representing Puerto Rico
Ibero-American Games
Gold medal – first place	1960 Santiago	4x400 m relay
Bronze medal – third place	1960 Santiago	400 m hurdles

Ovidio de Jesús Vargas (6 February 1933 – 3 October 2011) was a Puerto Rican sprinter.

== Career ==
His international career began it in the 1954 Central American and Caribbean Games in Mexico City, Mexico conquering their first medals, silver in the 4 x 400 meters, relay bronze in the 400 meters and fourth in the 400 m safety fences. His consecration in the CAC games, became in the 1959 Central American and Caribbean Games in Caracas, Venezuela, winning three gold medals and be with his partner, Manuel Rivera, the top figures of the delegation. Their gold medals came in the 400 meter hurdles with a time of 53.42, beating out the favorite, the Venezuelan Víctor Maldonado. His second gold was dramatic, overcome in the goal to its arch-rival, Iván Rodríguez in the 400 meters.

Ovidio De Jesus was one of 23 members of the first delegation of Puerto Rico in the 1955 Pan American Games held in Mexico City, Mexico by participating in the 400 meters and the relay of 4 x 400 meters that arrived in fourth place, losing the bronze medal at the finish line with Venezuela. Four years later, at the 1959 Pan American Games in Chicago, Illinois competing in the 400 and 400 m hurdles.

He competed at the 1956 Summer Olympics in Melbourne, Australia and in the 1960 Summer Olympics in Rome, Italy.

== Landmarks ==
In Río Grande, Puerto Rico, its main outdoor stadium, the Ovidio de Jesús Ballpark, is named after him.

== International competitions ==
Year	Competition	Venue	Position	Event	Notes
Representing Puerto Rico
1954	Central American and Caribbean Games	Mexico City, Mexico	3rd	400 m	48.27
1954	Central American and Caribbean Games	Mexico City, Mexico	4th	400 m hurdles	54.5
1954	Central American and Caribbean Games	Mexico City, Mexico	2nd	4 × 400 m relay	3:17.70
1955	Pan American Games	Mexico City, Mexico	14th (h)	400 m	49.97
1955	Pan American Games	Mexico City, Mexico	4th	4 × 400 m relay	3:16.38
1956	Olympic Games	Melbourne, Australia	20th (h)	400 m hurdles	54.0
1956	Olympic Games	Melbourne, Australia	12th (h)	4 × 400 m relay	3:13.8
1959	Central American and Caribbean Games	Caracas, Venezuela	1st	400 m	48.73
1959	Central American and Caribbean Games	Caracas, Venezuela	1st	400 m hurdles	53.42
1959	Central American and Caribbean Games	Caracas, Venezuela	1st	4 × 400 m relay	3:16.91
1959	Pan American Games	Chicago, United States	11th (sf)	400 m	52.5
1959	Pan American Games	Chicago, United States	– (h)	400 m hurdles	DNF
1960	Olympic Games	Rome, Italy	14th (h)	4 × 400 m relay	3:13.91
1960	Ibero-American Games	Santiago, Chile	3rd	400 m hurdles	53.7
1960	Ibero-American Games	Santiago, Chile	1st	4 × 400 m relay	3:12.8
1962	Central American and Caribbean Games	Kingston, Jamaica	6th	400 m hurdles	56.8
1962	Central American and Caribbean Games	Kingston, Jamaica	3rd	4 × 400 m relay	3:15.8

== Personal bests ==
- 400 metres – 47.8h (1956)
- 400 metres hurdles – 52.1h (1956)
