= Evelio Planas =

Cuban sprinter

Personal information
- Full name: Eutimio Evelio Planas del Río
- Born: 20 January 1930 Santiago de Cuba, Cuba
- Height: 1.86 m (6 ft 1 in)
- Weight: 77 kg (170 lb)

Sport
- Sport: Sprinting
- Event: 400 metres
Medal record
Representing Cuba
Central American and Caribbean Games
Silver medal – second place	1950 Guatemala City	4x400m relay
Bronze medal – third place	1954 Mexico City	4x400m relay

Eutimio Evelio Planas del Río (born 20 January 1930) is a Cuban former sprinter. He competed in the men's 400 metres, 800 metres and 4 × 100 metres relay at the 1952 Summer Olympics. The relay team reached the semifinals.

== International competitions ==
Year	Competition	Venue	Position	Event	Notes
Representing Cuba
1950	Central American and Caribbean Games	Guatemala City, Guatemala	5th	800 m	2:01.7
1950	Central American and Caribbean Games	Guatemala City, Guatemala	2nd	4 × 400 m relay	3:19.0
1951	Pan American Games	Buenos Aires, Argentina	8th	800 m	1:56.6e
1951	Pan American Games	Buenos Aires, Argentina	4th	4 × 400 m relay	3:20.0
1952	Olympic Games	Helsinki, Finland	38th (h)	400 m	49.44
1952	Olympic Games	Helsinki, Finland	43rd (h)	800 m	1:57.6
1952	Olympic Games	Helsinki, Finland	8th (sf)	4 × 100 m relay	41.5
1954	Central American and Caribbean Games	Mexico City, Mexico	5th (sf)	400 m	49.1
1954	Central American and Caribbean Games	Mexico City, Mexico	4th (h)	800 m	1:59.8^{1}
1954	Central American and Caribbean Games	Mexico City, Mexico	3rd	4 × 400 m relay	3:17.83
1955	Pan American Games	Mexico City, Mexico	12th (h)	400 m	49.47
1955	Pan American Games	Mexico City, Mexico	7th	800 m	1:57.69
1955	Pan American Games	Mexico City, Mexico	7th	4 × 100 m relay	NT
1960	Ibero-American Games	Santiago, Chile	8th (h)	800 m	1:57.0
1961	Universiade	Sofia, Bulgaria	15th (h)	800 m	1:54.7
1961	Universiade	Sofia, Bulgaria	7th (h)	4 × 100 m relay	42.4
1962	Central American and Caribbean Games	Kingston, Jamaica	12th (h)	800 m	1:54.7
1962	Central American and Caribbean Games	Kingston, Jamaica	4th	4 × 400 m relay	3:17.1

^{1}Did not finish in the final

== Personal bests ==
- 100 metres – 11.5h (1955)
- 400 metres – 48.7h (1956)
- 800 metres – 1:53.9h (1961)
