= Ismael Delgado =

Puerto Rican sprinter (1929–2023)

Personal information
- Full name: Ismael Delgado Dávila
- Nationality: Puerto Rican
- Born: 5 December 1929 Aguada, Puerto Rico
- Died: 9 October 2023 (aged 93) USA
- Height: 1.80 m (5 ft 11 in)
- Weight: 70 kg (154 lb)

Sport
- Sport: Sprinting
- Events: 200 metres, 400 metres
Medal record
Representing Puerto Rico
Central American and Caribbean Games
Silver medal – second place	1954 Mexico	4×400 m relay

Ismael Delgado Dávila (5 December 1929 – 9 October 2023) was a Puerto Rican sprinter. He competed in the men's 4 × 400 metres relay at the 1956 Summer Olympics. Delgado served in the United States Army in the Korean War, where he was awarded two Purple Heart Medals. After returning from the military he finished his B.A. degree and became a teacher in Aguada but he shortly thereafter went into sports administration and sports journalism. Died on October 9, 2023 at age 93. He was buried at the Puerto Rico National Cemetery in Bayamón, Puerto Rico.

== International competitions ==
Year	Competition	Venue	Position	Event	Notes
Representing Puerto Rico
1950	Central American and Caribbean Games	Guatemala City, Guatemala	4th (h)	400 m	50.0
1950	Central American and Caribbean Games	Guatemala City, Guatemala	4th	4 × 400 m relay	NT
1954	Central American and Caribbean Games	Mexico City, Mexico	8th (sf)	200 m	22.0
1954	Central American and Caribbean Games	Mexico City, Mexico	2nd	4 × 400 m relay	3:17.70
1955	Pan American Games	Mexico City, Mexico	4th	4 × 400 m relay	3:16.38
1956	Olympic Games	Melbourne, Australia	12th (h)	4 × 400 m relay	3:13.81

== Personal bests ==
- 400 metres – 48.9h (1956)
