= Athletics at the 1955 Pan American Games – Men's high jump =

Men's high jump at the Pan American Games

The men's high jump event at the 1955 Pan American Games was held at the Estadio Universitario in Mexico City on 13 March.

== Results ==
Rank	Name	Nationality	Result	Notes
1st place, gold medalist(s)	Ernie Shelton	United States	2.01	GR
2nd place, silver medalist(s)	Herman Wyatt	United States	2.01	GR
3rd place, bronze medalist(s)	José da Conceição	Brazil	1.91	
4	Ernesto Lagos	Chile	1.89	
5	Roberto López-Jova	Cuba	1.86	
6	Gaspar Vigo	Puerto Rico	1.86	
7	Teófilo Davis	Venezuela	1.81	
8	Ramon López	Cuba	1.81	
9	Aldo Zuccolillo	Paraguay	1.81	
10	Joaquin Zúñiga	Mexico	1.70	
