= Luis Soriano =

Dominican Republic sprinter (1929–2016)

Personal information
- Full name: Luis Eduardo Soriano
- Nationality: Dominican
- Born: 8 March 1929 Santo Domingo, Dominican Republic
- Died: December 2016 (aged 87)
- Height: 1.55 m (5 ft 1 in)
- Weight: 60 kg (132 lb)

Sport
- Sport: Sprinting
- Event: 4 × 100 metres relay

Luis Eduardo Soriano (8 March 1929 – December 2016) was a Dominican Republic sprinter. He competed in the men's 4 × 100 metres relay at the 1968 Summer Olympics. Soriano died in December 2016, at the age of 87.

== International competitions ==
| Year | Competition | Venue | Position | Event | Notes |
Representing the Dominican Republic
| 1954 | Central American and Caribbean Games | Mexico City, Mexico | 17th (sf) | 100 m | 11.2 |
| 1954 | Central American and Caribbean Games | Mexico City, Mexico | 19th (h) | 200 m | 23.1 |
| 1954 | Central American and Caribbean Games | Mexico City, Mexico | 7th (h) | 4 × 100 m relay | 44.1 |
| 1955 | Pan American Games | Mexico City, Mexico | 11th (h) | 200 m | 22.61 |
| 1955 | Pan American Games | Mexico City, Mexico | 6th | 4 × 100 m relay | 42.64 |
| 1968 | Olympic Games | Mexico City, Mexico | 18th (h) | 4 × 100 m relay | 41.48 |
