= Enrique Beckles =

Argentine sprinter

Personal information
- Full name: Enrique Jaime Beckles Mapp
- Born: 5 August 1927 (age 99) Buenos Aires, Argentina

Sport
- Sport: Sprinting
- Event: 100 metres

Enrique Jaime Beckles Mapp (born 5 August 1927) is a retired Argentine sprinter. He competed in the men's 100 metres at the 1952 Summer Olympics.

== International competitions ==
| Year | Competition | Venue | Position | Event | Notes |
Representing Argentina
| 1951 | Pan American Games | Buenos Aires, Argentina | 5th (sf) | 100 m | NT |
| 1952 | South American Championships | Buenos Aires, Argentina | 1st | 4 × 100 m relay | 41.4 |
| 1952 | Olympic Games | Helsinki, Finland | – (h) | 100 m | DQ |
| 1952 | Olympic Games | Helsinki, Finland | 53rd (h) | 200 m | 22.73 |
| 1952 | Olympic Games | Helsinki, Finland | 7th (sf) | 4 × 100 m relay | 41.4 |
| 1953 | South American Championships (unofficial) | Santiago, Chile | 2nd | 4 × 100 m relay | 41.9 |
| 1955 | Pan American Games | Mexico City, Mexico | 4th | 4 × 100 m relay | 42.12 |
| 1957 | South American Championships (unofficial) | Santiago, Chile | 6th | 400 m | 50.9 |
| 1957 | South American Championships (unofficial) | Santiago, Chile | 3rd | 4 × 100 m relay | 3:21.4 |

== Personal bests ==
- 100 metres – 10.6h (Buenos Aires 1950)
