= Art Bragg =

American sprinter (1930–2018)

Personal information
- Full name: Arthur George Bragg
- Born: December 3, 1930 Baltimore, Maryland, U.S.
- Died: August 25, 2018 (aged 87)
- Height: 5 ft 9 in (175 cm)
- Weight: 154 lb (70 kg)

Sport
- Sport: Running
- Events: 100 meters, 200 meters
- College team: Morgan State Bears

Achievements and titles
- Personal bests: 100 y: 9.4 s (1954) 100 m: 10.3 s (1953); 220 y: 20.8 s (1951) 200 m;21.2 s (1950)
Medal record
Men's athletics
Representing the United States
Pan American Games
Gold medal – first place	1951 Buenos Aires	4 × 100 m relay
Silver medal – second place	1951 Buenos Aires	100 m
Silver medal – second place	1951 Buenos Aires	200 m

Arthur George Bragg (December 3, 1930 – August 25, 2018) was an American sprinter who competed in the 1952 Summer Olympics.

== Career ==
He was born in Baltimore and attended Baltimore's Morgan State College.,

In 1952 he was eliminated in the semi-finals of the Olympic 100 metres event. Running with a pulled muscle, he finished 'a miserable last' in his race. Bragg was considered the favourite for the title having won the USA Olympic Trials 100m in the absence, through injury, of the man judged to be the best American sprinter, Jim Golliday. Bragg also tried to qualify for the 200 m event but was only fourth in his semi-final at the Olympic Trials.

At the 1951 Pan American Games he was a member of the American relay team which won the gold medal in the 4×100 metres competition. In the 100 metres contest as well as in the 200 metres event he won the silver medal. In both races he lost narrowly to Cuba's Rafael Fortun.

Always a keen college runner, in 1953, Bragg helped, as anchor leg, Morgan State College to victories in the quarter- and half-mile relays at the Penn Relays. (Note: quarter-mile relay is 4 x 110 y; half-mile relay is 4 x 220 y) Bragg also completed a triple of individual wins.

Bragg continued running after leaving college. In 1954 he won the 100 and 220 yards titles at the AAU Championships. In both he established new AAU meet records of 9.4 and 21.1 s respectively.

Bragg was famed at the time he was racing for his often slow start to his races with a subsequent fast finish and the disappointments he suffered in his career at the major championships.

In 1954, Bragg was one of the candidates for the prestigious James E. Sullivan Award that is presented annually by the AAU to the outstanding American athlete. If he had won he would have been the first African-American recipient of the award. In the end, the award went to Mal Whitfield.

Bragg has admitted his Olympic disappointment lives with him - when watching the 100 m "I cried," Bragg said. "I had successes; that was the major disappointment. Every Olympics, when I watch the 100 on TV, I break down and cry." He has described his 1952 injury as a total fluke - whilst on the warmup strip "Someone opened one of the doors and I made a quick motion to my left to avoid hitting it . . . oops, the hamstring went.".

In later years, Bragg is reported as living in Los Angeles and working for Los Angeles County Probation Department as a Deputy Probation Officer. He is married with one child, a boy. He left for California in 1956 and never returned to Maryland. His son studied at Howard University.

== Rankings ==
Bragg was ranked among the best in the US and the world in both the 100 m/100 y and 200 m/220 y sprint events from 1950 to 1954, according to the votes of the experts of Track and Field News.

100 meters/100 yards
Year	World rank	US rank
1950	4th	3rd
1951	6th	3rd
1952	6th	4th
1953	2nd	2nd
1954	2nd	1st

200 meters/220 yards
Year	World rank	US rank
1950	10th	6th
1951	6th	4th
1952	-	-
1953	2nd	2nd
1954	3rd	2nd

== USA Championships ==
Bragg was a strong performer at the AAU championships, the USA national championships.

USA Championships
Year	100y	220y
1950	-	2nd
1951	-	-
1952	-	-
1953	1st	2nd
1954	1st	1st

== Competition record ==
Year	Competition	Venue	Position	Event	Notes
Representing United States
1952	Olympics	Helsinki, Finland	6th, SF 1	100 m	11.43/10.9
