= Víctorio Solares =

Guatemalan middle-distance runner

Personal information
- Full name: Víctorio Hugo Solares Hurtate
- Nationality: Guatemalan
- Born: 5 February 1932 (age 94)

Sport
- Sport: Middle-distance running
- Event: 800 metres

Víctorio Hugo Solares Hurtate (born 5 February 1932) is a Guatemalan middle-distance runner. He competed in the men's 800 metres at the 1952 Summer Olympics. Solaris finished seventh in the 1955 Pan American Games 3000 metre steeplechase.

== International competitions ==
| Year | Competition | Venue | Position | Event | Notes |
Representing Guatemala
| 1952 | Olympic Games | Helsinki, Finland | 48th (h) | 800 m | 2:01.4 |
| 1952 | Olympic Games | Helsinki, Finland | – (h) | 3000 m s'chase | DNF |
| 1954 | Central American and Caribbean Games | Mexico City, Mexico | 7th (h) | 1500 m | 4:22.4 |
| 1954 | Central American and Caribbean Games | Mexico City, Mexico | 5th | 3000 m s'chase | 10:51.49 |
