= Juan Leiva (athlete) =

Venezuelan sprinter (1932–1983)

Personal information
- Full name: Juan Antonio Leiva Irigoyen
- Born: 17 July 1932 Maracaibo, Venezuela
- Died: 16 June 1983 (aged 50) Valencia, Venezuela

Sport
- Sport: Sprinting
- Event: 100 metres

Juan Antonio Leiva Irigoyen (17 July 1932 – 16 June 1983) was a Venezuelan sprinter. He competed in the men's 100 metres at the 1952 Summer Olympics.

== International competitions ==
Year	Competition	Venue	Position	Event	Notes
Representing Venezuela
1951	Pan American Games	Buenos Aires, Argentina	15th (h)	100 m	11.3
1951	Pan American Games	Buenos Aires, Argentina	10th (sf)	200 m	22.7
1951	Pan American Games	Buenos Aires, Argentina	11th (h)	110 m hurdles	16.0
1951	Bolivarian Games	Caracas, Venezuela	2nd	4 × 400 m relay	3:23.1
1952	Olympic Games	Helsinki, Finland	47th (h)	100 m	11.31
1952	Olympic Games	Helsinki, Finland	33rd (h)	200 m	22.38
1954	Central American and Caribbean Games	Mexico City, Mexico	5th	110 m hurdles	15.2
1954	Central American and Caribbean Games	Mexico City, Mexico	2nd	400 m hurdles	53.98
1954	Central American and Caribbean Games	Mexico City, Mexico	5th	4 × 400 m relay	3:20.2
1954	South American Championships	São Paulo, Brazil	11th (sf)	200 m	22.7
1954	South American Championships	São Paulo, Brazil	3rd	110 m hurdles	14.8 (w)
1954	South American Championships	São Paulo, Brazil	3rd	4 × 100 m relay	42.2
1954	South American Championships	São Paulo, Brazil	3rd	4 × 400 m relay	3:21.0
1955	Pan American Games	Mexico City, Mexico	5th	400 m hurdles	54.7
1955	Pan American Games	Mexico City, Mexico	2nd	4 × 100 m relay	41.36
1955	Pan American Games	Mexico City, Mexico	3rd	4 × 400 m relay	3:15.93
1959	Central American and Caribbean Games	Caracas, Venezuela	4th (h)	400 m hurdles	NT

== Personal bests ==
- 100 metres – 10.6h (1953)
