= Jaime Aparicio =

Colombian hurdler (1929–2026)

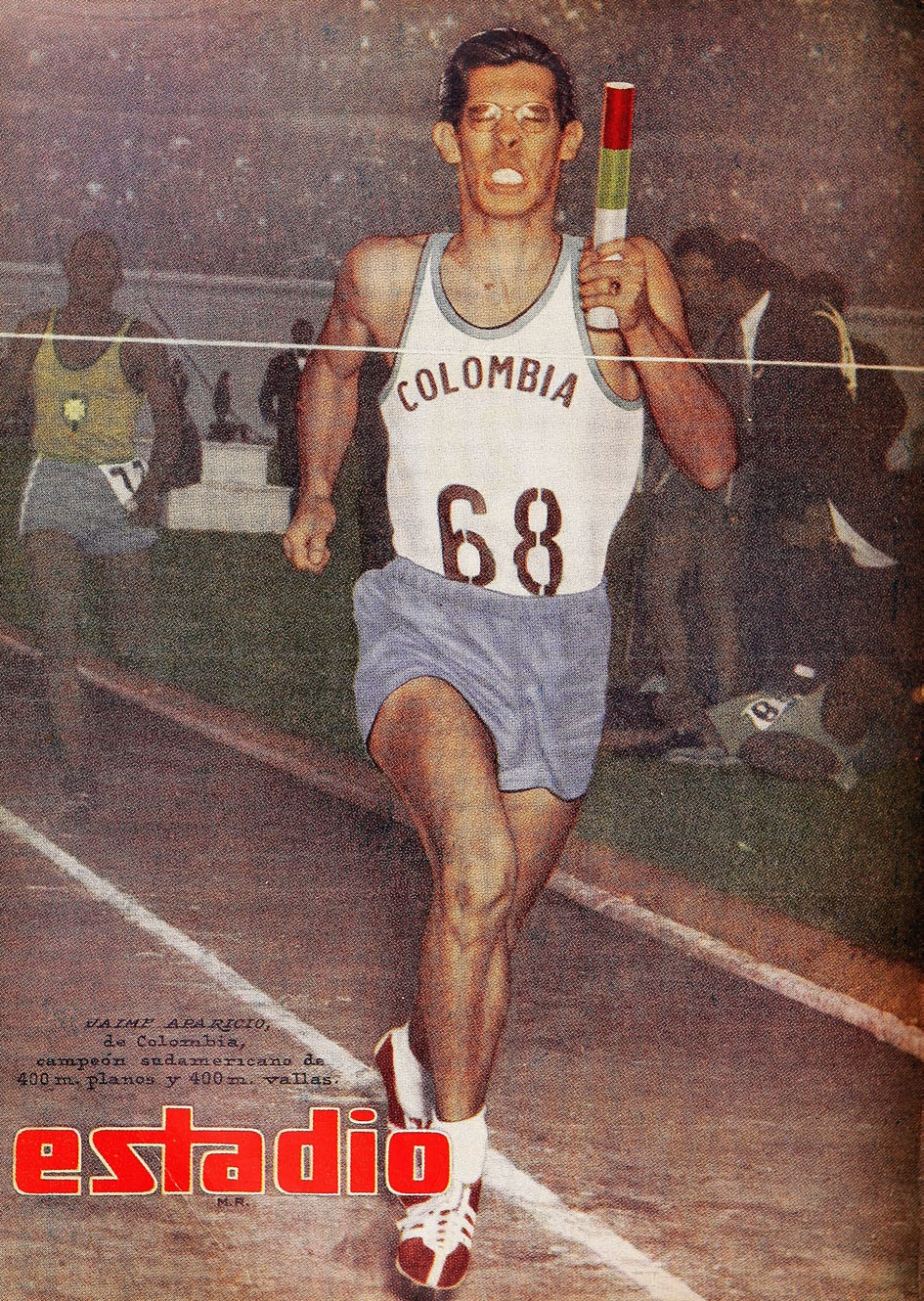
- Aparicio in 1956

Personal information
- Full name: Jaime Ignacio Aparicio Rodewaldt
- Born: 17 August 1929 Lima, Peru
- Died: 7 May 2026 (aged 96) Cali, Colombia
- Height: 170 cm (5 ft 7 in)
- Weight: 63 kg (139 lb)
Medal record
Athletics
Representing Colombia
Bolivarian Games
Gold medal – first place	1947/8 Lima	400 m hurdles
Gold medal – first place	1951 Caracas	400 m hurdles
Silver medal – second place	1947/8 Lima	400 m
Silver medal – second place	1951 Caracas	400 m

Jaime Ignacio Aparicio Rodewaldt (Note: In this Spanish name, the first or paternal surname is Aparicio and the second or maternal family name is Rodewaldt.) (17 August 1929 – 7 May 2026) was a Colombian hurdler who competed in the 1948 Summer Olympics and in the 1956 Summer Olympics. He was born in Lima on 17 August 1929, and died in Cali on 7 May 2026, at the age of 96.

== International competitions ==
Year	Competition	Venue	Position	Event	Notes
Representing Colombia
1947	Bolivarian Games	Lima, Peru	2nd	400 m	49.9
1947	Bolivarian Games	Lima, Peru	1st	400 m hurdles	55.9
1947	Bolivarian Games	Lima, Peru	3rd	4 × 400 m relay	3:27.7
1948	Olympic Games	London, United Kingdom	42nd (h)	400 m	51.4
1948	Olympic Games	London, United Kingdom	13th (h)	400 m hurdles	55.1
1950	Central American and Caribbean Games	Guatemala City, Guatemala	1st	400 m hurdles	54.9
1951	Pan American Games	Buenos Aires, Argentina	1st	400 m hurdles	53.4
1951	Pan American Games	Buenos Aires, Argentina	5th	4 × 100 m relay	42.8
1951	Bolivarian Games	Caracas, Venezuela	2nd	200 m	22.2
1951	Bolivarian Games	Caracas, Venezuela	1st	400 m hurdles	55.4
1951	Bolivarian Games	Caracas, Venezuela	3rd	4 × 100 m relay	43.0
1951	Bolivarian Games	Caracas, Venezuela	3rd	4 × 400 m relay	3:24.8
1954	Central American and Caribbean Games	Mexico City, Mexico	2nd	200 m	48.19
1954	Central American and Caribbean Games	Mexico City, Mexico	1st	400 m hurdles	53.35
1954	Central American and Caribbean Games	Mexico City, Mexico	6th	4 × 400 m relay	3:26.0
1954	South American Championships	São Paulo, Brazil	4th	100 m	10.7
1954	South American Championships	São Paulo, Brazil	2nd	200 m	21.7
1954	South American Championships	São Paulo, Brazil	1st	400 m hurdles	52.2
1955	Pan American Games	Mexico City, Mexico	2nd	400 m hurdles	51.8
1955	Pan American Games	Mexico City, Mexico	6th	4 × 400 m relay	3:20.08
1956	South American Championships	Santiago, Chile	2nd	200 m	21.7
1956	South American Championships	Santiago, Chile	1st	400 m	47.7
1956	South American Championships	Santiago, Chile	1st	400 m hurdles	52.0
1956	South American Championships	Santiago, Chile	1st	4 × 400 m relay	3:14.6
1956	Olympic Games	Melbourne, Australia	23rd (h)	400 m	49.14
1956	Olympic Games	Melbourne, Australia	9th (h)	400 m hurdles	52.14
1956	Olympic Games	Melbourne, Australia	14th (h)	4 × 400 m relay	3:27.4
1958	South American Championships	Montevideo, Uruguay	4th	400 m	49.5
1958	South American Championships	Montevideo, Uruguay	2nd	400 m hurdles	52.6

== Personal bests ==
- 400 metres – 47.6h (1955)
- 400 metres hurdles – 51.8h (1955)
