= Javier Souza =

Mexican sprinter

Personal information
- Nationality: Mexican
- Born: 13 November 1929 (age 96)

Sport
- Sport: Sprinting
- Event: 100 metres

Javier Souza Díaz (born 13 November 1929) is a Mexican sprinter. He competed in the men's 100 metres at the 1952 Summer Olympics.

== International competitions ==
Year	Competition	Venue	Position	Event	Notes
Representing Mexico
1951	Pan American Games	Buenos Aires, Argentina	5th (h)	100 m	NT
1951	Pan American Games	Buenos Aires, Argentina	6th (h)	400 m	50.6
1951	Pan American Games	Buenos Aires, Argentina	5th	4 × 400 m relay	NT
1952	Olympic Games	Helsinki, Finland	47th (h)	100 m	11.31
1952	Olympic Games	Helsinki, Finland	57th (h)	400 m	50.47
1954	Central American and Caribbean Games	Mexico City, Mexico	9th (sf)	100 m	10.9
1954	Central American and Caribbean Games	Mexico City, Mexico	6th	400 m	49.0
1954	Central American and Caribbean Games	Mexico City, Mexico	3rd	4 × 100 m relay	42.04
1954	Central American and Caribbean Games	Mexico City, Mexico	4th	4 × 400 m relay	3:18.7
1955	Pan American Games	Mexico City, Mexico	17th (h)	100 m	11.28
1955	Pan American Games	Mexico City, Mexico	3rd	4 × 100 m relay	41.94

== Personal bests ==
- 100 metres – 10.6h (1952)
- 400 metres – 48.9h (1952)
