= Fernando Salinas =

Bolivian footballer (born 1960)

Personal information
- Date of birth: 18 May 1960 (age 66)
- Place of birth: Tarija, Bolivia

International career
Years	Team	Apps	(Gls)
1983–1989	Bolivia	12	(1)

Fernando Salinas (born 18 May 1960) is a Bolivian footballer. He played in twelve matches for the Bolivia national football team from 1983 to 1989. He was also part of Bolivia's squad for the 1983 Copa América tournament.
