= Dick Harding =

Canadian sprinter (1934–2007)

Personal information
- Born: 9 February 1934 Chatham, Ontario, Canada
- Died: 8 February 2007 (aged 72)

Sport
- Sport: Sprinting
- Event: 100 metres

Richard Revell Harding (9 February 1934 – 8 February 2007) was a Canadian sprinter. He competed in the men's 100 metres at the 1956 Summer Olympics. Harding competed in the 440 yards at the 1954 British Empire and Commonwealth Games, failing to progress past the heats.
