= Charles Thomas (sprinter) =

American sprinter

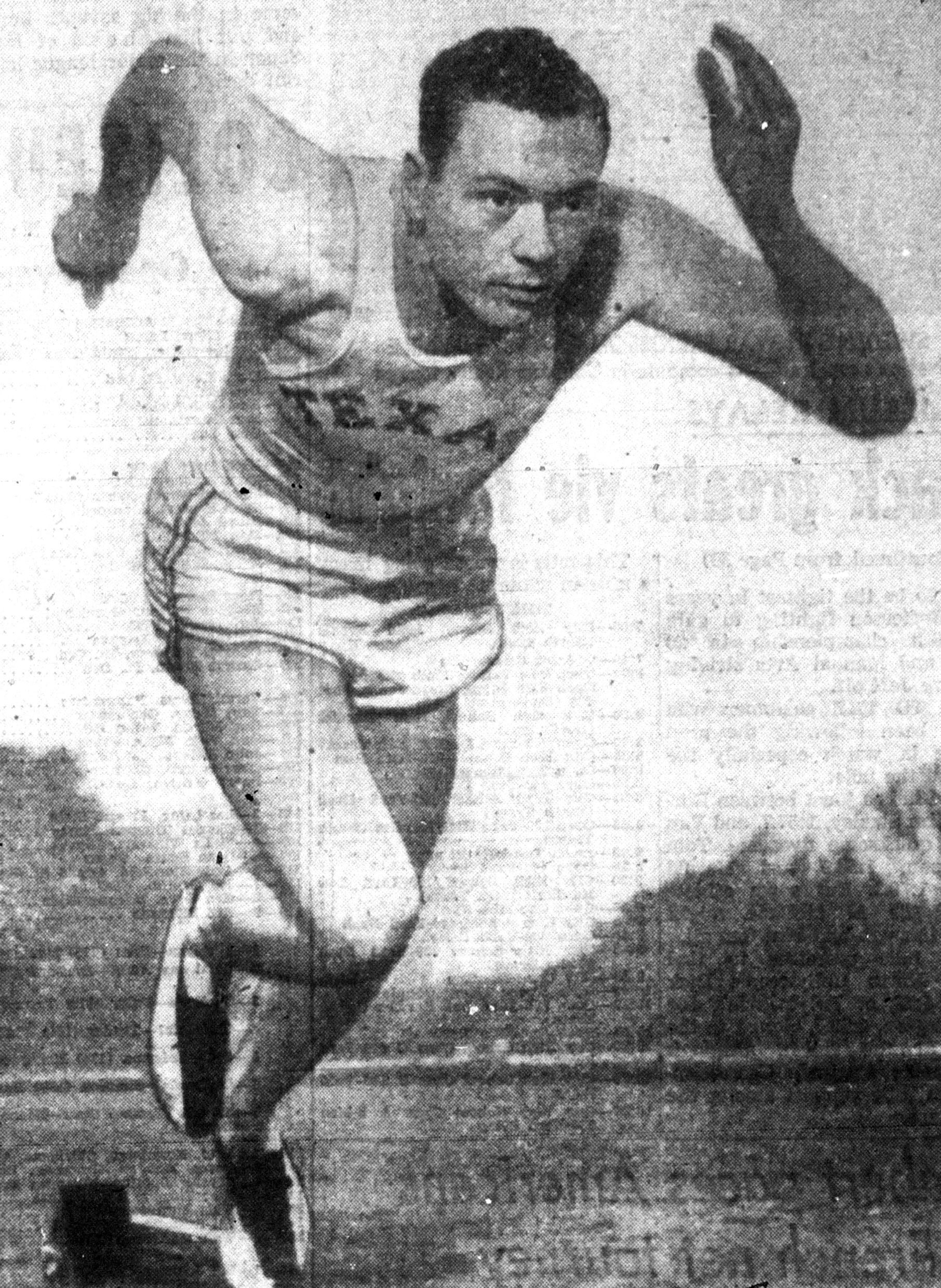
Thomas, circa 1954

Charles Augusta Thomas (October 3, 1931 – January 26, 2015) was an American sprinter and athletics coach. He was born in Fostoria, Texas, and died in Bryan, Texas.

Competing for the Texas Longhorns men's track and field team, Thomas won the 1954 NCAA Track and Field Championships in the 220 yards. In college, he never lost a race at the 220 yards distance.
