= José da Conceição =

Brazilian athletics competitor (1931–1974)

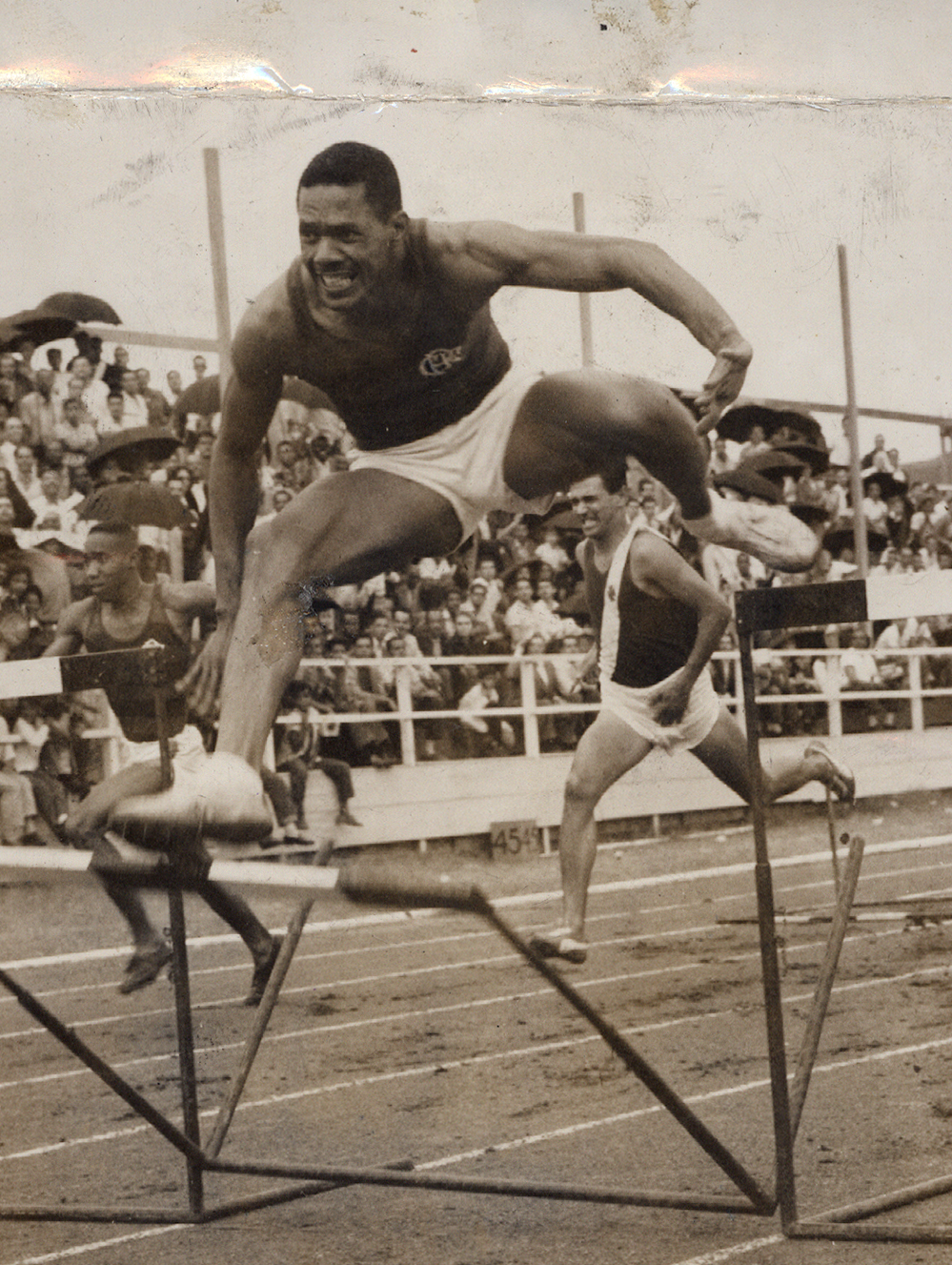
- José Teles da Conceição in 1960

Medal record

Men's Athletics

Representing Brazil

Olympic Games
Bronze medal – third place	1952 Helsinki	High jump

Pan American Games
Bronze medal – third place	1955 Mexico City	200 m
Bronze medal – third place	1955 Mexico City	High jump

Ibero-American Games
Silver medal – second place	1960 Santiago	200 m
Silver medal – second place	1960 Santiago	110 m hurdles
Silver medal – second place	1960 Santiago	4x100 m relay

José Telles da Conceição (23 May 1931 – 18 October 1974) was a Brazilian athlete who competed mainly in the high jump but also in sprinting events.

He competed for Brazil in the 1952 Summer Olympics held in Helsinki, Finland in the high jump where he won the bronze medal.

He competed in the 1956 Summer Olympics in 200 meters finishing sixth in the final.

In 1974 he was murdered in Rio de Janeiro.

== International competitions ==
Year	Competition	Venue	Position	Event	Notes
Representing Brazil
1952	South American Championships	Buenos Aires, Argentina	3rd	100 m	10.8
1952	South American Championships	Buenos Aires, Argentina	1st	High jump	1.90 m
1953	South American Championships (unofficial)	Santiago, Chile	1st	4 × 100 m relay	41.7
1953	South American Championships (unofficial)	Santiago, Chile	1st	High jump	1.93 m
1954	South American Championships	São Paulo, Brazil	2nd	100 m	10.7
1954	South American Championships	São Paulo, Brazil	1st	200 m	21.2
1954	South American Championships	São Paulo, Brazil	1st	4 × 100 m relay	40.8
1954	South American Championships	São Paulo, Brazil	1st	High jump	2.00 m
1955	Pan American Games	Mexico City, Mexico	8th (sf)	100 m	10.76
1955	Pan American Games	Mexico City, Mexico	3rd	200 m	21.66
1955	Pan American Games	Mexico City, Mexico	5th	4 × 400 m relay	3:16.71
1955	Pan American Games	Mexico City, Mexico	3rd	High jump	1.91 m
1956	Olympic Games	Melbourne, Australia	6th	200 m	21.56
1956	Olympic Games	Melbourne, Australia	12th (sf)	4 × 100 m relay	43.8
1956	Olympic Games	Melbourne, Australia	21st	High jump	1.86 m
1957	South American Championships (unofficial)	Santiago, Chile	1st	4 × 100 m relay	41.4
1957	South American Championships (unofficial)	Santiago, Chile	3rd	High jump	1.85 m
1958	South American Championships	Montevideo, Uruguay	1st	100 m	10.5
1958	South American Championships	Montevideo, Uruguay	1st	200 m	21.6
1958	South American Championships	Montevideo, Uruguay	1st	4 × 100 m relay	41.3
1958	South American Championships	Montevideo, Uruguay	1st	High jump	1.90 m
1959	South American Championships (unofficial)	São Paulo, Brazil	1st	100 m	10.5
1959	South American Championships (unofficial)	São Paulo, Brazil	1st	200 m	21.4
1959	South American Championships (unofficial)	São Paulo, Brazil	1st	4 × 100 m relay	41.2
1959	South American Championships (unofficial)	São Paulo, Brazil	6th	High jump	1.75 m
1959	Pan American Games	Chicago, United States	12th (sf)	100 m	10.7
1959	Pan American Games	Chicago, United States	10th (h)	200 m	22.0^{1}
1959	Pan American Games	Chicago, United States	4th	4 × 100 m relay	41.6
1960	Olympic Games	Rome, Italy	21st (qf)	200 m	21.5
1960	Ibero-American Games	Santiago, Chile	2nd	200 m	21.5
1960	Ibero-American Games	Santiago, Chile	2nd	110 m hurdles	14.3
1960	Ibero-American Games	Santiago, Chile	2nd	4 × 100 m relay	40.6
1960	Ibero-American Games	Santiago, Chile	8th	Long jump	6.97 m
1961	South American Championships	Lima, Peru	3rd	100 m	10.7
1961	South American Championships	Lima, Peru	5th	200 m	22.1
1961	South American Championships	Lima, Peru	2nd	110 m hurdles	14.7
1961	South American Championships	Lima, Peru	2nd	4 × 100 m relay	41.5
1962	Ibero-American Games	Madrid, Spain	1st	110 m hurdles	14.7
1962	Ibero-American Games	Madrid, Spain	1st	4 × 100 m relay	41.2
1962	Ibero-American Games	Madrid, Spain	3rd	4 × 400 m relay	3:16.5
1963	Pan American Games	São Paulo, Brazil	7th (h)	110 m hurdles	14.61^{2}
1963	South American Championships	Cali, Colombia	2nd	110 m hurdles	15.2
1963	South American Championships	Cali, Colombia	1st	4 × 100 m relay	40.9
1965	South American Championships	Rio de Janeiro, Brazil	1st	4 × 100 m relay	41.2
1965	South American Championships	Rio de Janeiro, Brazil	2nd	Long jump	7.06 m

^{1}Did not start in the semifinals
^{2}Did not start in the final
