= Rafael Fortún =

Cuban sprinter

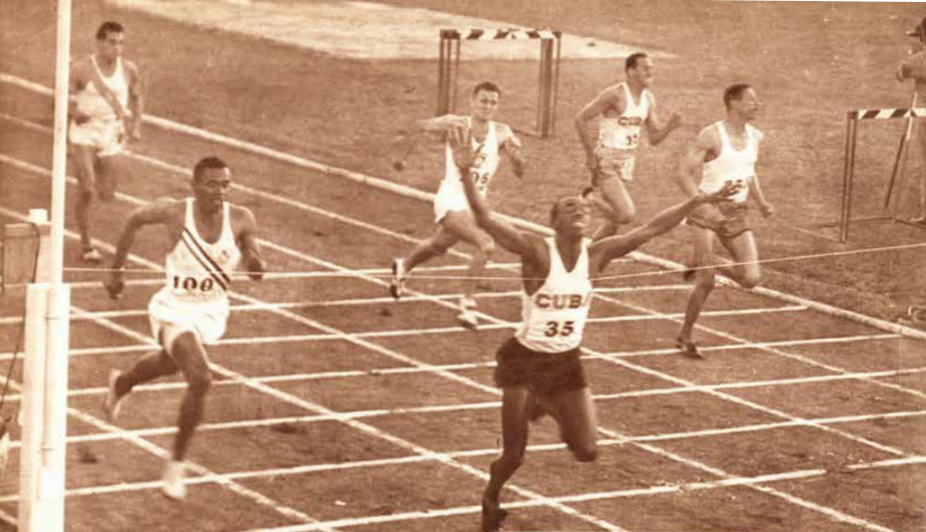
Rafael Fortún winning the 200m race at the 1951 Pan American Games

Rafael Emilio Fortún Chacón (born August 5, 1919, in Camagüey – died June 22, 1982, in Camagüey) was a male sprinter from Cuba, who twice competed for his native country at the Summer Olympics: 1948 and 1952. His major sporting achievement was winning the 100 and 200 m double at the 1951 Pan American Games, beating American sprinter Art Bragg in both events.

Fortun was ranked by the experts of Track and Field News at 100 m as 10th in the world in 1950 and 5th in 1951.

Fortun was a very successful competitor at the Central American and Caribbean Games. He won the 100 m three times in a row (1946, 1950 and 1954) - the first competitor to achieve such a feat. He also won the 200 m once (in 1946) and was second once (in 1950).

Fortun came from a very humble background in the Cuban province of Camaguey. Originally he was a high jumper but moved to the sprints when he realised his talent for them. He also played baseball, a traditional sporting route out of poverty in Cuba at the time. Fortun had to train barefoot until a gift of sporting shoes was made by a local priest. His athletic talent was not appreciated by the authorities in Cuba at the time. He had to seek gifts of money to enable him to attend the Olympic Games of 1948 and 1952 and was fired from his job at the Ministry of Public Affairs for attending the 1951 Pan American Games.

Fortun died of cancer in 1982.

Today his achievements are appreciated more in Cuba, his memory is honoured, for example, in an athletics competition in his home province of Camaguey: the Rafael Fortun Memorial competition in Camaguey City.

== International competitions ==
| Year | Competition | Venue | Position | Event | Notes |
Representing Cuba
| 1946 | Central American and Caribbean Games | Barranquilla, Colombia | 1st | 100 m | 10.4 |
| 1946 | Central American and Caribbean Games | Barranquilla, Colombia | 1st | 200 m | 21.6 |
| 1946 | Central American and Caribbean Games | Barranquilla, Colombia | 2nd | 4 × 100 m relay | 43.1 |
| 1948 | Olympic Games | London, United Kingdom | 8th (sf) | 100 m | 10.82 |
| 1948 | Olympic Games | London, United Kingdom | 12th (sf) | 200 m | 22.51 |
| 1950 | Central American and Caribbean Games | Guatemala City, Guatemala | 1st | 100 m | 10.3 (w) |
| 1950 | Central American and Caribbean Games | Guatemala City, Guatemala | 2nd | 200 m | 21.2 (w) |
| 1950 | Central American and Caribbean Games | Guatemala City, Guatemala | 1st | 4 × 100 m relay | 41.5 |
| 1951 | Pan American Games | Buenos Aires, Argentina | 1st | 100 m | 10.6 |
| 1951 | Pan American Games | Buenos Aires, Argentina | 1st | 200 m | 21.3 |
| 1951 | Pan American Games | Buenos Aires, Argentina | 2nd | 4 × 100 m relay | 41.2 |
| 1952 | Olympic Games | Helsinki, Finland | 7th (sf) | 100 m | 10.92 |
| 1952 | Olympic Games | Helsinki, Finland | 8th (sf) | 200 m | 21.93 |
| 1952 | Olympic Games | Helsinki, Finland | 8th (sf) | 4 × 100 m relay | 41.67 |
| 1954 | Central American and Caribbean Games | Mexico City, Mexico | 1st | 100 m | 10.58 |
| 1954 | Central American and Caribbean Games | Mexico City, Mexico | 2nd | 4 × 100 m relay | 41.56 |
| 1955 | Pan American Games | Mexico City, Mexico | 5th | 100 m | 10.6 |
| 1955 | Pan American Games | Mexico City, Mexico | 7th | 4 × 100 m relay | NT |

== Personal bests ==
- 100 metres – 10.58 (1954)
- 200 metres – 21.1h (1951)
