= Rod Richard =

American sprinter

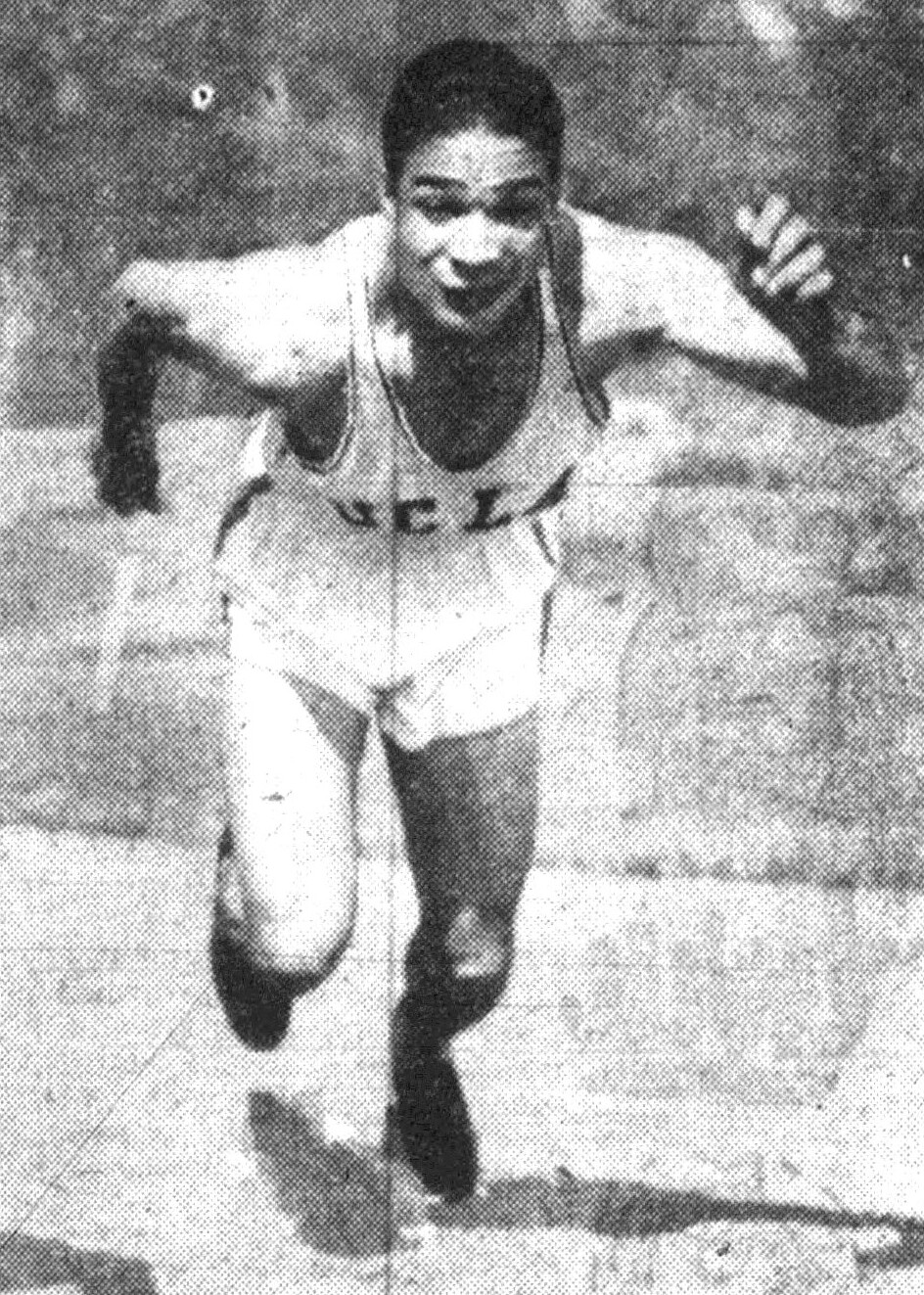
- Richard, circa 1951

Personal information
- Born: 8 February 1932 (age 94)
Medal record
Men's Athletics
Representing the United States
Pan American Games
Gold medal – first place	1955 Mexico City	100 metres
Gold medal – first place	1955 Mexico City	200 metres
Gold medal – first place	1955 Mexico City	4×100 metres

Rodney ("Rod") Richard (born 8 February 1932) is an American athlete who competed in the 1955 Pan American Games.

At the 1955 Pan American Games, he won the gold medal in the 100 metre event as well as in the 200 metre competition. He was also a member of the American relay team which won the gold medal in the 4×100 metre contest.

In 1956, he failed to qualify for the Olympics after finishing seventh in the 100 metre event as well as in the 200 metre competition at the USA Olympic Trials in Los Angeles.

Richard was an All-American sprinter for the UCLA Bruins track and field team, finishing runner-up in the 200 m at the 1953 NCAA track and field championships.
