= Athletics at the 1954 Central American and Caribbean Games =

Athletics at the VII CAC Games
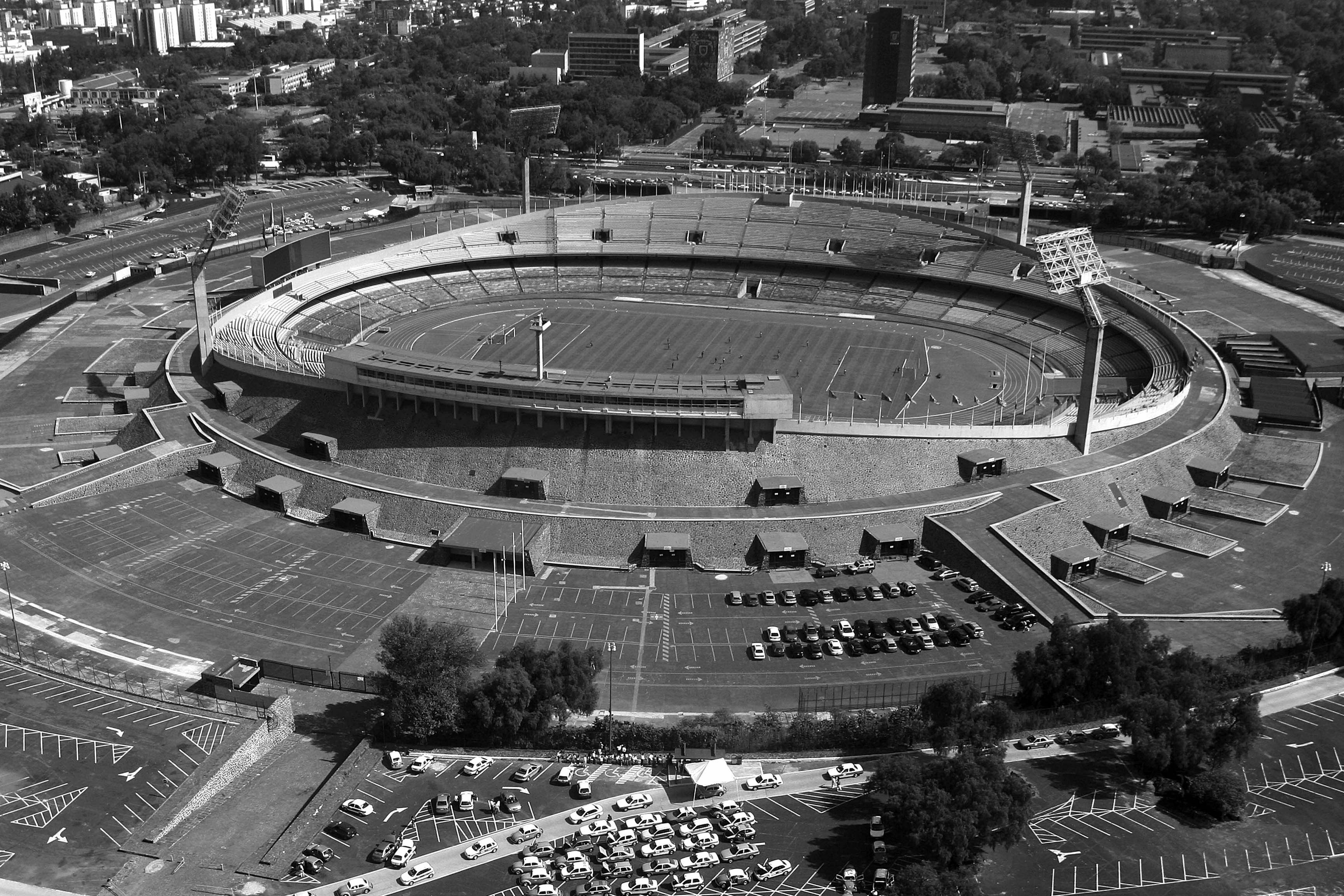
- The host stadium
- Dates: 7–12 March 1954
- Host city: Mexico City, Mexico
- Venue: Estadio Olímpico Universitario
- Events: 28
- Participation: 225 athletes from 11 nations

The athletics competition in the 1954 Central American and Caribbean Games were held at the Estadio Olímpico Universitario in Mexico City, Mexico between 7 and 12 March.

It was the first time that men's 3000 metres steeplechase was contested at the Games.

== Medal summary ==
=== Men's events ===
| Event | Gold | | Silver | | Bronze | |
|---|---|---|---|---|---|---|
| 100 metres | Rafael Fortún; Cuba | 10.58A | Les Laing; Jamaica | 10.66A | Raúl Mazorra; Cuba | 10.80A |
| 200 metres | Les Laing; Jamaica | 21.66A | Jaime Aparicio; Colombia | 21.84A | Martin Francis; Panama | 21.90A |
| 400 metres | Angel García; Cuba | 48.02A | George Rhoden; Jamaica | 48.19A | Ovidio de Jesús; Puerto Rico | 48.27A |
| 800 metres | Frank Prince; Panama | 1:54.47A GR | George Rhoden; Jamaica | 1:55.00A | Eric Waldrom; Panama | 1:57.74A |
| 1500 metres | Frank Prince; Panama | 4:16.65A | Heliodoro Martínez; Mexico | 4:16.81A | Filemón Camacho; Venezuela | 4:17.71A |
| 5000 metres | Doroteo Flores; Guatemala | 15:57.30A | Eligio Galicia; Mexico | 16:04.52A | Francisco Hernández; Mexico | 16:07.04A |
| 10,000 metres | Cruz Serrano; Mexico | 32:59.63A GR | Doroteo Flores; Guatemala | 33:52.80A | Francisco Hernández; Mexico | 34:00.19A |
| Half marathon | Doroteo Flores; Guatemala | 1:15:20A | Gustavo Ramírez; Colombia | 1:19:00A | Guillermo Rojas; Guatemala | 1:19:01A |
| 110 metres hurdles | Samuel Anderson; Cuba | 14.3A GR | Keith Gardner; Jamaica | 14.5A | Teófilo Davis Bell; Venezuela | 15.2A |
| 400 metres hurdles | Jaime Aparicio; Colombia | 53.35A GR | Juan Leiva; Venezuela | 53.98A | Amadeo Francis; Puerto Rico | 54.28A |
| 3000 metre steeplechase | Eligio Galicia; Mexico | 10:22.38A GR | Víctorio Solares; Guatemala | 10:51.49A | José Grenados; Mexico | 11:00.80A |
| 4 × 100 m relay | Jamaica; Byron LaBeach; George Rhoden; Keith Gardner; Leslie Laing | 41.06A (40.9) GR | Cuba; Israel Mestre; Raúl Mazorra; Manuel Peñalver; Rafael Fortún | 41.56A (41.3) | Mexico; Javier de la Torre; José Manuel Abascal; Javier Souza; Sergio Higuera | 42.04A (41.9) |
| 4 × 400 m relay | Jamaica; Leslie Laing; Byron LaBeach; Keith Gardner; George Rhoden | 3:12.25A (3:12.0) GR | Puerto Rico; Amadeo Francis; Ismael Delgado; Frank Rivera; Ovidio de Jesús | 3:17.70A (3:17.4) | Cuba; Ángel García; Evelio Planas; Armando Vázquez; Emilio Pestana | 3:17.83A (3:17.7) |
| High jump | Roberto López; Cuba | 1.87A | Gaspar Vigo; Puerto Rico | 1.87A | Manuel Gómez; Venezuela | 1.85A |
| Pole vault | José Barbosa; Puerto Rico | 4.05A | Jorge Aguilera; Mexico | 3.90A | Brígido Iriarte; Venezuela | 3.90A |
| Long jump | Claudio Cabrejas; Cuba | 7.46A GR | Víctor Hernández; Cuba | 7.16A | Keith Gardner; Jamaica | 7.02A |
| Triple jump | Víctor Hernández; Cuba | 14.86A GR | Claudio Cabrejas; Cuba | 14.51A | Gilberto Rondón; Puerto Rico | 14.18A |
| Shot put | Ramón Rosario; Puerto Rico | 14.46A GR | Eduardo Adriana; Netherlands Antilles | 14.45A | Rafael Trompiz; Venezuela | 14.38A |
| Discus throw | Mauricio Rodríguez; Venezuela | 40.14A | Alfonso Cruz; Mexico | 39.00A | Heriberto Alonso; Cuba | 38.87A |
| Hammer throw | Luis Betancourt; Cuba | 46.96A GR | Jaime Annexy; Puerto Rico | 46.82A | Enrique Lagoyete; Colombia | 45.19A |
| Javelin throw | Reinaldo Oliver; Puerto Rico | 67.71A GR | Carlos Fajer; Mexico | 61.79A | Guillermo Pasalacqua; Puerto Rico | 54.97A |
| Pentathlon | Brígido Iriarte; Venezuela | 2748A | Héctor Román; Puerto Rico | 2597A | Reinaldo Oliver; Puerto Rico | 2494A |

=== Women's events ===
| Event | Gold | | Silver | | Bronze | |
|---|---|---|---|---|---|---|
| 100 metres | Carlota Gooden; Panama | 12.32A | Hyacinth Walters; Jamaica | 12.34A | Bertha Díaz; Cuba | 12.52A |
| 80 metres hurdles | Amalia Yubi; Mexico | 12.3A | Kathleen Russell; Jamaica | 12.5A | Gloria Tait; Panama | 13.0A |
| 4 × 100 m relay | Panama; Dolores Worrell; María Bell; Gloria Tait; Carlota Gooden | 47.49A (47.3) GR | Jamaica; Kathleen Russell; Kathleen Robotham; Cynthia Thompson; Hyacinth Walters | 48.34A (48.2) | Cuba; Nereida Borges; Vilma Santos; Belkis Rodríguez; Berta Díaz | 48.81A (48.7) |
| High jump | Kathleen Russell; Jamaica | 1.50A | Kathleen Robotham; Jamaica | 1.47A | Sheila Leyva; Venezuela | 1.42A |
| Discus throw | Alejandrina Herrera; Cuba | 37.18A GR | Lili Schluter; Mexico | 36.04A | Concepción Villanueva; Mexico | 35.51A |
| Javelin throw | Ana Mercedes Campos; El Salvador | 38.82A GR | Berta Chiú; Mexico | 38.43A | Amalia Yubi; Mexico | 37.45A |

== Medal table ==
| Rank | Nation | Gold | Silver | Bronze | Total |
|---|---|---|---|---|---|
| 1 | Cuba (CUB) | 8 | 3 | 5 | 16 |
| 2 | Jamaica (JAM) | 4 | 8 | 1 | 13 |
| 3 | Panama (PAN) | 4 | 0 | 3 | 7 |
| 4 | Mexico (MEX) | 3 | 7 | 6 | 16 |
| 5 | Puerto Rico (PUR) | 3 | 4 | 5 | 12 |
| 6 | Guatemala (GUA) | 2 | 2 | 1 | 5 |
| 7 | Venezuela (VEN) | 2 | 1 | 6 | 9 |
| 8 | Colombia (COL) | 1 | 2 | 1 | 4 |
| 9 | El Salvador (SLV) | 1 | 0 | 0 | 1 |
| 10 | Netherlands Antilles (AHO) | 0 | 1 | 0 | 1 |
| Totals (10 entries) | | 28 | 28 | 28 | 84 |

== Participating nations ==
- Colombia (22)
- Cuba (36)
- Dominican Republic (9)
- Guatemala (17)
- Jamaica (10)
- Mexico (55)
- Netherlands Antilles (1)
- Panama (14)
- Puerto Rico (36)
- El Salvador (7)
- Venezuela (18)
