= List of Central American and Caribbean Games medalists in athletics =

This is the complete list of Central American and Caribbean Games medalists in athletics from 1926 to 2018. Women's events have been held since 1938.

== Men's medalists ==
=== 100 metres ===
Games	Gold	Silver	Bronze
1926	Mariano Aguilar (MEX)	Francisco Ramírez (MEX)	Mario González (CUB)
1930	Alberto Torriento (CUB)	Gustavo Alfonso (CUB)	Reginald Beckford (PAN)
1935	Conrado Rodríguez (CUB)	José Costa (CUB)	Reginald Beckford (PAN)
1938	Jennings Blackett (PAN)	Jacinto Ortiz (CUB)	Eulalio Villodas (PUR)
1946	Rafael Fortún (CUB)	Herb McKenley (JAM)	McDonald Bailey (TRI)
1950	Rafael Fortún (CUB)	Herb McKenley (JAM)	Lloyd La Beach (PAN)
1954	Rafael Fortún (CUB)	Leslie Laing (JAM)	Raúl Mazorra (CUB)
1959	Manuel Rivera (PUR)	Horacio Esteves (VEN)	Lloyd Murad (VEN)
1962	Tom Robinson (BAH)	Rafael Romero (VEN)	Arquímedes Herrera (VEN)
1966	Enrique Figuerola (CUB)	Edwin Roberts (TRI)	Carl Plaskett (ISV)
1970	Pablo Montes (CUB)	Hermes Ramírez (CUB)	Michael Fray (JAM)
1974	Silvio Leonard (CUB)	José Triana (CUB)	Pablo Montes (CUB)
1978	Silvio Leonard (CUB)	Osvaldo Lara (CUB)	Guy Abrahams (PAN)
1982	Leandro Peñalver (CUB)	Osvaldo Lara (CUB)	Juan Núñez (DOM)
1986	Andrés Simón (CUB)	Juan Núñez (DOM)	Ray Stewart (JAM)
1990	Joel Isasi (CUB)	Jorge Aguilera (CUB)	Wayne Watson (JAM)
1993	Joel Isasi (CUB)	Andrés Simón (CUB)	Patrick Delice (TRI)
1998	Obadele Thompson (BAR)	Dwight Ferguson (BAH)	Luis Pérez (CUB)
2002	Dion Crabbe (IVB)	Jesús Carrión (PUR)	Rolando Blanco (GUA)
2006	Churandy Martina (AHO)	Derrick Atkins (BAH)	Jacey Harper (TRI)
2010	Churandy Martina (AHO)	Daniel Bailey (ATG)	Lerone Clarke (JAM)
2014	Rolando Palacios (HON)	Levi Cadogan (BAR)	Yaniel Carrero (CUB)
2018	Nesta Carter (JAM)	Jason Rogers (SKN)	Cejhae Greene (ATG)
2023	Emanuel Archibald (GUY)	José González (DOM)	Rikkoi Brathwaite (BVI)

=== 200 metres ===
Games	Gold		Silver		Bronze	
1926	Mario Gómez; Mexico	22.2A	Pepe Barrientos; Cuba		Francisco Arango; Cuba	
1930	Reginald Beckford; Panama	22.2	Eugenio Guerra; Puerto Rico		Mario Gómez; Mexico	
1935	Conrado Rodríguez; Cuba	22.0	Norberto Verrier; Cuba		Luciano Flores; Cuba	
1938	Jacinto Ortiz; Cuba	21.7	Eulalio Villodas; Puerto Rico	21.8e	Arthur Jones; Jamaica	22.0e
1946	Rafael Fortún; Cuba	21.6	Lloyd La Beach; Panama	21.7	Herb McKenley; Jamaica	21.7
1950	Herb McKenley; Jamaica	20.9Aw	Rafael Fortún; Cuba	21.2Aw	Lloyd La Beach; Panama	21.2Aw
1954	Leslie Laing; Jamaica	21.66A	Jaime Aparicio; Colombia	21.84A	Martin Francis; Panama	21.90A
1959	Manuel Rivera; Puerto Rico	21.79	Rafael Romero; Venezuela	21.92	Lloyd Murad; Venezuela	22.40
1962	Rafael Romero; Venezuela	21.0	Arquímedes Herrera; Venezuela	21.3	Edwin Roberts; Trinidad and Tobago	21.4
1966	Edwin Roberts; Trinidad and Tobago	20.8 /20.70?	Carl Plaskett; U.S. Virgin Islands	21.4 /21.21?	Enrique Figuerola; Cuba	21.5 /21.24?
1970	Pablo Montes; Cuba	21.20	Germán Solís; Cuba	21.30	Hermes Ramírez; Cuba	21.40
1974	Silvio Leonard; Cuba	20.99	Pablo Bandomo; Cuba	21.37	José Triana; Cuba	21.54
1978	Silvio Leonard; Cuba	20.49	Anthony Husbands; Trinidad and Tobago	21.00	Guy Abrahams; Panama	21.15
1982	Leandro Peñalver; Cuba	20.42	Osvaldo Lara; Cuba	20.94	Juan Núñez; Dominican Republic	21.04
1986	Leandro Peñalver; Cuba	20.70	Juan Núñez; Dominican Republic	20.79	Leroy Reid; Jamaica	20.9
1990	Roberto Hernández; Cuba	20.72A	Edgardo Guilbe; Puerto Rico	20.79A	Junior Cornette; Guyana	21.22A
1993	Andrew Tynes; Bahamas	20.64	Iván García; Cuba	20.71	Jorge Aguilera; Cuba	20.91
1998	Juan Pedro Toledo; Mexico	20.46	Misael Ortíz; Cuba	20.75	Iván García; Cuba	20.81
2002	Juan Pedro Toledo; Mexico	20.97	Christopher Williams; Jamaica	21.04	José Carabalí; Venezuela	21.13
2006	Xavier Brown; Jamaica	20.74	Hawar Murillo; Colombia	20.78	Andrew Hinds; Barbados	20.83
2010	Churandy Martina; Netherlands Antilles	20.25 GR	Rasheed Dwyer; Jamaica	20.49 PB	Rondel Sorrillo; Trinidad and Tobago	20.59
2014	Roberto Skyers; Cuba	20.47	Reynier Mena; Cuba	20.54	José Carlos Herrera; Mexico	20.63
2018	Bernardo Baloyes; Colombia	20.13	Alonso Edward; Panama	20.17	Kyle Greaux; Trinidad and Tobago	20.26

=== 400 metres ===
Games	Gold		Silver		Bronze	
1926	Lucílo Iturbe; Mexico	49.9A	Luis Estévez; Cuba		José Moraila; Mexico	
1930	Reginald Beckford; Panama	49.6	José Moraila; Mexico		Lucílo Iturbe; Mexico	
1935	Carlos de Anda; Mexico	49.3	Horacio Gómez; Cuba		Antonio Quesada; Mexico	
1938	Arturo Baker; Panama	49.7	Adolfo Curiel; Mexico		Gilberto Castruita; Mexico	
1946	Arthur Wint; Jamaica	48.0	Herb McKenley; Jamaica	48.5	George Rhoden; Jamaica	49.3
1950	Herb McKenley; Jamaica	47.8A	George Rhoden; Jamaica	48.3A	Cirilo McSween; Panama	49.3A
1954	Angel García; Cuba	48.02A	George Rhoden; Jamaica	48.19A	Ovidio de Jesús; Puerto Rico	48.27A
1959	Ovidio de Jesús; Puerto Rico	48.73	Iván Rodríguez; Puerto Rico	48.93	Evaristo Edie; Venezuela	49.98
1962	George Kerr; Jamaica	45.9	Hortensio Fucil; Venezuela	47.3	Malcolm Spence; Jamaica	47.4
1966	Juan Franceschi; Puerto Rico	46.7 /46.77?	Rupert Hoilette; Jamaica	46.9 /47.03?	Rodobaldo Díaz; Cuba	47.0 /47.10?
1970	Antonio Álvarez; Cuba	46.6	Melesio Piña; Mexico	46.9	Misael Curiel; Venezuela	47.1
1974	Alberto Juantorena; Cuba	45.52	Seymour Newman; Jamaica	46.34	Iván Mangual; Puerto Rico	46.42
1978	Alberto Juantorena; Cuba	44.27	Joseph Coombs; Trinidad and Tobago	45.41	Seymour Newman; Jamaica	46.11
1982	Bert Cameron; Jamaica	45.10	Agustín Pavó; Cuba	45.87	Carlos Reyté; Cuba	46.34
1986	Félix Stevens; Cuba	44.98	Ian Morris; Trinidad and Tobago	45.02	Elvis Forde; Barbados	45.65
1990	Roberto Hernández; Cuba	44.84A	Alvin Daniel; Trinidad and Tobago	45.58A	Howard Burnett; Jamaica	45.86A
1993	Norberto Téllez; Cuba	45.80	Neil de Silva; Trinidad and Tobago	46.07	Omar Meña; Cuba	46.32
1998	Troy McIntosh; Bahamas	44.84	Roxbert Martin; Jamaica	45.11	Alejandro Cárdenas; Mexico	45.22
2002	Carlos Santa; Dominican Republic	45.83	Lansford Spence; Jamaica	46.31	Juan Pedro Toledo; Mexico	46.79
2006	Yeimer López; Cuba	45.28	Alleyne Francique; Grenada	45.44	Arismendy Peguero; Dominican Republic	45.55
2010	Nery Brenes; Costa Rica	44.84 NR PB	Tabarie Henry; U.S. Virgin Islands	45.07	Allodin Fothergill; Jamaica	45.24 PB
2014	Raidel Acea; Cuba	45.36	Yoandys Lescay; Cuba	45.56	Alberth Bravo; Venezuela	45.82
2018	Luguelín Santos; Dominican Republic	44.59 SB	Yoandys Lescay; Cuba	45.38 SB	Nery Brenes; Costa Rica	45.61

=== 800 metres ===
Games	Gold		Silver		Bronze	
1926	Lucílo Iturbe; Mexico	2:01.4A	Modesto Careaga; Mexico		Darío Álvarez; Cuba	
1930	Darío Álvarez; Cuba	2:00.6	Lucílo Iturbe; Mexico		Juan Gutsens; Cuba	
1935	Alfredo Mariscal; Mexico	2:00.9	Luis Vázquez; Cuba		Miguel Vasconcelos; Mexico	
1938	Arthur Wint; Jamaica	1:56.3	Alfredo Mariscal; Mexico	1:56.6e	Pedro Zúñiga; Mexico	1:56.7e
1946	Arthur Wint; Jamaica	1:54.8	Wilfred Tull; Trinidad and Tobago	1:56.4	Ken Hyland; Trinidad and Tobago	1:57.6
1950	George Rhoden; Jamaica	1:59.4A	Frank Prince; Panama	1:59.5A	Frank Rivera; Puerto Rico	2:01.1A
1954	Frank Prince; Panama	1:54.47A	George Rhoden; Jamaica	1:55.00A	Eric Waldrom; Panama	1:57.74A
1959	Ralph Gomes; British Guiana	1:57.7	Harvey Borrero; Colombia	1:58.4	Jorge Leal; Mexico	1:58.8
1962	George Kerr; Jamaica	1:51.0	Mel Spence; Jamaica	1:53.0	José Neira; Colombia	1:54.8
1966	Neville Myton; Jamaica	1:50.2	Lennox Yearwood; Trinidad and Tobago	1:51.7	Ben Cayenne; Trinidad and Tobago	1:54.3
1970	Herminio Isaac; Puerto Rico	1:49.8	Ricardo Bailey; Panama	1:49.9	Donaldo Arza; Panama	1:50.3
1974	Leandro Civil; Cuba	1:48.43	Luis Medina; Cuba	1:48.68	Héctor López; Venezuela	1:48.99
1978	Alberto Juantorena; Cuba	1:47.23	Gerold Pawirodikromo; Suriname	1:47.46	Leandro Civil; Cuba	1:47.66
1982	Alberto Juantorena; Cuba	1:45.15	William Wuycke; Venezuela	1:45.75	Bárbaro Serrano; Cuba	1:46.66
1986	Oslen Barr; Guyana	1:49.42	William Wuycke; Venezuela	1:49.45	Ángel Osoria; Cuba	1:50.35
1990	Luis Toledo; Mexico	1:49.61A	Dale Jones; Antigua and Barbuda	1:51.18A	Armando Rodríguez; Mexico	1:51.35A
1993	Javier Soto; Puerto Rico	1:49.40	Héctor Herrera; Cuba	1:49.99	Dale Jones; Antigua and Barbuda	1:50.05
1998	Norberto Téllez; Cuba	1:49.71	Ereisis Torres; Cuba	1:51.39	Mark Olivo; Venezuela	1:51.68
2002	José Manuel González; Venezuela	1:48.71	Jermaine Myers; Jamaica	1:48.89	Marvin Watts; Jamaica	1:49.11
2006	Andy González; Cuba	1:46.26	Sherridan Kirk; Trinidad and Tobago	1:46.55	Maury Castillo; Cuba	1:47.60
2010	Eduar Villanueva; Venezuela	1:47.73	Moise Joseph; Haiti	1:47.79	Aldwyn Sappleton; Jamaica	1:48.12
2014	Andy González; Cuba	1:45.73	Rafith Rodríguez; Colombia	1:45.74	Wesley Vázquez; Puerto Rico	1:46.05
2018	Jesús Tonatiu López; Mexico	1:45.2	Ryan Sánchez; Puerto Rico	1:46.3	Wesley Vázquez; Puerto Rico	1:46.6

=== 1500 metres ===
Games	Gold		Silver		Bronze	
1926	Modesto Careaga; Mexico	4:22.6A	Francisco Terrazas; Mexico		Daniel Eslava; Mexico	
1930	Darío Álvarez; Cuba	4:18.2	Pedro Lugo; Mexico		Enrique Velasco; Mexico	
1935	Delfino Campos; Mexico	4:11.9	Reinaldo Bernal; Mexico		Pedro Sarría; Cuba	
1938	Guy Grant; Jamaica	4:13.6	Alfredo Cortés; Mexico	4:13.8e	Miguel Corona; Mexico	
1946	Wilfred Tull; Trinidad and Tobago	4:07.8	Ken Hyland; Trinidad and Tobago	4:09.6	Arthur Dujon; Jamaica	4:12.4
1950	Frank Prince; Panama	4:13.0A	Ken Hyland; Trinidad and Tobago	4:14.8A	Guillermo Rojas; Guatemala	4:15.0A
1954	Frank Prince; Panama	4:16.65A	Heliodoro Martínez; Mexico	4:16.81A	Filemón Camacho; Venezuela	4:17.71A
1959	Harvey Borrero; Colombia	4:04.37	Alfredo Tinoco; Mexico	4:06.00	Ralph Gomes; British Guiana	4:08.16
1962	Álvaro Mejía; Colombia	3:51.4	Ralph Gomes; British Guiana	3:52.5	José Neira; Colombia	3:52.6
1966	Álvaro Mejía; Colombia	3:50.3	Orlando Martínez; Puerto Rico	3:52.4	José Neri; Mexico	3:52.4
1970	Byron Dyce; Jamaica	3:45.8	Donaldo Arza; Panama	3:46.1	Mario Pérez; Mexico	3:47.2
1974	Luis Medina; Cuba	3:44.18	José González; Venezuela	3:44.52	Carlos Martínez; Mexico	3:44.90
1978	Luis Medina; Cuba	3:44.47	Eduardo Castro; Mexico	3:45.14	Osmán Escobar; Venezuela	3:45.89
1982	Eduardo Castro; Mexico	3:41.84	Luis Medina; Cuba	3:41.92	Ignacio Melesio; Mexico	3:42.03
1986	Jacinto Navarrete; Colombia	3:43.72	Germán Beltrán; Venezuela	3:43.99	Félix Mesa; Cuba	3:45.50
1990	Arturo Barrios; Mexico	3:45.73A	Mauricio Hernández; Mexico	3:45.84A	José López; Venezuela	3:50.08A
1993	José López; Venezuela	3:43.89	Desmond Hector; Guyana	3:46.08	Arturo Espejel; Mexico	3:46.74
1998	Héctor Torres; Mexico	3:46.06	Emigdio Delgado; Venezuela	3:47.71	Pablo Olmedo; Mexico	3:48.19
2002	Juan Luis Barrios; Mexico	3:43.71	Alexander Greaux; Puerto Rico	3:45.75	Michael Tomlin; Jamaica	3:49.33
2006	Juan Luis Barrios; Mexico	3:42.52	David Freeman; Puerto Rico	3:43.84	Maury Castillo; Cuba	3:43.93
2010	Juan Luis Barrios; Mexico	3:44.85	Eduar Villanueva; Venezuela	3:45.04	Pablo Solares; Mexico	3:45.30
2014	Andy González; Cuba	3:45.52	Pablo Solares; Mexico	3:45.62	Christopher Sandoval; Mexico	3:47.55
2018	Fernando Daniel Martínez; Mexico	3:56.57	José Eduardo Rodríguez; Mexico	3:56.70	Carlos San Martín; Colombia	3:56.78

=== 3000 m steeplechase ===
Games	Gold		Silver		Bronze	
1954	Eligio Galicia; Mexico	10:22.38A	Víctorio Solares; Guatemala	10:51.49A	José Grenados; Mexico	11:00.80A
1959	Alfredo Tinoco; Mexico	10:50.8*	Luciano Gómez; Mexico	11:11.6*	Hernando Ruíz; Colombia	11:45.5*
1962	Erasmo Prado; Mexico	9:19.8	Elías Mendoza; Mexico	9:23.6	Pedro Mariani; Puerto Rico	9:31.4
1966	Flavio Buendía; Mexico	9:32.6	Rolf Duwe; Venezuela	9:37.8	Rigoberto Mendoza; Cuba	9:38.4
1970	Héctor Villanueva; Mexico	8:53.2	Antonio Villanueva; Mexico	8:53.4	Rigoberto Mendoza; Cuba	8:55.2
1974	José Cobo; Cuba	8:50.8	Antonio Villanueva; Mexico	8:52.0	Lucirio Garrido; Venezuela	8:54.8
1978	José Cobo; Cuba	8:46.39	Carlos Martínez; Mexico	8:52.13	Jaime Villate; Colombia	8:56.29
1982	José Cobo; Cuba	8:49.52	Lucirio Garrido; Venezuela	8:52.50	Pedro Guibert; Cuba	8:58.08
1986	Juan Ramón Conde; Cuba	8:42.38	Juan Jesús Linares; Cuba	8:46.11	Rafael Colmenares; Venezuela	8:52.83
1990	Germán Silva; Mexico	9:01.26A	Adalberto Vélez; Mexico	9:01.60A	Ángel Rodríguez; Cuba	9:14.60A
1993	Rubén García; Mexico	8:38.43	Héctor Arias; Mexico	8:40.19	Juan Ramón Conde; Cuba	8:45.62
1998	Salvador Miranda; Mexico	8:41.70	Néstor Nieves; Venezuela	8:43.34	Daniel Torres; Mexico	8:46.44
2002	Alexander Greaux; Puerto Rico	8:42.39	Salvador Miranda; Mexico	8:48.18	Néstor Nieves; Venezuela	8:53.56
2006	Alexander Greaux; Puerto Rico	8:44.51	Néstor Nieves; Venezuela	8:44.86	José Alberto Sánchez; Cuba	8:46.05
2010	Alexander Greaux; Puerto Rico	8:56.47	Josafat Gonzalez; Mexico	8:57.98	Marvin Blanco; Venezuela	9:03.10
2014	Marvin Blanco; Venezuela	8:43.76	José Peña; Venezuela	8:45.04	Luis Enrique Ibarra; Mexico	8:48.42
2018	Gerard Giraldo; Colombia	8:44.51 SB	Ricardo Estremera; Puerto Rico	8:46.24 SB	Andrés Camilo Camargo; Colombia	8:50.66

=== 5000 metres ===
Games	Gold		Silver		Bronze	
1926	Eduardo Quintanar; Mexico	17:16.6A	Juan Cortés; Mexico		Daniel Eslava; Mexico	
1930	Felipe Jardines; Mexico	16:28.0	Ascencio Galicia; Mexico		Delfino Campos; Mexico	
1935	Mariano Ramírez; Mexico	16:16.7	Juan Morales; Mexico		Herculano Ruiz; Guatemala	
1938	Guy Grant; Jamaica	17:55.1	Jesús Borgonio; Mexico		Maríano Ramírez; Mexico	
1946	Manny Ramjohn; Trinidad and Tobago	15:54.8	Jesús Borgonio; Mexico	15:55.0	Doroteo Flores; Guatemala	15:56.0
1950	Francisco Hernández; Mexico	16:05.8A	Doroteo Flores; Guatemala	16:10.6A	Isidoro Reséndiz; Mexico	16:24.7A
1954	Doroteo Flores; Guatemala	15:57.30A	Eligio Galicia; Mexico	16:04.52A	Francisco Hernández; Mexico	16:07.04A
1959	Isidro Segura; Mexico	15:41.94	Guadalupe Jiménez; Mexico	15:55.06	Marciano Castillo; Mexico	15:56.10
1962	Eligio Galicia; Mexico	14:46.6	Marciano Castillo; Mexico	15:06.2	Felipe Prado; Mexico	15:11.0
1966	Álvaro Mejía; Colombia	14:42.6	José Neri; Mexico	14:56.4	Valentín Robles; Mexico	15:33.2
1970	Mario Pérez; Mexico	14:24.4	Juan Martínez; Mexico	14:24.8	Pedro Miranda; Mexico	14:25.4
1974	Víctor Mora; Colombia	13:54.20	Jairo Correa; Colombia	14:03.00	José Neri; Mexico	14:04.00
1978	Rodolfo Gómez; Mexico	13:55.08	Domingo Tibaduiza; Colombia	13:56.88	José Gómez; Mexico	14:27.33
1982	Eduardo Castro; Mexico	14:11.05	Luis Medina; Cuba	14:24.81	Lucirio Garrido; Venezuela	14:24.94
1986	Mauricio González; Mexico	14:11.73	Marcos Barreto; Mexico	14:12.73	Juan Jesús Linares; Cuba	14:13.76
1990	Arturo Barrios; Mexico	13:49.89A	Marcos Barreto; Mexico	14:04.21A	Herder Vásquez; Colombia	14:18.48A
1993	Isaac García; Mexico	13:57.84	Gabino Apolonio; Mexico	14:06.43	Orlando Ceballos; Puerto Rico	14:31.08
1998	Pablo Olmedo; Mexico	14:01.85	Freddy González; Venezuela	14:04.77	Germán Beltrán; Venezuela	14:05.15
2002	Pablo Olmedo; Mexico	14:07.82	Freddy González; Venezuela	14:08.45	David Galván; Mexico	14:11.95
2006	Juan Luis Barrios; Mexico	14:09.08	Alejandro Suárez; Mexico	14:10.58	Norbert Gutiérrez; Cuba	14:13.50
2010	Juan Luis Barrios; Mexico	13:44.41 GR	Juan Carlos Romero; Mexico	13:56.17	Cleveland Forde; Guyana	14:08.95 PB
2014	Juan Luis Barrios; Mexico	14:15.98	Iván Darío González; Colombia	14:25.16	Mario Pacay; Guatemala	14:27.34
2018	José Mauricio González; Colombia	13:53.40 SB	Mario Pacay; Guatemala	13:56.30	Víctor Montañez; Mexico	14:05.87 PB

=== 10,000 metres ===
Games	Gold		Silver		Bronze	
1926(1)	Eduardo Quintanar; Mexico	36:02.4A	M.M. Hernández; Mexico		José Nevares; Mexico	
1926(2)	Tomás Zafiro; Mexico	36:05A	Juventino Guzmán; Mexico		Madardo Sánchez; Mexico	
1930	Felipe Jardines; Mexico	35:21.6	Francisco Morales; Mexico		Antonio Rodríguez; Costa Rica	
1935	Juan Morales; Mexico	33:16.0	Estanislao Galicia; Mexico		Braulio Flores; Mexico	
1938	Agustín Romero; Mexico	34:15.1	Guadalupe Martínez; Mexico		José López; El Salvador	
1946	Doroteo Flores; Guatemala	33:55.0	Agustín Romero; Mexico	34:54.8	Cipriano Gómez; Mexico	34:58.2
1950	Luis Velásquez; Guatemala	34:33.6A	Isidoro Reséndiz; Mexico	34:50.7A	Cruz Serrano; Mexico	34:52.5A
1954	Cruz Serrano; Mexico	32:59.63A	Doroteo Flores; Guatemala	33:52.80A	Francisco Hernández; Mexico	34:00.19A
1959	Josafath Hernández; Mexico	32:51.36	Isidro Segura; Mexico	32:59.17	Pedro Peralta; Mexico	33:25.51
1962	Eligio Galicia; Mexico	30:55.2	Asencio Escalona; Mexico	31:40.8	Marciano Castillo; Mexico	31:44.4
1966	Álvaro Mejía; Colombia	31:34.0	Valentín Robles; Mexico	32:11.0	Juan Martínez; Mexico	32:13.0
1970	Juan Martínez; Mexico	30:49.0	Mario Pérez; Mexico	30:51.6	Andrés Romero; Mexico	30:57.6
1974	Domingo Tibaduiza; Colombia	30:39.4	Rafael Pérez; Costa Rica	30:41.0	Pedro Miranda; Mexico	30:41.2
1978	Rodolfo Gómez; Mexico	29:34.64	Domingo Tibaduiza; Colombia	29:38.66	Luis Hernández; Mexico	30:23.84
1982	Aldo Allen; Cuba	30:13.12	Enrique Aquino; Mexico	30:15.35	Gerardo Alcalá; Mexico	30:28.04
1986	Francisco Pacheco; Mexico	29:39.56	Gerardo Alcalá; Mexico	30:05.35	Eduardo Maldonado; Puerto Rico	30:29.39
1990	Dionicio Cerón; Mexico	29:46.09A	Isaac García; Mexico	30:05.63A	Herder Vásquez; Colombia	30:28.89A
1993	Dionicio Cerón; Mexico	28:58.11	Isaac García; Mexico	29:33.74	Orlando Ceballos; Puerto Rico	30:11.60
1998	Germán Beltrán; Venezuela	29:49.06	Julio César Valle; Mexico	29:53.40	Gabino Apolonio; Mexico	30:11.29
2002	Pablo Olmedo; Mexico	28:36.67	Teodoro Vega; Mexico	28:42.86	William Naranjo; Colombia	29:12.23
2006	David Galván; Mexico	29:40.08	Javier Alexander Guarín; Colombia	29:41.51	Norbert Gutiérrez; Cuba	29:50.53
2010	Juan Carlos Romero; Mexico	29:13.71	Tomás Luna; Mexico	29:14.15	Luis Collazo; Puerto Rico	29:36.35
2014	Juan Luis Barrios; Mexico	29:13.63	Juan Carlos Romero; Mexico	29:28.32	Iván Darío González; Colombia	29:41.31
2018	Juan Luis Barrios; Mexico	30:07.49	Mario Pacay; Guatemala	30:09.79	Iván Darío González; Colombia	30:15.23

=== 110 metres hurdles ===
Games	Gold		Silver		Bronze	
1926	Armando Díaz; Mexico	16.4A	José Sorzano; Cuba		Dionisio Fuentefría; Cuba	
1930	Fernando Navarro; Panama	15.6	José Sorzano; Cuba		Carlos Molina; Guatemala	
1935	Roberto Sánchez; Mexico	15.8	Juan José Zulueta; Cuba		Raúl Torres; Puerto Rico	
1938	Horacio Quiñones; Puerto Rico	14.8	Téofilo Colón; Puerto Rico	14.9e	Roberto Sánchez; Mexico	15.2e
1946	Eligio Barbería; Cuba	14.8	Téofilo Colón; Puerto Rico	15.5	Julio Sabater; Puerto Rico	
1950	Julio Sabater; Puerto Rico	14.9A	Samuel Anderson; Cuba	15.2A	Vicente Tavárez; Mexico	15.2A
1954	Samuel Anderson; Cuba	14.3A	Keith Gardner; Jamaica	14.5A	Teófilo Davis Bell; Venezuela	15.2A
1959	Teófilo Davis Bell; Venezuela	15.39	Téofilo Colón; Puerto Rico	15.95	Víctor Maldonado; Venezuela	16.05
1962	Lázaro Betancourt; Cuba	14.2	Heriberto Cruz; Puerto Rico	14.5	Lancelot Bobb; Venezuela	14.7
1966	Hernando Arrechea; Colombia	14.2w	Ray Harvey; Jamaica	14.4w	Juan Morales; Cuba	14.5w
1970	Juan Morales; Cuba	14.0	Arnaldo Bristol; Puerto Rico	14.2	Guillermo Núñez; Cuba	14.5
1974	Alejandro Casañas; Cuba	13.80w	Guillermo Núñez; Cuba	13.93w	Francisco Dumeng; Puerto Rico	14.10
1978	Alejandro Casañas; Cuba	13.67	Mariano Reyes; Dominican Republic	14.68	Karl Smith; Jamaica	14.71
1982	Alejandro Casañas; Cuba	13.38	Juan Saborit; Cuba	13.91	Modesto Castillo; Dominican Republic	13.95
1986	Ángel Bueno; Cuba	13.86	Juan Saborit; Cuba	13.91	Ernesto Torres; Puerto Rico	14.10
1990	Emilio Valle; Cuba	13.64A	Alexis Sánchez; Cuba	13.94A	Elvis Cedeño; Venezuela	14.18A
1993	Emilio Valle; Cuba	13.87	Wagner Marseille; Haiti	14.10	Alexis Sánchez; Cuba	14.14
1998	Anier García; Cuba	13.27	Steve Brown; Trinidad and Tobago	13.56	Erik Batte; Cuba	13.84
2002	Dudley Dorival; Haiti	13.82w	Paulo Villar; Colombia	13.94w	Ricardo Melbourne; Jamaica	14.02w
2006	Dayron Robles; Cuba	13.12 GR	Paulo Villar; Colombia	13.29 NR, AR	Yoel Hernández; Cuba	13.51
2010	Ryan Brathwaite; Barbados	13.39	Eric Keddo; Jamaica	13.52	Héctor Cotto; Puerto Rico	13.71
2014	Yordan O'Farrill; Cuba	13.46	Jhoanis Portilla; Cuba	13.53	Greggmar Swift; Barbados	13.59
2018	Shane Brathwaite; Barbados	13.38 SB	Ruebin Walters; Trinidad and Tobago	13.57	Roger Iribarne; Cuba	13.58

=== 400 metres hurdles ===
Games	Gold		Silver		Bronze	
1926	Armando Díaz; Mexico	57.8A	José María Suárez; Cuba		Ernesto Estévez; Cuba	
1930	Porfirio Franca; Cuba	58.4	Francisco Montalvo; Cuba		José María Suárez; Cuba	
1935	Lázaro Hernández; Cuba	55.5	Gilberto González; Puerto Rico		Ernesto Alayeto; Cuba	
1938	Evelio Espinosa; Cuba	55.8	Salvador Torrós; Puerto Rico	55.9e	Arthur Wint; Jamaica	
1946	Eligio Barbería; Cuba	55.3	Relín Sosa; Puerto Rico	56.4	Remigio Castro; Cuba	56.5
1950	Jaime Aparicio; Colombia	54.9A	Relín Sosa; Puerto Rico	56.6A	Carlos Monges; Mexico	57.3A
1954	Jaime Aparicio; Colombia	53.35A	Juan Leiva; Venezuela	53.98A	Amadeo Francis; Puerto Rico	54.28A
1959	Ovidio de Jesús; Puerto Rico	53.42	Víctor Maldonado; Venezuela	54.18	Oscar Fernández; Mexico	55.51
1962	Víctor Maldonado; Venezuela	51.6	Juan Montes; Puerto Rico	53.0	Jorge Cumberbatch; Cuba	53.2
1966	Heriberto Cruz; Puerto Rico	52.4	Víctor Maldonado; Venezuela	52.5	Arístides Pineda; Venezuela	53.5
1970	Juan García; Cuba	50.6	Césare Sánchez; Mexico	50.6	Miguel Olivera; Cuba	51.3
1974	Fabio Zúñiga; Colombia	50.61	Guillermo Núñez; Cuba	50.87	Iván Mangual; Puerto Rico	51.65
1978	Clive Barriffe; Jamaica	50.16	Julio Ferrer; Puerto Rico	50.86	Luis Alex Misiniak; Colombia	50.97
1982	Frank Montiéh; Cuba	50.64	Jorge Batista; Cuba	50.98	Greg Rolle; Bahamas	51.18
1986	Winthrop Graham; Jamaica	50.03	David Charlton; Bahamas	50.14	Jesús Aguilasocho; Mexico	50.48
1990	Domingo Cordero; Puerto Rico	49.61A	Antonio Smith; Venezuela	51.32A	Llimy Rivas; Colombia	52.87A
1993	Domingo Cordero; Puerto Rico	49.60	Pedro Piñera; Cuba	50.12	Juan Gutiérrez; Mexico	50.47
1998	Dinsdale Morgan; Jamaica	48.87	Emilio Valle; Cuba	49.66	Kemel Thompson; Jamaica	49.67
2002	Oscar Juanz; Mexico	50.46	Miguel García; Dominican Republic	51.05	Roberto Carvajal; Mexico	51.62
2006	Bayano Kamani; Panama	49.44	Ian Weakley; Jamaica	49.74	Bryan Steele; Jamaica	50.12
2010	Leford Green; Jamaica	48.47 GR	Javier Culson; Puerto Rico	48.58	Roxroy Cato; Jamaica	49.62
2014	Omar Cisneros; Cuba	49.56	Eric Alejandro; Puerto Rico	50.05	Leslie Murray; U.S. Virgin Islands	50.21
2018	Kyron McMaster; British Virgin Islands	47.60 GR	Annsert Whyte; Jamaica	48.50 SB	Juander Santos; Dominican Republic	48.77 SB

=== 4 × 100 metres relay ===
Games	Gold		Silver		Bronze	
1926	Mexico; Herminio Ahumada; Mario Gómez; Francisco Ramírez; Mariano Aguilar	43.6A	Cuba; Mario González; Calixto García; Otilio Campuzano; Francisco Arango		Guatemala; Gonzalo Palarea; Ángel Herrera; Víctor Granai; Manuel Padilla	
1930	Cuba; Alberto Torriente; Conrado Rodríguez; Gustavo Alfonso; Julio Seino	43.4	Mexico; Francisco Robledo; Mario García; José R. del Río; Mario Gómez	44.0e	Panama; Rafael Arana; Antonio R. Jaén; Alberto Belisario; Reginald Beckford	44.0e
1935	Cuba; Conrado Rodríguez; José Acosta; Alberto Torriente; Norberto Verrier	43.2	Puerto Rico; Eulalio Villodas; Eugenio Guerra; Frank Cepero; Gilberto González		Mexico; Manuel Ortiz; Alejo C. Pérez; Jesús Moraila; Fernando Ramírez	
1938	Puerto Rico; Eulalio Villodas; Eugenio Guerra; Rubén Malavé; Gaspar Vázquez	42.2	Panama; Teófilo Thomas; Gilberto Campbell; Jennings Blackett; Carlos Belisario	42.7e	Cuba; Jacinto Ortiz; José Acosta; Norberto Verrier; Hilario Sotolongo	42.8e
1946	Panama; Clifford Loney; Arturo Thomas; Clayton Clarke; Lloyd La Beach	43.0	Cuba; Rafael Fortún; Jesús Farrés; Pedro Castillo; Eligio Barbería	43.1	Trinidad and Tobago; George Lewis; Nathaniel Preddie; Albert McLean; McDonald Bailey	43.5
1950	Cuba; Rafael Fortún; Jesús Farrés; Raúl Mazorra; Dioscórides Wilson	41.5A	Jamaica; George Rhoden; Lancelot Thompson; Leslie Laing; Herb McKenley	41.6A	Panama; Lloyd La Beach; Samuel LaBeach; Felipe Malcoln; Cirilo McSween	42.0A
1954	Jamaica; Byron LaBeach; George Rhoden; Keith Gardner; Leslie Laing	41.06A (40.9)	Cuba; Israel Mestre; Raúl Mazorra; Manuel Peñalver; Rafael Fortún	41.56A (41.3)	Mexico; Javier de la Torre; José M. Abascal; Javier Souza; Sergio Higuera	42.04A (41.9)
1959	Venezuela; Clive Bonas; Lloyd Murad; Horacio Esteves; Rafael Romero	42.14	Puerto Rico; Miguel Rivera; Rubén Díaz; Ramón L. Vega; Manuel Rivera	42.27	Panama; Luis E. Carter; Hubert Brown; Martín Francis; Manuel Rivas	42.71
1962	Venezuela; Arquímedes Herrera; Lloyd Murad; Rafael Romero; Horacio Esteves	40.0	Trinidad and Tobago; Cipriani Phillip; Vincent Ackoon; Wilton Jackson; Edwin Roberts	40.7	Jamaica; Percival McNeil; Patrick Robinson; Lynn Headley; Dennis Johnson	40.8
1966	Jamaica; Wellesley Clayton; Pablo McNeil; Ernest Headley; Michael Fray	40.5	Trinidad and Tobago; Cipriani Phillip; Winston Short; Henry Noel; Edwin Roberts	40.6	Cuba; Félix Eugellés; Juan Morales; Manuel Montalvo; Enrique Figuerola	40.6
1970	Cuba; Hermes Ramírez; Pablo Montes; Juan Morales; José Triana	39.4	Colombia; Arquímides Mina; Jimmy Sierra; Wenceslao Ferrín; Pedro Grajales	40.8	Puerto Rico; Enrique Montalvo; Víctor López; Jorge Vizcarrondo; Arnaldo Bristol	40.8
1974	Cuba; José Triana; Pablo Montes; Pablo Bandomo; Silvio Leonard	39.62	Dominican Republic; Porfirio Veras; Julio Meades; Enrique Javier; Gil Fortuna	40.35	Netherlands Antilles; Elmer Vorn; Edwin Nar; Henry Braafhart; Adsel Trumoet	41.79
1978	Trinidad and Tobago; Edwin Noel; Hasely Crawford; Anthony Husbands; Ephraim Serrette	39.13	Cuba; Juan Saborit; Alejandro Casañas; Silvio Leonard; Osvaldo Lara	39.44	Dominican Republic; Juan Contreras; Gregorio García; Enrique Almarante; Rafael Félix	39.62
1982	Cuba; Osvaldo Lara; Alejandro Casañas; Leandro Peñalver; Juan Saborit	39.15	Jamaica; Joseph Boyd; Earle Laing; Mark Senior; Floyd Brown	39.94	Dominican Republic; Juan Contreras; Wilfredo Almonte; Juan Núñez; Gerardo Suero	40.11
1986	Cuba; Osvaldo Lara; Leandro Peñalver; Sergio Querol; Andrés Simón	38.74	Jamaica; Greg Meghoo; Andrew Smith; Raymond Stewart; Leroy Reid	38.96	Dominican Republic; José Méndez; Gerardo Suero; Fernando Reynoso; Juan Núñez	39.56
1990	Cuba; Andrés Simón; Leandro Peñalver; Félix Stevens; Joel Isai	39.09A	Puerto Rico; Félix Molina; Domingo Cordero; Edgardo Guilbe; Elmer Williams	39.81A	Venezuela; Elvis Cedeño; Eliexer Pulgar; Henry Aguiar; Edgar Chourio	40.65A
1993	Cuba; Andrés Simón; Leandro Peñalver; Joel Isasi; Jorge Aguilera	39.24	Puerto Rico; Félix Molina; Domingo Cordero; Edgardo Guilbe; Elmer Williams	40.01	Colombia; Wenceslao Ferrín; Wilson Cañizales; Luis Vega; John Mena	40.09
1998	Cuba; Alfredo García; Misael Ortiz; Iván García; Luis Pérez	38.79	Jamaica; Garth Robinson; Patrick Jarrett; Leon Gordon; Clarkson Reid	39.04	Trinidad and Tobago; Niconnor Alexander; Steve Brown; Peter Fredericks; Julieon Raeburn	39.54
2002	Dominican Republic; Leonardo Matos; Juan Sainfleur; Luis Morillo; Yoel Báez	39.41	Venezuela; Juan Morillo; José Carabalí; William Hernández; Hely Ollarves	39.87	Trinidad and Tobago; Alvin Henry; Shane Dyer; Andre Brown; Dion Rodriguez	40.08
2006	Netherlands Antilles; Brian Mariano; Prince Kwidama; Jairo Duzant; Churandy Martina	39.29	Bahamas; Adrian Griffith; Derrick Atkins; Rodney Green; Dominic Demeritte	39.44	Jamaica; Lerone Clarke; Xavier Brown; Herbert McGregor; Carl Barrett	39.45
2010	Trinidad and Tobago; Rondel Sorrillo; Marc Burns; Emmanuel Callender; Keston Bledman	38.24 GR	Jamaica; Kenroy Anderson; Oshane Bailey; Rasheed Dwyer; Lerone Clarke	38.78	Netherlands Antilles; Prince Kwidama; Brian Mariano; Curtis Cock; Churandy Martina	38.82
2014	Cuba; César Yadiel Ruiz; Reynier Mena; Yadier Luis; Yaniel Carrero	38.94	Dominican Republic; Gustavo Cuesta; Yoandry Andújar; Stanly del Carmen; Yancarlos Martínez	39.01	Venezuela; Alberto Aguilar; Dubeiker Cedeño; Álvaro Cassiani; Arturo Ramírez	39.22
2018	Barbados; Shane Brathwaite; Mario Burke; Burkheart Ellis; Jaquone Hoyte	38.41 NR	Dominican Republic; Christopher Valdez; Yohandris Andújar; Stanly del Carmen; Yancarlos Martínez	38.71 SB	Jamaica; Nesta Carter; Romario Williams; Rasheed Dwyer; Javoy Tucker	38.79

=== 4 × 400 metres relay ===
Games	Gold		Silver		Bronze	
1926	Mexico; Alfonso García; Carlos García; Jesús Moraila; Lucílo Iturbe	3:25.6A	Cuba; Mario González; Francisco Arango; Arturo Ojeda; Luis Estévez		Guatemala; Ángel Herrera; Fernando Murúa; Enrique Asturias; Gonzalo Palarea	
1930	Mexico; José M. Álvarez; Carlos de Anda; Lucílo Iturbe; Jesús Moraila	3:26.6	Cuba; Mario González; Juan Gutsens; José Suárez; Horacio Gómez	3:30.2e	Guatemala; Gonzalo Palarea; Manuel Hernández; Ricardo Dastin; Carlos Lara	
1935	Cuba; Lius Vázquez; Lázaro Hernández; Vicente Fernández; Horacio Gómez	3:22.4	Mexico; Carlos de Anda; Antonio Quezada; José M. Álvarez; Julio Rodríguez		Puerto Rico; Gilberto González; Raúl Torres; José Martínez; Eulalio Villodas	
1938	Panama; Harold Scott; Stanley Edgardo; Wesley Chevans; Arturo Baker	3:21.5	Mexico; Adolfo Curiel; Alfredo Mariscal; Gilberto Castruita; Enrique Sánchez	3:23.0e	Cuba; Armando Baluja; Gerardo Casanova; Luis Vázquez; Evelio Espínola	3:24.5e
1946	Jamaica; Herb McKenley; Clinton Woodstock; George Rhoden; Arthur Wint	3:18.0	Cuba; Juan A. Sáez; José L. Gómez; Carlos Bombalier; Ángel García	3:21.4	Panama; Eric Ferguson; David Benskin; Reginaldo Matthews; Cirilo McSween	3:23.2
1950	Panama; Samuel LaBeach; Cirilo McSween; Frank Prince; Lloyd La Beach	3:17.2A	Cuba; Hermes L. Riverí; Juan A. Sáez; Ángel García; Evelio Planas	3:19.0A	Jamaica; Benson Ford; Leslie Laing; Egbert McNeil; George Rhoden	3:19.0A
1954	Jamaica; Leslie Laing; Byron LaBeach; Keith Gardner; George Rhoden	3:12.25A (3:12.0)	Puerto Rico; Amadeo Francis; Ismael Delgado; Frank Rivera; Ovidio de Jesús	3:17.70A (3:17.4)	Cuba; Ángel García; Evelio Planas; Armando Vázquez; Emilio Pestana	3:17.83A (3:17.7)
1959	Puerto Rico; Frank Rivera; Manuel Rivera; Ovidio de Jesús; Iván Rodríguez	3:16.91	Venezuela; Emilio Romero; Davis Welch; Guillermo Rocca; Evaristo Edie	3:22.88	Mexico; Rodolfo Ramírez; Oscar Fernández; Juan J. Godínez; Jorge Terán	3:24.46
1962	Jamaica; Mel Spence; Gilwyn Williams; Malcolm Spence; George Kerr	3:11.6	Trinidad and Tobago; Roderick Manswell; Juan Betancourt; Wilton Jackson; Edwin Roberts	3:12.5	Puerto Rico; Germán Guenard; José Villalonga; Gilberto Faberlle; Ovidio de Jesús	3:15.8
1966	Jamaica; Clifton Forbes; Mel Spence; Neville Myton; Rupert Hoilette	3:08.8	Trinidad and Tobago; Ben Cayenne; Lennox Yearwood; Edwin Skinner; Edwin Roberts	3:09.4	Puerto Rico; Juan Franceschi; Rafael Vega; José Andino; Germán Guenard	3:10.3
1970	Cuba; Miguel Olivera; Rodobaldo Díaz; Juan García; Antonio Álvarez	3:06.4	Mexico; Melesio Piña; Carmelo Reyes; Javier Sardo; Alejandro Sánchez	3:07.8	Puerto Rico; Tomás Fernández; Raymond Garay; Orominio Santaella; Carlos Morell	3:09.0
1974	Cuba; Eduardo García; Eddy Gutiérrez; Antonio Álvarez; Alberto Juantorena	3:06.36	Venezuela; Víctor Patíñez; Héctor López; Félix Mata; Eric Phillips	3:07.23	Jamaica; Noel Gray; Seymour Newman; Anthony Davis; Clive Barriffe	3:07.52
1978	Jamaica; Clive Barriffe; Oliver Heywood; Floyd Brown; Bert Cameron	3:03.76	Trinidad and Tobago; Anthony Myers; Michael Paul; Mike Solomon; Joseph Coombs	3:05.01	Cuba; Alexis Misignak; Ernesto Vinent; Carlos Álvarez; Alberto Juantorena	3:05.57
1982	Cuba; Agustín Pavó; Carlos Reyté; Roberto Ramos; Alberto Juantorena	3:03.59	Jamaica; Floyd Brown; Mark Senior; Bert Cameron; Karl Smith	3:04.78	Trinidad and Tobago; Michael Puckerin; Joseph Coombs; Ali St. Louis; Andrew Bruce	3:08.20
1986	Cuba; Leandro Peñalver; Agustín Pavó; Jorge Valentín; Félix Stevens	3:02.41	Trinidad and Tobago; Ali St. Louis; Ian Morris; Michael Paul; Carlyle Bernard	3:04.57	Barbados; Henrico Atkins; David Carter; Ezra Catwell; Elvis Forde	3:06.88
1990	Jamaica; Evon Clarke; Howard Burnett; Terrence McCrea; Devon Morris	3:05.22A	Barbados; Ronald Thorne; Stevon Roberts; Seibert Straughn; Terry Harewood	3:05.48A	Cuba; Héctor Herrera; Leandro Peñalver; Emilio Valle; Lázaro Martínez	3:06.17A
1993	Cuba; Omar Mena; Héctor Herrera; Lázaro Martínez; Norberto Téllez	3:05.62	Trinidad and Tobago; Patrick Delice; Wendell Williams; Dazel Jules; Neil de Silva	3:06.96	Jamaica; Michael Anderson; Carl McPherson; Danny McFarlane; Evon Clarke	3:07.23
1998	Cuba; Omar Mena; Jorge Crusellas; Edel Hevia; Norberto Téllez	3:03.18	Jamaica; Michael McDonald; Greg Haughton; Gregory Hines; Davian Clarke	3:03.26	Bahamas; Avard Moncur; Carl Oliver; Chris Brown; Dennis Darling	3:04.16
2002	Dominican Republic; Leonardo Matos; Gerardo Peralta; Carlos Santa; Félix Sánchez	3:04.15	Jamaica; Germaine Myers; Michael McDonald; Michael Williams; Lansford Spence	3:05.40	Venezuela; Danny Núñez; Jonathan Palma; Luis Luna; William Hernández	3:05.71
2006	Jamaica; Sanjay Ayre; Leford Green; Ricardo Chambers; Bryan Steele	3:01.78 GR	Trinidad and Tobago; Renny Quow; Kevon Pierre; Jamil James; Damion Barry	3:02.65	Dominican Republic; Félix Sánchez; Arismendy Peguero; Carlos Santa; Yoel Tapia	3:03.25
2010	Jamaica; Oral Thompson; Leford Green; Roxroy Cato; Allodin Fothergill	3:01.68 GR	Bahamas; Andretti Bain; Michael Mathieu; La'Sean Pickstock; Demetrius Pinder	3:01.82	Trinidad and Tobago; Zwede Hewitt; Lalonde Gordon; Gavyn Nero; Jarrin Solomon	3:04.07
2014	Cuba; William Collazo; Raidel Acea; Osmaidel Pellicier; Yoandys Lescay	3:00.70 GR	Venezuela; Alberto Aguilar; Alberth Bravo; José Meléndez; Freddy Mezones	3:01.80	Colombia; Bernardo Baloyes; Carlos Andrés Lemos; Diego Palomeque; Rafith Rodríguez	3:02.52
2018	Cuba; Leandro Zamora; Adrián Chacón; Raydel Rojas; Yoandys Lescay	3:03.87 SB	Dominican Republic; Luguelín Santos; Juander Santos; Andito Charles; Leonel Bonón	3:03.92 SB	Colombia; Diego Palomeque; Rafith Rodríguez; Yilmar Herrera; Jhon Perlaza	3:04.35 SB

=== High jump ===
Games	Gold		Silver		Bronze	
1926	Alfonso Stoopen; Mexico	1.77A	Francisco Costas; Mexico	1.75A	Juan Alonso; Cuba	1.75A
1930	Rafael Pérez; Cuba	1.75	Joseph MacKenzie; Jamaica	1.75	Fernando Navarro; Panama	1.70
1935	Juan Luyanda; Puerto Rico	1.77	José Martínez; Puerto Rico	1.73	Rafael Pérez; Cuba	1.71
1938	Juan Luyanda; Puerto Rico	1.89	Arturo Baker; Panama	1.87	Juan Rafael Palmer; Puerto Rico	1.83
1946	Miguel Clovis; Panama	1.85	Gilberto Torres; Puerto Rico	1.85	Francisco Castro; Puerto Rico	1.85
1950	Gilberto Torres; Puerto Rico	1.89A	Oswald Lyon; Jamaica	1.89A	Benjamín Casado; Puerto Rico	1.85A
1954	Roberto López; Cuba	1.87A	Gaspar Vigo; Puerto Rico	1.87A	Manuel Gómez; Venezuela	1.85A
1959	Teodoro Palacios; Guatemala	1.91	Julio Lleras; Puerto Rico	1.91	Roberto Procel; Mexico	1.89
1962	Teodoro Palacios; Guatemala	2.00	Anton Norris; Barbados	1.98	Ernle Haisley; Jamaica	1.94
1966	Teodoro Palacios; Guatemala	2.03	Anton Norris; Barbados	1.98	Luis Planchart; Venezuela	1.93
1970	Miguel Durañona; Cuba	2.06	Teodoro Palacios; Guatemala	1.98	Lloyd Turnquist; Bahamas	1.95
1974	Richard Spencer; Cuba	2.10	Amado Olaguiber; Cuba	2.07	Gilberto Campbell; Cuba	2.04
1978	Richard Spencer; Cuba	2.12	Rodolfo Madrigal; Costa Rica	2.12	Jamil Justiniano; Puerto Rico	2.09
1982	Francisco Centelles; Cuba	2.25	Steve Wray; Bahamas	2.17	Clarence Saunders; Bermuda	2.17
1986	Francisco Centelles; Cuba	2.22	Bárbaro Díaz; Cuba; Alfredo Mejía; Dominican Republic	2.20		
1990	Javier Sotomayor; Cuba	2.34A	Marino Drake; Cuba	2.32A	Carlos Arzuaga; Puerto Rico	2.17A
1993	Javier Sotomayor; Cuba	2.35	Marino Drake; Cuba	2.20	Antonio Burgos; Puerto Rico	2.14
1998	Javier Sotomayor; Cuba	2.37	Gilmar Mayo; Colombia	2.30	Julio Luciano; Dominican Republic	2.21
2002	Gerardo Martínez; Mexico	2.18	Omar Camacho; Puerto Rico	2.15	Gilmar Mayo; Colombia	2.15
2006	Gilmar Mayo; Colombia	2.19	Trevor Barry; Bahamas	2.16	Gerardo Martínez; Mexico	2.16
2010	Donald Thomas; Bahamas	2.28 m	Trevor Barry; Bahamas	2.28 m	Wanner Miller; Colombia	2.19 m
2014	Sergio Mestre; Cuba	2.26 m	Eure Yáñez; Venezuela	2.24 m	Ryan Ingraham; Bahamas	2.24 m
2018	Donald Thomas; Bahamas	2.28 m	Eure Yáñez; Venezuela	2.28 m =SB	Jermaine Francis; Saint Kitts and Nevis	2.28 m NR

=== Pole vault ===
Games	Gold		Silver		Bronze	
1926	José Sanjurjo; Cuba	3.43A	Fernando Álvarez; Cuba	3.43A	Juan Figueroa; Mexico	3.38A
1930	Humberto Villa; Cuba	3.64	Manuel Luciano; Puerto Rico	3.64	José Sanjurjo; Cuba	3.48
1935	José Sabater; Puerto Rico	3.73	Gustavo Pontvianne; Mexico	3.68	Rigoberto Pérez; Mexico	3.55
1938	Rigoberto Pérez; Mexico	3.74	José Sabater; Puerto Rico	3.65	Manuel Boyer; Puerto Rico	3.65
1946	José Vicente; Puerto Rico	3.98	José Barbosa; Puerto Rico	3.84	Jesús Centeno; Mexico	3.77
1950	José Vicente; Puerto Rico	4.10A	José Barbosa; Puerto Rico	3.78A	José Fontanés; Puerto Rico	3.63A
1954	José Barbosa; Puerto Rico	4.05A	Jorge Aguilera; Mexico	3.90A	Brígido Iriarte; Venezuela	3.90A
1959	Rolando Cruz; Puerto Rico	4.40	Rubén Cruz; Puerto Rico	3.96	Miguel Rivera; Puerto Rico	3.79
1962	Rolando Cruz; Puerto Rico	4.72	Rubén Cruz; Puerto Rico	4.26	Luis Quintero; Colombia	3.81
1966	Rolando Cruz; Puerto Rico	4.54	Rubén Cruz; Puerto Rico	4.30	Luis Quintero; Colombia	4.15
1970	Juan Laza; Cuba	4.65	Arturo Esquerra; Mexico	4.40	Jorge Miranda; Puerto Rico	4.30
1974	Roberto Moré; Cuba	4.95	Juan Laza; Cuba	4.75	Edgardo Rivera; Puerto Rico	4.55
1978	Augusto Perdomo; Cuba	5.00	Elberto Pratt; Mexico	4.80	Rubén Camino; Cuba	4.80
1982	Rubén Camino; Cuba	5.00	José Echevarría; Cuba	5.00	Miguel Escoto; Mexico	4.90
1986	Rubén Camino; Cuba	5.20	José Echevarría; Cuba	5.00	Efram Meléndez; Puerto Rico	4.90
1990	Ángel García; Cuba	5.40A	Miguel Berrío; Cuba	5.20A	Konstantín Zagustín; Venezuela	5.10A
1993	Edgar Díaz; Puerto Rico	5.30	Alberto Manzano; Cuba	5.30		
1998	Edgar Díaz; Puerto Rico	5.30	Ricardo Diez; Venezuela	5.30	Jorge Tienda; Mexico	5.10
2002	Dominic Johnson; Saint Lucia	5.41	Jorge Tienda; Mexico	5.00	Oscar Hernández; El Salvador	4.70
2006	Robison Pratt; Mexico	5.50 NR	Dominic Johnson; Saint Lucia	5.20	David Rojas; Colombia	4.60
2010	Giovanni Lanaro; Mexico	5.60 m GR	Brandon Estrada; Puerto Rico	5.40 m	Christian Sánchez; Mexico	5.20 m
2014	Lázaro Borges; Cuba	5.30 m	Yankier Lara; Cuba	5.10 m	Raúl Alejandro Ríos; Mexico	5.00 m
2018	Lázaro Borges; Cuba Walter Viáfara; Colombia	5.30 m SB 5.30 m =PB	Not awarded		Eduardo Nápoles; Cuba	5.20 m

=== Long jump ===
Games	Gold		Silver		Bronze	
1926	Alfonso de Gortari; Mexico	6.70A	José Torriente; Cuba	6.53A	Carlos Carranza; Mexico	6.46A
1930	Fernando Navarro; Panama	6.72	Carlos Zamarripa; Mexico	6.60	José Torriente; Cuba	6.57
1935	Norberto Verrier; Cuba	6.68	Pascual Gutiérrez; Mexico	6.57	Raúl Juliá; Puerto Rico	6.49
1938	Juan Luyanda; Puerto Rico	6.75	Juan Rafael Palmer; Puerto Rico	6.69	Salvador Torrós; Puerto Rico	6.55
1946	Lloyd La Beach; Panama	6.96	Lance Thompson; Jamaica	6.95	Francisco Castro; Puerto Rico	6.92
1950	Francisco Castro; Puerto Rico	7.01A	Benjamín Casado; Puerto Rico	6.95A	Claudio Cabreja; Cuba	6.94A
1954	Claudio Cabreja; Cuba	7.46A	Víctor Hernández; Cuba	7.16A	Keith Gardner; Jamaica	7.02A
1959	Deryck Taylor; Jamaica	7.07	Julio Lleras; Puerto Rico	6.67	Jesús Piña; Venezuela	6.60
1962	Juan Muñoz; Venezuela	7.68	Wellesley Clayton; Jamaica	7.60	Abelardo Pacheco; Cuba	7.16
1966	Wellesley Clayton; Jamaica	7.64	Abelardo Pacheco; Cuba	7.55	Byron Lewis; Jamaica	7.51
1970	Abelardo Pacheco; Cuba	7.69	Jorge Stevens; Cuba	7.49	Galdino Flores; Mexico	7.43
1974	Wilfredo Maisonave; Cuba	7.44	Milán Matos; Cuba	7.43	Francisco Gómez; Cuba	7.41
1978	David Giralt; Cuba	7.82	Milán Matos; Cuba	7.77	Ron Chambers; Jamaica	7.77
1982	Delroy Poyser; Jamaica	7.90	Wilfredo Almonte; Dominican Republic	7.82	Steve Hanna; Bahamas	7.80
1986	Jaime Jefferson; Cuba	8.34	Elmer Williams; Puerto Rico	7.81	Ubaldo Duany; Cuba	7.57
1990	Juan Felipe Ortíz; Cuba	8.17A	Jaime Jefferson; Cuba	8.06A	Darío Ruíz; Mexico	7.95A
1993	Wendell Williams; Trinidad and Tobago	7.95	Michael Francis; Puerto Rico	7.92	Jaime Jefferson; Cuba	7.85
1998	Iván Pedroso; Cuba	8.45	James Beckford; Jamaica	8.16	Joan Lino Martínez; Cuba	8.09
2002	Sergio Sauceda; Mexico	7.48	José Mercedes; Dominican Republic	7.32	Kevin Arthurton; Saint Kitts and Nevis	7.26
2006	Irving Saladino; Panama	8.29	Iván Pedroso; Cuba	7.92	Ibrahim Camejo; Cuba	7.83
2010	Tyrone Smith; Bermuda	8.22 m NR	Muhammad Halim; U.S. Virgin Islands	7.79 m	Carlos Morgan; Cayman Islands	7.72 m
2014	David Registe; Dominica	7.79 m (w: -0.2 m/s)	Muhammad Taqi Abdul-Halim; U.S. Virgin Islands	7.75 m (w: -0.6 m/s)	Yunior Díaz; Cuba	7.66 m (w: -0.9 m/s)
2018	Ramone Bailey; Jamaica	8.07 m	Tyrone Smith; Bermuda	8.03 m SB	Andwuelle Wright; Trinidad and Tobago	7.94 m

=== Triple jump ===
Games	Gold		Silver		Bronze	
1926	Sergio Macías; Cuba	13.29A	Manuel Montes; Cuba	13.13A	Armando Díaz; Mexico	13.09A
1930	Manuel Suárez; Cuba	13.71	Manuel García; Cuba	13.14	José Fernández; Cuba	13.04
1935	Orlando Bello; Cuba	13.71	Armando Fernández; Cuba	13.70	Salvador Alanís; Mexico	13.50
1938	Juan Rafael Palmer; Puerto Rico	13.86	Juan Luyanda; Puerto Rico	13.76	Orlando Bello; Cuba	13.75
1946	Francisco Castro; Puerto Rico	14.14	Harold Lawson; Jamaica	14.14	Raúl López; Cuba	13.74
1950	Reinaldo Salamo; Puerto Rico	14.20A	Francisco Castro; Puerto Rico	14.10A	Benjamín Casado; Puerto Rico	13.57A
1954	Víctor Hernández; Cuba	14.86A	Claudio Cabreja; Cuba	14.51A	Gilberto Rondón; Puerto Rico	14.18A
1959	Pedro Camacho; Puerto Rico	14.67	Rumildo Cruz; Puerto Rico	14.38	Julio Lleras; Puerto Rico	14.32
1962	Mahoney Samuels; Jamaica	15.52	Ramón López; Cuba	15.33	Perry Christie; Bahamas	14.98
1966	Tim Barrett; Bahamas	15.76	José Hernández; Cuba	15.72	Trevor Thomas; Jamaica	15.42
1970	Pedro Pérez; Cuba	16.33	José Hernández; Cuba	15.79	Juan Velázquez; Cuba	15.61
1974	Pedro Pérez; Cuba	17.01w	Armando Herrera; Cuba	16.37w	Juvenal Pérez; Cuba	15.91
1978	Steve Hanna; Bahamas	16.60	Juan Velázquez; Cuba	16.43	Alejandro Herrera; Cuba	16.10
1982	Steve Hanna; Bahamas	16.73	Lázaro Betancourt; Cuba	16.64	Jorge Reyna; Cuba	16.61
1986	Lázaro Betancourt; Cuba	16.83	Frank Rutherford; Bahamas	16.67	Norbert Elliott; Bahamas	16.40
1990	Lázaro Betancourt; Cuba	16.66A	Juan Miguel López; Cuba	16.50A	Sergio Saavedra; Venezuela	16.18A
1993	Yoelbi Quesada; Cuba	17.06	Daniel Osorio; Cuba	16.52	Sergio Saavedra; Venezuela	16.30
1998	Yoelbi Quesada; Cuba	17.18	Aliecer Urrutia; Cuba	16.53	Iván Salcedo; Mexico	16.10
2002	Alvin Rentería; Colombia	15.57	Jhonny Rodríguez; Venezuela	15.42	Wayne McSween; Grenada	15.12
2006	Yoandri Betanzos; Cuba	17.46 GR	Alexis Copello; Cuba	16.85	Wilbert Walker; Jamaica	16.35
2010	Leevan Sands; Bahamas	17.21 m	Randy Lewis; Grenada	17.20 m	Samyr Lainé; Haiti	17.01 m
2014	Ernesto Revé; Cuba	16.94 m (w: -0.1 m/s)	Lázaro Martínez; Cuba	16.91 m (w: -0.6 m/s)	Yordanys Durañona; Dominica	16.67 m (w: -0.4 m/s)
2018	Cristian Nápoles; Cuba	17.34 m PB	Jordan Díaz; Cuba	17.29 m w	Miguel van Assen; Suriname	16.96 m NR

=== Shot put ===
Games	Gold		Silver		Bronze	
1926	Pedro Rodríguez; Cuba	11.65A	Jesús Aguirre; Mexico	11.30A	Ricardo Villar; Cuba	11.30A
1930	Juan Mendizabal; Cuba	12.25	Armando Rodríguez; Honduras	12.10	Ricardo Villar; Cuba	11.92
1935	Fernando Torres; Puerto Rico	12.84	Ignacio Vázquez; Cuba	12.18	Raúl Urquijo; Mexico	11.99
1938	Antulio Pietri; Puerto Rico	13.50	Fernando Torres; Puerto Rico	13.30	Ian Murphy; Puerto Rico	13.08
1946	Eduardo Adriana; Netherlands Antilles	13.35	Carlos Cervantes; Cuba	13.28	Luis Betancourt; Cuba	13.03
1950	Israel Capavete; Puerto Rico	13.78A	Eduardo Adriana; Netherlands Antilles	13.67A	Gerardo de Villiers; Cuba	13.23A
1954	Ramón Rosario; Puerto Rico	14.46A	Eduardo Adriana; Netherlands Antilles	14.45A	Rafael Trompiz; Venezuela	14.38A
1959	Eduardo Adriana; Netherlands Antilles	14.59	Ramón Rosario; Puerto Rico	14.48	Rafael Trompiz; Venezuela	14.00
1962	Lambertus Rebel; Netherlands Antilles	14.64	Héctor Thomas; Venezuela	14.46	Ramón Rosario; Puerto Rico	13.96
1966	Fidel Estrada; Cuba	15.36	Roy Hollingsworth; Trinidad and Tobago	15.36	Benigno Hodelín; Cuba	15.34
1970	Benigno Hodelín; Cuba	16.46	Silván Hemming; Cuba	16.29	Modesto Mederos; Cuba	15.28
1974	José Carreño; Venezuela	16.20	Nicolás Hernández; Cuba	16.09	Pedro Serrano; Puerto Rico	15.85
1978	Humberto Calvario; Cuba	17.51	Nicolás Hernández; Cuba	17.36	Jesús Ramos; Venezuela	16.83
1982	Luis Delís; Cuba	18.88	Radai Mendoza; Puerto Rico	16.21	Paul Ruiz; Cuba	16.14
1986	Paul Ruiz; Cuba	19.01	Marciso Boué; Cuba	18.59	Hubert Maingot; Trinidad and Tobago	16.99
1990	Paul Ruiz; Cuba	18.93A	Marciso Boué; Cuba	18.26A	Samuel Crespo; Puerto Rico	16.60A
1993	Jorge Montenegro; Cuba	18.88	Carlos Fandiño; Cuba	18.68	Yojer Medina; Venezuela	17.96
1998	Yojer Medina; Venezuela	19.42	Yosvany Obregón; Cuba	18.30	Orlando Ibarra; Colombia	17.52
2002	Yojer Medina; Venezuela	19.63	Manuel Repollet; Puerto Rico	16.93	José Ventura; Dominican Republic	16.46
2006	Dorian Scott; Jamaica	20.34 NR	Alexis Paumier; Cuba	18.26	Reynaldo Proenza; Cuba	18.03
2010	Dorian Scott; Jamaica	18.92 m	O'Dayne Richards; Jamaica	18.74 m	Eder Moreno; Colombia	18.45 m
2014	Mario Cota; Mexico	19.30 m	Stephen Sáenz; Mexico	19.27 m	Raymond Brown; Jamaica	18.30 m
2018	O'Dayne Richards; Jamaica	21.02 m GR	Ashinia Miller; Jamaica	20.19 m	Eldred Henry; British Virgin Islands	20.18 m NR

=== Discus throw ===
Games	Gold		Silver		Bronze	
1926	Manuel Guzmán; Mexico	35.79A	Miguel Gutiérrez; Cuba	35.46A	Jesús Aguirre; Mexico	34.43A
1930	Miguel Gutiérrez; Cuba	41.12	René de la Torre; Cuba	34.35	Rafael Martínez; Cuba	34.31
1935	Miguel Gutiérrez; Cuba	38.83	Heriberto Alonso; Cuba	38.38	Francisco Robledo; Mexico	38.04
1938	Ian Murphy; Puerto Rico	42.42	Heriberto Alonso; Cuba	40.73	Miguel Gutiérrez; Cuba	40.47
1946	Manuel Seoane; Puerto Rico	39.94	Mauricio Rodríguez; Venezuela	39.86	Carlos Pérez; Mexico	38.69
1950	Eduardo Parera; Cuba	40.54A	Manuel Seoane; Puerto Rico	38.88A	Juan Luyanda; Puerto Rico	37.75A
1954	Mauricio Rodríguez; Venezuela	40.14A	Alfonso Cruz; Mexico	39.00A	Heriberto Alonso; Cuba	38.87A
1959	Daniel Cereali; Venezuela	44.95	Mauricio Rodríguez; Venezuela	42.27	Omar Fierro; Mexico	42.16
1962	Dagoberto González; Colombia	48.66	Lambertus Rebel; Netherlands Antilles	47.44	Daniel Cereali; Venezuela	46.97
1966	Roy Hollingsworth; Trinidad and Tobago	52.10	Javier Moreno; Cuba	48.71	Dagoberto González; Colombia	48.16
1970	Bárbaro Cañizares; Cuba	56.04	Dagoberto González; Colombia	54.48	Javier Moreno; Cuba	53.64
1974	Julián Morrinson; Cuba	58.10	Javier Moreno; Cuba	51.04	Ignacio Reinosa; Puerto Rico	49.30
1978	Luis Delís; Cuba	58.62	Julián Morrinson; Cuba	58.56	Brad Cooper; Bahamas	54.24
1982	Luis Delís; Cuba	70.20	Brad Cooper; Bahamas	66.72	Juan Martínez; Cuba	62.82
1986	Luis Delís; Cuba	63.16	Juan Martínez; Cuba	62.30	Brad Cooper; Bahamas	61.40
1990	Roberto Moya; Cuba	64.64A	Gabriel Pedroso; Cuba	59.44A	James Dedier; Trinidad and Tobago	53.40A
1993	Alexis Elizalde; Cuba	61.24	Luis Delís; Cuba	59.32	Yojer Medina; Venezuela	54.94
1998	Alexis Elizalde; Cuba	65.00	Frank Casañas; Cuba	59.38	Alfredo Romero; Puerto Rico	50.83
2002	Héctor Hurtado; Venezuela	55.43	Alfredo Romero; Puerto Rico	52.87	Yojer Medina; Venezuela	51.98
2006	Yunio Lastre; Cuba	57.00	Jason Morgan; Jamaica	56.56	Héctor Hurtado; Venezuela	52.60
2010	Jason Morgan; Jamaica	59.43 m	Jesús Parejo; Venezuela	54.88 m	Mario Cota; Mexico	54.70 m
2014	Jorge Yedián Fernández; Cuba	63.17 m	Mauricio Ortega; Colombia	60.69 m	Mario Cota; Mexico	58.21 m
2018	Mauricio Ortega; Colombia	66.30 m NR	Jorge Yedián Fernández; Cuba	65.27 m SB	Traves Smikle; Jamaica	64.68 m

=== Hammer throw ===
Games	Gold		Silver		Bronze	
1926	Troadio Hernández; Cuba	36.07A	Abel Salazar; Mexico	35.73A	Jesús Aguirre; Mexico	35.43A
1930	Francisco Robledo; Mexico	41.05	Troadio Hernández; Cuba	40.98	Oswaldo Duyos; Cuba	36.84
1935	Francisco Robledo; Mexico	43.52	Juan Prera; Guatemala	39.08	Bernabé Sánchez; Cuba	38.38
1938	Bernabé Sánchez; Cuba	39.85	Francisco González; Mexico	38.18	Ignacio Vázquez; Cuba	37.45
1946	Francisco González; Mexico	41.87	Luis Betancourt; Cuba	39.71	Lorenzo Barquín; Cuba	39.70
1950	Jaime Annexy; Puerto Rico	45.87A	Vicente Lagoyete; Colombia	42.64A	Julio Bordás; Cuba	42.08A
1954	Luis Betancourt; Cuba	46.96A	Jaime Annexy; Puerto Rico	46.82A	Enrique Lagoyete; Colombia	45.19A
1959	Daniel Cereali; Venezuela	51.17dh	Rubén Dávila; Puerto Rico	46.86dh	Francisco Fragoso; Mexico	46.75dh
1962	Enrique Samuells; Cuba	54.15	Daniel Cereali; Venezuela	52.85	Marcelino Borrero; Colombia	50.35
1966	Enrique Samuells; Cuba	68.11	Adolfo Martín; Cuba	56.59	Marcelino Borrero; Colombia	52.38
1970	Víctor Suárez; Cuba	57.06	Pedro Granell; Puerto Rico	53.74	Jesús Ulloa; Cuba	52.26
1974	Pedro Garbey; Cuba	61.50	Víctor Suárez; Cuba	59.16	Genovevo Morejón; Cuba	57.58
1978	Armando Orozco; Cuba	69.86	Genovevo Morejón; Cuba	69.14	Luis Martínez; Puerto Rico	56.22
1982	Genovevo Morejón; Cuba	67.10	Alfredo Luis; Cuba	66.14	Andrés Polemil; Dominican Republic	56.14
1986	Vicente Sánchez; Cuba	68.04	Eladio Hernández; Cuba	64.08	David Castrillón; Colombia	63.68
1990	Eladio Hernández; Cuba	70.75A	Guillermo Guzmán; Mexico	68.18A	René Díaz; Cuba	66.62A
1993	Alberto Sánchez; Cuba	72.20	Eladio Hernández; Cuba	69.58	Guillermo Guzmán; Mexico	65.52
1998	Alberto Sánchez; Cuba	74.25	Yosvany Suárez; Cuba	69.35	Guillermo Guzmán; Mexico	63.78
2002	Raúl Rivera; Guatemala	65.99	Santos Vega; Puerto Rico	65.35	Aldo Bello; Venezuela	65.35
2006	Noleysi Bicet; Cuba	69.56	Yosvany Suárez; Cuba	67.62	Aldo Bello; Venezuela	62.55
2010	Aldo Bello; Venezuela	65.10 m	Jean Rosario; Puerto Rico	63.31 m	Pedro Muñoz; Venezuela	63.03 m
2014	Roberto Janet; Cuba	74.11 m	Reinier Mejías; Cuba	71.81 m	Roberto Sawyers; Costa Rica	70.66 m
2018	Diego del Real; Mexico	74.95 m GR	Rainier Mejías; Cuba	73.28 m	Roberto Janet; Cuba	73.11 m

=== Javelin throw ===
Games	Gold		Silver		Bronze	
1926	Luis Lewis; Cuba	52.15A	Luis Estévez; Cuba	48.34A	Gustavo Gallardo; Mexico	45.18A
1930	Porfirio Espinosa; Cuba	50.57	Cándido González; Cuba	50.30	Mario Robau; Cuba	49.53
1935	Tito Figueroa; Puerto Rico	59.32	Alfredo Piedra; Cuba	50.45	Mario Salas; Cuba	50.31
1938	Tito Figueroa; Puerto Rico	64.11	Mario Salas; Cuba	58.76	Wilfredo Benítez; Mexico	56.43
1946	Mario Salas; Cuba	55.00	Enrique Pizarro; Puerto Rico	54.18	Nicolás Romero; Puerto Rico	52.75
1950	Enrique Pizarro; Puerto Rico	56.67A	Mario Salas; Cuba	55.74A	Emilio Romero; Puerto Rico	55.57A
1954	Reinaldo Oliver; Puerto Rico	67.71A	Carlos Fajer; Mexico	61.79A	Guillermo Pasalacqua; Puerto Rico	54.97A
1959	Carlos Fajer; Mexico	62.36	Santiago Durham; Mexico	59.65	Jesús Barbera; Venezuela	59.02
1962	Jesús Rodríguez; Venezuela	66.66	Wilfredo Salgado; Puerto Rico	64.24	Arnoldo Pallarés; Cuba	61.83
1966	Justo Perelló; Cuba	74.74	Francisco Mena; Cuba	69.57	Jesús Rodríguez; Venezuela	68.59
1970	Amado Morales; Puerto Rico	76.40	Don Vélez; Nicaragua	72.12	Justo Perelló; Cuba	70.52
1974	Raúl Fernández; Cuba	75.30	Juan Jarvis; Cuba	69.16	Salomón Robbins; Mexico	67.10
1978	Antonio González; Cuba	78.74	Amado Morales; Puerto Rico	70.54	Reinaldo Patterson; Cuba	63.64
1982	Dionisio Quintana; Cuba	82.40	Amado Morales; Puerto Rico	79.36	Antonio González; Cuba	74.86
1986	Ramón González; Cuba	77.32	Juan de la Garza; Mexico	74.28	Máximo Driggs; Cuba	74.06
1990	Ramón González; Cuba	78.86A	Juan de la Garza; Mexico	76.60A	Kirt Thompson; Trinidad and Tobago	75.38A
1993	Luis Lucumí; Colombia	74.58	Ovidio Trimiño; Cuba	73.08	Emeterio González; Cuba	71.24
1998	Emeterio González; Cuba	80.92	Isbel Luaces; Cuba	78.96	Edwin Cuesta; Venezuela	75.41
2002	Manuel Fuenmayor; Venezuela	75.32	Noraldo Palacios; Colombia	75.11	Ronald Noguera; Venezuela	74.91
2006	Guillermo Martínez; Cuba	84.91 GR	Yudel Moreno; Cuba	78.44	Noraldo Palacios; Colombia	74.10
2010	Arley Ibargüen; Colombia	78.93 m	Dayron Márquez; Colombia	76.31 m	Juan José Méndez; Mexico	76.03 m
2014	Guillermo Martínez; Cuba	79.27 m	Juan José Méndez; Mexico	76.80 m	Osmany Laffita; Cuba	76.28 m
2018	Keshorn Walcott; Trinidad and Tobago	84.47 m	Anderson Peters; Grenada	81.80 m	David Carreón; Mexico	76.27 m

=== Pentathlon ===
Games	Gold		Silver		Bronze	
1930	Alberto Fernández; Cuba	3051	Fernando Navarro; Panama	2846	Miguel Gutiérrez; Cuba	2789
1935	Felipe Orellana; Guatemala	3231	Gilberto González; Puerto Rico	3179	Manuel Suárez; Cuba	2852
1938	Salvador Torrós; Puerto Rico	3459	Manuel Suárez; Cuba	3158	Juan Luyanda; Puerto Rico	3097
1946	Néstor Marchany; Puerto Rico	3374	Amador Terán; Mexico	3294	Víctor Castañeda; El Salvador	3131
1950	Amador Terán; Mexico	2944A	Víctor Castañeda; El Salvador	2779A	Enrique Salazar; Guatemala	2560A
1954	Brígido Iriarte; Venezuela	2748A	Héctor Román; Puerto Rico	2597A	Reinaldo Oliver; Puerto Rico	2494A
1959	Rodolfo Mijares; Mexico	2723	Héctor Román; Puerto Rico	2627	Héctor Thomas; Venezuela	2540
1962	Héctor Thomas; Venezuela	3212	Roberto Caravaca; Venezuela	2946	Jorge García; Puerto Rico	2912
1966	Jorge García; Puerto Rico	3153	Francisco Mena; Cuba	3467	Ramón Iriarte; Venezuela	3389

=== Decathlon ===
Games	Gold		Silver		Bronze	
1970	Jesús Mirabal; Cuba	6997	José Díaz; Cuba	6934	Héctor Thomas; Venezuela	6918
1974	Jesús Mirabal; Cuba	7470	Rigoberto Salazar; Cuba	7305	Orlando Pedroso; Cuba	7060
1978	Rigoberto Salazar; Cuba	7483	Miguel Subarnaba; Cuba	6954	José Montezuma; Venezuela	6842
1982	Liston Bochette; Puerto Rico	7349	Guillermo Sánchez; Mexico	7345	Carlos Palacios; Cuba	7236
1986	Ernesto Betancourt; Cuba	7333	Jorge Caraballo; Cuba	7079	Ron McPhee; Bahamas	6773
1990	Miguel Valle; Cuba	7448A	Ernesto Betancourt; Cuba	7278A	Antonio Greene; Bahamas	7118A
1993	Eugenio Balanqué; Cuba	7889	Raúl Duany; Cuba	7715	José Román; Puerto Rico	7262
1998	Raúl Duany; Cuba	8118	Eugenio Balanqué; Cuba	8090	Diógenes Estévez; Venezuela	7237
2006	Alexis Chivás; Cuba	7551	Carlos Paterson; Cuba	7203	Andrés Horacio Mantilla; Colombia	7157
2010	Maurice Smith; Jamaica	8109 pts	Steven Marrero; Puerto Rico	7506 pts PB	Marcos Sanchez; Puerto Rico	7311 pts
2014	Yordanis García; Cuba	7854 pts	José Ángel Mendieta; Cuba	7517 pts	Roman Garibay; Mexico	7243 pts
2018	Leonel Suárez; Cuba	8026 pts	José Lemos; Colombia	7913 pts NR	Briander Rivero; Cuba	7858 pts

=== Half marathon ===
Games	Gold		Silver		Bronze	
1946	Doroteo Flores; Guatemala	01:14:33	Luis Velásquez; Guatemala	01:14:39	Rafael Flores; El Salvador	01:15:38
1950	Luis Velásquez; Guatemala	1:14:44A	Doroteo Flores; Guatemala	1:15:41A	Gustavo Ramírez; Colombia	1:17:14A
1954	Doroteo Flores; Guatemala	1:15:20A	Gustavo Ramírez; Colombia	1:19:00A	Guillermo Rojas; Guatemala	1:19:01A
1959	Pedro Peralta; Mexico	01:10:29	Pedro Alvarado; Mexico	01:11:47	Germán Lozano; Colombia	01:13:40
1962	Hernán Barreneche; Colombia	01:11:49	Fidel Negrete; Mexico	01:12:27	Víctor Peralta; Mexico	01:13:21
1966	Valentín Robles; Mexico	01:13:47	Pedro Cárdenas; Colombia	01:14:24	Antonio Ibarra; Mexico	01:17:01

=== Marathon ===
Games	Gold		Silver		Bronze	
1938	José Thompson; Panama	03:01:04	Estanislao Galicia; Mexico		Hilario Hernández; Mexico	
1970	Alfredo Peñaloza; Mexico	02:47:23	Antonio Capote; Cuba	02:48:59	Patricio Larriñaga; Cuba	02:50:38
1974	Gilberto Serna; Colombia	02:28:08	Agustín Reyes; Puerto Rico	02:32:08	José Jesús; Puerto Rico	02:32:54
1978	Radamés Vega; Puerto Rico	2:22:34	Mario Cuevas; Mexico	2:23:07	José Granajo; Guatemala	2:26:04
1982	Jorge González; Puerto Rico	02:26:40	Radamés González; Cuba	02:28:12	Miguel Cruz; Mexico	02:30:37
1986	Jesús Amariles; Colombia	02:23:00	Radamés González; Cuba	02:25:54	Dieudonné LaMothe; Haiti	02:32:11
1990	Jorge González; Puerto Rico	2:18:55A	César Mercado; Puerto Rico	2:18:59A	Oscar Mejías; Venezuela	2:19:41A
1993	Benjamín Paredes; Mexico	02:14:23	Julio Hernández; Colombia	02:17:21	Samuel López; Mexico	02:17:38
1998	Juan Camacho; Mexico	02:25:25	William Ramírez; Colombia	02:25:33	Rubén Maza; Venezuela	02:27:46
2002	Procopio Franco; Mexico	02:17:38	Luis Fonseca; Venezuela	02:20:13	Juan Carlos Cardona; Colombia	02:21:27
2006	Procopio Franco; Mexico	2:24:35	Juan Carlos Cardona; Colombia	2:27:43	Alfredo Arévalo; Guatemala	2:28:27
2010	José Amado García; Guatemala	2:21:35 PB	Carlos Cordero; Mexico	2:22:06	Juan Carlos Cardona; Colombia	2:22:35
2014	Richer Pérez; Cuba	2:19:13	José Amado García; Guatemala	2:19:45	Daniel de Jesús Vargas; Mexico	2:20:27
2018	Jeison Suárez; Colombia	2:29:54	Daniel Vargas; Mexico	2:30:30	Williams Julajuj; Guatemala	2:31:42

=== 10km walk ===
Games	Gold		Silver		Bronze	
1966	José Pedraza; Mexico	51:32.4	Euclides Calzado; Cuba	51:43.4	David Jiménez; Cuba	52:17.8

=== 20km walk ===
Games	Gold		Silver		Bronze	
1970	Eladio Campos; Mexico	1:41:14	Francisco Chávez; Mexico	1:43:19	Lucas Lara; Cuba	1:44:38
1974	Raúl González; Mexico	1:35:23	Pedro Aroche; Mexico	1:35:33	Ernesto Alfaro; Colombia	1:38:53
1978	Daniel Bautista; Mexico	1:29:10	Raúl González; Mexico	1:31:58	Jorge Quiñones; Colombia	1:39:31
1982	Ernesto Canto; Mexico	1:29:22	Raúl González; Mexico	1:31:27	Alfredo Garrido; Cuba	1:39:00
1986	Ernesto Canto; Mexico	1:26:25	Martín Bermúdez; Mexico	1:27:23	Héctor Moreno; Colombia	1:28:41
1990	Ernesto Canto; Mexico	1:23:52A	Carlos Mercenario; Mexico	1:24:03A	Héctor Moreno; Colombia	1:24:54A
1993	Daniel García; Mexico	1:26:22	Héctor Moreno; Colombia	1:26:32	Julio Martínez; Guatemala	1:29:43
1998	Daniel García; Mexico	1:23:32	Bernardo Segura; Mexico	1:24:31	Julio Martínez; Guatemala	1:25:31
2002	Alejandro López; Mexico	1:26:32	Luis Fernando García; Guatemala	1:27:51	Fredy Hernández; Colombia	1:28:48
2006	Luis Fernando López; Colombia	1:24:20	Eder Sánchez; Mexico	1:26:30	Luis Fernando García; Guatemala	1:29:50
2010	Eder Sánchez; Mexico	1:22:32 GR	Luis Fernando López; Colombia	1:22:55	Gustavo Restrepo; Colombia	1:22:56 PB
2014	Horacio Nava; Mexico	1:25:05	Éider Arévalo; Colombia	1:26:03	José Leonardo Montaña; Colombia	1:27:30
2018	Éider Arévalo; Colombia	1:26:42	Manuel Soto; Colombia	1:26:59	Erick Barrondo; Guatemala	1:27:17

=== 50km walk ===
Games	Gold		Silver		Bronze	
1982	Félix Gómez; Mexico	4:05:03	Raúl González; Mexico	4:10:34	David Castro; Cuba	4:43:53
1986	Martín Bermúdez; Mexico	4:04:47	Félix Gómez; Mexico	4:07:20	Mauricio Cortés; Colombia	4:26:27
1990	Héctor Moreno; Colombia	4:06:04A	Edel Oliva; Cuba	4:10:19A	Orlando Díaz; Colombia	4:15:45A
1993	Edel Oliva; Cuba	3:55:21	Germán Sánchez; Mexico	3:56:18	Julio César Urías; Guatemala	4:03:24
1998	Ignacio Zamudio; Mexico	3:58:15	Hugo López; Guatemala	4:06:55	Jorge Luis Pino; Cuba	4:07:52
2010	Horacio Nava; Mexico	3:56:46	Rodrigo Moreno; Colombia	4:11:42	Cristian Berdeja; Mexico	4:32:51
2014	Erick Barrondo; Guatemala	3:49:40 GR	Omar Zepeda; Mexico	3:52:45	Cristian Berdeja; Mexico	3:53:39
2018	José Leyver Ojeda; Mexico	4:02:45	Jorge Armando Ruiz; Colombia	4:05:28	José Leonardo Montaña; Colombia	4:08:10

== Women's medalists ==
=== 50 metres ===
Games	Gold		Silver		Bronze	
1946	Dolores Worrell; Panama	6.4	Cynthia Thompson; Jamaica	6.5	Hyacinth Walters; Jamaica	6.8
1950	Hyacinth Walters; Jamaica	6.7A	Cynthia Thompson; Jamaica	6.8A	Graviola Ewing; Guatemala	6.9A

=== 100 metres ===
Games	Gold		Silver		Bronze	
1938	Nola Thorne; Panama	12.6	Nilda Villaverde; Panama	12.6e	Adela Montilla; Panama	12.7e
1946	Cynthia Thompson; Jamaica	12.1	Emilia Foster; Panama	12.7	Dolores Worrell; Panama	12.7
1950	Hyacinth Walters; Jamaica	12.3A	Cynthia Thompson; Jamaica	12.4A	Graviola Ewing; Guatemala	12.5A
1954	Carlota Gooden; Panama	12.32A	Hyacinth Walters; Jamaica	12.34A	Julia Díaz; Cuba	12.52A
1959	Jean Holmes; Panama	13.04	Yolanda Vinocourt; Mexico	13.31	María Treviño; Mexico	13.33
1962	Miguelina Cobián; Cuba	12.08	Marcela Daniel; Panama	12.12	Sybil Donmartin; Trinidad and Tobago	12.20
1966	Miguelina Cobián; Cuba	11.7 /11.69?	Cristina Hechavarria; Cuba	11.9 /11.79?	Carmen Smith; Jamaica	11.9 /11.86?
1970	Miguelina Cobián; Cuba	11.4w	Fulgencia Romay; Cuba	11.6w	Cristina Hechavarria; Cuba	11.6w
1974	Carmen Valdés; Cuba	11.55	Silvia Chivás; Cuba	11.65	Leleith Hodges; Jamaica	11.75
1978	Silvia Chivás; Cuba	11.47	Leleith Hodges; Jamaica	11.63	Isabel Taylor; Cuba	11.74
1982	Luisa Ferrer; Cuba	11.55	Janice Bernard; Trinidad and Tobago	11.57	Marie Lande Mathieu; Puerto Rico	11.63
1986	Pauline Davis-Thompson; Bahamas	11.51	Camille Coates; Jamaica	11.69	Amparo Caicedo; Colombia	11.85
1990	Liliana Allen; Cuba	11.33Aw	Heather Samuel; Antigua and Barbuda	11.73Aw	María Quiñones; Colombia	11.86Aw
1993	Liliana Allen; Cuba	11.52	Miriam Ferrer; Cuba	11.81	Chandra Sturrup; Bahamas	11.89
1998	Chandra Sturrup; Bahamas	11.14	Beverly McDonald; Jamaica	11.36	Tayna Lawrence; Jamaica	11.53
2002	Liliana Allen; Mexico	11.34w	Heather Samuel; Antigua and Barbuda	11.44w	Melocia Clarke; Jamaica	11.57w
2006	Tahesia Harrigan; British Virgin Islands	11.15	Laverne Jones; U.S. Virgin Islands	11.50	Virgil Hodge; Saint Kitts and Nevis	11.52
2010	Tahesia Harrigan; British Virgin Islands	11.19	Ayanna Hutchinson; Trinidad and Tobago	11.47	Yomara Hinestroza; Colombia	11.51
2014	Andrea Purica; Venezuela	11.29	Nediam Vargas; Venezuela	11.43	LaVerne Jones; U.S. Virgin Islands	11.54
2018	Jonielle Smith; Jamaica	11.04	Khalifa St. Fort; Trinidad and Tobago	11.15	Andrea Purica; Venezuela	11.32

=== 200 metres ===
Games	Gold		Silver		Bronze	
1966	Una Morris; Jamaica	24.2	Miguelina Cobián; Cuba	24.8	Vilma Charlton; Jamaica	24.9
1970	Miguelina Cobián; Cuba	23.5	Violetta Quesada; Cuba	23.9	Fulgencia Romay; Cuba	24.3
1974	Carmen Valdés; Cuba	23.76	Asunción Acosta; Cuba	24.21	Diva Bishop; Panama	24.39
1978	Silvia Chivás; Cuba	23.01	Janice Bernard; Trinidad and Tobago	24.01	Maureen Gottshalk; Jamaica	24.42
1982	Luisa Ferrer; Cuba	23.44	Angela Williams; Trinidad and Tobago	23.75	Marie Lande Mathieu; Puerto Rico	23.83
1986	Pauline Davis-Thompson; Bahamas	23.06	Camille Coates; Jamaica	23.44	Amparo Caicedo; Colombia	23.52
1990	Liliana Allen; Cuba	23.27A	Norfalia Carabalí; Colombia	23.75A	Heather Samuel; Antigua and Barbuda	24.33A
1993	Liliana Allen; Cuba	23.14	Idalmis Bonne; Cuba	23.53	Ximena Restrepo; Colombia	23.88
1998	Beverly McDonald; Jamaica	22.30w	Juliet Cuthbert; Jamaica	22.63w	Felipa Palacios; Colombia	23.07w
2002	Liliana Allen; Mexico	23.34	Norma González; Colombia	23.73	Heather Samuel; Antigua and Barbuda	24.13
2006	Roxana Díaz; Cuba	22.76 GR	Virgil Hodge; Saint Kitts and Nevis	23.09	Jade Bailey; Barbados	23.32
2010	Cydonie Mothersille; Cayman Islands	22.91 GR	Carol Rodríguez; Puerto Rico	23.37	Darlenys Obregón; Colombia	23.76
2014	Nercely Soto; Venezuela	23.14	María Alejandra Idrobo; Colombia	23.52	Allison Peter; U.S. Virgin Islands	23.54
2018	Shashalee Forbes; Jamaica	22.80 SB	Semoy Hackett; Trinidad and Tobago	22.95	Jodean Williams; Jamaica	22.96

=== 400 metres ===
Games	Gold		Silver		Bronze	
1970	Carmen Trustée; Cuba	52.5	Aurelia Pentón; Cuba	54.3	Marcela Chivás; Cuba	55.1
1974	Aurelia Pentón; Cuba	52.27	Carmen Trustée; Cuba	52.91	Asunción Acosta; Cuba	53.92
1978	Aurelia Pentón; Cuba	50.56	Beatriz Castillo; Cuba	51.27	Helen Blake; Jamaica	53.40
1982	June Griffith; Guyana	51.89	Mercedes Álvarez; Cuba	52.32	Cathy Rattray; Jamaica	52.39
1986	Ana Fidelia Quirot; Cuba	51.01	Norfalia Carabalí; Colombia	52.46	Cathy Rattray; Jamaica	52.67
1990	Ana Fidelia Quirot; Cuba	51.70A	Norfalia Carabalí; Colombia	52.57A	Nancy McLeón; Cuba	55.29A
1993	Julia Duporty; Cuba	51.81	Zoila Stewart; Costa Rica	52.57 (NR)	Nancy McLeón; Cuba	52.59
1998	Sandie Richards; Jamaica	51.27	Ana Guevara; Mexico	51.32	Norfalia Carabalí; Colombia	51.52
2002	Ana Guevara; Mexico	51.87	Eliana Pacheco; Venezuela	53.18	Clara Hernández; Dominican Republic	53.81
2006	Ana Guevara; Mexico	50.99	Hazel-Ann Regis; Grenada	51.16	Kineke Alexander; Saint Vincent and the Grenadines	52.04
2010	Christine Amertil; Bahamas	52.16 SB	Aliann Pompey; Guyana	52.33	Tiandra Ponteen; Saint Kitts and Nevis	52.75
2014	Lisneidys Inés Veitía; Cuba	51.72	Daisiuramis Bonne; Cuba	52.49	Jennifer Padilla; Colombia	52.95
2018	Tiffany James; Jamaica	52.35	Fiordaliza Cofil; Dominican Republic	52.72 PB	Derri-Ann Hill; Jamaica	53.30

=== 800 metres ===
Games	Gold		Silver		Bronze	
1970	Carmen Trustée; Cuba	2:14.8	Lucía Quiroz; Mexico	2:15.8	Rosalía Abadía; Panama	2:16.4
1974	Charlotte Bradley; Mexico	2:04.55	Aurelia Pentón; Cuba	2:05.43	Enriqueta Nava; Mexico	2:05.89
1978	Aurelia Pentón; Cuba	2:01.38	Charlotte Bradley; Mexico	2:03.58	Nery McKeen; Cuba	2:04.48
1982	Nery McKeen; Cuba	2:04.22	Angelita Lind; Puerto Rico	2:04.24	María Ribeaux; Cuba	2:04.47
1986	Ana Fidelia Quirot; Cuba	1:59.00	Angelita Lind; Puerto Rico	2:02.12	Imelda González; Mexico	2:02.26
1990	Ana Fidelia Quirot; Cuba	2:04.85A	Letitia Vriesde; Suriname	2:04.97A	Jennifer Fisher; Bermuda	2:09.52A
1993	Letitia Vriesde; Suriname	2:04.28	Ana Fidelia Quirot; Cuba	2:05.22	Daisy Ocasio; Puerto Rico	2:06.52
1998	Letitia Vriesde; Suriname	2:00.24	Ana Guevara; Mexico	2:01.12 (NR)	Mardrea Hyman; Jamaica	2:01.46
2002	Letitia Vriesde; Suriname	2:04.50	Lizaira Del Valle; Puerto Rico	2:06.09	Gabriela Medina; Mexico	2:06.55
2006	Zulia Calatayud; Cuba	2:05.26	Rosibel García; Colombia	2:05.78	Gabriela Medina; Mexico	2:06.15
2010	Rosibel García; Colombia	2:03.77	Andrea Ferris; Panama	2:04.16	Marian Burnett; Guyana	2:04.45
2014	Rose Mary Almanza; Cuba	2:00.79	Cristina Guevara; Mexico	2:01.68	Gabriela Medina; Mexico	2:02.36
2018	Rose Mary Almanza; Cuba	2:01.63	Alena Brooks; Trinidad and Tobago	2:02.26	Sonia Gaskin; Barbados	2:03.13 NR

=== 1500 metres ===
Games	Gold		Silver		Bronze	
1978	Charlotte Bradley; Mexico	4:30.78	Ileana Hocking; Puerto Rico	4:35.88	Susana Herrera; Mexico	4:39.62
1982	Angelita Lind; Puerto Rico	4:25.94	Sergia Martínez; Cuba	4:26.69	Alicia Diffourt; Cuba	4:27.96
1986	Angelita Lind; Puerto Rico	4:18.67	Imelda González; Mexico	4:19.58	Nery McKeen; Cuba	4:23.34
1990	Letitia Vriesde; Suriname	4:26.28A	María Luisa Servín; Mexico	4:29.03A	Jennifer Fisher; Bermuda	4:57.25A
1993	Letitia Vriesde; Suriname	4:18.45	Isabel Juárez; Mexico	4:20.20	Susana A. Díaz; Mexico	4:21.45
1998	Mardrea Hyman; Jamaica	4:27.03	Nora Rocha; Mexico	4:27.74	Yanelis Lara; Cuba	4:29.43
2002	Dulce Rodríguez; Mexico	4:18.91	Korene Hinds; Jamaica	4:22.03	Bertha Sánchez; Colombia	4:27.75
2006	Rosibel García; Colombia	4:18.29 GR	Yusneysi Santiusti; Cuba	4:19.32	Lysaira del Valle; Puerto Rico	4:21.84
2010	Rosibel García; Colombia	4:21.17	Pilar McShine; Trinidad and Tobago	4:21.66	Beverly Ramos; Puerto Rico	4:22.02
2014	Muriel Coneo; Colombia	4:14.84 GR	Cristina Guevara; Mexico	4:16.51	Adriana Muñoz; Cuba	4:20.50
2018	Rose Mary Almanza; Cuba	4:22.14 SB	Angelín Figueroa; Puerto Rico	4:22.52	Rosibel García; Colombia	4:23.43 SB

=== 3000 m ===
Games	Gold		Silver		Bronze	
1982	Sergia Martínez; Cuba	9:37.32	Marisela Rivero; Venezuela	9:38.40	María Cuesta; Cuba	9:41.66
1986	Fabiola Rueda; Colombia	9:30.25	Sergia Martínez; Cuba	9:36.84	Santa Velázquez; Mexico	9:42.36
1990	María del Carmen Díaz; Mexico	9:30.09A	María Luisa Servín; Mexico	9:38.08A	Vilma Peña; Costa Rica	10:37.00A
1993	Isabel Juárez; Mexico	9:16.27	Adriana Fernández; Mexico	9:18.93	Milagro Rodríguez; Cuba	9:22.36

=== 3000 m steeplechase ===
Games	Gold		Silver		Bronze	
2010	Beverly Ramos; Puerto Rico	9:59.03 GR/PB	Ángela Figueroa; Colombia	10:18.28	Sandra Lopez Reyes; Mexico	10:18.88 PB
2014	Ángela Figueroa; Colombia	10:05.25	Muriel Coneo; Colombia	10:07.94	Beverly Ramos; Puerto Rico	10:08.39
2018	Ana Cristina Narváez; Mexico	10:00.01 SB	Beverly Ramos; Puerto Rico	10:07.71	Andrea Ferris; Panama	10:18.92 SB

=== 5000 metres ===
Games	Gold		Silver		Bronze	
1998	Nora Rocha; Mexico	16:43.48	Adriana Fernández; Mexico	16:44.60	Bertha Sánchez; Colombia	16:51.89
2002	Dulce Rodríguez; Mexico	16:38.92	Bertha Sánchez; Colombia	16:39.23	Nora Rocha; Mexico	16:42.18
2006	Bertha Sánchez; Colombia	16:17:13	Dulce Rodríguez; Mexico	16:18.15	Madaí Pérez; Mexico	16:19.38
2010	Beverly Ramos; Puerto Rico	16:09.82 GR	Rachael Marchand; Puerto Rico	16:13.59	Yolanda Caballero; Colombia	16:14.75
2014	Brenda Flores; Mexico	16:02.64 GR	Sandra López; Mexico	16:13.23	Yudileyvis Castillo; Cuba	16:16.21
2018	Muriel Coneo; Colombia	16:13.47	Beverly Ramos; Puerto Rico	16:14.04	Brenda Flores; Mexico	16:16.71 SB

=== 10,000 metres ===
Games	Gold		Silver		Bronze	
1986	Genoveva Domínguez; Mexico	36:24.39	Maricela Hurtado; Mexico	36:29.12	Maribel Durruty; Cuba	38:20.27
1990	María del Carmen Díaz; Mexico	35:27.68A	Santa Velázquez; Mexico	35:53.36A	Vilma Peña; Costa Rica	37:32.53A
1993	María del Carmen Díaz; Mexico	34:49.67	Lucía Rendón; Mexico	35:13.30	Carmen Serrano; Puerto Rico	36:19.66
1998	Adriana Fernández; Mexico	34:04.16	Lucía Mendiola; Mexico	35:27.63	Yailén García; Cuba	36:12.72
2010	Yolanda Caballero; Colombia	34:50.58	María Elena Valencia; Mexico	34:52.66	Rachael Marchand; Puerto Rico	34:55.79
2014	Brenda Flores; Mexico	35:54.44	Kathya García; Mexico	36:23.32	Yudileyvis Castillo; Cuba	36:29.04
2018	Úrsula Sánchez; Mexico	33:41.48 GR	Beverly Ramos; Puerto Rico	33:46.99 SB	Vianey de la Rosa; Mexico	34:10.75

=== 80 metres hurdles ===
Games	Gold		Silver		Bronze	
1962	Bertha Díaz; Cuba	11.1	Lorraine Dunn; Panama	11.7	Carmen Smith; Jamaica	11.8

=== 100 metres hurdles ===
Games	Gold		Silver		Bronze	
1938	Nola Thorne; Panama	13.3	Aura Morales; Panama	13.6e	Nilda Villaverde; Panama	
1946	Josefine Lewis; Panama	12.5	Mavis Evelyn; Jamaica	12.7	Kathleen Russell; Jamaica	12.7
1950	Karleen Searchwell; Jamaica	12.1Aw	Vinton Beckett; Jamaica	12.5Aw	Kathleen Russell; Jamaica	12.6Aw
1954	Amalia Yubi; Mexico	12.3A	Kathleen Russell; Jamaica	12.5A	Gloria Tait; Panama	13.0A
1959	Guillermina Peña; Mexico	12.87	Benilda Ascanio; Venezuela	12.92	Silvia Hunte; Panama	13.43
1966	Carmen Smith; Jamaica	11.1	Doreldeen Pagan; Jamaica	11.6	Daisy Hechevarría; Cuba	11.6
1970	Marlene Elejarde; Cuba	13.9w	Lourdes Jones; Cuba	14.2w	Raquel Martínez; Cuba	14.5w
1974	Marlene Elejarde; Cuba	14.53	Mercedes Román; Mexico	14.69	Raquel Martínez; Cuba	14.74
1978	Grisel Machado; Cuba	13.31	Marisela Peralta; Dominican Republic	14.23	Carmen Zamora; Cuba	14.29
1982	Grisel Machado; Cuba	13.18	Marisela Peralta; Dominican Republic	14.07	June Caddle; Barbados	14.08
1986	Odalys Adams; Cuba	13.50	Grisel Machado; Cuba	13.56	Sandra Taváres; Mexico	13.86
1990	Aliuska López; Cuba	12.94A	Odalys Adams; Cuba	13.26A	Sandra Taváres; Mexico	13.68A
1993	Aliuska López; Cuba	13.46	Oraidis Ramírez; Cuba	13.49	Joyce Meléndez; Puerto Rico	14.22
1998	Dionne Rose; Jamaica	12.64	Gillian Russell; Jamaica	12.66	Dainelky Pérez; Cuba	13.23
2002	Dionne Rose-Henley; Jamaica	13.67	Princesa Oliveros; Colombia	13.72	Nadine Faustin; Haiti	13.84
2006	Anay Tejeda; Cuba	12.86	Nadine Faustin; Haiti	12.91	Toni-Ann D'Oyley; Jamaica	13.10
2010	Aleesha Barber; Trinidad and Tobago	13.09	Eliecith Palacios; Colombia	13.20	Andrea Bliss; Jamaica	13.20
2014	Lina Marcela Flórez; Colombia	13.19	Brigitte Merlano; Colombia	13.19	Kierre Beckles; Barbados	13.47
2018	Andrea Vargas; Costa Rica	12.90 NR	Vanessa Clerveaux; Haiti	13.07	Jeanine Williams; Jamaica	13.11

=== 400 metres hurdles ===
Games	Gold		Silver		Bronze	
1982	Sandra Farmer; Jamaica	58.15	Mercedes Mesa; Cuba	58.65	Stephanie Vega; Puerto Rico	59.11
1986	Flora Hyacinth; U.S. Virgin Islands	57.55	Tania Fernández; Cuba	57.6	Alma Vázquez; Mexico	59.05
1990	Elsa Jiménez; Cuba	57.59A	Maribelsy Peña; Colombia	59.06A	Tania Fernández; Cuba	59.55A
1993	Lency Montelier; Cuba	57.61	Maribelsy Peña; Colombia	58.68	Wynsome Cole; Jamaica	60.23
1998	Deon Hemmings; Jamaica	54.30	Andrea Blackett; Barbados	54.61	Debbie-Ann Parris; Jamaica	55.15
2002	Yvonne Harrison; Puerto Rico	57.39	Yamelis Ortiz; Puerto Rico	57.52	Princesa Oliveros; Colombia	57.72
2006	Daimí Pernía; Cuba	55.32	Josanne Lucas; Trinidad and Tobago	55.60	Melaine Walker; Jamaica	55.97
2010	Nickiesha Wilson; Jamaica	55.40	Zudikey Rodríguez; Mexico	55.54 PB	Janeil Bellille; Trinidad and Tobago	56.81 PB
2014	Zudikey Rodríguez; Mexico	56.79	Magdalena Mendoza; Venezuela	57.67	Zurian Hechavarría; Cuba	57.74
2018	Ronda Whyte; Jamaica	55.08	Zudikey Rodríguez; Mexico	55.11 NR	Zurian Hechavarría; Cuba	55.13 PB

=== 4 × 100 metres relay ===
Games	Gold		Silver		Bronze	
1938	Panama; Natalia Taivez; Nola Thorne; Adela Montilla; Nilda Villaverde	51.3	Cuba; Marta Velasco; Carmen Ortega; Zenaida Castro; Olga Agüero		Jamaica; Gertrude Messam; Rhona Saunders; Beryl Delgado; Icis Clarke	
1946	Panama; Dolores Worrell; Mildred Bannister; Esther Stewart; Emilia Foster	49.1	Jamaica; Cynthia Thompson; Cynthia Llewellyn; Hyacinth Walters; Icis Clarke	50.1	Cuba; Regla Cáceres; Georgina Iglesias; Esperanza McKenzie; Bertha Delgado	53.0
1950	Jamaica; Kathleen Russell; Karleen Searchwell; Hyacinth Walters; Cynthia Thompson	48.9A	Guatemala; Elia Bolaños; María C. Resinos; Judith Andrade; Graviola Ewing	52.0A	Mexico; Esther Villalón; Elia Galván; Concepción Sánchez; Teresa Bobadilla	52.2A
1954	Panama; Dolores Worrell; María Bell; Gloria Taite; Carlota Gooden	47.49A (47.3)	Jamaica; Kathleen Russell; Kathleen Robotham; Cynthia Thompson; Hyacinth Walters	48.34A (48.2)	Cuba; Nereida Borges; Vilma Santos; Belkis Rodríguez; Bertha Díaz	48.81A (48.7)
1959	Panama; Marcela Daniel; Lorraine Dunn; Silvia Hunte; Jean Holmes	50.51 (50.5)	Mexico; Guillermina Peña; Raquel Trujillo; Ma. Teresa Treviño; Yolanda Vincourt	51.81 (51.7)	Venezuela; Benilde Ascanio; Alvia Ford; Biserka de Vamich; Morella Ettedgui	53.26 (53.2)
1962	Jamaica; Dorothy Yates; Carmen Williams; Carmen Smith; Ouida Walker	47.0	Cuba; Bertha Díaz; Nereida Borges; Miguelina Cobián; Fulgencia Romay	47.3	Panama; Lorraine Dunn; Marcela Daniel; Delceita Oakley; Dinor Batista	47.7
1966	Jamaica; Adlin Mair; Una Morris; Vilma Charlton; Carmen Smith	46.2	Cuba; Irene Martínez; Cristina Hechavarria; Fulgencia Romay; Miguelina Cobián	46.5	Barbados; Aledene Holder; Freida Nicholls; Arlene Babb; Patsy Callender	49.5
1970	Cuba; Marlene Elejarde; Cristina Hechavarria; Fulgencia Romay; Miguelina Cobián	44.7	Panama; Margarita Martínez; Patricia Morgan; Dolores Cox; Nivia Trejos	47.3	Mexico; Mercedes Román; Enriqueta Basilio; Lucía Quiroz; Silvia Tapia	48.1
1974	Cuba; Marlene Elejarde; Carmen Valdés; Asunción Acosta; Silvia Chivás	44.90	Panama; Diva Bishop; Margarita Martínez; Maritza Escalona; Beatriz Aparicio	47.42	Mexico; Mercedes Román; María Ángeles Cato; Mireya Vázquez; Corina Garduño	48.02
1978	Cuba; Grisel Machado; Silvia Chivás; Carmen Valdés; Isabel Taylor	44.37	Jamaica; Leleith Hodges; Dorothy Scott; Jacqueline Pusey; Maureen Gottschalk	44.41	Trinidad and Tobago; Esther Hope; Janice Bernard; Joane Gardnert; Rebeca	45.13
1982	Trinidad and Tobago; Gillian Forde; Maxime McMillan; Angela Williams; Janice Bernard	44.86	Jamaica; Veronica Findlay; Cathy Rattray; Anthea Johnson; Jacqueline Pusey	45.77	Cuba; Luisa Ferrer; Idania Pino; Ester Petitón; Grisel Machado	45.85
1986	Cuba; Idania Pino; Luisa Ferrer; Susana Armenteros; María Zamora	44.55	Bahamas; Carmel Major; Pauline Davis; Deborah Greene; Shonel Ferguson	45.49	Mexico; Guadalupe García; Alma Vázquez; Alejandra Flores; Sandra Taváres	45.58
1990	Cuba; Odalys Adams; Aliuska López; Julia Duporty; Liliana Allen	44.54A	Colombia; Alejandra Quiñones; Norfalia Carabalí; Ximena Restrepo; Maribelcy Peña	45.29A	Mexico; Sandra Taváres; Alma Vázquez; Guadalupe García; Gabriela Romero	45.75A
1993	Cuba; Miriam Ferrer; Aliuska López; Julia Duporty; Liliana Allen	44.59	Colombia; Elia Mera; Ximena Restrepo; Patricia Rodríguez; Norfalia Carabalí	44.62	Jamaica; Cheryl Phillips; Kerry Richards; Shelly Beth; Nikole Mitchell	45.75
1998	Cuba; Idalia Hechavarría; Dainelky Pérez; Mercedes Carnesolta; Virgen Benavides	43.89	Colombia; Norfalia Carabalí; Felipa Palacios; Patricia Rodríguez; Mirtha Brock	44.39	Jamaica; Tulia Robinson; Tayna Lawrence; Donette Brown; Brigitte Foster	44.89
2002	Colombia; Digna Murillo; Melisa Murillo; Mirtha Brock; Princesa Oliveros	45.34	El Salvador; Marcela Navarro; Karla Hernández; Verónica Quijano; Aura Amaya	46.95	Jamaica; Melocia Clarke; Dionne Rose-Henley; Jenice Daley; Winsome Howell	50.62
2006	Cuba; Virgen Benavides; Misleidys Lazo; Roxana Díaz; Anay Tejeda	43.29	Colombia; Yomara Hinestroza; Felipa Palacios; Darlenys Obregón; Norma González	44.32	Bahamas; Savatheda Fynes; Shandra Brown; Tamicka Clarke; T-Shonda Webb	44.34
2010	Puerto Rico; Beatriz Cruz; Celiangeli Morales; Erika Rivera; Carol Rodríguez	43.46	Colombia; Eliecith Palacios; Maria Idrobo; Darlenys Obregón; Yomara Hinestroza	43.63	Jamaica; Audria Segree; Jovanee Jarrett; Andrea Bliss; Anastasia Le-Roy	44.27
2014	Venezuela; Nediam Vargas; Andrea Purica; Nelsibeth Villalobos; Nercely Soto	43.53	Colombia; Lina Marcela Flórez; María Alejandra Idrobo; Darlenys Obregón; Eliecith Palacios	44.02	Cuba; Geylis Montes; Arialis Gandulla; Greter Guillén; Dulaimi Debora Odelin	44.19
2018	Jamaica; Jura Levy; Sherone Simpson; Jonielle Smith; Natasha Morrison	43.41	Trinidad and Tobago; Khalifa St. Fort; Zakiyah Denoon; Reyare Thomas; Semoy Hackett	43.61	Dominican Republic; Mariely Sánchez; Marileidy Paulino; Anabel Medina; Estrella de Aza	43.68 SB

=== 4 × 400 metres relay ===
Games	Gold		Silver		Bronze	
1978	Cuba; Ana Guibert; Ana Fidelia Quirot; Beatriz Castillo; Aurelia Pentón	3:31.34	Jamaica; Ruth Williams-Simpson; Norma Leea; Maureen Gottschalk; Helen Blake	3:41.69	Puerto Rico; Angelita Lind; Ileana Hocking; Madeline de Jesús; Vilma Paris	3:46.58
1982	Cuba; Mercedes Álvarez; Ana Fidelia Quirot; Mercedes Mesa; Nery McKeen	3:35.22	Puerto Rico; Nilsa Paris; Stephanie Vega; Margaret de Jesús; Marie Lande Mathieu	3:36.52	Jamaica; Jacqueline Pusey; Cathy Rattray; Sandra Farmer; Anthea Johnson	3:37.86
1986	Cuba; Ester Petitón; Odalys Hernández; Nery McKeen; Ana Fidelia Quirot	3:33.60	Puerto Rico; Virgen Fontánez; Roxanne Oliver; Mercedes Ríos; Angelita Lind	3:41.32	Dominican Republic; María Acevedo; Ana Peña; Virginia Cruz; Glennis Reynoso	3:47.84
1990	Cuba; Nancy McLeón; Elsa Jiménez; Julia Duporty; Ana Fidelia Quirot	3:26.27A	Mexico; Erendira Villagómez; Alejandra Quintanar; Rosa García; Areli Ovalle	3:44.59A	Puerto Rico; Arealis Acosta; Daisy Ocasio; Sonia Escalera; Walesica Ramos	3:50.08A
1993	Cuba; Idalmis Bonne; Julia Duporty; Lency Montelier; Nancy McLeón	3:31.27	Jamaica; Wynsome Cole; Shelly Berth; Tanya Jarret; Claudine Williams	3:37.72	Puerto Rico	3:39.51
1998	Cuba; Yudalis Díaz; Lency Montelier; Idalmis Bonne; Julia Duporty	3:29.65	Jamaica; Charmaine Howel; Keisha Downer; Debbie-Ann Parris; Tracey Barnes	3:30.03	Barbados; Joanne Durant; Andrea Blackett; Sherline Williams; Melissa Straker	3:31.91
2002	Mexico; America Rangel; Magaly Yánez; Gabriela Medina; Ana Guevara	3:31.24	Puerto Rico; Beatriz Cruz; Sandra Moya; Yamelis Ortiz; Militza Castro	3:35.94	Venezuela; Yusmelis García; Ángela Alfonso; Yenny Mejías; Eliana Pacheco	3:37.86
2006	Mexico; Ruth Grajeda; Ana Guevara; Gabriela Medina; Mayra González	3:29.92	Jamaica; Clora Williams; Shevon Stoddart; Melaine Walker; Althea Chambers	3:32.86	Cuba; Ana Peña; Daimí Pernía; Yenima Arencibia; Zulia Calatayud	3:36.34
2010	Jamaica; Davita Prendergast; Nikita Tracey; Dominique Blake; Clora Williams	3:32.31	Colombia; Jennifer Padilla; Maria Idrobo; Darlenys Obregón; Norma González	3:33.03 NR	Mexico; Carla Dueñas; Nallely Vela; Gabriela Medina; Zudikey Rodríguez	3:33.33
2014	Cuba; Lisneidys Inés Veitía; Gilda Casanova; Yameisi Borlot; Daisiuramis Bonne	3:29.69	Mexico; Natali Brito; Gabriela Medina; Mariel Espinosa; Zudikey Rodríguez	3:33.16	Colombia; Norma González; Zulley Melissa Torres; Jennifer Padilla; Evelis Aguilar	3:34.14
2018	Cuba; Zurian Hechavarría; Rose Mary Almanza; Gilda Casanova; Roxana Gómez	3:29.48 GR	Jamaica; Derri-Ann Hill; Tiffany James; Sonikqua Walker; Junelle Bromfield	3:30.67	Colombia; Eliana Chávez; Rosangélica Escobar; Melissa Gonzalez; Jennifer Padilla	3:32.61

=== High jump ===
Games	Gold		Silver		Bronze	
1938	Lilia Wilson; Panama	1.41	Beryl Delgado; Jamaica	1.39	Isabel Sullivan; Panama	1.32
1946	Carmen Phipps; Jamaica	1.54	Vinton Beckett; Jamaica	1.52	Silvia Ford; Panama	1.44
1950	Vinton Beckett; Jamaica	1.61A	Carmen Phipps; Jamaica	1.59A	Lili Schluter; Mexico	1.30A
1954	Kathleen Russell; Jamaica	1.50A	Kathleen Robotham; Jamaica	1.47A	Sheila Leyva; Venezuela	1.42A
1959	Benilda Ascanio; Venezuela	1.43	Margarita Kabsch; Mexico	1.40	Silvia Hunte; Panama	1.40
1962	Brenda Archer; British Guiana	1.53	Marta Font; Cuba	1.51	Beverley Welsh; Jamaica	1.51
1966	Patsy Callender; Barbados	1.65	Hilda Fabré; Cuba	1.60	Julia Pérez; Cuba	1.55
1970	Hilda Fabré; Cuba	1.73	Lucía Duquet; Cuba	1.68	Marima Rodríguez; Cuba	1.64
1974	Lucía Duquet; Cuba	1.74	Elisa Ávila; Mexico	1.74	Maritza García; Cuba	1.71
1978	Angela Carbonell; Cuba	1.75	Grace Jackson; Jamaica	1.70	Elisa Ávila; Mexico	1.65
1982	Silvia Costa; Cuba	1.90	Angela Carbonell; Cuba	1.81	Iraima Parra; Venezuela	1.78
1986	Silvia Costa; Cuba	1.96	Cristina Fink; Mexico	1.81	Laura Agront; Puerto Rico	1.79
1990	María del Carmen García; Cuba	1.87A	Silvia Costa; Cuba	1.82A	Cristina Fink; Mexico	1.79A
1998	Juana Arrendel; Dominican Republic	1.90	Natasha Gibson; Trinidad and Tobago	1.82	Niurka Lussón; Cuba	1.79
2002	Juana Arrendel; Dominican Republic	1.97	Romary Rifka; Mexico	1.85	Caterine Ibargüen; Colombia	1.79
2006	Juana Arrendel; Dominican Republic	1.93	Caterine Ibargüen; Colombia	1.88	Levern Spencer; Saint Lucia	1.88
2010	Levern Spencer; Saint Lucia	1.94 m	Sheree Francis; Jamaica	1.91 m	Romary Rifka; Mexico	1.91 m
2014	Levern Spencer; Saint Lucia	1.89 m	Priscilla Frederick; Antigua and Barbuda	1.83 m	Kashani Ríos; Panama	1.80 m
2018	Levern Spencer; Saint Lucia	1.90 m	Ximena Esquivel; Mexico	1.86 m	María Fernanda Murillo; Colombia	1.86 m

=== Pole vault ===
Games	Gold		Silver		Bronze	
1998	Alejandra Meza; Mexico	3.70	Mariana McCarthy; Cuba	3.50	Agueda Jerez; Guatemala	2.90
2002	Milena Agudelo; Colombia	3.90	Alejandra Meza; Mexico	3.80	Andrea Zambrana; Puerto Rico	3.80
2006	Maryoris Sánchez; Cuba	4.10 GR	Yarisley Silva; Cuba	3.95	Keisa Monterola; Venezuela	3.85
2010	Keisa Monterola; Venezuela	4.20 m GR	Andrea Zambrana; Puerto Rico	3.90 m	Milena Agudelo; Colombia	3.90 m
2014	Yarisley Silva; Cuba	4.60 m GR	Diamara Planell; Puerto Rico	4.15 m	Robeilys Peinado; Venezuela	4.15 m
2018	Yarisley Silva; Cuba	4.70 m GR	Robeilys Peinado; Venezuela	4.50 m	Lisa Salomón; Cuba	4.10 m =PB

=== Long jump ===
Games	Gold		Silver		Bronze	
1962	Bertha Díaz; Cuba	5.50	Dorothy Yates; Jamaica	5.38	Gisela Vidal; Venezuela	5.35
1966	Irene Martínez; Cuba	5.87	Beverley Welsh; Jamaica	5.72	Marcia Garbey; Cuba	5.47
1970	Marcia Garbey; Cuba	6.60	Marina Samuells; Cuba	6.31w	Miriam Pupo; Cuba	6.00w
1974	Marcia Garbey; Cuba	6.48	Ana Alexander; Cuba	6.07	Dora Thompson; Cuba	5.75
1978	Shonel Ferguson; Bahamas	6.41	Ana Alexander; Cuba	6.25	Eloína Echevarría; Cuba	6.12
1982	Eloína Echevarría; Cuba	6.53	Shonel Ferguson; Bahamas	6.47	Madeline de Jesús; Puerto Rico	6.47
1986	Eloína Echevarría; Cuba	6.61	Shonel Ferguson; Bahamas	6.43	Flora Hyacinth; U.S. Virgin Islands	6.36
1990	Niurka Montalvo; Cuba	6.58A	Eloína Echevarría; Cuba	6.40Aw	Euphemia Huggins; Trinidad and Tobago	6.39A
1993	Niurka Montalvo; Cuba	6.37	Eloína Echevarría; Cuba	5.91w	Suzette Lee; Jamaica	5.53
1998	Flora Hyacinth; U.S. Virgin Islands	6.57	Jackie Edwards; Bahamas	6.50	Lacena Golding; Jamaica	6.49
2002	María Espencer; Dominican Republic	6.20	Yuridia Bustamante; Mexico	6.11	Yesenia Rivera; Puerto Rico	6.03
2006	Yudelkis Fernández; Cuba	6.37	Caterine Ibargüen; Colombia	6.36	Tanika Liburd; Saint Kitts and Nevis	6.23
2010	Rhonda Watkins; Trinidad and Tobago	6.67 m GR	Jovanee Jarrett; Jamaica	6.52 m	Bianca Stuart; Bahamas	6.50 m
2014	Chantel Malone; British Virgin Islands	6.46 m (w: -0.3 m/s)	Irisdaymi Herrera; Cuba	6.36 m (w: +0.9 m/s)	Zoila Flores; Mexico	6.26 m (w: +1.0 m/s)
2018	Caterine Ibargüen; Colombia	6.83 m w	Chantel Malone; British Virgin Islands	6.52 m SB	Alysbeth Félix; Puerto Rico	6.45 m w

=== Triple jump ===
Games	Gold		Silver		Bronze	
1993	Niurka Montalvo; Cuba	13.57	Eloína Echevarría; Cuba	13.02	Suzette Lee; Jamaica	12.40
1998	Yamilé Aldama; Cuba	14.34	Suzette Lee; Jamaica	13.77	Olga Cepero; Cuba	13.74
2002	María Espencer; Dominican Republic	13.57	Caterine Ibargüen; Colombia	13.17	Jennifer Arveláez; Venezuela	13.10
2006	Mabel Gay; Cuba	14.20	Yudelkis Fernández; Cuba	13.87	Johana Triviño; Colombia	13.71
2010	Kimberly Williams; Jamaica	14.23 m PB	Caterine Ibargüen; Colombia	14.10 m	Ayanna Alexander; Trinidad and Tobago	13.64 m
2014	Caterine Ibargüen; Colombia	14.57 m (w: -0.4 m/s) GR	Dailenys Alcántara; Cuba	14.09 m (w: -0.3 m/s)	Yosiris Urrutia; Colombia	13.89 m (w: +0.3 m/s)
2018	Caterine Ibargüen; Colombia	14.92 m GR	Yosiris Urrutia; Colombia	14.48 m w	Liadagmis Povea; Cuba	14.44 m w

=== Shot put ===
Games	Gold		Silver		Bronze	
1966	Hilda Ramírez; Cuba	12.72	Guadalupe Lartigue; Mexico	12.23	Francisca Roberts; Venezuela	12.02
1970	Grecia Hamilton; Cuba	14.56	Hilda Ramírez; Cuba	13.85	Carmen Romero; Cuba	13.63
1974	María Elena Sarría; Cuba	14.60	Hilda Ramírez; Cuba	14.40	Caridad Romero; Cuba	13.82
1978	Hilda Ramírez; Cuba	17.00	Marcelina Rodríguez; Cuba	14.97	Vicky López; Puerto Rico	13.42
1982	María Elena Sarría; Cuba	19.36	Rosa Fernández; Cuba	17.54	Luz Bohórquez; Venezuela	13.63
1986	Marcelina Rodríguez; Cuba	17.22	Rosa Fernández; Cuba	17.17	María Isabel Urrutia; Colombia	14.48
1990	Belsy Laza; Cuba	17.73A	Herminia Fernández; Cuba	16.36A	María Isabel Urrutia; Colombia	16.09A
1993	Herminia Fernández; Cuba	18.00	Yumileidi Cumbá; Cuba	17.67	Laverne Eve; Bahamas	15.35
1998	Yumileidi Cumbá; Cuba	17.31	Herminia Fernández; Cuba	17.31	María Isabel Urrutia; Colombia	14.25
2002	Fior Vásquez; Dominican Republic	17.04	Luz Dary Castro; Colombia	15.98	Isabella Charles; Dominica	12.84
2006	Yumileidi Cumbá; Cuba	19.31	Misleydis González; Cuba	18.80	Cleopatra Borel; Trinidad and Tobago	18.33
2010	Cleopatra Borel; Trinidad and Tobago	18.76 m	Zara Northover; Jamaica	17.04 m PB	Annie Alexander; Trinidad and Tobago	16.76 m
2014	Cleopatra Borel; Trinidad and Tobago	18.99 m	Yaniuvis López; Cuba	17.88 m	Sandra Lemos; Colombia	17.50 m
2018	Cleopatra Borel; Trinidad and Tobago	18.14 m	Yaniuvis López; Cuba	18.03 m	María Fernanda Orozco; Mexico	17.88 NR

=== Discus throw ===
Games	Gold		Silver		Bronze	
1938	Rebecca Coldberg; Puerto Rico	27.81	Esperanza Morales; Mexico	24.89	Irma Cornejo; El Salvador	23.89
1946	Judith Caballero; Panama	30.17	Esther Reyes; Mexico	29.73	Gloria Álvarez; Cuba	29.72
1950	Concepción Villanueva; Mexico	33.96A	Alejandrina Herrera; Cuba	31.78A	Ana Campos; El Salvador	30.91A
1954	Alejandrina Herrera; Cuba	37.18A	Lili Schluter; Mexico	36.04A	Concepción Villanueva; Mexico	35.51A
1959	Lili Schluter; Mexico	40.79	Ivonne Rojano; Mexico	37.19	Nerva Matheus; Venezuela	31.04
1962	Caridad Agüero; Cuba	43.75	Alejandrina Herrera; Cuba	38.70	Ivonne Rojano; Mexico	38.69
1966	Caridad Agüero; Cuba	43.37	Joan Gordon; Jamaica	39.84	Carmen Romero; Cuba	39.07
1970	Carmen Romero; Cuba	53.54	María Cristina Betancourt; Cuba	46.08	Hilda Ramírez; Cuba	44.10
1974	Carmen Romero; Cuba	54.70	María Cristina Betancourt; Cuba	52.20	Salvadora Vargas; Cuba	41.92
1978	Carmen Romero; Cuba	60.54	María Cristina Betancourt; Cuba	57.58	Selene Saldarriaga; Colombia	41.28
1982	María Cristina Betancourt; Cuba	63.76	Carmen Romero; Cuba	61.98	Yunaira Piña; Venezuela	46.86
1986	Hilda Ramos; Cuba	63.44	Maritza Martén; Cuba	63.24	María Isabel Urrutia; Colombia	50.68
1990	Bárbara Hechavarría; Cuba	58.62A	Olga Gómez; Cuba	56.06A	María Isabel Urrutia; Colombia	53.84A
1993	Bárbara Hechavarría; Cuba	61.02	Maritza Martén; Cuba	59.44	María Isabel Urrutia; Colombia	53.12
1998	Bárbara Hechavarría; Cuba	58.14	Hilda Ramos; Cuba	55.42	María Isabel Urrutia; Colombia	50.44
2002	Luz Dary Castro; Colombia	55.11	Flor Acosta; Mexico	48.12	Ana Lucía Espinoza; Guatemala	46.61
2006	Yania Ferrales; Cuba	59.70	Yarelys Barrios; Cuba	58.22	Keisha Walkes; Barbados	48.10
2010	María Cubillán; Venezuela	52.21 m	Annie Alexander; Trinidad and Tobago	51.03 m	Paulina Flores; Mexico	49.57 m
2014	Denia Caballero; Cuba	64.47 m GR	Yaime Pérez; Cuba	62.42 m	Johana Martínez; Colombia	56.27 m
2018	Yaime Pérez; Cuba	66.00 m GR	Denia Caballero; Cuba	65.10 m	Shaniece Love; Jamaica	58.40 m PB

=== Hammer throw ===
Games	Gold		Silver		Bronze	
1998	Aldenay Vasallo; Cuba	61.46	María Eugenia Villamizar; Colombia	57.69	Norbi Balantén; Cuba	57.30
2002	Amarilys Alméstica; Puerto Rico	60.39	Violeta Guzmán; Mexico	58.48	Nancy Guillén; El Salvador	57.10
2006	Yipsi Moreno; Cuba	70.22 GR	Yunaika Crawford; Cuba	67.88	Johana Moreno; Colombia	65.51 NR
2010	Johana Moreno; Colombia	66.98 m	Rosa Rodríguez; Venezuela	64.16 m	Natalie Grant; Jamaica	59.93 m
2014	Yipsi Moreno; Cuba	71.35 m GR	Yirisleydi Ford; Cuba	69.62 m	Johana Moreno; Colombia	67.77 m
2018	Rosa Rodríguez; Venezuela	67.91 m	Elianis Despaigne; Cuba	64.40 m	Yaritza Martínez; Cuba	61.44 m

=== Javelin throw ===
Games	Gold		Silver		Bronze	
1938	Rebecca Coldberg; Puerto Rico	30.25	Marina Soto; Mexico	29.30	Florinda Viamontes; Cuba	28.16
1946	Judith Caballero; Panama	38.04	Ángela Iglesias; Cuba	36.75	Alicia Reyes; Puerto Rico	33.99
1950	Judith Caballero; Panama	36.20A	Berta Chiú; Mexico	34.33A	Ana Campos; El Salvador	33.40A
1954	Ana Campos; Panama	38.82A	Berta Chiú; Mexico	38.43A	Amalia Yubi; Mexico	37.45A
1959	Berta Chiú; Mexico	35.21	Raquel Trujillo; Mexico	35.14	Mercedes García; Venezuela	34.75
1962	Hilda Ramírez; Cuba	40.32	Beverly Eloisa Oglivie; Panama	40.19	Berta Chiú; Mexico	35.63
1966	Hilda Ramírez; Cuba	39.34	Blanca Umaña; Colombia	37.39	María Moreno; Cuba	36.47
1970	Tomasa Núñez; Cuba	45.64	Hilda Ramírez; Cuba	45.46	Blanca Umaña; Colombia	43.54
1974	Tomasa Núñez; Cuba	47.58	María Beltrán; Cuba	47.46	Gladys González; Venezuela	46.58
1978	María Caridad Colón; Cuba	63.40	María Beltrán; Cuba	54.86	Guadalupe López; Mexico	49.80
1982	María Caridad Colón; Cuba	62.80	Mayra Vila; Cuba	60.22	Marieta Riera; Venezuela	51.50
1986	María Caridad Colón; Cuba	67.00	Ivonne Leal; Cuba	56.56	María González; Puerto Rico	54.38
1990	Herminia Bouza; Cuba	57.74A	María Caridad Colón; Cuba	55.86A	Marieta Riera; Venezuela	51.86A
1993	Isel López; Cuba	61.48	Xiomara Rivero; Cuba	57.02	Patricia Alonso; Venezuela	50.38
1998	Sonia Bisset; Cuba	66.67	Osleidys Menéndez; Cuba	62.06	Laverne Eve; Bahamas	60.66
2002	Zuleima Araméndiz; Colombia	56.63	Sabina Moya; Colombia	55.73	Nereida Ríos; Mexico	46.51
2006	Sonia Bisset; Cuba	63.30 NR	Osleidys Menéndez; Cuba	59.94	Laverne Eve; Bahamas	57.29
2010	Kateema Riettie; Jamaica	53.77 m	Fresa Nuñez; Dominican Republic	52.96 m	María Lucelly Murillo; Colombia	51.29 m
2014	Flor Ruiz; Colombia	63.80 m GR	Abigail Gómez; Mexico	57.28	Coralys Ortiz; Puerto Rico	54.53
2018	María Lucelly Murillo; Colombia	59.54 m	Coraly Ortiz; Puerto Rico	56.27 m	Yulenmis Aguilar; Cuba	55.60 m

=== Pentathlon ===
Games	Gold		Silver		Bronze	
1970	Marlene Elejarde; Cuba	4534	Marcia Garbey; Cuba	4428	Mercedes Román; Mexico	4243
1974	Francisca Janssen; Netherlands Antilles	4014	Angela Carbonell; Cuba	3867	Mercedes Román; Mexico	3827
1978	Elida Aveillé; Cuba	3636	Alix Castillo; Venezuela	3625	Laura Vázquez; Mexico	3511

=== Heptathlon ===
Games	Gold		Silver		Bronze	
1982	Elida Aveillé; Cuba	5579	Victoria Despaigne; Cuba	5210	Leyda Castro; Dominican Republic	5123
1986	Caridad Balcindes; Cuba	5313	Leyda Castro; Dominican Republic	5025	Irina Ambulo; Panama	4997 (NR)
1990	Zorobabelia Córdoba; Colombia	5647A	Magalys García; Cuba	5528A	Laiza Carrillo; Cuba	5519A
1993	Magalys García; Cuba	5903	Regla Cárdenas; Cuba	5838	Zorobabelia Córdoba; Colombia	5326
1998	Magalys García; Cuba	5888	Marsha Mark; Trinidad and Tobago	5706	Lisa Wright; Jamaica	5566
2002	Francia Manzanillo; Dominican Republic	5279	Judith Méndez; Dominican Republic	5261	Nyota Peters; Guyana	4657
2006	Yuleidis Limonta; Cuba	5952 GR	Juana Castillo; Dominican Republic	5664	Gretchen Quintana; Cuba	5584
2010	Peaches Roach; Jamaica	5780 pts PB	Francia Manzanillo; Dominican Republic	5561 pts	Tammilee Kerr; Jamaica	5345 pts
2014	Yorgelis Rodríguez; Cuba	5984 pts GR	Yusleidys Mendieta; Cuba	5819 pts	Alysbeth Félix; Puerto Rico	5721 pts
2018	Yorgelis Rodríguez; Cuba	6436 pts GR	Evelis Aguilar; Colombia	6285 pts AR	Luisaris Toledo; Venezuela	5848 pts NR

=== Marathon ===
Games	Gold		Silver		Bronze	
1986	Naidi Nazario; Puerto Rico	2:55:44	Maribel Durruty; Cuba	3:08:57	Aida Torres; Puerto Rico	3:10:19
1990	Floría Moreno; Mexico	2:47:38A	Marisol Vargas; Mexico	2:50:25A	Maribel Durruty; Cuba	2:50:41A
1993	Emma Cabrera; Mexico	2:42:29	María Elena Reyna; Mexico	2:43:39	Emperatriz Wilson; Cuba	2:54:41
1998	Emma Cabrera; Mexico	2:57:49	Marisol Vargas; Mexico	2:58:34	Kriscia García; El Salvador	3:00:21
2002	Isabel Orellana; Mexico	2:54:14	Paola Cabrera; Mexico	2:56:05	Lourdes Cruz; Puerto Rico	2:59:46
2006	María Elena Valencia; Mexico	2:45:49	Yailén García; Cuba	2:51:43	Iglandini González; Colombia	2:54:05
2010	Marisol Romero; Mexico	2:44:30	Gabriela Traña; Costa Rica	2:46:22	Paula Apolonio; Mexico	2:48:46
2014	Margarita Hernández; Mexico	2:41:16 GR	Dailín Belmonte; Cuba	2:42:01	Zuleima Amaya; Venezuela	2:42:27
2018	Madaí Pérez; Mexico	2:57:55	Dailín Belmonte; Cuba	2:59:09	Angie Orjuela; Colombia	2:59:49

=== 10km walk ===
Games	Gold		Silver		Bronze	
1986	María Colín; Mexico	50:43.62	Graciela Mendoza; Mexico	51:56.62	Margarita Morales; Cuba	55:00.93
1990	Graciela Mendoza; Mexico	49:09.45A	Maricela Chávez; Mexico	50:49.55A	Liliana Bermeo; Colombia	51:33.27A
1993	María Colín; Mexico	47:57.20	Liliana Bermeo; Colombia	49:21.18	Magdalena Guzmán; El Salvador	53:16.81
1998	Graciela Mendoza; Mexico	46:30.16	Rosario Sánchez; Mexico	47:12.74	Oslaidis Cruz; Cuba	47:14.85

=== 20km walk ===
Games	Gold		Silver		Bronze	
2002	Victoria Palacios; Mexico	1:36:16	Rosario Sánchez; Mexico	1:36:44	Teresita Collado; Guatemala	1:42:07
2006	Cristina López; El Salvador	1:38:26	Evelyn Núñez; Guatemala	1:39:37	Sandra Zapata; Colombia	1:41.37
2010	Sandra Galvis; Colombia	1:38:27 PB	Milangela Rosales; Venezuela	1:40:16 PB	Rosario Sánchez; Mexico	1:41:56 PB
2014	Mirna Ortiz; Guatemala	1:35:43 GR	Sandra Arenas; Colombia	1:36:29	Ingrid Hernández; Colombia	1:37:11
