= Athletics at the 1935 Central American and Caribbean Games =

The athletics competition at the 1935 Central American and Caribbean Games was held in San Salvador, El Salvador.

== Medal summary ==
=== Men's events ===
Event	Gold		Silver		Bronze	
100 metres	Conrado Rodríguez; Cuba	10.7	José Costa; Cuba		Reginald Bedford; Panama	
200 metres	Conrado Rodríguez; Cuba	22.0	Norberto Verrier; Cuba		Luciano Flores; Cuba	
400 metres	Carlos de Anda Dominguez; Mexico	49.3	Horacio Gómez; Cuba		Antonio Quesada; Mexico	
800 metres	Alfredo Mariscal; Mexico	2:00.9	Luis Vázquez; Cuba		Miguel Vasconcelos; Mexico	
1500 metres	Delfino Campos; Mexico	4:11.9	Reinaldo Bernal; Mexico		Pedro Sarría; Cuba	
5000 metres	Mariano Ramírez; Mexico	16:16.7	Juan Morales; Mexico		Herculano Ruiz; Guatemala	
10,000 metres	Juan Morales; Mexico	33:16.0	Estanislao Galicia; Mexico		Braulio Flores; Mexico	
110 metres hurdles	Roberto Sánchez; Mexico	15.8	Juan José Zulueta; Cuba		Raúl Torres; Puerto Rico	
400 metres hurdles	Lázaro Hernández; Cuba	55.5	Gilberto González; Puerto Rico		Ernesto Alayeto; Cuba	
4 × 100 m relay	Cuba; Conrado Rodríguez; José Acosta; Alberto Torriente; Norberto Verrier	43.2	Puerto Rico; Eulalio Villodas; Eugenio Guerra; Frank Cepero; Gilberto González		Mexico; Manuel Ortiz; Alejo C. Pérez; Jesús Moraila; Fernando Ramírez	
4 × 400 m relay	Cuba; Lius Vázquez; Lázaro Hernández; Vicente Fernández; Horacio Gómez	3:22.4	Mexico; Carlos de Anda; Antonio Quezada; José M. Alvarez; Julio Rodríguez		Puerto Rico; Gilberto González; Raúl Torres; José Martínez; Eulalio Villodas	
High jump	Juan Luyanda; Puerto Rico	1.77	José Martínez; Puerto Rico	1.73	Rafael Pérez; Cuba	1.71
Pole vault	José Sabater; Puerto Rico	3.73	Gustavo Pontvianne; Mexico	3.68	Rigoberto Pérez; Mexico	3.55
Long jump	Norberto Verrier; Cuba	6.68	Pascual Gutiérrez; Mexico	6.57	Raúl Juliá; Puerto Rico	6.49
Triple jump	Orlando Bello; Cuba	13.71	Armando Fernández; Cuba	13.70	Salvador Alanís; Mexico	13.50
Shot put	Fernando Torres; Puerto Rico	12.84	Ignacio Vázquez; Cuba	12.18	Raúl Urquijo; Mexico	11.99
Discus throw	Miguel Gutiérrez; Cuba	38.83	Heriberto Alonso; Cuba	38.38	Francisco Robledo; Mexico	38.04
Hammer throw	Francisco Robledo; Mexico	43.52	Juan Prera; Guatemala	39.08	Bernabé Sánchez; Cuba	38.38
Javelin throw	Antonio Figueroa; Puerto Rico	59.32	Alfredo Piedra; Cuba	50.45	Mario Salas; Cuba	50.31
Pentathlon	Felipe Orellana; Guatemala	3231	Gilberto González; Puerto Rico	3179	Manuel Suárez; Cuba	2852

== Medal table ==
Rank	Nation	Gold	Silver	Bronze	Total
1	Cuba (CUB)	8	9	7	24
2	Mexico (MEX)	7	6	8	21
3	Puerto Rico (PUR)	4	4	3	11
4	Guatemala (GUA)	1	1	1	3
5	Panama (PAN)	0	0	1	1
Totals (5 entries)		20	20	20	60
