= Athletics at the 1930 Central American and Caribbean Games =

The athletics competition in the 1930 Central American and Caribbean Games were held in Havana, Cuba.

== Medal summary ==
=== Men's events ===
| Event | Gold | | Silver | | Bronze | |
|---|---|---|---|---|---|---|
| 100 metres | Alberto Torriento; Cuba | 11.1 | Gustavo Alfonso; Cuba | | Reginald Bedford; Panama | |
| 200 metres | Reginald Bedford; Panama | 22.2 | Eugenio Guerra; Puerto Rico | | Mario Gómez; Mexico | |
| 400 metres | Reginald Bedford; Panama | 49.6 | José Moraila; Mexico | | Luciano Iturbe; Mexico | |
| 800 metres | Darío Álvarez; Cuba | 2:00.6 | Luciano Iturbe; Mexico | | Juan Gutsens; Cuba | |
| 1500 metres | Darío Álvarez; Cuba | 4:18.2 | Pedro Lugo; Mexico | | Enrique Velasco; Mexico | |
| 5000 metres | Felipe Jardines; Mexico | 16:28.0 | Ascencio Galicia; Mexico | | Delfino Campos; Mexico | |
| 10,000 metres | Felipe Jardines; Mexico | 35:21.6 | Francisco Morales; Mexico | | Antonio Rodríguez; Costa Rica | |
| 110 metres hurdles | Fernando Navarro; Panama | 15.6 | José Sorzano; Cuba | | Carlos Molina; Guatemala | |
| 400 metres hurdles | Porfirio Franca; Cuba | 58.4 | Francisco Montalvo; Cuba | | José María Suárez; Cuba | |
| 4 × 100 metres relay | Cuba; Alberto Torriente; Conrado Rodríguez; Gustavo Alfonso; Julio Seino | 43.4 | Mexico; Francisco Robledo; Mario García; José R. del Río; Mario Gómez | 44.0e | Panama; Rafael Arana; Antonio R. Jaén; Alberto Belisario; Reginald Bedford | 44.0e |
| 4 × 400 metres relay | Mexico; José M. Alvarez; Carlos de Anda; Lucílo Iturbe; Jesús Moraila | 3:26.6 | Cuba; Mario González; Juan Gutsens; José Suárez; Horacio Gómez | 3:30.2e | Guatemala; Gonzalo Palarea; Manuel Hernández; Ricardo Dastin; Carlos Lara | |
| High jump | Rafael Pérez; Cuba | 1.75 | Joseph MacKenzie; Jamaica | 1.75 | Fernando Navarro; Panama | 1.70 |
| Pole vault | Humberto Villa; Cuba | 3.64 | Manuel Luciano; Puerto Rico | 3.64 | José Sanjurjo; Cuba | 3.48 |
| Long jump | Fernando Navarro; Panama | 6.72 | Carlos Zamarripa; Mexico | 6.60 | José Torriente; Cuba | 6.57 |
| Triple jump | Manuel Suárez; Cuba | 13.71 | Manuel García; Cuba | 13.14 | José Fernández; Cuba | 13.04 |
| Shot put | Juan Mendizabal; Cuba | 12.25 | Armando Rodríguez; Honduras | 12.10 | Ricardo Villar; Cuba | 11.92 |
| Discus throw | Miguel Gutiérrez; Cuba | 41.12 | René de la Torre; Cuba | 34.35 | Rafael Martínez; Cuba | 34.31 |
| Hammer throw | Francisco Robledo; Mexico | 41.05 | Troadio Hernández; Cuba | 40.98 | Oswaldo Duyos; Cuba | 36.84 |
| Javelin throw | Porfirio Espinosa; Cuba | 50.57 | Cándido González; Cuba | 50.30 | Mario Robau; Cuba | 49.53 |
| Pentathlon | Alberto Fernández; Cuba | 3051 | Fernando Navarro; Panama | 2846 | Miguel Gutiérrez; Cuba | 2789 |

== Medal table ==
| Rank | Nation | Gold | Silver | Bronze | Total |
|---|---|---|---|---|---|
| 1 | Cuba (CUB) | 12 | 8 | 10 | 30 |
| 2 | Mexico (MEX) | 4 | 7 | 4 | 15 |
| 3 | Panama (PAN) | 4 | 1 | 3 | 8 |
| 4 | Puerto Rico (PUR) | 0 | 2 | 0 | 2 |
| 5 | Honduras (HON) | 0 | 1 | 0 | 1 |
| 5 | Jamaica (JAM) | 0 | 1 | 0 | 1 |
| 7 | Guatemala (GUA) | 0 | 0 | 2 | 2 |
| 8 | Costa Rica (CRC) | 0 | 0 | 1 | 1 |
| Totals (8 entries) | | 20 | 20 | 20 | 60 |
