= Reginald Beckford =

Panamanian sprinter

Medal record

Men's athletics

Representing Panama

Central American and Caribbean Games
Gold medal – first place	1930 Havana	200 m
Gold medal – first place	1930 Havana	400 m
Bronze medal – third place	1930 Havana	100 m
Bronze medal – third place	1935 San Salvador	100 m

Reginald Beckford was a Panamanian sprinter and businessman. In 1930, during the Central American Games in Havana, Cuba, Beckford distinguished himself as the first Panamanian to obtain a gold medal at an international sporting event.

== Sources ==
- Chronology of Panamanian Athletics (Spanish)
- Central American and Caribbean Games
- History of Panama (Spanish)
