= Salvador Alanís =

Mexican triple jumper

Personal information
- Full name: Salvador Alanís Duque
- Born: 9 November 1912 San Luis Potosí City, Mexico
- Died: 26 July 1998 (aged 85) Cuauhtémoc, Mexico
- Height: 180 cm (5 ft 11 in)

Sport
- Sport: Athletics
- Event: Triple jump
Medal record
Representing Mexico
Men's athletics
Central American and Caribbean Games
Bronze medal – third place	1935 San Salvador	Triple jump
Men's volleyball
Central American and Caribbean Games
Silver medal – second place	1938 Panama City	Team

Salvador Alanís Duque (Note: In this Spanish name, the first or paternal surname is Alanís and the second or maternal family name is Duque.) (9 November 1912 – 26 July 1998) was a Mexican athlete. He competed in the men's triple jump at the 1932 Summer Olympics, and was the first Mexican to compete in the event at the Olympics. Alanís also won bronze in the triple jump at the 1935 Central American and Caribbean Games, and a silver in the men's volleyball tournament at the 1938 Central American and Caribbean Games. He served as the vicepresident of the Mexican Athletics Federation (FMA) during the 1968 Summer Olympics, and as the technical director of the Confederación Deportiva Mexicana during the 1974 Central American and Caribbean Games.
