= Roberto Sánchez (hurdler) =

Mexican hurdler

Medal record

Men's athletics

Representing Mexico

Central American and Caribbean Games
Gold medal – first place	1935 San Salvador	110 m hurdles
Bronze medal – third place	1938 Panama	110 m hurdles

Roberto Sánchez Ramírez (18 July 1910 – 20 September 1946) was a Mexican hurdler who competed in the 1932 Summer Olympics. He was born in Teocaltiche, Jalisco.
