= Juan Morales (distance runner) =

Mexican long-distance runner

Medal record

Men's athletics

Representing Mexico

Central American and Caribbean Games
| Gold medal – first place | 1935 San Salvador | 10,000 m |
| Silver medal – second place | 1935 San Salvador | 5,000 m |

Juan Morales Rodríguez (born 1 October 1909, date of death unknown) was a Mexican long-distance runner who competed in the 1932 Summer Olympics.
