= Julia Díaz =

- Born: May 23, 1917; Cojutepeque, El Salvador
- Died: October 22, 1999 (aged 82); San Salvador, El Salvador
- Occupation: Artist

Julia Díaz (May 23, 1917 – October 22, 1999) was a Salvadorian painter who most famously painted the artwork "Woman" in 1944 which was offered at auction at Clars Auction Gallery in 2024, which was sold for 33% more than the expected price. A contemporary art foundation was set up in her name in San Salvador after her death, called the Fundación Julia Díaz
