= Francisco Robledo =

Mexican hammer thrower

Medal record

Men's athletics

Representing Mexico

Central American and Caribbean Games
Gold medal – first place	1930 Havana	Hammer throw

Francisco Domingo Dávila Robledo (born 1909 in Mexico City - date of death unknown) was a Mexican hammer thrower who competed in the 1932 Summer Olympics.
