= Conrado Rodríguez =

Cuban baseball player

- Pitcher
- Born: 1884; Cuba
- Died: Unknown
- Threw: Right

Negro league baseball debut
- 1909, for the Cuban Stars (West)

Last appearance
- 1909, for the Cuban Stars (West)

Teams
- Cuban Stars (West) (1909)

Conrado Rodríguez López (born 1884) was a Cuban professional baseball pitcher in the Negro leagues and the Cuban League in the 1900s and 1910s.

A native of Cuba, Rodríguez played in the Negro leagues in 1909 for the Cuban Stars (West). He also spent several seasons in the Cuban League between 1907 and 1916 with Club Fé, Almendares, and Habana.
