= Manuel Álvarez (sprinter) =

Mexican sprinter

José Manuel Álvarez (10 June 1910 – 8 June 1991) was a Mexican sprinter who competed in the 1932 Summer Olympics in the 400 m and 4 × 400 m relay. He won gold and silver medals at the Central American and Caribbean Games.
