= Athletics at the 1948 Summer Olympics =

Coordinates: 51.5556°N 0.2797°W

Athletics at the Games of the XIV Olympiad
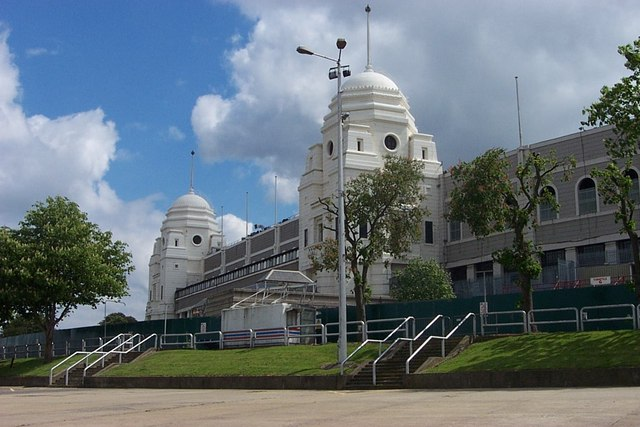
- Host stadium (shown in 2002)
- No. of events: 33
- Competitors: 745 from 53 nations

At the 1948 Summer Olympics in London, 33 athletics events were contested, 24 for men and 9 for women. Three events made their Olympic debut at these Games: women's 200 metres, women's long jump and women's shot put. There were a total number of 745 participating athletes from 53 countries.

== Medal summary ==
Rank	Nation	Gold	Silver	Bronze	Total
1	United States	12	5	10	27
2	Sweden	5	3	5	13
3	Netherlands	4	0	2	6
4	France	2	3	3	8
5	Hungary	2	0	1	3
6	Australia	1	3	2	6
7	Italy	1	3	1	5
8	Finland	1	2	0	3
8	Jamaica	1	2	0	3
10	Argentina	1	1	0	2
10	Czechoslovakia	1	1	0	2
12	Austria	1	0	1	2
12	Belgium	1	0	1	2
14	Great Britain	0	6	1	7
15	Switzerland	0	1	1	2
16	Ceylon	0	1	0	1
16	Norway	0	1	0	1
16	Yugoslavia	0	1	0	1
19	Panama	0	0	2	2
20	Canada	0	0	1	1
20	Denmark	0	0	1	1
20	Turkey	0	0	1	1
Totals (22 entries)		33	33	33	99

=== Men ===
Event	Gold		Silver		Bronze	
100 metres	Harrison Dillard; United States	10.3	Barney Ewell; United States	10.4	Lloyd LaBeach; Panama	10.6
200 metres	Mel Patton; United States	21.1	Barney Ewell; United States	21.1	Lloyd LaBeach; Panama	21.2
400 metres	Arthur Wint; Jamaica	46.2	Herb McKenley; Jamaica	46.4	Mal Whitfield; United States	46.8
800 metres	Mal Whitfield; United States	1:49.2 (OR)	Arthur Wint; Jamaica	1:49.5	Marcel Hansenne; France	1:49.8
1500 metres	Henry Eriksson; Sweden	3:49.8	Lennart Strand; Sweden	3:50.4	Willem Slijkhuis; Netherlands	3:50.4
5000 metres	Gaston Reiff; Belgium	14:17.6 (OR)	Emil Zátopek; Czechoslovakia	14:17.8	Willem Slijkhuis; Netherlands	14:26.8
10,000 metres	Emil Zátopek; Czechoslovakia	29:59.6 (OR)	Alain Mimoun; France	30:47.4	Bertil Albertsson; Sweden	30:53.6
110 metres hurdles	William Porter; United States	13.9 (OR)	Clyde Scott; United States	14.1	Craig Dixon; United States	14.1
400 metres hurdles	Roy Cochran; United States	51.1 (OR)	Duncan White; Ceylon	51.8	Rune Larsson; Sweden	52.2
3000 metres steeplechase	Tore Sjöstrand; Sweden	9:04.6	Erik Elmsäter; Sweden	9:08.2	Göte Hagström; Sweden	9:11.8
4 × 100 metres relay	United States; Barney Ewell; Lorenzo Wright; Harrison Dillard; Mel Patton	40.6	Great Britain; Alastair McCorquodale; Jack Gregory; Ken Jones; Jack Archer	41.3	Italy; Michele Tito; Enrico Perucconi; Carlo Monti; Antonio Siddi	41.5
4 × 400 metres relay	United States; Roy Cochran; Cliff Bourland; Arthur Harnden; Mal Whitfield	3:10.4	France; Jean Kerebel; Francis Schewetta; Robert Chef d'Hôtel; Jacques Lunis	3:14.8	Sweden; Kurt Lundquist; Lars-Erik Wolfbrandt; Folke Alnevik; Rune Larsson	3:16.0
Marathon	Delfo Cabrera; Argentina	2:34:51.6	Tom Richards; Great Britain	2:35:07.6	Étienne Gailly; Belgium	2:35:33.6
10 kilometres walk	John Mikaelsson; Sweden	45:13.2 (OR)	Ingemar Johansson; Sweden	45:43.8	Fritz Schwab; Switzerland	46:00.2
50 kilometres walk	John Ljunggren; Sweden	4:41:52	Gaston Godel; Switzerland	4:48:17	Tebbs Lloyd Johnson; Great Britain	4:48:31
High jump	John Winter; Australia	1.98 m	Bjørn Paulson; Norway	1.95 m	George Stanich; United States	1.95 m
Pole vault	Guinn Smith; United States	4.30 m	Erkki Kataja; Finland	4.20 m	Bob Richards; United States	4.20 m
Long jump	Willie Steele; United States	7.825 m	Bill Bruce; Australia	7.55 m	Herb Douglas; United States	7.54 m
Triple jump	Arne Åhman; Sweden	15.40 m	George Avery; Australia	15.36 m	Ruhi Sarıalp; Turkey	15.02 m
Shot put	Wilbur Thompson; United States	17.12 m (OR)	Jim Delaney; United States	16.68 m	Jim Fuchs; United States	16.42 m
Discus throw	Adolfo Consolini; Italy	52.78 m (OR)	Giuseppe Tosi; Italy	51.78 m	Fortune Gordien; United States	50.77 m
Hammer throw	Imre Németh; Hungary	56.07 m	Ivan Gubijan; Yugoslavia	54.27 m	Robert Bennett; United States	53.73 m
Javelin throw	Tapio Rautavaara; Finland	69.77 m	Steve Seymour; United States	67.56 m	József Várszegi; Hungary	67.03 m
Decathlon	Bob Mathias; United States	7139	Ignace Heinrich; France	6974	Floyd Simmons; United States	6950

=== Women ===
Games	Gold		Silver		Bronze	
100 metres	Fanny Blankers-Koen; Netherlands	11.9	Dorothy Manley; Great Britain	12.2	Shirley Strickland; Australia	12.2
200 metres	Fanny Blankers-Koen; Netherlands	24.4 (OR)	Audrey Williamson; Great Britain	25.1	Audrey Patterson; United States	25.2
80 metres hurdles	Fanny Blankers-Koen; Netherlands	11.2 (OR)	Maureen Gardner; Great Britain	11.2	Shirley Strickland; Australia	11.4
4 × 100 metres relay	Netherlands; Xenia Stad-de Jong; Netty Witziers-Timmer; Gerda van der Kade-Koudijs; Fanny Blankers-Koen	47.5	Australia; Shirley Strickland; June Maston; Betty McKinnon; Joyce King	47.6	Canada; Viola Myers; Nancy Mackay; Diane Foster; Patricia Jones	47.8
High jump	Alice Coachman; United States	1.68 m (OR)	Dorothy Tyler; Great Britain	1.68 m (OR)	Micheline Ostermeyer; France	1.61 m
Long jump	Olga Gyarmati; Hungary	5.695 m (OR)	Noemí Simonetto; Argentina	5.60 m	Ann-Britt Leyman; Sweden	5.575 m
Shot put	Micheline Ostermeyer; France	13.75 m (OR)	Amelia Piccinini; Italy	13.09 m	Ine Schäffer; Austria	13.08 m
Discus throw	Micheline Ostermeyer; France	41.92 m	Edera Cordiale; Italy	41.17 m	Jacqueline Mazéas; France	40.47 m
Javelin throw	Herma Bauma; Austria	45.57 m (OR)	Kaisa Parviainen; Finland	43.79 m	Lily Carlstedt; Denmark	42.08 m

== Participating Nations ==
- Argentina (24)
- Australia (20)
- Austria (16)
- Belgium (18)
- Bermuda (6)
- Brazil (12)
- Burma (1)
- Canada (28)
- Ceylon (3)
- Chile (15)
- Republic of China (3)
- Colombia (2)
- Cuba (3)
- Czechoslovakia (11)
- Denmark (16)
- Egypt (2)
- Finland (36)
- France (67)
- Great Britain (80)
- Greece (16)
- Guyana (1)
- Hungary (13)
- Iceland (12)
- India (8)
- Iraq (2)
- Ireland (13)
- Italy (25)
- Jamaica (10)
- South Korea (9)
- Liechtenstein (2)
- Luxembourg (7)
- Malta (1)
- Mexico (5)
- Netherlands (23)
- New Zealand (4)
- Norway (20)
- Pakistan (5)
- Panama (1)
- Peru (9)
- Philippines (1)
- Poland (8)
- Portugal (6)
- Puerto Rico (4)
- Singapore (1)
- South Africa (6)
- Spain (12)
- Sweden (49)
- Switzerland (23)
- Trinidad and Tobago (3)
- Turkey (13)
- United States (81)
- Uruguay (5)
- Yugoslavia (15)

== Records broken ==
14 new Olympic records were set in the athletics events. No new world records were set.

=== Men's Olympic records ===
Event	Date	Round	Name	Nationality	Result
800 metres	2 August	Final	Mal Whitfield	United States	1:49.2
5000 metres	2 August	Final	Gaston Reiff	Belgium	14:17.6
10,000 metres	30 July	Final	Emil Zátopek	Czechoslovakia	29:59.6
110 metres hurdles	4 August	Final	William Porter	United States	13.9
400 metres hurdles	31 July	Final	Roy Cochran	United States	51.1
10 kilometres walk	7 August	Final	John Mikaelsson	Sweden	45:13.2
Shot put	3 August	Final	Wilbur Thompson	United States	17.12 m
Discus throw	2 August	Final	Adolfo Consolini	Italy	52.78 m

=== Women's Olympic records ===
Event	Date	Round	Name	Nationality	Result
200 metres	6 August	Final	Fanny Blankers-Koen	Netherlands	24.4
80 metres hurdles	4 August	Final	Fanny Blankers-Koen; Maureen Gardner	Netherlands; Great Britain	11.2
High jump	7 August	Final	Alice Coachman; Dorothy Tyler	United States; Great Britain	1.68 m
Long jump	4 August	Final	Olga Gyarmati	Hungary	5.695 m
Shot put	4 August	Final	Micheline Ostermeyer	France	13.75 m
Javelin throw	31 July	Final	Herma Bauma	Austria	45.57 m
