= Canada at the 1948 Summer Olympics =

- IOC code: CAN
- NOC: Canadian Olympic Committee

in London, United Kingdom July 29–August 14, 1948
- Competitors: 118 in 13 sports
- Flag bearer: Robert McFarlane
- Medals Ranked 25th: Gold 0 Silver 1 Bronze 2 Total 3

Summer Olympics appearances (overview)
- 1900; 1904; 1908; 1912; 1920; 1924; 1928; 1932; 1936; 1948; 1952; 1956; 1960; 1964; 1968; 1972; 1976; 1980; 1984; 1988; 1992; 1996; 2000; 2004; 2008; 2012; 2016; 2020; 2024; 2028

Other related appearances
- 1906 Intercalated Games

Canada competed at the 1948 Summer Olympics in London, England. 118 competitors, 100 men and 18 women, took part in 80 events in 13 sports.

== Medallists ==
=== Silver ===
- Douglas Bennett – Canoeing, men's C-1 1000 metres

=== Bronze ===
- Norman Lane – Canoeing, men's C-1 10000 metres
- Viola Myers, Nancy MacKay, Diane Foster, Patricia Jones – Athletics, women's 4×100 metre relay

== Athletics ==
Men's 100 metres

- Edward Haggis
- James O'Brien

Men's 200 metres

- Edward Haggis
- Donald Pettie

Men's 400 metres

- Ernest McCullough
- Bob McFarlane
- Don McFarlane

Men's 800 metres

- Ezra Henniger
- Jack Hutchins
- William Parnell

Men's 1500 metres

- Jack Hutchins
- William Parnell
- Clifford Salmond

Men's 5000 metres

- Clifford Salmond

Men's 4 × 100 m relay

- Edward Haggis, Don McFarlane, James O'Brien, and Donald Pettie

Men's 4 × 400 m relay

- William Larochelle, Ernest McCullough, Bob McFarlane, and Don McFarlane

Men's marathon

- Gérard Côté
- Lloyd Evans
- Walter Fedorick

Men's 400m hurdles

- William Larochelle

Men's shot put

- Eric Coy

Men's discus throw

- Eric Coy

Men's high jump

- Arthur Jackes

Men's javelin throw

- Leo Roininen

Men's Decathlon

- Lionel Fournier

Women's 100 metres

- Millicent Cousins
- Patricia Jones
- Viola Myers

Women's 200 metres

- Millicent Cousins
- Diane Foster
- Donna Gilmore

Women's high jump

- Shirley Olafsson
- Elaine Silburn
- Doreen Wolff

Women's long jump

- Elaine Silburn

Women's 4 × 100 m relay

- Viola Myers, Nancy MacKay, Diane Foster, and Patricia Jones

== Basketball ==
Men's team competition

- Preliminary round (group A)
  - Defeated Italy (55-37)
  - Defeated Great Britain (44-24)
  - Lost to Hungary (36-37)
  - Lost to Brazil (35-57)
  - Defeated Uruguay (52-50)
- Classification matches
  - 9th/16th place: defeated Iran (81-25)
  - 9th/12th place: defeated Belgium (45-40)
  - 9th/10th place: defeated Peru (49-43) → Ninth place
- Team roster
  - Ole Bakken
  - William Bell
  - David Bloomfield
  - David Campbell
  - Harry Kermode
  - Bennie Lands
  - Patrick McGeer
  - James Reid Mitchell
  - Mendy Morein
  - Gary Neville Munro
  - Robert Scarr
  - Sidney Strulovitch
  - Sol Tolchinsky
  - Murray Waxman

== Boxing ==
Men's flyweight (– 51 kg)

- Joey Sandulo

Men's bantamweight (– 54 kg)

- Frederick Daigle

Men's featherweight (– 57 kg)

- Armand Savoie

Men's lightweight (– 60 kg)

- Edward Haddad

Men's welterweight (– 69 kg)

- Clifford Blackburn

Men's middleweight (– 75 kg)

- John Keenan

Men's Heavyweight (– 91 kg)

- Adam Faul

== Cycling ==
Six cyclists, all men, represented Canada in 1948.

Individual road race

- Lorne Atkinson
- Florent Jodoin
- Lance Pugh
- Laurent Tessier

Team road race

- Lorne Atkinson
- Florent Jodoin
- Lance Pugh
- Laurent Tessier

Sprint

- Bob Lacourse

Time trial

- Lorne Atkinson

Team pursuit

- Lorne Atkinson
- William Hamilton
- Lance Pugh
- Laurent Tessier

== Diving ==
Men

Athlete	Event	Final	
Athlete	Event	Points	Rank
George Athans	3 m springboard	114.13	9
George Athans	10 m platform	100.91	8

== Fencing ==
Six fencers, four men and two women, represented Canada in 1948.

Men's foil

- Alf Horn
- Georges Pouliot
- Roland Asselin

Men's team foil

- Robert Desjarlais, Georges Pouliot, Alf Horn, Roland Asselin

Men's épée

- Alf Horn
- Roland Asselin
- Georges Pouliot

Men's team épée

- Robert Desjarlais, Alf Horn, Roland Asselin, Georges Pouliot

Men's sabre

- Roland Asselin

Men's team sabre

- Robert Desjarlais, Alf Horn, Roland Asselin, Georges Pouliot

Women's foil

- Rhoda Martin
- Betty Hamilton

== Rowing ==
Canada had eleven male rowers participate in two out of seven rowing events in 1948.

Men's double sculls

- Gabriel Beaudry
- Fred Graves

Men's eight

- Peter Green
- Robert Christmas
- Art Griffiths
- Alfred Stefani
- Marvin Hammond
- Jack Zwirewich
- Bill McConnell
- Ron Cameron
- Walt Robertson (cox)

== Sailing ==
Men's Finn

- Paul McLaughlin

Men's Star

- Gerald Fairhead and Norman Gooderham

Men's Swallow

- John Robertson and Richard Townsend

== Swimming ==
Men

Athlete	Event	Heat		Semifinal		Final	
Athlete	Event	Time	Rank	Time	Rank	Time	Rank
Eric Jubb	100 m freestyle	1:02.8	31	Did not advance			
Peter Salmon	100 m freestyle	1:01.0	=18	Did not advance			
Doug Gibson	400 m freestyle	5:13.4	27	Did not advance			
Allen Gilchrist	400 m freestyle	5:21.5	33	Did not advance			
Doug Gibson	1500 m freestyle	21:25.6	30	Did not advance			
Allen Gilchrist	1500 m freestyle	23:00.6	38	Did not advance			
Eric Jubb	100 m backstroke	1:14.3	5*	Did not advance			
Peter Mingie	100 m backstroke	1:13.2	5*	Did not advance			
Peter Salmon	200 m breaststroke	3:01.5	27	Did not advance			
Doug Gibson; Eric Jubb; Allen Gilchrist; Peter Salmon	4 × 200 metre freestyle relay	9:43.2	6*	—N/a		Did not advance	

*Ranks given are within the heat.

Women

Athlete	Event	Heat		Semifinal		Final	
Athlete	Event	Time	Rank	Time	Rank	Time	Rank
Kay McNamee	100 m freestyle	1:13.3	27	Did not advance			
Irene Strong	100 m freestyle	1:13.5	28	Did not advance			
Vivian King	400 m freestyle	5:54.8	16 Q	5:52.7	15	Did not advance	
Kay McNamee	400 m freestyle	5:58.7	17	Did not advance			
Joyce Court	100 m backstroke	1:26.8	23	Did not advance			
Irene Strong	200 m breaststroke	3:14.2	5 q*	3:16.9	8*	Did not advance	
Kay McNamee; Joyce Court; Vivian King; Irene Strong	4 × 100 metre freestyle relay	5:04.5	6*	—N/a		Did not advance	

*Ranks given are within the heat.
