= Athletics at the 1948 Summer Olympics – Women's 100 metres =

Women's 100 metres at the Games of the XIV Olympiad
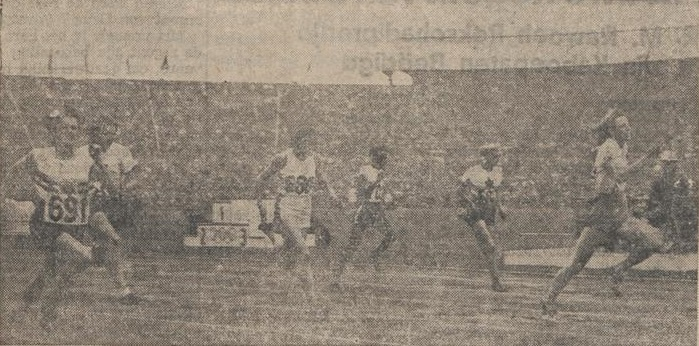
- 100m final
- Venue: Empire Stadium
- Dates: July 31, 1948 (heats); August 2, 1948 (semifinals and final)
- Competitors: 33 from 20 nations
- Winning time: 11.9

Medalists
1st place, gold medalist(s)		Fanny Blankers-Koen; Netherlands
2nd place, silver medalist(s)		Dorothy Manley; Great Britain
3rd place, bronze medalist(s)		Shirley Strickland; Australia

Video on YouTube Official Video @32:45

The women's 100 metres sprint event at the 1948 Olympic Games took place July 31 and August 2. The final was won by Dutchwoman Fanny Blankers-Koen.

== Records ==
Prior to the competition, the existing World and Olympic records were as follows.

World record Olympic record	Helen Stephens (USA)	11.5 s	Berlin, Germany	4 August 1936

== Schedule ==
All times are British Summer Time (UTC+1).

Date	Time	
Saturday, 31 July 1948	14:45	Round 1
Monday, 2 August 1948	15:30; 16:45	Semifinals; Finals

== Results ==
=== Round 1 ===
The fastest two runners in each heat advanced to the semifinals.

==== Heat 1 ====
Wind: 0.0 m/s

Rank	Athlete	Nation	Time (hand)	Time (automatic)	Notes
1	Fanny Blankers-Koen	Netherlands	12.0	12.1	Q
2	Viola Myers	Canada	12.5		Q
3	Betty McKinnon	Australia	12.7		
4	Maria Oberbreyer	Austria	–		
–	Jolán Mertin	Hungary	DNS		

==== Heat 2 ====
Wind: 0.0 m/s

Rank	Athlete	Nation	Time (hand)	Time (automatic)	Notes
1	Shirley Strickland	Australia	12.4	12.6	Q
2	Birthe Nielsen	Denmark	12.9		Q
3	Noemí Simonetto de Portela	Argentina	13.1		
4	Benedicta de Oliveira	Brazil	13.2e		
5	Tilly Decker	Luxembourg	–		

==== Heat 3 ====
Wind: 0.0 m/s

Rank	Athlete	Nation	Time (hand)	Time (automatic)	Notes
1	Grethe Lovsø Nielsen	Denmark	12.6	12.7	Q
2	Winifred Jordan	Great Britain	12.7		Q
3	Audrey Patterson	United States	12.8		
4	Joyce King	Australia	13.1e		
5	Betty Kretschmer	Chile	–		

==== Heat 4 ====
Wind: +1.0 m/s

Rank	Athlete	Nation	Time (hand)	Time (automatic)	Notes
1	Cynthia Thompson	Jamaica	12.4	12.6	Q
2	Daphne Robb-Hasenjager	South Africa	12.4		Q
3	Mabel Walker	United States	12.8		
4	Millie Cheater	Canada			
–	Léa Caurla	France	DNS		
–	Mavis Evelyn	Jamaica	DNS		

==== Heat 5 ====
Wind: 0.0 m/s

Rank	Athlete	Nation	Time (hand)	Time (automatic)	Notes
1	Doris Batter	Great Britain	12.6	12.7	Q
2	Kathleen Russell	Jamaica	12.9		Q
3	Lillian Young	United States	13.0		
4	Elizabeth Müller	Brazil	13.2e		
–	Lenke Eirandt	Hungary	DNS		

==== Heat 6 ====
Wind: +0.3 m/s

Rank	Athlete	Nation	Time (hand)	Time (automatic)	Notes
1	Dorothy Manley	Great Britain	12.1	12.3	Q
2	Phyllis Lightbourn-Jones	Bermuda	13.0		Q
3	Marie-Thérèse Renard	Belgium	13.6		
–	Zsuzsa Szigeti-Varga	Hungary	DNS		
–	Carmen Phipps	Jamaica	DNS		

==== Heat 7 ====
Wind: 0.0 m/s

Rank	Athlete	Nation	Time (hand)	Notes
1	Olga Šicnerová	Czechoslovakia	12.4	Q
2	Bente Bergendorff	Denmark	12.6	Q
3	Helena de Menezes	Brazil	13.2	
4	Üner Teoman	Turkey	13.6e	
–	Liliane Sprécher	France	DNS	

==== Heat 8 ====
Wind: 0.0 m/s

Rank	Athlete	Nation	Time (hand)	Time (automatic)	Notes
1	Liliana Tagliaferri	Italy	12.8	13.0	Q
2	Xenia Stad-de Jong	Netherlands	12.9		Q
3	Phyllis Edness	Bermuda	13.6		
4	Grete Pavlousek	Austria	–		
5	Alma Butia	Yugoslavia	–		

==== Heat 9 ====
Wind: 0.0 m/s

Rank	Athlete	Nation	Time (hand)	Notes
1	Patricia Jones	Canada	12.7	Q
2	Grietje de Jongh	Netherlands	12.9	Q
3	Jeanine Moussier	France	12.9	
4	Liv Paulsen	Norway	12.9	
–	Elfriede Steurer	Austria	DNS	

=== Semifinals ===
The fastest two runners in each heat advanced to the final.

==== Semifinal 1 ====
Wind: 0.0 m/s

Rank	Athlete	Nation	Time (hand)	Time (automatic)	Notes
1	Fanny Blankers-Koen	Netherlands	12.0	12.3	Q
2	Shirley Strickland	Australia	12.4	12.63	Q
3	Grete Lovso Nielsen	Denmark	12.7	12.94	Q
4	Doris Batter	Great Britain	–	12.96	
5	Liliana Tagliaferri	Italy	–	12.99	
6	Phyllis Lightbourn-Jones	Bermuda	–	13.65	

==== Semifinal 2 ====
Wind: 0.0 m/s

Rank	Athlete	Nation	Time (hand)	Time (automatic)	Notes
1	Dorothy Manley	Great Britain	12.4	12.5	Q
2	Patricia Jones	Canada	12.6	12.61	Q
3	Daphne Robb-Hasenjager	South Africa	12.7	12.66	
4	Bente Bergendorff	Denmark	–	12.82	
5	Xenia Stad-de Jong	Netherlands	–	12.83	
6	Kathleen Russell	Jamaica	–	13.08	

==== Semifinal 3 ====
Wind: 0.0 m/s

Rank	Athlete	Nation	Time (hand)	Time (automatic)	Notes
1	Viola Myers	Canada	12.4	12.7	Q
2	Cynthia Thompson	Jamaica	12.5	12.73	Q
3	Olga Sicnerova	Czechoslovakia	12.5	12.78	
3	Birthe Nielsen	Denmark	12.5	12.79	
5	Winifred Jordan	Great Britain	–	13.52	
6	Grietje de Jongh	Netherlands	–	13.70	

=== Final ===
Wind: 0.0 m/s

Rank	Athlete	Nation	Time (hand)	Time (automatic)	Notes
1st place, gold medalist(s)	Fanny Blankers-Koen	Netherlands	11.9	12.2	
2nd place, silver medalist(s)	Dorothy Manley	Great Britain	12.2	12.40	
3rd place, bronze medalist(s)	Shirley Strickland	Australia	12.2	12.59	
4	Viola Myers	Canada	12.3e	12.63	
5	Patricia Jones	Canada	12.4e	12.69	
6	Cynthia Thompson	Jamaica	12.6e	12.87	
