= Athletics at the 1948 Summer Olympics – Women's 200 metres =

Women's 200 metres at the Games of the XIV Olympiad
- Venue: Olympic Stadium
- Dates: August 5, 1948 (heats and semifinals); August 6, 1948 (final)
- Competitors: 33 from 17 nations
- Winning time: 24.4

Medalists
1st place, gold medalist(s)		Fanny Blankers-Koen; Netherlands
2nd place, silver medalist(s)		Audrey Williamson; Great Britain
3rd place, bronze medalist(s)		Audrey Patterson; United States

Video on YouTube Official Video @ 47:25

The women's 200 metres sprint event at the 1948 Olympic Games took place on August 5 and August 6. The final was won by Dutch athlete Fanny Blankers-Koen. It was the first time this event was included in the Summer Olympics.

== Records ==
Prior to the competition, the existing World record was as follows.

World Record	Stanisława Walasiewicz (POL)	23.6	Warsaw, Poland	4 August 1935

Since it was the first time this event took place, the following new Olympic record was set during this competition:

Date	Event	Athlete	Time	Notes
6 August	Final	Fanny Blankers-Koen (NED)	24.4	OR

== Schedule ==
All times are British Summer Time (UTC+1)

Date	Time	Round
Thursday, 5 August 1948	15:30; 17:00	Round 1 Semifinals
Friday, 6 August 1948	16:30	Final

== Results ==
=== Round 1 ===
Round 1 took place on 5 August. The first two runners from each heat advanced to the semifinals.

Heat 1 – Wind: 0.0 m/s

Rank	Name	Nationality	Time (hand)	Time (automatic)	Notes
1	Fanny Blankers-Koen	Netherlands	25.7	25.9	
2	Liliane Sprécher	France	26.0		
3	Mae Faggs	United States	26.0		
4	Melânia Luz	Brazil	26.6e		
5	Phyllis Edness	Bermuda	–		

Heat 2 – Wind: +1.1 m/s

Rank	Name	Nationality	Time (hand)	Time (automatic)	Notes
1	Cynthia Thompson	Jamaica	25.6	25.7	
2	Sylvia Cheeseman	Great Britain	25.7		
3	Diane Foster	Canada	26.1		
4	Helena de Menezes	Brazil	27.7e		
–	Grete Jenny	Austria	DNS		

Heat 3 – Wind: +1.4 m/s

Rank	Name	Nationality	Time (hand)	Time (automatic)	Notes
1	Joyce King	Australia	25.9	26.1	
2	Phyllis Lightbourne-Jones	Bermuda	27.0		
3	Lucila Pini	Brazil	27.6		
4	Maria-Therese Renard	Belgium	28.5e		
–	Olga Šicnerová	Czechoslovakia	DNF		

Heat 4 – Wind: +1.8 m/s

Rank	Name	Nationality	Time (hand)	Time (automatic)	Notes
1	Daphne Robb-Hasenjager	South Africa	24.4	25.5	
2	Shirley Strickland	Australia	25.1		
3	Nell Jackson	United States	25.8		
4	Donna Gilmore	Canada	–		
5	Alma Butia	Yugoslavia	–		

Heat 5 – Wind: +2.5 m/s

Rank	Name	Nationality	Time (hand)	Time (automatic)	Notes
1	Audrey Patterson	United States	25.5	25.9	
2	Margaret Walker	Great Britain	25.8		
3	Kathleen Russell	Jamaica	26.3		
4	Ann-Britt Leyman	Sweden	26.3e		
5	Tilly Decker	Luxembourg	–		
6	Betty Kretschmer	Chile	–		

Heat 6 – Wind: +1.0 m/s

Rank	Name	Nationality	Time (hand)	Time (automatic)	Notes
1	Betty McKinnon	Australia	25.9	26.1	
2	Rosine Faugouin	France	25.9		
3	Grietje de Jongh	Netherlands	26.2		
4	Grete Pavlousek	Austria	–		
–	Adriana Millard	Chile	DNS		
–	Carmen Phipps	Jamaica	DNS		

Heat 7 – Wind: +0.7 m/s

Rank	Name	Nationality	Time (hand)	Time (automatic)	Notes
1	Audrey Williamson	Great Britain	25.4	25.6	
2	Neeltje Karelse	Netherlands	26.0		
3	Millie Cheater	Canada	26.4		
4	Annegret Weller-Schneider	Chile	DQ		
–	Elisabeth Ranftl	Austria	DNS		
–	Léa Caurla	France	DNS		

=== Semifinals ===
The semifinals took place on 5 August. The top three runners from each heat advanced to the final.

Heat 1 – Wind: +1.7 m/s

Rank	Name	Nationality	Time (hand)	Time (automatic)	Notes
1	Fanny Blankers-Koen	Netherlands	24.3	24.4	
2	Audrey Patterson	United States	25.0	25.02	
3	Margaret Walker	Great Britain	25.3	25.42	
4	Cynthia Thompson	Jamaica	–	25.67	
5	Rosine Faugouin	France	–	25.73	
6	Joyce King	Australia	–	25.78	
7	Phyllis Lightbourne-Jones	Bermuda	–	–	

Heat 2 – Wind: +3.4 m/s

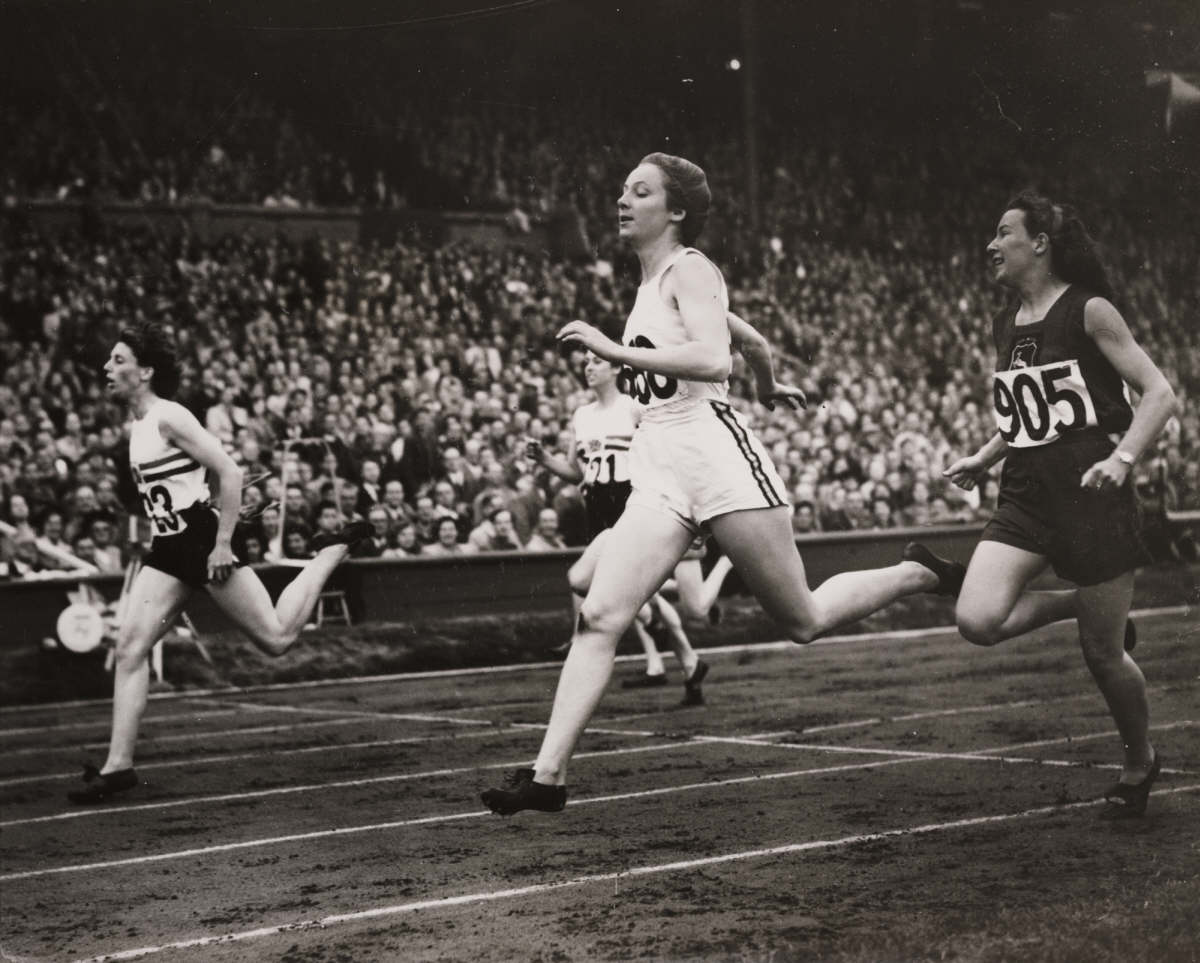
The first dead heat of the Olympic meeting of 1948 occurred in the women’s 200 metres semi final when Shirley Strickland of Australia tied for first place with Audrey Williamson. Daphne Robb of South Africa was placed third.

Rank	Name	Nationality	Time (hand)	Time (automatic)	Notes
1	Shirley Strickland	Australia	24.9	25.1	
2	Audrey Williamson	Great Britain	24.9	25.11	
3	Daphne Robb-Hasenjager	South Africa	25.1	25.22	
4	Sylvia Cheeseman	Great Britain	–	25.48	
5	Neeltje Karelse	Netherlands	–	25.68	
6	Liliane Sprécher	France	–	25.72	
7	Betty McKinnon	Australia	–	25.85	

=== Final ===
Wind: 0.0 m/s

Rank	Name	Nationality	Time (hand)	Time (automatic)	Notes
1st place, gold medalist(s)	Fanny Blankers-Koen	Netherlands	24.4	24.4	OR
2nd place, silver medalist(s)	Audrey Williamson	Great Britain	25.1	25.20	
3rd place, bronze medalist(s)	Audrey Patterson	United States	25.2	25.26	
4	Shirley Strickland	Australia	25.3e	25.25	
5	Margaret Walker	Great Britain	25.6e	25.59	
6	Daphne Robb-Hasenjäger	South Africa	25.7e	25.65	

Key: OR = Olympic record

Despite Strickland's 4th placing in the final, a photo finish of the race (that was not consulted then but discovered in 1975) showed that she had beaten Patterson into 3rd place, a discrepancy that has been recognised by many reputable Olympic historians.
