= Athletics at the 1948 Summer Olympics – Women's 4 × 100 metres relay =

Women's 4 × 100 metres relay at the Games of the XIV Olympiad
- Dates: August 7, 1948 (heats & final)
- Competitors: from 11 nations
- Teams: 11
- Winning time: 47.5

Medalists
1st place, gold medalist(s)		Xenia Stad-de Jong; Netty Witziers-Timmer; Gerda van der Kade-Koudijs; Fanny Blankers-Koen	Netherlands
2nd place, silver medalist(s)		Shirley Strickland; June Maston; Betty McKinnon; Joyce King	Australia
3rd place, bronze medalist(s)		Viola Myers; Nancy Mackay; Diane Foster; Patricia Jones	Canada

Video on YouTube Official Video @ 48:25

The women's 4 × 100 metres relay event at the 1948 Olympic Games took place on August 7. The Dutch team won with a time of 47.5.

== Records ==
Prior to the competition, the existing World and Olympic records were as follows.

World record Olympic record	Germany (Emmy Albus, Marie Dollinger, Ilse Dörffeldt, Käthe Krauß)	46.4	Berlin, Germany	8 August 1936

== Schedule ==
All times are British Summer Time (UTC+1)

Date	Time	Round
Saturday, 7 August 1948	15:15	Round 1
Saturday, 7 August 1948	16:40	Final

== Results ==
=== Round 1 ===
Round 1 took place on 7 August. The first two teams from each heat advanced to the final.

Heat 1

Rank	Nation	Competitors	Time (hand)	Time (auto)	Notes
1	Canada	Diane Foster, Patricia Jones, Nancy Mackay, Viola Myers	47.9	48.00	Q
2	Australia	Joyce King, June Maston, Betty McKinnon, Shirley Strickland	48.0	48.06	Q
3	France	Rosine Faugouin, Jeanine Moussier, Liliane Sprécher, Jeanine Toulouse	48.1	48.10	
4	Brazil	Benedicta de Oliveira, Melânia Luz, Gertrudes Morg, Lucila Pini	49.0	49.12	

Heat 2

Rank	Nation	Competitors	Time (hand)	Time (auto)	Notes
1	Great Britain	Maureen Gardner, Dorothy Manley, Muriel Pletts, Margaret Walker	48.4	48.40	Q
2	Austria	Grete Jenny, Maria Oberbreyer, Grete Pavlousek, Elfriede Steurer	50.0	50.21	Q
3	Chile	Marion Huber, Betty Kretschmer, Adriana Millard, Annegret Weller-Schneider	51.5	51.68	
4	Italy	Mirella Avalle, Anna Maria Cantù, Marcella Jeandeau, Liliana Tagliaferri	DNF		

Heat 3

Rank	Nation	Competitors	Time (hand)	Time (auto)	Notes
1	Netherlands	Fanny Blankers-Koen, Xenia Stad-de Jong, Gerda van der Kade-Koudijs, Netti Witziers-Timmer	47.6	47.60	Q
2	Denmark	Bente Bergendorff, Grethe Lovsø Nielsen, Birthe Nielsen, Hilde Nissen	48.1	48.10	Q
3	United States	Nell Jackson, Theresa Manuel, Mickey Patterson, Mabel Walker	48.5	48.33	

=== Final ===
Rank	Nation	Competitors	Time (hand)	Time (auto)	Notes
1st place, gold medalist(s)	Netherlands	Fanny Blankers-Koen, Xenia Stad-de Jong, Gerda van der Kade-Koudijs, Netti Witziers-Timmer	47.5	47.60	
2nd place, silver medalist(s)	Australia	Joyce King, June Maston, Betty McKinnon, Shirley Strickland	47.6	47.69	
3rd place, bronze medalist(s)	Canada	Diane Foster, Patricia Jones, Nancy Mackay, Viola Myers	47.8	48.08	
4	Great Britain	Maureen Gardner, Dorothy Manley, Muriel Pletts, Margaret Walker	48.0	48.15	
5	Denmark	Bente Bergendorff, Grethe Lovsø Nielsen, Birthe Nielsen, Hilde Nissen	48.2	48.23	
6	Austria	Grete Jenny, Maria Oberbreyer, Grete Pavlousek, Elfriede Steurer	49.2	49.25	

Wind: 0.2 m/s
