= Athletics at the 1948 Summer Olympics – Women's long jump =

Women's long jump at the Games of the XIV Olympiad
- Dates: August 4, 1948 (qualifying and final)
- Competitors: 26 from 17 nations
- Winning distance: 5.695 OR

Medalists
1st place, gold medalist(s)		Olga Gyarmati; Hungary
2nd place, silver medalist(s)		Noemí Simonetto; Argentina
3rd place, bronze medalist(s)		Ann-Britt Leyman; Sweden

The women's long jump event was, for the first time, part of the track and field athletics programme at the 1948 Summer Olympics. The competition was held on August 4, 1948. The final was won by Hungarian Olga Gyarmati.

== Records ==
Prior to the competition, the existing World record was as follows.

World record	Fanny Blankers-Koen (NED)	6.25 m	Leiden, Netherlands	19 September 1943

Since it was the first time this event took place, the following new Olympic record was set during this competition:

Date	Event	Athlete	Time	Notes
4 August	Final	Olga Gyarmati (HUN)	5.695	OR

== Schedule ==
All times are British Summer Time (UTC+1)

Date	Time	Round
Wednesday, 4 August 1948	11:00	Qualifications
Wednesday, 4 August 1948	16:30	Finals

== Results ==
=== Qualifying round ===
Qual. rule: qualification standard 5.30m (Q) or at least best 12 qualified (q).

Rank	Name	Nationality	Result	Notes
1	Yvonne Chabot-Curtet	France	5.640	Q OR
2	Kathleen Russell	Jamaica	5.610	Q
3	Noemí Simonetto de Portela	Argentina	5.560	Q
4	Ann-Britt Leyman	Sweden	5.470	Q
5	Gerda van der Kade-Koudijs	Netherlands	5.440	Q
6	Vinton Beckett	Jamaica	5.435	Q
7	Olga Gyarmati	Hungary	5.430	Q
8	Neeltje Karelse	Netherlands	5.360	Q
9	Maria Oberbreyer	Austria	5.350	Q
10	Ilse Steinegger	Austria	5.300	Q
11	Judy Canty	Australia	5.290	q
11	Emma Reed	United States	5.290	q
13	Kaisa Parviainen	Finland	5.270	
14	Lillian Young	United States	5.260	
15	Silvana Pierucci	Italy	5.235	
16	Phyllis Lightbourn-Jones	Bermuda	5.230	
17	Elaine Silburn	Canada	5.220	
18	Henryka Słomczewska-Nowak	Poland	5.190	
19	Jean Walraven	United States	5.180	
20	Margaret Erskine	Great Britain	5.140	
21	Lorna Lee	Great Britain	5.125	
22	Gertrudes Morg	Brazil	5.120	
23	June Maston	Australia	5.060	
24	Joan Shepherd	Great Britain	5.005	
25	Marguerite Martel	France	4.950	
26	Milly Ludwig	Luxembourg	4.505	
	Spomenka Koledin	Yugoslavia	DNS	
	Ilona Tolnai-Rákhely	Hungary	DNS	
	Fanny Blankers-Koen	Netherlands	DNS	
	Carmen Phipps	Jamaica	DNS	

=== Final standings ===
Rank	Name	Nationality	Distance	Notes
1st place, gold medalist(s)	Olga Gyarmati	Hungary	5.695	OR
2nd place, silver medalist(s)	Noemí Simonetto	Argentina	5.600	
3rd place, bronze medalist(s)	Ann-Britt Leyman	Sweden	5.575	
4	Gerda van der Kade-Koudijs	Netherlands	5.570	
5	Neeltje Karelse	Netherlands	5.545	
6	Kathleen Russell	Jamaica	5.495	
7	Judy Canty	Australia	5.380	
8	Yvonne Chabot-Curtet	France	5.350	
9	Maria Oberbreyer	Austria	5.240	
10	Ilse Steinegger	Austria	5.195	
11	Vinton Beckett	Jamaica	5.145	
12	Emma Reed	United States	4.845	

Key: OR = Olympic record
