= 1944 USA Outdoor Track and Field Championships =

American athletics championship event

- Dates: 17–18 June (men); 8 July (women)
- Host city: New York City, New York (men); Harrisburg, Pennsylvania (women)
- Venue: Downing Stadium (men); Fager Field (women)
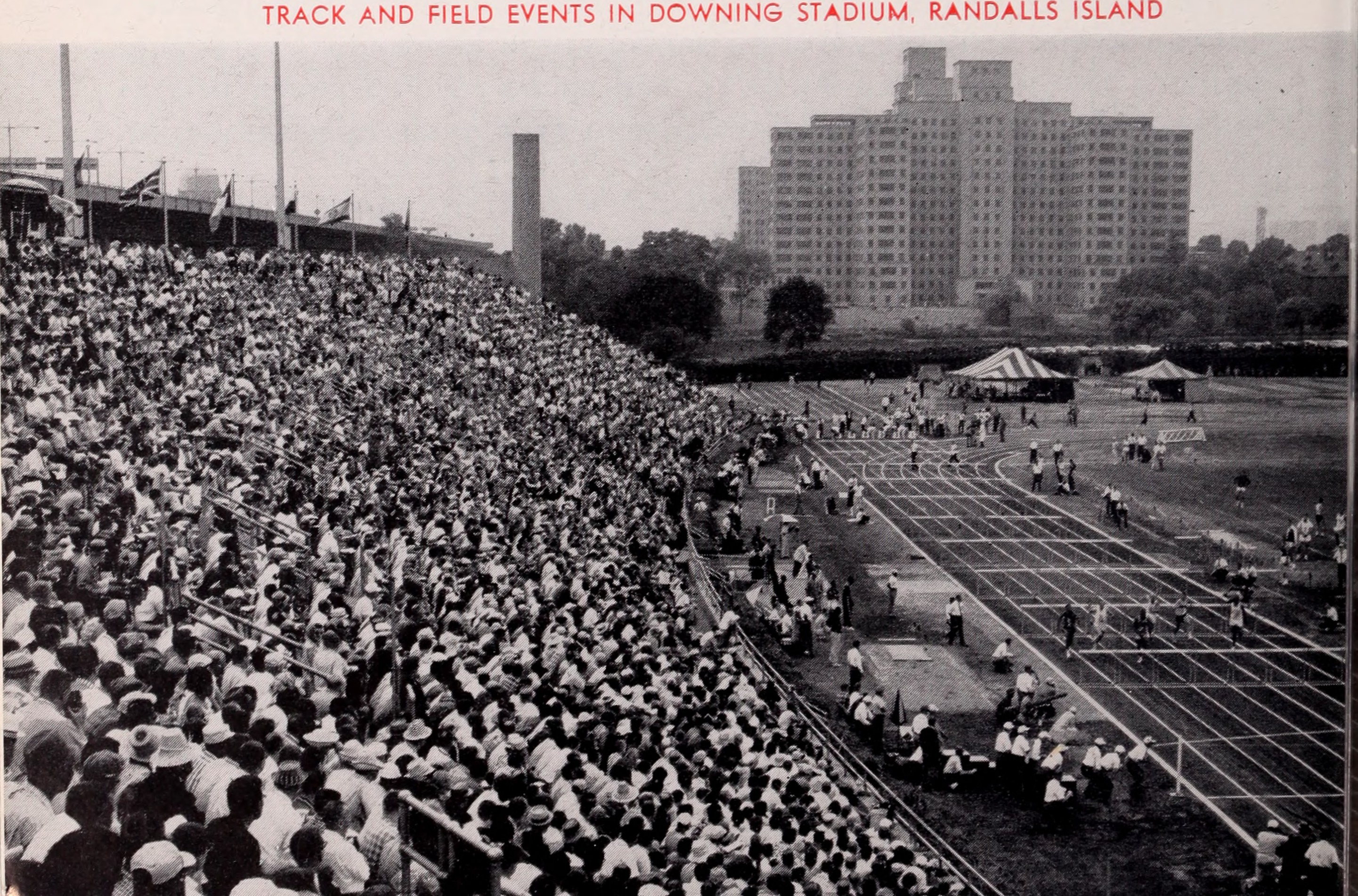

The 1944 USA Outdoor Track and Field Championships were organized by the Amateur Athletic Union (AAU) and served as the national championships in outdoor track and field for the United States.

The men's edition was held at Downing Stadium in New York City, New York, and it took place 17–18 June. The women's meet was held separately at Fager Field in Harrisburg, Pennsylvania, on 8 July.

Due to World War II, the men's athletes did not have much time to train for the championships and notably no meet records were set. In the women's competition, Stella Walsh again won three events, which was the most possible as athletes were not allowed to enter more than three.

== Results ==
=== Men ===
Event	Gold		Silver		Bronze	
100 m	Claude Young	10.5	Eddie Conwell	10.7 e	Norwood Ewell	
200 m	Charles Parker	21.3	Eddie Conwell	21.5 e	Donald Campbell	
400 m	Elmore Harris	48.0	Herbert McKenley (JAM)		James McGuire	
800 m	Robert Kelley	1:51.8	John Fulton	1:52.2	William Hulse	1:52.6
1500 m	William Hulse	3:54.3	James Rafferty	4:00.8	Robert Umstattd	4:04.8
5000 m	James Rafferty	15:22.3	Francis Martin		Norman Bright	
10000 m	Norman Bright	33:53.0	William Marr	200 yards behind	Thomas Crane	
Marathon	Charles Robbins	2:40:48.6	Donald Heinicke	2:45:05.6	Anthony Medeiros	2:45:29.2
110 m hurdles	Owen Cassidy	14.9	William Mohler		Eligio Barberia	
200 m hurdles	Elmore Harris	24.1				
400 m hurdles	Oris Erwin	54.0	Ed Palmieri		Hubert Gates	
3000 m steeplechase	Forrest Efaw	9:39.6	Joseph McCluskey		James Wisner	
2 miles walk	Fred Sharaga	14:08.5				
High jump	Willard Smith	2.00 m	none awarded		David Albritton	1.98 m
High jump	Fred Sheffield	2.00 m	none awarded		Kenneth Whitney	1.98 m
Pole vault	Cornelius Warmerdam	4.57 m	Del Smith	3.96 m	none awarded	
Pole vault	Cornelius Warmerdam	4.57 m	John Schmidt	3.96 m	none awarded	
Pole vault	Cornelius Warmerdam	4.57 m	Milton Padway	3.96 m	none awarded	
Long jump	William Lund	7.10 m	Edward Michalski	6.97 m	Homer Gillis	6.93 m
Triple jump	Don Barksdale	14.38 m	Burton Cox	14.04 m	Raul Lopez	13.73 m
Shot put	Earl Audet	16.05 m	William Watson	15.20 m	Victor Schleich	14.64 m
Discus throw	Hugh Cannon	49.40 m	Bill Bangert	45.67 m	David Schrader	42.19 m
Hammer throw	Henry Dreyer	50.76 m	Irving Folwartshny	47.43 m	Gantt Miller	47.22 m
Javelin throw	Martin Biles	64.31 m	Lowell Todd	62.38 m	William Iannicelli	62.13 m
Weight throw for distance	Frank Berst	38 ft 4 1/4 in (11.69 m)				
Pentathlon	Eulace Peacock	2852 pts				
Decathlon	Irving Mondschein	5748 pts	Wilbur Ross	5224 pts	Nathaniel Boyd	5176 pts

=== Women ===
Event	Gold		Silver		Bronze	
50 m	Alice Coachman	6.4	Lillian Young		Viola Myers	
100 m	Stanislawa Walasiewicz (POL)	12.0	Alice Coachman		Jean Lowe	
200 m	Stanislawa Walasiewicz (POL)	24.6	Rowena Harrison	25.2 e	Mary Cummins	
80 m hurdles	Lillie Purifoy	12.8	Jean Walraven (POL)		Leila Perry	
High jump	Alice Coachman	1.56 m	Nancy Cowperthwaite	1.37 m	Nellie Stafford	1.34 m
High jump	Alice Coachman	1.56 m	Nancy Cowperthwaite	1.37 m	Clara Schroth	1.34 m
Long jump	Stanislawa Walasiewicz (POL)	5.47 m	Rowena Harrison	5.36 m	Jean Kaplan	4.94 m
Shot put (8 lb)	Dorothy Dodson	10.98 m	Mildred Yetter	9.84 m	Cleo Davis	9.82 m
Discus throw	Hattie Turner	30.98 m	Betty Weaver	28.50 m	Pauline Ruppeldt	28.25 m
Javelin throw	Dorothy Dodson	37.53 m	Lillian Davis	31.68 m	Marie Sostar	31.06 m
Baseball throw	Hattie Turner	214 ft 6 in (65.37 m)				

== See also ==
- List of USA Outdoor Track and Field Championships winners (men)
- List of USA Outdoor Track and Field Championships winners (women)
