= 1943 USA Outdoor Track and Field Championships =

American athletics championship event

- Dates: 19–20 June (men); 15 August (women)
- Host city: New York City, New York (men); Lakewood, Ohio (women)
- Venue: Downing Stadium (men); Lakewood High School (women)
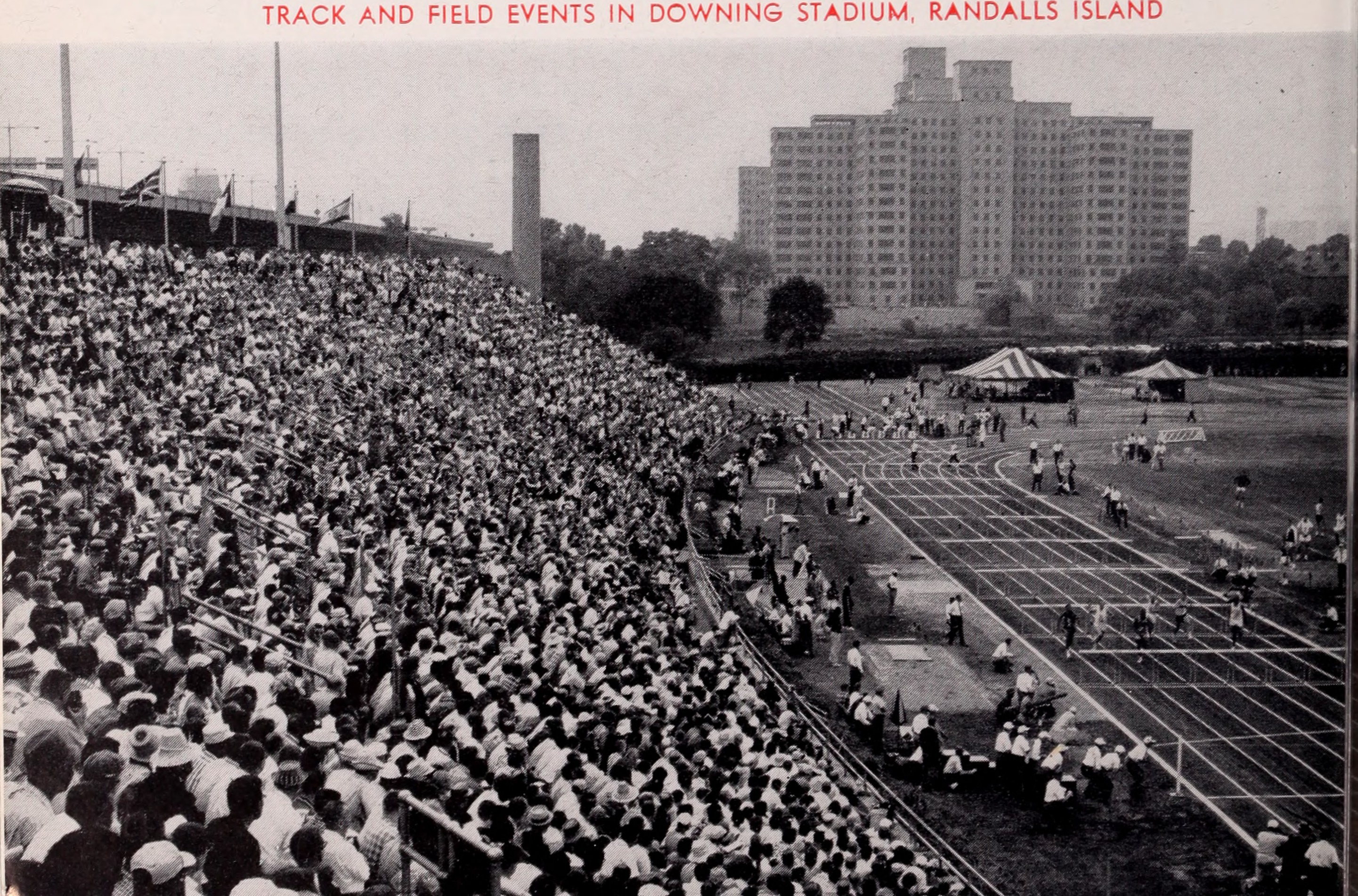

The 1943 USA Outdoor Track and Field Championships were organized by the Amateur Athletic Union (AAU) and served as the national championships in outdoor track and field for the United States.

The men's edition was held at Downing Stadium in New York City, New York, and it took place 19–20 June. The women's meet was held separately at Lakewood High School in Lakewood, Ohio, on 15 August.

It was the first time in men's championships history that no meeting records were set (mostly due to World War II). In the women's competition, Stella Walsh led her Polish Olympic Women's Athletic Club to the team title by winning three events.

== Results ==
=== Men ===
Event	Gold		Silver		Bronze	
100 m	Harold Davis	10.3	Herbert Thompson	10.3 e	Edward Greenidge	
200 m straight	Harold Davis	20.2	Edward Greenidge	21.5 e	George Guida	
400 m	Cliff Bourland	47.7	Francis Cotter	3 yards behind	John Fulton	
800 m	William Hulse	1:53.4	Robert Ufer	1:53.8	Donald Burnham	1:54.4
1500 m	Gilbert Dodds	3:50.0	William Hulse	3:55.4	Fred Wilt	3:55.8
5000 m	Gunder Hägg (SWE)	14:48.5	Gregory Rice		Jerry Thompson	
10000 m	Lou Gregory	33:22.0	James Rafferty		Theodore Vogel	
Marathon	Gérard Côté (CAN)	2:38:35.3	Fred McGlone	2:39:08.5	Clayton Farrar	2:39:30.0
110 m hurdles	Bill Cummins	14.3	James Fieweger		Jack Saunders	
200 m hurdles straight	Bill Cummins	22.1				
400 m hurdles	Oris Erwin	53.1	Bruce Miller	53.6	Hubert Gates	
3000 m steeplechase	Joseph McCluskey	9:39.7	Ray Phillips		Ralph Dewey	
2 miles walk	John Wilson	14:16.9				
High jump	Peter Watkins	2.02 m	Joshua Williamson	2.00 m	Fred Sheffield	1.97 m
Pole vault	Cornelius Warmerdam	4.57 m	Jack DeField	4.27 m	Irving Moore	4.11 m
Pole vault	Cornelius Warmerdam	4.57 m	Jack DeField	4.27 m	Keith Groswird	4.11 m
Long jump	William Christopher	7.43 m	Eulace Peacock	7.33 m	Edsel Curry	7.31 m
Triple jump	Billy Brown	13.84 m	Clarence Lewis	13.65 m	Rundi Toomasuli	13.34 m
Shot put	Earl Audet	16.14 m	Elmer Aussieker	15.71 m	James Delaney	513 7 m
Discus throw	Hugh Cannon	49.12 m	Howard Debus	47.29 m	George Huber	45.97 m
Hammer throw	Henry Dreyer	50.16 m	Irving Folwartshny	47.97 m	George Huber	47.48 m
Javelin throw	Martin Biles	61.69 m	Steve Seymour	60.90 m	William Footrick	55.62 m
Weight throw for distance	Frank Berst	35 ft 2 in (10.71 m)				
Pentathlon	Eulace Peacock	3225 pts				
Decathlon	William Watson	5994 pts	Joshua Williamson	5808 pts	Donald Wanner	5614 pts

=== Women ===
Event	Gold		Silver		Bronze
50 m	Alice Coachman	6.5	Jeanette Jones		Lillian Young
100 m	Stanislawa Walasiewicz (POL)	11.6	Alice Coachman	11.7 e	Rowena Harrison
200 m	Stanislawa Walasiewicz (POL)	26.3	Alice Jagus (POL)		Mary Cummins
80 m hurdles	Nancy Cowperthwaite	12.3	Joan Davis		Leila Perry
High jump	Alice Coachman	1.52 m	Adrienne Robinson		Bernice Robinson
Long jump	Stanislawa Walasiewicz (POL)	5.81 m	Rowena Harrison		Betty Dummeldinger
Shot put (8 lb)	Frances Gorn-Sobczak (POL)	11.56 m	Dorothy Dodson		Mildred Yetter
Discus throw	Frances Gorn-Sobczak (POL)	33.38 m	Betty Weaver		Anne Pallo (POL)
Javelin throw	Dorothy Dodson	33.91 m	Marian Twining		Bessie Leick
Baseball throw	Elaine Grothe	260 ft 6 1/4 in (79.4 m)			

== See also ==
- List of USA Outdoor Track and Field Championships winners (men)
- List of USA Outdoor Track and Field Championships winners (women)
