= 1947 USA Outdoor Track and Field Championships =

American athletics championship event

- Dates: 3–4 July (men); 28-29 June (women)
- Host city: Lincoln, Nebraska (men); San Antonio, Texas (women)
- Venue: Memorial Stadium (men); Alamo Stadium (women)
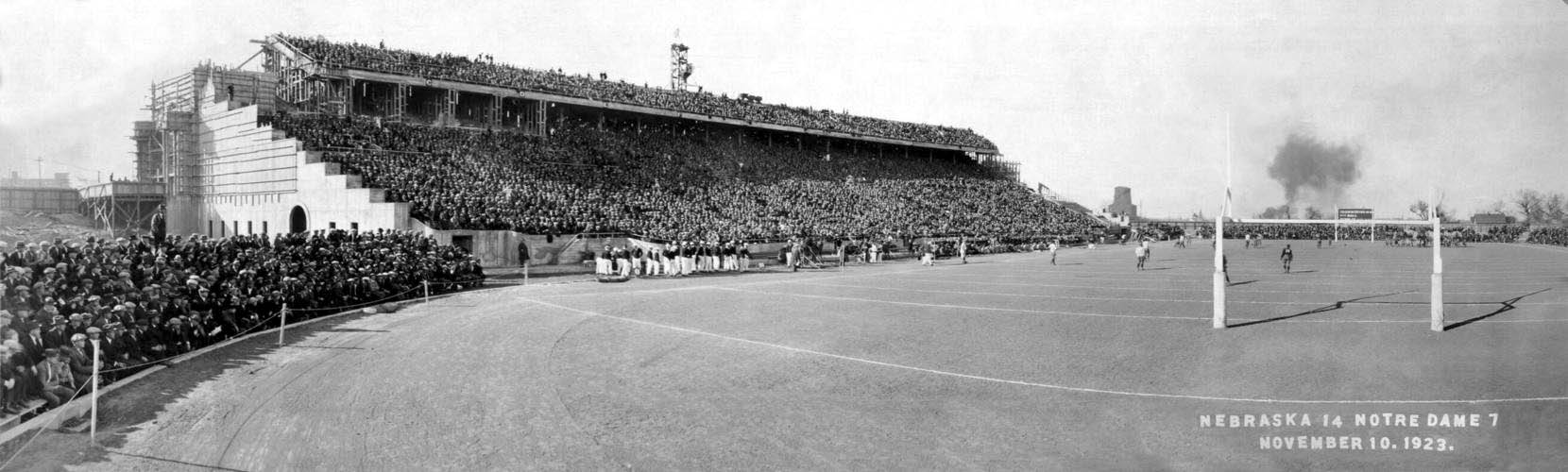

The 1947 USA Outdoor Track and Field Championships were organized by the Amateur Athletic Union (AAU) and served as the national championships in outdoor track and field for the United States.

The men's edition was held at Memorial Stadium in Lincoln, Nebraska, and it took place 3–4 July. The women's meet was held separately at Alamo Stadium in San Antonio, Texas, on 28-29 June.

At the men's championships, Steve Seymour set an American record in the javelin throw. The women's competition featured the "big three" (as described then) of Alice Coachman, Stella Walsh, and Dorothy Dodson.

== Results ==
=== Men ===
Event	Gold		Silver		Bronze	
100 m	William Mathis	10.5	Norwood Ewell		Eddie Conwell	
200 m	Norwood Ewell	21.0	Charles Parker		Joseph Cianciabella	
400 m	Herbert McKenley (JAM)	47.1	David Bolen	47.5 e	George Guida	47.9 e
800 m	Reginald Pearman	1:50.9	Malvin Whitfield	1:51.0	Tarver Perkins	
1500 m	Gerald Karver	3:52.9	William Mack		Donald Gehrmann	
5000 m	Curt Stone	15:02.7	Jerry Thompson		Earef Aydin (TUR)	
10000 m	Edward O'Toole	33:28.3	Browning Ross		Donald Lash	
Marathon	Theodore Vogel	2:40.11	Thomas Crane	2:42.11	William Steiner	2:43.49
110 m hurdles	Harrison Dillard	14.0	Floyd Simmons		Dan Yovetich	
200 m hurdles	Harrison Dillard	23.3				
400 m hurdles	Walter Smith	52.3	Roy Cochran		Lee Hofacre	
3000 m steeplechase	Forrest Efaw	9:32.5	Joseph McCluskey		James Rafferty	
2 miles walk	Ernest Weber	14:10.1				
High jump	David Albritton	1.98 m	Charles Hanger	1.93 m	none awarded	
High jump	David Albritton	1.98 m	Irving Mondschein	1.93 m	none awarded	
High jump	David Albritton	1.98 m	Jack Heintzman	1.93 m	none awarded	
High jump	David Albritton	1.98 m	John Vislocky	1.93 m	none awarded	
High jump	David Albritton	1.98 m	Lester Steers	1.93 m	none awarded	
High jump	David Albritton	1.98 m	Tom Follis	1.93 m	none awarded	
High jump	David Albritton	1.98 m	Tom Scofield	1.93 m	none awarded	
High jump	David Albritton	1.98 m	William Vessie	1.93 m	none awarded	
Pole vault	Richmond Morcom	4.27 m	Earle Meadows	4.27 m	Ray Kring	4.11 m
Pole vault	Richmond Morcom	4.27 m	Earle Meadows	4.27 m	Bob Richards	4.11 m
Pole vault	Richmond Morcom	4.27 m	Earle Meadows	4.27 m	Guinn Smith	4.11 m
Pole vault	Richmond Morcom	4.27 m	Earle Meadows	4.27 m	George Rasmussen	4.11 m
Long jump	William Steele	7.55 m	John Robertson	7.38 m	William Lewis	7.38 m
Triple jump	Robert Beckus	14.00 m	Dick Ganslen	13.85 m	William Albans	13.83 m
Shot put	James Delaney	16.09 m	Fortune Gordien	16.05 m	Stan Lampert	15.91 m
Discus throw	Fortune Gordien	53.07 m	Robert Fitch	52.56 m	Byrl Thompson	47.67 m
Hammer throw	Robert Bennett	55.14 m	Samuel Felton	52.55 m	Edmund Styrna	52.09 m
Javelin throw	Steve Seymour	75.84 m	Martin Biles	72.06 m	Herb Grote	64.11 m
Weight throw for distance	Frank Berst	36 ft 4 1/2 in (11.08 m)				
Pentathlon	John Voight	2972 pts				
Decathlon	Irving Mondschein	6715 pts	Lloyd Duff	6705 pts	Floyd Simmons	6580 pts

=== Women ===
Event	Gold		Silver		Bronze	
50 m	Alice Coachman	6.8	Katherine Geary		Mabel Walker	
100 m	Juanita Watson	13.1	Alice Coachman		Mary Griggs	
200 m	Stanislawa Walasiewicz (POL)	26.2	Audrey Patterson		Nell Jackson	
80 m hurdles	Nancy Cowperthwaite	12.6	Theresa Manuel		Lillie Purifoy	
High jump	Alice Coachman	1.55 m	Emma Reed	1.50 m	Mary Oprea	1.47 m
High jump	Alice Coachman	1.55 m	Emma Reed	1.50 m	Gertrude Orr	1.47 m
Long jump	Lillie Purifoy	5.33 m	Nancy Cowperthwaite		Lillian Young	
Shot put (8 lb)	Dorothy Dodson	11.56 m	Francis Kaszubski (POL)	11.17 m	Katherine Geary	10.91 m
Discus throw	Francis Kaszubski (POL)	33.65 m	Dorothy Dodson	32.66 m	Pauline Ruppeldt	30.12 m
Javelin throw	Dorothy Dodson	37.31 m	Hattie Palmer	34.68 m	Marian Twining	32.28 m
Baseball throw	Marion Barone	252 ft 8 in (77.01 m)				

== See also ==
- List of USA Outdoor Track and Field Championships winners (men)
- List of USA Outdoor Track and Field Championships winners (women)
