= Liliana Tagliaferri =

Italian sprinter

Personal information
- Born: 20 August 1928 (age 97)

Sport
- Country: Italy
- Sport: Track and field
- Event: Sprint

Liliana Tagliaferri (born 20 August 1928) is an Italian sprinter who is twice National Champion at 100 metres and competed in the 1948 Summer Olympics and the 1952 Summer Olympics.

== Biography ==
Tagliaferri won the Italian National Championships twice in the 100 metres in 1948 and 1949, and was 19 years old when she competed in her first Olympic Games in 1948 in London. There she won her first round heat in the 100 metres running in a time of 12.8 seconds, but in the semi-final Tagliaferri was drawn in the same heat as Fanny Blankers-Koen and Shirley Strickland and could only manage to finish in fifth place, thus failing to qualify for the final. With team mates Mirella Avalle, Anna Maria Cantù and Marcella Jeandeau, Tagliaferri also competed in the 4 x 100 metres relay, but they did not finish the race and thus did not advance to the final.

Four years later, Tagliaferri was at the 1952 Summer Olympics in Helsinki, Finland and was competing in the same events as she did in London four years earlier. In the 100 metres she finished in second place in her heat behind American Mae Faggs, in the second round she ran a time of 12.9 seconds and finished last in the heat and thus did not advance in the event. In the 4 × 100 metres relay running with Vittoria Cesarini, Milena Greppi and Giuseppina Leone they were drawn in the same heat as the teams from the United States and Great Britain, so they finished in third place and did not qualify for the final.
