= Athletics at the 1948 Summer Olympics – Women's high jump =

Women's high jump at the Games of the XIV Olympiad
- Venue: Olympic Stadium
- Dates: August 7, 1948 (final)
- Competitors: 19 from 10 nations
- Winning height: 1.68 OR

Medalists
1st place, gold medalist(s)		Alice Coachman; United States
2nd place, silver medalist(s)		Dorothy Tyler; Great Britain
3rd place, bronze medalist(s)		Micheline Ostermeyer; France

The women's high jump event was part of the athletics programme at the 1948 Summer Olympics. The competition was held on 7 August 1948. The final was won by Alice Coachman of the United States who became the first black woman to win an Olympic gold medal.

== Records ==
Prior to the competition, the existing World and Olympic records were as follows.

World record	Fanny Blankers-Koen (NED)	1.71 m	Amsterdam, Netherlands	30 May 1943
Olympic record	Jean Shiley (USA); Babe Didrikson (USA)	1.65 m	Los Angeles, United States	7 August 1932

The following new Olympic record was set during this competition:

Date	Event	Athlete	Time	Notes
7 August	Final	Alice Coachman (USA); Dorothy Tyler (GBR)	1.68 m	OR

== Schedule ==
All times are British Summer Time (UTC+1)

Date	Time	Round
Saturday, 7 August 1948	15:35	Finals

== Results ==
Rank	Athlete	Nationality	1.61	1.64	1.66	1.68	1.70	Result	Notes
1st place, gold medalist(s)	Alice Coachman	United States	o	xo	xo	o	xxx	1.68	OR
2nd place, silver medalist(s)	Dorothy Tyler	Great Britain	o	xxo	o	xo	xxx	1.68	OR
3rd place, bronze medalist(s)	Micheline Ostermeyer	France	xo	xxx				1.61	
4	Vinton Beckett	Jamaica						1.58	
4	Doreen Dredge	Canada						1.58	
6	Bertha Crowther	Great Britain						1.58	
7	Ilse Steinegger	Austria						1.55	
8	Dora Gardner	Great Britain						1.55	
9	Anne Iversen	Denmark						1.50	
9	Simone Ruas	France						1.50	
11	Carmen Phipps	Jamaica						1.50	
11	Bernice Robinson	United States						1.50	
11	Shirley Gordon	Canada						1.50	
14	Anne-Marie Colchen	France						1.40	
14	Emma Reed	United States						1.40	
14	Triny Bourkel	Luxembourg						1.40	
17	Elizabeth Müller	Brazil						1.40	
17	Olga Gyarmati	Hungary						1.40	
19	Elaine Silburn	Canada						1.40	
	Noemí Simonetto de Portela	Argentina						DNS	
	Milly Ludwig	Luxembourg						DNS	
	Fanny Blankers-Koen	Netherlands						DNS	

Key: OR = Olympic record

== Sources ==
- Organising Committee for the XIV Olympiad, The (1948). The Official Report of the Organising Committee for the XIV Olympiad (PDF). LA84 Foundation. Archived from the original (PDF) on September 27, 2013.
