= Karelse =

Karelse is a Dutch or Afrikaans surname. Notable people with the surname include:

- John Karelse (born 1970), Dutch footballer and manager
- Neeltje Karelse (1926–2015), Dutch track-and-field athlete
- Tyrese Karelse (born 2001), South African cricketer
