= Bergendorff =

Bergendorff is a surname of Scandinavian origin. Notable people with the surname include:

- Bente Bergendorff (1929–1967), Danish sprinter
- Zhana Bergendorff (born 1985), Bulgarian singer and songwriter
