= Shirley Gordon =

Shirley Gordon may refer to:

- Shirley Gordon (writer) (1921-2008), American writer of radio programs, television shows, and children's books
- Shirley Gordon Olafsson (1927–2019), Canadian Olympic athlete
