= Judy Canty =

Judy Canty is the name of

- Judy Canty (long jumper) (1931–2016), Australian long jumper
- Judy Peckham (née Canty; born 1950), Australian sprinter and middle-distance runner
