= Millie Cheater =

Canadian olympic sprinter

Personal information
- Born: 20 November 1927 Winnipeg, Manitoba, Canada
- Died: 20 January 2003 (aged 75) North Vancouver, British Columbia, Canada

Sport
- Sport: Sprinting
- Event: 100 metres

Millie Cheater (20 November 1927 – 20 January 2003) was a Canadian sprinter. She competed in the women's 100 metres at the 1948 Summer Olympics, along with the women's 200 metres, and women's 4 × 100 metres relay.
