= Tamás Aczél =

Hungarian poet, writer and journalist (born 1921)

- Born: 16 December 1921; Budapest, Kingdom of Hungary
- Died: 18 April 1994 (aged 72); Boston, Massachusetts, United States
- Occupations: Poet; writer; journalist; translator; university professor
- Spouses: Éva Aczél (née Kádár); Olga Gyarmati
- Children: 2
- Relatives: Pál Aczél
- Writing career
- Language: Hungarian; English
- Notable awards: Kossuth Prize, 1949; State Stalin Prize, 1952

Academic background
- Education: Pázmány Péter Catholic University

Tamás Aczél (Hungarian: [ˈtɒmaːʃ ˈɒt͡seːl]; 1921–1994) was a Hungarian poet, writer, journalist, translator and university professor.

== Early life and education ==
Tamás Aczél was born in Budapest, Kingdom of Hungary (present-day, Hungary) on 16 December 1921 to a Hungarian-Jewish family. Pál Aczél was Aczél's uncle.

Aczél graduated in his hometown in 1939, and subsequently he went to Italy to study commerce and catering (1939–1941). After returning to Hungary, Aczél enrolled at the Pázmány Péter Catholic University and earned academic degree in Hungarian and English.

== Career ==
Aczél's first poems were published in 1941. In 1945, Aczél joined the Hungarian Communist Party, and was active member of the Hungarian Writers' Union.

During World War II Aczél was deported to Mauthausen concentration camp.

Aczél was initially favoured by the post-war Hungarian government, he wrote agitational poems and schematic novels, for which he was awarded the Kossuth Prize (1949) and the Stalin Prize (1952).

By 1953 Aczél radically broke with his earlier works; he gave up his agitative poetry and became a leading figure of the literary opposition formed around Imre Nagy, that initiated the dismissal of the Stalinist-Rákosist literary control.

Aczél was one of the co-founders of the Petőfi Circle, and by 1956 his name appeared on Mátyás Rákosi's list of intellectuals to be arrested for anti party agitation. After the Hungarian Revolution of 1956 was repressed, Aczél fled the country and emigrated to England (1957–1966), before eventually settling in the United States (1966–1994). He became one of the best-known figures of the Hungarians emigrants and did a lot to make the story of the Hungarian Revolution better known.

=== United States ===
In the United States he was a professor at the University of Massachusetts Amherst until his death. Aczél lived in Greenfield, Massachusetts.

== Personal life ==
Aczél was first married to Éva Aczél (née Kádár; 1922–1998). The couple had one daughter before later divorcing.

In England Aczél met and married Olga Gyarmati (1924–2013), a Hungarian track and field athlete. The couple had one son.

== Works published in English ==
- Aczél, Tamás; Méray, Tibor (1959). The Revolt of the Mind: A Case History of Intellectual Resistance behind the Iron Curtain. No.73 Praeger Publications in Russian History and World Communism. New York: Frederick A. Praeger, Inc.
- The Ice Age. A Novel. (New York, 1965)
- Ten Years After. A Commemoration of the Tenth Anniversary of the Hungarian Revolution. (London, 1966)
- Langland, Joseph; Aczél, Tamás; Tikos, Laszlo, eds. (1973). Poetry from the Russian underground : a bilingual anthology (1 ed.). New York: Harper & Row. ISBN 0-06-012501-2.
- Illuminations. Novel. (Pantheon Books. London, 1982)
- The Hunt. Novel. (London, 1990)
