= Ted Haggis =

Canadian sprinter (1924–2017)

Edward Hopwood Haggis (9 June 1924 – 23 January 2017) was a Canadian sprinter, born in London, Ontario, who competed in the 1948 Summer Olympics. He is the father of Paul Haggis.

== Personal life ==
Haggis served in the Royal Canadian Navy during the Second World War and participated in the Invasion of Normandy.

== Competition record ==
Year	Competition	Venue	Position	Event	Notes
Representing Canada
1948	Olympics	London, England	5th, QF 1	100 m	
1948	Olympics	London, England	5th, QF 4	200 m	
