= Earl Audet =

American football player (1921–2002)

- Audet in 1946

No. 27, 42, 98
- Position: Tackle

Personal information
- Born: May 14, 1921; Providence, Rhode Island, U.S.
- Died: December 18, 2002 (aged 81); Los Angeles, California, U.S.
- Listed height: 6 ft 2 in (1.88 m)
- Listed weight: 252 lb (114 kg)

Career information
- College: Georgetown; USC
- NFL draft: 1944: 3rd round, 23rd overall pick

Career history
- Washington Redskins (1945); Los Angeles Dons (1946–1948); Calgary Stampeders (1950)

Career NFL/AAFC statistics
- Games played: 51
- Games started: 25
- Stats at Pro Football Reference

Earle Toussaint Audet (May 14, 1921 – December 18, 2002) was an American football offensive tackle in the National Football League (NFL) for the Washington Redskins, as well as the Los Angeles Dons of the All-America Football Conference (AAFC). He played college football at the University of Southern California, where he joined Theta Chi fraternity, and was drafted in the third round of the 1944 NFL draft.

As an actor, he played minor roles in Tahiti Honey (1943), Black Bart (1948) and All American (1953).

His wife DeDe, a graduate of Venice High School and longtime community activist and volunteer, served on Venice Town Council in the 1960s and 1970s, as President of Venice Neighborhood Council after Earl's death before retiring in 2017 to move to Culver City.

Audet was also an accomplished shot putter, winning the 1943 and 1944 USA Outdoor Track and Field Championships in that event.

== Early life and education ==
Audet was a member of the Marines during World War II.

Audet (top right) on the program for a November 2, 1947 game with the rival San Francisco 49ers.
