= Bob McFarlane (Canadian athlete) =

Canadian athlete (1927–2006)

- Born: May 28, 1927; London, Ontario, Canada
- Died: February 27, 2006 (aged 78)
- Education: University of Western Ontario
- Occupations: athlete, surgeon

Robert Malcolm McFarlane (May 28, 1927 – February 27, 2006) was a Canadian track and field sprinter and football player who became a plastic surgeon specializing primarily in hand and upper limb surgery.

== Athletic Involvement ==
Born in London, Ontario, McFarlane attended the University of Western Ontario from 1946 to 1951 as a medical student. While at Western, McFarlane was awarded the John Davies Trophy as Canada's top track athlete of 1947, and he carried the flag for Canada at the 1948 Summer Olympics, at which he competed in the 400-meter dash and relay. His brother Don McFarlane was also on the relay team with him. At the same time, McFarlane led the Western Ontario Mustangs football team that won the Yates Cup in 1946, 1947, 1949, and 1950.

His most impressive year as an athlete was 1950, when he set five Canadian track records, defeated Olympic champions Mal Whitfield and Arthur Wint, and was the leading scorer among all Canadian university football teams. For those achievements, he was voted the Lou Marsh Trophy winner as Canada's top athlete of 1950 and the winner of the Norton Crowe Memorial Medal as Canada's top amateur athlete. He again received the John Davies Trophy as the country's top track athlete. McFarlane was named Western's athlete of the century in 1978, and was inducted into the London Sports Hall of Fame in 2006.

== Medical career ==
After graduating in 1951, McFarlane went on to become a plastic surgeon and head of plastic surgery at Victoria Hospital in London, Ontario. He moved to St. Joseph's Hospital in London in 1992, where he founded the Hand and Upper Limb Centre, which is now recognized as Canada's best upper extremity surgery unit. In 2004, the Canadian Society of Plastic Surgeons awarded him a lifetime achievement award. McFarlane died in 2006 at age 78. A full obituary can be read at the website of the Hand and Upper Limb Centre.

== Competition record ==
Year	Competition	Venue	Position	Event	Notes
Representing Canada
1948	Olympics	London, United Kingdom	6th, Heat 2, SF	400 m	51.7
