= Üner Teoman =

Turkish sprinter (1932–2024)

Personal information
- Nationality: Turkish
- Born: 10 October 1932
- Died: 7 October 2024 (aged 91) Istanbul, Turkey

Sport
- Sport: Sprinting
- Event: 100 metres

Üner Teoman (10 October 1932 – 7 October 2024) was a Turkish sprinter. She competed in the women's 100 metres at the 1948 Summer Olympics. Teoman died in Istanbul on 7 October 2024, at the age of 91.
