= James O'Brien (sprinter) =

Canadian sprinter (1925–1988)

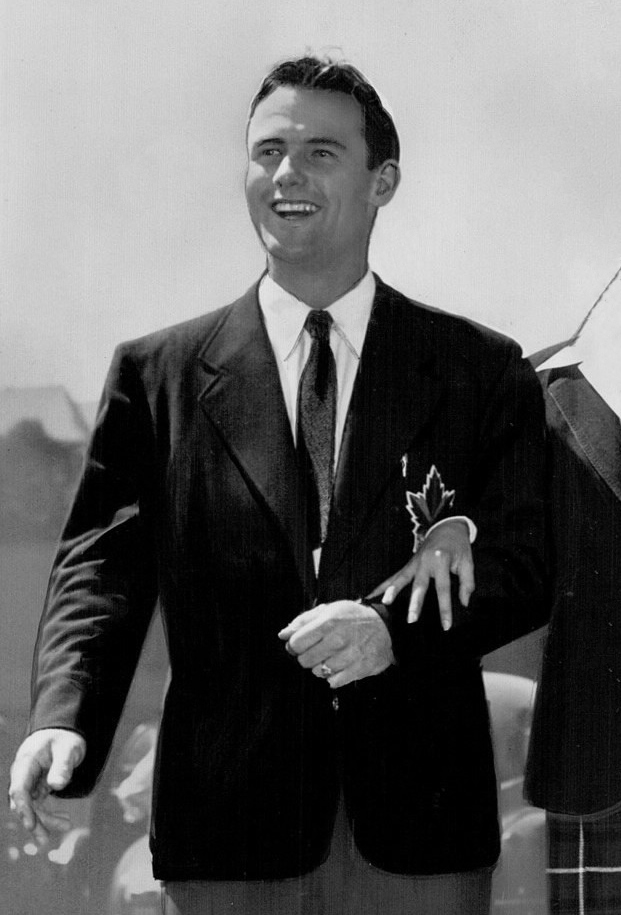
- O'Brien in 1948

Personal information
- Full name: James Vincent O'Brien
- Born: 24 July 1925 Toronto, Ontario, Canada
- Died: 27 May 1988 (aged 62)
- Height: 173 cm (5 ft 8 in)
- Weight: 68 kg (150 lb)

Sport
- Sport: Athletics
- Event: 100 m
- Club: Toronto West End YMCA

Achievements and titles
- Personal best: 100 m – 10.6 (1948)

James Vincent O'Brien (24 July 1925 – 27 May 1988) was a Canadian sprinter. He competed in the 100 m and 4 × 100 m events at the 1948 Summer Olympics and finished fifth in the relay. Besides athletics O'Brien played hockey and Canadian football. He retired from competitions a few years after the 1948 Olympics.

== Competition record ==
Year	Competition	Venue	Position	Event	Notes
Representing Canada
1948	Olympics	London, England	3rd, Heat 2	100 m	10.9
