= Triny Bourkel =

Luxembourgish athlete (1927–2019)

Personal information
- Nationality: Luxembourgish
- Born: 16 April 1927 Luxembourg City, Luxembourg
- Died: 21 February 2019 (aged 91)

Sport
- Sport: Athletics
- Event: High jump

Triny Bourkel (16 April 1927 – 21 February 2019) was a Luxembourgish athlete. She competed in the women's high jump at the 1948 Summer Olympics. She died on 21 February 2019, aged 91.
