= Marguerite Martel =

French long jumper (1924–2023)

Personal information
- Nationality: French
- Born: 19 July 1924 Confolens, France
- Died: 1 March 2023 (aged 98) Saint-Georges-de-Didonne, France

Sport
- Sport: Athletics
- Event: Long jump

Marguerite Martel (19 July 1924 – 1 March 2023) was a French athlete. She competed in the women's long jump at the 1948 Summer Olympics. Martel died in Saint-Georges-de-Didonne on 1 March 2023, at the age of 98.
