= Don McFarlane (athlete, born 1926) =

Canadian athlete

Personal information
- Born: 18 May 1926 London, Ontario, Canada
- Died: 5 March 2008 (aged 81) London, Ontario, Canada

Sport
- Sport: Sprinting
- Event: 400 metres

Don McFarlane (18 May 1926 – 5 March 2008) was a Canadian sprinter and football player. He competed in the men's 400 metres at the 1948 Summer Olympics and played football for the University of Western Ontario. He is the brother of Bob McFarlane.
