= Eric Jubb =

Canadian swimmer (born 1931)

Personal information
- Born: 17 January 1931 Toronto, Ontario, Canada

Sport
- Sport: Swimming

Eric MacGregor Jubb (born 17 January 1931), later known as Eric Lamont, is a Canadian former backstroke and freestyle swimmer. He competed in three events at the 1948 Summer Olympics.
