= Judy Canty (long jumper) =

Australian long jumper

Personal information
- Nationality: Australian
- Born: 5 October 1931 Sydney
- Died: 9 July 2016 (aged 84) Canberra, Australian Capital Territory

Sport
- Sport: Track & Field
- Event: Long Jump

Judy Canty (5 October 1931 – 9 July 2016) was an Australian athlete who competed in the 1948 Summer Olympics in the Long Jump, aged just 16 she finished 7th.
