= Olga Gyarmati =

Hungarian track and field athlete

Personal information
- Nationality: Hungarian
- Citizenship: Hungarian, British
- Born: 5 October 1924 Debrecen, Hungary
- Died: 27 October 2013 (aged 89) Greenfield, Massachusetts, United States
- Height: 1.66 m (5 ft 5 in)
- Weight: 57 kg (126 lb)
- Spouses: István Várkonyi; Tamás Aczél

Sport
- Country: Hungary
- Sport: Athletics
- Club: Debreceni TE (1941–44); Vasas SC (1947–1956)

Achievements and titles
- Personal bests: 60 m – 7.8 sec (1950); 80 m hurdles – 11.1 sec (1953); 100 m – 11.9 sec (1951); 200 m – 24.8 sec (1951); High jump – 160 cm (1950); Long jump – 623 cm (1953); Shot put – 11.12 m (1952); Women's pentathlon – 4160 pts (1955)
Medal record
Representing Hungary
Women's athletics
Olympic Games
Gold medal – first place	1948 London	Long jump
- Updated on 24 September 2014

Olga Gyarmati (Hungarian pronunciation: [ˈolɡɒ ˈɟɒrmɒti]; 5 October 1924 – 27 October 2013) was a Hungarian all-round track and field athlete who competed at three Olympic Games in four different events. Her greatest success was winning the inaugural Olympic Women's Long Jump competition in London in 1948. Additionally, she won two Universiade gold medals and a number of Hungarian Athletics Championships titles in sprint and jumping events.

== Career ==
Gyarmati was born in Debrecen and began athletics in local club Debreceni TE. She won her first Hungarian Athletics Championships title in 1941, at the age of 17, in the 100-metre dash. Shortly after, in the final years of World War II, athletics suffered a setback in Hungary as virtually no competitive events were held in the country; in this period Gyarmati moved to Budapest and married to István Várkonyi.

Gyarmati returned to competitive sport in 1947, continuing her career in Vasas SC. Until 1956 Gyarmati won a total of 31 individual national titles in Hungary, including three in 100-metre dash (1941, 1949, 1951), two in 200 metre-dash (1951, 1952), seven in the 80-metre hurdles (1948, 1949, 1951–1955), two in the high jump (1942, 1949), eight in the long jump (1948, 1949, 1951–56), and two in the pentathlon (1950, 1955). In addition, she won three team titles, one each in the high jump, long jump, and shot put.

Gyarmati earned her biggest success at the 1948 Summer Olympics, winning the gold medal in the long jump, thus becoming the second Hungarian female Olympic champion in athletics after Ibolya Csák. Gyarmati qualified for the event – the first ever Olympic long jump competition for women – with a result of 599 cm, just 26 cm short to the world record, being one of the main gold medal contenders. She eventually achieved 569.5 cm on her third attempt, setting a new Olympic record and winning the gold medal. In the high jump Gyarmati finished 17th.

In the following years Gyarmati achieved further successes at the Universiade, winning the gold medal of the long jump event in 1949 and the 200 metres in 1951. Additionally, she won another four silvers and two bronzes in these championships.

Gyarmati's next major event was the 1952 Summer Olympics in Helsinki, however, she competed with limited success. In the long jump she came tenth, while in the 200-metre dash and the 4 × 100 metres relay she was eliminated during the heats.

At the 1956 Summer Olympics Gyarmati competed only in the long jump, finishing 11th. The Games, however, were overshadowed by the Hungarian Revolution of 1956 and the subsequent Soviet invasion of Hungary, that led to many of the Hungarian Olympic Team members to defect and not to return to Hungary. Gyarmati was among the defectors as well; she emigrated to England and became a British citizen. While in England, Gyarmati married to Hungarian writer Tamás Aczél, a fellow Hungarian emigrant. Later they settled in the United States.

Gyarmati lived her final years as a recluse; she did not keep the touch with the Hungarian Olympic Committee and she did not even demand the annuity given for Olympic champions. She died on 27 October 2013 in Greenfield, Massachusetts.

== Olympic results ==
1948 Summer Olympics, London:

- Long Jump: Gold medal, 5.695 m (Olympic Record)
- High Jump: tied-17th, 1.40 m

1952 Summer Olympics, Helsinki:

- Long Jump: 10th, 5.67 m
- 200 m: 5th in 3rd heat round 1, 25.5 (did not qualify for next round)
- 4 × 100 m relay: Hungarian team disqualified in heat

1956 Summer Olympics, Melbourne:

- Long Jump: 11th, 5.66 m
