= Ernie McCullough =

Canadian sprinter

Personal information
- Born: 3 December 1925 Calgary, Alberta, Canada
- Died: 21 July 2015 (aged 89) Calgary, Alberta, Canada

Sport
- Sport: Sprinting
- Event: 400 metres

Ernie McCullough (3 December 1925 – 21 July 2015) was a Canadian sprinter. He competed in the men's 400 metres at the 1948 Summer Olympics.
