= Lance Pugh =

Canadian cyclist

Personal information
- Born: 18 April 1919 Oshawa, Ontario, Canada
- Died: 26 December 1999 (aged 80) Toronto, Ontario, Canada

Cycling career
- Sport: Cycling

Lance I. Pugh (18 April 1919 – 26 December 1999) was a Canadian cyclist. He competed in three events at the 1948 Summer Olympics.
