= Nancy Mackay =

Canadian sprinter (1922–2024)

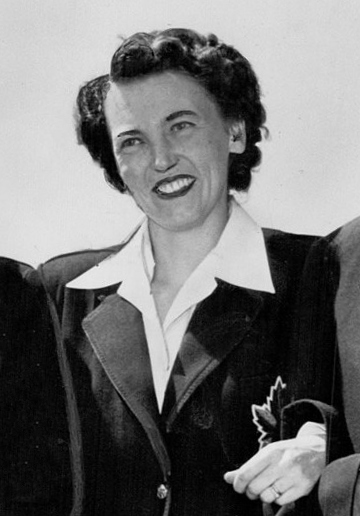
- Mackay in 1948

Personal information
- Born: 16 May 1922 Smethwick, West Midlands, England
- Died: 4 January 2024 (aged 101) Bowmanville, Ontario, Canada

Sport
- Sport: Athletics
- Event: 100 m
- Club: Malvernette Athletic Club, Toronto

Achievements and titles
- Personal best: 100 m – 12.6 (1948)
Medal record
Representing Canada
Olympic Games
Bronze medal – third place	1948 London	4×100 m relay

Nancy Mackay (née Murrall, 16 May 1922 – 4 January 2024) was a Canadian sprinter. Mackay won a bronze medal in the 4 × 100 m relay at the 1948 Summer Olympics.

Mackay was born in England, and moved to Canada when she was four years old. In the 1930s she started training in athletics and won six national titles between 1936 and 1941. She missed the 1940 Olympics due to World War II, and was selected as a reserve for the 1948 Games. She was asked to replace Millie Cheater shortly before the 4 × 100 m race. Rarning a bronze medal, she ran the fastest leg of the Canadian team which included team mates Diane Foster, Viola Myers and Patricia Jones. The same year Mackay retired from competitions. Mackay was inducted into the Oshawa Sports Hall of Fame in 1986 and into the Athletics Ontario Hall of Fame in 2011.

Mackey died at home in Bowmanville, Ontario on 4 January 2024, at the age of 101. She was predeceased by her husband of 45 years in 1987. She had a son and daughter, two grandsons and great-grandchildren. At the time of her death, she was the oldest Canadian Summer Olympic medalist, a status passed onto then 95-year-old Tom Gayford.
