= Donna Gilmore =

Canadian sprinter (born 1929)

Personal information
- Nationality: Canadian
- Born: 20 August 1929 (age 96) Vancouver, British Columbia, Canada

Sport
- Sport: Sprinting
- Event: 200 metres

Donna Gilmore (born 20 August 1929) is a former Canadian sprinter. She competed in the women's 200 metres at the 1948 Summer Olympics.
