= Grete Jenny =

Austrian sprinter

Personal information
- Nationality: Austrian
- Born: 27 February 1930 Kapfenberg, Republic of Austria
- Died: 15 November 2015 (aged 85) Bruck an der Mur, Austria

Sport
- Sport: Sprinting
- Event: 4 × 100 metres relay

Grete Jenny (27 February 1930 – 15 November 2015) was an Austrian sprinter. She competed in the women's 4 × 100 metres relay at the 1948 Summer Olympics.
