= Doug Gibson (swimmer) =

Canadian swimmer

Personal information
- Nationality: Canadian
- Born: 18 November 1929
- Died: 3 November 1993 (aged 63) Toronto, Ontario, Canada

Sport
- Sport: Swimming

F. Douglas Gibson (18 November 1929 – 3 November 1993) was a Canadian freestyle swimmer. He competed in three events at the 1948 Summer Olympics.
