= Joyce Court =

Canadian swimmer (born 1931)

Personal information
- Born: June 12, 1931

Sport
- Sport: Swimming

Joyce Carolyn Court (born June 12, 1931) is a Canadian former backstroke and freestyle swimmer. She competed in two events at the 1948 Summer Olympics.
