= Audrey Williamson =

British sprinter

Personal information
- Nationality: British (English)
- Born: 28 September 1926 Bournemouth, England
- Died: 29 April 2010 (aged 83) Rhos-on-Sea, Wales

Sport
- Sport: Athletics
- Event: Sprinting
- Club: St. Gregory's LAC
Medal record
Women's athletics
Representing Great Britain
Silver medal – second place	1948 London	200 metres

Audrey Doreen Swayne Williamson (later Mitchell) (28 September 1926 – 29 April 2010) was a British athlete who competed mainly in the 200 metres and competed at the 1948 Summer Olympics.

== Biography ==
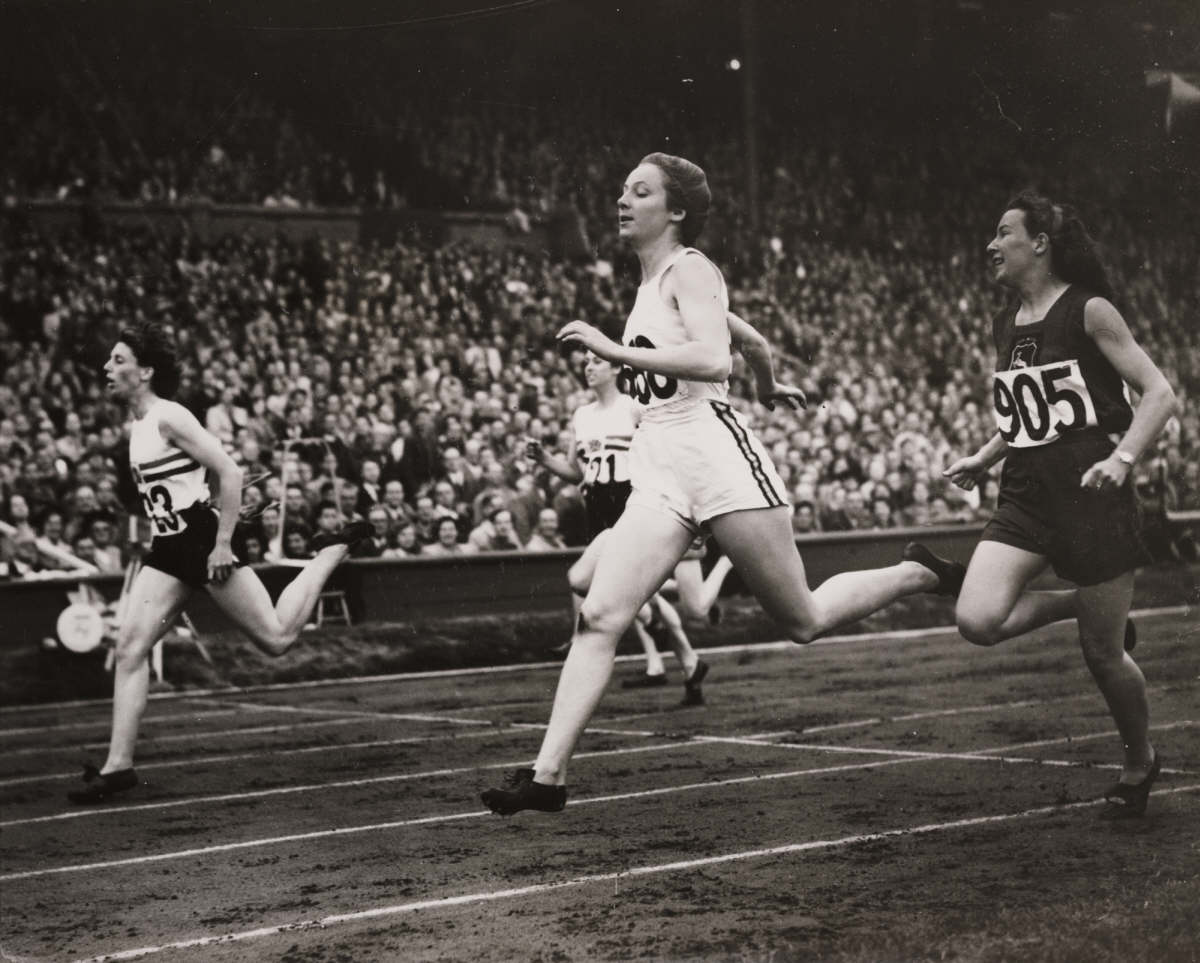
The first dead heat of the Olympic meeting of 1948 occurred in the women’s 200 metres semi final when Shirley Strickland of Australia tied for first place with Audrey Williamson. Daphne Robb of South Africa was placed third.

Williamson finished third behind Sylvia Cheeseman in the 200 metres event at the 1948 WAAA Championships.

Shortly afterwards, she competed for Great Britain at the 1948 Olympics Games, held in London, where she won the silver medal in the 200 metres. Her silver medal in the 200 metres at the Olympics remains the best performance for a British female athlete.
