= Laurent Tessier =

Canadian cyclist

Personal information
- Born: 15 September 1927 Montreal, Quebec, Canada
- Died: 5 February 2012 (aged 84)

Cycling career
- Sport: Cycling

Laurent Tessier (15 September 1927 – 5 February 2012) was a Canadian cyclist. He competed in three events at the 1948 Summer Olympics.
