= Anna Maria Cantù =

Italian sprinter

Personal information
- Nationality: Italian
- Born: 13 January 1923
- Died: 23 July 2008 (aged 85)

Sport
- Sport: Sport of athletics
- Event: Sprinting

Anna Maria Cantù (13 January 1923 – 23 July 2008) was an Italian sprinter. She competed in the women's 4 × 100 metres relay at the 1948 Summer Olympics.
