= Marian Barone =

American gymnast (1924–1996)

Olympic medal record

Women's gymnastics

Representing the United States
Bronze medal – third place	1948 London	Team

Marian Emma Barone (March 18, 1924 – May 14, 1996) was an American athlete who competed in gymnastics at the 1948 Summer Olympics and in the 1952 Summer Olympics.

Barone was also an accomplished track and field athlete. Under the name Marian Twining, she won national titles in the now-defunct basketball throw event at the 1941, 1945, 1946, and 1951 USA Indoor Track and Field Championships as well as three outdoor titles. She also placed 3rd at the 1947 USA Outdoor Track and Field Championships in the javelin throw.

Barone was born Marian Emma Twining in Philadelphia, Pennsylvania on March 18, 1924. She died in Richmond, Virginia on May 14, 1996, at the age of 72.
