= Cliff Salmond =

Canadian middle-distance runner

Personal information
- Nationality: Canadian
- Born: 27 December 1927 Victoria, British Columbia, Canada
- Died: 25 December 2013 (aged 85)

Sport
- Sport: Middle-distance running
- Event: 1500 metres

Cliff Salmond (27 December 1927 – 25 December 2013) was a Canadian middle-distance runner. He competed in the men's 1500 metres at the 1948 Summer Olympics.
