= Marcella Jeandeau =

Italian sprinter

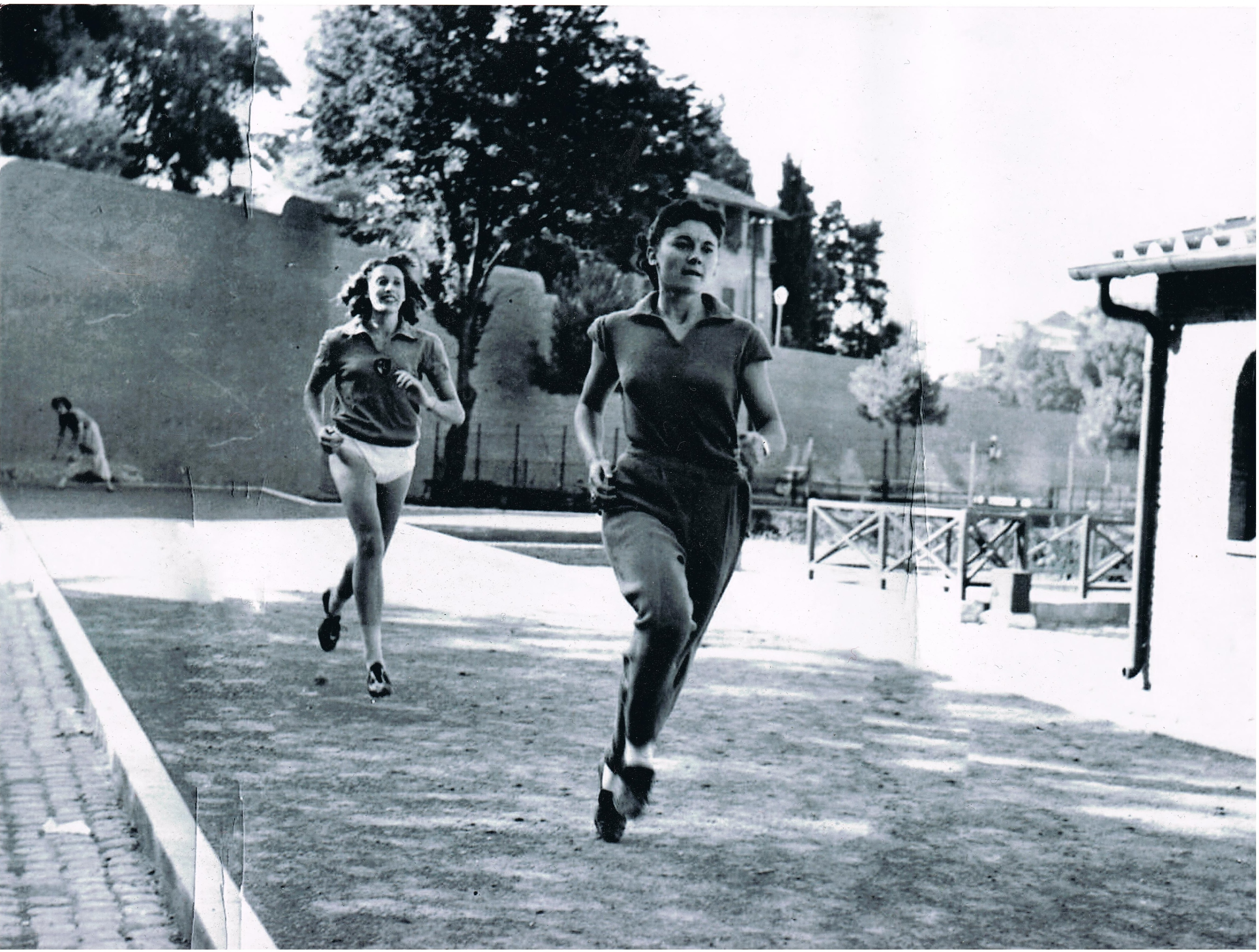

Personal information
- Nationality: Italian
- Born: 26 June 1928 Naples, Italy
- Died: 13 November 2018 (aged 90)

Sport
- Sport: Athletics
- Event: 100 m

Marcella Jeandeau (26 June 1928 – 13 November 2018) was an Italian sprinter. She competed in the women's 4 × 100 metres relay at the 1948 Summer Olympics.
