= Emma Reed =

American long jumper

Personal information
- Born: May 30, 1925 Redwood, Mississippi, United States
- Died: April 4, 2014 (aged 88) Seattle, Washington, United States

Sport
- Sport: Athletics
- Events: Long jump High jump

Emma Reed (May 30, 1925 – April 4, 2014) was an American athlete. She competed in the women's long jump and the women's high jump at the 1948 Summer Olympics.
