= Marie-Thérèse Renard =

Belgian sprinter (1925–2011)

Personal information
- Nationality: Belgian
- Born: 8 March 1925 Ghent, Belgium
- Died: 2 December 2011 (aged 86) Blankenberge, Belgium

Sport
- Sport: Sprinting
- Event: 100 metres

Marie-Thérèse Renard (8 March 1925 – 2 December 2011) was a Belgian sprinter. She competed in the women's 100 metres at the 1948 Summer Olympics. Renard died in Blankenberge, Belgium on 2 December 2011, at the age of 86.
