= Mirella Avalle =

Italian sprinter (1922–2012)

Personal information
- Nationality: Italian
- Born: 27 May 1922 Cremona, Italy
- Died: 5 September 2012 (aged 90) Villanuova sul Clisi, Italy

Sport
- Sport: Sprinting
- Event: 4 × 100 metres relay

Mirella Avalle (27 May 1922 – 5 September 2012) was an Italian sprinter. She competed in the women's 4 × 100 metres relay at the 1948 Summer Olympics.

Avalle died in Villanuova sul Clisi on 5 September 2012, at the age of 90.
