= Grethe Lovsø Nielsen =

Danish sprinter

Personal information
- Nationality: Danish
- Born: 10 March 1926 Copenhagen, Denmark
- Died: 9 March 2017 (aged 90) Aalborg, Denmark

Sport
- Sport: Sprinting
- Event: 100 metres

Grethe Lovsø Nielsen (10 March 1926 – 9 March 2017) was a Danish sprinter. She competed in the women's 100 metres at the 1948 Summer Olympics.
