= Rhoda Martin =

Canadian fencer (1919–1998)

Personal information
- Born: August 31, 1919 Montreal, Quebec, Canada
- Died: July 3, 1998 (aged 78) Sarasota, Florida, U.S.

Sport
- Sport: Fencing

Rhoda Evelyn Martin (August 31, 1919 – July 3, 1998) was a Canadian fencer. She competed in the women's individual foil event at the 1948 Summer Olympics.
