= Birthe Nielsen =

Danish sprinter

Personal information
- Nationality: Danish
- Born: 24 October 1926 Copenhagen, Denmark
- Died: 4 December 2010 (aged 84) Himmelev, Denmark

Sport
- Sport: Sprinting
- Event: 100 metres

Birthe Nielsen (24 October 1926 – 4 December 2010) was a Danish sprinter. She competed in the women's 100 metres at the 1948 Summer Olympics.
