= June Maston =

Australian runner and athletics coach (1928–2004)

Personal information
- Full name: June Elaine Rita Ferguson
- Born: June Elaine Rita Maston; 14 March 1928 Tweed Heads, New South Wales, Australia
- Died: 3 December 2004 (aged 76)
Medal record
Women's athletics
Representing Australia
Olympic Games
Silver medal – second place	1948 London	4x100 metre relay

June Elaine Rita Maston (later Ferguson; 14 March 1928 – 3 December 2004) was an Australian sprinter and athletics coach from New South Wales. In 1948 she placed fourth in the Australian national championships over 100 yards.

At the 1948 Summer Olympics in London she won a silver medal in 4 x 100 metres relay with teammates Shirley Strickland, Joyce King and Elizabeth McKinnon. She had earlier competed in the women's long jump event, but did not qualify for the final. At the Olympics she met her future husband, water polo player Jack Ferguson.

Later, she became an athletics coach. Her most successful charges included four-time Olympic sprint champion Betty Cuthbert and Olympic 80 metres hurdles champion Maureen Caird.

Maston had five children: Jeremy, Ian, Fiona, Megan, and Debra.
