= Ilse Steinegger =

Austrian jumper (1925–2023)

Ilse Steinegger (8 August 1925 – 19 October 2023) was an Austrian high and long jumper who competed in the 1948 Summer Olympics. She died on 19 October 2023, at the age of 98.
