= Bente Bergendorff =

Danish sprinter

Personal information
- Nationality: Danish
- Born: 10 March 1929
- Died: 25 February 1967 (aged 37)

Sport
- Sport: Sprinting
- Event: 100 metres

Bente Bergendorff (30 March 1929 – 25 February 1967) was a Danish sprinter. She competed in the women's 100 metres at the 1948 Summer Olympics.
