= Diane Foster (sprinter) =

Canadian sprinter (1928–1999)

Personal information
- Born: 3 March 1928 Vancouver, British Columbia, Canada
- Died: 4 January 1999 (aged 70) Oliver, British Columbia, Canada
Medal record
Women's athletics
Representing Canada
Bronze medal – third place	1948 London	4x100 m relay

Patricia Diane Foster (3 March 1928 – 4 January 1999) was a Canadian track and field athlete, who mainly competed in the 100 metres. Foster was born in Vancouver, British Columbia. She competed for Canada at the 1948 Summer Olympics held in London, United Kingdom, where she won the bronze medal in the women's 4 × 100 metres relay with her teammates Viola Myers, Nancy MacKay and Patricia Jones.
