= Shirley Gordon Olafsson =

Canadian high jumper (1927–2019)

Personal information
- Nationality: Canadian
- Born: 10 April 1927 Vancouver, British Columbia, Canada
- Died: 23 November 2019 (aged 92) Vancouver, British Columbia, Canada

Sport
- Sport: Athletics
- Event: High jump

Shirley Gordon Olafsson (born Shirley Gordon; 10 April 1927 – 23 November 2019) was a Canadian athlete. She competed in the women's high jump at the 1948 Summer Olympics tying for 11th place.

Gordon was born with a deformed left foot. She walked with a limp and used crutches until she was 13. Unable to compete in team sports, she taught herself the high jump. She joined a track club after a friend who was invited insisted that they admit Shirley as well. She married Herbert Olafsson, who was a member of the Canadian National Basketball team.
