= Liliane Sprécher =

French sprinter (1926–2019)

Personal information
- Nationality: French
- Born: 20 May 1926
- Died: 2 April 2019 (aged 92)
- Height: 168 cm (5 ft 6 in)

Sport
- Sport: Sprinting
- Event: 200 metres

Liliane Sprécher (20 May 1926 – 2 April 2019) was a French sprinter. She competed in the women's 200 metres at the 1948 Summer Olympics.
