= Patricia Jones (sprinter) =

Canadian sprinter (1930–2000)

Olympic medal record

Women's athletics

Representing Canada
Bronze medal – third place	1948 London	4×100 m relay

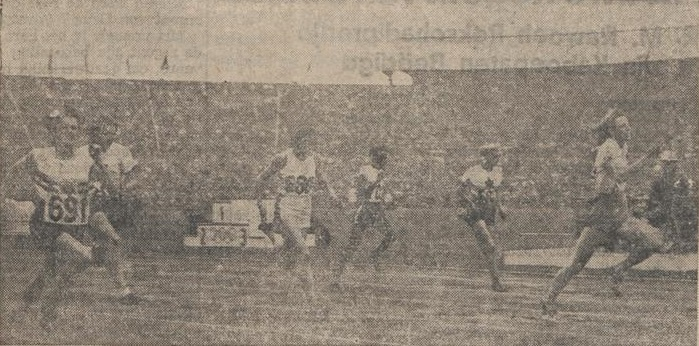
Jones in the 100m final of the 1948 Summer Olympics

Patricia Jones (16 October 1930 – 23 August 2000) was a Canadian athlete who competed mainly in the 100 metres. She was born in New Westminster. She competed for Canada in the 1948 Summer Olympics held in London, United Kingdom, in the 4 × 100 metres where she won the bronze medal with her teammates Viola Myers, Nancy MacKay and Diane Foster. Their 47.8-second time compares to the winning 47.5 seconds of the Netherlands and the 47.7 of the Australian team. In the individual 100 metres final she finished fifth, just behind Myers, both recording 12.3-second times against the winning 11.9-second run of Netherlands' Fanny Blankers-Koen.
