= William Hulse =

American middle-distance runner

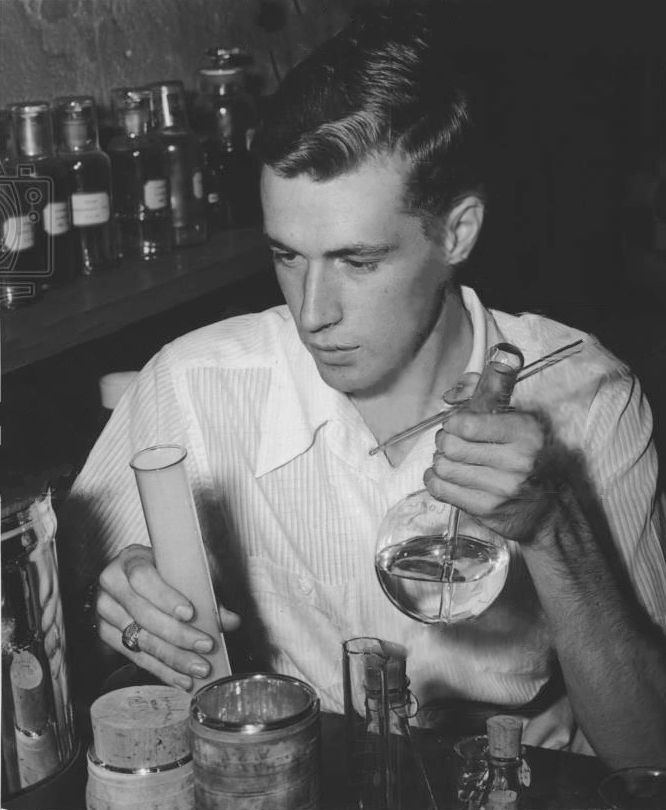
- Hulse in 1943

Personal information
- Born: December 12, 1920
- Died: February 13, 1995 (aged 74)
- Education: New York University

Sport
- Sport: Athletics
- Events: 800 m, 1500 m, mile

Achievements and titles
- Personal bests: 800 – 1.51.5 (1947); 1500 m – 3.53.8 (1947); Mile – 4.06.0 (1943)

William F. Hulse (December 12, 1920 - March 13, 1995) was an American middle-distance runner. In 1943 he set a national record in the mile, won the national cross country and 800 m titles, and placed second in the 1500 m. Next year he won the national 1500 m title and placed third in the 800 m.

Hulse was a chemist by profession, and in his early years worked on the polymerization of synthetic rubber.

Hulse competed for the NYU Violets track and field team in the NCAA.

Hulse died on March 13, 1995, at the age of 74.
