= Neeltje Karelse =

Dutch long jumper and sprinter

Personal information
- Born: 25 January 1926 Kortgene, Netherlands
- Died: 20 October 2015 (aged 89) Breda, Netherlands

Sport
- Sport: Long jump
- Club: De Zeeuwen, Vlissingen

Neeltje Jannetje "Nel" Karelse (25 January 1926 – 20 October 2015) was a Dutch track-and-field athlete. She competed at 1948 Summer Olympics in the 200 m and long jump and finished in fifth place in the latter event.
