= Joyce King =

Australian sprinter (1920–2001)

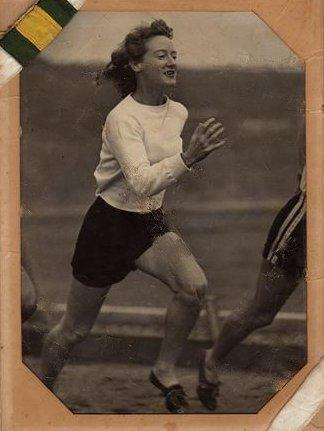
- Joyce King

Medal record

Women's athletics

Representing Australia

Olympic Games
Silver medal – second place	1948 London	4x100 m relay

Joyce A. King (1 September 1920 – 10 June 2001) was an Australian sprinter. She was born in Sydney.

In 1948, she won the Australian national championships over 100 yards and 220 yards.

At the 1948 Summer Olympics in London the same year she won a silver medal in 4 x 100 metres relay with teammates Shirley Strickland, June Maston and Elizabeth McKinnon.
