= Audrey Patterson =

Olympic medal record

Women's athletics

Representing the United States
Bronze medal – third place	1948 London	200 metres

Audrey ("Mickey") Patterson (September 27, 1926 — August 23, 1996) was the first African-American woman to win an Olympic medal; she won a bronze medal in the 200-meter dash at the 1948 Olympic Games in London.

== Biography ==
Patterson was born in New Orleans to Lionel Patterson and Josephine Nero Patterson. She attended Danneel Elementary School and Gilbert Academy, where she developed a passion for running. She earned a scholarship to Tennessee State University in Nashville and graduated from Southern University in Baton Rouge, Louisiana.

Unbeaten as a prep and college competitor, she was a star in the 100- and 200-meter races and 400-meter relay and a national and international champion in the two individual events. She won the 200-meter race at the U.S. Olympic trials in 1948, making her one of nine black American female track athletes to compete at the London Games. She was 22 when she won her Olympic medal, covering the 200 meters in 25.2 seconds, the same time as Shirley Strickland of Australia. It took officials 45 minutes to decide that Miss Patterson would get the bronze medal; Strickland was placed fourth. Fanny Blankers-Koen of the Netherlands, considered the greatest female Olympian of her time, won the race, earning her third gold medal of the 1948 games. In receiving the bronze medal, Patterson is distinguished as the United States' first African-American woman to win an Olympic medal. A few days later Alice Coachman won a gold medal at the high jump. The London games were also the first time, the 200 meter distance race was included for women competitors.

In 1965, she founded Mickey's Missiles, a track club for girls 6 to 18. Boys joined the group several years later. It grew from three members its first year to more than 125 and produced Olympic sprinters Jackie Thompson, who competed in the 200-meter race in 1972, and Dennis Mitchell, who ran in the 100-meter dash in 1988, 1992 and 1996. She managed the U.S. women's track team that toured the Soviet Union and Germany in 1969 and coached the team that competed against a Russian squad in Texas in 1974. In 1982, she founded the Martin Luther King Freedom Run in San Diego.

Patterson was named the Woman Athlete of the Year by the Amateur Athletic Union in 1949. She served as First Vice President of the Amateur Athletic Union, Director of the Pacific Southwest Association and the YMCA, Governor of the Western District of the National Association of Negro Business and Professional Women, and a member of the Urban League, NAACP and 1984 Olympic Spirit Team. She received the San Diego Woman of the Year and Press Club Headliner awards. In 1978, she was inducted into the Greater New Orleans Sports Hall of Fame. Soon after, she was inducted into the Louisiana Sports Hall of Fame at the Superdome.

She married Ronald Tyler, and settled in San Diego. She was the mother of two sons, Herbert Hunter and Gerald Hunter, and two daughters, Cynthia Lowery and Andrea Nelson. Patterson died on August 23, 1996, in National City, California.
