= Betty McKinnon =

Australian sprinter

Medal record

Women's athletics

Representing Australia

Olympic Games
Silver medal – second place	1948 London	4x100 metre relay

Elizabeth L. McKinnon (13 January 1925 – 24 June 1981) was an Australian sprinter who won a silver medal in 4 x 100 metres relay with teammates Shirley Strickland, June Maston and Joyce King at the 1948 Summer Olympics in London.
