= Alice Coachman =

American high jumper

Personal information
- Full name: Alice Coachman Davis
- Born: Alice Marie Coachman; November 9, 1923 Albany, Georgia, U.S.
- Died: July 14, 2014 (aged 90) Albany, Georgia, U.S.

Sport
- Country: United States
- Sport: Athletics
- Retired: Yes

Achievements and titles
- Highest world ranking: Yes
Medal record
Representing the United States
Olympic Games
Gold medal – first place	1948 London	High jump

Alice Marie Coachman Davis (November 9, 1923 – July 14, 2014) was an American athlete. She specialized in high jump and was the first black woman to win an Olympic gold medal.

== Biography ==
=== Early life and education ===
Alice Coachman was born on November 9, 1923, in Albany, Georgia. She was the fifth of Fred and Evelyn Coachman's ten children. Coachman was unable to access athletic training facilities or participate in organized sports because of the color of her skin. Added to the list of training barriers was her status as a female athlete during a time of widespread opposition to women in sports. She trained using what was available to her, running shoeless along the dirt roads near her home and using homemade equipment to practice her jumping.

Coachman attended Monroe Street Elementary School where she was encouraged by her 5th grade teacher, Cora Bailey, and by her aunt, Carrie Spry, despite the reservations of her parents. Upon enrolling at Madison High School in 1938, she joined the track team, working with Harry E. Lash to develop her skill as an athlete. Within a year she drew the attention of the Tuskegee Institute in Tuskegee, Alabama.

In 1939 she joined the Tuskegee Preparatory School at the age of 16 after being offered a scholarship. The scholarship required her to work while studying and training, which included cleaning and maintaining sports facilities as well as mending uniforms.

Coachman went on to graduate with a degree in dressmaking from the Tuskegee Institute in 1946. The following year she continued her studies at Albany State College, receiving a B.S. in Home Economics with a minor in science in 1949. She became a teacher and track-and-field instructor.

=== Athletic career ===
Prior to arriving at the Tuskegee Preparatory School, Coachman competed in the Amateur Athletic Union's (AAU) Women's National Championships breaking the college and National high jump records while competing barefoot. Her unusual jumping style was a combination of straight jumping and western roll techniques.

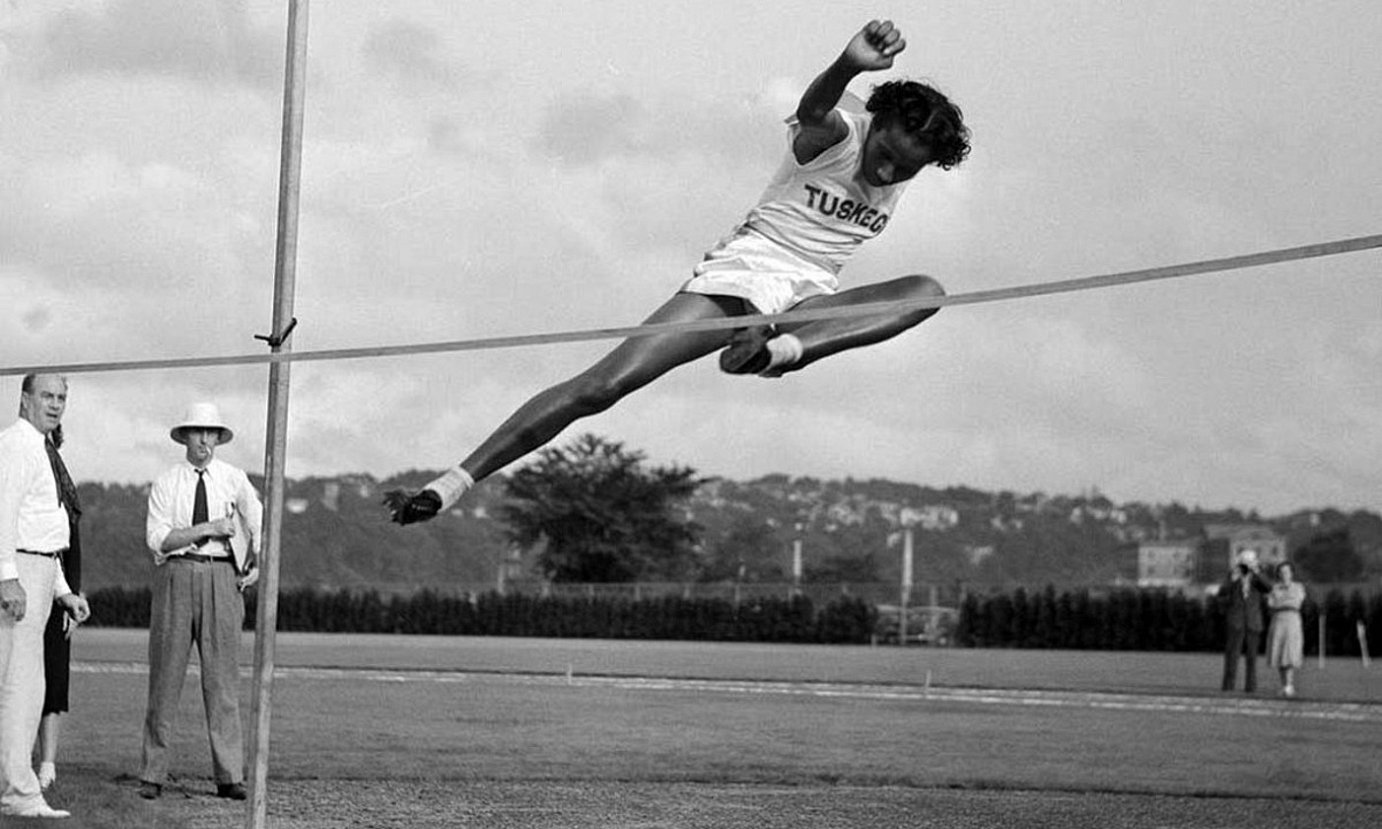
Alice Coachman high jumper at the NCAA track and field championships, 1939

Coachman dominated the AAU outdoor high jump championship from 1939 through 1948, winning ten national championships in a row. Her success earned her the nickname the "Tuskegee Flash". In addition to her high jump accomplishments, she won national championships in the 50-meter dash, the 100-meter dash and with the 400-meter relay team as a student at the Tuskegee Institute. She won 26 national championships during her nine years of competition, more than any other woman with the exception of her Polish-American rival Stella Walsh. During the same period, Coachman won three conference championships playing as a guard on the Tuskegee women's basketball team. Despite being in her prime, Coachman was unable to compete in the 1940 and 1944 Olympic Games as they were canceled because of World War II. In the opinion of sportswriter Eric Williams, "Had she competed in those canceled Olympics, we would probably be talking about her as the No. 1 female athlete of all time."

Coachman's first opportunity to compete on a global stage was during the 1948 Olympic Games in London. She qualified for the US Olympic team with a high jump of 5 feet 4 inches (1.63 m) breaking the previous 16-year-old record by 3/4 in (19 mm). In the high jump finals of the 1948 Summer Olympics, Coachman leaped 1.68 m (5 ft 6 in) on her first try. Her nearest rival, Great Britain's Dorothy Tyler, matched Coachman's jump, but only on her second try. Coachman was the only American woman to win an Olympic gold medal in athletics in 1948. Her medal was presented by King George VI.

Upon her return to the United States after the Olympics, Coachman had become a celebrity. Soon after meeting President Harry Truman and former First Lady Eleanor Roosevelt, she was honored with parades from Atlanta to Albany and was thrown a party by Count Basie. In 1952 she became the first African-American woman to endorse an international product when she was signed as a spokesperson by the Coca-Cola Company who featured her prominently on billboards alongside 1936 Olympic winner Jesse Owens. In her hometown, Alice Avenue, and Coachman Elementary School were named in her honor.

=== Media coverage ===
Even with her success, the reporting on Coachman as an athlete varied. The coverage of women compared to men was already stark in contrast, with men typically receiving full spreads with photos, while female athletes got short articles with no pictures. In 1942, she was mentioned in the Chicago Tribune in an article titled "Tuskegee Wins 6th Women's AAU Title in Track", and was reported on by the Boston Globe in an article titled "Tuskegee Girl Eclipses Stella in Title Meet". However, when the New York Times wrapped up reporting for the Olympics where she was the only American woman to win gold in track and field, the first African American to win a gold medal, and became a new Olympic record holder, they only wrote one sentence. When Coachman became a triple winner at the AAU Women's Nationals in 1945, beating Walsh, the Times only reported on Walsh's single win, ignoring Coachman's three victories. Despite this, she was praised in an interview with African-American reporter Sam Lacy by Walsh, who said Coachman was "the toughest opponent [she] had ever met" and the "finest runner [she] ever raced against".

=== Later life ===
Coachman's athletic career ended when she was 24. She dedicated the rest of her life to education and to the Job Corps.

Coachman died in Albany, Georgia on July 14, 2014, of cardiac arrest after suffering through respiratory problems. She had a stroke a few months prior for which she received treatment from a nursing home. She had two children during her first marriage to N. F. Davis, which ended in divorce. Her second husband, Frank Davis, preceded her in death.

=== Legacy ===
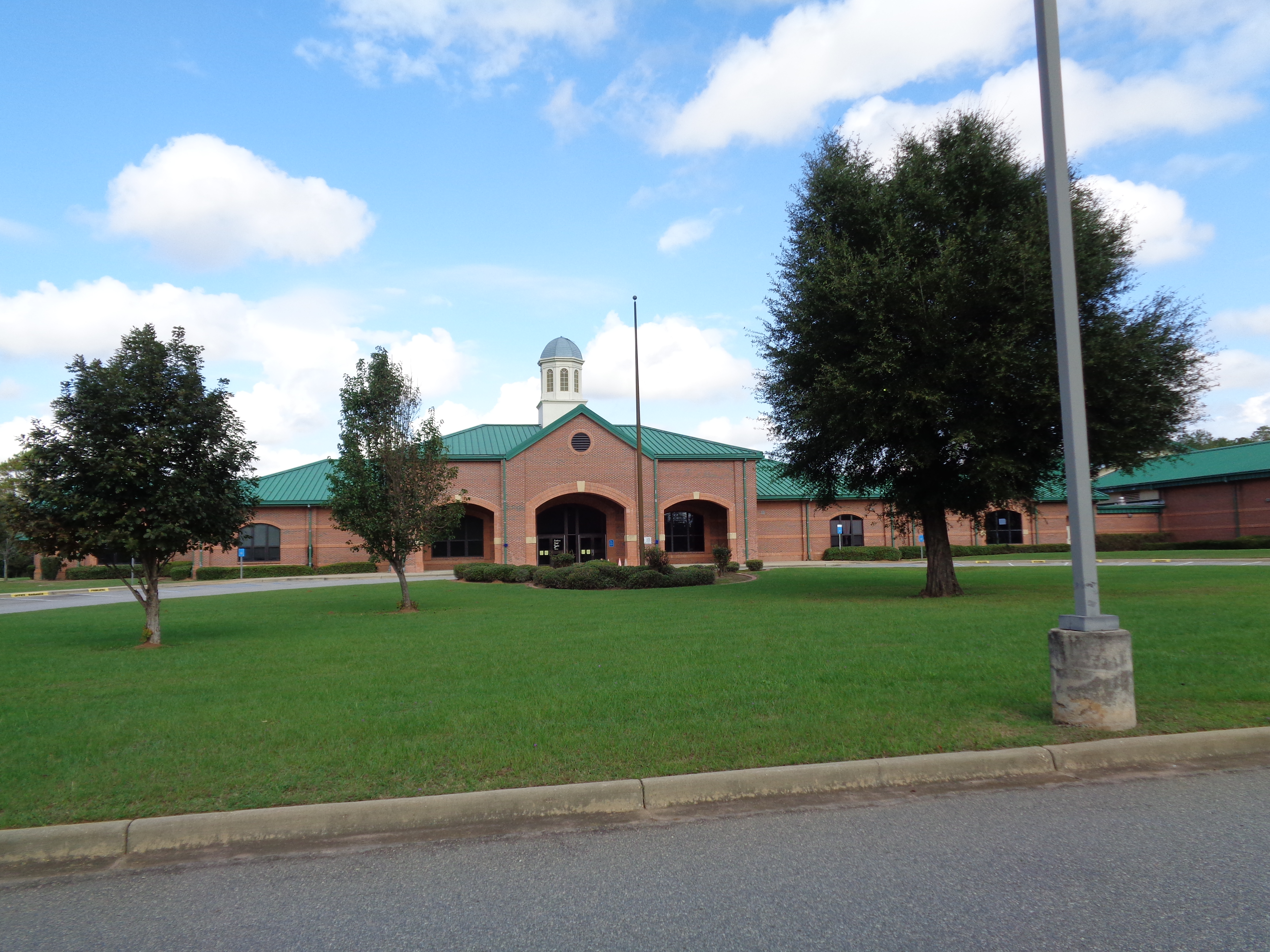
Alice Coachman Elementary School

In 1979 Coachman was inducted into the Georgia Sports Hall of Fame. During the 1996 Summer Olympic Games in Atlanta, Coachman was honored as one of the 100 greatest Olympians. She was an honorary member of Alpha Kappa Alpha sorority, inducted in 1998 In 2002, she was designated a Women's History Month Honoree by the National Women's History Project. Coachman was also inducted to the USA Track and Field Hall of fame in 1975 and the United States Olympic Hall of Fame in 2004.

Coachman has received recognition for opening the door for future African-American track stars such as Evelyn Ashford, Florence Griffith Joyner, and Jackie Joyner-Kersee. In fact, in the years since her display of Olympic prowess, black women have made up a majority of the US women's Olympic track and field team. "I think I opened the gate for all of them," she reflected. "Whether they think that or not, they should be grateful to someone in the black race who was able to do these things."
