= Viola Myers =

Canadian athlete (1927–1993)

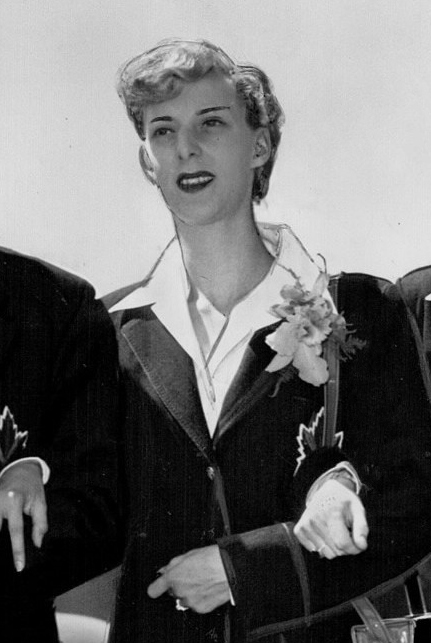
- Myers in 1948

Personal information
- Born: June 29, 1927 Toronto, Ontario, Canada
- Died: November 15, 1993 (aged 66) Toronto, Ontario, Canada

Sport
- Sport: Athletics
- Event(s): 100 m, 200 m
- Club: Malvernette Athletic Club, Toronto

Achievements and titles
- Personal best(s): 100 m – 12.2 (1948); 200 m – 25.7 (1949)
Medal record
Representing Canada
Olympic Games
| Bronze medal – third place | 1948 London | 4×100 m relay |

Viola Lillian Myers (later Richardson, June 27, 1927 – November 15, 1993) was a Canadian sprinter who competed at the 1948 Summer Olympics. She won a bronze medal in the 4 × 100 m relay and finished fourth in the individual 100 m. Myers started training in athletics in the early 1940s, and in 1944 set a national record in the 80 m sprint. She set another national record in 1948, in the 60 m, which stood until 1973. Myers retired shortly after the 1950 British Empire Games. In 2011, she was inducted into the Athletics Ontario Hall of Fame. Canadian ice hockey players Doug and Murray Wilson are her nephews. She died at a hospital in Toronto, on November 15, 1993, at the age of 66.
