= George Rhoden =

Jamaican Olympic athlete (1926–2024)

Personal information
- Full name: George Vincent Rhoden
- Born: 13 December 1926 Kingston, Jamaica
- Died: 24 August 2024 (aged 97) United States
Medal record
Men's athletics
Representing Jamaica
Olympic Games
Gold medal – first place	1952 Helsinki	400 m
Gold medal – first place	1952 Helsinki	4 × 400 m relay
Central American and Caribbean Games
Gold medal – first place	1946 Barranquilla	4 × 400 m relay
Bronze medal – third place	1946 Barranquilla	400 m
Gold medal – first place	1950 Guatemala City	800 m
Silver medal – second place	1950 Guatemala City	400 m
Silver medal – second place	1950 Guatemala City	4 × 100 m relay
Bronze medal – third place	1950 Guatemala City	4 × 400 m relay
Gold medal – first place	1954 Mexico City	4 × 100 m relay
Gold medal – first place	1954 Mexico City	4 × 400 m relay
Silver medal – second place	1954 Mexico City	400 m
Silver medal – second place	1954 Mexico City	800 m

George Vincent Rhoden (13 December 1926 – 24 August 2024) was a Jamaican athlete, winner of two Olympic gold medals in 1952.

Rhoden was born in Kingston on 13 December 1926. He later moved to San Francisco, California, and was one of the successful long sprinters from Jamaica in the late 1940s and early 1950s, along with Arthur Wint and Herb McKenley. He competed in the 1948 Summer Olympics, but did not win a medal, being eliminated in the heats of the 100 m and the semi-final of the 400 m. He was also a member of the heavily favoured Jamaican 4 × 400 m relay team, but when Wint pulled a muscle in the final, their chances at a medal were gone. On 22 August 1950 at Eskilstuna, Sweden, Rhoden set a new world record in 400 m of 45.8 s. He also won the AAU championships in 400 m from 1949 to 1951 and as a Morgan State University student, won the NCAA championships in 220 yd (200 m) in 1951 and in 440 yd (400 m) from 1950 to 1952. He was a member of Alpha Phi Alpha fraternity.

At the 1952 Summer Olympics in Helsinki, Rhoden was more successful. As a world record holder he was one of the pre-race favourites in the 400 m which he won in a close battle with his compatriot McKenley, who had also been second in the 1948 Olympic 400 m. As the anchor runner of the Jamaican relay team, Rhoden added a second Olympic gold, edging the United States where he lived by a tenth of a second, and setting a new world record (3:03.9). He died on 24 August 2024, at the age of 97.

== International competitions ==
Year	Competition	Venue	Position	Event	Notes
Representing Jamaica
1946	Central American and Caribbean Games	Barranquilla, Colombia	3rd	400 m	49.3
1946	Central American and Caribbean Games	Barranquilla, Colombia	1st	4 × 400 m relay	3:18.0
1948	Olympic Gamess	London, United Kingdom	5th (sf)	400 m	47.76
1948	Olympic Gamess	London, United Kingdom	2nd (h)	4 × 400 m relay	3:14.0^{1}
1950	Central American and Caribbean Games	Guatemala City, Guatemala	2nd	400 m	48.3
1950	Central American and Caribbean Games	Guatemala City, Guatemala	1st	800 m	1:59.4
1950	Central American and Caribbean Games	Guatemala City, Guatemala	2nd	4 × 100 m relay	41.6
1950	Central American and Caribbean Games	Guatemala City, Guatemala	3rd	4 × 400 m relay	3:19.0
1952	Olympic Games	Helsinki, Finland	1st	400 m	46.09
1952	Olympic Games	Helsinki, Finland	1st	4 × 400 m relay	3:04.04
1954	Central American and Caribbean Games	Mexico City, Mexico	2nd	400 m	48.19
1954	Central American and Caribbean Games	Mexico City, Mexico	2nd	800 m	1:55.00
1954	Central American and Caribbean Games	Mexico City, Mexico	1st	4 × 100 m relay	41.06
1954	Central American and Caribbean Games	Mexico City, Mexico	1st	4 × 400 m relay	3:12.25

^{1}Did not finish in the final
