= Athletics at the 1946 Central American and Caribbean Games =

The athletics competition in the 1946 Central American and Caribbean Games were held in Barranquilla, Colombia.

== Medal summary ==
=== Men's events ===
Event	Gold		Silver		Bronze	
100 metres	Rafael Fortún; Cuba	10.4	Herb McKenley; Jamaica	10.7	McDonald Bailey; Trinidad and Tobago	
200 metres	Rafael Fortún; Cuba	21.6	Lloyd LaBeach; Panama	21.7	Herb McKenley; Jamaica	21.7
400 metres	Arthur Wint; Jamaica	48.0	Herb McKenley; Jamaica	48.5	George Rhoden; Jamaica	49.3
800 metres	Arthur Wint; Jamaica	1:54.8	Wilfred Tull; Trinidad and Tobago	1:56.4	Ken Hyland; Trinidad and Tobago	1:57.6
1500 metres	Wilfred Tull; Trinidad and Tobago	4:07.8	Ken Hyland; Trinidad and Tobago	4:09.6	Arthur Dujon; Jamaica	4:12.4
5000 metres	Mannie Ramjohn; Trinidad and Tobago	15:54.8	Jesús Borgonio; Mexico	15:55.0	Doroteo Flores; Guatemala	15:56.0
10,000 metres	Doroteo Flores; Guatemala	33:55.0	Agustín Romero; Mexico	34:54.8	Cipriano Gómez; Mexico	34:58.2
Half marathon	Doroteo Flores; Guatemala	1:14:33	Luis Velásquez; Guatemala	1:14:39	Rafael Flores; El Salvador	1:15:38
110 metres hurdles	Eligio Barbería; Cuba	14.8	Teófilo Colón; Puerto Rico	15.5	Julio Sabater; Puerto Rico	
400 metres hurdles	Eligio Barbería; Cuba	55.3	Relín Sosa; Puerto Rico	56.4	Remigio Castro; Cuba	56.5
4 × 100 m relay	Panama; Clifford Loney; Arturo Thomas; Clayton Clarke; Lloyd LaBeach	43.0	Cuba; Rafael Fortún; Jesús Farrés; Pedro Castillo; Eligio Barbería	43.1	Trinidad and Tobago; George Lewis; Nathaniel Preddie; Albert McLean; McDonald Bailey	43.5
4 × 400 m relay	Jamaica; Herb McKenley; Clinton Woodstock; George Rhoden; Arthur Wint	3:18.0	Cuba; Juan A. Sáez; José L. Gómez; Carlos Bombalier; Ángel García	3:21.4	Panama; Eric Ferguson; David Benskin; Reginaldo Matthews; Cirilo McSween	3:23.2
High jump	Miguel Clovis; Panama	1.85	Gilberto Torres; Puerto Rico	1.85	Francisco Castro; Puerto Rico	1.85
Pole vault	José Vincente; Puerto Rico	3.98	José Barbosa; Puerto Rico	3.84	Jesús Centeno; Mexico	3.77
Long jump	Lloyd LaBeach; Panama	6.96	Lance Thompson; Jamaica	6.95	Francisco Castro; Puerto Rico	6.92
Triple jump	Francisco Castro; Puerto Rico	14.14	Harold Lawson; Jamaica	14.14	Raúl López; Cuba	13.74
Shot put	Eduardo Adriana; Netherlands Antilles	13.35	Carlos Cervantes; Cuba	13.28	Luis Betancourt; Cuba	13.03
Discus throw	Manuel Seoane; Puerto Rico	39.94	Mauricio Rodríguez; Venezuela	39.86	Carlos Pérez; Mexico	38.69
Hammer throw	Francisco González; Mexico	41.87	Luis Betancourt; Cuba	39.71	Lorenzo Barquín; Cuba	39.70
Javelin throw	Mario Salas; Cuba	55.00	Enrique Pizarro; Puerto Rico	54.18	Nicolás Romero; Puerto Rico	52.75
Pentathlon	Néstor Marchany; Puerto Rico	3374	Amador Terán; Mexico	3294	Víctor Castañeda; El Salvador	3131

=== Women's events ===
Event	Gold		Silver		Bronze	
50 metres	Dolores Worrell; Panama	6.4	Cynthia Thompson; Jamaica	6.5	Hyacinth Walters; Jamaica	6.8
100 metres	Cynthia Thompson; Jamaica	12.1	Emilia Foster; Panama	12.7	Dolores Worrell; Panama	12.7
80 metres hurdles	Josefine Lewis; Panama	12.5	Mavis Evelyn; Jamaica	12.7	Kathleen Russell; Jamaica	12.7
4 × 100 m relay	Panama; Dolores Worrell; Mildred Bannister; Esther Stewart; Emilia Foster	49.1	Jamaica; Cynthia Thompson; Cynthia Llewellyn; Hyacinth Walters; Icis Clarke	50.1	Cuba; Regla Cáceres; Georgina Iglesias; Esperanza McKenzie; Bertha Delgado	53.0
High jump	Carmen Phipps; Jamaica	1.54	Vinton Beckett; Jamaica	1.52	Silvia Ford; Panama	1.44
Discus throw	Judith Caballero; Panama	30.17	Esther Reyes; Mexico	29.73	Gloria Álvarez; Cuba	29.72
Javelin throw	Judith Caballero; Panama	38.04	Ángela Iglesias; Cuba	36.75	Alicia Reyes; Puerto Rico	33.99

== Medal table ==
Rank	Nation	Gold	Silver	Bronze	Total
1	Panama (PAN)	8	2	3	13
2	Jamaica (JAM)	5	8	5	18
3	Cuba (CUB)	5	5	6	16
4	Puerto Rico (PUR)	4	5	5	14
5	Trinidad and Tobago (TTO)	2	2	3	7
6	Guatemala (GUA)	2	1	1	4
7	Mexico (MEX)	1	4	3	8
8	Netherlands Antilles (AHO)	1	0	0	1
9	Venezuela (VEN)	0	1	0	1
10	El Salvador (ESA)	0	0	2	2
Totals (10 entries)		28	28	28	84
