= Athletics at the 1950 Central American and Caribbean Games – Results =

These are the results of the athletics competition at the 1950 Central American and Caribbean Games which took place between 28 February and 7 March 1950, at the Estadio Olímpico in Guatemala City, Guatemala.

== Men's results ==
=== 100 metres ===
Heats – 26 February

Rank	Heat	Name	Nationality	Time	Notes
1	1	Jesús Farrés	Cuba	10.3w	Q
2	1	Herb McKenley	Jamaica	NT	Q
3	1	Gilberto Torres	Puerto Rico	10.9w	Q
1	2	Rafael Fortún	Cuba	NT	Q
2	2	Mario Feusier	El Salvador	NT	Q
3	2	Virgilio Zapata	Guatemala	NT	Q
5	2	Gilberto Rondón	Puerto Rico	11.3	
1	3	Lloyd LaBeach	Panama	10.3w	Q
2	3	Leslie Laing	Jamaica	NT	Q
3	3	Javier Sarasa	Mexico	NT	Q
1	4	Aristipo Lerma	Colombia	10.3w	Q
2	4	Felipe Malcolm	Panama	NT	Q
3	4	Raúl Mazorra	Cuba	NT	Q
1	5	Kelvin Boissière	Trinidad and Tobago	NT	Q
2	5	Egbert Morell	Jamaica	NT	Q
3	5	Clayton Clark	Panama	NT	Q

Semifinals – 26 February

Rank	Heat	Name	Nationality	Time	Notes
1	1	Jesús Farrés	Cuba	10.5	Q
2	1	Leslie Laing	Jamaica	10.6	Q
3	1	Felipe Malcolm	Panama	10.6	
4	1	Gilberto Torres	Puerto Rico	10.7	
1	2	Rafael Fortún	Cuba	10.4	Q
2	2	Lloyd LaBeach	Panama	10.5	Q
4	2	Mario Feusier	El Salvador	10.7	
1	3	Herb McKenley	Jamaica	10.5	Q
2	3	Aristipo Lerma	Colombia	10.7	Q
3	3	Raúl Mazorra	Cuba	10.7	
4	3	Kelvin Boissière	Trinidad and Tobago	10.7	

Final – 27 February
Wind: +5.2 m/s

Rank	Name	Nationality	Time	Notes
1st place, gold medalist(s)	Rafael Fortún	Cuba	10.3	
2nd place, silver medalist(s)	Herb McKenley	Jamaica	10.4	
3rd place, bronze medalist(s)	Lloyd LaBeach	Panama	10.5	
4	Jesús Farrés	Cuba	10.6	
5	Leslie Laing	Jamaica	10.6	
6	Aristipo Lerma	Colombia	10.6	

=== 200 metres ===
Heats – 28 February

Rank	Heat	Name	Nationality	Time	Notes
1	1	Lloyd LaBeach	Panama	21.1w	Q
2	1	Leslie Laing	Jamaica	21.4w	Q
6	1	Oswaldo González	Puerto Rico	22.2w	
1	2	Felipe Malcolm	Panama	21.6	Q
2	2	Egbert McNeil	Jamaica	21.8	Q
4	2	Gilberto Torres	Puerto Rico	NT	
1	3	Rafael Fortún	Cuba	21.1w	Q
2	3	Herb McKenley	Jamaica	21.5w	Q
3	3	Filiberto Correa	Puerto Rico	21.9	

Final – 1 March

Rank	Name	Nationality	Time	Notes
1st place, gold medalist(s)	Herb McKenley	Jamaica	20.9w	
2nd place, silver medalist(s)	Rafael Fortún	Cuba	21.2w	
3rd place, bronze medalist(s)	Lloyd LaBeach	Panama	21.2w	
4	Leslie Laing	Jamaica	21.3	
5	Felipe Malcolm	Panama	21.6	
	Egbert McNeil	Jamaica	DNS	

=== 400 metres ===
Heats – 1 March

Rank	Heat	Name	Nationality	Time	Notes
1	1	George Rhoden	Jamaica	49.8	Q
2	1	Samuel LaBeach	Panama	50.3	Q
3	1	Amadeo Francis	Puerto Rico	51.3	
1	2	Herb McKenley	Jamaica	50.4	Q
2	2	Cirilo McSween	Panama	50.7	Q
3	2	Pedro Bocio	Puerto Rico	51.2	
1	3	Benson Ford	Jamaica	49.1	Q
2	3	Ángel García	Cuba	49.3	Q
4	3	Ismael Delgado	Puerto Rico	50.0	

Final – 2 March

Rank	Name	Nationality	Time	Notes
1st place, gold medalist(s)	Herb McKenley	Jamaica	47.8	GR
2nd place, silver medalist(s)	George Rhoden	Jamaica	48.3	
3rd place, bronze medalist(s)	Cirilo McSween	Panama	49.3	
4	Samuel LaBeach	Panama	49.?	
5	Benson Ford	Jamaica	NT	
	Ángel García	Cuba	DNF	

=== 800 metres ===
Heats – 26 February

Rank	Heat	Name	Nationality	Time	Notes
1	1	Frank Prince	Panama	NT	Q
2	1	Frank Rivera	Puerto Rico	2:00.4	Q
3	1	Evelio Planas	Cuba	NT	Q
4	1	José Márquez	Puerto Rico	2:00.5	Q
1	2	George Rhoden	Jamaica	NT	Q
2	2	Ken Hyland	Trinidad and Tobago	NT	Q
3	2	José Gómez	Cuba	NT	Q
4	2	Juan Sáez	Cuba	NT	Q
7	2	Eugenio Rojas	Puerto Rico	2:08.0	

Final – 27 February

Rank	Name	Nationality	Time	Notes
1st place, gold medalist(s)	George Rhoden	Jamaica	1:59.4	
2nd place, silver medalist(s)	Frank Prince	Panama	1:59.5	
3rd place, bronze medalist(s)	Frank Rivera	Puerto Rico	2:01.1	
4	José Márquez	Puerto Rico	2:01.7	
5	Evelio Planas	Cuba	2:01.7	
6	Juan Sáez	Cuba	2:01.8	
	Ken Hyland	Trinidad and Tobago	?	
	José Gómez	Cuba	?	

=== 1500 metres ===
Heats – 1 March

Rank	Heat	Name	Nationality	Time	Notes
1	1	Ken Hyland	Trinidad and Tobago	4:15.8	Q
2	1	Guillermo Rojas	Guatemala	NT	Q
3	1	Heriberto Román	Mexico	NT	Q
4	1	Eligio Aguilar	El Salvador	NT	Q
6	1	Raúl Delgado	Puerto Rico	4:24.0	
7	1	Héctor Pérez	Puerto Rico	NT	
1	2	Frank Prince	Panama	4:19.9	Q
2	2	Jaime Tolentino	Puerto Rico	4:20.9	Q
3	2	Luis Noriega	Guatemala	NT	Q

Final – 2 March

Rank	Name	Nationality	Time	Notes
1st place, gold medalist(s)	Frank Prince	Panama	4:13.0	
2nd place, silver medalist(s)	Ken Hyland	Trinidad and Tobago	4:14.8	
3rd place, bronze medalist(s)	Guillermo Rojas	Guatemala	4:15.0	
4	Jaime Tolentino	Puerto Rico	4:15.6	
5	Luis Noriega	Guatemala	4:18.2	
6	Heriberto Román	Mexico	4:18.3	
	Eligio Aguilar	El Salvador	NT	

=== 5000 metres ===
28 February

Rank	Name	Nationality	Time	Notes
1st place, gold medalist(s)	Francisco Hernández	Mexico	16:05.8	
2nd place, silver medalist(s)	Mateo Flores	Guatemala	16:10.6	
3rd place, bronze medalist(s)	Isidoro Reséndiz	Mexico	16:24.7	
4	Luis Velázquez	Guatemala	16:32.6	
5	Carlton Chambers	Trinidad and Tobago	16:39.8	
6	Hilario Briones	Mexico	16:45.7	

=== 10,000 metres ===
26 February

Rank	Name	Nationality	Time	Notes
1st place, gold medalist(s)	Luis Velázquez	Guatemala	34:33.6	
2nd place, silver medalist(s)	Isidoro Reséndiz	Mexico	34:50.7	
3rd place, bronze medalist(s)	Cruz Serrano	Mexico	34:52.5	
4	Hilario Briones	Mexico	NT	
5	Mateo Flores	Guatemala	NT	
6	Gustavo Ramírez	Colombia	NT	

=== Half marathon ===
3 March

Rank	Name	Nationality	Time	Notes
1st place, gold medalist(s)	Luis Velázquez	Guatemala	1:14:44	
2nd place, silver medalist(s)	Doroteo Flores	Guatemala	1:15:41	
3rd place, bronze medalist(s)	Gustavo Ramírez	Colombia	1:17:14	
4	Carlos Troncoso	Colombia	1:19:08	
5	Ortiz Zapata	Guatemala	NT	
6	Rodríguez Ríos	Mexico	NT	
7	Jesús Borgonio	Mexico	NT	

=== 110 metres hurdles ===
Heats – 28 February

Rank	Heat	Name	Nationality	Time	Notes
1	1	Julio Sabater	Puerto Rico	15.4	Q
2	1	Heriberto Fernández	Cuba	15.5	Q
1	2	Teófilo Colón	Puerto Rico	15.3	Q
2	2	Samuel Anderson	Cuba	15.4	Q
1	3	Vicente Tavárez	Mexico	15.8	Q
2	3	Remigio Castro	Cuba	16.1	Q

Final – 1 March

Rank	Name	Nationality	Time	Notes
1st place, gold medalist(s)	Julio Sabater	Puerto Rico	14.9	
2nd place, silver medalist(s)	Samuel Anderson	Cuba	15.2	
3rd place, bronze medalist(s)	Vicente Tavárez	Mexico	15.2	
4	Teófilo Colón	Puerto Rico	15.5	
5	Heriberto Hernández	Cuba	15.7	
6	Remigio Castro	Cuba	16.0	

=== 400 metres hurdles ===
Heats – 26 February

Rank	Heat	Name	Nationality	Time	Notes
1	1	Jaime Aparicio	Colombia	56.5	Q
2	1	Miguel Cabrera	Puerto Rico	58.1	Q
1	2	Samuel Anderson	Cuba	56.8	Q
2	2	Carlos Monges	Mexico	NT	Q
4	2	Joaquín Becerril	Puerto Rico	1:00.5	
1	3	Evelio Spinola	Cuba	58.6	Q
2	3	Relín Sosa	Puerto Rico	NT	Q

Final – 27 February

Rank	Name	Nationality	Time	Notes
1st place, gold medalist(s)	Jaime Aparicio	Colombia	54.9	GR
2nd place, silver medalist(s)	Relín Sosa	Puerto Rico	56.6	
3rd place, bronze medalist(s)	Carlos Monges	Mexico	57.3	
4	Samuel Anderson	Cuba	57.4	
5	Evelio Spinola	Cuba	57.9	
6	Miguel Cabrera	Puerto Rico	1:06.3	

=== 4 × 100 metres relay ===
Heats – 2 March

Rank	Heat	Nation	Competitors	Time	Notes
1	1	Jamaica		42.4	Q
2	1	Puerto Rico		42.7	Q
3	1	Mexico		42.8	Q
1	2	Panama		42.1	Q, GR
2	2	Cuba		42.9	Q
3	2	Guatemala		44.1	Q
4	?	Curaçao		NT	

Final – 2 March

Rank	Nation	Competitors	Time	Notes
1st place, gold medalist(s)	Cuba	Rafael Fortún, Jesús Farrés, Raúl Mazorra, Dioscórides Wilson	41.5	GR
2nd place, silver medalist(s)	Jamaica	George Rhoden, Lancelot Thompson, Leslie Laing, Herb McKenley	41.6	
3rd place, bronze medalist(s)	Panama	Lloyd LaBeach, Samuel LaBeach, Felipe Malcolm, Cirilo McSween	42.0	
4	Puerto Rico	Elmo Álvarez, Gilberto Torres, Filiberto Correa, Oswaldo González	42.4	
5	Mexico		42.9	
6	Guatemala		44.0	

=== 4 × 400 metres relay ===
3 March

Rank	Nation	Competitors	Time	Notes
1st place, gold medalist(s)	Panama	Samuel LaBeach, Cirilo McSween, Frank Prince, Lloyd LaBeach	3:17.2	GR
2nd place, silver medalist(s)	Cuba	Hermes Riverí, Juan Sáez, Ángel García, Evelio Planas	3:19.0	
3rd place, bronze medalist(s)	Jamaica	Benson Ford, Leslie Laing, Egbert McNeil, George Rhoden	3:19.0	
4	Puerto Rico	Pedro Bocio, Amadeo Francis, Ismael Delgado, Filiberto Correa	3:22.4	
5	Mexico	Rodríguez, Alvarado, Lead, Montoya	NT	
6	Guatemala		NT	

=== High jump ===
26 February

Rank	Name	Nationality	Result	Notes
1st place, gold medalist(s)	Gilberto Torres	Puerto Rico	1.89	GR
2nd place, silver medalist(s)	Oswald Lyon	Jamaica	1.89	=GR
3rd place, bronze medalist(s)	Benjamín Casado	Puerto Rico	1.85	
4	Roberto López	Puerto Rico	1.85	
5	Claudio Cabrera	Cuba	1.75	
6	Miguel Clovis	Panama	1.75	

=== Pole vault ===
28 February

Rank	Name	Nationality	Result	Notes
1st place, gold medalist(s)	José Vicente	Puerto Rico	4.10	GR
2nd place, silver medalist(s)	José Barbosa	Puerto Rico	3.78	
3rd place, bronze medalist(s)	José Fontánez	Puerto Rico	3.63	
4	Jesús Centeno Hernádez	Mexico	3.48	
5	Jorge Aguilera	Mexico	3.48	
6	Carlos Ávila	Colombia	3.33	

=== Long jump ===
27 February

Rank	Name	Nationality	Result	Notes
1st place, gold medalist(s)	Francisco Castro	Puerto Rico	7.01	GR
2nd place, silver medalist(s)	Benjamín Casado	Puerto Rico	6.95	
3rd place, bronze medalist(s)	Claudio Cabrejas	Cuba	6.94	
4	Lancelot Thompson	Jamaica	?	
5	Reinaldo Sálamo	Puerto Rico	6.79	
6	Alfredo Parra	Colombia	?	

=== Triple jump ===
1 March

Rank	Name	Nationality	Result	Notes
1st place, gold medalist(s)	Reinaldo Salamo	Puerto Rico	14.20	GR
2nd place, silver medalist(s)	Francisco Castro	Puerto Rico	14.10	
3rd place, bronze medalist(s)	Benjamín Casado	Puerto Rico	13.57	
4	Raúl López	Cuba	?	
5	Francisco Hung	Cuba	?	
6	Francisco Álvarez	Mexico	?	

=== Shot put ===
27 February

Rank	Name	Nationality	Result	Notes
1st place, gold medalist(s)	Israel Capavete	Puerto Rico	13.78	GR
2nd place, silver medalist(s)	Eduardo Adriana	Cuaraçao	13.67	
3rd place, bronze medalist(s)	Gerardo de Villiers	Cuba	13.23	
4	Rodolfo Sedas	Mexico	13.22	
5	Ramón Rosario	Puerto Rico	13.04	
6	Miguel Belais	Cuba	12.98	

=== Discus throw ===
28 February

Rank	Name	Nationality	Result	Notes
1st place, gold medalist(s)	Eduardo Parera	Cuba	40.54	
2nd place, silver medalist(s)	Manuel Seoane	Puerto Rico	38.88	
3rd place, bronze medalist(s)	Juan Luyanda	Puerto Rico	37.57	
4	Carlos Pérez	Mexico	37.56	
5	Heriberto Alonzo	Cuba	37.36	
6	James Lowe	Honduras	36.66	
	Carlos Hidalgo	Puerto Rico	NM	

=== Hammer throw ===
1 March

Rank	Name	Nationality	Result	Notes
1st place, gold medalist(s)	Jaime Annexy	Puerto Rico	45.87	GR
2nd place, silver medalist(s)	Vicente Lagoyete	Colombia	42.64	
3rd place, bronze medalist(s)	Julio Bordás	Cuba	42.08	
4	Bernabé Sánchez	Cuba	41.29	
5	Juan Perera	Guatemala	40.65	
6	Pionono González	Colombia	39.2	
	Carlos Hidalgo	Puerto Rico	NM	
	Graulau	Puerto Rico	DNS	

=== Javelin throw ===
3 March

Rank	Name	Nationality	Result	Notes
1st place, gold medalist(s)	Enrique Pizarro	Puerto Rico	56.67	
2nd place, silver medalist(s)	Mario Salas	Cuba	55.74	
3rd place, bronze medalist(s)	Emilio Romero	Puerto Rico	55.57	
4	Reinaldo Oliver	Puerto Rico	53.63	
5	Víctor Castañeda	El Salvador	52.50	
6	Alberto Vera	Mexico	52.50	

=== Pentathlon ===
3 March

Rank	Name	Nationality	Result	Notes
1st place, gold medalist(s)	Amador Terán	Mexico	2944	
2nd place, silver medalist(s)	Víctor Castañeda	El Salvador	2779	
3rd place, bronze medalist(s)	Enrique Salazar	Guatemala	2560	
4	Lancelot Thompson	Jamaica	2554	
5	González Pared	Cuba	2512	
6	Néstor Marchany	Puerto Rico	2476	
8	Reinaldo Oliver	Puerto Rico	2436	

== Women's results ==
=== 50 metres ===
Heats – 27 February

Rank	Heat	Name	Nationality	Time	Notes
1	1	Cynthia Thompson	Jamaica	6.5	Q
2	1	Esther Villalón	Mexico	8.8	Q
1	2	Hyacinth Walters	Jamaica	6.6	Q
2	2	Graviola Ewing	Guatemala	6.7	Q
1	3	Karleen Searchwell	Jamaica	6.7	Q
2	3	Pierina Benedetti	Guatemala	7.0	Q

Final – 28 February

Rank	Name	Nationality	Time	Notes
1st place, gold medalist(s)	Hyacinth Walters	Jamaica	6.7	
2nd place, silver medalist(s)	Cynthia Thompson	Jamaica	6.8	
3rd place, bronze medalist(s)	Graviola Ewing	Guatemala	6.9	
4	Karleen Searchwell	Jamaica	6.9	
5	Esther Villalón	Mexico	7.0	
6	Pierina Benedetti	Guatemala	7.3	

=== 100 metres ===
Heats – 1 March

Rank	Heat	Name	Nationality	Time	Notes
1	1	Hyacinth Walters	Jamaica	12.3	Q
2	1	Noemi Díaz	Cuba	NT	Q
1	2	Cynthia Thompson	Jamaica	12.3	Q
2	2	Graviola Ewing	Guatemala	NT	Q
1	3	Kathleen Russell	Jamaica	12.7	Q
2	3	Bertha Delgado	Cuba	NT	Q

Final – 2 March

Rank	Name	Nationality	Time	Notes
1st place, gold medalist(s)	Hyacinth Walters	Jamaica	12.3	
2nd place, silver medalist(s)	Cynthia Thompson	Jamaica	12.4	
3rd place, bronze medalist(s)	Graviola Ewing	Guatemala	12.5	
4	Kathleen Russell	Jamaica	12.8	
5	Noemi Díaz	Cuba	12.8	
6	Bertha Delgado	Cuba	13.0	

=== 80 metres hurdles ===
Heats – 1 March

Rank	Heat	Name	Nationality	Time	Notes
1	1	Vinton Beckett	Jamaica	12.5	Q
2	1	Kathleen Russell	Jamaica	NT	Q
3	1	Esther Villalón	Mexico	NT	Q
1	2	Mercedes Herrera	Cuba	12.6	Q
2	2	Karleen Searchwell	Jamaica	NT	Q
3	2	Elia Galván	Mexico	NT	Q

Final – 2 March

Rank	Name	Nationality	Time	Notes
1st place, gold medalist(s)	Karleen Searchwell	Jamaica	12.1w	
2nd place, silver medalist(s)	Vinton Beckett	Jamaica	12.5w	
3rd place, bronze medalist(s)	Kathleen Russell	Jamaica	12.6w	
4	Mercedes Herrera	Cuba	12.7w	
5	Esther Villalón	Mexico	13.8w	
6	Elia Galván	Mexico	15.0w	

=== 4 × 100 metres relay ===
3 March

Rank	Nation	Competitors	Time	Notes
1st place, gold medalist(s)	Jamaica	Kathleen Russell, Karleen Searchwell, Hyacinth Walters, Cynthia Thompson	48.9	GR
2nd place, silver medalist(s)	Guatemala	Elia Bolaños, María Resinos, Pierina Benedetti, Graviola Ewing	52.0	
3rd place, bronze medalist(s)	Mexico	Esther Villalón, Elia Galván, Concepción Sánchez, Teresa Bobadilla	52.2	
4	Cuba		NT	
5	Colombia		NT	

=== High jump ===
27 February

Rank	Name	Nationality	Result	Notes
1st place, gold medalist(s)	Vinton Beckett	Jamaica	1.61	GR
2nd place, silver medalist(s)	Carmen Phipps	Jamaica	1.59	
3rd place, bronze medalist(s)	Lili Schluter	Mexico	1.30	
4	Miriam Callejas	Guatemala	1.21	
4	Nora Vargas	Guatemala	1.21	
4	Kasuko Kawashuma	Mexico	1.21	

=== Discus throw ===
26 February

Rank	Name	Nationality	Result	Notes
1st place, gold medalist(s)	Concepción Villanueva	Mexico	33.96	GR
2nd place, silver medalist(s)	Alejandrina Herrera	Cuba	31.78	
3rd place, bronze medalist(s)	Ana Mercedes Campos	El Salvador	30.91	
4	Judith Caballero	Panama	30.30	
5	Teresa Bobadilla	Mexico	?	
6	Carmen Maldonado	Colombia	?	

=== Javelin throw ===
1 March – old model

Rank	Name	Nationality	Result	Notes
1st place, gold medalist(s)	Judith Caballero	Panama	36.20	
2nd place, silver medalist(s)	Berta Chiú	Mexico	34.34	
3rd place, bronze medalist(s)	Ana Mercedes Campos	El Salvador	33.40	
4	Carmen Maldonado	Colombia	25.51	
