= José Vicente (pole vaulter) =

Puerto Rican academic and pole vaulter (1922–2022)

Personal information
- Full name: José Ignacio Vicente Chandler
- Born: 3 February 1922 Santurce, San Juan, Puerto Rico
- Died: 5 July 2022 (aged 100) San Juan, Puerto Rico

Sport
- Sport: Athletics
- Event: Pole vault
Medal record
Men's athletics
Representing Puerto Rico
Central American and Caribbean Games
Gold medal – first place	1946 Barranquilla	Pole vault
Gold medal – first place	1950 Guatemala City	Pole vault

José Ignacio Vicente Chandler (3 February 1922 – 5 July 2022) was a Puerto Rican pole vaulter and academic. His first career medal was a gold medal earned at the 1946 Central American and Caribbean Games, where he won it again at the subsequent Games. He has also competed for Puerto Rico at the 1948 Summer Olympics and 1952 Summer Olympics. After his sporting career, he became an academic and specialized in the study of coffee.

== Biography ==
José Ignacio Vicente Chandler was born on 3 February 1922 in Santurce, San Juan, Puerto Rico. As an athlete, he competed in athletics for Puerto Rico. His first major international medal was earned at the 1946 Central American and Caribbean Games held in Barranquilla, Colombia. He won the gold medal in the men's pole vault with a height of 3.98 metres.

Vicente was selected to compete for Puerto Rico at the 1948 Summer Olympics held in London, England, for the Puerto Rico's first appearance at any of the Summer Games. There, he was designated as the flag bearer for Puerto Rico during the opening ceremony. He competed in the qualifying round of the men's pole vault on 31 July and qualified for the finals after reaching a distance of 4.00 metres. In the finals, he placed equal ninth overall with a height of 3.95 metres. In the same year, he set a personal best in the event with 4.14 metres.

After the 1948 Summer Games, he was selected to compete at the 1950 Central American and Caribbean Games held in Guatemala City. He again won the gold medal in the men's pole vault, recording a mark of 4.10 metres. Two years later, he competed for Puerto Rico at the 1952 Summer Olympics in the same event, though did not qualify for the finals after failing to clear any height.

Upon retiring from sport, Vicente became an academic and became an expert in agriculture, especially in coffee. He worked for forty years at the Puerto Rican Agricultural Research Service (ARS) and was inducted into the ARS Hall of Fame in 1988. During his academic career, he examined multiple factors of coffee production in Puerto Rico such as picking efficiency and how it affects production. He later died on 5 July 2022 in San Juan, Puerto Rico, at the age of 100.

== International competitions ==
Year	Competition	Venue	Position	Notes
Representing Puerto Rico
1946	Central American and Caribbean Games	Barranquilla, Colombia	1st	3.98 m
1948	Olympic Games	London, United Kingdom	9th	3.95 m
1950	Central American and Caribbean Games	Guatemala City, Guatemala	1st	4.10 m
1952	Olympic Games	Helsinki, Finland	–	NM
