= Ana Mercedes Campos =

Salvadorean athlete

Personal information
- Born: July 27, 1930 Sonsonate, El Salvador
- Died: July 31, 2013 (aged 83) Sonsonate, El Salvador

Sport
- Sport: Athletics
- Event: Javelin throw
Medal record
Representing El Salvador
Central American and Caribbean Games
Gold medal – first place	1954 Mexico City	Javelin throw

Ana Mercedes Campos (July 27, 1930 – July 31, 2013) was a Salvadoran athlete recognized for her role in the 7th Central American and Caribbean Games in Mexico in 1954.

== Sports career ==
On August 10, 1954, in the framework of the 7th Central American and Caribbean Games held in Mexico, Ana Mercedes Campos will become the first Salvadoran woman to obtain a gold medal in the javelin throw category, imposing a 38.82 meters mark.

In 1967, in recognition of her legacy as an athlete, the Sonsonate municipal stadium was named Ana Mercedes Campos Stadium.

On January 25, 2012, she was recognized by the Legislative Assembly of El Salvador as "Most Deserving Daughter of El Salvador", due to "her valuable contributions in the field of national sport".

Campos died on July 31, 2013, from cardiac arrest at the ISSS hospital in her native Sonsonate.

== Awards ==
- 2012: "Most Deserving Daughter of El Salvador" Distinction, awarded by the Legislative Assembly of El Salvador.

== International competitions ==
Year	Competition	Venue	Position	Event	Notes
Representing El Salvador
1946	Central American and Caribbean Games	Guatemala City, Guatemala	14th	Discus throw	21.23 m
1946	Central American and Caribbean Games	Guatemala City, Guatemala	8th	Javelin throw	30.56 m
1950	Central American and Caribbean Games	Guatemala City, Guatemala	3rd	Discus throw	30.91 m
1950	Central American and Caribbean Games	Guatemala City, Guatemala	3rd	Javelin throw	33.40 m
1954	Central American and Caribbean Games	Mexico City, Mexico	5th	Discus throw	32.73 m
1954	Central American and Caribbean Games	Mexico City, Mexico	1st	Javelin throw	38.82 m
1959	Central American and Caribbean Games	Caracas, Venezuela	4th	Javelin throw	34.39 m
