= Vinton Beckett =

Jamaican athlete (1923–2018)

Olympic medal record

Representing Jamaica

Women's athletics

Central American and Caribbean Games
Gold medal – first place	1950 Guatemala City	High jump
Silver medal – second place	1946 Barranquilla	High jump
Silver medal – second place	1950 Guatemala City	80 metres hurdles

Vinton Ruth Beckett (12 June 1923 – 1 November 2018) was a Jamaican track and field athlete who competed at the 1948 Summer Olympics, where she was joint fourth in the women's high jump (with Doreen Dredge of Canada), 11th in the women's long jump, and eliminated in the opening round of the women's 80 metres hurdles.

Prior to the Olympics she participated in the 1946 Central American and Caribbean Games, where she won a silver medal in the high jump, behind her compatriot Carmen Phipps. Four years later, at the 1950 edition, she won the high jump event and finished second in the 80 metres hurdles behind another compatriot, Karleen Searchwell. Beckett was born in Kingston, Jamaica.

== International competitions ==
Year	Competition	Venue	Position	Event	Notes
Representing Jamaica
1946	Central American and Caribbean Games	Barranquilla, Colombia	2nd	High jump	1.52 m
1948	Olympic Games	London, United Kingdom	5th (h)	80 m hurdles	NT
1948	Olympic Games	London, United Kingdom	4th	High jump	1.58 m
1948	Olympic Games	London, United Kingdom	11th	Long jump	5.145 m
1950	Central American and Caribbean Games	Guatemala City, Guatemala	2nd	80 m hurdles	12.5 s (w)
1950	Central American and Caribbean Games	Guatemala City, Guatemala	1st	High jump	1.61 m
