= Kathleen Russell =

Kathleen Russell may refer to:

- Kathleen Russell (swimmer) (1912–1992), South African swimmer
- Kathleen Russell (athlete) (1927–1969), Jamaican long jumper, high jumper, sprinter and hurdler
