= José Barbosa =

José Barbosa may refer to:

- José Barbosa (pole vaulter), Puerto Rican pole vaulter
- José Celso Barbosa, Puerto Rican physician, sociologist and political leader
- José Luíz Barbosa, Brazilian middle-distance runner
