= Athletics at the 1951 Pan American Games – Men's 10,000 metres =

Men's 10,000 metres at the Pan American Games

The men's 10,000 metres event at the 1951 Pan American Games was held at the Estadio Monumental in Buenos Aires on 27 February.

== Results ==
Rank	Name	Nationality	Time	Notes
1st place, gold medalist(s)	Curt Stone	United States	31:08.6	
2nd place, silver medalist(s)	Ricardo Bralo	Argentina	31:10.4	
3rd place, bronze medalist(s)	Ezequiel Bustamente	Argentina	32:31.8	
4	Jesse Van Zant	United States	33:10.3	
5	Mateo Flores	Guatemala	33:14.0	
6	José Oitica	Brazil	33:43.5	
	Ignacio Franco	Paraguay	??:??.?	
	Carlton Chambers	Trinidad and Tobago	??:??.?	
	Raúl Ibarra	Argentina	DNF	
	Rene Millas	Chile	DNS	
	Gustavo Rojas	Chile	DNS	
	Browning Ross	United States	DNS	
	Luis Velásquez	Guatemala	DNS	
	Rubén Figueredo	Paraguay	DNS	
