= Ruth Beckett =

Ruth Beckett may refer to:

- Vinton Ruth Beckett (1923–2018), Jamaican female high jumper
- Ruth Beckett, fictional character in British television drama Threads
