= Mateo Flores (runner) =

Guatemalan long-distance runner (1922-2011)

Personal information
- Born: February 11, 1922 Cotió, Mixco, Guatemala
- Died: August 11, 2011 (aged 89) Mixco, Guatemala
- Height: 1.70 m (5 ft 7 in)
Medal record
Men's Athletics
Representing Guatemala
Pan American Games
Gold medal – first place	1955 Mexico City	Marathon

Doroteo Guamuch Flores, also called Mateo Flores (February 11, 1922 – August 11, 2011), was a Guatemalan long-distance runner who won several international events, including the Boston Marathon in 1952.

== Career ==
Guamuch was born in Cotió, Mixco, a city near Guatemala City. During his early athletic career, Guamuch worked as a low-paid laborer in a textile factory. He would wake at 4:00 am to run for two hours, and run an additional two hours after returning from work at 6:00 pm.

Guamuch's career spanned from 1941 to 1957; prior to winning the 1952 Boston Marathon, he was the winner of multiple international races, notably the marathon at the 1946 Barranquilla Games, the half marathon at the 1950 Central American and Caribbean Games in Guatemala, and the marathon at the 1955 Pan American Games in Mexico City. He also participated in the 1952 Summer Olympics in Helsinki.

=== 1952 Boston Marathon ===
On April 19, 1952, Guamuch participated in the Boston Marathon, a major international racing event. He took the lead from his countryman Luis H. Velasquez after the first ten miles, and, against any predictions, finished ahead of U.S. competitor Victor Dyrgall by almost five minutes, recording a time of 2 hours, 31 minutes, and 53 seconds. His record remained as a national record for Guatemala for seventeen years, until November 5, 1969, when it was broken by Julio Quevedo.

=== Honors and awards ===
The Boston achievement made Guamuch a sports icon in his country, and the Guatemalan government honored him by renaming the national stadium in Guatemala City to Estadio Nacional Mateo Flores. He was treated as a national hero by the Guatemalan government, which also awarded him the Order of the Quetzal, the nation's highest civilian honor.

== Life after retirement ==
Guamuch became a professor of physical education after his retirement. He was also a golf caddie working at the Guatemala Country Club and occasional player. He was a practicing Roman Catholic. He moved to Los Angeles, CA and lived there for several years. He moved back to Guatemala City prior to his death.

== International competitions ==
Year	Competition	Venue	Position	Event	Notes
Representing Guatemala
1946	Central American and Caribbean Games	Barranquilla, Colombia	3rd	5000 m	15:56.0
1946	Central American and Caribbean Games	Barranquilla, Colombia	1st	10,000 m	33:55.0
1946	Central American and Caribbean Games	Barranquilla, Colombia	1st	Half marathon	1:14:33
1950	Central American and Caribbean Games	Guatemala City, Guatemala	2nd	5000 m	16:10.6
1950	Central American and Caribbean Games	Guatemala City, Guatemala	5th	10,000 m	NT
1950	Central American and Caribbean Games	Guatemala City, Guatemala	2nd	Half marathon	1:15:41
1951	Pan American Games	Buenos Aires, Argentina	–	5000 m	NT
1951	Pan American Games	Buenos Aires, Argentina	5th	10,000 m	33:14.0
1952	Olympic Games	Helsinki, Finland	22nd	Marathon	2:35:40
1954	Central American and Caribbean Games	Mexico City, Mexico	1st	5000 m	15:57.30
1954	Central American and Caribbean Games	Mexico City, Mexico	2nd	10,000 m	33:52.80
1954	Central American and Caribbean Games	Mexico City, Mexico	1st	Half marathon	1:15:20
1955	Pan American Games	Mexico City, Mexico	6th	10,000 m	2:01.4
1955	Pan American Games	Mexico City, Mexico	1st	Marathon	2:59:10

== Personal bests ==
- Marathon – 2:30:18 (1952)
