= Athletics at the 1951 Pan American Games – Men's 400 metres hurdles =

Men's 400 metres hurdles at the Pan American Games

The men's 400 metres hurdles event at the 1951 Pan American Games was held at the Estadio Monumental in Buenos Aires on 27 and 28 February.

== Medalists ==
Gold	Silver	Bronze
Jaime Aparicio; Colombia	Wilson Carneiro; Brazil	Don Halderman; United States

== Results ==
=== Heats ===
Rank	Heat	Name	Nationality	Time	Notes
1	1	Don Halderman	United States	53.4	Q
2	1	Reinaldo Martín	Chile	54.3	Q
3	1	Ernesto Igler	Argentina	55.1	
4	1	Carlos Monges	Mexico	56.4	
1	2	Wilson Carneiro	Brazil	54.9	Q
2	2	Samuel Anderson	Cuba	55.4	Q
3	2	Jörn Gevert	Chile	55.4	
4	2	Ernesto Rogg	Argentina	56.6	
	2	Dick Attlesey	United States	DNS	
1	3	Jaime Aparicio	Colombia	??.?	Q
2	3	Eduardo Laca	Peru	??.?	Q
3	3	Arturo Kuntze	Argentina	??.?	
4	3	Udo Martín	Chile	??.?	

=== Final ===
Rank	Name	Nationality	Time	Notes
1st place, gold medalist(s)	Jaime Aparicio	Colombia	53.4	
2nd place, silver medalist(s)	Wilson Carneiro	Brazil	53.7	
3rd place, bronze medalist(s)	Don Halderman	United States	54.5	
4	Reinaldo Martín	Chile	55.2	
5	Eduardo Laca	Peru	??.?	
6	Samuel Anderson	Cuba	??.?	
