= Athletics at the 1938 Central American and Caribbean Games =

The athletics competition in the 1938 Central American and Caribbean Games were held at the Estadio Nacional in Panama City, Panama. It was the first time women's events were included.

== Medal summary ==
=== Men's events ===
Event	Gold		Silver		Bronze	
100 metres	Jennings Blackett; Panama	10.4	Jacinto Ortiz; Cuba	10.4e	Eulalio Villodas; Puerto Rico	10.6e
200 metres	Jacinto Ortiz; Cuba	21.7	Eulalio Villodas; Puerto Rico	21.8e	Arthur Jones; Jamaica	22.0e
400 metres	Arturo Baker; Panama	49.7	Adolfo Curiel; Mexico		Gilberto Castruita; Mexico	
800 metres	Arthur Wint; Jamaica	1:56.3	Alfredo Mariscal; Mexico	1:56.6e	Pedro Zúñiga; Mexico	1:56.7e
1500 metres	Guy Grant; Jamaica	4:13.6	Alfredo Cortés; Mexico	4:13.8e	Miguel Corona; Mexico	
5000 metres	Guy Grant; Jamaica	17:55.1	Jesús Borgonio; Mexico		Maríano Ramírez; Mexico	
10,000 metres	Agustín Romero; Mexico	34:15.1	Guadalupe Martínez; Mexico		José López; El Salvador	
Marathon	José Thompson; Panama	03:01:04	Estanislao Galicia; Mexico		Hilario Hernández; Mexico	
110 metres hurdles	Horacio Quiñones; Puerto Rico	14.8	Teófilo Colón; Puerto Rico	14.9e	Roberto Sánchez; Mexico	15.2e
400 metres hurdles	Evelio Espinosa; Cuba	55.8	Salvador Torrós; Puerto Rico	55.9e	Arthur Wint; Jamaica	
4 × 100 m relay	Puerto Rico; Eulalio Villodas; Eugenio Guerra; Rubén Malavé; Gaspar Vázquez	42.2	Panama; Teófilo Thomas; Gilberto Campbell; Jennings Blackett; Carlos Belisario	42.7e	Cuba; Jacinto Ortiz; José Acosta; Norberto Verrier; Hilario Sotolongo	42.8e
4 × 400 m relay	Panama; Harold Scott; Stanley Edgardo; Wesley Chevans; Arturo Baker	3:21.5	Mexico; Adolfo Curiel; Alfredo Mariscal; Gilberto Castruita; Enrique Sánchez	3:23.0e	Cuba; Armando Baluja; Gerardo Casanova; Luis Vázquez; Evelio Espínola	3:24.5e
High jump	Juan Luyanda; Puerto Rico	1.89	Arturo Baker; Panama	1.87	Juan Rafael Palmer; Puerto Rico	1.83
Pole vault	Rigoberto Pérez; Mexico	3.74	José Sabater; Puerto Rico	3.65	Manuel Boyer; Puerto Rico	3.65
Long jump	Juan Luyanda; Puerto Rico	6.75	Juan Rafael Palmer; Puerto Rico	6.69	Salvador Torrós; Puerto Rico	6.55
Triple jump	Juan Rafael Palmer; Puerto Rico	13.86	Juan Luyanda; Puerto Rico	13.76	Orlando Bello; Cuba	13.75
Shot put	Antulio Pietri; Puerto Rico	13.50	Fernando Torres; Puerto Rico	13.30	Ian Murphy; Puerto Rico	13.08
Discus throw	Ian Murphy; Puerto Rico	42.42	Heriberto Alonso; Cuba	40.73	Miguel Gutiérrez; Cuba	40.47
Hammer throw	Bernabé Sánchez; Cuba	39.85	Francisco González; Mexico	38.18	Ignacio Vázquez; Cuba	37.45
Javelin throw	Antonio Figueroa; Puerto Rico	64.11	Mario Salas; Cuba	58.76	Wilfredo Benítez; Mexico	56.43
Pentathlon	Salvador Torrós; Puerto Rico	3459	Manuel Suárez; Cuba	3158	Juan Luyanda; Puerto Rico	3097

=== Women's events ===
Event	Gold		Silver		Bronze	
100 metres	Nola Thorne; Panama	12.6	Nilda Villaverde; Panama	12.6e	Adela Montilla; Panama	12.7e
80 metres hurdles	Nola Thorne; Panama	13.3	Aura Morales; Panama	13.6e	Nilda Villaverde; Panama	
4 × 100 m relay	Panama; Natalia Taivez; Nola Thorne; Adela Montilla; Nilda Villaverde	51.3	Cuba; Marta Velasco; Carmen Ortega; Zenaida Castro; Olga Agüero		Jamaica; Gertrude Messam; Rhona Saunders; Beryl Delgado; Icis Clarke	
High jump	Lilia Wilson; Panama	1.41	Beryl Delgado; Jamaica	1.39	Isabel Sullivan; Panama	1.32
Discus throw	Rebecca Coldberg; Puerto Rico	27.81	Esperanza Morales; Mexico	24.89	Irma Cornejo; El Salvador	23.89
Javelin throw	Rebecca Coldberg; Puerto Rico	30.25	Marina Soto; Mexico	29.30	Florinda Viamontes; Cuba	28.16

== Medal table ==
Rank	Nation	Gold	Silver	Bronze	Total
1	Puerto Rico (PUR)	11	7	6	24
2	Panama (PAN)	8	4	3	15
3	Cuba (CUB)	3	5	6	14
4	Jamaica (JAM)	3	1	3	7
5	Mexico (MEX)	2	10	7	19
6	El Salvador (ESA)	0	0	2	2
Totals (6 entries)		27	27	27	81
