= Wilson Carneiro =

Brazilian hurdler (born 1930)

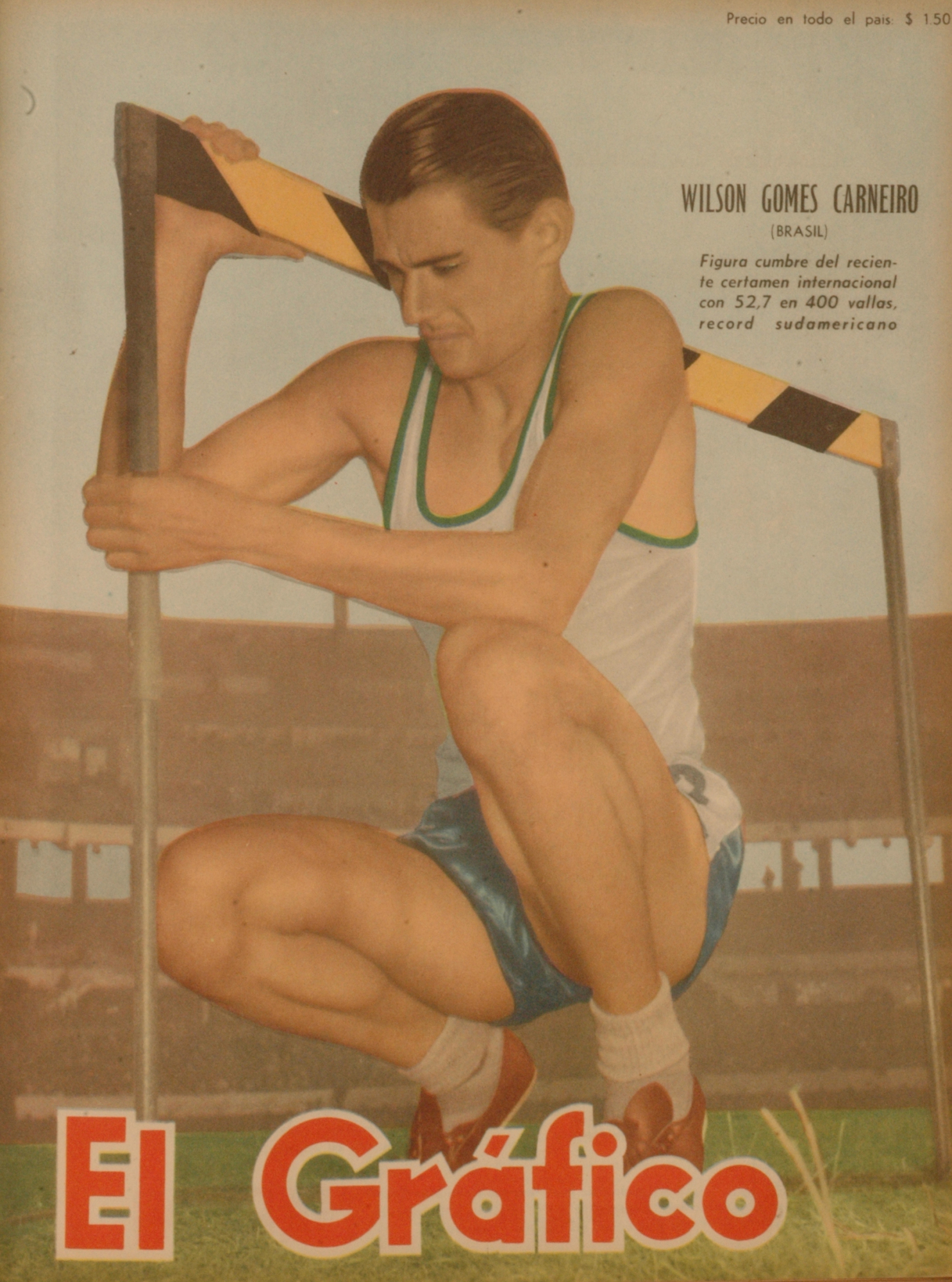
- Carneiro on the cover of El Gráfico, 1952

Personal information
- Born: 3 July 1930 (age 96) Rio de Janeiro, Brazil
- Height: 1.85 m (6 ft 1 in)
- Weight: 73 kg (161 lb)

Sport
- Sport: Track and field
- Event: 400 metres hurdles

Wilson Gomes Carneiro (born 3 July 1930) is a retired Brazilian hurdler. He competed in the men's 400 metres hurdles at the 1952 Summer Olympics. He was also the first Brazilian individual medalist at the Pan American Games, winning the silver medal in the 400 metres hurdles in the 1951 Pan American Games in Buenos Aires.

== International competitions ==
Year	Competition	Venue	Position	Event	Notes
Representing Brazil
1949	South American Championships	Lima, Peru	3rd	110 m hurdles	14.9
1951	Pan American Games	Buenos Aires, Argentina	5th	110 m hurdles	14.7
1951	Pan American Games	Buenos Aires, Argentina	2nd	400 m hurdles	53.7
1952	South American Championships	Buenos Aires, Argentina	3rd	110 m hurdles	15.1
1952	South American Championships	Buenos Aires, Argentina	1st	400 m hurdles	52.7
1952	South American Championships	Buenos Aires, Argentina	1st	4 × 400 m relay	3:17.5
1952	Olympic Games	Helsinki, Finland	22nd (qf)	400 m hurdles	59.4
1953	South American Championships (unofficial)	Santiago, Chile	2nd	110 m hurdles	14.7
1953	South American Championships (unofficial)	Santiago, Chile	1st	400 m hurdles	51.9
1953	South American Championships (unofficial)	Santiago, Chile	1st	4 × 400 m relay	3:15.5
1954	South American Championships	São Paulo, Brazil	1st	110 m hurdles	14.3 (w)
1954	South American Championships	São Paulo, Brazil	2nd	400 m hurdles	53.5
1955	Pan American Games	Mexico City, Mexico	6th	110 m hurdles	16.65
1955	Pan American Games	Mexico City, Mexico	3rd	400 m hurdles	53.0
1955	Pan American Games	Mexico City, Mexico	5th	4 × 400 m relay	3:16.71
1957	South American Championships (unofficial)	Santiago, Chile	3rd	110 m hurdles	15.3
1958	South American Championships	Montevideo, Uruguay	1st	110 m hurdles	14.9
1959	South American Championships (unofficial)	São Paulo, Brazil	1st	110 m hurdles	14.8
1959	Pan American Games	Chicago, United States	6th	110 m hurdles	14.9

== Personal bests ==
- 400 metres hurdles – 51.9h (1953)
