= Benjamín Casado =

Puerto Rican high jumper

Personal information
- Nationality: Puerto Rican
- Born: 29 July 1928 Carolina, Puerto Rico
- Died: 9 January 2002 (aged 73) San Juan, Puerto Rico

Sport
- Sport: Athletics
- Events: High jump, triple jump

Benjamín Casado (29 July 1928 – 9 January 2002) was a Puerto Rican athlete. He competed in the men's high jump at the 1948 Summer Olympics.

== International competitions ==
Year	Competition	Venue	Position	Event	Notes
Representing Puerto Rico
1948	Olympic Games	London, United Kingdom	21st (q)	High jump	1.84 m
1950	Central American and Caribbean Games	Guatemala City, Guatemala	3rd	High jump	1.85 m
1950	Central American and Caribbean Games	Guatemala City, Guatemala	2nd	Long jump	6.95 m
1950	Central American and Caribbean Games	Guatemala City, Guatemala	3rd	Triple jump	13.57 m

== Personal bests ==
- High jump – 1.969 metres (1949)
