= Dick Attlesey =

American hurdler and world record breaker (1929–1984)

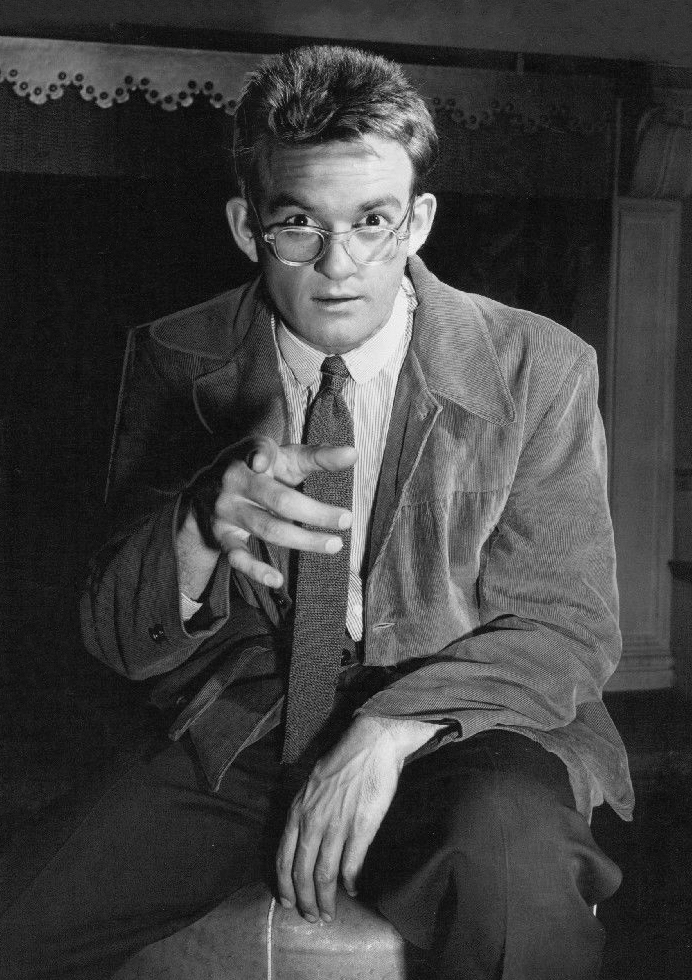
- Attlesey in 1950

Personal information
- Full name: Richard Harold Attlesey
- Born: May 10, 1929 Compton, California, U.S.
- Died: October 14, 1984 (aged 55)

Sport
- Sport: Athletics
- Events: 100 m, 110 m hurdles

Achievements and titles
- Personal bests: 100 m – 10.6 (1950); 110 mH – 13.5 (1950)
Medal record
Men's athletics
Representing the United States
Pan American Games
| Gold medal – first place | 1951 Buenos Aires | 110 m hurdles |
| Gold medal – first place | 1951 Buenos Aires | 4 × 100 m relay |

Richard Harold Attlesey (May 10, 1929 – October 14, 1984) was an American sprinter who mostly competed in the 110-meter hurdles. He set world records for the event twice in 1950 with times of 13.6 and 13.5 seconds.

Attlesey won the 110 m hurdles event at the 1950 Amateur Athletic Union Championships and repeated the feat the year after. He won the hurdles gold medal at the first edition of Pan American Games in 1951. He competed collegiately for the University of Southern California and won the NCAA title in 1950. After an almost two-year winning streak, injuries curtailed his career in 1952.

== Career ==
Born in Compton, California, he began his hurdling career while at the University of Southern California. Representing the USC Trojans, he was the runner-up in the 110-yard hurdles at the Pacific Coast Conference and NCAA Outdoor Championships in 1949. He placed second at the Pacific Coast Conference vs. Big Ten Conference meet in June that year before going on to place third in the event at the Amateur Athletic Union championship race in Fresno, California. A win in Amsterdam on August 14, 1949 marked the beginning of an undefeated streak of 55 races in the hurdles, which lasted until July 3, 1951.

His 1950 season saw him win at the Long Beach Relays, West Coast Relays, California Relays and the Pacific Coast championships. He won the 110-yd hurdles title at the 1950 NCAA Outdoor meet in a time of 14 seconds flat. Attlesey won his first U.S. championship race over the distance with a world record time of 13.6 seconds. He then travelled to an international track meet in Helsinki, Finland, the month after and improved the record further with a time of 13.5 seconds. He competed extensively in Finland in July 1951, winning all his races abroad.

In March 1951, Attlesey headed to the 1951 Pan American Games in Buenos Aires with the American team. At the inaugural edition of the competition he defeated the host nation's top hurdler, Estanislao Kocourek, to lift the first ever Pan American 110 m hurdles title for the United States. He returned to California in April to compete collegiately and he continued his hurdles winning streak. He repeated as the AAU 110 m hurdles champion in June, winning the race in a time of 13.8 seconds. After his national title win, he travelled to Europe for a series of high level competitions. He won his first race in Milan, but failed to finish in his following date in Bern, bringing his undefeated streak to an end after almost two years. In spite of this, he won all the rest of his hurdles races on his tour of France, West Germany, Switzerland and Austria.

Attlesey suffered an injury in 1952 and this seriously affected his form. He came fifth at the West Coast Relays and was runner-up at the California Relays. At the Olympic Trials he failed to gain a spot on the American team for the 1952 Helsinki Olympics as he finished seventh in his heat in a comparatively pedestrian time of 15.1 seconds. He showed a return to good condition at the West Coast Relays in 1953, running 14.1 seconds for second place, but this proved to be the final outing of his hurdling career.
