= Athletics at the 1959 Pan American Games – Men's 110 metres hurdles =

Men's 110 metres hurdles at the Pan American Games

The men's 110 metres hurdles event at the 1959 Pan American Games was held at the Soldier Field in Chicago on 30 and 31 August.

== Medalists ==
Gold	Silver	Bronze
Hayes Jones; United States	Lee Calhoun; United States	Elias Gilbert; United States

== Results ==
=== Heats ===
Wind:
Heat 1: 0.0 m/s, Heat 2: 0.0 m/s

Rank	Heat	Name	Nationality	Time	Notes
1	1	Lee Calhoun	United States	14.5	Q
2	1	Evaristo Iglesias	Cuba	14.6	Q
3	1	Wilson Carneiro	Brazil	15.2	Q
4	1	Cliff Murray	British Guiana	15.5	Q
5	1	Gabriel Roldán	Mexico	15.6	
1	2	Hayes Jones	United States	14.3	Q
2	2	Elias Gilbert	United States	14.5	Q
3	2	Lázaro Betancourt	Cuba	14.9	Q
4	2	Ijoel da Silva	Brazil	15.8	Q
	2	Victor Flores	Venezuela	DNS	
	2	Arturo Isasmondi	Uruguay	DNS	

=== Final ===
Wind: +2.5 m/s

Rank	Name	Nationality	Time	Notes
1st place, gold medalist(s)	Hayes Jones	United States	13.6	
2nd place, silver medalist(s)	Lee Calhoun	United States	13.7	
3rd place, bronze medalist(s)	Elias Gilbert	United States	14.0	
4	Evaristo Iglesias	Cuba	14.6	
5	Lázaro Betancourt	Cuba	14.6	
6	Wilson Carneiro	Brazil	14.9	
7	Ijoel da Silva	Brazil	??.?	
8	Cliff Murray	British Guiana	??.?	
