= Francisco Castro (jumper) =

Puerto Rican athletics competitor

Personal information
- Full name: Francisco Castro Malinsky Colón
- Nationality: Puerto Rican
- Born: 29 January 1922 Cayey, Puerto Rico
- Died: 14 December 2008 Orlando, Florida

Sport
- Sport: Athletics
- Event: Long jump

Francisco Castro Malinsky Colón (29 January 1922 in Cayey, Puerto Rico – 14 December 2008 in Orlando, Florida) was a Puerto Rican long jumper and triple jumper who competed in the 1952 Summer Olympics.

== International competitions ==
| Year | Competition | Venue | Position | Event | Notes |
Representing Puerto Rico
| 1946 | Central American and Caribbean Games | Barranquilla, Colombia | 3rd | High jump | 1.85 m |
| 1946 | Central American and Caribbean Games | Barranquilla, Colombia | 3rd | Long jump | 6.92 m |
| 1946 | Central American and Caribbean Games | Barranquilla, Colombia | 2nd | Triple jump | 14.14 m |
| 1950 | Central American and Caribbean Games | Guatemala City, Guatemala | 1st | Long jump | 7.01 m |
| 1950 | Central American and Caribbean Games | Guatemala City, Guatemala | 2nd | Triple jump | 14.10 m |
| 1952 | Olympic Games | Helsinki, Finland | 35th (q) | Triple jump | 13.37 m |
| 1954 | Central American and Caribbean Games | Mexico City, Mexico | 6th | Long jump | 6.84 m |
| 1954 | Central American and Caribbean Games | Mexico City, Mexico | 9th | Triple jump | 13.74 m |

== Personal bests ==
- Triple jump – 14.29 m (1944)
