= Athletics at the 1950 Central American and Caribbean Games =

Athletics at the VI CAC Games
- The host stadium
- Dates: 26 February – 3 March 1950
- Host city: Guatemala City, Guatemala
- Venue: Estadio Olímpico
- Events: 28

The athletics competition in the 1950 Central American and Caribbean Games were held at the Estadio Olímpico in Guatemala City, Guatemala, between 26 February and 3 March.

== Medal summary ==
=== Men's events ===
Event	Gold		Silver		Bronze	
100 metres (wind: +5.2 m/s)	Rafael Fortún; Cuba	10.3Aw	Herb McKenley; Jamaica	10.4Aw	Lloyd La Beach; Panama	10.5Aw
200 metres	Herb McKenley; Jamaica	20.9Aw	Rafael Fortún; Cuba	21.2Aw	Lloyd La Beach; Panama	21.2Aw
400 metres	Herb McKenley; Jamaica	47.8A GR	George Rhoden; Jamaica	48.3A	Cirilo McSween; Panama	49.3A
800 metres	George Rhoden; Jamaica	1:59.4A	Frank Prince; Panama	1:59.5A	Frank Rivera; Puerto Rico	2:01.1A
1500 metres	Frank Prince; Panama	4:13.0A	Ken Hyland; Trinidad and Tobago	4:14.8A	Guillermo Rojas; Guatemala	4:15.0A
5000 metres	Francisco Hernández; Mexico	16:05.8A	Doroteo Flores; Guatemala	16:10.6A	Isidoro Reséndiz; Mexico	16:24.7A
10,000 metres	Luis Velásquez; Guatemala	34:33.6A	Isidoro Reséndiz; Mexico	34:50.7A	Cruz Serrano; Mexico	34:52.5A
Half marathon	Luis Velásquez; Guatemala	1:14:44A	Doroteo Flores; Guatemala	1:15:41A	Gustavo Ramírez; Colombia	1:17:14A
110 metres hurdles	Julio Sabater; Puerto Rico	14.9A	Samuel Anderson; Cuba	15.2A	Vicente Tavárez; Mexico	15.2A
400 metres hurdles	Jaime Aparicio; Colombia	54.9A GR	Relín Sosa; Puerto Rico	56.6A	Carlos Monges; Mexico	57.3A
4 × 100 metres relay	Cuba; Rafael Fortún; Jesús Farrés; Raúl Mazorra; Dioscórides Wilson	41.5A GR	Jamaica; George Rhoden; Lancelot Thompson; Leslie Laing; Herb McKenley	41.6A	Panama; Lloyd LaBeach; Samuel LaBeach; Felipe Malcoln; Cirilo McSween	42.0A
4 × 400 metres relay	Panama; Samuel LaBeach; Cirilo McSween; Frank Prince; Lloyd LaBeach	3:17.2A GR	Cuba; Hermes Riverí; Juan Sáez; Ángel García; Evelio Planas	3:19.0A	Jamaica; Benson Ford; Leslie Laing; Egbert McNeil; George Rhoden	3:19.0A
High jump	Gilberto Torres; Puerto Rico	1.89A GR	Oswald Lyon; Jamaica	1.89A =GR	Benjamín Casado; Puerto Rico	1.85A
Pole vault	José Vincente; Puerto Rico	4.10A GR	José Barbosa; Puerto Rico	3.78A	José Fontanés; Puerto Rico	3.63A
Long jump	Francisco Castro; Puerto Rico	7.01A GR	Benjamín Casado; Puerto Rico	6.95A	Claudio Cabrejas; Cuba	6.94A
Triple jump	Reinaldo Salamo; Puerto Rico	14.20A GR	Francisco Castro; Puerto Rico	14.10A	Benjamín Casado; Puerto Rico	13.57A
Shot put	Israel Capavete; Puerto Rico	13.78A GR	Eduardo Adriana; Curaçao	13.67A	Gerardo de Villiers; Cuba	13.23A
Discus throw	Eduardo Parera; Cuba	40.54A	Manuel Seoane; Puerto Rico	38.88A	Juan Luyanda; Puerto Rico	37.75A
Hammer throw	Jaime Annexy; Puerto Rico	45.87A GR	Vicente Lagoyete; Colombia	42.64A	Julio Bordás; Cuba	42.08A
Javelin throw	Enrique Pizarro; Puerto Rico	56.67A	Mario Salas; Cuba	55.74A	Emilio Romero; Puerto Rico	55.57A
Pentathlon	Amador Terán; Mexico	2944A	Víctor Castañeda; El Salvador	2779A	Enrique Salazar; Guatemala	2560A

=== Women's events ===
Event	Gold		Silver		Bronze	
50 metres	Hyacinth Walters; Jamaica	6.7A	Cynthia Thompson; Jamaica	6.8A	Graviola Ewing; Guatemala	6.9A
100 metres	Hyacinth Walters; Jamaica	12.3A	Cynthia Thompson; Jamaica	12.4A	Graviola Ewing; Guatemala	12.5A
80 metres hurdles	Karleen Searchwell; Jamaica	12.1Aw	Vinton Beckett; Jamaica	12.5Aw	Kathleen Russell; Jamaica	12.6Aw
4 × 100 m relay	Jamaica; Kathleen Russell; Karleen Searchwell; Hyacinth Walters; Cynthia Thompson	48.9A	Guatemala; Elia Bolaños; María Resinos; Pierina Benedetti; Graviola Ewing	52.0A	Mexico; Esther Villalón; Elia Galván; Concepción Sánchez; Teresa Bobadilla	52.2A
High jump	Vinton Beckett; Jamaica	1.61A GR	Carmen Phipps; Jamaica	1.59A	Lili Schluter; Mexico	1.30A
Discus throw	Concepción Villanueva; Mexico	33.96A GR	Alejandrina Herrera; Cuba	31.78A	Ana Campos; El Salvador	30.91A
Javelin throw	Judith Caballero; Panama	36.20A	Berta Chiú; Mexico	34.33A	Ana Campos; El Salvador	33.40A

== Medal table ==
Rank	Nation	Gold	Silver	Bronze	Total
1	Jamaica (JAM)	8	8	2	18
2	Puerto Rico (PUR)	8	5	6	19
3	Cuba (CUB)	3	5	3	11
4	Mexico (MEX)	3	2	6	11
5	Panama (PAN)	3	1	4	8
6	Guatemala (GUA)	2	3	4	9
7	Colombia (COL)	1	1	1	3
8	El Salvador (ESA)	0	1	2	3
9	Curaçao	0	1	0	1
9	Trinidad and Tobago (TTO)	0	1	0	1
Totals (10 entries)		28	28	28	84
