= Athletics at the 1955 Pan American Games – Men's marathon =

Men's marathon at the Pan American Games

The men's marathon event at the 1955 Pan American Games was held at the Estadio Universitario in Mexico City on 19 March.

== Results ==
Rank	Name	Nationality	Time	Notes
1st place, gold medalist(s)	Doroteo Flores	Guatemala	2:59:10	
2nd place, silver medalist(s)	Onésimo Rodríguez	Mexico	3:02:22	
3rd place, bronze medalist(s)	Luis Velásquez	Guatemala	3:05:26	
4	Galdino Ramírez	Mexico	3:10:14	
5	Barry Lush	Canada	3:17:54	
6	George Norman	Canada	3:45:40	
	Raúl Ibarra	Argentina	DNF	
	Keith Dunnett	Canada	DNF	
	John Kelley	United States	DNF	
	Pedro Torres	El Salvador	DNF	
	Nery Losse	Guatemala	DNF	
	Carlos Troncoso	Colombia	DNF	
	Ted Corbitt	United States	DNF	
	Carlos Yoc	Guatemala	DNS	
