= Julio Sabater =

Puerto Rican hurdler

Julio Enrique Sabater Arroyo (18 December 1926 in Ponce, Puerto Rico– 5 February 2003 in New York City, New York) was a Puerto Rican hurdler who competed in the 1948 Summer Olympics.

== International competitions ==
Year	Competition	Venue	Position	Event	Notes
Representing Puerto Rico
1946	Central American and Caribbean Games	Barranquilla, Colombia	3rd	110 m hurdles	
1948	Olympic Games	London, United Kingdom	3rd (h)	110 m hurdles	15.3
1950	Central American and Caribbean Games	Guatemala City, Guatemala	1st	110 m hurdles	14.9
1954	Central American and Caribbean Games	Mexico City, Mexico	6th	110 m hurdles	15.4

== Personal bests ==
- 110 metres hurdles – 14.6h (1948)
