= Herb McKenley =

Jamaican sprinter (1922–2007)

The Hon. Herb McKenley OM OJ OD CD
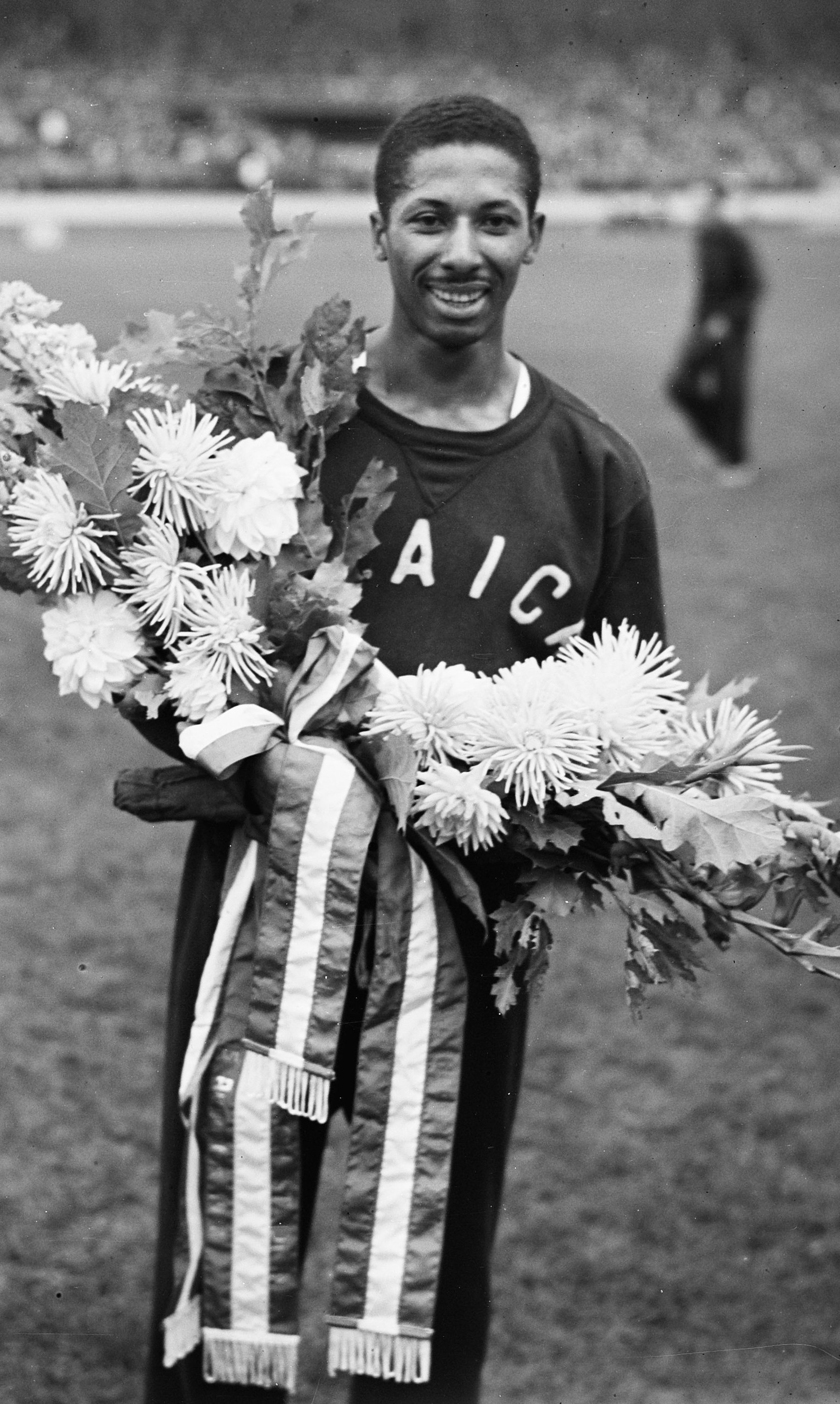
- Herb McKenley in 1948

Personal information
- Born: 10 July 1922 Pleasant Valley, Clarendon, Jamaica
- Died: 26 November 2007 (aged 85) Kingston, Jamaica
- Height: 1.85 m (6 ft 1 in)
- Weight: 72 kg (159 lb)

Sport
- Country: Jamaica
- Sport: Sprint running
- Club: Illinois Fighting Illini
Medal record
Olympic Games
Gold medal – first place	1952 Helsinki	4 × 400 m
Silver medal – second place	1948 London	400 m
Silver medal – second place	1952 Helsinki	100 m
Silver medal – second place	1952 Helsinki	400 m
Pan American Games
Bronze medal – third place	1951 Buenos Aires	100 m
Bronze medal – third place	1951 Buenos Aires	200 m
Bronze medal – third place	1951 Buenos Aires	400 m
Central American and Caribbean Games
Gold medal – first place	1950 Guatemala City	200 m
Gold medal – first place	1950 Guatemala City	400 m
Silver medal – second place	1950 Guatemala City	100 m
Silver medal – second place	1950 Guatemala City	4 × 100 m relay

The Hon. Herbert Henry McKenley OM (10 July 1922 – 26 November 2007) was a Jamaican track and field sprinter. He competed at the 1948 and 1952 Olympics in six events in total, and won one gold and three silver medals.

Born in Pleasant Valley, Clarendon, Jamaica, Herb McKenley competed on the Boston College Eagles track and field team, placing runner-up in the 440 yards at the 1944 NCAA track and field championships before transferring to the Illinois Fighting Illini track and field program. He then won the NCAA championships in 220 yd (200 m) and 440 yd (400 m) in 1946 and 1947. He was also the AAU champion in the 440-yard dash in 1945, 1947 and 1948, and was also the head of the list of world best times in 100 m (10.3), 200 m (20.4) and 400 m (46.2) in 1947. He is the only person to ever have achieved this feat.

Just before the 1948 London Olympics, McKenley ran the new world record in 440 yd (400 m) of 46.0, a record he broke again a month later, clocking 45.9. But at the Olympics itself, McKenley finished only second in 400 m, behind teammate Arthur Wint and was fourth in 200 m. He probably lost a gold medal in the 4 × 400 m relay when Wint pulled his muscle in the final. He is the only person to have made the final in all three sprinting events, the 100 m, 200 m and 400 m in the Olympics.

Perhaps because of his success across the wide variation of distances, McKenley was known to have an uneven pace, blasting out to an early lead, but slowing towards the end of a 400 meters. 23 August 1947, on a wind-aided straight, boardwalk at Long Branch, New Jersey, McKenley was timed in 45.0 for 440 yards, a claimant to being the first person to break the 45 second barrier at 400 meters.

At the first 1951 Pan-American Games in Buenos Aires, McKenley was third in 100 m, 200 m and 400 m, the only person to ever perform this feat.

At the Helsinki Olympics, McKenley was second in 100 m (the first four clocked 10.4 in a very close race) and also second in 400 m. He finally got his Olympic gold, when he helped the Jamaican 4 × 400 m relay team to win the race with a new world record of 3.03.9. His remarkable 44.6 leg is credited with pulling Jamaica into contention. It is considered one of the greatest relay legs in history.

After retiring from sports, McKenley was a coach of the Jamaica national team from 1954 to 1973 and served also as a president of Jamaica Amateur Athletics Association. For his contributions in track and field, he was awarded the Jamaican Order of Merit in 2004.

McKenley died at the University Hospital of the West Indies, according to Howard Aris, president of the Jamaica Amateur Athletics Association, who was speaking for the family. The cause of death was complications of pneumonia.

== Competition record ==
Year	Competition	Venue	Position	Event	Notes
Representing Jamaica
1946	Central American and Caribbean Games	Barranquilla, Colombia	2nd	100 m	10.7
1946	Central American and Caribbean Games	Barranquilla, Colombia	3rd	200 m	21.7
1946	Central American and Caribbean Games	Barranquilla, Colombia	2nd	400 m	48.5
1946	Central American and Caribbean Games	Barranquilla, Colombia	1st	4 × 400 m relay	3:18.0
1948	Olympic Games	London, United Kingdom	4th	200 m	21.3
1948	Olympic Games	London, United Kingdom	2nd	400 m	46.53
1948	Olympic Games	London, United Kingdom	2nd (h)	4 × 400 m relay	3:14.0^{1}
1950	Central American and Caribbean Games	Guatemala City, Guatemala	2nd	100 m	10.4Aw
1950	Central American and Caribbean Games	Guatemala City, Guatemala	1st	200 m	20.9Aw
1950	Central American and Caribbean Games	Guatemala City, Guatemala	1st	400 m	47.8A
1950	Central American and Caribbean Games	Guatemala City, Guatemala	2nd	4 × 100 m relay	41.6
1951	Pan American Games	Buenos Aires, Argentina	3rd	100 m	11.0
1951	Pan American Games	Buenos Aires, Argentina	3rd	200 m	21.5
1951	Pan American Games	Buenos Aires, Argentina	3rd	400 m	48.2
1952	Olympic Games	Helsinki, Finland	2nd	100 m	10.80
1952	Olympic Games	Helsinki, Finland	2nd	400 m	46.20
1952	Olympic Games	Helsinki, Finland	1st	4 × 400 m relay	3:04.04

^{1}Did not finish in the final
