= Arthur Wint =

Jamaican sprinter (1920–1992)

The Honourable Arthur Wint OD MBE
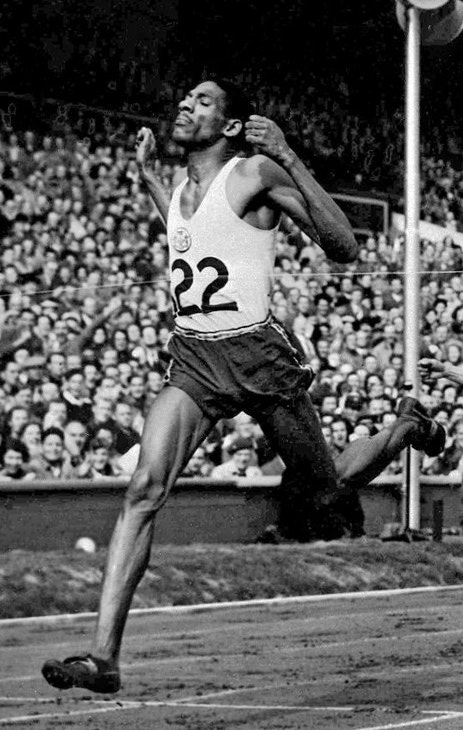
- Wint wins the 1948 Olympic 400 m final

Personal information
- Born: 25 May 1920 Plowden, Jamaica, British Empire
- Died: 19 October 1992 (aged 72) Linstead, Jamaica
- Height: 194 cm (6 ft 4 in)
- Weight: 77 kg (170 lb)

Sport
- Sport: Athletics
- Events: 400 m, 800 m ran in London
- Club: Polytechnic Harriers

Achievements and titles
- Personal bests: 400 m – 46.2 (1948); 800 m – 1:48.9y (1951)
Medal record
Representing Jamaica
Olympic Games
Gold medal – first place	1948 London	400 metres
Gold medal – first place	1952 Helsinki	4 × 400 m relay
Silver medal – second place	1948 London	800 metres
Silver medal – second place	1952 Helsinki	800 metres
Central American and Caribbean Games
Gold medal – first place	1938 Panama	800 metres
Gold medal – first place	1946 Barranquilla	400 metres
Gold medal – first place	1946 Barranquilla	800 metres
Gold medal – first place	1946 Barranquilla	4 × 400 m relay

High Commission of Jamaica, London of Jamaica to United Kingdom
- In office July 1974 – March 1978
- Preceded by: Henry Laurence Lindo
- Succeeded by: Ernest Grafford Peart
- Military career
- Allegiance: United Kingdom
- Branch: Royal Air Force
- Service years: 1942-1947
- Rank: Flight Lieutenant

Arthur Stanley Wint OD MBE (25 May 1920 – 19 October 1992) was a Jamaican Royal Air Force (RAF) pilot during the Second World War, a sprinter, a physician, and later the High Commissioner to the United Kingdom. While competing at the 1948 and 1952 Olympics, whilst a medical student at St Bartholomew's Hospital, London, he won two gold and two silver medals, becoming the first Jamaican Olympic gold medalist.

== Biography ==
Arthur Wint, known as the Gentle Giant, was born in Plowden, Manchester, Jamaica. While at Calabar High School, he ran sprints and did both the high jump and long jump. He later transferred to Excelsior High School, where he finished his secondary education. In 1937 he was the Jamaica Boy Athlete of the year, and the following year won a gold medal in the 800 metres at the Central American Games in Panama.

In 1942 he joined the British Commonwealth Air Training Plan and set the Canadian 400-metre record while training there. He was sent to Great Britain for active combat during World War II as a Spitfire pilot. He left the Royal Air Force in 1947 to study medicine at St Bartholomew's Hospital, through the British further education and vocational training scheme for ex-servicemen.

Wint won the British AAA Championships titles in the 440 and 880 yards events at the 1946 AAA Championships. He would later win three more AAA titles.

In the 1948 London Games, Wint won Jamaica's first Olympic gold medal for the 400 metres (46.2 seconds), beating his team-mate Herb McKenley. In the 800 metres he won silver, after American Mal Whitfield's gold. Wint missed a probable third medal when he pulled a muscle in the 4 × 400 metres relay final.

In Helsinki in 1952 he was part of the historic team setting the world record while capturing the gold in the 4 × 400 metres relay. He also won silver in the 800 metres, again coming second to Mal Whitfield.

Wint ran his final race in 1953 at Wembley Stadium, finished his internship, and graduated as a doctor. The following year he was made a Member of the Order of the British Empire (MBE) by Queen Elizabeth II in the 1954 New Year Honours. In 1955 Wint returned to Jamaica, eventually settling in Hanover as the only resident doctor in the parish. In 1973 he was awarded the Jamaica honour of the Order of Distinction. He served as Jamaica's High Commissioner to Britain and ambassador to Sweden and Denmark from 1974 to 1978. He was inducted in the Black Athlete's Hall of Fame in the US (1977), the Jamaica Sports Hall of Fame (1989) and the Central American & Caribbean Athletic Confederation Hall of Fame (2003).

== Death and legacy ==
Wint died on Heroes Day in Linstead, aged 72. His funeral was attended by hundreds of people, including the Jamaican Prime Minister. In 2012, a Blue Heritage Plaque was unveiled at 22 Philbeach Gardens in Earls Court, London, where he lived while studying medicine. At the same event, his daughter launched her book about him, titled The Longer Run.

== See also ==
- RAF Bomber Command
- Tuskegee Airmen
- RAF Bomber Command aircrew of World War II
