= Evaristo Iglesias =

Cuban sprinter (1925–2005)

Personal information
- Full name: Evaristo Iglesias Royero
- Born: 26 October 1925 San Juan y Martinez, Cuba
- Died: 12 May 2005 (aged 79) Deltona, United States
- Height: 1.83 m (6 ft 0 in)
- Weight: 72 kg (159 lb)

Sport
- Sport: Sprinting
- Events: 110 metres hurdles, 100 metres

Evaristo Iglesias Royero (26 October 1925 – 12 May 2005) was a Cuban hurdler. He competed in the men's 110 metres hurdles at the 1956 Summer Olympics.

== International competitions ==
Year	Competition	Venue	Position	Event	Notes
Representing Cuba
1954	Central American and Caribbean Games	Mexico City, Mexico	4th	110 m hurdles	15.2
1954	Central American and Caribbean Games	Mexico City, Mexico	11th (h)	400 m hurdles	58.5
1955	Pan American Games	Mexico City, Mexico	3rd	110 m hurdles	14.94
1955	Pan American Games	Mexico City, Mexico	7th	4 × 100 m relay	NT
1956	Olympic Games	Melbourne, Australia	55th (h)	100 m	11.50
1956	Olympic Games	Melbourne, Australia	8th (sf)	110 m hurdles	14.73
1959	Pan American Games	Chicago, United States	4th	110 m hurdles	14.6
1959	Pan American Games	Chicago, United States	6th (h)	4 × 100 m relay	42.5

== Personal bests ==
- 110 metres hurdles – 14.1h (1956)
