= Rigoberto Pérez =

Mexican pole vaulter

Medal record

Men's athletics

Representing Mexico

Central American and Caribbean Games
Gold medal – first place	1938 Panama	Pole vault

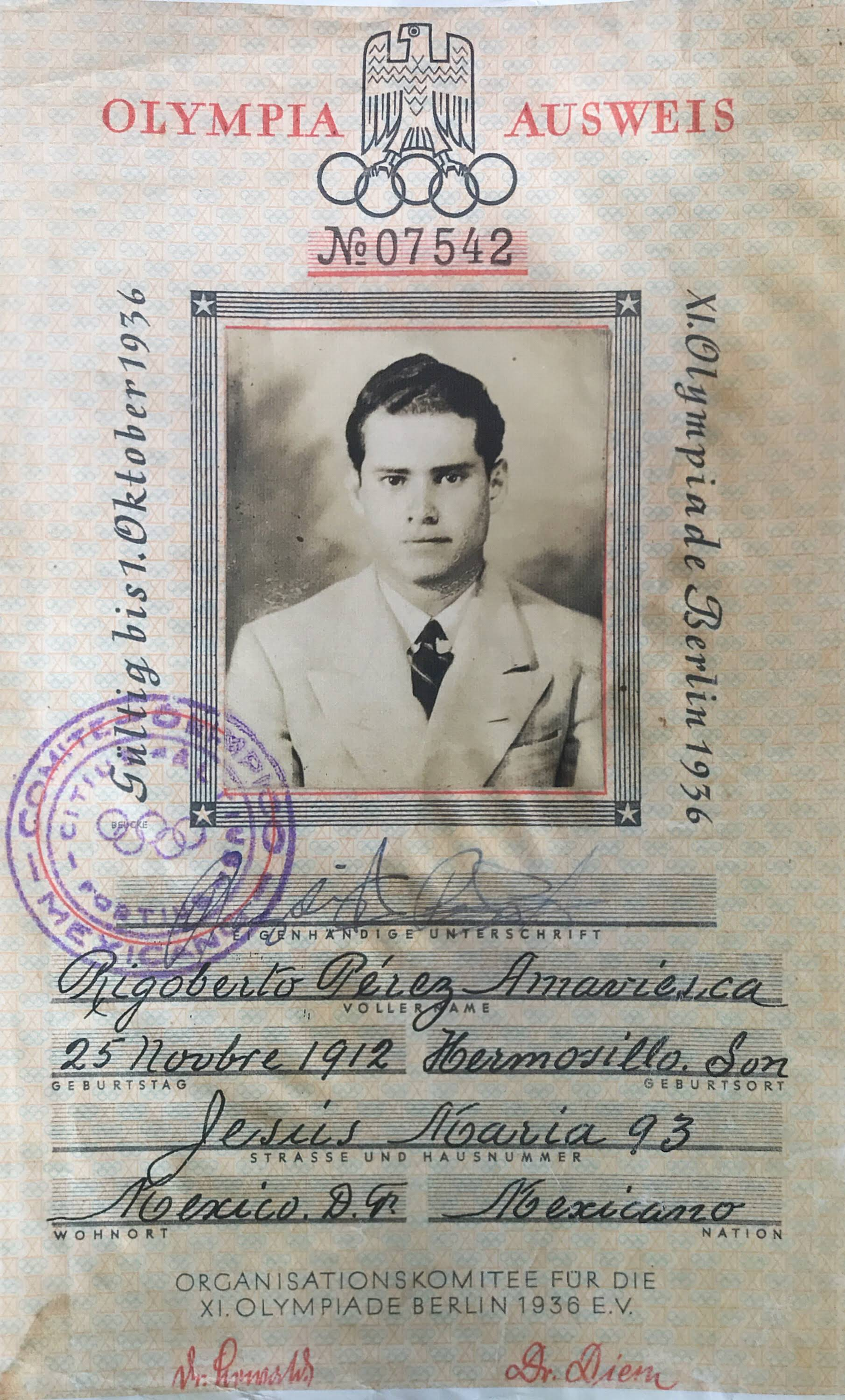
Rigoberto Pérez Identity Card for Berlin 1936 Olympic Games

Rigoberto Pérez Amavisca (born 26 November 1912, date of death unknown) was a Mexican pole vaulter who competed in the 1936 Summer Olympics. His personal best in pole vaulting is 4.10 m set in 1939.
