= Athletics at the 1955 Pan American Games – Men's 110 metres hurdles =

Men's 110 metres hurdles at the Pan American Games

The men's 110 metres hurdles event at the 1955 Pan American Games was held at the Estadio Universitario in Mexico City on 16 and 17 March.

== Medalists ==
Gold	Silver	Bronze
Jack Davis; United States	Keith Gardner; Jamaica	Evaristo Iglesias; Cuba

== Results ==
=== Heats ===
Wind:
Heat 1: 0.0 m/s, Heat 2: +2.9 m/s

Rank	Heat	Name	Nationality	Time	Notes
1	1	Keith Gardner	Jamaica	14.61	Q
2	1	Samuel Anderson	Cuba	14.67	Q
3	1	Teófilo Davis	Venezuela	15.44	Q
4	1	Guillermo Zapata	Colombia	15.65	
	1	Willard Thompson	United States	DNS	
1	2	Jack Davis	United States	13.92	Q
2	2	Evaristo Iglesias	Cuba	14.83	Q
3	2	Wilson Carneiro	Brazil	15.22	Q

=== Final ===
Wind: 0.0 m/s

Rank	Name	Nationality	Time	Notes
1st place, gold medalist(s)	Jack Davis	United States	14.44	
2nd place, silver medalist(s)	Keith Gardner	Jamaica	14.74	
3rd place, bronze medalist(s)	Evaristo Iglesias	Cuba	14.94	
4	Samuel Anderson	Cuba	14.95	
5	Teófilo Davis	Venezuela	15.33	
6	Wilson Carneiro	Brazil	16.65	
