= Carlos Monges =

Mexican sprinter

Personal information
- Full name: Carlos Monges Caldera
- Born: 14 March 1926 Mexico City, Mexico
- Died: 2 February 1988 (aged 61) Ciudad Juárez, Mexico
- Height: 1.80 m (5 ft 11 in)
- Weight: 66 kg (146 lb)

Sport
- Sport: Sprinting
- Events: 400 metres, 400 metres hurdles

Carlos Monges Caldera (14 March 1926 – 2 February 1988) was a Mexican sprinter. He competed in the men's 400 metres at the 1948 Summer Olympics.

== International competitions ==
Year	Competition	Venue	Position	Event	Notes
Representing Mexico
1948	Olympic Games	London, United Kingdom	38th (h)	400 m	50.9
1950	Central American and Caribbean Games	Guatemala City, Guatemala	3rd	400 m hurdles	57.3
1951	Pan American Games	Buenos Aires, Argentina	9th (sf)	400 m	49.8
1951	Pan American Games	Buenos Aires, Argentina	11th (h)	400 m hurdles	56.4
1951	Pan American Games	Buenos Aires, Argentina	5th	4 × 400 m relay	NT

== Personal bests ==
- 400 metres – 48.4h (1951)
