= Samuel Andersón =

Cuban hurdler (1929–2012)

Personal information
- Full name: Samuel Aurelio Andersón Schweyer
- Born: 25 September 1929 Matanzas, Cuba
- Died: 18 August 2012 (aged 82) Riverview, Florida, U.S.
- Height: 171 cm (5 ft 7 in)
- Weight: 78 kg (172 lb)

Samuel Aurelio Andersón Schweyer (Note: In this Spanish name, the first or paternal surname is Andersón and the second or maternal family name is Schweyer.) (25 September 1929 – 18 August 2012) was a Cuban hurdler who competed in the 1952 Summer Olympics. A specialist in the 110 metres hurdles, he won a silver medal at the 1950 Central American and Caribbean Games, bronze medal at the 1951 Pan American Games, and gold medal in the 1954 Central American and Caribbean Games.

== International competitions ==
Year	Competition	Venue	Position	Event	Notes
Representing Cuba
1950	Central American and Caribbean Games	Guatemala City, Guatemala	2nd	110 m hurdles	15.2
1950	Central American and Caribbean Games	Guatemala City, Guatemala	4th	400 m hurdles	57.4
1951	Pan American Games	Buenos Aires, Argentina	3rd	110 m hurdles	14.2
1951	Pan American Games	Buenos Aires, Argentina	6th	400 m hurdles	NT
1951	Pan American Games	Buenos Aires, Argentina	4th	4 × 400 m relay	3:20.0
1952	Olympic Games	Helsinki, Finland	15th (h)	110 m hurdles	15.24
1952	Olympic Games	Helsinki, Finland	8th (sf)	4 × 100 m relay	41.67
1954	Central American and Caribbean Games	Mexico City, Mexico	1st	110 m hurdles	14.3
1955	Pan American Games	Mexico City, Mexico	4th	110 m hurdles	14.95
