= Jaime Annexy =

Puerto Rican hammer thrower (1927–2000)

Personal details
- Born: December 11, 1927 Mayagüez, Puerto Rico
- Died: August 8, 2000 (aged 72) San Juan, Puerto Rico

Military service
- Allegiance: United States of America
- Branch/service: United States Marine Corps
- Years of service: 1952-1954
- Rank: Private first class
- Battles/wars: Korean War

Jaime Annexy Fajardo (11 December 1927 in Mayagüez, Puerto Rico – 8 August 2000 in San Juan, Puerto Rico), also known as Jaime Ramirez Fajardo, was a Puerto Rican hammer thrower who competed in the 1952 Summer Olympics. Jaime Annexy Fajardo served in the United States Marine Corps during the Korean War, he competed in the 1952 Summer Olympics as a U.S. Marine stationed at Camp Pendleton, California. Lived in Puerto Rico after college until 1977, settled in Florida, and established Eureka Insurance Brokers. Jaime Annexy Fajardo was buried at the Puerto Rico Memorial Cemetery in Carolina, Puerto Rico.

== International competitions ==
Year	Competition	Venue	Position	Event	Notes
Representing Puerto Rico
1950	Central American and Caribbean Games	Guatemala City, Guatemala	1st	Hammer throw	45.87 m
1952	Olympic Games	Helsinki, Finland	–	Hammer throw	NM
1954	Central American and Caribbean Games	Mexico City, Mexico	2nd	Hammer throw	46.82 m
