= Hyacinth Walters =

Jamaican sprinter(born 1926)

Hyacinth Maude Walters (born 15 July 1926) is a Jamaican former sprinter who competed in the 1952 Summer Olympics.

== International competitions ==
Year	Competition	Venue	Position	Event	Notes
Representing Jamaica
1946	Central American and Caribbean Games	Barranquilla, Colombia	3rd	50 m	6.8
1946	Central American and Caribbean Games	Barranquilla, Colombia	2nd	4 × 100 m relay	50.1
1950	Central American and Caribbean Games	Guatemala City, Guatemala	1st	60 m	6.7
1950	Central American and Caribbean Games	Guatemala City, Guatemala	1st	100 m	12.3
1950	Central American and Caribbean Games	Guatemala City, Guatemala	1st	4 × 100 m relay	48.9
1952	Olympic Games	Helsinki, Finland	21st (h)	100 m	12.53
1952	Olympic Games	Helsinki, Finland	19th (h)	200 m	25.59
1954	Central American and Caribbean Games	Mexico City, Mexico	2nd	100 m	12.34
1954	Central American and Caribbean Games	Mexico City, Mexico	2nd	4 × 100 m relay	48.34

== Personal bests ==
- 100 metres – 11.8h (1952)
- 200 metres – 25.59 (1952)
