= Graviola Ewing =

Guatemalan sprinter (1930–2020)

Personal information
- Full name: Lydia Graviola Ewing
- Nationality: Guatemalan
- Born: 6 September 1930 Puerto Barrios, Guatemala
- Died: 27 March 2020 (aged 89) Virginia, United States

Sport
- Sport: Sprinting
- Event: 100 metres

Lydia Graviola Ewing (later Burgess, Andino; 6 September 1930 – 27 March 2020) was a Guatemalan sprinter. She competed in the women's 100 metres at the 1952 Summer Olympics. She was the first woman to represent Guatemala at the Olympics.

== International competitions ==
| Year | Competition | Venue | Position | Event | Notes |
Representing Guatemala
| 1950 | Central American and Caribbean Games | Guatemala City, Guatemala | 3rd | 60 m | 6.9 |
| 1950 | Central American and Caribbean Games | Guatemala City, Guatemala | 3rd | 100 m | 12.5 |
| 1950 | Central American and Caribbean Games | Guatemala City, Guatemala | 2nd | 4 × 100 m relay | 52.0 |
| 1951 | Pan American Games | Buenos Aires, Argentina | 15th (h) | 100 m | 13.5 |
| 1951 | Pan American Games | Buenos Aires, Argentina | – (h) | 200 m | DQ |
| 1952 | Olympic Games | Helsinki, Finland | 44th (h) | 100 m | 13.05 |
| 1952 | Olympic Games | Helsinki, Finland | 36th (h) | 200 m | 27.02 |

== Personal bests ==
- 100 metres – 12.50 (1954)
