= Nola Thorne =

Personal information
- Born: c.1919 Panama

Sport
- Country: Panama
- Sport: Athletics
Medal record
Athletics
Representing Panama
Central American and Caribbean Games
Gold medal – first place	1938 Panama City	100m
Gold medal – first place	1938 Panama City	80m hurdles
Gold medal – first place	1938 Panama City	4×100m relay

Nola Thorne (born c.1919) was a Panamanian track and field athlete. She was known as one of the most memorable women to have emerged from the country of Panama mainly due to her achievement of clinching 3 gold medals at the inaugural edition of the Central American and Caribbean Games in 1938.

Thorne claimed gold medals in the women's 100m, sprint hurdles and 4×100m relay events during the 1938 Central American and Caribbean Games.
