= Lloyd LaBeach =

Panamanian sprinter and long jumper

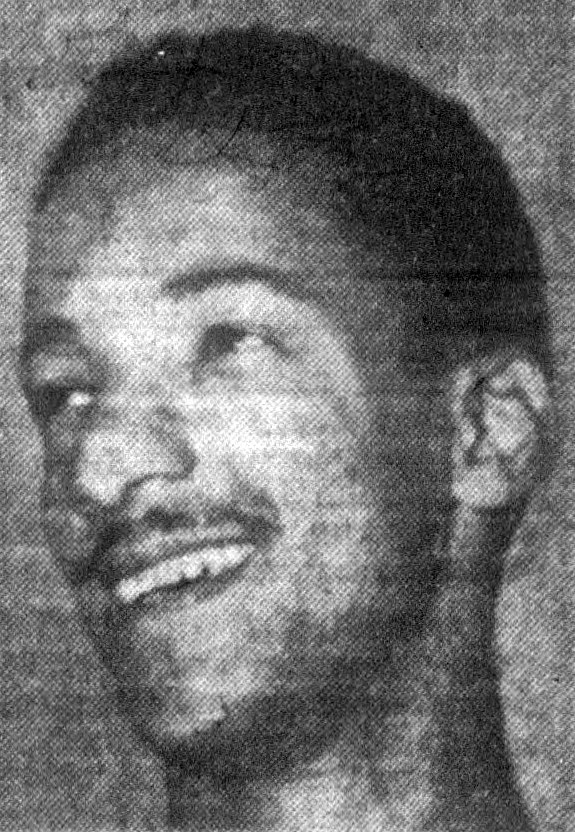
- LaBeach, circa 1950

Medal record

Men's athletics

Representing Panama

Olympic Games
| Bronze medal – third place | 1948 London | 100 metres |
| Bronze medal – third place | 1948 London | 200 metres |

Bolivarian Games
| Gold medal – first place | 1947/8 Lima | 100 metres |
| Gold medal – first place | 1947/8 Lima | 200 metres |
| Gold medal – first place | 1947/8 Lima | Long jump |

Lloyd Barrington LaBeach (28 June 1922 – 19 February 1999) was a Panamanian sprinter, who won two bronze medals during the 1948 Summer Olympics, the first Olympic medals for Panama and for Central America. He also competed in the long jump.

In the 100 meters, he finished behind American athletes Harrison Dillard and Barney Ewell for third place, ahead of favorite Mel Patton, also from the United States.

Born in Panama City, his parents were Jamaican immigrants. While Lloyd was still in school the family relocated to Jamaica, where LaBeach first showed his talent in athletics. He later entered the University of California, Los Angeles, where he was coached during his preparations for the Olympic Games.

LaBeach competed for the Wisconsin Badgers track and field team in the NCAA.

In 1948, he set the world record in the 200 meters on a cinder track in Compton, California. After the race, he was described in Time as "Panama's one-man Olympic hope". Just a few weeks before LaBeach had been involved in a world record setting 100-yard dash, in which he barely lost at the finish line tape to Patton. These 1948 performances made him one of the expected medal contenders against Patton and Ewell in the Olympics. His brother Byron LaBeach, also a sprinter, competed in the 1952 Summer Olympics representing Jamaica.

LaBeach retired from athletics in 1957, and died in New York City, on 19 February 1999, at the age of 76.

== Competition record ==
| Year | Competition | Venue | Position | Event | Notes |
Representing Panama
| 1946 | Central American and Caribbean Games | Barranquilla, Colombia | 2nd | 200 m | 21.7 |
| 1946 | Central American and Caribbean Games | Barranquilla, Colombia | 1st | 4 × 100 m relay | 43.0 |
| 1946 | Central American and Caribbean Games | Barranquilla, Colombia | 1st | Long jump | 6.96 m |
| 1947 | Bolivarian Games | Lima, Peru | 1st | 100 m | 10.5 |
| 1947 | Bolivarian Games | Lima, Peru | 1st | 200 m | 21.0 |
| 1947 | Bolivarian Games | Lima, Peru | 1st | 4 × 100 m relay | 41.6 |
| 1947 | Bolivarian Games | Lima, Peru | 1st | Long jump | 6.99 m |
| 1948 | Olympic Games | London, United Kingdom | 3rd | 100 m | 10.6 |
| 1948 | Olympic Games | London, United Kingdom | 3rd | 200 m | 21.2 |
| 1950 | Central American and Caribbean Games | Guatemala City, Guatemala | 3rd | 100 m | 10.5 (w) |
| 1950 | Central American and Caribbean Games | Guatemala City, Guatemala | 3rd | 200 m | 21.2 (w) |
| 1950 | Central American and Caribbean Games | Guatemala City, Guatemala | 3rd | 4 × 100 m relay | 42.0 |
| 1950 | Central American and Caribbean Games | Guatemala City, Guatemala | 1st | 4 × 400 m relay | 3:17.2 |
