= Cynthia Thompson =

Jamaican sprinter (1923–2019)

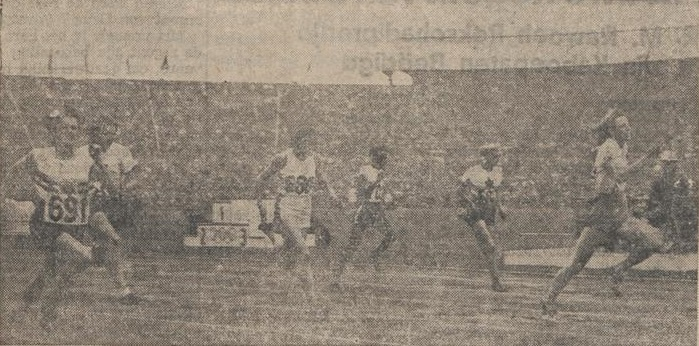
- Thompson in the 100m final of the 1948 Summer Olympics

Personal information
- Born: Cynthia Annabelle Thompson; 29 November 1923 Kingston, Jamaica
- Died: 8 March 2019 (aged 95) Kingston, Jamaica

Sport
- Sport: Sprinting

Cynthia Annabelle Thompson (29 November 1923 – 8 March 2019) was a Jamaican sprinter. She was born in Kingston, Jamaica

== Life and career ==
She was one of four female athletes who represented Jamaica at its first Olympic Games, the 1948 Summer Olympics. Following her athletics career, she became a paediatrician and retired in 2000.

== Personal life ==
While she was travelling with her teammates on the boat to London, she got seasickness and loss some weight before the competition.

== Death ==
Thompson passed away on March 8, 2019 at the age of 95.

== International competitions ==
Year	Competition	Venue	Position	Event	Notes
Representing Jamaica
1946	Central American and Caribbean Games	Barranquilla, Colombia	2nd	50 m	6.5
1946	Central American and Caribbean Games	Barranquilla, Colombia	1st	100 m	12.1
1946	Central American and Caribbean Games	Barranquilla, Colombia	2nd	4 × 100 m relay	50.1
1948	Olympic Games	London, United Kingdom	6th	100 m	12.87
1948	Olympic Games	London, United Kingdom	8th (sf)	200 m	25.67
1950	Central American and Caribbean Games	Guatemala City, Guatemala	2nd	60 m	6.8
1950	Central American and Caribbean Games	Guatemala City, Guatemala	2nd	100 m	12.4
1950	Central American and Caribbean Games	Guatemala City, Guatemala	1st	4 × 100 m relay	48.9
1954	Central American and Caribbean Games	Mexico City, Mexico	4th	100 m	12.4
1954	Central American and Caribbean Games	Mexico City, Mexico	2nd	4 × 100 m relay	48.34
