= Athletics at the 1951 Pan American Games – Men's 110 metres hurdles =

Men's 110 metres hurdles at the Pan American Games

The men's 110 metres hurdles event at the 1951 Pan American Games was held at the Estadio Monumental in Buenos Aires on 2 and 3 March.

== Medalists ==
Gold	Silver	Bronze
Dick Attlesey; United States	Estanislao Kocourek; Argentina	Samuel Anderson; Cuba

== Results ==
=== Heats ===
Rank	Heat	Name	Nationality	Time	Notes
1	1	Dick Attlesey	United States	14.3	Q
2	1	Estanislao Kocourek	Argentina	14.5	Q
3	1	Hernán Alzamora	Peru	15.1	
4	1	Juan Leiva	Venezuela	16.0	
1	2	Samuel Anderson	Cuba	14.7	Q
2	2	Don Halderman	United States	14.8	Q
3	2	Jörn Gevert	Chile	15.4	
4	2	Carlos Zorich	Argentina	16.0	
1	3	Wilson Carneiro	Brazil	15.0	Q
2	3	Vicente Tavarez	Mexico	15.1	Q
3	3	Teófilo Davis	Venezuela	15.4	
4	3	Eduardo Laca	Peru	15.4	
5	3	Rubén Díaz	Argentina	??.?	

=== Final ===
Rank	Name	Nationality	Time	Notes
1st place, gold medalist(s)	Dick Attlesey	United States	14.0	
2nd place, silver medalist(s)	Estanislao Kocourek	Argentina	14.2	
3rd place, bronze medalist(s)	Samuel Anderson	Cuba	14.2	
4	Don Halderman	United States	14.3	
5	Wilson Carneiro	Brazil	14.7	
6	Vicente Tavarez	Mexico	??.?	
