= Téofilo Colón =

Puerto Rican hurdler (1914–2004)

Personal information
- Full name: Téofilo Colón Molinaris
- Nationality: Puerto Rican
- Born: 20 September 1914 Guayama, Puerto Rico
- Died: 31 January 2004 (aged 89) Carolina, Puerto Rico

Sport
- Sport: Track and field
- Event: 110 metres hurdles

Téofilo Colón Molinaris (20 September 1914 – 31 January 2004) was a Puerto Rican hurdler. He competed in the men's 110 metres hurdles at the 1952 Summer Olympics. Colón was the flag bearer for Puerto Rico in the 1976 Summer Olympics opening ceremony.

== International competitions ==
Year	Competition	Venue	Position	Event	Notes
Representing Puerto Rico
1950	Central American and Caribbean Games	Guatemala City, Guatemala	4th	110 m hurdles	15.5
1952	Olympic Games	Helsinki, Finland	19th (h)	110 m hurdles	15.48
1959	Central American and Caribbean Games	Caracas, Venezuela	2nd	110 m hurdles	15.95
1960	Ibero-American Games	Santiago, Chile	8th (h)	110 m hurdles	15.5
1962	Central American and Caribbean Games	Kingston, Jamaica	12th (h)	110 m hurdles	15.6

== Personal bests ==
- 110 metres hurdles – 14.6h (1944)
