= Estanislao Kocourek =

Argentine hurdler (born 1930)

Personal information
- Full name: Estanislao Francisco Kocourek Pochily
- Born: 5 March 1930 (age 96) Buenos Aires, Argentina
- Height: 1.79 m (5 ft 10 in)
- Weight: 60 kg (132 lb)

Sport
- Sport: Track and field
- Event: 110 metres hurdles

Estanislao Francisco Kocourek Pochily (born 5 March 1930) is an Argentine hurdler. He competed in the men's 110 metres hurdles at the 1952 Summer Olympics.

== International competitions ==
Year	Competition	Venue	Position	Event	Notes
Representing Argentina
1949	South American Championships	Lima, Peru	10th (h)	110 m hurdles	15.9
1951	Pan American Games	Buenos Aires, Argentina	2nd	110 m hurdles	14.2
1952	South American Championships	Buenos Aires, Argentina	2nd	110 m hurdles	15.0
1952	Olympic Games	Helsinki, Finland	13th (h)	110 m hurdles	15.20
1953	South American Championships (unofficial)	Santiago, Chile	1st	110 m hurdles	14.7
1953	International University Sports Week	Dortmund, West Germany	2nd	110 m hurdles	14.7
1953	International University Sports Week	Dortmund, West Germany	1st	4 × 100 m relay	42.2
1956	South American Championships	Santiago, Chile	2nd	110 m hurdles	14.9
1958	South American Championships	Montevideo, Uruguay	4th	110 m hurdles	15.1
1959	South American Championships (unofficial)	São Paulo, Brazil	3rd	110 m hurdles	15.2

== Personal bests ==
- 110 metres hurdles – 14.2h (Buenos Aires 1951)
