= Carmen Phipps =

Jamaican high jumper

Personal information
- Full name: Carmen Lilith Phipps
- Born: 9 October 1927 (age 99) Kingston, Colony of Jamaica, British Empire

Sport
- Sport: Athletics
- Event: High jump

Carmen Lilith Phipps (later Laing; born 9 October 1927) is a Jamaican athlete. She competed in the women's high jump at the 1948 Summer Olympics.

After her retirement from athletics, she married fellow Jamaican athlete Les Laing and moved to the United States.

== International competitions ==
Year	Competition	Venue	Position	Event	Notes
Representing Jamaica
1946	Central American and Caribbean Games	Barranquilla, Colombia	1st	High jump	1.54 m
1948	Olympic Games	London, United Kingdom	11th	High jump	1.50 m
1950	Central American and Caribbean Games	Guatemala City, Guatemala	2nd	High jump	1.59 m

== Personal bests ==
- High jump – 1.609 metres (1948)
