= Luis Velásquez (runner) =

Guatemalan long-distance runner

Personal information
- Full name: Luis Humberto Velásquez
- Born: 30 December 1919 Guatemala City, Guatemala
- Died: 9 February 1997 (aged 77) Middlesex County, Massachusetts, United States
- Height: 1.70 m (5 ft 7 in)
Medal record
Men's Athletics
Representing Guatemala
Pan American Games
Gold medal – first place	1955 Mexico City	Marathon

Luis Humberto Velásquez (30 December 1919 – 9 February 1997) was a Guatemalan long-distance runner who competed in the 1952 Summer Olympics. He was third in the 1951 Pan American Games marathon and third in the 1955 Pan American Games marathon.

== International competitions ==
Year	Competition	Venue	Position	Event	Notes
Representing Guatemala
1946	Central American and Caribbean Games	Barranquilla, Colombia	2nd	Half marathon	1:14:39
1950	Central American and Caribbean Games	Guatemala City, Guatemala	4th	5000 m	16:32.6
1950	Central American and Caribbean Games	Guatemala City, Guatemala	1st	10,000 m	34:33.6
1950	Central American and Caribbean Games	Guatemala City, Guatemala	1st	Half marathon	1:14:44
1951	Pan American Games	Buenos Aires, Argentina	3rd	Marathon	2:46:03
1952	Olympic Games	Helsinki, Finland	31st	10,000 m	35:34.0
1952	Olympic Games	Helsinki, Finland	22nd	Marathon	DNF
1955	Pan American Games	Mexico City, Mexico	3rd	Marathon	3:05:26

== Personal bests ==
- Marathon – 2:33:28 (1952)
