= Wilfred Tull =

Trinidad and Tobago athletics competitor

Wilfred Oliver "Coach" Tull (born 5 October 1917 in Brasso, Trinidad and Tobago, died January 2003 in Albuquerque, New Mexico, U.S.) was a Track and field athlete from Trinidad and Tobago, a representative in the United Nations and a long-time coach for professional and amateur athletes.

He was a member of the Trinidad and Tobago team at the 1948 Summer Olympics in London. He competed in both the men's 800 meters and 1500 meters and was the first athlete to represent his country in these games.

After his professional athletic career, Coach spent 20 years working with the United Nations. While living in NY, Coach was a founding member of the renowned New York Road Runners Club, along with future Hollywood Actor Roscoe Lee Brown.

After retiring from the UN, Coach moved to Albuquerque with his wife and family in 1976. Though retired, Coach spent the majority of his time devoted to local athletes.
