= José Barbosa (pole vaulter) =

Puerto Rican pole vaulter

José "Joe" Celso Barbosa Muñiz (1 April 1929 in San Juan, Puerto Rico – 14 February 2015 in Palm Harbor, Florida) was a Puerto Rican pole vaulter who competed in the 1948 Summer Olympics.

His personal best in the event was 4.06 metres set in 1954.

== International competitions ==
Year	Competition	Venue	Position	Notes
Representing Puerto Rico
1946	Central American and Caribbean Games	Barranquilla, Colombia	2nd	3.84 m
1948	Olympic Games	London, United Kingdom	9th	3.95 m
1950	Central American and Caribbean Games	Guatemala City, Guatemala	2nd	3.78 m
1954	Central American and Caribbean Games	Mexico City, Mexico	1st	4.05 m
