= Doroteo Guamuch Flores Stadium =

Stadium in Guatemala City

Coordinates: 14°37′32.75″N 90°30′37.76″W

Estadio Doroteo Guamuch Flores
- El Coloso de la Zona 5 "The Colossus of Zone 5"
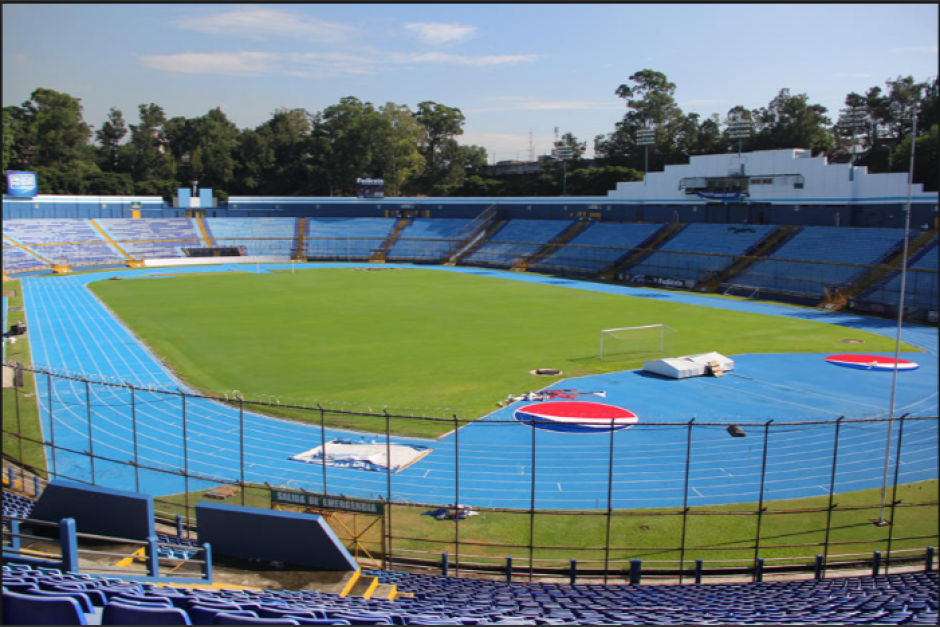
- Interactive map of Estadio Doroteo Guamuch Flores
- Full name: Estadio Nacional Doroteo Guamuch Flores
- Former names: Estadio Olímpico de la Revolución (1950–1959); Estadio Nacional Mateo Flores (1959–2016)
- Location: Guatemala City, Guatemala
- Operator: CDAG
- Capacity: 26,116
- Executive suites: 20
- Surface: GrassMaster
- Record attendance: 82,000 (1950 Central American and Caribbean Games - Guatemala vs Mexico, 10 March 1950)
- Field size: 105 m × 71 m (344 ft × 233 ft)

Construction
- Built: 1948
- Opened: August 18, 1950
- Renovated: 2025–present
- Cost: Q 1.500.000
- Architect: Juan de Dios Aguilar

Tenants
- Guatemala (1950–present); Comunicaciones (2018–2024); Municipal (1950–1991, 2005)

The Doroteo Guamuch Flores Stadium (Spanish: Estadio Doroteo Guamuch Flores) is a multi-use national stadium in Guatemala City, the largest venue in Guatemala. It was built in 1948, to host the Central American and Caribbean Games in 1950, and was renamed after long-distance runner Doroteo Guamuch Flores, winner of the 1952 Boston Marathon. It has a capacity of 26,000 seats.

Used mostly for football (soccer) matches, the stadium has hosted the majority of the home matches of the Guatemala national football team throughout its history, and was the home of local football club Comunicaciones. The venue is operated by the Confederación Deportiva Autónoma de Guatemala (CDAG).

One of the worst disasters ever to occur in a sports venue took place at the stadium in 1996, when 83 people were killed because of a human avalanche on the stands.

== General description ==
The grass field of the Doroteo Guamuch Flores is surrounded by an eight-lane athletic track, which originally was made of sand, and later remodeled to have a synthetic tartan surface. The seating area is divided into five sections: Palco (located on the west, and the only section under roof), Tribuna (west, surrounding the Palco), Preferencia (east), General Norte (north), and General Sur (south, where the main entrance is located).

== History ==
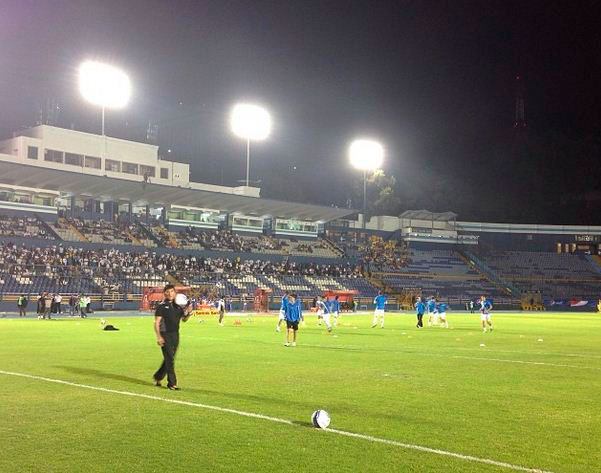
Training in the Estadio Doroteo Guamuch

The stadium was built in 1948, as part of the project to build a group of sports facilities known as Ciudad Olímpica, in the Zone 5 of the Guatemalan Capital. Originally named Estadio Olímpico – erroneously, since it has never hosted an olympic competition –, it is primarily constructed of reinforced concrete, which is why sometimes it is colloquially referred to as Coloso de Concreto. It was inaugurated on February 23, 1950, to host the VI Central American and Caribbean Games, at which local runner Doroteo Guamuch won the half marathon event, and on 26 February, the Guatemala national football team played against Colombia, winning the match 2-1, thus inaugurating the football events at the stadium.

After Doroteo Guamuch's triumph in the 1952 Boston Marathon, the Guatemalan government renamed the stadium after the name he was internationally known by, Mateo Flores, in recognition to his local and international achievements. Since then, the stadium has also been colloquially called El Mateo. On August 9, 2016, the Congress decreed that the stadium be renamed Doroteo Guamuch Flores, Mateo Flores' birth name.

On 18 January 1959 the stadium hosted a friendly football match between CSD Comunicaciones and Santos FC, the latter having Pelé as part of its squad. Santos took a 2-0 lead with goals by Pelé and Pepe, and nine minutes before the match ended, Francisco "Pinula" Contreras scored the 2-1. On 20 August 1960 Spanish giants Real Madrid visited Guatemala and played an exhibition match against Comunicaciones, winning 5-0.

In 1973 the stadium hosted the first Central American Games (Juegos Deportivos Centroamericanos), and has since been the venue for other two editions, in 1986 and 2001.

In July 1996, the sand track was upgraded to a tartan track, and the first time the new surface was used, local athlete Berner Rodas set a new national record at the 1500 metres event.

Throughout the years, the stadium has also been the usual finishing point of the annual Vuelta a Guatemala, Central America's largest single road cycling competition.

Numerous concerts have been hosted at the stadium, notably heavy metal band Metallica's performance in 2010.

== See also ==
- Lists of stadiums
