= Francisco González (athlete) =

Mexican hammer thrower (born 1917)

Medal record

Men's athletics

Representing Mexico

Central American and Caribbean Games
Silver medal – second place	1938 Panama	Hammer throw

Francisco González Suaste (born 2 May 1917, date of death unknown) was a Mexican hammer thrower who competed in the 1948 Summer Olympics. Gonzalez is deceased.
