= Kathleen Russell (athlete) =

Jamaican sprinter

Personal information
- Full name: Kathleen May Russell
- Nationality: Jamaican
- Born: 31 August 1927
- Died: 27 August 1969 (aged 41)

Sport
- Sport: Sprinting
- Event: 100 metres

Kathleen May Russell (married Williams; 31 August 1927 – 27 August 1969) was a Jamaican sprinter. She competed in the women's 100 metres at the 1948 Summer Olympics.

== International competitions ==
Year	Competition	Venue	Position	Event	Notes
Representing Jamaica
1946	Central American and Caribbean Games	Barranquilla, Colombia	3rd	80 m hurdles	12.7
1948	Olympic Games	London, United Kingdom	15th (sf)	100 m	13.08
1948	Olympic Games	London, United Kingdom	3rd (h)	200 m	26.3
1948	Olympic Games	London, United Kingdom	6th	Long jump	5.495 m
1950	Central American and Caribbean Games	Guatemala City, Guatemala	4th	100 m	12.8
1950	Central American and Caribbean Games	Guatemala City, Guatemala	3rd	80 m hurdles	12.6
1950	Central American and Caribbean Games	Guatemala City, Guatemala	1st	4 × 100 m relay	48.9
1952	Olympic Games	Helsinki, Finland	31st (q)	Long jump	5.10 m
1954	Central American and Caribbean Games	Mexico City, Mexico	2nd	80 m hurdles	12.5
1954	Central American and Caribbean Games	Mexico City, Mexico	2nd	4 × 100 m relay	48.34
1954	Central American and Caribbean Games	Mexico City, Mexico	1st	High jump	1.50 m
