= 1946 Central American and Caribbean Games =

5th edition of the Central American and Caribbean Games

Central American and Caribbean Sports Games
- Host city: Barranquilla
- Country: Colombia
- Edition: 5th
- Athletes: 1,540
- Opening: 5 March 1946
- Closing: 25 March 1946
- Opened by: Mariano Ospina Pérez
- Torch lighter: Joaquín Bolívar
- Main venue: Estadio Olímpico Municipal

The fifth Central American and Caribbean Games were held in Barranquilla, Colombia, from 5 March to 25 March 1946. These games featured 1,540 athletes from thirteen nations, competing in seventeen sports.

== Sports ==
- Athletics
- Baseball
- Basketball
- Basque Pelota
- Boxing
- Cycling
- Diving
- Fencing
- Football
- Golf
- Artistic gymnastics
- Shooting
- Softball
- Swimming
- Tennis
- Volleyball
- Water polo
- Weightlifting
- Wrestling
- Additional events: Fine arts, chess, billiards

== Medal table ==
Place	Nation	1st place, gold medalist(s)	2nd place, silver medalist(s)	3rd place, bronze medalist(s)	Total
1	Cuba	29	26	23	78
2	Mexico	26	22	28	76
3	Panama	13	17	10	40
4	Puerto Rico	9	8	7	24
5	Jamaica	6	11	9	26
6	Colombia	5	8	3	16
7	Trinidad and Tobago	4	3	5	12
8	Dominican Republic	4	2	1	7
9	Venezuela	3	3	5	11
10	Netherlands Antilles	3	1	2	6
11	Guatemala	2	3	4	8
12	Costa Rica	2	0	1	3
13	El Salvador	1	3	3	7
Total		107	107	100	314
