= 1950 Central American and Caribbean Games =

6th edition of the Central American and Caribbean Games

Central American and Caribbean Sports Games
- Host city: Guatemala City, Guatemala
- Edition: 6th
- Athletes: 1,390
- Opening: 26 February 1950
- Closing: 12 March 1950

The sixth Central American and Caribbean Games were held in Guatemala City, Guatemala, from February 28 to March 12, 1950. The games included 1,390 athletes from fourteen nations, competing in nineteen sports.

== Sports ==
- Athletics
- Baseball
- Basketball
- Bowling
- Boxing
- Cycling
- Diving
- Equestrian
- Fencing
- Football
- Golf
- Artistic gymnastics
- Shooting
- Swimming
- Tennis
- Volleyball
- Water polo
- Weightlifting
- Wrestling

== Medal table ==
Place	Nation	1st place, gold medalist(s)	2nd place, silver medalist(s)	3rd place, bronze medalist(s)	Total
1	Mexico	43	24	26	93
2	Cuba	24	27	28	79
3	Puerto Rico	12	7	10	29
4	Jamaica	10	10	3	23
5	Guatemala	9	25	25	59
6	Panama	8	9	10	27
7	Netherlands Antilles	3	2	1	6
8	Colombia	2	4	4	10
9	El Salvador	2	4	3	9
10	Trinidad and Tobago	1	2	1	4
11	Nicaragua	1	0	1	8
12	Haiti	0	1	0	1
13	Honduras	0	0	2	2
14	Costa Rica	0	0	1	1
Total		115	115	115	345
