= Athletics at the 1959 Pan American Games – Men's 100 metres =

Men's 100 metres at the Pan American Games

The men's 100 metres event at the 1959 Pan American Games was held at the Soldier Field in Chicago on 28 and 29 August.

== Medalists ==
Gold	Silver	Bronze
Ray Norton; United States	Mike Agostini; British West Indies	Enrique Figuerola; Cuba

== Results ==
=== Heats ===
Held on 28 August

Wind:
Heat 1: 0.0 m/s, Heat 2: 0.0 m/s, Heat 3: 0.0 m/s, Heat 4: 0.0 m/s

Rank	Heat	Name	Nationality	Time	Notes
1	1	Ray Norton	United States	10.6	Q
2	1	Clive Bonas	Venezuela	10.6	Q
3	1	Santiago Plaza	Mexico	10.7	Q
4	1	Enrique Figuerola	Cuba	10.7	Q
5	1	Lynn Eves	Canada	10.8	
6	1	Heber Etcheverry	Uruguay	10.8	
7	1	Ramón Vega	Puerto Rico	10.9	
	1	Roland Romain	Haiti	DNS	
1	2	Robert Poynter	United States	10.7	Q
2	2	José da Conceição	Brazil	10.9	Q
3	2	Wilton Jackson	British West Indies	10.9	Q
4	2	Harry Jerome	Canada	10.9	Q
5	2	Alberto Torres	Dominican Republic	10.9	
6	2	José Carrera	Ecuador	??.?	
7	2	Horacio Esteves	Venezuela	??.?	
	2	Eduardo Krumm	Chile	DNS	
1	3	Dennis Johnson	British West Indies	10.8	Q
2	3	Bill Woodhouse	United States	10.8	Q
3	3	João Pires Sobrinho	Brazil	10.9	Q
4	3	Rubén Díaz	Puerto Rico	10.9	Q
5	3	Lázaro Aristides Betancourt	Cuba	11.0	
6	3	Lionel James	Dominican Republic	??.?	
7	3	George Short	Canada	11.2	
8	3	Arturo Isasmondi	Uruguay	??.?	
1	4	Mike Agostini	British West Indies	10.8	Q
2	4	Rafael Romero	Venezuela	10.8	Q
3	4	Manuel Rivera	Puerto Rico	10.9	Q
4	4	Luis Vienna	Argentina	10.9	Q
5	4	Jorge de Barros	Brazil	10.9	
6	4	Salvador Rivas	Dominican Republic	??.?	
7	4	Gerardo di Tolla	Peru	??.?	
8	4	Arturo Flores	Ecuador	??.?	

=== Semifinals ===
Held on 29 August

Wind:
Heat 1: +4.1 m/s, Heat 2: +2.9 m/s

Rank	Heat	Name	Nationality	Time	Notes
1	1	Ray Norton	United States	10.2	Q
2	1	Mike Agostini	British West Indies	10.2	Q
3	1	Rafael Romero	Venezuela	10.3	Q
4	1	Santiago Plaza	Mexico	10.5	Q
5	1	Manuel Rivera	Puerto Rico	10.5	
6	1	João Pires Sobrinho	Brazil	10.6	
7	1	Wilton Jackson	British West Indies	10.6	
8	1	Luis Vienna	Argentina	10.8	
1	2	Robert Poynter	United States	10.5	Q
2	2	Bill Woodhouse	United States	10.5	Q
3	2	Enrique Figuerola	Cuba	10.5	Q
4	2	Dennis Johnson	British West Indies	10.5	Q
5	2	José da Conceição	Brazil	10.7	
6	2	Clive Bonas	Venezuela	10.7	
7	2	Harry Jerome	Canada	10.7	
8	2	Rubén Díaz	Puerto Rico	10.9	

=== Final ===
Held on 29 August

Wind: +2.7 m/s

Rank	Name	Nationality	Time	Notes
1st place, gold medalist(s)	Ray Norton	United States	10.3	
2nd place, silver medalist(s)	Mike Agostini	British West Indies	10.4	
3rd place, bronze medalist(s)	Enrique Figuerola	Cuba	10.5	
4	Robert Poynter	United States	10.5	
5	Dennis Johnson	British West Indies	10.6	
6	Rafael Romero	Venezuela	10.6	
7	Bill Woodhouse	United States	10.7	
8	Santiago Plaza	Mexico	10.8	
