= Athletics at the 1959 Pan American Games – Men's 200 metres =

Men's 200 metres at the Pan American Games

The men's 200 metres event at the 1959 Pan American Games was held at the Soldier Field in Chicago on 30 and 31 August.

== Medalists ==
Gold	Silver	Bronze
Ray Norton; United States	Les Carney; United States	Mike Agostini; British West Indies

== Results ==
=== Heats ===
Held on 30 August

Rank	Heat	Name	Nationality	Time	Notes
1	1	Ray Norton	United States	21.9	Q
2	1	Mike Agostini	British West Indies	21.9	Q
3	1	Manuel Rivera	Puerto Rico	22.0	Q
4	1	Jorge de Barros	Brazil	22.1	
5	1	Gordon Thorlaksson	Canada	22.1	
6	1	Alberto Torres	Dominican Republic	??.?	
	1	Emilio Romero	Venezuela	DNS	
1	2	Ramón Vega	Puerto Rico	21.8	Q
2	2	Basil Ince	British West Indies	21.8	Q
3	2	Rafael Romero	Venezuela	21.9	Q
4	2	Luis Vienna	Argentina	21.9	
5	2	George Short	Canada	22.7	
6	2	Salvador Rivas	Dominican Republic	23.0	
7	2	Arturo Flores	Ecuador	??.?	
1	3	Vance Robinson	United States	21.6	Q
2	3	Wilton Jackson	British West Indies	21.9	Q
3	3	José da Conceição	Brazil	22.0	Q
4	3	Enrique Figuerola	Cuba	22.2	
5	3	Lloyd Murad	Venezuela	??.?	
	3	Heber Etcheverry	Uruguay	DNS	
	3	Iván Rodríguez	Puerto Rico	DNS	
1	4	Les Carney	United States	21.6	Q
2	4	Harry Jerome	Canada	22.1	Q
3	4	Santiago Plaza	Mexico	22.2	Q
4	4	João Pires Sobrinho	Brazil	22.2	
5	4	Lionel James	Dominican Republic	22.9	
6	4	Eduardo Krumm	Chile	23.4	
	4	Arturo Isasmondi	Uruguay	DNS	

=== Semifinals ===
Held on 30 August

Rank	Heat	Name	Nationality	Time	Notes
1	1	Ramón Vega	Puerto Rico	21.4	Q
2	1	Mike Agostini	British West Indies	21.5	Q
3	1	Vance Robinson	United States	21.5	Q
4	1	Rafael Romero	Venezuela	21.5	
5	1	Harry Jerome	Canada	21.8	
6	1	Santiago Plaza	Mexico	22.0	
1	2	Ray Norton	United States	21.1	Q
2	2	Basil Ince	British West Indies	21.4	Q
3	2	Les Carney	United States	21.5	Q
4	2	Wilton Jackson	British West Indies	21.9	
5	2	Manuel Rivera	Puerto Rico	21.9	
	2	José da Conceição	Brazil	DNS	

=== Final ===
Held on 31 August

Rank	Name	Nationality	Time	Notes
1st place, gold medalist(s)	Ray Norton	United States	20.6	
2nd place, silver medalist(s)	Les Carney	United States	21.1	
3rd place, bronze medalist(s)	Mike Agostini	British West Indies	21.1	
4	Vance Robinson	United States	21.1	
5	Ramón Vega	Puerto Rico	21.3	
6	Basil Ince	British West Indies	21.6	
