= Athletics at the 1959 Pan American Games – Men's 4 × 100 metres relay =

Men's 4 × 100 metres relay at the Pan American Games

The men's 4 × 100 metres relay event at the 1959 Pan American Games was held at the Soldier Field in Chicago on 2 September.

== Medallists ==
Gold	Silver	Bronze
United States; Hayes Jones; Robert Poynter; William Woodhouse; Ray Norton	Venezuela; Emilio Romero; Lloyd Murad; Clive Bonas; Rafael Romero	British West Indies; Dennis Johnson; Clifton Bertrand; Wilton Jackson; Mike Agostini

== Results ==
=== Heats ===
Rank	Heat	Nation	Athletes	Time	Notes
1	1	United States	Hayes Jones, Robert Poynter, William Woodhouse, Ray Norton	40.1	Q
2	1	Venezuela	Emilio Romero, Lloyd Murad, Clive Bonas, Rafael Romero	41.1	Q
3	1	Brazil	Affonso da Silva, Paulo da Fonseca, Jorge de Barros, José da Conceição	41.3	Q
4	1	Cuba	Lázaro Betancourt, Evaristo Iglesias, Emigdio Torres, Enrique Figuerola	42.5	
5	1	Dominican Republic	Alberto Torres, Domingo García, Salvador Rivas, Lionel James	43.1	
1	2	British West Indies	Dennis Johnson, Clifton Bertrand, Wilton Jackson, Mike Agostini	42.1	Q
2	2	Canada	Lynn Eves, George Short, Gordon Thorlaksson, Harry Jerome	42.1	Q
3	2	Puerto Rico	Manuel Rivera, Iván Rodríguez, Ramón Vega, Rubén Díaz	43.0	Q
	2	Ecuador		DNS	

=== Final ===
Rank	Nation	Athletes	Time	Notes
1st place, gold medalist(s)	United States	Hayes Jones, Robert Poynter, William Woodhouse, Ray Norton	40.4	
2nd place, silver medalist(s)	Venezuela	Emilio Romero, Lloyd Murad, Clive Bonas, Rafael Romero	41.1	
3rd place, bronze medalist(s)	British West Indies	Dennis Johnson, Clifton Bertrand, Wilton Jackson, Mike Agostini	41.1	
4	Brazil	Affonso da Silva, Paulo da Fonseca, Jorge de Barros, José da Conceição	41.6	
5	Puerto Rico	Manuel Rivera, Iván Rodríguez, Ramón Vega, Rubén Díaz	41.7	
6	Canada	Lynn Eves, George Short, Gordon Thorlaksson, Harry Jerome	41.9	
