= Alberto Torres (athlete) =

Dominican sprinter

Personal information
- Full name: Alberto Sebastian Torres de la Mota
- Nationality: Dominican
- Born: 20 February 1934 Concepción de la Vega, Dominican Republic
- Died: 16 April 1999 (aged 65) Santo Domingo, Dominican Republic

Sport
- Sport: Sprinting
- Event: 100 metres

Alberto Sebastian Torres de la Mota (20 February 1934 – 16 April 1999) was a Dominican sprinter. Torres would first compete at the 1959 Pan American Games though would not medal in his events. He would then compete as the sole athlete for Dominican Republic at the 1964 Summer Olympics and would be the first Dominican Olympic competitor and flagbearer. At the games, he would compete in the men's 100 metres and would not advance further from the heats.

He would then compete at the 1968 Summer Olympics in the men's 100 metres, men's 200 metres, and as part of the men's 4 × 100 metres relay team. Though he did not medal in the events, he was designated as the torch bearer and lighter for the 1974 Central American and Caribbean Games and was inducted to the Dominican Sports Hall of Fame five years later.

== Biography ==
Alberto Sebastian Torres de la Mota was born on 20 February 1934 in Concepción de la Vega, Dominican Republic. He would compete as the sole athlete for Dominican Republic at the 1964 Summer Olympics in Tokyo and would be the first Dominican Olympic competitor at any edition of the games. Prior to the games, he would set a personal best in the 200 metres with a time of 21.4 seconds in 1959. In the same year, he would compete at the 1959 Pan American Games in Chicago in the men's 100 metres, men's 200 metres, and men's 4 × 100 metres relay, not medaling in any of the events.

Torres would be designated as the flag bearer for the nation at the opening ceremony. He would compete in the heats of the men's 100 metres on 14 October. He raced against seven other competitors and placed sixth with a time of 10.9 seconds. He would not advance to the quarterfinals.

He also competed at the 1968 Summer Olympics in Mexico City. He would first compete in the heats of the men's 100 metres on 13 October. He had placed sixth out of seven athletes with a time of a wind-aided 10.7 seconds. Although he competed, he was listed as a non-starter in the Official Report but was included in the Official Results. Torres' next event would be the heats of the men's 200 metres on 15 October. He would run in a time of 21.9 seconds and placed fifth out of the eight people in his heat, he would not advance to the finals.

He would also be part of the Dominican men's 4 × 100 metres relay team with Porfirio Veras, Rafael Domínguez, and Luis Soriano. They would compete in the heats on 19 October and finished with a time of 41.48 seconds, placing last out of the seven teams in their heat, and not advancing further. After the games, he would be designated as the torch bearer and lighter for the 1974 Central American and Caribbean Games in Santo Domingo. Five years later, he was inducted to the Dominican Sports Hall of Fame. Torres would later die on 16 April 1999 in Santo Domingo at the age of 65.

== International competitions ==
Year	Competition	Venue	Position	Event	Notes
Representing the Dominican Republic
1959	Pan American Games	Chicago, United States	12th (h)	100 m	10.9
1959	Pan American Games	Chicago, United States	6th (h)	200 m	NT
1959	Pan American Games	Chicago, United States	8th (h)	4 × 100 m relay	43.1
1962	Central American and Caribbean Games	Kingston, Jamaica	14th (h)	100 m	10.8
1962	Central American and Caribbean Games	Kingston, Jamaica	15th (h)	200 m	22.1
1962	Ibero-American Games	Madrid, Spain	13th (h)	100 m	11.1
1962	Ibero-American Games	Madrid, Spain	13th (h)	200 m	22.7
1964	Olympic Games	Tokyo, Japan	50th (h)	100 m	10.9
1966	Central American and Caribbean Games	San Juan, Puerto Rico	6th (sf)	100 m	10.6
1966	Central American and Caribbean Games	San Juan, Puerto Rico	18th (h)	200 m	22.7
1966	Central American and Caribbean Games	San Juan, Puerto Rico	5th	4 × 100 m relay	41.0
1968	Olympic Games	Mexico City, Mexico	42nd (h)	200 m	21.99
1968	Olympic Games	Mexico City, Mexico	18th (h)	4 × 100 m relay	41.4
1970	Central American and Caribbean Games	Panama City, Panama	6th	4 × 100 m relay	41.7
