= Iván Rodríguez (sprinter) =

Puerto Rican sprinter

Iván Rodríguez Padilla (15 January 1937 – 13 August 2022) was a Puerto Rican sprinter who competed in the 1956 Summer Olympics and in the 1960 Summer Olympics. He was born in Yauco, Puerto Rico. He finished third in the 1959 Pan American Games 4×400 metres Relay (with Ramón Vega, Frank Rivera, and the non-Olympian Cains). In the 1959 Pan American Games 400 metres Rodríguez finished fifth.

== International competitions ==
Year	Competition	Venue	Position	Event	Notes
Representing Puerto Rico
1956	Olympic Games	Melbourne, Australia	19th (qf)	200 m	22.16
1956	Olympic Games	Melbourne, Australia	12th (sf)	400 m	47.86
1956	Olympic Games	Melbourne, Australia	12th (h)	4 × 400 m relay	3:13.8
1959	Central American and Caribbean Games	Caracas, Venezuela	5th	200 m	22.4
1959	Central American and Caribbean Games	Caracas, Venezuela	2nd	400 m	48.93
1959	Central American and Caribbean Games	Caracas, Venezuela	1st	4 × 400 m relay	3:16.91
1959	Pan American Games	Chicago, United States	5th	400 m	47.0
1959	Pan American Games	Chicago, United States	5th	4 × 100 m relay	41.7
1959	Pan American Games	Chicago, United States	3rd	4 × 400 m relay	3:12.4
1960	Olympic Games	Rome, Italy	44th (h)	400 m	49.6

== Personal bests ==
- 200 metres – 21.1h (1959)
- 400 metres – 46.5h y (1958)
