= Frank Rivera =

Frank Rivera is the name of:

- Frank Rivera (athlete) (1928–2013), Puerto Rican sprinter and middle-distance runner
- Frank Rivera (artist) (born 1939), American painter
- Frank G. Rivera (born 1948), Filipino playwright and actor
