= Santiago Plaza =

Mexican sprinter

Personal information
- Full name: Santiago Plaza Yagüe
- Nationality: Mexican
- Born: 23 April 1938 (age 88) Spain
- Height: 1.76 m (5 ft 9 in)
- Weight: 74 kg (163 lb)

Sport
- Sport: Sprinting
- Event: 100 metres

Santiago Plaza Yagüe (born 23 April 1938) is a Mexican sprinter. He competed in the men's 100 metres at the 1960 Summer Olympics.

== International competitions ==
Year	Competition	Venue	Position	Event	Notes
Representing Mexico
1959	Central American and Caribbean Games	Caracas, Venezuela	5th	100 m	10.9
1959	Central American and Caribbean Games	Caracas, Venezuela	4th	200 m	22.4
1959	Pan American Games	Chicago, United States	8th	100 m	10.8
1959	Pan American Games	Chicago, United States	11th (sf)	200 m	22.0
1960	Olympic Games	Rome, Italy	24th (qf)	100 m	10.8
1960	Olympic Games	Rome, Italy	37th (h)	200 m	22.0
1962	Central American and Caribbean Games	Kingston, Jamaica	11th (sf)	100 m	10.9
1962	Central American and Caribbean Games	Kingston, Jamaica	12th (h)	200 m	22.0
1962	Central American and Caribbean Games	Kingston, Jamaica	7th (h)	4 × 100 m relay	42.0^{1}

^{1}Disqualified in the final

== Personal bests ==
- 100 metres – 10.3h (1960)
- 200 metres – 20.6h (1960)
