= Athletics at the 1959 Pan American Games – Men's 4 × 400 metres relay =

Men's 4 × 400 metres relay at the Pan American Games

The men's 4 × 400 metres relay event at the 1959 Pan American Games was held at the Soldier Field in Chicago on 1 and 2 September.

== Medallists ==
Gold	Silver	Bronze
British West Indies; Mal Spence; Mel Spence; Basil Ince; George Kerr	United States; Eddie Southern; Josh Culbreath; Jack Yerman; Dave Mills	Puerto Rico; Ramón Vega; Jossué Delgado; Manuel Rivera; Iván Rodríguez

== Results ==
=== Heats ===
Rank	Heat	Nation	Athletes	Time	Notes
1	1	United States	Eddie Southern, Josh Culbreath, Jack Yerman, Dave Mills	3:13.6	Q
2	1	Canada	Stan Worsfold, George Shepherd, Allan Andrews, Harry Jerome	3:18.8	Q
3	1	Mexico	José Heredia, Gonzalo Gonzáles, Jorge Terán, Juan Cruz	3:21.8	Q
4	1	Ecuador	José Carrera, Juan Arailio, José Rendón, Arturo Jiménez	3:27.6	
1	2	British West Indies	Mal Spence, Mel Spence, Basil Ince, George Kerr	3:15.0	Q
2	2	Puerto Rico	Ramón Vega, Jossué Delgado, Manuel Rivera, Iván Rodríguez	3:15.1	Q
3	2	Brazil	Argemiro Roque, João Pires Sobrinho, Anubes da Silva, Ulysses dos Santos	3:16.1	Q
4	2	Venezuela	Victor Flores, Guillermo Rocca, Hortensio Fucil, Emilio Romero	3:17.8	

=== Final ===
Rank	Nation	Athletes	Time	Notes
1st place, gold medalist(s)	British West Indies	Mal Spence, Mel Spence, Basil Ince, George Kerr	3:05.3	
2nd place, silver medalist(s)	United States	Eddie Southern, Josh Culbreath, Jack Yerman, Dave Mills	3:05.8	
3rd place, bronze medalist(s)	Puerto Rico	Ramón Vega, Jossué Delgado, Manuel Rivera, Iván Rodríguez	3:12.4	
4	Brazil	Argemiro Roque, João Pires Sobrinho, Anubes da Silva, Ulysses dos Santos	3:16.1	
5	Mexico	José Heredia, Gonzalo Gonzáles, Jorge Terán, Juan Cruz	3:18.0	
6	Canada	Stan Worsfold, Allan Andrews, Harry Jerome, George Shepherd	3:18.3	
