= Athletics at the 1960 Summer Olympics – Men's 200 metres =

Men's 200 metres at the Games of the XVII Olympiad
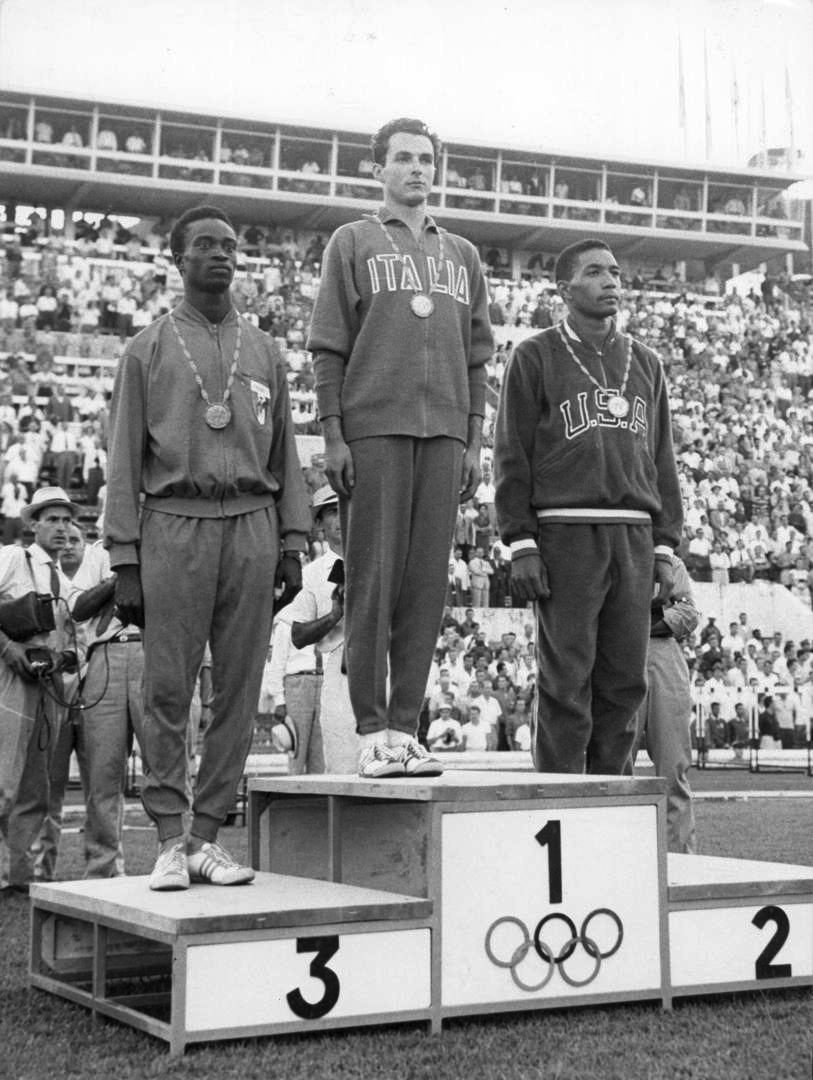
- Abdoulaye Seye, Livio Berruti and Lester Carney
- Venue: Olympic Stadium
- Dates: 2–3 September 1960
- Competitors: 62 from 47 nations
- Winning time: 20.5 =WR

Medalists
1st place, gold medalist(s)		Livio Berruti; Italy
2nd place, silver medalist(s)		Lester Carney; United States
3rd place, bronze medalist(s)		Abdoulaye Seye; France

The men's 200 metres was held on 2 September and 3 September as part of the athletics at the 1960 Summer Olympics, which were held in Rome. 74 athletes from 54 nations entered, but only 62 athletes from 47 nations ultimately competed. The maximum number of athletes per nation had been set at 3 since the 1930 Olympic Congress. The event was won by 0.1 seconds by Livio Berruti of Italy, the first victory in the event by a nation outside of North America and snapping a five-Games winning streak (and two-Games medal sweep streak) by the United States. The Americans finished with a silver medal, by Lester Carney, to extend their medal streak to six Games. Abdoulaye Seye of France took bronze. Berruti's gold and Seye's bronze were the first medal for their nations in the men's 200 metres.

== Background ==
This was the 13th appearance of the event, which was not held at the first Olympics in 1896 but has been on the program ever since. One of the six finalists from the 1956 Games returned: sixth-place finisher José da Conceição of Brazil. The favorite was American Ray Norton, the 1959 and 1960 AAU champion and 1959 Pan American Games winner. Italian Livio Berruti was the only man who had defeated Norton in any 200 metres race in 1959, and the home crowd in Rome hoped for a medal from him.

Afghanistan, the British West Indies, Fiji, Ghana, Kenya, and Morocco each made their debut in the event. The United States made its 13th appearance, the only nation to have competed at each edition of the 200 metres to date.

== Competition format ==
The competition used the four round format introduced in 1920: heats, quarterfinals, semifinals, and a final. A significant change, however, was the introduction of the "fastest loser" system. Previously, advancement depended solely on the runners' place in their heat. The 1960 competition added advancement places to the fastest runners across the heats in the first round who did not advance based on place.

There were 12 heats of between 5 and 6 runners each (before withdrawals), with the top 2 men in each advancing to the quarterfinals along with the next 3 fastest overall. The quarterfinals consisted of 4 heats of 6 or 7 athletes each; the 3 fastest men in each heat advanced to the semifinals. There were 2 semifinals, each with 6 runners. In that round, the top 3 athletes advanced. The final had 6 runners. The races were run on a 400 metre track.

== Records ==
Prior to the competition, the existing world and Olympic records were as follows.

World record	Stone Johnson (USA)	20.5	Stanford, United States	2 July 1960
Olympic record	Bobby Morrow (USA)	20.6	Melbourne, Australia	27 November 1956

Livio Berruti's hand-timed 20.5 seconds in the semifinal equalled the world record and set a new Olympic record; he equalled this time in the Final.

== Schedule ==
All times are Central European Time (UTC+1)

Date	Time	Round
Friday, 2 September 1960	9:00; 15:20	Heats; Quarterfinals
Saturday, 3 September 1960	15:45; 18:00	Semifinals; Final

== Results ==
=== Heats ===
The top two runners in each of the 12 heats advanced, as well as the next three fastest runners from across all heats.

==== Heat 1 ====
Rank	Athlete	Nation	Time (hand)	Time (automatic)	Notes
1	Paul Genevay	France	21.2	21.33	Q
2	Vadym Arkhypchuk	Soviet Union	21.5	21.67	Q
3	James Omagbemi	Nigeria	26.2	26.40	
—	Iftikhar Shah	Pakistan	DNS	–	
—	Abebe Hailou	Ethiopia	DNS	–	
—	Enrique Figuerola	Cuba	DNS	–	

==== Heat 2 ====
Rank	Athlete	Nation	Time (hand)	Time (automatic)	Notes
1	Les Carney	United States	21.1	21.31	Q
2	David Segal	Great Britain	21.3	21.48	Q
3	Peter Laeng	Switzerland	21.6	21.75	
4	Shahrudin Mohamed Ali	Malaya	22.3	22.40	
—	Hilmar Thorbjörnsson	Iceland	DNS	–	
—	Armin Hary	United Team of Germany	DNS	–	

==== Heat 3 ====
Rank	Athlete	Nation	Time (hand)	Time (automatic)	Notes
1	Stone Johnson	United States	21.7	21.81	Q
2	Nikolaos Georgopoulos	Greece	22.0	22.18	Q
3	Clayton Glasgow	Guyana	22.6	22.75	
4	James Roberts	Liberia	23.1	23.22	
—	Harry Jerome	Canada	DNS	–	
—	Suthi Manyakass	Thailand	DNS	–	

==== Heat 4 ====
Rank	Athlete	Nation	Time (hand)	Time (automatic)	Notes
1	Marcel Wendelin	United Team of Germany	21.6	21.71	Q
2	Leonid Bartenev	Soviet Union	21.8	21.89	Q
3	Michael Okantey	Ghana	21.8	21.91	
4	Santiago Plaza	Mexico	22.0	22.17	
5	Huang Suh-Chuang	Formosa	22.9	23.08	
6	Abdul Khaliq	Pakistan	23.1	23.24	

==== Heat 5 ====
Rank	Athlete	Nation	Time (hand)	Time (automatic)	Notes
1	Peter Radford	Great Britain	21.1	21.25	Q
2	Erasmus Amukun	Uganda	21.3	21.38	Q
3	Csaba Csutorás	Hungary	21.7	21.90	
4	Sitiveni Moceidreke	Fiji	21.8	21.97	
5	Elmar Kunauer	Austria	22.2	22.34	
—	Emmanuel Putu	Liberia	DNS	–	

==== Heat 6 ====
Rank	Athlete	Nation	Time (hand)	Time (automatic)	Notes
1	Ray Norton	United States	21.2	21.27	Q
2	David Jones	Great Britain	21.2	21.29	Q
3	Yuriy Konovalov	Soviet Union	21.4	21.50	q
4	Ramón Vega	Puerto Rico	21.8	21.94	
5	Patrick Lowry	Ireland	22.1	22.30	
—	Vilém Mandlík	Czechoslovakia	DNF	–	

==== Heat 7 ====
Rank	Athlete	Nation	Time (hand)	Time (automatic)	Notes
1	Livio Berruti	Italy	21.0	21.14	Q
2	Tom Robinson	Bahamas	21.4	21.56	Q
3	Lloyd Murad	Venezuela	21.8	21.86	
4	Pentti Rekola	Finland	22.2	22.27	
5	Bouchaib El-Maachi	Morocco	22.3	22.34	
—	Jalal Gozal	Indonesia	DNS	–	

==== Heat 8 ====
Rank	Athlete	Nation	Time (hand)	Time (automatic)	Notes
1	Dennis Johnson	British West Indies	21.2	21.36	Q
2	José da Conceição	Brazil	21.3	21.48	Q
3	Sebald Schnellmann	Switzerland	21.4	21.59	q
4	Jean-Pierre Barra	Belgium	22.3	22.43	
5	Enrique Bautista	Philippines	23.0	23.16	
6	Ali Yusuf Zaid	Afghanistan	23.1	23.22	

==== Heat 9 ====
Rank	Athlete	Nation	Time (hand)	Time (automatic)	Notes
1	Abdoulaye Seye	France	21.1	21.21	Q
2	Carl Fredrik Bunæs	Norway	21.3	21.46	Q
3	Clifton Bertrand	British West Indies	21.3	21.51	q
4	Amos Grodzinowsky	Israel	21.8	21.99	
5	Barry Robinson	New Zealand	22.2	22.35	
6	Lennart Jonsson	Sweden	22.3	22.41	

==== Heat 10 ====
Rank	Athlete	Nation	Time (hand)	Time (automatic)	Notes
1	Marian Foik	Poland	21.1	21.28	Q
2	Jocelyn Delecour	France	21.3	21.48	Q
3	Armando Sardi	Italy	21.6	21.81	
4	Lynn Eves	Canada	21.9	21.02	
5	Mikhail Bachvarov	Bulgaria	22.2	22.36	
6	Roger Bofferding	Luxembourg	23.2	23.36	

==== Heat 11 ====
Rank	Athlete	Nation	Time (hand)	Time (automatic)	Notes
1	Seraphino Antao	Kenya	21.3	21.44	Q
2	Rafael Romero	Venezuela	21.4	21.60	Q
3	Manfred Germar	United Team of Germany	21.6	21.76	
4	Romain Poté	Belgium	22.1	22.27	
5	Melanio Asensio	Spain	22.3	22.45	
6	Aydin Onur	Turkey	22.5	22.61	

==== Heat 12 ====
Rank	Athlete	Nation	Time (hand)	Time (automatic)	Notes
1	Edward Jefferys	South Africa	21.1	21.18	Q
2	Salvatore Giannone	Italy	21.5	21.61	Q
3	Kimitada Hayase	Japan	22.3	22.44	
4	Falih Fahmi	Iraq	22.6	22.77	
5	Dennis Tipping	Australia	22.9	23.09	
—	Milkha Singh	India	DNS	–	

=== Quarterfinals ===
The first three in each quarterfinal qualified for the semifinals.

==== Quarterfinal 1 ====
Wind: 0.0 m/s

Rank	Athlete	Nation	Time (hand)	Time (automatic)	Notes
1	Stone Johnson	United States	20.9	21.08	Q
2	Edward Jefferys	South Africa	21.1	21.22	Q
3	Tom Robinson	Bahamas	21.2	21.32	Q
4	Erasmus Amukun	Uganda	21.3	21.47	
5	Yuriy Konovalov	Soviet Union	21.3	21.52	
6	Clifton Bertrand	British West Indies	21.4	21.57	
7	Rafael Romero	Venezuela	21.4	21.58	

==== Quarterfinal 2 ====
Wind: 0.0 m/s

Rank	Athlete	Nation	Time (hand)	Time (automatic)	Notes
1	Abdoulaye Seye	France	20.8	20.95	Q
2	Ray Norton	United States	21.0	21.14	Q
3	David Segal	Great Britain	21.1	21.21	Q
4	Seraphino Antao	Kenya	21.3	21.43	
5	Vadym Arkhypchuk	Soviet Union	21.5	21.58	
6	José da Conceição	Brazil	21.5	21.63	
7	Nikolaos Georgopoulos	Greece	22.0	22.15	

==== Quarterfinal 3 ====
Wind: 0.0 m/s

Rank	Athlete	Nation	Time (hand)	Time (automatic)	Notes
1	Les Carney	United States	20.9	21.06	Q
2	Peter Radford	Great Britain	21.0	21.12	Q
3	Dennis Johnson	British West Indies	21.1	21.25	Q
4	Jocelyn Delecour	France	21.5	21.64	
5	Leonid Bartenev	Soviet Union	21.5	21.65	
6	Sebald Schnellmann	Switzerland	21.5	21.66	
7	Salvatore Giannone	Italy	21.8	21.95	

==== Quarterfinal 4 ====
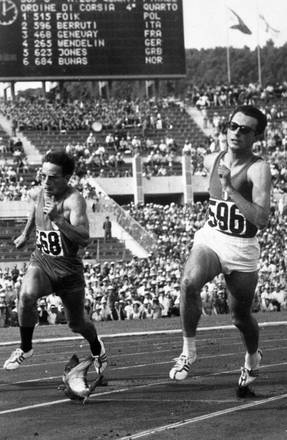
Paul Genevay and Livio Berruti in quarterfinal 4, interrupted by a pigeon

Wind: 0.0 m/s

Rank	Athlete	Nation	Time (hand)	Time (automatic)	Notes
1	Livio Berruti	Italy	20.8	20.91	Q
2	Marian Foik	Poland	20.9	21.02	Q
3	Paul Genevay	France	21.1	21.26	Q
4	David Jones	Great Britain	21.2	21.33	
5	Carl Fredrik Bunæs	Norway	21.4	21.50	
6	Marcel Wendelin	United Team of Germany	21.6	21.71	

=== Semifinals ===
The first three in each semifinal qualified for the final.

==== Semifinal 1 ====
Rank	Athlete	Nation	Time (hand)	Time (automatic)	Notes
1	Abdoulaye Seye	France	20.8	21.00	Q
2	Marian Foik	Poland	21.0	21.15	Q
3	Les Carney	United States	21.1	21.24	Q
4	Edward Jefferys	South Africa	21.3	21.46	
5	Tom Robinson	Bahamas	21.5	21.67	
—	David Segal	Great Britain	DSQ	–	

==== Semifinal 2 ====
Berruti tied the world record of 20.5 seconds.

Rank	Athlete	Nation	Time (hand)	Time (automatic)	Notes
1	Livio Berruti	Italy	20.5	20.65	Q, =WR
2	Ray Norton	United States	20.7	20.81	Q
3	Stone Johnson	United States	20.8	20.93	Q
4	Peter Radford	Great Britain	20.9	21.04	
5	Dennis Johnson	British West Indies	21.0	21.16	
6	Paul Genevay	France	21.0	21.17	

=== Final ===
Berruti tied again the world record of 20.5 seconds

Wind: 0.0 m/s

Rank	Athlete	Nation	Time (hand)	Time (automatic)	Notes
1st place, gold medalist(s)	Livio Berruti	Italy	20.5	20.62	=WR
2nd place, silver medalist(s)	Les Carney	United States	20.6	20.69	
3rd place, bronze medalist(s)	Abdoulaye Seye	France	20.7	20.83	
4	Marian Foik	Poland	20.8	20.90	
5	Stone Johnson	United States	20.8	20.93	
6	Ray Norton	United States	20.9	21.09	
