= Athletics at the 1955 Pan American Games – Men's 400 metres =

Men's 400 metres at the Pan American Games

The men's 400 metres event at the 1955 Pan American Games was held at the Estadio Universitario in Mexico City on 17 and 18 March.

== Medalists ==
Gold	Silver	Bronze
Lou Jones; United States	Jim Lea; United States	Jesse Mashburn; United States

== Results ==
=== Heats ===
Held on 17 March

Rank	Heat	Name	Nationality	Time	Notes
1	1	Lou Jones	United States	47.66	Q, GR
2	1	Mel Spence	Jamaica	47.86	Q
3	1	Evaristo Eddie	Venezuela	47.94	Q
4	1	Jorge Terán	Mexico	48.78	
5	1	Ovidio de Jesús	Puerto Rico	49.97	
1	2	Guillermo Gutiérrez	Venezuela	48.31	Q
2	2	Argemiro Roque	Brazil	48.62	Q
3	2	Allan Moore	Jamaica	48.83	Q
4	2	Pablo Salinas	Mexico	49.57	
5	2	Cyril Johnson	Bahamas	51.62	
	2	Angel García	Cuba	DNF	
1	3	Jim Lea	United States	48.93	Q
2	3	Frank Rivera	Puerto Rico	48.94	Q
3	3	Dick Harding	Canada	49.27	Q
4	3	Evelio Planas	Cuba	49.47	
1	4	Jesse Mashburn	United States	50.59	Q
2	4	Waldemiro Monteiro	Brazil	53.90	Q

=== Semifinals ===
Held on 17 March

Rank	Heat	Name	Nationality	Time	Notes
1	1	Lou Jones	United States	47.10	Q, GR
2	1	Jim Lea	United States	47.69	Q
3	1	Evaristo Eddie	Venezuela	47.91	Q
4	1	Allan Moore	Jamaica	48.34	
5	1	Argemiro Roque	Brazil	48.55	
1	2	Jesse Mashburn	United States	47.51	Q
2	2	Frank Rivera	Puerto Rico	48.01	Q
3	2	Mel Spence	Jamaica	48.09	Q
4	2	Dick Harding	Canada	48.28	
5	2	Guillermo Gutiérrez	Venezuela	48.61	
6	2	Waldemiro Monteiro	Brazil	49.66	

=== Final ===
Held on 18 March

Rank	Lane	Name	Nationality	Time	Notes
1st place, gold medalist(s)	5	Lou Jones	United States	45.68	WR
2nd place, silver medalist(s)	7	Jim Lea	United States	45.78	
3rd place, bronze medalist(s)	6	Jesse Mashburn	United States	46.44	
4	3	Frank Rivera	Puerto Rico	48.37	
5	2	Mel Spence	Jamaica	48.84	
	4	Evaristo Eddie	Venezuela	DNF	
