= Jorge Terán =

Mexican sprinter (1935–2015)

Personal information
- Full name: Jorge Terán Hernández
- Nationality: Mexican
- Born: 22 March 1935 Tampico, Mexico
- Died: January 2015 (aged 89)
- Height: 1.78 m (5 ft 10 in)
- Weight: 74 kg (163 lb)

Sport
- Sport: Sprinting
- Event: 400 metres

Jorge Terán Hernández (22 March 1935 – January 2015) was a Mexican sprinter. He competed in the men's 400 metres at the 1960 Summer Olympics.

== International competitions ==
Year	Competition	Venue	Position	Event	Notes
Representing Mexico
1955	Pan American Games	Mexico City, Mexico	6th (h)	400 m	48.78
1955	Pan American Games	Mexico City, Mexico	7th	4 × 400 m relay	3:21.42
1959	Central American and Caribbean Games	Caracas, Venezuela	5th (h)	400 m	49.9
1959	Central American and Caribbean Games	Caracas, Venezuela	3rd	4 × 400 m relay	3:24.46
1959	Pan American Games	Chicago, United States	19th (h)	400 m	50.8
1959	Pan American Games	Chicago, United States	5th	4 × 400 m relay	3:18.0
1960	Olympic Games	Rome, Italy	44th (h)	400 m	49.6
1962	Central American and Caribbean Games	Kingston, Jamaica	7th (sf)	400 m	48.7
1962	Central American and Caribbean Games	Kingston, Jamaica	7th (h)	4 × 100 m relay	42.0^{1}
1962	Central American and Caribbean Games	Kingston, Jamaica	6th	4 × 400 m relay	3:22.9

^{1}Disqualified in the final

== Personal bests ==
- 400 metres – 47.6h (1963)
