= Athletics at the 1962 Central American and Caribbean Games – Results =

These are the results of the athletics competition at the 1962 Central American and Caribbean Games which took place between 18 and 25 June 1962, at the National Stadium in Kingston, Jamaica.

== Men's results ==
=== 100 metres ===
Heats – 18 August

Rank	Heat	Name	Nationality	Time	Notes
1	1	Arquímedes Herrera	Venezuela	10.3	Q, =GR
2	1	Enrique Figuerola	Cuba	10.4	Q
3	1	George Collie	Bahamas	10.7	Q
4	1	Miguel González	Mexico	10.9	
5	1	Irving Josephs	Trinidad and Tobago	11.1	
6	1	Wellesley Clayton	Jamaica	11.1	
7	1	José Polio	El Salvador	11.6	
1	2	Dennis Johnson	Jamaica	10.5	Q
2	2	Santiago Plaza	Mexico	10.6	Q
3	2	Harold Russell	Barbados	10.7	Q
4	2	Manuel Montalvo	Cuba	10.8	
5	2	Manuel Rivera	Puerto Rico	10.8	
6	2	Thomas Grant	Bahamas	10.9	
7	2	Rafael Domínguez	Dominican Republic	11.4	
1	3	Rafael Romero	Venezuela	10.5	Q
2	3	Cipriani Phillip	Trinidad and Tobago	10.6	Q
3	3	Ramón Vega	Puerto Rico	10.7	Q
4	3	Alberto Torres	Dominican Republic	10.8	
5	3	Lloyd Bascombe	Barbados	11.2	
6	3	Rodobaldo Díaz	Cuba	11.2	
7	3	Óscar López	El Salvador	11.4	
1	4	Tommy Robinson	Bahamas	10.4	Q
2	4	Horacio Esteves	Venezuela	10.5	Q
3	4	Leonel Pedroza	Colombia	10.7	Q
4	4	Noel Mangual	Puerto Rico	10.7	
5	4	Vincent Ackoon	Trinidad and Tobago	10.8	
6	4	Leonel Midi	Dominican Republic	10.8	
6	4	Pablo McNeil	Jamaica	11.2	
	4	Rodolfo Mijares	Mexico	DNS	

Semifinals – 18 August

Rank	Heat	Name	Nationality	Time	Notes
1	1	Horacio Esteves	Venezuela	10.5	Q
2	1	Arquímedes Herrera	Venezuela	10.5	Q
3	1	Dennis Johnson	Jamaica	10.6	Q
4	1	Harold Russell	Barbados	10.7	
5	1	George Collie	Bahamas	10.7	
6	1	Santiago Plaza	Mexico	10.9	
1	2	Rafael Romero	Venezuela	10.3	Q, =GR
2	2	Tommy Robinson	Bahamas	10.4	Q
3	2	Enrique Figuerola	Cuba	10.4	Q
4	2	Cipriani Phillip	Trinidad and Tobago	10.5	
5	2	Leonel Pedroza	Colombia	10.7	
	2	Ramón Vega	Puerto Rico	DNS	

Final – 19 August

Rank	Name	Nationality	Time	Notes
1st place, gold medalist(s)	Tommy Robinson	Bahamas	10.4 (10.41)	
2nd place, silver medalist(s)	Rafael Romero	Venezuela	10.4 (10.47)	
3rd place, bronze medalist(s)	Arquímedes Herrera	Venezuela	10.5 (10.49)	
4	Enrique Figuerola	Cuba	10.5	
5	Dennis Johnson	Jamaica	10.6	
6	Horacio Esteves	Venezuela	10.6	

=== 200 metres ===
Heats – 21 August

Rank	Heat	Name	Nationality	Time	Notes
1	1	George Collie	Bahamas	21.8	Q
2	1	Noel Mangual	Puerto Rico	21.8	Q
3	1	Leonel Pedroza	Colombia	21.9	Q
4	1	Santiago Plaza	Mexico	22.0	
5	1	Alberto Torres	Dominican Republic	22.1	
6	1	Sydney Bradshaw	Barbados	22.3	
1	2	Edwin Roberts	Trinidad and Tobago	21.3	Q
2	2	Enrique Figuerola	Cuba	21.6	Q
3	2	Thomas Grant	Bahamas	22.1	Q
	2	Leonel Midi	Dominican Republic	DNF	
	2	Horacio Esteves	Venezuela	DNS	
	2	Ramón Vega	Puerto Rico	DNS	
1	3	Rafael Romero	Venezuela	21.3	Q
2	3	Manuel Rivera	Puerto Rico	21.6	Q
3	3	Wilton Jackson	Trinidad and Tobago	21.8	Q
4	3	Harold Russell	Barbados	22.0	
5	3	Miguel González	Mexico	22.0	
6	3	Manuel Montalvo	Cuba	22.1	
1	4	Arquímedes Herrera	Venezuela	21.4	Q
2	4	Dennis Johnson	Jamaica	21.7	Q
3	4	Cipriani Phillip	Trinidad and Tobago	21.9	Q
4	4	Rodobaldo Díaz	Cuba	22.1	
5	4	Lloyd Bascombe	Barbados	22.3	
6	4	Óscar López	El Salvador	22.7	

Semifinals – 21 August

Rank	Heat	Name	Nationality	Time	Notes
1	1	Enrique Figuerola	Cuba	21.3	Q
2	1	Rafael Romero	Venezuela	21.6	Q
3	1	Manuel Rivera	Puerto Rico	21.8	Q
4	1	Leonel Pedroza	Colombia	21.9	
5	1	Cipriani Phillip	Trinidad and Tobago	22.0	
6	1	George Collie	Bahamas	22.3	
1	2	Arquímedes Herrera	Venezuela	21.1	Q
2	2	Edwin Roberts	Trinidad and Tobago	21.3	Q
3	2	Wilton Jackson	Trinidad and Tobago	21.7	Q
4	2	Dennis Johnson	Jamaica	21.8	
5	2	Noel Mangual	Puerto Rico	21.9	
6	2	Thomas Grant	Bahamas	22.4	

Final – 22 August

Rank	Name	Nationality	Time	Notes
1st place, gold medalist(s)	Rafael Romero	Venezuela	21.0	
2nd place, silver medalist(s)	Arquímedes Herrera	Venezuela	21.3	
3rd place, bronze medalist(s)	Edwin Roberts	Trinidad and Tobago	21.4	
4	Enrique Figuerola	Cuba	21.6	
5	Wilton Jackson	Trinidad and Tobago	21.7	
6	Manuel Rivera	Puerto Rico	21.8	

=== 400 metres ===
Heats – 21 August

Rank	Heat	Name	Nationality	Time	Notes
1	1	George Kerr	Jamaica	47.5	Q, GR
2	1	Jorge Terán	Mexico	48.8	Q
3	1	Gelasio Morales	Cuba	49.2	Q
4	1	Lloyd Murad	Venezuela	49.6	
5	1	José Luis Villalongo	Puerto Rico	50.0	
6	1	Luis Betancourt	Guatemala	52.4	
1	2	Hortensio Fucil	Venezuela	47.7	Q
2	2	Germán Guenard	Puerto Rico	48.0	Q
3	2	Juan Betancourt	Trinidad and Tobago	49.5	Q
4	2	Charles Benjamin	British Guiana	51.1	
5	2	Juan García	El Salvador	52.1	
	2	Gabriel Morreno	Cuba	DQ	
1	3	Mal Spence	Jamaica	47.9	Q
2	3	Víctor Maldonado	Venezuela	48.2	Q
3	3	Gilberto Faberlle	Puerto Rico	48.5	Q
4	3	Caspar Springer	Barbados	48.8	
5	3	Percy Christie	Bahamas	53.8	
6	3	Héctor Salinas	Mexico	51.3	
1	4	Mel Spence	Jamaica	48.0	Q
2	4	Roberto Gómez	Cuba	48.4	Q
3	4	Eduardo Portillo	Mexico	48.8	Q
4	4	Jim Wedderburn	Barbados	49.2	
5	4	Roderick Manswell	Trinidad and Tobago	49.7	
6	4	Rafael Melo	Colombia	50.2	

Semifinals – ? August

Rank	Heat	Name	Nationality	Time	Notes
1	1	George Kerr	Jamaica	47.5	Q, =GR
2	1	Mel Spence	Jamaica	47.7	Q
3	1	Víctor Maldonado	Venezuela	48.6	Q
4	1	Roberto Gómez	Cuba	48.9	
5	1	Germán Guenard	Puerto Rico	49.5	
6	1	Eduardo Portillo	Mexico	49.8	
1	2	Mal Spence	Jamaica	47.7	Q
2	2	Hortensio Fucil	Venezuela	48.0	Q
3	2	Gilberto Faberlle	Puerto Rico	48.4	Q
4	2	Jorge Terán	Mexico	48.7	
5	2	Juan Betancourt	Trinidad and Tobago	49.5	
6	2	Gelasio Morales	Cuba	49.6	

Final – 23 August

Rank	Name	Nationality	Time	Notes
1st place, gold medalist(s)	George Kerr	Jamaica	45.9	GR
2nd place, silver medalist(s)	Hortensio Fucil	Venezuela	47.3	
3rd place, bronze medalist(s)	Mal Spence	Jamaica	47.4	
4	Mel Spence	Jamaica	47.7	
5	Gilberto Faberlle	Puerto Rico	48.2	
6	Víctor Maldonado	Venezuela	49.5	

=== 800 metres ===
Heats – 19 August

Rank	Heat	Name	Nationality	Time	Notes
1	1	George Kerr	Jamaica	1:51.4	Q
2	1	Leslie Mentor	Venezuela	1:51.8	Q
3	1	José Neira	Colombia	1:53.4	Q
4	1	Leroy Rogers	Panama	1:54.2	
5	1	Evelio Planas	Cuba	1:54.7	
6	1	Héctor Vilches	Mexico	1:56.6	
7	1	Jorge García	Puerto Rico	1:58.1	
8	1	Percy Christie	Bahamas	1:58.5	
1	2	Ralph Gomes	British Guiana	1:51.8	Q
2	2	Caspar Springer	Barbados	1:53.9	Q
3	2	Rueben Roberts	Jamaica	1:54.5	Q
4	2	Lennox Yearwood	Trinidad and Tobago	1:55.3	
5	2	José Rivera	Puerto Rico	1:56.4	
6	2	Marcelino Borrero	Colombia	1:57.0	
7	2	Francisco Coipel	Cuba	NT	
8	2	Félix Chavarri	Venezuela	NT	
1	3	Mel Spence	Jamaica	1:52.0	Q
2	3	Julian Brown	Bahamas	1:52.5	Q
3	3	José Manuel Luna	Mexico	1:53.0	Q
4	3	Rafael Melo	Colombia	1:54.6	
5	3	Juan Colombani	Puerto Rico	1:57.0	
6	3	Luis Betancourt	Guatemala	1:58.3	
7	3	Eduardo Alfonso	Venezuela	NT	
8	3	Abel Betancourt	Cuba	NT	

Final – 20 August

Rank	Name	Nationality	Time	Notes
1st place, gold medalist(s)	George Kerr	Jamaica	1:51.0	GR
2nd place, silver medalist(s)	Mel Spence	Jamaica	1:53.0	
3rd place, bronze medalist(s)	José Neira	Colombia	1:54.8	
4	Leslie Mentor	Venezuela	1:54.9	
5	José Manuel Luna	Mexico	1:56.0	
6	Ralph Gomes	British Guiana	1:56.9	
	Rueben Roberts	Jamaica	?	
	Caspar Springer	Barbados	?	
	Julian Brown	Bahamas	?	

=== 1500 metres ===
Heats – 23 August

Rank	Heat	Name	Nationality	Time	Notes
1	1	Álvaro Mejía	Colombia	3:56.0	Q, GR
2	1	José Manuel Luna	Mexico	3:58.0	Q
3	1	Ervin Campbell	Jamaica	4:00.7	Q
4	1	Leroy Rogers	Panama	4:08.6	
5	1	Ramiro García	Cuba	4:08.5	
6	1	Eduardo Alfonso	Venezuela	4:13.3	
1	2	José Neira	Colombia	3:58.8	Q
2	2	Lennox Yearwood	Trinidad and Tobago	3:59.6	Q
3	2	Juan Colombani	Puerto Rico	4:00.0	Q
4	2	Rueben Roberts	Jamaica	4:00.0	
5	2	Leslie Mentor	Venezuela	4:00.5	
6	2	Francisco Coipel	Cuba	4:03.7	
1	3	Ralph Gomes	British Guiana	4:00.4	Q
2	3	Harvey Borrero	Colombia	4:01.6	Q
3	3	Earle Belcher	Jamaica	4:02.8	Q
4	3	Silvio Jasso	Mexico	4:04.6	
5	3	Félix Chavarri	Venezuela	4:09.6	
6	3	Rolando Pichardo	Cuba	4:14.5	

Final – 24 August

Rank	Name	Nationality	Time	Notes
1st place, gold medalist(s)	Álvaro Mejía	Colombia	3:51.4	GR
2nd place, silver medalist(s)	Ralph Gomes	British Guiana	3:52.5	
3rd place, bronze medalist(s)	José Neira	Colombia	3:52.6	
4	José Manuel Luna	Mexico	3:55.5	
5	Harvey Borrero	Colombia	3:55.8	
6	Earle Belcher	Jamaica	4:00.0	
	Ervin Campbell	Jamaica	?	
	Lennox Yearwood	Trinidad and Tobago	?	
9	Juan Colombani	Puerto Rico	?	

=== 5000 metres ===
21 August

Rank	Name	Nationality	Time	Notes
1st place, gold medalist(s)	Eligio Galicia	Mexico	14:46.6	GR
2nd place, silver medalist(s)	Marciano Castillo	Mexico	15:06.2	
3rd place, bronze medalist(s)	Felipe Prado	Mexico	15:11.0	
4	Manuel Cabrera	Colombia	15:17.2	
5	Rodolfo Méndez	Puerto Rico	15:17.4	
6	Jesús Quetche	Guatemala	15:33.2	
15	Luis Torres	Puerto Rico	NT	
16	Freddy Varga	Puerto Rico	NT	

=== 10,000 metres ===
19 August

Rank	Name	Nationality	Time	Notes
1st place, gold medalist(s)	Eligio Galicia	Mexico	30:55.2	GR
2nd place, silver medalist(s)	Asencio Escalona	Mexico	31:40.8	
3rd place, bronze medalist(s)	Marciano Castillo	Mexico	31:44.4	
4	Florencio Boches	Guatemala	32:15.0	
5	Germán Lozano	Colombia	32:36.2	
6	Hernán Barreneche	Colombia	32:50.0	
14	Luis Torres	Puerto Rico	NT	
15	Rodolfo Méndez	Puerto Rico	NT	
16	Carlos Quiñones	Puerto Rico	NT	

=== Half marathon ===
25 August

Rank	Name	Nationality	Time	Notes
1st place, gold medalist(s)	Hernán Barreneche	Colombia	1:11:49	
2nd place, silver medalist(s)	Fidel Negrete	Mexico	1:12:27	
3rd place, bronze medalist(s)	Víctor Peralta	Mexico	1:13:21	
4	Germán Lozano	Colombia	1:13:30	
5	Daniel Vicencio	Mexico	1:13:40	
6	Sebastián García	Guatemala	1:14:39	
7	Rodolfo Méndez	Puerto Rico	1:15:09	
8	Florentino Oropeza	Venezuela	1:16:24	
9	Carlos Parra	Colombia	1:17:14	
10	Carlos Quiñónez	Puerto Rico	1:18:49	

=== 110 metres hurdles ===
Heats – 21 August

Rank	Heat	Name	Nationality	Time	Notes
1	1	Lázaro Betancourt	Cuba	14.4	Q
2	1	Teófilo Davis Bell	Venezuela	15.0	Q
3	1	Ramond Harvey	Jamaica	15.2	
4	1	Gabriel Roldán	Mexico	16.0	
	1	César Quintero	Colombia	DNS	
1	2	Heriberto Cruz	Puerto Rico	14.4	Q
2	2	Irolán Echevarría	Cuba	14.7	Q
3	2	Juan Muñoz	Venezuela	15.2	
4	2	A. Coley	Jamaica	15.4	
5	2	Alfredo González	Mexico	15.6	
	2	Arturo Perkins	Panama	DNS	
1	3	Lancelot Bobb	Venezuela	14.9	Q
2	3	Wilmon Bryan	Jamaica	15.0	Q
3	3	Callixto Boada	Cuba	15.1	
4	3	Billy Montague	Trinidad and Tobago	15.3	
5	3	Téofilo Colón	Puerto Rico	15.6	
6	3	Guillermo Zapata	Colombia	16.0	

Final – 21 August

Rank	Name	Nationality	Time	Notes
1st place, gold medalist(s)	Lázaro Betancourt	Cuba	14.2	GR
2nd place, silver medalist(s)	Heriberto Cruz	Puerto Rico	14.5	
3rd place, bronze medalist(s)	Lancelot Bobb	Venezuela	14.7	
4	Irolán Echevarría	Cuba	14.8	
5	Wilmon Bryan	Jamaica	15.2	
6	Teófilo Davis Bell	Venezuela	15.5	

=== 400 metres hurdles ===
Heats – 18 August

Rank	Heat	Name	Nationality	Time	Notes
1	1	Juan Montes	Puerto Rico	53.3	Q
2	1	Leroy Keane	Jamaica	54.3	Q
3	1	Raúl Fernández	Cuba	55.3	
4	1	Charles Benjajmin	British Guiana	56.9	
	1	José Torres	Mexico	DQ	
1	2	Arístides Pineda	Venezuela	52.7	Q, GR
2	2	Ovidio de Jesús	Puerto Rico	54.2	Q
3	2	Ramón Herrera	Cuba	54.8	
4	2	Dwight Anderson	Jamaica	55.1	
5	2	Jesús Medina	Mexico	55.4	
	2	Arturo Perkins	Panama	DNS	
1	3	Víctor Maldonado	Venezuela	53.0	Q
2	3	Jorge Cumberbatch	Cuba	53.6	Q
3	3	Walter Rivera	Puerto Rico	54.0	
4	3	Billy Montague	Trinidad and Tobago	54.6	
5	3	Héctor Salinas	Mexico	55.7	
6	3	Douglas Brown	Jamaica	59.9	

Final – 20 August

Rank	Name	Nationality	Time	Notes
1st place, gold medalist(s)	Víctor Maldonado	Venezuela	51.6	GR
2nd place, silver medalist(s)	Juan Montes	Puerto Rico	53.0	
3rd place, bronze medalist(s)	Jorge Cumberbatch	Cuba	53.2	
4	Arístides Pineda	Venezuela	53.5	
5	Leroy Keane	Jamaica	53.8	
6	Ovidio de Jesús	Puerto Rico	56.8	

=== 3000 metres steeplechase ===
20 August

Rank	Name	Nationality	Time	Notes
1st place, gold medalist(s)	Erasmo Prado	Mexico	9:19.8	GR
2nd place, silver medalist(s)	Elías Mendoza	Mexico	9:23.6	
3rd place, bronze medalist(s)	Pedro Mariani	Puerto Rico	9:31.4	
4	Ezequiel García	Mexico	9:41.2	
5	Freddy Vargas	Puerto Rico	9:54.1	
6	Efraín Cordero	El Salvador	9:54.4	
7	Carlos Mujica	Venezuela	NT	
8	Earle Belcher	Jamaica	10:15.8	
15	Benjamín Rodríguez	Puerto Rico	NT	
	Manuel Cabrera	Colombia	DQ	

=== 4 × 100 metres relay ===
Heats – 23 August

Rank	Heat	Nation	Competitors	Time	Notes
1	1	Venezuela	Arquímides Herrera, Lloyd Murad, Rafael Romero, Horacio Esteves	40.4	Q, GR
2	1	Trinidad and Tobago	Cipriani Phillips, Vincent Ackoon, Wilton Jackson, Edwin Roberts	40.5	Q
3	1	Jamaica	Pablo McNeil, Patrick Robinson, Lindley Headley, Dennis Johnson	40.6	Q
4	1	Bahamas	Bernard Nottage, Thomas Grant, Eucal Bullard, George Collie	41.6	
1	2	Cuba	Alejandro Pascual, Miguel Montalvo, Lázaro Betancourt, Enrique Figuerola	40.6	Q
2	2	Puerto Rico	Noel Mangual, Enrique Montalvo, Jorge Deriez, Manuel Rivera	41.1	Q
3	2	Mexico	Santiago Plaza, Jorge Terán, Miguel González, Eduardo Portillo	42.0	Q
4	2	Barbados	Sydney Bradshaw, Caspar Springer, Lloyd Bascombe, Harold Russell	42.0	

Final – 25 August

Rank	Nation	Competitors	Time	Notes
1st place, gold medalist(s)	Venezuela	Arquímides Herrera, Lloyd Murad, Rafael Romero, Horacio Esteves	40.0	GR
2nd place, silver medalist(s)	Trinidad and Tobago	Cipriani Phillips, Vincent Ackoon, Wilton Jackson, Edwin Roberts	40.7	
3rd place, bronze medalist(s)	Jamaica	Pablo McNeil, Patrick Robinson, Lindley Headley, Dennis Johnson	40.8	
4	Puerto Rico	Noel Mangual, Enrique Montalvo, Jorge Deriez, Manuel Rivera	41.2	
	Cuba	Alejandro Pascual, Miguel Montalvo, Lázaro Betancourt, Enrique Figuerola	DQ	
	Mexico	Santiago Plaza, Jorge Terán, Miguel González, Eduardo Portillo	DQ	

=== 4 × 400 metres relay ===
25 August

Rank	Nation	Competitors	Time	Notes
1st place, gold medalist(s)	Jamaica	Mel Spence, Mal Spence, Gilwyn Williams, George Kerr	3:11.6	GR
2nd place, silver medalist(s)	Trinidad and Tobago	Roderick Manswell, Juan Betancourt, Wilton Jackson, Edwin Roberts	3:12.5	
3rd place, bronze medalist(s)	Puerto Rico	Germán Guenard, José Luis Villalongo, Gilberto Faberlle, Ovidio de Jesús	3:15.8	
4	Cuba	Roberto Gómez, Jorge Cumberbatch, Gelasio Morales, Evelio Planas	3:17.1	
5	Venezuela	Leslie Mentor, Lloyd Murad, Víctor Maldonado, Hortensio Fucil	3:19.1	
6	Mexico	Eduardo Portillo, Jesús Medina, José Manuel Luna, Jorge Terán	3:22.9	

=== High jump ===
? August

Rank	Name	Nationality	Result	Notes
1st place, gold medalist(s)	Teodoro Palacios	Guatemala	2.00	GR
2nd place, silver medalist(s)	Anton Norris	Barbados	1.98	
3rd place, bronze medalist(s)	Ernle Haisley	Jamaica	1.94	
4	Ricardo Pérez	Cuba	1.92	
5	Carlos Vásquez	Puerto Rico	1.88	
6	Víctor Irrizarry	Puerto Rico	1.83	
7	Roberto Procel	Mexico	1.83	
8	Othneal Thomas	Jamaica	1.83	
	Julio Lleras	Puerto Rico	?	

=== Pole vault ===
21 August

Rank	Name	Nationality	Result	Notes
1st place, gold medalist(s)	Rolando Cruz	Puerto Rico	4.72	GR
2nd place, silver medalist(s)	Rubén Cruz	Puerto Rico	4.26	
3rd place, bronze medalist(s)	César Quintero	Colombia	3.81	
4	Brígido Iriarte	Venezuela	3.81	
5	Miguel Rivera	Puerto Rico	3.81	
6	McGregor Hinkson	Trinidad and Tobago	3.81	

=== Long jump ===
20 August

Rank	Name	Nationality	Result	Notes
1st place, gold medalist(s)	Juan Muñoz	Venezuela	7.68	GR
2nd place, silver medalist(s)	Wellesley Clayton	Jamaica	7.60	
3rd place, bronze medalist(s)	Abelardo Pacheco	Cuba	7.16	
4	Roberto Procel	Mexico	7.16	
5	Félix Antonetti	Puerto Rico	7.14	
6	Victor Brooks	Jamaica	7.02	
	Julio Lleras	Puerto Rico	?	
	Glidden Feliciano	Puerto Rico	?	

=== Triple jump ===
23 August

Rank	Name	Nationality	Result	Notes
1st place, gold medalist(s)	Mahoney Samuels	Jamaica	15.53	GR
2nd place, silver medalist(s)	Ramón López	Cuba	15.33	
3rd place, bronze medalist(s)	Perry Christie	Bahamas	14.98	
4	Alves Thomas	Venezuela	14.92	
5	José López	Venezuela	14.70	
6	Víctor Hernández	Cuba	14.65	
	Pedro Camacho	Puerto Rico	?	
	Eugenio Dávila	Puerto Rico	?	
	Rumildo Cruz	Puerto Rico	?	

=== Shot put ===
? August

Rank	Name	Nationality	Result	Notes
1st place, gold medalist(s)	Lambertus Rebel	Netherlands Antilles	14.64	GR
2nd place, silver medalist(s)	Héctor Thomas	Venezuela	14.46	
3rd place, bronze medalist(s)	Ramón Rosario	Puerto Rico	13.96	
4	Carlos Yapur	Mexico	13.85	
5	Fidel Estrada	Cuba	13.68	
6	José Bracho	Venezuela	13.59	
	Pedro Nieves	Puerto Rico	?	
	Tomás Vivoni	Puerto Rico	?	

=== Discus throw ===
21 August

Rank	Name	Nationality	Result	Notes
1st place, gold medalist(s)	Dagoberto González	Colombia	48.66	
2nd place, silver medalist(s)	Lambertus Rebel	Netherlands Antilles	47.44	
3rd place, bronze medalist(s)	Daniel Cereali	Venezuela	46.97	
4	Ignacio Reinosa	Puerto Rico	45.77	
5	Modesto Mederos	Cuba	45.36	
6	Carlos Rivera	Puerto Rico	45.10	
	Rubén Dávila	Puerto Rico	?	

=== Hammer throw ===
23 August

Rank	Name	Nationality	Result	Notes
1st place, gold medalist(s)	Enrique Samuells	Cuba	54.15	GR
2nd place, silver medalist(s)	Daniel Cereali	Venezuela	52.85	
3rd place, bronze medalist(s)	Marcelino Borrero	Colombia	50.35	
4	Francisco Fragoso	Mexico	48.38	
5	Julián Núñez	Mexico	48.35	
6	Rubén Dávila	Puerto Rico	45.09	
	Carlos Montes	Puerto Rico	?	
	Ángel Vélez	Puerto Rico	?	

=== Javelin throw ===
24 August – old model

Rank	Name	Nationality	Result	Notes
1st place, gold medalist(s)	Jesús Rodríguez	Venezuela	66.66	
2nd place, silver medalist(s)	Wilfredo Salgado	Puerto Rico	64.24	
3rd place, bronze medalist(s)	Arnoldo Pallarés	Cuba	61.83	
4	Héctor Thomas	Venezuela	61.17	
5	Antonio Olivares	Puerto Rico	60.02	
6	Gil Cordovés	Cuba	59.17	
	Millito Navarro Jr.	Puerto Rico	54.86	

=== Pentathlon ===
24 August

Rank	Name	Nationality	Result	Notes
1st place, gold medalist(s)	Héctor Thomas	Venezuela	3212	
2nd place, silver medalist(s)	Roberto Caravaca	Venezuela	2946	
3rd place, bronze medalist(s)	Jorge García	Puerto Rico	2912	
4	Hugh Malcolm	Jamaica	2827	
5	Raymond Bastardo	Venezuela	2607	
6	Billy Montague	Trinidad and Tobago	2599	
	Félix Antonetti	Puerto Rico	?	
	Miguel Martínez	Puerto Rico	?	

== Women's results ==
=== 100 metres ===
Heats – 21 August

Rank	Heat	Name	Nationality	Time	Notes
1	1	Miguelina Cobián	Cuba	12.0	Q
2	1	Ouida Walker	Jamaica	12.1	Q
3	1	Sigrid Sandiford	Trinidad and Tobago	12.4	Q
4	1	Diane North	Bahamas	12.4	
5	1	Josefina Sobres	Panama	12.5	
6	1	María Haquet	Mexico	13.1	
1	2	Carmen Smith	Jamaica	12.1	Q
2	2	Delceita Oakley	Panama	12.4	Q
3	2	Nereida Borges	Cuba	12.4	Q
4	2	Thora Best	Trinidad and Tobago	12.6	
5	2	Peggy Lynch	Guatemala	13.6	
	2	Benilde Ascanio	Venezuela	DNS	
1	3	Marcela Daniel	Panama	12.1	Q
2	3	Fulgencia Romay	Cuba	12.7	Q
3	3	Sonia Caire	Mexico	12.7	Q
4	3	Elaine Thompson	Bahamas	12.9	
5	3	Gisela Vidal	Venezuela	13.0	
6	3	Silvia Dubois	Guatemala	13.6	
1	4	Adlin Mair	Jamaica	12.1	Q
2	4	Sybil Donmartin	Trinidad and Tobago	12.2	Q
3	4	Lenita Thompson	Barbados	12.5	Q
4	4	Althea Rolle	Bahamas	12.5	
5	4	Esperanza Girón	Mexico	12.6	
6	4	Gladys Valdez	El Salvador	14.3	

Semifinals – ? August

Rank	Heat	Name	Nationality	Time	Notes
1	1	Marcela Daniel	Panama	12.0	Q
2	1	Miguelina Cobián	Cuba	12.1	Q
3	1	Ouida Walker	Jamaica	12.2	Q
4	1	Sigrid Sandiford	Trinidad and Tobago	12.6	
5	1	Lenita Thompson	Barbados	12.6	
6	1	Fulgencia Romay	Cuba	12.7	
1	2	Carmen Smith	Jamaica	12.2	Q
2	2	Sybil Donmartin	Trinidad and Tobago	12.3	Q
3	2	Adlin Mair	Jamaica	12.3	Q
4	2	Delceita Oakley	Panama	12.4	
5	2	Nereida Borges	Cuba	12.4	
6	2	Sonia Caire	Mexico	13.0	

Final – ? August

Rank	Name	Nationality	Time	Notes
1st place, gold medalist(s)	Miguelina Cobián	Cuba	12.0 (12.08)	
2nd place, silver medalist(s)	Marcela Daniel	Panama	12.1 (12.12)	
3rd place, bronze medalist(s)	Sybil Donmartin	Trinidad and Tobago	12.2 (12.20)	
4	Ouida Walker	Jamaica	12.2	
5	Carmen Smith	Jamaica	12.2	
6	Adlin Mair	Jamaica	12.4	

=== 80 metres hurdles ===
Heats – ? August

Rank	Heat	Name	Nationality	Time	Notes
1	1	Bertha Díaz	Cuba	10.9	Q, GR
2	1	Adlin Mair	Jamaica	11.9	Q
3	1	Gisela Vidal	Venezuela	12.3	
	1	Dinor Batista	Panama	DNS	
1	2	Lorraine Dunn	Panama	11.5	Q
2	2	Concepción Portuondo	Cuba	11.8	Q
3	2	Doraldee Pagan	Jamaica	12.2	
4	2	Brenda Barzey	Trinidad and Tobago	12.4	
5	2	Nerva Matheus	Venezuela	13.6	
6	2	Elvira Aracen	Mexico	14.1	
1	3	Carmen Smith	Jamaica	11.9	Q
2	3	Benilde Ascanio	Venezuela	12.4	Q
3	3	Patricia Watts	Trinidad and Tobago	12.8	
4	3	Mercedes Román	Mexico	13.3	
	3	Veronica Torralbas	Cuba	DNS	

Final – ? August

Rank	Name	Nationality	Time	Notes
1st place, gold medalist(s)	Bertha Díaz	Cuba	11.1	
2nd place, silver medalist(s)	Lorraine Dunn	Panama	11.7	
3rd place, bronze medalist(s)	Carmen Smith	Jamaica	11.8	
4	Concepción Portuondo	Cuba	11.8	
5	Adlin Mair	Jamaica	11.9	
6	Benilde Ascanio	Venezuela	12.6	

=== 4 × 100 metres relay ===
? August

Rank	Nation	Competitors	Time	Notes
1st place, gold medalist(s)	Jamaica	Dorothy Yates, Carmen Williams, Carmen Smith, Ouida Walker	47.0	GR
2nd place, silver medalist(s)	Cuba	Berta Díaz, Nereida Borges, Miguelina Cobián, Fulgencia Romay	47.3	
3rd place, bronze medalist(s)	Panama	Lorraine Dunn, Marcela Daniel, Delceita Oakley, Dinor Batista	47.7	
4	Trinidad and Tobago	Sybil Donmartin, Barbara Patterson, Thora Best, Sigrid Sandiford	48.2	
5	Bahamas	Diane North, Elaine Thompson, Christina Jones, Althea Rolle	48.7	
6	Mexico	Sonia Caire, Esperanza Girón, María Haquet, Elvira Aracen	50.2	

=== High jump ===
20 August

Rank	Name	Nationality	Result	Notes
1st place, gold medalist(s)	Brenda Archer	British Guiana	1.53	GR
2nd place, silver medalist(s)	Marta Font	Cuba	1.51	
3rd place, bronze medalist(s)	Beverley Welsh	Jamaica	1.51	
4	Verónica Torrealba	Cuba	1.47	
5	Althea Callender	Barbados	1.45	
6	Lidia Velsaco	Colombia	1.45	

=== Long jump ===
? August

Rank	Name	Nationality	Result	Notes
1st place, gold medalist(s)	Bertha Díaz	Cuba	5.50	GR
2nd place, silver medalist(s)	Dorothy Yates	Jamaica	5.38	
3rd place, bronze medalist(s)	Gisela Vidal	Venezuela	5.35	
4	Irene Martínez	Cuba	5.30	
5	Fave Elliott	Jamaica	5.24	
6	Marcia Salas	Cuba	5.18	

=== Discus throw ===
? August

Rank	Name	Nationality	Result	Notes
1st place, gold medalist(s)	Caridad Agüero	Cuba	43.75	GR
2nd place, silver medalist(s)	Alejandrina Herrera	Cuba	38.70	
3rd place, bronze medalist(s)	Ivonne Rojano	Mexico	38.69	
4	Imelda Espinosa	Mexico	37.84	
5	Hilda Ramírez	Cuba	36.98	
6	Nerva Matheus	Venezuela	36.00	

=== Javelin throw ===
? August – old model

Rank	Name	Nationality	Result	Notes
1st place, gold medalist(s)	Hilda Ramírez	Cuba	40.32	GR
2nd place, silver medalist(s)	Beverly Eloisa Oglivie	Panama	40.19	
3rd place, bronze medalist(s)	Berta Chiú	Mexico	35.63	
4	Marilyn Bayley	Trinidad and Tobago	35.63	
5	Eileen Sutherland	Jamaica	35.52	
5	María Rizzo	Guatemala	34.99	
