= Lester Carney =

American sprinter (born 1934)

Les Carney
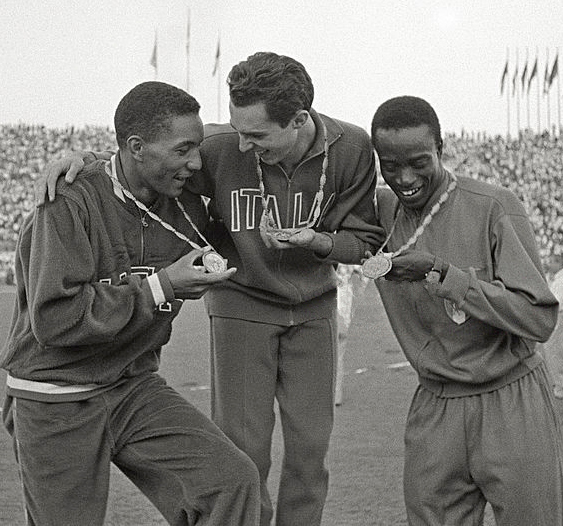
- Lester Carney (left) at the 1960 Olympics

Personal information
- Full name: Lester Nelson Carney
- Born: March 31, 1934 (age 92) Bellaire, Ohio, U.S.
- Height: 1.78 m (5 ft 10 in)
- Weight: 75 kg (165 lb)

Sport
- Sport: Athletics
- Event: Sprint
- Club: Akron Track Club

Achievements and titles
- Personal bests: 100 yd – 9.6 (1959); 100 m – 10.3 (1956); 200 m – 20.69 (1960)
Medal record
Men's athletics
Representing United States
Olympic Games
Silver medal – second place	1960 Rome	200 m
Pan American Games
Silver medal – second place	1959 Chicago	200 m

Lester Nelson "Les" Carney (born March 31, 1934) is a retired American sprinter who won a silver medal in the 200 m at the 1960 Summer Olympics, ahead of two team members who beat him at the Olympic trials. He won another silver in this event at the 1959 Pan American Games.

Carney also played American football at Ohio University. He was drafted in the 15th round by the Baltimore Colts in 1958 but never played professionally. After retiring from sports he worked as a buyer of sporting goods for the M. O'Neil Co. department store chain in Akron, Ohio.

On October 2, 2015, Indian Creek High School (formerly known as Wintersville High School) in Wintersville, Ohio, named its new track and field after the Olympic silver medalist. The field is now the Lester Carney Track at Kettlewell Stadium.
