= Black Thursday (1960 Rome Olympics) =

Black Thursday was the phrase coined by Oscar Fraley, to describe the failings of the American athletes in the track and field events on Thursday 1 September 1960, at the Rome Olympics.

== Ray Norton and John Thomas ==
The two most notable failures that day were those of Ray Norton and John Thomas in the 100 metres and high jump, respectively. Ray Norton was considered the world's best 100 m sprinter in 1959 and had won the United States Olympic Trials. In the end, he trailed in last place in the final and looked a shadow of his former self. John Thomas was the world record holder but settled for a bronze medal. The loss by Thomas to two Soviet athletes at the height of the Cold War was seen as a national triumph by the Soviets. The phrase ‘Black Thursday’ was resonant of other ‘Black Thursdays’ of the then recent past and in the living memory of many people alive at the time, most notably the Thursday that signalled the start of the Wall Street crash of 1929. In addition, 1 September was the 21st anniversary of Hitler's invasion of Poland.

== In retrospect ==
1 September in the Olympic Stadium was viewed at the time as a disaster for the United States, but in other Olympic events that day the Americans triumphed and, on subsequent days in the Olympic stadium, some limited success was restored to their track and field team.
