= Silvia Hunte =

Panamanian sprinter

Personal information
- Full name: Silvia Hunte Zambrano
- Born: 14 April 1938 (age 87) Panama City, Panama
- Height: 1.55 m (5 ft 1 in)
- Weight: 47 kg (104 lb)

Sport
- Sport: Sprinting
- Event: 100 metres

Silvia Hunte Zambrano (born 14 April 1938) is a Panamanian sprinter. She competed in the women's 4 × 100 metres relay at the 1960 Summer Olympics. She finished second in the 1959 Pan American Games 4 × 100 metres relay (with Carlota Gooden, Jean Holmes-Mitchell, and Marcela Daniel).

== International competitions ==
| Year | Competition | Venue | Position | Event | Notes |
Representing Panama
| 1959 | Central American and Caribbean Games | Caracas, Venezuela | 4th | 100 m | 13.4 |
| 1959 | Central American and Caribbean Games | Caracas, Venezuela | 3rd | 80 m hurdles | 13.43 |
| 1959 | Central American and Caribbean Games | Caracas, Venezuela | 1st | 4 × 100 m relay | 50.51 |
| 1959 | Central American and Caribbean Games | Caracas, Venezuela | 3rd | High jump | 1.40 m |
| 1959 | Pan American Games | Chicago, United States | 11th (h) | 80 m hurdles | 12.3 |
| 1959 | Pan American Games | Chicago, United States | 2nd | 4 × 100 m relay | 48.2 |
| 1959 | Pan American Games | Chicago, United States | 6th | Javelin throw | 33.33 m |
| 1960 | Olympic Games | Rome, Italy | 6th (h) | 4 × 100 m relay | 46.66 |
| 1960 | Ibero-American Games | Santiago, Chile | 1st | 4 × 100 m relay | 47.2 |
| 1961 | Bolivarian Games | Barranquilla, Colombia | 2nd | 100 m | 12.5 |
| 1961 | Bolivarian Games | Barranquilla, Colombia | 2nd | 200 m | 26.5 |
| 1961 | Bolivarian Games | Barranquilla, Colombia | 1st | 4 × 100 m relay | 50.0 |
