= Dennis Johnson (sprinter) =

Jamaican sprinter (1939–2021)

Personal information
- Born: Dennis Osric Johnson; 6 May 1939 Kingston, Jamaica
- Died: 22 April 2021 (aged 81)
- Height: 5 ft 11 in (1.80 m)
- Weight: 161 lb (73 kg)

Sport
- College team: San Jose State Spartans
Medal record
Men's athletics
Representing British West Indies
Pan American Games
Bronze medal – third place	1959 Chicago	4×100 m
Representing Jamaica
Central American and Caribbean Games
Bronze medal – third place	1962 Kingston	4×100 m relay

Dennis Osric Johnson OD (6 May 1939 – 22 April 2021) was a Jamaican sprinter who equalled the world record, 9.3 seconds, for the 100-yard dash in 1961. Johnson later became a coach and advisor, and the architect of the Jamaican athletics programme.

== Track career ==
Born in Jamaica in 1939, Johnson traveled to the United States for his college education. He studied at San Jose State College (now San Jose State University), where he was coached by the legendary sprints coach Bud Winter and was a member of the San Jose State Spartans track team.

In 1959, he won a bronze medal at the 1959 Pan American Games in the 4 × 100 m relay as a member of a combined West Indies Federation team.

In 1961, within a six-week period, he equalled the then world record for the 100 yards three times at 9.3 s:

- 11 March at San Jose in the San Jose State Relays meet;
- 15 April at San Jose in the Armed Forces Meeting;
- 5 May at Sunnyvale in the San Jose State All-comers meet.

(He also equalled the same time on 1 April at Stanford in a university meet but the lack of a wind gauge meant the time could not be ratified as a world record.)

His season was shortened by injury, and he could not compete for the United States collegiate and national championship titles.

In 1962, he was one of the favourites for the 100 and 220 yards titles at the 1962 British Empire and Commonwealth Games but he ended up finishing fifth in the 110 yards and withdrew from the 220 yards event because of a groin injury.

In 1964, at the Tokyo Olympics he finished 4th in the 4 × 100 m relay as a member of the Jamaican team.

== Coaching career ==
After leaving college, Johnson went into a career in sports development and was to become renowned as the architect of Jamaica's subsequent track and field success.

Johnson's dream on leaving San Jose State University was to take what he'd learnt there and develop, for the first time, a US-style college athletic program in Jamaica. Johnson's inspiration was the legendary San Jose sprints coach, Bud Winter - "'Bud' Winter was a master coach. I decided to come back home and bring his methodology to training sprinters in Jamaica", Johnson has stated.

In 1971, Johnson started a sports program at what was then a two-year vocational college, the College of Arts, Science and Technology (CAST), that later, in 1995, became University of Technology, Jamaica (UTech), a four-year college. Amongst Johnson's first training group was a then 20-year-old Anthony Davis, who was later to follow Johnson as sports director at UTech.

Johnson has also stated how he was also inspired to emulate the great Jamaican sprinter, Herb McKenley, who had coached Johnson in high school and passed on what he had learned from his time in the United States - "I just wanted to be like him." To help foster the coaching of adult athletes, Johnson and UTech entered a partnership with Stephen Francis and the MVP Track and Field club in Kingston.

Johnson has served at Utech in many capacities: as Chairman of the Sport Advisory Council; as Adjunct Associate Professor of Sport Science; the first Director of Sports; and has headed Special Projects for Intercollegiate Sports. In addition, he was the founder of the Jamaican Inter-Collegiate sports competition.

Commonly known by the initials DJ, Johnson or DJ is world-renowned as a coach and many of his pupils have gone onto coach other coaches themselves.

In 2010, he was able to start a Sports Science degree programme at UTech.

Johnson died on 22 April 2021, from COVID-19. He was 81.

== Awards ==
- In 2001, Johnson was inducted into the San Jose State Spartans Hall of Fame.
- In 2001, Johnson was awarded the Order of Distinction (OD) by the government of Jamaica.
- In 2009, Johnson was awarded UTech's Chancellor's Medal.
- In 2012, UTech renamed its athletes’ residence, previously known as the Track House, in Johnson's honour.
- In 2014, Johnson won the Pioneer Award from Team Jamaica Buble (Team Jamaica Bickle is a support programme for Jamaican athletes and staff competing at the Penn Relays) for his "contribution to Jamaica’s progression in Track and Field and his invaluable support in the development of the sport off the track". In addition, Johnson was honoured by three branches of the United States government, receiving.

- United States House of Representatives Proclamation from the office of US Congresswoman Yvette D Clarke;
- a New York State Assembly Citation from the office of Assemblyman N Nick Perry;
- and a New York City Council Citation from the office of Council Member Jumaane D Williams.

== International competitions ==
Year	Competition	Venue	Position	Event	Notes
Representing Jamaica
1959	Central American and Caribbean Games	Caracas, Venezuela	3rd (h)	100 m	10.7
1959	Central American and Caribbean Games	Caracas, Venezuela	10th (h)	200 m	22.8
1959	Central American and Caribbean Games	Caracas, Venezuela	5th	4 × 100 m relay	44.0
1959	British West Indies Championships	Georgetown, British Guiana	2nd	100 m	?
1959	Pan American Games^{1}	Chicago, United States	5th	100 m	10.6
1959	Pan American Games^{1}	Chicago, United States	3rd	4 × 100 m relay	41.1
1960	British West Indies Championships	Kingston, Jamaica	2nd	100 m	10.4
1960	Olympic Games^{1}	Rome, Italy	4th (qf)	100 m	10.4
1960	Olympic Games^{1}	Rome, Italy	6th (sf)	200 m	21.0
1962	Central American and Caribbean Games	Kingston, Jamaica	5th	100 m	10.6
1962	Central American and Caribbean Games	Kingston, Jamaica	6th (sf)	200 m	21.8
1962	Central American and Caribbean Games	Kingston, Jamaica	3rd	4 × 100 m relay	40.8
1962	British Empire and Commonwealth Games	Perth, Australia	5th	100 y	9.9
1964	Olympic Games	Tokyo, Japan	15th (qf)	100 m	10.5
1964	Olympic Games	Tokyo, Japan	4th	4 × 100 m relay	39.4

^{1}Representing the British West Indies

== Rankings ==
Johnson was ranked 2nd in the world in the 100 m sprint in 1961 according to the votes of the experts of Track and Field News.

100 meters
Year	World rank
1961	2nd

== See also ==
- Dennis Johnson, sportsreference.com.
- Interview with Jamaica's Dennis Johnson, Jimson Lee, speedendurance.com, 5 December 2011.
