= Manuel Rivera (athlete) =

Puerto Rican sprinter

Personal information
- Full name: Manuel Rivera Guevarra
- Nationality: Puerto Rican
- Born: 1 January 1935 Las Piedras, Puerto Rico
- Died: 14 July 1994 (aged 59) Gurabo, Puerto Rico

Sport
- Sport: Sprinting
- Events: 100 metres, 200 metres
Medal record
Men's Athletics
Representing Puerto Rico
1959 Central American and Caribbean Games
Gold medal – first place	1959 Caracas	100 m
Gold medal – first place	1959 Caracas	4x400 m relay

Manuel Rivera Guevarra (5 January 1935 – 14 July 1994) was a Puerto Rican sprinter. He won medals at the 1959 Central American and Caribbean Games and the 1962 Ibero-American Games.

== International competitions ==
Year	Competition	Venue	Position	Event	Notes
Representing Puerto Rico
1954	Central American and Caribbean Games	Mexico City, Mexico	17th (sf)	100 m	11.2
1954	Central American and Caribbean Games	Mexico City, Mexico	10th (sf)	200 m	22.1
1954	Central American and Caribbean Games	Mexico City, Mexico	5th	4 × 100 m relay	42.0
1959	Central American and Caribbean Games	Caracas, Venezuela	1st	100 m	10.87
1959	Central American and Caribbean Games	Caracas, Venezuela	1st	200 m	21.79
1959	Central American and Caribbean Games	Caracas, Venezuela	2nd	4 × 100 m relay	42.27
1959	Central American and Caribbean Games	Caracas, Venezuela	1st	4 × 400 m relay	3:16.91
1959	Pan American Games	Chicago, United States	5th (sf)	100 m	10.5
1959	Pan American Games	Chicago, United States	10th (sf)	200 m	21.9
1959	Pan American Games	Chicago, United States	5th	4 × 100 m relay	41.7
1959	Pan American Games	Chicago, United States	3rd	4 × 400 m relay	3:12.4
1960	Ibero-American Games	Santiago, Chile	11th (sf)	100 m	11.0
1960	Ibero-American Games	Santiago, Chile	6th (h)	4 × 100 m relay	42.6
1962	Central American and Caribbean Games	Kingston, Jamaica	15th (h)	100 m	10.8
1962	Central American and Caribbean Games	Kingston, Jamaica	6th	200 m	21.8
1962	Central American and Caribbean Games	Kingston, Jamaica	4th	4 × 100 m relay	41.2
1962	Ibero-American Games	Madrid, Spain	2nd	100 m	10.9
1962	Ibero-American Games	Madrid, Spain	4th	200 m	21.7
1962	Ibero-American Games	Madrid, Spain	5th	4 × 100 m relay	42.7
1963	Pan American Games	São Paulo, Brazil	12th (h)	100 m	10.96
1963	Pan American Games	São Paulo, Brazil	6th	200 m	22.0
1963	Pan American Games	São Paulo, Brazil	5th	4 × 100 m relay	42.02

== Personal bests ==
- 100 metres – 10.4h (1955)
- 200 metres – 21.4h (1955)
