= Marcel Wendelin =

German sprinter (born 1939)

Personal information
- Nationality: German
- Born: 14 June 1939 (age 87)

Sport
- Sport: Sprinting
- Event: 200 metres

Marcel Wendelin (born 14 June 1939) is a German sprinter. He competed in the men's 200 metres at the 1960 Summer Olympics.
