= Lloyd Murad =

Venezuelan sprinter (born 1933)

Medal record

Men's Athletics

Representing Venezuela

Ibero-American Games
Gold medal – first place	1960 Santiago	4x100 m relay
Bronze medal – third place	1960 Santiago	200 m

Lloyd Laurentius Murad (born 9 April 1933) is a Venezuelan retired sprinter who competed in the 1960 Summer Olympics and in the 1964 Summer Olympics. He won a silver medal in the 1959 Pan American Games 4×100 metres relay. He attended San Jose State College and was coached by Bud Winter.

== International competitions ==
Year	Competition	Venue	Position	Event	Notes
Representing Venezuela
1959	Central American and Caribbean Games	Caracas, Venezuela	3rd	100 m	10.92
1959	Central American and Caribbean Games	Caracas, Venezuela	3rd	200 m	22.40
1959	Central American and Caribbean Games	Caracas, Venezuela	1st	4 × 100 m relay	42.14
1959	Pan American Games	Chicago, United States	5th (h)	200 m	NT
1959	Pan American Games	Chicago, United States	2nd	4 × 100 m relay	41.1
1960	Olympic Games	Rome, Italy	24th (qf)	100 m	10.8
1960	Olympic Games	Rome, Italy	30th (h)	200 m	21.8
1960	Olympic Games	Rome, Italy	5th	4 × 100 m relay	40.83
1960	Ibero-American Games	Santiago, Chile	3rd	200 m	21.5
1960	Ibero-American Games	Santiago, Chile	1st	4 × 100 m relay	40.3
1960	Ibero-American Games	Santiago, Chile	8th (h)	4 × 400 m relay	3:20.9
1962	Central American and Caribbean Games	Kingston, Jamaica	15th (h)	400 m	49.6
1962	Central American and Caribbean Games	Kingston, Jamaica	1st	4 × 100 m relay	40.0
1962	Central American and Caribbean Games	Kingston, Jamaica	5th	4 × 400 m relay	3:19.1
1962	Ibero-American Games	Madrid, Spain	2nd	4 × 100 m relay	41.6
1962	Ibero-American Games	Madrid, Spain	1st	4 × 400 m relay	3:15.4
1964	Olympic Games	Tokyo, Japan	29th (qf)	100 m	10.7
1964	Olympic Games	Tokyo, Japan	6th	4 × 100 m relay	39.5
