= Juan Lebrón =

Puerto Rican hurdler

Personal information
- Nationality: Puerto Rican
- Born: Juan Lebrón González; 23 June 1934 Guayama, Puerto Rico
- Died: 18 January 2013 (aged 78)

Sport
- Sport: Track and field
- Event: 110 metres hurdles

Juan Lebrón González (23 June 1934 – 18 January 2013) was a Puerto Rican hurdler. He competed in the men's 110 metres hurdles at the 1952 Summer Olympics.

== International competitions ==
Year	Competition	Venue	Position	Event	Notes
Representing Puerto Rico
1952	Olympic Games	Helsinki, Finland	26th (h)	110 m hurdles	15.71
1959	Central American and Caribbean Games	Caracas, Venezuela	6th	110 m hurdles	16.3

== Personal bests ==
- 110 metres hurdles – 14.4h (1956)
