= Athletics at the 1959 Central American and Caribbean Games – Results =

These are the results of the athletics competition at the 1959 Central American and Caribbean Games which took place between 7 and 12 January 1959, at the Olympic Stadium in Caracas, Venezuela.

== Men's results ==
=== 100 metres ===
Heats – 7 January

Rank	Heat	Name	Nationality	Time	Notes
1	1	Horacio Esteves	Venezuela	10.8	Q
2	1	Santiago Plaza	Mexico	10.8	Q
3	1	Ramón Vega	Puerto Rico	10.8	
4	1	Martín Francis	Panama	11.3	
5	1	Orlando Stanley	Costa Rica	11.7	
1	2	Lloyd Murad	Venezuela	10.8	Q
2	2	Keswick Smalling	Jamaica	10.8	Q
3	2	Rubén Díaz	Puerto Rico	10.8	
4	2	Manuel Rivas	Panama	10.9	
5	2	Sergio Higuera	Mexico	11.2	
1	3	Manuel Rivera	Puerto Rico	10.6	Q
2	3	Rafael Romero	Venezuela	10.6	Q
3	3	Dennis Johnson	Jamaica	10.7	
4	3	Luis Carter	Panama	11.1	
5	3	René Ahumada	Mexico	11.8	

Final – 8 January

Rank	Name	Nationality	Time	Notes
1st place, gold medalist(s)	Manuel Rivera	Puerto Rico	10.9 (10.87)	
2nd place, silver medalist(s)	Horacio Esteves	Venezuela	10.9 (10.91)	
3rd place, bronze medalist(s)	Lloyd Murad	Venezuela	10.9 (10.92)	
4	Rafael Romero	Venezuela	10.9	
5	Santiago Plaza	Mexico	10.9	
6	Keswick Smalling	Jamaica	11.2	

=== 200 metres ===
Heats – 9 January

Rank	Heat	Name	Nationality	Time	Notes
1	1	Rafael Romero	Venezuela	22.3	Q
2	1	Iván Rodríguez	Puerto Rico	22.7	Q
3	1	Sergio Higuera	Mexico	22.9	
4	1	Martín Francis	Panama	24.0	
1	2	Manuel Rivera	Puerto Rico	21.6	Q
2	2	Lloyd Murad	Venezuela	22.3	Q
3	2	Manuel Rivas	Panama	22.3	
4	2	Dennis Johnson	Jamaica	22.8	
1	3	Keswick Smalling	Jamaica	22.5	Q
2	3	Santiago Plaza	Mexico	22.5	Q
3	3	Ramón Vega	Puerto Rico	22.5	
4	3	Alfonso Bruno	Venezuela	22.7	
5	3	Luis Carter	Panama	23.1	

Final – 10 January

Rank	Name	Nationality	Time	Notes
1st place, gold medalist(s)	Manuel Rivera	Puerto Rico	21.7 (21.79)	
2nd place, silver medalist(s)	Rafael Romero	Venezuela	21.7 (21.92)	
3rd place, bronze medalist(s)	Lloyd Murad	Venezuela	22.2 (22.40)	
4	Santiago Plaza	Mexico	22.4	
5	Iván Rodríguez	Puerto Rico	22.4	
6	Keswick Smalling	Jamaica	22.6	

=== 400 metres ===
Heats – 9 January

Rank	Heat	Name	Nationality	Time	Notes
1	1	Iván Rodríguez	Puerto Rico	49.2	Q
2	1	Juan José Godínez	Mexico	51.5	Q
3	1	Rodolfo Ramírez	Mexico	51.6	Q
4	1	Erick McFarlane	Panama	51.8	
5	1	Euromides García	Venezuela	56.2	
1	2	Ovidio de Jesús	Puerto Rico	48.7	Q
2	2	Frank Rivera	Puerto Rico	49.7	Q
3	2	Evaristo Edie	Venezuela	49.8	Q
4	2	Jorge Terán	Mexico	49.9	
5	2	Emilio Romero	Venezuela	50.0	

Final – 10 January

Rank	Name	Nationality	Time	Notes
1st place, gold medalist(s)	Ovidio de Jesús	Puerto Rico	48.6 (48.73)	
2nd place, silver medalist(s)	Iván Rodríguez	Puerto Rico	49.0 (48.93)	
3rd place, bronze medalist(s)	Evaristo Edie	Venezuela	49.8 (49.98)	
4	Frank Rivera	Puerto Rico	50.3	
5	Rodolfo Ramírez	Mexico	50.9	
6	Juan José Godínez	Mexico	51.2	

=== 800 metres ===
Heats – 7 January

Rank	Heat	Name	Nationality	Time	Notes
1	1	Ralph Gomes	British Guiana	1:59.8	Q
2	1	Harvey Borrero	Colombia	2:00.4	Q
3	1	Frank Rivera	Puerto Rico	2:01.3	Q
4	1	Enrique Alfonzo	Venezuela	2:01.3	Q
5	1	José Manuel Luna	Mexico	2:04.0	
6	1	Frankie Montes	Puerto Rico	NT	
7	1	Guillermo Rocca	Venezuela	NT	
1	2	Agustín Pantón	Panama	2:00.4	Q
2	2	Wilfredo Vélez	Puerto Rico	2:00.5	Q
3	2	Jorge Leal	Mexico	2:00.7	Q
4	2	Albano Ariza	Colombia	2:01.1	Q
5	2	Rodolfo Ramírez	Mexico	2:02.7	
6	2	Luis Belló	Venezuela	2:04.5	

Final – 8 January

Rank	Name	Nationality	Time	Notes
1st place, gold medalist(s)	Ralph Gomes	British Guiana	1:57.7	
2nd place, silver medalist(s)	Harvey Borrero	Colombia	1:58.4	
3rd place, bronze medalist(s)	Jorge Leal	Mexico	1:58.8	
4	Frank Rivera	Puerto Rico	1:59.0	
5	Albano Ariza	Colombia	1:59.3	
6	Wilfredo Vélez	Puerto Rico	1:59.5	
	Enrique Alfonzo	Venezuela	NT	
	Agustín Pantón	Panama	NT	

=== 1500 metres ===
11 January

Rank	Name	Nationality	Time	Notes
1st place, gold medalist(s)	Harvey Borrero	Colombia	4:04.0 (4:04.37)	GR, NR
2nd place, silver medalist(s)	Alfredo Tinoco	Mexico	4:05.6 (4:06.00)	
3rd place, bronze medalist(s)	Ralph Gomes	British Guiana	4:06.0 (4:08.16)	
4	Frankie Montes	Puerto Rico	4:08.7	
5	José Manuel Luna	Mexico	4:10.6	
6	Hernando Ruiz	Colombia	4:11.0	
8	César Colón	Puerto Rico	NT	
10	Rodolfo Méndez	Puerto Rico	NT	
	Albano Ariza	Colombia	NT	
	Alfonso Tinoco	Mexico	NT	
	Julio Marín	Costa Rica	NT	
	Julio Quevedo	Guatemala	NT	
	Rómulo Méndez	Guatemala	NT	
	Enrique Alfonzo	Venezuela	NT	
	Carlos Mujica	Venezuela	NT	
	Filemón Camacho	Venezuela	NT	
	Agustín Pantón	Panama	NT	

=== 5000 metres ===
9 January

Rank	Name	Nationality	Time	Notes
1st place, gold medalist(s)	Isidro Segura	Mexico	15:41.6 (15:41.94)	GR
2nd place, silver medalist(s)	Guadalupe Jiménez	Mexico	15:54.7 (15:55.06)	
3rd place, bronze medalist(s)	Marciano Castillo	Mexico	15:55.4 (15:56.10)	
4	Manuel Cabrera	Colombia	16:02.6	
5	Germán Lozano	Colombia	16:17.7	
6	Javier Alarcón	Colombia	16:27.4	
	Rigoberto Guzmán	El Salvador	NT	
	Ralph Gomes	British Guiana	NT	
	Guillermo Oxiaj	Guatemala	NT	
	Macario Subuyuj	Guatemala	NT	
	Florencio Boches	Guatemala	NT	
	Filemón Camacho	Venezuela	NT	
	Carlos Mujica	Venezuela	NT	
	Florentino Oropeza	Venezuela	NT	
15	Carlos Quiñónez	Puerto Rico	NT	
16	Rodolfo Méndez	Puerto Rico	NT	
17	Luis Torres	Puerto Rico	NT	

=== 10,000 metres ===
7 January

Rank	Name	Nationality	Time	Notes
1st place, gold medalist(s)	Josafath Hernández	Mexico	32:50.8 (32:51.36)	GR
2nd place, silver medalist(s)	Isidro Segura	Mexico	32:58.8 (32:59.17)	
3rd place, bronze medalist(s)	Pedro Peralta	Mexico	33:54.3 (33:25.51)	
4	Germán Lozano	Colombia	34:30.0	
5	Manuel Cabrera	Colombia	34:42.3	
6	Javier Alarcón	Colombia	35:08.7	
	Pedro Torres	El Salvador	NT	
	Florentino Oropeza	Venezuela	NT	
	Santos Tovar	Venezuela	NT	
	Víctor Tua	Venezuela	NT	
	Guillermo Oxiaj	Guatemala	NT	
11	Agustín Reyes	Puerto Rico	NT	
12	Luis Torres	Puerto Rico	NT	

=== Half marathon ===
12 January

Rank	Name	Nationality	Time	Notes
1st place, gold medalist(s)	Pedro Peralta	Mexico	1:10:29	GR
2nd place, silver medalist(s)	Pedro Alvarado	Mexico	1:11:47	
3rd place, bronze medalist(s)	Germán Lozano	Colombia	1:13:40	
4	Isidro Resendiz	Mexico	1:13:40	
5	Florencio Boches	Guatemala	1:14:40	
6	Manuel Cabrera	Colombia	1:14:43	
	Macario Subuyuj	Guatemala	NT	
	Guillermo Oxiaj	Guatemala	NT	
9	Luis Torres	Puerto Rico	NT	
10	Carlos Quiñónez	Puerto Rico	NT	
11	Agustín Reyes	Puerto Rico	NT	
	Santos Tovar	Venezuela	NT	
	Víctor Tua	Venezuela	NT	
	José Manuel Meza	Venezuela	NT	
	Pedro Torres	El Salvador	NT	
	Javier Alarcón	Colombia	NT	
	Clem Fields	British Guiana	NT	

=== 110 metres hurdles ===
Heats – 9 January

Rank	Heat	Name	Nationality	Time	Notes
1	1	Teófilo Davis Bell	Venezuela	15.1	Q
2	1	Teófilo Colón	Puerto Rico	15.1	Q
3	1	John Muñoz	Venezuela	16.1	Q
4	1	Alfredo González	Mexico	16.2	
5	1	Gabriel Roldán	Mexico	16.8	
1	2	Juan Lebrón	Puerto Rico	15.6	Q
2	2	Arthur Perkins	Panama	15.6	Q
3	2	Víctor Maldonado	Venezuela	16.1	Q
4	2	Heriberto Cuevas	Puerto Rico	16.1	
5	2	Leopoldo Vásquez	Mexico	16.3	

Final – 10 January

Rank	Name	Nationality	Time	Notes
1st place, gold medalist(s)	Teófilo Davis Bell	Venezuela	15.2 (15.39)	
2nd place, silver medalist(s)	Teófilo Colón	Puerto Rico	15.9 (15.95)	
3rd place, bronze medalist(s)	Víctor Maldonado	Venezuela	16.0 (16.05)	
4	Arthur Perkins	Panama	16.0	
5	John Muñoz	Venezuela	16.0	
6	Juan Lebrón	Puerto Rico	16.3	

=== 400 metres hurdles ===
Heats – 7 January

Rank	Heat	Name	Nationality	Time	Notes
1	1	Ovidio de Jesús	Puerto Rico	55.5	Q
2	1	Víctor Maldonado	Venezuela	58.3	Q
3	1	Gabriel Roldán	Mexico	1:00.1	Q
4	1	Juan Leiva	Venezuela	NT	
1	2	Juan Montes	Puerto Rico	56.6	Q
2	2	Tito Bracho	Venezuela	57.2	Q
3	2	Óscar Fernández	Mexico	57.4	Q
4	2	Heriberto Cuevas	Puerto Rico	NT	
5	2	Arthur Perkins	Panama	NT	

Final – 8 January

Rank	Name	Nationality	Time	Notes
1st place, gold medalist(s)	Ovidio de Jesús	Puerto Rico	53.4 (53.42)	
2nd place, silver medalist(s)	Víctor Maldonado	Venezuela	54.2 (54.18)	
3rd place, bronze medalist(s)	Óscar Fernández	Mexico	55.2 (55.51)	
4	Gabriel Roldán	Mexico	55.4	
5	Juan Montes	Puerto Rico	56.0	
6	Tito Bracho	Venezuela	56.3	

=== 3000 metres steeplechase ===
8 January

Rank	Name	Nationality	Time	Notes
1st place, gold medalist(s)	Alfredo Tinoco	Mexico	10:50.8	
2nd place, silver medalist(s)	Luciano Gómez	Mexico	11:11.6	
3rd place, bronze medalist(s)	Hernando Ruíz	Colombia	11:45.5	
4	Arturo Martínez	Mexico	11:59.3	
5	Víctor Hurtarte	Guatemala	12:06.9	
6	Rigoberto Guzmán	El Salvador	12:09.3	
	José Otto Escobedo	Guatemala	NT	
	Clem Fields	British Guiana	NT	
	Harvey Borrero	Colombia	NT	
	Domingo Aranguren	Venezuela	NT	
	Malcolm Fuentes	Venezuela	NT	
	Julio Quevedo	Guatemala	NT	
13	Víctor Tricoche	Puerto Rico	NT	
14	Benjamín Rodríguez	Puerto Rico	NT	
15	Pedro Mariani	Puerto Rico	NT	

=== 4 × 100 metres relay ===
12 January

Rank	Nation	Competitors	Time	Notes
1st place, gold medalist(s)	Venezuela	Clive Bonas, Lloyd Murad, Horacio Esteves, Rafael Romero	42.2 (42.14)	
2nd place, silver medalist(s)	Puerto Rico	Miguel Rivera, Rubén Díaz, Ramón Vega, Manuel Rivera	42.2 (42.27)	
3rd place, bronze medalist(s)	Panama	Luis Carter, Humberto Brown, Martín Francis, Manuel Rivas	42.8 (42.71)	
4	Mexico		43.7	
5	Jamaica	Dennis Johnson, Keswick Smalling, Deryck Taylor, Audley Hewitt	44.0	

=== 4 × 400 metres relay ===
12 January

Rank	Nation	Competitors	Time	Notes
1st place, gold medalist(s)	Puerto Rico	Frank Rivera, Manuel Rivera, Ovidio de Jesús, Iván Rodríguez	3:16.9 (3:16.91)	
2nd place, silver medalist(s)	Venezuela	Emilio Romero, Davis Welch, Guillermo Rocca, Evaristo Edie	3:22.8 (3:22.88)	
3rd place, bronze medalist(s)	Mexico	Rodolfo Ramírez, Oscar Fernández, Juan José Godínez, Jorge Terán	3:24.4 (3:24.46)	
4	Panama		3:25.5	

=== High jump ===
7 January

Rank	Name	Nationality	Result	Notes
1st place, gold medalist(s)	Teodoro Palacios	Guatemala	1.91	
2nd place, silver medalist(s)	Julio Llera	Puerto Rico	1.91	
3rd place, bronze medalist(s)	Roberto Procel	Mexico	1.89	
4	Gilberto Siritt	Venezuela	1.85	
5	Rafael Orta	Puerto Rico	1.85	
6	Francisco Acuña	Venezuela	1.82	
7	Leopoldo Vásquez	Mexico	1.77	
8	Edwin Conception	Netherlands Antilles	1.77	
9	Johnson Viviane	Venezuela	1.71	
10	Víctor Carmona	Puerto Rico	1.71	

=== Pole vault ===
9 January

Rank	Name	Nationality	Result	Notes
1st place, gold medalist(s)	Rolando Cruz	Puerto Rico	4.40	GR
2nd place, silver medalist(s)	Rubén Cruz	Puerto Rico	3.96	
3rd place, bronze medalist(s)	Miguel Rivera	Puerto Rico	3.79	
4	Brígido Iriarte	Venezuela	3.79	
5	Salvador Paredes	Venezuela	3.55	
6	Luis Padilla	Venezuela	3.40	

=== Long jump ===
8 January

Rank	Name	Nationality	Result	Notes
1st place, gold medalist(s)	Deryck Taylor	Jamaica	7.07	
2nd place, silver medalist(s)	Julio Llera	Puerto Rico	6.67	
3rd place, bronze medalist(s)	Jesús Piña	Venezuela	6.60	
4	Clive Bonas	Venezuela	6.60	
5	Héctor Román	Puerto Rico	6.55	
6	Roberto Procel	Mexico	6.54	
7	Gifford Archer	Panama	6.30	
8	Rodolfo Mijares	Mexico	6.25	
9	Pedro Planas	Venezuela	6.23	
10	Johnny Paradizo	Puerto Rico	6.07	

=== Triple jump ===
10 January

Rank	Name	Nationality	Result	Notes
1st place, gold medalist(s)	Pedro Camacho	Puerto Rico	14.67	
2nd place, silver medalist(s)	Rumildo Cruz	Puerto Rico	14.38	
3rd place, bronze medalist(s)	Julio Llera	Puerto Rico	14.32	
4	Hernán Caraballo	Venezuela	14.02	
5	Deryck Taylor	Jamaica	13.84	
6	José Lenin Rodríguez	Venezuela	13.54	

=== Shot put ===
8 January

Rank	Name	Nationality	Result	Notes
1st place, gold medalist(s)	Eduardo Adriana	Netherlands Antilles	14.59	GR
2nd place, silver medalist(s)	Ramón Rosario	Puerto Rico	14.48	
3rd place, bronze medalist(s)	Rafael Trompiz	Venezuela	14.00	
4	Pedro Nieves	Puerto Rico	13.85	
5	José María Bracho	Venezuela	13.80	
6	Raúl Matos	Puerto Rico	13.20	
7	Héctor Thomas	Venezuela	12.94	

=== Discus throw ===
9 January

Rank	Name	Nationality	Result	Notes
1st place, gold medalist(s)	Daniel Cereali	Venezuela	44.95	GR
2nd place, silver medalist(s)	Mauricio Rodríguez	Venezuela	42.27	
3rd place, bronze medalist(s)	Omar Fierro	Mexico	42.16	
4	Francisco Córcega	Venezuela	42.06	
5	Ramón Rosario	Puerto Rico	41.39	
6	Raúl Matos	Puerto Rico	39.51	
7	Francisco Estopier	Mexico	39.18	
8	Santiago Durham	Mexico	38.20	
9	Rubén Dávila	Puerto Rico	37.65	

=== Hammer throw ===
10 January

Rank	Name	Nationality	Result	Notes
1st place, gold medalist(s)	Daniel Cereali	Venezuela	51.17	GR
2nd place, silver medalist(s)	Rubén Dávila	Puerto Rico	46.86	
3rd place, bronze medalist(s)	Francisco Fragoso	Mexico	46.75	
4	Alejandro Rueda	Mexico	43.38	
5	Mauricio Rodríguez	Venezuela	42.57	
6	Ángel Vélez	Puerto Rico	42.54	
7	Mario González	Mexico	41.91	
8	Carlos Hidalgo	Puerto Rico	41.74	
9	Emérico Vanich	Venezuela	40.10	

=== Javelin throw ===
11 January – old model

Rank	Name	Nationality	Result	Notes
1st place, gold medalist(s)	Carlos Fajer	Mexico	62.36	
2nd place, silver medalist(s)	Santiago Durham	Mexico	59.65	
3rd place, bronze medalist(s)	Jesús Barbera	Venezuela	59.02	
4	Aníbal Arroyo	Venezuela	58.70	
5	Benigno Santiago	Puerto Rico	55.90	
6	Emilio Navarro	Puerto Rico	55.37	
7	Antonio Rubio	Venezuela	47.90	
8	Johnny Paradizo	Puerto Rico	46.68	

=== Pentathlon ===
12 January – 1952 tables

The highest mark recorded in each event is highlighted in yellow

Rank	Athlete	Nationality	LJ	JT	200m	DT	1500m	Points	Notes
1st place, gold medalist(s)	Rodolfo Mijares	Mexico	6.41	47.74	23.0	36.55	4:50.1	2723	
2nd place, silver medalist(s)	Héctor Román	Puerto Rico	6.73	52.43	23.0	38.93	6:07.4	2627	
3rd place, bronze medalist(s)	Héctor Thomas	Venezuela	6.81	48.48	23.4	35.75	5:27.0	2540	
4	Osmán Ludovic	Venezuela	6.40	51.47	22.8	34.43	5:35.5	2496	
5	Johnny Pradizo	Puerto Rico	6.45	52.88	24.3	34.12	5:07.1	2475	
6	Omar Fierro	Mexico	5.50	47.26	24.0	41.22	4:54.3	2451	
7	Leopoldo Vásquez	Mexico	6.48	48.78	24.1	31.47	4:57.9	2438	
8	Emilio Navarro	Puerto Rico	5.70	56.87	24.4	32.23	5:19.5	2245	
9	Orlando Stanley	Costa Rica	6.21	41.77	23.1	28.08	5:26.9	2124	
10	Pedro Alfonso Jérez	Guatemala	5.60	39.83	25.3	27.40	4:44.0	1937	
11	Eduardo Aburto	Nicaragua	4.96	38.96	26.0	21.15	5:09.6	?	
	Brígido Iriarte	Venezuela	6.05	54.26	?	–	–	DNF	

== Women's results ==
=== 100 metres ===
Heats – 9 January

Rank	Heat	Name	Nationality	Time	Notes
1	1	Jean Holmes	Panama	12.9	Q
2	1	María Teresa Treviño	Mexico	13.1	Q
3	1	Silvia Hunte	Panama	13.1	Q
4	1	Morella Ettedgui	Venezuela	13.3	
1	2	Yolanda Vincourt	Mexico	13.3	Q
2	2	Alvia Ford	Venezuela	13.4	Q
3	2	Raquel Trujillo	Mexico	13.4	Q
4	2	Marcela Daniel	Panama	13.8	
5	2	Biserka de Vanich	Venezuela	13.9	

Final – 10 January

Rank	Lane	Name	Nationality	Time	Notes
1st place, gold medalist(s)	3	Jean Holmes	Panama	12.8 (13.04)	
2nd place, silver medalist(s)	4	Yolanda Vincourt	Mexico	13.3 (13.31)	
3rd place, bronze medalist(s)	1	María Teresa Treviño	Mexico	13.4 (13.33)	
4	2	Silvia Hunte	Panama	13.4	
5	6	Raquel Trujillo	Mexico	13.9	
6	5	Alvia Ford	Venezuela	13.9	

=== 80 metres hurdles ===
Heats – 10 January

Rank	Heat	Name	Nationality	Time	Notes
1	1	Benilde Ascanio	Venezuela	12.9	Q
2	1	Silvia Hunte	Panama	13.0	Q
3	1	Gladys Azcuaga	Mexico	13.7	Q
4	1	Margarita Kabsch	Mexico	14.5	
1	2	Guillermina Peña	Mexico	13.3	Q
2	2	Nerva Matheus	Venezuela	13.3	Q
3	2	Lorraine Dunn	Panama	14.1	Q
	2	Biserka de Vanich	Venezuela	DNS	

Final – 11 January

Rank	Name	Nationality	Time	Notes
1st place, gold medalist(s)	Guillermina Peña	Mexico	12.9 (12.87)	
2nd place, silver medalist(s)	Benilde Ascanio	Venezuela	12.9 (12.92)	
3rd place, bronze medalist(s)	Silvia Hunte	Panama	13.4 (13.43)	
4	Lorraine Dunn	Panama	13.5	
5	Nerva Matheus	Venezuela	13.7	
6	Gladys Azcuaga	Mexico	14.0	

=== 4 × 100 metres relay ===
12 January

Rank	Nation	Competitors	Time	Notes
1st place, gold medalist(s)	Panama	Marcela Daniel, Lorraine Dunn, Silvia Hunte, Jean Holmes	50.5 (50.51)	
2nd place, silver medalist(s)	Mexico	Guillermina Peña, Raquel Trujillo, María Teresa Treviño, Yolanda Vincourt	51.7 (51.81)	
3rd place, bronze medalist(s)	Venezuela	Benilde Ascanio, Alvia Ford, Biserka de Vanich, Morella Ettedgui	53.2 (53.26)	

=== High jump ===
8 January

Rank	Name	Nationality	Result	Notes
1st place, gold medalist(s)	Benilde Ascanio	Venezuela	1.43	
2nd place, silver medalist(s)	Margarita Kabsch	Mexico	1.40	
3rd place, bronze medalist(s)	Silvia Hunte	Panama	1.40	
4	Diana Gerling	Mexico	1.37	
5	Teresa Meléndez	Venezuela	1.32	
6	Gladys Azcuaga	Mexico	1.32	
7	Lorraine Dunn	Panama	1.32	
8	Alvia Ford	Venezuela	1.32	

=== Discus throw ===
7 January

Rank	Name	Nationality	Result	Notes
1st place, gold medalist(s)	Lili Schluter	Mexico	40.79	GR
2nd place, silver medalist(s)	Ivonne Rojano	Mexico	37.19	
3rd place, bronze medalist(s)	Nerva Matheus	Venezuela	31.04	
4	Bertha Chiú	Mexico	30.74	
5	Mercedes García	Venezuela	30.65	
6	Francisca Roberts	Venezuela	29.10	

=== Javelin throw ===
10 January – old model

Rank	Name	Nationality	Result	Notes
1st place, gold medalist(s)	Berta Chiú	Mexico	35.21	
2nd place, silver medalist(s)	Raquel Trujillo	Mexico	35.14	
3rd place, bronze medalist(s)	Mercedes García	Venezuela	34.75	
4	Ana Mercedes Campos	El Salvador	34.39	
5	Nelly Romero	Venezuela	31.34	
6	Ivonne Rojano	Mexico	28.79	
