= Jim Lea (sprinter) =

American sprinter

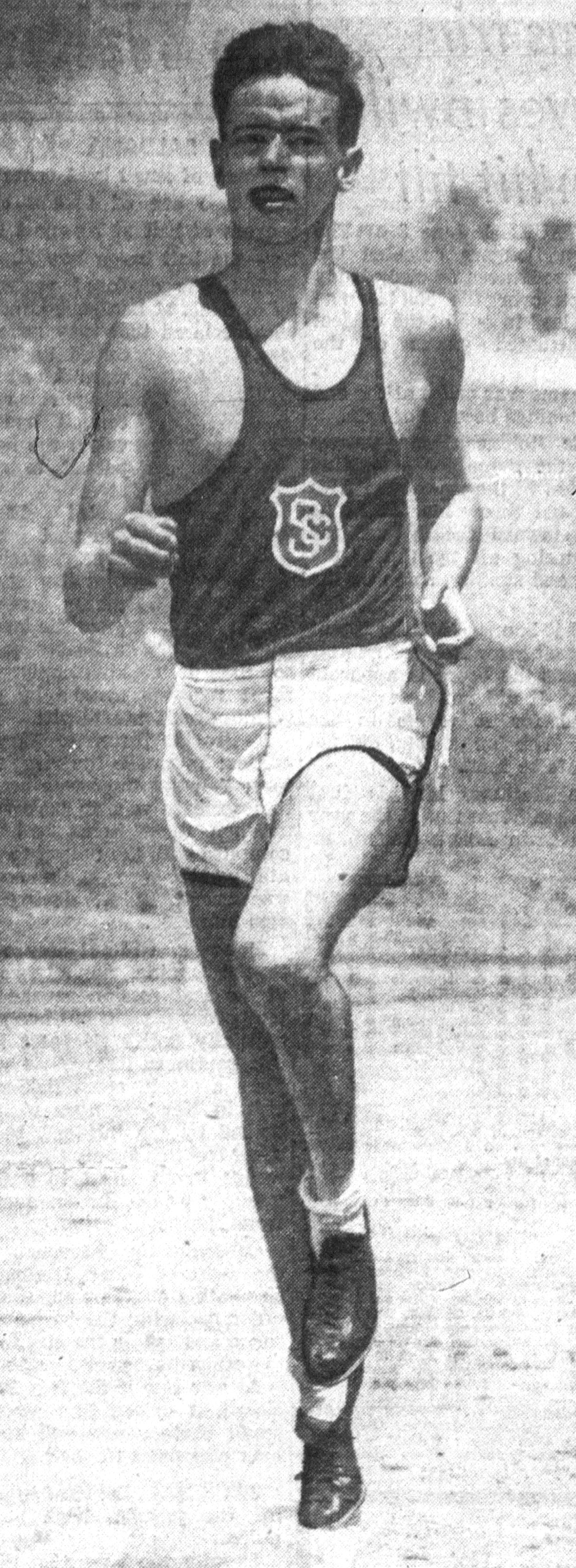
Lea, circa 1954

Jim Lea (November 6, 1932 – March 27, 2010) was an American sprinter who competed in the 1956 Summer Olympics. Lea represented the US Air Force as a runner.

Competing for the USC Trojans track and field team, Lea won the 1953 and 1954 NCAA Track and Field Championships in the 440 yards.

Lea competed in the 1955 Pan Am Games, where both Lea and Louis Jones beat the previous world records in the 400 meters, with Jones winning the race. Commentators credited these two record-breaking performances to the high altitude in Mexico City, where they competed.

Lea qualified for the Olympics at the Armed Forces track and field championship. Experts at the time considered Lea one of the best prospects for an olympic medal for the United States. Lea once again competed against Jones, and once again Jones won, breaking his own world record in the process. Despite this, both Jones and Lea did poorly in the 1956 Olympics and neither won a medal.

Lea struggled with nerves before competition, and reportedly panicked before every one of them. Before his Olympics competition, he suffered a nervous skin rash.
