= Ramón Vega =

Puerto Rican sprinter

Personal information
- Nationality: Puerto Rican
- Born: 1 November 1939 Juana Díaz, Puerto Rico
- Died: 6 September 2007 (aged 67) Juana Díaz, Puerto Rico
- Height: 1.73 m (5 ft 8 in)
- Weight: 65 kg (143 lb)

Sport
- Sport: Sprinting
- Event: 200 metres

Ramón Luis Vega Zayas (1 November 1939 – 6 September 2007) was a Puerto Rican sprinter. He competed in the men's 200 metres at the 1960 Summer Olympics.

== International competitions ==
Year	Competition	Venue	Position	Event	Notes
Representing Puerto Rico
1959	Central American and Caribbean Games	Caracas, Venezuela	6th (h)	100 m	10.8
1959	Central American and Caribbean Games	Caracas, Venezuela	7th (h)	200 m	22.5
1959	Central American and Caribbean Games	Caracas, Venezuela	2nd	4 × 100 m relay	42.27
1959	Pan American Games	Chicago, United States	12th (h)	100 m	10.9
1959	Pan American Games	Chicago, United States	5th	200 m	21.3
1959	Pan American Games	Chicago, United States	5th	4 × 100 m relay	41.7
1959	Pan American Games	Chicago, United States	3rd	4 × 400 m relay	3:12.4
1960	Olympic Games	Rome, Italy	30th (h)	200 m	21.8
1960	Olympic Games	Rome, Italy	14th (h)	4 × 400 m relay	3:13.91
1962	Central American and Caribbean Games	Kingston, Jamaica	9th (h)	100 m	10.7^{1}

^{1}Did not start in the semifinals

== Personal bests ==
- 200 metres – 21.3h (1959)
