= Rafael Domínguez (athlete) =

Dominican Republic sprinter

Personal information
- Nationality: Dominican
- Born: 11 November 1941 (age 84) Santiago de los Caballeros, Dominican Republic
- Height: 1.55 m (5 ft 1 in)
- Weight: 68 kg (150 lb)

Sport
- Sport: Sprinting
- Event: 4 × 100 metres relay

Rafael Domínguez (born 11 November 1941) is a Dominican Republic sprinter. He competed in the men's 4 × 100 metres relay at the 1968 Summer Olympics.

== International competitions ==
Year	Competition	Venue	Position	Event	Notes
Representing the Dominican Republic
1962	Central American and Caribbean Games	Kingston, Jamaica	26th (h)	100 m	11.4
1968	Olympic Games	Mexico City, Mexico	18th (h)	4 × 100 m relay	41.4
