= Bill Woodhouse =

William Woodhouse (December 11, 1936 – January 9, 2014) was an American sprinter. He won the gold medal in the 4 × 100 metres relay at the 1959 Pan American Games.

Woodhouse competed for the Abilene Christian Wildcats track and field team in the NCAA.
