= Frank Rivera (athlete) =

Personal information
- Full name: Francisco "Frank" Rivera Paniagua
- Nationality: Puerto Rican
- Born: 9 March 1928 San Juan, Puerto Rico
- Died: 31 October 2013 (aged 85) San Juan, Puerto Rico

Sport
- Sport: Sprinting
Medal record
Men's Athletics
Representing Puerto Rico
1959 Central American and Caribbean Games
Gold medal – first place	1959 Caracas	4x400 m relay

Francisco "Frank" Rivera Paniagua (9 March 1928 – 31 October 2013) was a Puerto Rican sprinter who competed in the 1952 Summer Olympics and in the 1956 Summer Olympics. He won a bronze medal in the 1959 Pan American Games 4×400 metres relay. He was born in San Juan, Puerto Rico. Died in 2013 in San Juan. Served as a Corporal in the United States Marine Corps in Korea. He was buried at the Puerto Rico National Cemetery in Bayamón, Puerto Rico.

== International competitions ==
Year	Competition	Venue	Position	Event	Notes
Representing Puerto Rico
1950	Central American and Caribbean Games	Guatemala City, Guatemala	3rd	800 m	2:01.1
1952	Olympic Games	Helsinki, Finland	39th (h)	400 m	49.48
1952	Olympic Games	Helsinki, Finland	43rd (h)	800 m	1:57.6
1954	Central American and Caribbean Games	Mexico City, Mexico	5th	400 m	48.6
1954	Central American and Caribbean Games	Mexico City, Mexico	4th	800 m	1:57.7
1954	Central American and Caribbean Games	Mexico City, Mexico	2nd	4 × 400 m relay	3:17.70
1955	Pan American Games	Mexico City, Mexico	9th	400 m	NT
1955	Pan American Games	Mexico City, Mexico	4th	800 m	48.37
1955	Pan American Games	Mexico City, Mexico	4th	4 × 400 m relay	3:16.38
1956	Olympic Games	Melbourne, Australia	31st (h)	800 m	1:56.4
1956	Olympic Games	Melbourne, Australia	12th (h)	4 × 400 m relay	3:13.8
1959	Central American and Caribbean Games	Caracas, Venezuela	4th	400 m	50.3
1959	Central American and Caribbean Games	Caracas, Venezuela	4th	400 m	1:59.0
1959	Central American and Caribbean Games	Caracas, Venezuela	1st	4 × 400 m relay	3:16.91
