= George Short (athlete) =

Canadian sprinter

Personal information
- Born: 5 May 1941 (age 85) Saskatoon, Saskatchewan, Canada
- Height: 188 cm (6 ft 2 in)
- Weight: 86 kg (190 lb)
- Football career

Profile
- Position: Halfback

Career information
- High school: Bedford Road Collegiate (Saskatoon, Saskatchewan)
- College: Iowa (1960); Oregon State (1961)
- University: Alberta (1962–1964); Calgary (1967); Windsor (1969)
- CFL draft: 1964: 4th round, 31st overall pick

Career history
- 1965: Calgary Stampeders*
- * Offseason or practice squad member only

Awards and highlights
- First-team All-Canadian (1969)

Sport
- Sport: Sprinting
- Event: 100 metres

George Douglas Short (born 5 May 1941) is a Canadian former sprinter and football player. From Saskatoon, he began competing in track and field in high school and won the Saskatchewan championships in two events in 1958. The following year, he the national high school record in the 100-yard dash and participated in the 1959 Pan American Games in three events, with a best finish of sixth in the 4 × 100 metres relay. He set the Saskatchewan record in the 100 metres in the Olympic trials and then competed in the men's 100 metres and the 4 × 100 metres relay at the 1960 Summer Olympics.

Also a football player in high school, Short was a member of the national champion Saskatoon Hilltops junior team in 1959 and enrolled at the University of Iowa in 1960 to compete in track and play for the Iowa Hawkeyes football team. After being the leading scorer for Iowa's freshman football team, he transferred to Oregon State University in 1961, before returning to Canada in 1962 and joining the University of Alberta, where he played football. He was selected in the fourth round of the 1964 CFL draft by the Calgary Stampeders and retired from track to focus on football, signing with the Stampeders in 1965, though he did not make the team. Short continued playing football while studying at the University of Calgary in 1967 and at the University of Windsor in 1969, receiving selection as first-team All-Canadian with the latter. After his graduation from Windsor, he served many years as an administrator at Sir George Williams University and then Concordia University. Short is an inductee to the Saskatchewan Sports Hall of Fame.

== Early life ==
Short was born on 5 May 1941 in Saskatoon, Saskatchewan. He attended Bedford Road Collegiate where he competed in football and track and field. He started training in track for the first time in 1958, at age 17, and quickly showed talent. That year, he participated at the Saskatchewan Open Track and Field Championships and became the champion in the 100 metres and the 220-yard dash, qualifying for the Canadian national championships. The same year, he was a top player for the football team along with his friend, future CFL player Dale West, and led them to a victory at the provincial championship.

At an unsanctioned meet in 1959, Short ran a time of 9.8 seconds in the 100-yard dash, the national record for high school students. Then, at the provincial championships, Short set Saskatchewan junior records in the 100-yard and 200-yard dashes while also winning the 40-yard dash. At the national championships, he won the 100- and 220-yard dash events, setting junior national record in the former with a time of 9.9 seconds. At that year's trials for the Pan American Games, Short won three medals – a bronze (200 metres), a silver (100 metres) and a gold (4 × 100 relay). He qualified to compete in each of these events at the 1959 Pan American Games, failing to advance from his heat in the 100 and 200 while finishing sixth in the relay. Short also remained active in football, playing junior football for the Saskatoon Hilltops and helping them to the Manitoba–Saskatchewan Junior League championship title and then the national title.

== Olympics ==
At the 1960 Canadian Olympic trials, Short won the semifinals with a time of 10.2 seconds, which would have been a national record, but was unable to be recorded due to there being wind of four miles per hour. In the finals, he placed third, behind Lynn Eves and Harry Jerome, who had a world-record time of 10.0 seconds. Short's time of 10.5 seconds in the finals set a Saskatchewan record. He thus qualified for the Olympics, competing in the 100 metres and the 4 × 100 metres relay. Describing his career, he later recalled that he "came out of nowhere" and said that he had much less experience and training than others. Short had a discussion with famed coach Ducky Drake at the Olympics, telling the Star-Phoenix that: "He said 'How many meets have you been in? Most of my guys have been in 35 or 40.' I told him I was in two high school meets, the provincial meet and the Olympic trials. He said, 'And you're at the Olympic Games?'" In the 100m at the Olympics, Short failed to advance from his heat with a time of 10.9, while in the relay, he was part of a team that reached the semifinals and set a national record with a time of 41.1 seconds.

== Football career ==
Later that year, Short decided to enroll at the University of Iowa in the U.S. on a track and American football scholarship. He had decided to go Iowa after a chance encounter with Deacon Jones, who competed there, at the Olympic Village. He was the fastest player on Iowa's freshman football team in 1960 and finished as their leading scorer. Short transferred to Oregon State University in 1961 and trained with the Oregon State Beavers football team, though he was ineligible to play due to transfer rules. That same year, he participated at the Saskatchewan track championships and won three events – the 100-, 220- and 440-yard dashes – while setting records in the latter two.

In 1962, Short left Oregon State and enrolled at the University of Alberta to play collegiate Canadian football for the Alberta Golden Bears. After two seasons there, he was drafted by the Calgary Stampeders of the Canadian Football League in the fourth round (31st overall) of the 1964 CFL draft. He competed at the 1964 Western Canadian track championships, winning silver in the 400 metres and a gold medal in the 4 × 400m relay. Short later announced his retirement to focus solely on football. He recalled at an event in qualifying for the 1964 Olympics, "I was sitting next to my coach, Ron Perkins of Saskatoon, taking off my track shoes after a race and leaned over on him and said, 'Ron, that's the last time I'm going to run.' I don't know what it was, but I just knew that was it." After a third season of football at Alberta in 1964, he signed with the Stampeders in May 1965. However, he later left the team in July at the start of the season. He later explained that "I was cut during camp ... without any explanation. It was quite a blow. I really wanted to play professional football".

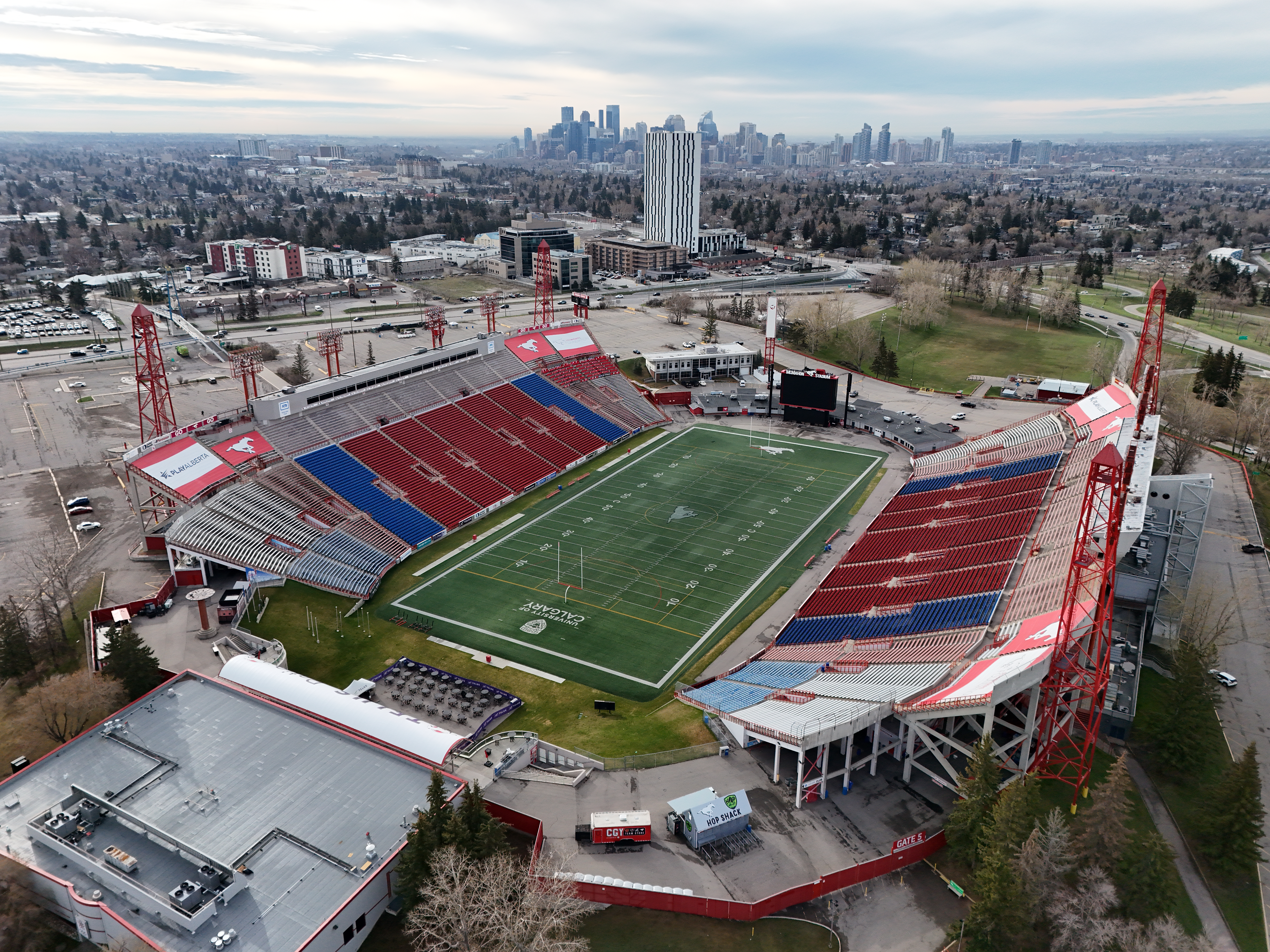
McMahon Stadium, where Short played football with the Calgary Dinos

Short later attended the University of Calgary and returned to playing football, spending the 1967 season with the Calgary Dinos. He received a Bachelor of Education degree from Calgary, already having a Bachelor of Physical Education from the University of Alberta. After graduating from Calgary, he enrolled at the University of Windsor studying for a master's degree and joined the Windsor Lancers football team, at 28 years old. He recorded five interceptions and helped them win the Central Canada Intercollegiate Football Conference title while being named first-team All-Canadian for his performance. Short was claimed by the Stampeders in 1969, but then released by them in February 1970.

== Later life ==
Short started living in Windsor, Ontario, in 1969, and eventually graduated from the University of Windsor with a master's degree in physical education. At the same time, he worked as director of physical education for Sandwich High School and served six years as their coach in football and track and field, later adding the duties of wrestling coach and basketball coach. In 1973, he was named athletic director at Sir George Williams University. After Sir George Williams merged with Loyola College to create Concordia University in 1974, Short became assistant athletic director. He briefly coached wrestling and soccer at Concordia, but he later said he realized that "I was never meant to be a coach". He moved to graduate sports administration in 1978 and later became the school's director of sports administration in 1987. Short served a total of 31 years working at Concordia in the positions of athletic administrator and director of the graduate program in sport administration. He has also ran several sports programs, starting with a soccer camp in 1984, under the brand "Future Stars". He was inducted into the Saskatoon Sports Hall of Fame in 1989, into the Saskatchewan Sports Hall of Fame in 1998, and into the University of Windsor Sports Hall of Fame. Short married and had two daughters.
