= Ray Norton =

American sprinter (born 1937)

Personal information
- Nationality: American
- Born: September 22, 1937 (age 89) Tulsa, Oklahoma, U.S.
- Height: 1.88 m (6 ft 2 in)
- Weight: 81 kg (179 lb)

Sport
- Sport: Sprint running
- College team: San Jose State College
- Club: Santa Clara Valley Youth Village
Medal record
Representing the United States
Pan American Games
Gold medal – first place	1959 Chicago	100 metres
Gold medal – first place	1959 Chicago	200 metres
Gold medal – first place	1959 Chicago	4×100 m

Otis Ray Norton (born September 22, 1937) is a former American sprinter who competed in the 1960 Olympics in Rome.

As a top-ranked sprinter, Norton's speed was highly coveted by the San Francisco 49ers of the National Football League (NFL), who attempted with very limited success to convert Norton from track to football. He played parts of the 1960 and 1961 seasons for the team.

== Track career ==
After graduating high school in 1955, Norton initially went to Oakland City College staying for just one year. He left in 1956 for San Jose State College, where he was coached by Lloyd (Bud) Winter. He first achieved national fame by equalling the world record of 9.3 for 100 y as a college junior, in San Jose on April 12, 1958. The next year, 1959, was an outstanding one. He won three gold medals at the 1959 Pan American Games and he tied Leamon King's record at the 100 m at 10.1 s in San Jose on April 18. His achievements in 1959 were recognised by being voted Track and Field News's United States Men's Athlete of the Year – the inaugural award of this honour.

In 1960, Norton carried on his impressive form of the previous year by tying four world records: he equalled the 220 y record of 20.6 s in Berkeley on March 19; equalled again the 100 y record of 9.3 s in San Jose on April 2; equalled the 200 m record of 20.6 s in Philadelphia on April 30; and equalled the newly set record for the 200 m of 20.5 s in Stanford on July 2. He qualified for the 100 and 200 at the 1960 Olympics by coming first in both events at the United States Olympic Trials, equalling the world record in the process in the 200 m. Unfortunately, he suffered an injury three weeks before the games and fell out of condition during his recovery, finishing a disappointing last in both the 100 and 200 m finals. This injury was not reported in the press at the time due to Norton's hope of being drafted by the NFL in the near future.

Norton's failure on Thursday September 1 in the 100 m was one of such disasters that befell American favorites that day and the day was to become known as 'Black Thursday'. He tried to make amends for his failures in the individual events in the 4 × 100 m relay. The team of Frank Budd, Norton, Stone Johnson and Dave Sime finished first in a world record time of 39.4 s but were disqualified because at the first exchange from Budd to Norton, Norton started too early and the exchange happened outside the changeover box. The West German team who finished second in 39.5 s received the gold medals and became the new world record holders. Norton came to the attention of the world's press at the Olympics for more than his athletic tribulations when he was seen courting his fellow American sprint star and public favorite Wilma Rudolph.

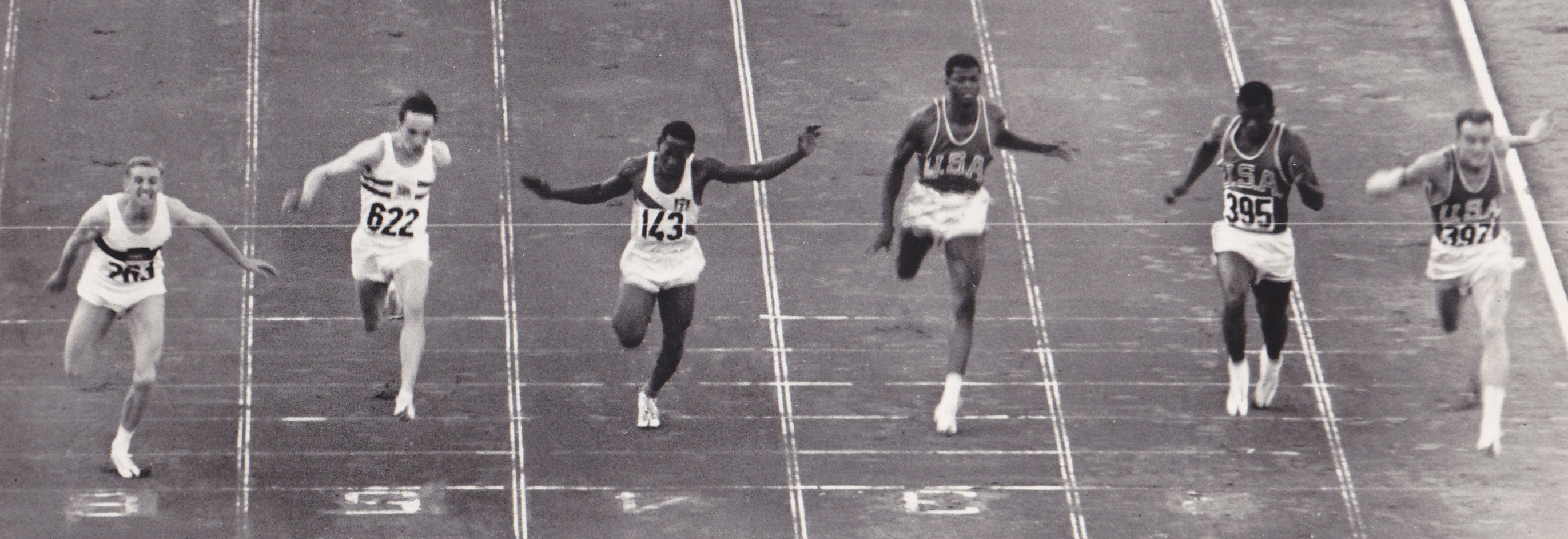
100 m final at the 1960 Olympics, Norton is 3rd from right

Early in 1960, college and the social work degree he was working on. Norton continued to train at the San Clara Valley Youth Village. Norton retired from athletics that season and was drafted as an American football player at the end of that year.

== Rankings ==
Norton was ranked among the best in the US and the world in both the 100 and 200 m sprint events between 1958 and 1960, according to the votes of the experts of Track and Field News.

100 meters
Year	World rank	US rank
1958	4th	3rd
1959	1st	1st
1960	2nd	1st

200 meters
Year	World rank	US rank
1958	4th	3rd
1959	1st	1st
1960	2nd	1st

== USA Championships ==
Norton competed at the USA national championships.

USA Championships
Year	100m	200m
1958	6th	5th
1959	1st	1st
1960	1st	1st

== Football career ==
Ray Norton
- Hall of Famer Y.A. Tittle hands off to Norton

No. 23
- Position: Halfback

Career information
- High school: McClymonds (Oakland, California)
- College: San Jose State
- NFL draft: 1960: 4th round, 46th overall pick

Career history
- San Francisco 49ers (1960–1961)

Career NFL statistics
- Games played: 9
- Starts: 0
- Rushing attempts: 4
- Rushing yards: 0
- Touchdowns: 0
- Stats at Pro Football Reference

In 1960, in an effort to bring world-class speed to the National Football League (NFL), the San Francisco 49ers signed "world's fastest man" Norton to a free agent contract to play flanker. Due to the ongoing 1960 Olympic Games, he was not able to report to the team until late in the preseason training camp process and he was not activated from the "taxi squad" until after the fifth game of the season. He ultimately saw action for only a few minutes during the year, carrying the ball two times — once for a 9-yard gain and once for a loss of 7.

He was converted to halfback during the 1961 preseason. The experiment initially seemed promising, with Norton scoring a preseason touchdown on a 29-yard run against the New York Giants as part of a 60-yard game, but the late-summer magic never translated to the regular season. After just two games of the 1961 season, the Norton experiment seemed to be over, when he was waived by the 49ers on September 26.

"It was kind of shocking," Norton said at the time of his release, "I thought I had a good chance to make it."

According to the team, the immediate cause of Norton's release was the need to create roster space for 49er veterans ready to return from the injured list. Norton, a Bay area resident, continued to attend games, sitting on the 49ers bench in street clothes, amidst media speculation that the speedster might be resigned later in the season.

When 49ers receiver Clyde Conner went down to injury, the door was again opened for Norton, who was brought back to the team on November 10.

Norton managed to return one kickoff 60 yards but fumbling another against the Chicago Bears, while proving wholly ineffective as a ball-carrier. For the year Norton ran with the ball just twice, for a net of negative 2 yards.

== Later life ==
In 1966, Norton sought the nomination to sit as a Republican for the California Assembly 17th District (Oakland and Berkeley). At the time he was working as a partner in a service agency for attorneys.

Ray currently resides in Napa, California.
