= Athletics at the 1959 Pan American Games =

- Dates: 28 August – 2 September
- Host city: Chicago, United States
- Venue: Soldier Field
- Level: Senior
- Events: 32
- Participation: 286 athletes from 19 nations

The athletics competition in the 1959 Pan American Games were held in Chicago, United States.

== Medal summary ==
=== Men's events ===
Event	Gold		Silver		Bronze	
100 metres (wind: +2.7 m/s)	Ray Norton; United States	10.3w	Mike Agostini; West Indies	10.4w	Enrique Figuerola; Cuba	10.5w
200 metres	Ray Norton; United States	20.6w	Les Carney; United States	21.1w	Mike Agostini; West Indies	21.1w
400 metres	George Kerr; West Indies	46.1	Basil Ince; West Indies	46.4	Malcolm Spence; West Indies	46.6
800 metres	Tom Murphy; United States	1:49.4	George Kerr; West Indies	1:49.4	Tony Seth; British Guiana	1:49.7
1500 metres	Dyrol Burleson; United States	3:49.1	Jim Grelle; United States	3:49.9	Ed Moran; United States	3:50.1
5000 metres	Bill Dellinger; United States	14:28.4	Osvaldo Suárez; Argentina	14:28.6	Doug Kyle; Canada	14:33.0
10,000 metres	Osvaldo Suárez; Argentina	30:17.2	Doug Kyle; Canada	30:18.0	Bob Soth; United States	30:21.8
Marathon	John J. Kelley; United States	2:27:55	Jim Green; United States	2:32:17	Gordon Dickson; Canada	2:36:19
110 metres hurdles (wind: +2.5 m/s)	Hayes Jones; United States	13.6w	Lee Calhoun; United States	13.7w	Elias Gilbert; United States	14.0w
400 metres hurdles	Josh Culbreath; United States	51.2	Dick Howard; United States	51.3	Cliff Cushman; United States	53.0
3000 metres steeplechase	Phil Coleman; United States	8:56.4	Charles "Deacon" Jones; United States	8:56.6	Alfredo Tinoco; Mexico	8:58.0
4 × 100 metres relay	United States; Hayes Jones; Robert Poynter; William Woodhouse; Ray Norton	40.4	Venezuela; Emilio Romero; Lloyd Murad; Clive Bonas; Rafael Romero	41.1	West Indies; Dennis Johnson; Clifton Bertrand; Wilton Jackson; Mike Agostini	41.1
4 × 400 metres relay	West Indies; Mal Spence; Mel Spence; Basil Ince; George Kerr	3:05.3	United States; Eddie Southern; Josh Culbreath; Jack Yerman; Dave Mills	3:05.8	Puerto Rico; Ramón Vega; Jossué Delgado; Manuel Rivera; Iván Rodríguez	3:12.4
High jump	Charles Dumas; United States	2.10	Bob Gardner; United States	2.03	Ernle Haisley; West Indies	2.00
Pole vault	Don Bragg; United States	4.62	Jim Graham; United States	4.32	Rolando Cruz; Puerto Rico	4.32
Long jump	Irvin "Bo" Roberson; United States	7.97	Greg Bell; United States	7.60	Lester Bird; West Indies	7.46
Triple jump	Adhemar da Silva; Brazil	15.90	Herman Stokes; United States	15.39	Bill Sharpe; United States	15.25
Shot put	Parry O'Brien; United States	19.04	Dallas Long; United States	18.51	Dave Davis; United States	17.01
Discus throw	Al Oerter; United States	58.12	Dick Cochran; United States	54.44	Parry O'Brien; United States	51.84
Hammer throw	Al Hall; United States	59.71	Hal Connolly; United States	59.67	Bob Backus; United States	59.55
Javelin throw	Buster Quist; United States	70.50	Phil Conley; United States	69.94	Al Cantello; United States	69.82
Decathlon	Dave Edstrom; United States	7254	Phil Mulkey; United States	6062	George Stulac; Canada	5989

=== Women's events ===
Event	Gold		Silver		Bronze	
60 metres (wind: +3.6 m/s)	Isabelle Daniels; United States	7.4	Barbara Jones; United States	7.4	Carlota Gooden; Panama	7.4
100 metres (wind: -1.1 m/s)	Lucinda Williams; United States	12.1	Wilma Rudolph; United States	12.3	Carlota Gooden; Panama	12.3
200 metres (wind: +0.9 m/s)	Lucinda Williams; United States	24.2	Isabelle Daniels; United States	24.8	Sally McCallum; Canada	25.1
80 metres hurdles (wind: +1.8 m/s)	Bertha Díaz; Cuba	11.2	Wanda dos Santos; Brazil	11.5	Marian Munroe; Canada	11.5
4 × 100 metres relay	United States; Isabelle Daniels; Wilma Rudolph; Lucinda Williams; Barbara Jones	46.4	Panama; Marcela Daniel; Jean Holmes-Mitchell; Carlota Gooden; Silvia Hunte	48.2	Canada; Heather Campbell; Maureen Rever; Sally McCallum; Valerie Jerome	48.5
High jump	Ann Marie Flynn; United States	1.61	Renata Friedrichs; Chile Alice Whitty; Canada	1.50	Not Awarded	
Long jump	Annie Smith; United States	5.74	Margaret Matthews; United States	5.73	Willye White; United States	5.70
Shot put	Earlene Brown; United States	14.68	Sharon Shepherd; United States	13.48	Wanda Wejzgrowicz; United States	13.10
Discus throw	Earlene Brown; United States	49.31	Pamela Kurrell; United States	42.19	Marjorie Larney; United States	42.18
Javelin throw	Marlene Ahrens; Chile	45.38	Marjorie Larney; United States	43.65	Amelia Wood; United States	42.96

== Medal table ==
Rank	Nation	Gold	Silver	Bronze	Total
1	United States (USA)	26	23	13	62
2	West Indies	2	3	5	10
3	Argentina (ARG)	1	1	0	2
3	Brazil (BRA)	1	1	0	2
3	Chile (CHI)	1	1	0	2
6	Cuba (CUB)	1	0	1	2
7	Canada (CAN)	0	2	6	8
8	Panama (PAN)	0	2	1	3
9	Venezuela (VEN)	0	1	0	1
10	Puerto Rico (PUR)	0	0	2	2
11	British Guiana	0	0	1	1
11	Mexico (MEX)	0	0	1	1
Totals (12 entries)		32	34	30	96

== Participating nations ==
- Argentina (9)
- Brazil (27)
- British Guiana (7)
- British West Indies (11)
- Canada (30)
- Chile (22)
- Cuba (13)
- Dominican Republic (4)
- Ecuador (7)
- Guatemala (5)
- Haiti (2)
- Mexico (28)
- Netherlands Antilles (1)
- Panama (6)
- Peru (5)
- Puerto Rico (16)
- United States (78)
- Uruguay (2)
- Venezuela (13)
