= 1960 Ibero-American Games – Results =

These are the results of the 1960 Ibero-American Games which took place at the Estadio Nacional in Santiago, Chile, between 11 and 16 October.

== Men's results ==
=== 100 metres ===
Heats – 12 October

Rank	Heat	Name	Nationality	Time	Notes
1	1	Enrique Figuerola	Cuba	10.3	Q
2	1	Luis Vienna	Argentina	10.7	Q
3	1	Rubén Díaz	Puerto Rico	10.8	Q
4	1	Sydney Dobbs	Panama	10.9	
5	1	Guillermo Martínez	Ecuador	11.4	
6	1	Rigoberto Portillo	Paraguay	11.7	
1	2	Rafael Romero	Venezuela	10.4	Q
2	2	João Pires Sobrinho	Brazil	10.7	Q
3	2	Alberto Keitel	Chile	10.7	Q
4	2	Rodolfo Mijares	Mexico	11.1	
5	2	Guillermo Bahler	Argentina	11.3	
6	2	Apolinar Flores	Paraguay	11.3	
1	3	Horacio Esteves	Venezuela	10.5	Q
2	3	Affonso da Silva	Brazil	10.7	Q
3	3	Luis Carter	Panama	10.7	Q
4	3	José Luis Albarrán	Spain	10.9	
5	3	Juan Francisco Aguilar	Uruguay	11.2	
1	4	René Ahumada	Mexico	10.5	Q
2	4	Melanio Asensio	Spain	10.8	Q
3	4	Manuel Rivera	Puerto Rico	10.8	Q
4	4	Noel Revello	Uruguay	10.9	
5	4	Juan Enrique Byers	Chile	11.1	
6	4	José Ribadeneira	Ecuador	11.4	

Semifinals – 12 October

Rank	Heat	Name	Nationality	Time	Notes
1	1	Horacio Esteves	Venezuela	10.5	Q
2	1	Enrique Figuerola	Cuba	10.5	Q
3	1	Luis Vienna	Argentina	10.5	Q
4	1	Affonso da Silva	Brazil	10.6	
5	1	Luis Carter	Panama	10.9	
6	1	Rubén Díaz	Puerto Rico	11.0	
1	2	Rafael Romero	Venezuela	10.5	Q
2	2	João Pires Sobrinho	Brazil	10.6	Q
3	2	René Ahumada	Mexico	10.6	Q
4	2	Alberto Keitel	Chile	10.7	
5	2	Melanio Asensio	Spain	10.8	
6	2	Manuel Rivera	Puerto Rico	11.0	

Final – 13 October

Rank	Name	Nationality	Time	Notes
1st place, gold medalist(s)	Rafael Romero	Venezuela	10.3	
2nd place, silver medalist(s)	Horacio Esteves	Venezuela	10.4	
3rd place, bronze medalist(s)	Luis Vienna	Argentina	10.5	
4	René Ahumada	Mexico	10.8	
	João Pires Sobrinho	Brazil	DQ	
	Enrique Figuerola	Cuba	DNS	

=== 200 metres ===
Heats – 15 October

Rank	Heat	Name	Nationality	Time	Notes
1	1	Lloyd Murad	Venezuela	21.7	Q
2	1	José Luis Albarrán	Spain	21.7	Q
3	1	Benito Morales	Paraguay	22.4	Q
4	1	Juan Francisco Aguilar	Uruguay	22.6	
5	1	Guillermo Bahler	Argentina	22.7	
6	1	Sidney Dobbs	Panama	22.8	
1	2	Rafael Romero	Venezuela	21.5	Q
2	2	Gerardo Bönnhoff	Argentina	22.0	Q
3	2	René Ahumada	Mexico	22.1	Q
4	2	José Luis González	Spain	22.6	q
5	2	Apolinar Flores	Paraguay	22.7	
1	3	José Luis Villalongo	Puerto Rico	21.8	Q
2	3	Affonso da Silva	Brazil	22.1	Q
3	3	Fernando Castro	Portugal	22.4	Q
4	3	Gonzalo González	Mexico	22.6	q
5	3	Eduardo Krumm	Chile	22.7	
1	4	José Telles da Conceição	Brazil	21.8	Q
2	4	Alberto Keitel	Chile	22.0	Q
3	4	Luis Carter	Panama	22.3	Q
4	4	Carlos Pereira	Uruguay	22.8	
5	4	José Neves da Silva	Portugal	23.0	
6	4	Rafael Arcos	Ecuador	23.2	

Semifinals – 15 October

Rank	Heat	Name	Nationality	Time	Notes
1	1	Rafael Romero	Venezuela	20.9	Q
2	1	José Luis Villalongo	Puerto Rico	21.4	Q
3	1	José Luis Albarrán	Spain	21.6	Q
4	1	Affonso da Silva	Brazil	21.7	
5	1	Gerardo Bönnhoff	Argentina	21.7	
6	1	Fernando Castro	Portugal	22.1	
7	1	José Luis González	Spain	22.4	
1	2	José Telles da Conceição	Brazil	21.4	Q
2	2	Lloyd Murad	Venezuela	21.5	Q
3	2	Alberto Keitel	Chile	21.6	Q
4	2	René Ahumada	Mexico	21.7	
5	2	Luis Carter	Panama	22.2	
6	2	Benito Morales	Paraguay	22.4	
7	2	Gonzalo González	Mexico	22.5	

Final – 16 October

Rank	Name	Nationality	Time	Notes
1st place, gold medalist(s)	Rafael Romero	Venezuela	20.8	
2nd place, silver medalist(s)	José Telles da Conceição	Brazil	21.5	
3rd place, bronze medalist(s)	Lloyd Murad	Venezuela	21.5	
4	Alberto Keitel	Chile	21.7	
5	José Luis Villalongo	Puerto Rico	21.9	
6	José Luis Albarrán	Spain	21.9	

=== 400 metres ===
Heats – 12 October

Rank	Heat	Name	Nationality	Time	Notes
1	1	Humberto Brown	Panama	47.6	Q
2	1	José Luis Villalongo	Puerto Rico	48.1	Q
3	1	Anubes da Silva	Brazil	48.6	q
4	1	Víctor Lozano	Argentina	50.3	
5	1	Benito Morales	Paraguay	53.4	
1	2	René Ahumada	Mexico	49.1	Q
2	2	José Luis Martínez	Spain	49.7	Q
3	2	Carlos Pereira	Uruguay	50.6	
4	2	José Gallegos	Chile	50.6	
5	2	José Carreras	Ecuador	52.0	
1	3	Hortensio Fucil	Venezuela	49.0	Q
2	3	Julio León	Chile	49.1	Q
3	3	Valentim Baptista	Portugal	49.4	
4	3	Eulogio Gómez	Peru	49.5	
5	3	Apolinar Flores	Paraguay	52.8	
1	4	Fernando Castro	Portugal	50.5	Q
2	4	Joel Rocha	Brazil	50.7	Q
3	4	Gonzalo González	Mexico	50.8	
1	5	Germán Guenard	Puerto Rico	47.9	Q
2	5	Virgilio González	Spain	48.9	Q
3	5	Emilio Romero	Venezuela	48.9	q
4	5	Rafael Arcos	Ecuador	50.6	
5	5	Francisco Paganessi	Argentina	51.0	

Semifinals – 12 October

Rank	Heat	Name	Nationality	Time	Notes
1	1	Germán Guenard	Puerto Rico	47.7	Q
2	1	Anubes da Silva	Brazil	48.6	Q
3	1	Hortensio Fucil	Venezuela	48.7	Q
4	1	Julio León	Chile	48.8	
5	1	José Luis Martínez	Spain	50.5	
6	1	Fernando Castro	Portugal	52.5	
1	2	José Luis Villalongo	Puerto Rico	48.7	Q
2	2	Humberto Brown	Panama	48.9	Q
3	2	René Ahumada	Mexico	48.9	Q
4	2	Emilio Romero	Venezuela	49.8	
5	2	Virgilio González	Spain	50.1	
6	2	Joel Rocha	Brazil	50.6	

Final – 13 October

Rank	Name	Nationality	Time	Notes
1st place, gold medalist(s)	Humberto Brown	Panama	47.4	
2nd place, silver medalist(s)	Germán Guenard	Puerto Rico	47.9	
3rd place, bronze medalist(s)	Anubes da Silva	Brazil	48.5	
4	Hortensio Fucil	Venezuela	48.7	
5	René Ahumada	Mexico	48.8	
6	José Luis Villalongo	Puerto Rico	49.5	

=== 800 metres ===
Heats – 14 October

Rank	Heat	Name	Nationality	Time	Notes
1	1	Víctor Lozano	Argentina	1:56.3	Q
2	1	Ramón Sandoval	Chile	1:56.3	Q
3	1	Rogêrio Gonçalves	Portugal	1:56.9	Q
4	1	Alfonso Tinoco	Mexico	1:57.0	q
5	1	Jacinto Frías	Uruguay	1:58.4	
6	1	Harvey Borrero	Colombia	1:59.0	
1	2	Julio Gómez	Spain	1:56.2	Q
2	2	José Regino Andino	Puerto Rico	1:56.7	Q
3	2	Paulo Araújo	Brazil	1:57.1	Q
4	2	Héctor Mariño	Mexico	1:57.9	
5	2	Cándido Duarte	Paraguay	2:00.3	
6	2	Guillermo Rocca	Venezuela	2:06.7	
1	3	Julio León	Chile	1:55.8	Q
2	3	Tomás Barris	Spain	1:56.6	Q
3	3	Evelio Planas	Cuba	1:57.0	Q
4	3	Orlando Arévalo	Uruguay	1:58.2	
5	3	Enrique Alfonso	Venezuela	1:59.4	
6	3	Francisco Paganessi	Argentina	2:01.2	

Final – 15 October

Rank	Name	Nationality	Time	Notes
1st place, gold medalist(s)	Ramón Sandoval	Chile	1:50.4	
2nd place, silver medalist(s)	Tomás Barris	Spain	1:51.0	
3rd place, bronze medalist(s)	Julio León	Chile	1:51.9	
4	Julio Gómez	Spain	1:53.3	
5	Paulo Araújo	Brazil	1:53.8	
6	Víctor Lozano	Argentina	1:55.0	
	Rogêrio Gonçalves	Portugal	NT	
	José Regino Andino	Puerto Rico	NT	
	Evelio Planas	Cuba	NT	
	Alfonso Tinoco	Mexico	NT	

=== 1500 metres ===
Heats – 11 October

Rank	Heat	Name	Nationality	Time	Notes
1	1	Tomás Barris	Spain	3:59.2	Q
2	1	Joaquim Ferreira	Portugal	3:59.5	Q
3	1	Ricardo Vidal	Chile	4:00.0	Q
4	1	Paulo Araújo	Brazil	4:00.8	Q
5	1	Alfonso Tinoco	Mexico	4:01.2	Q
6	1	Domingo Amaizón	Argentina	4:01.5	
7	1	Jacinto Frías	Uruguay	NT	
8	1	Carlos Mujica	Venezuela	NT	
1	2	Julio Gómez	Spain	3:57.7	Q
2	2	Ramón Sandoval	Chile	3:58.7	Q
3	2	Manuel de Oliveira	Portugal	3:59.0	Q
4	2	Sebastião Mendes	Brazil	4:01.1	Q
5	2	Gilberto Miori	Argentina	4:05.5	Q
6	2	Harvey Borrero	Colombia	4:05.6	
7	1	Orlando Arévalo	Uruguay	NT	
8	1	Enrique Alfonso	Venezuela	NT	
9	1	Cándido Duarte	Paraguay	NT	

Final – 12 October

Rank	Name	Nationality	Time	Notes
1st place, gold medalist(s)	Ramón Sandoval	Chile	3:52.4	
2nd place, silver medalist(s)	Tomás Barris	Spain	3:52.8	
3rd place, bronze medalist(s)	Julio Gómez	Spain	3:56.0	
4	Sebastião Mendes	Brazil	3:58.0	
5	Manuel de Oliveira	Portugal	3:58.2	
6	Ricardo Vidal	Chile	3:58.6	
	Joaquim Ferreira	Portugal	NT	
	Paulo Araújo	Brazil	NT	
	Alfonso Tinoco	Mexico	NT	
	Gilberto Miori	Argentina	NT	

=== 5000 metres ===
14 October

Rank	Name	Nationality	Time	Notes
1st place, gold medalist(s)	Osvaldo Suárez	Argentina	14:29.0	
2nd place, silver medalist(s)	José Molins	Spain	14:33.6	
3rd place, bronze medalist(s)	Manuel de Oliveira	Portugal	14:56.4	
4	Joaquim Santos	Portugal	15:01.8	
5	Ricardo Vidal	Chile	15:05.6	
6	Eligio Galicia	Mexico	15:08.6	
	Carlos Mujica	Venezuela	NT	
	João dos Santos	Brazil	NT	
	Albertino Etchechurry	Uruguay	NT	
	Luis Campusano	Chile	NT	
	Florentino Oropeza	Venezuela	NT	
	Isidro Segura	Mexico	NT	
	Julio Cuadri	Uruguay	NT	
	Armando Pino	Argentina	NT	
	Fernando Aguilar	Spain	NT	
	Cándido Duarte	Paraguay	NT	
	Arlindo da Silva	Brazil	NT	

=== 10,000 metres ===
12 October

Rank	Name	Nationality	Time	Notes
1st place, gold medalist(s)	Osvaldo Suárez	Argentina	30:26.0	
2nd place, silver medalist(s)	José Molins	Spain	30:31.6	
3rd place, bronze medalist(s)	Carlos Pérez	Spain	31:02.4	
4	Álvaro Conde	Portugal	31:24.2	
5	Gumersindo Gómez	Argentina	31:35.6	
6	Luis Campusano	Chile	31:44.6	
	João dos Santos	Brazil	NT	
	Eligio Galicia	Mexico	NT	
	Julio Cuadri	Uruguay	NT	
	Luis García	Spain	NT	
	Florentino Oropeza	Venezuela	NT	
	Joaquim Santos	Portugal	NT	
	José Aceituno	Chile	NT	
	Isidro Segura	Mexico	NT	
	Arlindo da Silva	Brazil	NT	

=== Marathon ===
16 October

Rank	Name	Nationality	Time	Notes
1st place, gold medalist(s)	Osvaldo Suárez	Argentina	2:38:22.4	
2nd place, silver medalist(s)	Gumersindo Gómez	Argentina	2:38:33.0	
3rd place, bronze medalist(s)	Álvaro Conde	Portugal	2:43:19.6	
4	Dorival Lima	Brazil	2:47:30.6	
5	Juan Silva	Chile	2:52:26.0	
6	Margarito Peralta	Mexico	2:56:32.8	
7	José Jofré	Chile	2:57.56.0	
	Luis Molina	Peru	NT	
	Florencio Baches	Guatemala	NT	
	Juan Maidana	Uruguay	NT	
	Miguel Navarro	Spain	NT	

=== 110 metres hurdles ===
Heats – 12 October

Rank	Heat	Name	Nationality	Time	Notes
1	1	Carlos Mossa	Brazil	15.1	Q
2	1	Guillermo Zapata	Colombia	15.8	Q
3	1	Ariel Standen	Chile	16.0	Q
4	1	Luis Salazar	Ecuador	16.2	Q
	1	Luis Huarcaya	Peru	DQ	
1	2	Lázaro Betancourt	Cuba	14.7	Q
2	2	Emilio Campra	Spain	15.0	Q
3	2	José Telles da Conceição	Brazil	15.0	Q
4	2	Cumura Imboá	Portugal	15.2	Q
5	2	John Muñoz	Venezuela	15.3	
6	2	Carlos Cozzi	Argentina	15.4	
	2	José Cavero	Peru	DQ	
1	3	Teófilo Davis Bell	Venezuela	15.5	Q
2	3	Juan Carlos Dyrzka	Argentina	15.6	Q
3	3	Gabriel Roldán	Mexico	15.9	Q
4	3	Teófilo Colón	Puerto Rico	15.9	Q
5	3	Héctor Henríquez	Chile	16.0	
	3	Jaime Estévez	Ecuador	DQ	

Semifinals – 12 October

Rank	Heat	Name	Nationality	Time	Notes
1	1	Lázaro Betancourt	Cuba	14.4	Q
2	1	José Telles da Conceição	Brazil	14.6	Q
3	1	Teófilo Davis Bell	Venezuela	14.6	Q
4	1	Cumura Imboá	Portugal	15.1	
5	1	Gabriel Roldán	Mexico	15.8	
5	1	Luis Salazar	Ecuador	15.9	
1	2	Carlos Mossa	Brazil	14.9	Q
2	2	Emilio Campra	Spain	15.1	Q
3	2	Juan Carlos Dyrzka	Argentina	15.5	Q
4	2	Teófilo Colón	Puerto Rico	15.5	
5	2	Guillermo Zapata	Colombia	15.8	
6	2	Ariel Standen	Chile	16.2	

Final – 13 October

Rank	Lane	Name	Nationality	Time	Notes
1st place, gold medalist(s)	5	Lázaro Betancourt	Cuba	14.3	
2nd place, silver medalist(s)	2	José Telles da Conceição	Brazil	14.3	
3rd place, bronze medalist(s)	4	Carlos Mossa	Brazil	14.4	
4	6	Emilio Campra	Spain	14.8	
5	7	Juan Carlos Dyrzka	Argentina	15.2	
6	3	Teófilo Davis Bell	Venezuela	15.5	

=== 400 metres hurdles ===
Heats – 14 October

Rank	Heat	Name	Nationality	Time	Notes
1	1	Juan Carlos Dyrzka	Argentina	52.2	Q
2	1	Francisco Sainz	Spain	54.7	Q
3	1	Juan Montes	Puerto Rico	55.7	
4	1	Mario Gastelú	Peru	56.2	
5	1	Cumura Imboá	Portugal	56.8	
	1	Gabriel Roldán	Mexico	DQ	
1	2	Anubes da Silva	Brazil	54.4	Q
2	2	José Cavero	Peru	54.8	Q
3	2	Isidro Ibarrondo	Argentina	55.0	
4	2	Jaime Lamarca	Chile	58.3	
	2	Tito Bracho	Venezuela	DQ	
1	3	Ovidio de Jesús	Puerto Rico	54.9	Q
2	3	Ulisses dos Santos	Brazil	55.0	Q
3	3	Arístides Pineda	Venezuela	56.9	

Final – 15 October

Rank	Lane	Name	Nationality	Time	Notes
1st place, gold medalist(s)	5	Juan Carlos Dyrzka	Argentina	52.8	
2nd place, silver medalist(s)	2	Anubes da Silva	Brazil	53.0	
3rd place, bronze medalist(s)	6	Ovidio de Jesús	Puerto Rico	53.7	
4	1	Ulisses dos Santos	Brazil	53.7	
5	3	José Cavero	Peru	54.9	
6	4	Francisco Sainz	Spain	55.1	

=== 3000 metres steeplechase ===
16 October

Rank	Name	Nationality	Time	Notes
1st place, gold medalist(s)	Sebastião Mendes	Brazil	9:01.8	
2nd place, silver medalist(s)	Manuel Alonso	Spain	9:04.8	
3rd place, bronze medalist(s)	José Jesús Fernández	Spain	9:07.4	
4	Francisco Allen	Chile	9:08.4	NR
5	Santiago Novas	Chile	9:14.2	
6	Joaquim Ferreira	Portugal	9:20.4	
	Gilberto Miori	Argentina	NT	
	Alfonso Tinoco	Mexico	NT	
	Carlos Mujica	Venezuela	NT	
	Albertino Etchechury	Uruguay	NT	
	Domingo Amaizón	Argentina	NT	
	José Purmo	Brazil	NT	
	Eligio Galicia	Mexico	NT	
	Feliciano Marques	Portugal	NT	

=== 4 × 100 metres relay ===
Heats – 14 October

Rank	Heat	Nation	Competitors	Time	Notes
1	1	Brazil	Affonso da Silva, João Pires Sobrinho, Joe Satow, José Telles da Conceição	41.4	Q
2	1	Spain	José Luis González, Roca, Melanio Asensio, José Luis Albarrán	42.1	Q
3	1	Chile	Juan Enrique Byers, Juan Mouat, Eduardo Krumm, Alberto Keitel	42.4	Q
4	1	Puerto Rico	Rubén Díaz, Rumildo (?) Cruz, Manuel Rivera, José Luis Villalongo	42.6	
5	1	Ecuador	Jaime Estévez, Guillermo Martínez, José Ribadeneira, Luis Salazar	44.1	
1	2	Venezuela	Lloyd Murad, Rafael Romero, Emilio Romero, Horacio Esteves	40.9	Q
2	2	Panama	Humberto Brown, Luis Carter, Sydney Dobbs, Percival Jespech	42.1	Q
3	2	Argentina	Guillermo Bahler, Gerardo Bönnhoff, Vicente Giorgio, Luis Vienna	43.9	Q

Final – 15 October

Rank	Nation	Competitors	Time	Notes
1st place, gold medalist(s)	Venezuela	Lloyd Murad, Rafael Romero, Emilio Romero, Horacio Esteves	40.3	
2nd place, silver medalist(s)	Brazil	Affonso da Silva, João Pires Sobrinho, Joe Satow, José Telles da Conceição	40.6	
3rd place, bronze medalist(s)	Panama	Humberto Brown, Luis Carter, Sydney Dobbs, Percival Jespech	41.3	
4	Chile	Juan Enrique Byers, Juan Mouat, Eduardo Krumm, Alberto Keitel	41.6	
5	Argentina	Guillermo Bahler, Gerardo Bönnhoff, Vicente Giorgio, Luis Vienna	42.3	
6	Spain	José Luis González, Roca, Melanio Asensio, José Luis Albarrán	42.4	

=== 4 × 400 metres relay ===
Heats – 16 October

Rank	Heat	Nation	Competitors	Time	Notes
1	1	Puerto Rico	Juan Montes, José Luis Villalongo, Ovidio de Jesús, Germán Guenard	3:15.9	Q
2	1	Spain	Virgilio González, Jesús Rancaño, José Luis Martínez, Amigo	3:18.6	Q
3	1	Chile	Otto Biehl, Ramón Sandoval, José Gallegos, Julio León	3:19.7	Q
4	1	Peru	Eulogio Gómez, José Cavero, Mario Gastelú, Luis Huarcaya	3:20.6	
5	1	Mexico	Gonzalo González, René Ahumada, Alfonso Tinoco, Fajer	3:21.6	
1	2	Brazil	Joel Rocha, Anubes da Silva, Paulo de Oliveira, Ulisses dos Santos	3:18.4	Q
2	2	Portugal	Fernando Castro, Valentim Baptista, Rogêrio Gonçalves, Cumura Imboá	3:18.8	Q
3	2	Argentina	Gerardo Bönnhoff, Víctor Lozano, Francisco Paganessi, Juan Carlos Dyrzka	3:19.1	Q
4	2	Venezuela	Leslie Mentor, Hortensio Fucil, Emilio Romero, Lloyd Murad	3:20.9	

Final – 16 October

Rank	Nation	Competitors	Time	Notes
1st place, gold medalist(s)	Puerto Rico	Juan Montes, José Luis Villalongo, Ovidio de Jesús, Germán Guenard	3:12.8	
2nd place, silver medalist(s)	Brazil	Joel Rocha, Anubes da Silva, Paulo de Oliveira, Ulisses dos Santos	3:15.2	
3rd place, bronze medalist(s)	Spain	Virgilio González, Jesús Rancaño, José Luis Martínez, Amigo	3:15.6	
4	Chile	Otto Biehl, Ramón Sandoval, José Gallegos, Julio León	3:18.4	
5	Argentina	Gerardo Bönnhoff, Víctor Lozano, Francisco Paganessi, Juan Carlos Dyrzka	3:18.5	
6	Portugal	Cumura Imboá, Rogêrio Gonçalves, Fernando Castro, Valentim Baptista	3:20.7	

=== High jump ===
Qualification – 12 October

Rank	Name	Nationality	Result	Notes
1	Eugenio Velasco	Chile	1.85	q
1	Alfredo Lopes	Brazil	1.85	q
1	Eleuterio Fassi	Argentina	1.85	q
1	Teodoro Palacios	Guatemala	1.85	q
1	Víctor Carmona	Puerto Rico	1.85	q
1	Paulo de Oliveira	Brazil	1.85	q
1	Horacio Martínez	Argentina	1.85	q
1	José Miguel López	Spain	1.85	q
9	Ricardo Pérez	Cuba	1.80	q
9	Carlos Vásquez	Puerto Rico	1.80	q
11	Roberto Abugattás	Peru	1.80	
11	Antonio Acosta	Uruguay	1.80	
11	Sergio Montes	Chile	1.80	
14	Gilberto Sirit	Venezuela	1.75	
14	Roberto Procel	Mexico	1.75	
14	Ricardo Bustamante	Spain	1.75	

Final – 12 October

Rank	Name	Nationality	1.80	1.85	1.90	1.95	2.00	Result	Notes
1st place, gold medalist(s)	Teodoro Palacios	Guatemala	o	o	xxo	xxo	xxx	1.95	
2nd place, silver medalist(s)	Eugenio Velasco	Chile	–	o	o	xxx		1.90	
2nd place, silver medalist(s)	Eleuterio Fassi	Argentina	–	o	o	xxx		1.90	
4	José Miguel López	Spain	o	o	o	xxx		1.90	
5	Alfredo Lopes	Brazil	o	o	xxx			1.85	
5	Víctor Carmona	Puerto Rico	o	o	xxx			1.85	
5	Horacio Martínez	Argentina	o	o	xxx			1.85	
8	Paulo de Oliveira	Brazil	o	xo	xxx			1.85	
9	Carlos Vásquez	Puerto Rico	xxo	o	xxx			1.85	
9	Ricardo Pérez	Cuba	o	xxx				1.80	

=== Pole vault ===
15 October

Rank	Name	Nationality	3.60	3.70	3.80	3.90	4.00	4.10	4.15	4.20	4.25	4.30	4.35	Result	Notes
1st place, gold medalist(s)	Rolando Cruz	Puerto Rico	–	–	–	–	o	o	o	o	o	o	xx	4.30	
2nd place, silver medalist(s)	Fernando Adarraga	Spain	–	–	o	–	o	o	xxo	xo				4.20	
3rd place, bronze medalist(s)	Luis Meza	Chile	–	xo	o	xxo	o	o	xo					4.15	AR
4	Felipe Rodríguez	Spain	–	–	o	o	o							4.00	
5	Tomotsu Nishida	Brazil	–	o	o	o	o							4.00	
6	Cristián Raab	Chile	o	o	o	o	o							4.00	
7	Manuel dos Santos	Portugal	o	o	o									3.80	
8	Ayrton Turini	Brazil	o	xo	o									3.80	
9	Miguel Rivera	Puerto Rico	–	o	xxo									3.80	
10	Brígido Iriarte	Venezuela	o	o										3.70	

=== Long jump ===
Qualification – 13 October

Rank	Name	Nationality	Result	Notes
1	Adhemar da Silva	Brazil	7.05	q
2	Roberto Procel	Mexico	7.01	q
3	Pedro de Almeida	Portugal	7.00	q
4	Carlos Tornquist	Chile	6.97	q
5	Víctor Hernández	Cuba	6.96	q
6	Tito Bracho	Venezuela	6.92	q
7	Alfonso Mauleón	Spain	6.90	q
8	José Telles da Conceição	Brazil	6.88	q
9	Glydden Feliciano	Puerto Rico	6.78	q
10	Manuel Claudio	Portugal	6.78	q
11	Carlos Vera	Chile	6.71	
12	Jorge Castillo	Argentina	6.55	
13	Asnoldo Devonish	Venezuela	6.54	
14	Rigoberto Portillo	Paraguay	6.12	
15	Guillermo Vallania	Argentina	6.06	
16	Julio Aliaga	?	6.04	

Final – 13 October

Rank	Name	Nationality	#1	#2	#3	#4	#5	#6	Result	Notes
1st place, gold medalist(s)	Pedro de Almeida	Portugal	x	7.32	x	6.80	x	x	7.32	
2nd place, silver medalist(s)	Roberto Procel	Mexico	7.02	6.80	x	7.01	7.16	7.12	7.16	
3rd place, bronze medalist(s)	Adhemar da Silva	Brazil	7.07	6.86	x	6.86	6.76	7.04	7.07	
4	Tito Bracho	Venezuela	x	7.07	7.03	x	6.59	6.92	7.07	
5	Alfonso Mauleón	Spain	7.06	6.74	6.71	6.78	6.70	6.90	7.06	
6	Carlos Tornquist	Chile	7.03	x	6.78	x	6.93	6.87	7.03	
7	Manuel Claudio	Portugal	6.95	6.99	6.87				6.99	
8	José Telles da Conceição	Brazil	x	x	6.97				6.97	
9	Víctor Hernández	Cuba	6.91	6.68	6.78				6.91	
10	Glydden Feliciano	Puerto Rico	6.63	6.61	x				6.63	

=== Triple jump ===
Qualification – 16 October

Rank	Name	Nationality	Result	Notes
1	Adhemar da Silva	Brazil	14.76	q
2	Jorge Castillo	Argentina	14.70	q
3	Rumildo Cruz	Puerto Rico	14.69	q
4	Víctor Hernández	Cuba	14.55	q
5	Ramón López	Cuba	14.44	q
6	Pedro Camacho	Puerto Rico	14.40	q
7	Asnoldo Devonish	Venezuela	14.17	q
8	Luis Huarcaya	Peru	14.16	q
9	Ariel Standen	Chile	14.15	q
10	Silvio Moreira	Brazil	14.13	q
11	Carlos Vera	Chile	?	
13	Ricardo Bustamante	Spain	13.64	
14	John Muñoz	Venezuela	13.56	
15	Alfonso Mauleón	Spain	13.46	
16	Isidro Ibarrondo	Argentina	12.84	

Final – 16 October

Rank	Name	Nationality	#1	#2	#3	#4	#5	#6	Result	Notes
1st place, gold medalist(s)	Adhemar da Silva	Brazil	15.62	15.77	15.83	x	x	x	15.83	
2nd place, silver medalist(s)	Ramón López	Cuba	14.48	14.82	15.06	14.78	x	14.66	15.06	
3rd place, bronze medalist(s)	Jorge Castillo	Argentina	14.86	15.00	x	x	x	x	15.00	
4	Rumildo Cruz	Puerto Rico	14.73	14.98	x	14.19	14.79	x	14.98	
5	Ariel Standen	Chile	14.87	14.92	14.47	x	14.24	14.32	14.92	PB
6	Luis Huarcaya	Peru	14.85	14.44	x				14.85	
7	Carlos Vera	Chile	14.63	14.83	14.67				14.83	
8	Pedro Camacho	Puerto Rico	x	14.63	14.32				14.63	
9	Víctor Hernández	Cuba	14.32	x	14.25				14.32	
10	Silvio Moreira	Brazil	14.18	14.13					14.18	
	Asnoldo Devonish	Venezuela	x						NM	

=== Shot put ===
Qualification – 13 October

Rank	Name	Nationality	Result	Notes
1	Enrique Helf	Argentina	15.81	q
2	Luis Di Cursi	Argentina	15.71	q
3	José Galvão	Portugal	14.52	q
4	Leonardo Kittsteiner	Chile	14.26	q
4	Alcides Dambrós	Brazil	14.26	q
6	Alfonso Vidal-Quadras	Spain	14.02	q
7	Ramón Rosario	Puerto Rico	13.98	q
8	Héctor Thomas	Venezuela	13.72	q
9	Luis Bustamante	Chile	13.76	q
10	Arnoldo Pallarés	Cuba	13.63	q
11	Alfonso de Andrés	Spain	13.41	
12	Omar Tugue	Brazil	13.39	
13	Dagoberto González	Colombia	12.99	
14	Ceferino Andara	Venezuela	12.35	

Final – 13 October

Rank	Name	Nationality	#1	#2	#3	#4	#5	#6	Result	Notes
1st place, gold medalist(s)	Enrique Helf	Argentina	16.09	15.77	x	x	x	15.21	16.09	
2nd place, silver medalist(s)	Luis Di Cursi	Argentina	15.34	15.07	15.46	14.93	14.96	15.88	15.88	
3rd place, bronze medalist(s)	Alfonso Vidal-Quadras	Spain	14.48	14.44	14.72	14.12	14.35	14.24	14.72	
4	Alcides Dambrós	Brazil	14.06	14.69	x	14.38	x	x	14.69	
5	Leonardo Kittsteiner	Chile	14.46	x	14.22	x	x	13.97	14.46	
6	José Galvão	Portugal	14.09	x	14.04	14.14	x	x	14.14	
7	Héctor Thomas	Venezuela	13.47	13.99	x				13.99	
8	Luis Bustamante	Chile	13.73	13.85	12.87				13.85	
9	Arnoldo Pallarés	Cuba	13.26	11.95	13.75				13.75	
10	Ramón Rosario	Puerto Rico	x	13.62	13.48				13.48	

=== Discus throw ===
Qualification – 14 October

Rank	Name	Nationality	Result	Notes
1	Günther Kruse	Argentina	46.69	q
2	Dieter Gevert	Chile	46.22	q
3	Hernán Haddad	Chile	46.13	q
4	Miguel de la Quadra-Salcedo	Spain	45.12	q
5	Héctor Menacho	Peru	44.61	q
6	Dagoberto González	Colombia	44.54	q
7	Enrique Helf	Argentina	44.39	q
8	Manuel Goulão	Portugal	43.73	q
9	João Afonso	Portugal	43.57	q
10	José Culleré	Spain	42.73	q
11	Héctor Thomas	Venezuela	42.00	
12	Alcides Dambrós	Brazil	41.44	
13	Roberto Chapchap	Brazil	40.84	
14	Rodolfo Sedas	Mexico	40.38	
15	Ceferino Andara	Venezuela	39.16	
16	Ramón Rosario	Puerto Rico	36.79	

Final – 14 October

Rank	Name	Nationality	#1	#2	#3	#4	#5	#6	Result	Notes
1st place, gold medalist(s)	Günther Kruse	Argentina	46.36	48.56	46.46	44.88	46.71	x	48.56	
2nd place, silver medalist(s)	Dieter Gevert	Chile	43.55	46.54	47.98	47.84	45.63	45.79	47.98	
3rd place, bronze medalist(s)	Hernán Haddad	Chile	47.19	44.42	47.13	47.50	x	47.88	47.88	
4	Miguel de la Quadra-Salcedo	Spain	47.21	x	x	x	x	x	47.21	
5	João Afonso	Portugal	x	45.34	x	41.70	42.52	45.45	45.45	
6	Enrique Helf	Argentina	43.50	44.62	x	43.78	x	44.18	44.62	
7	Héctor Menacho	Peru	42.48	42.88	44.46				44.46	
8	Dagoberto González	Colombia	25.00	x	42.91				42.91	
9	José Culleré	Spain	41.62	42.20	41.06				42.20	
10	Manuel Goulão	Portugal	42.05	38.03	41.34				42.05	

=== Hammer throw ===
15 October

Rank	Name	Nationality	#1	#2	#3	#4	#5	#6	Result	Notes
1st place, gold medalist(s)	José Máría Elorriaga	Spain	x	52.69	48.80	52.99	x	52.60	52.99	
2nd place, silver medalist(s)	Alejandro Díaz	Chile	x	51.19	52.16	52.15	50.85	48.34	52.16	
3rd place, bronze medalist(s)	Roberto Chapchap	Brazil	50.48	50.39	52.16	51.83	50.52	50.14	52.16	
4	José Luis Falcón	Spain	x	49.86	x	x	48.85	x	49.86	
5	Lido Crispieri	Chile	43.55	48.35	47.55	46.01	46.57	x	48.35	
6	Jorge Lucero	Argentina	x	44.23	x	x	48.25	x	48.25	
7	Bruno Strohmeier	Brazil							47.66	
8	Luis Vélez	Puerto Rico							47.34	
9	Ceferino Andara	Venezuela							45.20	
	Rubén Dávila	Puerto Rico							NM	
	Daniel Cereali	Venezuela							NM	

=== Javelin throw ===
Qualification – 12 October

Rank	Name	Nationality	Result	Notes
1	Arnoldo Pallarés	Cuba	66.92	q
2	Antonio Costa	Uruguay	62.88	q
3	Juris Laipenieks	Chile	62.19	q
4	Alfonso de Andrés	Spain	61.24	q
5	Luis Zárate	Peru	60.71	q
6	Manuel Mendes	Portugal	60.64	q
7	Jesús Rodríguez	Venezuela	60.48	q
8	Ayrton Turini	Brazil	59.02	q
9	Aníbal Arroyo	Venezuela	58.80	q
9	Benigno Santiago	Puerto Rico	58.80	q
11	Emilio Navarro	Puerto Rico	58.09	q
12	Ricardo Héber	Argentina	57.54	q
13	José Culleré	Spain	57.53	q
14	Omar Tugue	Brazil	57.50	q
15	Francisco Domingues	Portugal	55.33	
16	Janis Stendzenieks	Chile	53.12	

Final – 12 October

Rank	Name	Nationality	#1	#2	#3	#4	#5	#6	Result	Notes
1st place, gold medalist(s)	Emilio Navarro	Puerto Rico	58.78	60.58	67.38	61.37	62.90	x	67.38	
2nd place, silver medalist(s)	José Culleré	Spain	66.78	59.81	67.23	60.99	65.49	66.49	67.23	
3rd place, bronze medalist(s)	Alfonso de Andrés	Spain	62.64	61.15	x	64.42	59.63	62.89	64.42	
4	Arnoldo Pallarés	Cuba	62.89	x	x	61.51	55.81	56.14	62.89	
5	Jesús Rodríguez	Venezuela	61.70	58.12	58.05	55.95	61.96	61.05	61.96	
6	Manuel Mendes	Portugal	60.95	x	59.91	61.53	54.98	57.39	61.53	
7	Benigno Santiago	Puerto Rico	58.54	59.67	59.92				59.92	
8	Ricardo Héber	Argentina	58.39	56.66	59.35				59.35	
9	Ayrton Turini	Brazil	59.01	x	x				59.01	
10	Juris Laipenieks	Chile	55.54	57.92	58.53				58.53	
11	Aníbal Arroyo	Venezuela	58.43	58.35	55.96				58.43	
12	Antonio Costa	Uruguay	58.09	58.12	x				58.12	
13	Luis Zárate	Peru	56.97	57.73	x				57.73	
14	Omar Tugue	Brazil	56.64	x	x				56.64	

=== Decathlon ===
15–16 October – 1952 tables (1985 conversions given with *)

The highest mark recorded in each event is highlighted in yellow

Rank	Athlete	Nationality	100m	LJ	SP	HJ	400m	110m H	DT	PV	JT	1500m	Points	Conv.	Notes
1st place, gold medalist(s)	Héctor Thomas	Venezuela	10.8	6.96	14.61	1.79	54.1	16.0	41.63	3.50	53.64	5:16.8	6476	6667*	
2nd place, silver medalist(s)	Emir Martínez	Argentina	11.6	6.56	13.47	1.76	52.2	15.7	39.01	3.20	46.81	4:32.9	6091	6451*	
3rd place, bronze medalist(s)	Juris Laipenieks	Chile	11.2	6.97	12.72	1.65	53.0	16.5	39.17	3.30	57.60	4:47.6	6081	6468*	
4	Cleomenes da Cunha	Brazil	11.4	6.25	11.61	1.76	53.2	15.5	37.54	3.50	53.93	4:47.9	5967	6344*	
5	Tito Bracho	Venezuela	11.1	6.99	11.15	1.76	51.3	15.9	29.50	3.40	47.60	5:05.5	5800	6204*	
6	Bernabé Souza	Brazil	11.2	6.55	11.39	1.70	51.2	15.6	26.01	3.60	40.15	4:37.8	5709	6126*	
7	Héctor González	Argentina	11.2	6.30	10.91	1.65	51.2	16.3	31.78	3.00	41.61	4:46.0	5306	5853*	
8	Gabriel Roldán	Mexico	11.6	6.39	10.19	1.65	51.5	15.8	35.03	2.80	39.12	4:42.9	5209	5790*	
9	Víctor Carmona	Puerto Rico	12.2	5.91	10.76	1.95	59.9	20.8	26.06	3.10	53.65	5:09.8	4271	5024*	
10	Werner Wicha	Chile	11.9	6.15	9.06	1.65	55.8	18.7	23.85	3.40	51.25	5:31.6	4162	4976*	
11	Emilio Navarro	Puerto Rico	12.0	6.37	10.61	1.65	57.8	20.9	30.43	2.70	63.31	6:00.4	4126	4859*	
	Rodolfo Mijares	Mexico	10.9	6.65	11.20	1.60	50.8	16.3	36.06	NM	–	–	DNF	DNF	

== Women's results ==
=== 100 metres ===
Heats – 12 October

Rank	Heat	Name	Nationality	Time	Notes
1	1	Jean Holmes	Panama	12.2	Q
2	1	Nancy Correa	Chile	12.4	Q
3	1	Marta Boungiorno	Argentina	12.6	Q
4	1	Eliette Zenardo	Brazil	12.7	
5	1	Sonia Caire	Mexico	12.8	
6	1	Benilde Ascanio	Venezuela	13.1	
1	2	Carlota Gooden	Panama	12.1	Q
2	2	Marisol Massot	Chile	12.4	Q
3	2	Edith Berg	Argentina	12.7	Q
4	2	Érica da Silva	Brazil	12.9	
5	2	Yolanda Vincourt	Mexico	13.1	
6	2	Inés Gamba	Uruguay	13.5	
7	2	Peggy Linch	Guatemala	13.8	

Final – 13 October

Rank	Name	Nationality	Time	Notes
1st place, gold medalist(s)	Carlota Gooden	Panama	11.9	
2nd place, silver medalist(s)	Edith Berg	Argentina	12.3	
3rd place, bronze medalist(s)	Marisol Massot	Chile	12.4	
4	Nancy Correa	Chile	12.4	
5	Marta Boungiorno	Argentina	12.5	
	Jean Holmes	Panama	DQ	

=== 200 metres ===
Heats – 15 October

Rank	Heat	Name	Nationality	Time	Notes
1	1	Lorraine Dunn	Panama	25.5	Q
2	1	Érica da Silva	Brazil	25.7	Q
3	1	Marta Buongiorno	Argentina	25.8	Q
4	1	Benilde Ascanio	Venezuela	27.0	
5	1	Aurora Bianchi	Chile	27.3	
1	2	Jean Holmes	Panama	24.7	Q
2	2	Ada Brener	Argentina	26.0	Q
3	2	Nancy Correa	Chile	26.4	Q
4	2	Sonia Caire	Mexico	26.7	
5	2	Laura das Chagas	Brazil	27.1	
6	2	Inés Gamba	Uruguay	28.8	

Final – 16 October

Rank	Name	Nationality	Time	Notes
1st place, gold medalist(s)	Jean Holmes	Panama	24.8	
2nd place, silver medalist(s)	Lorraine Dunn	Panama	25.7	
3rd place, bronze medalist(s)	Marta Buongiorno	Argentina	26.0	
4	Ada Brener	Argentina	26.2	
5	Érica da Silva	Brazil	26.3	
6	Nancy Correa	Chile	26.4	

=== 80 metres hurdles ===
Heats – 11 October

Rank	Heat	Name	Nationality	Time	Notes
1	1	Wanda dos Santos	Brazil	12.0	Q
2	1	Julia Padrón	Cuba	12.4	Q
3	1	Gladys Azcuaga	Mexico	13.0	Q
	1	Ada Brener	Argentina	DQ	
1	2	Eliana Gaete	Chile	11.8	Q
2	2	Maria José de Lima	Brazil	11.9	Q
3	2	Benilde Ascanio	Venezuela	12.1	Q
4	2	Graciela Paviotti	Argentina	12.4	
5	2	Sonia Caire	Mexico	13.6	

Final – 14 October

Rank	Lane	Name	Nationality	Time	Notes
1st place, gold medalist(s)	3	Wanda dos Santos	Brazil	11.5	
2nd place, silver medalist(s)	6	Maria José de Lima	Brazil	11.9	
3rd place, bronze medalist(s)	5	Eliana Gaete	Chile	12.0	
4	4	Benilde Ascanio	Venezuela	12.1	
5	2	Julia Padrón	Cuba	12.2	
6	7	Gladys Azcuaga	Mexico	13.2	

=== 4 × 100 metres relay ===
16 October

Rank	Nation	Competitors	Time	Notes
1st place, gold medalist(s)	Panama	Silvia Hunte, Carlota Gooden, Lorraine Dunn, Jean Holmes	47.2	
2nd place, silver medalist(s)	Argentina	Margarita Formeiro, Marta Buongiorno, Ada Brener, Edith Berg	48.9	
3rd place, bronze medalist(s)	Chile	Eliana Gaete, Aurora Bianchi, Marisol Massot, Nancy Correa	49.2	
4	Brazil	Eliete Zenardo, Maria José de Lima, Érica da Silva, Wanda dos Santos	49.6	
5	Mexico	Gladys Azcuaga, Lili Schluter, Yolanda Vincourt, Sonia Caire	51.4	

=== High jump ===
13 October

Rank	Name	Nationality	1.35	1.40	1.45	1.50	1.55	Result	Notes
1st place, gold medalist(s)	Nelly Gómez	Chile	–	–	o	o	xxx	1.50	
2nd place, silver medalist(s)	Maria José de Lima	Brazil	–	o	xo	o	xxx	1.50	
3rd place, bronze medalist(s)	Deonildes Martins	Uruguay	–	o	o	xxx		1.45	
4	Wanda dos Santos	Brazil	o	o	xxo	xxx		1.45	
5	Benilde Ascanio	Venezuela	o	xo	xxx			1.40	
6	Smiliana Dezulovic	Chile	o	xxo	xxx			1.40	
7	Peggy Lynch	Guatemala	xxo	xxo	xxx			1.40	
8	Ada Brener	Argentina						1.40	
9	Graciela Paviotti	Argentina	o	xxx				1.35	
9	Reina Flores	Ecuador	o	xxx				1.35	
11	Mercedes Betancourt	Cuba	xo	xxx				1.35	
	Margarita Formeiro	Argentina	xxx					NM	
	Berta Chiú	Mexico	xxx					NM	
	Gladys Azcuaga	Mexico	xxx					NM	

=== Long jump ===
14 October

Rank	Name	Nationality	#1	#2	#3	#4	#5	#6	Result	Notes
1st place, gold medalist(s)	Ada Brener	Argentina	5.08	5.45	5.52	5.34	5.46	5.55	5.55	
2nd place, silver medalist(s)	Laura das Chagas	Brazil	5.43	x	5.36	5.03	5.30	5.04	5.43	
3rd place, bronze medalist(s)	Eliette Zenardo	Brazil	x	5.01	5.03	5.18	5.10	5.30	5.30	
4	Nancy Correa	Chile	x	4.91	5.19	4.92	5.13	x	5.19	
5	Benilde Ascanio	Venezuela	x	4.56	4.92	4.77	4.90	x	4.92	
6	Graciela Paviotti	Argentina	4.62	4.80	4.68	4.55	4.56	4.49	4.80	
7	Berta Chiú	Mexico	4.77	4.64	x				4.77	
8	María Inés Muñoz	Chile	x	4.76	4.51				4.76	
9	Inés Gamba	Uruguay	x	4.68	4.62				4.68	
10	Gladys Azcuaga	Mexico	x	4.27	3.81				4.27	

=== Shot put ===
14 October

Rank	Name	Nationality	#1	#2	#3	#4	#5	#6	Result	Notes
1st place, gold medalist(s)	Pradelia Delgado	Chile	11.46	11.58	11.04	10.76	12.17	11.66	12.17	
2nd place, silver medalist(s)	Ingeborg Pfüller	Argentina	x	11.52	x	x	x	x	11.52	
3rd place, bronze medalist(s)	Maria Caldeira	Brazil	10.60	11.03	11.03	10.44	9.82	10.09	11.03	
4	Smiliana Dezulovic	Chile	10.35	10.94	10.32	10.82	10.69	10.34	10.94	
5	Ingeborg Mello	Argentina	10.77	x	10.91	10.07	10.56	10.68	10.91	
6	María Barcelona	Uruguay	10.59	9.79	10.05	10.15	10.36	9.92	10.59	
7	Maria Ventura	Brazil	9.97	10.25	9.88				10.25	
8	Alejandrina Herrera	Cuba	8.99	10.17	10.20				10.20	

=== Discus throw ===
13 October

Rank	Name	Nationality	#1	#2	#3	#4	#5	#6	Result	Notes
1st place, gold medalist(s)	Ingeborg Mello	Argentina	37.32	37.51	37.03	37.03	31.71	39.34	39.34	
2nd place, silver medalist(s)	Pradelia Delgado	Chile	37.50	39.15	35.03	36.34	30.55	28.90	39.15	
3rd place, bronze medalist(s)	Ingeborg Pfüller	Argentina	x	x	38.34	38.61	37.07	x	38.61	
4	Suniko Yanakawa	Brazil	38.60	34.84	33.86	36.86	33.67	35.67	38.60	
5	Alejandrina Herrera	Cuba	38.54	37.60	33.70	24.04	36.68	38.01	38.54	
6	Teresa Gálvez	Chile	34.14	32.58	33.09	33.73	31.84	31.59	34.14	
7	María Barcelona	Uruguay	29.91	30.85	29.71				30.85	
	Maria Ventura	Brazil							NM	
	Lili Schluter	Mexico							NM	

=== Javelin throw ===
16 October – old model

Rank	Name	Nationality	#1	#2	#3	#4	#5	#6	Result	Notes
1st place, gold medalist(s)	Maria Ventura	Brazil	37.41	40.23	40.72	36.18	37.74	37.01	40.72	
2nd place, silver medalist(s)	Adriana Silva	Chile	37.00	39.25	40.22	39.02	38.46	37.72	40.22	
3rd place, bronze medalist(s)	Suniko Yanakawa	Brazil	x	24.59	27.93	24.17	25.74	29.22	29.22	
4	Lucía Zavala	Chile	26.45	27.83	x	x	x	22.91	27.83	
