= Benilde Ascanio =

Venezuelan athlete (1940-2020)

Personal information
- Born: July 29, 1940 (age 85) Caracas, Venezuela
- Died: March 27, 2020 (aged 79)

Sport
- Sport: Athletics
- Event(s): 100 metres, 200 metres, 80 metres hurdles, high jump, long jump

Benilde Ascanio (29 July 1940 – 27 March 2020) was a Venezuelan athlete who competed in sprinting, hurdling and jumping events. She won multiple medals at regional level. She was the first Venezuelan female to win a gold medal at the Central American and Caribbean Games.

== International competitions ==
Year	Competition	Venue	Position	Event	Notes
Representing Venezuela
1959	Central American and Caribbean Games	Caracas, Venezuela	2nd	80 m hurdles	12.92
1959	Central American and Caribbean Games	Caracas, Venezuela	3rd	4 × 100 m relay	53.26
1959	Central American and Caribbean Games	Caracas, Venezuela	1st	High jump	1.43 m
1959	Pan American Games	Chicago, United States	13th (sf)	100 m	NT
1959	Pan American Games	Chicago, United States	14th (h)	80 m hurdles	12.6
1959	Pan American Games	Chicago, United States	10th	High jump	1.40 m
1960	Ibero-American Games	Santiago, Chile	10th (h)	100 m	13.1 s
1960	Ibero-American Games	Santiago, Chile	8th (h)	200 m	27.0 s
1960	Ibero-American Games	Santiago, Chile	4th	80 m hurdles	12.1 s
1960	Ibero-American Games	Santiago, Chile	5th	High jump	1.40 m
1960	Ibero-American Games	Santiago, Chile	5th	Long jump	4.92 m
1961	Bolivarian Games	Barranquilla, Colombia	1st	80 m hurdles	12.6 s
1961	Bolivarian Games	Barranquilla, Colombia	3rd	4 × 100 m relay	52.3 s
1961	Bolivarian Games	Barranquilla, Colombia	2nd	High jump	1.40 m
1961	Bolivarian Games	Barranquilla, Colombia	1st	Long jump	4.91 m
1962	Central American and Caribbean Games	Kingston, Jamaica	6th	80 m hurdles	12.6 s
