= Dagoberto González =

Colombian athlete

Personal information
- Full name: Dagoberto González Pájaro
- Nationality: Cuban
- Born: 1932 Cartagena de Indias, Colombia
- Died: 30 May 2024 Orlando, Florida, United States

Sport
- Sport: Athletics
- Event: Discus throw

Dagoberto González Pájaro (1932 – 30 May 2024) was a Colombian athlete who specialised in the discus throw. He won multiple medals at regional level.

His personal best in the discus was 54.48 metres set in Panama City in 1970. At the time it was the South American record.

== International competitions ==
Year	Competition	Venue	Position	Event	Notes
Representing Colombia
1960	Ibero-American Games	Santiago, Chile	13th (q)	Shot put	12.99 m
1960	Ibero-American Games	Santiago, Chile	8th	Discus throw	42.91 m
1961	South American Championships	Lima, Peru	7th	Shot put	13.30 m
1961	South American Championships	Lima, Peru	6th	Discus throw	46.64 m
1961	Bolivarian Games	Barranquilla, Colombia	3rd	Shot put	13.79 m
1961	Bolivarian Games	Barranquilla, Colombia	1st	Discus throw	46.05 m
1961	Bolivarian Games	Barranquilla, Colombia	4th	Pentathlon	2540 pts
1962	Central American and Caribbean Games	Kingston, Jamaica	1st	Discus throw	48.66 m
1962	Ibero-American Games	Madrid, Spain	5th	Discus throw	46.31 m
1963	South American Championships	Cali, Colombia	3rd	Shot put	14.02 m
1963	South American Championships	Cali, Colombia	1st	Discus throw	48.84 m
1965	South American Championships	Rio de Janeiro, Brazil	3rd	Discus throw	48.04 m
1965	Bolivarian Games	Quito, Ecuador	1st	Shot put	14.75 m
1965	Bolivarian Games	Quito, Ecuador	1st	Discus throw	49.75 m
1965	Bolivarian Games	Quito, Ecuador	5th	Pentathlon	2937 pts
1966	Central American and Caribbean Games	San Juan, Puerto Rico	10th	Shot put	13.58 m
1966	Central American and Caribbean Games	San Juan, Puerto Rico	3rd	Discus throw	48.16 m
1966	Central American and Caribbean Games	San Juan, Puerto Rico	9th	Pentathlon	3122 pts
1967	Pan American Games	Winnipeg, Canada	7th	Discus throw	48.34 m
1967	South American Championships	Buenos Aires, Argentina	5th	Shot put	14.47 m
1967	South American Championships	Buenos Aires, Argentina	1st	Discus throw	54.00 m
1969	South American Championships	Quito, Ecuador	5th	Shot put	14.63 m
1969	South American Championships	Quito, Ecuador	1st	Discus throw	51.66 m
1970	Central American and Caribbean Games	Panama City, Panama	2nd	Discus throw	54.48 m
1970	Bolivarian Games	Maracaibo, Venezuela	1st	Discus throw	52.08 m
1971	Pan American Games	Cali, Colombia	6th	Discus throw	51.76 m
