= Pedro Camacho (athlete) =

Puerto Rican triple jumper

Pedro Camacho (Pedro Juan Camacho Cotto; born 26 November 1938 in Santurce, Puerto Rico) is a Puerto Rican former triple jumper who competed in the 1960 Summer Olympics.

== International competitions ==
Year	Competition	Venue	Position	Event	Notes
Representing Puerto Rico
1959	Central American and Caribbean Games	Caracas, Venezuela	1st	Triple jump	14.67 m
1959	Pan American Games	Chicago, United States	6th	Triple jump	14.66 m
1960	Olympic Games	Rome, Italy	37th (q)	Triple jump	14.21 m
1960	Ibero-American Games	Santiago, Chile	8th	Triple jump	14.63 m
1962	Central American and Caribbean Games	Kingston, Jamaica	?	Triple jump	?
