= Horacio Esteves =

Venezuelan sprinter (1941–1996)

Medal record

Athletics

Representing Venezuela

Central American and Caribbean Games
Gold medal – first place	1959 Caracas	4x100 m relay
Gold medal – first place	1962 Kingston	4x100 m relay

Bolivarian Games
Gold medal – first place	1961 Barranquilla	100 m
Silver medal – second place	1961 Barranquilla	200 m

Ibero-American Games
Gold medal – first place	1960 Santiago	4x100 m relay
Silver medal – second place	1960 Santiago	100 m

Horacio E. Esteves Orihuela Yaritagua, Yaracuy (6 July 1941 – 26 July 1996) was a Venezuelan sprinter who jointly held the 100 metres world record at 10.0s from 1964 to 1968. His record time was run on 15 August 1964 at the Estadio Nacional de "El Paraíso" in Caracas (now Brígido Iriarte Stadium), matching the time set by Armin Hary in 1960 and Harry Jerome in 1962. He was also a record holder in the 100-yard dash, at 9.2s.

He reached the semi-finals in the 100m at the 1960 Olympics, and the same year competed in the heats for Venezuela in the 4 X 100 m relay. A muscle strain prevented him from going to the 1964 Tokyo Olympics. He did not go beyond the heats in the 1968 Olympics 100m. Esteves competed in the 4×100 metres Relay at the 1963 Pan American Games winning a silver medal with Arquímedes Herrera, Héctor Thomas, and Rafael Romero. He finished fourth in the 100 meters at the 1963 Pan American Games.

He went to high school at the Aplicación Lyceum and Luis Espelozín schools. He received a degree in physical education from the Instituto Pedagógico de Caracas (now part of the Universidad Pedagógica Experimental Libertador. He did an MA in science, specializing in Planning and Nutrition, and then studied physiology of exercise at the Universidad de Los Andes and growth and development at the Universidad Simón Bolívar.

== International competitions ==
Year	Competition	Venue	Position	Event	Notes
Representing Venezuela
1959	Central American and Caribbean Games	Caracas, Venezuela	2nd	100 m	10.91
1959	Central American and Caribbean Games	Caracas, Venezuela	1st	4 × 100 m relay	42.14
1959	Pan American Games	Chicago, United States	7th (h)	100 m	NT
1960	Olympic Games	Rome, Italy	7th (sf)	100 m	11.1
1960	Olympic Games	Rome, Italy	8th (h)	4 × 100 m relay	41.11
1960	Ibero-American Games	Santiago, Chile	2nd	100 m	10.3
1960	Ibero-American Games	Santiago, Chile	1st	4 × 100 m relay	40.3
1961	South American Championships	Lima, Peru	2nd	100 m	10.6
1961	South American Championships	Lima, Peru	1st	200 m	21.3
1961	South American Championships	Lima, Peru	1st	4 x 100 m relay	41.0
1961	South American Championships	Lima, Peru	1st	4 x 400 m relay	3:16.0
1961	Bolivarian Games	Barranquilla, Colombia	1st	100 m	10.4
1961	Bolivarian Games	Barranquilla, Colombia	2nd	200 m	21.5
1961	Bolivarian Games	Barranquilla, Colombia	1st	4 x 100 m relay	42.0
1962	Central American and Caribbean Games	Kingston, Jamaica	6th	100 m	10.6
1962	Central American and Caribbean Games	Kingston, Jamaica	1st	4 × 100 m relay	40.0
1962	Ibero-American Games	Madrid, Spain	15th (h)	100 m	12.4
1963	Pan American Games	São Paulo, Brazil	4th	100 m	10.64
1963	Pan American Games	São Paulo, Brazil	2nd	4 × 100 m relay	40.71
1968	Olympic Games	Mexico City, Mexico	49 (h)	100 m	10.65
