= Teófilo Davis =

Venezuelan hurdler

Medal record

Athletics

Representing Venezuela

Bolivarian Games
Gold medal – first place	1951 Caracas	110 m hurdles
Gold medal – first place	1951 Caracas	High jump
Gold medal – first place	1961 Barranquilla	110 m hurdles

Teófilo Santiago Davis Bell (born 25 July 1929, date of death unknown) was a Venezuelan hurdler who competed in the 1952 Summer Olympics. Davis finished fifth in the 1955 Pan American Games 110 metres hurdles and seventh in the high jump.

== International competitions ==
Year	Competition	Venue	Position	Event	Notes
Representing Venezuela
1951	Pan American Games	Mexico City, Mexico	8th (h)	110 m hurdles	15.4
1951	Pan American Games	Mexico City, Mexico	9th	High jump	1.70 m
1951	Bolivarian Games	Caracas, Venezuela	1st	110 m hurdles	14.9
1951	Bolivarian Games	Caracas, Venezuela	1st	High jump	1.81 m
1952	Olympic Games	Helsinki, Finland	27th (h)	110 m hurdles	15.96
1952	Olympic Games	Helsinki, Finland	24th (q)	High jump	1.80 m
1954	Central American and Caribbean Games	Mexico City, Mexico	3rd	110 m hurdles	15.2
1954	South American Championships	São Paulo, Brazil	2nd	110 m hurdles	14.5 (w)
1954	South American Championships	São Paulo, Brazil	3rd	4 × 100 m relay	42.2
1955	Pan American Games	Mexico City, Mexico	5th	110 m hurdles	15.33
1955	Pan American Games	Mexico City, Mexico	7th	High jump	1.81 m
1959	Central American and Caribbean Games	Caracas, Venezuela	1st	110 m hurdles	15.39
1960	Ibero-American Games	Santiago, Chile	6th	110 m hurdles	15.5
1961	South American Championships	Lima, Peru	3rd	110 m hurdles	15.0
1961	Bolivarian Games	Barranquilla, Colombia	1st	110 m hurdles	14.8
1962	Central American and Caribbean Games	Kingston, Jamaica	6th	110 m hurdles	15.5
1962	Ibero-American Games	Madrid, Spain	3rd	110 m hurdles	14.9

== Personal bests ==
- 110 metres hurdles – 14.6h (1951)
- High jump – 1.91 m (1953)
