= René Ahumada =

Mexican sprinter

Personal information
- Full name: René Ahumada Rodríguez
- Nationality: Mexican
- Born: 1935 (age 90–91)
- Height: 1.75 m (5 ft 9 in)
- Weight: 66 kg (146 lb)

Sport
- Sport: Sprinting
- Event: 100 metres

René Ahumada Rodríguez (born 1935) is a Mexican sprinter. He competed in the men's 100 metres at the 1956 Summer Olympics.

At the 1957 National Invitation track meeting (competing against American collegiate teams), Ahumada won the silver medal in the 200 metres representing the National Autonomous University of Mexico, where he studied. In 1958, Ahumada was part of the Modesto Junior College Pirates track and field team, having run 10.0 seconds in the 100 yards. By the end of that year, Ahumada had a 9.6-second 100 yards personal best.

Ahumada studied physical education and recreation at Modesto Junior College while studying as a foreign national.

== International competitions ==
Year	Competition	Venue	Position	Event	Notes
Representing Mexico
1955	Pan American Games	Mexico City, Mexico	14th (sf)	100 m	11.12
1955	Pan American Games	Mexico City, Mexico	3rd	4 × 100 m relay	41.94
1956	Olympic Games	Melbourne, Australia	42nd (h)	100 m	11.26
1956	Olympic Games	Melbourne, Australia	24th (h)	200 m	21.96
1959	Central American and Caribbean Games	Caracas, Venezuela	15th (h)	100 m	11.8
1960	Ibero-American Games	Santiago, Chile	4th	100 m	10.8
1960	Ibero-American Games	Santiago, Chile	7th (sf)	200 m	21.7
1960	Ibero-American Games	Santiago, Chile	5th	400 m	48.8
1960	Ibero-American Games	Santiago, Chile	9th (h)	4 × 400 m relay	3:21.6

== Personal bests ==
- 100 metres – 10.5h (1956)
- 200 metres – 21.3h (1960)
