= Joaquim Ferreira =

Joaquim Ferreira may refer to:

- Joaquim Ferreira (rugby union) (born 1973), Portuguese rugby union footballer
- Joaquim Ferreira (footballer), Portuguese association footballer active 1920–1933
- Joaquim Ferreira (runner) (born 1937), Portuguese middle-distance runner
