= Gumersindo Gómez (athlete) =

Argentine long-distance runner (1929-2010)

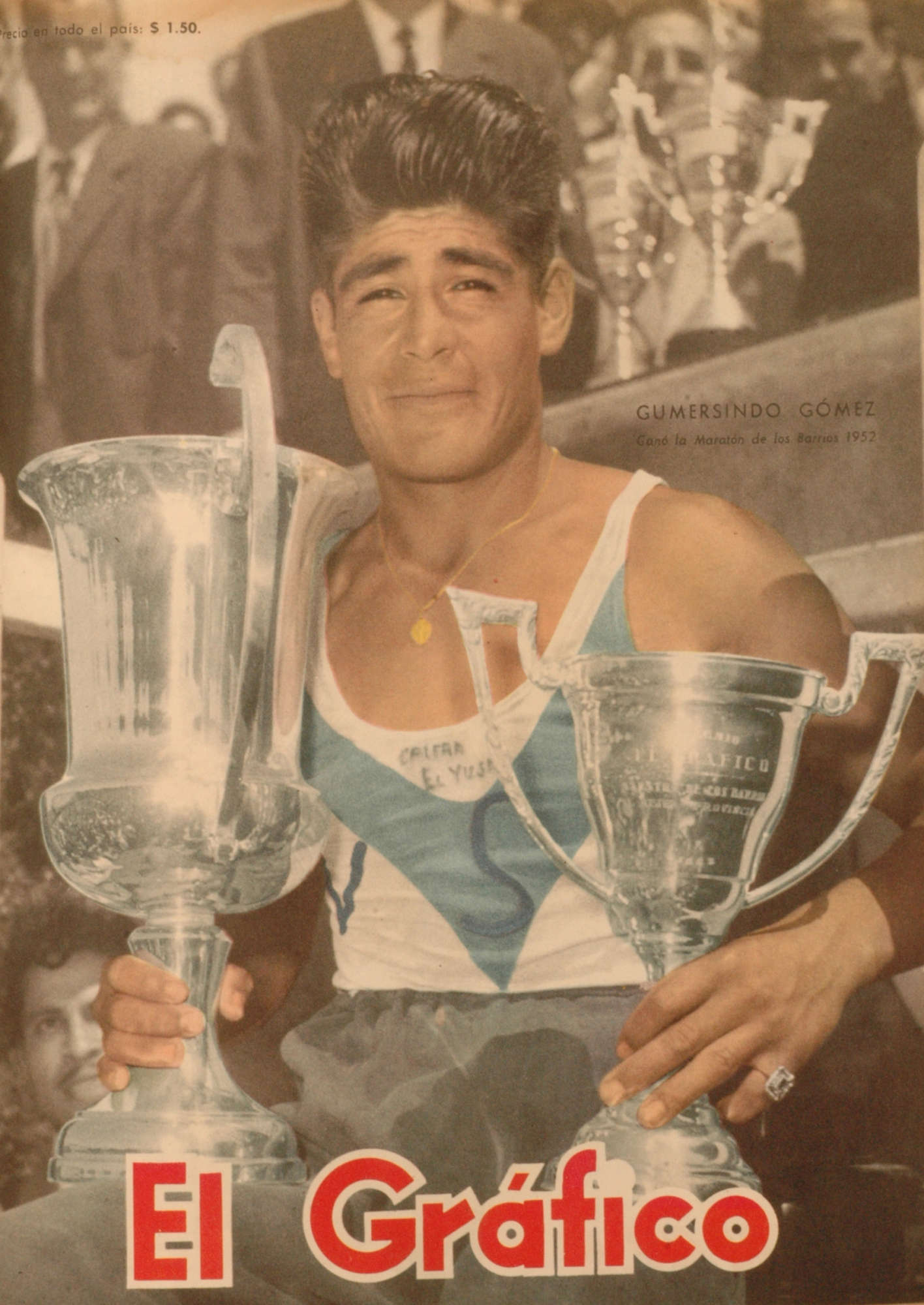
- Gómez in 1952

Personal information
- Full name: Gumersindo Leoncio Gómez
- Born: 13 January 1929 Villa Allende, Argentina
- Died: 14 March 2010 (aged 81) Córdoba, Argentina
- Height: 1.63 m (5 ft 4 in)
- Weight: 60 kg (132 lb)

Sport
- Sport: Long-distance running
- Event: Marathon
Medal record
Men's Athletics
Representing Argentina
Ibero-American Games
Silver medal – second place	1960 Santiago	Marathon

Gumersindo Leoncio Gómez (13 January 1929 – 14 March 2010) was an Argentine long-distance runner. He competed in the marathon at the 1960 Summer Olympics. His leg was amputated in 2009 after a car accident, and died of related complications the next year.

== International competitions ==
Year	Competition	Venue	Position	Event	Notes
Representing Argentina
1960	Olympic Games	Rome, Italy	15th	Marathon	2:23:00
1960	Ibero-American Games	Santiago, Chile	5th	10,000 m	31:35.6
1960	Ibero-American Games	Santiago, Chile	2nd	Marathon	2:38:33
1961	South American Championships	Lima, Peru	4th	10,000 m	31:27.8
1961	South American Championships	Lima, Peru	6th	Marathon	NT

== Personal bests ==
- Marathon – 2:23:00 (1960)
