= Ramón Rosario =

Puerto Rican shot putter

Ramón Rosario Rodríguez (10 September 1927 in Orocovis, Puerto Rico – 24 July 2014) was a Puerto Rican shot putter who competed in the 1952 Summer Olympics.

== International competitions ==
| Year | Competition | Venue | Position | Event | Notes |
Representing Puerto Rico
| 1950 | Central American and Caribbean Games | Guatemala City, Guatemala | 5th | Shot put | 13.04 m |
| 1952 | Olympic Games | Helsinki, Finland | 16th (q) | Shot put | 14.21 m |
| 1954 | Central American and Caribbean Games | Mexico City, Mexico | 1st | Shot put | 14.46 m |
| 1954 | Central American and Caribbean Games | Mexico City, Mexico | 5th | Discus throw | 38.62 m |
| 1959 | Central American and Caribbean Games | Caracas, Venezuela | 2nd | Shot put | 14.48 m |
| 1959 | Central American and Caribbean Games | Caracas, Venezuela | 5th | Discus throw | 41.39 m |
| 1960 | Ibero-American Games | Santiago, Chile | 10th | Shot put | 13.48 m |
| 1960 | Ibero-American Games | Santiago, Chile | 16th (q) | Discus throw | 36.79 m |
| 1962 | Central American and Caribbean Games | Kingston, Jamaica | 3rd | Shot put | 13.96 m |
| 1966 | Central American and Caribbean Games | San Juan, Puerto Rico | 6th | Shot put | 15.01 m |
