= Athletics at the 1959 Pan American Games – Women's 100 metres =

Women's 100 metres at the Pan American Games

The women's 100 metres event at the 1959 Pan American Games was held at the Soldier Field in Chicago on 29 and 30 August.

== Medalists ==
| Gold | Silver | Bronze |
|---|---|---|
| Lucinda Williams; United States | Wilma Rudolph; United States | Carlota Gooden; Panama |

== Results ==
=== Heats ===
Held on 29 August

Wind:
Heat 1: +1.6 m/s, Heat 2: +2.6 m/s, Heat 3: +2.5 m/s, Heat 4: +2.0 m/s

| Rank | Heat | Name | Nationality | Time | Notes |
|---|---|---|---|---|---|
| 1 | 1 | Barbara Jones | United States | 11.9 | Q |
| 2 | 1 | Onereida Borges | Cuba | 12.6 | Q |
| 3 | 1 | Marcela Daniel | Panama | 12.8 | Q |
| 4 | 1 | Yolanda Vincourt | Mexico | 13.2 | Q |
| 5 | 1 | Teresa Kuniyoshi | Peru | 13.4 | |
| 1 | 2 | Wilma Rudolph | United States | 11.9 | Q |
| 2 | 2 | Sally McCallum | Canada | 12.7 | Q |
| 3 | 2 | Myra Fawcett | British Guiana | 12.8 | Q |
| 4 | 2 | Rosalia Ridaura | Mexico | 13.3 | Q |
| | 2 | Wanda dos Santos | Brazil | DNS | |
| 1 | 3 | Lucinda Williams | United States | 11.9 | Q |
| 2 | 3 | Jean Holmes | Panama | 12.5 | Q |
| 3 | 3 | Lidia Hernández | Cuba | 12.5 | Q |
| 4 | 3 | Heather Campbell | Canada | 12.6 | Q |
| | 3 | Iris dos Santos | Brazil | DNS | |
| 1 | 4 | Carlota Gooden | Panama | 11.7 | Q |
| 2 | 4 | Valerie Jerome | Canada | 12.3 | Q |
| 3 | 4 | Vilma Parris | British Guiana | 13.2 | Q |
| 4 | 4 | Benilda Ascanio | Venezuela | 13.2 | Q |
| 5 | 4 | Maria de Lima | Brazil | 13.4 | |

=== Semifinals ===
Held on 29 August

Wind:
Heat 1: +0.9 m/s, Heat 2: +1.8 m/s

| Rank | Heat | Name | Nationality | Time | Notes |
|---|---|---|---|---|---|
| 1 | 1 | Lucinda Williams | United States | 11.9 | Q |
| 2 | 1 | Valerie Jerome | Canada | 12.4 | Q |
| 3 | 1 | Heather Campbell | Canada | 12.7 | Q |
| 4 | 1 | Onereida Borges | Cuba | 12.7 | Q |
| 5 | 1 | Marcela Daniel | Panama | 12.8 | |
| 6 | 1 | Myra Fawcett | British Guiana | 12.9 | |
| 7 | 1 | Rosalia Ridaura | Mexico | ??.? | |
| | 1 | Barbara Jones | United States | DNF | |
| 1 | 2 | Wilma Rudolph | United States | 11.8 | Q |
| 2 | 2 | Carlota Gooden | Panama | 11.8 | Q |
| 3 | 2 | Sally McCallum | Canada | 12.4 | Q |
| 4 | 2 | Jean Holmes | Panama | 12.6 | Q |
| 5 | 2 | Lidia Hernández | Cuba | 12.6 | |
| 6 | 2 | Vilma Parris | British Guiana | 13.1 | |
| 7 | 1 | Yolanda Vincourt | Mexico | ??.? | |
| 8 | 1 | Benilda Ascanio | Venezuela | ??.? | |

=== Final ===
Held on 30 August

Wind: -1.1 m/s

| Rank | Name | Nationality | Time | Notes |
|---|---|---|---|---|
| 1st place, gold medalist(s) | Lucinda Williams | United States | 12.1 | |
| 2nd place, silver medalist(s) | Wilma Rudolph | United States | 12.3 | |
| 3rd place, bronze medalist(s) | Carlota Gooden | Panama | 12.3 | |
| 4 | Valerie Jerome | Canada | 12.6 | |
| 5 | Sally McCallum | Canada | 12.6 | |
| 6 | Heather Campbell | Canada | 12.8 | |
| 7 | Jean Holmes | Panama | 12.8 | |
| 8 | Onereida Borges | Cuba | 12.9 | |
