= Athletics at the 1959 Pan American Games – Women's high jump =

Women's high jump at the Pan American Games

The women's high jump event at the 1959 Pan American Games was held at the Soldier Field in Chicago on 1 September.

== Results ==
Rank	Name	Nationality	Result	Notes
1st place, gold medalist(s)	Ann Marie Flynn	United States	1.61	
2nd place, silver medalist(s)	Renata Friedrichs	Chile	1.50	
2nd place, silver medalist(s)	Alice Whitty	Canada	1.50	
4	Ann Roniger	United States	1.50	
5	Nelly Gómez	Chile	1.45	
5	Maria de Lima	Brazil	1.45	
7	Naomi Rogers	United States	1.45	
8	Alejandrina Herrera	Cuba	1.45	
9	Valerie Jerome	Canada	1.40	
10	Benilda Ascanio	Venezuela	1.40	
11	Alicia Cárdenas	Mexico	1.35	
	Marlene Ahrens	Chile	DNS	
	Lorraine Dunn	Panama	DNS	
	Silvia Hunte	Panama	DNS	
	Patricia Power	Canada	DNS	
