= Nancy Correa =

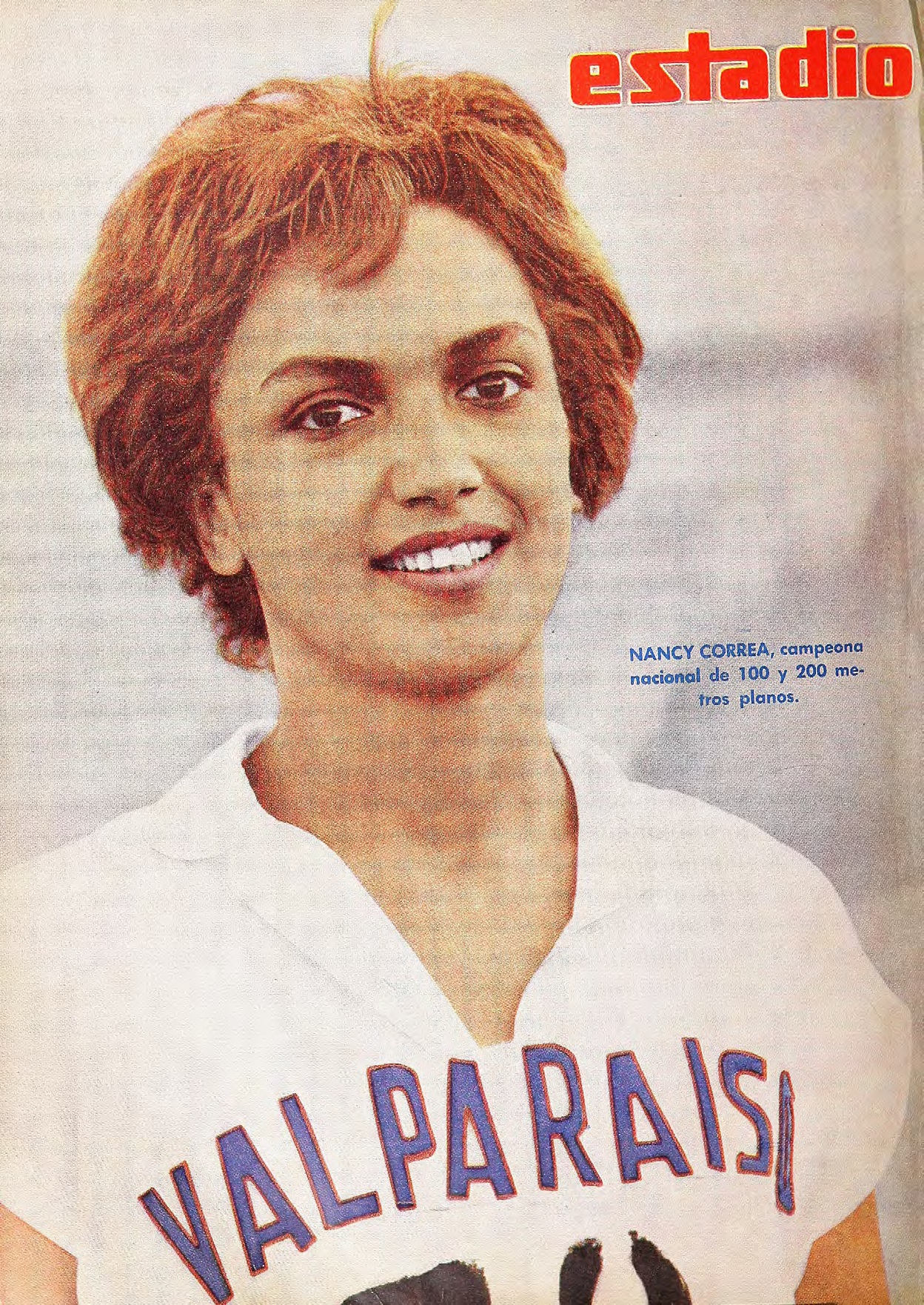
- Nancy Correa in 1961

Personal information
- Nationality: Chilean
- Born: 1940 (age 85–86) Valparaíso, Chile

Sport
- Sport: Athletics
- Event(s): 100 metres, long jump

Nancy Correa (born 1940) is a retired Chilean sprinter who specialised in the 100 metres. She won multiple medals for her country at regional level.

== International competitions ==
Year	Competition	Venue	Position	Event	Notes
Representing Chile
1958	South American Championships	Montevideo, Uruguay	3rd	100 m	12.5
1958	South American Championships	Montevideo, Uruguay	6th	200 m	26.4
1958	South American Championships	Montevideo, Uruguay	2nd	4 × 100 m relay	50.2
1958	South American Championships	Montevideo, Uruguay	4th	Long jump	5.27 m
1960	Ibero-American Games	Santiago, Chile	4th	100 m	12.4
1960	Ibero-American Games	Santiago, Chile	6th	200 m	26.4
1960	Ibero-American Games	Santiago, Chile	3rd	4 × 100 m relay	49.2
1960	Ibero-American Games	Santiago, Chile	4th	Long jump	5.19 m
1961	South American Championships	Lima, Peru	2nd	100 m	12.4
1961	South American Championships	Lima, Peru	6th (h)	200 m	26.6
1961	South American Championships	Lima, Peru	3rd	4 × 100 m relay	49.2
1962	Ibero-American Games	Madrid, Spain	3rd	100 m	12.4
1962	Ibero-American Games	Madrid, Spain	4th (h)	200 m	26.3
1962	Ibero-American Games	Madrid, Spain	1st	4 × 100 m relay	48.7

== Personal bests ==
- 100 metres – 12.2h (1960)
