= Víctor Peralta (athlete) =

Mexican long-distance runner

Personal information
- Born: September 16, 1942 (age 83)
- Height: 1.60 m (5 ft 3 in)
- Weight: 52 kg (115 lb)
Medal record
Men's Athletics
Representing Mexico
Central American and Caribbean Games
Bronze medal – third place	1962 Kingston	Half Marathon

Víctor Peralta Jiménez (born September 16, 1942) is a retired long-distance runner from Chimalhuacán, State of México, Mexico, who won the bronze medal in the men's half marathon at the 1962 Central American and Caribbean Games in Kingston, Jamaica. He competed at the 1964 Summer Olympics in Tokyo, Japan, finishing in 53rd place in the men's marathon.

== International competitions ==
Year	Competition	Venue	Position	Event	Notes
Representing Mexico
1962	Central American and Caribbean Games	Kingston, Jamaica	3rd	Half marathon	1:13:21
1964	Olympic Games	Tokyo, Japan	53rd	Marathon	2:44:24
