= Jean Holmes-Mitchell =

Panamanian sprinter

Personal information
- Full name: Jean Winnifred Holmes-Mitchell
- Born: 7 November 1940 (age 85) Panama City, Panama
- Height: 1.62 m (5 ft 4 in)
- Weight: 52 kg (115 lb)

Sport
- Sport: Sprinting
- Event: 100 metres

Jean Winnifred Holmes-Mitchell (born 7 November 1940) is a Panamanian sprinter. She competed in the women's 100 metres at the 1960 Summer Olympics. She finished second in the 1959 Pan American Games 4 × 100 metres Relay (with Carlota Gooden, Marcela Daniel, and Silvia Hunte). At the 1963 Pan American Games Holmes finished fourth in the 100 metres event.

== International competitions ==
Year	Competition	Venue	Position	Event	Notes
Representing Panama
1959	Central American and Caribbean Games	Caracas, Venezuela	1st	100 m	13.04
1959	Central American and Caribbean Games	Caracas, Venezuela	1st	4 × 100 m relay	50.51
1959	Pan American Games	Chicago, United States	6th	60 m	7.7
1959	Pan American Games	Chicago, United States	7th	100 m	12.8
1959	Pan American Games	Chicago, United States	2nd	4 × 100 m relay	48.2
1960	Olympic Games	Rome, Italy	17th (qf)	100 m	12.39
1960	Olympic Games	Rome, Italy	6th (h)	4 × 100 m relay	46.66
1960	Ibero-American Games	Santiago, Chile	2nd (h)	100 m	12.2^{1}
1960	Ibero-American Games	Santiago, Chile	1st	200 m	24.8
1960	Ibero-American Games	Santiago, Chile	1st	4 × 100 m relay	47.2
1961	Bolivarian Games	Barranquilla, Colombia	1st	100 m	12.1
1961	Bolivarian Games	Barranquilla, Colombia	1st	200 m	25.4
1961	Bolivarian Games	Barranquilla, Colombia	1st	4 × 100 m relay	50.0
1963	Pan American Games	São Paulo, Brazil	4th	100 m	12.00
1963	Pan American Games	São Paulo, Brazil	4th	4 × 100 m relay	48.31
1964	Olympic Games	Tokyo, Japan	12th (h)	4 × 100 m relay	47.6

^{1}Disqualified in the final

== Personal bests ==
- 100 metres – 11.7h (1960)
