= Carlota Gooden =

Panamanian sprinter

Personal information
- Born: 7 June 1936 (age 89) Panama City, Panama
- Height: 1.60 m (5 ft 3 in)
- Weight: 52 kg (115 lb)

Sport
- Sport: Sprinting
- Event: 100 metres

Carlota Gooden (born 7 June 1936) is a Panamanian sprinter. She was the first woman to represent Panama at the Olympics.

She competed in the women's 100 metres at the 1960 Summer Olympics. She finished second in the 1959 Pan American Games 4 × 100 metres Relay (with Jean Holmes-Mitchell, Marcela Daniel, and Silvia Hunte), third in the 1959 Pan American Games 60 metres and third in the 1959 Pan American Games 100 metres. She was descended from Barbadian canal workers. In 1955, she earned an athletic scholarship to Tuskegee University, one of the premier African American women's track programs.

== International competitions ==
Year	Competition	Venue	Position	Event	Notes
Representing Panama
1951	Bolivarian Games	Caracas, Venezuela	1st	60 m	6.5
1951	Bolivarian Games	Caracas, Venezuela	1st	100 m	12.5
1951	Bolivarian Games	Caracas, Venezuela	1st	4 × 100 m relay	49.5
1954	Central American and Caribbean Games	Mexico City, Mexico	1st	100 m	12.32
1954	Central American and Caribbean Games	Mexico City, Mexico	1st	4 × 100 m relay	47.49
1959	Pan American Games	Chicago, United States	3rd	60 m	7.4
1959	Pan American Games	Chicago, United States	3rd	100 m	12.3
1959	Pan American Games	Chicago, United States	2nd	4 × 100 m relay	48.2
1960	Olympic Games	Rome, Italy	25th (qf)	100 m	12.70
1960	Olympic Games	Rome, Italy	6th (h)	4 × 100 m relay	46.66
1960	Ibero-American Games	Santiago, Chile	1st	100 m	11.9
1960	Ibero-American Games	Santiago, Chile	1st	4 × 100 m relay	47.2

== Personal bests ==
- 100 metres – 11.6h (1960)
