= José Luis Villalongo =

Puerto Rican sprinter

Personal information
- Full name: José Luis Villalongo Cepeda
- Nationality: Puerto Rican
- Born: 27 April 1938 Santurce, Puerto Rico
- Died: 24 September 2018 (aged 80)
- Height: 1.80 m (5 ft 11 in)
- Weight: 68 kg (150 lb)

Sport
- Sport: Sprinting
- Event: 400 metres
Medal record
Men's Athletics
Representing Puerto Rico
Ibero-American Games
| Gold medal – first place | 1960 Santiago | 4x400 m relay |

José Luis Villalongo Cepeda (27 April 1938 – 24 September 2018) was a Puerto Rican sprinter. He competed in the men's 4 × 400 metres relay at the 1960 Summer Olympics and 1959 Pan American Games.

== International competitions ==
| Year | Competition | Venue | Position | Event | Notes |
Representing Puerto Rico
| 1959 | Pan American Games | Chicago, United States | 11th (h) | 400 m | 49.3^{1} |
| 1960 | Olympic Games | Rome, Italy | 14th (h) | 4 × 400 m relay | 3:13.91 |
| 1960 | Ibero-American Games | Santiago, Chile | 5th | 200 m | 21.9 |
| 1960 | Ibero-American Games | Santiago, Chile | 6th | 400 m | 49.5 |
| 1960 | Ibero-American Games | Santiago, Chile | 6th (h) | 4 × 100 m relay | 42.6 |
| 1960 | Ibero-American Games | Santiago, Chile | 1st | 4 × 400 m relay | 3:12.8 |
| 1962 | Central American and Caribbean Games | Kingston, Jamaica | 17th (h) | 400 m | 50.0 |
| 1962 | Central American and Caribbean Games | Kingston, Jamaica | 3rd | 4 × 400 m relay | 3:15.8 |
| 1962 | Ibero-American Games | Madrid, Spain | 2nd | 4 × 400 m relay | 3:16.4 |
| 1966 | Central American and Caribbean Games | San Juan, Puerto Rico | 17th (h) | 400 m | 49.8 |

^{1}Did not start in the semimfinals

== Personal bests ==
- 400 metres – 46.9h y (1966)
