= Clive Bonas =

Venezuelan sprinter and long jumper

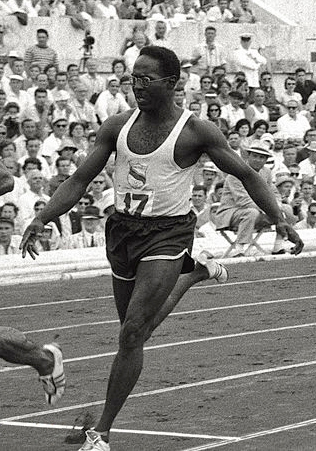
- Clive Bonas at the 1960 Olympics

Personal information
- Full name: Clive Alex Bonas Simmons
- Born: 3 April 1933 (age 93) Lagunillas, Zulia, Venezuela
- Height: 1.70 m (5 ft 7 in)
- Weight: 64 kg (141 lb)

Sport
- Sport: Athletics
- Events: Sprint, long jump

Achievements and titles
- Personal bests: 100 m – 10.4 (1956); LJ – 7.34 m (1954)
Medal record
Representing Venezuela
Pan American Games
Silver medal – second place	1955 Mexico City	4×100 m relay
Silver medal – second place	1959 Chicago	4×100 m relay

Clive Alex Bonas Simmons (born 3 April 1933) is a retired Venezuelan track athlete. He competed at the 1956 Olympics in the 100 m and 4 × 100 m sprint and at the 1960 Olympics in the long jump and 4 × 100 m sprint. His best achievement was fifth place in 1960 in the sprint relay, in which he also won two silver medals at the 1955 and 1959 Pan American Games.

== International competitions ==
Year	Competition	Venue	Position	Event	Notes
Representing Venezuela
1955	Pan American Games	Mexico City, Mexico	7th (sf)	100 m	10.75
1955	Pan American Games	Mexico City, Mexico	2nd	4 × 100 m relay	41.36
1956	Olympic Games	Melbourne, Australia	35th (h)	100 m	11.17
1956	Olympic Games	Melbourne, Australia	13th (h)	4 × 100 m relay	42.0
1959	Central American and Caribbean Games	Caracas, Venezuela	1st	4 × 100 m relay	42.14
1959	Central American and Caribbean Games	Caracas, Venezuela	4th	Long jump	6.60 m
1959	Pan American Games	Chicago, United States	13th (sf)	100 m	10.7
1959	Pan American Games	Chicago, United States	2nd	4 × 100 m relay	41.1
1960	Olympic Games	Rome, Italy	5th	4 × 100 m relay	40.83
1960	Olympic Games	Rome, Italy	–	Long jump	NM
1961	South American Championships	Lima, Peru	1st	4 x 100 m relay	41.0
1961	Bolivarian Games	Barranquilla, Colombia	3rd	Long jump	6.81 m
1963	South American Championships	Cali, Colombia	7th (sf)	100 m	10.5 (w)
