= Emilio Romero (sprinter) =

Venezuelan sprinter (born 1937)

Personal information
- Born: 28 May 1937 (age 89) Quiriquire, Venezuela
- Height: 1.67 m (5 ft 6 in)
- Weight: 65 kg (143 lb)

Sport
- Sport: Athletics
- Events: 100 metres, 200 metres

Emilio Romero Nicolsin (born 28 May 1937) is a Venezuelan sprinter. He competed in the men's 4 × 100 metres relay at the 1960 Summer Olympics.

== International competitions ==
Year	Competition	Venue	Position	Event	Notes
Representing Venezuela
1959	Central American and Caribbean Games	Caracas, Venezuela	6th (h)	400 m	50.0
1959	Central American and Caribbean Games	Caracas, Venezuela	2nd	4 × 400 m relay	3:22.88
1959	Pan American Games	Chicago, United States	10th (sf)	400 m	49.4
1959	Pan American Games	Chicago, United States	2nd	4 × 100 m relay	41.1
1959	Pan American Games	Chicago, United States	5th (h)	4 × 400 m relay	3:17.8
1960	Olympic Games	Rome, Italy	5th	4 × 100 m relay	40.83
1960	Ibero-American Games	Santiago, Chile	8th (sf)	400 m	49.8
1960	Ibero-American Games	Santiago, Chile	1st	4 × 100 m relay	40.3
1960	Ibero-American Games	Santiago, Chile	8th (h)	4 × 400 m relay	3:20.9
1961	South American Championships	Lima, Peru	10th (sf)	400 m	52.4
1961	South American Championships	Lima, Peru	1st	4 x 400 m relay	3:16.0
1963	South American Championships	Cali, Colombia	8th (sf)	200 m	22.2
