= Athletics at the 1959 Pan American Games – Men's 3000 metres steeplechase =

Men's 3,000 metres steeplechase at the Pan American Games

The men's 3000 metres steeplechase event at the 1959 Pan American Games was held at the Soldier Field in Chicago on 1 September.

== Results ==
Rank	Name	Nationality	Time	Notes
1st place, gold medalist(s)	Phil Coleman	United States	8:56.4	
2nd place, silver medalist(s)	Deacon Jones	United States	8:56.6	
3rd place, bronze medalist(s)	Alfredo Tinoco	Mexico	8:58.0	
4	Sebastião Mendes	Brazil	9:02.2	
5	George Young	United States	9:07.8	
6	Alberto Ríos	Argentina	9:08.0	
7	Francisco Allen	Chile	?:??.?	
8	Domingo Amaizón	Argentina	?:??.?	
9	Luciano Gómez	Mexico	9:31.2	
10	Eligio Galicia	Mexico	9:39.0	
11	Ron Wallingford	Canada	9:41.8	
	Luis Bocanegra	Argentina	DNF	
	David Drybrough	Canada	DNF	
	Jesús Queche	Guatemala	DNF	
