= Athletics at the 1961 Bolivarian Games =

Athletics at the IV Bolivarian Games
- Dates: December
- Host city: Barranquilla, Colombia
- Level: Senior
- Events: 30 (21 men, 9 women)

Athletics competitions at the 1961 Bolivarian Games were held in Barranquilla, Colombia, in December, 1961.

A detailed history of the early editions of the Bolivarian Games between 1938 and 1989 was published in a book written (in Spanish) by José Gamarra Zorrilla, former president of the Bolivian Olympic Committee, and first president (1976-1982) of ODESUR. Gold medal winners from Ecuador were published by the Comité Olímpico Ecuatoriano.

A total of 30 events were contested, 21 by men and 9 by women.

== Medal summary ==
Medal winners were published.

=== Men ===
Event	Gold		Silver		Bronze	
100 metres	Horacio Esteves (VEN)	10.4	Rafael Romero (VEN)	10.6	Sidney Dobrs (PAN)	10.8
200 metres	Rafael Romero (VEN)	21.4	Horacio Esteves (VEN)	21.5	Mario Brown (PAN)	22.3
400 metres	Humberto Brown (PAN)	49.0	Pedro Grajales (COL)	49.9	Arístides Pineda (VEN)	50.3
800 metres	José Neira (COL)	1:53.0	Álvaro Mejía (COL)	1:55.5	Harley Romero (COL)	1:57.7
1500 metres	José Neira (COL)	4:00.1	Álvaro Mejía (COL)	4:02.7	Harvey Borrero (COL)	4:06.3
5000 metres	Manuel Cabrera (COL)	16:14.2	José Chacón (COL)	16:15.0	Luis Navas (COL)	16:45.9
10,000 metres	Manuel Cabrera (COL)	34:03.1	Luis Navas (COL)	34:04.8	Hernán Barreneche (COL)	34:36.5
Half Marathon	Luis Navas (COL)	1:11:58	Hernán Barreneche (COL)	1:12:29	Florentino Oropesa (VEN)	1:14:27
110 metres hurdles	Teófilo Davis Bell (VEN)	14.8	Juan Muñoz (VEN)	14.8	Arturo Perkins (PAN)	15.1
400 metres hurdles	Víctor Maldonado (VEN)	54.0	Arístides Pineda (VEN)	55.1	Arturo Perkins (PAN)	55.3
4 x 100 metres relay	Venezuela ? ? Rafael Romero; Horacio Esteves	42.0	Panama ? Humberto Brown; Mario Brown; Sydney Dobbs	42.8	Colombia	43.8
4 x 400 metres relay	Venezuela	3:21.8	Colombia ? ? ? Pedro Grajales	3:26.0	Panama	3:26.3
High jump	Roberto Abugattás (PER)	1.80	Ramón Bastardo (VEN)	1.75	Héctor Thomas (VEN)	1.75
Pole vault	César Quintero (COL)	3.80	Brígido Iriarte (VEN)	3.70	José Restrepo (COL)	3.40
Long jump	Juan Muñoz (VEN)	7.22	Ramón Bastardo (VEN)	6.89	Clive Bonas (VEN)	6.81
Triple jump	Asnoldo Devonish (VEN)	14.13	Olguer Ortiz (COL)	13.32	Juan Muñoz (VEN)	13.32
Shot put	José Bracho (VEN)	14.45	Héctor Thomas (VEN)	13.93	Dagoberto González (COL)	13.79
Discus throw	Dagoberto González (COL)	46.05	Héctor Thomas (VEN)	45.42	Daniel Cereali (VEN)	44.09
Hammer throw	Daniel Cereali (VEN)	50.43	Marcelino Borrero (COL)	47.05	Luis Vargas (COL)	45.12
Javelin throw	Jesús Rodríguez (VEN)	67.24	Héctor Thomas (VEN)	66.43	Luis Zárate (PER)	60.83
Pentathlon	Héctor Thomas (VEN)	3161	Roberto Caravaca (VEN)	2648	Hernando Gutiérrez (COL)	2548

=== Women ===
Event	Gold		Silver		Bronze	
100 metres	Jean Holmes (PAN)	12.1	Silvia Hunte (PAN)	12.5	Jean Price (PAN)	13.0
200 metres	Jean Holmes (PAN)	25.4	Silvia Hunte (PAN)	26.5	Jean Price (PAN)	26.9
80 metres hurdles	Benilda Ascanio (VEN)	12.6	Nerva Matheus (VEN)	13.6	Nubia Sánchez (COL)	13.8
4 x 100 metres relay	Panama; Josephine Sobers; Jean Price; Silvia Hunte; Jean Holmes-Mitchell	50.0	Colombia; Nubia Sánchez; Alba López; Ana Alvarado; Smirna Paz	51.7	Venezuela; Elizabeth Díaz; Marisela De Díaz; Gisela Vidal; Benilda Ascanio	52.3
High jump	Lidia Velasco (COL)	1.50	Benilda Ascanio (VEN)	1.40	Carmen Méndez (VEN)	1.40
Long jump	Benilda Ascanio (VEN)	4.91	Gisela Vidal (VEN)	4.83	Alba López (COL)	4.77
Shot put	Francisca Roberts (VEN)	12.10	Mercedes García (VEN)	10.70	Nerva Matheus (VEN)	10.64
Discus throw	Mercedes García (VEN)	35.67	Ana Sánchez (COL)	34.20	Raquel Ortiz (COL)	33.86
Javelin throw	Alba López (COL)	34.91	Francisca Roberts (VEN)	32.92	Emma Alvear (COL)	32.48

== Medal table (unofficial) ==
* Host nation (Colombia)

Rank	Nation	Gold	Silver	Bronze	Total
1	Venezuela (VEN)	16	16	9	41
2	Colombia (COL)*	9	11	13	33
3	Panama (PAN)	4	3	7	14
4	Peru (PER)	1	0	1	2
Totals (4 entries)		30	30	30	90
