= Germán Guenard =

Puerto Rican sprinter

German Guenard
Personal information
- Nationality: Puerto Rican
- Born: 18 October 1942 (age 83) Mayagüez, Puerto Rico
- Height: 1.76 m (5 ft 9 in)
- Weight: 66 kg (146 lb)

Sport
- Sport: Sprinting
- Event: 400 metres

German Guenard Soltero (born 18 October 1942) is a Puerto Rican sprinter. He competed in the men's 400 metres at the 1960 Summer Olympics.

== International competitions ==
Year	Competition	Venue	Position	Event	Notes
Representing Puerto Rico
1960	Olympic Games	Rome, Italy	15th (h)	400 m	47.2
1960	Olympic Games	Rome, Italy	14th (h)	4 × 400 m relay	3:13.91
1960	Ibero-American Games	Santiago, Chile	2nd	400 m	47.9
1960	Ibero-American Games	Santiago, Chile	1st	4 × 400 m relay	3:12.8
1962	Central American and Caribbean Games	Kingston, Jamaica	9th (sf)	400 m	49.5
1962	Central American and Caribbean Games	Kingston, Jamaica	3rd	4 × 400 m relay	3:15.8
1962	Ibero-American Games	Madrid, Spain	1st	400 m	47.3
1962	Ibero-American Games	Madrid, Spain	2nd	4 × 400 m relay	3:16.4
1966	Central American and Caribbean Games	San Juan, Puerto Rico	3rd	4 × 400 m relay	3:10.3

== Personal bests ==
- 400 metres – 47.39 (1960)
