= Athletics at the 1963 Pan American Games – Men's decathlon =

Men's decathlon at the Pan American Games

The men's decathlon event at the 1963 Pan American Games was held at the Pacaembu Stadium in São Paulo on 30 April and 1 May.

== Results ==
The highest mark recorded in each event is highlighted in yellow

Rank	Athlete	Nationality	100m	LJ	SP	HJ	400m	110m H	DT	PV	JT	1500m	Points	Notes
1st place, gold medalist(s)	J. D. Martin	United States	11.5	6.60	12.98	1.94	51.5	15.0	42.44	4.57	56.96	4:52.0	7335	
2nd place, silver medalist(s)	Bill Gairdner	Canada	11.0	6.52	13.71	1.72	48.8	15.2	39.35	3.50	47.43	4:27.5	6812	
3rd place, bronze medalist(s)	Héctor Thomas	Venezuela	10.8	7.01	14.49	1.74	52.3	16.8	41.66	3.70	62.68	5:02.0	6751	
4	Russ Hodge	United States	11.0	6.68	14.33	1.74	51.2	16.9	41.75	3.90	47.27	5:00.9	6331	
5	Cleomens da Cunha	Brazil	11.5	6.88	11.23	1.85	52.8	15.8	35.41	3.60	59.59	4:50.5	6236	
6	Roberto Caravaca	Venezuela	11.6	6.76	12.34	1.70	51.0	17.0	31.32	3.40	50.82	4:27.4	5845	
7	Marseno Martins	Brazil	11.2	6.44	12.01	1.72	53.4	16.0	35.80	3.70	46.27	4:52.0	5820	
