= Alfredo Tinoco =

Mexican former middle distance runner (born 1934)

Alfredo Tinoco Alaniz (born 13 March 1934 in Villa Carbon, Baja California Sur) is a Mexican former middle-distance runner who competed in the 1960 Summer Olympics.

== International competitions ==
Year	Competition	Venue	Position	Event	Notes
Representing Mexico
1959	Central American and Caribbean Games	Caracas, Venezuela	2nd	1500 m	4:06.00
1959	Central American and Caribbean Games	Caracas, Venezuela	1st	3000 m s'chase	10:50.8
1959	Pan American Games	Chicago, United States	4th	5000 m	14:43.8
1959	Pan American Games	Chicago, United States	3rd	3000 m s'chase	8:58.0
1960	Olympic Games	Rome, Italy	32nd (h)	3000 m s'chase	9:38.0

== Personal bests ==
- 3000 metres steeplechase – 8:58.0h (1959)
