= Athletics at the 1959 Central American and Caribbean Games =

Athletics at the VIII CAC Games
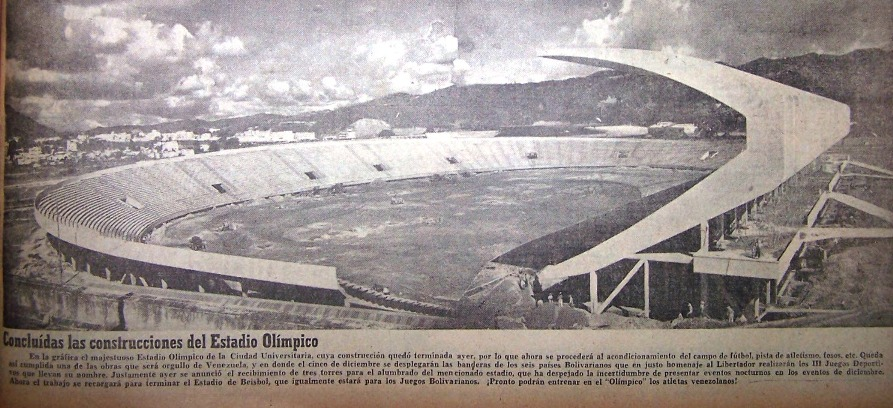
- Host stadium
- Dates: 7–12 January 1959
- Host city: Caracas, Venezuela
- Venue: Olympic Stadium
- Events: 28
- Participation: 176 athletes from 12 nations

The athletics competition in the 1959 Central American and Caribbean Games were held at the Olympic Stadium in Caracas, Venezuela between 7 and 12 January.

== Medal summary ==
=== Men's events ===
Event	Gold		Silver		Bronze	
100 metres	Manuel Rivera; Puerto Rico	10.87	Horacio Esteves; Venezuela	10.91	Lloyd Murad; Venezuela	10.92
200 metres	Manuel Rivera; Puerto Rico	21.79	Rafael Romero; Venezuela	21.92	Lloyd Murad; Venezuela	22.40
400 metres	Ovidio de Jesús; Puerto Rico	48.73	Iván Rodríguez; Puerto Rico	48.93	Evaristo Edie; Venezuela	49.98
800 metres	Ralph Gomes; British Guiana	1:57.7	Harvey Borrero; Colombia	1:58.4	Jorge Leal; Mexico	1:58.8
1500 metres	Harvey Borrero; Colombia	4:04.37 GR, NR	Alfredo Tinoco; Mexico	4:06.00	Ralph Gomes; British Guiana	4:08.16
5000 metres	Isidro Segura; Mexico	15:41.94 GR	Guadalupe Jiménez; Mexico	15:55.06	Marciano Castillo; Mexico	15:56.10
10,000 metres	Josafath Hernández; Mexico	32:51.36 GR	Isidro Segura; Mexico	32:59.17	Pedro Peralta; Mexico	33:25.51
Half marathon	Pedro Peralta; Mexico	1:10:29 GR	Pedro Alvarado; Mexico	1:11:47	Germán Lozano; Colombia	1:13:40
110 metres hurdles	Teófilo Davis Bell; Venezuela	15.39	Teófilo Colón; Puerto Rico	15.95	Víctor Maldonado; Venezuela	16.05
400 metres hurdles	Ovidio de Jesús; Puerto Rico	53.42	Víctor Maldonado; Venezuela	54.18	Oscar Fernández; Mexico	55.51
3000 metre steeplechase	Alfredo Tinoco; Mexico	10:50.8*	Luciano Gómez; Mexico	11:11.6*	Hernando Ruiz; Colombia	11:45.5*
4 × 100 metres relay	Venezuela; Clive Bonas; Lloyd Murad; Horacio Esteves; Rafael Romero	42.14	Puerto Rico; Miguel Rivera; Rubén Díaz; Ramón Vega; Manuel Rivera	42.27	Panama; Luis Carter; Humberto Brown; Martín Francis; Manuel Rivas	42.71
4 × 400 metres relay	Puerto Rico; Frank Rivera; Manuel Rivera; Ovidio de Jesús; Iván Rodríguez	3:16.91	Venezuela; Emilio Romero; Davis Welch; Guillermo Rocca; Evaristo Edie	3:22.88	Mexico; Rodolfo Ramírez; Oscar Fernández; Juan José Godínez; Jorge Terán	3:24.46
High jump	Teodoro Palacios; Guatemala	1.91	Julio Llera; Puerto Rico	1.91	Roberto Procel; Mexico	1.89
Pole vault	Rolando Cruz; Puerto Rico	4.40 GR	Rubén Cruz; Puerto Rico	3.96	Miguel Rivera; Puerto Rico	3.79
Long jump	Deryck Taylor; Jamaica	7.07	Julio Llera; Puerto Rico	6.67	Jesús Piña; Venezuela	6.60
Triple jump	Pedro Camacho; Puerto Rico	14.67	Rumildo Cruz; Puerto Rico	14.38	Julio Llera; Puerto Rico	14.32
Shot put	Eduardo Adriana; Netherlands Antilles	14.59 GR	Ramón Rosario; Puerto Rico	14.48	Rafael Trompiz; Venezuela	14.00
Discus throw	Daniel Cereali; Venezuela	44.95 GR	Mauricio Rodríguez; Venezuela	42.27	Omar Fierro; Mexico	42.16
Hammer throw	Daniel Cereali; Venezuela	51.17dh GR	Rubén Dávila; Puerto Rico	46.86dh	Francisco Fragoso; Mexico	46.75dh
Javelin throw	Carlos Fajer; Mexico	62.36	Santiago Durham; Mexico	59.65	Jesús Barbera; Venezuela	59.02
Pentathlon	Rodolfo Mijares; Mexico	2723	Héctor Román; Puerto Rico	2627	Héctor Thomas; Venezuela	2540

=== Women's events ===
Event	Gold		Silver		Bronze	
100 metres	Jean Holmes; Panama	13.04	Yolanda Vinocourt; Mexico	13.31	María Treviño; Mexico	13.33
80 metres hurdles	Guillermina Peña; Mexico	12.87	Benilde Ascanio; Venezuela	12.92	Silvia Hunte; Panama	13.43
4 × 100 metres relay	Panama; Marcela Daniel; Lorraine Dunn; Silvia Hunte; Jean Holmes	50.51 (50.5)	Mexico; Guillermina Peña; Raquel Trujillo; María Teresa Treviño; Yolanda Vincourt	51.81 (51.7)	Venezuela; Benilde Ascanio; Alvia Ford; Biserka de Vanich; Morella Ettedgui	53.26 (53.2)
High jump	Benilde Ascanio; Venezuela	1.43	Margarita Kabsch; Mexico	1.40	Silvia Hunte; Panama	1.40
Discus throw	Lili Schluter; Mexico	40.79 GR	Ivonne Rojano; Mexico	37.19	Nerva Matheus; Venezuela	31.04
Javelin throw	Berta Chiú; Mexico	35.21	Raquel Trujillo; Mexico	35.14	Mercedes García; Venezuela	34.75

== Medal table ==
Rank	Nation	Gold	Silver	Bronze	Total
1	Mexico (MEX)	9	11	9	29
2	Puerto Rico (PUR)	7	10	2	19
3	Venezuela (VEN)	5	6	11	22
4	Panama (PAN)	2	0	3	5
5	Colombia (COL)	1	1	2	4
6	British Guiana (BGU)	1	0	1	2
7	Guatemala (GUA)	1	0	0	1
7	Jamaica (JAM)	1	0	0	1
7	Netherlands Antilles (AHO)	1	0	0	1
Totals (9 entries)		28	28	28	84

== Participating nations ==
- British Guiana (2)
- Colombia (6)
- Costa Rica (2)
- Guatemala (9)
- Jamaica (4)
- Mexico (42)
- Netherlands Antilles (2)
- Nicaragua (1)
- Panama (12)
- Puerto Rico (38)
- El Salvador (3)
- Venezuela (55)
