= Joel Rocha =

Portuguese professional futsal coach (born 1981)

Personal information
- Full name: Joel Tiago Gonçalves Rocha
- Date of birth: 18 October 1981 (age 45)
- Place of birth: Covilhã, Portugal

Managerial career
- Years: Team
- 2008–2014: Fundão
- 2015–2021: Benfica
- 2021–: SC Braga

Joel Tiago Gonçalves Rocha (born 18 October 1981) is a Portuguese professional futsal coach and current manager of Sporting Clube de Braga/AAUM.

== Honours ==
Fundão

- Taça de Portugal: 2013–14
- Taça Nacional (women): 2008–09

Benfica

- Liga Portuguesa: 2014–15, 2018–19
- Taça de Portugal: 2014–15, 2016–17
- Taça da Liga: 2017–18, 2018–19, 2019–20
- Supertaça de Portugal: 2015, 2016
- UEFA Futsal Cup - Third place: 2015–16
