= José Albarrán =

Spanish sprinter

Personal information
- Full name: José Luis Albarrán Calles
- Nationality: Spanish
- Born: 29 April 1935 (age 91) Salamanca, Spain

Sport
- Sport: Sprinting
- Event: 100 metres

José Albarrán (born 29 April 1935) is a Spanish sprinter. He competed in the men's 100 metres at the 1960 Summer Olympics.
