= Héctor Thomas =

Venezuelan decathlete (1938–2008)

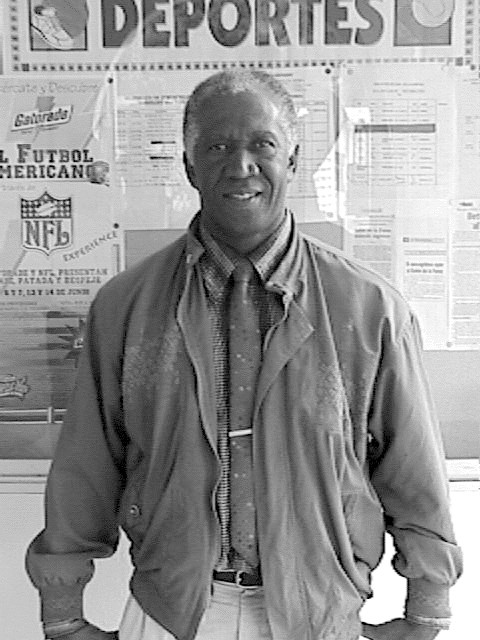
- Thomas in 1998

Personal information
- Full name: Héctor Tomás Thomas Martínez
- Born: 10 October 1938 El Callao, Bolívar, Venezuela
- Died: 23 December 2008 (aged 70) Caracas, Distrito Capital, Venezuela
- Height: 178 cm (5 ft 10 in)
- Weight: 80 kg (176 lb)

Sport
- Country: Venezuela
- Sport: Athletics
- Event: Decathlon

Achievements and titles
- Olympic finals: 1960, 1964
Medal record
Representing Venezuela
Pan American Games
Silver medal – second place	1963 São Paulo	4×100 m
Bronze medal – third place	1963 São Paulo	Decathlon
Silver medal – second place	1967 Winnipeg	Decathlon
Central American and Caribbean Games
Gold medal – first place	1962 Kingston	Pentathlon
Silver medal – second place	1962 Kingston	Shot put
Bolivarian Games
Gold medal – first place	1961 Barranquilla	Pentathlon
Silver medal – second place	1961 Barranquilla	Shot put
Silver medal – second place	1961 Barranquilla	Discus throw
Silver medal – second place	1961 Barranquilla	Javelin throw
Bronze medal – third place	1961 Barranquilla	High jump
Gold medal – first place	1965 Quito	Long jump
Gold medal – first place	1965 Quito	Pentathlon
Bronze medal – third place	1965 Quito	Pole vault
Bronze medal – third place	1965 Quito	Javelin throw
Silver medal – second place	1965 Quito	Shot put
Silver medal – second place	1965 Quito	Discus throw
Gold medal – first place	1970 Maracaibo	Pole vault
Gold medal – first place	1970 Maracaibo	Shot put
Gold medal – first place	1970 Maracaibo	Decathlon
Silver medal – second place	1973 Panama City	Pole vault
Ibero-American Games
Gold medal – first place	1960 Santiago	Decathlon

Héctor Tomás Thomas Martínez (10 October 1938 – 23 December 2008) was a decathlete from Venezuela.

== Career ==
He won more than ten medals in various athletics events at the Bolivarian Games from 1961 to 1973, as well as three medals at the Pan American Games in 1963 and 1967. He competed in the decathlon at the 1960 and 1964 Olympics, achieving his best result of 20th place in 1960. In 1998, he was inducted into the Venezuelan Sports Hall of Fame. He died of cancer at the age of 70.

== International competitions ==
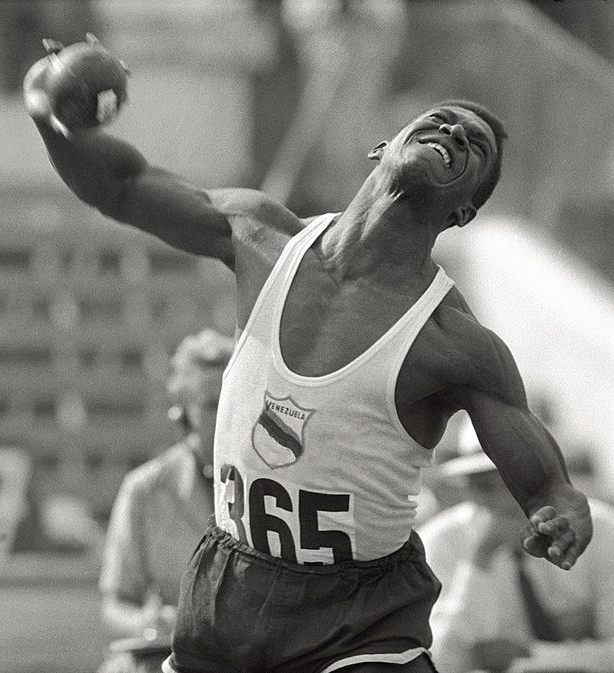
Thomas at the 1960 Olympics

Year	Competition	Venue	Position	Event	Notes
Representing Venezuela
1959	Central American and Caribbean Games	Caracas, Venezuela	7th	Shot put	12.94 m
1959	Central American and Caribbean Games	Caracas, Venezuela	3rd	Pentathlon	2540 pts
1959	Pan American Games	Chicago, United States	4th	Decathlon	5625 pts
1960	Olympic Games	Rome, Italy	20th	Decathlon	5753 pts
1960	Ibero-American Games	Santiago, Chile	7th	Shot put	13.99 m
1960	Ibero-American Games	Santiago, Chile	11th (q)	Discus throw	42.00 m
1960	Ibero-American Games	Santiago, Chile	1st	Decathlon	6928 pts
1961	South American Championships	Lima, Peru	3rd	Shot put	14.58 m
1961	South American Championships	Lima, Peru	7th	Decathlon	5544 pts
1961	Bolivarian Games	Barranquilla, Colombia	3rd	High jump	1.75 m
1961	Bolivarian Games	Barranquilla, Colombia	2nd	Shot put	13.93 m
1961	Bolivarian Games	Barranquilla, Colombia	2nd	Discus throw	45.42 m
1961	Bolivarian Games	Barranquilla, Colombia	2nd	Javelin throw	66.43 m
1961	Bolivarian Games	Barranquilla, Colombia	1st	Pentathlon	3161 pts
1962	Central American and Caribbean Games	Kingston, Jamaica	2nd	Shot put	14.46 m
1962	Central American and Caribbean Games	Kingston, Jamaica	4th	Javelin throw	61.17 m
1962	Central American and Caribbean Games	Kingston, Jamaica	1st	Pentathlon	3212 pts
1962	Ibero-American Games	Madrid, Spain	4th	Shot put	14.57 m
1962	Ibero-American Games	Madrid, Spain	15th (q)	Discus throw	41.63 m
1962	Ibero-American Games	Madrid, Spain	6th	Javelin throw	59.45 m
1962	Ibero-American Games	Madrid, Spain	1st	Decathlon	6630 pts
1963	Pan American Games	São Paulo, Brazil	2nd	4 × 100 m relay	40.71 m
1963	Pan American Games	São Paulo, Brazil	3rd	Decathlon	6751 pts
1963	South American Championships	Cali, Colombia	1st	Long jump	7.22 m
1963	South American Championships	Cali, Colombia	1st	Javelin throw	64.79 m
1963	South American Championships	Cali, Colombia	1st	Decathlon	6825 pts
1964	Olympic Games	Tokyo, Japan	–	Decathlon	DNF
1965	South American Championships	Rio de Janeiro, Brazil	2nd	100 m	10.5 s
1965	South American Championships	Rio de Janeiro, Brazil	2nd	Long jump	7.24 m
1965	South American Championships	Rio de Janeiro, Brazil	1st	Decathlon	6555 pts
1965	Bolivarian Games	Quito, Ecuador	3rd	4 × 100 m relay	41.6 s
1965	Bolivarian Games	Quito, Ecuador	3rd	Pole vault	4.10 m
1965	Bolivarian Games	Quito, Ecuador	1st	Long jump	7.48 m
1965	Bolivarian Games	Quito, Ecuador	2nd	Shot put	14.12 m
1965	Bolivarian Games	Quito, Ecuador	2nd	Discus throw	42.57 m
1965	Bolivarian Games	Quito, Ecuador	3rd	Javelin throw	60.56 m
1965	Bolivarian Games	Quito, Ecuador	1st	Pentathlon	3376 pts
1966	Central American and Caribbean Games	San Juan, Puerto Rico	6th	Pole vault	3.85 m
1966	Central American and Caribbean Games	San Juan, Puerto Rico	5th	Long jump	7.31 m
1966	Central American and Caribbean Games	San Juan, Puerto Rico	11th	Javelin throw	56.90 m
1967	Pan American Games	Winnipeg, Canada	2nd	Decathlon	7312 pts
1969	South American Championships	Quito, Ecuador	9th (h)	100 m	10.8 s
1969	South American Championships	Quito, Ecuador	1st	Decathlon	6720 pts
1970	Central American and Caribbean Games	Panama City, Panama	3rd	Decathlon	6918 pts
1970	Bolivarian Games	Maracaibo, Venezuela	1st	Pole vault	4.15 m
1970	Bolivarian Games	Maracaibo, Venezuela	1st	Shot put	14.91 m
1970	Bolivarian Games	Maracaibo, Venezuela	5th	Discus throw	41.40 m
1970	Bolivarian Games	Maracaibo, Venezuela	5th	Javelin throw	54.22 m
1970	Bolivarian Games	Maracaibo, Venezuela	1st	Decathlon	7091 pts
1971	South American Championships	Lima, Peru	1st	Decathlon	6880 pts
1973	Bolivarian Games	Panama City, Panama	2nd	Pole vault	4.30 m
