= Melanio Asensio =

Spanish sprinter (1936–2021)

Personal information
- Nationality: Spanish
- Born: 18 May 1936 Bimenes, Spain
- Died: 14 January 2021 (aged 84)

Sport
- Sport: Sprinting
- Event: 200 metres

Melanio Asensio Montes (18 May 1936 – 14 January 2021) was a Spanish sprinter. He competed in the men's 200 metres at the 1960 Summer Olympics.
