= Julio Gómez (Spanish runner) =

Spanish middle-distance runner (1931–2023)

Personal information
- Full name: Julio Gómez Almazán
- Nationality: Spanish
- Born: 7 November 1931 Madrid, Spain
- Died: 10 February 2023 (aged 91)
- Height: 171 cm (5 ft 7 in)
- Weight: 67 kg (148 lb)

Sport
- Sport: Middle-distance running
- Event: 800 metres
Medal record
Men's Athletics
Representing Spain
Ibero-American Games
Bronze medal – third place	1960 Santiago	1500 m

Julio Gómez Almazán (Note: In this Spanish name, the first or paternal surname is Gómez and the second or maternal family name is Almazán.) (7 November 1931 – 10 February 2023) was a Spanish middle-distance runner. He competed in the men's 800 metres at the 1960 Summer Olympics. Gómez died on 10 February 2023, at the age of 91.
