= Rafael Romero =

Venezuelan sprinter (1938–2021)

Personal information
- Full name: Rafael Romero Sandrea
- Born: 22 May 1938 Maracaibo, Zulia, Venezuela
- Died: 15 August 2021 (aged 83)
- Height: 1.78 m (5 ft 10 in)
- Weight: 72 m
Medal record
Men's Athletics
Representing Venezuela
Pan American Games
Gold medal – first place	1963 São Paulo	200 metres
Silver medal – second place	1963 São Paulo	4x100m relay
Central American and Caribbean Games
Gold medal – first place	1962 Kingston	200 metres
Silver medal – second place	1962 Kingston	100 metres
Bolivarian Games
Gold medal – first place	1961 Barranquilla	200 metres
Silver medal – second place	1961 Barranquilla	100 metres
Ibero-American Games
Gold medal – first place	1960 Santiago	100 metres
Gold medal – first place	1960 Santiago	200 metres
Gold medal – first place	1960 Santiago	4x100m relay

Rafael Romero Sandrea (22 May 1938 – 15 August 2021) was a Venezuelan track and field athlete, who competed in the sprint events. He represented his native country in three consecutive Summer Olympics, starting in 1956. Romero won two medals (gold and silver) at the 1963 Pan American Games in Brazil.

== International competitions ==
Year	Competition	Venue	Position	Event	Notes
Representing Venezuela
1956	Olympic Games	Melbourne, Australia	31st (h)	100 m	11.14
1956	Olympic Games	Melbourne, Australia	16th (h)	200 m	21.87
1956	Olympic Games	Melbourne, Australia	13th (h)	4 × 100 m relay	42.0
1959	Central American and Caribbean Games	Caracas, Venezuela	4th	100 m	10.9
1959	Central American and Caribbean Games	Caracas, Venezuela	2nd	200 m	21.92
1959	Central American and Caribbean Games	Caracas, Venezuela	1st	4 × 100 m relay	42.14
1959	Pan American Games	Chicago, United States	6th	100 m	10.6
1959	Pan American Games	Chicago, United States	6th (sf)	200 m	21.5
1959	Pan American Games	Chicago, United States	2nd	4 × 100 m relay	41.1
1960	Olympic Games	Rome, Italy	27th (qf)	100 m	11.1
1960	Olympic Games	Rome, Italy	18th (qf)	200 m	21.4
1960	Olympic Games	Rome, Italy	5th	4 × 100 m relay	40.83
1960	Ibero-American Games	Santiago, Chile	1st	100 m	10.3
1960	Ibero-American Games	Santiago, Chile	1st	200 m	20.8
1960	Ibero-American Games	Santiago, Chile	1st	4 × 100 m relay	40.3
1961	South American Championships	Lima, Peru	4th	100 m	10.9
1961	South American Championships	Lima, Peru	6th	200 m	22.8
1961	South American Championships	Lima, Peru	1st	4 x 100 m relay	41.0
1961	South American Championships	Lima, Peru	1st	4 x 400 m relay	3:16.0
1961	Bolivarian Games	Barranquilla, Colombia	2nd	100 m	10.6
1961	Bolivarian Games	Barranquilla, Colombia	1st	200 m	21.4
1961	Bolivarian Games	Barranquilla, Colombia	1st	4 x 100 m relay	42.0
1962	Central American and Caribbean Games	Kingston, Jamaica	2nd	100 m	10.47
1962	Central American and Caribbean Games	Kingston, Jamaica	1st	200 m	21.0
1962	Central American and Caribbean Games	Kingston, Jamaica	1st	4 × 100 m relay	40.0
1962	Ibero-American Games	Madrid, Spain	1st	100 m	10.6
1962	Ibero-American Games	Madrid, Spain	1st	200 m	21.1
1962	Ibero-American Games	Madrid, Spain	2nd	4 × 100 m relay	41.6
1963	Pan American Games	São Paulo, Brazil	1st	200 m	21.23
1963	Pan American Games	São Paulo, Brazil	2nd	4 × 100 m relay	40.71
1964	Olympic Games	Tokyo, Japan	6th	4 × 100 m relay	39.5
1965	South American Championships	Rio de Janeiro, Brazil	2nd	4 x 100 m relay	41.3
1966	Central American and Caribbean Games	San Juan, Puerto Rico	4th (h)	100 m	NT

== Personal bests ==
- 100 metres – 10.2h (1961)
- 200 metres – 20.8h (1960)
