= Joaquim Ferreira (runner) =

Portuguese middle-distance runner

Personal information
- Full name: Joaquim da Silva Ferreira
- Nationality: Portuguese
- Born: 15 April 1937 (age 88)

Sport
- Sport: Middle-distance running
- Event: Steeplechase

Joaquim da Silva Ferreira (born 15 April 1937) is a Portuguese middle-distance runner. He competed in the men's 3000 metres steeplechase at the 1960 Summer Olympics.

Ferreira won multiple national medals for Sporting CP, and continued to compete until the 1990s. He later developed a relationship with the International Council of Museums, where he donated objects from his private collection that are on display.
