= Valerie Jerome =

Canadian sprinter

Personal information
- Born: 28 April 1944 (age 82) Saint Boniface, Winnipeg, Manitoba, Canada

Sport
- Sport: Sprinting
- Event: 100 metres
Medal record
Women's athletics
Representing Canada
Pan American Games
Bronze medal – third place	1959 Chicago	4×100 metres relay

Valerie Jerome (born 28 April 1944) is an African-Canadian retired Track and Field sprinter, educator, and political activist. She competed in the women's 100 metres at the 1960 Summer Olympics. She finished third in the 1959 Pan American Games 4 × 100 metres relay. Jerome also finished seventh in the 1959 Pan American Games long jump. Jerome is the only Canadian athlete to compete in five track and field events in the Olympics, Commonwealth Games, or Pan-American Games. She is the sister of Harry Jerome and the granddaughter of John "Army" Howard.

== Personal life ==
Jerome was born in Saint Boniface, Winnipeg on 28 April 1944. She was the third born to her parents Harry Vincent Jerome, a porter for Canadian National Railways, and Elsie Jerome. She is the sister of famous Canadian sprinter Harry Jerome, as well as Carolyn Jerome and Barton Jerome. Her grandfather, Canadian Olympian John Howard, represented Canada at the 1912 Stockholm Olympics. Howard was the first Black Canadian to run the 100 and 200m events at the Olympic Games.

After Winnipeg's 1950 Red River Flood, the family moved to North Vancouver. The transition to the west coast was challenging for the family, where they encountered racism. There was a petition to keep the family from moving into their house across the road from Ridgeway Elementary. The petition ultimately failed. In September 1951, to protest the addition of black students at Ridgeway Elementary, a large gathering of community members intercepted the Jerome siblings on their way to the first day of school. They pelted the siblings with hundreds of rocks. It was not until her father returned from a business trip and went to the school to advocate for his children's right to education that the siblings could attend the elementary.

In 1954 the family moved to East 17th street closer to their next school, Sutherland Junior Secondary. Here, the family also experienced racism.

== Athletic career ==
=== Track and field ===
==== 1959 Canadian National Championship ====
Jerome shot to fame at the young age of fifteen after her record-breaking performance in the 1959 Canadian Championships. Jerome, the only black female on the track, dashed into gold in the 60-metre, 80-metre, and 4x100-metre relay events. She also leapt furthest in long jump and third highest in high jump.

==== 1959 Pan-American Games ====
Jerome competed in the 1959 Pan-American games in Chicago, USA. Where she took home bronze in the 4 × 100 m relay with her teammates Sally McCallum, Maureen Rever, and Heather Campbell. Additionally, she came seventh in the long jump.

==== 1960 Summer Olympics ====
Jerome represented Canada in the 1960 Summer Olympics in Rome, Italy, alongside her brother, Harry. She competed in the 4 × 100 m relay and the 100m dash.

=== Athletics official ===
After her retirement from track and field she continued to give back to the athletic community. She worked for 35 years as a track and field official including as chief judge of long jump and triple jump at the 1976 Montreal Olympics. Additionally, she officiated at the Olympics, World Championships, and Commonwealth Games.

=== Olympic torchbearer ===
Jerome was a torchbearer for the 2010 Winter Olympics.

== Post-athletic career ==
=== Educator ===
Jerome graduated from University of British Columbia in 1976 with a Bachelor of Education. After attending UBC she worked as an educator for 35 years and spearheaded a successful campaign to establish a chair in Black Canadian studies at Dalhousie University.

=== Jerome Outreach Society ===
Jerome helped found the Jerome Outreach Society. The Jerome Outreach Society, works to hire various coaches, ranging from professional level to university varsity, and senior high school athletes, to coach at Vancouver area low income schools. At no cost to the schools or the athletes, the Outreach Society hires for a variety of sports including: basketball, track and field, soccer, cross country running, and ultimate frisbee. Since 2007, over 2000 kids have participated, many from low-income backgrounds.

Jerome also helps facilitate an athletic club for inner-city children named in honour of her brother, as well as the Harry Jerome International Track Classic.

=== Political career ===
Jerome championed environmental issues such green spaces and sustainability. Between the years 1985 and 2000, Jerome ran in seven elections for the Green Party, at federal, provincial, and municipal levels. Her son Stuart Parker led the Green Party of British Columbia from 1993 to 2000.

=== Community work ===
Jerome volunteered with the Vancouver Writers Festival for 15 years, has worked with the BC Cancer Agency on fundraising, and currently serves on the board of directors of the Vancouver Junior Professional Division Society.
