= 1961 South American Championships in Athletics =

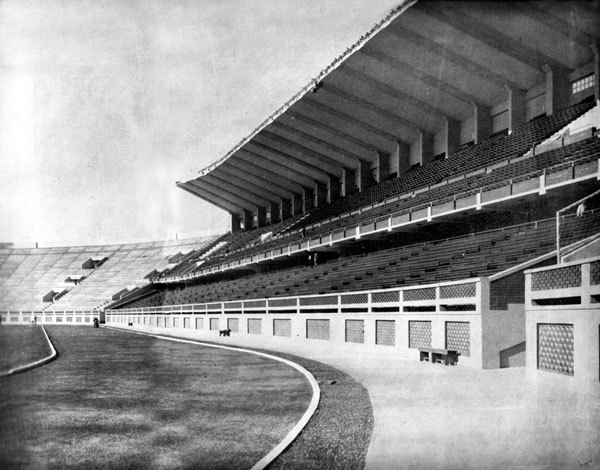
- Host stadium in Lima
- Dates: 20–28 May
- Host city: Lima, Peru
- Venue: Estadio Nacional

The 1961 South American Championships in Athletics were held at the Estadio Nacional in Lima, Peru, between 20 and 28 May.

== Medal summary ==
=== Men's events ===
Event	Gold		Silver		Bronze	
100 metres	Arquímedes Herrera; Venezuela	10.6	Horacio Esteves; Venezuela	10.6	José Telles da Conceição; Brazil	10.7
200 metres	Horacio Esteves; Venezuela	21.3	Arquímedes Herrera; Venezuela	21.6	Luis Vienna; Argentina	21.8
400 metres	Anubes da Silva; Brazil	48.8	Juan Carlos Dyrzka; Argentina	49.3	Eulogio Gomes; Peru	50.0
800 metres	Ramón Sandoval; Chile	1:51.2	José Neira; Colombia	1:52.6	Eduardo Balducci; Argentina	1:53.3
1500 metres	Ramón Sandoval; Chile	3:51.2	Osvaldo Suárez; Argentina	3:53.5	Eduardo Balducci; Argentina	3:54.6
5000 metres	Osvaldo Suárez; Argentina	14:54.7	Luis Sandobal; Argentina	14:55.5	Alberto Ríos; Argentina	15:02.6
10,000 metres	Osvaldo Suárez; Argentina	30:18.1	Luis Sandobal; Argentina	31:13.9	Luis Campusano; Chile	31:27.3
Marathon	Juan Silva; Chile	2:39:36 CR	Ricardo Vidal; Chile	2:41:16	Armando Pino; Argentina	2:42:21
110 metres hurdles	Carlos Mossa; Brazil	14.5 =CR	José Telles da Conceição; Brazil	14.7	Teófilo Davis Bell; Venezuela	15.0
400 metres hurdles	Juan Carlos Dyrzka; Argentina	52.3	Anubes da Silva; Brazil	52.8	Ulisses dos Santos; Brazil	54.0
3000 metres steeplechase	Sebastião Mendes; Brazil	9:14.8	Domingo Amaisón; Argentina	9:20.6	Alberto Ríos; Argentina	9:23.4
4 × 100 metres relay	Venezuela; Clive Bonas; Arquímedes Herrera; Horacio Esteves; Rafael Romero	41.0	Brazil; Joel Costa; Jorge de Barros; Affonso da Silva; José da Conceição	41.5	Argentina; Guillermo Bahler; Juan Stocker; Roberto Ferrairo; Luis Vienna	42.2
4 × 400 metres relay	Venezuela; Emilio Romero; Rafael Romero; Horacio Esteves; Hortensio Fucil	3:16.0	Argentina; Raúl Zabala; Luis Vienna; Juan Stocker; Juan Carlos Dyrzka	3:16.9	Brazil; Cris Ferreira; Ulisses dos Santos; Peter Ostemeier; Anubes da Silva	3:18.1
High jump	Eugenio Velasco; Chile	1.95	Eleuterio Fassi; Argentina	1.95	Horacio Martínez; Argentina	1.95
Pole vault	Marcelo de Souza; Brazil	3.90	Tomatsu Nishida; Brazil	3.90	Brígido Iriarte; Venezuela	3.80
Long jump	Juan Muñoz; Venezuela	7.13	Newton de Castro; Brazil	7.06	Fermín Donazar; Uruguay	6.92
Triple jump	Asnoldo Devonish; Venezuela	14.68	Sylvio Moreira; Brazil	14.52	Reinaldo de Oliveira; Brazil	14.42
Shot put	Enrique Helf; Argentina	15.86 CR	Luis Di Cursi; Argentina	15.69	Héctor Thomas; Venezuela	14.58
Discus throw	Günther Kruse; Argentina	48.57	Enrique Helf; Argentina	46.98	Héctor Menacho; Peru	46.97
Hammer throw	Daniel Cereali; Venezuela	52.55	Roberto Chapchap; Brazil	50.81	Carlos Marzo; Argentina	50.50
Javelin throw	Ricardo Héber; Argentina	64.25	Orlando Garrido; Brazil	63.56	Luis Zárate; Peru	61.40
Decathlon	Bernabé Souza; Brazil	5662	Tito Bracho; Venezuela	5587	Cleomenes da Cunha; Brazil	5502

=== Women's events ===
Event	Gold		Silver		Bronze	
100 metres	Edith Berg; Argentina	12.4	Nancy Correa; Chile	12.4	Marisol Massot; Chile	12.5
200 metres	Edith Berg; Argentina	25.7	Ada Brener; Argentina	25.8	Marta Buongiorno; Argentina	26.0
80 metres hurdles	Wanda dos Santos; Brazil	11.5	Maria José de Lima; Brazil	11.9	Maria Teixeira; Brazil	12.0
4 × 100 metres relay	Brazil; Wanda dos Santos; Maria Caldeira; Laurette Godoy; Érica da Silva	48.9	Argentina; Alicia Kaufmanas; Marta Buongiorno; Ada Brener; Edith Berg	48.9	Chile; Aurora Bianchi; Marisol Massot; Doris Peter; Nancy Correa	49.2
High jump	Aída dos Santos; Brazil	1.60 =CR	Nelly Gómez; Chile	1.55	Maria José de Lima; Brazil	1.50
Long jump	Wanda dos Santos; Brazil	5.38	Ada Brener; Argentina	5.32	Alicia Kaufmanas; Argentina	5.21
Shot put	Ingeborg Pfüller; Argentina	12.41	Vera Trezoitko; Brazil	12.16	Pradelia Delgado; Chile	11.81
Discus throw	Ingeborg Pfüller; Argentina	41.92	Pradelia Delgado; Chile	39.78	Sumiko Yamakawa; Brazil	38.89
Javelin throw	Marlene Ahrens; Chile	42.85	Mercedes García; Venezuela	37.45	Vera Trezoitko; Brazil	37.29

== Medal table ==
Rank	Nation	Gold	Silver	Bronze	Total
1	Argentina (ARG)	10	12	11	33
2	Brazil (BRA)	9	10	9	28
3	Venezuela (VEN)	7	4	3	14
4	Chile (CHI)	5	4	4	13
5	Colombia (COL)	0	1	0	1
6	Peru (PER)	0	0	3	3
7	Uruguay (URU)	0	0	1	1
Totals (7 entries)		31	31	31	93
