= Athletics at the 1962 Central American and Caribbean Games =

Athletics at the IX CAC Games
- Dates: 18–25 August 1962
- Host city: Kingston, Jamaica
- Venue: National Stadium
- Events: 29
- Participation: 15 nations

The athletics competition in the 1962 Central American and Caribbean Games was held between 18 and 25 August at the National Stadium in Kingston, Jamaica.

Women's long jump was contested for the first time at the Games.

== Medal summary ==
=== Men's events ===
Event	Gold		Silver		Bronze	
100 metres	Tom Robinson; Bahamas	10.41	Rafael Romero; Venezuela	10.47	Arquímedes Herrera; Venezuela	10.49
200 metres	Rafael Romero; Venezuela	21.0	Arquímedes Herrera; Venezuela	21.3	Edwin Roberts; Trinidad and Tobago	21.4
400 metres	George Kerr; Jamaica	45.9 GR	Hortensio Fucil; Venezuela	47.3	Malcolm Spence; Jamaica	47.4
800 metres	George Kerr; Jamaica	1:51.0 GR	Melville Spence; Jamaica	1:53.0	José Neira; Colombia	1:54.8
1500 metres	Álvaro Mejía; Colombia	3:51.4 GR	Ralph Gomes; British Guiana	3:52.5	José Neira; Colombia	3:52.6
5000 metres	Eligio Galicia; Mexico	14:46.6 GR	Marciano Castillo; Mexico	15:06.2	Felipe Prado; Mexico	15:11.0
10,000 metres	Eligio Galicia; Mexico	30:55.2 GR	Asencio Escalona; Mexico	31:40.8	Marciano Castillo; Mexico	31:44.4
Half marathon	Hernán Barreneche; Colombia	1:11:49	Fidel Negrete; Mexico	1:12:27	Víctor Peralta; Mexico	1:13:21
110 metres hurdles	Lázaro Betancourt; Cuba	14.2 GR	Heriberto Cruz; Puerto Rico	14.5	Lancelot Bobb; Venezuela	14.7
400 metres hurdles	Víctor Maldonado; Venezuela	51.6 GR	Juan Montes; Puerto Rico	53.0	Jorge Cumberbatch; Cuba	53.2
3000 metre steeplechase	Erasmo Prado; Mexico	9:19.8 GR	Elías Mendoza; Mexico	9:23.6	Pedro Mariani; Puerto Rico	9:31.4
4 × 100 metres relay	Venezuela; Arquímides Herrera; Lloyd Murad; Rafael Romero; Horacio Esteves	40.0 GR	Trinidad and Tobago; Cipriani Phillips; Vincent Ackoon; Wilton Jackson; Edwin Roberts	40.7	Jamaica; Pablo McNeil; Patrick Robinson; Lindley Headley; Dennis Johnson	40.8
4 × 400 metres relay	Jamaica; Melville Spence; Malcolm Spence; Gilwyn Williams; George Kerr	3:11.6 GR	Trinidad and Tobago; Roderick Manswell; Juan Betancourt; Wilton Jackson; Edwin Roberts	3:12.5	Puerto Rico; Germán Guenard; José Luis Villalongo; Gilberto Faberlle; Ovidio de Jesús	3:15.8
High jump	Teodoro Palacios; Guatemala	2.00 GR	Anton Norris; Barbados	1.98	Ernle Haisley; Jamaica	1.94
Pole vault	Rolando Cruz; Puerto Rico	4.72 GR	Rubén Cruz; Puerto Rico	4.26	César Quintero; Colombia	3.81
Long jump	Juan Muñoz; Venezuela	7.68 GR	Wellesley Clayton; Jamaica	7.60	Abelardo Pacheco; Cuba	7.16
Triple jump	Mahoney Samuels; Jamaica	15.52 GR	Ramón López; Cuba	15.33	Perry Christie; Bahamas	14.98
Shot put	Lambertus Rebel; Netherlands Antilles	14.64 GR	Héctor Thomas; Venezuela	14.46	Ramón Rosario; Puerto Rico	13.96
Discus throw	Dagoberto González; Colombia	48.66	Lambertus Rebel; Netherlands Antilles	47.44	Daniel Cereali; Venezuela	46.97
Hammer throw	Enrique Samuells; Cuba	54.15 GR	Daniel Cereali; Venezuela	52.85	Marcelino Borrero; Colombia	50.35
Javelin throw	Jesús Rodríguez; Venezuela	66.66	Wilfredo Salgado; Puerto Rico	64.24	Arnoldo Pallarés; Cuba	61.83
Pentathlon	Héctor Thomas; Venezuela	3212	Roberto Caravaca; Venezuela	2946	Jorge García; Puerto Rico	2912

=== Women's events ===
Event	Gold		Silver		Bronze	
100 metres	Miguelina Cobián; Cuba	12.08	Marcela Daniel; Panama	12.12	Sybil Donmartin; Trinidad and Tobago	12.20
80m hurdles	Bertha Díaz; Cuba	11.1	Lorraine Dunn; Panama	11.7	Carmen Smith; Jamaica	11.8
4 × 100 metres relay	Jamaica; Dorothy Yates; Carmen Williams; Carmen Smith; Ouida Walker	47.0 GR	Cuba; Berta Díaz; Nereida Borges; Miguelina Cobián; Fulgencia Romay	47.3	Panama; Lorraine Dunn; Marcela Daniel; Delceita Oakley; Dinor Batista	47.7
High jump	Brenda Archer; British Guiana	1.53 GR	Marta Font; Cuba	1.51	Beverley Welsh; Jamaica	1.51
Long jump	Bertha Díaz; Cuba	5.50 GR	Dorothy Yates; Jamaica	5.38	Gisela Vidal; Venezuela	5.35
Discus throw	Caridad Agüero; Cuba	43.75 GR	Alejandrina Herrera; Cuba	38.70	Ivonne Rojano; Mexico	38.69
Javelin throw	Hilda Ramírez; Cuba	40.32 GR	Beverly Eloisa Oglivie; Panama	40.19	Berta Chiú; Mexico	35.63

== Medal table ==
Rank	Nation	Gold	Silver	Bronze	Total
1	Cuba (CUB)	7	4	3	14
2	Venezuela (VEN)	6	6	4	16
3	Jamaica (JAM)	5	3	5	13
4	Mexico (MEX)	3	4	5	12
5	Colombia (COL)	3	0	4	7
6	Puerto Rico (PUR)	1	4	4	9
7	British Guiana (BGU)	1	1	0	2
7	Netherlands Antilles (AHO)	1	1	0	2
9	Bahamas (BAH)	1	0	1	2
10	Guatemala (GUA)	1	0	0	1
11	Panama (PAN)	0	3	1	4
12	Trinidad and Tobago (TTO)	0	2	2	4
13	Barbados (BAR)	0	1	0	1
Totals (13 entries)		29	29	29	87
