= 1960 Ibero-American Games =

I Ibero-American Games
- Dates: October 11–16, 1960
- Host city: Santiago, Chile
- Venue: Estadio Nacional
- Level: Senior
- Events: 31 (22 men, 9 women)
- Participation: 275 athletes from 15 nations

The 1960 Ibero-American Games (Spanish: I Juegos Iberoamericanos) were held at the Estadio Nacional in Santiago, Chile, between October 11–16, 1960.

A total of 31 events were contested, 22 by men and 9 by women.

== Medal summary ==
Medal winners were published.

=== Men ===
Event	Gold		Silver		Bronze	
100 metres	Rafael Romero (VEN)	10.3	Horacio Esteves (VEN)	10.3	Luis Vienna (ARG)	10.4
200 metres	Rafael Romero (VEN)	20.8	José Telles da Conceição (BRA)	21.5	Lloyd Murad (VEN)	21.5
400 metres	Humberto Brown (PAN)	47.4	Germán Guenard (PUR)	47.9	Anubes da Silva (BRA)	48.5
800 metres	Ramón Sandoval (CHI)	1:50.4	Tomás Barris (ESP)	1:51.0	Julio León (CHI)	1:51.9
1500 metres	Ramón Sandoval (CHI)	3:52.4	Tomás Barris (ESP)	3:52.6	Julio Gómez (ESP)	3:56.0
5000 metres	Osvaldo Suárez (ARG)	14:29.0	José Molíns (ESP)	14:33.6	Manuel Oliveira (POR)	14:56.4
10,000 metres	Osvaldo Suárez (ARG)	30:26.0	José Molíns (ESP)	30:31.6	Carlos Pérez (ESP)	31:02.4
Marathon	Osvaldo Suárez (ARG)	2:38:23	Gumersindo Gómez (ARG)	2:38:33	Álvaro Conde (POR)	2:43:20
110 metres hurdles	Lázaro Betancourt (CUB)	14.3	José Telles da Conceição (BRA)	14.3	Carlos Mossa (BRA)	14.4
400 metres hurdles	Juan Carlos Dyrzka (ARG)	52.8	Anubes da Silva (BRA)	53.0	Ovidio de Jesús (PUR)	53.7
3000 metres steeplechase	Sebastião Mendes (BRA)	9:01.8	Manuel Augusto Alonso (ESP)	9:04.8	José Jesús Fernández (ESP)	9:07.4
4 × 100 metres relay	Venezuela; Lloyd Murad; Rafael Romero; Emilio Romero; Horacio Esteves	40.3	Brazil; Affonso Coelho da Silva; João Pires Sobrinho; Joe Satow; José Telles da Conceição	40.6	Panama; Humberto Brown; Luis Carter; Sydney Dobbs; Percival Jespech	41.3
4 × 400 metres relay	Puerto Rico; Juan Montes; José Luis Villalongo; Ovidio de Jesús; Germán Guenard	3:12.8	Brazil; Joel Rocha; Anubes da Silva; Paulo de Oliveira; Ulisses dos Santos	3:15.2	Spain; Virgilio González Barbeitos; Jesús Rancaño; José Luis Martínez; Amigo	3:15.6
High jump	Teodoro Palacios (GUA)	1.95	Eugenio Velasco (CHI)	1.90	Eleuterio Fassi (ARG)	1.90
Pole vault	Rolando Cruz (PUR)	4.35	Fernando Adarraga (ESP)	4.20	Luis Meza (CHI)	4.15
Long jump	Pedro de Almeida (POR)	7.32	Roberto Procel (MEX)	7.16	Adhemar da Silva (BRA)	7.07
Triple jump	Adhemar da Silva (BRA)	15.83	Ramón López (CUB)	15.06	Jorge Castillo (ARG)	15.00
Shot put	Enrique Helf (ARG)	16.09	Cosme Di Cursi (ARG)	15.88	Alfonso Vidal-Quadras (ESP)	14.72
Discus throw	Günther Kruse (ARG)	48.56	Dieter Gevert (CHI)	47.98	Hernán Haddad (CHI)	47.88
Hammer throw	José María Elorriaga (ESP)	52.99	Alejandro Díaz (CHI)	52.16	Roberto Chapchap (BRA)	52.15
Javelin throw	Emilio Navarro (PUR)	67.38	José Culleré (ESP)	67.23	Alfonso de Andrés (ESP)	64.62
Decathlon	Héctor Thomas (VEN)	6928	Emir Martínez (ARG)	6633	Juris Laipenieks (CHI)	6532

=== Women ===
Event	Gold		Silver		Bronze	
100 metres	Carlota Gooden (PAN)	11.9	Edith Berg (ARG)	12.3	Marisol Massot (CHI)	12.4
200 metres	Jean Holmes (PAN)	24.8	Lorraine Dunn (PAN)	25.7	Marta Buongiorno (ARG)	26.0
80 metres hurdles	Wanda dos Santos (BRA)	11.5	Maria José de Lima (BRA)	11.9	Eliana Gaete (CHI)	12.0
4 × 100 metres relay	Panama; Silvia Hunte; Carlota Gooden; Lorraine Dunn; Jean Holmes	47.2	Argentina; Margarita Formeiro; Marta Buongiorno; Ada Brener; Edith Berg	48.9	Chile; Eliana Gaete; Aurora Bianchi; Marisol Massot; Nancy Correa	49.2
High jump	Nelly Gómez (CHI)	1.55	Maria José de Lima (BRA)	1.50	Deonildes Martins (URU)	1.45
Long jump	Ada Brener (ARG)	5.55	Laura das Chagas (BRA)	5.43	Eliette Zenardo (BRA)	5.30
Shot put	Pradelia Delgado (CHI)	12.17	Ingeborg Pfüller (ARG)	11.52	Maria Caldeira (BRA)	11.03
Discus throw	Ingeborg Mello (ARG)	39.34	Pradelia Delgado (CHI)	39.15	Ingeborg Pfüller (ARG)	38.85
Javelin throw	Maria Ventura (BRA)	40.72	Adriana Silva (CHI)	40.22	Sumiko Yamakawa (BRA)	29.22

== Medal table (unofficial) ==
Medal tables for both male and female competitions were published.

* Host nation (Chile)

Rank	Nation	Gold	Silver	Bronze	Total
1	Argentina (ARG)	8	6	5	19
2	Brazil (BRA)	4	8	7	19
3	Chile (CHI)*	4	5	7	16
4	Panama (PAN)	4	1	1	6
4	Venezuela (VEN)	4	1	1	6
6	Puerto Rico (PUR)	3	1	1	5
7	Spain (ESP)	1	7	6	14
8	Cuba (CUB)	1	1	0	2
9	Portugal (POR)	1	0	2	3
10	Guatemala (GUA)	1	0	0	1
11	Mexico (MEX)	0	1	0	1
12	Uruguay (URU)	0	0	1	1
Totals (12 entries)		31	31	31	93

== Team trophies ==
The placing table for team trophy awarded to the 1st place overall team (men and women) was published. Overall winner and winner at the men's competition was Argentina. Brazil won the title in the women's category.

=== Overall ===
The host country is highlighted in lavender blue

Rank	Nation	Points
1st place, gold medalist(s)	Argentina	173
2	Brazil	167
3	Chile	154
4	Spain	109
5	Venezuela	90
6	Puerto Rico	59
7	Panama	56
8	Portugal	33
9	Cuba	23
10	Mexico	18
11	Guatemala	10
12	Uruguay	5
13	Peru	3

== Participation ==
A total number of 275 athletes from 15 countries participated in the event.

- Argentina (32)
- Brazil (34)
- Chile (44)
- Colombia (3)
- Cuba (10)
- Ecuador (7)
- Guatemala (3)
- Mexico (17)
- Panama (8)
- Paraguay (5)
- Peru (8)
- Portugal (18)
- Puerto Rico (20)
- Spain (30)
- Uruguay (12)
- Venezuela (24)
