= Athletics at the 1967 Summer Universiade – Men's 4 × 100 metres relay =

The men's 4 × 100 metres relay event at the 1967 Summer Universiade was held at the National Olympic Stadium in Tokyo on 31 August and 4 September 1967.

== Results ==
=== Heats ===
Rank	Heat	Nation	Athletes	Time	Notes
1	1	United States	Ron Whtiney, Bob Seagren, Ron Copeland, Tommie Smith	40.7	Q
2	1	West Germany	Bernd Barlage, Gert Metz, Hans-Jürgen Felsen, Martin Jellinghaus	41.0	Q
3	1	Australia	Phil King, Mick McGrath, Graham Taylor, Greg Lewis	41.0	Q
4	1	Brazil	Carlos Mossa, Paulo Bergamasco, Jurandir Ienne, Admilson Chitarra	42.0	Q
	1	Indonesia	Awang Papilaya, Bambang Wahjudi, Agus Sugiri, Supardi Soepardi	DQ	
1	2	Italy	Vittorio Roscio, Ennio Preatoni, Ippolito Giani, Livio Berruti	40.3	Q
2	2	Great Britain	Bob Frith, Menzies Campbell, Mike Hauck, Jim Barry	40.3	Q
3	2	France	Alain Vermuse, Pierre Burrelier, Christian Nicolau, Patrick Bourbeillon	40.8	Q
4	2	Japan	Naoki Abe, Junji Ishikawa, Yoshiyuki Moriya, Shinji Ogura	40.8	Q

=== Final ===
Rank	Nation	Athletes	Time	Notes
1st place, gold medalist(s)	Italy	Vittorio Roscio, Ennio Preatoni, Ippolito Giani, Livio Berruti	39.8	
2nd place, silver medalist(s)	Japan	Naoki Abe, Junji Ishikawa, Yosiyuki Moriya, Shinji Ogura	40.2	
3rd place, bronze medalist(s)	Great Britain	Bob Frith, Menzies Campbell, Mike Hauck, Jim Barry	40.3	
4	West Germany	Hans-Jürgen Felsen, Martin Jellinghaus, Bernd-Josef Barlage, Gert Metz	40.4	
5	United States	Charles Craig, Bob Seagren, Ron Copeland, Tommie Smith	40.7	
6	France	Alain Vermuse, Pierre Burrelier, Christian Nicolau, Patrick Bourbeillon	40.8	
7	Brazil	Jurandir Ienne, Paulo Bergamaco, Admilson Chitarra, Carlos Mossa	42.0	
8	Australia	Phil King, Mick McGrath, Graham Taylor, Greg Lewis	42.1	
