= 1965 South American Championships in Athletics – Results =

These are the partial results of the 1965 South American Championships in Athletics which took place at the Estádio Célio de Barros in Rio de Janeiro, Brazil, between 7 and 15 October. Only the results of the first six athletes in each final were reported.

== Men's results ==
=== 100 metres ===
Heats – 8 May

Rank	Heat	Name	Nationality	Time	Notes
1	1	Arquímedes Herrera	Venezuela	10.8	Q
2	1	Roberto Schaefer	Argentina	11.0	Q
3	1	Gilberto de Jesus	Brazil	11.0	Q
4	1	Juan Hasegawa	Peru	11.2	
5	1	Tito Diago	Colombia	11.3	
6	1	Leonardo Salvarrey	Uruguay	12.0	
1	2	Iván Moreno	Chile	10.6	Q
2	2	Araken da Costa	Brazil	10.6	Q
3	2	Francisco Gutiérrez	Colombia	11.0	Q
4	2	Carlos Biondi	Argentina	11.0	
5	2	Roberto Alvarado	Peru	11.1	
6	2	Ricardo Young	Uruguay	11.1	
1	3	Manuel Planchart	Venezuela	10.6	Q
2	3	Affonso da Silva	Brazil	10.7	Q
3	3	Julio Veliz	Ecuador	10.9	Q
4	3	Miguel Corvacho	Colombia	11.1	
5	3	Juan Landon	Chile	11.1	
1	4	Carlos Barón	Chile	10.6	Q
2	4	Héctor Thomas	Venezuela	10.6	Q
3	4	Andrés Calonge	Argentina	10.8	Q
4	4	Javier Sanguinetti	Peru	11.3	

Semifinals – 8 May

Rank	Heat	Name	Nationality	Time	Notes
1	1	Iván Moreno	Chile	10.6	Q
2	1	Manuel Planchart	Venezuela	10.6	Q
3	1	Araken da Costa	Brazil	10.7	Q
4	1	Andrés Calonge	Argentina	10.8	
5	1	Francisco Gutiérrez	Colombia	11.0	
5	1	Gilberto de Jesus	Brazil	11.0	
1	2	Carlos Barón	Chile	10.6	Q
2	2	Affonso da Silva	Brazil	10.6	Q
3	2	Héctor Thomas	Venezuela	10.7	Q
4	2	Roberto Schaefer	Argentina	10.7	
5	2	Julio Veliz	Ecuador	11.0	
6	2	Arquímedes Herrera	Venezuela	11.1	

Final – 9 May

Rank	Name	Nationality	Time	Notes
1st place, gold medalist(s)	Iván Moreno	Chile	10.4	
2nd place, silver medalist(s)	Héctor Thomas	Venezuela	10.5	
3rd place, bronze medalist(s)	Manuel Planchart	Venezuela	10.7	
4	Affonso da Silva	Brazil	10.8	
5	Carlos Barón	Chile	10.8	
6	Araken da Costa	Brazil	10.9	

=== 200 metres ===
Heats – 12 May

Rank	Heat	Name	Nationality	Time	Notes
1	1	Víctor Maldonado	Venezuela	22.2	Q
2	1	Carlos Barón	Chile	22.2	Q
3	1	Julio Veliz	Ecuador	22.5	Q
4	1	Anani Santos	Brazil	22.7	
5	1	Guillermo Vallania	Argentina	23.2	
1	2	Andrés Calonge	Argentina	22.0	Q
2	2	Hortensio Fucil	Venezuela	22.0	Q
3	2	Miguel Corvacho	Colombia	22.2	Q
4	2	Ricardo Young	Uruguay	22.6	
5	2	Roberto Quijada	Chile	22.6	
6	2	Augusto Paredes	Peru	23.6	
1	3	Manuel Planchart	Venezuela	22.0	Q
2	3	Francisco Gutiérrez	Colombia	22.1	Q
3	3	Joel Costa	Brazil	22.5	Q
4	3	Víctor Ibáñez	Peru	22.6	
5	3	Juan Carlos Dyrzka	Argentina	23.7	
1	4	Iván Moreno	Chile	22.1	Q
2	4	Pedro Grajales	Colombia	22.2	Q
3	4	Affonso da Silva	Brazil	22.4	Q
4	4	Roberto Alvarado	Peru	22.5	

Semifinals – 12 May

Rank	Heat	Name	Nationality	Time	Notes
1	1	Iván Moreno	Chile	22.0	Q
2	1	Hortensio Fucil	Venezuela	22.0	Q
3	1	Víctor Maldonado	Venezuela	22.1	Q
4	1	Affonso da Silva	Brazil	22.4	
5	1	Julio Veliz	Ecuador	22.8	
6	1	Miguel Corvacho	Colombia	22.9	
1	2	Manuel Planchart	Venezuela	21.8	Q
2	2	Carlos Barón	Chile	21.8	Q
3	2	Pedro Grajales	Colombia	22.0	Q
4	2	Andrés Calonge	Argentina	22.1	
5	2	Francisco Gutiérrez	Colombia	22.4	
6	2	Joel Costa	Brazil	22.6	

Final – 13 May

Rank	Name	Nationality	Time	Notes
1st place, gold medalist(s)	Carlos Barón	Chile	21.6	
2nd place, silver medalist(s)	Hortensio Fucil	Venezuela	21.6	
3rd place, bronze medalist(s)	Iván Moreno	Chile	21.9	
4	Manuel Planchart	Venezuela	22.0	
5	Pedro Grajales	Colombia	22.3	
6	Víctor Maldonado	Venezuela	22.5	

=== 400 metres ===
Heats – 8 May

Rank	Heat	Name	Nationality	Time	Notes
1	1	Víctor Maldonado	Venezuela	48.5	Q
2	1	Waldemar Montezano	Brazil	48.9	Q
3	1	José Cavero	Peru	49.2	
4	1	Carlos Heuchert	Argentina	49.3	
5	1	Juan Santiago Gordón	Chile	50.3	
6	1	Jorge Almeida	Ecuador	52.4	
1	2	Andrés Calonge	Argentina	48.2	Q
2	2	Hortensio Fucil	Venezuela	48.3	Q
3	2	Ernendi Eisele	Brazil	48.7	
4	2	Roberto Quijada	Chile	50.6	
5	2	Jesús Vieite	Colombia	51.0	
6	2	Augusto Paredes	Peru	51.9	
1	3	Pedro Grajales	Colombia	47.7	Q
2	3	José Jacinto Hidalgo	Venezuela	48.7	Q
3	3	Enrique Naranjo	Chile	49.5	
4	3	Joel Rocha	Brazil	49.5	
5	3	Víctor Ibáñez	Peru	50.9	

Final – 9 May

Rank	Name	Nationality	Time	Notes
1st place, gold medalist(s)	Víctor Maldonado	Venezuela	47.5	
2nd place, silver medalist(s)	Pedro Grajales	Colombia	47.5	
3rd place, bronze medalist(s)	Andrés Calonge	Argentina	48.4	
4	Hortensio Fucil	Venezuela	48.5	
5	Waldemar Montezano	Brazil	49.0	
6	José Jacinto Hidalgo	Venezuela	49.1	

=== 800 metres ===
Heats – 12 May

Rank	Heat	Name	Nationality	Time	Notes
1	1	Leslie Mentor	Venezuela	1:55.6	Q
2	1	Jorge Grosser	Chile	1:56.3	Q
3	1	Hugo Burgos	Colombia	1:56.5	Q
4	1	Carlos Heuchert	Argentina	1:56.6	
5	1	Guido Riquelme	Chile	1:59.0	
6	1	Édson dos Santos	Brazil	2:00.1	
1	2	Tarcio de Andrade	Brazil	1:57.8	Q
2	2	José de Azevedo	Brazil	1:58.4	Q
3	2	Luis Alarcón	Chile	1:58.5	Q
4	2	Alejandro Arroyo	Ecuador	1:59.0	
5	2	Víctor Gadea	Uruguay	1:59.4	
6	2	Jesús Vieites	Colombia	2:00.1	
	2	Guillermo Cuello	Argentina	DQ	

Final – 13 May

Rank	Name	Nationality	Time	Notes
1st place, gold medalist(s)	Leslie Mentor	Venezuela	1:54.5	
2nd place, silver medalist(s)	Jorge Grosser	Chile	1:55.1	
3rd place, bronze medalist(s)	José de Azevedo	Brazil	1:55.3	
4	Hugo Burgos	Colombia	1:55.4	
5	Tarcio de Andrade	Brazil	1:56.3	
6	Luis Alarcón	Chile	1:56.7	

=== 1500 metres ===
9 May

Rank	Name	Nationality	Time	Notes
1st place, gold medalist(s)	Tarcio de Andrade	Brazil	3:53.9	NR
2nd place, silver medalist(s)	Albertino Etchechury	Uruguay	3:54.1	
3rd place, bronze medalist(s)	Domingo Amaizón	Argentina	3:54.5	
4	Juan Carlos Ferriolo	Argentina	3:56.5	
5	Jorge Grosser	Chile	3:56.7	
6	Hugo Burgos	Colombia	3:57.4	

=== 5000 metres ===
8 May

Rank	Name	Nationality	Time	Notes
1st place, gold medalist(s)	Domingo Amaizón	Argentina	14:46.5	
2nd place, silver medalist(s)	Mario Cutropia	Argentina	14:49.9	
3rd place, bronze medalist(s)	Ricardo Vidal	Chile	14:53.8	
4	Antônio Azevedo	Brazil	14:57.0	
5	Manuel Cabrera	Colombia	14:58.8	
6	Tarcio de Andrade	Brazil	15:18.4	

=== 10,000 metres ===
13 May

Rank	Name	Nationality	Time	Notes
1st place, gold medalist(s)	Mario Cutropia	Argentina	31:39.1	
2nd place, silver medalist(s)	Domingo Amaizón	Argentina	32:01.0	
3rd place, bronze medalist(s)	Ricardo Vidal	Chile	32:11.0	
4	Manuel Cabrera	Colombia	32:54.2	
5	Benedito do Amaral	Brazil	32:59.4	
6	Antônio Azevedo	Brazil	33:21.3	

=== Marathon ===
16 May

Rank	Name	Nationality	Time	Notes
1st place, gold medalist(s)	Ricardo Vidal	Chile	2:38:15	CR
2nd place, silver medalist(s)	Dorival Silva	Brazil	2:38:23	
3rd place, bronze medalist(s)	Domingo Amaizón	Argentina	2:40:13	
4	Marcelo Terrera	Argentina	2:51:09	
5	Dario Pereira	Brazil	2:55:34	
6	João Batista do Carmo	Brazil	3:36:00	
	Mario Cutropia	Argentina	DNF	

=== 110 metres hurdles ===
Heats – 9 May

Rank	Heat	Name	Nationality	Time	Notes
1	1	Carlos Mossa	Brazil	14.8	Q
2	1	Guillermo Vallania	Argentina	14.9	Q
3	1	Hernando Arrechea	Colombia	15.0	Q
4	1	Noel Davis Bell	Venezuela	15.1	
5	1	Augusto Paranaguá	Brazil	15.5	
6	1	Felipe Montero	Chile	15.5	
1	2	Juan Carlos Dyrzka	Argentina	14.9	Q
2	2	Jurandir Ienne	Brazil	15.0	Q
3	2	José Cavero	Peru	15.4	Q
4	2	César Quintero	Colombia	15.4	
5	2	Elbio García	Uruguay	15.5	
5	2	Jaime Davis Bell	Venezuela	15.6	

Final – 12 May

Rank	Name	Nationality	Time	Notes
1st place, gold medalist(s)	Carlos Mossa	Brazil	15.2	
2nd place, silver medalist(s)	Guillermo Vallania	Argentina	15.3	
3rd place, bronze medalist(s)	Hernando Arrechea	Colombia	15.7	
4	Juan Carlos Dyrzka	Argentina	15.8	
5	José Cavero	Peru	16.1	
6	Jurandir Ienne	Brazil	16.4	

=== 400 metres hurdles ===
Heats – 13 May

Rank	Heat	Name	Nationality	Time	Notes
1	1	Víctor Maldonado	Venezuela	56.2	Q
2	1	Jurandir Ienne	Brazil	56.9	Q
	1	Jorge Almeida	Ecuador	DQ	
1	2	Juan Carlos Dyrzka	Argentina	53.1	Q
2	2	Noel Davis Bell	Venezuela	53.9	Q
3	2	Guaracy da Silva	Brazil	54.8	
4	2	Juan Santiago Gordón	Chile	54.8	
1	3	José Cavero	Peru	53.8	Q
2	3	Arístides Pineda	Venezuela	53.8	Q
3	3	Adjalme de Carvalho	Brazil	55.2	
4	3	Leonardo Salvarrey	Uruguay	55.4	

Final – 15 May

Rank	Name	Nationality	Time	Notes
1st place, gold medalist(s)	Víctor Maldonado	Venezuela	51.5	
2nd place, silver medalist(s)	Juan Carlos Dyrzka	Argentina	52.0	
3rd place, bronze medalist(s)	José Cavero	Peru	52.5	
4	Arístides Pineda	Venezuela	53.6	
5	Noel Davis Bell	Venezuela	54.5	
6	Jurandir Ienne	Brazil	54.8	

=== 3000 metres steeplechase ===
15 May

Rank	Name	Nationality	Time	Notes
1st place, gold medalist(s)	Domingo Amaizón	Argentina	9:03.0	CR
2nd place, silver medalist(s)	Albertino Etchechury	Uruguay	9:07.5	
3rd place, bronze medalist(s)	Sebastião Mendes	Brazil	9:22.2	
4	Juan Carlos Ferriolo	Argentina	9:24.2	
5	Pedro Prado Filho	Brazil	9:27.5	
6	Benedito do Amaral	Brazil	9:42.9	

=== 4 × 100 metres relay ===
15 May

Rank	Nation	Competitors	Time	Notes
1st place, gold medalist(s)	Brazil	Joe Satow, José da Conceição, Affonso da Silva, Araken da Costa	41.2	
2nd place, silver medalist(s)	Venezuela	Arquímedes Herrera, Manuel Planchart, Rafael Romero, Hortensio Fucil	41.3	
3rd place, bronze medalist(s)	Colombia	Miguel Corvacho, Francisco Gutiérrez, Tito Diago, Pedro Grajales	41.6	
4	Peru	Juan Hasegawa, Javier Sanguinetti, Víctor Ibáñez, Roberto Alvarado	43.2	
	Argentina		DQ	
	Chile		DQ	

=== 4 × 400 metres relay ===
16 May

Rank	Nation	Competitors	Time	Notes
1st place, gold medalist(s)	Venezuela	Aristides Pineda, José Jacinto Hidalgo, Hortensio Fusil, Víctor Maldonado	3:14.5	
2nd place, silver medalist(s)	Brazil	Altemerindo Amorim, Joel Rocha, Waldemar Montesano, Ernani Eisele	3:15.9	
3rd place, bronze medalist(s)	Argentina	Carlos Heuchert, Guillermo Vallania, Juan Carlos Dyrzka, Andrés Calonge	3:17.3	
4	Chile	Juan Santiago Gordón, Iván Moreno, Carlos Barón, Enrique Naranjo	3:17.5	
5	Colombia	Jesús Vieites, Hugo Burgos, Francisco Gutiérrez, Pedro Grajales	3:17.8	
6	Uruguay	Víctor Gadea, Elbio García, Ricardo Young, Leonardo Salvarrey	3:21.8	

=== High jump ===
8 May

Rank	Name	Nationality	Result	Notes
1st place, gold medalist(s)	Eleuterio Fassi	Argentina	1.97	
2nd place, silver medalist(s)	Roberto Abugattás	Peru	1.97	
3rd place, bronze medalist(s)	Carlos Colchado	Peru	1.91	
4	Elbio García	Uruguay	1.88	
5	Manoel Cezar	Brazil	1.88	
6	Roberto Pozzi	Argentina	1.88	

=== Pole vault ===
12 May

Rank	Name	Nationality	Result	Notes
1st place, gold medalist(s)	Erico Barney	Argentina	4.25	AR
2nd place, silver medalist(s)	Parmenio Restrepo	Colombia	3.95	
3rd place, bronze medalist(s)	Mauricio de Souza	Brazil	3.90	
4	César Quintero	Colombia	3.80	
5	Hugo Argat	Argentina	3.70	
6	Cleomenes de Cunha	Brazil	3.70	

=== Long jump ===
9 May

Rank	Name	Nationality	Result	Notes
1st place, gold medalist(s)	Iván Moreno	Chile	7.29	
2nd place, silver medalist(s)	Héctor Thomas	Venezuela	7.24	
3rd place, bronze medalist(s)	José da Conceição	Brazil	7.06	
4	Peter Junge	Chile	7.02	
5	Newton de Castro	Brazil	6.98	
6	John Muñoz	Venezuela	6.96	
	Araken da Costa	Brazil	NM	

=== Triple jump ===
13 May

Rank	Name	Nationality	Result	Notes
1st place, gold medalist(s)	Nelson Prudêncio	Brazil	14.96	
2nd place, silver medalist(s)	Mário Gomes	Brazil	14.87	
3rd place, bronze medalist(s)	Juan Ivanovic	Chile	14.53	
4	Hugo Tombolini	Argentina	14.51	
5	Asnoldo Devonish	Venezuela	14.33	
6	Clerys Fuentes	Venezuela	14.28	

=== Shot put ===
12 May

Rank	Name	Nationality	Result	Notes
1st place, gold medalist(s)	José Carlos Jacques	Brazil	15.61	
2nd place, silver medalist(s)	Cosme Di Cursi	Argentina	15.29	
3rd place, bronze medalist(s)	Mario Peretti	Argentina	15.00	
4	Enrique Figueredo	Uruguay	15.00	
5	José Alberto Vallejo	Argentina	14.37	
6	Alvaro Zucchi	Brazil	14.30	

=== Discus throw ===
15 May

Rank	Name	Nationality	Result	Notes
1st place, gold medalist(s)	João Alexandre	Brazil	48.25	
2nd place, silver medalist(s)	Dieter Gevert	Chile	48.15	
3rd place, bronze medalist(s)	Dagoberto González	Colombia	48.04	
4	Ceferino Andara	Venezuela	47.30	
5	Claudio Romanini	Brazil	46.78	
6	Cosme Di Cursi	Argentina	46.02	

=== Hammer throw ===
9 May

Rank	Name	Nationality	Result	Notes
1st place, gold medalist(s)	Roberto Chapchap	Brazil	56.62	CR
2nd place, silver medalist(s)	José Alberto Vallejo	Argentina	54.94	
3rd place, bronze medalist(s)	Marceliano Borrero	Colombia	51.46	
4	Walter Rodrigues	Brazil	49.56	
5	Carlos Marzo	Argentina	49.13	
6	Ceferino Andara	Venezuela	48.21	

=== Javelin throw ===
8 May – Old model

Rank	Name	Nationality	Result	Notes
1st place, gold medalist(s)	Ian Barney	Argentina	66.43	
2nd place, silver medalist(s)	Patricio Etcheverry	Chile	64.45	
3rd place, bronze medalist(s)	Jesús Rodríguez	Venezuela	64.28	
4	Ricardo Heber	Argentina	62.89	
5	Antolín Rodríguez	Argentina	62.27	
6	Alvaro Zucchi	Brazil	61.70	

=== Decathlon ===
15–16 May – 1962 tables (1985 conversions given with *)

The highest mark recorded in each event is highlighted in yellow

Rank	Athlete	Nationality	100m	LJ	SP	HJ	400m	110m H	DT	PV	JT	1500m	Points	Conv.	Notes
1st place, gold medalist(s)	Héctor Thomas	Venezuela	10.7	7.17	13.74	1.75	52.6	17.5	40.14	4.10	56.43	5:24.5	6555	6690*	
2nd place, silver medalist(s)	Roberto Caravaca	Venezuela	11.7	6.75	11.05	1.75	51.8	16.7	32.30	3.80	54.50	4:26.2	6028	6407*	
3rd place, bronze medalist(s)	Renato Renck	Brazil	11.0	6.64	13.17	1.67	52.4	16.5	32.46	3.20	45.72	5:24.5	5486	5959*	
4	Bernabé Souza	Brazil	11.5	6.19	10.61	1.78	52.2	16.8	27.36	3.70	39.94	4:37.8	5360	5876*	
5	Rodolfo Díaz	Uruguay	11.3	6.09	11.55	1.80	51.5	17.0	31.90	3.60	36.58	5:00.3	5333	5858*	
6	Arthur Palma	Brazil	11.7	5.89	12.01	1.75	52.8	16.8	35.50	2.90	39.05	4:58.2	4983	5627*	
7	Néstor Villegas	Colombia	11.3	5.91	13.24	1.75	53.4	20.2	36.92	2.60	45.86	5:05.5	4817	5499*	
8	Peter Junge	Chile	11.7	6.82	11.90	1.65	53.1	19.9	33.54	2.90	41.94	5:10.5	4668	5386*	
9	Guido Riquelme	Chile	11.8	5.92	8.97	1.65	52.0	18.6	27.04	2.90	40.61	4:33.7	4464	5217*	
	Brígido Iriarte	Venezuela	12.2	6.10	11.39	1.50	61.3	21.8	30.94	?	–	–	DNF	–	

== Women's results ==
=== 100 metres ===
Heats – 8 May

Rank	Heat	Name	Nationality	Time	Notes
1	1	Marta Buongiorno	Argentina	12.2	Q
2	1	Leontina dos Santos	Brazil	12.5	Q
3	1	Edir Ribeiro	Brazil	12.7	Q
4	1	Marisol Massot	Chile	12.7	
5	1	Nelly Orellana	Chile	13.0	
6	1	Fabiola Quiñónez	Ecuador	13.0	
1	2	Emilia Dyrzka	Argentina	12.5	Q
2	2	Erica da Silva	Brazil	12.5	Q
3	2	María Cristina Irurzun	Argentina	12.7	Q
4	2	Smirna Paz	Colombia	12.7	
5	2	María Cristina Ducci	Chile	12.8	

Final – 9 May

Rank	Name	Nationality	Time	Notes
1st place, gold medalist(s)	Marta Buongiorno	Argentina	12.2	
2nd place, silver medalist(s)	Erica da Silva	Brazil	12.4	
3rd place, bronze medalist(s)	Emilia Dyrzka	Argentina	12.5	
4	Edir Ribeiro	Brazil	12.6	
5	Leontina dos Santos	Brazil	12.6	
6	María Cristina Irurzun	Argentina	12.7	

=== 200 metres ===
Heats – 12 May

Rank	Heat	Name	Nationality	Time	Notes
1	1	Ada Brener	Argentina	26.1	Q
2	1	Emilia Dyrzka	Argentina	26.1	Q
3	1	Erica da Silva	Brazil	26.2	Q
4	1	Carlota Ulloa	Chile	27.0	
5	1	Fabiola Quiñónez	Ecuador	28.5	
1	2	Marta Buongiorno	Argentina	25.6	Q
2	2	Leontina dos Santos	Brazil	25.7	Q
3	2	María Cristina Ducci	Chile	26.1	Q
4	2	Ignes Pimentel	Brazil	26.3	
5	2	Smirna Paz	Colombia	27.0	
6	2	Marisol Massot	Chile	27.0	

Final – 13 May

Rank	Name	Nationality	Time	Notes
1st place, gold medalist(s)	Marta Buongiorno	Argentina	25.3	
2nd place, silver medalist(s)	Erica da Silva	Brazil	25.6	
3rd place, bronze medalist(s)	Ada Brener	Argentina	25.7	
4	Leontina dos Santos	Brazil	25.7	
5	Emilia Dyrzka	Argentina	25.8	
6	María Cristina Ducci	Chile	26.2	

=== 80 metres hurdles ===
Heats – 15 May

Rank	Heat	Name	Nationality	Time	Notes
1	1	Emilia Dyrzka	Argentina	11.6	Q
2	1	Wanda dos Santos	Brazil	11.6	Q
3	1	Carlota Ulloa	Chile	11.8	Q
4	1	Ada Brener	Argentina	12.4	
1	2	Marisol Massot	Chile	11.9	Q
2	2	Leda Santos	Brazil	12.0	Q
3	2	Ana Udini	Uruguay	12.1	Q
4	2	Maria Isabel Ribeiro	Brazil	12.2	
5	2	Alicia Kaufmanas	Argentina	12.3	

Final – 16 May

Rank	Name	Nationality	Time	Notes
1st place, gold medalist(s)	Emilia Dyrzka	Argentina	11.6	
2nd place, silver medalist(s)	Carlota Ulloa	Chile	12.0	
3rd place, bronze medalist(s)	Marisol Massot	Chile	12.1	
4	Leda Santos	Brazil	12.2	
5	Ana Udini	Uruguay	12.3	
	Wanda dos Santos	Brazil	DQ	

=== 4 × 100 metres relay ===
16 May

Rank	Nation	Competitors	Time	Notes
1st place, gold medalist(s)	Brazil	Edir Ribeiro, Gloria Ferraz, Leda Santos, Erica da Silva	47.7	
2nd place, silver medalist(s)	Argentina	Alicia Kaufmanas, Emilia Dyrzka, Ada Brener, Marta Buongiorno	47.9	
3rd place, bronze medalist(s)	Chile	Nelly Orellana, María Cristina Ducci, Carlota Ulloa, Marisol Massot	49.0	

=== High jump ===
15 May

Rank	Name	Nationality	Result	Notes
1st place, gold medalist(s)	Maria Cipriano	Brazil	1.69	CR
2nd place, silver medalist(s)	Aída dos Santos	Brazil	1.66	
3rd place, bronze medalist(s)	Irenice Rodrigues	Brazil	1.51	
4	Ana Udini	Uruguay	1.51	
5	Lila Negro	Argentina	1.45	
6	Alicia Kaufmanas	Argentina	1.40	

=== Long jump ===
12 May

Rank	Name	Nationality	Result	Notes
1st place, gold medalist(s)	Carlota Ulloa	Chile	5.53	
2nd place, silver medalist(s)	Alicia Kaufmanas	Argentina	5.38	
3rd place, bronze medalist(s)	Edir Ribeiro	Brazil	5.28	
4	Laura das Chagas	Brazil	5.18	
5	Wanda dos Santos	Brazil	5.15	
6	María Cristina Irurzun	Argentina	5.06	

=== Shot put ===
13 May

Rank	Name	Nationality	Result	Notes
1st place, gold medalist(s)	Norma Suárez	Argentina	12.93	CR
2nd place, silver medalist(s)	Miriam Yutronic	Chile	12.38	
3rd place, bronze medalist(s)	Eliana Bahamondes	Chile	12.25	
4	Maria de Lourdes Conceição	Brazil	12.17	
5	Ingeborg Mello	Argentina	11.46	
6	Celia Nardim	Brazil	11.19	

=== Discus throw ===
8 May

Rank	Name	Nationality	Result	Notes
1st place, gold medalist(s)	Miriam Yutronic	Chile	45.33	
2nd place, silver medalist(s)	Odete Domingos	Brazil	39.92	
3rd place, bronze medalist(s)	Isolina Vergara	Colombia	39.73	
4	Ingeborg Mello	Argentina	39.25	
5	Norma Suárez	Argentina	35.80	
6	María de Lourdes Conceição	Brazil	34.91	

=== Javelin throw ===
16 May – Old model

Rank	Name	Nationality	Result	Notes
1st place, gold medalist(s)	Kiyomi Nakagawa	Brazil	41.51	
2nd place, silver medalist(s)	Delia Vera	Peru	40.76	
3rd place, bronze medalist(s)	Rosa Molina	Chile	40.23	
4	Helena Albrecht	Brazil	38.94	
5	Celia Nardim	Brazil	37.26	
6	Vilma Totaro	Argentina	34.09	
