= Athletics at the 1963 Summer Universiade – Men's 400 metres hurdles =

The men's 400 metres hurdles event at the 1963 Summer Universiade was held at the Estádio Olímpico Monumental in Porto Alegre with the final on 7 September 1963.

== Medalists ==
Gold	Silver	Bronze
Roberto Frinolli; Italy	Mike Hogan; Great Britain	Salvatore Morale; Italy

== Results ==
=== Heats ===
Rank	Heat	Name	Nationality	Time	Notes
1	1	Roberto Frinolli	Italy	52.90	Q
2	1	Mike Hogan	Great Britain	53.26	Q
3	1	Edmond Van Praagh	France	53.62	Q
4	1	Anubes da Silva	Brazil	54.0	
5	1	Francisco Javier Sainz	Spain	55.6	
1	2	José Cavero	Peru	52.96	Q
2	2	Salvatore Morale	Italy	52.99	Q
3	2	Robert Poirier	France	53.07	Q
4	2	Wilfried Geeroms	Belgium	54.0	
	2	João Gonçalves	Brazil	DQ	

=== Final ===
Rank	Athlete	Nationality	Time	Notes
1st place, gold medalist(s)	Roberto Frinolli	Italy	50.48	
2nd place, silver medalist(s)	Mike Hogan	Great Britain	51.52	
3rd place, bronze medalist(s)	Salvatore Morale	Italy	51.95	
4	Robert Poirier	France	52.28	
5	José Cavero	Peru	52.48	
	Edmond Van Praagh	France	DQ	
