= Gustavo Gutiérrez (disambiguation) =

Gustavo Gutiérrez (1928–2024) was a Peruvian philosopher, theologian, and Dominican priest

Gustavo Gutiérrez may also refer to:

- Gustavo Gutiérrez (fencer) (born 1933), Venezuelan fencer
- Gustavo Gutiérrez (athlete) (born 1939), Ecuadorian long-distance runner
- Gustavo Gutiérrez (footballer) (born 1996), Mexican footballer
- Gustavo Gutiérrez Cabello (born 1940), Colombian songwriter
