= Irene Martínez =

Cuban track and field athlete

Personal information
- Born: 28 October 1946 Cienfuegos, Cuba
- Died: April 2014 (aged 67) Havana, Cuba

Sport
- Sport: Track and field
Medal record
Representing Cuba
Pan American Games
| Gold medal – first place | 1967 Winnipeg | Long jump |
Central American and Caribbean Games
| Gold medal – first place | 1966 San Juan | Long jump |
Central American and Caribbean Championships
| Gold medal – first place | 1967 Xalapa | Long jump |
Summer Universiade
| Bronze medal – third place | 1963 Porto Alegre | 4x100m relay |

Irene Martínez Tartabull (28 October 1946 – April 2014) was a Cuban track and field athlete who competed in the long jump and the short sprints. She was the first woman from the Central American and Caribbean region to clear six metres in the long jump. She was also the first Cuban to win a jumps gold medal at the Pan American Games – a discipline in which the country later became highly successful.

Martínez broke the Cuban record for the long jump eleven times, resulting in a lifetime best of 6.33 m (20 ft 9 in). She was a gold medallist in the long jump at the 1966 Central American and Caribbean Games and was the inaugural champion at the 1967 Central American and Caribbean Championships in Athletics. She also enjoyed success in the 4 × 100 metres relay, winning medals at the 1963 Pan American Games, 1963 Summer Universiade and the 1966 CAC Games, as well as twice breaking the national record for the event.

== Career ==
=== Early life and career ===
Born in Cienfuegos, she was among the first athletes to enroll in the new national athletics program established after the end of the Cuban Revolution in 1959. Her talent for running was noticed at high school and she transferred to a school in Havana to focus on sports in 1961. Among her contemporaries were sprinters Aurelia Pentón, Fulgencia Romay, and Miguelina Cobián.

Her first international selection came at the age of fifteen and she managed fourth place in the long jump at the 1962 Central American and Caribbean Games. She rose to prominence the following year – at the 1963 Pan American Games in São Paulo she took fifth in the long jump and helped set a Cuban record in the 4 × 100 metres relay of 46.44 seconds alongside Romay, Cobián and Nereida Borges. She added to this with a fourth-place finish in the long jump and a relay bronze at the 1963 Summer Universiade. That year she achieved her first national record in the long jump, clearing 5.51 m (18 ft 3/4 in) in June (to beat Bertha Díaz's 1962 CAC Games-winning mark by one centimetre), then improving further to 5.71 m (18 ft 8 3/4 in) one week later. Her fourth national record of the year came that December, as she was part of a Cuban relay quartet that ran 46.2 seconds.

=== Regional champion ===
Despite being the country's best jumper, Martínez was not selected for the 1964 Tokyo Olympics on account of her young age (she was still 17 at the time of the tournament). That year, she improved the Cuban long jump record on five occasions, beginning with a jump of 5.75 m (18 ft 10 1/4 in) in April and ending with a clearance of 5.99 m (19 ft 7 3/4 in) in November. She struggled to improve in the 1965 season, managing a best of 5.80 m (19 ft 1/4 in), but set a lifetime best in the 100 metres with a time of 11.8 seconds.

Martínez became the first woman from the Central America and Caribbean region to surpass six metres for the long jump, doing so with a jumps of 6.07 m (19 ft 10 3/4 in) then 6.10 m (20 ft 0 in) at a meeting in Havana in April 1966. Her first major individual success followed at the 1966 Central American and Caribbean Games, where she succeeded fellow Cuban Díaz to the women's long jump title with a Games record of 5.87 m (19 ft 3 in). (The title would remain in Cuban hands for all but one edition over the next 25 years, courtesy of wins by Marcia Garbey, Eloína Echevarría and Niurka Montalvo.) The 21-year-old won the third major international relay medal of her career, taking the silver with the Cuban women behind a Jamaican team led by 200 metres champion Una Morris. Martínez had a very patriotic approach to the competition and held up her performance as a tribute to her country – her greatest memory of the period was of Fidel Castro signing her two medals.

The best performances of her career were in the 1967 season. In June she improved the Cuban national record for the tenth time with a jump of 6.15 m (20 ft 2 in) in Budapest. At the 1967 Central American and Caribbean Championships in Athletics she became the first women's long jump champion with a result of 5.65 m (18 ft 6 1/4 in), narrowly beating her compatriot Garbey – Marina Samuells and Garbey would turn Martínez's 1967 win into a four-edition streak of wins for Cuba. Cuba took a sweep of the women's titles at the event held in Mexico.

=== American gold and late career ===
Martínez was chosen for the 1967 Pan American Games and she came up against the defending champion, Willye White of the United States. White produced a jump of 6.17 m (20 ft 2 3/4 in) – two centimetres further than her winning jump four years earlier. However, that mark was not sufficient as Martínez produced the best jump of her life at 6.33 m (20 ft 9 in). This was a Pan American Games record and good 13 cm clear of runner-up Gisela Vidal (6.20 m). The pre-event favourite, American Martha Watson, did not make the podium. Martínez's performance made her the first ever Cuban athlete – male or female – to win a Pan American gold medal in a jumping discipline. Cuba has since gone on to produce numerous world class jumpers, such as world record holder Javier Sotomayor, four-time long jump world champion Iván Pedroso and double triple jump world champion Yargelis Savigne.

She hoped to be selected for Cuba at the 1968 Summer Olympics, but did not receive a call-up to compete. The selectors requested that she be part of the team as an alternate for the 4 × 100 metres relay, but she refused due to her damaged pride of not being selected individually – a decision she regretted later in life. She produced marks of 5.68 m (18 ft 7 1/2 in) and 5.65 m (18 ft 6 1/4 in) in the 1969 and 1970 seasons, but she retired at age 24, having failed to recapture her best form.

After retiring from competition she went into academia and became a professor of physical education at the Instituto Técnico Militar in Havana. She remained in the role for almost 30 years. She died in April 2014 and was buried at Colon Cemetery, Havana, alongside other Cuban female athletes.

== International competitions ==
| Year | Competition | Venue | Position | Event | Notes |
|---|---|---|---|---|---|
| 1962 | Central American and Caribbean Games | Kingston, Jamaica | 4th | Long jump | 5.28 m |
| 1963 | Pan American Games | São Paulo, Brazil | 2nd | 4 × 100 m relay | 46.44 |
| 1963 | Pan American Games | São Paulo, Brazil | 5th | Long jump | 5.39 m |
| 1963 | Universiade | Porto Alegre, Brazil | 3rd | 4 × 100 m relay | 47.5 |
| 1963 | Universiade | Porto Alegre, Brazil | 4th | Long jump | 5.43 m |
| 1966 | Central American and Caribbean Games | San Juan, Puerto Rico | 9th (h) | 80 m hurdles | 12.5 |
| 1966 | Central American and Caribbean Games | San Juan, Puerto Rico | 1st | Long jump | 5.87 m |
| 1966 | Central American and Caribbean Games | San Juan, Puerto Rico | 2nd | 4 × 100 m relay | 46.5 |
| 1967 | Pan American Games | Winnipeg, Canada | 1st | Long jump | 6.33 m |
| 1967 | CAC Championships | Xalapa, Mexico | 1st | Long jump | 5.65 m |
