= Athletics at the 1963 Pan American Games – Men's 400 metres hurdles =

Men's 400 metres hurdles at the Pan American Games

The men's 400 metres hurdles event at the 1963 Pan American Games was held at the Pacaembu Stadium in São Paulo on 30 April and 1 May.

== Medalists ==
Gold	Silver	Bronze
Juan Carlos Dyrzka; Argentina	Willie Atterbury; United States	Russ Rogers; United States

== Results ==
=== Heats ===
Rank	Heat	Name	Nationality	Time	Notes
1	1	Willie Atterbury	United States	51.54	Q
2	1	Anubes da Silva	Brazil	52.08	Q
3	1	Aristides Pineda	Venezuela	52.3	
4	2	Víctor Maldonado	Venezuela	53.04	Q
5	3	Juan Carlos Dyrzka	Argentina	53.26	Q
6	3	José Cavero	Peru	53.58	Q
7	2	Russ Rogers	United States	53.78	Q
8	2	Jaime Frasser	Ecuador	54.18	
9	2	Juan Montes	Puerto Rico	54.33	
10	3	Jorge Cumberbach	Cuba	54.38	
	1	Tony Harper	Bermuda	DNS	
	1	Heriberto Cruz	Puerto Rico	DNS	
	3	João Carlos Gonzales	Brazil	DNS	

=== Final ===
Rank	Name	Nationality	Time	Notes
1st place, gold medalist(s)	Juan Carlos Dyrzka	Argentina	50.32	
2nd place, silver medalist(s)	Willie Atterbury	United States	50.49	
3rd place, bronze medalist(s)	Russ Rogers	United States	51.19	
4	Víctor Maldonado	Venezuela	51.89	
5	Anubes da Silva	Brazil	52.13	
6	José Cavero	Peru	53.10	
