= 1961 South American Championships in Athletics – Results =

These are the results of the 1961 South American Championships in Athletics which took place at the Estadio Nacional in Lima, Peru, between 20 and 28 May. Only the top 6 athletes have been reported for field events.

== Men's results ==
=== 100 metres ===
Heats – 20 May

Rank	Heat	Name	Nationality	Time	Notes
1	1	Luis Vienna	Argentina	10.8	Q
2	1	Alberto Keitel	Chile	10.8	Q
3	1	Juan Hasegawa	Peru	11.2	Q
4	1	Noel Revello	Uruguay	11.4	
1	2	Arquímedes Herrera	Venezuela	10.6	Q
2	2	Juan Stocker	Argentina	10.8	Q
3	2	Affonso da Silva	Brazil	11.0	Q
4	2	Iván Moreno	Chile	11.1	
5	2	Gerardo Di Tolla	Peru	11.3	
1	3	Horacio Esteves	Venezuela	10.6	Q
2	3	João Pires Sobrinho	Brazil	11.2	Q
3	3	Roberto Ferrario	Argentina	11.2	Q
4	3	Manuel Monforte	Peru	11.3	
1	4	José Telles da Conceição	Brazil	10.6	Q
2	4	Rafael Romero	Venezuela	10.7	Q
3	4	Juan Francisco Aguilar	Uruguay	11.2	Q
4	4	Leonel Pedroza	Colombia	11.3	

Semifinals – 20 May

Rank	Heat	Name	Nationality	Time	Notes
1	1	Horacio Esteves	Venezuela	10.4	Q
2	1	José Telles da Conceição	Brazil	10.5	Q
3	1	Luis Vienna	Argentina	10.8	Q
4	1	Affonso da Silva	Brazil	10.9	
5	1	Roberto Ferrario	Argentina	11.1	
	1	Juan Francisco Aguilar	Uruguay	?	
1	2	Arquímedes Herrera	Venezuela	10.7	Q
2	2	Rafael Romero	Venezuela	10.8	Q
3	2	Alberto Keitel	Chile	10.8	Q
4	2	Juan Stocker	Argentina	11.1	
5	2	Juan Hasegawa	Peru	11.1	
6	2	João Pires Sobrinho	Brazil	11.6	

Final – 21 May

Rank	Name	Nationality	Time	Notes
1st place, gold medalist(s)	Arquímedes Herrera	Venezuela	10.6	
2nd place, silver medalist(s)	Horacio Esteves	Venezuela	10.6	
3rd place, bronze medalist(s)	José Telles da Conceição	Brazil	10.7	
4	Rafael Romero	Venezuela	10.9	
5	Luis Vienna	Argentina	10.9	
6	Alberto Keitel	Chile	10.9	

=== 200 metres ===
Heats – 23 May

Rank	Heat	Name	Nationality	Time	Notes
1	1	Rafael Romero	Venezuela	21.9	Q
2	1	João Pires Sobrinho	Brazil	22.5	Q
3	1	Guillermo Bahler	Argentina	22.6	Q
4	1	Leonel Pedroza	Colombia	22.8	
1	2	Juan Stocker	Argentina	21.9	Q
2	2	Alberto Keitel	Chile	22.0	Q
3	2	Affonso da Silva	Brazil	22.3	Q
4	2	Eulogio Gomes	Peru	22.5	
1	3	Luis Vienna	Argentina	21.7	Q
2	3	Horacio Esteves	Venezuela	21.8	Q
3	3	Iván Moreno	Chile	22.3	Q
4	3	Juan Francisco Aguilar	Uruguay	22.5	
5	3	Juan Hasegawa	Peru	22.9	
1	4	Arquímedes Herrera	Venezuela	21.6	Q
2	4	José Telles da Conceição	Brazil	22.3	Q
3	4	Gerardo Di Tolla	Peru	22.9	Q
4	4	Moisés Chávez	Chile	23.0	

Semifinals – 23 May

Rank	Heat	Name	Nationality	Time	Notes
1	1	Arquímedes Herrera	Venezuela	21.0	Q
2	1	Rafael Romero	Venezuela	21.6	Q
3	1	José Telles da Conceição	Brazil	21.6	Q
4	1	Juan Stocker	Argentina	21.8	
5	1	Iván Moreno	Chile	22.5	
6	1	Gerardo Di Tolla	Peru	22.9	
1	2	Horacio Esteves	Venezuela	21.6	Q
2	2	Alberto Keitel	Chile	21.7	Q
3	2	Luis Vienna	Argentina	21.8	Q
4	2	Affonso da Silva	Brazil	22.5	
5	2	Guillermo Bahler	Argentina	22.6	
6	2	João Pires Sobrinho	Brazil	22.7	

Final – 25 May

Rank	Name	Nationality	Time	Notes
1st place, gold medalist(s)	Horacio Esteves	Venezuela	21.3	
2nd place, silver medalist(s)	Arquímedes Herrera	Venezuela	21.6	
3rd place, bronze medalist(s)	Luis Vienna	Argentina	21.8	
4	Alberto Keitel	Chile	22.1	
5	José Telles da Conceição	Brazil	22.1	
6	Rafael Romero	Venezuela	22.8	

=== 400 metres ===
Heats – 20 May

Rank	Heat	Name	Nationality	Time	Notes
1	1	Emilio Romero	Venezuela	51.3	Q
2	1	Ulisses dos Santos	Brazil	51.5	Q
3	1	Raúl Zabala	Argentina	51.9	Q
4	1	Moisés Chávez	Chile	52.1	
5	1	Jorge Canales	Peru	52.4	
1	2	Juan Francisco Aguilar	Uruguay	51.4	Q
2	2	Peter Ostemeier	Brazil	51.6	Q
3	2	Juan Carlos Dyrzka	Argentina	51.7	Q
4	2	Mario Gastelú	Peru	53.6	
1	3	Juan Stocker	Argentina	51.3	Q
2	3	Leonel Pedroza	Colombia	51.4	Q
3	3	Arístides Pineda	Venezuela	51.5	Q
4	3	Hugo Krauss	Chile	51.6	
5	3	Carlos Pereyra	Uruguay	52.3	
1	4	Anubes da Silva	Brazil	49.9	Q
2	4	Julio León	Chile	50.2	Q
3	4	Eulogio Gómez	Peru	50.7	Q
4	4	Jorge Vilaboa	Uruguay	51.9	
	4	Hortensio Fusil	Venezuela	DQ	

Semifinals – 20 May

Rank	Heat	Name	Nationality	Time	Notes
1	1	Anubes da Silva	Brazil	49.9	Q
2	1	Juan Carlos Dyrzka	Argentina	50.4	Q
3	1	Peter Ostemeier	Brazil	51.0	Q
4	1	Juan Francisco Aguilar	Uruguay	51.4	
5	1	Emilio Romero	Venezuela	52.4	
6	1	Raúl Zabala	Argentina	53.1	
1	2	Julio León	Chile	50.6	Q
2	2	Ulisses dos Santos	Brazil	50.8	Q
3	2	Eulogio Gómez	Peru	50.9	Q
4	2	Juan Stocker	Argentina	51.1	
5	2	Leonel Pedroza	Colombia	51.3	
6	2	Arístides Pineda	Venezuela	53.1	

Final – 21 May

Rank	Name	Nationality	Time	Notes
1st place, gold medalist(s)	Anubes da Silva	Brazil	48.8	
2nd place, silver medalist(s)	Juan Carlos Dyrzka	Argentina	49.3	
3rd place, bronze medalist(s)	Eulogio Gómez	Peru	50.0	
4	Peter Ostemeier	Brazil	50.6	
5	Ulisses dos Santos	Brazil	50.7	
6	Julio León	Chile	1:01.8	

=== 800 metres ===
Heats – 23 May

Rank	Heat	Name	Nationality	Time	Notes
1	1	Ramón Sandoval	Chile	1:56.6	Q
2	1	José Neira	Colombia	1:56.7	Q
3	1	Paulo de Araújo	Brazil	1:56.8	Q
4	1	Harvey Borrero	Colombia	1:56.8	Q
5	1	Silverio da Silva	Brazil	1:57.0	
6	1	Víctor Lozano	Argentina	1:57.5	
	1	Rodolfo Antelo	Argentina	NT	
1	2	Eduardo Balducci	Argentina	1:57.7	Q
2	2	Álvaro Mejía	Colombia	1:58.1	Q
3	2	Odilon Dias Neto	Brazil	1:58.3	Q
4	2	Enrique Alfonso	Venezuela	1:58.7	Q
5	2	Jacinto Farías	Uruguay	1:58.7	
6	2	Hugo Krauss	Chile	1:59.8	
	2	Raúl Pereira	Peru	NT	
	2	Armin Oswald	Chile	NT	

Final – 25 May

Rank	Name	Nationality	Time	Notes
1st place, gold medalist(s)	Ramón Sandoval	Chile	1:51.2	
2nd place, silver medalist(s)	José Neira	Colombia	1:52.6	NR
3rd place, bronze medalist(s)	Eduardo Balducci	Argentina	1:53.3	
4	Paulo de Araújo	Brazil	1:54.8	
5	Harvey Borrero	Colombia	1:55.3	
6	Silverio da Silva	Brazil	1:56.2	
7	Álvaro Mejía	Colombia	NT	
8	Enrique Alfonso	Venezuela	NT	

=== 1500 metres ===
21 May

Rank	Name	Nationality	Time	Notes
1st place, gold medalist(s)	Ramón Sandoval	Chile	3:51.2	
2nd place, silver medalist(s)	Osvaldo Suárez	Argentina	3:53.5	
3rd place, bronze medalist(s)	Eduardo Balducci	Argentina	3:53.6	
4	Ricardo Vidal	Chile	3:55.5	
5	Domingo Amaizón	Argentina	3:56.3	
6	Belchior Gomes	Brazil	3:56.6	
?	Álvaro Mejía	Colombia	3:57.6	NR
?	Harvey Borrero	Colombia	NT	

=== 5000 metres ===
20 May

Rank	Name	Nationality	Time	Notes
1st place, gold medalist(s)	Osvaldo Suárez	Argentina	14:54.7	
2nd place, silver medalist(s)	Luis Sandobal	Argentina	14:55.5	
3rd place, bronze medalist(s)	Alberto Ríos	Argentina	15:02.6	
4	Luis Campusano	Chile	15:18.1	
5	Jorge González	Chile	15:24.7	
6	João dos Santos Filho	Brazil	15:29.9	
7	José Primo	Brazil	NT	
8	Francisco Allen	Chile	NT	

=== 10,000 metres ===
25 May

Rank	Name	Nationality	Time	Notes
1st place, gold medalist(s)	Osvaldo Suárez	Argentina	30:18.1	
2nd place, silver medalist(s)	Luis Sandobal	Argentina	31:13.9	
3rd place, bronze medalist(s)	Luis Campusano	Chile	31:27.3	
4	Gumersindo Gómez	Argentina	31:27.8	
5	Jorge González	Chile	32:01.8	
6	Ricardo Vidal	Chile	32:21.7	
7	Hugo Domínguez	Uruguay	NT	
8	João dos Santos Filho	Brazil	NT	
9	Manuel Cabrera	Colombia	33:00.3	NR

=== Marathon ===
28 May

Rank	Name	Nationality	Time	Notes
1st place, gold medalist(s)	Juan Silva	Chile	2:39:36	CR
2nd place, silver medalist(s)	Ricardo Vidal	Chile	2:41:16	
3rd place, bronze medalist(s)	Armando Pino	Argentina	2:42:21	
4	José Marcelo Canelo	Peru	2:45:02	
5	Alejandro Montaño	Bolivia	2:46:12	
6	Gumersindo Gómez	Argentina	NT	
7	Luis Navas	Colombia	NT	
8	Luis Molina	Peru	NT	
9	Waldir Nascimento	Brazil	NT	
	Robustiano Larrea	Argentina	NT	
	João dos Santos Filho	Brazil	NT	
	Walter Torres	Uruguay	NT	
	Germán Lozano	Colombia	NT	
	Manuel Caberra	Colombia	NT	
	Daniel García	Peru	NT	
	Eugenio Rivera	Chile	DNF	
	José Campos	Brazil	DQ	

=== 110 metres hurdles ===
Heats – 21 May

Rank	Heat	Name	Nationality	Time	Notes
1	1	José Telles da Conceição	Brazil	14.8	Q
2	1	John Muñoz	Venezuela	15.3	Q
3	1	Carlos Witting	Chile	15.4	
4	1	Guillermo Vallania	Argentina	15.6	
5	1	Roberto Abugattás	Peru	16.2	
1	2	Carlos Mossa	Brazil	15.1	Q
2	2	Teófilo Davis Bell	Venezuela	15.1	Q
3	2	Juan Carlos Dyrzka	Argentina	15.2	
4	2	Juan Manuel Jordán	Chile	16.3	
5	2	Zacarías Durán	Peru	17.3	
1	3	José Cavero	Peru	15.7	Q
2	3	Ariel Standen	Chile	16.1	Q
3	3	Ramón Bastardo	Venezuela	16.6	
	3	Joel Silva	Brazil	DNF	

Final – 23 May

Rank	Name	Nationality	Time	Notes
1st place, gold medalist(s)	Carlos Mossa	Brazil	14.5	=CR
2nd place, silver medalist(s)	José Telles da Conceição	Brazil	14.7	
3rd place, bronze medalist(s)	Teófilo Davis Bell	Venezuela	15.0	
4	John Muñoz	Venezuela	15.3	
5	Ariel Standen	Chile	15.7	
6	José Cavero	Peru	15.9	

=== 400 metres hurdles ===
Heats – 25 May

Rank	Heat	Name	Nationality	Time	Notes
1	1	Anubes da Silva	Brazil	55.2	Q
2	1	Arístides Pineda	Venezuela	55.4	Q
3	1	Raúl Zabala	Argentina	56.4	
4	1	Mario Gastelú	Peru	57.0	
5	1	Juan Manuel Jordán	Chile	57.6	
1	2	Juan Carlos Dyrzka	Argentina	54.2	Q
2	2	Ulisses dos Santos	Brazil	54.3	Q
3	2	Tito Bracho	Venezuela	55.6	
1	3	José Cavero	Peru	55.8	Q
2	3	Ariel Standen	Chile	57.0	Q
3	3	Landualdo da Silva	Brazil	57.2	

Final – 27 May

Rank	Name	Nationality	Time	Notes
1st place, gold medalist(s)	Juan Carlos Dyrzka	Argentina	52.3	
2nd place, silver medalist(s)	Anubes da Silva	Brazil	52.8	
3rd place, bronze medalist(s)	Ulisses dos Santos	Brazil	54.0	
4	Arístides Pineda	Venezuela	54.6	
5	José Cavero	Peru	54.6	
6	Ariel Standen	Chile	1:00.3	

=== 3000 metres steeplechase ===
27 May

Rank	Name	Nationality	Time	Notes
1st place, gold medalist(s)	Sebastião Mendes	Brazil	9:14.8	
2nd place, silver medalist(s)	Domingo Amaizón	Argentina	9:20.6	
3rd place, bronze medalist(s)	Alberto Ríos	Argentina	9:23.4	
4	Luis Sandobal	Argentina	9:28.2	
5	Francisco Allen	Chile	9:34.6	
6	Belchior Gomes	Brazil	9:41.8	
7	José Primo	Brazil	NT	
8	Luis Campusano	Chile	NT	
9	José García	Peru	NT	

=== 4 × 100 metres relay ===
27 May

Rank	Nation	Competitors	Time	Notes
1st place, gold medalist(s)	Venezuela	Clive Bonas, Arquímedes Herrera, Horacio Esteves, Rafael Romero	41.0	
2nd place, silver medalist(s)	Brazil	Joel Costa, Jorge de Barros, Affonso da Silva, José da Conceição	41.5	
3rd place, bronze medalist(s)	Argentina	Guillermo Bahler, Juan Stocker, Roberto Ferrairo, Luis Vienna	42.2	
4	Chile	Carlos Vera, Alberto Keitel, Iván Moreno, Hugo Krauss	42.5	
5	Peru	Gerardo Di Tolla, Manuel Monforte, Juan Hasegawa, Eulogio Gómez	43.8	
6	Uruguay	Fermín Donazar, Jorge Vilaboa, Carlos Pereyra, Juan Francisco Aguilar	43.9	

=== 4 × 400 metres relay ===
28 May

Rank	Nation	Competitors	Time	Notes
1st place, gold medalist(s)	Venezuela	Emilio Romero, Rafael Romero, Horacio Esteves, Hortensio Fucil	3:16.0	
2nd place, silver medalist(s)	Argentina	Raúl Zabala, Luis Vienna, Juan Stocker, Juan Carlos Dyrzka	3:16.9	
3rd place, bronze medalist(s)	Brazil	Cris Ferreira, Ulisses dos Santos, Peter Ostermeier, Anubes da Silva	3:18.1	
4	Peru	Jorge Canales, Eduardo Scamarone, José Cavero, Gerardo Di Tolla	3:22.7	
5	Chile	Moisés Chávez, Armin Oswald, Ramón Sandoval, Alberto Keitel	3:23.8	
6	Uruguay	Juan Francisco Aguilar, Jorge Vilaboa, Jacinto Farías, Carlos Pereyra	3:32.4	

=== High jump ===
20 May

Rank	Name	Nationality	Result	Notes
1st place, gold medalist(s)	Eugenio Velasco	Chile	1.95	
2nd place, silver medalist(s)	Eleuterio Fassi	Argentina	1.95	
3rd place, bronze medalist(s)	Horacio Martínez	Argentina	1.95	
4	Paulo da Silva	Brazil	1.90	
5	Alfredo Lopes	Brazil	1.85	
6	Ramón Bastardo	Venezuela	1.85	

=== Pole vault ===
23 May

Rank	Name	Nationality	Result	Notes
1st place, gold medalist(s)	Marcelo de Souza	Brazil	3.90	
2nd place, silver medalist(s)	Tomatsu Nishida	Brazil	3.90	
3rd place, bronze medalist(s)	Brígido Iriarte	Venezuela	3.80	
4	José Infante	Chile	3.80	
5	Cristian Raab	Chile	3.80	
6	Luis Meza	Chile	3.80	

=== Long jump ===
21 May

Rank	Name	Nationality	Result	Notes
1st place, gold medalist(s)	John Muñoz	Venezuela	7.13	
2nd place, silver medalist(s)	Newton de Castro	Brazil	7.06	
3rd place, bronze medalist(s)	Fermín Donazar	Uruguay	6.92	
4	Jorge Castillo	Argentina	6.89	
5	Carlos Tornquist	Chile	6.89	
6	Alfredo Lopes	Brazil	6.86	

=== Triple jump ===
25 May

Rank	Name	Nationality	Result	Notes
1st place, gold medalist(s)	Asnoldo Devonish	Venezuela	14.68	
2nd place, silver medalist(s)	Sylvio Moreira	Brazil	14.52	
3rd place, bronze medalist(s)	Reinaldo de Oliveira	Brazil	14.42	
4	Carlos Vera	Chile	14.24	
5	Luis Huarcaya	Peru	14.17	
6	Jorge Castillo	Argentina	14.15	

=== Shot put ===
23 May

Rank	Name	Nationality	Result	Notes
1st place, gold medalist(s)	Enrique Helf	Argentina	15.86	CR
2nd place, silver medalist(s)	Luis Di Cursi	Argentina	15.69	
3rd place, bronze medalist(s)	Héctor Thomas	Venezuela	14.58	
4	Roque Eguillor	Argentina	14.52	
5	Osmar Duque	Brazil	14.18	
6	Isolino Taborda	Brazil	13.99	
?	Dagoberto González	Colombia	13.30	NR

=== Discus throw ===
27 May

Rank	Name	Nationality	Result	Notes
1st place, gold medalist(s)	Günther Kruse	Argentina	48.57	
2nd place, silver medalist(s)	Enrique Helf	Argentina	46.98	
3rd place, bronze medalist(s)	Héctor Menacho	Peru	46.97	
4	Dieter Gevert	Chile	46.82	
5	Daniel Cereali	Venezuela	46.71	
6	Dagoberto González	Colombia	46.64	

=== Hammer throw ===
21 May

Rank	Name	Nationality	Result	Notes
1st place, gold medalist(s)	Daniel Cereali	Venezuela	52.55	
2nd place, silver medalist(s)	Roberto Chapchap	Brazil	50.81	
3rd place, bronze medalist(s)	Carlos Marzo	Argentina	50.50	
4	Walter Rodrigues	Brazil	50.33	
5	Alejandro Díaz	Chile	49.80	
6	Edmundo Zúñiga	Chile	46.01	
7	Julio Valverdo	Peru	?	

=== Javelin throw ===
20 May – old model

Rank	Name	Nationality	Result	Notes
1st place, gold medalist(s)	Ricardo Heber	Argentina	64.25	
2nd place, silver medalist(s)	Orlando Garrido	Brazil	63.56	
3rd place, bronze medalist(s)	Luis Zárate	Peru	61.40	
4	Osmar Duque	Brazil	61.29	
5	Antolín Rodríguez	Argentina	61.19	
6	Florentino Rodríguez	Colombia	59.81	NR

=== Decathlon ===
27–28 May – 1952 tables (1985 conversions given with *)

The highest mark recorded in each event is highlighted in yellow

Rank	Athlete	Nationality	100m	LJ	SP	HJ	400m	110m H	DT	PV	JT	1500m	Points	Conv.	Notes
1st place, gold medalist(s)	Bernabé Souza	Brazil	11.4	6.57	11.22	1.78	52.0	15.8	27.77	3.30	41.78	4:31.6	5662	6106*	
2nd place, silver medalist(s)	Tito Bracho	Venezuela	11.1	6.54	10.89	1.78	49.5	16.3	29.36	3.20	43.22	4:57.2	5587	6020*	
3rd place, bronze medalist(s)	Cleomenes da Cunha	Brazil	11.8	5.94	10.22	1.76	54.4	15.7	36.64	3.50	65.81	4:53.3	5502	6000*	
4	Héctor González	Argentina	11.4	6.41	11.66	1.73	50.9	16.4	33.89	2.80	45.15	4:47.2	5450	5188*	
5	Ramón Bastardo	Venezuela	11.4	6.92	9.81	1.85	52.1	16.3	27.11	3.20	44.85	5:46.6	5164	5697*	
6	Luís Fernandes	Brazil	11.8	6.14	10.13	1.60	52.0	15.9	30.90	3.10	42.64	4:32.1	5140	5727*	
7	Héctor Thomas	Venezuela	11.7	6.17	12.85	1.80	60.1	17.1	42.38	3.00	52.56	5:55.8	4984	5544*	
8	Luis Meza	Chile	11.6	5.56	9.71	1.65	51.6	18.4	30.28	3.60	39.49	4:53.1	4723	5363*	
9	Andrés Larrain	Chile	11.6	5.62	12.43	1.60	51.8	17.5	34.93	NM	39.98	4:48.0	4580	5197*	
	Carlos Monge	Peru	11.4	?	–	–	–	–	–	–	–	–	DNF	–	
	Roberto Vargas	Peru	12.1	?	–	–	–	–	–	–	–	–	DNF	–	

== Women's results ==
=== 100 metres ===
Heats – 20 May

Rank	Heat	Name	Nationality	Time	Notes
1	1	Edith Berg	Argentina	12.7	Q
2	1	Maria Caldeira	Brazil	13.0	Q
3	1	Doris Peter	Chile	13.1	
4	1	Juan Ghislieri	Peru	13.3	
5	1	Ana Alvarado	Colombia	13.3	
1	2	Nancy Correa	Chile	12.0	Q
2	2	Laurete Godoy	Brazil	13.0	Q
3	2	Emilia Dyrzka	Argentina	13.1	
4	2	Consuelo Buitrón	Peru	13.7	
1	3	Marisol Massot	Chile	12.7	Q
2	3	Érica da Silva	Brazil	12.8	Q
3	3	Teresa Toyama	Peru	12.9	

Final – 21 May

Rank	Name	Nationality	Time	Notes
1st place, gold medalist(s)	Edith Berg	Argentina	12.4	
2nd place, silver medalist(s)	Nancy Correa	Chile	12.4	
3rd place, bronze medalist(s)	Marisol Massot	Chile	12.5	
4	Érica da Silva	Brazil	12.7	
5	Maria Caldeira	Brazil	12.8	
6	Laurete Godoy	Brazil	12.8	

=== 200 metres ===
Heats – 27 May

Rank	Heat	Name	Nationality	Time	Notes
1	1	Ada Brener	Argentina	26.4	Q
2	1	Laurete Godoy	Brazil	26.5	Q
1	2	Marta Buongiorno	Argentina	26.3	Q
2	2	Ana Alvarado	Colombia	26.8	Q
3	2	Maria José de Lima	Brazil	26.8	
4	2	Aurora Bianchi	Chile	28.1	
5	2	Consuelo Buitrón	Peru	28.7	
1	3	Edith Berg	Argentina	25.6	Q
2	3	Érica da Silva	Brazil	26.1	Q
3	3	Nancy Correa	Chile	26.6	
4	3	Juana Ghislieri	Peru	27.3	

Final – 28 May

Rank	Name	Nationality	Time	Notes
1st place, gold medalist(s)	Edith Berg	Argentina	25.7	
2nd place, silver medalist(s)	Ada Brener	Argentina	25.8	
3rd place, bronze medalist(s)	Marta Buongiorno	Argentina	26.0	
4	Érica da Silva	Brazil	26.1	
5	Laurete Godoy	Brazil	26.3	
6	Ana Alvarado	Colombia	26.4	

=== 80 metres hurdles ===
Heats – 27 May

Rank	Heat	Name	Nationality	Time	Notes
1	1	Wanda dos Santos	Brazil	11.7	Q
2	1	Maria José de Lima	Brazil	11.8	Q
3	1	Edith Berg	Argentina	11.9	Q
4	1	Elvecia Bauer	Chile	12.4	
5	1	Olga Catter	Peru	12.5	
1	2	Maria de Lourdes Texeira	Brazil	11.9	Q
2	2	Graciela Paviotti	Argentina	12.1	Q
3	2	Eliana Gaete	Chile	12.2	Q

Final – 28 May

Rank	Name	Nationality	Time	Notes
1st place, gold medalist(s)	Wanda dos Santos	Brazil	11.5	
2nd place, silver medalist(s)	Maria José de Lima	Brazil	11.9	
3rd place, bronze medalist(s)	Maria de Lourdes Texeira	Brazil	12.0	
4	Edith Berg	Argentina	12.4	
5	Graciela Paviotti	Argentina	12.4	
6	Eliana Gaete	Chile	12.7	

=== 4 × 100 metres relay ===
27 May

Rank	Nation	Competitors	Time	Notes
1st place, gold medalist(s)	Brazil	Wanda dos Santos, Maria Caldeira, Laurette Godoy, Érica da Silva	48.9	
2nd place, silver medalist(s)	Argentina	Alicia Kaufmanas, Marta Buongiorno, Ada Brener, Edith Berg	48.9	
3rd place, bronze medalist(s)	Chile	Aurora Bianchi, Marisol Massot, Doris Peter, Nancy Correa	49.2	
4	Peru	Consuelo Buitrón, Teresa Toyama, Olga Catter, Juana Ghislieri	52.9	

=== High jump ===
27 May

Rank	Name	Nationality	Result	Notes
1st place, gold medalist(s)	Aída dos Santos	Brazil	1.60	=CR
2nd place, silver medalist(s)	Nelly Gómez	Chile	1.55	
3rd place, bronze medalist(s)	Maria José de Lima	Brazil	1.50	
4	Delcy Marques	Brazil	1.50	
5	Deonildes Martins	Uruguay	1.50	
6	Elvecia Bauer	Chile	1.45	
	Smiliana Dezulovic	Chile	1.40	

=== Long jump ===
23 May

Rank	Name	Nationality	Result	Notes
1st place, gold medalist(s)	Wanda dos Santos	Brazil	5.38	
2nd place, silver medalist(s)	Ada Brener	Argentina	5.32	
3rd place, bronze medalist(s)	Alicia Kaufmanas	Argentina	5.21	
4	Laura das Chagas	Brazil	5.06	
5	Graciela Paviotti	Argentina	4.92	
6	Maria José de Lima	Brazil	4.72	

=== Shot put ===
25 May

Rank	Name	Nationality	Result	Notes
1st place, gold medalist(s)	Ingeborg Pfüller	Argentina	12.41	
2nd place, silver medalist(s)	Vera Trezoitko	Brazil	12.16	
3rd place, bronze medalist(s)	Pradelia Delgado	Chile	11.81	
4	Martha Miraglia	Brazil	11.66	
5	Mabel Dematei	Argentina	11.55	
6	Smiliana Dezulovic	Chile	11.32	

=== Discus throw ===
20 May

Rank	Name	Nationality	Result	Notes
1st place, gold medalist(s)	Ingeborg Pfüller	Argentina	41.92	
2nd place, silver medalist(s)	Pradelia Delgado	Chile	39.78	
3rd place, bronze medalist(s)	Sumiko Yamakawa	Brazil	38.89	
4	Miriam Yutronic	Chile	37.84	
5	Ingeborg Mello	Argentina	37.22	
6	Ludmila Tisinova	Argentina	37.03	

=== Javelin throw ===
28 May – old model

Rank	Name	Nationality	Result	Notes
1st place, gold medalist(s)	Marlene Ahrens	Chile	42.85	
2nd place, silver medalist(s)	Mercedes García	Venezuela	37.45	
3rd place, bronze medalist(s)	Vera Trezoitko	Brazil	37.29	
4	Maria Ventura	Brazil	36.35	
5	Smiliana Dezulovic	Chile	34.63	
6	Magdalena García	Argentina	33.65	
