= Athletics at the 1971 Pan American Games – Men's 400 metres hurdles =

Men's 400 metres hurdles at the Pan American Games

The men's 400 metres hurdles event at the 1971 Pan American Games was held in Cali on 2 and 3 August.

== Medalists ==
Gold	Silver	Bronze
Ralph Mann; United States	Jim Seymour; United States	José Jacinto Hidalgo; Venezuela

== Results ==
=== Heats ===
Rank	Heat	Name	Nationality	Time	Notes
1	1	Ralph Mann	United States	51.77	Q
2	1	José Jacinto Hidalgo	Venezuela	51.89	Q
3	1	Juan Carlos Dyrzka	Argentina	51.93	Q
4	1	Francisco Dumeng	Puerto Rico	52.41	Q
5	1	Juan García	Cuba	52.70	
6	2	Miguel Olivera	Cuba	54.40	Q
7	1	Brock Aynsley	Canada	54.76	
8	2	Orominio Santaella	Puerto Rico	56.13	Q
9	2	Manuel Ruiz	Mexico	58.30	Q
10	2	Jim Seymour	United States	59.07	Q

=== Final ===
Rank	Name	Nationality	Time	Notes
1st place, gold medalist(s)	Ralph Mann	United States	49.10	GR
2nd place, silver medalist(s)	Jim Seymour	United States	50.36	
3rd place, bronze medalist(s)	José Jacinto Hidalgo	Venezuela	51.68	
4	Miguel Olivera	Cuba	52.05	
5	Juan Carlos Dyrzka	Argentina	52.13	
6	Orominio Santaella	Puerto Rico	53.50	
7	Francisco Dumeng	Puerto Rico	53.54	
8	Manuel Ruiz	Mexico	56.24	
