= Arístides Pineda =

Personal information
- Full name: Arístides de Jesús Pineda Boscán
- Born: August 10, 1940 (age 85) Santa Bárbara del Zulia, Venezuela

Sport
- Country: Venezuela
- Sport: Men's Athletics
- Event: 400 metres hurdles

Arístides de Jesús Pineda Boscán (born 10 August 1940) is a retired Venezuelan athlete who specialised in the 400 metres hurdles. He won multiple medals at regional level.

== International competitions ==
Year	Competition	Venue	Position	Event	Notes
Representing Venezuela
1960	Ibero-American Games	Santiago, Chile	11th (h)	400 m hurdles	56.9
1961	South American Championships	Lima, Peru	11th (sf)	400 m	53.1
1961	South American Championships	Lima, Peru	4th	400 m hurdles	54.6
1961	Bolivarian Games	Barranquilla, Colombia	3rd	400 m	50.3
1961	Bolivarian Games	Barranquilla, Colombia	2nd	400 m hurdles	55.1
1962	Central American and Caribbean Games	Kingston, Jamaica	4th	400 m hurdles	53.5
1962	Ibero-American Games	Madrid, Spain	5th	400 m hurdles	52.3
1962	Ibero-American Games	Madrid, Spain	1st	4 × 400 m relay	3:15.4
1963	Pan American Games	São Paulo, Brazil	3rd (h)	400 m hurdles	52.3
1963	Pan American Games	São Paulo, Brazil	2nd	4 × 400 m relay	3:12.20
1963	South American Championships	Cali, Colombia	6th	400 m	49.2
1963	South American Championships	Cali, Colombia	4th	400 m hurdles	52.2
1963	South American Championships	Cali, Colombia	1st	4 × 400 m relay	3:13.0
1965	South American Championships	Rio de Janeiro, Brazil	4th	400 m hurdles	53.6
1965	South American Championships	Rio de Janeiro, Brazil	1st	4 × 400 m relay	3:14.5
1965	Bolivarian Games	Quito, Ecuador	6th	400 m	55.1
1965	Bolivarian Games	Quito, Ecuador	1st	400 m hurdles	53.2
1965	Bolivarian Games	Quito, Ecuador	2nd	4 × 400 m relay	3:12.3
1966	Central American and Caribbean Games	San Juan, Puerto Rico	3rd	400 m hurdles	53.5
