= Athletics at the 1967 Pan American Games – Men's 3000 metres steeplechase =

Men's 3,000 metres steeplechase at the Pan American Games

The men's 3000 metres steeplechase event at the 1967 Pan American Games was held in Winnipeg on 30 July.

== Results ==
Rank	Name	Nationality	Time	Notes
1st place, gold medalist(s)	Chris McCubbins	United States	8:38.2	
2nd place, silver medalist(s)	Conrad Nightingale	United States	8:51.2	
3rd place, bronze medalist(s)	Domingo Amaisón	Argentina	8:55.0	
4	Héctor Villanueva	Mexico	9:00.6	
5	Flavio Buendía	Mexico	9:09.6	
6	Albertino Etchechury	Uruguay	9:13.0	
7	Hylke van der Wal	Canada	9:21.6	
8	Bruce Johnson	Canada	9:24.8	
9	Hernando Castro	Colombia	9:37.2	
	José Esteban Valle	Nicaragua	DNF	
