= Athletics at the 1967 Summer Universiade – Men's 110 metres hurdles =

The men's 110 metres hurdles event at the 1967 Summer Universiade was held at the National Olympic Stadium in Tokyo on 31 August and 1 September 1967.

== Medalists ==
Gold	Silver	Bronze
Eddy Ottoz; Italy	Ron Copeland; United States	Pierre Schoebel; France

== Results ==
=== Heats ===
Rank	Heat	Athlete	Nationality	Time	Notes
1	1	Eddy Ottoz	Italy	14.1	Q
2	1	Pierre Schoebel	France	14.7	Q
3	1	Carlos Mossa	Brazil	14.7	Q
4	1	Mal Baird	Australia	14.7	Q
5	1	Chikashi Watanabe	Japan	16.6	
1	2	Ron Copeland	United States	14.4	Q
2	2	Sergio Liani	Italy	14.4	Q
3	2	Hans Bickel	West Germany	14.4	Q
4	2	Takeya Nakatani	Japan	14.9	Q
5	2	Graham Gower	Great Britain	15.0	

=== Final ===
Wind: -0.3 m/s

Rank	Name	Nationality	Time	Notes
1st place, gold medalist(s)	Eddy Ottoz	Italy	13.9	
2nd place, silver medalist(s)	Ron Copeland	United States	14.0	
3rd place, bronze medalist(s)	Pierre Schoebel	France	14.3	
4	Carlos Mossa	Brazil	14.6	
5	Takeya Nakatani	Japan	14.7	
6	Hans Bickel	West Germany	14.8	
7	Sergio Liani	Italy	14.9	
8	Mal Baird	Australia	15.0	
