= Alicia Kaufmanas =

Argentine sprinter (born 1940)

Personal information
- Full name: Alicia Adela Kaufmanas
- Born: 20 December 1940 (age 85) Santa Fe, Argentina
- Height: 1.68 m (5 ft 6 in)
- Weight: 58 kg (128 lb)

Sport
- Sport: Sprinting
- Events: 100 metres, long jump

Alicia Adela Kaufmanas (born 20 December 1940) is a retired Argentine sprinter and long jumper. She competed in the women's 100 metres at the 1968 Summer Olympics.

== International competitions ==
| Year | Competition | Venue | Position | Event | Notes |
Representing Argentina
| 1961 | South American Championships | Lima, Peru | 2nd | 4 × 100 m relay | 48.9 s |
| 1961 | South American Championships | Lima, Peru | 3rd | Long jump | 5.21 m |
| 1963 | South American Championships | Cali, Colombia | 4th | Long jump | 5.26 m |
| 1964 | Olympic Games | Tokyo, Japan | 10th (h) | 4 × 100 m relay | 46.7 s |
| 1964 | Olympic Games | Tokyo, Japan | 30th (q) | Long jump | 5.29 m |
| 1965 | South American Championships | Rio de Janeiro, Brazil | 8th (h) | 80 m hurdles | 12.3 s |
| 1965 | South American Championships | Rio de Janeiro, Brazil | 2nd | 4 × 100 m relay | 47.9 s |
| 1965 | South American Championships | Rio de Janeiro, Brazil | 6th | High jump | 1.40 m |
| 1965 | South American Championships | Rio de Janeiro, Brazil | 2nd | Long jump | 5.38 m |
| 1967 | Pan American Games | Winnipeg, Canada | 7th | Long jump | 5.87 m |
| 1967 | South American Championships | Buenos Aires, Argentina | 4th | 100 m | 12.4 s |
| 1967 | South American Championships | Buenos Aires, Argentina | 3rd | 4 × 100 m relay | 48.5 s |
| 1967 | South American Championships | Buenos Aires, Argentina | 2nd | Long jump | 5.90 m |
| 1968 | Olympic Games | Mexico City, Mexico | 29th (h) | 100 m | 11.8 s |
| 1968 | Olympic Games | Mexico City, Mexico | 31st (h) | 200 m | 24.4 s |
| 1969 | South American Championships | Quito, Ecuador | 2nd | 4 × 100 m relay | 47.0 s |
| 1969 | South American Championships | Quito, Ecuador | 2nd | Long jump | 5.70 m |

== Personal bests ==
- 100 metres – 11.90 A (Mexico City 1968)
- 200 metres – 24.57 A (Mexico City 1968)
- Long jump – 6.15 (Santa Fe 1964)
