= Athletics at the 1963 Pan American Games – Women's long jump =

Women's long jump at the Pan American Games

The women's long jump event at the 1963 Pan American Games was held at the Pacaembu Stadium in São Paulo on 27 April.

== Results ==
Rank	Name	Nationality	Result	Notes
1st place, gold medalist(s)	Willye White	United States	6.15	
2nd place, silver medalist(s)	Iris dos Santos	Brazil	5.65	
3rd place, bronze medalist(s)	Edith McGuire	United States	5.48	
4	Gisela Vidal	Venezuela	5.42	
5	Irene Martínez	Cuba	5.39	
6	Dianne Gerace	Canada	5.25	
7	Patricia Callender	Barbados	5.17	
8	Joanne Rootsaert	Canada	5.07	
9	Edir Ribeiro	Brazil	5.02	
10	Patricia Watts	Trinidad and Tobago	4.79	
	Cristina Infante	Ecuador	DNS	
	Thora Best	Trinidad and Tobago	DNS	
