= Athletics at the 1965 Bolivarian Games =

Athletics at the V Bolivarian Games
- Host city: Quito, Ecuador
- Venue: Estadio Universitario
- Level: Senior
- Events: 30 (21 men, 9 women)
- Participation: 6 nations

Athletics competitions at the 1965 Bolivarian Games were held at the Estadio Universitario in Quito, Ecuador.

A detailed history of the early editions of the Bolivarian Games between 1938 and 1989 was published in a book written (in Spanish) by José Gamarra Zorrilla, former president of the Bolivian Olympic Committee, and first president (1976-1982) of ODESUR. Gold medal winners from Ecuador were published by the Comité Olímpico Ecuatoriano.

A total of 30 events were contested, 21 by men and 9 by women.

== Medal summary ==
Medal winners were published.

=== Men ===
Event	Gold		Silver		Bronze	
100 metres	Arquímedes Herrera (VEN)	10.4 A	Manuel Planchart (VEN)	10.7 A	Gerardo Di Tolla (PER)	10.7 A
200 metres	Pedro Grajales (COL)	20.9 A	Manuel Planchart (VEN)	21.2 A	Arquímedes Herrera (VEN)	21.5 A
400 metres	Pedro Grajales (COL)	46.9 A	Manuel Planchart (VEN)	47.7 A	Miguel Villacres (ECU)	48.0 A
800 metres	Hugo Burgos (COL)	1:52.3 A	Mario Zambrano (ECU)	1:55.7 A	Alejandro Arroyo (ECU)	1:56.7 A
1500 metres	Álvaro Mejía (COL)	3:57.2 A	Hugo Burgos (COL)	4:03.2 A	Mario Zambrano (ECU)	4:04.2 A
5000 metres	Álvaro Mejía (COL)	15:00.9 A	Manuel Cabrera (COL)	16:08.4 A	Fernando Sevilla (ECU)	16:20.6 A
10,000 metres	Álvaro Mejía (COL)	32:22.5 A	Manuel Cabrera (COL)	33:16.7 A	José Peredo (BOL)	34:03.6 A
Half marathon	Manuel Cabrera (COL)	1:11:14 A	Gustavo Gutiérrez (ECU)	1:12:25 A	Pedro Cárdenas (COL)	1:13:17 A
110 metres hurdles	Hernando Arrechea (COL)	14.5 A	Lancelot Bobb (VEN)	14.9 A	Juan Muñoz (VEN)	15.4 A
400 metres hurdles	Arístides Pineda (VEN)	53.2 A	Antonio Medina (VEN)	55.1 A	Jorge Almeida (ECU)	55.8 A
4 x 100 metres relay	Colombia; Ahumada; Miguel Carabacho; Tito Diago; Pedro Grajales	40.8 A	Panama; Sydney Dobbs; Gilberto Ansell; Fermín Garibaldi; Carl Edmund	41.6 A	Venezuela; Alberto Marchán; Horacio Estéves; Manuel Planchart; Arquímedes Herrera	41.6 A
4 x 400 metres relay	Colombia; Ahumada; Hugo Burgos; Migdonio Palacios; Pedro Grajales	3:09.4 A	Venezuela; Aristides Pineda; José Jacinto Hidalgo; Hortensio Fusil; Víctor Maldonado	3:12.3 A	Peru; Jorge Alemán; Humberto Reyes; Víctor Ibáñez; Jorge Canales	3:14.0 A
High jump	Roberto Abugattás (PER)	1.95 A	Oscar Canqui (PER)	1.90 A	Luis Planchart (VEN)	1.90 A
Pole vault	Parmenio Restrepo (COL)	4.10 A	César Quintero (COL)	4.10 A	Héctor Thomas (VEN)	4.10 A
Long jump	Héctor Thomas (VEN)	7.48 A	Juan Muñoz (VEN)	7.07 A	Roberto Caravaca (VEN)	6.93 A
Triple jump	Clevis Fuentes (VEN)	14.91 A	Iván Baldayo (VEN)	14.88 A	José López (VEN)	14.41 A
Shot put	Dagoberto González (COL)	14.75 A	Héctor Thomas (VEN)	14.12 A	Jaime Paz (ECU)	13.64 A
Discus throw	Dagoberto González (COL)	49.75 A	Héctor Thomas (VEN)	42.57 A	Wenceslao Lamas (ECU)	42.35 A
Hammer throw	Daniel Cereali (VEN)	51.89 A	Marcelino Borrero (COL)	51.18 A	Paul Hurtado (PER)	48.79 A
Javelin throw	Jesús Rodríguez (VEN)	62.62 A	Ramón Rodríguez (VEN)	61.99 A	Héctor Thomas (VEN)	60.56 A
Pentathlon	Héctor Thomas (VEN)	3376 A	Roberto Carbalo (VEN)	3262 A	Ramón Iriarte (VEN)	3075 A

=== Women ===
Event	Gold		Silver		Bronze	
100 metres	Sandra Sealy (PAN)	12.3 A	Omaira Villalobos (VEN)	12.5 A	Gisela Vidal (VEN)	12.5 A
200 metres	Sandra Sealy (PAN)	25.3 A	Gisela Vidal (VEN)	25.6 A	Fabiola Quiñónez (ECU)	26.1 A
80 metres hurdles	Gisela Vidal (VEN)	11.8 A	Elvira Quiñonez (ECU)	12.1 A	Gloria Aguirre (COL)	12.9 A
4 x 100 metres relay	Venezuela; Doris Rivas; Zaffis Aponte; Omaira Villalobos; Gisela Vidal	48.8 A	Colombia; Flor Blanca Umana; Elsy Rivas; Rocío Gallo; Gloria Aguirre	49.8 A	Ecuador; Hernández; Cristina Infante; Elvira Quiñónez; Fabiola Quiñónez	49.8 A
High jump	Julia Barrera (PER)	1.45 A	Flora Cosier (VEN)	1.45 A	Patricia Montero (PER)	1.45 A
Long jump	Gisela Vidal (VEN)	5.67 A	Omaira Villalobos (VEN)	5.47 A	Cristina Infante (ECU)	5.42 A
Shot put	Francisca Roberts (VEN)	12.26 A	María Luz Cabezas (ECU)	11.52 A	Delia Vera (PER)	11.46 A
Discus throw	Isolina Vergara (COL)	38.60 A	Beverly Eloisa Oglivie de James (PAN)	33.36 A	Patricia Andrus (VEN)	32.45 A
Javelin throw	Delia Vera (PER)	39.08 A	Flor Umaña (COL)	38.04 A	Patricia Andrus (VEN)	34.21 A

== Medal table (unofficial) ==
* Host nation (Ecuador)

Rank	Nation	Gold	Silver	Bronze	Total
1	Colombia (COL)	14	7	2	23
2	Venezuela (VEN)	11	16	12	39
3	Peru (PER)	3	1	5	9
4	Panama (PAN)	2	2	0	4
5	Ecuador (ECU)*	0	4	10	14
6	Bolivia (BOL)	0	0	1	1
Totals (6 entries)		30	30	30	90
