= Athletics at the 1967 Pan American Games – Women's long jump =

Women's long jump at the Pan American Games

The women's long jump event at the 1967 Pan American Games was held in Winnipeg on 2 August.

== Results ==
Rank	Name	Nationality	#1	#2	#3	#4	#5	#6	Result	Notes
1st place, gold medalist(s)	Irene Martínez	Cuba	6.12	6.14	6.33	x	5.74	6.11	6.33	
2nd place, silver medalist(s)	Gisela Vidal	Venezuela	5.94	x	5.99	x	x	6.20	6.20	NR
3rd place, bronze medalist(s)	Willye White	United States	6.17	6.04	6.15	x	6.15	4.70	6.17	
4	Martha Watson	United States	5.99	5.03	x	6.14	x	6.09	6.14	
5	Joan Hendry	Canada	x	6.11	5.90	5.94	5.85	6.08	6.11	
6	Marcia Garbey	Cuba	5.61	5.95	5.99	5.76	5.47	3.86	5.99	
7	Alicia Kaufmanas	Argentina	x	5.87	5.78				5.87	
8	Jenny Meldrum	Canada	5.74	5.85	x				5.85	
9	Mercedes Román	Mexico	5.38	5.41	5.47				5.47	
