= Athletics at the 1963 Summer Universiade – Women's long jump =

The women's long jump event at the 1963 Summer Universiade was held at the Estádio Olímpico Monumental in Porto Alegre in September 1963.

== Results ==
Rank	Athlete	Nationality	Result	Notes
1st place, gold medalist(s)	Tatyana Shchelkanova	Soviet Union	6.48	
2nd place, silver medalist(s)	Vlasta Přikrylová	Czechoslovakia	5.71	
3rd place, bronze medalist(s)	Bärbel Palmié	West Germany	5.63	
4	Irene Martínez	Cuba	5.43	
5	Norma Pérez	Cuba	4.87	
6	Astrid Hohne	Brazil	4.78	
