= Francisco Gutiérrez (sprinter) =

Colombian sprinter (born 1941)

Personal information
- Full name: Francisco J. Gutiérrez Hernández
- Nationality: Colombian
- Born: 3 December 1941 (age 84)
- Height: 1.75 m (5 ft 9 in)
- Weight: 70 kg (154 lb)

Sport
- Sport: Sprinting
- Event: 100 metres

Francisco J. Gutiérrez Hernández (born 3 December 1941) is a retired Colombian sprinter. He competed in the men's 100 metres at the 1964 Summer Olympics.

== International competitions ==
| Year | Competition | Venue | Position | Event | Notes |
Representing Colombia
| 1963 | South American Championships | Cali, Colombia | 11th (sf) | 100 m | 10.7 |
| 1963 | South American Championships | Cali, Colombia | 2nd | 4 × 100 m relay | 41.2 |
| 1964 | Olympic Games | Tokyo, Japan | 60th (h) | 100 m | 11.0 |
| 1964 | Olympic Games | Tokyo, Japan | 38th (h) | 200 m | 21.8 |
| 1965 | South American Championships | Rio de Janeiro, Brazil | 9th (sf) | 100 m | 11.0 |
| 1965 | South American Championships | Rio de Janeiro, Brazil | 8th (sf) | 200 m | 22.4 |
| 1965 | South American Championships | Rio de Janeiro, Brazil | 3rd | 4 × 100 m relay | 41.6 |
| 1965 | South American Championships | Rio de Janeiro, Brazil | 5th | 4 × 400 m relay | 3:17.8 |

== Personal bests ==
- 100 metres – 10.3h (1964)
- 200 metres – 21.1h (1964)
