= Cherrie Sherrard =

American track and field athlete

Personal information
- Born: Cherrie Mae Parish; August 25, 1938 (age 87) Dallas, Texas, U.S.
- Height: 5 ft 7 in (1.69 m)
- Weight: 141 lb (64 kg)
Medal record
Women's athletics
Representing the United States
Pan American Games
Gold medal – first place	1967 Winnipeg	80 m hurdles

Cherrie Sherrard (born Cherrie Mae Parish on August 25, 1938, in Dallas, Texas) is a track and field athlete from the United States. She competed at the 1964 Summer Olympics in the women's 80 m hurdles event. Sherrard earned a gold medal in the same event at the 1967 Pan American Games.

She is the mother of American former professional football player Mike Sherrard.
