= Víctor Maldonado =

Venezuelan hurdler (born 1939)

Personal information
- Full name: Víctor Maldonado Flores
- Born: August 3, 1939 (age 86) Lagunillas, Zulia, Venezuela
- Height: 1.83 m (6 ft 0 in)
- Weight: 63 kg (139 lb)

Sport
- Country: Venezuela
- Sport: Men's Athletics

Achievements and titles
- Olympic finals: 1960 Summer Olympics; 1964 Summer Olympics; 1968 Summer Olympics
Medal record
Men's Athletics
Representing Venezuela
Central American and Caribbean Games
Gold medal – first place	1962 Kingston	400m Hurdles
Silver medal – second place	1959 Caracas	400m Hurdles
Silver medal – second place	1966 San Juan	400m Hurdles
Bolivarian Games
Gold medal – first place	1961 Barranquilla	400m Hurdles
Gold medal – first place	1970 Maracaibo	400m Hurdles

Víctor Maldonado Flores (born August 3, 1939, in Lagunillas, Zulia) is a retired track and field athlete from Venezuela. He competed in the hurdling events. Maldonado represented his native country at three consecutive Summer Olympics, starting in 1960. He was second in the 1963 Pan American Games 4 × 400 metres relay (with Hortensio Fucil, Arístides Pineda and Leslie Mentor). In the 1959 Pan American Games, Maldonado finished sixth in the 400 metres hurdles and in the 1963 Pan American Games 400 metres hurdles he finished fourth.

== International competitions ==
Year	Competition	Venue	Position	Event	Notes
Representing Venezuela
1959	Central American and Caribbean Games	Caracas, Venezuela	3rd	110 m hurdles	16.05
1959	Central American and Caribbean Games	Caracas, Venezuela	2nd	400 m hurdles	54.18
1960	Olympic Games	Rome, Italy	22nd (h)	400 m hurdles	52.79
1961	Bolivarian Games	Barranquilla, Colombia	5th	400 m	48.5
1961	Bolivarian Games	Barranquilla, Colombia	1st	400 m hurdles	54.0
1962	Central American and Caribbean Games	Kingston, Jamaica	6th	400 m	49.5
1962	Central American and Caribbean Games	Kingston, Jamaica	1st	400 m hurdles	51.6
1962	Central American and Caribbean Games	Kingston, Jamaica	5th	4 × 400 m relay	3:19.1
1962	Ibero-American Games	Madrid, Spain	2nd	400 m hurdles	51.9
1962	Ibero-American Games	Madrid, Spain	1st	4 × 400 m relay	3:15.4
1963	Pan American Games	São Paulo, Brazil	4th	400 m hurdles	51.89
1963	Pan American Games	São Paulo, Brazil	2nd	4 × 400 m relay	3:12.20
1963	South American Championships	Cali, Colombia	3rd	400 m	48.5
1963	South American Championships	Cali, Colombia	2nd	400 m hurdles	51.5
1963	South American Championships	Cali, Colombia	1st	4 x 400 m relay	3:13.0
1964	Olympic Games	Tokyo, Japan	33rd (h)	400 m	47.7
1964	Olympic Games	Tokyo, Japan	13th (sf)	400 m hurdles	51.1
1965	South American Championships	Rio de Janeiro, Brazil	6th	200 m	22.5
1965	South American Championships	Rio de Janeiro, Brazil	2nd	400 m	47.5
1965	South American Championships	Rio de Janeiro, Brazil	1st	400 m hurdles	51.5
1965	South American Championships	Rio de Janeiro, Brazil	1st	4 × 400 m relay	3:14.5
1965	Bolivarian Games	Quito, Ecuador	2nd	4 × 400 m relay	3:12.3
1966	Central American and Caribbean Games	San Juan, Puerto Rico	7th (h)	400 m	48.1
1966	Central American and Caribbean Games	San Juan, Puerto Rico	2nd	400 m hurdles	52.5
1966	Central American and Caribbean Games	San Juan, Puerto Rico	4th	4 × 400 m relay	3:12.3
1968	Olympic Games	Mexico City, Mexico	16th (sf)	400 m hurdles	52.2
1968	Olympic Games	Mexico City, Mexico	13th (h)	4 × 400 m relay	3:07.65
1970	Bolivarian Games	Maracaibo, Venezuela	1st	400 m hurdles	51.0

== Personal bests ==
- 400 metres – 46.5h (1964)
- 400 metres hurdles – 51.0h (1970)
