= Vera Mossa =

Brazilian volleyball player (born 1964)

Personal information
- Full name: Vera Helena Bonetti Mossa
- Nationality: Brazilian
- Born: 27 September 1964 (age 62) Casa Branca, São Paulo (state)
- Height: 1.83 m (6 ft 0 in)
- Weight: 62 kg (137 lb)

Volleyball information
- Position: Outside hitter
- Number: 4

National team
- Years: Team
- 1980-1989: Brazil

Vera Helena Bonetti Mossa (born 27 September 1964) is a retired Brazilian female volleyball player. She was part of the Brazil women's national volleyball team at the 1980 Summer Olympics and 1988 Summer Olympics. She also competed at the 1986 FIVB Volleyball Women's World Championship.

== Biography ==
Mossa started playing volleyball when she was eight years old, supported by her parents, both physical education teachers. Her father Carlos Mossa was an athlete in the 1960s and a former Brazilian record holder in the 110 metres hurdles. In 1979, when she was 15 years old, she was drafted for the Brazilian national volleyball team to play in the 1980 Summer Olympics.

She played for the clubs Guarani (1976–1980), CA Pirelli (1981–1982), Supergasbras (1983–1989; with which she won the 1984/85 and 1985/86 Superliga). In 1990 Mossa moved to Italy, playing for Despar Perugia and Volley Sumirago. Back to Brazil, she played for Recra/Trasmontano (1995–97), Pinheiros (1998), Guarulhos (1999) and Minas Tênis (2000), where she finished her career.

== Personal life ==
After retiring from volleyball, Mossa became an entrepreneur and opened several businesses in the city of Campinas.

She married then volleyball player and current coach Bernardo Rezende (Bernardinho), from 1985 to 1994. From that relationship, she had the future volleyball player Bruno Rezende. Currently she is in her third marriage.

Mossa participated of the 1985 film Rock Estrela, directed by Lael Rodrigues.
