= Ricardo Vidal (athlete) =

Chilean long-distance runner (1930-2010)

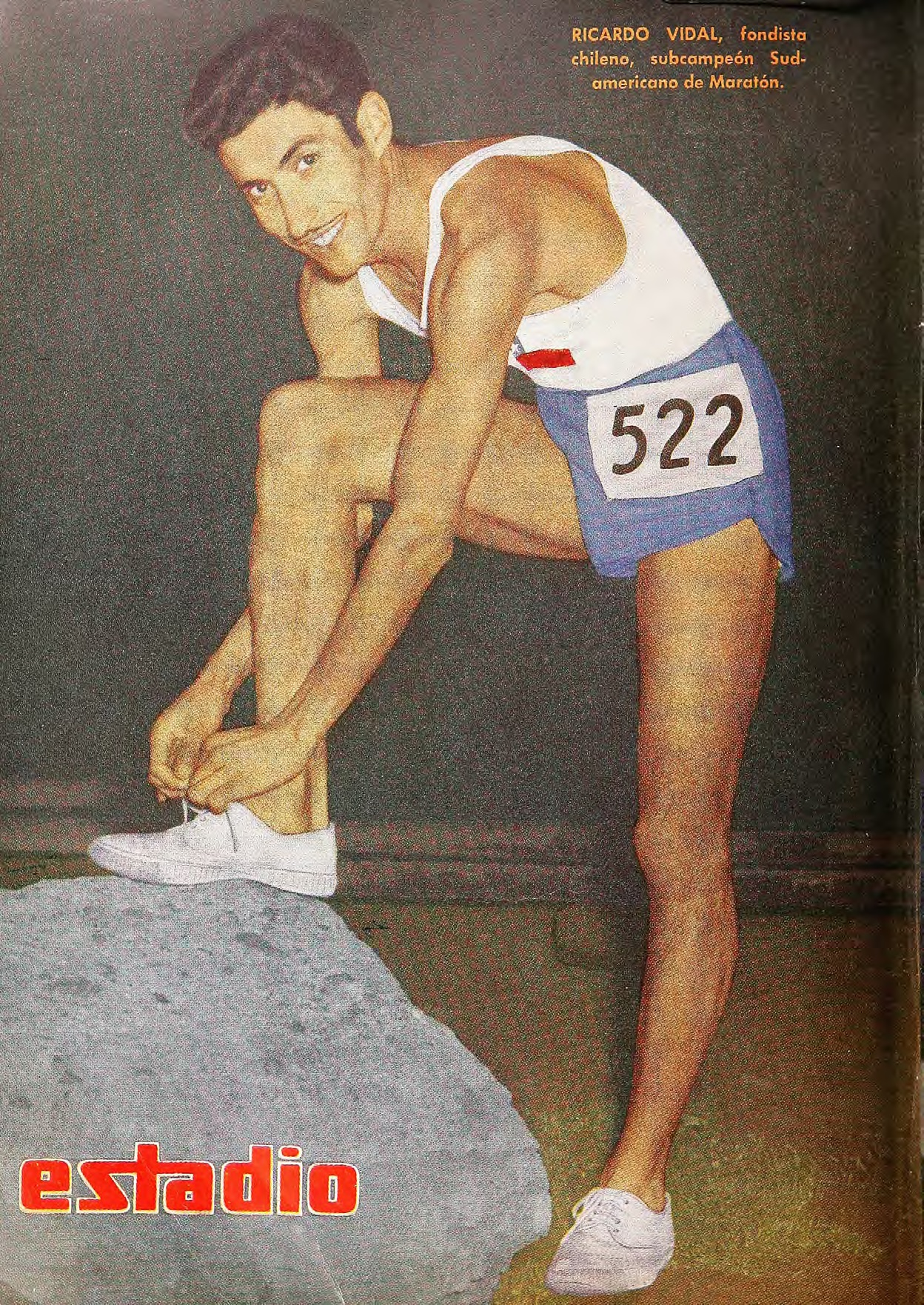

Personal information
- Full name: Héctor Ricardo Vidal Brisso
- Nationality: Chilean
- Born: 9 October 1930
- Died: 10 March 2010 (aged 79)
- Height: 1.83 m (6 ft 0 in)
- Weight: 71 kg (157 lb)

Sport
- Sport: Long-distance running
- Event: Marathon

Héctor Ricardo Vidal Brisso (9 October 1930 – 10 March 2010) was a Chilean long-distance runner. He competed in the marathon at the 1964 Summer Olympics.

== International competitions ==
Year	Competition	Venue	Position	Event	Notes
Representing Chile
1952	South American Championships	Buenos Aires, Argentina	4th	800 m	1:55.7
1952	South American Championships	Buenos Aires, Argentina	5th	1500 m	4:02.1
1953	South American Championships (unofficial)	Santiago, Chile	4th	1500 m	4:03.8
1958	South American Championships	Montevideo, Uruguay	4th	1500 m	3:53.5
1959	South American Championships (unofficial)	São Paulo, Brazil	2nd	5000 m	15:06.2
1959	Pan American Games	Chicago, United States	9th	1500 m	NT
1959	Pan American Games	Chicago, United States	8th	5000 m	NT
1959	Pan American Games	Chicago, United States	7th	10,000 m	31:35.7
1960	Ibero-American Games	Santiago, Chile	6th	1500 m	3:58.6
1960	Ibero-American Games	Santiago, Chile	5th	5000 m	15:05.6
1961	South American Championships	Lima, Peru	4th	1500 m	3:55.5
1961	South American Championships	Lima, Peru	6th	10,000 m	32:21.7
1961	South American Championships	Lima, Peru	2nd	Marathon	2:41:16
1962	Ibero-American Games	Madrid, Spain	7th	10,000 m	31:59.8
1962	Ibero-American Games	Madrid, Spain	6th	Marathon	2:40:07
1963	Pan American Games	São Paulo, Brazil	6th	5000 m	14:40.87
1963	Pan American Games	São Paulo, Brazil	6th	10,000 m	31:54.57
1963	Pan American Games	São Paulo, Brazil	–	Marathon	DNF
1964	Olympic Games	Tokyo, Japan	30th	Marathon	2:28:01.6
1965	South American Championships	Rio de Janeiro, Brazil	3rd	5000 m	14:53.8
1965	South American Championships	Rio de Janeiro, Brazil	3rd	10,000 m	32:11.0
1965	South American Championships	Rio de Janeiro, Brazil	1st	Marathon	2:38:15

== Personal bests ==
- 1500 metres – 3:53.5h (Montevideo 1958)
- 5000 metres – 14:53.5h
- 10,000 metres – 30:51.6h (1962)
- Marathon – 2:28:02 (1964)
