= 1964 South American Junior Championships in Athletics =

V South American Junior Championships in Athletics
- Dates: September 24–27
- Host city: Santiago, Chile
- Level: U20
- Events: 19
- Participation: about 80 athletes from 7 nations

The fifth South American Junior Championships in Athletics were held in Santiago, Chile from September 24–27, 1964.

== Participation (unofficial) ==
Detailed result lists can be found on the "World Junior Athletics History" website. An unofficial count yields the number of about 80 athletes from about 7 countries: Argentina (20), Brazil (10), Chile (18), Ecuador (2), Peru (8), Uruguay (6), Venezuela (16).

== Medal summary ==
Medal winners are published.

Complete results can be found on the "World Junior Athletics History" website.

=== Men ===
Event	Gold		Silver		Bronze	
100 metres	Araken da Costa (BRA)	10.5	Manuel Planchart (VEN)	10.6	Germán Oliva (ARG)	10.8
200 metres	Andrés Calonge (ARG)	21.5	Germán Oliva (ARG)	21.7	Manuel Planchart (VEN)	21.8
400 metres	Andrés Calonge (ARG)	48.7	José Hidalgo (VEN)	48.9	Adjalme de Carvalho (BRA)	49.1
800 metres	Adjalme de Carvalho (BRA)	1:55.3	Jorge Grosser (CHI)	1:56.4	José Hidalgo (VEN)	1:56.5
1500 metres	Jorge Grosser (CHI)	4:06.7	Armando Díaz (VEN)	4:09.2	Homero Arce (CHI)	4:10.0
3000 metres	Carlos Loto (ARG)	9:04.6	Paulo Fujinaga (BRA)	9:09.6	Julio Maneiro (URU)	9:13.4
110 metres hurdles	Jaime Davis (VEN)	15.3	Fernando Moreno (CHI)	15.7	Marcelo Moreno (CHI)	16.0
400 metres hurdles	Adjalme de Carvalho (BRA)	54.8	Santiago Brumel (CHI)	55.2	Jorge Almeida (ECU)	57.6
4 × 100 metres relay	Argentina; Irigoyen; Andrés Calonge; Félix Krzyszcha; Germán Oliva	41.4	Chile; Marcelo Moreno; Fernando Moreno; Benedicto Rojas; Eduardo Boetsch	41.8	Brazil ? ? ? Araken da Costa	42.2
4 × 400 metres relay	Argentina; M. Garcia; Irigoyen; Carlos Nestor Heuchert; Andrés Calonje	3:19.8	Venezuela; Gustavo Navarro; José Jacinto Hidalgo; Manuel Planchart; Julio Castillo	3:21.2	Chile; Eduardo Martín; Cifuentes; Jorge Grosser; Juan Carlos Ruz	3:23.2
High jump	Roberto Possi (ARG)	1.96	Cristián Errazuris (CHI)	1.93	Carlos Colchado (PER)	1.85
Pole vault	Hugo Argat (ARG)	3.85	Gonzalo Fermín (VEN)	3.70	Armando Frías (CHI)	3.60
Long jump	Araken da Costa (BRA)	7.49	Peter Junge (CHI)	7.11	Alfredo Boncagni (ARG)	6.95
Triple jump	Admilson Chitarra (BRA)	13.77	Mario Madrid (VEN)	13.65	Aldo Beldruno (ARG)	13.65
Shot put	José Jacques (BRA)	16.56	Álvaro Zucchi (BRA)	15.90	Darwin Piñeyrúa (URU)	14.22
Discus throw	José Jacques (BRA)	43.39	Felipe Planillas (URU)	39.25	Juan Sandoval (ARG)	38.06
Hammer throw	Carlos Gatica (ARG)	49.76	Jorge Pennachioni (ARG)	49.14	Oswaldo Guaita (CHI)	49.12
Javelin throw	Álvaro Zucchi (BRA)	62.11	Rolf Hope (CHI)	60.62	Werner Klötzer (CHI)	55.66
Pentathlon	Pedro Alexander (VEN)	2622	Peter Junge (CHI)	2542	Ramón Iriarte (VEN)	2348

== Medal table (unofficial) ==
* Host nation (Chile)

Rank	Nation	Gold	Silver	Bronze	Total
1	Argentina (ARG)	8	2	4	14
2	Brazil (BRA)	8	2	2	12
3	Venezuela (VEN)	2	6	3	11
4	Chile (CHI)*	1	8	6	15
5	Uruguay (URU)	0	1	2	3
6	Ecuador (ECU)	0	0	1	1
6	Peru (PER)	0	0	1	1
Totals (7 entries)		19	19	19	57
