= Athletics at the 1963 Pan American Games – Men's 3000 metres steeplechase =

Men's 3,000 metres steeplechase at the Pan American Games

The men's 3000 metres steeplechase event at the 1963 Pan American Games was held at the Pacaembu Stadium in São Paulo on 30 April.

== Results ==
Rank	Name	Nationality	Time	Notes
1st place, gold medalist(s)	Jeff Fishback	United States	9:07.9	
2nd place, silver medalist(s)	Sebastião Mendes	Brazil	9:12.8	
3rd place, bronze medalist(s)	Albertino Etchechury	Uruguay	9:17.3	
4	Alberto Ríos	Argentina	9:32.0	
5	Antonio de Azevedo	Brazil	9:42.4	
	Francisco Allen	Chile	DNS	
	George Young	United States	DNS	
