= Domingo Amaizón =

Argentine middle-distance runner (born 1936)

Personal information
- Full name: Domingo Amaizón Mastroianni
- Born: 22 April 1936 (age 90) Córdoba, Argentina
- Height: 1.74 m (5 ft 9 in)
- Weight: 60 kg (132 lb)

Sport
- Sport: Middle-distance running
- Event: Steeplechase

Domingo Amaizón Mastroianni (born 22 April 1936) is a retired Argentine middle-distance runner. He competed in the men's 3000 metres steeplechase at the 1968 Summer Olympics.

== International competitions ==
Year	Competition	Venue	Position	Event	Notes
Representing Argentina
1959	South American Championships (unofficial)	São Paulo, Brazil	6th	3000 m s'chase	9:23.9
1959	Pan American Games	Chicago, United States	7th	5000 m	15:03.0
1959	Pan American Games	Chicago, United States	8th	3000 m s'chase	NT
1960	Ibero-American Games	Santiago, Chile	10th (h)	1500 m	4:01.5
1960	Ibero-American Games	Santiago, Chile	?	3000 m s'chase	NT
1961	South American Championships	Lima, Peru	5th	1500 m	3:56.3
1961	South American Championships	Lima, Peru	2nd	3000 m s'chase	9:20.6
1962	Ibero-American Games	Madrid, Spain	4th	5000 m	14:44.6
1962	Ibero-American Games	Madrid, Spain	1st	3000 m s'chase	9:02.6
1963	South American Championships	Cali, Colombia	3rd	5000 m	15:01.2
1963	South American Championships	Cali, Colombia	2nd	10,000 m	31:17.0
1963	South American Championships	Cali, Colombia	1st	3000 m s'chase	9:13.0
1965	South American Championships	Rio de Janeiro, Brazil	3rd	1500 m	3:54.5
1965	South American Championships	Rio de Janeiro, Brazil	1st	5000 m	14:46.5
1965	South American Championships	Rio de Janeiro, Brazil	2nd	10,000 m	32:01.0
1965	South American Championships	Rio de Janeiro, Brazil	1st	3000 m s'chase	9:03.0
1967	Pan American Games	Winnipeg, Canada	3rd	3000 m s'chase	8:55.0
1967	South American Championships	Buenos Aires, Argentina	1st	3000 m s'chase	9:04.8
1968	Olympic Games	Mexico City, Mexico	32nd (h)	3000 m s'chase	9:43.06

== Personal bests ==
Outdoor

- 1500 metres – 3:47.8h (Madrid 1968) former NR
- 3000 metres – 8:14.0h (Mainz 1964)
- 5000 metres – 14:11.0h (Turku 1964)
- 10,000 metres – 30:08.2h (Buenos Aires 1972)
- 3000 metres steeplechase – 8:41.8h (La Coruña 1968) former NR

Indoor

- 1500 metres – 3:58.9h (Madrid 1973)
- 3000 metres – 8:24.6h (Madrid 1973)
