= Manuel Planchart =

Venezuelan sprinter (born 1942)

Personal information
- Nationality: Venezuelan
- Born: 4 October 1942 (age 83) Zaraza, Venezuela
- Height: 1.74 m (5 ft 9 in)
- Weight: 70 kg (154 lb)

Sport
- Sport: Sprinting
- Event: 100 metres

Manuel Planchart (born 4 October 1942) is a Venezuelan sprinter. He competed in the men's 100 metres at the 1968 Summer Olympics.

Planchart competed in the 1962 Central American and Caribbean Games, and he won seven medals at the 1964 South American Junior Championships in Athletics, 1965 South American Championships in Athletics, and in athletics at the 1965 Bolivarian Games.

== International competitions ==
Year	Competition	Venue	Position	Event	Notes
Representing Venezuela
1964	South American Junior Championships	Santiago, Chile	2nd	100 m	10.6
1964	South American Junior Championships	Santiago, Chile	3rd	200 m	21.8
1964	South American Junior Championships	Santiago, Chile	2nd	4 × 400 m relay	3:21.2
1965	South American Championships	Rio de Janeiro, Brazil	3rd	100 m	10.7
1965	South American Championships	Rio de Janeiro, Brazil	4th	200 m	22.0
1965	South American Championships	Rio de Janeiro, Brazil	2nd	4 × 100 m relay	41.3
1965	Bolivarian Games	Quito, Ecuador	2nd	100 m	10.7
1965	Bolivarian Games	Quito, Ecuador	2nd	200 m	21.2
1965	Bolivarian Games	Quito, Ecuador	2nd	400 m	47.7
1965	Bolivarian Games	Quito, Ecuador	3rd	4 × 100 m relay	41.6
1966	Central American and Caribbean Games	San Juan, Puerto Rico	4th (sf)	100 m	10.5^{1}
1968	Olympic Games	Mexico City, Mexico	57th (h)	100 m	10.80
1973	Bolivarian Games	Panama City, Panama	9th	200 m	21.9

^{1}Did not start in the final

== Personal bests ==
- 100 metres – 10.2h (1965)
