= Albertino Etchechury =

Uruguayan middle-distance runner (born 1936)

Personal information
- Born: 12 July 1936 (age 90) Rivera, Uruguay
- Height: 1.68 m (5 ft 6 in)
- Weight: 62 kg (137 lb)

Sport
- Sport: Middle-distance running
- Event: Steeplechase

Albertino Etchechury (born 12 July 1936) is a Uruguayan middle-distance runner. He competed in the men's 3000 metres steeplechase at the 1968 Summer Olympics.

== International competitions ==
Year	Competition	Venue	Position	Event	Notes
Representing Uruguay
1960	Ibero-American Games	Santiago, Chile	?	5000 m	NT
1960	Ibero-American Games	Santiago, Chile	?	3000 m s'chase	NT
1962	Ibero-American Games	Madrid, Spain	7th	5000 m	15:45.0
1962	Ibero-American Games	Madrid, Spain	?	10,000 m	NT
1962	Ibero-American Games	Madrid, Spain	7th	3000 m s'chase	9:59.4
1963	Pan American Games	São Paulo, Brazil	6th	1500 m	4:02.18
1963	Pan American Games	São Paulo, Brazil	8th	5000 m	15:11.76
1963	Pan American Games	São Paulo, Brazil	3rd	3000 m s'chase	9:17.3
1963	South American Championships	Cali, Colombia	7th	3000 m s'chase	9:46.6
1965	South American Championships	Rio de Janeiro, Brazil	2nd	1500 m	3:54.1
1965	South American Championships	Rio de Janeiro, Brazil	2nd	3000 m s'chase	9:07.5
1967	Pan American Games	Winnipeg, Canada	6th	3000 m s'chase	9:13.0
1967	South American Championships	Buenos Aires, Argentina	4th (h)	800 m	1:55.4
1967	South American Championships	Buenos Aires, Argentina	3rd	1500 m	3:56.8
1967	South American Championships	Buenos Aires, Argentina	?	5000 m	NT
1967	South American Championships	Buenos Aires, Argentina	2nd	3000 m s'chase	9:16.0
1968	Olympic Games	Mexico City, Mexico	30th (h)	3000 m s'chase	9:35.61
1971	South American Championships	Lima, Peru	6th	3000 m s'chase	9:25.2

== Personal bests ==
- 3000 metres steeplechase – 9:05.7 (1968)
