= Juan Carlos Dyrzka =

Argentine hurdler (1941–2012)

Juan Dyrzka
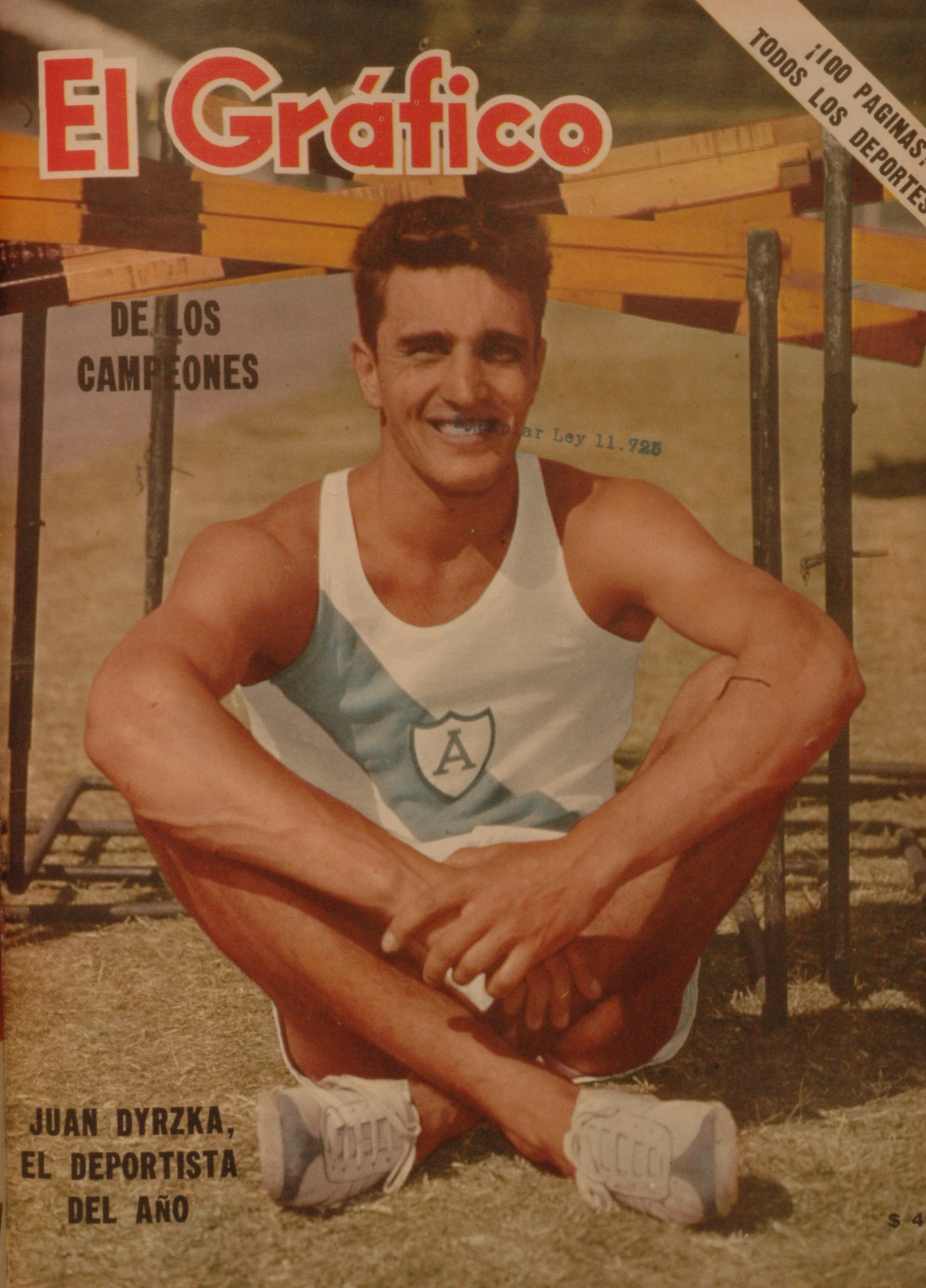

Personal information
- Full name: Juan Carlos Pablo Dyrzka
- Born: 24 March 1941 Buenos Aires, Argentina
- Died: 26 June 2012 (aged 71) Buenos Aires, Argentina
- Height: 180 cm (5 ft 11 in)
- Weight: 77 kg (170 lb)
Medal record
Men's Athletics
Representing Argentina
Ibero American Games
Gold medal – first place	1960 Santiago	400 m hurdles
Pan American Games
Gold medal – first place	1963 São Paulo	400 m hurdles

Juan Carlos Pablo Dyrzka (24 March 1941 in Buenos Aires – 26 June 2012) was an Argentine hurdler who competed in the 1964 Summer Olympics and in the 1968 Summer Olympics.

His younger sister Emilia Dyrzka was also an athlete.

== International competitions ==
Year	Competition	Venue	Position	Event	Notes
Representing Argentina
1959	South American Junior Championships	Buenos Aires, Argentina	4th	200 m	23.5
1959	South American Junior Championships	Buenos Aires, Argentina	2nd	400 m	51.7
1959	South American Junior Championships	Buenos Aires, Argentina	1st	110 m hurdles	16.0
1959	South American Junior Championships	Buenos Aires, Argentina	2nd	Medley relay	2:03.4
1959	South American Championships (unofficial)	São Paulo, Brazil	5th	400 m	54.9
1959	South American Championships (unofficial)	São Paulo, Brazil	4th	400 m hurdles	57.1
1960	South American Junior Championships	Santiago, Chile	1st	400 m	49.3
1960	South American Junior Championships	Santiago, Chile	1st	110 m hurdles	15.3
1960	South American Junior Championships	Santiago, Chile	1st	400 m hurdles	54.6
1960	South American Junior Championships	Santiago, Chile	1st	4 × 400 m relay	3:21.5
1960	Ibero-American Games	Santiago, Chile	5th	110 m hurdles	15.2
1960	Ibero-American Games	Santiago, Chile	1st	400 m hurdles	52.8
1960	Ibero-American Games	Santiago, Chile	5th	4 × 400 m relay	3:18.5
1961	South American Championships	Lima, Peru	2nd	400 m	49.3
1961	South American Championships	Lima, Peru	4th (h)	110 m hurdles	15.2
1961	South American Championships	Lima, Peru	1st	400 m hurdles	52.3
1961	South American Championships	Lima, Peru	2nd	4 × 400 m relay	3:16.9
1962	Ibero-American Games	Madrid, Spain	2nd	400 m	48.1
1962	Ibero-American Games	Madrid, Spain	11th (h)	110 m hurdles	50.9
1962	Ibero-American Games	Madrid, Spain	1st	400 m hurdles	50.9
1962	Ibero-American Games	Madrid, Spain	4th (h)	4 × 400 m relay	3:21.0
1963	Pan American Games	São Paulo, Brazil	8th (h)	110 m hurdles	14.93
1963	Pan American Games	São Paulo, Brazil	1st	400 m hurdles	50.32
1963	South American Championships	Cali, Colombia	2nd	400 m	47.6
1963	South American Championships	Cali, Colombia	1st	400 m hurdles	51.0
1963	South American Championships	Cali, Colombia	3rd	4 × 100 m relay	41.6
1963	South American Championships	Cali, Colombia	3rd	4 × 400 m relay	3:15.3
1964	Olympic Games	Tokyo, Japan	40th (h)	400 m	48.3
1964	Olympic Games	Tokyo, Japan	34th (h)	110 m hurdles	15.2
1964	Olympic Games	Tokyo, Japan	15th (sf)	400 m hurdles	53.1
1965	South American Championships	Rio de Janeiro, Brazil	20th (h)	200 m	23.7
1965	South American Championships	Rio de Janeiro, Brazil	4th	110 m hurdles	15.8
1965	South American Championships	Rio de Janeiro, Brazil	2nd	400 m hurdles	52.0
1965	South American Championships	Rio de Janeiro, Brazil	3rd	4 × 400 m relay	3:17.3
1967	Pan American Games	Winnipeg, Canada	5th	400 m hurdles	52.00
1967	South American Championships	Buenos Aires, Argentina	3rd	110 m hurdles	14.8
1967	South American Championships	Buenos Aires, Argentina	2nd	400 m hurdles	52.3
1968	Olympic Games	Mexico City, Mexico	28th (qf)	400 m	46.85
1968	Olympic Games	Mexico City, Mexico	10th (sf)	400 m hurdles	49.8
1969	South American Championships	Quito, Ecuador	4th	110 m hurdles	15.2
1969	South American Championships	Quito, Ecuador	1st	400 m hurdles	52.0
1969	South American Championships	Quito, Ecuador	5th	4 × 100 m relay	42.2
1969	South American Championships	Quito, Ecuador	1st	4 × 400 m relay	3:12.3
1971	Pan American Games	Cali, Colombia	5th	400 m hurdles	52.13
1971	Pan American Games	Cali, Colombia	8th	4 × 100 m relay	41.50
1971	Pan American Games	Cali, Colombia	5th (h)	4 × 400 m relay	3:11.1
1971	South American Championships	Lima, Peru	8th (h)	110 m hurdles	15.8
1971	South American Championships	Lima, Peru	1st	400 m hurdles	52.4
1971	South American Championships	Lima, Peru	2nd	4 × 400 m relay	3:15.8
1975	South American Championships	Rio de Janeiro, Brazil	6th	400 m hurdles	53.3

== Personal bests ==
Outdoor

- 200 metres – 21.6 (Buenos Aires 1963)
- 400 metres – 46.85 A (Mexico City 1968)
- 800 metres – 1:52.2 (Buenos Aires 1968)
- 110 metres hurdles – 14.93 (NWI, São Paulo 1963)
- 400 metres hurdles – 49.82 A (Mexico City 1968)
