= Athletics at the 1963 Pan American Games – Men's 5000 metres =

Men's 5000 metres at the Pan American Games

The men's 5000 metres event at the 1963 Pan American Games was held at the Pacaembu Stadium in São Paulo on 27 April.

== Results ==
Rank	Name	Nationality	Time	Notes
1st place, gold medalist(s)	Osvaldo Suárez	Argentina	14:25.81	
2nd place, silver medalist(s)	Charley Clark	United States	14:27.16	
3rd place, bronze medalist(s)	Bob Schul	United States	14:29.21	
4	Doug Kyle	Canada	14:30.80	
5	Eligio Galicia	Mexico	14:37.81	
6	Ricardo Vidal	Chile	14:40.87	
7	Alberto Ríos	Argentina	15:03.77	
8	Albertino Etchechury	Uruguay	15:11.76	
9	José Silva	Brazil	15:29.03	
10	Antonio de Azevedo	Brazil	15:50.74	
