= Carlos Mossa =

Brazilian athlete (born 1939)

Personal information
- Full name: Carlos Luiz Mossa
- Born: 18 July 1939 (age 86)

Sport
- Sport: Athletics
- Event: 110 metres hurdles

Carlos Luiz Mossa (born 18 July 1939) is a retired Brazilian athlete who competed in the sprint hurdles. He has won several medals at continental level.

His daughter Vera Mossa and his grandsons Bruno Rezende and João Gabriel Mossa were notable volleyball players.

His personal best in the event is 14.1h set in São Paulo in 1961. This is a former national record.

== International competitions ==
Year	Competition	Venue	Position	Event	Notes
Representing Brazil
1959	Universiade	Turin, Italy	5th	110 m hurdles	14.7
1960	Ibero-American Games	Santiago, Chile	3rd	110 m hurdles	14.4
1961	South American Championships	Lima, Peru	1st	110 m hurdles	14.5
1962	Ibero-American Games	Madrid, Spain	2nd	110 m hurdles	14.8
1962	Ibero-American Games	Madrid, Spain	9th	Long jump	6.98 m
1963	Pan American Games	São Paulo, Brazil	5th	110 m hurdles	16.5
1963	Pan American Games	São Paulo, Brazil	4th	4 × 400 m relay	3:17.1
1963	Universiade	Porto Alegre, Brazil	8th (h)	110 m hurdles	14.85
1963	Universiade	Porto Alegre, Brazil	–	4 × 100 m relay	DNF
1965	South American Championships	Rio de Janeiro, Brazil	1st	110 m hurdles	15.2
1967	Universiade	Tokyo, Japan	4th	110 m hurdles	14.6
1967	Universiade	Tokyo, Japan	7th	4 × 100 m relay	42.0
1967	South American Championships	Buenos Aires, Argentina	2nd	110 m hurdles	14.7
1967	South American Championships	Buenos Aires, Argentina	8th	Long jump	6.51 m
1969	South American Championships	Quito, Ecuador	5th	110 m hurdles	15.2
