= Rolf Hoppe (athlete) =

Chilean athlete

Personal information
- Born: 18 March 1945 Santiago, Chile
- Died: 22 December 1969 (aged 24) Los Angeles, California
- Height: 1.83 m (6 ft 0 in)
- Weight: 83 kg (183 lb)

Sport
- Sport: Athletics
- Event: Javelin throw

Rolf Hoppe (18 March 1945 – 22 December 1969) was a Chilean athlete. He competed in the men's javelin throw at the 1968 Summer Olympics.

His personal best with the old model of javelin was 76.36 metres set in 1969.

== International competitions ==
Year	Competition	Venue	Position	Event	Notes
Representing Chile
1964	South American Junior Championships	Santiago, Chile	2nd	Javelin throw (old)	60.62 m
1967	South American Championships	Buenos Aires, Argentina	7th	Javelin throw (old)	56.50 m
1968	Olympic Games	Mexico City, Mexico	24th (q)	Javelin throw (old)	68.32 m
1969	South American Championships	Quito, Ecuador	1st	Javelin throw (old)	69.76 m
