= Athletics at the 1959 Pan American Games – Men's 5000 metres =

Men's 5000 metres at the Pan American Games

The men's 5000 metres event at the 1959 Pan American Games was held at the Soldier Field in Chicago on 30 August.

== Results ==
Rank	Name	Nationality	Time	Notes
1st place, gold medalist(s)	Bill Dellinger	United States	14:28.4	
2nd place, silver medalist(s)	Osvaldo Suárez	Argentina	14:28.5	
3rd place, bronze medalist(s)	Doug Kyle	Canada	14:33.0	
4	Alfredo Tinoco	Mexico	14:43.8	
5	George De Peana	British Guiana	14:57.0	
6	Eligio Galicia	Mexico	??:??.?	
7	Domingo Amaizón	Argentina	15:03.0	
8	Ricardo Vidal	Chile	??:??.?	
9	Guadelupe Jiménez	Mexico	??:??.?	
10	Luis Bocanegra	Argentina	??:??.?	
11	Lew Steiglitz	United States	??:??.?	
12	Jesús Queche	Guatemala	??:??.?	
	Max Truex	United States	DNF	
	Ron Wallingford	Canada	DNF	
	Henry Glyde	Canada	DNF	
