= José Jacinto Hidalgo =

Venezuelan sprinter (1943–2020)

Personal information
- Born: 4 January 1943 Quiriquire, Punceres, Venezuela
- Died: 22 May 2020 (aged 77) Mayagüez, Puerto Rico
- Height: 1.78 m (5 ft 10 in)
- Weight: 68 kg (150 lb)

Sport
- Sport: Sprinting
- Event: 400 metres

José Jacinto Hidalgo (4 January 1943 – 22 May 2020) was a Venezuelan sprinter. He competed in the men's 400 metres at the 1968 Summer Olympics.

== International competitions ==
Year	Competition	Venue	Position	Event	Notes
Representing Venezuela
1964	South American Junior Championships	Santiago, Chile	2nd	400 m	48.9
1964	South American Junior Championships	Santiago, Chile	3rd	800 m	1:56.5
1964	South American Junior Championships	Santiago, Chile	2nd	4 x 400 m relay	3:21.2
1965	South American Championships	Rio de Janeiro, Brazil	6th	400 m	49.1
1965	South American Championships	Rio de Janeiro, Brazil	1st	4 x 400 m relay	3:14.5
1965	Bolivarian Games	Quito, Ecuador	2nd	4 x 400 m relay	3:12.3
1966	Central American and Caribbean Games	San Juan, Puerto Rico	6th (sf)	400 m	47.5
1966	Central American and Caribbean Games	San Juan, Puerto Rico	4th	4 × 400 m relay	3:12.3
1968	Olympic Games	Mexico City, Mexico	21st (h)	400 m	46.32
1968	Olympic Games	Mexico City, Mexico	13th (h)	4 × 400 metres relay	3:07.65
1971	Central American and Caribbean Championships	Kingston, Jamaica	6th	400 m hurdles	55.2
1971	Pan American Games	Cali, Colombia	3rd	400 m hurdles	51.68
1971	Pan American Games	Cali, Colombia	7th	4 × 400 metres relay	3:08.9
1972	Olympic Games	Munich, West Germany	33rd (h)	400 m hurdles	54.00
1972	Olympic Games	Munich, West Germany	14th (h)	4 × 400 metres relay	3:06.99

== Personal bests ==
- 400 metres – 46.32 (1968)
- 400 metres hurdles – 51.2h (1972)
