= José Cavero =

Peruvian hurdler (born 1940)

Personal information
- Nationality: Peruvian
- Born: 16 August 1940 (age 85)
- Height: 1.68 m (5 ft 6 in)
- Weight: 71 kg (157 lb)

Sport
- Sport: Track and field
- Event: 400 metres hurdles

José Cavero Samillan (born 16 August 1940) is a Peruvian hurdler. He competed in the men's 400 metres hurdles at the 1964 Summer Olympics.

His personal best in the event is 52.1 seconds set in 1963.

== International competitions ==
Year	Competition	Venue	Position	Event	Notes
Representing Peru
1960	South American Junior Championships	Santiago, Chile	2nd	110 m hurdles	15.7
1960	South American Junior Championships	Santiago, Chile	2nd	400 m hurdles	55.3
1960	South American Junior Championships	Santiago, Chile	2nd	4 × 400 m relay	3:24.3
1960	Ibero-American Games	Santiago, Chile	– (h)	110 metres hurdles	DQ
1960	Ibero-American Games	Santiago, Chile	5th	400 metres hurdles	54.9
1960	Ibero-American Games	Santiago, Chile	7th (h)	4 × 400 m relay	3:20.6
1961	South American Championships	Lima, Peru	6th	110 m hurdles	15.9
1961	South American Championships	Lima, Peru	5th	400 m hurdles	54.6
1961	South American Championships	Lima, Peru	4th	4 × 400 m relay	3:22.7
1962	Ibero-American Games	Madrid, Spain	3rd (h)	400 m hurdles	53.9
1963	Pan American Games	São Paulo, Brazil	6th	400 m hurdles	53.10
1963	South American Championships	Cali, Colombia	7th (h)	110 m hurdles	15.6
1963	South American Championships	Cali, Colombia	4th	400 m hurdles	52.1
1963	South American Championships	Cali, Colombia	5th	4 × 400 m relay	3:20.1
1963	Universiade	Porto Alegre, Brazil	5th	400 m hurdles	52.48
1963	Universiade	Porto Alegre, Brazil	8th (h)	4 × 100 m relay	42.7
1964	Olympic Games	Tokyo, Japan	29th (h)	400 m hurdles	53.7
1965	South American Championships	Rio de Janeiro, Brazil	8th (h)	400 m	49.2
1965	South American Championships	Rio de Janeiro, Brazil	5th	110 m hurdles	16.1
1965	South American Championships	Rio de Janeiro, Brazil	3rd	400 m hurdles	52.5
1967	South American Championships	Buenos Aires, Argentina	19th (h)	400 m	52.1
1967	South American Championships	Buenos Aires, Argentina	10th (h)	400 m hurdles	55.8
