= Athletics at the 1963 Pan American Games – Men's 10,000 metres =

Men's 10,000 metres at the Pan American Games

The men's 10,000 metres event at the 1963 Pan American Games was held at the Pacaembu Stadium in São Paulo on 1 May.

== Results ==
Rank	Name	Nationality	Time	Notes
1st place, gold medalist(s)	Pete McArdle	United States	29:52.22	
2nd place, silver medalist(s)	Osvaldo Suárez	Argentina	30:26.56	
3rd place, bronze medalist(s)	Eligio Galicia	Mexico	30:27.90	
4	John Gutnecht	United States	30:33.90	
5	Doug Kyle	Canada	31:47.39	
6	Ricardo Vidal	Chile	31:54.57	
7	João dos Santos Filho	Brazil	32:22.41	
	Benedito Martins	Brazil	DNF	
	Francisco Allen	Chile	DNS	
	Fidel Negrete	Mexico	DNS	
	Ramnarine	British Guiana	DNS	
