= Carlota Ulloa =

Chilean hurdler (born 1944)

Personal information
- Born: 3 March 1944 (age 82) Santiago, Chile
- Height: 1.60 m (5 ft 3 in)
- Weight: 53 kg (117 lb)

Sport
- Sport: Track and field
- Event: 80 metres hurdles

Carlota Ulloa (born 3 March 1944) is a Chilean hurdler. She competed in the women's 80 metres hurdles at the 1968 Summer Olympics. Ulloa finished fourth in the 80 metres hurdles at the 1967 Pan American Games.

== International competitions ==
Year	Competition	Venue	Position	Event	Notes
Representing Chile
1962	Ibero-American Games	Madrid, Spain	5th (h)	200 m	28.0 s
1962	Ibero-American Games	Madrid, Spain	1st	4 × 100 m relay	48.7 s
1962	Ibero-American Games	Madrid, Spain	7th (q)	Long jump	5.09 m^{1}
1965	South American Championships	Rio de Janeiro, Brazil	8th (h)	200 m	27.0 s
1965	South American Championships	Rio de Janeiro, Brazil	2nd	80 m hurdles	12.0 s
1965	South American Championships	Rio de Janeiro, Brazil	3rd	4 × 100 m relay	49.0 s
1965	South American Championships	Rio de Janeiro, Brazil	1st	Long jump	5.53 m
1967	Pan American Games	Winnipeg, Canada	4th	80 m hurdles	11.19 s
1967	South American Championships	Buenos Aires, Argentina	1st	80 m hurdles	12.0 s
1967	South American Championships	Buenos Aires, Argentina	4th	4 × 100 m relay	48.5 s
1968	Olympic Games	Mexico City, Mexico	25th (h)	80 m hurdles	11.1 s
1969	South American Championships	Quito, Ecuador	1st	80 m hurdles	11.0 s
1969	South American Championships	Quito, Ecuador	5th	Long jump	5.58 m
1969	South American Championships	Quito, Ecuador	3rd	Pentathlon	4107 pts

^{1}No mark in the final

== Personal bests ==
- 200 metres – 25.4h (1969)
- 80 metres hurdles – 11.13 (1968)
- 80 metres hurdles – 11.0h (1969)
