= Athletics at the 1967 Pan American Games – Women's 80 metres hurdles =

Women's 80 metres hurdles at the Pan American Games

The women's 80 metres hurdles event at the 1967 Pan American Games was held in Winnipeg on 4 and 5 August. It was the last time that this event was held before being replaced with 100 metres hurdles.

== Medalists ==
Gold	Silver	Bronze
Cherrie Sherrard; United States	Mamie Rallins; United States	Thora Best; Trinidad and Tobago

== Results ==
=== Heats ===
Wind:
Heat 1: -1.0 m/s, Heat 2: -0.7 m/s

Rank	Heat	Name	Nationality	Time	Notes
1	2	Cherrie Sherrard	United States	10.95	Q
2	1	Mamie Rallins	United States	11.03	Q
3	2	Thora Best	Trinidad and Tobago	11.22	Q
4	2	Jenny Meldrum	Canada	11.28	Q
5	1	Carlota Ulloa	Chile	11.30	Q
6	1	Daisy Echevarría	Cuba	11.57	Q
7	2	Gisela Vidal	Venezuela	11.67	Q
8	1	Enriqueta Basilio	Mexico	11.87	Q
9	2	Alicia Barrera	Peru	12.20	
10	2	Esperanza Girón	Mexico	12.28	
11	2	Elvira Quiñónez	Ecuador	12.77	
	1	Barbara Dallimore	Canada	DQ	
	1	Carmen Smith	Jamaica	DNS	

=== Final ===
Wind: +1.8 m/s

Rank	Name	Nationality	Time	Notes
1st place, gold medalist(s)	Cherrie Sherrard	United States	10.83	
2nd place, silver medalist(s)	Mamie Rallins	United States	10.85	
3rd place, bronze medalist(s)	Thora Best	Trinidad and Tobago	10.98	
4	Carlota Ulloa	Chile	11.19	
5	Gisela Vidal	Venezuela	11.56	
6	Daisy Echevarría	Cuba	11.56	
7	Enriqueta Basilio	Mexico	11.83	
8	Jenny Meldrum	Canada	12.18	
