= Gisela Vidal =

Personal information
- Full name: Gisela Aura Vidal Barreto
- Born: February 21, 1940 (age 86) Maipure, Bolívar, Venezuela
- Died: October 9, 2022 (aged 82)

Sport
- Sport: Athletics
- Events: 100 metres, 200 metres, long jump

Gisela Aura Vidal Barreto (born 21 February 1940 – 9 October 2022) was a Venezuelan athlete competing in the sprinting events and the long jump.

== Career ==
She was considered a pioneer of Venezuelan athletics and won the athlete of the year title three times. She won multiple medals at regional level including a silver at the 1967 Pan American Games. There she set the national record of 6.20 metres, which stayed unbeaten for 32 years. She retired from athletics after not being selected for the 1968 Summer Olympics. Later she moved to the Margarita Island and worked as a dentist.

== International competitions ==
Year	Competition	Venue	Position	Event	Notes
Representing Venezuela
1961	Bolivarian Games	Barranquilla, Colombia	3rd	4 × 100 m relay	52.3 s
1961	Bolivarian Games	Barranquilla, Colombia	2nd	Long jump	4.83 m
1962	Central American and Caribbean Games	Kingston, Jamaica	19th (h)	100 m	13.0 s
1962	Central American and Caribbean Games	Kingston, Jamaica	7th (h)	80 m hurdles	12.3
1962	Central American and Caribbean Games	Kingston, Jamaica	3rd	Long jump	5.35 m
1962	Ibero-American Games	Madrid, Spain	6th	200 m	27.0 s
1962	Ibero-American Games	Madrid, Spain	8th (h)	80 m hurdles	12.6 s
1962	Ibero-American Games	Madrid, Spain	3rd	Long jump	5.40 m
1963	Pan American Games	São Paulo, Brazil	11th (h)	200 m	25.97 s
1963	Pan American Games	São Paulo, Brazil	4th	Long jump	5.42 m
1963	South American Championships	Cali, Colombia	6th (h)	100 m	12.4 s (w)
1963	South American Championships	Cali, Colombia	5th	200 m	25.6 s
1963	South American Championships	Cali, Colombia	6th (h)	80 m hurdles	11.9 s
1963	South American Championships	Cali, Colombia	3rd	Long jump	5.31 m
1965	Bolivarian Games	Quito, Ecuador	3rd	100 m	12.5 s
1965	Bolivarian Games	Quito, Ecuador	2nd	200 m	25.6 s
1965	Bolivarian Games	Quito, Ecuador	1st	80 m hurdles	11.8 s
1965	Bolivarian Games	Quito, Ecuador	1st	4 × 100 m relay	48.8 s
1965	Bolivarian Games	Quito, Ecuador	1st	Long jump	5.67 m
1966	Central American and Caribbean Games	San Juan, Puerto Rico	10th (sf)	100 m	12.6 s
1966	Central American and Caribbean Games	San Juan, Puerto Rico	7th (h)	200 m	25.8 s
1966	Central American and Caribbean Games	San Juan, Puerto Rico	5th	80 m hurdles	11.8 s
1966	Central American and Caribbean Games	San Juan, Puerto Rico	5th	Long jump	5.36 m
1967	Pan American Games	Winnipeg, Canada	5th	80 m hurdles	11.56 s
1967	Pan American Games	Winnipeg, Canada	2nd	Long jump	6.20 m
1967	Pan American Games	Winnipeg, Canada	4th	Pentathlon	4385 pts

== Personal bests ==
- Long jump – 6.20 metres (Winnipeg 1967) former NR
