= João Gonçalves =

João Gonçalves may refer to:

- João Gonçalves (footballer, born 1988), Portuguese football manager and former right-back
- João Gonçalves (footballer, born 2000), Portuguese football goalkeeper for AVS
- João Armando Gonçalves (born 1963), Portuguese member of the World Scout Committee
