= Gustavo Gutiérrez (athlete) =

Ecuadorian long-distance runner

Personal information
- Nickname: Papi Gusta
- Born: September 26, 1939 (age 86) Mulalillo, Ecuador
- Height: 1.69 m (5 ft 7 in)
- Weight: 60 kg (132 lb)

Sport
- Country: Ecuador
- Sport: Running
- Event: Quito Ultimas Noticias

Achievements and titles
- Olympic finals: 1968 Olympics
- Personal best: 3:03:07
Medal record
Men's Athletics
Representing Ecuador
Bolivarian Games
Silver medal – second place	1965 Quito	Half marathon

Gustavo Gutiérrez (a.k.a. Papi Gusta) (born September 26, 1939 in Mulalillo, Ecuador) is an Ecuadorian former marathon runner. He began his training when he was fifteen years old. Gustavo is a three-time winner of the biggest race in Ecuador, Quito Ultimas Noticias (El Circuito de los Barrios) in 1963, 1967, and again in 1968. In 1967, he was named athlete of the year in Ecuador. He was the first Ecuadorian athlete to qualify for the Olympics. In 1968, he represented Ecuador in the 1968 Summer Olympics, in Mexico City, competing in the marathon. In 1969, he broke the South American record for the half marathon completing it in one hour, eight minutes, and fifteen seconds. Twenty years after his third victory in the Quito Ultimas Noticias his daughter Pilar Gutierrez and grandson Iver Paredes ran in the 2008 Quito Ultimas Noticias. Papi Gusta ran the final five kilometers alongside his daughter.

== International competitions ==
Year	Competition	Venue	Position	Event	Notes
Representing Ecuador
1965	Bolivarian Games	Quito, Ecuador	2nd	Half marathon	1:12:25 A
1967	South American Championships	Buenos Aires, Argentina	6th	5000 m	15:23.8
1967	South American Championships	Buenos Aires, Argentina	6th	10,000 m	32:42.4
1967	South American Championships	Buenos Aires, Argentina		Marathon	DNF
1968	Olympic Games	Mexico City, Mexico	53rd	Marathon	3:03:07
1969	South American Championships	Quito, Ecuador	4th	10,000 m	33:12.6
