= 1965 South American Championships in Athletics =

- Dates: 8–16 May
- Host city: Rio de Janeiro, Brazil
- Venue: Estádio Célio de Barros
- Events: 31
- Participation: 8 nations

The 1965 South American Championships in Athletics were held at the Estádio Célio de Barros in Rio de Janeiro, Brazil, between 8 and 16 May. This was the last edition of the Championships in which Brazil did not top the medal table.

== Medal summary ==
=== Men's events ===
Event	Gold		Silver		Bronze	
100 metres	Iván Moreno; Chile	10.4	Héctor Thomas; Venezuela	10.5	Manuel Planchart; Venezuela	10.7
200 metres	Carlos Barón; Chile	21.6	Hortensio Fucil; Venezuela	21.6	Iván Moreno; Chile	21.9
400 metres	Víctor Maldonado; Venezuela	47.5	Pedro Grajales; Colombia	47.5	Andrés Calonge; Argentina	48.4
800 metres	Leslie Mentor; Venezuela	1:54.5	Jorge Grosser; Chile	1:55.1	José Azevedo; Brazil	1:55.3
1500 metres	Tharso de Andrade; Brazil	3:53.9	Albertino Etchechury; Uruguay	3:54.1	Domingo Amaisón; Argentina	3:54.5
5000 metres	Domingo Amaisón; Argentina	14:46.5	Mario Cutropia; Argentina	14:49.9	Ricardo Vidal; Chile	14:53.8
10,000 metres	Mario Cutropia; Argentina	31:39.1	Domingo Amaisón; Argentina	32:01.0	Ricardo Vidal; Chile	32:11.0
Marathon	Ricardo Vidal; Chile	2:38:15 CR	Dorival Silva; Brazil	2:38:23	Domingo Amaisón; Argentina	2:40:13
110 metres hurdles	Carlos Mossa; Brazil	15.2	Guillermo Vallanía; Argentina	15.3	Hernando Arrechea; Colombia	15.7
400 metres hurdles	Víctor Maldonado; Venezuela	51.5	Juan Carlos Dyrzka; Argentina	52.0	José Cavero; Peru	52.5
3000 metres steeplechase	Domingo Amaisón; Argentina	9:03.0 CR	Albertino Etchechury; Uruguay	9:07.5	Sebastião Mendes; Brazil	9:22.2
4 × 100 metres relay	Brazil; Joe Satow; José da Conceição; Affonso da Silva; Araken da Costa	41.2	Venezuela; Arquímedes Herrera; Manuel Planchart; Rafael Romero; Hortensio Fusil	41.3	Colombia; Miguel Carabacho; Francisco Gutiérrez; Tito Diago; Pedro Grajales	41.6
4 × 400 metres relay	Venezuela; Aristides Pineda; José Jacinto Hidalgo; Hortensio Fusil; Víctor Maldonado	3:14.5	Brazil; Altemerindo Amorim; Joel Rocha; Waldemar Montesano; Ernani Eisele	3:15.9	Argentina; Carlos Heuchert; Guillermo Vallania; Juan Carlos Dyrzka; Andrés Calonge	3:17.3
High jump	Eleuterio Fassi; Argentina	1.97	Roberto Abugattás; Peru	1.97	Carlos Colchado; Peru	1.91
Pole vault	Erico Barney; Argentina	4.25 AR	Parmenio Restrepo; Colombia	3.95	Maurício de Souza; Brazil	3.90
Long jump	Iván Moreno; Chile	7.29	Héctor Thomas; Venezuela	7.24	José Telles da Conceição; Brazil	7.06
Triple jump	Nelson Prudêncio; Brazil	14.96	Mário Gomes; Brazil	14.87	Juan Ivanovic; Chile	14.53
Shot put	José Jacques; Brazil	15.61	Luis Di Cursi; Argentina	15.29	Mario Peretti; Argentina	15.00
Discus throw	João Alexandre; Brazil	48.25	Dieter Gevert; Chile	48.15	Dagoberto González; Colombia	48.04
Hammer throw	Roberto Chapchap; Brazil	56.62 CR	José Vallejo; Argentina	54.94	Marcelino Borrero; Colombia	51.46
Javelin throw	Ian Barney; Argentina	66.43	Patricio Etcheverry; Chile	64.45	Jesús Rodríguez; Venezuela	64.28
Decathlon	Héctor Thomas; Venezuela	6555	Roberto Caravaca; Venezuela	6028	Renato Renk; Brazil	5486

=== Women's events ===
Event	Gold		Silver		Bronze	
100 metres	Marta Buongiorno; Argentina	12.2	Erica da Silva; Brazil	12.4	Emilia Dyrzka; Argentina	12.5
200 metres	Marta Buongiorno; Argentina	25.3	Erica da Silva; Brazil	25.6	Ada Brener; Argentina	25.7
80 metres hurdles	Emilia Dyrzka; Argentina	11.6	Carlota Ulloa; Chile	12.0	Marisol Massot; Chile	12.1
4 × 100 metres relay	Brazil; Edir Ribeiro; Gloria Ferraz; Leda Santos; Erica da Silva	47.7	Argentina; Alicia Kaufmanas; Emilia Dyrzka; Ada Brener; Marta Buongiorno	47.9	Chile; Nelly Orellana; María Cristina Ducci; Carlota Ulloa; Marisol Massot	49.0
High jump	Maria da Conceição; Brazil	1.69 CR	Aída dos Santos; Brazil	1.66	Irenice Rodrigues; Brazil	1.51
Long jump	Carlota Ulloa; Chile	5.53	Alicia Kaufmanas; Argentina	5.38	Edir Ribeiro; Brazil	5.28
Shot put	Norma Suárez; Argentina	12.93 CR	Miriam Yutronic; Chile	12.38	Eliana Bahamondes; Chile	12.25
Discus throw	Miriam Yutronic; Chile	45.33	Odete Domingos; Brazil	39.92	Isolina Vergara; Colombia	39.73
Javelin throw	Kiyomi Nakagawa; Brazil	41.51	Delia Vera; Peru	40.76	Rosa Molina; Chile	40.23

== Medal table ==
* Host nation (Brazil)

Rank	Nation	Gold	Silver	Bronze	Total
1	Argentina (ARG)	10	8	7	25
2	Brazil (BRA)*	10	7	7	24
3	Chile (CHI)	6	5	8	19
4	Venezuela (VEN)	5	5	2	12
5	Colombia (COL)	0	2	5	7
6	Peru (PER)	0	2	2	4
7	Uruguay (URU)	0	2	0	2
Totals (7 entries)		31	31	31	93
