= Vittorio Roscio =

Italian sprinter

Personal information
- Nationality: Italian
- Born: 20 February 1943 (age 83) Turin, Italy

Sport
- Country: Italy
- Sport: Athletics
- Event: Sprint
Medal record
1967 Summer Universiade
Gold medal – first place	1967 Tokyo	4×100 metres relay

Vittorio Roscio (born 20 February 1943 in Turin) was an Italian sprinter.

== Biography ==
He won one medal at the International athletics competitions, he has 4 caps in national team from 1968 to 1973.

== National titles ==
Vittorio Roscio has won one time the individual national championship.

- 1 win in the 60 metres indoor (1972)

== See also ==
- Italy national relay team
