= 1963 South American Championships in Athletics – Results =

These are the results of the 1963 South American Championships in Athletics which took place at the Estadio Pascual Guerrero in Cali, Colombia, between 29 June and 7 July.

== Men's results ==
=== 100 metres ===
Heats – 29 June

Rank	Heat	Name	Nationality	Time	Notes
1	1	Arquímedes Herrera	Venezuela	10.2w	Q
2	1	Affonso da Silva	Brazil	10.3w	Q
3	1	Roberto Alvarado	Peru	10.7w	Q
4	1	Carlos Vampoecke	Argentina	10.7w	
1	2	José Thomas	Venezuela	10.5w	Q
2	2	Miguel Corvacho	Colombia	10.8w	Q
3	2	Juan Hasegawa	Peru	10.8w	Q
4	2	Mauro Acosta	Ecuador	11.3w	
1	3	Jaime Uribe	Colombia	10.5w	Q
2	3	Joel da Costa	Brazil	10.6w	Q
3	3	Clive Bonas	Venezuela	10.7w	Q
4	3	Carlos Biondi	Argentina	10.8w	
1	4	Joe Satow	Brazil	10.1w	Q
2	4	Gerardo Di Tolla	Peru	10.3w	Q
3	4	Francisco Gutiérrez	Colombia	10.7w	Q
4	4	Noel Revello	Uruguay	10.9w	

Semifinals – 29 June

Rank	Heat	Name	Nationality	Time	Notes
1	1	Joe Satow	Brazil	10.3w	Q
2	1	Gerardo Di Tolla	Peru	10.5w	Q
3	1	Juan Hasegawa	Peru	10.6w	Q
4	1	José Thomas	Venezuela	10.7w	
5	1	Francisco Gutiérrez	Colombia	10.7w	
	1	Joel da Costa	Brazil	DQ	
1	2	Arquímedes Herrera	Venezuela	10.0w	Q
2	2	Affonso da Silva	Brazil	10.4w	Q
3	2	Jaime Uribe	Colombia	10.5w	Q
4	2	Miguel Corvacho	Colombia	10.5w	
5	2	Roberto Alvarado	Peru	10.5w	
6	2	Clive Bonas	Venezuela	10.5w	

Final – 30 June

Rank	Name	Nationality	Time	Notes
1st place, gold medalist(s)	Arquímedes Herrera	Venezuela	10.2	CR
2nd place, silver medalist(s)	Joe Satow	Brazil	10.4	
3rd place, bronze medalist(s)	Affonso da Silva	Brazil	10.7	
4	Gerardo Di Tolla	Peru	10.7	
5	Jaime Uribe	Colombia	10.8	
6	Juan Hasegawa	Peru	10.9	

=== 200 metres ===
Heats – 2 July

Rank	Heat	Name	Nationality	Time	Notes
1	1	Arquímedes Herrera	Venezuela	21.1	Q
2	1	Joel da Costa	Brazil	22.2	Q
3	1	Miguel Corvacho	Colombia	22.3	Q
4	1	Noel Revello	Uruguay	22.7	
1	2	Hortensio Fucil	Venezuela	21.9	Q
2	2	Affonso da Silva	Brazil	22.0	Q
3	2	Carlos Biondi	Argentina	22.3	Q
4	2	Roberto Alvarado	Peru	22.5	
1	3	Gerardo Di Tolla	Peru	21.7	Q
2	3	Guillermo Vallania	Argentina	22.3	Q
3	3	Pedro Grajales	Colombia	22.3	Q
4	3	António Carlos da Silva	Brazil	22.7	
5	3	Mauro Acosta	Ecuador	23.8	
1	4	Juan Stocker	Argentina	21.6	Q
2	4	Jaime Uribe	Colombia	22.0	Q
3	4	Emilio Romero	Venezuela	22.0	Q
4	4	Juan Francisco Aguilar	Uruguay	22.3	
5	4	Víctor Ibáñez	Peru	22.7	

Semifinals – 2 July

Rank	Heat	Name	Nationality	Time	Notes
1	1	Arquímedes Herrera	Venezuela	21.2	Q
2	1	Gerardo Di Tolla	Peru	21.5	Q
3	1	Affonso da Silva	Brazil	21.9	Q
4	1	Emilio Romero	Venezuela	22.2	
5	1	Guillermo Vallania	Argentina	22.2	
6	1	Pedro Grajales	Colombia	22.3	
1	2	Hortensio Fucil	Venezuela	21.1	Q
2	2	Juan Stocker	Argentina	21.6	Q
3	2	Jaime Uribe	Colombia	22.0	Q
4	2	Carlos Biondi	Argentina	22.0	
5	2	Joel da Costa	Brazil	22.3	
6	2	Miguel Corvacho	Colombia	22.6	

Final – 4 July

Rank	Name	Nationality	Time	Notes
1st place, gold medalist(s)	Arquímedes Herrera	Venezuela	20.8	CR
2nd place, silver medalist(s)	Hortensio Fucil	Venezuela	21.0	
3rd place, bronze medalist(s)	Gerardo Di Tolla	Peru	21.2	
4	Affonso da Silva	Brazil	21.6	
5	Jaime Uribe	Colombia	21.6	
6	Juan Stocker	Argentina	21.6	

=== 400 metres ===
Heats – 29 June

Rank	Heat	Name	Nationality	Time	Notes
1	1	Hortensio Fucil	Venezuela	47.2	Q, AR
2	1	Juan Francisco Aguilar	Uruguay	48.3	Q
3	1	Juan Stocker	Argentina	48.6	
4	1	Pedro Grajales	Colombia	49.1	
	1	José Cruz	Peru	DQ	
1	2	Juan Carlos Dyrzka	Argentina	47.6	Q
2	2	Arístides Pineda	Venezuela	48.1	Q
3	2	Joel Rocha	Brazil	49.2	
4	2	Moisés Pimentel	Peru	49.9	
5	2	César Zapata	Colombia	50.2	
6	2	Jorge Vilaboa	Uruguay	50.9	
1	3	Anubes da Silva	Brazil	47.4	Q
2	3	Víctor Maldonado	Venezuela	48.2	Q
3	3	Óscar Rivera	Colombia	48.5	
4	3	Mario Rivet	Argentina	49.5	
5	3	Víctor Ibáñez	Peru	50.6	
6	3	Mario Zambrano	Ecuador	50.6	

Final – 30 June

Rank	Name	Nationality	Time	Notes
1st place, gold medalist(s)	Hortensio Fucil	Venezuela	46.7	AR
2nd place, silver medalist(s)	Juan Carlos Dyrzka	Argentina	47.6	
3rd place, bronze medalist(s)	Víctor Maldonado	Venezuela	48.5	
4	Juan Francisco Aguilar	Uruguay	48.7	
5	Anubes da Silva	Brazil	48.7	
6	Arístides Pineda	Venezuela	49.2	

=== 800 metres ===
Heats – 2 July

Rank	Heat	Name	Nationality	Time	Notes
1	1	José Gregorio Neira	Colombia	1:55.8	Q
2	1	José Azevedo	Brazil	1:56.5	Q
3	1	Rafael Melo	Colombia	1:57.0	Q
4	1	Enrique Alfonso	Venezuela	1:57.3	
5	1	Raúl Gómez	Argentina	1:57.8	
6	1	Mario Zambrano	Ecuador	1:58.0	
1	2	Leslie Mentor	Venezuela	1:54.0	Q
2	2	Óscar Rivera	Colombia	1:54.3	Q
3	2	Alejandro Arroyo	Ecuador	1:55.2	Q
4	2	Silvério Silva	Brazil	1:55.2	q
5	2	Paulo de Araújo	Brazil	1:55.8	q
6	2	Mario Rivet	Argentina	1:56.1	

Final – 4 July

Rank	Name	Nationality	Time	Notes
1st place, gold medalist(s)	Óscar Rivera	Colombia	1:52.2	
2nd place, silver medalist(s)	José Gregorio Neira	Colombia	1:52.9	
3rd place, bronze medalist(s)	Leslie Mentor	Venezuela	1:53.1	
4	Paulo de Araújo	Brazil	1:53.2	
5	José Azevedo	Brazil	1:54.2	
6	Silvério Silva	Brazil	1:54.3	
7	Alejandro Arroyo	Ecuador	1:54.9	

=== 1500 metres ===
30 June

Rank	Name	Nationality	Time	Notes
1st place, gold medalist(s)	Álvaro Mejía	Colombia	3:53.5	
2nd place, silver medalist(s)	José Gregorio Neira	Colombia	3:54.4	
3rd place, bronze medalist(s)	José Azevedo	Brazil	3:55.9	
4	José Primo	Brazil	3:57.8	
5	José Sobrinho	Brazil	3:58.2	
6	Leslie Mentor	Venezuela	3:59.1	
7	Alberto Ríos	Argentina	3:59.9	
8	Alejandro Arroyo	Ecuador	4:01.1	

=== 5000 metres ===
29 June

Rank	Name	Nationality	Time	Notes
1st place, gold medalist(s)	Osvaldo Suárez	Argentina	14:49.8	
2nd place, silver medalist(s)	Harvey Borrero	Colombia	15:00.5	
3rd place, bronze medalist(s)	Domingo Amaizón	Argentina	15:01.2	
4	Manuel Cabrera	Colombia	15:05.8	
5	Luis Navas	Colombia	15:06.1	
6	Luiz Caetano	Brazil	15:26.4	
7	Efrén Castello	Ecuador	15:50.0	

=== 10,000 metres ===
4 July

Rank	Name	Nationality	Time	Notes
1st place, gold medalist(s)	Osvaldo Suárez	Argentina	31:09.6	
2nd place, silver medalist(s)	Domingo Amaizón	Argentina	31:17.0	
3rd place, bronze medalist(s)	Luiz Caetano	Brazil	31:20.9	
4	Eugenio Galviz	Colombia	31:21.98	
5	Luis Navas	Colombia	31:55.6	
6	Benedito do Amaral	Brazil	32:57.6	
7	Efrén Castello	Ecuador	33:16.2	

=== Half marathon ===
7 July

Rank	Name	Nationality	Time	Notes
1st place, gold medalist(s)	Luiz Caetano	Brazil	1:09:41	
2nd place, silver medalist(s)	Luis Navas	Colombia	1:09:55	
3rd place, bronze medalist(s)	Hernán Barreneche	Colombia	1:11:29	
4	Germán Lozano	Colombia	1:11:36	
5	Benedito do Amaral	Brazil	1:13:25	
6	Alberto Ríos	Argentina	1:13:55	
7	Ulises Usuca	Uruguay	1:16:35	
8	Luis Altamirano	Argentina	1:17:16	
9	Edgar Freire	Brazil	1:19:00	
10	Alejandro Flores	Ecuador	1:20:11	

=== 110 metres hurdles ===
Heats – 30 June

Rank	Heat	Name	Nationality	Time	Notes
1	1	José Telles da Conceição	Brazil	15.4	Q
2	1	Manuel Álvarez	Colombia	15.4	Q
3	1	José Cavero	Peru	15.6	
4	1	Noel Davis Bell	Venezuela	15.6	
5	1	Julio Ibarreche	Argentina	16.7	
	1	Elbio García	Uruguay	DQ	
1	2	John Muñoz	Venezuela	15.2	Q
2	2	José Contel	Brazil	15.4	Q
3	2	Hernando Arrechea	Colombia	15.7	
1	3	Lancelot Bobb	Venezuela	15.0	Q
2	3	Cleomenes da Cunha	Brazil	15.3	Q
3	3	Guillermo Vallania	Argentina	16.0	
4	3	Rodolfo Díaz	Uruguay	16.3	
	3	Roberto Abugattás	Peru	DQ	

Final – 2 July

Rank	Name	Nationality	Time	Notes
1st place, gold medalist(s)	John Muñoz	Venezuela	15.0	
2nd place, silver medalist(s)	José Telles da Conceição	Brazil	15.2	
3rd place, bronze medalist(s)	Cleomenes da Cunha	Brazil	15.5	
4	Manuel Álvarez	Colombia	15.5	
5	Lancelot Bobb	Venezuela	15.5	
6	José Contel	Brazil	15.6	

=== 400 metres hurdles ===
Heats – 4 July

Rank	Heat	Name	Nationality	Time	Notes
1	1	Víctor Maldonado	Venezuela	52.4	Q
2	1	José Cavero	Peru	52.5	Q
3	1	Ulisses dos Santos	Brazil	55.4	
1	2	Juan Carlos Dyrzka	Argentina	52.7	Q
2	2	Arístides Pineda	Venezuela	53.8	Q
3	2	Guaracy da Silva	Brazil	54.9	
4	2	Manuel Álvarez	Colombia	59.8	
1	3	Anubes da Silva	Brazil	52.6	Q
2	3	Leonel Pedroza	Colombia	57.0	Q

Final – 4 July

Rank	Name	Nationality	Time	Notes
1st place, gold medalist(s)	Juan Carlos Dyrzka	Argentina	51.0	CR
2nd place, silver medalist(s)	Víctor Maldonado	Venezuela	51.5	
3rd place, bronze medalist(s)	Anubes da Silva	Brazil	51.8	
4	José Cavero	Peru	52.1	
5	Arístides Pineda	Venezuela	52.2	
6	Leonel Pedroza	Colombia	56.8	

=== 3000 metres steeplechase ===
6 July

Rank	Name	Nationality	Time	Notes
1st place, gold medalist(s)	Domingo Amaizón	Argentina	9:13.0	
2nd place, silver medalist(s)	Sebastião Mendes	Brazil	9:28.7	
3rd place, bronze medalist(s)	José Primo	Brazil	9:29.7	
4	Alberto Ríos	Argentina	9:36.1	
5	Edgar Freire	Brazil	9:44.5	
6	Manuel Cabrera	Colombia	9:46.3	
7	Albertino Etchechury	Uruguay	9:46.6	
8	Hernando Ruiz	Colombia	9:56.7	

=== 4 × 100 metres relay ===
6 July

Rank	Nation	Competitors	Time	Notes
1st place, gold medalist(s)	Brazil	Joe Satow, Joel Costa, Affonso da Silva, José Telles da Conceição	40.9	
2nd place, silver medalist(s)	Colombia	Jaime Uribe, Francisco Gutiérrez, Pedro Grajales, Leonel Pedroza	41.2	
3rd place, bronze medalist(s)	Argentina	Carlos Vampoecke, Juan Carlos Dyrzka, Guillermo Vallania, Carlos Biondi	41.6	
4	Peru	Moisés Pimentel, Roberto Alvarado, Juan Hasegawa, Gerardo di Tolla	42.0	
	Venezuela		DQ	

=== 4 × 400 metres relay ===
7 July

Rank	Nation	Competitors	Time	Notes
1st place, gold medalist(s)	Venezuela	Aristides Pineda, Leslie Mentor, Víctor Maldonado, Hortensio Fucil	3:13.0	CR
2nd place, silver medalist(s)	Brazil	Inanadir da Silva, Joel Rocha, Geraldo Costa, Anubes da Silva	3:14.7	
3rd place, bronze medalist(s)	Argentina	Mario Rivet, Guillermo Vallania, Juan Stocker, Juan Carlos Dyrzka	3:15.3	
4	Colombia	Leonel Pedroza, Óscar Rivera, Miguel Zapata, Pedro Grajales	3:15.9	
5	Peru	Gerardo Di Tolla, Jorge Cruz, Moisés Pimentel, José Cavero	3:20.1	

=== High jump ===
29 June

Rank	Name	Nationality	Result	Notes
1st place, gold medalist(s)	Roberto Abugattás	Peru	1.97	
2nd place, silver medalist(s)	Eleuterio Fassi	Argentina	1.94	
3rd place, bronze medalist(s)	Manoel Cezar	Brazil	1.88	
4	Cristián Errazuriz	Chile	1.88	
5	Aquino dos Santos	Brazil	1.88	
6	Roberto Pozzi	Argentina	1.85	

=== Pole vault ===
2 July

Rank	Name	Nationality	Result	Notes
1st place, gold medalist(s)	Mario Eleusippi	Argentina	4.10	CR
2nd place, silver medalist(s)	César Quintero	Colombia	3.80	
3rd place, bronze medalist(s)	Marcelo de Souza	Brazil	3.70	
4	Marseno Martins	Brazil	3.70	
5	Parmenio Restrepo	Colombia	3.70	
6	Enrique Cajigas	Colombia	3.70	

=== Long jump ===
2 July

Rank	Name	Nationality	Result	Notes
1st place, gold medalist(s)	Héctor Thomas	Venezuela	7.22	
2nd place, silver medalist(s)	John Muñoz	Venezuela	7.16	
3rd place, bronze medalist(s)	Roberto Caravaca	Venezuela	6.97	
4	Hernando Gutiérrez	Colombia	6.81	
5	Joel Costa	Brazil	6.72	
6	Julio Ibarreche	Argentina	6.69	

=== Triple jump ===
4 July

Rank	Name	Nationality	Result	Notes
1st place, gold medalist(s)	Asnoldo Devonish	Venezuela	15.09	
2nd place, silver medalist(s)	José López	Venezuela	15.01	
3rd place, bronze medalist(s)	Mario Gomes	Brazil	14.90	
4	Luis Huarcaya	Peru	14.59	
5	Silvio da Silva	Brazil	14.14	
6	Alvez Thomas	Venezuela	14.10	

=== Shot put ===
2 July

Rank	Name	Nationality	Result	Notes
1st place, gold medalist(s)	José Carlos Jacques	Brazil	15.08	
2nd place, silver medalist(s)	Luis Di Cursi	Argentina	15.06	
3rd place, bronze medalist(s)	Dagoberto González	Colombia	14.02	
4	José Bracho	Venezuela	13.95	
5	Darcy Maria	Brazil	13.89	
6	José Alberto Vallejo	Argentina	13.69	

=== Discus throw ===
6 July

Rank	Name	Nationality	Result	Notes
1st place, gold medalist(s)	Dagoberto González	Colombia	48.84	
2nd place, silver medalist(s)	Daniel Cereali	Venezuela	47.85	
3rd place, bronze medalist(s)	Luis Di Cursi	Argentina	46.37	
4	Héctor Menacho	Peru	46.30	
5	João Alexandre	Brazil	44.45	
6	Claudio Romanini	Brazil	43.76	

=== Hammer throw ===
30 June

Rank	Name	Nationality	Result	Notes
1st place, gold medalist(s)	Daniel Cereali	Venezuela	56.07	CR
2nd place, silver medalist(s)	Roberto Chapchap	Brazil	55.08	
3rd place, bronze medalist(s)	Orlando Guaita	Chile	54.64	
4	José Alberto Vallejo	Argentina	54.12	
5	Marcelino Borrero	Colombia	53.24	
6	Carlos Marzo	Argentina	52.40	

=== Javelin throw ===
29 June – old model

Rank	Name	Nationality	Result	Notes
1st place, gold medalist(s)	Héctor Thomas	Venezuela	64.79	
2nd place, silver medalist(s)	Walter de Almeida	Brazil	63.49	
3rd place, bronze medalist(s)	Patricio Etcheverry	Chile	63.18	
4	Ricardo Héber	Argentina	63.13	
5	Ian Barney	Argentina	62.75	
6	Gustavo Morales	Venezuela	51.79	

=== Decathlon ===
15–16 May – 1962 tables (1985 conversions given with *)

The highest mark recorded in each event is highlighted in yellow

Rank	Athlete	Nationality	100m	LJ	SP	HJ	400m	110m H	DT	PV	JT	1500m	Points	Conv.	Notes
1st place, gold medalist(s)	Héctor Thomas	Venezuela	10.4	7.00	14.64	1.75	51.5	16.4	41.89	3.80	54.63	5:26.6	6825	6850*	
2nd place, silver medalist(s)	Cleomenes da Cunha	Brazil	11.0	6.42	11.55	1.75	51.3	15.3	36.64	3.50	55.69	4:54.0	6269	6532*	
3rd place, bronze medalist(s)	Roberto Caravaca	Venezuela	11.3	6.96	11.90	1.70	51.5	16.1	34.73	3.30	45.60	4:30.4	5991	6383*	
4	Marceno Martins	Brazil	10.8	6.19	12.05	1.65	54.3	15.5	34.27	3.50	51.17	5:03.6	5780	6153*	
5	Rodolfo Díaz	Uruguay	11.1	5.97	10.77	1.75	51.3	16.4	33.42	3.20	31.68	4:48.2	5272	5785*	
6	Arthur Palma	Brazil	11.5	5.45	11.48	1.70	52.8	15.6	39.75	3.00	37.92	4:48.8	5259	5782*	
7	Hernando Gutiérrez	Colombia	11.0	6.59	10.91	1.70	56.5	16.8	35.00	2.40	48.56	5:50.2	4763	5421*	
8	Julio Ibarreche	Argentina	11.2	6.58	10.85	1.75	54.6	16.6	29.65	2.70	34.08	5:26.5	4698	5371*	
9	Abisai Escamilla	Colombia	11.5	5.62	9.25	1.60	54.8	20.9	28.82	3.00	38.44	4:49.0	4005	4823*	
	Baby da Silva	Uruguay	11.6	6.55	10.49	1.60	55.0	17.8	24.94	3.40	33.11	DNS	DNF	–	
	Tito Bracho	Venezuela	11.0	6.48	10.91	?	–	–	–	–	–	–	DNF	–	
	Enrique Figueredo	Uruguay	12.2	5.75	13.37	?	–	–	–	–	–	–	DNF	–	

== Women's results ==
=== 100 metres ===
Heats – 29 June

Rank	Heat	Name	Nationality	Time	Notes
1	1	Erica da Silva	Brazil	11.8w	Q
2	1	Susana Ritchie	Argentina	12.0w	Q
3	1	Amparo Ramos	Colombia	12.5w	Q
4	1	Smirna Paz	Colombia	12.5w	
5	1	Leontina dos Santos	Brazil	12.5w	
1	2	Margarita Formeiro	Argentina	11.7w	Q
2	2	Marta Buongiorno	Argentina	12.1w	Q
3	2	Ines Pimenta	Brazil	12.2w	Q
4	2	Gisela Vidal	Venezuela	12.4w	
5	2	Ana Alvarado	Colombia	12.7w	

Final – 30 June

Rank	Name	Nationality	Time	Notes
1st place, gold medalist(s)	Erica da Silva	Brazil	12.0	CR
2nd place, silver medalist(s)	Margarita Formeiro	Argentina	12.1	
3rd place, bronze medalist(s)	Susana Ritchie	Argentina	12.3	
4	Marta Buongiorno	Argentina	12.3	
5	Ines Pimenta	Brazil	12.6	
6	Amparo Ramos	Colombia	12.8	

=== 200 metres ===
Heats – 2 July

Rank	Heat	Name	Nationality	Time	Notes
1	1	Susana Ritchie	Argentina	25.3	Q
2	1	Marta Buongiorno	Argentina	25.4	Q
3	1	Gisela Vidal	Venezuela	26.0	Q
4	1	Ines Pimenta	Brazil	26.0	
5	1	Amparo Ramos	Colombia	26.4	
1	2	Erica da Silva	Brazil	24.4	Q, AR
2	2	Leontina dos Santos	Brazil	26.0	Q
3	2	Emilia Dyrzka	Argentina	26.4	Q
4	2	Smirna Paz	Colombia	26.6	
5	2	Ana Alvarado	Colombia	26.9	

Final – 4 July

Rank	Name	Nationality	Time	Notes
1st place, gold medalist(s)	Erica da Silva	Brazil	24.3	AR
2nd place, silver medalist(s)	Susana Ritchie	Argentina	25.2	
3rd place, bronze medalist(s)	Marta Buongiorno	Argentina	25.4	
4	Emilia Dyrzka	Argentina	25.5	
5	Gisela Vidal	Venezuela	25.6	
6	Leontina dos Santos	Brazil	25.6	

=== 80 metres hurdles ===
Heats – 6 July

Rank	Heat	Name	Nationality	Time	Notes
1	1	Emilia Dyrzka	Argentina	11.5	Q
2	1	Leda dos Santos	Brazil	11.7	Q
3	1	Ana Michelini	Argentina	11.8	Q
4	1	Gisela Vidal	Venezuela	11.9	
5	1	Gloria Aguirre	Colombia	12.9	
6	1	Alicia Barrera	Peru	13.9	
1	2	Iris dos Santos	Brazil	11.6	Q
2	2	Ana María Udini	Uruguay	11.6	Q
3	2	Maria Teixeira	Brazil	12.0	Q
4	2	Ana Alvarado	Colombia	12.8	
5	2	Rosa Utria	Colombia	15.2	

Final – 7 July

Rank	Name	Nationality	Time	Notes
1st place, gold medalist(s)	Emilia Dyrzka	Argentina	11.5	
2nd place, silver medalist(s)	Leda dos Santos	Brazil	11.5	
3rd place, bronze medalist(s)	Maria Teixeira	Brazil	11.7	
4	Iris dos Santos	Brazil	11.8	
5	Ana María Udini	Uruguay	11.9	
6	Ana Michelini	Argentina	11.9	

=== 4 × 100 metres relay ===
6 July

Rank	Nation	Competitors	Time	Notes
1st place, gold medalist(s)	Brazil	Edir Ribeiro, Ines Pimenta, Leda dos Santos, Erica da Silva	47.6	CR
2nd place, silver medalist(s)	Argentina	Margarita Formeiro, Marta Buongiorno, Emilia Dyrzka, Susana Ritchie	47.8	
3rd place, bronze medalist(s)	Colombia	Gloria Aguirre, Ana Alvarado, Smirna Paz, Amparo Ramos	49.8	
4	Peru	Alicia Barrera, Julia Huapaya, María Solano, Delia Vera	54.1	

=== High jump ===
6 July

Rank	Name	Nationality	Result	Notes
1st place, gold medalist(s)	Maria Cipriano	Brazil	1.58	
2nd place, silver medalist(s)	Aída dos Santos	Brazil	1.58	
3rd place, bronze medalist(s)	Irenice Rodrigues	Brazil	1.50	
4	Graciela Paviotti	Argentina	1.40	
5	Paola Palacios	Colombia	1.40	
6	Mabel Farina	Argentina	1.40	

=== Long jump ===
2 July

Rank	Name	Nationality	Result	Notes
1st place, gold medalist(s)	Mabel Farina	Argentina	5.74	
2nd place, silver medalist(s)	Iris dos Santos	Brazil	5.37	
3rd place, bronze medalist(s)	Gisela Vidal	Venezuela	5.31	
4	Alicia Kaufmanas	Argentina	5.26	
5	Laura das Chagas	Brazil	5.17	
6	Edir Ribeiro	Brazil	5.02	

=== Shot put ===
4 July

Rank	Name	Nationality	Result	Notes
1st place, gold medalist(s)	Ingeborg Pfüller	Argentina	12.82	CR
2nd place, silver medalist(s)	Vera Trezoitko	Brazil	12.43	
3rd place, bronze medalist(s)	Maria de Lourdes Conceição	Brazil	12.31	
4	Francisca Roberts	Venezuela	11.97	
5	Iris dos Santos	Brazil	11.42	
6	Ingeborg Mello	Argentina	11.36	

=== Discus throw ===
29 June

Rank	Name	Nationality	Result	Notes
1st place, gold medalist(s)	Ingeborg Pfüller	Argentina	46.36	CR
2nd place, silver medalist(s)	Isolina Vergara	Colombia	39.42	
3rd place, bronze medalist(s)	Ingeborg Mello	Argentina	39.05	
4	Iris dos Santos	Brazil	38.40	
5	Ludmila Tisinova	Argentina	37.66	
6	Odete Domingos	Brazil	37.08	

=== Javelin throw ===
7 July – old model

Rank	Name	Nationality	Result	Notes
1st place, gold medalist(s)	Marlene Ahrens	Chile	44.67	
2nd place, silver medalist(s)	Aída dos Santos	Brazil	38.29	
3rd place, bronze medalist(s)	Carmen Brea	Venezuela	37.93	
4	Vera Trezoitko	Brazil	37.63	
5	Dalia Quintero	Venezuela	34.96	
6	Emma Alvear	Colombia	34.19	
