= Roberto Abugattás =

Peruvian high jumper (1943–2024)

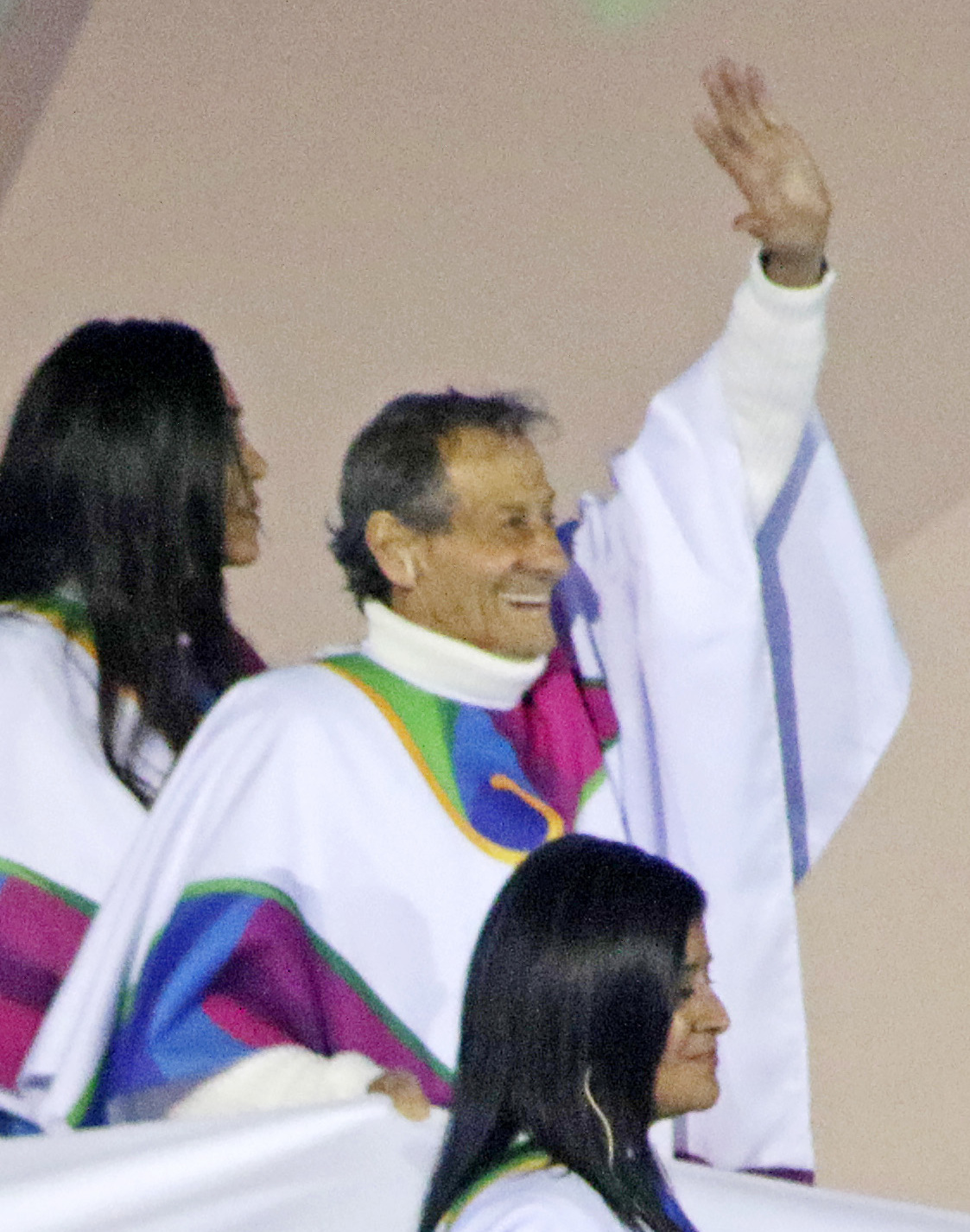
- Abugattás in 2019

Personal information
- Full name: Roberto Nicolás Abugattás
- Nationality: Peruvian
- Born: 17 January 1943 Mollendo, Peru
- Died: 11 January 2024 (aged 80) Lima, Peru
- Height: 1.82 m (6 ft 0 in)
- Weight: 77 kg (170 lb)

Sport
- Sport: Athletics
- Event: High jump
Medal record
Representing Peru
Pan American Games
Bronze medal – third place	1967 Winnipeg	High jump
Summer Universiade
Bronze medal – third place	1963 Porto Alegre	High jump

Roberto Nicolás Abugattás Aboid (17 January 1943 – 11 January 2024) was a Peruvian high jumper. He competed in the 1964 and 1968 Summer Olympics. Abugattás was born on 17 January 1943, and died on 11 January 2024, at the age of 80.

His brother Fernando Abugattás was also a high jumper

His personal best in the high jump was 2.10 metres set in 1977.

== International competitions ==
Year	Competition	Venue	Position	Event	Notes
Representing Peru
1960	South American Junior Championships	Santiago, Chile	4th	High jump	1.70 m
1960	Ibero-American Games	Santiago, Chile	11th (q)	High jump	1.80 m
1961	South American Championships	Lima, Peru	10th (h)	110 m hurdles	16.2 s
1961	South American Junior Championships	Santa Fe, Argentina	4th	110 m hurdles	16.4 s
1961	South American Junior Championships	Santa Fe, Argentina	2nd	4 × 100 m relay	43.9 s
1961	South American Junior Championships	Santa Fe, Argentina	1st	High jump	1.85 m
1961	Bolivarian Games	Barranquilla, Colombia	1st	High jump	1.80 m
1962	South American Junior Championships	Lima, Peru	1st	High jump	2.06 m
1962	Ibero-American Games	Madrid, Spain	2nd	High jump	1.97 m
1963	Pan American Games	São Paulo, Brazil	6th	High jump	1.95 m
1963	South American Championships	Cali, Colombia	–	110 m hurdles	DQ
1963	South American Championships	Cali, Colombia	1st	High jump	1.97 m
1963	Universiade	Porto Alegre, Brazil	3rd	High jump	1.99 m
1964	Olympic Games	Tokyo, Japan	26th (q)	High jump	1.95 m
1965	South American Championships	Rio de Janeiro, Brazil	2nd	High jump	1.97 m
1965	Bolivarian Games	Quito, Ecuador	1st	High jump	1.95 m
1967	Pan American Games	Winnipeg, Canada	3rd	High jump	2.05 m
1967	South American Championships	Buenos Aires, Argentina	11th (h)	110 m hurdles	15.7 s
1967	South American Championships	Buenos Aires, Argentina	2nd	High jump	1.95 m
1967	South American Championships	Buenos Aires, Argentina	–	Decathlon	DNF
1968	Olympic Games	Mexico City, Mexico	35th (q)	High jump	2.00 m
1970	Bolivarian Games	Maracaibo, Venezuela	2nd	High jump	2.05 m
1971	South American Championships	Lima, Peru	2nd	High jump	2.05 m
1973	Bolivarian Games	Panama City, Panama	1st	High jump	2.04 m
1974	South American Championships	Santiago, Chile	3rd	High jump	2.03 m
1975	South American Championships	Rio de Janeiro, Brazil	6th	High jump	2.00 m
1977	Bolivarian Games	La Paz, Bolivia	1st	High jump	2.10 m
