= Arquímedes Herrera =

Venezuelan sprinter (1935–2013)

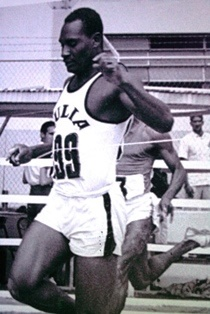

Personal information
- Born: 8 August 1935 Bobures, Zulia
- Died: 30 May 2013 (aged 77) Maracaibo, Zulia
- Height: 178 cm (5 ft 10 in)
- Weight: 76 kg (168 lb)

Sport
- Sport: Men's Athletics

Achievements and titles
- Olympic finals: 1964 Summer Olympics
Medal record
Men's Athletics
Representing Venezuela
Pan American Games
Silver medal – second place	1963 São Paulo	100 metres
Silver medal – second place	1963 São Paulo	4x100m relay
Bronze medal – third place	1963 São Paulo	200 metres
Central American and Caribbean Games
Silver medal – second place	1962 Kingston	200 metres
Bronze medal – third place	1962 Kingston	100 metres
Bolivarian Games
Gold medal – first place	1965 Quito	100 metres
Silver medal – second place	1970 Maracaibo	100 metres
Silver medal – second place	1970 Maracaibo	200 metres
Bronze medal – third place	1965 Quito	200 metres

Arquímedes Herrera (8 August 1935 – 30 May 2013) was a Venezuelan track and field athlete who competed in the sprint events and was ranked #4 in the world in the 100 m in 1963. As a teenager Herrera spent time in the Venezuelan military, taking up his athletics career after his discharge. He claimed three medals at the 1963 Pan American Games held in São Paulo, Brazil. In the final of the 200m dash three athletes crossed the finish line with the same time 21.2 seconds. The Photo finish defined the Venezuelan Rafael Romero stay with gold medal; American Ollan Cassell, with silver; and Herrera, with the bronze. In 1964 he equaled the world record 200-meter dash in 20.5 seconds and also participated at the 1964 Summer Olympics in Tokyo, Japan, where he made the semi-finals in both the 100 metres and 200 metres and was a member of the Venezuelan team which finished sixth in the final of the 4 × 100 metres relay.

Herrera was a claimant to the Masters M35 100 metres world record, running a hand timed 10.3 while taking a silver medal in the 1970 Bolivarian Games in Maracaibo on 29 August 1970. In the transitional period, hand times were acceptable. His record held until it was beaten by an automatically timed 10.28 by Olympic champion Allan Wells almost 17 years later. The record was beaten intrinsically by an automatic 10.50 set by Delano Meriwether at the Penn Relays in 1979. Four days later, Herrera added the M35 200 metres record at 21.5. That record lasted was tied two years later but not surpassed for almost 6 years.

After his sports career ended, he worked as a coach and as a judge with the Venezuelan Athletics Federation.

== International competitions ==
Year	Competition	Venue	Position	Event	Notes
Representing Venezuela
1961	South American Championships	Lima, Peru	1st	100 m	10.6
1961	South American Championships	Lima, Peru	2nd	200 m	21.6
1961	South American Championships	Lima, Peru	1st	4 x 100 m relay	41.0
1962	Central American and Caribbean Games	Kingston, Jamaica	3rd	100 m	10.49
1962	Central American and Caribbean Games	Kingston, Jamaica	2nd	200 m	21.3
1962	Central American and Caribbean Games	Kingston, Jamaica	1st	4 × 100 m relay	40.0
1962	Ibero-American Games	Madrid, Spain	3rd	200 m	21.6
1962	Ibero-American Games	Madrid, Spain	2nd	4 × 100 m relay	41.6
1963	Pan American Games	São Paulo, Brazil	2nd	100 m	10.59
1963	Pan American Games	São Paulo, Brazil	3rd	200 m	21.23
1963	Pan American Games	São Paulo, Brazil	2nd	4 × 100 m relay	40.71
1963	South American Championships	Cali, Colombia	1st	100 m	10.2
1963	South American Championships	Cali, Colombia	1st	200 m	20.9
1964	Olympic Games	Tokyo, Japan	8th (sf)	100 m	10.4
1964	Olympic Games	Tokyo, Japan	9th (sf)	200 m	21.0
1964	Olympic Games	Tokyo, Japan	6th	4 × 100 m relay	39.5
1965	South American Championships	Rio de Janeiro, Brazil	12th (sf)	100 m	11.1
1965	South American Championships	Rio de Janeiro, Brazil	2nd	4 x 100 m relay	41.3
1965	Bolivarian Games	Quito, Ecuador	1st	100 m	10.4
1965	Bolivarian Games	Quito, Ecuador	3rd	200 m	21.5
1965	Bolivarian Games	Quito, Ecuador	3rd	4 x 100 m relay	41.6
