= Athletics at the 1971 Pan American Games – Men's javelin throw =

Men's javelin throw at the Pan American Games

The men's javelin throw event at the 1971 Pan American Games was held in Cali on 3 August.

== Results ==
Rank	Name	Nationality	Result	Notes
1st place, gold medalist(s)	Cary Feldmann	United States	81.52	GR
2nd place, silver medalist(s)	Bill Skinner	United States	80.36	
3rd place, bronze medalist(s)	Amado Morales	Puerto Rico	76.14	
4	Justo Perelló	Cuba	73.56	
5	Juan Jarvis	Cuba	71.60	
6	Jorge Peña	Chile	69.06	
7	Rick Dowswell	Canada	67.38	
8	Paulo Irene de Faria	Brazil	66.12	
9	Patricio Etcheverry	Chile	65.56	
10	Gustavo Gutiérrez	Colombia	61.30	
	Bill Heikkila	Canada	DNS	
