= Athletics at the 1967 Pan American Games – Men's javelin throw =

Men's javelin throw at the Pan American Games

The men's javelin throw event at the 1967 Pan American Games was held in Winnipeg on 29 August.

== Results ==
Rank	Name	Nationality	Result	Notes
1st place, gold medalist(s)	Frank Covelli	United States	74.28	
2nd place, silver medalist(s)	Gary Stenlund	United States	73.96	
3rd place, bronze medalist(s)	Justo Perelló	Cuba	71.96	
4	Jorge Peña	Chile	69.68	
5	Edmundo Medina	Mexico	69.44	
6	Bill Heikkila	Canada	66.88	
7	Glen Arbeau	Canada	64.86	
8	Jesús Rodríguez	Venezuela	62.50	
9	Rafael Difonzo	Argentina	61.54	
10	Patricio Etcheverry	Chile	61.44	
11	Gustavo Gutiérrez	Colombia	61.36	
12	Ian Barney	Argentina	61.26	
