= Athletics at the 1963 Pan American Games – Men's 100 metres =

Men's 100 metres at the Pan American Games

The men's 100 metres event at the 1963 Pan American Games was held at the Pacaembu Stadium in São Paulo on 27 and 28 April.

== Medalists ==
Gold	Silver	Bronze
Enrique Figuerola; Cuba	Arquímedes Herrera; Venezuela	Ira Murchison; United States

== Results ==
=== Heats ===
Rank	Heat	Name	Nationality	Time	Notes
1	2	Arquímedes Herrera	Venezuela	10.32	Q
2	2	Ira Murchison	United States	10.53	Q
3	2	Irving Joseph	Trinidad and Tobago	10.57	
4	3	Enrique Figuerola	Cuba	10.58	Q
5	2	Affonso da Silva	Brazil	10.64	
6	3	Horacio Esteves	Venezuela	10.65	Q
7	3	Cipriani Phillip	Trinidad and Tobago	10.66	
8	1	Ollan Cassell	United States	10.70	Q
9	1	Gerardo di Tolla	Peru	10.76	Q
10	1	Jorge Derieux	Puerto Rico	10.94	
11	1	Miguel Angel González	Mexico	10.95	
12	2	Manuel Rivera	Puerto Rico	10.96	
13	1	Jaime Frasser	Ecuador	11.00	
	3	Joe Satow	Brazil	DQ	

=== Final ===
Rank	Name	Nationality	Time	Notes
1st place, gold medalist(s)	Enrique Figuerola	Cuba	10.46	
2nd place, silver medalist(s)	Arquímedes Herrera	Venezuela	10.59	
3rd place, bronze medalist(s)	Ira Murchison	United States	10.62	
4	Horacio Esteves	Venezuela	10.64	
5	Gerardo di Tolla	Peru	10.73	
6	Ollan Cassell	United States	10.79	
