= Justo Perelló =

Personal information
- Full name: Justo Pastor Perelló Giralt
- Born: 6 August 1939 (age 86) Jamaica, Manuel Tames, Cuba

Sport
- Sport: Athletics
- Event: Javelin throw

Justo Pastor Perelló Giralt (born 6 August 1939) is a Cuban retired athlete who specialised in the javelin throw. He won several medals at regional level.

His personal best with the old model javelin is 74.74 metres set in San Juan in 1966.

== International competitions ==
Year	Competition	Venue	Position	Event	Notes
Representing Cuba
1966	Central American and Caribbean Games	San Juan, Puerto Rico	1st	Javelin throw (old)	74.74 m
1967	Pan American Games	Winnipeg, Canada	3rd	Javelin throw (old)	71.96 m
1970	Central American and Caribbean Games	Panama City, Panama	3rd	Javelin throw (old)	70.52 m
1971	Central American and Caribbean Championships	Kingston, Jamaica	3rd	Javelin throw (old)	71.40 m
1971	Pan American Games	Cali, Colombia	4th	Javelin throw (old)	73.56 m
