= Danilo Žerjal =

Track and field athlete

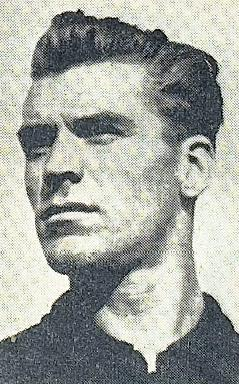

Personal information
- Nationality: Italian, Yugoslav, Venezuelan
- Born: 11 February 1919 Duttogliano, Kingdom of Italy
- Died: 26 August 1984 (aged 65) Caracas, Venezuela

Sport
- Sport: Athletics
- Events: Discus throw, hammer throw
- Club: Fiamme Gialle (1939–43); AK Partizan (1945–50); AD Kladivar (1951–52); Gallaratese (1952–57)

Achievements and titles
- Olympic finals: 1948 Summer Olympics
- Personal best: 51.61 m (1949)
Medal record
Representing Venezuela
South American Championships
Gold medal – first place	1961 Lima	Hammer throw
Gold medal – first place	1963 Cali	Hammer throw
Silver medal – second place	1963 Cali	Discus throw
Central American and Caribbean Games
Gold medal – first place	1959 Caracas	Hammer throw
Gold medal – first place	1959 Caracas	Discus throw
Silver medal – second place	1962 Kingston	Hammer throw
Bronze medal – third place	1962 Kingston	Discus throw
Bolivarian Games
Gold medal – first place	1961 Barranquilla	Hammer throw
Gold medal – first place	1965 Quito	Hammer throw
Bronze medal – third place	1961 Barranquilla	Discus throw

Danilo Žerjal (11 February 1919 – 26 August 1984), later also known as Daniel Cereali, was a Slovenian athlete who competed for Yugoslavia and Venezuela in discus throw and hammer throw events. He competed for Yugoslavia in the 1948 Summer Olympics. He fled to Italy as a political refugee in 1952. He competed for Venezuela in the 1959 Pan American Games.

== Achievements ==
Year	Competition	Venue	Position	Event	Notes
Representing Yugoslavia
1946	European Championships	Oslo, Norway	10th	Discus throw	44.31 m
1948	Olympic Games	London, United Kingdom	16th (q)	Discus throw	43.07 m
1950	European Championships	Brussels, Belgium	9th	Discus throw	45.92 m
Representing Venezuela
1959	Central American and Caribbean Games	Caracas, Venezuela	1st	Discus throw	44.95 m
1959	Central American and Caribbean Games	Caracas, Venezuela	1st	Hammer throw	51.17 m
1959	Pan American Games	Chicago, United States	8th	Discus throw	44.07 m
1959	Pan American Games	Chicago, United States	6th	Hammer throw	52.73 m
1960	Ibero-American Games	Santiago, Chile	–	Hammer throw	NM
1961	South American Championships	Lima, Peru	5th	Discus throw	46.71 m
1961	South American Championships	Lima, Peru	1st	Hammer throw	52.55 m
1961	Bolivarian Games	Barranquilla, Colombia	3rd	Discus throw	44.09 m
1961	Bolivarian Games	Barranquilla, Colombia	1st	Hammer throw	50.43 m
1962	Central American and Caribbean Games	Kingston, Jamaica	3rd	Discus throw	46.97 m
1962	Central American and Caribbean Games	Kingston, Jamaica	2nd	Hammer throw	52.85 m
1962	Ibero-American Games	Madrid, Spain	6th	Discus throw	45.20 m
1962	Ibero-American Games	Madrid, Spain	5th	Hammer throw	53.60 m
1963	South American Championships	Cali, Colombia	2nd	Discus throw	47.85 m
1963	South American Championships	Cali, Colombia	1st	Hammer throw	56.07 m (CR)
1965	Bolivarian Games	Quito, Ecuador	1st	Hammer throw	51.89 m
