= Athletics at the 1963 Pan American Games – Men's 200 metres =

Men's 200 metres at the Pan American Games

The men's 200 metres event at the 1963 Pan American Games was held at the Pacaembu Stadium in São Paulo on 30 April and 1 May.

== Medalists ==
Gold	Silver	Bronze
Rafael Romero; Venezuela	Ollan Cassell; United States	Arquímedes Herrera; Venezuela

== Results ==
=== Heats ===
Rank	Heat	Name	Nationality	Time	Notes
1	1	Clifton Bertrand	Trinidad and Tobago	21.44	Q
2	1	Gerardo di Tolla	Peru	21.50	Q
3	1	Brooks Johnson	United States	21.76	
4	1	Joel da Costa	Brazil	21.82	
5	1	Didier Mejía	Mexico	22.25	
1	2	Arquímedes Herrera	Venezuela	21.3	Q
2	2	Ollan Cassell	United States	21.3	Q
3	2	Irving Joseph	Trinidad and Tobago	21.7	
4	2	Miguel Angel González	Mexico	22.2	
1	3	Rafael Romero	Venezuela	21.66	Q
2	3	Manuel Rivera	Puerto Rico	21.99	Q
3	3	Jauro Koga	Brazil	22.36	
	3	Enrique Figuerola	Cuba	DNS	
	3	Jaime Frasser	Ecuador	DNS	

=== Final ===
Rank	Name	Nationality	Time	Notes
1st place, gold medalist(s)	Rafael Romero	Venezuela	21.23	
2nd place, silver medalist(s)	Ollan Cassell	United States	21.23	
3rd place, bronze medalist(s)	Arquímedes Herrera	Venezuela	21.23	
4	Gerardo di Tolla	Peru	21.58	
5	Clifton Bertrand	Trinidad and Tobago	21.62	
6	Manuel Rivera	Puerto Rico	22.0	
