= 1961 South American Junior Championships in Athletics =

III South American Junior Championships in Athletics
- Dates: October 15–16
- Host city: Santa Fe, Argentina
- Level: U20
- Events: 18
- Participation: about 56 athletes from 5 nations

The third South American Junior Championships in Athletics were held in Santa Fe, Argentina from October 15–16, 1961.

== Participation (unofficial) ==
Detailed result lists can be found on the "World Junior Athletics History" website. An unofficial count yields the number of about 56 athletes from about 5 countries: Argentina (21), Brazil (13), Chile (14), Peru (5), Uruguay (3).

== Medal summary ==
Medal winners are published. Complete results can be found on the "World Junior Athletics History" website.

=== Men ===
Event	Gold		Silver		Bronze	
100 metres	Iván Moreno (CHI)	10.7	Juan Byers (CHI)	10.7	Juan Hasegawa (PER)	10.8
200 metres	Iván Moreno (CHI)	22.1	Gerardo Di Tolla (PER)	22.2	Juan Byers (CHI)	22.2
400 metres	López Medrano (ARG)	50.7	Jaime Vega (CHI)	50.9	Jorge Vilaboa (URU)	NTT
800 metres	Jaime Vega (CHI)	1:58.8	Luis Alarcón (CHI)	1:59.6	Rogelio Rodríguez (ARG)	1:59.8
1500 metres	Luis Alarcón (CHI)	4:07.8	Hugo Roldán (ARG)	4:10.5	Mario Cutropia (ARG)	4:11.8
3000 metres	Mario Cutropia (ARG)	9:07.2	Horácio Ferreira (BRA)	9:17.2	José Pincheire (BRA)	9:27.0
110 metres hurdles	Hildemar Cimolini (ARG)	15.2	Guillermo Vallanía (ARG)	15.3	João Gonzales (BRA)	15.7
400 metres hurdles	João Gonzales (BRA)	57.4	Manuel Jordán (CHI)	58.5	Santiago Gordon (CHI)	58.8
4 × 100 metres relay	Argentina; Julián Méndez; Guillermo Vallanía; Pedro Pablo Blache; Juan Bagnoli	43.4	Peru; Gerardo Di Tolla; Juan Hasegawa; Roberto Abugattás; Miguel González	43.9	Brazil; Andres Montero; Jauro Koga; Raimundo Silva; Oscar Colombo	44.2
4 × 400 metres relay	Chile; Manuel Jordan; Luis Alarcón; Juan Santiago Gordon; Jaime Vega	3:29.0	Argentina; Hugo Hollman; Pedro Pablo Blache; Guillermo Vallania; Mario López Nodaro	3:29.8	Brazil; Jauro Koga; Castro Pereira; Luís Castro; Oscar Colombo	3:32.0
High jump	Roberto Abugattás (PER)	1.85	José Barros (BRA)	1.80	Luis Cornaglia (ARG)	1.75
Pole vault	Geraldo Morandé (CHI)	3.60	Daniel Argoitía (ARG)	3.60	Eduardo Nakayama (BRA)	3.40
Long jump	Julián Méndez (ARG)	6.78	Carlos Ermter (CHI)	6.57	Jauro Koga (BRA)	6.51
Triple jump	Iván Moreno (CHI)	14.33	Herbert da Silva (BRA)	13.94	Arturo Arancibia (ARG)	13.50
Shot put	José Alberto Vallejo (ARG)	12.91	Cláudio Romanini (BRA)	12.59	Ramón García (CHI)	12.28
Discus throw	Gilberto Matusiak (BRA)	47.98	Cláudio Romanini (BRA)	46.67	Miguel Gesto (URU)	44.28
Hammer throw	Hugo Grazioli (ARG)	49.77	José Alberto Vallejo (ARG)	48.97	Hugo Peña (CHI)	47.84
Javelin throw	José Denis (PER)	53.92	Héctor Ramos (ARG)	51.50	Patricio Etcheverry (CHI)	49.90

== Medal table (unofficial) ==
* Host nation (Argentina)

Rank	Nation	Gold	Silver	Bronze	Total
1	Argentina (ARG)*	7	6	4	17
2	Chile (CHI)	7	5	5	17
3	Brazil (BRA)	2	5	6	13
4	Peru (PER)	2	2	1	5
5	Uruguay (URU)	0	0	2	2
Totals (5 entries)		18	18	18	54
