= Margarita Formeiro =

Argentine sprinter

Personal information
- Full name: María Margarita Formeiro
- Nationality: Argentine
- Born: 31 October 1944 (age 81)
- Height: 1.75 m (5 ft 9 in)
- Weight: 67 kg (148 lb)

Sport
- Sport: Sprinting
- Event: 100 metres
- Club: Gimnasia y Esgrima de La Plata

María Margarita Formeiro (born 31 October 1944) is an Argentine sprinter. She competed in the women's 100 metres at the 1964 Summer Olympics.

== International competitions ==
Year	Competition	Venue	Position	Event	Notes
Representing Argentina
1960	Ibero-American Games	Santiago, Chile	2nd	4 × 100 m relay	48.9
1960	Ibero-American Games	Santiago, Chile	–	High jump	NM
1962	Ibero-American Games	Madrid, Spain	5th (h)	100 m	12.5^{1}
1962	Ibero-American Games	Madrid, Spain	2nd	4 × 100 m relay	48.9
1963	South American Championships	Cali, Colombia	2nd	100 m	12.1
1963	South American Championships	Cali, Colombia	2nd	4 × 100 m relay	47.8
1964	Olympic Games	Tokyo, Japan	35th (h)	100 m	12.2
1964	Olympic Games	Tokyo, Japan	10th (h)	4 × 100 m relay	46.7

^{1}Disqualified in the final

== Personal bests ==
- 100 metres – 11.9h (1964)
