= Iván Moreno (sprinter) =

Chilean sprinter and long jumper (born 1942)

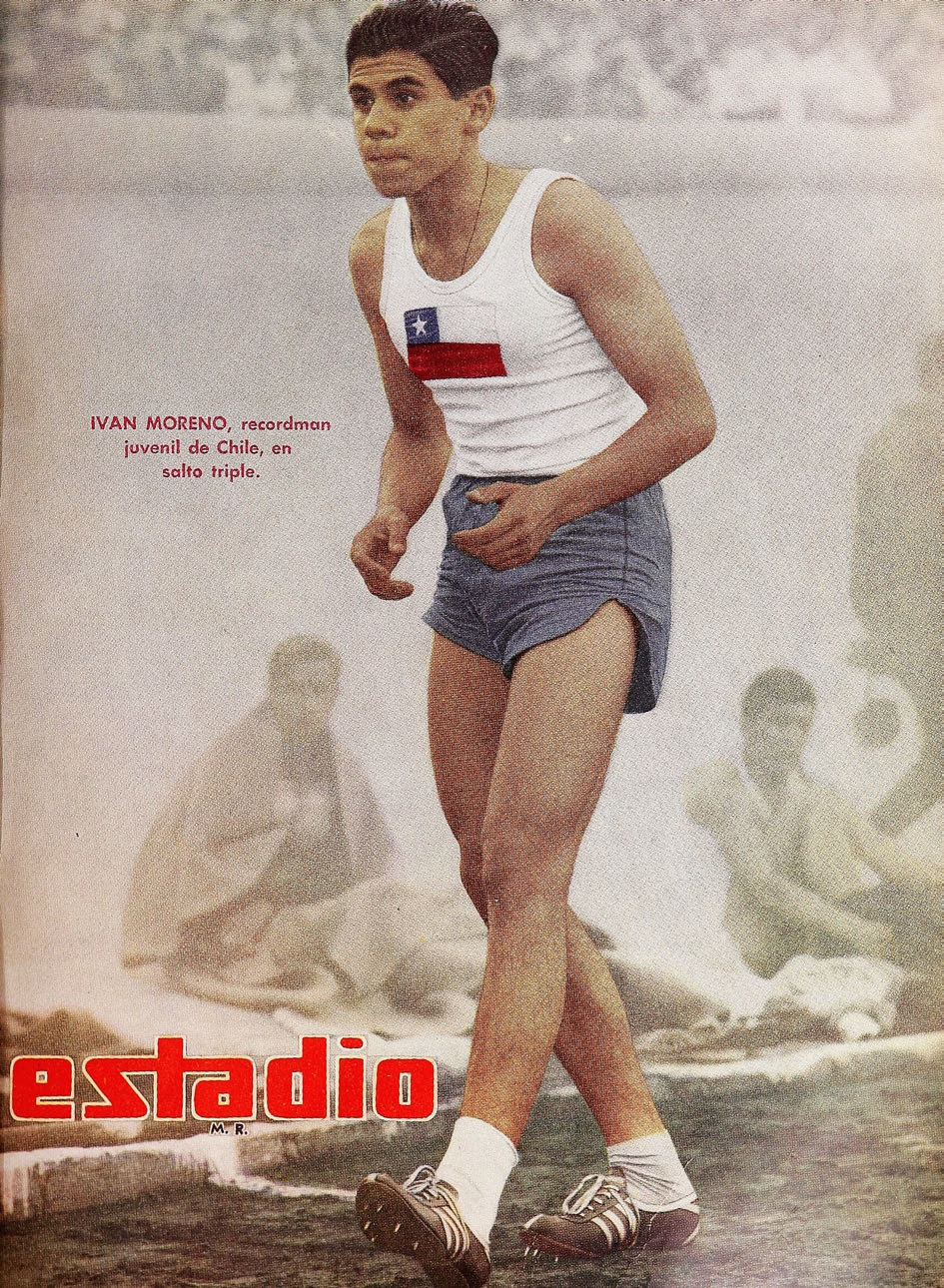

Personal information
- Full name: Iván Moreno López
- Born: 14 January 1942 (age 84) Santiago, Chile
- Height: 1.68 m (5 ft 6 in)
- Weight: 65 kg (143 lb)

Sport
- Sport: Sprinting
- Events: 100 m, 200 m, long jump

Iván Moreno López (born 14 January 1942) is a Chilean sprinter and long jumper. He competed in the 100 metres at the 1964 Summer Olympics and the 1968 Summer Olympics. In 2022, Moreno won first place in the New York Marathon, category 80-89 years. He completed the 42,195 kilometers in 4 hours, 47 minutes and 17 seconds.

== International competitions ==
| Year | Competition | Venue | Position | Event | Notes |
Representing Chile
| 1960 | South American Junior Championships | Santiago, Chile | 2nd | 100 m | 11.2 |
| 1960 | South American Junior Championships | Santiago, Chile | 2nd | 200 m | 22.6 |
| 1960 | South American Junior Championships | Santiago, Chile | 2nd | 4 × 100 m relay | 42.5 |
| 1960 | South American Junior Championships | Santiago, Chile | 1st | Triple jump | 14.30 m |
| 1961 | South American Championships | Lima, Peru | 9th (h) | 100 m | 11.1 |
| 1961 | South American Championships | Lima, Peru | 8th (sf) | 200 m | 22.5 |
| 1961 | South American Championships | Lima, Peru | 4th | 4 × 100 m relay | 42.5 |
| 1961 | South American Junior Championships | Santa Fe, Argentina | 1st | 100 m | 10.7 |
| 1961 | South American Junior Championships | Santa Fe, Argentina | 1st | 200 m | 22.1 |
| 1961 | South American Junior Championships | Santa Fe, Argentina | 1st | Triple jump | 14.33 m |
| 1962 | Ibero-American Games | Madrid, Spain | 7th (sf) | 100 m | 11.0 |
| 1962 | Ibero-American Games | Madrid, Spain | 7th (h) | 4 × 100 m relay | 43.1 |
| 1962 | Ibero-American Games | Madrid, Spain | 10th | Long jump | 6.90 m |
| 1962 | Ibero-American Games | Madrid, Spain | 8th | Triple jump | 14.01 m |
| 1964 | Olympic Games | Tokyo, Japan | 25th (qf) | 100 m | 10.6 |
| 1964 | Olympic Games | Tokyo, Japan | 23rd (qf) | 200 m | 21.7 |
| 1965 | South American Championships | Rio de Janeiro, Brazil | 1st | 100 m | 10.4 |
| 1965 | South American Championships | Rio de Janeiro, Brazil | 3rd | 200 m | 21.9 |
| 1965 | South American Championships | Rio de Janeiro, Brazil | 4th | 4 × 400 m relay | 3:17.5 |
| 1965 | South American Championships | Rio de Janeiro, Brazil | 1st | Long jump | 7.29 m |
| 1967 | Pan American Games | Winnipeg, Canada | 6th | 100 m | 10.58 |
| 1967 | Pan American Games | Winnipeg, Canada | 8th (sf) | 200 m | 21.13 |
| 1967 | South American Championships | Buenos Aires, Argentina | 1st | 100 m | 10.4 |
| 1967 | South American Championships | Buenos Aires, Argentina | 3rd | 200 m | 21.3 |
| 1967 | South American Championships | Buenos Aires, Argentina | 2nd | 4 × 100 m relay | 41.8 |
| 1967 | South American Championships | Buenos Aires, Argentina | 1st | Long jump | 7.35 m |
| 1968 | Olympic Games | Mexico City, Mexico | 14th (sf) | 100 m | 10.37 |
| 1968 | Olympic Games | Mexico City, Mexico | 11th (sf) | 200 m | 20.84 |
| 1969 | South American Championships | Quito, Ecuador | 1st | 100 m | 10.6 |
| 1969 | South American Championships | Quito, Ecuador | 1st | 200 m | 20.9 |
| 1969 | South American Championships | Quito, Ecuador | 3rd | 4 × 100 m relay | 40.7 |
| 1969 | South American Championships | Quito, Ecuador | 2nd | Long jump | 7.54 m |
| 1974 | South American Championships | Santiago, Chile | 4th | 100 m | 10.6 |
| 1974 | South American Championships | Santiago, Chile | 4th | 200 m | 21.8 |
| 1974 | South American Championships | Santiago, Chile | 5th | 4 × 100 m relay | 41.4 |
| 1974 | South American Championships | Santiago, Chile | 5th | Long jump | 7.10 m |

== Personal bests ==
- 100 metres – 10.37 (1968)
- 200 metres – 20.83 (1968)
- Long jump – 7.55 (1968)
- Triple jump – 14.33 (1961)
