= Athletics at the 1963 Summer Universiade – Men's high jump =

The men's high jump event at the 1963 Summer Universiade was held at the Estádio Olímpico Monumental in Porto Alegre on 8 September 1963.

== Results ==
Rank	Athlete	Nationality	Result	Notes
1st place, gold medalist(s)	Valeriy Brumel	Soviet Union	2.15	
2nd place, silver medalist(s)	Mauro Bogliatto	Italy	2.09	
3rd place, bronze medalist(s)	Roberto Abugattás	Peru	1.99	
4	Urs Trautmann	Switzerland	1.99	
	Marcos Silveira	Brazil	NM	
