= José Neira =

Colombian middle-distance runner

Personal information
- Born: January 13, 1939 (age 87)
- Height: 1.78 m (5 ft 10 in)
- Weight: 62 kg (137 lb)
Medal record
Men's Athletics
Representing Colombia
Central American and Caribbean Games
| Bronze medal – third place | 1962 Kingston | 800 metres |
| Bronze medal – third place | 1962 Kingston | 1500 metres |
Bolivarian Games
| Gold medal – first place | 1961 Barranquilla | 800 metres |
| Gold medal – first place | 1961 Barranquilla | 1500 metres |

José Gregorio Neira Carvajal (born January 13, 1939) is a retired track and field athlete from Colombia. He competed in the middle-distances, and represented his native country at the 1964 Summer Olympics in Tokyo, Japan.

== International competitions ==
| Year | Competition | Venue | Position | Event | Notes |
Representing Colombia
| 1961 | South American Championships | Cali, Colombia | 2nd | 800 m | 1:52.6 |
| 1962 | Central American and Caribbean Games | Kingston, Jamaica | 3rd | 800 m | 1:54.8 |
| 1962 | Central American and Caribbean Games | Kingston, Jamaica | 3rd | 1500 m | 3:52.6 |
| 1962 | Ibero-American Games | Madrid, Spain | 3rd | 800 m | 1:50.7 |
| 1962 | Ibero-American Games | Madrid, Spain | 4th | 1500 m | 3:53.5 |
| 1963 | South American Championships | Cali, Colombia | 2nd | 800 m | 1:52.9 |
| 1963 | South American Championships | Cali, Colombia | 2nd | 1500 m | 3:54.4 |
| 1964 | Olympic Games | Tokyo, Japan | 41st (h) | 800 m | 1:55.6 |
| 1971 | Pan American Games | Cali, Colombia | 13th (h) | 1500 m | 3:52.28 |

== Personal bests ==
- 800 metres – 1:50.7h (1962)
