= Athletics at the 1959 Pan American Games – Men's discus throw =

Men's discus throw at the Pan American Games

The men's discus throw event at the 1959 Pan American Games was held at the Soldier Field in Chicago on 31 August.

== Results ==
Rank	Name	Nationality	Result	Notes
1st place, gold medalist(s)	Al Oerter	United States	58.12	
2nd place, silver medalist(s)	Dick Cochran	United States	54.44	
3rd place, bronze medalist(s)	Parry O'Brien	United States	51.84	
4	Lambertus Rebel-Bout	Netherlands Antilles	48.07	
5	Hernán Haddad	Chile	46.45	
6	Enrique Horst	Argentina	45.70	
7	John Pavelich	Canada	44.64	
8	Daniel Cereali	Venezuela	44.07	
9	Rodolfo Sedas	Mexico	42.90	
10	Stan Raike	Canada	41.95	
11	Mauricio Rodríguez	Venezuela	40.87	
12	Carlos Rivera	Puerto Rico	40.20	
13	Omar Fierro	Mexico	39.01	
	Isolino Tabordo	Brazil	DNS	
	Alcides Dambrós	Brazil	DNS	
	George Stulac	Canada	DNS	
	Ramón Rosario	Puerto Rico	DNS	
