= Juan Santiago Gordón =

Chilean hurdler (born 1943)

Personal information
- Full name: Juan Santiago Russell Gordón Armas
- Born: 14 January 1943 (age 83) Santiago, Chile
- Height: 1.74 m (5 ft 9 in)
- Weight: 64 kg (141 lb)

Sport
- Sport: Track and field
- Event: 400 metres hurdles

Juan Santiago Russell Gordón Armas (born 14 January 1943) is a Chilean hurdler. He competed in the men's 400 metres hurdles at the 1968 Summer Olympics.

== International competitions ==
Year	Competition	Venue	Position	Event	Notes
Representing Chile
1961	South American Junior Championships	Santa Fe, Argentina	3rd	400 m hurdles	58.8
1962	South American Junior Championships	Lima, Peru	2nd	400 m	50.0
1962	South American Junior Championships	Lima, Peru	1st	400 m hurdles	54.9
1962	South American Junior Championships	Lima, Peru	2nd	4 × 100 m relay	43.2
1962	Ibero-American Games	Madrid, Spain	14th (h)	400 m	50.2
1962	Ibero-American Games	Madrid, Spain	7th (h)	400 m hurdles	55.7
1962	Ibero-American Games	Madrid, Spain	6th (h)	4 × 100 m relay	43.1
1962	Ibero-American Games	Madrid, Spain	6th (h)	4 × 400 m relay	3:28.6
1965	South American Championships	Rio de Janeiro, Brazil	12th (h)	400 m	50.3
1965	South American Championships	Rio de Janeiro, Brazil	6th (h)	400 m hurdles	54.8
1965	South American Championships	Rio de Janeiro, Brazil	4th	4 × 400 m relay	3:17.5
1967	Pan American Games	Winnipeg, Canada	6th	400 m hurdles	52.86
1967	South American Championships	Buenos Aires, Argentina	6th	400 m	48.4
1967	South American Championships	Buenos Aires, Argentina	1st	400 m hurdles	52.1
1968	Olympic Games	Mexico City, Mexico	27th (h)	400 m hurdles	52.4
1969	South American Championships	Quito, Ecuador	3rd (h)	400 m	48.6
1969	South American Championships	Quito, Ecuador	3rd	400 m hurdles	52.8
1969	South American Championships	Quito, Ecuador	3rd	4 × 100 m relay	40.7
1969	South American Championships	Quito, Ecuador	4th	4 × 400 m relay	3:13.9
1971	South American Championships	Lima, Peru	7th (h)	400 m hurdles	55.0
1971	South American Championships	Lima, Peru	5th	4 × 400 m relay	3:25.4
1974	South American Championships	Santiago, Chile	3rd	400 m hurdles	53.5
1975	South American Championships	Rio de Janeiro, Brazil	7th	400 m hurdles	54.0
1975	South American Championships	Rio de Janeiro, Brazil	4th	4 × 100 m relay	41.5
1975	South American Championships	Rio de Janeiro, Brazil	3rd	4 × 400 m relay	3:22.1

== Personal bests ==
Outdoor

- 400 metres – 48.4 (Santiago 1967)
- 400 metres hurdles – 51.3 (Santiago 1967)
