= Athletics at the 1963 Pan American Games – Women's shot put =

Women's shot put at the Pan American Games

The women's shot put event at the 1963 Pan American Games was held at the Pacaembu Stadium in São Paulo on 28 April.

== Results ==
Rank	Name	Nationality	Result	Notes
1st place, gold medalist(s)	Nancy McCredie	Canada	15.32	
2nd place, silver medalist(s)	Cynthia Wyatt	United States	14.27	
3rd place, bronze medalist(s)	Sharon Shepherd	United States	14.10	
4	Vera Trezoitko	Brazil	12.87	
5	Ingeborg Pfüller	Argentina	12.26	
6	Maria Caldeira	Brazil	11.31	
	Jenny Wingerson	Canada	DNS	
	Pradelia Delgado	Chile	DNS	
	Smiliana Dezulovic	Chile	DNS	
	Caridad Agüero	Cuba	DNS	
