= Gerardo di Tolla =

Peruvian sprinter

Personal information
- Full name: Dante Gerardo di Tolla Barraza
- Nationality: Peruvian
- Born: 13 January 1943 (age 83) Lima, Peru
- Height: 171 cm (5 ft 7 in)
- Weight: 66 kg (146 lb)

Sport
- Sport: Sprinting
- Event: 100 metres
Medal record
Men's athletics
Representing Peru
Bolivarian Games
Bronze medal – third place	1965 Quito	100m
South American Championships
Bronze medal – third place	1963 Cali	200m
South American Junior Championships
Gold medal – first place	1962 Lima	4 × 100m relay
Silver medal – second place	1961 Santa Fe	200m
Silver medal – second place	1961 Santa Fe	4 × 100m relay
Silver medal – second place	1962 Lima	4 × 400m relay
Silver medal – second place	1962 Lima	100m
Bronze medal – third place	1960 Santiago	100m
Bronze medal – third place	1960 Santiago	200m
Bronze medal – third place	1960 Santiago	4 × 100m relay
Bronze medal – third place	1962 Lima	200m

Dante Gerardo di Tolla Barraza (born 13 January 1943) is a Peruvian sprinter. He competed in the men's 100 metres at the 1964 Summer Olympics. Di Tolla finished fourth in the 200 metres and fifth in the 100 metres at the 1963 Pan American Games.

== International competitions ==
Year	Competition	Venue	Position	Event	Notes
Representing Peru
1959	Pan American Games	Chicago, United States	7th (h)	100 m	NT
1960	South American Junior Championships	Santiago, Chile	3rd	100 m	11.2
1960	South American Junior Championships	Santiago, Chile	3rd	200 m	22.7
1960	South American Junior Championships	Santiago, Chile	3rd	4 × 100 m relay	43.2
1961	South American Championships	Lima, Peru	14th (h)	100 m	11.3
1961	South American Championships	Lima, Peru	12th (sf)	200 m	22.9
1961	South American Championships	Lima, Peru	5th	4 × 100 m relay	43.8
1961	South American Junior Championships	Santa Fe, Argentina	2nd	200 m	22.2
1961	South American Junior Championships	Santa Fe, Argentina	2nd	4 × 100 m relay	43.9
1961	Bolivarian Games	Barranquilla, Colombia	5th	100 m	11.3
1961	Bolivarian Games	Barranquilla, Colombia	5th (h)	200 m	22.7
1962	South American Junior Championships	Lima, Peru	2nd	100 m	10.8
1962	South American Junior Championships	Lima, Peru	3rd	200 m	22.0
1962	South American Junior Championships	Lima, Peru	1st	4 × 100 m relay	42.1
1962	South American Junior Championships	Lima, Peru	2nd	4 × 400 m relay	3:23.5
1962	Ibero-American Games	Madrid, Spain	8th (sf)	100 m	11.0
1962	Ibero-American Games	Madrid, Spain	10th (sf)	200 m	22.5
1963	South American Championships	Cali, Colombia	4th	100 m	10.7
1963	South American Championships	Cali, Colombia	3rd	200 m	21.2
1963	South American Championships	Cali, Colombia	4th	4 × 100 m relay	42.0
1963	South American Championships	Cali, Colombia	5th	4 × 400 m relay	3:20.1
1963	Pan American Games	São Paulo, Brazil	5th	100 m	10.73
1963	Pan American Games	São Paulo, Brazil	4th	200 m	21.58
1964	Olympic Games	Tokyo, Japan	48th (h)	100 m	10.9
1964	Olympic Games	Tokyo, Japan	45th (h)	200 m	22.1
1965	Bolivarian Games	Quito, Ecuador	3rd	100 m	10.7

== Personal bests ==
- 100 metres – 10.73(1963)
- 200 metres – 21.2h (1963)
