= José Carlos Jacques =

Brazilian athlete (born 1945)

Personal information
- Born: 5 March 1945 (age 80)

Sport
- Sport: Athletics
- Event(s): Shot put, discus throw

José Carlos Jacques (born 5 March 1945) is a retired Brazilian athlete who specialised in the shot put and discus throw. He won multiple medals at regional level. In addition, he represented his country at four consecutive Pan American Games, starting in 1963.

His personal best in the shot put is 17.45 metres set in São Paulo in 1971. In addition, his personal best in the discus throw is 55.04 metres set in Rio de Janeiro in 1978.

== International competitions ==
Year	Competition	Venue	Position	Event	Notes
Representing Brazil
1962	South American Junior Championships	Lima, Peru	3rd	Shot put	14.82 m
1963	Pan American Games	São Paulo, Brazil	5th	Shot put	14.29 m
1963	South American Championships	Cali, Colombia	1st	Shot put	15.08 m
1964	South American Junior Championships	Santiago, Chile	1st	Shot put	15.61 m
1964	South American Junior Championships	Santiago, Chile	1st	Discus throw	43.39 m
1965	South American Championships	Rio de Janeiro, Brazil	1st	Shot put	15.61 m
1967	Pan American Games	Cali, Colombia	5th	Shot put	16.25 m
1967	Pan American Games	Cali, Colombia	6th	Discus throw	49.15 m
1967	South American Championships	Buenos Aires, Argentina	1st	Shot put	16.59 m
1967	South American Championships	Buenos Aires, Argentina	2nd	Discus throw	49.10 m
1967	South American Championships	Buenos Aires, Argentina	3rd	Decathlon	6042 pts
1969	South American Championships	Quito, Ecuador	1st	Shot put	16.88 m
1969	South American Championships	Quito, Ecuador	2nd	Discus throw	50.88 m
1971	Pan American Games	Cali, Colombia	4th	Shot put	17.32 m
1971	Pan American Games	Cali, Colombia	7th	Discus throw	51.16 m
1971	South American Championships	Lima, Peru	1st	Shot put	16.85 m
1971	South American Championships	Lima, Peru	2nd	Discus throw	53.14 m
1974	South American Championships	Santiago, Chile	4th	Shot put	15.72 m
1974	South American Championships	Santiago, Chile	2nd	Discus throw	46.56 m
1975	South American Championships	Rio de Janeiro, Brazil	2nd	Shot put	16.53 m
1975	South American Championships	Rio de Janeiro, Brazil	2nd	Discus throw	49.64 m
1975	Pan American Games	Mexico City, Mexico	5th	Shot put	16.72 m
1975	Pan American Games	Mexico City, Mexico	7th	Discus throw	51.06 m
1977	South American Championships	Montevideo, Uruguay	3rd	Shot put	15.62 m
1977	South American Championships	Montevideo, Uruguay	3rd	Discus throw	46.42 m
1979	South American Championships	Bucaramanga, Colombia	3rd	Shot put	16.20 m
1979	South American Championships	Bucaramanga, Colombia	3rd	Discus throw (1.75 kg)	53.10 m
1981	South American Championships	La Paz, Bolivia	3rd	Shot put	16.31 m
1981	South American Championships	La Paz, Bolivia	1st	Discus throw	52.10 m
1983	Ibero-American Championships	Barcelona, Spain	3rd	Discus throw	51.74 m
1983	South American Championships	Santa Fe, Argentina	5th	Shot put	15.36 m
1983	South American Championships	Santa Fe, Argentina	1st	Discus throw	51.86 m
1987	South American Championships	São Paulo, Brazil	2nd	Discus throw	54.46 m
1988	Ibero-American Championships	Mexico City, Mexico	4th	Discus throw	53.16 m
1989	South American Championships	Medellín, Colombia	2nd	Discus throw	52.88 m
