= Athletics at the 1963 Pan American Games – Men's shot put =

Men's shot put at the Pan American Games

The men's shot put event at the 1963 Pan American Games was held at the Pacaembu Stadium in São Paulo on 27 April.

== Results ==
Rank	Name	Nationality	Result	Notes
1st place, gold medalist(s)	Dave Davis	United States	18.52	
2nd place, silver medalist(s)	Billy Joe	United States	17.77	
3rd place, bronze medalist(s)	Cozme Di Cursi	Argentina	16.26	
4	Ben Rebel Bout	Netherlands Antilles	14.85	
5	José Carlos Jacques	Brazil	14.29	
6	Darcy João Maria	Brazil	13.78	
	Fernando Morales	Chile	DNS	
	Luis Zárate	Peru	DNS	
