= 1962 South American Junior Championships in Athletics =

IV South American Junior Championships in Athletics
- Dates: September 21–24
- Host city: Lima, Peru
- Level: U20
- Events: 18
- Participation: about 91 athletes from 5 nations

The fourth South American Junior Championships in Athletics were held in Lima, Peru from September 21–24, 1962.

== Participation (unofficial) ==
Detailed result lists can be found on the "World Junior Athletics History" website. An unofficial count yields the number of about 91 athletes from about 5 countries: Argentina (19), Brazil (24), Chile (18), Ecuador (9), Peru (21).

== Medal summary ==
Medal winners are published. Complete results can be found on the "World Junior Athletics History" website.

=== Men ===
Event	Gold		Silver		Bronze	
100 metres	Juan Byers (CHI)	10.8	Gerardo Di Tolla (PER)	10.8	Julio Véliz (ECU)	11.0
200 metres	Juan Byers (CHI)	21.2	Miguel González (PER)	21.7	Gerardo Di Tolla (PER)	22.0
400 metres	Gilberto de Jesus (BRA)	49.9	Juan Santiago Gordón (CHI)	50.0	José Holman (ARG)	50.2
800 metres	Alejandro Arroyo (ECU)	1:58.9	Luis Cabrera (ARG)	2:00.3	Rodolfo Valdiviezo (CHI)	2:00.7
1500 metres	Mario Cutropia (ARG)	4:04.8	Alejandro Arroyo (ECU)	4:09.6	Rodolfo Valdiviezo (CHI)	4:12.8
3000 metres	Mario Cutropia (ARG)	8:47.8	Raúl Díaz (ARG)	8:54.5	Geraldo de Oliveira (BRA)	9:08.3
110 metres hurdles	Hildemar Cimolini (ARG)	15.7	Alfredo Deza (PER)	15.8	Felipe Montero (CHI)	15.8
400 metres hurdles	Juan Santiago Gordón (CHI)	54.9				
4 × 100 metres relay	Peru; Gerardo di Tolla; Miguel Carrasco; Félix Garibaldi; Miguel González	42.1	Chile; Mario Baeza; João Brito; Juan Santiago Gordón; Juan Byers	43.2	Ecuador; Julio Véliz; Fernando Haz Monteiro; Luis Pescarello; Rafael Lozano	44.6
4 × 400 metres relay	Argentina; Héctor Rivas; Mario Loschiavo; Carlos Gutman; José Holman	3:22.7	Peru; Jorge Canales; Miguel González; Humberto Reyes; Gerardo di Tolla	3:23.5	Brazil; Luís Pimenta; João Cruz; Oscar Prado; Fernando Dias	3:26.4
High jump	Roberto Abugattás (PER)	2.06	Manuel César (BRA)	1.95	Cristián Errazuris (CHI)	1.90
Pole vault	Daniel Argoitía (ARG)	3.70	Eduardo Nakayama (BRA)	3.50	Alejandro Avalos (CHI)	3.40
Long jump	Julián Méndez (ARG)	6.92	João Brito (CHI)	6.76	Peter Junge (CHI)	6.61
Triple jump	Hugo dos Santos (BRA)	13.96	Carlos Reyes (PER)	13.85	Mario Medrán (ARG)	13.83
Shot put	Gustavo Fuentes (CHI)	15.08	Álvaro Zucchi (BRA)	14.92	José Jacques (BRA)	14.82
Discus throw	Julio Lagos (CHI)	47.40	Ubirajara Ramos (BRA)	46.68	Guillermo Arias (CHI)	46.20
Hammer throw	Guillermo Arias (CHI)	48.79	Paul Hurtado (PER)	45.48	Clovis da Silva (BRA)	44.71
Javelin throw	Patricio Etcheverry (CHI)	58.99	José Denis (PER)	57.04	Guillermo Reátegui (PER)	56.15

== Medal table (unofficial) ==
* Host nation (Peru)

Rank	Nation	Gold	Silver	Bronze	Total
1	Chile (CHI)	7	3	7	17
2	Argentina (ARG)	6	2	2	10
3	Peru (PER)*	2	7	2	11
4	Brazil (BRA)	2	4	4	10
5	Ecuador (ECU)	1	1	2	4
Totals (5 entries)		18	17	17	52
