= Ingeborg Pfüller =

Argentine shot putter and discus thrower (born 1932)

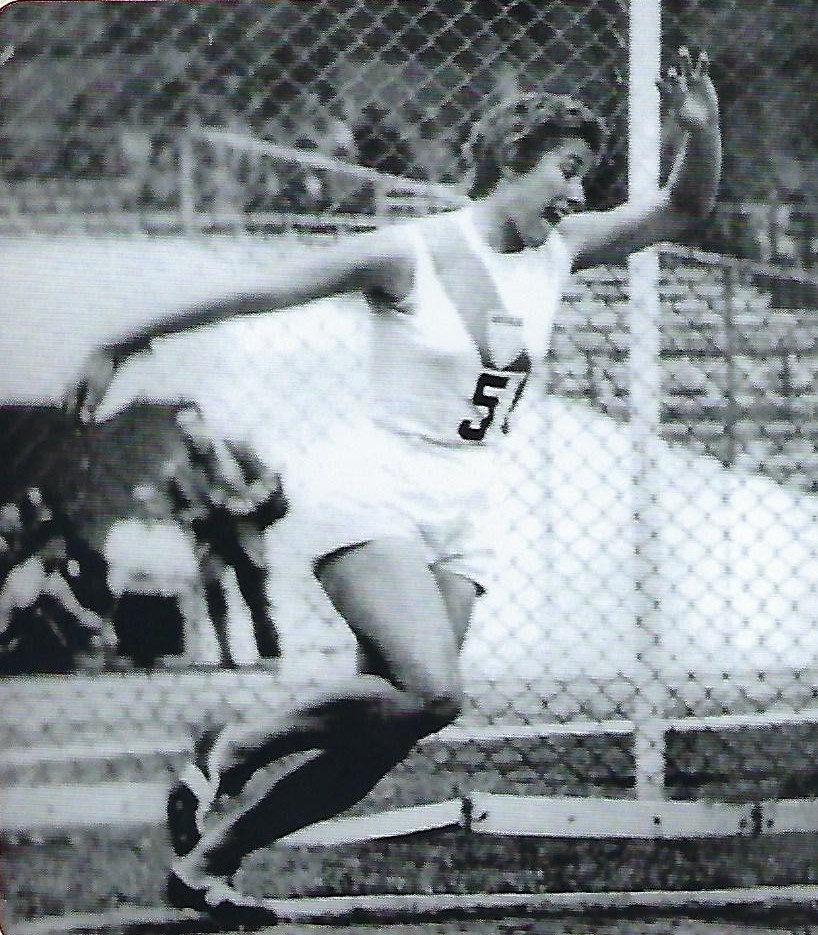
- Pfüller in 1955

Personal information
- Born: 1 January 1932
Medal record
Women's Athletics
Representing Argentina
Pan American Games
Gold medal – first place	1955 Mexico City	Discus throw
Silver medal – second place	1951 Buenos Aires	Discus throw
Silver medal – second place	1963 São Paulo	Discus throw
Bronze medal – third place	1951 Buenos Aires	Shot put

Ingeborg Ella Pfüller (born 1 January 1932) is an Argentine former track and field athlete who competed in the discus throw and shot put. She represented her native country at the 1952 Summer Olympics and won the gold medal in the women's discus throw event at the 1955 Pan American Games in Mexico City, Mexico. She also won the discus throw at the South American Championships in 1961 and 1963.

== International competitions ==
Year	Competition	Venue	Position	Event	Notes
Representing Argentina
1949	South American Championships	Lima, Peru	3rd	Discus throw	36.05 m
1951	Pan American Games	Buenos Aires, Argentina	3rd	Shot put	11.58 m
1951	Pan American Games	Buenos Aires, Argentina	2nd	Discus throw	37.19 m
1952	South American Championships	Buenos Aires, Argentina	2nd	Shot put	11.35 m
1952	South American Championships	Buenos Aires, Argentina	2nd	Discus throw	40.07 m
1952	Olympic Games	Helsinki, Finland	15th (q)	Shot put	11.85 m
1952	Olympic Games	Helsinki, Finland	7th	Discus throw	41.73 m
1953	South American Championships (U)	Santiago, Chile	4th	Shot put	11.07 m
1953	South American Championships (U)	Santiago, Chile	2nd	Discus throw	39.09 m
1955	Pan American Games	Mexico City, Mexico	1st	Discus throw	43.19 m
1960	Ibero-American Games	Santiago, Chile	2nd	Shot put	11.52 m
1960	Ibero-American Games	Santiago, Chile	3rd	Discus throw	38.85 m
1961	South American Championships	Lima, Peru	1st	Shot put	12.41 m
1961	South American Championships	Lima, Peru	1st	Discus throw	41.92 m
1962	Ibero-American Games	Madrid, Spain	2nd	Shot put	12.54 m
1962	Ibero-American Games	Madrid, Spain	1st	Discus throw	44.69 m
1963	Pan American Games	São Paulo, Brazil	5th	Shot put	12.26 m
1963	Pan American Games	São Paulo, Brazil	2nd	Discus throw	47.83 m
1963	South American Championships	Cali, Colombia	1st	Shot put	12.82 m
1963	South American Championships	Cali, Colombia	1st	Discus throw	46.36 m
