= Susana Ritchie =

Argentine sprinter (born 1944)

Personal information
- Full name: Susana Isabel Ritchie
- Nationality: Argentine
- Born: 2 December 1944 (age 81)
- Height: 1.70 m (5 ft 7 in)
- Weight: 56 kg (123 lb)

Sport
- Sport: Sprinting
- Event: 200 metres

Susana Isabel Ritchie (born 2 December 1944) is an Argentine sprinter. She competed in the women's 200 metres at the 1964 Summer Olympics.

== International competitions ==
Year	Competition	Venue	Position	Event	Notes
Representing Argentina
1963	South American Championships	Cali, Colombia	3rd	100 m	12.3
1963	South American Championships	Cali, Colombia	2nd	200 m	25.2
1963	South American Championships	Cali, Colombia	2nd	4 × 100 m relay	47.8
1964	Olympic Games	Tokyo, Japan	23rd (h)	200 m	24.7
1964	Olympic Games	Tokyo, Japan	10th (h)	4 × 100 m relay	46.7

== Personal bests ==
- 100 metres – 11.8h (1964)
- 200 metres – 24.79 (1964)
