= Hernán Barreneche =

Colombian long-distance runner

Personal information
- Full name: Hernán Barreneche Ríos
- Born: July 25, 1939 (age 86) Pereira, Colombia
- Height: 1.76 m (5 ft 9 in)
- Weight: 57 kg (126 lb)
Medal record
Men's Athletics
Representing Colombia
Pan American Games
| Bronze medal – third place | 1971 Cali | Marathon |
Central American and Caribbean Games
| Gold medal – first place | 1962 Kingston | Half Marathon |
Bolivarian Games
| Silver medal – second place | 1961 Barranquilla | Half marathon |
| Bronze medal – third place | 1961 Barranquilla | 10,000 metres |

Hernán Barreneche Ríos (born July 25, 1939, in Pereira, Risaralda) is a long-distance runner from Colombia, who represented his native country at the 1972 Summer Olympics. He won the bronze medal in the men's marathon at the 1971 Pan American Games in Cali, Colombia. He has continued to compete at the World Masters Athletics and for the past 3 Games he has won gold in the marathon.

== International competitions ==
| Year | Competition | Venue | Position | Event | Notes |
Representing Colombia
| 1961 | Bolivarian Games | Barranquilla, Colombia | 3rd | 10,000 m | 34:36.5 |
| 1961 | Bolivarian Games | Barranquilla, Colombia | 2nd | Half marathon | 1:12:29 |
| 1962 | Central American and Caribbean Games | Kingston, Jamaica | 6th | 10,000 m | 32:50.0 |
| 1962 | Central American and Caribbean Games | Kingston, Jamaica | 1st | Half marathon | 1:11:49 |
| 1963 | South American Championships | Cali, Colombia | 3rd | Half marathon | 1:11:29 |
| 1971 | Pan American Games | Cali, Colombia | 3rd | Marathon | 2:27:19 |
| 1971 | South American Championships | Lima, Peru | 2nd | Marathon | 2:32:20 |
| 1972 | Olympic Games | Munich, West Germany | 29th | Marathon | 2:23:40 |

== Personal bests ==
- Marathon – 2:22:58 (1972)
