= Leslie Mentor =

Venezuelan middle-distance runner

Personal information
- Full name: Leslie F. Mentor Maxwell
- Born: February 17, 1938 (age 88)

Sport
- Sport: Athletics
- Event(s): 800 metres, 1500 metres

Leslie F. Mentor Maxwell (born 17 February 1938) is a retired Venezuelan middle-distance runner and later athletics coach. As an athlete, he won several medals at regional level.

== International competitions ==
Year	Competition	Venue	Position	Event	Notes
Representing Venezuela
1960	Ibero-American Games	Santiago, Chile	8th (h)	4 × 400 m relay	3:20.9
1962	Central American and Caribbean Games	Kingston, Jamaica	4th	800 m	1:54.9
1962	Central American and Caribbean Games	Kingston, Jamaica	8th	1500 m	4:00.5
1962	Central American and Caribbean Games	Kingston, Jamaica	5th	4 × 400 m relay	3:19.1
1962	Ibero-American Games	Madrid, Spain	5th	800 m	1:51.3
1963	Pan American Games	São Paulo, Brazil	6th (h)	800 m	1:53.19^{1}
1963	Pan American Games	São Paulo, Brazil	2nd	4 × 400 m relay	3:12.20
1963	South American Championships	Cali, Colombia	3rd	800 m	1:53.1
1963	South American Championships	Cali, Colombia	6th	1500 m	3:59.1
1963	South American Championships	Cali, Colombia	1st	4 × 400 m relay	3:13.0
1965	South American Championships	Rio de Janeiro, Brazil	1st	800 m	1:54.5
1966	Central American and Caribbean Games	San Juan, Puerto Rico	4th	800 m	1:55.1

^{1}Disqualified in the final
