= 1963 South American Championships in Athletics =

- Dates: 29 June–7 July
- Host city: Cali, Colombia
- Venue: Estadio Pascual Guerrero
- Events: 31
- Participation: 175 athletes from 8 nations

The 1963 South American Championships in Athletics were held at the Estadio Pascual Guerrero in Cali, Colombia, between 29 June and 7 July. It was the first time that the competition was held in that country.

== Medal summary ==
=== Men's events ===
Event	Gold		Silver		Bronze	
100 metres	Arquímedes Herrera; Venezuela	10.2 CR	Joe Satow; Brazil	10.4	Affonso da Silva; Brazil	10.7
200 metres	Arquímedes Herrera; Venezuela	20.9 CR	Hortensio Fucil; Venezuela	21.0	Gerardo Di Tolla; Peru	21.2
400 metres	Hortensio Fucil; Venezuela	46.7 AR	Juan Carlos Dyrzka; Argentina	47.6	Víctor Maldonado; Venezuela	48.5
800 metres	Oscar Rivera; Colombia	1:52.2	José Neira; Colombia	1:52.9	Leslie Mentor; Venezuela	1:53.1
1500 metres	Álvaro Mejía; Colombia	3:53.5	José Neira; Colombia	3:54.4	José Azevedo; Brazil	3:55.9
5000 metres	Osvaldo Suárez; Argentina	14:59.8	Harvey Borrero; Colombia	15:00.5	Domingo Amaisón; Argentina	15:01.2
10,000 metres	Osvaldo Suárez; Argentina	31:09.6	Domingo Amaisón; Argentina	31:17.0	Luiz Caetano; Brazil	31:20.9
Half marathon	Luiz Caetano; Brazil	1:09:41	Luis Navas; Colombia	1:09:55	Hernán Barreneche; Colombia	1:11:29
3000 metres steeplechase	Domingo Amaisón; Argentina	9:13.0	Sebastião Mendes; Brazil	9:28.7	José Primo; Brazil	9:29.7
110 metres hurdles	Juan Muñoz; Venezuela	15.0	José Telles da Conceição; Brazil	15.2	Cleomenes da Cunha; Brazil	15.5
400 metres hurdles	Juan Carlos Dyrzka; Argentina	51.0 CR	Víctor Maldonado; Venezuela	51.5	Anubes da Silva; Brazil	51.8
4 × 100 metres relay	Brazil; Joe Satow; Joel Costa; Affonso da Silva; José Telles da Conceição	40.9	Colombia; Jaime Uribe; Francisco Gutiérrez; Pedro Grajales; Leonel Pedroza	41.2	Argentina; Carlos Vampoecke; Juan Carlos Dyrzka; Guillermo Vallania; Carlos Biondi	41.6
4 × 400 metres relay	Venezuela; Aristides Pineda; Leslie Mentor; Víctor Maldonado; Hortensio Fusil	3:13.0 CR	Brazil; Inanadir da Silva; Joel Rocha; Geraldo Costa; Anubes da Silva	3:14.7	Argentina; Mario Rivet; Guillermo Vallania; Juan Stocker; Juan Carlos Dyrzka	3:15.3
High jump	Roberto Abugattás; Peru	1.97	Eleuterio Fassi; Argentina	1.94	Manuel César; Brazil	1.88
Pole vault	Mario Eleusippi; Argentina	4.10 CR	César Quintero; Colombia	3.80	Marcelo de Souza; Brazil	3.70
Long jump	Héctor Thomas; Venezuela	7.22	Juan Muñoz; Venezuela	7.16	Roberto Caravaca; Venezuela	6.97
Triple jump	Asnoldo Devonish; Venezuela	15.09	José López; Venezuela	15.01	Mário Gomes; Brazil	14.90
Shot put	José Jacques; Brazil	15.08	Luis Di Cursi; Argentina	15.06	Dagoberto González; Colombia	14.02
Discus throw	Dagoberto González; Colombia	48.84	Daniel Cereali; Venezuela	47.85	Luis Di Cursi; Argentina	46.37
Hammer throw	Daniel Cereali; Venezuela	56.07 CR	Roberto Chapchap; Brazil	55.08	Orlando Guaita; Chile	54.64
Javelin throw	Héctor Thomas; Venezuela	64.79	Walter de Almeida; Brazil	63.49	Patricio Etcheverry; Chile	63.18
Decathlon	Héctor Thomas; Venezuela	6825	Cleomenes da Cunha; Brazil	6269	Roberto Caravaca; Venezuela	5991

=== Women's events ===
Event	Gold		Silver		Bronze	
100 metres	Erica da Silva; Brazil	12.0 CR	Margarita Formeiro; Argentina	12.1	Susana Ritchie; Argentina	12.3
200 metres	Erica da Silva; Brazil	24.3 AR	Susana Ritchie; Argentina	25.2	Marta Buongiorno; Argentina	25.4
80 metres hurdles	Emilia Dyrzka; Argentina	11.5	Leda dos Santos; Brazil	11.5	Maria Teixeira; Brazil	11.8
4 × 100 metres relay	Brazil; Edir Ribeiro; Ines Pimenta; Leda dos Santos; Erica da Silva	47.6 CR	Argentina; Margarita Formeiro; Marta Buongiorno; Emilia Dyrzka; Susana Ritchie	47.8	Colombia; Gloria Aguirre; Ana Alvarado; Smirna Paz; Amparo Ramos	49.8
High jump	Maria Cipriano; Brazil	1.58	Aída dos Santos; Brazil	1.58	Irenice Rodrigues; Brazil	1.50
Long jump	Mabel Farina; Argentina	5.74	Iris dos Santos; Brazil	5.37	Gisela Vidal; Venezuela	5.31
Shot put	Ingeborg Pfüller; Argentina	12.82 CR	Vera Trezoitko; Brazil	12.43	Maria de Lourdes Conceição; Brazil	12.31
Discus throw	Ingeborg Pfüller; Argentina	46.36 CR	Isolina Vergara; Colombia	39.42	Ingeborg Mello; Argentina	39.05
Javelin throw	Marlene Ahrens; Chile	44.67	Aída dos Santos; Brazil	38.29	Carmen Brea; Venezuela	37.93

== Medal table ==
Rank	Nation	Gold	Silver	Bronze	Total
1	Venezuela (VEN)	10	5	6	21
2	Argentina (ARG)	9	7	7	23
3	Brazil (BRA)	7	12	12	31
4	Colombia (COL)	3	7	3	13
5	Chile (CHI)	1	0	2	3
6	Peru (PER)	1	0	1	2
Totals (6 entries)		31	31	31	93

== Participating nations ==
- Argentina (31)
- Brazil (51)
- Chile (4)
- Colombia (35)
- Ecuador (5)
- Peru (14)
- Uruguay (10)
- Venezuela (25)
