= Patricio Etcheverry =

Chilean javelin thrower (1943–2026)

Personal information
- Full name: Patricio Etcheverry Etchevers
- Nickname: Pedro
- Born: 6 March 1943 (age 83) Santiago, Chile
- Height: 1.73 m (5 ft 8 in)
- Weight: 78 kg (172 lb)

Sport
- Sport: Athletics
- Event: Javelin throw

Patricio "Pedro" Etcheverry Etchevers (6 March 1943 – 12 February 2026) was a Chilean athlete. He competed in the men's javelin throw at the 1964 Summer Olympics.

His personal best in the event is 78.28 metres set in 1971.

== International competitions ==
Year	Competition	Venue	Position	Event	Notes
Representing Chile
1961	South American Junior Championships	Santa Fe, Argentina	3rd	Javelin throw (old)	49.90 m
1962	South American Junior Championships	Lima, Peru	1st	Javelin throw (old)	58.99 m
1963	South American Championships	Cali, Colombia	3rd	Javelin throw (old)	63.18 m
1964	Olympic Games	Tokyo, Japan	24th (q)	Javelin throw (old)	60.77 m
1965	South American Championships	Rio de Janeiro, Brazil	2nd	Javelin throw (old)	64.45 m
1967	Pan American Games	Winnipeg, Canada	10th	Javelin throw (old)	61.44 m
1971	Pan American Games	Cali, Colombia	9th	Javelin throw (old)	65.56 m
