= 1960 South American Junior Championships in Athletics =

II South American Junior Championships in Athletics
- Dates: April 30-May 1
- Host city: Santiago, Chile
- Level: U20
- Events: 18
- Participation: about 74 athletes from 3 nations

The second South American Junior Championships in Athletics were held in Santiago, Chile from April 30-May 1, 1960.

== Participation (unofficial) ==
Detailed result lists can be found on the "World Junior Athletics History" website. An unofficial count yields the number of about 74 athletes from about 3 countries: Argentina (25), Chile (30), Peru (19).

== Medal summary ==
Medal winners are published. Complete results can be found on the "World Junior Athletics History" website.

=== Men ===
Event	Gold		Silver		Bronze	
100 metres	Juan Stocker (ARG)	11.0	Iván Moreno (CHI)	11.2	Gerardo Di Tolla (PER)	11.2
200 metres	Juan Stocker (ARG)	21.9	Iván Moreno (CHI)	22.6	Gerardo Di Tolla (PER)	22.7
400 metres	Juan Carlos Dyrzka (ARG)	49.3	Mario Gastelú (PER)	50.0	Hugo Starosta (ARG)	50.5
800 metres	Eduardo Scamarone (PER)	2:00.6	Jaime Vega (CHI)	2:01.2	Magno Rojas (PER)	2:01.4
1500 metres	Daniel Cortez (CHI)	4:13.1	Johan Keller (CHI)	4:14.2	Oscar Gorrachategui (ARG)	4:15.6
3000 metres	Daniel Cortez (CHI)	9:21.8	Oscar Gorrachategui (ARG)	9:22.0	Jorge Cotril (CHI)	9:22.5
110 metres hurdles	Juan Carlos Dyrzka (ARG)	15.3	José Cavero (PER)	15.7	Raúl Tapia (CHI)	16.3
400 metres hurdles	Juan Carlos Dyrzka (ARG)	54.6	José Cavero (PER)	55.3	Mario Gastelú (PER)	55.4
4 × 100 metres relay	Argentina; Manuel Rodríguez; Víctor Rojas; Godman; Juan Stocker	42.3	Chile; José Feíjo; Rafael Valdés; Iván Moreno; Juan Byers	42.5	Peru; Gerardo di Tolla; Juan Hasegawa; Roberto Alvarado; Mario Gastelú	43.2
4 × 400 metres relay	Argentina; Víctor Rojas; Juan Stocker; Hugo Starosta; Juan Carlos Dyrzka	3:21.5	Peru; Roberto Alvarado; José Cavero; Mario Gastelú; Eduardo Scamarone	3:24.3	Chile; Araneda; Andrés Larraín; Nelson Ubilla; Orlando Vargas	3:28.6
High jump	Ricardo Marrachi (CHI)	1.75	Augusto Castro (CHI)	1.75	Julio Verno (ARG)	1.75
Pole vault	Luis Meza (CHI)	3.90	Ramón Oliva (CHI)	3.60	Gabriel Barceló (CHI)	3.50
Long jump	Sergio Corvacho (CHI)	6.60	Julián Méndez (ARG)	6.49	Víctor Rojas (ARG)	6.37
Triple jump	Iván Moreno (CHI)	14.30	Alfredo Salazar (PER)	14.22	Sergio Corvacho (CHI)	13.60
Shot put	Horacio Beluardo (ARG)	14.75	Luis Bustamente (CHI)	13.96	Patricio Deen (CHI)	13.30
Discus throw	Horacio Beluardo (ARG)	52.06	Manuel Consiglieri (PER)	44.17	Juan Chivilikean (ARG)	43.58
Hammer throw	Pablo Silva (CHI)	47.70	Héctor Núñez (CHI)	47.35	Adalberto Rossi (ARG)	43.30
Javelin throw	Ian Barney (ARG)	54.73	Werne Wich (CHI)	54.42	Daniel Soto (CHI)	48.94

== Medal table (unofficial) ==
* Host nation (Chile)

Rank	Nation	Gold	Silver	Bronze	Total
1	Argentina (ARG)	10	2	6	18
2	Chile (CHI)*	7	10	7	24
3	Peru (PER)	1	6	5	12
Totals (3 entries)		18	18	18	54
