= William Heikkila =

Canadian javelin thrower (born 1944)

Personal information
- Born: 17 August 1944 (age 81) Toronto, Ontario, Canada

Sport
- Sport: Athletics
- Event: Javelin throw

William Heikkila (born 17 August 1944) is a Canadian athlete. He competed in the men's javelin throw at the 1968 Summer Olympics.

Heikkila competed for the Oregon Ducks track and field team in the NCAA.
