= Ollan Cassell =

American sprinter

Personal information
- Full name: Ollan Conn Cassell
- Born: October 5, 1937 (age 88) Nickelsville, Virginia, U.S.
Medal record
Men's athletics
Representing the United States
Olympic Games
Gold medal – first place	1964 Tokyo	4 × 400 m relay
Pan American Games
Gold medal – first place	1963 São Paulo	4 × 100 m relay
Gold medal – first place	1963 São Paulo	4 × 400 m relay
Silver medal – second place	1963 São Paulo	200 m

Ollan Conn Cassell (born October 5, 1937) is an American sprinter in the 1950s and 1960s, winning a gold medal in the men's 4 × 400 m relay at the 1964 Summer Olympics. In his early 30s, Cassell later became the executive director of the Amateur Athletic Union (AAU). Right now he serves as an adjunct professor for Olympic Sports history at the University of Indianapolis and is the president of the Indiana Olympian Association.

Cassell was born in Nickelsville, Virginia. He graduated from Appalachia High School in Appalachia, Virginia.

Cassell won his first AAU championship title in 1957 in 220 yd (200 m).

Cassell took up the quarter-mile when attending to University of Houston. In 1962, he won gold medals in the 400 m and 4 × 400 m relay and a silver medal in the 4 × 100 m relay at the World Military Championships. The following year, at the 1963 Pan American Games, Cassell won two gold medals in the relays and was second in 200 m and sixth in 100 m.

At the Tokyo Olympics, Cassell was a semifinalist in 400 m and ran the opening leg in the American 4 × 400 m relay team, which won the gold medal with a new world record of 3:00.7.

Cassell won his second (and last) AAU title in 440 yd (400 m) in 1965. After that, he retired from sports and started to work as the track and field administrator of the AAU 1965–1972. He was an Executive Director of the AAU 1970–1980 and Executive Director of USA Track and Field 1980–1997. He also was a founding member of the International Athletics Foundation that was created in 1988 and served as vice-president of the International Amateur Athletics Foundation (IAAF) 1976–1999.

He was elected to the United States National Track and Field Hall of Fame as a contributor in 2006.
