= 2023 in New Zealand =

- Decades: 2000s; 2010s; 2020s
- See also: History of New Zealand; List of years in New Zealand; Timeline of New Zealand history

The following lists events that happened during 2023 in New Zealand.

== Incumbents ==
=== Regal and vice-regal ===
- Head of State – Charles III
- Governor-General – Dame Cindy Kiro
Charles III

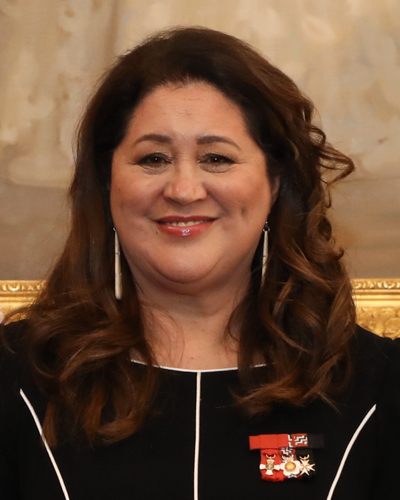
Cindy Kiro

=== Government ===
Legislature term: 53rd New Zealand Parliament until 8 September, then 54th New Zealand Parliament from 5 December.

The Sixth Labour Government, elected in 2017 and 2020, then the Sixth National Government elected in 2023.

- Speaker of the House – Adrian Rurawhe until 5 December, then Gerry Brownlee
- Prime Minister – Jacinda Ardern until 25 January, then Chris Hipkins until 27 November, then Christopher Luxon
- Deputy Prime Minister – Grant Robertson until 25 January, then Carmel Sepuloni until 27 November, then Winston Peters
- Leader of the House – Chris Hipkins until 25 January, then Grant Robertson until 27 November, then Chris Bishop
- Minister of Finance – Grant Robertson until 27 November, then Nicola Willis
- Minister of Foreign Affairs – Nanaia Mahuta until 11 November, then Grant Robertson until 27 November, then Winston Peters
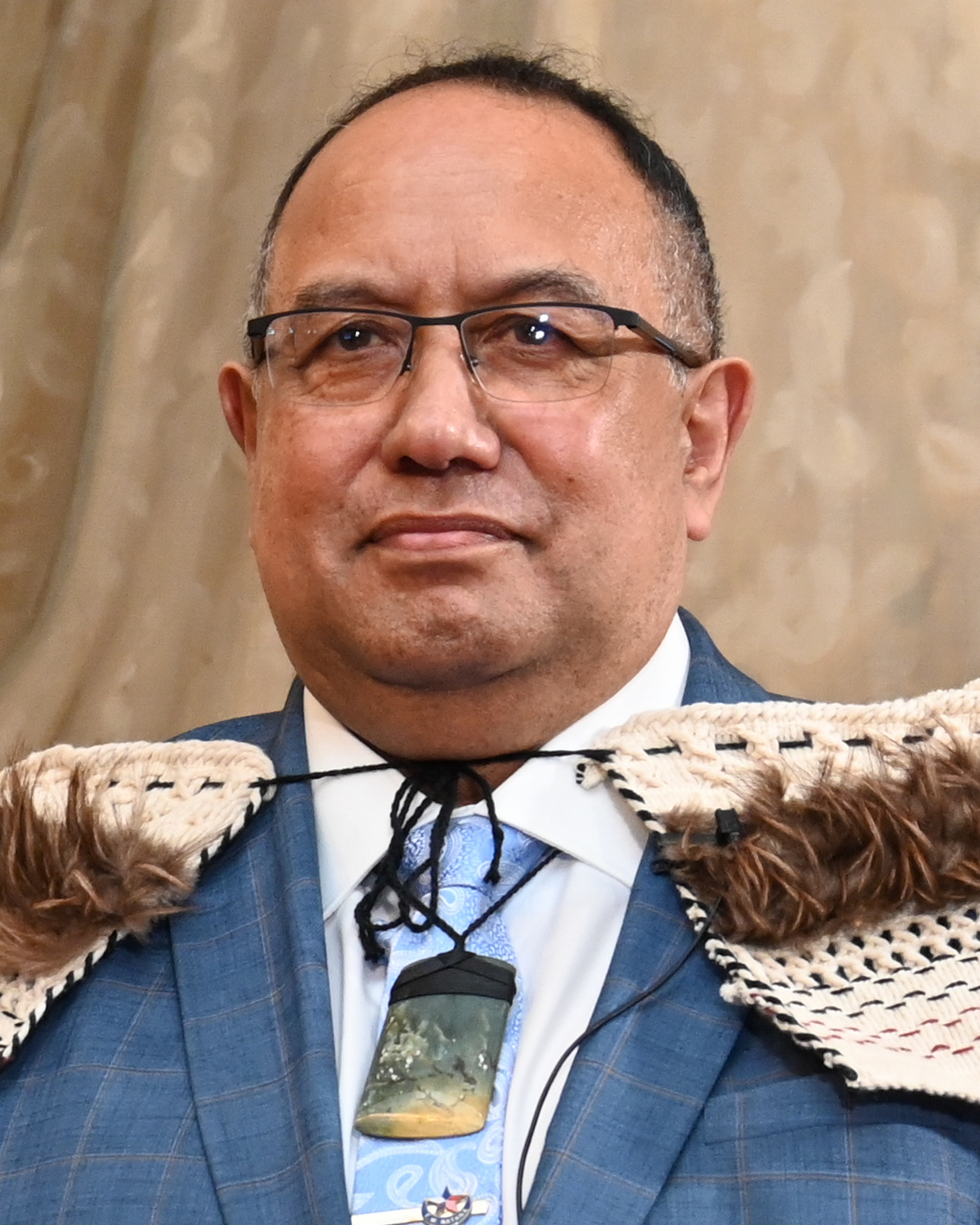
Adrian Rurawhe

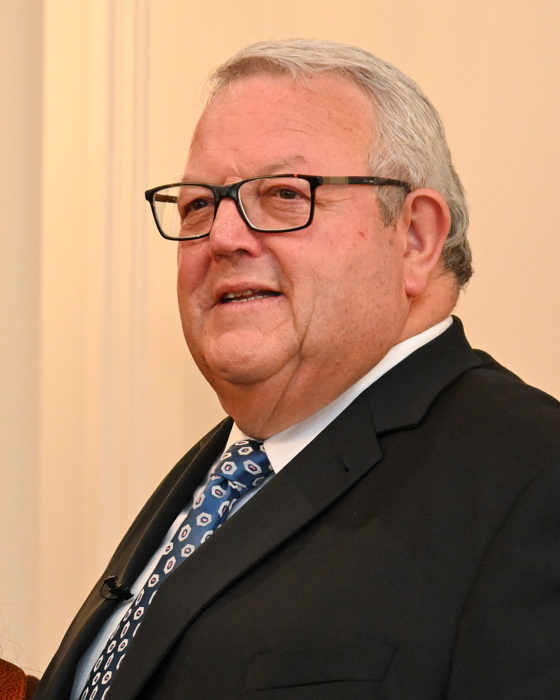
Gerry Brownlee

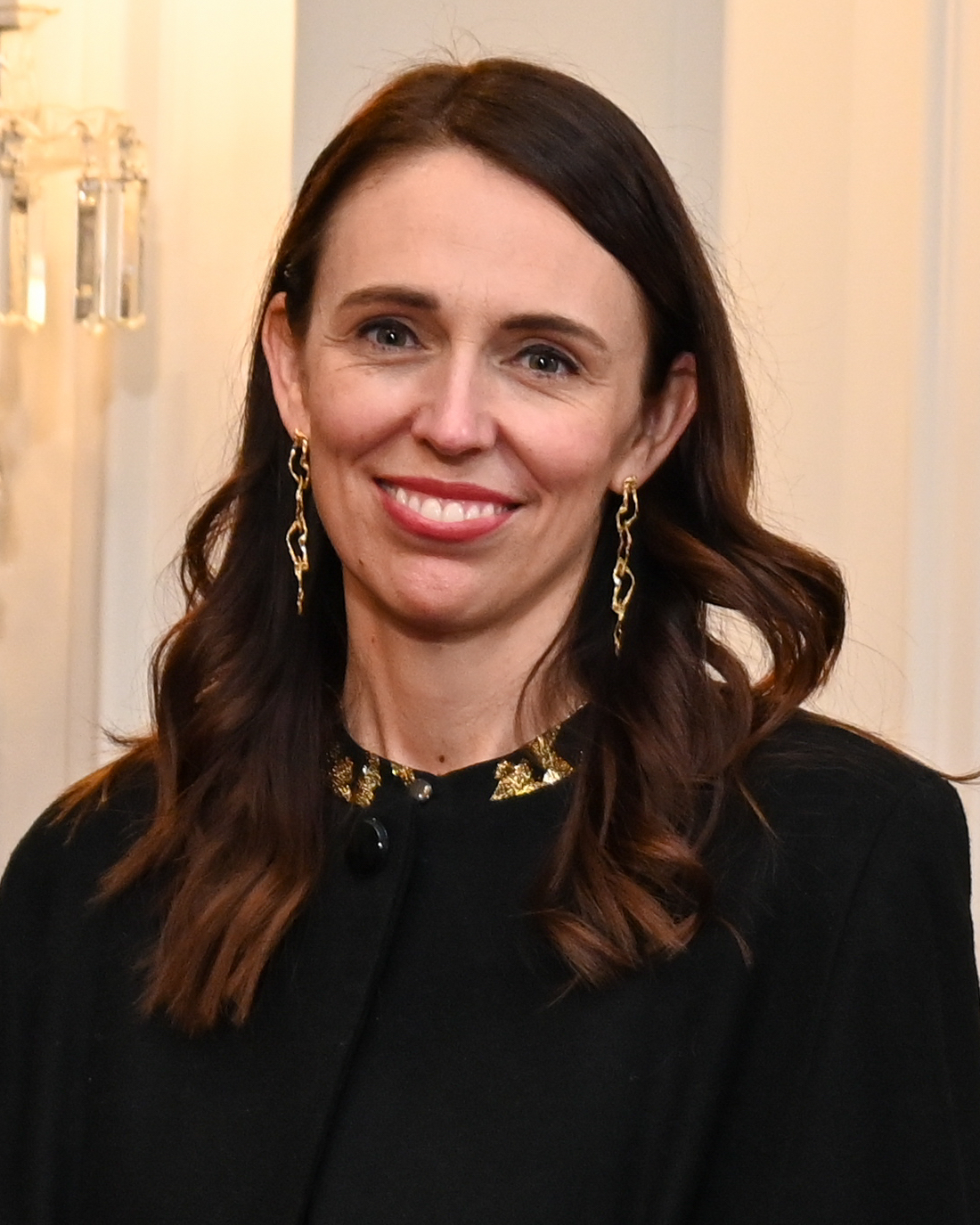
Jacinda Ardern

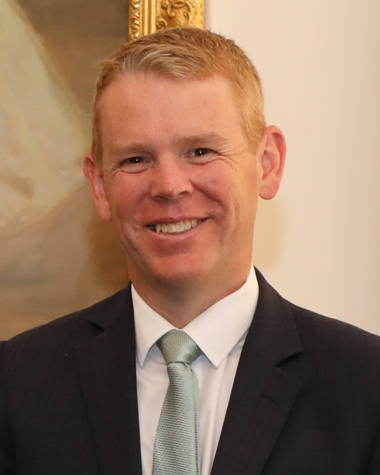
Chris Hipkins

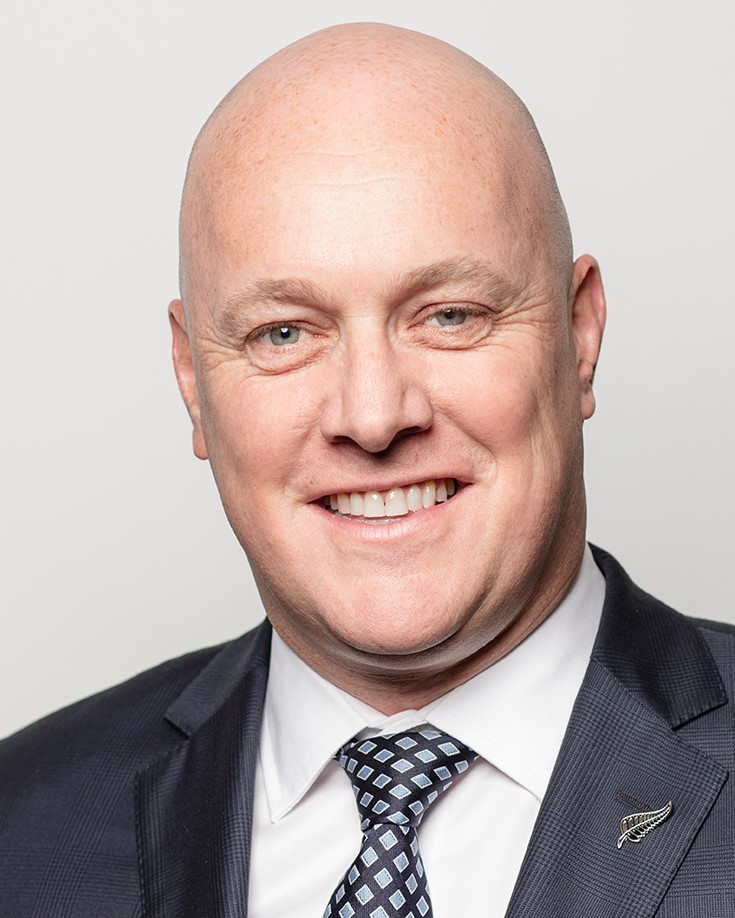
Christopher Luxon

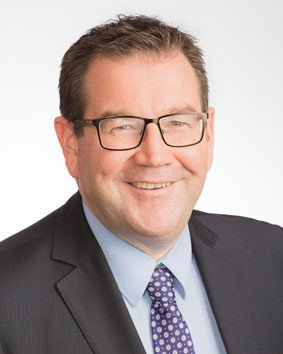
Grant Robertson

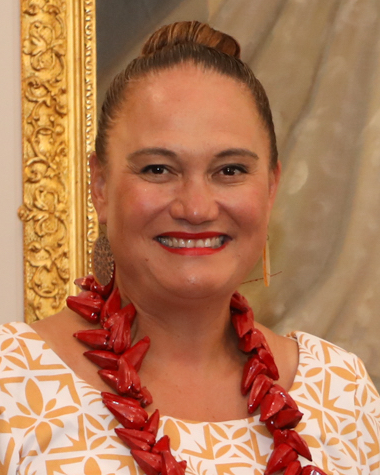
Carmel Sepuloni

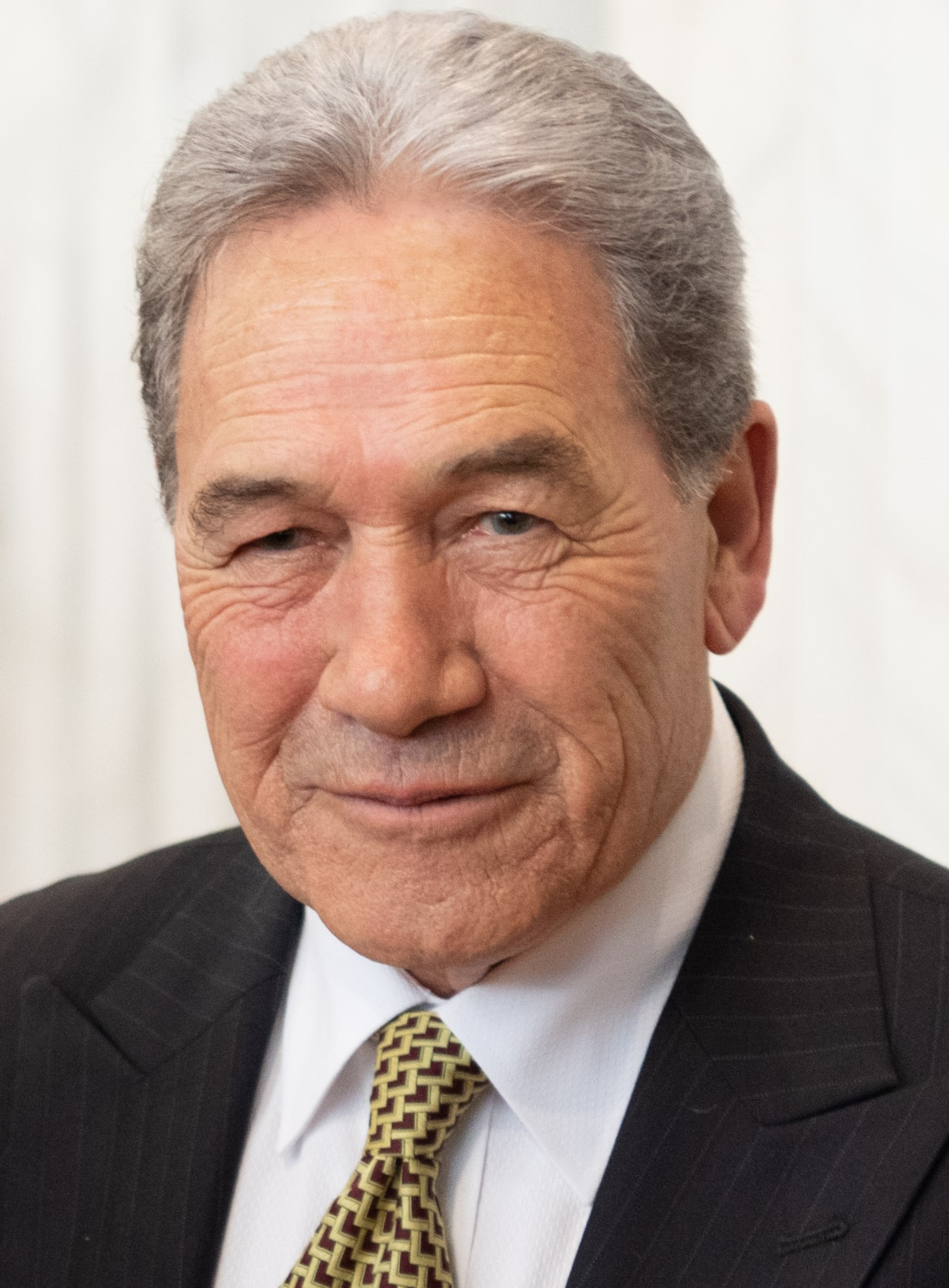
Winston Peters

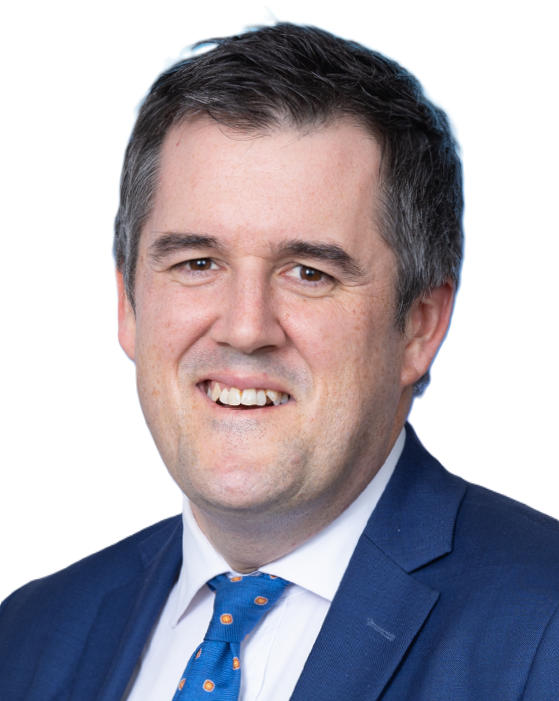
Chris Bishop

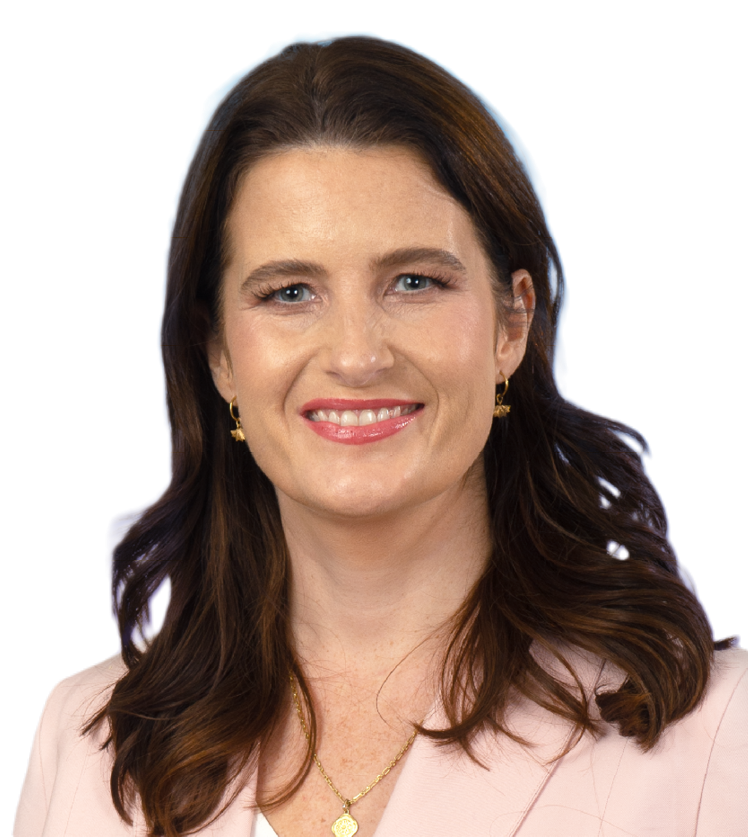
Nicola Willis

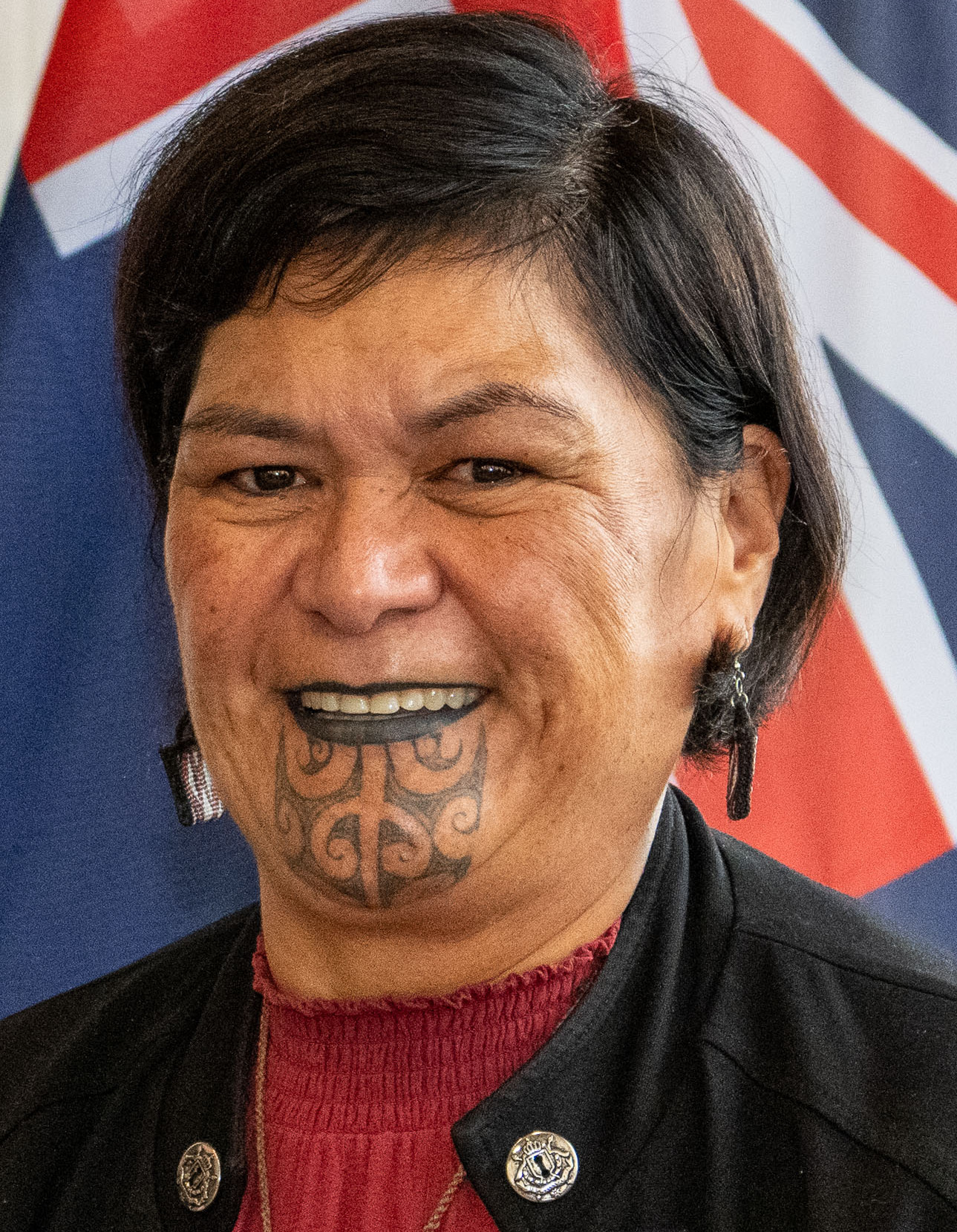
Nanaia Mahuta

=== Other party leaders in parliament ===
- National – Christopher Luxon (Leader of the Opposition) until 27 November
- Labour – Chris Hipkins (Leader of the Opposition) from 27 November
- Green – James Shaw and Marama Davidson
- ACT – David Seymour
- NZ First – Winston Peters from 14 October
- Te Pāti Māori – Rawiri Waititi and Debbie Ngarewa-Packer
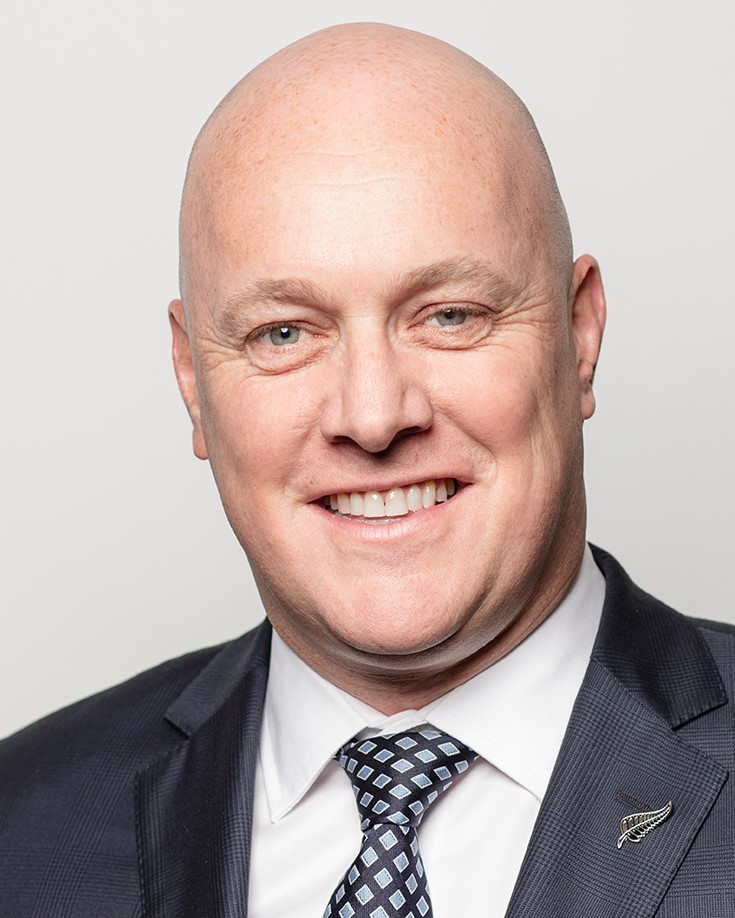
Christopher Luxon

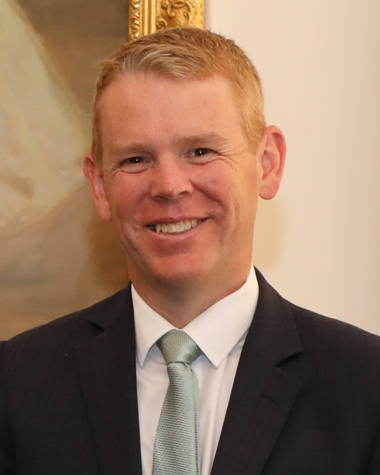
Chris Hipkins

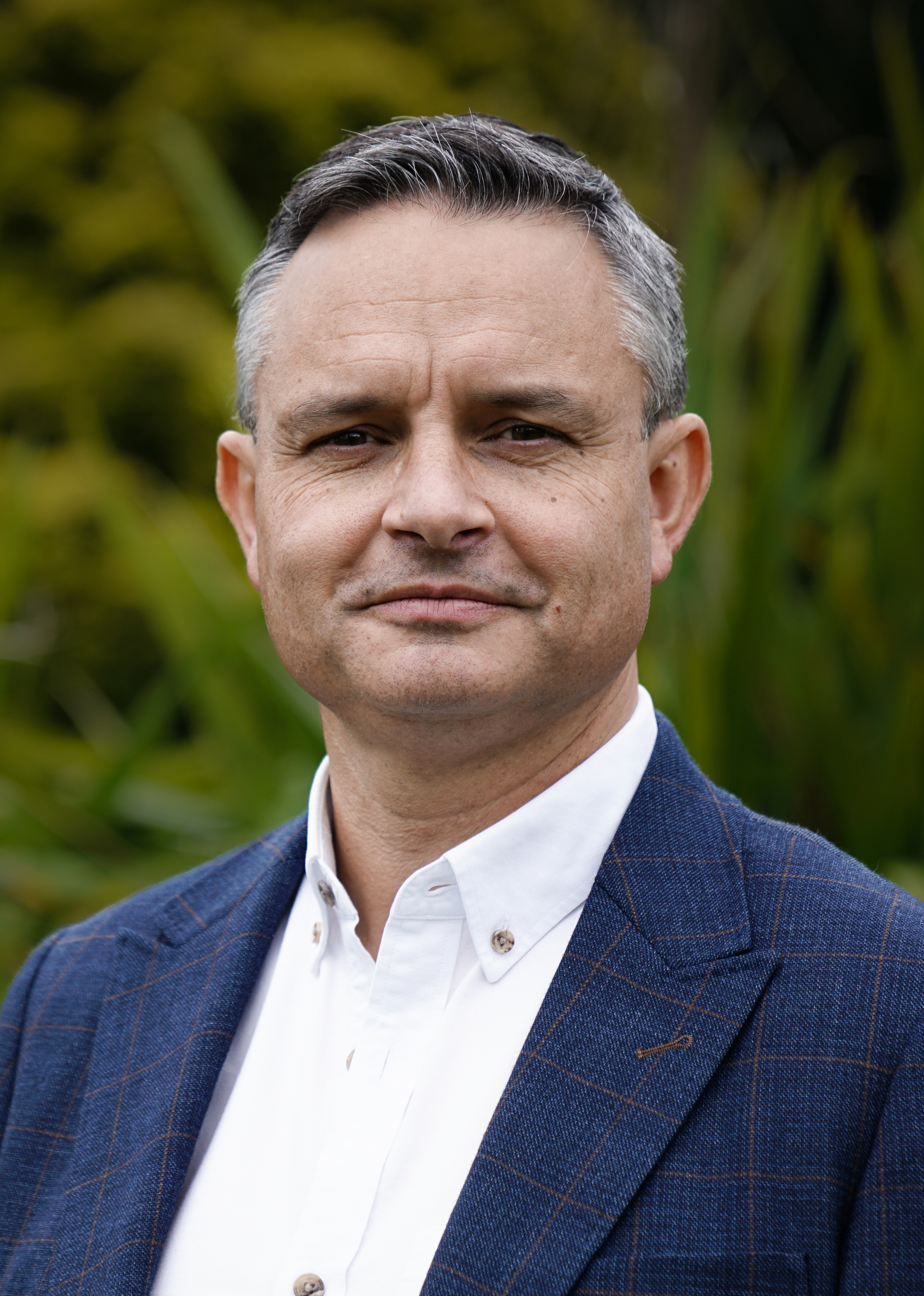
James Shaw

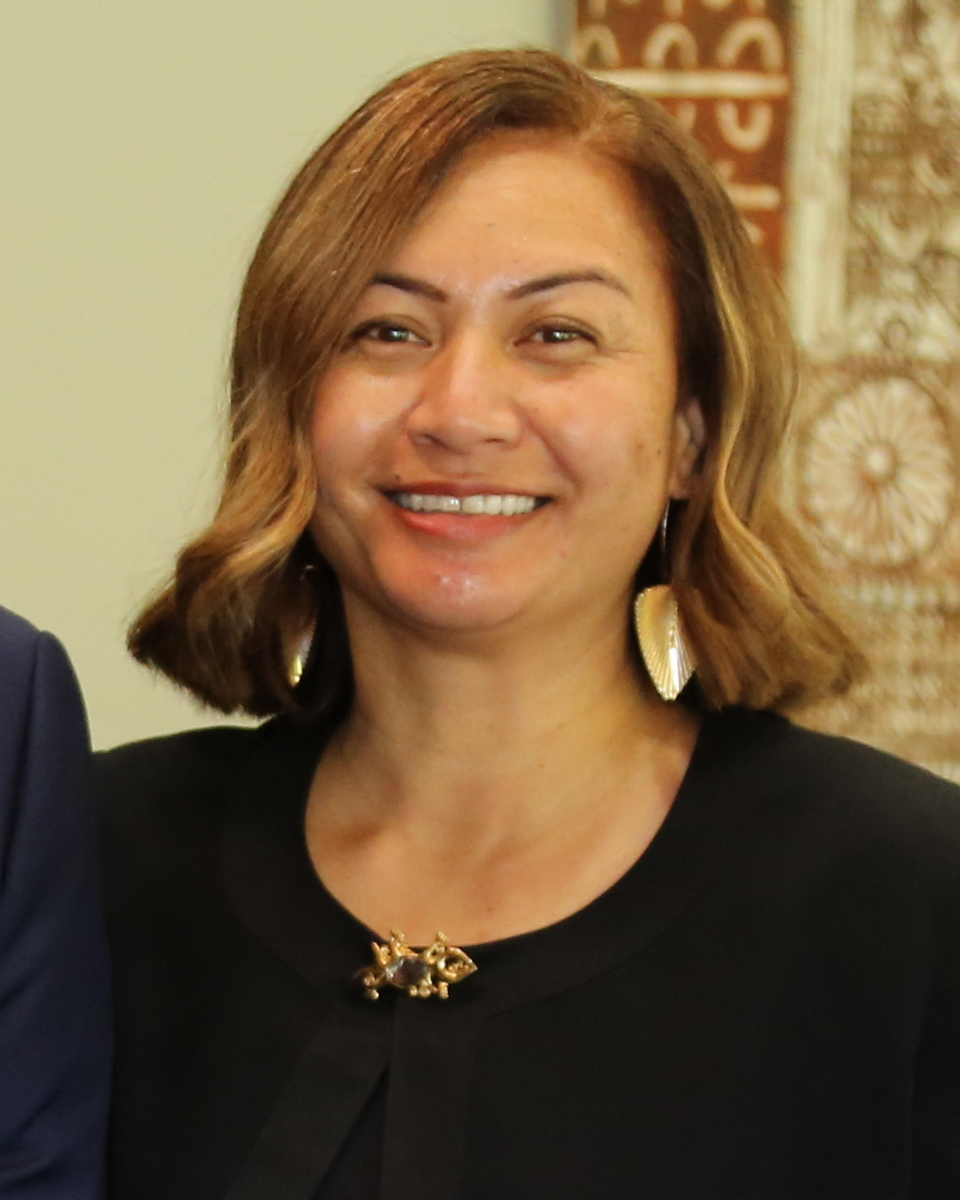
Marama Davidson

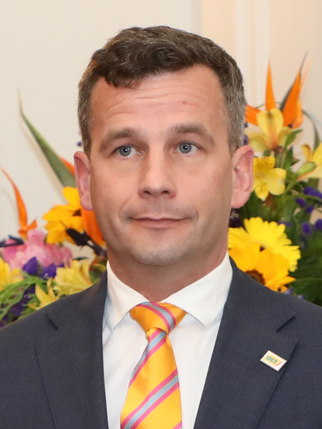
David Seymour

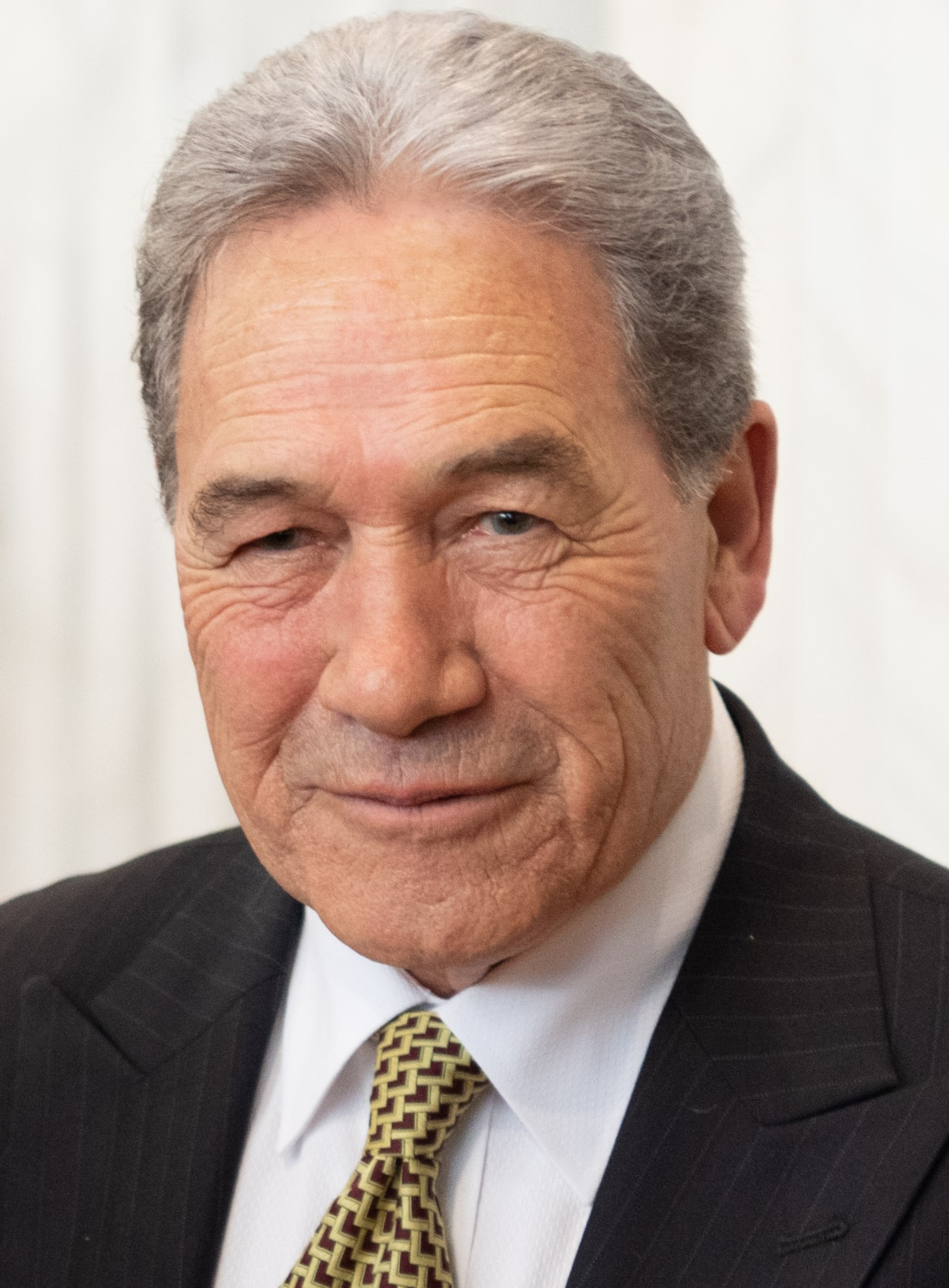
Winston Peters

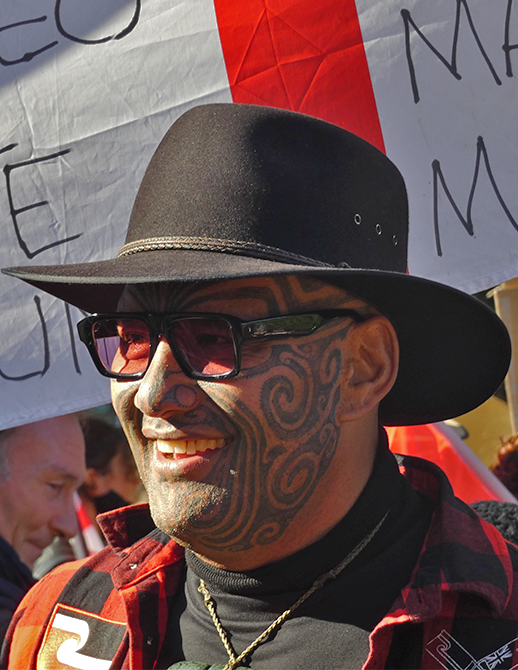
Rawiri Waititi

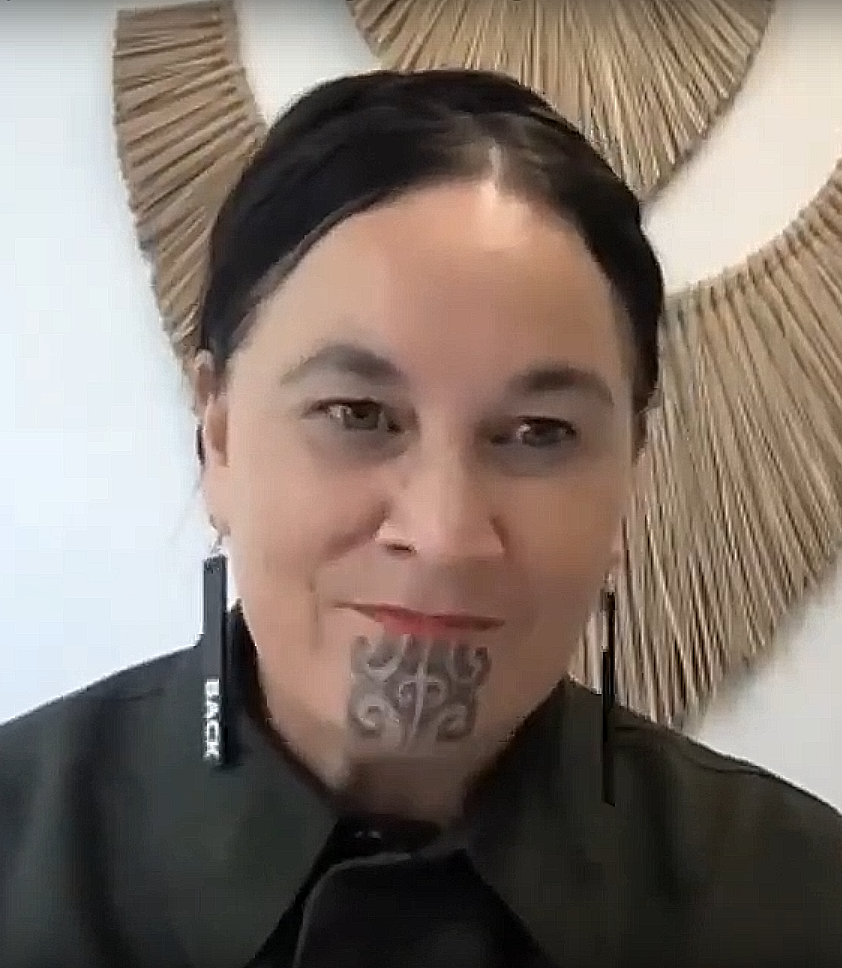
Debbie Ngarewa-Packer

=== Judiciary ===
- Chief Justice – Helen Winkelmann
- President of the Court of Appeal – Mark Cooper
- Chief High Court judge – Susan Thomas until 19 December, then Sally Fitzgerald
- Chief District Court judge – Heemi Taumaunu
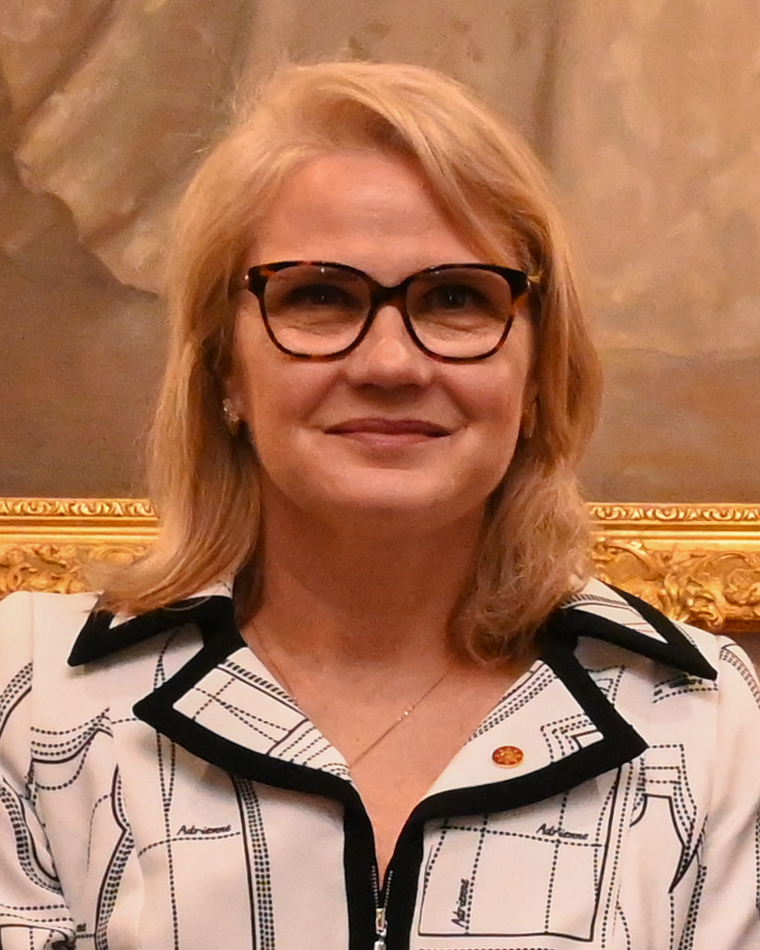
Helen Winkelmann

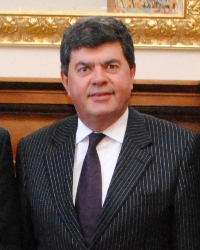
Mark Cooper

Sally Fitzgerald

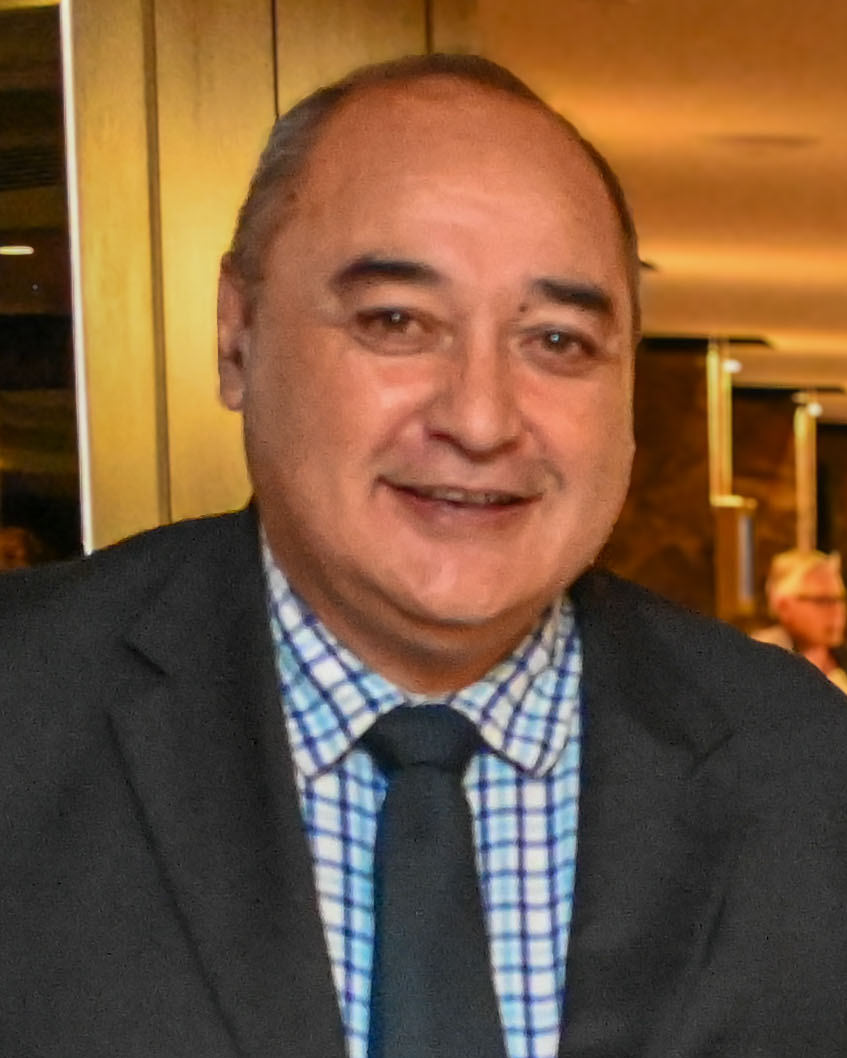
Heemi Taumaunu

=== Main centre leaders ===
- Mayor of Auckland – Wayne Brown
- Mayor of Tauranga – Anne Tolley (as chair of commissioners)
- Mayor of Hamilton – Paula Southgate
- Mayor of Wellington – Tory Whanau
- Mayor of Christchurch – Phil Mauger
- Mayor of Dunedin – Jules Radich
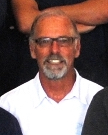
Wayne Brown

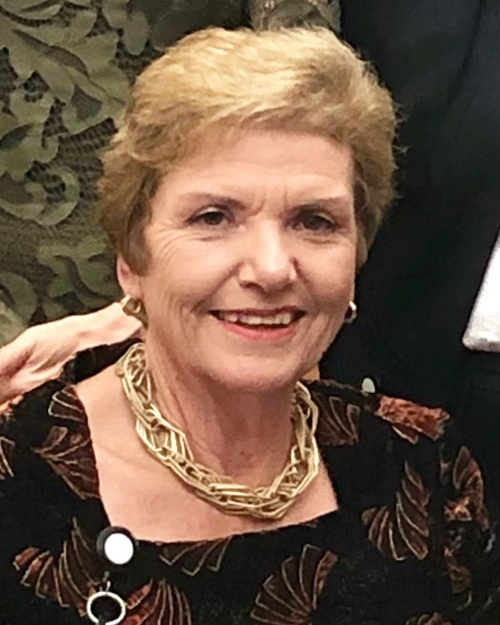
Anne Tolley

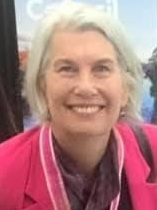
Paula Southgate

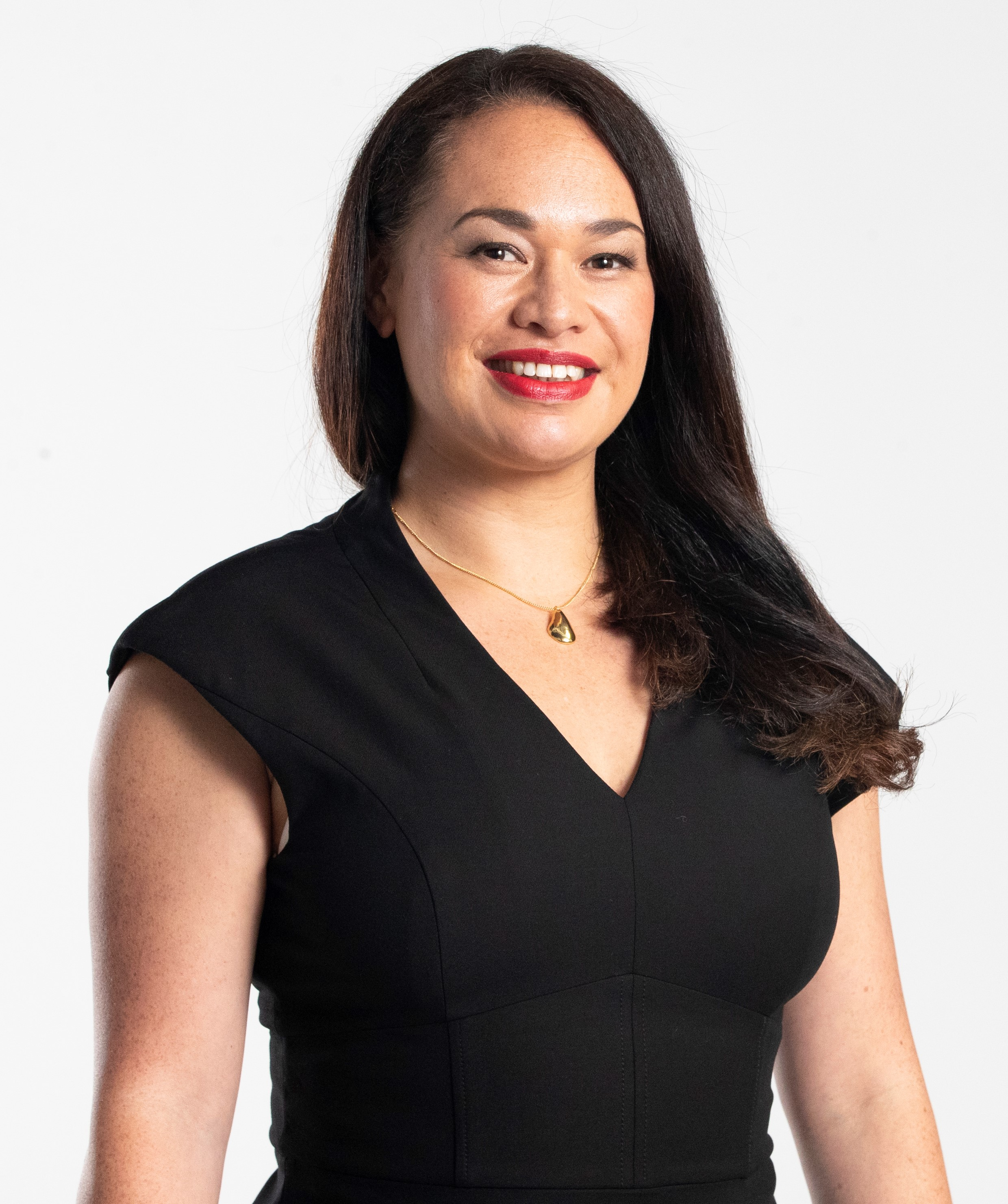
Tory Whanau

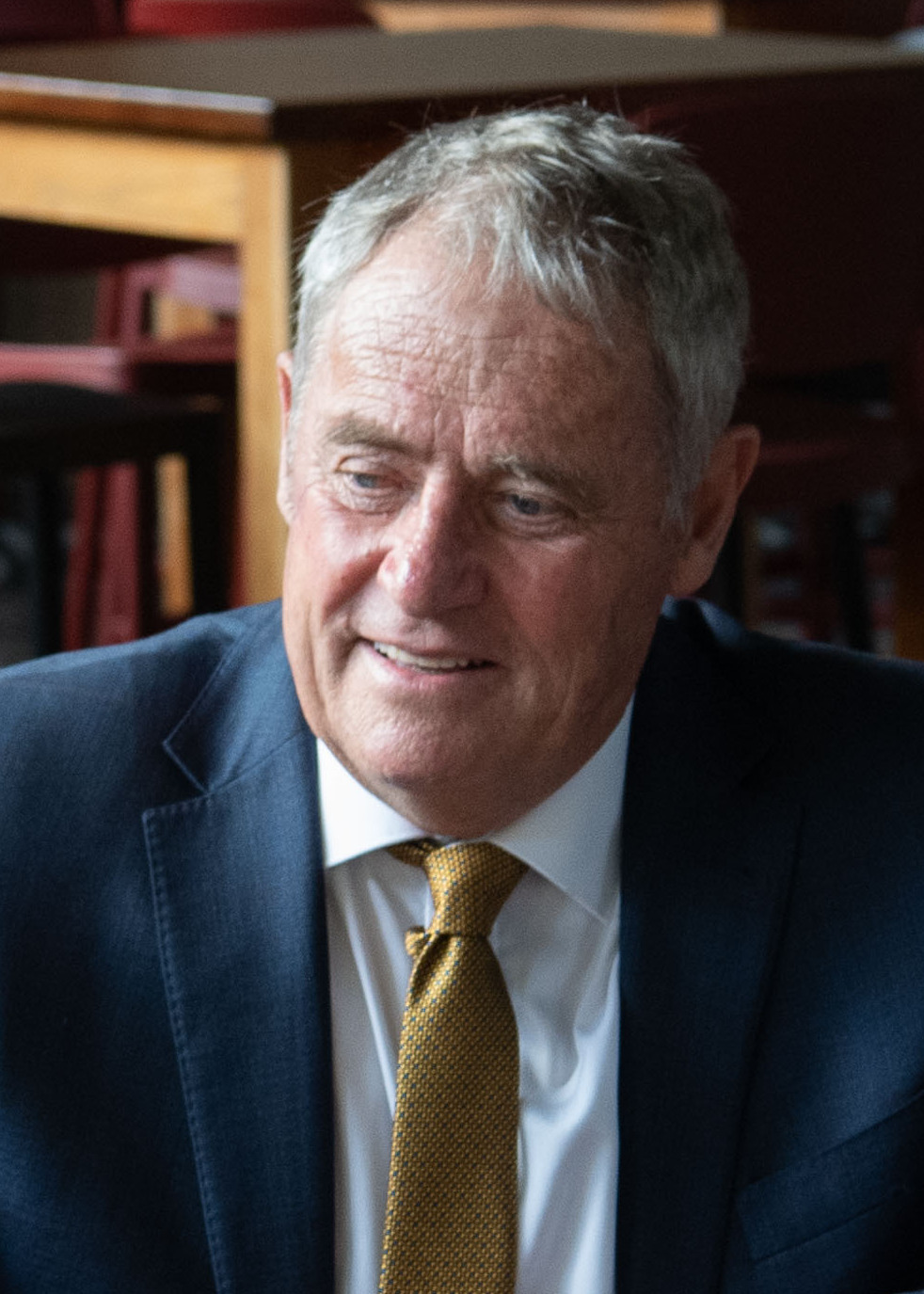
Phil Mauger

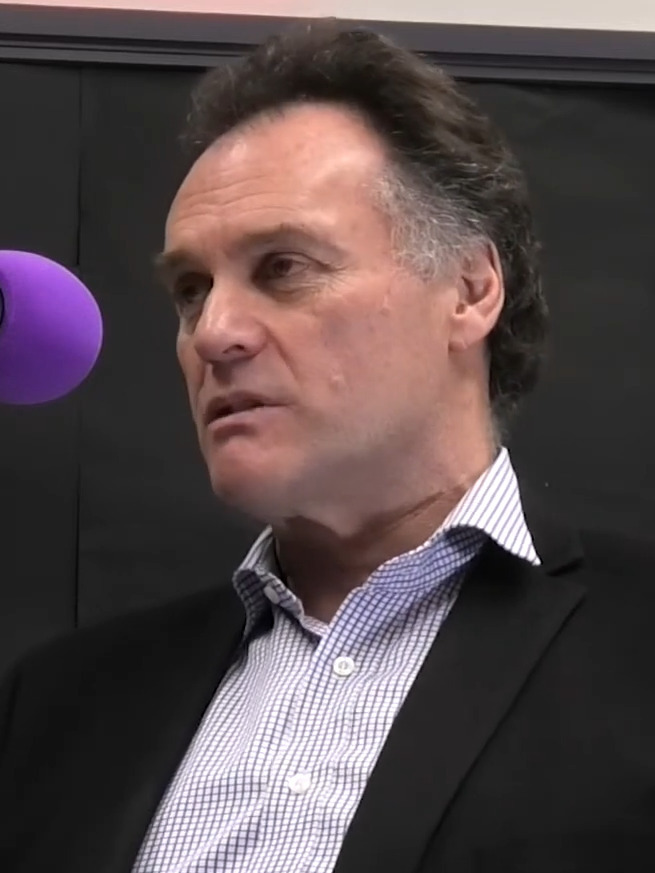
Jules Radich

== Events ==
=== January ===
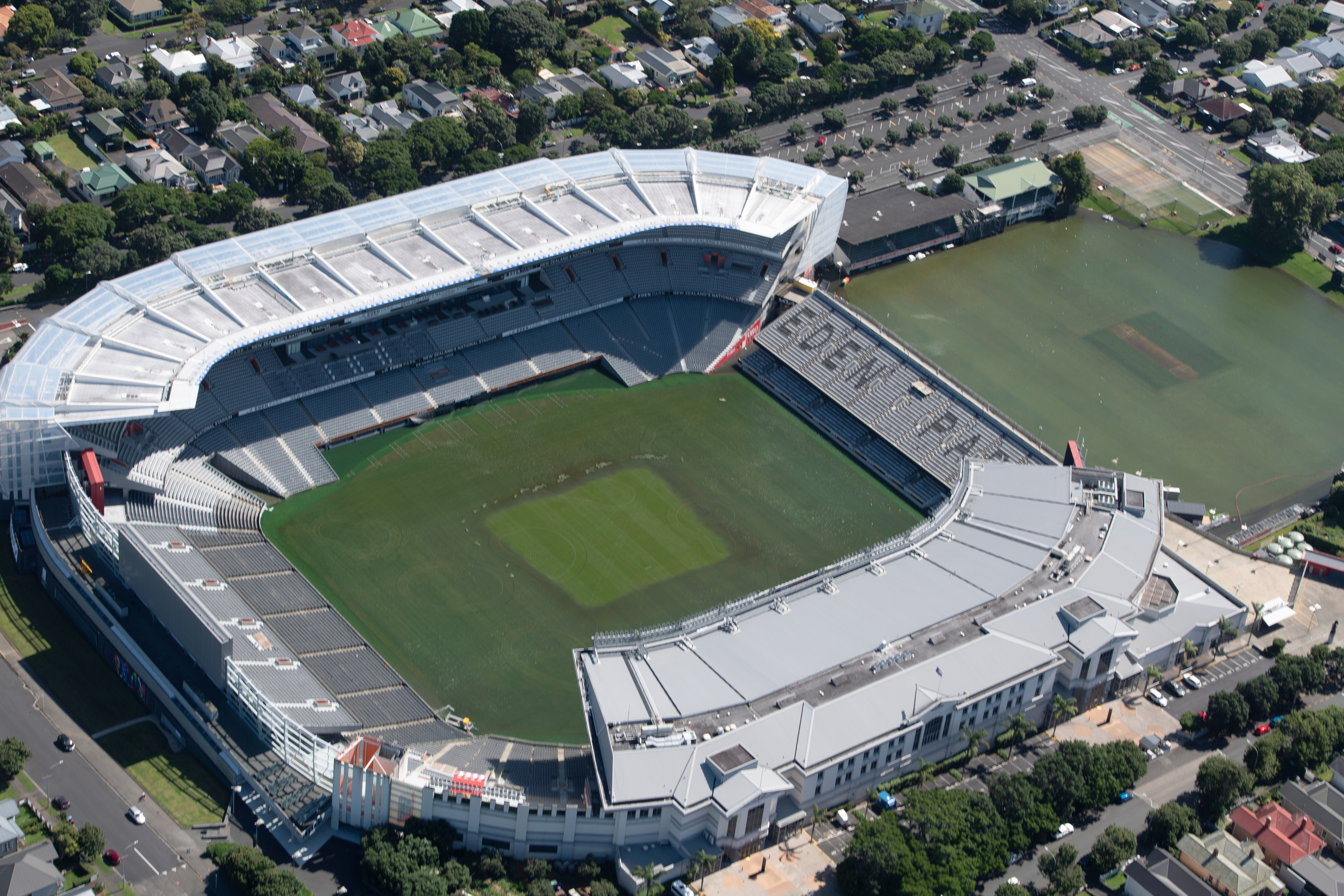
Flooding at Eden Park

- 4 January – Severe weather hits Coromandel and the upper North Island bringing thunderstorms and torrential rain. Holidaymakers are forced to evacuate and continuing severe weather causes numerous landslips.
- 9 January – COVID-19 in New Zealand: The "Kraken" subvariant of Omicron is detected in New Zealand for the first time after genome sequencing of two cases. Health officials are confident the current COVID-19 response is appropriate.
- 10 January – Cyclone Hale impacts the North Island, causing flooding and slips in Coromandel and Gisborne.
- 18 January – A Qantas flight travelling from Auckland to Sydney lands safely after issuing a mayday call.
- 19 January
  - Jacinda Ardern announces her pending resignation as prime minister and Labour Party leader.
  - A wild kiwi egg is laid in Wellington for the first time in more than 100 years.
- 22 January – Chris Hipkins is unanimously elected leader of the Labour Party.
- 25 January – Chris Hipkins and Carmel Sepuloni are sworn in as Prime Minister and Deputy Prime Minister, respectively, at Government House, Wellington.
- 27 January – Torrential rain in Auckland causes widespread flooding, slips, evacuations, and the deaths of four people (from Cyclone Hale).
- 28 January – The Interislander ferry Kaitaki loses power in heavy seas and drifts near rocks off Sinclair Head on Wellington's south coast.

=== February ===
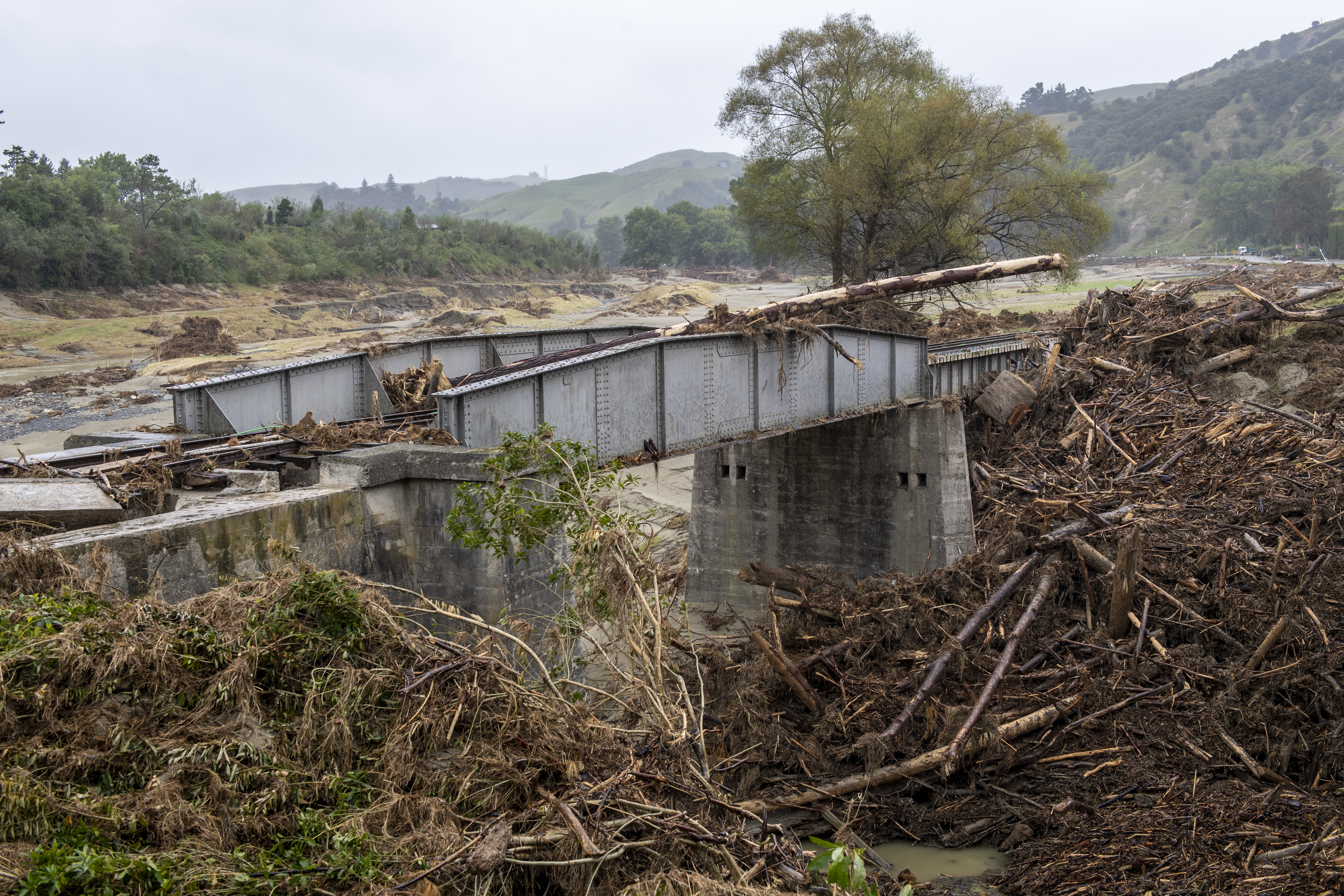
Bridge at Esk Valley in Napier after Cyclone Gabrielle

- 1 February – A second wave of severe weather and torrential rain hits Auckland, worsening the already catastrophic flooding.
- 5 February – Auckland begins a series of significant large-scale clean up operations in the aftermath of catastrophic flooding. Authorities believe the city is now out of danger.
- 8 February – Police Commissioner Andrew Coster announced the seizure of 3.2 tonnes of cocaine floating in the Pacific that was probably destined for Australia, an amount that represents 30 years of consumption in New Zealand.
- 12 February – Cyclone Gabrielle: Thousands of people are left without power as Cyclone Gabrielle makes landfall over the North Island. The regions of Northland and Auckland are put under a state of emergency.
- 14 February
  - Cyclone Gabrielle: A national state of emergency is declared as Cyclone Gabrielle continues to impact the North Island bringing extreme weather, flooding and land slides. A national state of emergency will allow the Government to step in and handle the emergency response.
  - The ngaro huruhuru (native bee) is named the inaugural New Zealand Bug of the Year.
- 15 February
  - Cyclone Gabrielle: Anne, Princess Royal and Vice Admiral Sir Timothy Laurence arrive in Wellington for their tour of New Zealand. The pair's planned military duties in Palmerston North were postponed. Instead, they travelled to the National Crisis Management Centre at the Beehive to meet with staff from agencies involved in the cyclone response. They also conducted the Service of Remembrance at the National War Memorial and paid respects at the United Kingdom memorial.
  - A magnitude 6.0 earthquake hits the lower North Island, 50 kilometres (31 mi) north-west of Paraparaumu at a depth of 54 km. Shaking was felt nationwide and it caused cracks to form in the town's fire station.
- 16 February – Cyclone Gabrielle: New Zealand starts accepting offers of international assistance.

=== March ===
- 1 March – Protesters disrupt a Drag Queen Story Hour event at the Avondale Library in Auckland, forcing its closure.
- 3 March
  - Large climate protests take place across the country as thousands march to demand immediate climate action from the government. The protesters make a number of demands and briefly stage a "sit in" at the Christchurch City Council.
  - The Christchurch Schools Rebuild programme, which is rebuilding and repairing 115 earthquake-damaged schools in greater Christchurch, is given $301 million. This increases the total investment in it to $1.6 billion.
- 7 March – The 2023 census takes place.
- 14 March – Protesters picket the "Queens Telling Stories" event at Christchurch's Turangi Library.
- 15 March – Stuart Nash resigned as Minister of Police following revelations he asked the Police Commissioner Andrew Coster to appeal a decision he felt was too light, a breach of the expectation that the Government remains neutral in regards to operational Police matters.
- 16 March
  - New Zealand enacts a ban of TikTok on devices connected to parliament citing cybersecurity concerns.
  - Early childhood, primary, and secondary school teachers affiliated with the New Zealand Educational Institute (NZEI) and Post Primary Teachers' Association (PPTA) hold a nationwide strike following the breakdown of negotiations with the Government over salaries and work conditions.
- 17 March – Nash subsequently admitted to a third incident of misconduct where he contacted the Ministry of Business, Innovation and Employment (MBIE) to advocate for a migrant health professional in Napier in September 2022.
- 25 March
  - A rally organised by Posie Parker in central Auckland ends in chaos after counter-protesters, estimated to number in the thousands, make too much noise for her to speak. Parker later left by police escort.
  - Marama Davidson, Green Party co-leader is hit by a motorcyclist and injured. On the same day, she made controversial comments about white cisgender men committing violence.
  - Kea are spotted in Christchurch's Port Hills for the first time in many years.
- 28 March – A forth incident involving Nash reveals that in 2020, he emailed two of his donors, who were commercial property owners, about a commercial rent relief policy Cabinet was discussing. Nash is stripped of all his remaining ministerial portfolios.
- 29 March
  - Prime Minister Chris Hipkins announces a review into Stuart Nash's communications with his two donors.
  - Secondary school teachers stage a second national strike following the breakdown of negotiations with the Government.
- 30 March – New Zealand records its first case of rabies in a human. A patient who had been in hospital since early March died from the disease, which did not spread further.

=== April ===
- 10 April – A tornado sweeps through the Tasman Region damaging fifty properties. It tears the roofs off at least twelve houses, brings down trees and powerlines and leaves one person trapped in their car.
- 11 April – Prime Minister Hipkins and Minister of Health Ayesha Verrall confirm that the New Zealand Government would retain some COVID-19 restrictions such as the seven-day mandatory isolation period for positive cases and mask wearing requirements at health facilities.
- The New Zealand Government overhauls its Three Waters water infrastructure reform programme, renaming it the Water Services Reform Programme.
- 29 April – The Dominion Post is revamped as The Post. On 27 April 2023, Stuff confirmed that The Dominion Post would adopt its new name The Post on 29 April. Stuff also announced that it would launch a new subscription-based website for The Post that would co-exist with the free Stuff news website.

=== May ===
- 3 May – Meka Whaitiri resigns from the Labour Party and loses her ministerial portfolios, but remains in Parliament as an independent MP sitting with Te Pāti Māori.
- 4 May – Secondary school teachers affiliated with the Post Primary Teachers' Association (PPTA) launch a series of nationwide rolling strikes throughout the month of May in response to a pay dispute with the Ministry of Education.
- 5 May
  - Heavy rain hits the lower North Island and the upper South Island bringing surface flooding and landslips. Evacuations take place in Tasman District after a river bursts its banks and several other regions issue weather warnings.
  - Elizabeth Kerekere resigns from the Green Party, but remains in Parliament as an independent MP.
- 6 May – The coronation of Charles III takes place in London.
- 12 May – Early childhood education teachers affiliated with the New Zealand Educational Institute (NZEI) accept a pay offer from the Ministry of Education, which also increases sick leave by 15 days. Their primary school colleagues have voted to hold out on the Ministry's pay offer.
- 16 May – A fire in Loafers Lodge in Wellington kills five residents.
- 18 May – The 2023 budget is delivered.
- 22 May – The two main teachers' unions, the PPTA and NZEI, suspended strike action in response to progress in pay and work negotiations with the Education Ministry and Education Minister Jan Tinetti.
- 26 May – From that date bank transactions were processed every day, and weekend transactions (e.g. on Saturday and Sunday) would no longer held until the next "working day" i.e.. Monday.
- 26 May – Several school climate strike protests are held across New Zealand.

=== June ===
- 5 June – The 2023 King's Birthday and Coronation Honours are announced.
- 7 June – Primary school teachers affiliated with the New Zealand Educational Institute (NZEI) voted to accept the Education Ministry's collective agreement offer, which increases salaries and work leaves.
- 9 June – Secondary school teachers affiliated with the Post Primary Teachers' Association (PPTA) voted to reject the Education Ministry's collective agreement offer and to resume rolling strikes throughout the month.
- 14 June – Schools and public transportation in Ōpōtiki are suspended due to disruption caused by a tangihanga (funeral) for slain Mongrel Mob Barbarians president Steven Taiatini.
- 16 June – North Auckland's Pūhoi to Warkworth motorway is officially opened by Prime Minister Chris Hipkins and other officials. The motorway opened to traffic on 19 June 2023.
- 21 June – The PPTA suspends strikes action after agreeing to an arbitration process to resolve its pay dispute with the Education Ministry.
- 22 June
  - John Adams is appointed as the third bishop of Palmerston North by Pope Francis. He is consecrated on 30 September by numerous senior Catholic clergy.
  - A state of emergency is declared in Tairāwhiti due to severe weather.
- 29 June – Primary school principals affiliated with the NZEI vote to accept the Education Ministry's pay offer consisting of progressive pay rises over the next two years.

=== July ===
- 1 July
  - Plastic ban for fresh produce. New Zealand bans thin plastic bags for fresh produce from supermarkets, becoming the first country to do so. The ban will also extend to plastic straws and cutlery.
  - The fuel tax subsidy introduced in March 2022 is removed.
- 9 July – Chris Hipkins signs a free trade agreement with the European Union in Brussels.
- 11 July
  - Waka Kotahi announces a temporary ban on Te Huia entering Auckland after twice running through red signals.
  - The University of Otago announces a $1.3 million rebrand, including a new te reo Māori name and tohu (symbol).
  - Three years after the 2019 Whakaari/White Island eruption, the trial over failings of health and safety begin. The legal proceedings are the result of WorkSafe's most extensive and complex investigation to date
- 13 July – Police announce that there have been 388 ram raid style events resulting in 218 prosecutions in the six months ended May.
- 16 July
  - Two children are found safe after going missing for one night at Mavora Lakes.
  - The United Kingdom officially joins the CPTPP in Auckland.
- 17 July – Lauren Dickason goes to trial for causing the deaths of her three daughters in 2021.
- 20 July – A shooting in Central Auckland leaves three people dead.
- 31 July – An arbitration panel recommends that secondary school teachers receive a 14.5% pay rise in an effort to end a pay dispute between the Ministry of Education and the Post Primary Teachers Association.

=== August ===
- 3 August – The Hawke's Bay Regional Council, Napier City Council, Hastings District Council, Wairoa District Council and Central Hawke's Bay District accept the Government's NZ$556 Cyclone Gabrielle recovery cost-sharing agreement.
- 4 August – Results for the 2023 Invercargill City Council by-election are released.
- 7 August – Nurses affiliated with the New Zealand Nurses Organisation vote to accept a collective pay offer agreement with Te Whatu Ora (Health New Zealand).
- 9 August
  - Secondary school teachers affiliated with the Post Primary Teachers' Association (PPTA) vote to accept a 14.5% pay rise agreement with the Ministry of Education.
  - 900 unionised Westpac bank workers affiliated with First Union New Zealand stage a two-hour strike seeking a wage increase.
- 15 August – COVID-19 in New Zealand: The last remaining COVID-19 public health requirements—namely the seven-day mandatory isolation period for positive cases, and the wearing of face masks in healthcare settings—are removed at 12:01 am.
- 16 August – Lauren Dickason is found guilty for murdering her three daughters in 2021.
- 21 August – Area school teachers accepted a 14.5% pay rise in a pay agreement negotiated by both the PPTA and NZEI.

=== September ===
- 5 September – Senior doctors and dentists affiliated Association of Salaried Medical Specialists (ASMS) launched a two-hour strike, rejecting a pay offer from Te Whatu Ora.
- 8 September – The 53rd New Zealand Parliament is formally dissolved ahead of the 2023 general election.
- 13 September
  - Senior doctors and dentists affiliated with ASMS continue with a second round of strikes in response to a pay dispute with Te Whatu Ora.
  - Corrections officers affiliated with the Corrections Association and Public Service Association (PSA) reject an offer by the Department of Corrections to settle the Prisons' Collective Agreement.
- 17 September – Strong wind causes weather warnings and watches are issued throughout country, over 10,000 people lose power. A gust of wind measuring 246 km/h is measured in Cape Turnagain, near the highest ever wind reading in New Zealand at 250 km/h. Over 60 flights are cancelled by Air New Zealand.
- 18 September – The Queenstown Lakes District Council issues a "boil water" notice for Queenstown and Frankton following an outbreak of cryptosporidium.
- 19 September – A Westpac helicopter crashes near Mount Pirongia while heading towards a patient.
- 20 September
  - A 6.0M (initially measured at 6.2M) hits 45 km north of Geraldine at a depth of 10 km.
  - Properties are evacuated as a large scrub fire burns in Pukaki Downs, near Twizel.
- 21 September – A state of emergency is declared in the Gore District, following heavy rain and flooding. It is later updated to cover the entire Southland region.
- 26 September – Multiple ferry sailings in the Cook Strait are cancelled due to high winds.

=== October ===
- 1 October – Driving test resit fees are removed by Waka Kotahi.
- 5 October
  - The Government announces six new marine reserves in the southeast of the South Island.
  - A dairy owner was seriously wounded during a robbery attempt at a New Windsor dairy in Auckland. A 24-year-old man was arrested and subsequently charged in relation to the incident.
- 6 October – Queenstown Airport was evacuated following a security scare involving items that were subsequently deemed non-threatening by a New Zealand Defence Force ordnance unit. Air New Zealand subsequently cancelled 10 flights.
- 10 October – Allied Press journalists and print distribution staff affiliated with the E tū union stage a 24-hour strike seeking better wages.
- 14 October
  - An emergency alert is issued to residents of Christchurch and Banks Peninsula due to strong winds reaching 140 km/h.
  - The 2023 New Zealand general election takes place, leading to National's Christopher Luxon becoming Prime Minister-designate.
- 21 October – A gyrocopter crashes at the Omaka Aerodrome, killing its only occupant.
- 22 October – A new ferry service is announced for Waiheke Island.
- 24 October – Christchurch mosque shootings: The deputy chief coroner of New Zealand opens an inquest into the shootings to investigate police response times.
- 25 October – Richard Laurenson is appointed as the fourth bishop of Hamilton by Pope Francis. His consecration then took place on 8 December by numerous senior Catholic clergy. His appointment means that all six Catholic Dioceses in New Zealand have a bishop, the first time since 2019.
- 29 October – Almost 2,000 Northland homes lose power due to ex-Cyclone Lola. Lanes close on the Auckland Harbour Bridge.
- 30 October
  - United Airlines starts a new route between Auckland and Los Angeles.
  - Online supermarket Supie goes into voluntary administration, leaving 120 employees unemployed.
- 31 October – Judge Evangelos Thomas convicts Whakaari Management Limited of one health and safety charge relating to the 2019 Whakaari / White Island eruption.

=== November ===
- 3 November – The Electoral Commission concludes vote counting, which shows that the leading National Party requires support from both ACT and New Zealand First parties to form a government after the final tally reveals a shift in parliamentary seats.
- 4 November – Miramar Peninsula is declared pest free.
- 8 November – Over 100 early childhood education centres strike for the first time.
- 10 November – China Southern Airlines starts its seasonal route between Christchurch and Guangzhou.
- 13 November – Interislander ferry Kaiārahi has a hole ripped out of its hull as it comes into berth. It will be out of service for about a week.
- 21 November – The water treatment plant of Te Aroha temporarily shuts down due to bad weather.
- 23 November
  - Prime Minister-designate Christopher Luxon announces coalition arrangements and deals have finished with ACT and New Zealand First.
  - 16 institutions nationwide including St Kentigern College, Wellington Hospital, Bowen Hospital, Auckland City Hospital and Manukau Superclinic receive email bomb threats, prompting lockdowns and police searches.
  - Pro-Palestinian protesters blockade the entry to the Ports of Auckland in response to the Gaza war. Police arrested at least six protesters.
- 24 November
  - A formal signing ceremony and announcement of ministerial roles for the Sixth National Government takes place.
  - Several North Auckland schools including Orewa College receive email bomb threats, which are linked to the threats yesterday.
- 25 November – The Port Waikato by-election takes place.
- 27 November – The Sixth National Government is sworn in by the Governor-General, Dame Cindy Kiro at Government House.
- 29 November
  - The official cash rate is kept at 5.5%.
  - Prime Minister Luxon unveils his "100-day plan", with 49 policy changes.

=== December ===
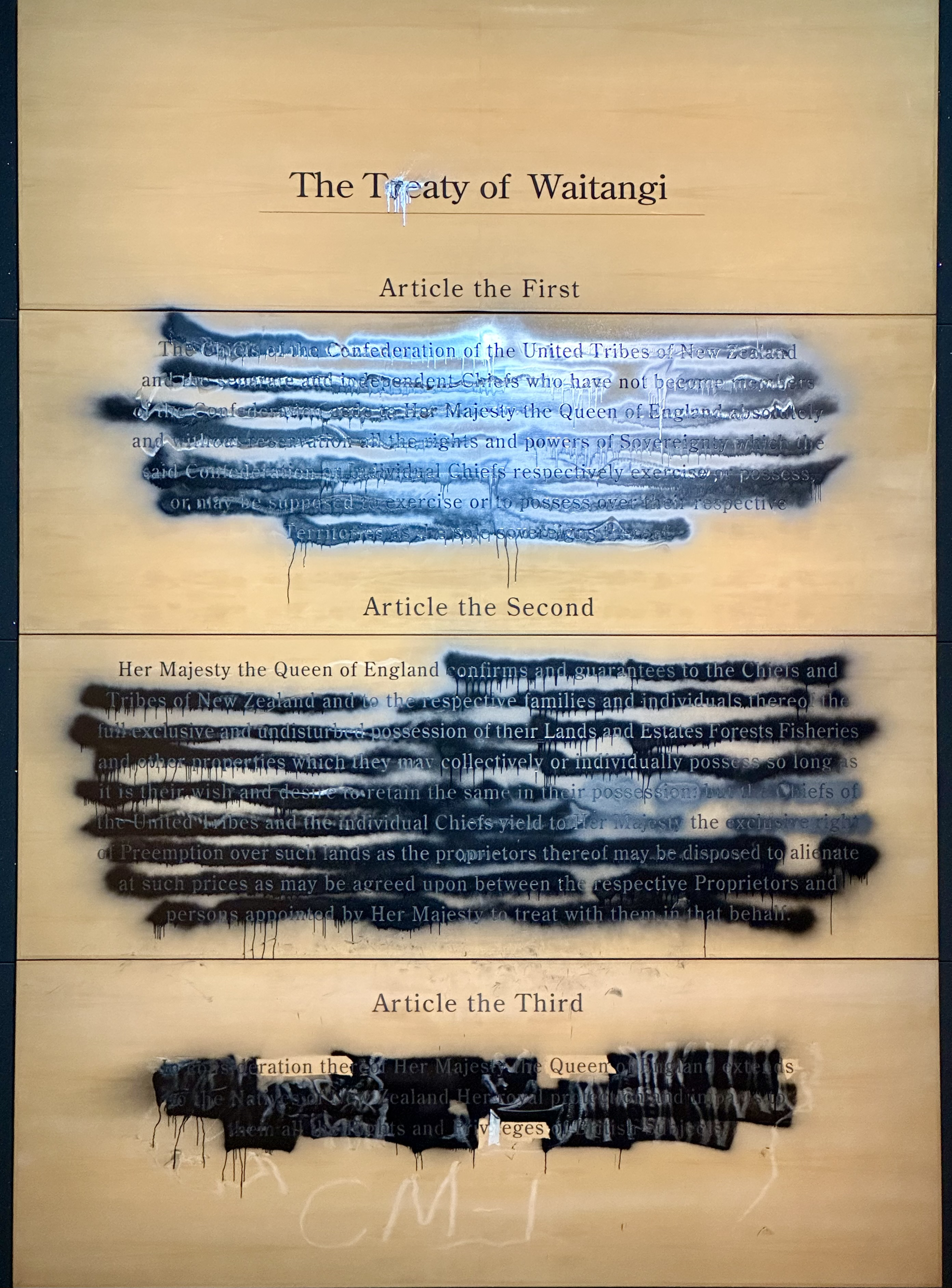
The defaced Treaty of Waitangi sign at Te Papa

- 1 December – The Government begins a reserve against proposed amendments to World Health Organisation health regulations to consider these against a 'National Interest Test'.
- 3 December – New Zealand signs the "COP28 UAE declaration on sustainable agriculture, resilient food systems and climate action".
- 5 December
  - Te Pāti Māori (Māori Party) organises a series of nationwide protests known as the National Māori Action Day to protest against the Sixth National Government's policies on co-governance and the Treaty of Waitangi. The protests coincided with the first meeting of the 54th New Zealand Parliament.
  - The 54th New Zealand Parliament begins, following the Commission Opening of Parliament where MPs were sworn in and Gerry Brownlee was elected as Speaker of the House.
  - Hundreds of Palestinian solidarity protesters gather at the New Zealand Parliament calling for a ceasefire in the Gaza war.
- 6 December – The State Opening of Parliament takes place.
- 8 December – Queenstown lifts its water boil notice after two months.
- 10 December – United Airlines starts its seasonal route between Christchurch and San Francisco. It marks the first time an American airline has flown non-stop between the South Island and the United States.
- 11 December
  - A protest is held at Te Papa. The English translation on a wooden display of the Te Tiriti o Waitangi at Te Papa is defaced with spray paint.
  - Bishop Michael Gielen reconsiders the future for a catholic cathedral for the Catholic Diocese of Christchurch, following the 2010 Canterbury earthquake.
- 12 December – Severe hailstorms, lightning, thunderstorms and a tornado hit the Canterbury Plains and Wellington regions, leading to flooding and power outages for thousands of customers.
- 15 December
  - The Criminal Cases Review Commission sends Mikaere Oketopa's case back to the Court of Appeal of New Zealand for it to be reconsidered over "strong concerns with the police investigation, and his convictions". Oketopa has a conviction for the 1994 rape and murder of Anne-Maree Ellens in Christchurch.
  - Winston Peters has an engagement with Fiji's Prime Minister Sitiveni Rabuka, who each exchange gifts. This marks Peters' first overseas engagement as foreign minister.
  - Judith Collins is appointed as King's Counsel.
- 16 December – Cathay Pacific starts its seasonal route between Christchurch and Hong Kong.
- 17 December – Let's Get Wellington Moving, a plan to improve Wellington's public transport, is cancelled by the new government.
- 20 December
  - The government announces new rules for primary and intermediate schools. Starting in Term 1 2024, students will be taught one hour of reading, writing and maths for each subject per day. Starting in Term 2, cellphones will be banned during school for the students.
  - Finance Minister Nicola Willis releases the 2023 mini-budget.
- 30 December – The 2024 New Year Honours are announced.
- 31 December – The Clean Car Discount scheme ends.

== Holidays and observances ==
Public holidays in New Zealand in 2023 are as follows:

- 1 January – New Year's Day
- 2 January – Day after New Year's Day
- 3 January – New Year's Day observed
- 6 February – Waitangi Day
- 7 April – Good Friday
- 10 April – Easter Monday
- 25 April – Anzac Day
- 5 June – King's Birthday
- 14 July – Matariki
- 23 October – Labour Day
- 25 December – Christmas Day
- 26 December – Boxing Day

== Arts and entertainment ==
- List of 2023 box office number-one films in New Zealand

== Sport ==
=== Association football ===
- 20 July – 20 August: The 2023 FIFA Women's World Cup is co-hosted by Australia and New Zealand and becomes the highest attended women's world cup to date.

=== Horse racing ===
==== Harness racing ====
- Auckland Cup – Akuta
- New Zealand Cup – Swayzee
- Rowe Cup – Love N The Port

==== Thoroughbred racing ====
- Auckland Cup – Platinum Invador
- New Zealand Cup – Mahrajaan
- Wellington Cup – Leaderboard

=== Mountain biking ===
- 4 August – At the 2023 UCI Mountain Bike World Championships, New Zealand takes a clean sweep in the junior women's downhill, with Erice van Leuven taking the world championship ahead of fellow Kiwis Poppy Lane and Sacha Earnest.

=== Motorsports ===
- 2 July – Shane van Gisbergen wins his first ever NASCAR Cup Series race start at the Grant Park 220.
- 27 August – Liam Lawson finished his first ever Formula One race in 13th at the Dutch Grand Prix, deputizing for the injured Daniel Ricciardo. Lawson was the first New Zealander to compete in Formula One since Brendon Hartley in 2018.
- 17 September – Lawson scores his first Formula One points, finishing 9th at the Singapore Grand Prix.
- 8 October – 16 year old Christchurch born Louis Sharp won the British F4 Championship with 6 wins on the season beating out William Macintyre. Sharp marks the first time a New Zealander has won the British F4 Championship.
- 8 October – Van Gisbergen and kiwi teammate Richie Stanaway win the 66th running of the Bathurst 1000.

=== Rowing ===
- New Zealand Secondary School Championships (Maadi Cup)
  - Maadi Cup (boys' U18 coxed eight) – St Bede's College
  - Levin Jubilee Cup (girls' U18 coxed eight) – Rangi Ruru Girls' School
  - Star Trophy (overall points) – Rangi Ruru Girls' School

=== Sailing ===
- 15 January – The New Zealand SailGP team win the Singapore SailGP event, giving them their third event win of the 2022–2023 season

=== Shooting ===
- Ballinger Belt – John Snowden (Ashburton)

=== Tennis ===
- 2–14 January – The WTA Auckland Open and ATP Auckland Open (collectively known as the ASB Classic) are held for the first time since 2020, after two years of cancellations related to the COVID-19 pandemic.

== Deaths ==
=== January ===
- 2 January
  - Frank Cameron, cricket player (Otago, national team) and national cricket selector (born 1932).
  - Peter Kelly motorcycle speedway rider (Newcastle Diamonds, Berwick Bandits, England national team) (born 1935).
- 3 January – Jeremy Salmond, heritage architect (Auckland Synagogue, Pompallier House), NZIA Gold Medal (2018) (born 1944).
- 6 January
  - Sir Patrick Hogan, Hall of Fame racehorse breeder, founder of Cambridge Stud (born 1939).
  - Stuart McCutcheon, university administrator, vice-chancellor of the University of Auckland (2005–2020) and Victoria University of Wellington (2000–2004) (born 1954).
- 10 January – Bruce Murray, cricketer (Wellington, national team), cricket administrator, historian, and schoolteacher, principal of Naenae College (1981–1989) and Tawa College (1989–2002) (born 1940).
- 11 January – Jim Howland, local politician, mayor of Putāruru (1974–1989), Waikato District Councillor (1989–2007) (born 1929).
- 13 January – Bob Stott, railway industry commentator and writer, editor and owner of Rails magazine (born 1940).
- 15 January – Ewing Stevens, Presbyterian minister, writer, newspaper editor and radio talkback host (Radio Pacific, Radio Live) (born 1926).
- 16 January – Geoff Harrow, mountaineer and environmentalist, first ascent of Baruntse (1954), rediscovered Hutton's shearwater breeding colonies (1964) (born 1926).
- 17 January – Larry Morris, Hall of Fame singer (Larry's Rebels) (born 1947).
- 20 January
  - Chris Leitch, politician, leader of the Social Credit Party (since 2018) (born c. 1954).
  - Rodney Macann, operatic bass-baritone and Baptist minister (born 1942).
- 22 January – Bob Jackson, Hall of Fame croquet player, world doubles champion (1989) and world singles bronze medallist (1993), and table tennis player (born 1931).
- 25 January – Titewhai Harawira, Māori activist (Ngāti Hau, Ngāti Wai, Ngāti Hine) (born 1932).
- 26 January
  - Matthew During, neuroscientist, number 72 of New Zealand's Top 100 History Makers (2005) (born 1956).
  - Keith Thomson, Olympic field hockey player (1968), and cricketer (Canterbury, national team) (born 1941).
- Bruce Tocker, para athlete, lawn bowler, and sports administrator, Commonwealth Paraplegic Games gold medallist (1974), Paralympics New Zealand chief executive officer (1987–1999), Paralympic team chef de mission (1996) (born 1951).
- 29 January – Ross Gillespie, Olympic field hockey player (1960, 1964) and coach (1972, 1976) (born 1935).
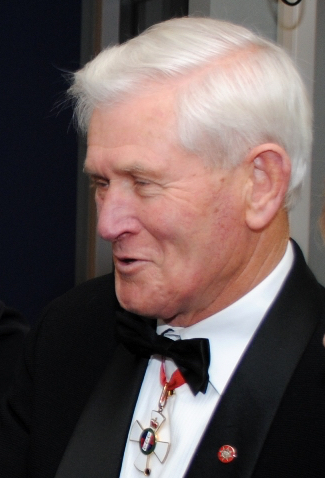
Sir Patrick Hogan

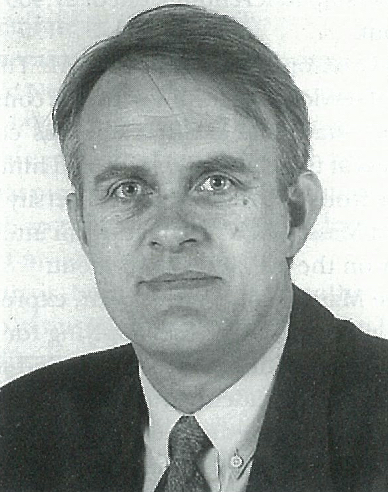
Stuart McCutcheon

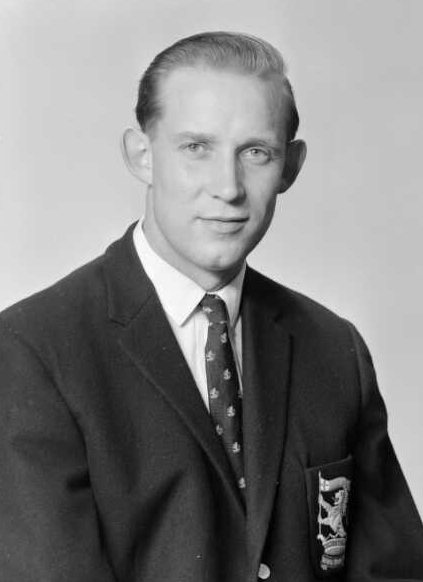
Bruce Murray

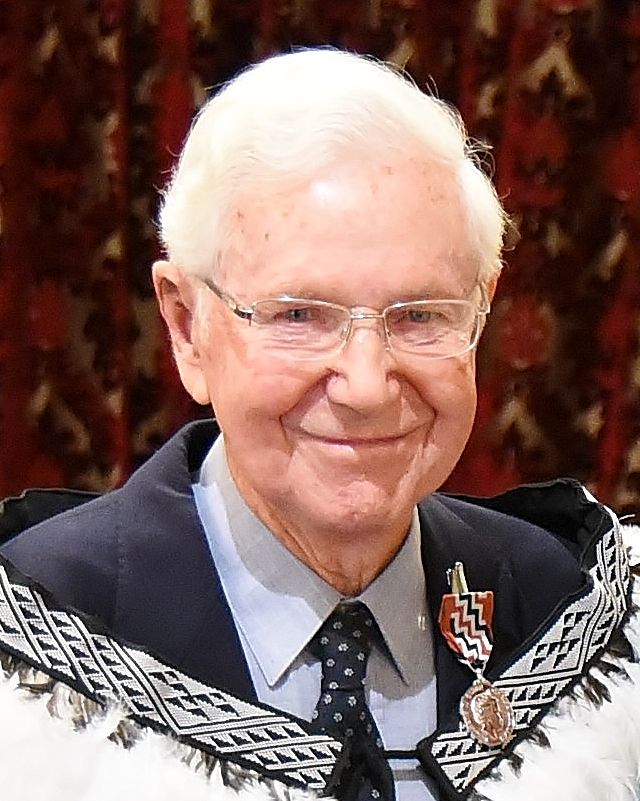
Geoff Harrow

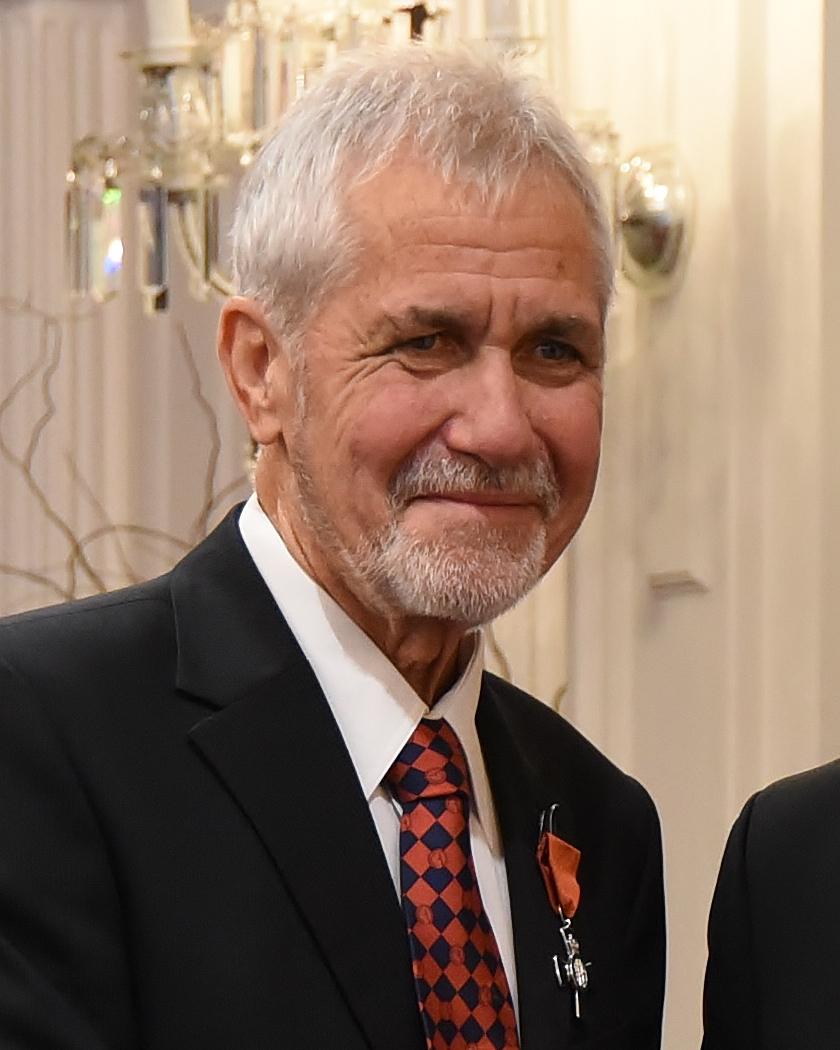
Rodney Macann

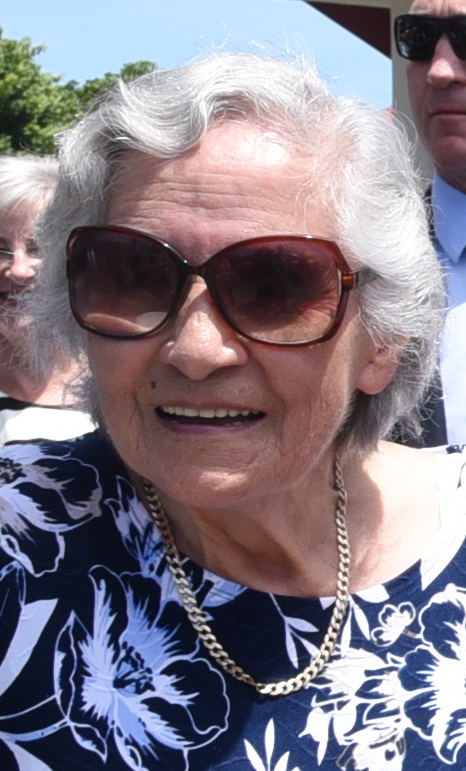
Titewhai Harawira

=== February ===
- 4 February – Rob Williams, army general, Chief of the General Staff (1981–1984) (born 1930).
- 5 February – Hilary Alexander, fashion journalist (The Daily Telegraph), British Fashion journalist of the year (1997, 2003) (born 1946).
- 7 February – John Harré, social anthropologist (born 1931).
- 8 February – George Preddey, atmospheric physicist (born 1941).
- 9 February – Bill Currey, rugby union player (Taranaki, national team) (born 1944).
- 10 February – Nancy Tichborne, watercolour artist and gardener (born 1942).
- 12 February – Dennis McGrath, teacher and academic administrator, principal of Auckland College of Education (1985–2001) (born 1940).
- 14 February – John Prince, Hall of Fame croquet player, first player to complete a sextuple peel in competition (born 1945).
- 18 February – Peter Wolfenden, Hall of Fame harness-racing driver and trainer (Cardigan Bay) (born 1935).
- 20 February – Jim Savage, shot putter, archer and table tennis player, Paralympic bronze medallist (1972, 1976) (born 1936).
- 23 February – Alice Wylie, local politician and community leader, Mount Albert borough and city councillor (1962–1989) and deputy mayor (1983–1989) (born 1924).
- 25 February – Wayne Burtt, cricketer (Canterbury, Central Districts) (born 1944).
- 26 February
  - Ian Hunter, artist, art curator (National Art Gallery), and cultural advocate (born 1946).
  - Ans Westra, photographer (Washday at the Pa), Arts Foundation of New Zealand Icon (since 2007) (born 1936).
- 27 February
  - Chester Borrows, police officer, politician and lawyer, MP for Whanganui (2005–2017), Minister for Courts (2011–2014), Deputy Speaker of the House of Representatives (2014–2017) (born 1957).
  - Paul East, lawyer, politician and diplomat, MP for Rotorua (1978–1996), National list MP (1996–1999), Attorney-General (1990–1997), Minister of Defence (1996–1997), High Commissioner to the United Kingdom (1999–2002), King's Counsel (since 1995), Privy Counsellor (since 1998) (born 1946).
- 28 February – Grant Turner, association footballer (Gisborne City, national team) (born 1958).
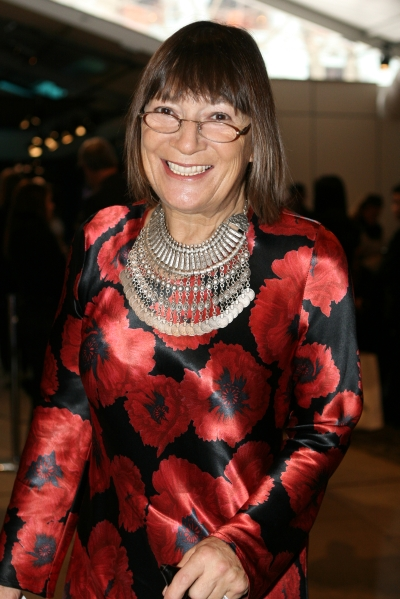
Hilary Alexander

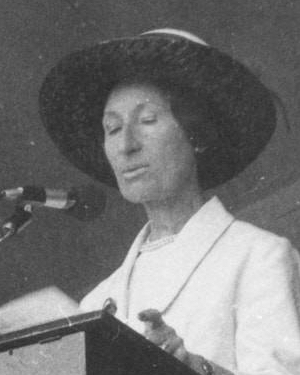
Alice Wylie

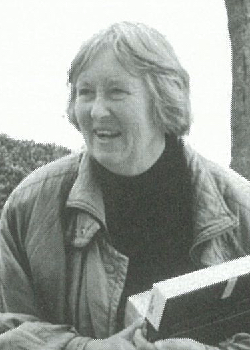
Ans Westra

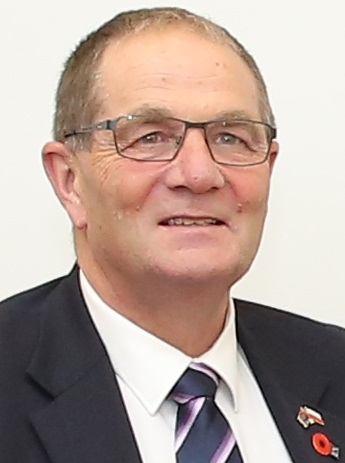
Chester Borrows

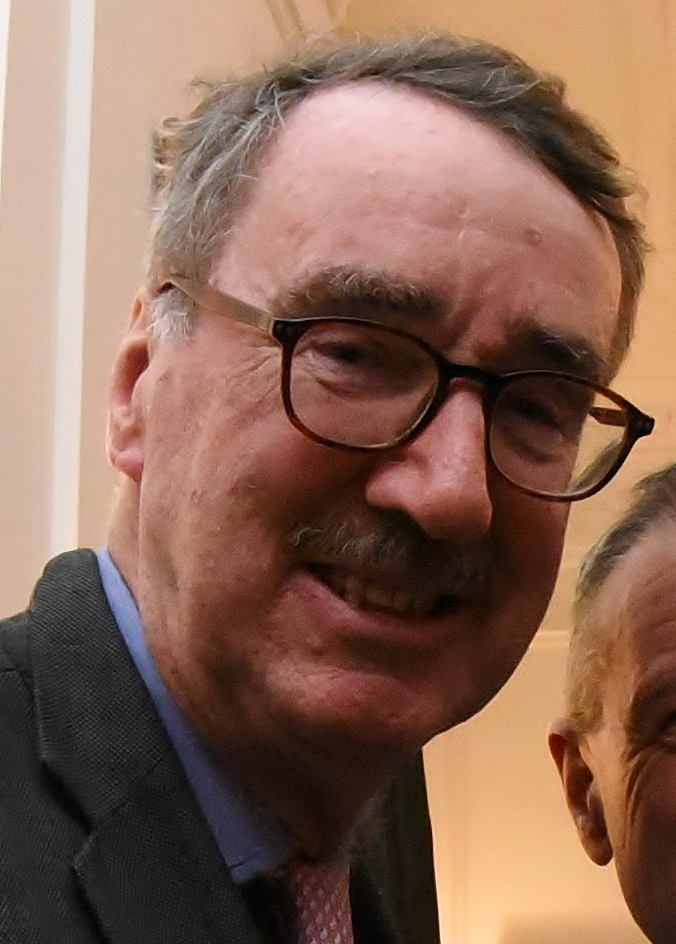
Paul East

=== March ===
- 2 March
  - Frank Dickson, banker, chief executive of the Canterbury Savings Bank (1963–1988) (born 1931).
  - Joan Williamson-Orr, local-body politician, Mayor of Taupō (1986–2001) (born 1930).
- 6 March – Georgina Beyer, politician, world's first openly transgender mayor and member of parliament, Mayor of Carterton (1995–2000), MP for Wairarapa (1999–2005), Labour list MP (2005–2007) (born 1957).
- 7 March – Grant Bridger, actor (Merry Christmas, Mr. Lawrence, Gloss), singer and radio presenter (born 1947).
- 13 March – John Wignall, bridge player and administrator (born 1932).
- 14 March – Russ Hoggard, athletics coach (Beverly Weigel, Dave Norris, Portia Bing) (born 1929).
- 16 March – Terence Broad, architect (National Library of New Zealand) (born 1945).
- 17 March
  - Peter Harwood, social scientist (Monash University, Auckland University of Technology), founder of New Zealand's first Citizens Advice Bureau (1970) (born 1939).
  - Mary Ronnie, librarian and writer, National Librarian (1976–1981) (born 1926).
- 19 March
  - Ralph Roberts, Olympic sailor (1960, 1968) and sports administrator, president of Yachting New Zealand (1986–1989), Olympic team chef de mission (1992) (born 1935).
  - Brian Strutt, association footballer (Sheffield Wednesday, Gisborne City), Chatham Cup (1987) (born 1959).
- 21 March – Arthur Joplin, World War II pilot (No. 617 Squadron RAF) (born 1923).
- 28 March – Judith Barker, medical anthropologist (University of California, San Francisco) (born 1947).
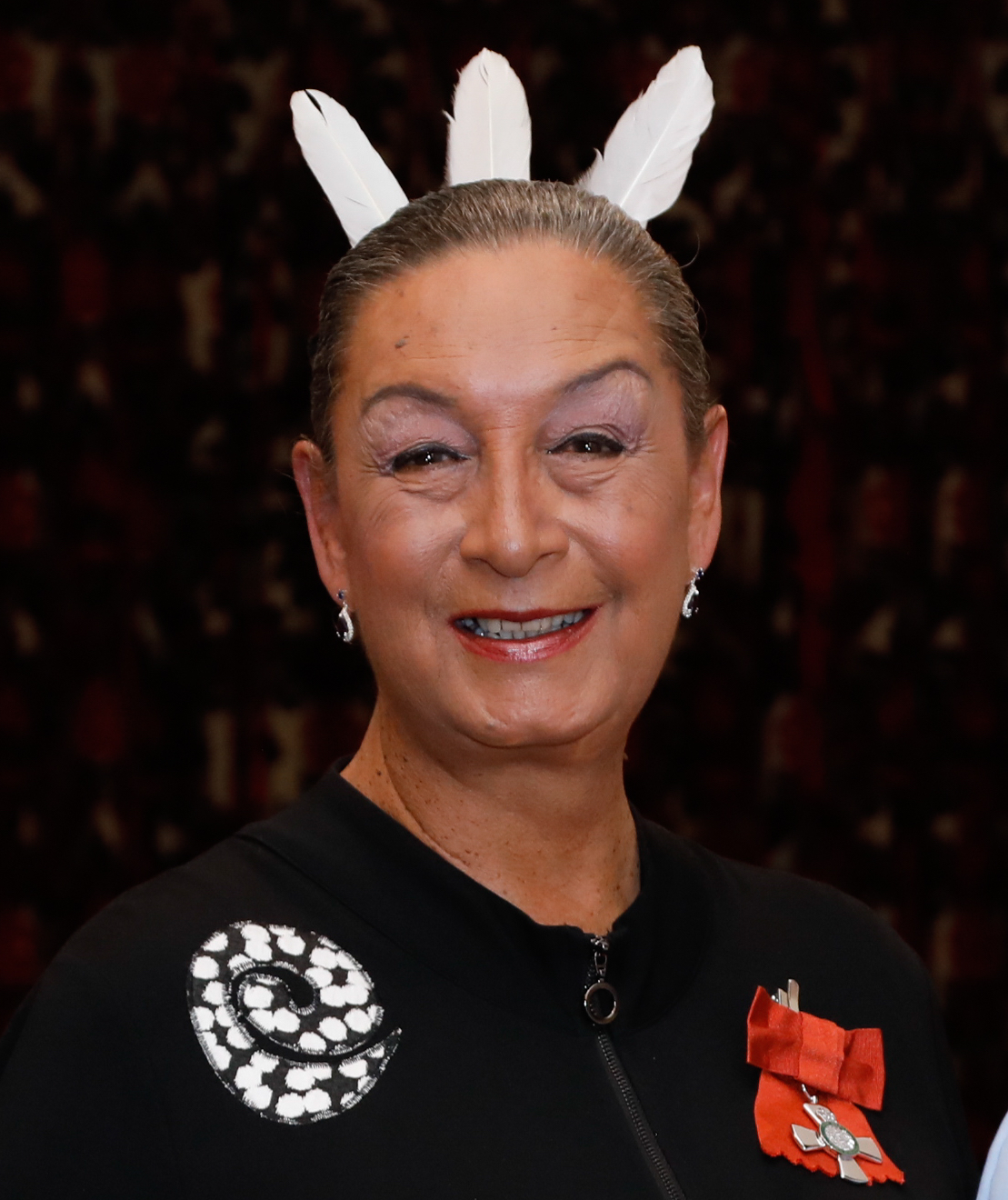
Georgina Beyer

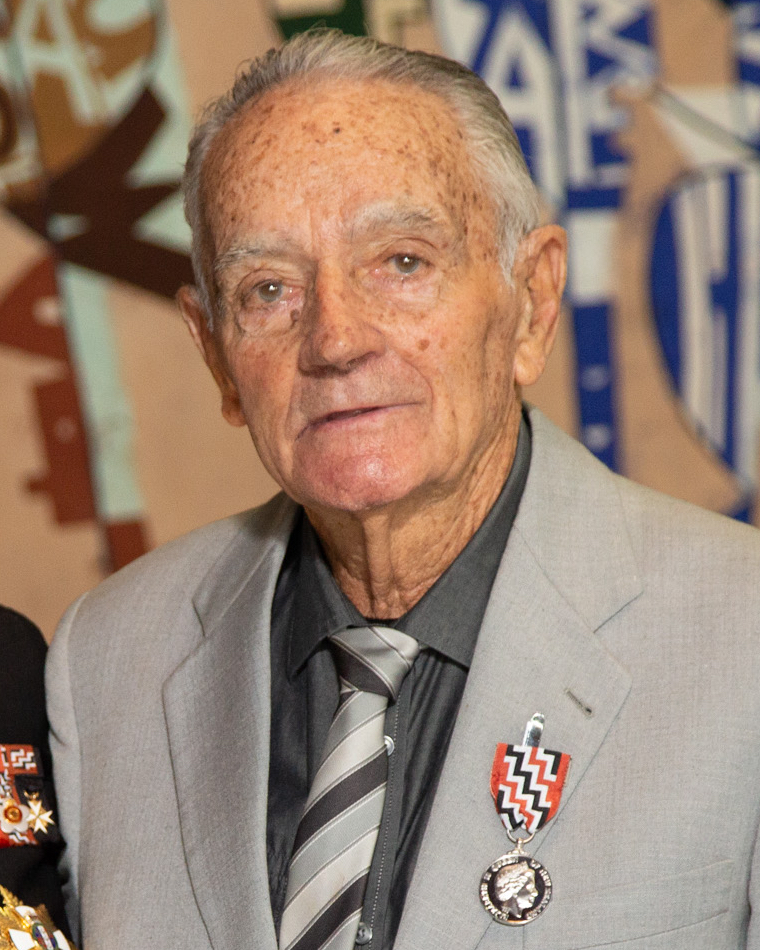
Russ Hoggard

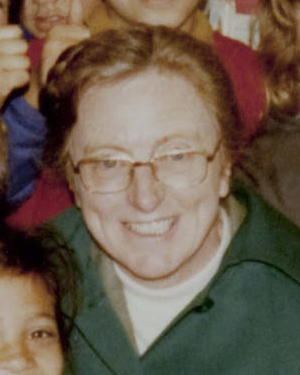
Mary Ronnie

=== April ===
- 2 April
  - Bushwhacker Butch, Hall of Fame professional wrestler (WWF, WWC, PNW) (born 1944).
  - Jim Ellis, geochemist (DSIR) and science administrator, DSIR director-general (1984–1990), Hector Medal (1987), Fellow of the Royal Society of New Zealand (since 1969) (born 1929).
- 5 April – Ross Murray, golfer, New Zealand Amateur champion (1972) (born 1933).
- 7 April — Susan Frykberg, electroacoustic composer and sound artist (born 1954).
- 8 April – Simon France, lawyer, academic (Victoria University of Wellington), and jurist, judge of the High Court (2005–2022) and Court of Appeal (2022–2023) (born 1958).
- 9 April – Ken McNatty, reproductive biologist (AgResearch, Victoria University of Wellington), Fellow of the Royal Society of New Zealand (since 1992), Pickering Medal (2009), Shorland Medal (2010) (born 1944).
- 13 April – Nanette Cameron, interior designer and design educator (born 1927).
- 20 April – Margaret Nielsen, pianist, piano teacher and academic (Victoria University of Wellington) (born 1933).
- 21 April – Jane Ritchie, psychologist (University of Waikato) (born 1936).
- 25 April – Alapati Lui Mataeliga, Samoan Roman Catholic prelate, archbishop of Samoa-Apia (since 2003) and superior of Tokelau (since 2015) (born 1953).
- 28 April – Taini Jamison, Hall of Fame netball coach (national team) and administrator (born 1928).
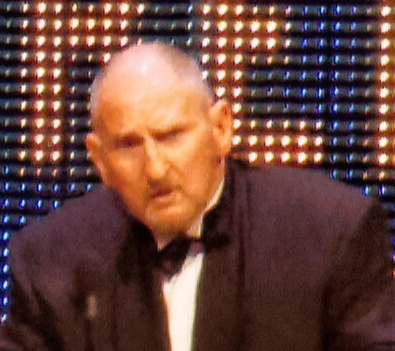
Bushwhacker Butch

=== May ===
- 1 May – John Dunmore, historian (Massey University), author, playwright, and publisher (born 1923).
- 5 May – Ian Witten, computer scientist (University of Waikato), co-creator of the Sequitur algorithm, Hector Medal (2005), Fellow of the Royal Society of New Zealand (since 1997) (born 1947).
- 6 May
  - Tony Cartwright, cricketer (Otago) (born 1940).
  - Roger Tait, rugby league player (Glenora Bears, Auckland, national team) (born 1938).
- 7 May – Lindsay Crocker, cricketer (Northern Districts) and cricket administrator, national team manager (2003–2009) (born 1958).
- 11 May
  - Beverley Holloway, entomologist (Department of Scientific and Industrial Research) (born 1931).
  - Sue Maroroa, chess player, Woman International Master (since 2014) (born 1991).
- 12 May – Bruce Robertson, rugby union player (Counties, national team) (born 1952).
- 14 May
  - Dame Rosie Horton, philanthropist (born 1940).
  - Murray Inglis, radio broadcaster (Radio Avon, 3ZM, Solid Gold FM), Billboard South Pacific radio personality of the year (1976) (born 1943).
- 15 May – Billy Guyton, rugby union player (Tasman Mako, Blues, Māori All Blacks) (born 1990).
- 16 May – Michael Eric Wahrlich (Mike the Juggler), busker (born 1955).
- 19 May – Kevin Ireland, poet, short-story writer, novelist and librettist, Prime Minister's Award for Literary Achievement (2004) (born 1933).
- 20 May – John Loveday, rugby union player (Manawatu, national team) (born 1949).
- 24 May – Peggy Liddell, radiotherapist, breast cancer screening pioneer (born 1920).
- 28 May – Princess Mele Siuʻilikutapu, Tongan royal and politician (born 1948).
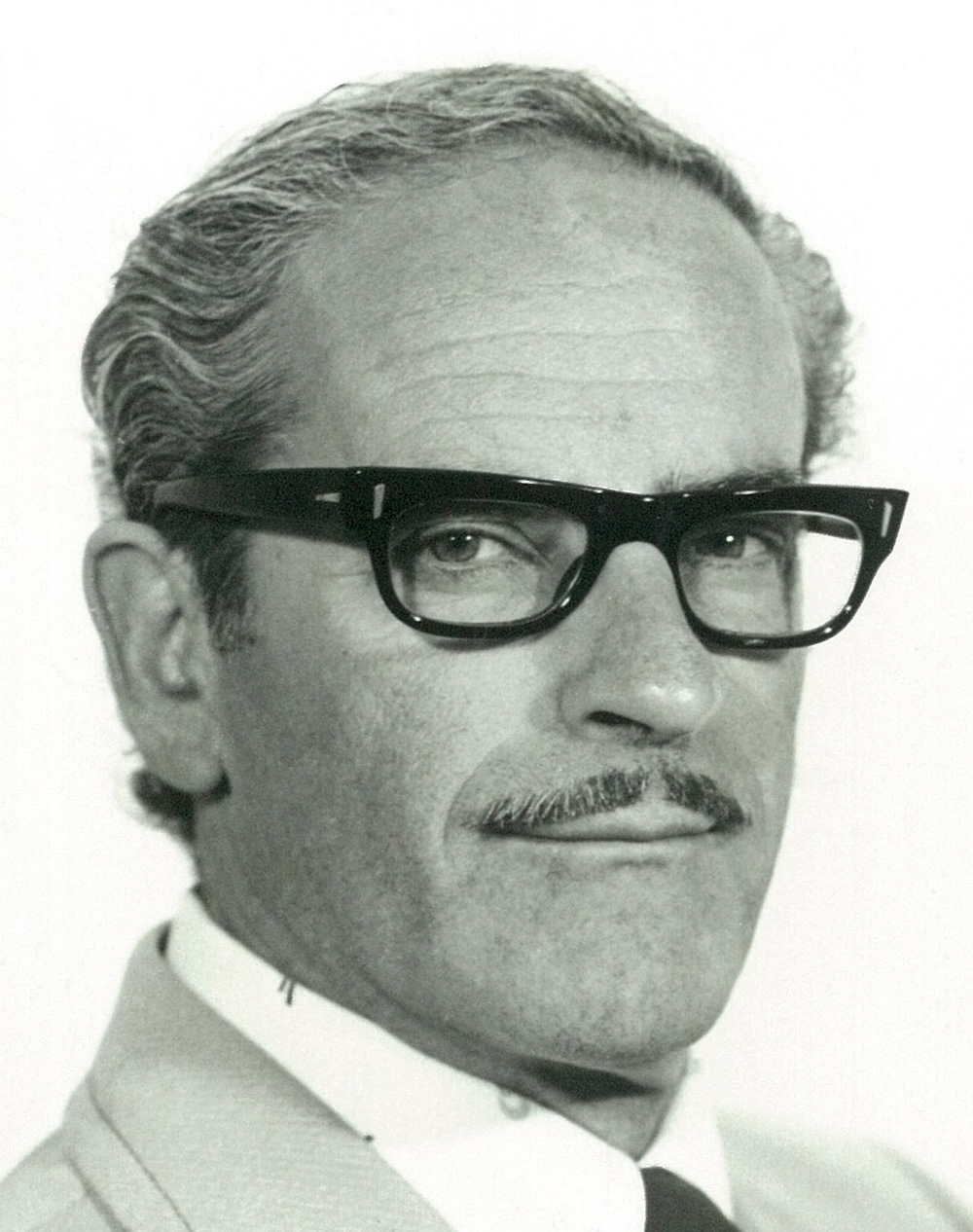
John Dunmore

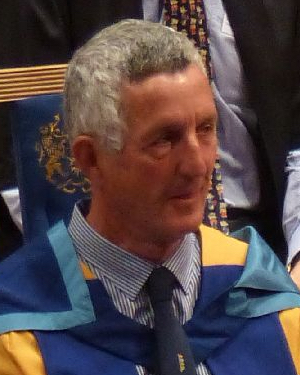
Ian Witten

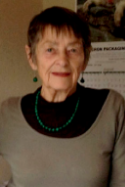
Beverley Holloway

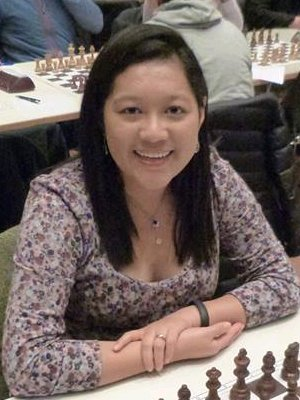
Sue Maroroa

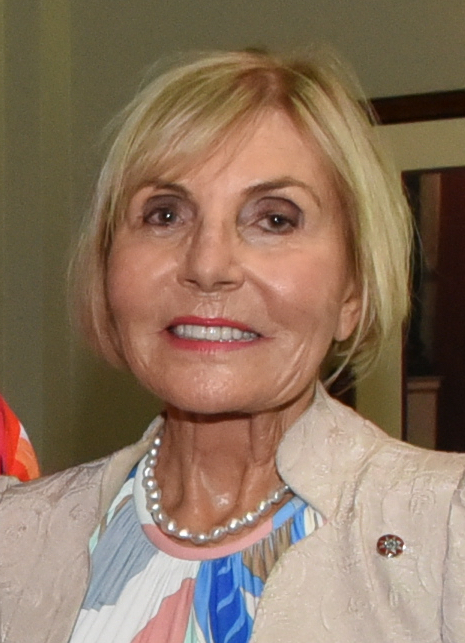
Dame Rosie Horton

Kevin Ireland

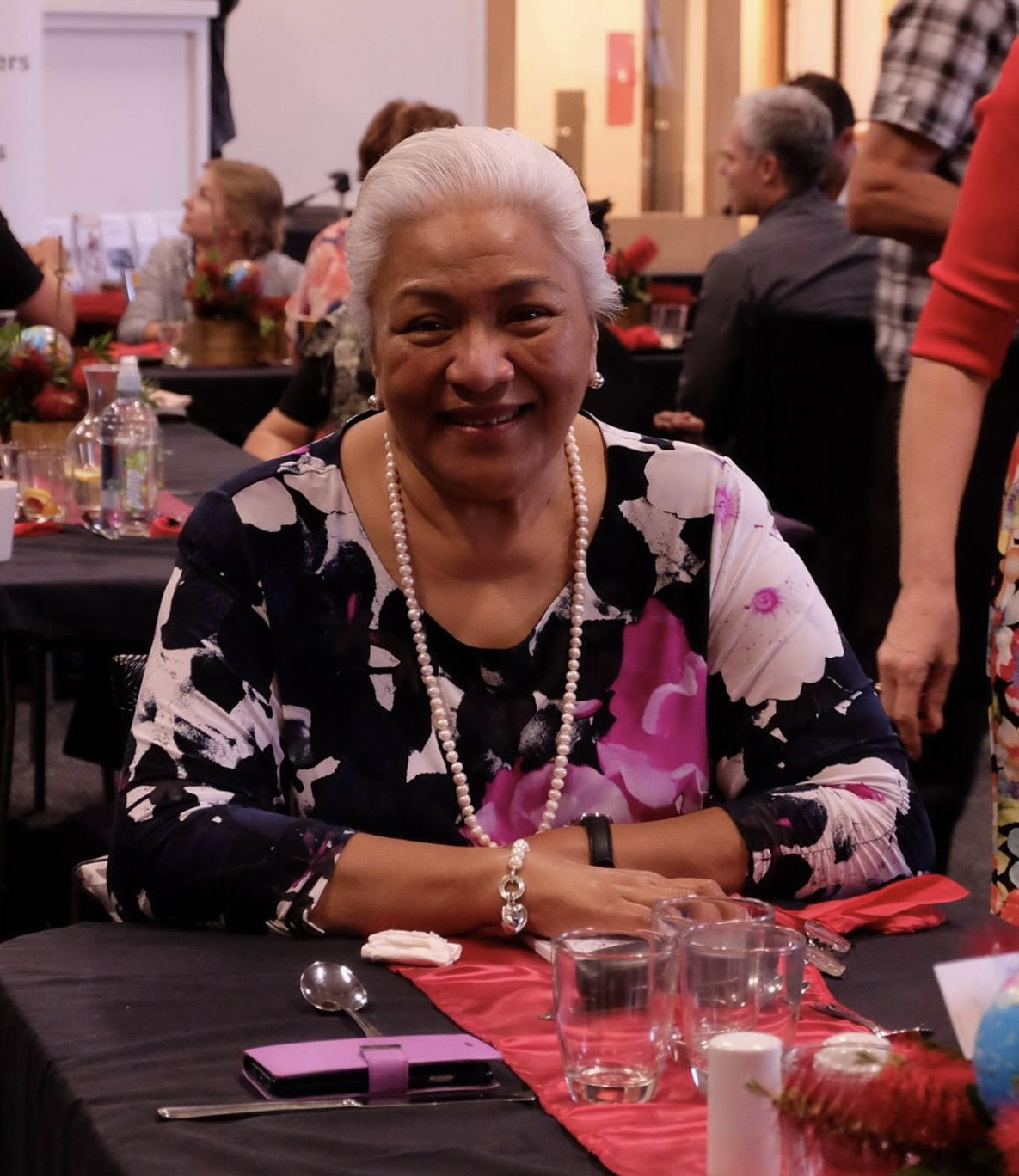
Mele Siuʻilikutapu

=== June ===
- 7 June – Ethna Rouse, cricketer (Canterbury, national team) (born 1937).
- 8 June – Charles Elworthy, economist and social scientist (born 1961).
- 9 June
  - Jim Allen, visual artist, Arts Foundation of New Zealand Icon (since 2015) (born 1922).
  - Roger Boon, rugby union player (Taranaki, national team) and coach (Wanganui) (born 1935).
- 11 June – Michael A. Noonan, television writer (Close to Home, The Governor, Homeward Bound), Feltex Award for writing (1975) (born 1940).
- 14 June – Rob Tucker, photographer and photojournalist (Taranaki Herald, The New Zealand Herald) (born 1948).
- 20 June – Peter Clapshaw, lawyer, president of the New Zealand Law Society (1985–1988) (born 1931).
- 21 June
  - Kerry Johnstone, shearer, four-time Golden Shears finalist (born c. 1941).
  - Bruce Martin, ceramicist (born 1925).
- 23 June – Keith Ovenden, political scientist (University of Canterbury), writer and social commentator (born 1943).
- 27 June – Anne Leahy, archaeologist (born 1925).
- 29 June – Dame Phyllis Guthardt, Methodist minister and women's leader, chancellor of the University of Canterbury (1998–2002) (born 1929).
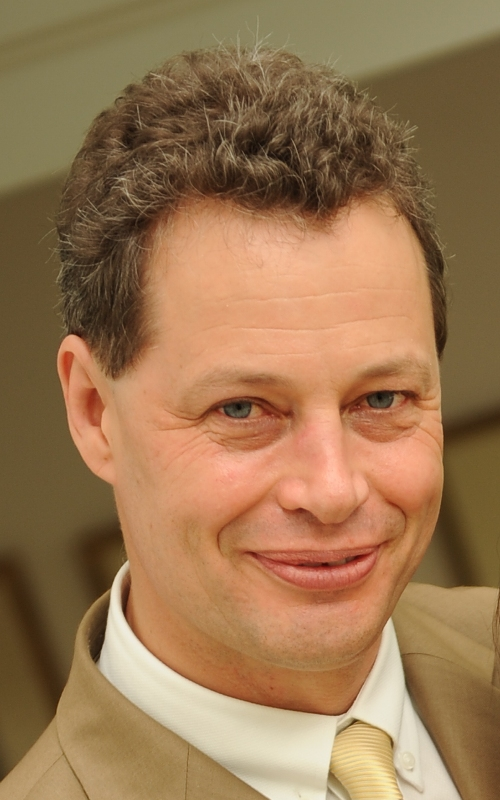
Charles Elworthy

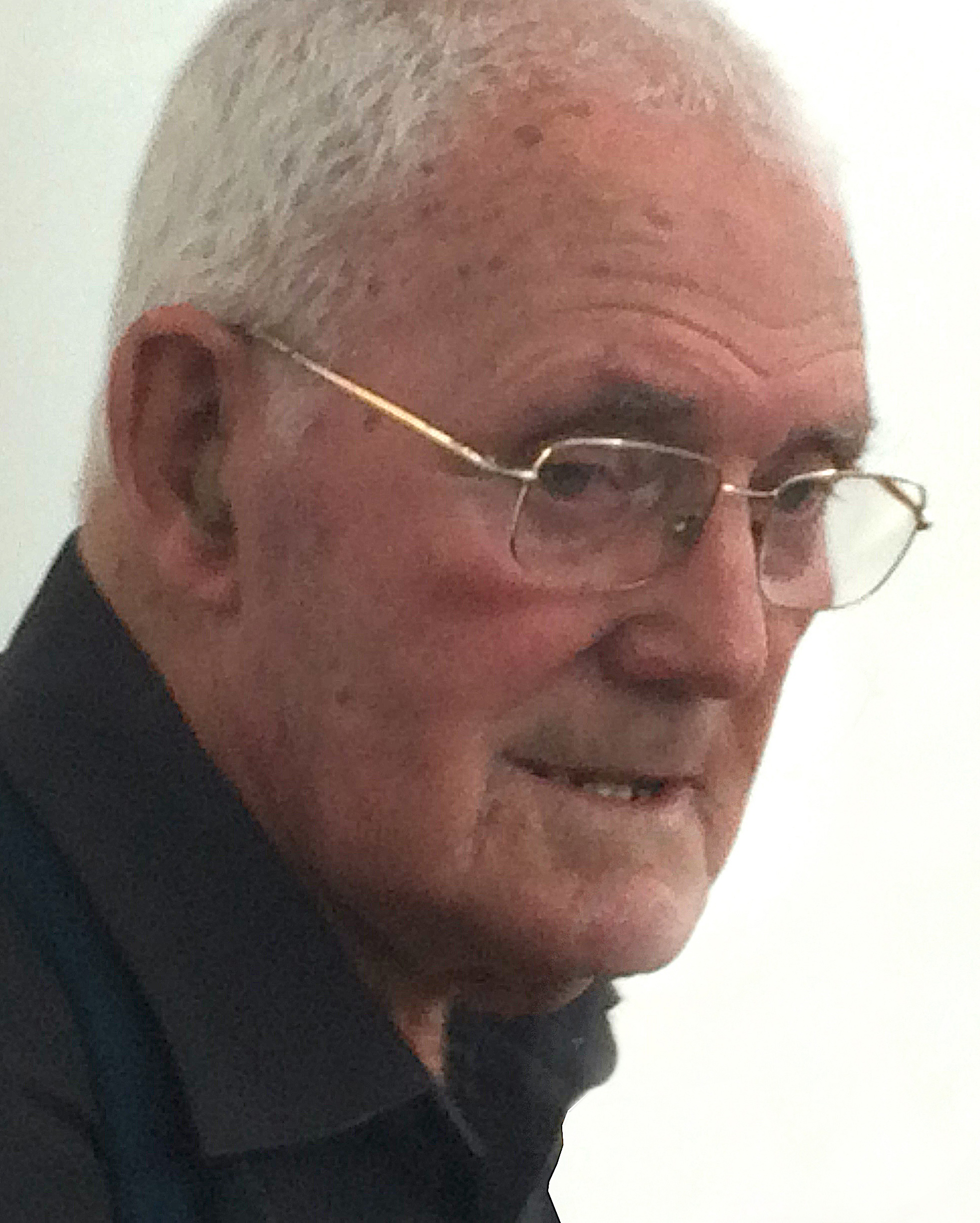
Jim Allen

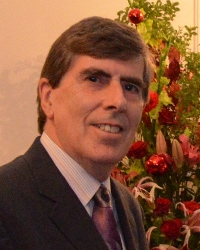
Keith Ovenden

=== July ===
- 1 July
  - Sir David Tompkins, lawyer and judge, King's Counsel (since 1974), High Court judge (1983–1997), chancellor of the University of Waikato (1981–1985) (born 1929).
  - Arnold Turner, lawyer, judge and local politician, deputy mayor of Mount Albert (1956–1962), District Court judge (1970–1986), principal planning judge (1984–1986) (born 1926).
- 3 July – Elsu, Standardbred racehorse, New Zealand Trotting Derby (2003), Auckland Pacing Cup (2003, 2004), Inter Dominion Pacing Championship (2005) (foaled 1999).
- 7 July – Kara Puketapu, rugby union player (New Zealand Māori), public servant and Māori leader (Te Āti Awa), Secretary of Maori Affairs (1977–1983) (born 1934).
- 10 July
  - Terry Procter, actor, the face of Mainland cheese (born 1939).
  - Gavin Royfee, cricketer (Canterbury) (born 1929).
- 13 July – John Kirkman, soil scientist (Massey University) (born 1938).
- 21 July – Jane Tehira, basketball player (national team), softball player (national team), and field hockey player (national team) (born 1928).
- 24 July – Pat Hunt, politician, MP for Pakuranga (1978–1984) (born 1931).
- 27 July – Fritz Eisenhofer, architect (born 1926).
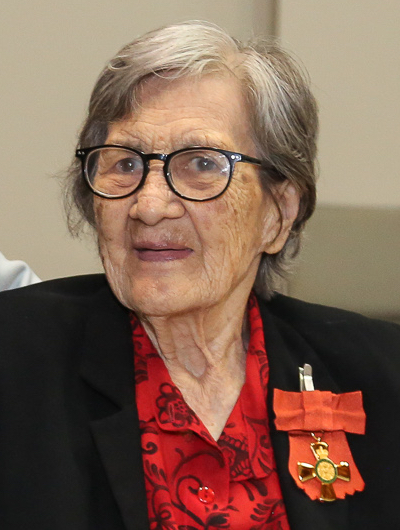
Jane Tehira

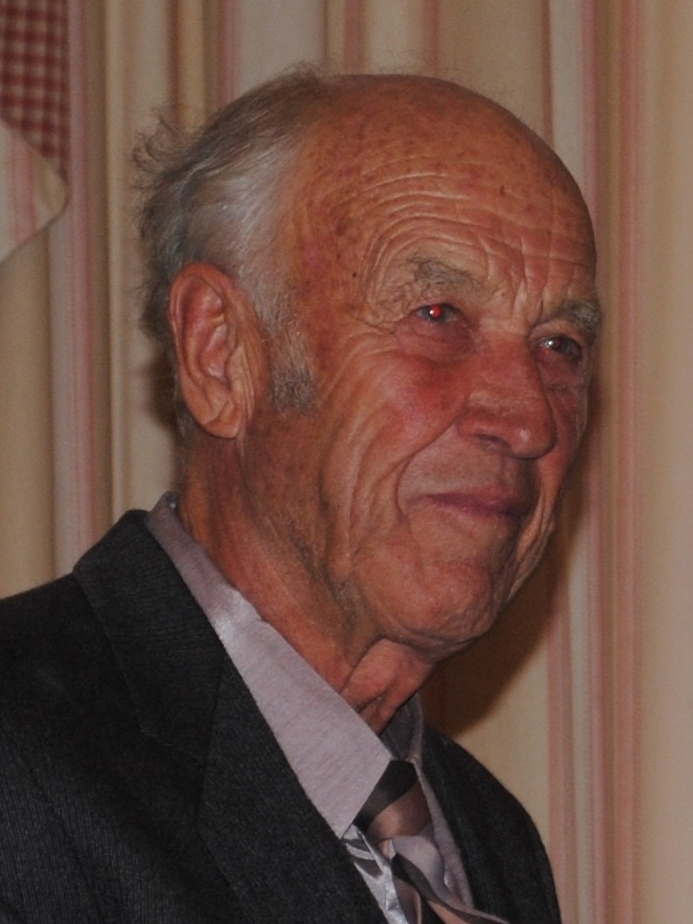
Fritz Eisenhofer

=== August ===
- 4 August – Tane Norton, rugby union player (Mid Canterbury, Canterbury, New Zealand Māori, national team) and administrator, president of the New Zealand Rugby Football Union (2003–2005), Tom French Cup (1973, 1974) (born 1942).
- 7 August
  - Gillian Bibby, composer, pianist, and music teacher (born 1945).
  - Murray Powell, deer farmer and conservationist, founder of Hamilton Zoo (born 1931).
- 8 August – Andrew Sykes, animal scientist (Lincoln University) (born 1943).
- 14 August – Neil Wilson, British Empire Games athlete (1950) (born 1930).
- 16 August – Pat Devlin, parks and recreation academic (Lincoln University) and conservationist, Loder Cup (1969) (born 1937).
- 20 August – Forbes Taylor, farmer and politician, president of the Country Party (1969), chairman of Waitaki County Council (1980–1984) (born 1931).
- 21 August
  - Abe Jacobs, professional wrestler (NWA) (born 1928).
  - Chris Martin, boxing trainer (Soulan Pownceby, Daniella Smith, David Tua) and manager (born 1963).
- 22 August
  - Dun Mihaka, Māori activist (born 1942).
  - Ron Palenski, Hall of Fame sports journalist, writer, historian and administrator (born 1945).
- 23 August
  - James Brown, Māori leader (Ngāi Tai ki Tāmaki).
  - Colin Webb, botanist (DSIR) and science administrator (DSIR, Landcare Research, Foundation for Research, Science and Technology), Fellow of the Royal Society of New Zealand (since 1994) (born 1949).
- 24 August – David Crockett, ornithologist, rediscoverer of the Chatham Island tāiko (1978).
- 25 August – Anthony Molteno, ophthalmologist (Stellenbosch University, University of Otago), inventor of the Molteno implant (born 1938).
- 27 August
  - Ann Hurford, local politician, Mayor of Selwyn (1989–1992) (born 1942).
  - David McGee, lawyer and public servant, Clerk of the House of Representatives (1985–2007), King's Counsel (since 2000) (born 1947).
- 30 August
  - Arthur Leong, association footballer (Hamilton Technical Old Boys, national team) (born 1931).
  - Andrea 't Mannetje, epidemiologist (Massey University) (born 1972).
- 31 August — Peter Olds, poet (born 1944).
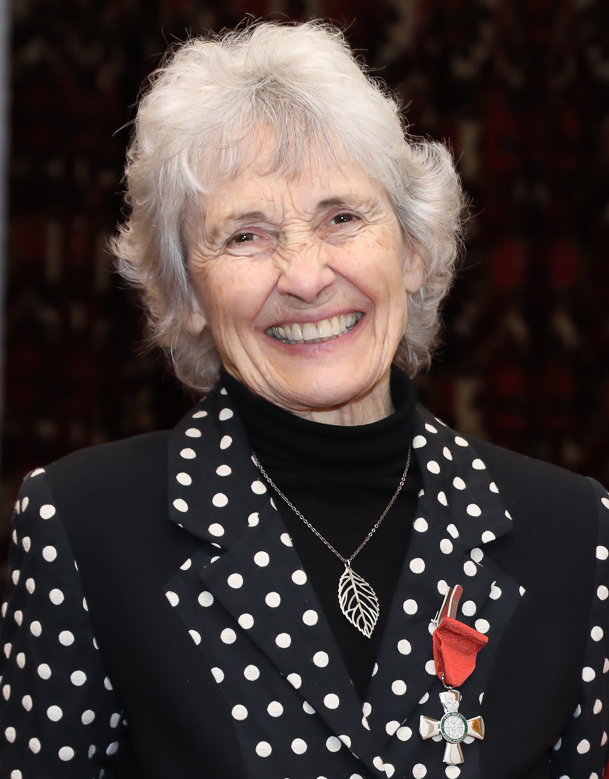
Gillian Bibby

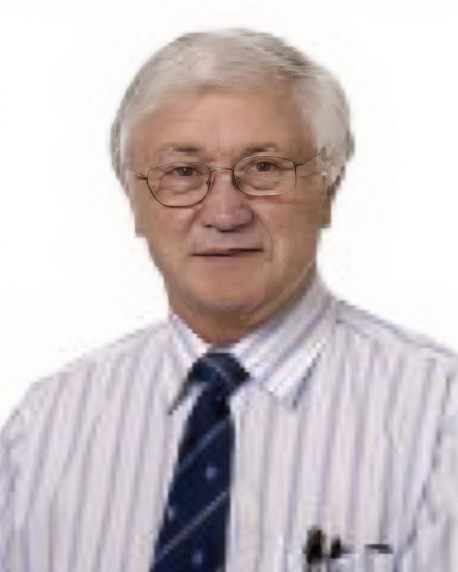
Andrew Sykes

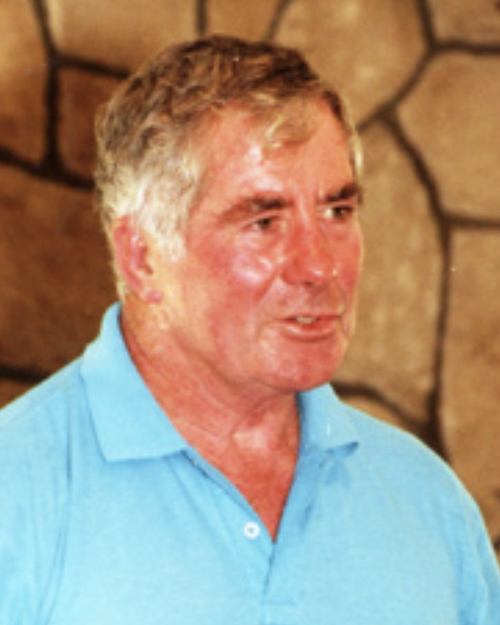
Pat Devlin

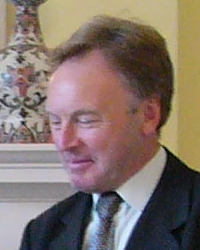
David McGee

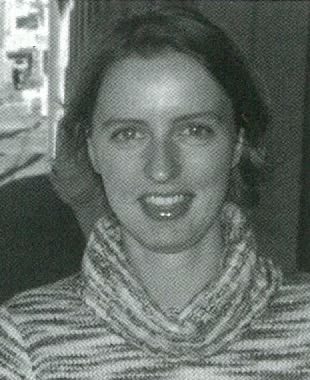
Andrea 't Mannetje

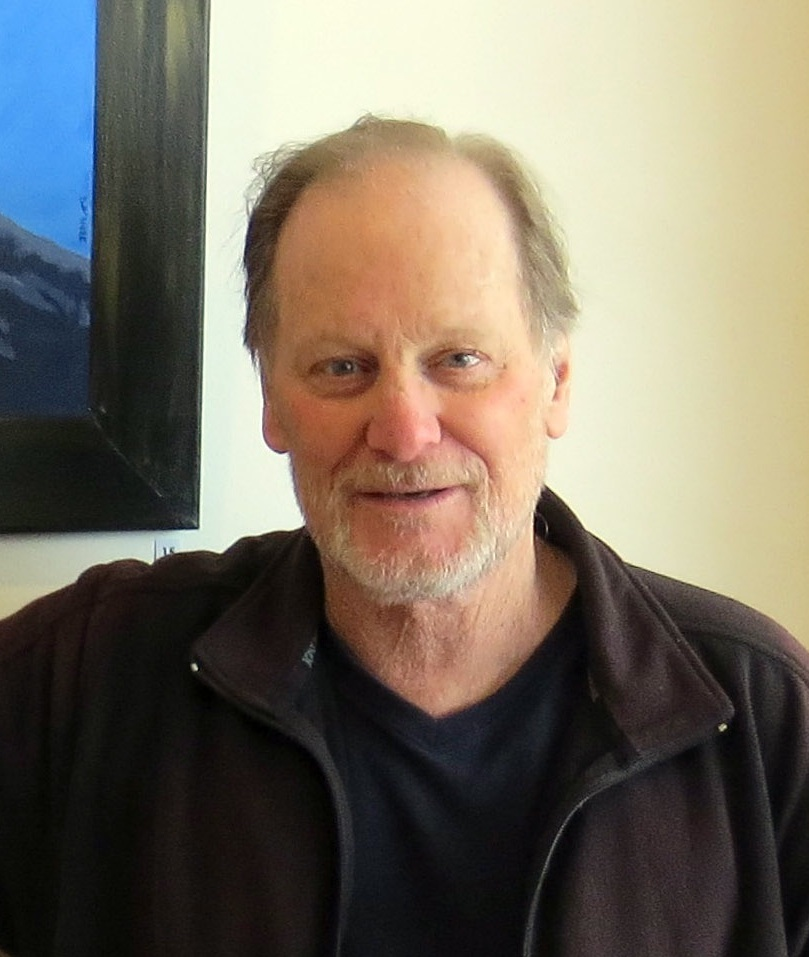
Peter Olds

=== September ===
- 4 September – Jonty Farmer, Olympic sailor (1968, 1976) (born 1945).
- 5 September – Anita Hannen, basketball player (national team) (born 1932).
- 6 September
  - Robyn Broughton, netball player and coach (Southern Sting, Southern Steel, Central Pulse, FastNet Ferns) (born 1943).
  - Julie Cassidy, law academic (Auckland University of Technology, University of Auckland) (born 1965). (death announced on this date)
- 7 September – Wayne Greenstreet, cricketer (Wellington, Central Districts) (born 1949).
- 9 September
  - Michael Gross, local politician and company director, chair of Northland Regional Council (1989–1995), chair of Transfund (1996–2003) (born 1940).
  - Nathan Smith, Paralympic cyclist (2012) (born 1976).
- 14 September – Roy Roper, rugby union player (Taranaki, national team), oldest living All Black (since 2019) (born 1923).
- 15 September – Tony Kreft, rugby union player (Otago, national team) (born 1945).
- 16 September – Len Andersen, lawyer, King's Counsel (since 2019) (born 1952).
- 17 September – Trisha Stratford, clinical neuropsychologist (Married at First Sight), war correspondent, and TV director and producer (born 1951).
- 18 September – Bill Penno, farmer and local politician, president of New Zealand Young Farmers (1968–1969), Canterbury Regional Councillor (1989–2004) (born 1937).
- 22 September – Sir Patu Hohepa, Māori language academic (University of Auckland), Māori Language Commissioner (1997–2007) (born 1936).
- 23 September – Chloe Wright, businesswoman and philanthropist (born c. 1948).
- 24 September
  - Don Evans, bioethicist (University of Wales Swansea, University of Otago) (born 1939).
  - Leon Phillips, physical chemist (University of Canterbury), Fellow of the Royal Society of New Zealand (since 1968), Corday–Morgan Prize (1971), Hector Medal (1979) (born 1935)
- 26 September – Thelma Turner, netball player (national team) (born 1929).
- 27 September – Donal Smith, Olympic (1960) and British Empire and Commonwealth Games (1958) athlete, and academic of English literature (University of Auckland) (born 1934).
- 28 September
  - Marshall Cook, architect, NZIA Gold Medal (2010) (born 1940).
  - John Macdonald, athlete and sports administrator, world masters athletic champion (1979, 1981), chair of the 1981 World Veterans Games organising committee (born 1934).
  - Ted Woodfield, public servant and diplomat, president of the New Zealand University Students' Association (1960–1962), High Commissioner to Australia (1989–1994) (born 1936).
- 29 September – Richie Poulton, clinical psychologist (University of Otago), director of the Dunedin Study (since 2000), Fellow of the Royal Society of New Zealand (since 2010), Liley Medal (2004), Rutherford Medal (2022) (born 1962).
- 30 September – Dame Alison Quentin-Baxter, public and international lawyer, director of the New Zealand Law Commission (1987–1994) (born 1929).
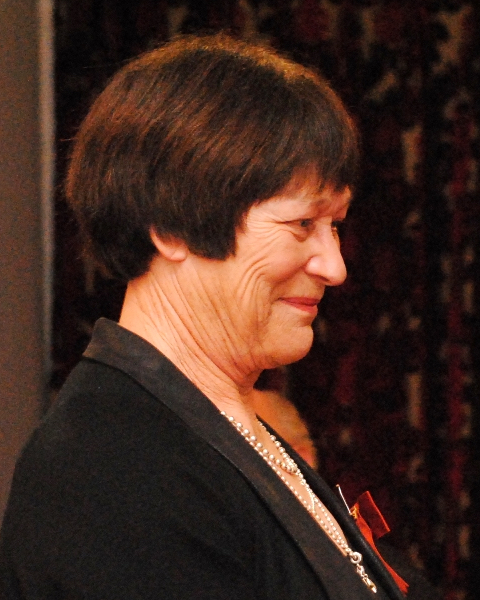
Robyn Broughton

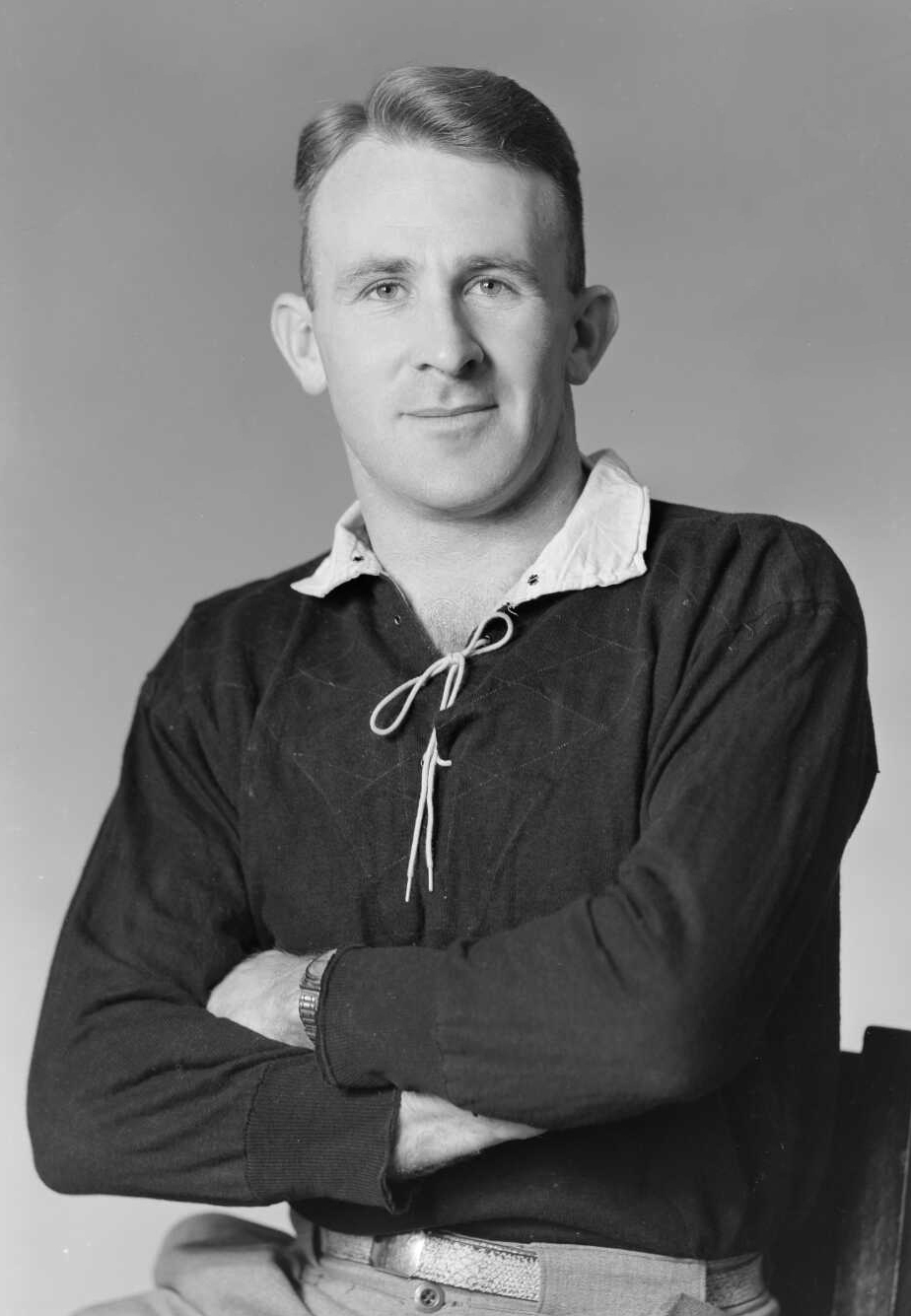
Roy Roper

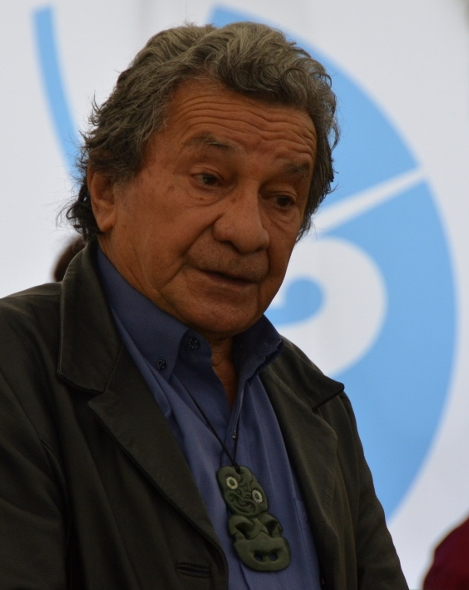
Sir Patu Hohepa

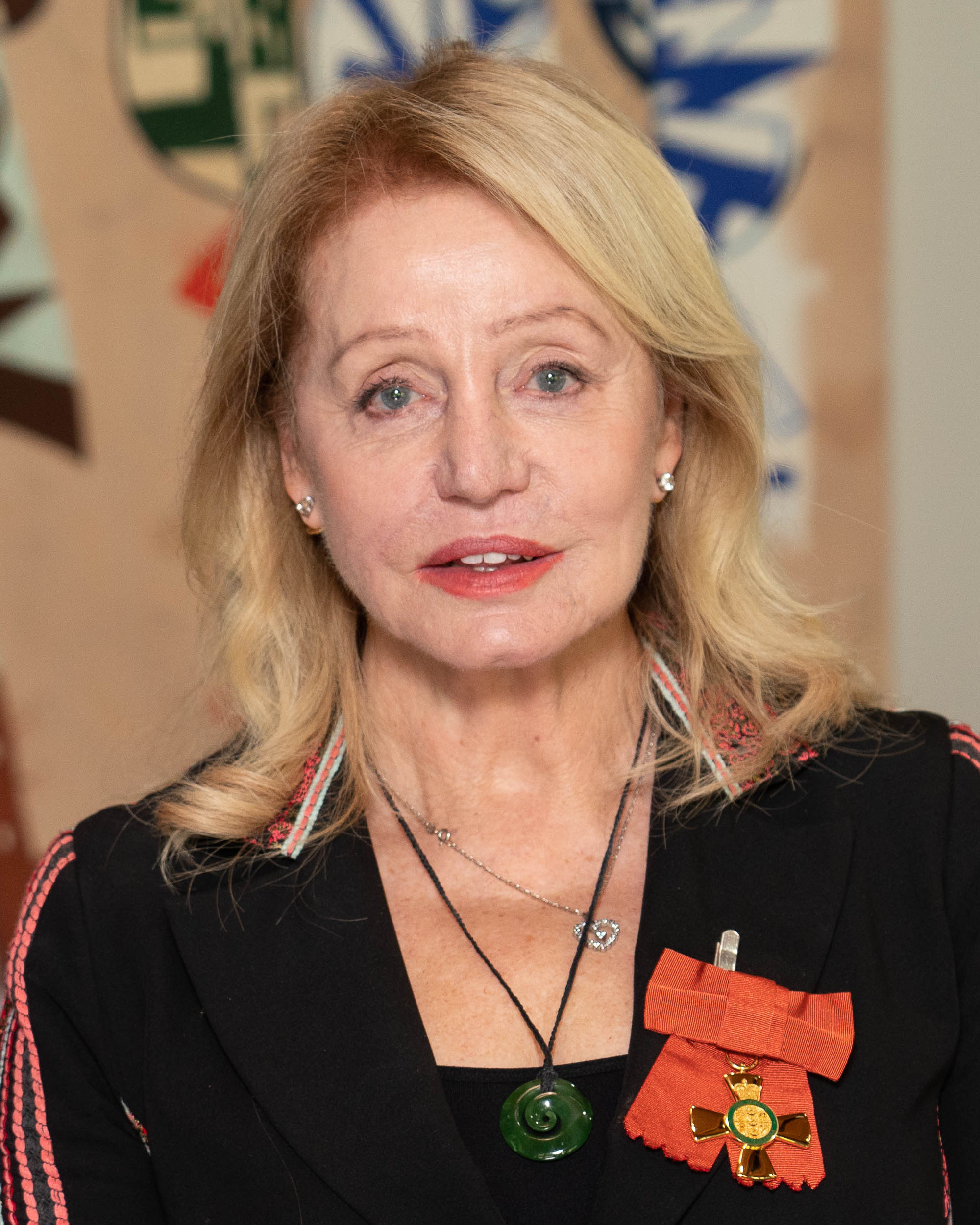
Chloe Wright

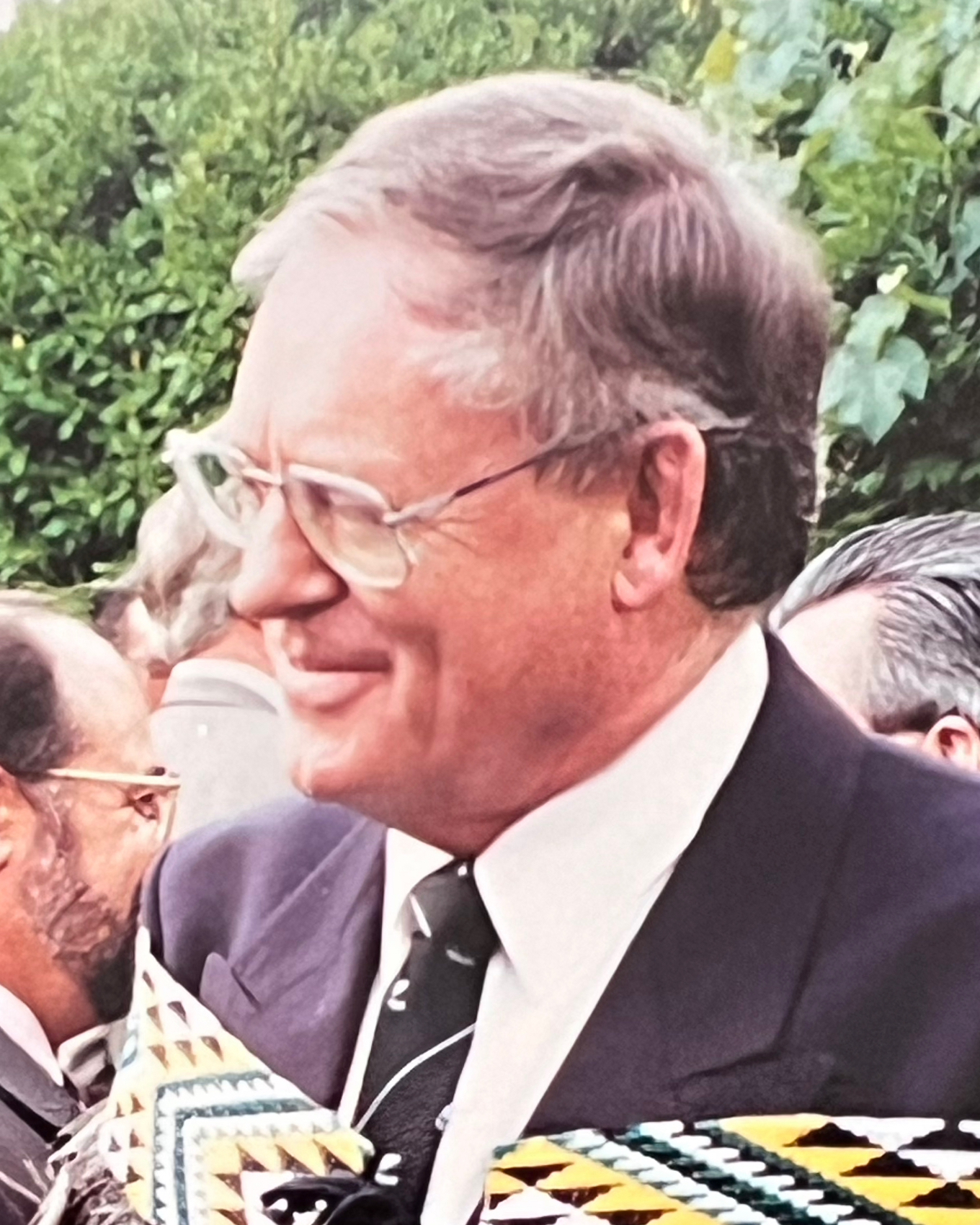
Ted Woodfield

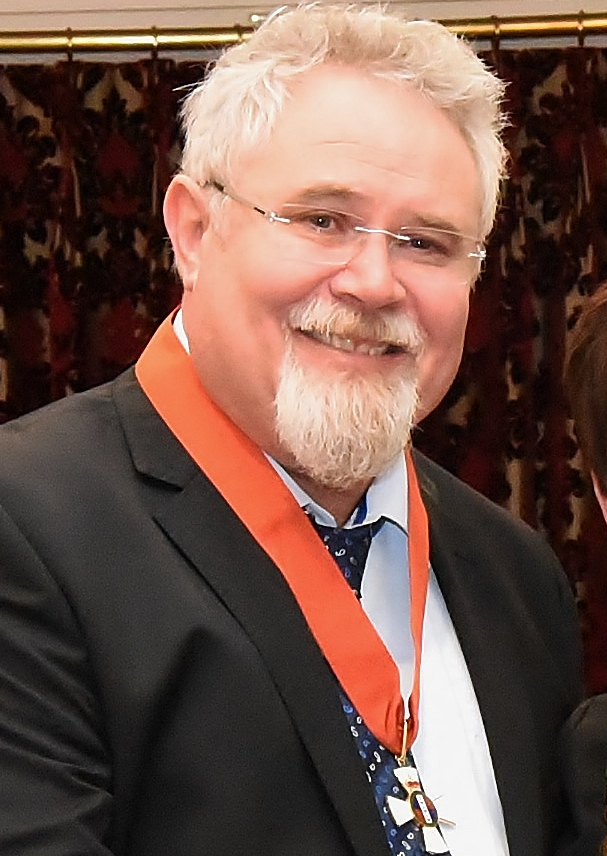
Richie Poulton

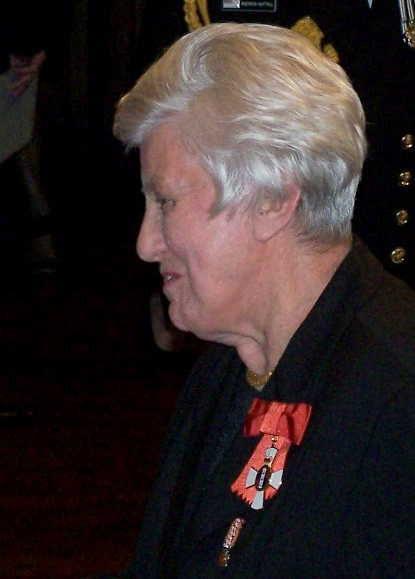
Dame Alison Quentin‑Baxter

=== October ===
- 4 October
  - Bruce Ross, agricultural economist and university administrator, Lincoln University principal / vice-chancellor (1985–1996) (born 1938).
  - Jason Wynyard, woodchopper, 16-time Lumberjack World Championship all-around winner, 14-time Stihl Timbersports Series individual champion (born 1973).
- 5 October – Noeleen Scott, Hall of Fame lawn bowls player, world triples, fours and team champion (1973) (born 1926).
- 7 October – Phyllis Latour, World War II intelligence officer (Special Operations Executive) (born 1921).
- 8 October – Tom Mulholland, mental health advocate (born c. 1962).
- 9 October – Roger Keey, chemical engineering academic (University of Canterbury) and writer, Fellow of the Royal Society of New Zealand (since 1998) (born 1934).
- 10 October – John Tiffin, communication studies academic (Victoria University of Wellington) (born 1932).
- 11 October – Cal Wilson, comedian, voice actor (Kitty Is Not a Cat), radio host (Nova) and television presenter (The Great Australian Bake Off), Billy T Award (1997) (born 1970).
- 12 October – Michael Townsend, educational psychologist (Massey University) (born c. 1946).
- 17 October – Sir Tim Wallis, Hall of Fame aviation entrepreneur and live deer recovery pioneer, founder of Warbirds over Wanaka (1988) (born 1938).
- 18 October
  - Beverley Dunlop, children's author (born 1935).
  - Lynette Skelton, rower and rowing administrator, pioneer of women's rowing in New Zealand (born 1941).
- 21 October – Neil Bruère, veterinary scientist (Massey University) (born 1927).
- 22 October – Hugh Vercoe, local politician, Mayor of Matamata-Piako (1998–2013), Waikato Regional Councillor (2013–2022) (born 1943).
- 23 October – Ralph Mountfort, farmer and local politician, Mayor of Woodville (1986–1989), Tararua District Councillor (1989–1995) (born 1932).
- 26 October — Sir Jon Trimmer, ballet dancer (Sadler's Wells, Royal New Zealand Ballet) and actor (born 1939).
- 30 October – Mirth Solomon, Hall of Fame netball player (national team), umpire and administrator, world champion (1967) (born 1939).
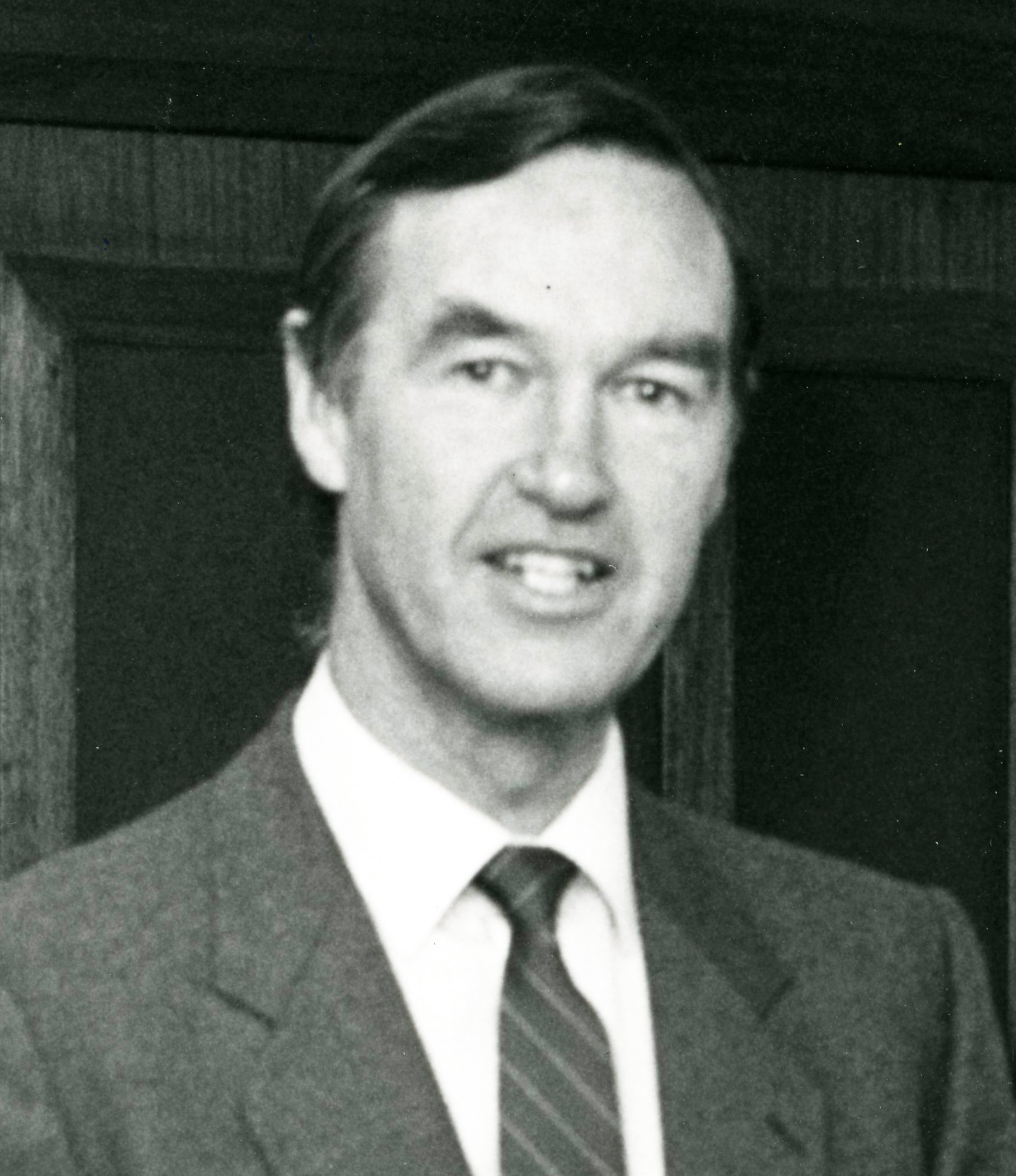
Bruce Ross

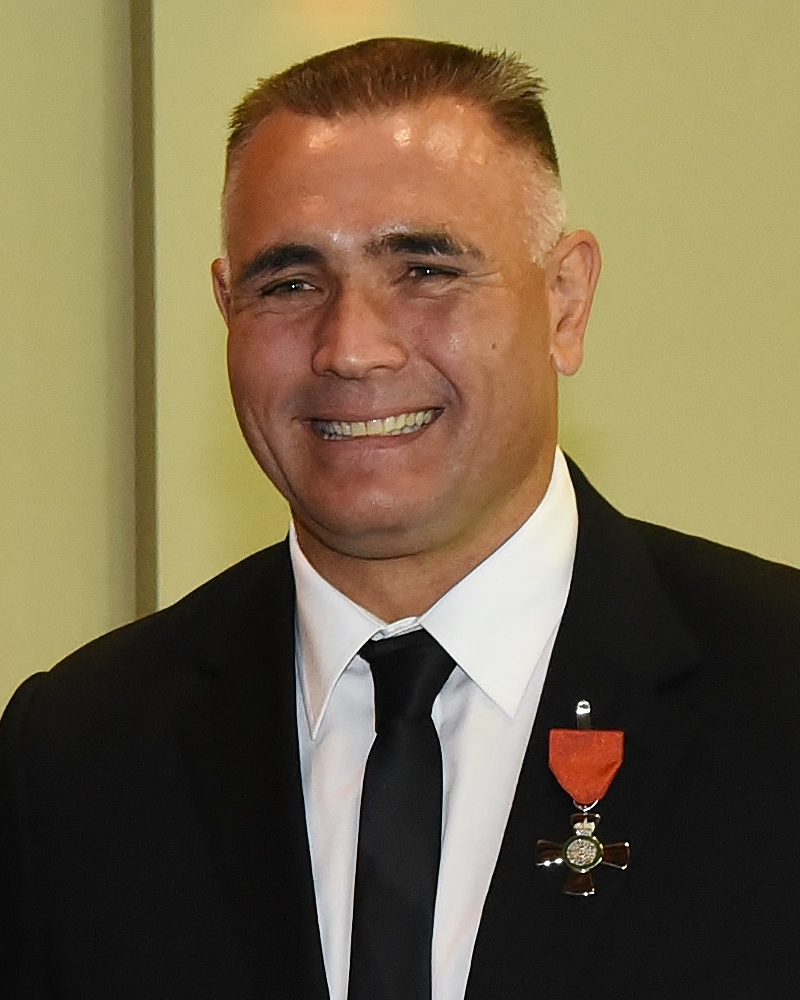
Jason Wynyard

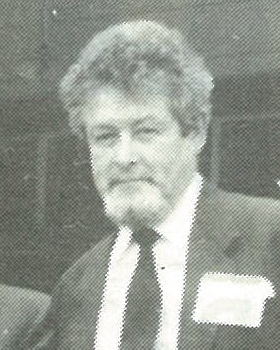
John Tiffin

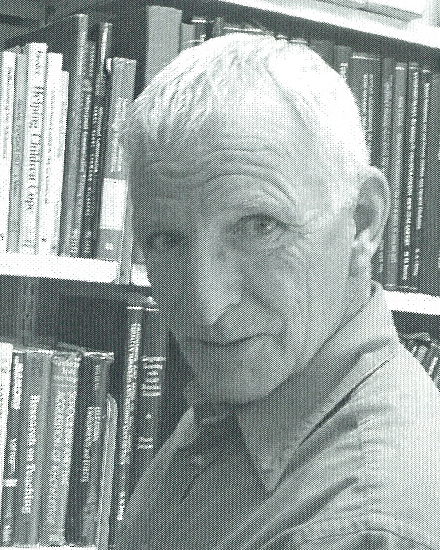
Michael Townsend

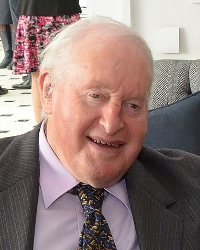
Sir Tim Wallis

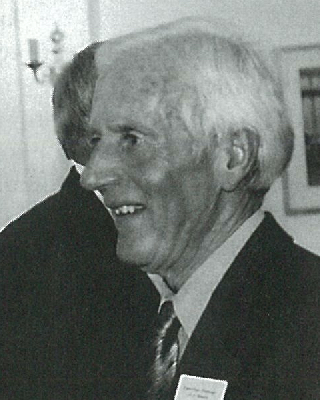
Neil Bruère

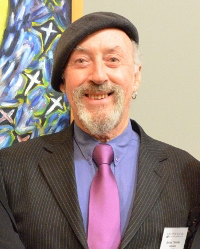
Sir Jon Trimmer

=== November ===
- 1 November – Bob Duckworth, speedway rider (Belle Vue Aces, St Austell Gulls, Newcastle Diamonds) (born 1929).
- 3 November – Patrick Brownsey, botanist and philatelist (Museum of New Zealand Te Papa Tongarewa) (born 1948).
- 4 November – Bill Milbank, art curator, director of the Sarjeant Gallery (1978–2006) (born 1948).
- 10 November – Ewan Fordyce, palaeontologist (University of Otago), Hutton Medal (2012), Fellow of the Royal Society of New Zealand (since 2014) (born 1953).
- 13 November – Jim Traue, librarian, Alexander Turnbull Library chief librarian (1973–1990) (born 1932).
- 14 November – Arthur Parkin, field hockey player (national team), Olympic champion (1976) (born 1952).
- 19 November – Noma Shepherd, community leader (born 1935).
- 23 November – Noel Taylor, athlete, British Empire Games bronze medallist (1950) (born 1923).
- 27 November – Brian Law, organist, choirmaster and conductor, ChristChurch Cathedral director of music (2003–2014) (born 1943).
- 29 November – Rob Sturch, school teacher, principal of Hastings Boys' High School (since 2002).
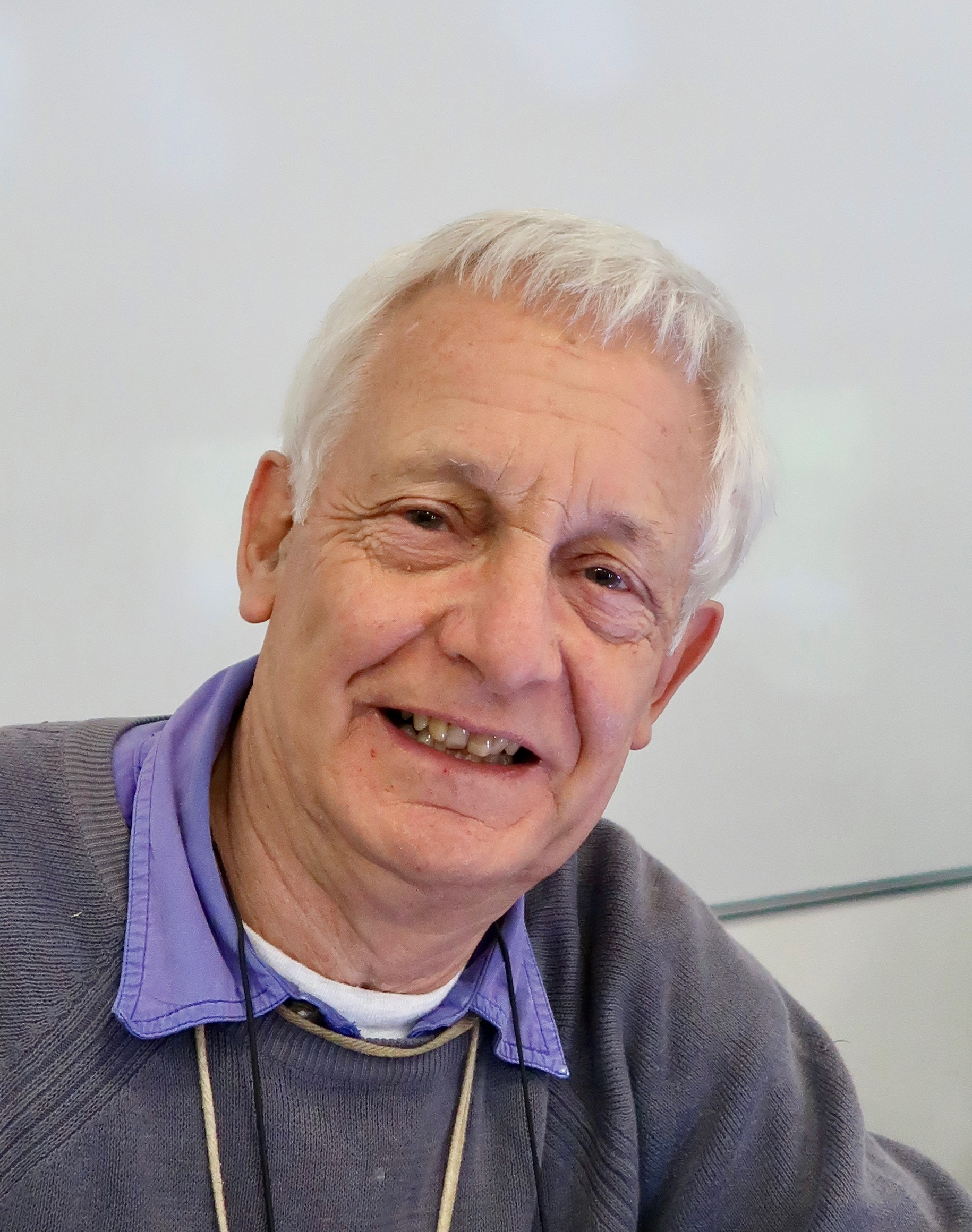
Patrick Brownsey

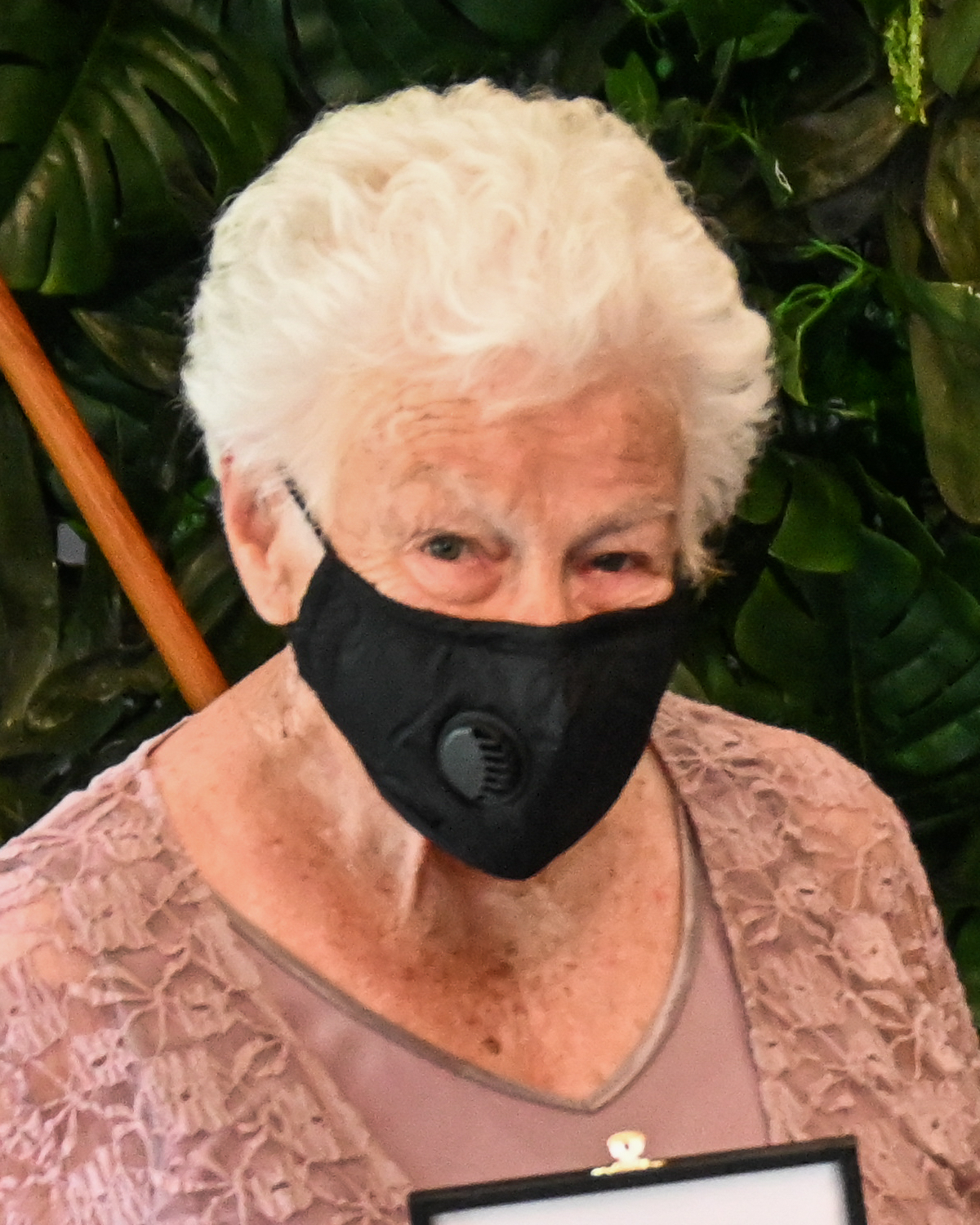
Noma Shepherd

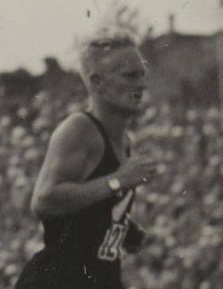
Noel Taylor

=== December ===
- 2 December – Jane Prichard, women's rights advocate, vice-president of the International Council of Women (2006–2012) (born 1936).
- 3 December – Russell Worth, neurosurgeon (Wellington Hospital), co-founder of the Life Flight Trust (1975) (born 1938).
- 5 December – Paul Dibble, sculptor (New Zealand War Memorial, London) (born 1943).
- 6 December – John McBeth, journalist (Asiaweek, Far Eastern Economic Review, The Straits Times) (born 1944).
- 8 December – John McNamara, carcinologist (University of São Paulo) (born 1953).
- 9 December – Bill Kaua, public servant, Anglican minister and Māori cultural advisor (born 1937).
- 10 December – Cliff Simpson, British Empire Games athlete (1950) (born 1928).
- 11 December – Renée, feminist writer and playwright (Wednesday to Come, Pass It On), Prime Minister's Award for Literary Achievement (2018) (born 1929).
- 12 December – John McKay, Olympic boxing coach (1992, 2000) (born 1943).
- 13 December
  - J. G. A. Pocock, historian of political thought (University of Otago, University of Canterbury, Johns Hopkins University) (born 1924).
  - Derek Stirling, cricketer (Central Districts, Wellington, national team) (born 1961).
  - Des White, Hall of Fame rugby league player (Auckland, national team) and coach (Auckland, national team) (born 1927).
- 15 December – Sherryl Jordan, children's and young adults' writer (Winter of Fire), Margaret Mahy Medal (2001) (born 1949).
- 16 December – Peter Bush, photojournalist (born 1930).
- 19 December
  - Norm Coe, Hall of Fame squash player and coach (Philippa Beams) (born 1927).
  - Bruce Gilberd, Anglican cleric, Bishop of Auckland (1985–1994) (born 1938).
- 22 December – Thomas Williams, Roman Catholic cleric, Archbishop of Wellington (1979–2005), cardinal (since 1983), Member of the Order of New Zealand (since 2000) (born 1930).
- 26 December – Ruth Davey, printmaker (born 1923).
- 29 December – Sir Michael Hardie Boys, lawyer, jurist and vice-regal representative, judge of the High Court (1980–1989) and Court of Appeal (1989–1996), governor-general (1996–2001), Privy Counsellor (since 1989) (born 1931).
- 31 December
  - Norm Dewes – urban Māori leader (born 1945).
  - Susi Newborn – co-founder of Greenpeace (born 1950).
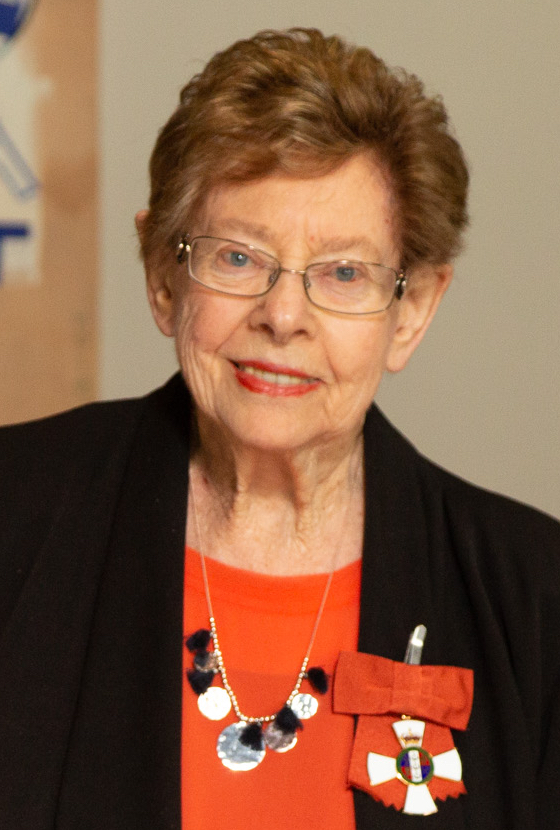
Jane Prichard

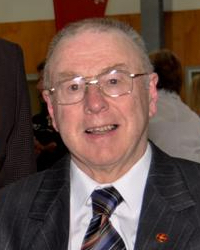
Russell Worth

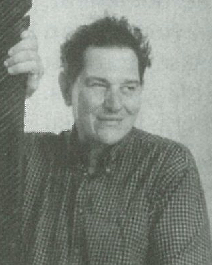
Paul Dibble

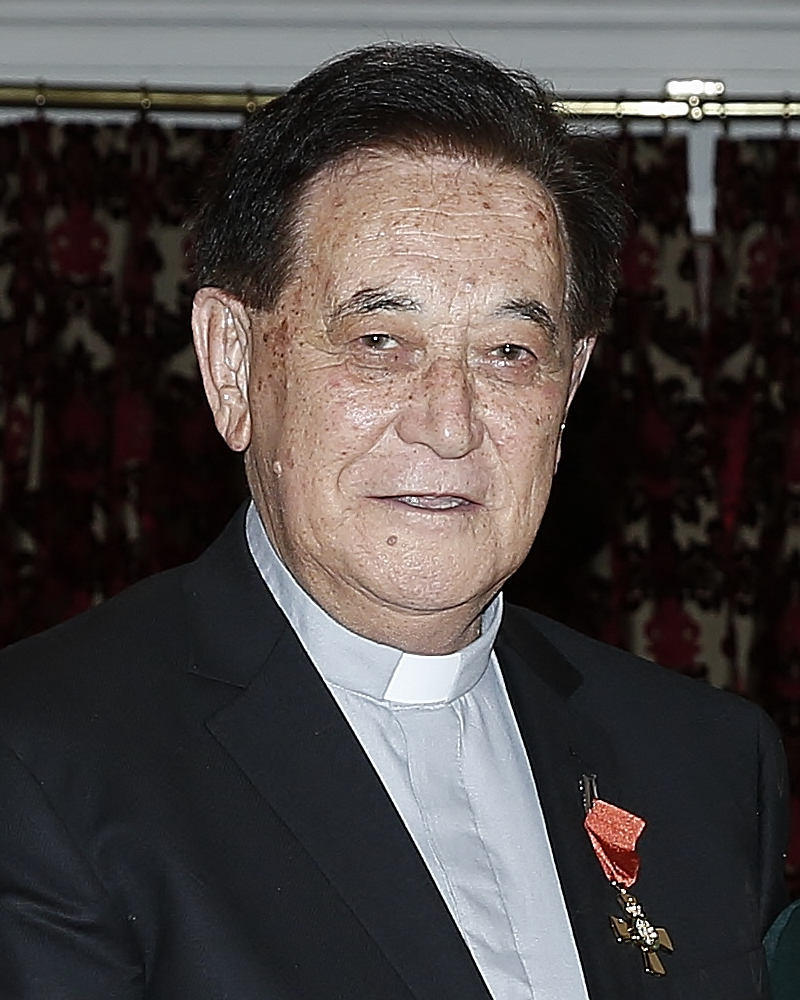
Bill Kaua

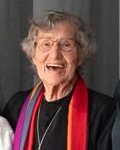
Renée

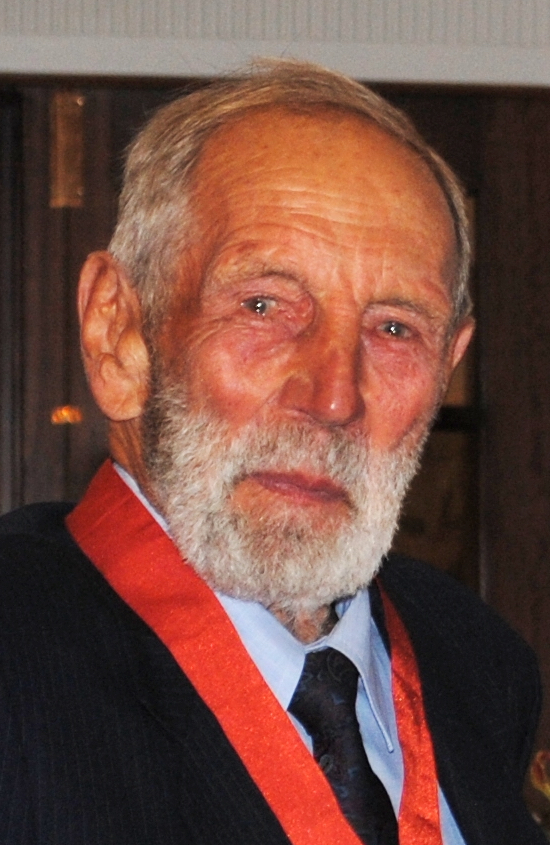
Peter Bush

Tom Williams

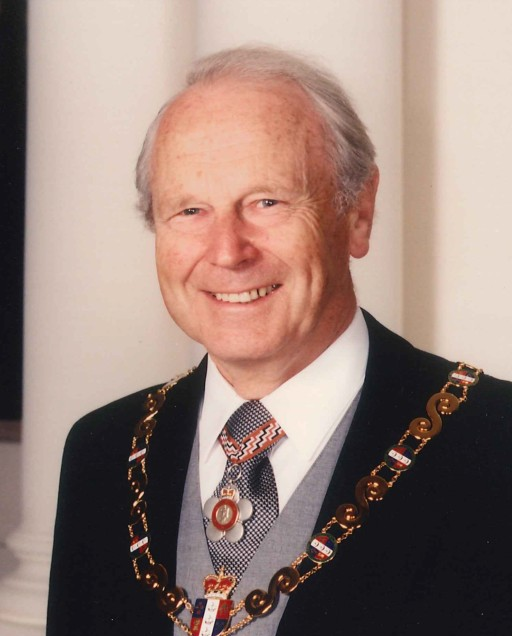
Sir Michael Hardie Boys

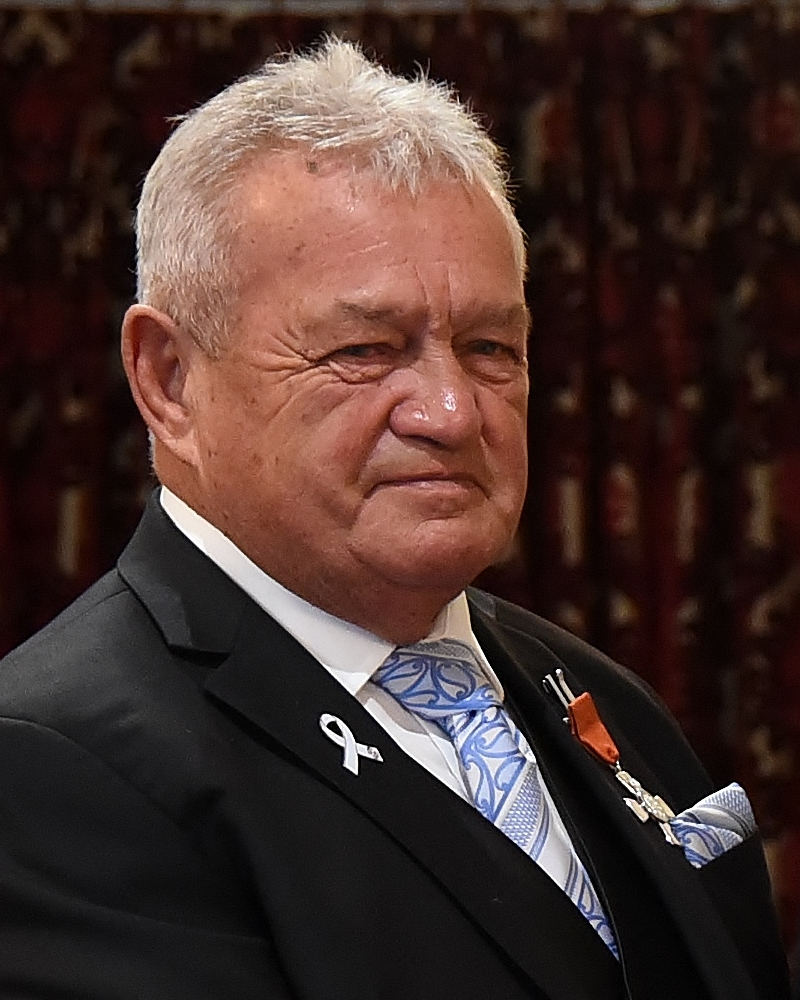
Norm Dewes

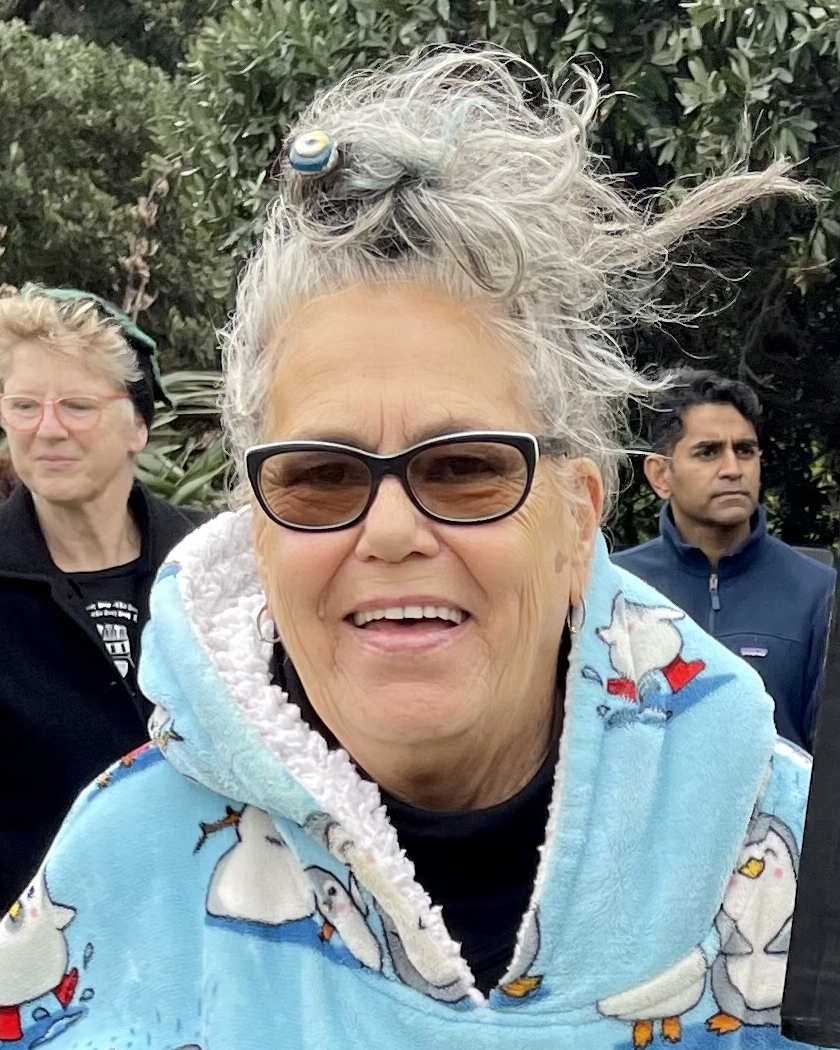
Susi Newborn
