= Athletics at the 1950 British Empire Games – Men's 880 yards =

Men's 880 yards at the Commonwealth Games

The men's 880 yards event at the 1950 British Empire Games was held on 5 and 7 February at the Eden Park in Auckland, New Zealand.

== Medalists ==
Gold	Silver	Bronze
John Parlett; England	Jack Hutchins; Canada	Bill Parnell; Canada

== Results ==
=== Heats ===
Qualification: First 4 in each heat (Q) qualify directly for the final.

Rank	Heat	Name	Nationality	Time	Notes
1	1	Bill Parnell	Canada	1:52.2	Q
2	1	Neil Wilson	New Zealand	1:53.2	Q
3	1	David White	Australia	1:53.2	Q
4	1	Tom White	England	?:??.?	Q
5	1	James Humphreys	Australia	?:??.?	
6	1	Ian Johnson	Southern Rhodesia	?:??.?	
	1	Doug Harris	New Zealand	DNF	
	1	John de Saram	Ceylon	DNS	
1	2	John Parlett	England	1:52.1	Q
2	2	Jack Hutchins	Canada	?:??.?	Q
3	2	Schalk Booysen	South Africa	1:53.5	Q
4	2	Cliff Simpson	New Zealand	?:??.?	Q
5	2	Ezra Henniger	Canada	?:??.?	
6	2	Barry Steel	New Zealand	?:??.?	
	2	Victor Plummer	Australia	DNS	
	2	A. Somapala	Ceylon	DNS	

=== Final ===
Rank	Name	Nationality	Time	Notes
1st place, gold medalist(s)	John Parlett	England	1:53.1	
2nd place, silver medalist(s)	Jack Hutchins	Canada	1:53.4	
3rd place, bronze medalist(s)	Bill Parnell	Canada	1:53.4	
4	David White	Australia	1:53.7	
5	Tom White	England	1:53.9	
6	Cliff Simpson	New Zealand	1:56.0	
7	Schalk Booysen	South Africa	?:??.?	
8	Neil Wilson	New Zealand	?:??.?	
