= Athletics at the 1948 Summer Olympics – Men's 800 metres =

Men's 800 metres at the Games of the XIV Olympiad
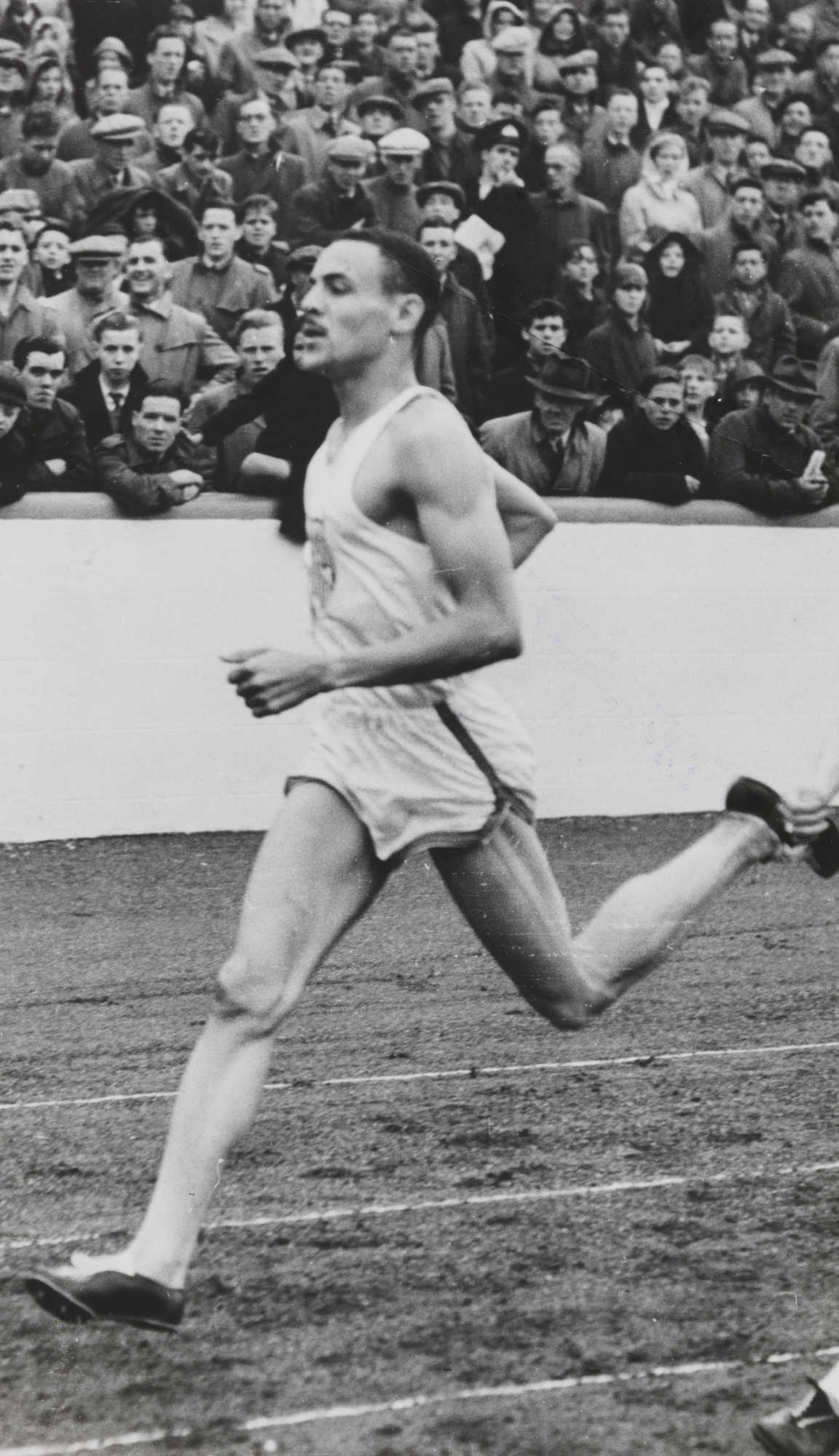
- Venue: Wembley Stadium
- Dates: July 30, 1948 (heats); July 31, 1948 (semifinals); August 2, 1948 (final)
- Competitors: 41 from 24 nations
- Winning time: 1:49.2 OR

Medalists
1st place, gold medalist(s)		Mal Whitfield; United States
2nd place, silver medalist(s)		Arthur Wint; Jamaica
3rd place, bronze medalist(s)		Marcel Hansenne; France

The men's 800 metres event at the 1948 Olympic Games took place July 30, July 31 and August 2. Forty-one athletes from 24 nations competed. The maximum number of athletes per nation had been set at 3 since the 1930 Olympic Congress. The final was won by the American Mal Whitfield. It was the first of Whitfield's two wins in the event, the second of four consecutive American victories, and the fifth overall United States win in the 800 metres. Arthur Wint earned Jamaica's first Olympic medal in their debut games with silver; he would take gold in the 400 metres a few days later. Marcel Hansenne took France's first 800 metres medal with bronze.

== Summary ==
The competitors all started from a crouch start. In the final, Marcel Hansenne bolted from the blocks to take the lead. The tall Arthur Wint worked his way through the crowd and moved into the marking position by the end of the turn. Mal Whitfield smoothly ran around the crowd, past Wint and Hansenne into the lead. Whitfield kept going, extending his lead to five metres uncontested. Ingvar Bengtsson moved forward to challenge Hansenne, holding the edge through the final turn. Coming off the final turn, Wint ran around both of them and set off in chase of Whitfield. He was able to close down a couple of meters but the gap was too much, Whitfield winning easily. Behind them, Herb Barten ran around the outside of Bengtsson and challenged Hansenne to the line, but Hansenne took the bronze.

== Background ==
This was the 11th appearance of the event, which is one of 12 athletics events to have been held at every Summer Olympics. None of the finalists from the pre-war 1936 Games returned. Noted contenders included Mal Whitfield of the United States, Arthur Wint of Jamaica, Doug Harris of New Zealand, and Marcel Hansenne of France.

Egypt, Iceland, Jamaica, South Korea, and Trinidad and Tobago appeared in the event for the first time. Great Britain and the United States each made their 10th appearance, tied for the most among all nations.

== Competition format ==
The event used the three-round format introduced in 1912. There were six first-round heats, each with 7 and 8 athletes (before withdrawals); the top four runners in each heat advanced to the semifinals. There were three semifinals with 8 athletes each; the top three runners in each semifinal advanced to the nine-man final.

== Records ==
These were the standing world and Olympic records (in minutes) prior to the 1948 Summer Olympics.

World record	Rudolf Harbig (GER)	1:46.6	Milan, Italy	15 July 1939
Olympic record	Tommy Hampson (GBR)	1:49.7	Los Angeles, United States	2 August 1932

Mal Whitfield broke the Olympic record with a time of 1:49.2 in the final.

== Schedule ==
All times are British Summer Time (UTC+1).

Date	Time	Round
Friday, 30 July 1948	16:00	Round 1
Saturday, 31 July 1948	15:15	Semifinals
Monday, 2 August 1948	16:00	Final

== Results ==
=== Round 1 ===
The first four in each heat qualified for the semifinals.

==== Heat 1 ====
Rank	Athlete	Nation	Time	Notes
1	Marcel Hansenne	France	1:54.6	Q
2	John Parlett	Great Britain	1:55.0	Q
3	Bill Ramsay	Australia	1:55.0	Q
4	Karl Volkmer	Switzerland	1:55.3	Q
5	Adán Torres	Argentina	1:56.7	
6	Lee Yun-seok	South Korea	2:01.4	
7	Rashid Khadr	Egypt	Unknown	

==== Heat 2 ====
Rank	Athlete	Nation	Time	Notes
1	Herb Barten	United States	1:55.6	Q
2	Doug Harris	New Zealand	1:56.6	Q
2	Tom White	Great Britain	1:56.6	Q
4	Raymond Rosier	Belgium	1:56.7	Q
5	Vasilios Mavroidis	Greece	1:57.4	
6	Antero Mongrut	Peru	1:58.7	
7	Cahit Önel	Turkey	Unknown	
—	Herluf Christensen	Denmark	DNF	

==== Heat 3 ====
Rank	Athlete	Nation	Time	Notes
1	Niels Holst-Sørensen	Denmark	1:54.2	Q
2	Bjørn Vade	Norway	1:54.2	Q
3	Bob Chambers	United States	1:54.3	Q
4	Joseph Brys	Belgium	1:55.4	Q
5	Óskar Jónsson	Iceland	1:55.4	
6	Bill Parnell	Canada	1:55.7	
7	Juan Adarraga	Spain	Unknown	
—	Joe Kelly	Ireland	DNS	

==== Heat 4 ====
Rank	Athlete	Nation	Time	Notes
1	Arthur Wint	Jamaica	1:53.9	Q
2	Frits de Ruijter	Netherlands	1:54.4	Q
3	Josy Barthel	Luxembourg	1:54.8	Q
4	Václav Winter	Czechoslovakia	1:55.1	Q
5	Ezra Henniger	Canada	1:55.4	
6	Wilfred Tull	Trinidad and Tobago	1:55.7	
7	Seydi Dinçtürk	Turkey	Unknown	

==== Heat 5 ====
Rank	Athlete	Nation	Time	Notes
1	Olle Ljunggren	Sweden	1:56.1	Q
2	Robert Chef d'Hôtel	France	1:56.2	Q
3	Hans Streuli	Switzerland	1:56.5	Q
4	Harry Tarraway	Great Britain	1:56.6	Q
5	Guillermo Avalos	Argentina	1:56.6	
6	Riza Maksut İşman	Turkey	2:01.1	
7	Georgios Karageorgos	Greece	Unknown	

==== Heat 6 ====
Rank	Athlete	Nation	Time	Notes
1	Mal Whitfield	United States	1:52.8	Q
2	Ingvar Bengtsson	Sweden	1:52.9	Q
3	Jack Hutchins	Canada	1:55.5	Q
4	Gaston Mayordomo	France	1:55.7	Q
5	Stylianos Stratakos	Greece	2:02.2	
—	Bruno Schneider	Austria	DNS	
—	Dermot McDermott	Ireland	DNS	

=== Semifinals ===
==== Semifinal 1 ====
Rank	Athlete	Nation	Time (hand)	Time (auto)	Notes
1	Marcel Hansenne	France	1:50.5	1:50.6	Q
2	Mal Whitfield	United States	1:50.7	1:50.89	Q
3	John Parlett	Great Britain	1:50.9	1:50.90	Q
4	Jack Hutchins	Canada	1:52.6	1:52.75	
5	Joseph Brys	Belgium	1:53.2	1:53.34	
6	Josy Barthel	Luxembourg	1:54.6	1:54.78	
7	Bjørn Vade	Norway	Unknown	1:55.39	
—	Karl Volkmer	Switzerland	DNF		

==== Semifinal 2 ====
Rank	Athlete	Nation	Time	Notes
1	Ingvar Bengtsson	Sweden	1:51.2	Q
2	Arthur Wint	Jamaica	1:52.7	Q
3	Bob Chambers	United States	1:52.9	Q
4	Gaston Mayordomo	France	1:54.3	
5	Bill Ramsay	Australia	1:54.9	
6	Václav Winter	Czechoslovakia	1:57.7	
—	Harry Tarraway	Great Britain	DNF	
—	Doug Harris	New Zealand	DNF	

==== Semifinal 3 ====
Rank	Athlete	Nation	Time	Notes
1	Herb Barten	United States	1:51.7	Q
2	Robert Chef d'Hôtel	France	1:52.0	Q
3	Niels Holst-Sørensen	Denmark	1:52.4	Q
4	Olle Ljunggren	Sweden	1:52.5	
5	Tom White	Great Britain	1:53.0	
6	Frits de Ruijter	Netherlands	1:54.6	
7	Raymond Rosier	Belgium	Unknown	
—	Hans Streuli	Switzerland	DNF	

=== Final ===
Rank	Athlete	Nation	Time (hand)	Time (auto)	Notes
1st place, gold medalist(s)	Mal Whitfield	United States	1:49.2	1:49.3	OR
2nd place, silver medalist(s)	Arthur Wint	Jamaica	1:49.5	1:49.58	
3rd place, bronze medalist(s)	Marcel Hansenne	France	1:49.8	1:50.08	
4	Herb Barten	United States	1:50.1	1:50.34	
5	Ingvar Bengtsson	Sweden	1:50.5	1:50.86	
6	Bob Chambers	United States	1:52.1	1:52.14	
7	Robert Chef d'Hôtel	France	1:53.0	1:54.19	
8	John Parlett	Great Britain	1:53.4	1:56.27	
9	Niels Holst-Sørensen	Denmark	1:54.0	1:56.36	
