= 1948 NCAA track and field championships =

1948 NCAA Track and Field Championships
- Team Champion: Minnesota Golden Gophers track and field (1st title)
- Edition: 27th
- Dates: June 18–19, 1948
- Host city: Minneapolis, Minnesota
- Venue: Memorial Stadium

The 1948 NCAA Track and Field Championships were held in Minneapolis, Minnesota in June 1948. The University of Minnesota won the team title. Two NCAA meet records were broken, and one American record was tied, at the event. Fortune Gordien was the high point scorer for Minnesota as he won the discus thrown and finished second in the shot put, accounting for 18 of Minnesota's points.

Clyde "Smackover" Scott tied the world record in the 110-meter high hurdles with a time of 13.7 seconds.

Mel Patton was the only athlete to win two events at the meet. Patton won both the 100-meter and 200-meter dashes.

Charlie Fonville of the University of Michigan won the shot put competition with a distance of 54 feet, defending his 1947 NCAA title.

== Team scoring ==
1. Minnesota – 46
2. University of Southern California – 41 1/2
3. Texas – 40
4. Illinois – 34 1/4
5. California – 19 1/4

== Track events ==
100-meter dash
1. Mel Patton, Univ. South. Calif.
2. Don Anderson, California
3. Charles Parker, Texas

110-meter high hurdles
1. Clyde Scott, Arkansas
2. W.F. Porter, Northwestern
3. Craig Dixon, UCLA

200-meter dash
1. Mel Patton, Univ. South. Calif.
2. Charles Parker, Texas
3. Paul Bienz, Tulane

400-meter dash
1. Norman Rucks, South Carolina
2. Arthur Harnden, Texas A&M
3. John Hammack, U.S. Military Academy

400-meter hurdles
1. George Walker, Illinois
2. Jeffrey Kirk, Penn
3. Ron Frazier, Univ. South. Calif.

800-meter run
1. Mal Whitfield, Ohio State
2. Jack Dianetti, Michigan State
3. Bob Chambers, Univ. South. Calif.

1,500-meter run
1. Don Gehrman, Wisconsin
2. Herbert Barten, Michigan
3. Roland Sink, Univ. South. Calif.

3,000-meter steeplechase
1. Browning Ross, Villanova
2. W.O. Overton, Alabama Polytechnic Inst.
3. James Kittell, Notre Dame

5,000-meter run
1. Jerry Thompson, Texas
2. Horace Ashenfelter, Penn State
3. Quentin Briesford, Ohio Wesleyan

== Field events ==
Broad jump
1. Willie Steele, San Diego State – 24 feet, 11 1/2 inches
2. James Holland, Northwestern - 24 feet, 6 1/2 inches
3. Lorenzo Wright, Wayne – 24 feet, 5 1/4 inches

High jump
1. Dwight Eddleman, Illinois – 6 feet, 7 inches
1. Irving Mondschein, NYU – 6 feet, 7 inches
3. Charles Hangar, California – 6 feet, 6 inches
3. Vern McGrew, Rice – 6 feet, 6 inches
3. Lou Irons, Illinois – 6 feet, 6 inches
3. Tom Scofield, Kansas – 6 feet, 6 inches

Pole vault
1. Warren Bateman, Colorado – 14 feet
1. George Rasmussen, Oregon – 14 feet
3. Harry Cooper, Minnesota – 13 feet, 10 inches

Discus throw
1. Fortune Gordien, Minnesota – 164 feet, 6 1/2 inches
2. Victor Frank, Yale – 164 feet, 3 2/3 inches
3. George Kadera, Texas A&M – 155 feet, 1 1/2 inches

Javelin
1. Frank Held, Stanford – 209 feet, 8 inches
2. Francis Friedenbach – 204 feet, 5 1/2 inches
3. Frank Guess, Texas – 199 feet

Shot put
1. Charlie Fonville, Michigan – 54 feet, 7 inches
2. Fortune Gordien, Minnesota – 52 feet, 7 3/8 inches
3. Rollin Prather, Kansas State – 52 feet, 3 7/8 inch

Hammer throw
1. Samuel H. Felton, Jr. – 170 feet, 9 1/4 inches
2. George Marsanskis, Maine – 170 feet, 5 inches
3. Jim Burnham, Dartmouth – 168 feet

Hop, step and jump
1. Lloyd Lamois, Minnesota – 45 feet, 10 inches
2. John Gough, Oklahoma – 45 feet, 7 1/2 inches
3. John Robertson, Texas – 44 feet, 9 1/2 inches

== See also ==
- Athletics at the 1948 Summer Olympics
- NCAA Men's Outdoor Track and Field Championship
