= Athletics at the 1952 Summer Olympics – Men's 800 metres =

Men's 800 metres at the Games of the XV Olympiad
- Dates: July 20, 1952 (heats); July 21, 1952 (semifinals); July 22, 1952 (final)
- Competitors: 50 from 32 nations
- Winning time: 1:49.2 =OR

Medalists
1st place, gold medalist(s)		Mal Whitfield; United States
2nd place, silver medalist(s)		Arthur Wint; Jamaica
3rd place, bronze medalist(s)		Heinz Ulzheimer; Germany

The men's 800 metres event at the 1952 Olympics took place between July 20 and July 22. Fifty athletes from 32 nations competed. The maximum number of athletes per nation had been set at 3 since the 1930 Olympic Congress. The final was won by the American Mal Whitfield.

Whitfield's win was his second (making him the second man to repeat in the 800 metres), as well as the third consecutive (in a streak that would reach four) and sixth overall victory for the United States. Only 0.2 seconds after Whitfield, Arthur Wint became the fifth man to earn a second medal of any color in the 800 metres, repeating his 1948 silver. Heinz Ulzheimer was the third German man to win an 800 metres medal, with the nation taking bronze in 1908 and 1928 as well as Ulzheimer's in 1952.

== Summary ==
Starting from a waterfall start, most competitors were allowed to and chose to use a crouch start. Returning silver medalist Arthur Wint sprinted to the lead with Heinz Ulzheimer moving into a tight marking position with Gunnar Nielsen and Günther Steines sprinting to keep up. On the home stretch for the first time, defending champion Mal Whitfield moved forward, past the other chasers into a marking position on Ulzheimer. Wint continued to lead down the backstretch, then Whitfield accelerated past Ulzheimer, who turned to look, then at the beginning of the turn, Wint. It was a deja vu for Wint, seeing Whitfield ahead of him on the final turn of the Olympics. The first five were separated from the rest of the pack, Whitfield pulling away to defend his championship. Wint couldn't make any progress on Whitfield but held off the battle behind him. Steines lost ground, getting passed by a big rush by Albert Webster, but Nielsen pressed Ulzheimer to the line, Ulzheimer taking bronze with a lean then in the next step doing a face plant to the track.

Whitfield equalled the Olympic record he had set in London four years earlier, meaning he ran exactly the same time 1:49.2 in both races. Wint was a tenth of a second faster. Whitfield became the second man after Douglas Lowe to defend the 800 metres title. Peter Snell and David Rudisha have since equalled the feat.

== Background ==
This was the 12th appearance of the event, which is one of 12 athletics events to have been held at every Summer Olympics. Only two of the finalists from the 1948 Games returned, but they were the top two: gold medalist Mal Whitfield of the United States and silver medalist Arthur Wint of Jamaica.

Cuba, Ghana, Guatemala, Israel, Pakistan, Puerto Rico, the Soviet Union, Thailand, and Venezuela appeared in the event for the first time. Great Britain and the United States each made their 11th appearance, tied for the most among all nations.

== Competition format ==
The event used the three-round format introduced in 1912. There were eight first-round heats, each with between 5 and 7 athletes; the top three runners in each heat advanced to the semifinals. There were three semifinals with 8 athletes each; the top three runners in each semifinal advanced to the nine-man final.

== Records ==
These were the standing world and Olympic records (in minutes) prior to the 1948 Summer Olympics.

World record	Rudolf Harbig (GER)	1:46.6	Milan, Italy	15 July 1939
Olympic record	Mal Whitfield (USA)	1:49.2	London, United Kingdom	2 August 1948

Mal Whitfield repeated his own Olympic record with a time of 1:49.2 in the final.

== Schedule ==
All times are Eastern European Summer Time (UTC+3)

Date	Time	Round
Sunday, 20 July 1952	16:55	Round 1
Monday, 21 July 1952	16:40	Semifinals
Tuesday, 22 July 1952	16:50	Final

== Results ==
=== Round 1 ===
The first round was held on July 20. The first three runners from each heat advanced to the semifinals.

==== Heat 1 ====
Rank	Athlete	Nation	Time	Notes
1	Lars Wolfbrandt	Sweden	1:55.3	Q
2	Albert Webster	Great Britain	1:55.5	Q
3	Gennady Modoy	Soviet Union	1:55.8	Q
4	Maurice Marshall	New Zealand	1:56.2	
5	Johannes Baumgartner	Switzerland	1:57.1	
6	Mohamed Sanni-Thomas	Ghana	2:05.8	
–	Hugo Nutini	Chile	DNS	

==== Heat 2 ====
Rank	Athlete	Nation	Time	Notes
1	Mal Whitfield	United States	1:52.5	Q
2	Edmund Potrzebowski	Poland	1:52.6	Q
3	Tom White	Great Britain	1:52.7	Q
4	Olavi Talja	Finland	1:52.9	
5	Turhan Göker	Turkey	1:55.9	
6	Evelio Planas	Cuba	1:57.6	
–	Josy Barthel	Luxembourg	DNS	

==== Heat 3 ====
Rank	Athlete	Nation	Time	Notes
1	Jack Hutchins	Canada	1:54.5	Q
2	John Barnes	United States	1:54.5	Q
3	Jenő Bakos	Hungary	1:54.5	Q
4	Roman Korban	Poland	1:54.7	
5	Alam Zeb	Pakistan	1:56.3	
6	Vasilios Mavrodis	Greece	1:58.7	
–	Augusto Robles	Guatemala	DNS	

==== Heat 4 ====
Rank	Athlete	Nation	Time	Notes
1	Reggie Pearman	United States	1:51.6	Q
2	Petro Chevhun	Soviet Union	1:51.8	Q
3	Günther Steines	Germany	1:52.7	Q
4	Louis Desmet	Belgium	1:52.9	
5	René Djian	France	1:54.3	
–	Frank Prince	Panama	DNS	
–	William Fahmy Hanna	Egypt	DNS	

==== Heat 5 ====
Rank	Athlete	Nation	Time	Notes
1	Hans Ring	Sweden	1:53.6	Q
2	Arthur Wint	Jamaica	1:54.2	Q
3	Don MacMillan	Australia	1:55.0	Q
4	Oscar Soetewey	Belgium	1:55.4	
5	Georgy Ivakin	Soviet Union	1:56.4	
6	Frank Rivera	Puerto Rico	1:57.6	
7	Víctorio Solares	Guatemala	2:01.4	
–	Hiroshi Yamamoto	Japan	DNS	

==== Heat 6 ====
Rank	Athlete	Nation	Time	Notes
1	Heinz Ulzheimer	Germany	1:51.4	Q
2	Sohan Singh	India	1:52.0	Q
3	Ludvík Liška	Czechoslovakia	1:52.3	Q
4	John Ross	Canada	1:52.5	
5	Arqemiro Roque	Brazil	1:54.1	
6	Lucien Demuynck	Belgium	1:57.4	
7	Boonpak Kwancharoen	Thailand	2:12.6	
–	John Landy	Australia	DNS	

==== Heat 7 ====
Rank	Athlete	Nation	Time	Notes
1	Audun Boysen	Norway	1:53.2	Q
2	Urban Cleve	Germany	1:53.4	Q
3	Frank Evans	Great Britain	1:53.8	Q
4	Ekrem Koçak	Turkey	1:54.5	
5	Filemón Camacho	Venezuela	2:00.0	
6	Arie Gill-Glick	Israel	2:00.9	
–	Rainer Pelkonen	Finland	DNS	
–	Jimmy Reardon	Ireland	DNS	

==== Heat 8 ====
Rank	Athlete	Nation	Time	Notes
1	Patrick El Mabrouk	France	1:52.0	Q
2	Gunnar Nielsen	Denmark	1:53.0	Q
3	Bill Parnell	Canada	1:53.1	Q
4	Yoshitaka Muroya	Japan	1:54.0	
5	Fred Lüthi	Switzerland	1:55.0	
6	Erkki Rönnholm	Finland	1:55.7	
7	Guðmundur Lárusson	Iceland	1:56.5	
–	Vasilios Sillis	Greece	DNS	

=== Semifinals ===
The fastest three runners in each of the three heats advanced to the final round.

==== Semifinal 1 ====
Rank	Athlete	Nation	Time (hand)	Time (automatic)	Notes
1	Gunnar Nielsen	Denmark	1:50.0	1:50.02	Q
2	Mal Whitfield	United States	1:50.1	1:50.15	Q
3	Albert Webster	Great Britain	1:50.1	1:50.26	Q
4	Audun Boysen	Norway	1:50.4	1:50.57	
5	Urban Cleve	Germany	1:51.6	1:51.77	
6	Bill Parnell	Canada	1:52.7	1:52.92	
7	Pyotr Chevgun	Soviet Union	1:52.8	1:53.25	
8	Don MacMillan	Australia	1:58.4	–	

==== Semifinal 2 ====
Rank	Athlete	Nation	Time (hand)	Time (automatic)	Notes
1	Arthur Wint	Jamaica	1:52.7	1:52.88	Q
2	Günther Steines	Germany	1:52.9	1:52.99	Q
3	Hans Ring	Sweden	1:53.0	1:53.27	Q
4	John Barnes	United States	1:53.4	1:53.54	
5	Tom White	Great Britain	1:53.6	1:53.79	
6	Ludvík Liška	Czechoslovakia	1:54.8	1:55.04	
7	Gennady Modoy	Soviet Union	1:55.7	1:56.12	
–	Patrick El Mabrouk	France	DNS	–	

==== Semifinal 3 ====
Rank	Athlete	Nation	Time (hand)	Time (automatic)	Notes
1	Heinz Ulzheimer	Germany	1:51.9	1:52.07	Q
2	Lars Wolfbrandt	Sweden	1:52.4	1:52.59	Q
3	Reggie Pearman	United States	1:52.5	1:52.70	Q
4	Jack Hutchins	Canada	1:52.8	1:52.81	
5	Edmund Potrzebowski	Poland	1:53.7	1:54.03	
6	Sohan Singh	India	1:54.9	1:54.84	
7	Jenő Bakos	Hungary	1:55.5	1:55.70	
8	Frank Evans	Great Britain	1:56.8	1:56.99	

=== Final ===
Rank	Athlete	Nation	Time (hand)	Time (automatic)	Notes
1st place, gold medalist(s)	Mal Whitfield	United States	1:49.2	1:49.34	=OR
2nd place, silver medalist(s)	Arthur Wint	Jamaica	1:49.4	1:49.63	
3rd place, bronze medalist(s)	Heinz Ulzheimer	Germany	1:49.7	1:49.78	
4	Gunnar Nielsen	Denmark	1:49.7	1:49.84	
5	Albert Webster	Great Britain	1:50.2	1:50.47	
6	Günther Steines	Germany	1:50.6	1:50.81	
7	Reggie Pearman	United States	1:52.1	1:52.31	
8	Lars Wolfbrandt	Sweden	1:52.1	1:52.38	
9	Hans Ring	Sweden	1:54.0	1:54.23	
