= 1946 European Athletics Championships – Men's 800 metres =

Men's 800 metres at the European Athletics Championships

The men's 800 metres at the 1946 European Athletics Championships was held in Oslo, Norway, at Bislett Stadion on 22 and 24 August 1946.

== Medalists ==
Gold	Rune Gustafsson; Sweden
Silver	Niels Holst-Sørensen; Denmark
Bronze	Marcel Hansenne; France

== Results ==
=== Final ===
24 August

Rank	Name	Nationality	Time	Notes
1st place, gold medalist(s)	Rune Gustafsson	Sweden	1:51.0	
2nd place, silver medalist(s)	Niels Holst-Sørensen	Denmark	1:51.1	
3rd place, bronze medalist(s)	Marcel Hansenne	France	1:51.2	
4	Olle Ljunggren	Sweden	1:51.4	
5	Thomas White	Great Britain	1:51.5	
6	Robert Chef d’Hôtel	France	1:53.0	
7	Jørgen Heller Andersen	Denmark	1:53.7	
8	Richard Brancart	Belgium	2:02.2	

=== Heats ===
22 August

==== Heat 1 ====
Rank	Name	Nationality	Time	Notes
1	Rune Gustafsson	Sweden	1:51.1	Q
2	Marcel Hansenne	France	1:52.2	Q
3	Jørgen Heller Andersen	Denmark	1:52.2	Q
4	Richard Brancart	Belgium	1:53.5	Q
5	Joseph Barthel	Luxembourg	1:56.1	
6	Óskar Jónsson	Iceland	1:56.1	NR
7	Dagfinn Fløisand	Norway	1:58.4	
8	Jan Staniszewski	Poland	2:00.7	

==== Heat 2 ====
Rank	Name	Nationality	Time	Notes
1	Niels Holst-Sørensen	Denmark	1:54.2	Q
2	Olle Ljunggren	Sweden	1:54.7	Q
3	Robert Chef d'Hôtel	France	1:54.8	Q
4	Thomas White	Great Britain	1:54.8	Q
5	Karl Volkmer	Switzerland	1:55.0	
6	Runar Björklöf	Finland	1:55.8	
7	Tomas Sale	Czechoslovakia	1:56.7	
8	Kjartan Jóhannsson	Iceland	1:56.7	
9	Kaare Vefling	Norway	1:57.3	

== Participation ==
According to an unofficial count, 17 athletes from 12 countries participated in the event.

- Belgium (1)
- Czechoslovakia (1)
- Denmark (2)
- Finland (1)
- France (2)
- Iceland (2)
- Luxembourg (1)
- Norway (2)
- Poland (1)
- Sweden (2)
- Switzerland (1)
- Great Britain (1)
