= Lüthi =

Lüthi is a surname. Notable people with the surname include:

- Alfred Lüthi (ice hockey) (born 1961), retired Swiss ice hockey player
- Benjamin Lüthi (born 1988), Swiss footballer
- Ernst Lüthi (born 1954), retired Swiss ice hockey player
- Fred Lüthi (born 1930), Swiss middle-distance runner
- Friedrich Lüthi (1850–1913), Swiss sports shooter
- Hans Lüthi (born 1939), former Swiss cyclist
- Harry B. Luthi (1934–2019), American businessman and politician
- Kathrin Lüthi (born 1969), Swiss sprinter
- Kurt Lüthi (1923–2010), Swiss theologian
- Randall Luthi (born 1955), American politician
- Robert Lüthi (born 1958), retired Swiss footballer
- Ruth Lüthi (born 1947), Swiss academic and politician
- Severin Lüthi (born 1976), Swiss tennis coach and former player
- Thomas Lüthi (born 1986), Swiss motorcycle racer
- Urs Lüthi (born 1947), Swiss artist

== See also ==
- Lüthi und Blanc, Swiss German language television drama serial (soap opera)
- Luthy or Lüthy, a surname
