= 1950 European Athletics Championships – Men's 800 metres =

Men's 800 metres at the European Athletics Championships

The men's 800 metres at the 1950 European Athletics Championships was held in Brussels, Belgium, at Heysel Stadium on 23 and 26 August 1950.

== Medalists ==
Gold	John Parlett; Great Britain
Silver	Marcel Hansenne; France
Bronze	Roger Bannister; Great Britain

== Results ==
=== Final ===
26 August

Rank	Name	Nationality	Time	Notes
1st place, gold medalist(s)	John Parlett	Great Britain	1:50.5	CR
2nd place, silver medalist(s)	Marcel Hansenne	France	1:50.7	
3rd place, bronze medalist(s)	Roger Bannister	Great Britain	1:50.7	
4	Ingvar Bengtsson	Sweden	1:51.2	
5	Audun Boysen	Norway	1:51.4	
6	Michel Clare	France	1:51.6	
7	Olle Lindén	Sweden	1:52.3	
8	Joseph Brys	Belgium	1:54.0	
9	Joseph Barthel	Luxembourg	1:58.8	

=== Heats ===
23 August

==== Heat 1 ====
Rank	Name	Nationality	Time	Notes
1	Audun Boysen	Norway	1:51.2	Q
2	Ingvar Bengtsson	Sweden	1:51.5	Q
3	Joseph Barthel	Luxembourg	1:51.7	Q
4	Václav Aim	Czechoslovakia	1:53.0	
5	Gennadiy Modoy	Soviet Union	1:53.1	
6	Magnús Jónsson	Iceland	1:56.2	
7	Telemachos Kanellidis	Greece	1:59.1	

==== Heat 2 ====
Rank	Name	Nationality	Time	Notes
1	Marcel Hansenne	France	1:50.8	Q
2	Olle Lindén	Sweden	1:50.9	Q
3	John Parlett	Great Britain	1:51.9	Q
4	Alfred Langenus	Belgium	1:55.3	
5	Aldo Fracassi	Italy	1:55.3	
6	Pétur Einarsson	Iceland	1:56.7	

==== Heat 3 ====
Rank	Name	Nationality	Time	Notes
1	Roger Bannister	Great Britain	1:53.8	Q
2	Michel Clare	France	1:53.8	Q
3	Joseph Brys	Belgium	1:54.1	Q
4	Matija Hanc	Yugoslavia	1:55.3	
5	Loukas Adamopoulos	Greece	1:57.5	

== Participation ==
According to an unofficial count, 18 athletes from 12 countries participated in the event.

- Belgium (2)
- Czechoslovakia (1)
- France (2)
- Greece (2)
- Iceland (2)
- Italy (1)
- Luxembourg (1)
- Norway (1)
- Soviet Union (1)
- Sweden (2)
- Great Britain (2)
- Yugoslavia (1)
