= Jaime Itlman =

Chilean sprinter (1924–2005)

Personal information
- Full name: Jaime Itlman Reitich
- Born: 14 July 1924 Santiago, Chile
- Died: 19 November 2005 (aged 81) Buenos Aires, Argentina

Sport
- Sport: Sprinting
- Event: 400 metres

Jaime Itlman Reitich (14 July 1924 – 19 November 2005) was a Chilean sprinter. He competed in the men's 400 metres at the 1948 Summer Olympics.

== International competitions ==
Year	Competition	Venue	Position	Event	Notes
Representing Chile
1947	South American Championships	Rio de Janeiro, Brazil	6th (h)	200 m	22.6
1947	South American Championships	Rio de Janeiro, Brazil	2nd	4 × 400 m relay	3:17.0
1948	Olympic Games	London, United Kingdom	29th (h)	800 m	1:56.6
1948	Olympic Games	London, United Kingdom	11th (h)	4 × 400 m relay	3:23.8
1951	Pan American Games	Buenos Aires, Argentina	7th (sf)	400 m	49.5
1951	Pan American Games	Buenos Aires, Argentina	2nd	4 × 400 m relay	3:17.7

== Personal bests ==
- 400 metres – 48.7h (1947)
