= Athletics at the 1951 Pan American Games – Men's 400 metres =

Men's 400 metres at the Pan American Games

The men's 400 metres event at the 1951 Pan American Games was held at the Estadio Monumental in Buenos Aires on 3 and 4 March.

== Medalists ==
| Gold | Silver | Bronze |
|---|---|---|
| Mal Whitfield; United States | Hugo Maiocco; United States | Herb McKenley; Jamaica |

== Results ==
=== Heats ===
Held on 3 March

| Rank | Heat | Name | Nationality | Time | Notes |
|---|---|---|---|---|---|
| 1 | 1 | John Voight | United States | 50.6 | Q |
| 2 | 1 | Angel García | Cuba | 50.6 | Q |
| 3 | 1 | Ramón Sandoval | Chile | 50.7 | Q |
| 4 | 1 | Carlos Camargo | Mexico | 51.2 | |
| 5 | 1 | Anastasio Zelaya | Paraguay | 51.5 | |
| 6 | 1 | Luis Modeste | Trinidad and Tobago | ??.? | |
| 1 | 2 | Guillermo Evans | Argentina | 57.3 | Q |
| 2 | 2 | Gustavo Ehlers | Chile | 57.4 | Q |
| 3 | 2 | Carlos Monges | Mexico | 1:04.9 | Q |
| | 2 | Argemiro Roque | Brazil | DNS | |
| | 2 | Evelio Planas | Cuba | DNS | |
| 1 | 3 | Herb McKenley | Jamaica | 49.0 | Q |
| 2 | 3 | Hugo Maiocco | United States | 50.0 | Q |
| 3 | 3 | Guido Veronese | Argentina | 50.2 | Q |
| 4 | 3 | José Zelaya | Paraguay | 50.5 | |
| 5 | 3 | Javier Souza | Mexico | 50.6 | |
| 1 | 4 | Mal Whitfield | United States | 49.2 | Q |
| 2 | 4 | Jaime Hitelman | Chile | 50.6 | Q |
| 3 | 4 | Máximo Guerra | Argentina | 50.6 | Q |
| 4 | 4 | Guillermo Gutiérrez | Venezuela | 51.2 | |
| | 4 | Jacinto González | Ecuador | DNS | |

=== Semifinals ===
Held on 3 March

| Rank | Heat | Name | Nationality | Time | Notes |
|---|---|---|---|---|---|
| 1 | 1 | Angel García | Cuba | 48.5 | Q |
| 2 | 1 | John Voight | United States | 48.9 | Q |
| 3 | 1 | Gustavo Ehlers | Chile | 48.9 | Q |
| 4 | 1 | Carlos Monges | Mexico | 49.8 | |
| 5 | 1 | Guillermo Evans | Argentina | 50.8 | |
| 6 | 1 | Ramón Sandoval | Chile | ??.? | |
| 1 | 2 | Mal Whitfield | United States | 48.1 | Q |
| 2 | 2 | Herb McKenley | Jamaica | 48.9 | Q |
| 3 | 2 | Hugo Maiocco | United States | 49.0 | Q |
| 4 | 2 | Jaime Hitelman | Chile | 49.5 | |
| 5 | 2 | Guido Veronese | Argentina | 49.7 | |
| 6 | 2 | Máximo Guerra | Argentina | ??.? | |

=== Final ===
Held on 4 March

| Rank | Name | Nationality | Time | Notes |
|---|---|---|---|---|
| 1st place, gold medalist(s) | Mal Whitfield | United States | 47.8 | |
| 2nd place, silver medalist(s) | Hugo Maiocco | United States | 48.0 | |
| 3rd place, bronze medalist(s) | Herb McKenley | Jamaica | 48.2 | |
| 4 | John Voight | United States | 48.3 | |
| 5 | Angel García | Cuba | 48.4 | |
| 6 | Gustavo Ehlers | Chile | 49.4 | |
