= Marcel Hansenne =

French middle-distance runner

Medal record

Men's athletics

Representing France

Olympic Games
Bronze medal – third place	1948 London	800 m

European Championships
Silver medal – second place	1950 Brussels	800 m
Bronze medal – third place	1946 Oslo	800 m

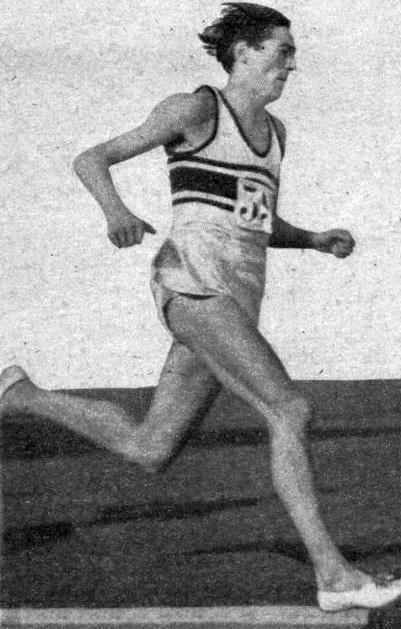
Marcel Hansenne en 1945

Marcel Hansenne (January 24, 1917 – March 22, 2002) was a French middle-distance runner, who won the bronze medal at the 1948 Summer Olympics in London over 800 m in a time of 1:49.8 min. The race was won by Mal Whitfield. Hansenne also equalled Rune Gustafsson's 1000 m world record of 2:21.4 in Gothenburg in 1948. Hansenne was born in Tourcoing.
