= Adan Torres =

Argentinian runner

Adán Torres
Personal information
- Nationality: Argentine
- Born: 11 September 1923

Sport
- Sport: Middle-distance running
- Event: 800 metres
Medal record
Men's athletics
Representing Argentina
South American Championships
Gold medal – first place	1947 Rio de Janeiro	800 m
Silver medal – second place	1952 Buenos Aires	4 × 400 m relay

Adán Mario Torres (born September 11, 1923, date of death unknown) was an Argentine runner. He competed in the men's 800 metres at the 1948 Summer Olympics.

In 1947, Torres set an Argentinian record of 1:53.7 to win the 800 m gold medal at the 1947 South American Championships in Athletics. His record was broken by Julio Ferreyra, who ran 1:53.6 at the 1951 Pan American 800 m. Torres won a silver medal in the 4 × 400 m at the 1952 South American Championships in Athletics.

At an unknown date before 1959, Torres committed suicide upon becoming disabled after being struck by a truck.

== International competitions ==
Year	Competition	Venue	Position	Event	Notes
Representing Argentina
1947	South American Championships	Rio de Janeiro, Brazil	1st	800 m	1:53.7
1948	Olympic Games	London, United Kingdom	30th (h)	800 m	1:56.7
1952	South American Championships	Buenos Aires, Argentina	2nd	4 × 400 m relay	3:18.0
1953	South American Championships (unofficial)	Santiago, Chile	–	800 m	NT

== Personal bests ==
- 800 metres – 1:53.7h (Rio de Janeiro 1947)
