= Brys =

Brys is a surname. Notable people with the surname include:

- Godelieve Brys (born 1937), Belgian gymnast
- Joseph Brys (1927–2001), Belgian middle-distance runner
- Marc Brys (born 1962), Belgian football manager and player
- Tim Brys (born 1992), Belgian rower
