= Georgy Ivakin =

Soviet middle-distance runner

Personal information
- Nationality: Soviet
- Born: 25 August 1928 Tashelan, Buryat ASSR
- Died: 1991 (aged 62–63)

Sport
- Sport: Middle-distance running
- Event: 800 metres

Georgy Ivakin (25 August 1928 – 1991) was a Soviet middle-distance runner. He competed in the men's 800 metres at the 1952 Summer Olympics.
