= Bob Chambers (runner) =

American track and field athlete (1926–2010)

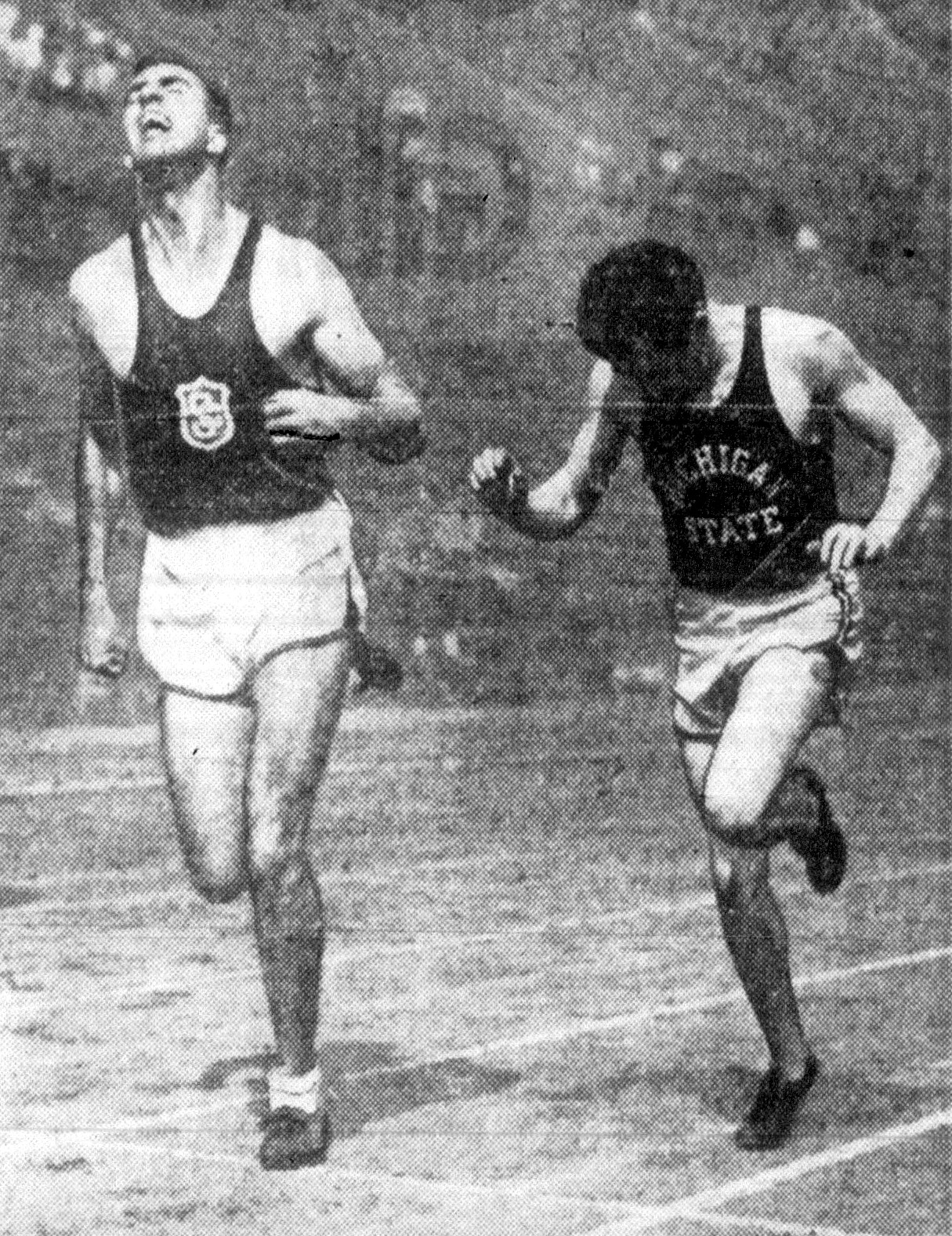
Chambers (left) and Michigan State Spartans sprinter Jack Dianette at a track meet on April 16, 1949 in Los Angeles, California.

Robert David Chambers (November 16, 1926, in Santa Clara County, California – November 6, 2010, in San Pedro, California) was an American track and field athlete known for running the half mile and 800 meters. Representing the US, Chambers finished sixth at the 1948 Olympics.

While running for Los Gatos High School, Chambers ran the second fastest 880 in history (to that point in time) 1:54.4. He was unable to run in the CIF California State Meet because it was cancelled during World War II. Following his stint in the U.S. Navy for the war, he entered the University of Southern California in 1946. As a sophomore in 1948, he finished third in the 800 meters at the 1948 NCAA Track and Field Championships. A few weeks later he also finished third at the 1948 Olympic Trials. In the Olympic final, his two American teammates again finished ahead of him, led by gold medalist Mal Whitfield, who had also beaten him at the NCAA and Olympic Trials.

After the Olympics Chambers, returned to USC leading the team to back to back NCAA Championships in 1949 and 1950, as team captain his senior year.

He went on to be the track coach at Los Angeles Pierce College. While at Pierce, Chambers invented a lane seeding formula for the Southern California Championships. It was adopted into the rules in 1970. The NCAA adopted the scheme a year later and by 1972 it became the standard by which the Olympics and other global competitions use for lane seeding.

In 1954 he joined the Los Angeles County Lifeguards and remained a lifeguard for 34 years until 1988.

He is a member of the Los Gatos High School Hall of Fame.
