= Dhanoa =

Disambiguation page for an Indian surname

- Pronunciation: /d̪ʱəˈnoːaː/

Origin
- Language: Punjabi
- Origin: Derived from the Punjabi word 'dhan' (ਧਨ)
- Meaning: Those who are blessed
- Region of origin: Punjab

Other names
- Alternative spelling: Dhanwa, Danoa

Dhanoa is a Punjab and Uttar Pradesh originated Indian surname found among Jats and Sikhs with the widely accepted translation to those who are blessed (dhan meaning 'blessed' and oa meaning 'those').

== Distribution ==
People bearing the surname Dhanoa were found in India, Canada, United States, Italy, United Arab Emirates and United Kingdom, Primarily in India and Canada.

=== Canada ===
The people bearing the surname in Canada primarily migrated from India to Canada from the 1830s to the 1940s. Approximately 225,000 Canadians bear the surname, which is 0.55% of the total population.

Notable people with the surname include:

- Birender Singh Dhanoa, Indian Air Force officer
- Dan Dhanoa (born 1959), Indian actor, model and sailor
- Guddu Dhanoa, Indian writer, producer and director
- Sohan Singh Dhanoa (born 1930), Indian Olympic middle-distance runner
