= Luthy =

Luthy or Lüthy is a surname. Notable people with the surname include:

- Herbert Lüthy (1918–2002), Swiss historian and journalist
- Jacques Lüthy (born 1959), Swiss former alpine skier
- Oskar Lüthy (1882–1945), Swiss painter

== See also ==
- Lüthi, a surname
