= Herb Barten =

American middle-distance runner (born 1928)

Personal information
- Born: January 13, 1928 (age 98)
- Height: 5 ft 10 in (178 cm)
- Weight: 141 lb (64 kg)

Sport
- Country: United States
- Event: 800 m
- College team: Michigan Wolverines

Achievements and titles
- Personal best(s): 800 m: 1:50.1 880 yds: 1:49.8 1 Mile: 4:14.6

Herb Barten (born January 13, 1928) is an American former middle distance runner who competed in the 1948 Summer Olympics, where he placed fourth with a time of 1:50.1 in the 800 meter. Barten was the AAU 800 meter champion in 1948 and placed second the following year. Barten attended the University of Michigan from 1946 to 1949, where he claimed five individual Big Ten titles. In 2007, he was inducted into the Michigan Men's Track and Field hall of fame. As of 2016, Barten resides in Clemson, South Carolina where he "enjoys watching the youngsters compete [in the Olympics] every four years."

== 1948 London Olympics ==
=== Round 1 ===
The first four in each heat qualified for the Semi-finals.

==== Heat 2 ====
Rank	Country	Athletes	Time (hand)
1	United States	Herb Barten	1:55.6

=== Semifinals ===
==== Heat 3 ====
Rank	Country	Athletes	Time (hand)
1	United States	Herb Barten	1:51.7

=== Finals ===
Rank	Name	Nationality	Time (hand)
1st place, gold medalist(s)	Mal Whitfield	United States	1:49.2
2nd place, silver medalist(s)	Arthur Wint	Jamaica	1:49.5
3rd place, bronze medalist(s)	Marcel Hansenne	France	1:49.8
4	Herb Barten	United States	1:50.1
