= Johannes Baumgartner =

Swiss middle-distance runner (1927–2021)

Personal information
- Nationality: Swiss
- Born: 14 October 1927
- Died: 23 June 2021 (aged 93)

Sport
- Sport: Middle-distance running
- Event: 800 metres

Johannes Baumgartner (14 October 1927 – 23 June 2021) was a Swiss middle-distance runner. He competed in the men's 800 metres at the 1952 Summer Olympics.
