= Juan Adarraga =

Spanish middle-distance runner

Personal information
- Nationality: Spanish
- Born: 24 June 1924 Hernani, Guipúzcoa, Spain
- Died: 21 September 1996 (aged 72) Madrid, Spain

Sport
- Sport: Middle-distance running
- Event: 800 metres

Juan Bautista Adarraga Elizarán (24 June 1924 – 21 September 1996) was a Spanish middle-distance runner. He competed in the men's 800 metres at the 1948 Summer Olympics.
