= Gaston Mayordomo =

French middle-distance runner

Personal information
- Nationality: French
- Born: 16 January 1923
- Died: 23 July 2005 (aged 82)

Sport
- Sport: Middle-distance running
- Event: 800 metres

Gaston Mayordomo (16 January 1923 – 23 July 2005) was a French middle-distance runner. He competed in the men's 800 metres at the 1948 Summer Olympics.
