= Louis Desmet =

Belgian middle-distance runner (1930–2001)

Personal information
- Nationality: Belgian
- Born: 5 January 1930 Sint-Pieters-Leeuw, Belgium
- Died: 6 June 2001 (aged 71) Anderlecht, Belgium

Sport
- Sport: Middle-distance running
- Event: 800 metres

Louis Desmet (5 January 1930 – 6 June 2001) was a Belgian middle-distance runner. He competed in the men's 800 metres at the 1952 Summer Olympics. Desmet died in Anderlecht on 6 June 2001, at the age of 71.
