= Østerbro Stadium =

Stadium in Copenhagen, Denmark

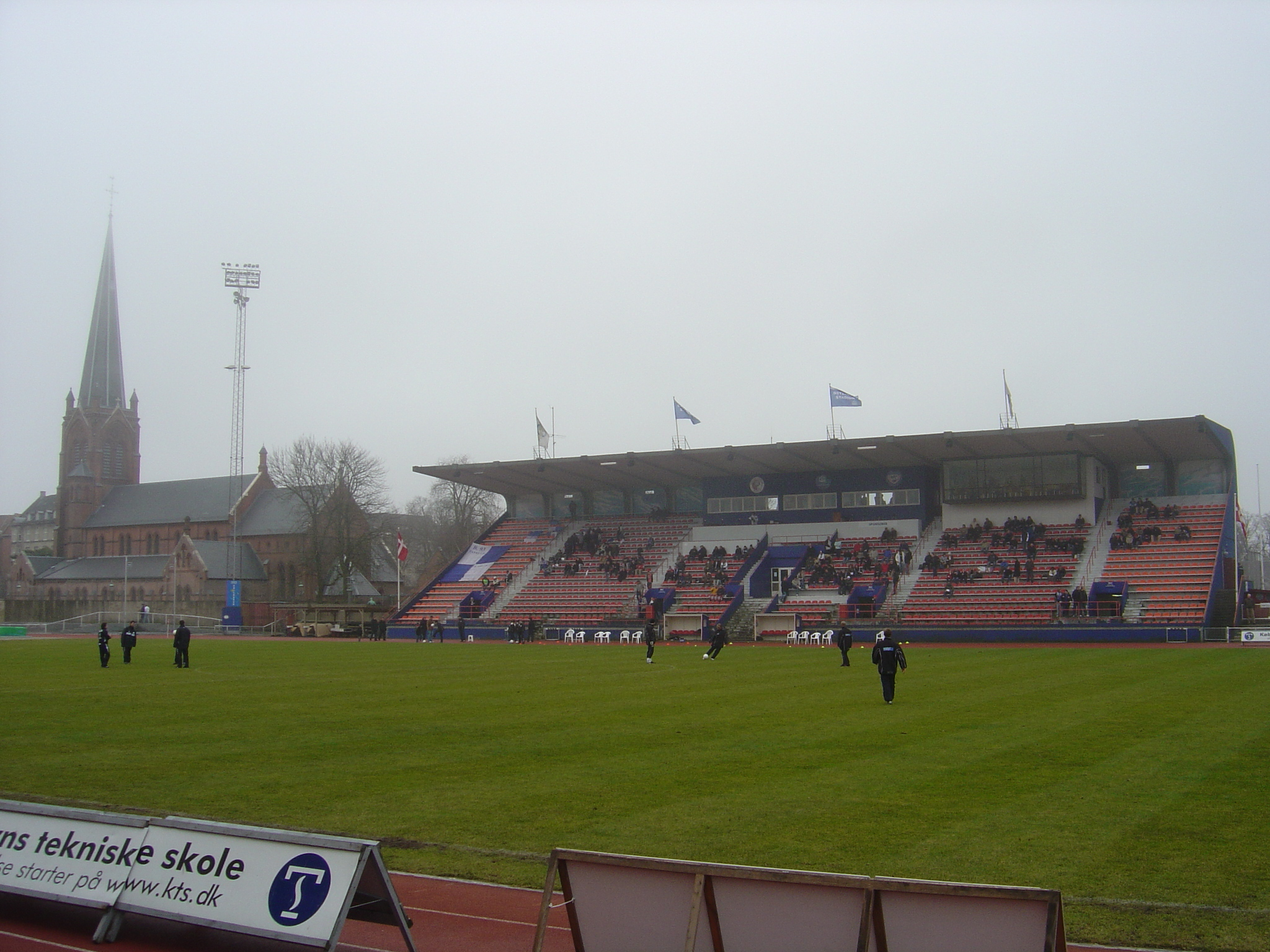
- The main stand
- Interactive map of Østerbro Stadium
- Address: Gunnar Nu Hansens Plads 7 Copenhagen; Denmark; 2100
- Location: Østerbro
- Coordinates: 55.7041°N 12.5749°E
- Owner: Copenhagen Municipality
- Capacity: 3,800

Construction
- Opened: 1912; 114 years ago

Tenants
- Boldklubben af 1893; B.93 W BK Skjold; Københavns Idræts Forening; Sparta

Website
- kulturogfritidoe.kk.dk/huse/idraetshuset-og-oesterbro-stadion

Østerbro Stadium is a combined football and athletics stadium in Copenhagen, Denmark. It is the home of the football clubs Boldklubben af 1893 and BK Skjold and it is also the home stadium of the athletics clubs Københavns Idræts Forening and Sparta. It has a capacity of approximately 3,800. The stadium was used for the 2009 World Outgames.

== History ==
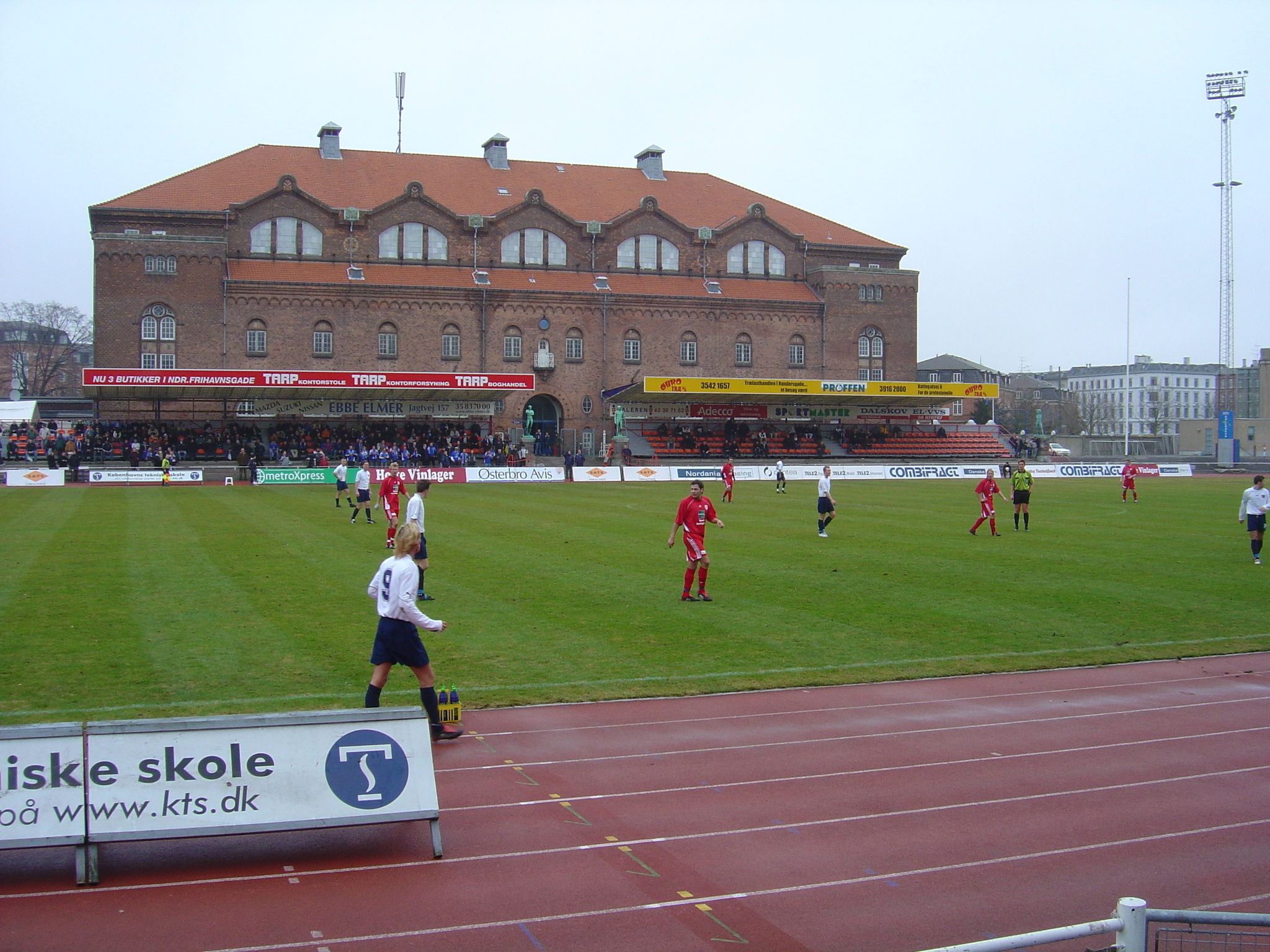
Idrætshuset and the secondary stand.

Østerbro Stadium was opened as an athletics stadium in 1912. The entrance was topped with bronze statues depicting sporting activities. The stadium is open as an ice skating venue in the winter. Østerbro Stadium is located next to F.C. Copenhagen's Parken Stadium. At a distance of 0.13 miles (0.21 km), it is recognised as the second closest stadium pairings in the world behind Paris Saint-Germain's Parc des Princes and Paris FC's Stade Jean-Bouin in France. During the Nazi occupation of Denmark, Østerbro Stadium was used as the location for a number of collaborationist athletics meetings with German athletes. An unofficial international association football match between the Denmark national football team and the Hungary national football team was also hosted there in 1941.

In 1952, as part of the 1952 Summer Olympics torch relay, Østerbro Stadium hosted an Olympic festival of athletics. The event was opened by Prince Knud with the Olympic flag flown and the Olympic torch being lit at the stadium before the relay continued onto Helsinki in Finland. The festival also featured the Gold Coast and Nigerian athletes competing for the first time under floodlights. In 1998, it was suggested that Brøndby IF would play their home matches at Østerbro Stadium while their Brøndby Stadium was being renovated and due to poor attendances at their home matches hosted at Parken Stadium. However, this suggestion was denied. The stadium has also hosted fashion shows, using the running track as a runway.
