= Frank Evans (athlete) =

British middle-distance runner

Personal information
- Nationality: British (English)
- Born: 7 April 1925 Manchester, England
- Died: 24 July 1996 (aged 71) Carrara, Queensland, Australia
- Height: 169 cm (5 ft 7 in)
- Weight: 59 kg (130 lb)

Sport
- Sport: Athletics
- Event: Middle-distance running
- Club: Manchester AU; Onehunga Harriers

Frank Evans (7 April 1925 – 24 July 1996) was a British middle-distance runner who competed at the 1952 Summer Olympics.

== Biography ==
Evans was born in Manchester, England and began running in Bermuda, when he was serving with the British Navy.

On 26 September 1951, he was a member of the English relay team that consisted of Bill Nankeville, Albert Webster and John Parlett that broke the 4 × 800 metres world record. The quartet recorded 7:30.6 at the White City Stadium.

Evans finished second behind Arthur Wint in the 880 yards event at the 1951 AAA Championships but by virtue of being the highest placed Briton was considered the British 880 yards champion.

Evans finished third behind Roger Bannister at the 1952 AAA Championships. Shortly afterwards, he represented the Great Britain team at the 1952 Olympic Games in Helsinki in the men's 800 metres.

He emigrated to New Zealand in 1957 and joined Onehunga Harriers. He then worked in the United States and finally moved to Australia via New Zealand again. He ran in the World Masters Athletics Championships representing Australia.
