= Hugo Maiocco =

American sprinter

Hugh Maiocco
Personal information
- Full name: Hugo Vincenzo Nicola Maiocco
- Born: April 5, 1927
- Died: August 9, 2017 (aged 90)
Medal record
Men's athletics
Representing the United States
Pan American Games
| Gold medal – first place | 1951 Buenos Aires | 4 × 400 m relay |
| Silver medal – second place | 1951 Buenos Aires | 400 m |
| Bronze medal – third place | 1951 Buenos Aires | 800 m |

Hugo Vincenzo Nicola Maiocco (April 5, 1927 – August 9, 2017) was an American sprinter who competed in the 1951 Pan American Games. He was a member of the American relay team which won the gold medal in the 4×400 metres event. He won the silver medal in the 400 metre competition and the bronze medal in the 800 metre competition.

Maiocco competed for the NYU Violets track and field team in the NCAA.
