= Doug Harris (athlete) =

New Zealand runner (1919–1996)

Personal information
- Born: Douglas Mostyn Harris; 15 June 1919 Auckland, New Zealand
- Died: 17 June 1996 (aged 77)
- Height: 182 cm (6 ft 0 in)
- Weight: 76 kg (168 lb)

Sport
- Country: New Zealand
- Sport: Athletics
- Event: 400m/800m
- Club: West Coast (North Island)

Achievements and titles
- National finals: 440 yards champion (1945, 1946, 1947); 880 yards champion (1946, 1947)

Douglas Mostyn Harris (15 June 1919 – 17 June 1996) was a New Zealand runner who competed at the 1948 Summer Olympics.

== Biography ==
Harris finished second behind John Parlett in the 880 yards event at the British 1948 AAA Championships. Shortly after the AAAs, Harris represented New Zealand at the 1948 London Olympics, competing in the 800 metres event.

Harris competed in the 880 yards event at the 1950 British Empire Games.

Harris won five New Zealand national athletics titles: the 440 yards in 1945, 1946, and 1947; and the 880 yards in 1946 and 1947.

Harris lived in Hāwera, South Taranaki, for much of his life. He died on 17 June 1996, and he was buried at Hāwera Cemetery.
