= Mohamed Sanni-Thomas =

Ghanaian middle-distance runner (1927–2007)

Personal information
- Nationality: Ghanaian
- Born: 11 August 1927
- Died: 3 February 2007 (aged 79)

Sport
- Sport: Middle-distance running
- Event: 800 metres

Mohamed Sanni-Thomas (11 August 1927 – 3 February 2007) was a Ghanaian middle-distance runner. He competed in the men's 800 metres at the 1952 Summer Olympics.
