= John Barnes (runner) =

American middle-distance runner (1929–2004)

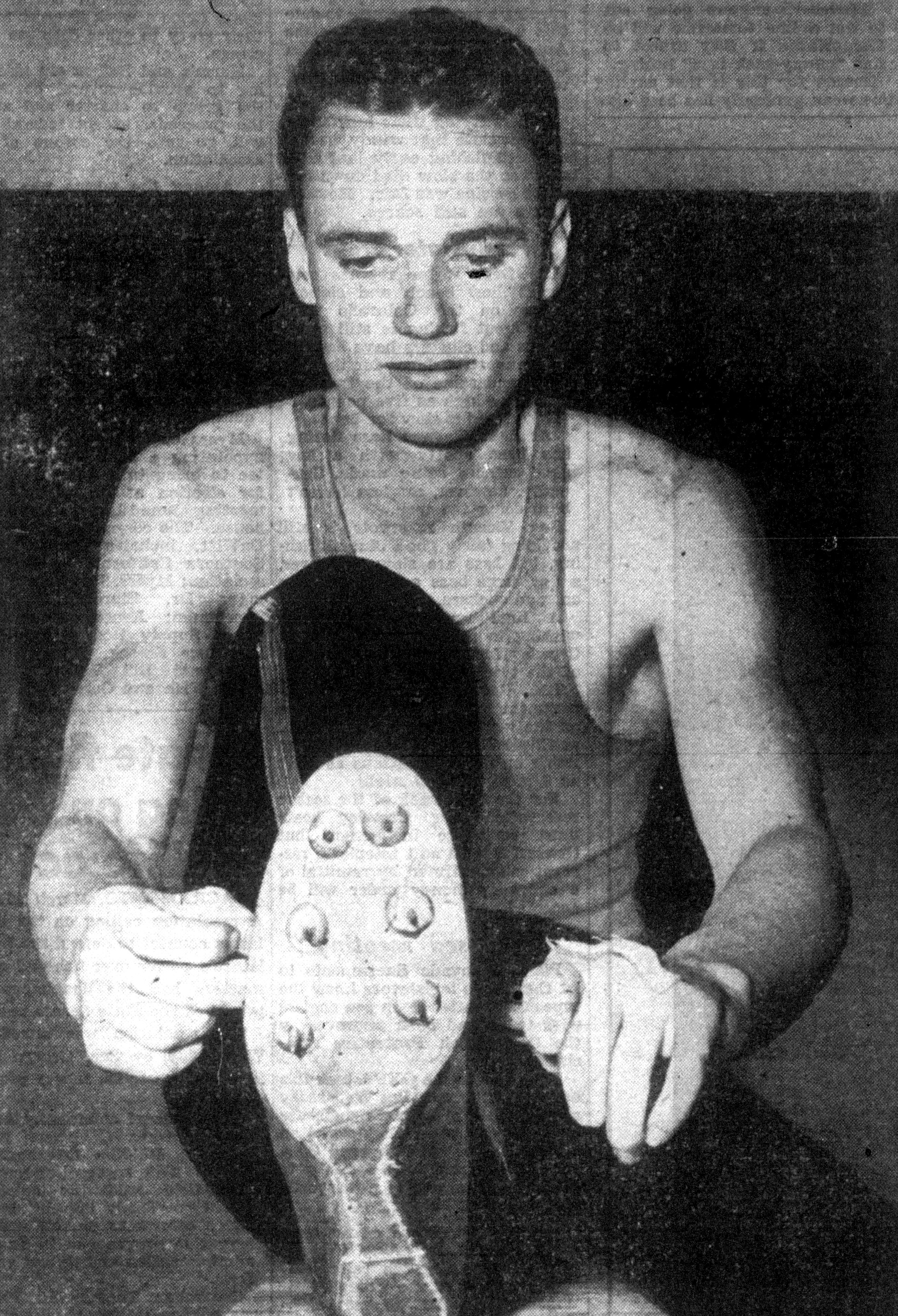
- Barnes, circa 1951

Personal information
- Nationality: American
- Born: October 12, 1929
- Died: August 25, 2004 (aged 74)

Sport
- Sport: Middle-distance running
- Event: 800 metres

John Barnes (October 12, 1929 – August 25, 2004) was an American middle-distance runner. He competed in the men's 800 metres at the 1952 Summer Olympics.

Running for the Occidental Tigers track and field team, Barnes won the 880 yards at the 1951 NCAA Track and Field Championships and the 800 meters at the 1952 NCAA Track and Field Championships.
