= Harry Tarraway =

British athlete (1925–2002)

Personal information
- Nationality: British
- Born: 22 April 1925 Southport, Lancashire, England
- Died: 21 April 2002 (aged 76) Poole, Dorset, England

Sport
- Sport: Middle-distance running
- Event: 800 metres

Harry Tarraway (22 April 1925 – 21 April 2002) was a British middle-distance runner. He competed in the men's 800 metres at the 1948 Summer Olympics.
