= Niels Holst-Sørensen =

Danish athlete and general (1922–2023)

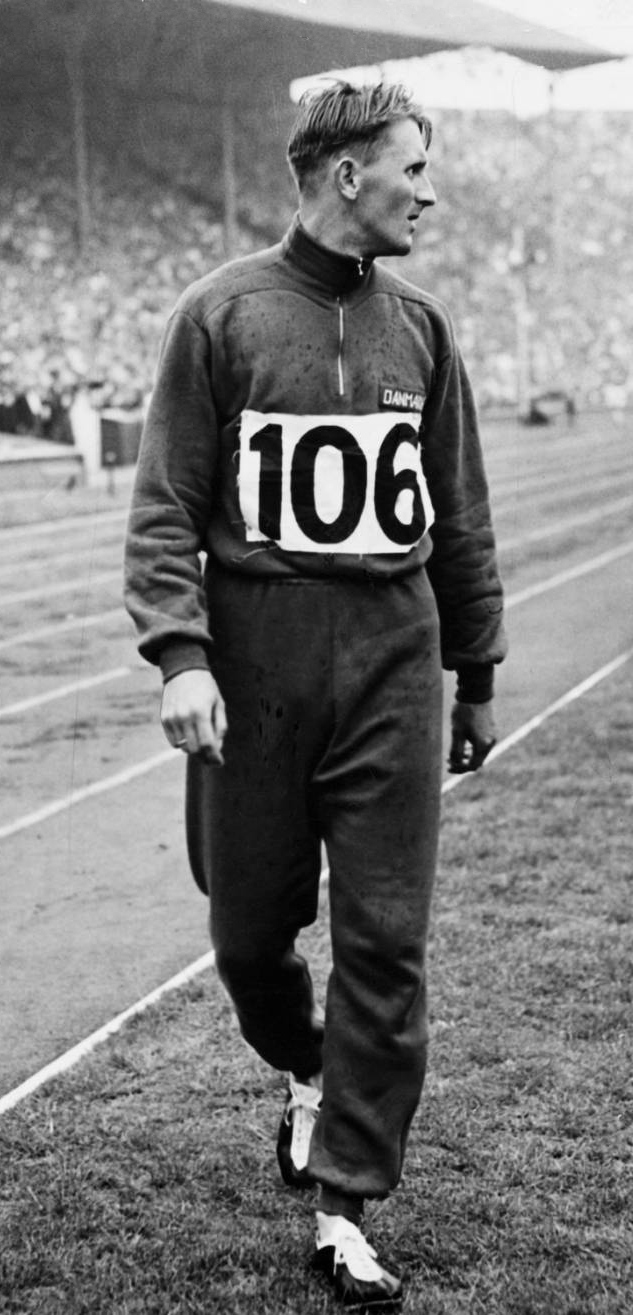
- Holst-Sørensen in 1946

Chief of the Royal Danish Air Force
- In office 1 January 1970 – 26 May 1982
- Preceded by: H. J. Pagh
- Succeeded by: P. Thorsen

Personal details
- Born: 19 December 1922 Sønder Felding, Herning, Denmark
- Died: 24 October 2023 (aged 100)
- Spouse: Hjørdis Christiansen (m. 1947)

Military service
- Allegiance: Denmark
- Branch/service: Royal Danish Army; Royal Danish Air Force
- Years of service: 1941–1987
- Rank: Major General
- Sports career
- Height: 178 cm (5 ft 10 in)
- Weight: 70 kg (154 lb)
- Sport: Athletics
- Event(s): 400 m, 800 m
- Club: Københavns Idræts Forening

Sports achievements and titles
- Personal best(s): 400 m – 47,6 (1944); 800 m – 1:48.9 (1943)
Medal record
Men's athletics
Representing Denmark
European Championships
Gold medal – first place	1946 Oslo	400 m
Silver medal – second place	1946 Oslo	800 m

Niels Holst-Sørensen (19 December 1922 – 24 October 2023) was a Danish athlete and air force officer, and a centenarian. He served as the commander-in-chief of the Royal Danish Air Force from 1970 to 1982, and as Denmark's military representative to NATO from 1982 to 1986. He won gold and silver medals at the 1946 European Athletics Championships and served as a member of the International Olympic Committee from 1977 to 2002.

== Athletic career ==
Holst-Sørensen's first major international meeting was the 1946 European Championships, which took place in Oslo. Holst-Sørensen won the gold medal in the 400 metres with a time of 47.9 seconds. He won a silver medal over 800 metres, finishing a tenth of a second behind the Swedish athlete Rune Gustafsson in a time of 1:51.1. He was also a member of the Danish team which finished fourth in the 4 × 400 metres relay in a time of 3:15.4.

Holst-Sørensen competed in the 800 metres at the 1948 Olympics in London. He qualified for the final as no. three in a semifinal in a time of 1:52.4, and finished the final in ninth place in a time of 1:54.0.

Holst-Sørensen won a total of ten Danish championships over 400 and 800 metres, winning both events every year from 1943 to 1947. In 1943 in Stockholm he won the 800 metres in an international match against Sweden in a time of 1:48.9, the fastest time recorded in the world that year. A few days later, coming home to Denmark, he was arrested. As a lieutenant of the Danish army he was interned for a period, because the Danish government had finally broken with the German occupation authorities, while Holst-Sørensen was competing in Stockholm. Holst-Sørensen began his career running for Herning GF, but switched to Københavns Idræts Forening in 1944.

Holst-Sørensen joined the International Olympic committee in 1977 and served as a member until 2002. He served on the IOC's coordination committees for the Winter Olympic Games in Albertville in 1992, Lillehammer in 1994, Nagano in 1998 and Salt Lake City in 2002. He was named as an honorary member of the IOC following his retirement in 2002. Holst-Sørensen also served as the president of the National Olympic Committee from 1981 to 1984.

== Military career ==
Holst-Sørensen was a graduate of the Royal Danish Army Officers Academy and was a serving Lieutenant in the Royal Danish Army during his athletic career. He was transferred to the Royal Danish Air Force at its foundation in 1950. He eventually rose to the rank of Major General and served as the commander-in-chief of the Air Force from 1970 to 1982 and Denmark's military representative to NATO from 1982 to 1986. He retired from the Air Force in 1987.

== Death ==
Niels Holst-Sørensen died on 24 October 2023, at the age of 100.
