= Hans Streuli (athlete) =

Swiss middle-distance runner

Personal information
- Nationality: Swiss
- Born: 1924
- Died: 18 February 2018 (aged 93–94)

Sport
- Sport: Middle-distance running
- Event: 800 metres

Hans Streuli (1924 – 18 February 2018) was a Swiss middle-distance runner. He competed in the men's 800 metres at the 1948 Summer Olympics.
