= Erkki Rönnholm =

Finnish middle-distance runner

Personal information
- Nationality: Finnish
- Born: 18 September 1923
- Died: 15 September 2010 (aged 86)

Sport
- Sport: Middle-distance running
- Event: 800 metres

Erkki Rönnholm (18 September 1923 – 15 September 2010) was a Finnish middle-distance runner. He competed in the men's 800 metres at the 1952 Summer Olympics.
