= Boonpak Kwancharoen =

Thai middle-distance runner (born 1928)

Personal information
- Nationality: Thai
- Born: 9 April 1928

Sport
- Sport: Middle-distance running
- Event: 800 metres

Boonpak Kwancharoen (Thai: บุญภักดิ์ ขวัญเจริญ; born 9 April 1928) is a Thai former Olympic runner, science teacher and author. He taught at the Demonstration School of Bansomdejchaopraya Rajabhat University, and wrote the 1970 book Nak Witthayasat Num (นักวิทยาศาสตร์หนุ่ม 'young scientists'), which was included on the list of 88 recommended Thai science books sponsored by the Thailand Research Fund in 2001. As a middle-distance runner, he competed in the men's 800 metres at the 1952 Summer Olympics.
