= Rashid Khadr =

Egyptian middle-distance runner (born 1928)

Personal information
- Full name: Rashad Muhammad Khadr
- Nationality: Egyptian
- Born: 1928 Cairo, Egypt

Sport
- Sport: Middle-distance running
- Event: 800 metres

Rashid Khadr (born 1928) was an Egyptian middle-distance runner. He competed in the men's 800 metres at the 1948 Summer Olympics.
