= Bill Brown (runner) =

American athlete (1925–2018)

Personal information
- Full name: William Brown
- Born: April 28, 1925
- Died: April 25, 2018 (aged 92)
Medal record
Men's athletics
Representing the United States
Pan American Games
Gold medal – first place	1951 Buenos Aires	4 × 400 m relay
Silver medal – second place	1951 Buenos Aires	800 m

William Brown (April 28, 1925 – April 25, 2018) was an American athlete who competed in the 1951 Pan American Games. He was a member of the American relay team which won the gold medal in the 4×400 metres event. In the 800 metre competition he won the silver medal. Brown had a career as an educator and coach at Bel Air High School in Bel Air, Maryland. He was inducted in the Maryland State Athletic Hall of Fame in 1976. He died on April 25, 2018, at the age of 92.

Competing for the Morgan State Bears track and field team, Brown won the 1950 NCAA Track and Field Championships in the 880 yards.
