= Hans Ring =

Swedish middle-distance runner

Personal information
- Nationality: Swedish
- Born: 19 June 1928
- Died: 9 April 2015 (aged 86)

Sport
- Sport: Middle-distance running
- Event: 800 metres

Hans Ring (19 June 1928 – 9 April 2015) was a Swedish middle-distance runner. He competed in the men's 800 metres at the 1952 Summer Olympics.
