= Alam Zeb (athlete) =

Pakistani middle-distance runner

Personal information
- Nationality: Pakistani
- Born: 10 August 1930

Sport
- Sport: Middle-distance running
- Event: 800 metres

Alam Zeb (born 10 August 1930) is a Pakistani former middle-distance runner. He competed in the men's 800 metres at the 1952 Summer Olympics.
