= Frits de Ruijter =

Dutch athlete

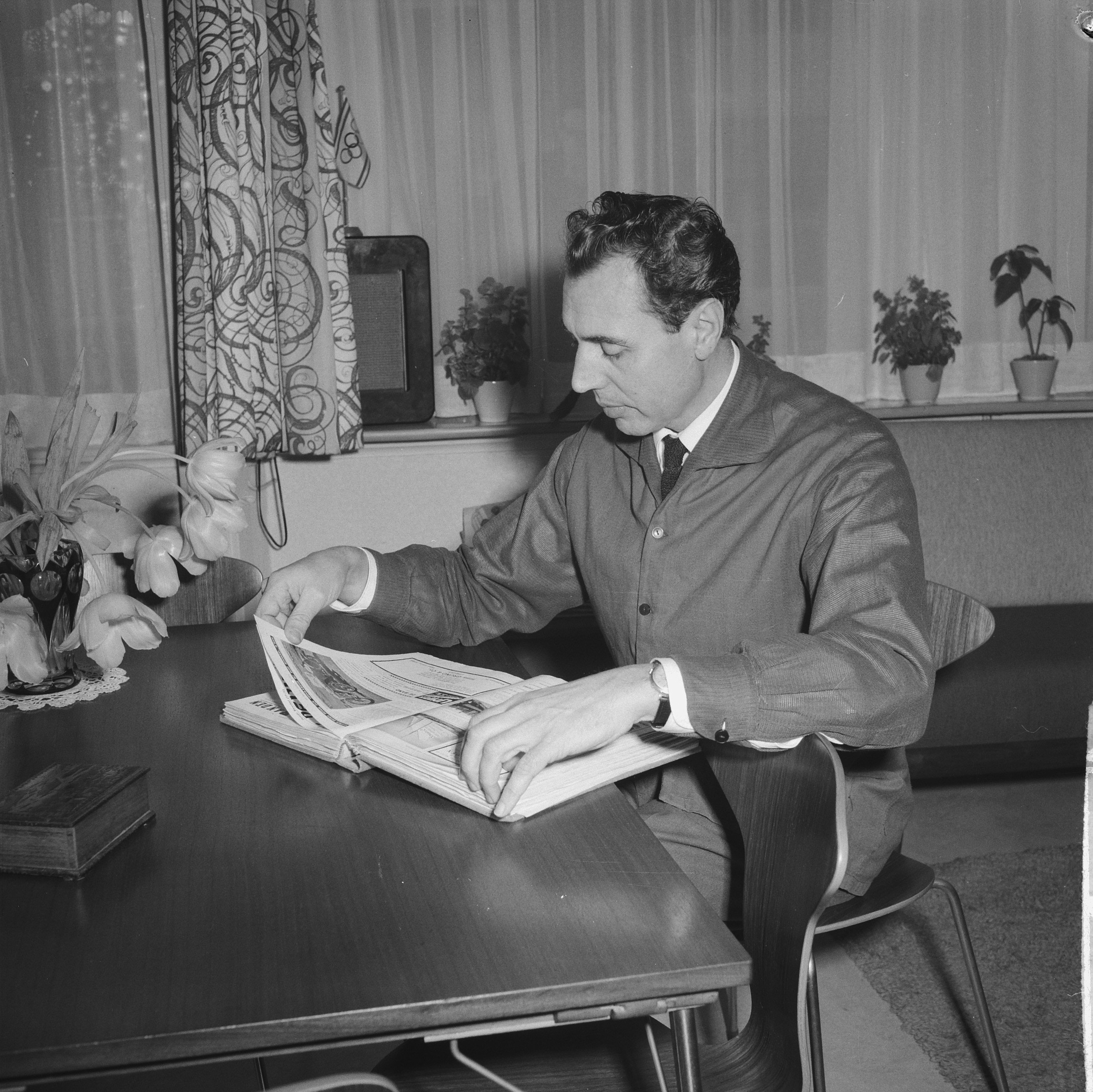
- Frits de Ruyter (1961)

Personal information
- Nationality: Dutch
- Born: 5 April 1917 Rotterdam, Netherlands
- Died: 20 March 2012 (aged 94) Heemstede, Netherlands

Sport
- Sport: Track and field
- Events: 800m, 1500m

Frits de Ruijter (5 April 1917 – 20 March 2012) was a Dutch middle-distance runner. He competed in the men's 800 metres and men's 1500 metres events at the 1948 Summer Olympics.

De Ruijter twice finished second at the British AAA Championships in the 1 mile event at the 1946 AAA Championships and the 880 yards event at the 1947 AAA Championships.

Awards
Preceded by Jef Lataster	KNAU Cup; 1948	Succeeded by Joop Overdijk
