= Herluf Christensen =

Danish middle-distance runner (1924–1970)

Personal information
- Nationality: Danish
- Born: Herluf Eigil Christensen; 16 September 1924 Vamdrup, Denmark
- Died: July 1970 (aged 45) Midland, Ontario, Canada

Sport
- Sport: Middle-distance running
- Event: 800 metres

Herluf Eigil Christensen (16 September 1924 – June 1970) was a Danish middle-distance runner. He competed in the men's 800 metres at the 1948 Summer Olympics. Christensen died in Midland, Ontario, Canada in June 1970, at the age of 45.
