= Gennady Modoy =

Personal information
- Nationality: Soviet
- Born: 28 December 1923 Rostov-na-Donu, Russian SFSR
- Died: 15 February 1994 (aged 70)

Sport
- Sport: Middle-distance running
- Event: 800 metres

Gennady Modoy (28 December 1923 – 15 February 1994) was a Soviet middle-distance runner. He competed in the men's 800 metres at the 1952 Summer Olympics.
