= Københavns Idræts Forening =

Danish athletics club

- Full name: Københavns Idræts Forening
- Founded: October 24, 1892
- Ground: Østerbro Stadion (stadium); Copenhagen

Københavns Idræts Forening (abbreviated Københavns IF, KIF) is a Danish athletics club based in the Østerbro district of Copenhagen.

The club is based at the Østerbro Stadium and the indoor Club Danmark Hallen in Valby. The club was founded in 1892 as Københavns Fodsports-Forening—the club adopted its current name in 1914—and is Denmark's oldest athletics club.

37 members of Københavns Idræts Forening have competed at the Olympic Games. Niels Holst-Sørensen, one of the club's athletes, won a gold medal in the 400 metres at the 1946 European Athletics Championships in Oslo. Gunnar Nielsen another of the club's athletes was 1955 world record holder at 1500 metres with 3.40.8. By the time of its centenary in 1992, the club's members had won a total of 575 gold medals at the Danish championships—the club is second only to Sparta in the number of Danish champions that it has produced.

== Famous athletes ==
- Christian Christensen
- Nick Ekelund-Arenander
- Vilhelm Gylche
- Mogens Guldberg
- Niels Holst-Sørensen
- Kai Jensen
- Valther Jensen
- Henrik Jørgensen
- Wilson Kipketer
- Gunnar Nielsen
- Henry Petersen
- Aage Rasmussen
- Eugen Schmidt
- Ernst Schultz
- August Sørensen
- Marinus Sørensen
