= Bill Ramsay (athlete) =

Australian athletics competitor

Personal information
- Nationality: Australian
- Born: John William Ramsay; 1 June 1928
- Died: 30 June 1988 (aged 60)

Sport
- Sport: Track & Field
- Event(s): 400 metres 800 metres
- Club: Geelong Guild Athletics Club

John William Ramsay (1 June 1928 – 30 June 1988) was an Australian athlete who competed in the 1948 Summer Olympics in the 400m and 800m.
