= Albert Webster (athlete) =

British middle-distance runner (1925–2010)

Personal information
- Nationality: British (English)
- Born: 25 May 1925 Leiston, Suffolk, England
- Died: 20 June 2010 (aged 85)
- Height: 175 cm (5 ft 9 in)
- Weight: 66 kg (146 lb)

Sport
- Sport: Athletics
- Event: Middle-distance running
- Club: Sutton-in-Ashfield Harriers

Albert Webster (25 May 1925 – 20 June 2010) was a British middle-distance runner who competed at the 1952 Summer Olympics.

== Biography ==
Webster was born in Leiston, Suffolk and grew up in Sutton-in-Ashfield.

On 26 September 1951 he set a world record as part of a 4 x 800 metres relay team, that consisted of Bill Nankeville, Frank Evans, and John Parlett. The quartet recorded 7:30.6 at the White City Stadium.

In 1952 Webster won the Midlands AAA 880 yard title and defeated Roger Bannister bu then finished second behind Roger Bannister in the 880 yards event at the 1952 AAA Championships. Shortly afterwards he represented the Great Britain team at the 1952 Olympic Games in Helsinki, where he competed in the men's 800 metres.

In the early 1960s, he was a coach at Bedford and County Athletic Club.
