= Bill Nankeville =

British middle-distance runner (1925–2021)

Personal information
- Nationality: British (English)
- Born: 24 March 1925 Guildford, England
- Died: 8 January 2021 (aged 95) Laleham, England
- Height: 177 cm (5 ft 10 in)
- Weight: 65 kg (143 lb)

Sport
- Sport: Athletics
- Event: middle-distance
- Club: Walton AC
Medal record
Men's athletics
Representing Great Britain
European Championships
Bronze medal – third place	1950 Brussels	1500 m

George William Nankeville (24 March 1925 – 8 January 2021) was a British middle distance athlete who won the AAA mile title four times in five years between 1948 and 1952 and ran a best recorded time of 4:08.8 in 1949. He was born in Guildford, Surrey.

== Biography ==
Nankeville was born on 24 March 1925 to a working-class background and his father was a milkman. Nankeville was a natural runner and early on didn't have any coaching but he still raced before joining an athletics club. In 1944, during World War II, he joined the army having made parachute containers and petrol tanks in Woking for three years prior. He served in Brussels, Belgium, Hamburg, Germany and took part in the liberation of Bergen-Belsen concentration camp.

Following the war, Nankeville won the first of four AAA Championships mile titles at the 1948 AAA Championships and he later represented Great Britain at the 1948 Summer Olympics in London, United Kingdom. He competed in the 1500 metres event and finished sixth. Two years later, he finished third in the 1500 metres event at the 1950 European Athletics Championships in Brussels.

On 26 September 1951 he set a world record as part of a 4 x 800 metres relay team, that consisted of Albert Webster, Frank Evans, and John Parlett. The quartet recorded 7:30.6 at the White City Stadium.

At the 1952 AAA Championships, Nankeville won another British AAA mile title at the White City Stadium in London in front of a crowd of 46,000 including Queen Elizabeth II. Nankeville, Don Seaman, Roger Bannister and Chris Chataway set a world record time of 16 minutes 41 seconds for the 4x1 mile on 1 August 1953, as well as the world record 15:27.2 for the 4x1500 metres on 23 September 1953 running with Ralph Dunkley, David Law and Gordon Pirie. Bannister ultimately broke the Four-minute mile barrier but Nankeville always got on well with him, continuing to speak until Bannister's death in 2018.

Alongside his athletic endeavours, Nankeville worked for a sports equipment manufacturer, as well as being a wholesaler and owner of three discount stores. Nankeville recorded the events leading to Roger Bannister's historic sub-four-minute mile in his book The Miracle of the Mile, published in 1956. He was married to Janet (d. 2010) for 63 years, and was the father of television impressionist Bobby Davro. He died in January 2021 at the age of 95.
