= Lee Yun-seok =

South Korean middle-distance runner (born 1924)

Personal information
- Nationality: South Korean
- Born: 1924

Sport
- Sport: Middle-distance running
- Event: 800 metres

Lee Yun-seok (born 1924) was a South Korean middle-distance runner. He competed in the men's 800 metres at the 1948 Summer Olympics.
