= Petro Chevhun =

Ukrainian middle-distance runner

Personal information
- Nationality: Ukrainian
- Born: 2 June 1926 Kyiv, Ukrainian SSR, Soviet Union
- Died: 4 June 1999 (aged 73)

Sport
- Sport: Middle-distance running
- Event: 800 metres

Petro Chevhun (2 June 1926 – 4 June 1999) was a Ukrainian middle-distance runner. He competed in the men's 800 metres at the 1952 Summer Olympics, representing the Soviet Union.
