= Václav Winter (athlete) =

Personal information
- Nationality: Czech
- Born: 7 September 1924
- Died: 20 March 2009 (aged 84)

Sport
- Sport: Middle-distance running
- Event: 800 metres

Václav Winter (7 September 1924 – 20 March 2009) was a Czech middle-distance runner. He competed in the men's 800 metres at the 1948 Summer Olympics.
