= Ludvík Liška =

Czech middle-distance runner (1929–2021)

Personal information
- Nationality: Czech
- Born: 8 April 1929 Lužná, Czechoslovakia
- Died: 19 February 2021 (aged 91) Brandýs nad Labem-Stará Boleslav, Czech Republic

Sport
- Sport: Middle-distance running
- Event: 800 metres

Ludvík Liška (8 April 1929 – 19 February 2021) was a Czech middle-distance runner. He competed for Czechoslovakia in the men's 800 metres at the 1952 Summer Olympics.
