= Eduardo Balducci =

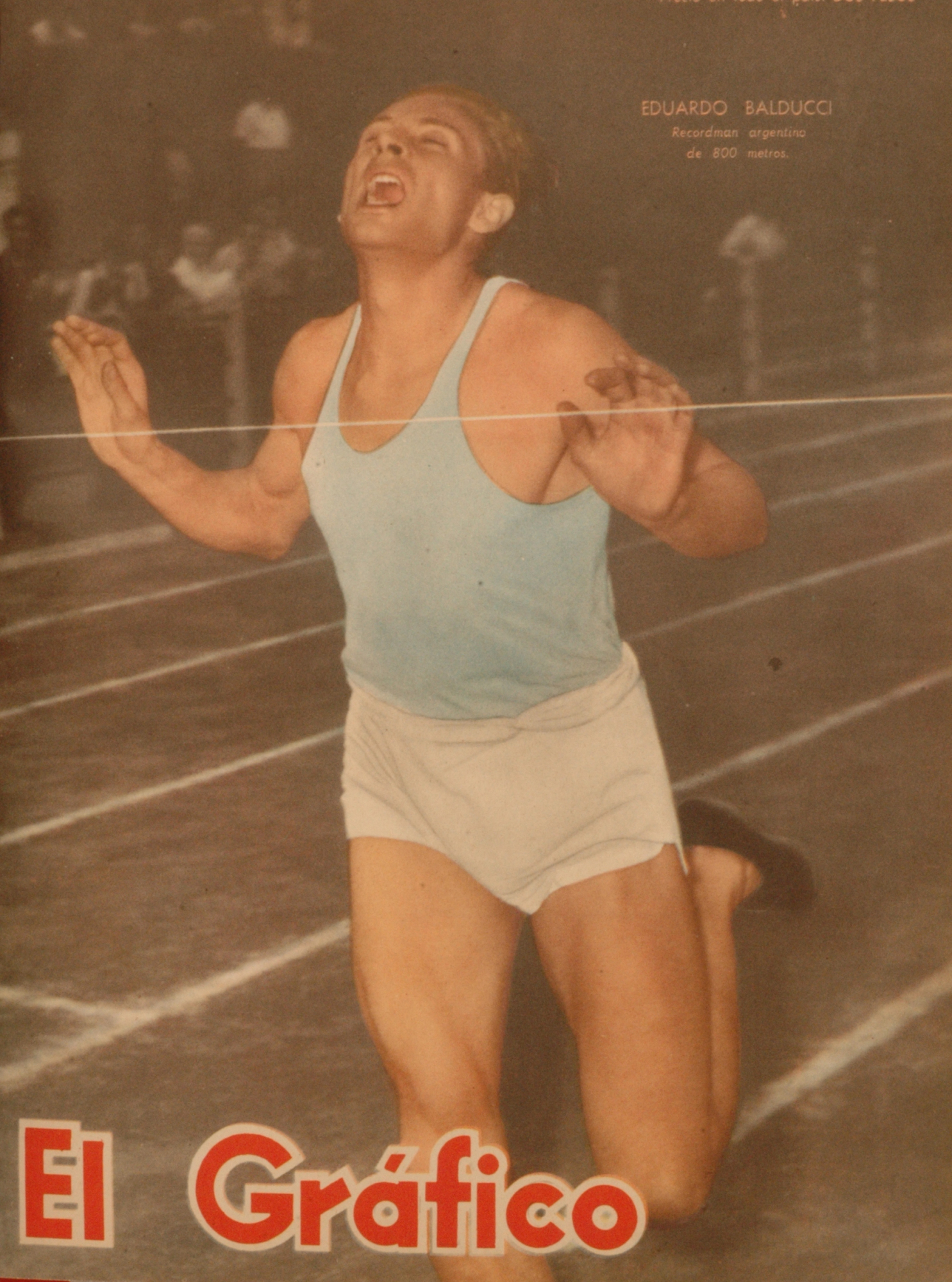
- Eduardo Balducci in 1956

Personal information
- Full name: Eduardo Luis Balducci
- Born: 15 April 1932 (age 94) Buenos Aires, Argentina

Sport
- Sport: Middle-distance running
- Events: 800 metres, 1500 metres
- Club: Club Argentino de Atletismo

Eduardo Luis Balducci (born 15 April 1932) is a retired Argentine middle-distance runner. He own several medals at regional level.

== International competitions ==
Year	Competition	Venue	Position	Event	Notes
Representing Argentina
1951	Pan American Games	Buenos Aires, Argentina	6th	800 m	1:54.7e
1951	Pan American Games	Buenos Aires, Argentina	3rd	4 × 400 m relay	3:18.4
1952	South American Championships	Buenos Aires, Argentina	5th (h)	400 m	50.3
1953	South American Championships (unofficial)	Santiago, Chile	–	1500 m	DQ
1956	South American Championships	Santiago, Chile	2nd	800 m	1:51.5
1956	South American Championships	Santiago, Chile	2nd	1500 m	3:53.4
1956	South American Championships	Santiago, Chile	3rd	4 × 400 m relay	3:16.8
1957	South American Championships (unofficial)	Santiago, Chile	4th	1500 m	3:59.2
1957	World Festival of Youth and Students	Moscow, Soviet Union	6th	800 m	1:52.0
1957	World Festival of Youth and Students	Moscow, Soviet Union	7th	1500 m	3:57.6
1958	South American Championships	Montevideo, Uruguay	2nd	800 m	1:51.3
1958	South American Championships	Montevideo, Uruguay	3rd	1500 m	3:51.3
1958	South American Championships	Montevideo, Uruguay	3rd	4 × 400 m relay	3:18.5
1961	South American Championships	Cali, Colombia	3rd	800 m	1:53.3
1961	South American Championships	Cali, Colombia	3rd	1500 m	3:53.6
1961	Ibero-American Games	Madrid, Spain	9th (h)	800 m	1:55.9
1961	Ibero-American Games	Madrid, Spain	7th	1500 m	4:01.6

== Personal bests ==
- 400 metres – 50.1h (Buenos Aires 1953)
- 800 metres – 1:50.2h (Buenos Aires 1956) former NR
- 1000 metres – 2:24.4h (Karlstadt 1957) former NR
- 1500 metres – 3:50.5h (Santiago 1956) former NR
- One mile – 4:15.6h (Villa Dominico 1960) former NR
- 3000 metres – 8:39.5h (Buenos Aires 1958)
- 5000 metres – 14:43.6h (Buenos Aires 1958)
