= Raymond Rosier =

Belgian middle-distance runner

Personal information
- Nationality: Belgian
- Born: 6 March 1924 Ixelles, Belgium
- Died: 8 April 1961 (aged 37) Brussels, Belgium

Sport
- Sport: Middle-distance running
- Event: 800 metres

Raymond Rosier (6 March 1924 – 8 April 1961) was a Belgian middle-distance runner. He competed in the men's 800 metres at the 1948 Summer Olympics.
