= Jenő Bakos =

Personal information
- Nationality: Hungarian
- Born: 5 May 1929
- Died: 5 February 1959 (aged 29)

Sport
- Sport: Middle-distance running
- Event: 800 metres

Jenő Bakos (5 May 1929 – 5 February 1959) was a Hungarian middle-distance runner. He competed in the men's 800 metres at the 1952 Summer Olympics.
