= Athletics at the 1951 Pan American Games – Men's 4 × 400 metres relay =

Men's 4 × 400 metres relay at the Pan American Games

The men's 4 × 400 metres relay event at the 1951 Pan American Games was held at the Estadio Monumental in Buenos Aires on 6 March.

== Results ==
Rank	Nation	Athletes	Time	Notes
1st place, gold medalist(s)	United States	Bill Brown, Mal Whitfield, John Voight, Hugo Maiocco	3:09.9	
2nd place, silver medalist(s)	Chile	Jaime Hitelman, Reinaldo Martín Muller, Gustavo Ehlers, Jörn Gevert	3:17.7	
3rd place, bronze medalist(s)	Argentina	Guido Veronese, Máximo Guerra, Julio Ferreyra, Eduardo Balducci	3:18.4	
4	Cuba	Angel García, Raúl Mazorra, Samuel Anderson, Evelio Planas	3:20.0	
5	Mexico	Javier Souza, Sergio Guiot, Carlos Camargo, Carlos Monges	?:??.?	
6	Paraguay	Fermín Villalba, Anastasio Zelaya, Rubén Figueredo, José Zelaya	?:??.?	
