= Cliff Simpson (sprinter) =

New Zealand middle-distance athlete

Personal information
- Born: Clifford Simpson; 20 August 1928 Temuka, New Zealand
- Died: 10 December 2023 (aged 95) Feilding, New Zealand

Sport
- Country: New Zealand
- Sport: Track and field
- Club: St Kilda Harrier and Amateur Athletic Club

Achievements and titles
- National finals: 880 yards champion (1950)

Clifford Simpson (20 August 1928 – 10 December 2023) was a New Zealand middle-distance athlete who represented his country at the 1950 British Empire Games. He also played representative rugby union for South Otago.

== Early life ==
Born in Temuka on 20 August 1928, Simpson was the son of George William and Winifred Margaret Simpson. He was educated at King's High School in Dunedin, where he played fullback in the school's 1st XV rugby team, and was prominent in athletics, winning the intermediate athletics championship in 1944.

== Athletics ==
Simpson came to national attention when he won the New Zealand under-19 880 yards title, representing Otago, in 1946, recording a time of 2:00.6, and was second in the same event the following year. He went on to win the national senior title over the same distance in 1950; his winning time was 1:54.4.

Simpson competed in the men's 880 yards and 1 mile at the 1950 British Empire Games in Auckland. He placed fourth in his heat of the 880 yards, and progressed to the final, in which he finished sixth in a time of 1:56.0. He ran 4:26.6 to finish sixth in his heat of the 1 mile, and did not advance further.

== Rugby union ==
A fullback, Simpson was a member of the Toko Rugby Football Club in Milton. He played for the South Otago representative rugby union team between at least 1947 and 1950.

== Later life ==
Simpson worked as a stock agent. He moved to the Manawatū in the early 1950s, living first in Feilding, and later at Halcombe. He died in Feilding on 10 December 2023.
