= Athletics at the 1951 Pan American Games – Men's 800 metres =

Men's 800 metres at the Pan American Games

The men's 800 metres event at the 1951 Pan American Games was held at the Estadio Monumental in Buenos Aires on 28 February and 1 March.

== Medalists ==
| Gold | Silver | Bronze |
|---|---|---|
| Mal Whitfield; United States | Bill Brown; United States | Hugo Maiocco; United States |

== Results ==
=== Heats ===
| Rank | Heat | Name | Nationality | Time | Notes |
|---|---|---|---|---|---|
| 1 | 1 | Mal Whitfield | United States | 1:57.7 | Q |
| 2 | 1 | Julio Ferreyra | Argentina | 1:57.8 | Q |
| 3 | 1 | Frank Prince | Panama | 1:58.1 | Q |
| 4 | 1 | Argemiro Roque | Brazil | 1:58.1 | Q |
| 5 | 1 | Hugo Maiocco | United States | ?:??.? | Q |
| 6 | 1 | Wilfred Tull | Trinidad and Tobago | ?:??.? | |
| 7 | 1 | Filemón Camacho | Venezuela | ?:??.? | |
| 8 | 1 | Rubén Figueredo | Paraguay | ?:??.? | |
| | 1 | Samuel Álvarez | Mexico | DNS | |
| 1 | 2 | Eduardo Balducci | Argentina | 1:57.2 | Q |
| 2 | 2 | Evelio Planas | Cuba | 1:58.2 | Q |
| 3 | 2 | Bill Brown | United States | 1:58.3 | Q |
| 4 | 2 | Luis Modeste | Trinidad and Tobago | 1:58.9 | Q |
| 5 | 2 | Adolfo Augustin | Argentina | ?:??.? | Q |
| 6 | 2 | Libardo Mora | Colombia | ?:??.? | |
| 7 | 2 | Luís Rodrigues | Brazil | ?:??.? | |
| 8 | 2 | Anastasio Zelaya | Paraguay | ?:??.? | |
| 9 | 2 | Rogelio Gómez | Peru | ?:??.? | |

=== Final ===
| Rank | Name | Nationality | Time | Notes |
|---|---|---|---|---|
| 1st place, gold medalist(s) | Mal Whitfield | United States | 1:53.2 | |
| 2nd place, silver medalist(s) | Bill Brown | United States | 1:53.3 | |
| 3rd place, bronze medalist(s) | Hugo Maiocco | United States | 1:53.6 | |
| 4 | Julio Ferreyra | Argentina | 1:53.6 | |
| 5 | Argemiro Roque | Brazil | 1:54.6e | |
| 6 | Eduardo Balducci | Argentina | 1:54.7e | |
| 7 | Adolfo Augustin | Argentina | 1:55.6e | |
| 8 | Evelio Planas | Cuba | 1:56.6e | |
| 9 | Luis Modeste | Trinidad and Tobago | ?:??.? | |
| 10 | Frank Prince | Panama | ?:??.? | |
