= Jacinto González =

Cuban basketball player

Personal information
- Born: 11 August 1941 (age 83); Las Villas, Cuba

Sport
- Sport: Basketball

Jacinto González (born 11 August 1941) is a Cuban basketball player. He competed in the men's tournament at the 1968 Summer Olympics.
