= Ezra Henniger =

Canadian middle-distance runner

Personal information
- Nationality: Canadian
- Born: 1 May 1927 Grand Forks, British Columbia, Canada
- Died: 22 January 1990 (aged 62) British Columbia Highway 3 near Grand Forks, British Columbia, Canada

Sport
- Sport: Middle-distance running
- Event: 800 metres

Ezra Churchill Henniger (1 May 1927 – 22 January 1990) was a Canadian middle-distance runner. He competed in the men's 800 metres at the 1948 Summer Olympics.

He was the son of Ezra Churchill Henniger, a politician and pioneer citizen of Grand Forks, British Columbia. In 1955, he married Lillian Gloria Harrison. He died in a single person motor vehicle accident in 1990.
