= Tashelan =

Tashelan Ташелан
- Selo
- Location within Republic of Buryatia Location within Russia
- Coordinates: 51°41′N 108°53′E
- Country: Russia
- Region: Republic of Buryatia
- District: Zaigrayevsky District
- Time zone: UTC+8:00

Tashelan (Russian: Ташелан; Buryat: Ташалан, Tashalan) is a rural locality (a selo) in Zaigrayevsky District, Republic of Buryatia, Russia. The population was 653 as of 2010. There are 7 streets.

== Geography ==
Tashelan is located 51 km southeast of Zaigrayevo (the district's administrative centre) by road. Mukhor-Tala is the nearest rural locality.
