= Fred Lüthi =

Swiss middle-distance runner

Personal information
- Nationality: Swiss
- Born: 7 March 1930 (age 96)

Sport
- Sport: Middle-distance running
- Event: 800 metres

Fred Lüthi (born 7 March 1930) is a Swiss middle-distance runner. He competed in the men's 800 metres at the 1952 Summer Olympics.
