= Olle Ljunggren =

Swedish middle-distance runner

Personal information
- Nationality: Swedish
- Born: 9 February 1921
- Died: 13 February 2003 (aged 82)

Sport
- Sport: Middle-distance running
- Event: 800 metres

Olle Ljunggren (9 February 1921 – 13 February 2003) was a Swedish middle-distance runner. He finished fourth in the men's 800 metres at the 1948 Summer Olympics.
