= Neil Wilson (athlete) =

New Zealand runner (1930–2023)

Personal information
- Born: Neil Thomas Osborne Wilson; 8 April 1930 Epsom, New Zealand
- Died: 14 August 2023 (aged 93) Motueka, New Zealand
- Spouse: Raewyn Joy Clark (d. 2014)

Sport
- Country: New Zealand
- Sport: Track and field

Achievements and titles
- National finals: 880 yards champion (1951)

Neil Thomas Osborne Wilson (8 April 1930 – 14 August 2023) was a New Zealand runner who represented his country at the 1950 British Empire Games.

== Early life and education ==
Wilson was born in the Auckland suburb of Epsom on 8 April 1930, the son of Lois Annabell Rona Wilson (née Knight) and Allan Baxter Wilson. He was educated at King's College, Auckland.

== Athletics ==
Wilson gained national attention as a junior, winning the national men's under-19 880 yards title in both 1948 and 1949, and the national men's under-19 1 mile title in 1949. He also won the national men's under-19 cross-country championship in 1948.

At the 1950 British Empire Games, Wilson competed in the men's 880 yards. He ran second in his heat, recording a personal-best time of 1:53.2, and advanced to the final, where he ran a time of 1:53.7 to finish in fourth place.

In 1951, Wilson won the New Zealand national men's 880 yards championship title in a time of 1:56.1.

== Personal life ==
Wilson married Raewyn Joy Clark in about 1955, and the couple went on to have two children. Wilson died in Motueka on 14 August 2023, at the age of 93, having been predeceased by his wife, Raewyn Wilson, in 2014.
