= Kurt Lüthi =

Swiss theologian (1923–2010)

- Born: 31 October 1923; Rohrbach BE, Switzerland
- Died: 11 June 2010 (aged 86); Vienna, Austria
- Notable work: Theology as dialogue with the world of today; Christian sexuality
- Title: Theologian; Author
- Theological work
- Tradition or movement: Ecumenism
- Notable ideas: Dialogue within Christianity, with Judaism, Psychoanalysis and Feminism

Kurt Lüthi (31 October 1923 – 11 June 2010) was a Swiss Reformed theologian and a professor at the University Vienna.

== Life ==
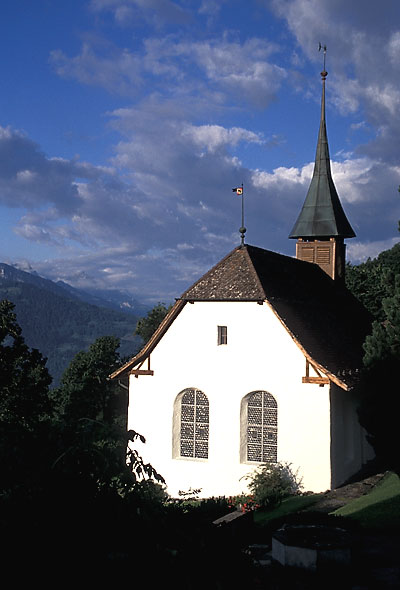
Church of Beatenberg

Lüthi studied Protestant theology in Bern and Basel, amongst his teachers were Karl Barth, Karl Ludwig Schmidt and Oscar Cullmann. In 1949 he became pastor at the Reformed church of the Canton of Bern, first in Beatenberg, later on in Biel. In 1955 he achieved his doctorate in theology at the University of Basel with a thesis on Judas Iscariot, in 1959 he habilitated at the University of Bern. From 1964 until his retirement 1990 Lüthi held the chair for systematic theology (Helvetic Confession) at the Protestant faculty of the University of Vienna. For many years Lüthi served as a member in the synod of the Helvetic Church in Austria, as well as in the general synod of all Lutheran Churches in Austria.

Lüthi's work focused on political philosophy, feminist theology and the relation between theology and psychoanalysis. In 1965, together with well respected theologians Wilhelm Dantine, Ferdinand Klostermann and Otto Mauer, he instigated the foundation of Austrias first Ecumenical Study Group. From 1967 to 1988 he was engaged in Christian–Jewish reconciliation work and served as member of the board in the Commission for Christian-Jewish cooperation. In 1970 he was appointed as honorary member of the foundation Pro Oriente. Lüthi also furthered the dialogue between Christianity and Marxism, as well as talks between the arts and theology.

== Selected publications ==
- Judas Iskarioth in der Geschichte der Auslegung von der Reformation bis zur Gegenwart. Zürich 1955. [Judas Iscariot in the History of Interpretation from the Reformation Age to the Present]
- Gott und das Böse. Eine biblisch-theologische und systematische These zur Lehre vom Bösen, entworfen in Auseinandersetzung mit Schelling und Karl Barth. Zürich 1961. [God and the Evil]
- (with Kurt Marti and Kurt von Fischer): Moderne Literatur, Malerei und Musik : 3 Entwürfe zu einer Begegnung zwischen Glaube und Kunst. Zürich 1963. [Modern Literature, Painting and Music: Encounters between the Faith and the Arts]
- Die neue Welt der Schriftsteller. Theologische Argumente für die Literatur der Gegenwart. Stuttgart 1968. [The New World of Writers. Theological Arguments for the Contemporary Literature]
- Theologie als Dialog mit der Welt von heute. Freiburg im Breisgau 1971. [Theology as Dialogue with the World of Today]
- Gottes neue Eva. Transformations of the Feminine. Stuttgart 1978.[Gods new Eve]
- Feminismus und Romantik. Sprache, Gesellschaft, Symbole, Religion. Vienna – Cologne – Graz 1985. [Feminism and Romanticism. Language, Society, Symbols, Religion]
- (ed. with Koloman N. Micskey): Theologie im Dialog mit Freud und seiner Wirkungsgeschichte. Wien 1991. [Theology in Dialogue with Freud and his Impact]
- Mut zum fraglichen Sein. Wege eines Theologen zu zeitgenössischer Kunst und Literatur. Wien 1996. [Courage to a Questionable Existence. Way of a Theologian to Contemporary Art and Literature]
- Christliche Sexualität. Traditionen, Optionen, Alternativen. Vienna 2001. [Christian Sexuality. Traditions, Options, Alternates]

== Literature ==
- Thomas Krobath, Dieter Olaf Schmalstieg, Max J. Suda (ed.): Befreiung in Zwängen : für Kurt Lüthi. Vienna: Verlag für Gesellschaftskritik 1986. [Liberation in constraints – for Kurt Lüthi]
