= Reggie Pearman =

American middle-distance runner

Reginald James Pearman III (May 23, 1924 – June 11, 2012) was an American middle distance runner who competed in the 1952 Summer Olympics. Born to Bermudian immigrants in Manhattan, he served in the United States Army during World War II and the Korean War. Following his athletic career, he also worked for the Peace Corps and United States Office of Education. He graduated from Newtown High School and New York University.

Pearman competed for the NYU Violets track and field team in the NCAA.
