= John Gough (Canadian football) =

Canadian football player

Profile
- Position: End

Personal information
- Born: 1920s Nova Scotia, Canada
- Listed height: 6 ft 5 in (1.96 m)
- Listed weight: 210 lb (95 kg)

Career information
- College: Oklahoma

Career history
- 1952–1954: Edmonton Eskimos

John R. Gough was a Canadian professional football player who played for the Edmonton Eskimos. He played college football at the University of Oklahoma in the United States.

Gough was also a triple jumper for the Oklahoma Sooners track and field team. He was runner-up in the triple jump at the 1946 Drake Relays. He was considered a probable Olympic selection to represent Canada at the 1948 Summer Olympics. He was previously a high jumper and 880 yards runner. He won the 1942 Canadian Athletics Championships over 880 yards.

Gough, who had gone to Alberta to drill for oil, signed for Edmonton in 1952.
