= Sohan Singh Dhanoa =

Indian middle-distance runner

Personal information
- Nationality: Indian
- Born: 15 February 1930

Sport
- Sport: Middle-distance running
- Event: 800 metres

Sohan Singh Dhanoa (born 15 February 1930) is an Indian middle-distance runner. He competed in the 800 metres at the 1952 Summer Olympics and the 1956 Summer Olympics.
