= Ingvar Bengtsson =

Swedish middle-distance runner

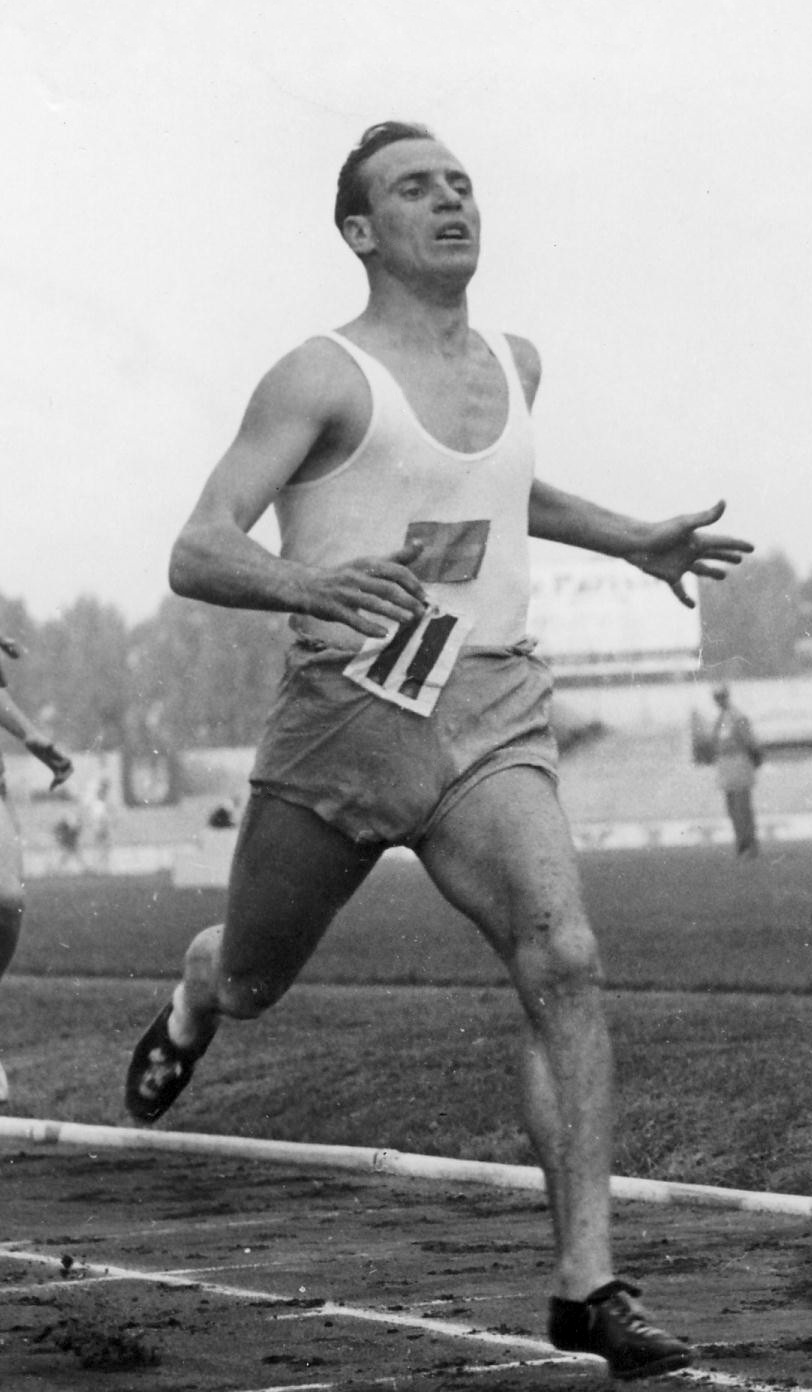
- Ingvar Bengtsson in 1949

Personal information
- Born: 10 April 1922 Obbola, Sweden
- Died: 6 April 2001 (aged 78) Söderhamn, Sweden
- Height: 1.82 m (6 ft 0 in)
- Weight: 73 kg (161 lb)

Sport
- Sport: Athletics
- Event(s): 800 m, 1500 m
- Club: Gefle IF, Gävle

Achievements and titles
- Personal best(s): 800 m – 1:49.4 (1948); 1500 m – 3.48.6 (1949)

Bengt Rolf Ingvar Bengtsson (10 April 1922 – 6 April 2001) was a Swedish middle-distance runner. He competed in the 800 m event at the 1948 Summer Olympics and 1950 European Athletics Championships and finished in fifth and fourth place, respectively. Bengtsson won the national titles in the 800 m (1948–50) and 4 × 1500 m relay (1947–49) and held a world record in the relay.
