= Karl Volkmer =

Swiss sprinter (1922–2023)

Personal information
- Nationality: Swiss
- Born: 20 March 1922 Basel, Switzerland
- Died: 19 December 2023 (aged 101)

Sport
- Sport: Sprinting
- Event: 4 × 400 metres relay

Karl Volkmer (20 March 1922 – 19 December 2023) was a Swiss sprinter. He competed in the men's 4 × 400 metres relay at the 1948 Summer Olympics. Volkmer turned 100 in March 2022. He died on 19 December 2023, at the age of 101.
