= Rune Gustafsson (athlete) =

Swedish middle-distance runner

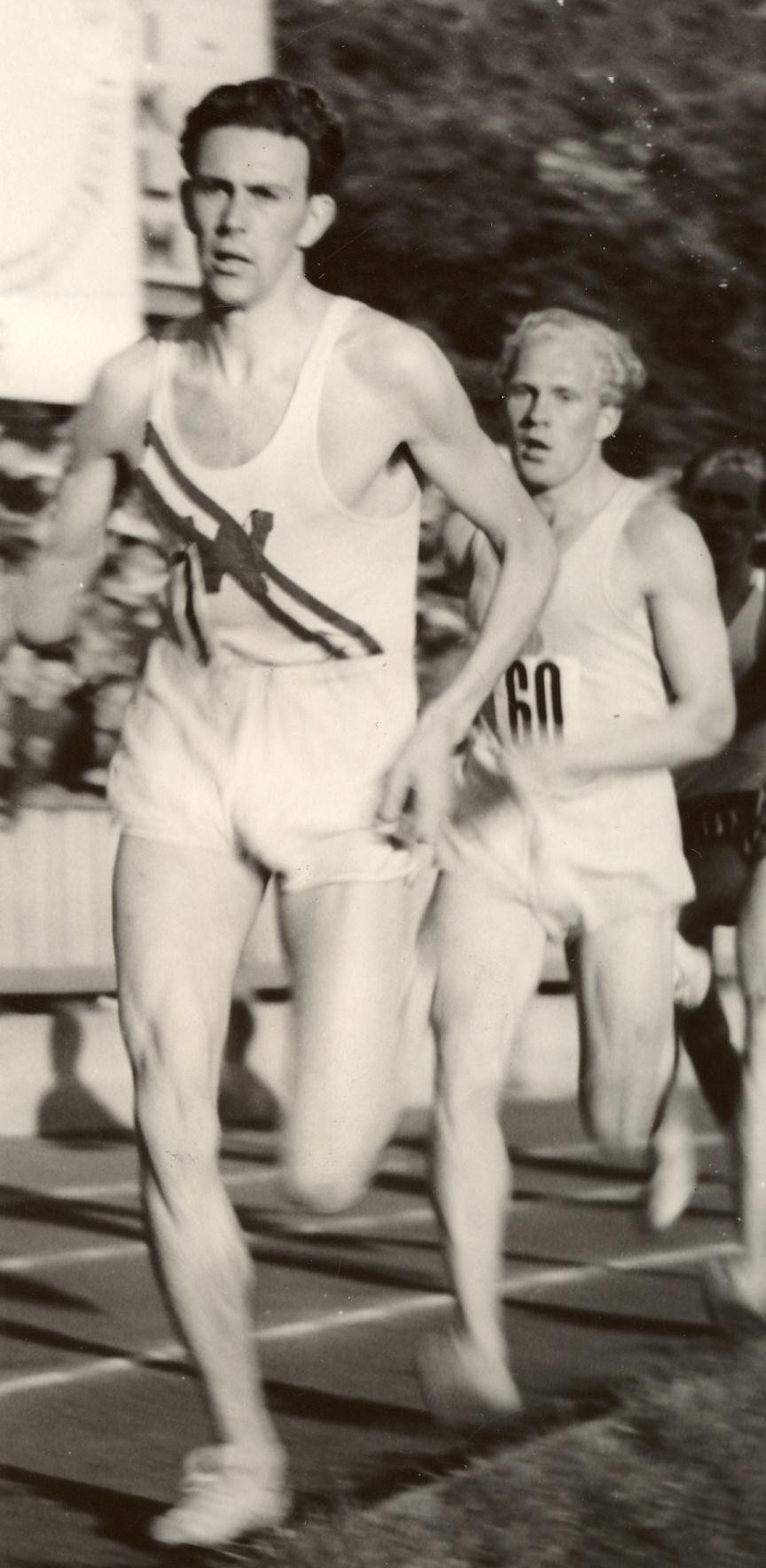

Personal information
- Born: 1 December 1919
- Died: 25 June 2011 (aged 91)

Sport
- Sport: Athletics
- Event: 800–5000 m
- Club: Värnamo SK

Achievements and titles
- Personal best(s): 800 m – 1:50.0 (1946); 1500 m – 3:47.4 (1944); Mile – 4:04.6 (1943); 5000 m – 14:39.6 (1944)
Medal record
Men's athletics
Representing Sweden
European Championships
Gold medal – first place	1946 Oslo	800 m

Rune Gustafsson (1 December 1919 – 25 June 2011) was a Swedish middle-distance runner who broke the 1000 m world record in Borås in 1946. He lowered the previous record by Rudolf Harbig by 0.1 s to 2:21.4 min. The same year he also won the national and European titles in the 800 m.
