= John Parlett =

British track and field athlete (1925–2022)

Personal information
- Nationality: British (English)
- Born: 19 April 1925 Bromley, Kent, England
- Died: 6 March 2022 (aged 96) Woodford Green, East London, England
- Height: 180 cm (5 ft 11 in)
- Weight: 62 kg (137 lb)

Sport
- Sport: Athletics
- Event: middle-distance
- Club: Dorking St. Paul's AC
Medal record
Men's athletics
Representing England
British Empire Games
Gold medal – first place	1950 Auckland	800 m
Silver medal – second place	1950 Auckland	4 × 400 relay
Representing Great Britain
European Championships
Gold medal – first place	1950 Brussels	800 m

Harold John Parlett (19 April 1925 – 6 March 2022) was a British track and field athlete who competed in the 1948 Summer Olympics. He was born in Bromley, Greater London.

== Biography ==
Parlett attended Tiffin School, where he joined the ATC. He later joined the RAF, and left in 1947. In 1942, he joined the Dorking St. Paul's Athletic Club and broke he 880 yards club record before winning the Surrey and Southern Counties title and representing England against France in 1947.

Parlett finished third behind Tom White in the 880 yards event at the 1947 AAA Championships before becoming the became the British 880 yards champion after winning the British AAA Championships title at the 1948 AAA Championships. Shortly after his AAA win he represented the Great Britain team at the 1948 Olympic Games in London.

Parlett won a second AAA title at the 1949 AAA Championships.

Parlett was the 800 metres champion at the 1950 European Athletics Championships. Representing England, he won the 880-yard run at the 1950 British Empire Games and was also a silver medallist in the 4 × 440 yards relay. His personal best for the 800 m was 1:50.5 minutes, set in 1950.

On 26 September 1951 he set a world record as part of a 4 × 800 metres relay team, that consisted of Bill Nankeville, Albert Webster and Frank Evans. The quartet recorded 7:30.6 at the White City Stadium.

In 1979 Parlett married Dorothy Manley (then Dorothy Hall, widowed in 1973). He died on 6 March 2022, at the age of 96.
