= Joseph Brys =

Belgian middle-distance runner (1927–2001)

Personal information
- Nationality: Belgian
- Born: 2 July 1927 Bredene, Belgium
- Died: 1 September 2001 (aged 74) Assebroek, Belgium

Sport
- Sport: Middle-distance running
- Event: 800 metres

Joseph Brys (2 July 1927 – 1 September 2001) was a Belgian middle-distance runner. He competed in the men's 800 metres at the 1948 Summer Olympics.
