= Mal Whitfield =

Tuskegee Airman and US Olympic athlete 1924–2015)

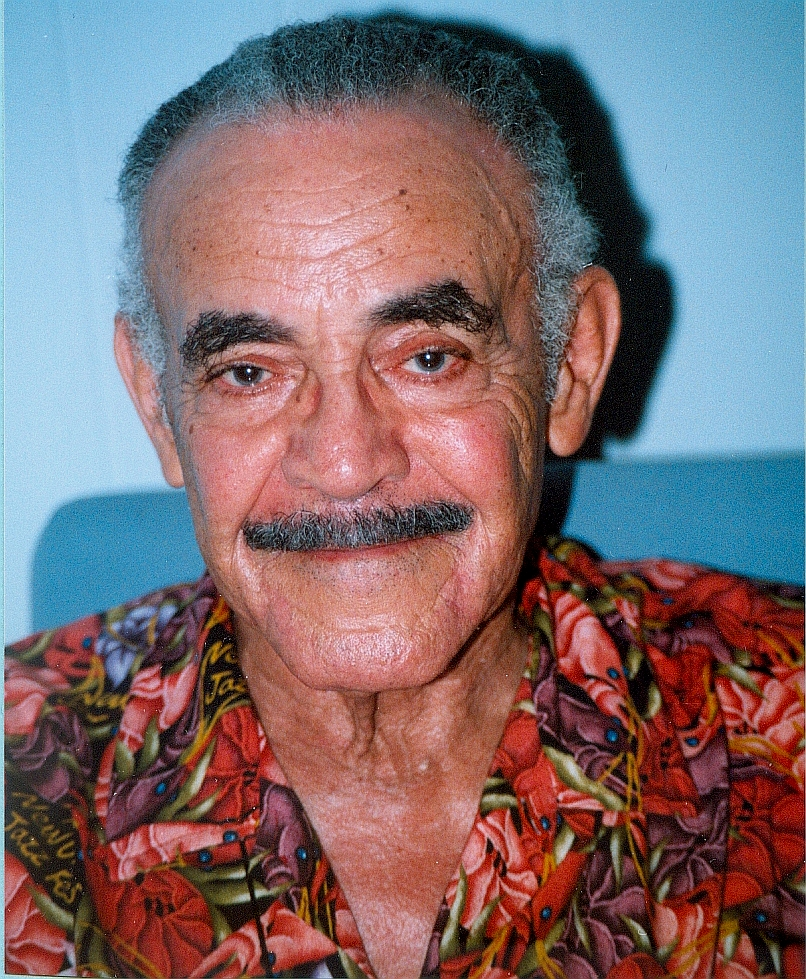
- Whitfield in 1998

Personal information
- Nickname: Marvelous Mal
- Born: Malvin Greston Whitfield; October 11, 1924 Bay City, Texas, U.S.
- Died: November 19, 2015 (aged 91) Washington, D.C., U.S.
- Height: 6 ft 0 in (183 cm)
- Weight: 168 lb (76 kg)

Sport
- Sport: Track and field
- Events: 400 metres, 800 metres

Achievements and titles
- Personal bests: 400 m: 45.9 (1953); 800 m: 1:47.9 (1953)
Medal record
Men's athletics
Representing the United States
Olympic Games
Gold medal – first place	1948 London	800 m
Gold medal – first place	1948 London	4 × 400 m relay
Gold medal – first place	1952 Helsinki	800 m
Silver medal – second place	1952 Helsinki	4 × 400 m relay
Bronze medal – third place	1948 London	400 m
Pan American Games
Gold medal – first place	1951 Buenos Aires	400 m
Gold medal – first place	1951 Buenos Aires	800 m
Gold medal – first place	1951 Buenos Aires	4 × 400 m relay

Malvin Greston Whitfield (October 11, 1924 – November 19, 2015) was an American athlete, goodwill ambassador, and airman. Nicknamed Marvelous Mal, he was the Olympic champion in the 800 meters at the 1948 and 1952 Summer Olympics, and a member of the 1948 gold medal team in the 4 × 400 metres relay. Overall, Whitfield was a five-time Olympic medalist (three gold, one silver, one bronze). After his competitive career, he worked for 47 years as a coach, goodwill ambassador, as well as an athletic mentor in Africa on behalf of the United States Information Service.

== Early life ==
Whitfield was born in Bay City, Texas. He moved to the Watts district of Los Angeles when he was 4 years old. At that age, his father died. His mother died when he was 12, after which he was raised by his older sister. He sneaked into the Los Angeles Memorial Coliseum during the 1932 Summer Olympic Games, where he watched Eddie Tolan defeat Ralph Metcalfe in the 100 meter race, an event that spurred his own Olympic goals.

Whitfield joined the United States Army Air Forces in 1943 as a member of the Tuskegee Airmen. After World War II, he remained in the military, but also enrolled at Ohio State University. In the early 1950s, he also served in the United States Air Force during the Korean War, flying 27 combat missions as a tail gunner. Under the coaching of Larry Snyder, he won the NCAA title while at Ohio State in the 800 m in 1948 and 880 yd in 1949. After leaving the university, he won the AAU title from 1949 to 1951 at 800 m, in 1953 and 1954 at 880 yd and in 1952 at 400 m. He also won the 800 m at the 1951 Pan American Games in Buenos Aires, Argentina.

== Olympic career ==
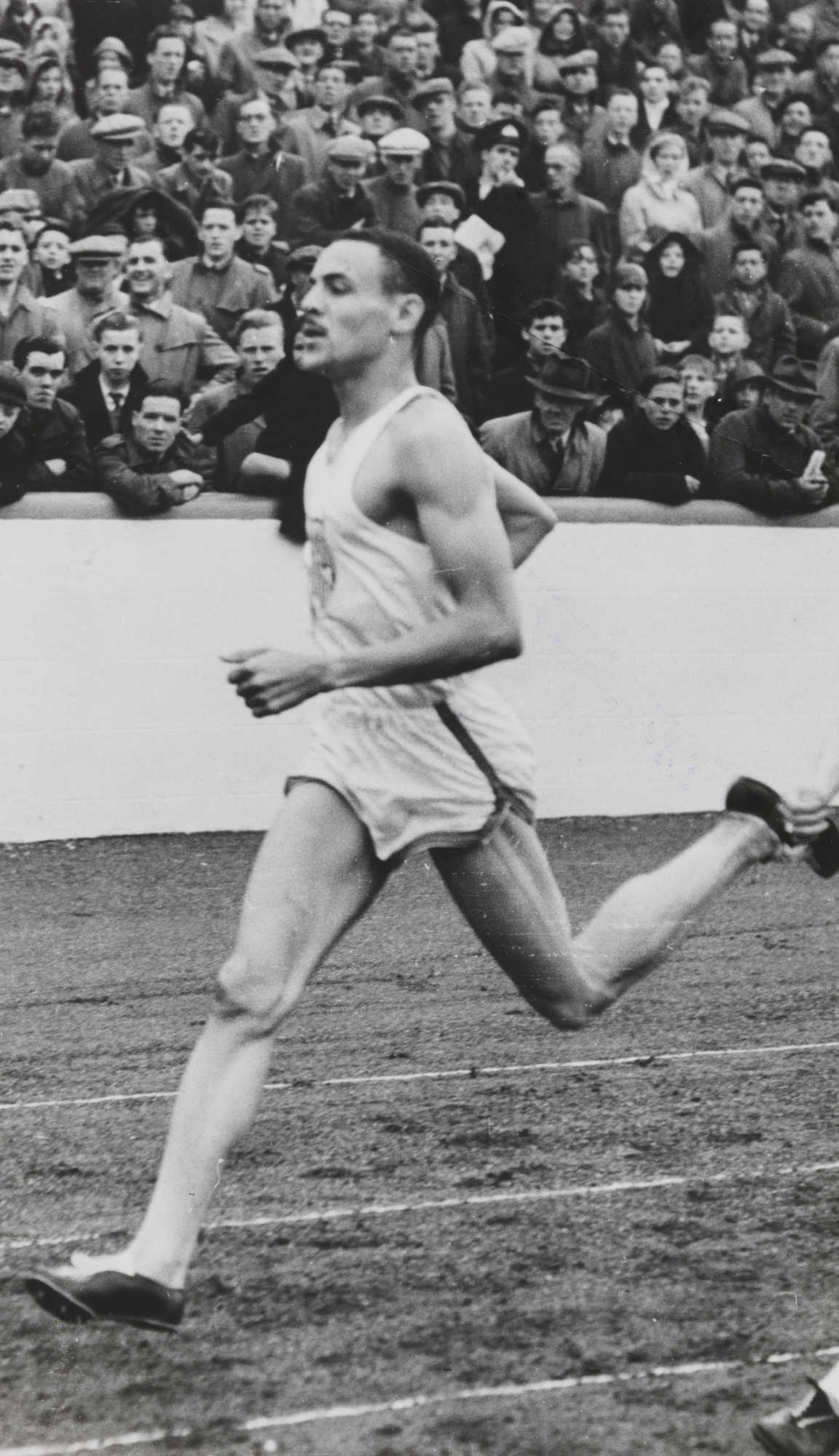
Whitfield at the 1948 Summer Olympics

At the 1948 Olympics in London, Whitfield won the 800 m and was a member of the winning 4 × 400 m relay team. He also earned a bronze medal in the 400 m. At the 1952 Olympics in Helsinki, Finland, he repeated his 800 m victory. He also earned a silver medal as a member of United States 4 × 400 m relay team. He set a world record at 880 yd of 1:49.2 in 1950 and dropped it to 1:48.6 in 1952. In 1954, Whitfield became the first black athlete to win the James E. Sullivan Award, given annually by the Amateur Athletic Union of the United States (AAU) to the outstanding amateur athlete in the country. Whitfield narrowly missed making the 1956 Olympic team while a student at California State University, Los Angeles, and he retired from track competition shortly thereafter.

== Sports ambassador ==
After graduating, he worked for the United States Department of State and the United States Information Service, conducting sports clinics in Africa.

In his 47 years in Africa, Whitfield trained and gave consultation to dozens of athletes who represented their countries as Olympians and All-Africa Games champions. He coached in 20 countries and lived in Kenya, Uganda and Egypt. Whitfield also arranged sports scholarships for over 5,000 African athletes to study in the United States. During his career as a diplomat, he traveled to over 132 countries and played a key role in training and developing African athletes. United States President Ronald Reagan wrote of him: "Whether flying combat missions over Korea, or winning gold medal after gold medal at the Olympics, or serving as an ambassador of goodwill among the young athletes of Africa, you have given your all. This country is proud of you, and grateful to you." Shortly after his retirement from government service in 1989, Whitfield was invited to the Oval Office, where President George H. W. Bush recognized his service to the nation and the world.

== Awards ==
In 1954, Whitfield won the James E. Sullivan Award for amateur athletics. Whitfield was inducted into the National Track and Field Hall of Fame in 1974, and Ohio State Varsity O Hall of Fame in 1978. Among track and field athletes, only Jesse Owens had been inducted before him.

== Memoir ==
Whitfield wrote the book Learning to Run, which was translated into French. His memoir was published by his foundation and titled Beyond the Finish Line.

== Personal life ==
He was married to Nola Whitfield. He was also the father of Nyna Konishi, Lonnie Whitfield, CNN anchor Fredricka Whitfield and accomplished high jumper Ed Wright. In 1989 Whitfield founded the Mal Whitfield Foundation for the promotion of sports, academics, and culture. The foundation has distributed 5,000 athletic scholarships.

Whitfield died at a Department of Veterans Affairs hospice center in Washington, D.C. on the night of November 19, 2015, aged 91. He was interred at Arlington National Cemetery.

== Competition record ==
Year	Competition	Venue	Position	Event	Time
Representing United States
1948	Olympics	London, United Kingdom	3rd	400 m	46.9

== See also ==
- Dogfights (TV series)
- Executive Order 9981
- List of Tuskegee Airmen
- Military history of African Americans
- The Tuskegee Airmen (movie)
