= Tom White (runner) =

British middle-distance runner (1917–1985)

Personal information
- Nationality: British (English)
- Born: 16 November 1917 Brigg, North Lincolnshire, England
- Died: 30 January 1985 (aged 67) Scunthorpe, England
- Height: 170 cm (5 ft 7 in)
- Weight: 59 kg (130 lb)

Sport
- Sport: Middle-distance running
- Event: 800 metres
- Club: Lincoln Wellington AC; Appleby Frodingham SC

Charles Thomas White (16 November 1917 – 30 January 1985) was a British middle-distance runner. He competed in the 800 metres at the 1948 Summer Olympics and the 1952 Summer Olympics.

== Biography ==
White born in Brigg, North Lincolnshire, lived at 149 Berkeley Street in Scunthorpe. He attended Brigg Grammar School. His father Percy also played sport.

White finished second behind Arthur Wint in the 880 yards event at the 1946 AAA Championships and the following month finished fifth in the 800 metres at the 1946 European Athletics Championships.

White became the British 880 yards champion after winning the British AAA Championships title at the 1947 AAA Championships. White represented the Great Britain team at the 1948 Olympic Games in London, competing in the 800 metres.

He married on 20 September 1949 to Mary Webster, a half-mile athlete, at Scunthorpe registry office. The honeymoon was in Jersey. He trained with the Appleby-Frodingham club from October 1949. The following February, White finished fifth in the 880 yards for the England athletics team at the 1950 British Empire Games, as well as 5th in the 1 mile event.

White appeared at a second Olympic Games in 1952, when he represented the Great Britain team at the 1952 Olympic Games in Helsinki.

The family lived at 35 Devonshire Road in Scunthorpe, with two sons Richard and Alan. He collapsed and died, aged 67, at Holme Hall Golf Club. The funeral was held on Tuesday 5 February 1985 at 10.30am.
