= Deaths in September 2010 =

The following is a list of notable deaths in September 2010.

Entries for each day are listed alphabetically by surname. A typical entry lists information in the following sequence:

- Name, age, country of citizenship at birth, subsequent country of citizenship (if applicable), reason for notability, cause of death (if known), and reference.

== September 2010 ==
=== 1 ===
- Tomás Pedro Barbosa da Silva Nunes, 67, Portuguese Roman Catholic prelate, Auxiliary Bishop of Lisboa (since 1998).
- Sir Colville Barclay, 97, British painter and botanist.
- Robert B. Cutler, 96, American Olympic rower.
- Wakanohana Kanji I, 82, Japanese sumo wrestler, kidney cancer.
- Cammie King, 76, American actress (Gone with the Wind), lung cancer.
- Don Lang, 95, American baseball player, after long illness.
- Molly Lazechko, 84, American politician.
- Jean Nelissen, 74, Dutch cycling journalist.

=== 2 ===
- Roland Arpin, 76, Canadian educator, communicator, and public administrator, Parkinson's disease.
- Trevor Beard, 90, Australian physician.
- Germán Dehesa, 66, writer and announcer, cancer.
- Shmuel Eisenstadt, 86, Israeli sociologist.
- Bob Loveless, 81, American knife maker and manufacturer.
- Eileen Nearne, 89, British Special Operations Executive agent in World War II, heart attack. (body discovered on this date)
- Pedro Marcos Ribeiro da Costa, 88, Angolan Roman Catholic prelate, Bishop of Saurímo (1977–1997).
- Jackie Sinclair, 67, Scottish footballer (Dunfermline Athletic, Newcastle United), cancer.
- Leo Trepp, 97, German-born American rabbi, last surviving German rabbinical witness to the Holocaust.
- Morgan White, 86, American actor and children's television host.

=== 3 ===
- Larry Ashmead, 78, American book editor.
- Micky Burn, 97, British writer and poet.
- David Bushnell, 86, American historian, expert on Colombia, cancer.
- Mike Edwards, 62, English cellist (Electric Light Orchestra), traffic collision.
- Noah Howard, 67, American jazz saxophonist.
- Juan Huerta Montero, 46, Mexican politician, deputy (since 2009), plane crash.
- Dušan Lukášik, 78, Czech Olympic basketball player.
- Robert Schimmel, 60, American stand-up comedian (The Howard Stern Show), traffic collision.
- Sir Cyril Smith, 82, British politician, Member of Parliament for Rochdale (1972–1992).
- José Augusto Torres, 71, Portuguese football player and coach, Alzheimer's disease.
- Guillermo Zavaleta Rojas, 34, Mexican politician, deputy (since 2009), plane crash.

=== 4 ===
- Oleksandra Bandura, 92, Ukrainian teacher and literature scholar.
- Francis Gerard Brooks, 86, Northern Irish Roman Catholic prelate, Bishop of Dromore (1976–1999).
- Paul Conrad, 86, American Pulitzer Prize-winning political cartoonist (Los Angeles Times).
- John Gouriet, 75, British political campaigner (The Freedom Association) and author.
- Kálmán Kulcsár, 82, Hungarian jurist and politician, Minister of Justice (1988–1990).
- Bonnie Leman, American art historian, writer, and publisher of Quilter's Newsletter Magazine

=== 5 ===
- Hedley Beare, 77, Australian education leader.
- Corneille Guillaume Beverloo, 88, Dutch artist.
- David Dortort, 93, American television producer and writer (Bonanza, The High Chaparral).
- Ludvig Eikaas, 89, Norwegian artist.
- Elizabeth Jenkins, 104, English author.
- Lewis Nkosi, 73, South African writer.
- Homi Sethna, 86, Indian nuclear scientist and chemical engineer.
- R. Smith Simpson, 103, American Foreign Service Officer.
- Abdul Mannan Syed, 67, Bangladeshi poet.
- Jefferson Thomas, 67, American civil rights pioneer, member of the Little Rock Nine, pancreatic cancer.
- Shoya Tomizawa, 19, Japanese Moto2 motorcycle racer, race crash.
- Angelo Vassallo, 56, Italian politician, Mayor of Pollica, shot.

=== 6 ===
- Clive Donner, 84, British film director (The Caretaker, What's New Pussycat?), Alzheimer's disease.
- Bob Jencks, 69, American football player (Chicago Bears), heart attack.
- John McKellar, 80, Australian comedy writer.
- Yvonne O'Neill, 74, Canadian politician, MPP for Ottawa–Rideau (1987–1995), cancer.

=== 7 ===
- Claude Béchard, 41, Canadian politician, MNA for Kamouraska-Témiscouata (1997–2010), cancer.
- Eberhard von Brauchitsch, 83, German industrial manager, suicide.
- Amar Garibović, 19, Serbian Olympic cross-country skier, traffic collision.
- William H. Goetzmann, 80, American historian.
- Barbara Holland, 77, American author, lung cancer.
- Jack Kershaw, 96, American attorney who represented James Earl Ray.
- John Kluge, 95, German-born American entrepreneur and billionaire, richest person in the United States (1989–1990).
- Brendan Lyons, 83, Australian politician, member of the Tasmanian House of Assembly for Bass (1982–1986).
- Riad al-Saray, 35, Iraqi television presenter, shot.
- Joaquín Soler Serrano, 91, Spanish journalist, Alzheimer's disease.
- Glenn Shadix, 58, American actor (Beetlejuice, The Nightmare Before Christmas, Heathers), injuries sustained in a fall.
- Wilebaldo Solano, 94, Spanish communist activist during the Spanish Civil War.
- Lucius Walker, 80, American pastor, heart attack.

=== 8 ===
- Wazir Agha, 88, Pakistani Urdu language writer, poet, critic and essayist.
- Jenny Alpha, 100, Martinique-born French actress and singer.
- Hadley Caliman, 78, American jazz saxophonist, liver cancer.
- Rich Cronin, 36, American pop singer and songwriter (LFO), stroke related to acute myelogenous leukemia.
- Allen Dale June, 91, American original Navajo code talker.
- Thomas Guinzburg, 84, American editor, co-creator and co-founder of The Paris Review, complications from heart bypass surgery.
- Safah Abdul Hameed, Iraqi journalist, shot.
- Bernice Lapp, 92, American Olympic bronze medal-winning (1936) swimmer.
- Murali, 46, Indian Tamil actor, heart attack.
- Irwin Silber, 84, American writer and journalist, complications of Alzheimer's disease.
- Israel Tal, 86, Israeli general.
- George Christopher Williams, 84, American evolutionary biologist, Parkinson's disease.

=== 9 ===
- Gene Case, 72, American advertising executive, heart attack.
- Heriberto Correa Yepes, 94, Colombian Vicar Apostolic of Buenaventura (1973–1996).
- Lennie von Graevenitz, 75, South African boxer.
- Bent Larsen, 75, Danish chess grandmaster.
- Rauno Mäkinen, 79, Finnish wrestler and Olympic gold medalist.
- Venu Nagavally, 61, Indian actor and screenwriter.
- Eddie Phillips, 80, American baseball player (St. Louis Cardinals).
- Mary Richard, 70, Canadian aboriginal activist and politician.
- Riccardo Sarfatti, 70, Italian businessman, traffic collision.
- Kamilla Składanowska, 62, Polish Olympic fencer.
- Frank Wanlass, 77, American electrical engineer.

=== 10 ===
- Margaret Auld, 78, Scottish nurse.
- Juan Mari Brás, 82, Puerto Rican independence advocate.
- Gizela Dali, 70, Greek actress, cancer.
- Willian Lara, 53, Venezuelan journalist and politician, Governor of Guárico, drowned.
- Fridrikh Maryutin, 85, Russian Olympic footballer.
- Billie Mae Richards, 88, Canadian voice actress (The Care Bears Movie, Rudolph the Red-Nosed Reindeer, Rudolph's Shiny New Year), stroke.
- Andrei Timoshenko, 41, Russian football player.
- Edwin Charles Tubb, 90, British science fiction author.
- Ron Walters, 72, American scholar and civil rights activist, cancer.

=== 11 ===
- Opal Wilcox Barron, 95, American First Lady of West Virginia (1961–1965).
- Tom Bingham, Baron Bingham of Cornhill, 76, British judge and Law Lord, cancer.
- Bärbel Bohley, 65, German artist and opposition figure, lung cancer.
- Hugh Clark, 86, British army officer.
- King Coleman, 78, American rhythm and blues singer ("Do the Mashed Potatoes"), heart failure.
- Harold Gould, 86, American actor (The Sting, Rhoda, The Golden Girls), prostate cancer.
- Gunnar Hoffsten, 86, Swedish jazz musician.
- Ron Kramer, 75, American football player (Green Bay Packers, Detroit Lions), heart attack.
- Kevin McCarthy, 96, American actor (Invasion of the Body Snatchers, Death of a Salesman, Flamingo Road).
- Fathi Osman, 82, Egyptian author, heart failure.
- Taavi Peetre, 27, Estonian shot putter, drowning.
- Diego Rodríguez, 22, Uruguayan footballer (Club Nacional de Football), traffic collision.
- Mike Shaw, 53, American professional wrestler, heart attack.
- Kei Tani, 78, Japanese comedian.

=== 12 ===
- Charles Ansbacher, 67, American conductor.
- Val Belcher, 56, American-born Canadian football player (Ottawa Rough Riders), heart failure.
- Pietro Calabrese, 66, Italian journalist (Il Messaggero, La Gazzetta dello Sport, Panorama), lung cancer.
- Claude Chabrol, 80, French film director (Madame Bovary, Story of Women).
- Kalman J. Cohen, 79, American economist.
- Honor Frost, 92, British underwater archaeologist.
- Günter Heßelmann, 85, German Olympic athlete.
- Varnette Honeywood, 59, American painter, cancer.
- Argiris Kavidas, 33, Greek actor (Strella), cardiac arrest.
- La Fiera, 49, Mexican professional wrestler, stabbed.
- Wesley Duke Lee, 78, Brazilian visual artist, heart failure.
- Antonina Pirozhkova, 101, Russian civil engineer and writer.
- Judith Merkle Riley, 68, American professor and author, ovarian cancer.
- Swarnalatha, 37, Indian playback singer, lung infection.
- Joe Tarnowski, 88, Polish-born Scottish electronics engineer and intelligence officer.

=== 13 ===
- John Arundel Barnes, 92, Australian-born British social anthropologist.
- Stan Gooch, 78, British psychologist.
- Don Goodson, 77, English cricketer (Leicestershire).
- Lorne Greenaway, 77, Canadian politician, MP for Cariboo—Chilcotin (1979–1988), amyotrophic lateral sclerosis.
- Jim Greenwood, 81, Scottish rugby player.
- Robert W. McCollum, 85, American virologist, made discoveries relating to polio and hepatitis, heart failure.
- Robert Rompre, 81, American ice hockey player.
- Barbara B. Smith, 88, American religious leader, pulmonary fibrosis.
- Gus Williams, 73, Australian Aboriginal leader and country music singer.

=== 14 ===
- Mohammed Arkoun, 82, Algerian-born French Islamic philosopher, professor at Sorbonne.
- Caterina Boratto, 95, Italian film actress.
- Sir James Cleminson, 89, British soldier and businessman.
- Ralph T. Coe, 81, American art museum director and Native American advocate, natural causes.
- Gennadi Gerasimov, 80, Russian diplomat, Soviet Ambassador to Portugal (1990–1995).
- José Janene, 55, Brazilian politician involved in Mensalão scandal, septic shock.
- Frederick Jelinek, 77, Czech-born American speech recognition researcher.
- Paulo Machado de Carvalho Filho, 86, Brazilian businessman, founder of Jovem Pan Radio.
- Francis Mansour Zayek, 89, American Maronite Catholic prelate, founding Archbishop of Saint Maron of Brooklyn.
- Dodge Morgan, 78, American businessman, fourth person in history to circumnavigate globe alone, cancer.
- Francisco Ribeiro, 45, Portuguese musician (Madredeus), liver cancer.
- Nicholas Selby, 85, British actor.
- Kálmán Tolnai, 85, Hungarian Olympic sailor.
- James E. Winner Jr., 81, American entrepreneur, inventor of The Club, traffic collision.

=== 15 ===
- Arrow, 60, Montserratian soca musician ("Hot Hot Hot"), complications from brain cancer.
- Angidi Chettiar, 82, Mauritian politician, President (2002) and Vice President (1997–2002; since 2007).
- Bettie Cilliers-Barnard, 95, South African artist, natural causes.
- Frank Jarvis, 70, British character actor (The Italian Job, A Bridge Too Far).
- Alvin Krenzler, 89, American judge and real estate developer.
- Al LaMacchia, 89, American baseball player (St. Louis Browns) and executive, stroke.
- Richard Livsey, Baron Livsey of Talgarth, 75, British politician, MP for Brecon and Radnorshire (1985–1992; 1997–2001).
- Erkki Rönnholm, 86, Finnish Olympic athlete.
- Peter Stebler, 83, Swiss Olympic silver medal-winning (1948) rower.
- Guido Turchi, 93, Italian composer.

=== 16 ===
- Victor Adibe Chikwe, 72, Nigerian Roman Catholic prelate, first Bishop of Ahiara (since 1988).
- Berni Collas, 56, Belgian politician, Senator (since 2007).
- James Dillion, 81, American Olympic bronze medal-winning (1952) discus thrower.
- Helen Escobedo, 76, Mexican artist and sculptor, cancer.
- Imran Farooq, 50, Pakistani politician (1992–2010), stabbed.
- Friedrich Wilhelm, Prince of Hohenzollern, 86, German Head of the House of Hohenzollern-Sigmaringen (since 1965).
- John D. Goeken, 80, American entrepreneur, founder of MCI Communications, cancer.
- Tsvetan Golomeev, 49, Bulgarian Olympic swimmer.
- Keiju Kobayashi, 86, Japanese actor, heart failure.
- Mickey Mangham, 71, American football player.
- George N. Parks, 57, American college band director (University of Massachusetts Amherst), heart attack.
- Mario Rodríguez Cobos, 72, Argentine politician, writer and religious leader.
- Jack Sullivan, 75, American basketball player and labor lobbyist, septic shock.
- Jim Towers, 77, English football player (Brentford).
- Wayne Twitchell, 62, American baseball player (Milwaukee Brewers, New York Mets), cancer.
- Hans Wagner, 87, Austrian ice hockey player.
- Robert J. White, 84, American neurosurgeon.

=== 17 ===
- Robert Babington, 90, British politician, member of the House of Commons of Northern Ireland for North Down (1969–1972).
- Gloria Colón, 79, Puerto Rican Olympic fencer.
- Sergio Di Stefano, 71, Italian actor and voice actor, heart attack.
- Puttaraj Gawai, 96, Indian Hindustani singer.
- Whitey Grant, 94, American guitarist (Whitey and Hogan).
- András Harangvölgyi, 86, Hungarian Olympic skier.
- Bill Littlejohn, 96, American animator (Tom and Jerry, Peanuts), natural causes.
- Jean-Marcel Jeanneney, 99, French politician, Minister of Justice (1969).
- Louis Marks, 82, British script writer and producer.
- Vojteh Ravnikar, 67, Slovenian architect.
- Noble Threewitt, 99, American racehorse trainer.
- Robert Truax, 93, American Navy captain and rocket engineer, prostate cancer.
- Wayne Winterrowd, 68, American gardening expert, heart failure.

=== 18 ===
- Mohamed Abul-Khair, 34, Saudi Arabian terrorist, drone strike.
- James Bacon, 96, American author, journalist and actor (Escape from the Planet of the Apes, Meteor), heart failure.
- Øystein Gåre, 56, Norwegian football coach (Bodø/Glimt, Norway U21), after short illness.
- Aubrey Jackman, 89, British army officer, hotelier and military tattoo producer.
- Jill Johnston, 81, American lesbian feminist and writer, stroke.
- Egon Klepsch, 80, German politician, President of the European Parliament (1992–1994).
- Sam Kooistra, 75, American Olympic water polo player.
- Will Renfro, 78, American football player (Washington Redskins), complications following heart surgery.
- Mohinder Singh Pujji, 92, Indian fighter pilot, Squadron Leader (World War II), stroke.
- Irving Schwartz, 81, Canadian businessman.
- Bobby Smith, 77, English footballer (Chelsea, Tottenham Hotspur).
- Inge Steensland, 86, Norwegian resistance leader and shipping magnate, complications from a stroke.
- Ingjald Ørbeck Sørheim, 73, Norwegian jurist and politician, complications from a stroke.
- Wallace Turner, 89, American Pulitzer Prize-winning reporter (The Oregonian).
- Austin Volk, 91, American politician and historian, Mayor of Englewood, New Jersey (1960–1963, 1966–1968).
- Walter Womacka, 84, German painter.

=== 19 ===
- Dan Arbeid, 82, English studio potter.
- Howard Brodie, 94, American courtroom sketch artist.
- Ray Coleman, 88, American baseball player (Browns, Philadelphia A's, White Sox).
- Buddy Collette, 89, American jazz saxophonist.
- Bob Crossley, 98, British abstract artist.
- Edward Fenlon, 106, American judge.
- Sergey Gomonov, 49, Soviet and Belarusian footballer and coach.
- José de Jesús Gudiño Pelayo, 67, Mexican jurist, associate justice of the Supreme Court of Justice of the Nation, heart attack.
- Stoo Hample, 84, American cartoonist (Inside Woody Allen), cancer.
- Chrysostomos II Kioussis, 89, Greek Archbishop of Athens and of all Greece (Old Calendarists).
- Ivan Kirkov, 78, Bulgarian painter, lung cancer.
- José Antonio Labordeta, 75, Spanish songwriter, professor, writer, presenter and politician.
- László Polgár, 63, Hungarian opera singer, Grammy Award winner.
- Irving Ravetch, 89, American Academy Award-nominated screenwriter (Hud, Norma Rae), pneumonia.
- Max Salazar, 78, American author on Latin jazz.
- Murray Sayle, 84, Australian journalist and war correspondent, Parkinson's disease.
- Bouk Schellingerhoudt, 91, Dutch cyclist.

=== 20 ===
- Jack Cassini, 90, American baseball player.
- Fud Leclerc, 86, Belgian singer, first person to score nul points at the Eurovision Song Contest.
- Jakob Mayr, 86, Austrian Roman Catholic prelate, Auxiliary Bishop Emeritus of Salzburg.
- Kenny McKinley, 23, American football player (Denver Broncos), suicide by gunshot.
- Al Pilarcik, 80, American baseball player (Kansas City Athletics, Baltimore Orioles and Chicago White Sox).
- Jennifer Rardin, 45, American author, known for the Jaz Parks series of fantasy novels.
- Leonard Skinner, 77, American school teacher, namesake of Lynyrd Skynyrd, Alzheimer's disease.
- Kenneth Weaver, 94, American science writer (National Geographic Magazine).

=== 21 ===
- Carlos Abumohor, 89, Chilean businessman and investor.
- Sam Bailey, 86, American football, basketball, and baseball coach.
- Grace Bradley, 97, American actress (The Big Broadcast of 1938), widow of William Boyd.
- Geoffrey Burgon, 69, British composer.
- John Crawford, 90, American actor (The Poseidon Adventure, The Towering Inferno, The Waltons), stroke.
- Wes Davoren, 82, Australian politician, member of the New South Wales Legislative Assembly for Lakemba (1984–1995).
- Vinnie Doyle, 72, Irish journalist, editor of the Irish Independent, after short illness.
- Mickey Freeman, 93, American comedian and television actor (The Phil Silvers Show).
- Bernard Genoud, 68, Swiss Roman Catholic prelate, Bishop of Lausanne, Genève et Fribourg (1999–2010), lung cancer.
- Sindi Hawkins, 52, Canadian politician, MLA for Okanagan West (1996–2001) and Kelowna-Mission (2001–2009), leukemia.
- Jerrold E. Marsden, 68, Canadian mathematician.
- James Edward Michaels, 84, American Roman Catholic prelate, Auxiliary Bishop Emeritus of Wheeling-Charleston (1973–1987)
- Sandra Mondaini, 79, Italian actress, after long illness.
- Kenneth North, 80, American Air Force general.
- Don Partridge, 68, British musician and one-man band, heart attack.
- Shabtai Rosenne, 93, Israeli jurist and diplomat, cardiac arrest.
- Sir Archie Taioroa, 73, New Zealand Maori leader, stroke.
- Rual Yarbrough, 80, American banjo player, pulmonary fibrosis.

=== 22 ===
- Jack A. Adams, 88, American engineering psychologist, cancer.
- Jackie Burroughs, 71, English-born Canadian actress (Road to Avonlea, The Care Bears Movie, Willard), stomach cancer.
- Ray Bussard, 82, American swimming coach, member of the International Swimming Hall of Fame.
- Mike Celizic, 62, American sportswriter and author, T-cell lymphoma.
- Tyler Clementi, 18, American college student and cyberbullying victim, suicide by jumping.
- Apostolos Dimelis, 88, Greek Hierarch in Patriarchate of Constantinople, Metropolitan of Rhodes (1988–2004).
- Don Doll, 84, American football player and assistant coach (Detroit Lions).
- Eddie Fisher, 82, American singer and entertainer, complications from hip surgery.
- Eleuterio Francesco Fortino, 72, Italian Archimandrite of the Italo-Albanian Catholic Church (Eparchy of Lungro), Under Secretary of PCPCU (since 1987).
- Bruno Giorgi, 69, Italian football player and manager.
- Jorge González, 44, Argentine basketball player and professional wrestler, complications from diabetes.
- Graeme Hunt, 58, New Zealand journalist.
- Bridget O'Connor, 49, British playwright and screenwriter (Tinker Tailor Soldier Spy), cancer.
- Alan Rudkin, 68, British boxing champion.
- Van Snowden, 71, American puppeteer (Child's Play, H.R. Pufnstuf, Tales from the Crypt), cancer.
- Víctor Julio Suárez Rojas, 57, Colombian guerrilla (FARC), air strike.
- Vyacheslav Tsaryov, 39, Russian football player.
- James Tunney, 83, Canadian dairy farmer and politician, Senator from Ontario (2001–2002).

=== 23 ===
- Alfred Ahner, 88, American officer.
- William Andres, 85, Canadian politician and farmer.
- Malcolm Douglas, 69, Australian bushman and documentary maker, traffic collision.
- Arthur Holch, 86, American Emmy Award-winning television director and producer, heart failure.
- Gerald S. Lesser, 84, American psychologist, chief advisor to Sesame Street, cerebral hemorrhage.
- Teresa Lewis, 41, American convicted murderer, execution by lethal injection.
- Clinton Manges, 87, American football team owner (San Antonio Gunslingers) and oil tycoon, cancer.
- Fernando Riera, 90, Chilean football player and coach, heart attack.
- Bob Shaw, 77, American baseball player (Chicago White Sox), liver cancer.
- K. B. Tilak, 84, Indian independence activist and director, after long illness.
- Catherine Walker, 65, British fashion designer, cancer.

=== 24 ===
- George Ballis, 85, American photographer, cancer.
- Dick Griffey, 71, American record executive, founder of SOLAR Records, complications from heart surgery.
- William Harrison, 75, American obstetrician, leukemia.
- Oswalt Kolle, 81, German sex educator.
- Anneliese Küppers, 81, German equestrian.
- Olga C. Nardone, 89, American actress (The Wizard of Oz).
- Gilda O'Neill, 59, British novelist and historian, side effects of medication.
- Jure Robič, 45, Slovenian cyclist, five-time winner of the Race Across America, traffic collision.
- Santiago Salfate, 94, Chilean footballer.
- Gennady Yanayev, 73, Russian politician, Vice President of the USSR (1990–1991), nominal head of GKChP (1991), lung cancer.

=== 25 ===
- Aleksandra Artyomenko, 82, Soviet Olympic skier.
- Allan Elsom, 85, New Zealand rugby union player (Canterbury, national team).
- Sir Vincent Floissac, 82, Saint Lucian jurist and politician, Governor-General of Saint Lucia (1987–1988), cancer.
- Art Gilmore, 98, American actor and voice actor, President of AFTRA (1961–1963), natural causes.
- Arne Isacsson, 93, Swedish painter.
- Delbert Lamb, 95, American Olympic speed skater (1936, 1948), Alzheimer's disease.
- Morrie McHugh, 93, New Zealand rugby union player (Auckland, national team).
- Zoltán Pálkovács, 29, Slovak Olympic judoka, traffic collision.
- James Stovall, 52, American stage actor.
- Sir Donald Tebbit, 90, British diplomat.
- Karlo Umek, 93, Slovenian Olympic shooter.

=== 26 ===
- Victor Calvo, 86, American politician, California State Assemblyman (1974–1980), Mayor of Mountain View, California, prostate cancer.
- Stanley Chais, 84, American investor involved in Madoff investment scandal, blood disorder.
- Johnny Edgecombe, 77, British jazz promoter, inadvertently alerted authorities to the Profumo affair, lung cancer.
- Stan Heath, 83, American football player (Green Bay Packers) and CFL player (Calgary Stampeders), throat cancer.
- Jimi Heselden, 62, British businessman, owner of Hesco Bastion and Segway, drove Segway off a cliff.
- Viktor Kalivoda, 33, Czech spree killer, suicide by stabbing.
- Reino Kangasmäki, 94, Finnish wrestler.
- Patrick Lee, 79, Canadian Anglican prelate, Bishop of Rupert's Land (1994–1999).
- Terry Newton, 31, British rugby league player, apparent suicide by hanging.
- Arjun Kumar Sengupta, 73, Indian politician.
- Gloria Stuart, 100, American film actress (The Invisible Man, Titanic, The Old Dark House), respiratory failure.

=== 27 ===
- Ernesto Álvarez, 82, Argentine and Chilean football player.
- Carmelo Arden Quin, 97, Uruguayan poet, painter and sculptor.
- George Blanda, 83, American Hall of Fame football player (Chicago Bears, Houston Oilers, Oakland Raiders).
- Dieudonné Cédor, 85, Haitian painter.
- Michael Gizzi, 61, American poet.
- Pierre Guffroy, 84, French film production designer and art director.
- Lê Sáng, 90, Vietnamese martial arts master, long illness.
- Ahmed Maher, 75, Egyptian politician, Minister of Foreign Affairs (2001–2004).
- Kenny Marino, 66, American actor (Death Wish 3, Prince of the City).
- Sally Menke, 56, American film editor (Inglourious Basterds, Kill Bill, Pulp Fiction), suspected heat exhaustion.
- Carlos Mercader, 87, Uruguayan Olympic modern pentathlete.
- Buddy Morrow, 91, American jazz musician and bandleader.
- Elliot Philipp, 95, British obstetrician and gynaecologist.
- Real Quiet, 15, American thoroughbred racehorse, winner of 1998 Kentucky Derby and Preakness Stakes, broken neck following a fall.
- Trevor Taylor, 73, British racing driver, cancer.
- Frank Turner, 87, British Olympic gymnast.
- Ed Wiley Jr., 80, American jazz and R&B saxophonist and singer, injury from a fall.

=== 28 ===
- Kurt Albert, 56, German climber, climbing accident.
- Muhammad Kazim Allahyar, Afghan politician, suicide attack.
- Lilia Amarfi, 60, Soviet and Russian operetta actress, after serious illness.
- Norman Atkins, 76, Canadian political strategist and politician, senator from Ontario (1986–2009).
- Orvin Cabrera, 33, Honduran footballer (national team), liver cancer.
- Héctor Croxatto, 102, Chilean scientist.
- John Daukom, 72/73, Malaysian Olympic sprinter.
- Sir Trevor Holdsworth, 83, British businessman.
- Arthur Penn, 88, American film director (Bonnie and Clyde, Little Big Man) and theatre director (The Miracle Worker), Tony winner (1960), heart failure.
- Józef Rubiś, 79, Polish Olympic skier.
- Gisèle Vallerey, 80, French Olympic swimmer.
- Dolores Wilson, 82, American opera singer, natural causes.
- Romina Yan, 36, Argentine actress (Chiquititas), cardiac arrest.
- Tadeusz Zagajewski, 97, Polish electronics engineer and scientist.

=== 29 ===
- Andy Albeck, 89, American film executive, President of United Artists (1978–1981), heart failure.
- Richard Abruzzo, 47, American balloonist.
- Georges Charpak, 86, Polish-born French physicist, Nobel laureate.
- Vincenzo Crocitti, 61, Italian actor (An Average Little Man).
- Tony Curtis, 85, American actor (Some Like It Hot, Spartacus, The Defiant Ones), cardiac arrest.
- Carol Rymer Davis, 65, American balloonist.
- Herm Fuetsch, 92, American basketball player (Baltimore Bullets).
- Greg Giraldo, 44, American comedian (Comedy Central Roast), accidental prescription drug overdose.
- Clifford B. Hicks, 90, American writer and editor (Popular Mechanics, Alvin Fernald series).
- Voki Kostić, 79, Serbian composer.
- Armindo Lopes Coelho, 78, Portuguese Roman Catholic prelate, Bishop of Porto (1997–2007).
- Sherman J. Maisel, 92, American government official, Federal Reserve governor, respiratory failure.
- Joe Mantell, 94, American character actor (Marty, Chinatown, The Twilight Zone), pneumonia.
- David Marques, 77, British rugby union player, cancer.
- Nick Nicholson, 84, American college football coach.
- Mary Rundle, 103, British government official, superintendent in the Women's Royal Naval Service.
- Rao Sikandar Iqbal, 67, Pakistani politician, Defense Minister (2002–2007).

=== 30 ===
- Mohamed Aden Sheikh, 73–74, Somali medical doctor and politician.
- Oscar Avogadro, 59, Italian lyricist.
- Stephen J. Cannell, 69, American television producer and writer (The A-Team, The Rockford Files, 21 Jump Street), complications from melanoma.
- Ed Henry, 89, American politician and academic, Mayor of St. Cloud, Minnesota (1964–1970).
- Martin Ljung, 93, Swedish actor and comedian.
- Sir Robert Mark, 93, British police officer, Commissioner of the Metropolitan Police (1972–1977).
- Aaron-Carl Ragland, 37, American electronic dance musician, lymphoma.
- Tor Richter, 72, Norwegian Olympic shooter.
- Joseph Sobran, 64, American political writer, diabetes.
- Tony Thibodeaux, 72, American cajun musician.
