= Argiris =

Argiris a given name and surname. People with the name include:

== Given name ==
- Argiris Papapetrou
- Argiris Kavidas
- Argiris Giannikis
- Argiris Koulouris
- Argiris Karaiannis
- Argiris Ser
- Argiris Kambouris
- Argiris Barettas
- Argiris Mitsou
- Argyris Pedoulakis

== Surname ==
- Aris Argiris
- Spiros Argiris
