= Hugh Clark =

Hugh Clark or Hugh Clarke may refer to:

- Hugh Clark (actor) (died 1653), English actor
- Hugh Archibald Clarke (1839–1927), Canadian organist, composer and teacher
- Hugh Clark (politician) (1867–1959), Canadian politician and newspaper editor
- Hugh Massey Clark (1886–1956), American philatelist and publisher
- Hugh V. Clarke (1919–1996), Australian military historian
- Hugh Clark (British Army officer) (1923–2010), British Army Second World War officer
