= Ivan Vukadinov =

Bulgarian painter (1932–2024)

- Иван Вукадинов
- Born: Ivan Vukadinov; 19 March 1932; Bulgaria
- Died: 22 September 2024 (aged 92)
- Occupation: Painter
- Known for: Painting, encaustics
- Notable work: In Memory of the Heroes (Памет за героите), Matter and Time cycle, Medieval Bulgaria cycle

Ivan Borisov Vukadinov (Bulgarian: Иван Борисов Вукадинов; 19 March 1932 – 22 September 2024) was a Bulgarian painter. Considered "one of the greatest of Bulgarian artists," he was one of the 25 artists selected for the monograph series published by the National Endowment of the Arts. Vukadinov resurrected an encaustic technique used in ancient Egypt for making Fayum mummy portraits. His art references Etruscan, Egyptian, Thracian, Greek, and Roman art. Vukadinov was the first Bulgarian artist whose work has been acquired by the Vatican Museums.

== Career ==
Vukadinov originally trained in plein-air landscapes and still-life paintings, but his style soon changed to a minimalism of expression, dense colouration and a figurative constructivist approach to explore the influences of the past on present consciousness and national aesthetics.

Following an exhibition in Rome, the purchase of two paintings by the Vatican was blocked by the Bulgarian government on the grounds that Vukadinov paintings are "a National treasure". He was honoured by the city of Pisa, which presented him with the Key to the City of Pisa.

He was the subject of books published by the National Art Gallery, Bulgaria in 1978 and by the National Endowment for the Arts in 2015, which said of his work: "By incorporating the fourth dimension in his pictures — that of time — the artist transforms spatial dynamics into flat statics through which his works elicit a sense of timelessness, linking him with both Egyptian aesthetics and mediaeval symbolism." In his painting cycles Matter and Time I and II, Vukadinov used the motifs of the Egyptian mirror and of Coptic or Maya textiles to express spiritual values.

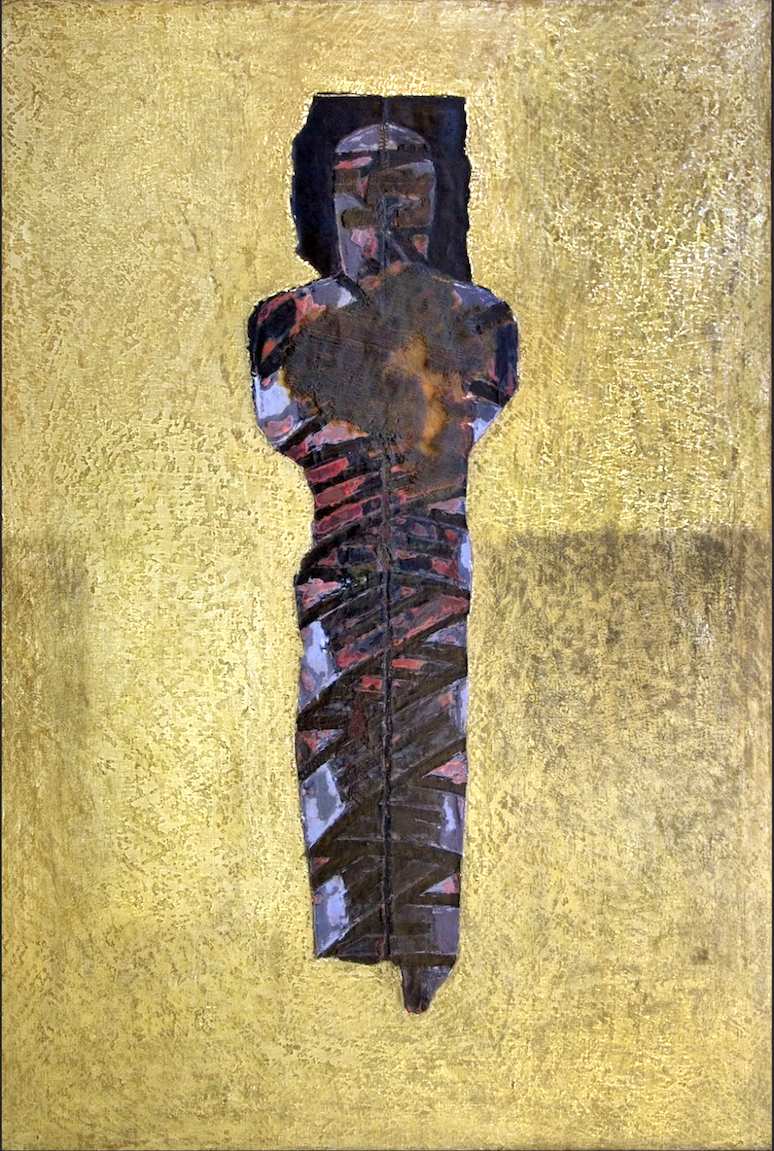
"In Memory of the Heroes" by Ivan Vukadinov

=== "In Memory of the Heroes" and the Vatican Museums ===
==== Background ====
The journey of Vukadinov's renowned painting "In Memory of the Heroes," culminated in its acquisition by the Vatican Museums.

Painted in 1973, the artwork garnered acclaim during an art exhibition held in Rome during the mid-1970s. The exhibition was housed by Galleria Marguttina 51, situated in the art-centred Via Margutta, where artists and celebrities, such as Federico Fellini resided. Impressed by Vukadinov's artwork, the Vatican Museums expressed interest to acquire it as an inaugural piece for the opening of the Collection of Modern and Contemporary Art, Vatican Museums. However, the Bulgarian government at the time vetoed the offer, asserting that the work held the status of a "national treasure," rendering it unattainable for purchase.

The artist, deeply disappointed by the refusal, made a vow to never exhibit his works in Bulgaria again. It wasn't until 2006, that Vukadinov returned to the artistic scene in Sofia, with exhibitions at Gallery Rakursi.

==== Acquisition by the Vatican Museums ====
In October 2022, after nearly 50 years, In Memory of the Heroes was placed in the Vatican Museums, with the support of the Bulgarian state. Vukadinov's painting thus became the first work by a Bulgarian artist to enter the Vatican Museums. The art historian and director of the Vatican Museums, Barbara Jatta, said that this represented "an important moment in the relations between the Holy See and Bulgaria... Certainly, the message of Vukadinov's work is strong, bright, in which the sacred shines through; a message about art and faith". Micol Forti, director of the Collection of Contemporary Art since 2000, described the painting as "a work with a view beyond the visible."

The significance of Vukadinov's painting ties into Pope Paul VI's vision for the artists in the Vatican Collection of contemporary art, "regardless of their personal faith, the important thing is that their artwork can testify to a glimpse of what is beyond the visible," in the words of Micol Forti:

Especially the painting by Ivan Vukadinov, which is included in the collections of the Vatican Museums, is a very interesting example of precisely this look beyond the visible. Through the title he offers to his painting in memory of the heroes and through a synthetic form of a human figure that stands out against the golden background, he offers a deep reflection on some important themes: the theme of memory of identity, of the value of the individual in the community and the topic of transversal culture. These characters have no name, no origin, we are not told who they are. Everyone has their reference character, that is, their roots, they represent the roots of our essence. This is perhaps the most important message within the collection of modern and contemporary art in the Vatican Museums, which is transversal in era, geography and origin, but which seeks to document the spiritual and transcendental aspect of artist's research.

==== Philatelic stamp dedicated to Vukadinov and his painting "In Memory of Heroes" ====
The Bulgarian government honored Vukadinov by issuing a special postal-philatelic commemorative stamp in 2022, which features his painting "In Memory of Heroes" and pays tribute to Vukadinov's artwork becoming part of the Vatican Museums' collection. The Bulgarian Ministry of Culture organized a ceremony to validate and launch the stamp, coinciding with the artist's 90th birthday celebration. The stamp was designed by Stoyan Dechev.

==== Vatican Museums: Celebration of the first 50 years of the Collection of Modern and Contemporary Art (1973–2023) ====
Vukadinov's painting was chosen as one of the ten artworks showcased in the special exhibition across the Vatican Museums, commemorating the significant milestone for the institution in 2023.

== Biography ==
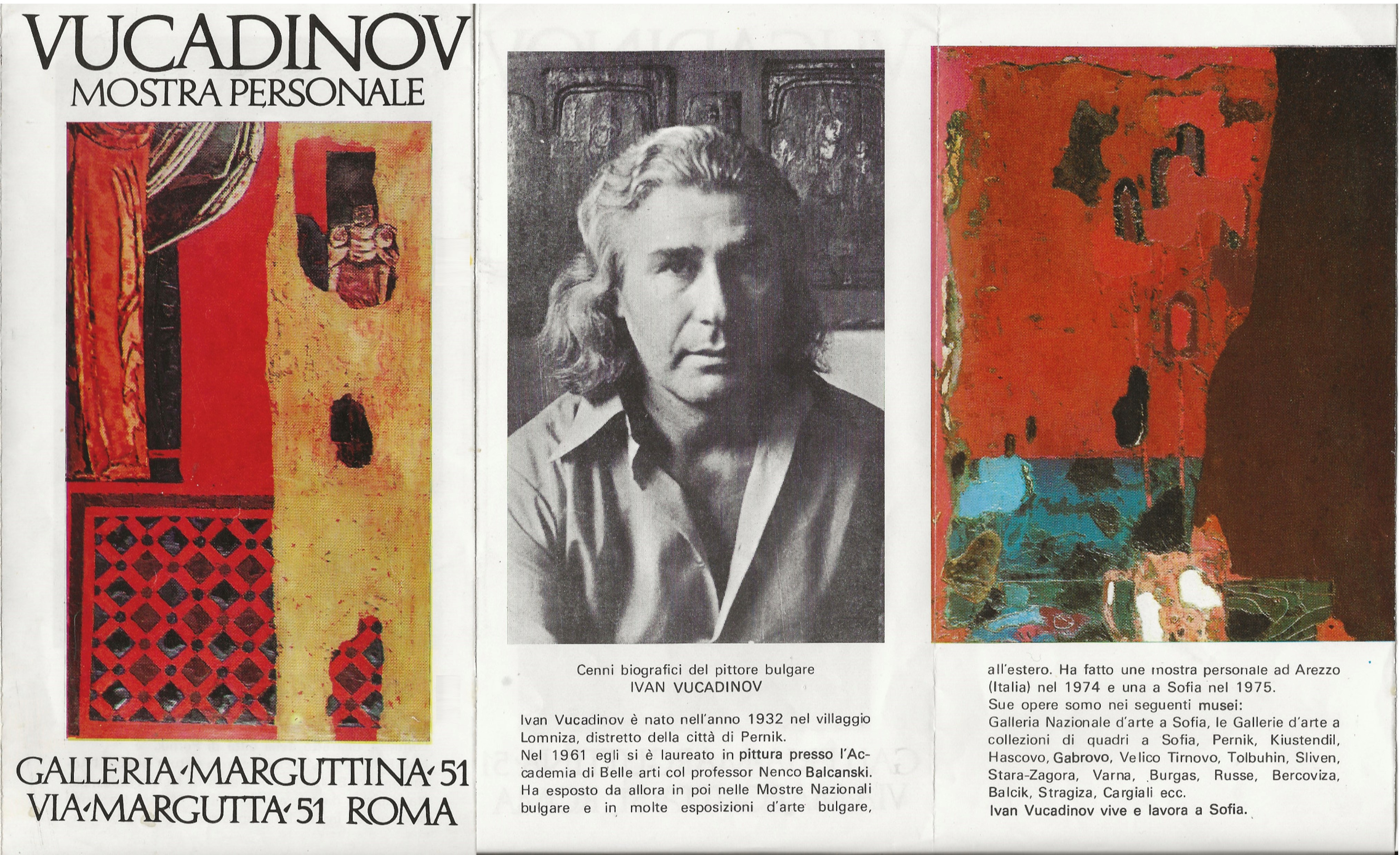
Mostra personale for Ivan Vukadinov's exhibition at Galleria Marguttina 51, Roma in 1975.

Vukadinov trained at the National Academy of Art in Sofia as a student of Nenko Balkanski (1961–1964). By 1963 his work was shown in group art exhibitions in Bulgaria, and internationally in Russia, Latvia, France, England, Italy, and Austria. He had solo exhibitions at Rakovski 125 Gallery, in Sofia, now 'Rajko Aleksiev', and at Margutina Gallery in Rome in 1975. These were followed by joint exhibitions with Olga Belopitova in 1977–1978 at the Museum of Fine Arts in Grosseto, the Palazzo Gambacorti in Pisa, and Haus Wittgenstein in Vienna. He also had two exhibitions at Rakovski 125 Gallery, one in 1980 and an annual exhibition from 2006 to 2014 with Ivan Kirkov and Ivan Milev. Vukadinov lived in Sofia.

Vukadinov and his art have been recognized by the highest honorary award bestowed by the Ministry of Culture of Bulgaria, The Golden Age ("Златен Век) in 2022, The Golden Feather ("Златно Перо") for his "indisputable contribution to Bulgarian culture and art" (2021), and others.

Vukadinov died on September 22, 2024, Bulgaria's Independence Day, at the age of 92.

== Selected works ==
- Portrait of Juliana (1960)
- Knight’s Move (1970)
- Interior with Etruscan Hunting Dog (1970)
- In Memory of Heroes (1971)
- Sugar Factory (1976)
- Stone Walls (1976)
- Blue Fish (1980)
- Golden Chess (1980)
- Matter and Time cycle (1976–1980)
- Mediaeval Bulgaria cycle (1976–1979)
- Earth Fault (1990)
- Harvest (~2005)
