= Edward Henry (disambiguation) =

Edward Henry (1850–1931) was a British police commissioner.

Edward Henry may also refer to:

- Edward Lamson Henry (1841–1919), American genre painter
- Ed Henry, White House correspondent for Fox News Channel
- Ed Henry (Alabama politician), member of the Alabama House of Representatives
- Ed Henry (Minnesota politician) (1921–2010), American Democratic politician and academic
- E. Stevens Henry (1836–1921), U.S. Representative from Connecticut

== See also ==
- Henry (surname)
