= University of Central Arkansas =

Public university in Conway, Arkansas, US

- Former names: Arkansas State Normal School (1907–1925); Arkansas State Teachers College (1925–1967); State College of Arkansas (1967–1975)
- Motto: Go here. Go anywhere.
- Type: Public university
- Established: 1907; 119 years ago
- Academic affiliations: Space-grant
- Endowment: $68.6 million (2025)
- President: Houston Davis
- Provost: Michael Hargis
- Students: 9,962 (Fall 2025)
- Undergraduates: 8,238 (Fall 2025)
- Postgraduates: 1,724 (Fall 2025)
- Location: Conway, Arkansas, U.S. 35.077°N 92.457°W
- Campus: Suburban, 356 acres (1.44 km^{2})
- Colors: Purple & gray
- Nickname: Bears & Sugar Bears
- Sporting affiliations: NCAA Division I – ASUN; UAC
- Mascot: Bruce D. Bear
- Website: www.uca.edu

The University of Central Arkansas (Central Arkansas or UCA) is a public university in Conway, Arkansas, United States. Founded in 1907, the university is one of the oldest in the state. As the state's only normal school at the time, UCA has historically been the primary source of teachers in Arkansas. It was one of about 180 "normal schools" founded by state governments to train teachers for the rapidly growing public common schools.

The university comprises five colleges, five residential colleges and one commuter college. UCA has about 10,000 graduate and undergraduate students, making it one of the largest universities in the state. The university maintains a student-to-faculty ratio of approximately 17 to 1. Over 150 undergraduate, graduate, and professional programs are offered at the university. UCA occupies over 120 buildings within its 356 acres (1.44 km^{2}).

== History ==
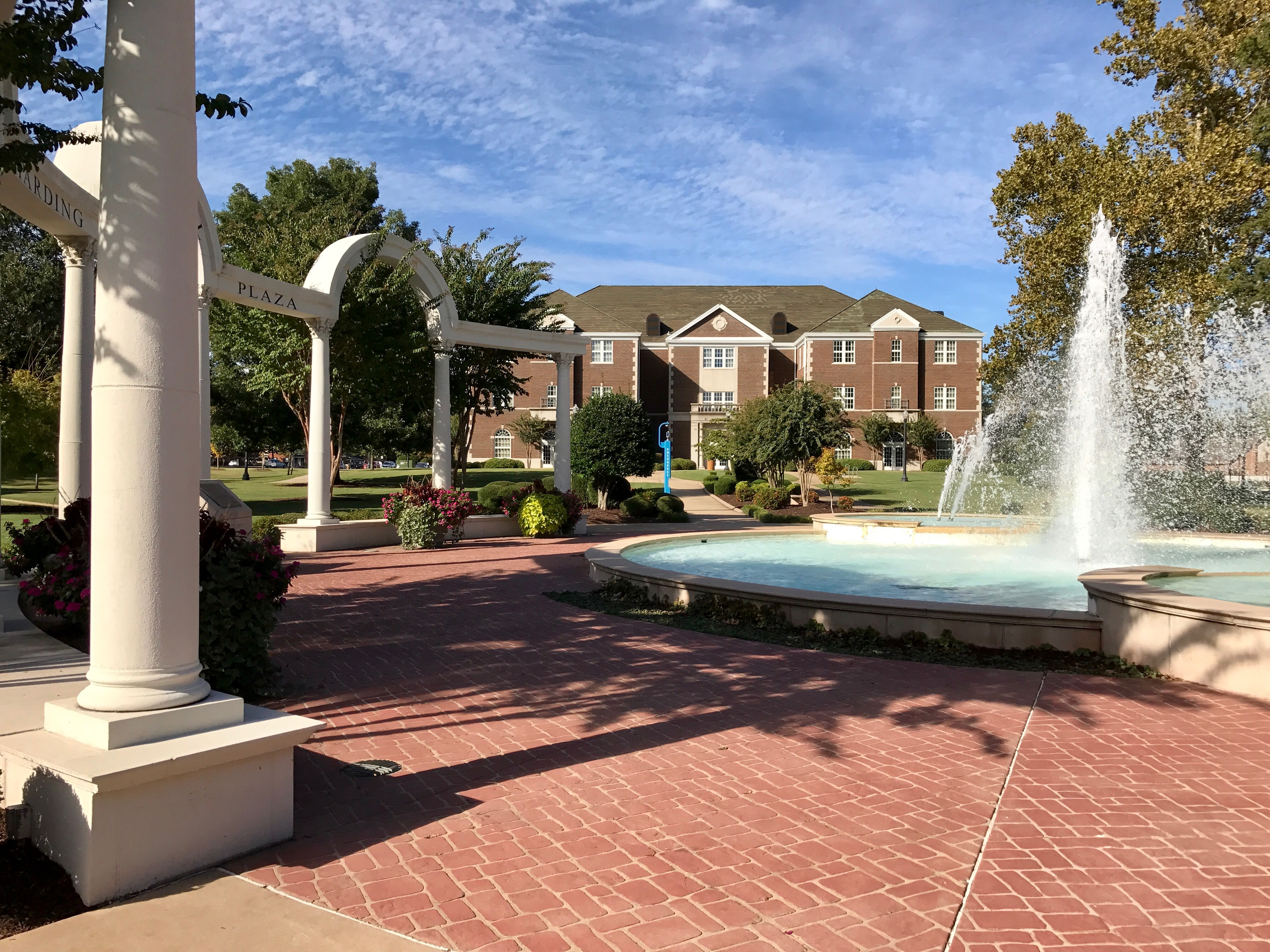
Harding Plaza in front of Irby Hall

The Arkansas State Legislature created the Arkansas State Normal School, now known as the University of Central Arkansas, in 1907 by passage of Act 317 on May 14. The purpose of The Arkansas State Normal School was to properly train students to become professional teachers and centralize teacher training. Classes began September 21, 1908, with nine academic departments, one building on 80 acres (320,000 m^{2}), 107 students and seven faculty members. Two faculty members taught in two departments and President Doyne taught pedagogy and Latin.

In 1925, Arkansas State Normal School became Arkansas State Teachers College. The name change more accurately reflected the primary focus of instruction and mission of the institution.

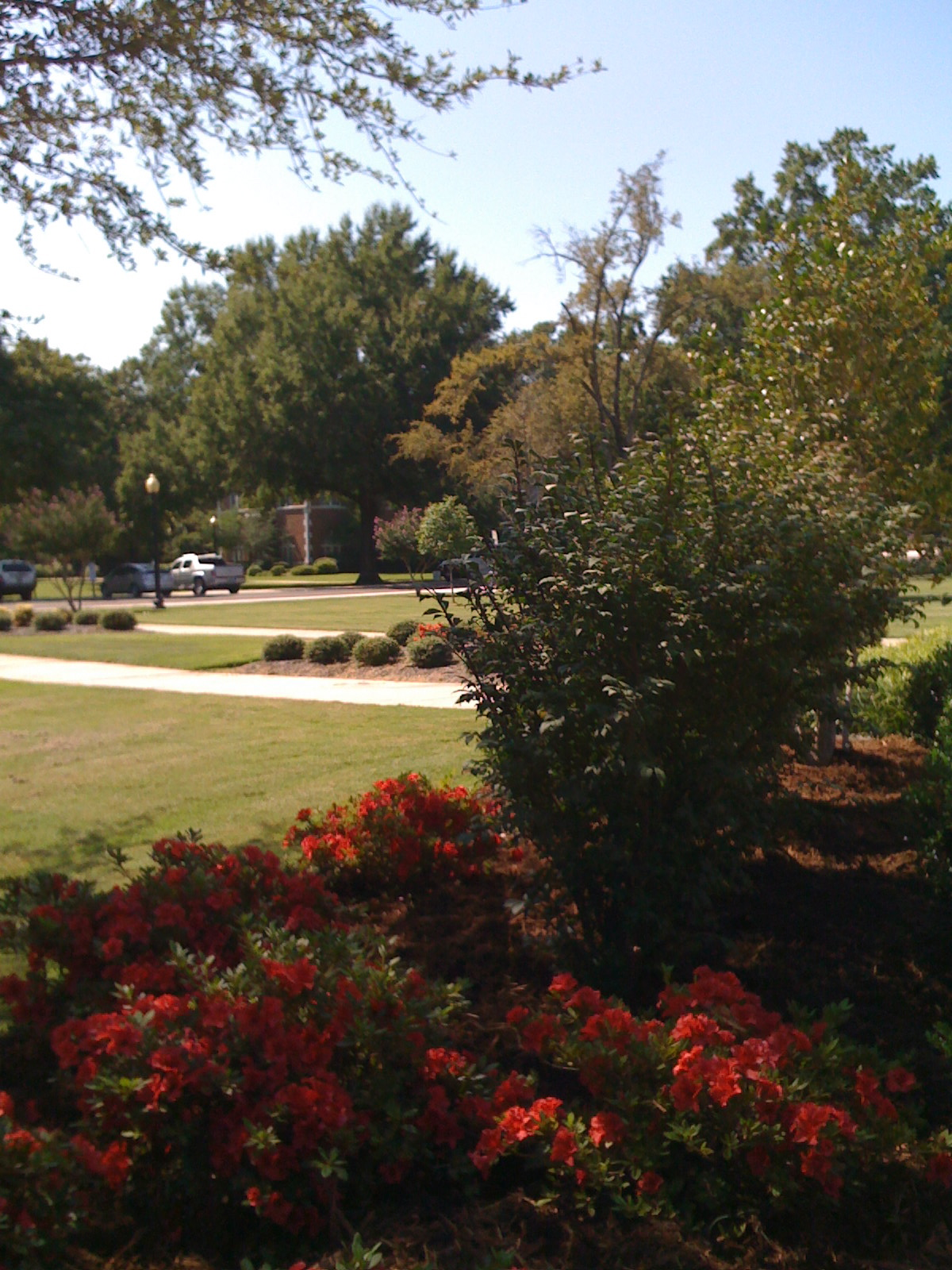
Flowers looking towards the south, central part of campus

By 1967, the mission of Arkansas State Teachers College had changed. Though teacher training was still an important part of the school's mission, other fields began to expand in liberal arts studies and in the emerging field of health care. To recognize the institution's existing academic diversity another name change was in order. In January 1967, Arkansas State Teachers College became the State College of Arkansas.

President Silas Snow, who championed the name change in 1967, organized State College of Arkansas along university lines in preparation for still yet another name change. State College of Arkansas grew rapidly and offered an ever-widening range of degree programs. By January 1975, Snow's efforts were realized as the State Department of Higher Education recommended State College of Arkansas be known as The University of Central Arkansas, or UCA.

=== Presidents ===
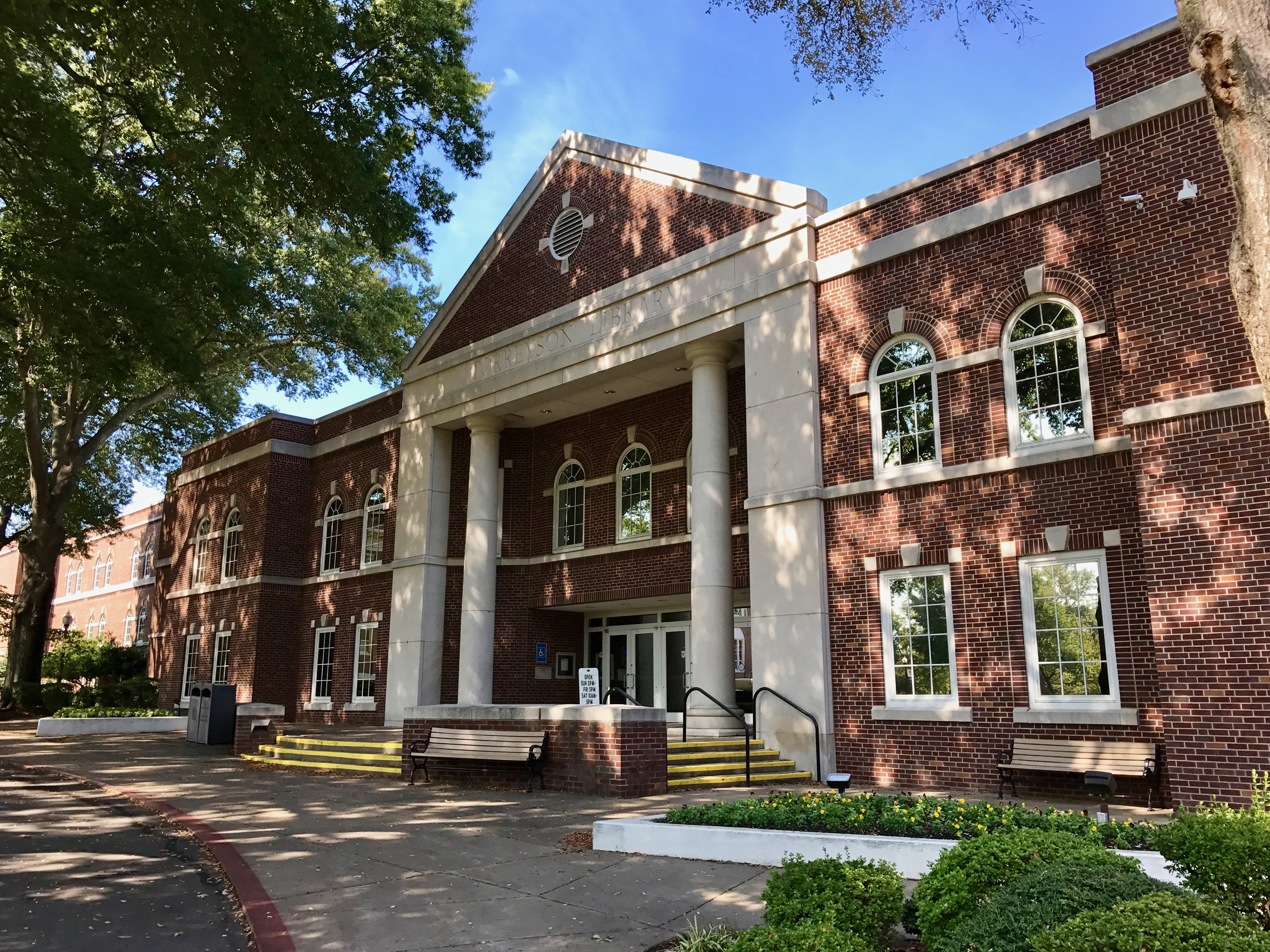
Torreyson Library, named after Burr Walter Torreyson

- John James Doyne (1908–1917)
- Burr Walter Torreyson (1917–1930)
- Heber L. McAlister (1930–1941)
- Nolen M. Irby (1941–1953)
- Silas D. Snow (1953–1975)
- Jefferson D. Farris (1975–1986)
- Winfred L. Thompson (1988–2001)
- Lu Hardin (2002–2008)
- Allen Meadors (2009–2011)
- Tom Courtway (2011–2016)
- Houston Davis (2017– )

== Enrollment ==
As of fall 2016, UCA had an enrollment of 11,487 students. Enrollment was 11,754 in 2015 and 11,698 in 2014. Retention for full-time, first-time undergraduates increased from 72.4 percent in fall 2014 to 72.9 percent in fall 2015. Graduate student enrollment was 1,872, while last year the number was 1,867, and the number of transfer students increased to 775 compared to 618 last year.

== Traditions ==
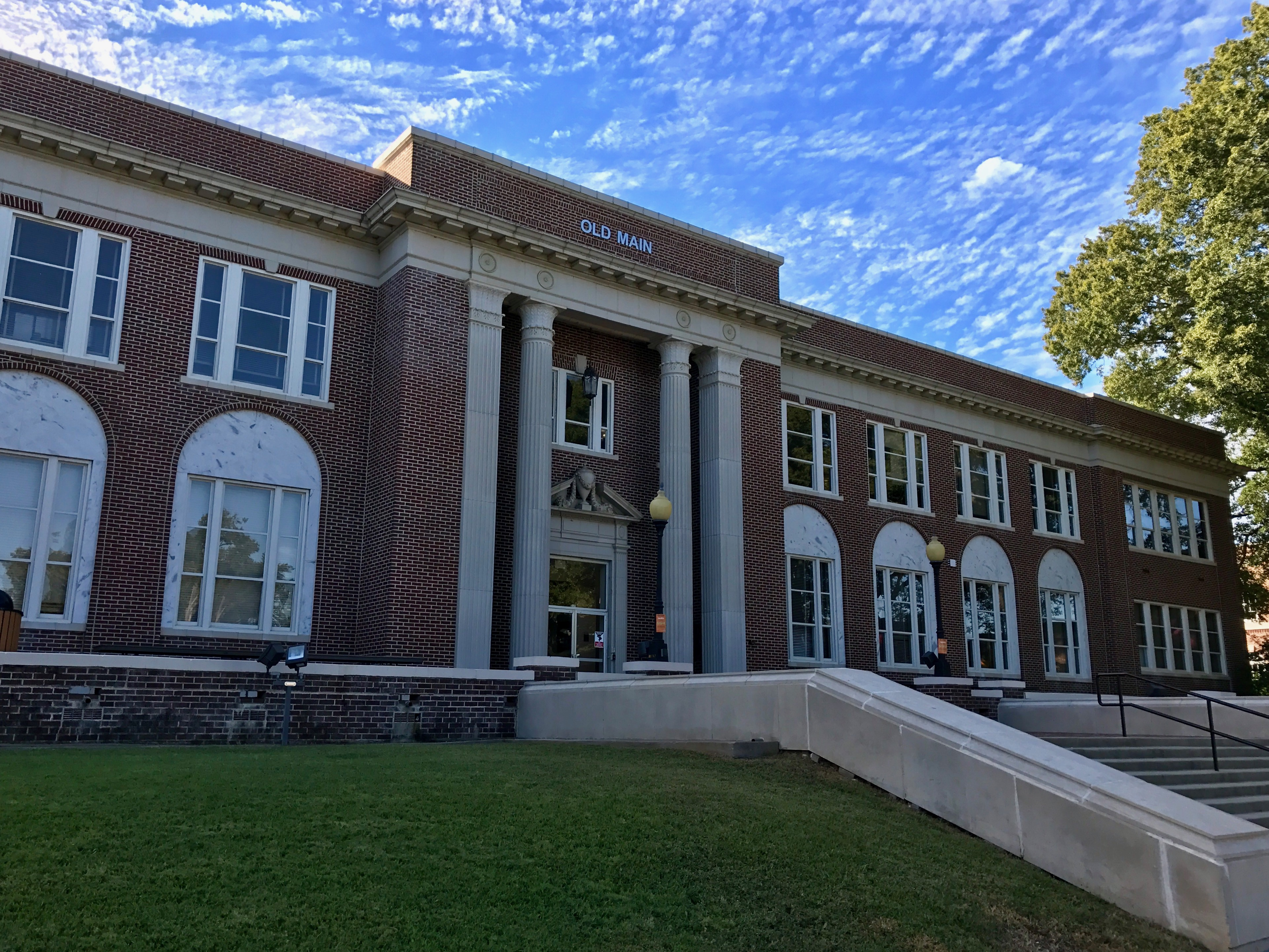
Main Hall, the oldest building on campus

=== Colors ===
The colors for UCA were decided the first year and according to an article in the November 24, 1908, edition of the Log Cabin Democrat, were said to be purple and silver. President Doyne assigned the task of developing school colors to W.O. Wilson and Ida Waldran in 1908. Wilson was wearing a gray sweater and Waldran was wearing a purple scarf. They chose the colors based upon the color of the clothing they were wearing that day. Both Wilson and Waldran thought that purple and gray complemented each other. Today the official colors for all UCA sports teams are purple and gray.

=== Mascot ===
The UCA athletic teams first had a mascot in 1920. According to Dr. Ted Worley, author of A History of The Arkansas State Teachers College, the UCA teams from 1908 to 1919 were referred to by many names, including: Tutors, Teachers, Pedagogues, Pea-Pickers, and Normalites. In 1920, the Bears became the mascot for the teams. However, the teams were called the "Bears" in print until April 7, 1921. Dr. Worley also quoted sources as saying the Bear was an appropriate symbol for the school because Arkansas' nickname was the "Bear State". The women's teams were known as the Bearettes for several years. The name of Sugar Bear came later. Victor E. Bear came about in 1999 and Victoria E. Bear came soon after. Bruce D. Bear became the newest addition to the UCA family in 2006.

=== Old Main ===
UCA's Old Main is the oldest building on campus. This building was completed in 1919 and was built by George Donaghey, the man for whom Donaghey Avenue is named and a former governor of the State of Arkansas. After the building was built it served a dual role as the administration building and as a classroom building. It continued to serve as the administration building until the 1960s. On February 11, 2011, the building was named on the National Register of Historic Places.

=== World War II Marker ===
UCA's World War II Memorial was dedicated in October 2003. The memorial contains the names and branch of service of forty-six UCA alumni who were killed during World War II. The memorial is seen as a permanent reminder of those UCA alumni who lost their lives during the conflict.

=== 2008 shooting ===
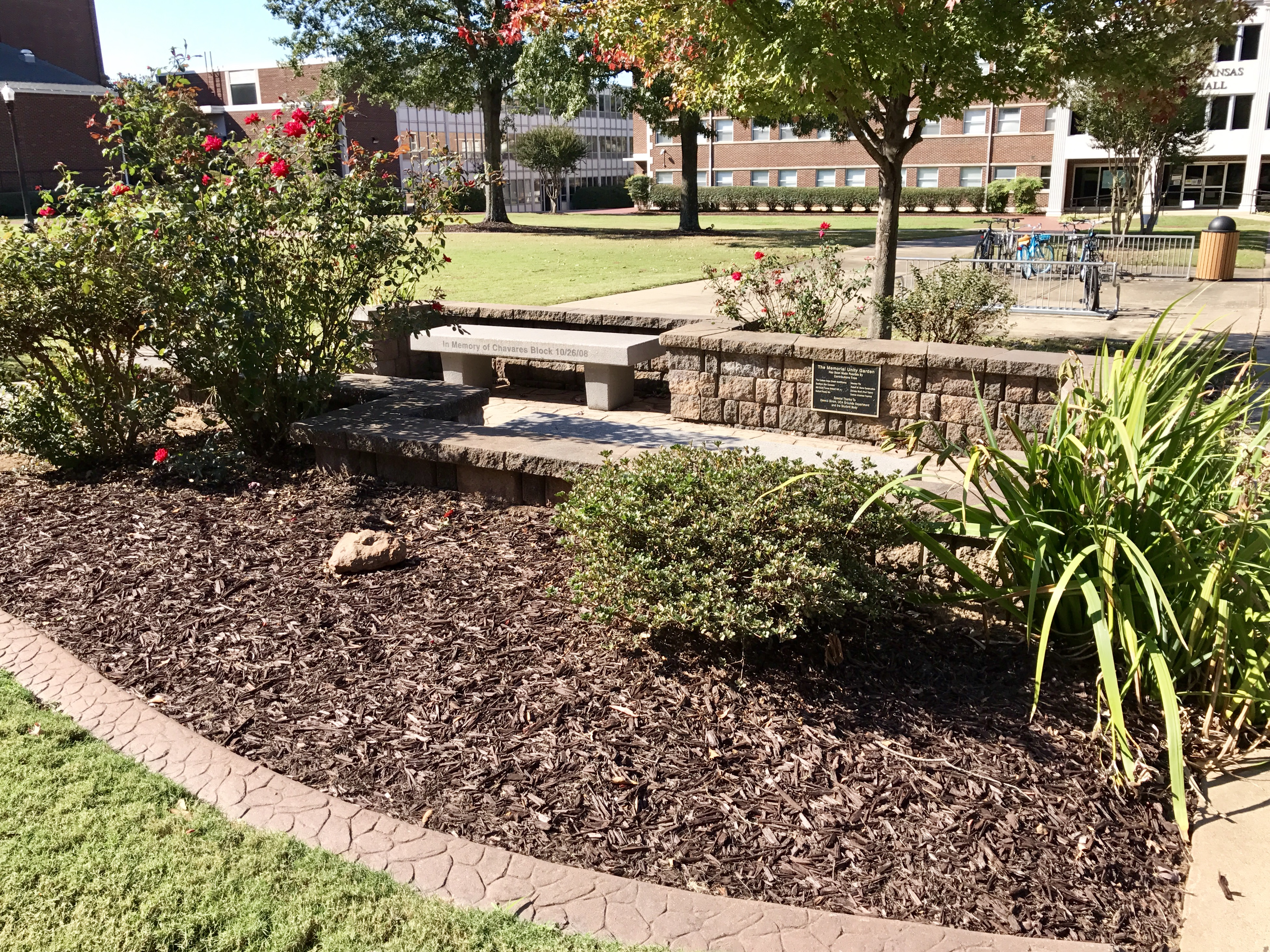
Memorial Unity Garden in front of Arkansas Hall honoring the victims

On Sunday, October 26, 2008, a shooting took place on the UCA campus shortly after 9:00pm CDT. Two students were fatally shot. A third person, a non-student visiting the campus, was shot in the leg and treated at the nearby Conway Regional Medical Center. UCA Police Department arrested four suspects in the shooting. All four subsequently pleaded guilty.

=== Senior Legacy Walk Brick Campaign ===
The Senior Walk is located in the courtyard in front of the Student Center. Each year, graduates will have the opportunity to purchase bricks as part of their class year. For $100, graduates can purchase a brick that will be inscribed with his/her name or the name of a graduate that a purchaser wants to honor.

== Academics and rankings ==
Undergraduate demographics as of Fall 2023
Race and ethnicity	Total
White	65%
Black	17%
Hispanic	8%
Two or more races	5%
International student	3%
Asian	2%
Economic diversity
Low-income (Note: The percentage of students who received an income-based federal Pell grant intended for low-income students.)	39%
Affluent (Note: The percentage of students who are a part of the American middle class at the bare minimum.)	61%

Academic rankings

National
- U.S. News & World Report: 377 (tie)

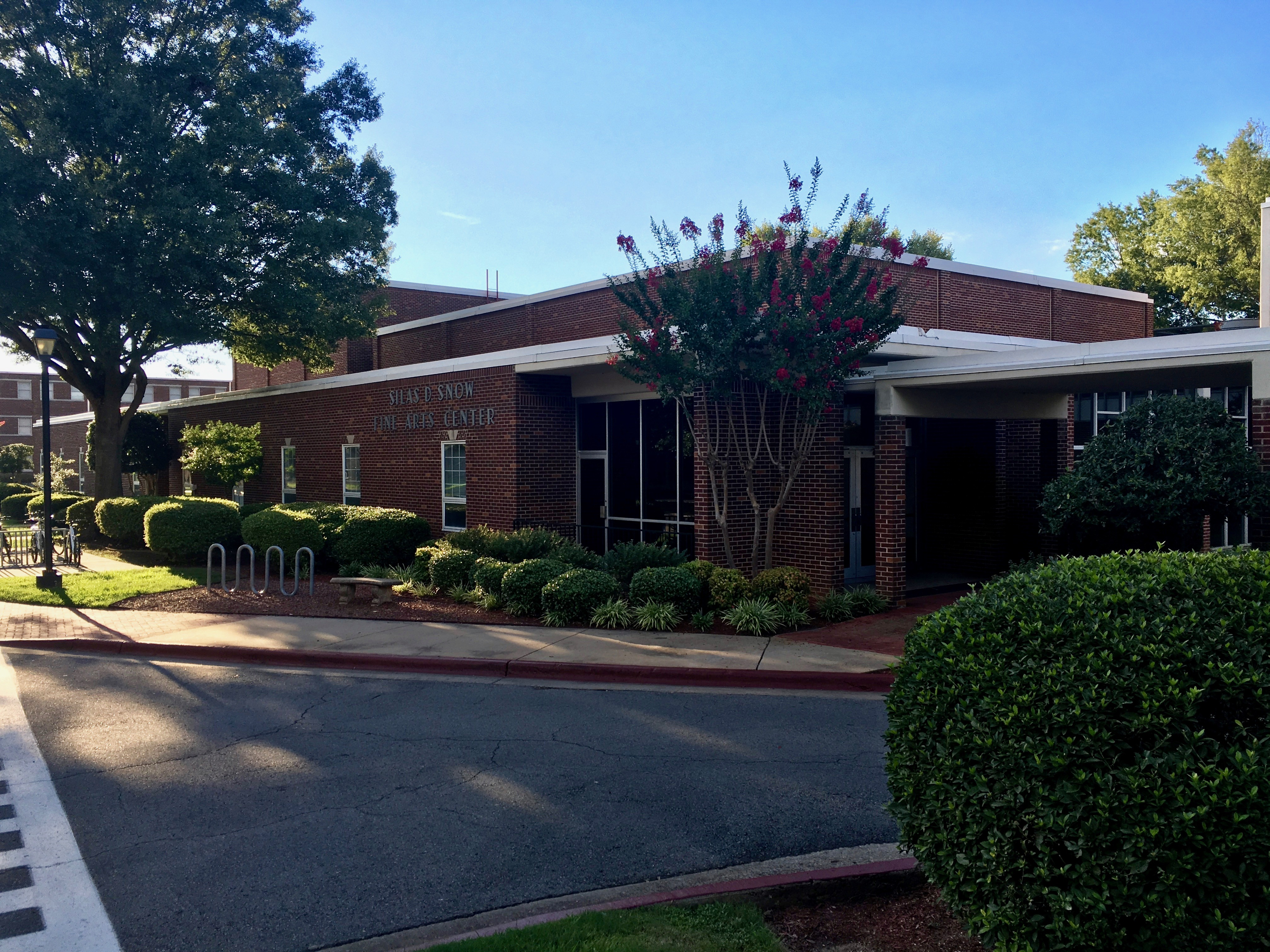
Snow Fine Arts Center

The university has six distinct colleges offering nearly 150 majors. These colleges are the College of Arts, Humanities, and Social Sciences, College of Business, the College of Education, the College of Health and Behavioral Sciences, the College of Science and Engineering, and the Graduate School.

In January 2010, UCA mass-communication students launched The Fountain (later, The Fountain Magazine), a daily source of news and information. The student-created website is named "The Fountain" after the historic landmark located on the university's campus. The Fountain merged with The Echo, UCA's oldest student media outlet, in January 2014 to combine print and online resources. The Fountain Magazine was created following the merger.

== Colleges ==
The University of Central Arkansas in Conway, Arkansas, comprises six colleges. In addition to the programs offered at the colleges, it has a study abroad program. Students may, for example, study literature in Italy and the UK, healthcare in China, or sociology in Africa. Credits earned at several foreign universities may be credited toward a degree at UCA. The Arkansas Department of Higher Education also recognizes UCA as one of the nation's 20 Asian Studies Development Program Regional Centers for Asian Studies, a joint program of the federally funded East West Center and the University of Hawaii at Manoa.

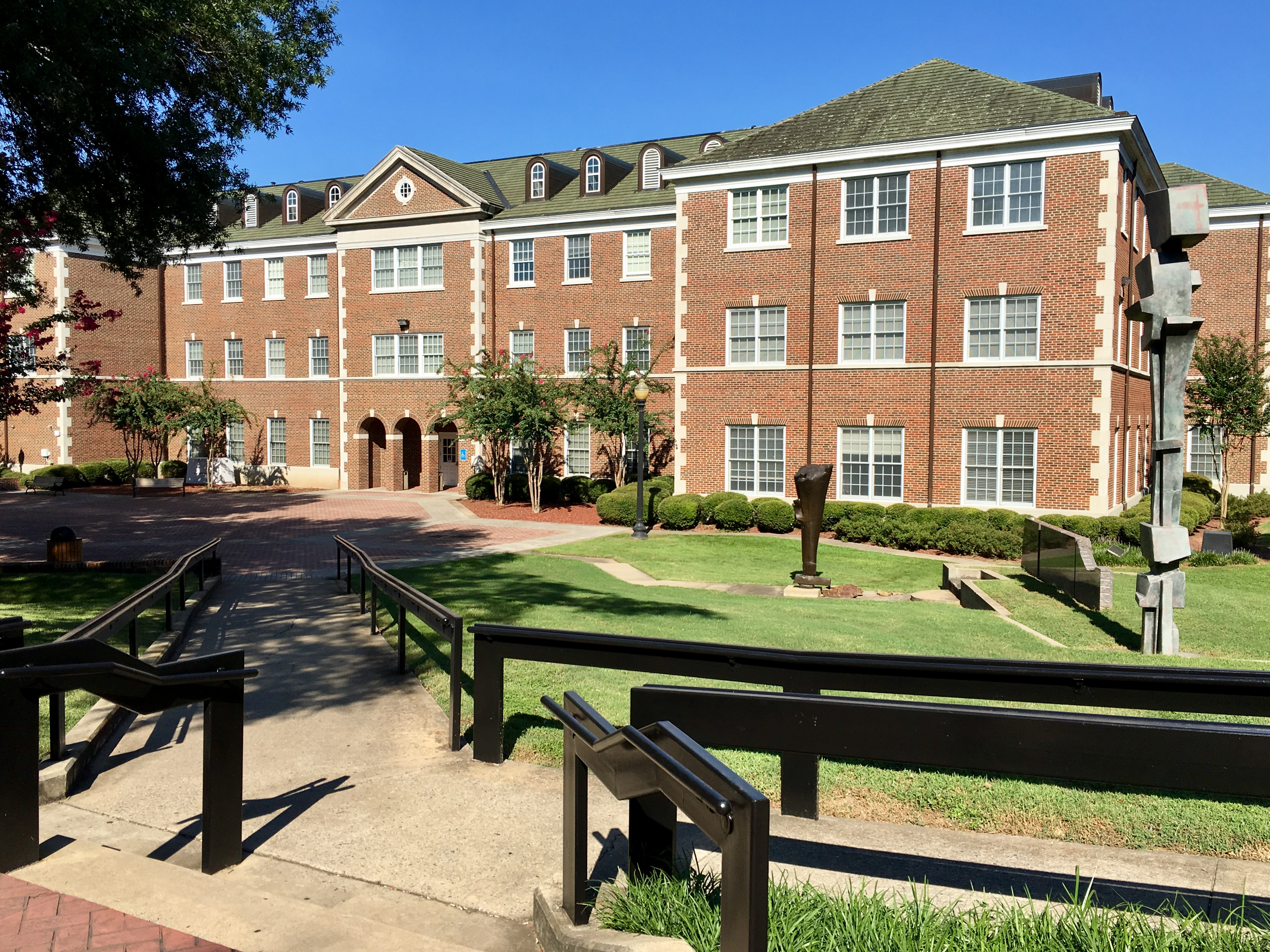
The courtyard behind Irby Hall

=== College of Fine Arts and Communication ===
The College of Fine Arts and Communication offers five degree fields of study. Many of the college's degrees enable graduates to work or teach in their chosen profession. The college offers both bachelor's and graduate programs.

=== College of Science and Engineering ===
This college offers eleven fields of study in the natural sciences, engineering, and mathematics, as well as six pre-professional programs. The college includes UCA STEMteach, a UTeach replication program. The college offers both bachelor's and master's degrees.

=== College of Business ===
Business students attending the University of Central Arkansas can pursue an associate, bachelor's, or graduate degree through this college.

=== College of Health and Behavioral Sciences ===
This college offers bachelor's and graduate degrees. ROTC students at the University of Central Arkansas attend this college for training as a commissioned officer.

=== College of Arts, Humanities, and Social Sciences ===
There are multiple fields of study available within the College of Liberal Arts. The college offers graduate and bachelor's degrees.

== Drama and theatre arts ==
The University of Central Arkansas participates annually in the Kennedy Center American College Theatre Festival. UCA also holds the annual Arkansas High School Audition Day which is a chance for any High School senior interested in majoring in theater to audition before most of the theatre programs in the state of Arkansas. UCA Theatre is accredited by the National Association of Schools of Theatre.

== Public Appearances ==
UCA Public Appearances is a division of the university's College of Fine Arts & Communication. Its primary responsibilities are to manage the Donald W. Reynolds Performance Hall—a 1,200-seat, state-of-the-art theater—and to develop and present performing arts programming in the hall.

The Reynolds Performance Hall opened on September 15, 2000, with a sold-out concert by the late Ray Charles. Since then, the theater has hosted numerous celebrities, including Loretta Lynn, Rhonda Vincent, Seth Meyers, Gavin DeGraw, the Temptations, Gladys Knight, Ronan Tynan, The Golden Dragon Acrobats, Frankie Valli & the Four Seasons, mezzo-soprano Denyce Graves, Dallas Cowboys owner Jerry Jones, local composer David William Allison, and many national and international touring companies.

UCA Public Appearances manages UCA Ticket Central, which provides ticketing services for all non-athletic ticketed events on the campus. UCA Ticket Central serves Public Appearances, UCA Theatre, the Conway Symphony Orchestra, the Arkansas Shakespeare Theatre, Student Activities events, and events sponsored by organizations within and outside the university.

== Athletics ==
The university's athletic teams are known as the Bears for men's teams and Sugar Bears for women's teams. Central Arkansas participates in the NCAA at the Division I (Football Championship Subdivision football) level. On July 1, 2021, UCA left the Southland Conference to join the ASUN Conference. UCA is a member of the United Athletic Conference for football only, competing in a partnership between the Athletic Sun and Western Athletic Conference.

UCA fields 19 varsity sports involving over 450 student-athletes. The athletic program includes eight men's sports: baseball, basketball, cross country, football, golf, soccer, and track and field; and 11 women's sports: basketball, cross country, golf, soccer, softball, tennis, track & field, volleyball, STUNT and beach volleyball.

== Greek life ==
UCA Greek life students are members of one of the 29 Greek organizations hosted by the campus. Greek life was established in 1915.

== Student Government Association ==
The Student Government Association, SGA, represents the student body at all times and in all circumstances, in areas such as: allocating and administrating student activity funds; advising the administration in regard to student-related policies; cooperating with faculty in determining student obligations and honors; considering all student petitions to SGA; planning and supervising all SGA elections; and approving charters or cancellations of RSOs.

== University of Central Arkansas Press (1985–1996) ==
The university established its own academic publishing imprint in 1985. It published 23 books by 1996, when university president Winfred L. Thompson closed the press, citing fiscal considerations.

== Notable alumni ==
- Dale Alford, ophthalmologist and politician
- Kris Allen, singer and American Idol winner
- Nate Bowie, professional basketballer and UCA single-game scoring record-holder with 39 points in a single game
- James Bridges, actor, director, and playwright famous for films such as The China Syndrome and The Paper Chase (film)
- Dee Brown, author of Bury My Heart at Wounded Knee
- Dave Burnette, former NFL player
- Joey L. Carr, American politician
- Curtis Burrow, former NFL player
- Monte Coleman, former NFL player
- Willie Davis, former NFL player
- James Dickey, basketball college coach
- Jimmy Driftwood, born James Corbitt Morris, songwriter/musician
- Joe Farrer, physical therapist and member of the Arkansas House of Representatives
- Jacob Ford, former NFL player
- Wes Gardner, former MLB player
- Gil Gerard, actor
- William Harrison (1935–2010), obstetrician who performed over 20,000 abortions as the only provider in Northwest Arkansas.
- Bob Johnson, member of the Arkansas House of Representatives for Pulaski County since 2015; former justice of the peace
- Julia Koch, president of David H. Koch Foundation and one of the richest women in the world
- Benjamin Travis Laney, 33rd Governor of Arkansas
- Sheffield Nelson, lawyer and Republican candidate for governor of Arkansas in 1990, obtained degree in mathematics education from Central Arkansas.
- Hiroyuki Nishimura, (attended for one year), founder and former administrator of the most accessed Japanese message board site 2channel; owner of notable imageboard 4chan
- Mike Norvell, head football coach Florida State University
- Russ Pennell, basketball college coach
- Scottie Pippen, Basketball Hall of Famer and 6 x NBA Champion
- Carol Rasco, MS 1972, Director of the Domestic Policy Council under President Bill Clinton; advocate for disability rights, education, and children
- Marvin Speight, basketball college coach
- Trey Steimel, member of the Alabama House of Representatives
- Gavin Stone, MLB pitcher for the Los Angeles Dodgers
- Charlie Strong, co -defensive coordinator University of Miami
- Cody Wilson, weapons developer and founder of Defense Distributed
- Shawn Womack, former member of both houses of the Arkansas State Legislature; circuit judge in Arkansas' 14th Judicial District; resident of Mountain Home
