= Muhammad Kazim Allahyar =

Afghan politician

Muhammad Kazim Allahyar محمدکاظم الله‌یار
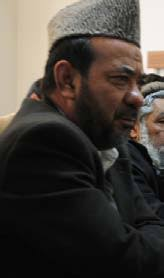

Deputy governor
- In office July 2005 – 28 September 2010

Personal details
- Born: 1955 Turkan, Jaghatu district, Ghazni province
- Died: 28 September 2010 (aged 54–55) Ghazni city
- Occupation: Politician
- Ethnicity: Hazaras

Muhammad Kazim Allahyar (Persian: محمدکاظم الله‌یار) was an ethnic Hazara politician, who served as Deputy governor of Ghazni province in Afghanistan, appointed in July 2005. He was killed in a suicide attack by the Taliban on 28 September 2010 in Ghazni city with his son, nephew, driver and three guards.

== Early life ==
Muhammad Kazim Allahyar, an ethnic Hazara, was born in 1955 in Turkan, Jaghatu district, Ghazni province, Afghanistan.
