= Steering-wheel lock =

Automotive theft-deterrent system

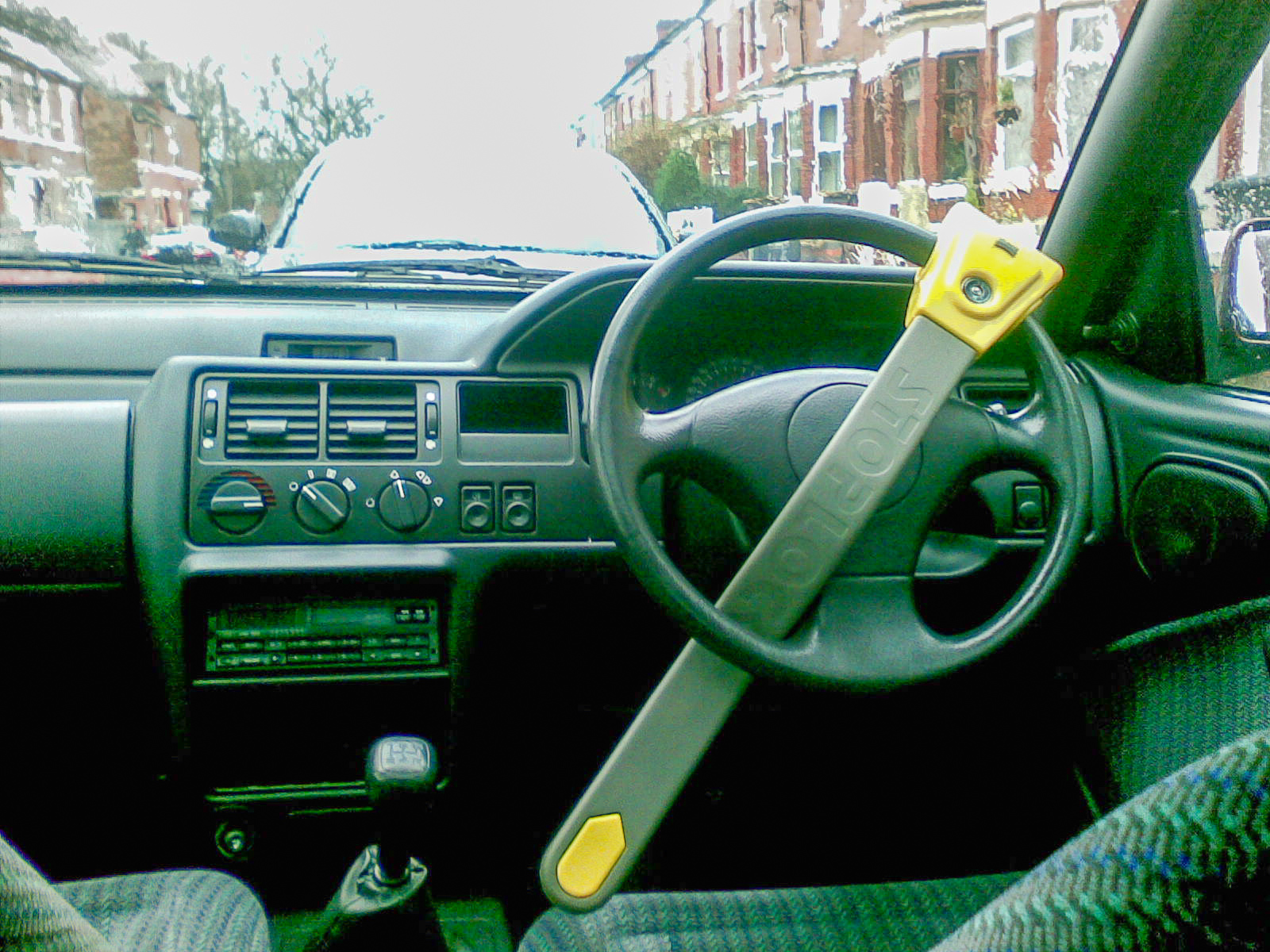
A steering-wheel lock is a visible anti-theft device.

A steering-wheel lock is a visible anti-theft device that immobilizes the steering wheel of a car.

Also known as a crook lock, or club lock, the first generation of steering-wheel locks, known as canes, consisted of a lockable bar that connected the steering wheel to the brake pedal or clutch pedal. Later models include devices which lock across the steering wheel and extend out over the dashboard preventing the steering wheel from being turned.

Wheel-locks have been used since at least the early 1920s, when many cars were open touring cars and roadsters (later known as convertibles). The Official Gazette of the United States Patent Office published details of patents filed in 1916.

Steering wheel locks can be defeated by cutting the lock or cutting the steering wheel.

Steering wheel locks should not be confused with steering column locks, which are built into the steering column and immobilize it when the key is removed. Steering column locks are standard on all modern cars and reduced crime rates when first introduced in the 1970's.

== See also ==
- The Club (automotive)
