= Al Loehr =

American politician

Al (Alcuin Gerhard) Loehr (October 20, 1927 – April 26, 2013) was an American Democratic politician. Loehr served as the mayor of St. Cloud, Minnesota, for two terms from 1971 until 1980 and as Minnesota Commissioner of Veterans Affairs.

Loehr worked for the Great Northern Railway in his early life. His father was a stone cutter. Loehr enlisted in the United States Navy during World War II and served in the Pacific theater, landing in Hiroshima near the end of the war.

Loehr became the oldest living former mayor of St. Cloud in September 2010 upon the death of his predecessor, Ed Henry.
