= Lilia Amarfi =

Lilia Amarfi Лилия Амарфий

Background information
- Born: Lilia Yakovlevna Amarfi; 8 November 1949; Orhei, Moldavian SSR, USSR
- Died: 28 September 2010 (aged 60) Moscow, Russia
- Occupations: Actress, singer
- Website: amarfi.ru

Lilia Yakovlevna Amarfi (Russian: Ли́лия Яковлевна Ама́рфий; November 8, 1949, in Orhei, Moldavian SSR – September 28, 2010, in Moscow) was a Soviet and Russian operetta actress, soloist of Moscow Operetta Theater, People's Artist of Russia (1998).

== Biography ==
Lilia Amarfi was born in Moldavia in Orhei, began singing from the age of 6. The first music lessons were still in the music school of the city of Orhei according to the accordion class, in parallel in the Palace of Pioneers she was engaged in dances and vocals. Then Amarfi was the leading performer of the national ensemble Codru, directed by Vasily Asaulyak, and in a variety ensemble, sang jazz. The collective occupied the first places in the most prestigious republican and all-union competitions and festivals, and successfully performed abroad. With Vasily Asaulak's orchestra, the young actress performed all over Moldavia, and in 1966 the decade of the Moldavian SSR took place in Moscow, the gala concert took place in the Kremlin Palace of Congresses.

In 1967, Lilia came to Moscow to enter the theatrical universities, she was auditioned at the Moscow Art Theater School and GITIS, Lunacharsky Drama Theater Institute to the music faculty. The third round of auditions in both universities was held on the same day. Delayed at the GITIS exam, Lilia was late for the Moscow Art Theater School-Studio. As a result, she became a student of the Lunacharsky Drama Theater Institute the course of People's Artist of the USSR Lev Sverdlin, the vocal teacher People's Artist of the RSFSR Irina Maslennikova.

After graduating from GITIS in 1972, Amarfi was accepted into the troupe of the Moscow Operetta Theater, whose soloist was until the last days. The first role in the theater was Stassi in the play Silva by Emmerich Kálmán.

The last time Amarfi appeared on the stage of the theater on May 9, 2010, in the presentation Grand Kankan, dedicated to the 65th anniversary of the victory in the Great Patriotic War.

She died on September 28, 2010, after a serious illness. Buried in Moscow on Troyekurovskoye Cemetery 1 October 2010 on the mall of actors.

== Personal life ==
The husband is Aleksey Yakovlev (born 1961), the son of the actors Yury Yakovlev and Ekaterina Raikina, the grandson of Arkady Raikin.

== Awards ==
- Honored Artist of the RSFSR (1983)
- People's Artist of Russia (1998)
- Order of Friendship (2003)
- Order of Honour (2010)
- Numerous Russian and foreign music awards
