= Argiris Ser =

Greek street artist and illustrator (born 1978)

- Born: Thessaloniki, Greece
- Known for: Street Art
- Style: Pop Surrealism, Street Art
- Movement: Street Art, Graffiti, Lowbrow
- Website: http://serwof.blogspot.gr

Argiris SER Saraslanidis (born June 22, 1978 in Thessaloniki, Greece) is a Greek street artist and illustrator currently based in Corfu island. He is one of the pioneers in the street art scene of Greece.

== Overview ==
Drawing inspiration from cartoons, nature, candy and video games, Ser's work (a blend of graffiti, comic culture and pop surrealism) employs an arsenal of monstrous but somewhat benign characters through glimpses and images of a bizarre parallel universe. Ser's work is often in the form of large-scale murals, paintings placed in important collections and commercial work, created in association with major local and international brands.

His work can be found all around Greece as well as the U.K., France, Italy, Belgium, Netherlands, Germany, Spain, Cyprus and other European countries.

== Biography ==
Argiris Ser was born and raised in Thessaloniki, Greece. He studied graphic design and comics. Argiris became involved with street art in 1993, when he started to make graffiti.

== Exhibitions ==
=== Selected group exhibitions ===
- 2006: Horizons, Montana Gallery, Amsterdam.
- 2007: Spray 2007, 1st Street Artists Show in Tehran, Mehrin Gallery, Tehran.
- 2008: Energy Show, Miami (US).
- 2009: 9 directions expo, 2nd International Graffiti & Street Art Exhibition, Cultural Center of the City of Thessaloniki, Greece.
- 2011: International Contemporary Art Fair of Athens, Athens, Greece.
- 2011: Symbiosis?, XV Biennale de la Méditerranée, Thessaloniki, Greece.
- 2012: Spectrum, artAZ, "Technopolis" City of Athens, Athens, Greece.
- 2013: Cultural Bridges: Athens - Quito, artAZ (in collaboration with Home Identity), Quito (Ecuador).
- 2013: Moniker Art Fair, artAZ booth, London (UK).
- 2014: Like New!, Benaki Museum, Athens, Greece.

== Bibliography ==
Iossifidis K. (1997) Graffiti in Greece. The colour of the city. Athens: Oxy.

Iossifidis K. (2000) Graffiti in Greece. The colour of the city. Vol. 2. Athens: Oxy.
