= Allen Dale June =

WWII Navajo code talker (1921–2010)

- Born: November 28, 1921; Kaibito, Arizona, U.S.
- Died: September 8, 2010 (aged 88); Prescott, Arizona, U.S.
- Education: New Mexico Highlands University; University of Utah
- Spouse: Dolly Beaver (divorced) Virginia June Rose Mary Begay
- Relatives: Michael June, Adeline June, Roxie June, Cyndi June Allison June (son), Alden June (son), Marlene Smith (daughter), Janie Brown (daughter), Jonathan Beiser (grandson), Ellen June (daughter), Adolph June Jr. Floyd June; Jackie June; Keith June
- Military career
- Allegiance: United States
- Branch: United States Navy
- Service years: 1941–1945
- Rank: Sergeant
- Unit: United States Marine Corps
- Conflicts: World War II
- Awards: Congressional Gold Medal

Allen Dale June (November 28, 1921 – September 8, 2010) was an American veteran of World War II. June was one of the 29 original Navajo code talkers who served in the United States Marine Corps during the war.

== Early life ==
June was born in Kaibito, Arizona on November 28, 1921, to a Navajo family. His mother was Kinłichíiʼnii, born for Tłʼízíłání, and his father was named Yéʼii Dineʼé, born for Tachíiʼnii. June graduated from Tuba City Vocational High School in Tuba City in 1941. Once the United States entered World War II later that year and began recruiting Navajos as code talkers, June hitchhiked to Fort Defiance and Fort Wingate to enlist.

== War years ==
June enlisted in 1941 and became one of the 29 original Navajo code talkers in the U.S. Marines. he served until the end of World War II in 1945, when he was honorably discharged with the rank of sergeant.

== After War ==
June received a bachelor's degree in business administration, accounting and economics from New Mexico Highlands University in 1952. He later also obtained a master's degree in 1975 from the University of Utah.

== Congressional Gold Medal ==
Dale, along with the other original nine Navajo code talkers, received the Congressional Gold Medal on December 21, 2000. In recent years, residents of Longmont, Colorado, raised money to buy June and his third wife, Virginia June, a home when they learned the couple had no permanent place to live.

== Death ==
Allen Dale June died at Presscott Veteran's Hospital in Prescott, Arizona, on September 8, 2010, at the age of 89. June had become ill while on a trip to Arizona from the family's home in Longmont, Colorado. He was buried at a family cemetery in Kaibeto, Arizona. Navajo Nation President Joe Shirley Jr. ordered all flags to be flown at half staff in June's honor.

With June's death in 2010, Lloyd Oliver's death in 2011, and Chester Nez's death on June 4, 2014, none of the original 29 Navajo code talkers are alive.
