= Whitey and Hogan =

- Origin: North Carolina, United States
- Genres: Old time, Country
- Years active: 1935–2001
- Label: Decca
- Past members: Whitey Grant; Arval Hogan

Whitey and Hogan (Roy "Whitey" Grant, April 7, 1916, in Shelby, North Carolina – September 17, 2010, in Charlotte, North Carolina, and Arval Hogan born July 24, 1911, in Robbinsville, North Carolina - died September 12, 2003, in Charlotte) were an American country music duo active for sixty-six years.

== Biography ==
Whitey and Hogan grew up in Rutherfordton and in Andrews, North Carolina, respectively. They met for the first time in 1935 when they were both employed at the Firestone Cotton Mill in Gastonia, North Carolina. They began performing together as a duo, Whitey played the guitar and Hogan played the mandolin. Soon they were touring all over North and South Carolina and Georgia. Their debut on the radio took place at WSPA in Spartanburg, South Carolina. They called themselves the Spindle City Boys. Sponsored by the Efird's Department Store, Whitey and Hogan received a radio spot at WGNC radio in Gastonia in 1939. They also appeared on the Rustin Radio Show in Gastonia, the show was sponsored by Rustin Furniture. In 1939, they recorded sixteen sides at their first session for Decca Records, before moving to the Sonora and Deluxe labels.

They joined the WBT Briarhoppers in 1941 performing at radio station WBT in Charlotte. When Whitey and Hogan was asked to join the Grand Ole Opry they declined since the Opry required them to work on Saturdays and they didn't want to stay away from their families. Whitey and Hogan existed as a duo between 1935 and 2001. In 2003, Whitey and Hogan, along with Don White, as the only surviving former members of the Briarhoppers received the North Carolina Arts Council Folk Heritage Award.

== Discography ==
With The WBT Briarhoppers

- Early Radio - Old Homestead Records
- The Legendary WBT Briarhoppers
