= R. Smith Simpson =

American diplomat (1906–2010)

Robert Smith Simpson
- Born: Arlington, Virginia, U.S. November 9, 1906
- Died: September 5, 2010 (aged 103); Charlottesville, Virginia, U.S.
- Education: Western High School
- Alma mater: University of Virginia; Cornell Law School; Columbia University
- Occupations: Foreign Service Officer, academic
- Spouse: Henriette Lanniée
- Children: 2

Robert Smith Simpson (November 9, 1906 – September 5, 2010) was an American career Foreign Service Officer who left the diplomatic corps in 1962 as deputy examiner for the State Department after writing a report in which he highlighted what he perceived to be the ignorance of many diplomatic hopefuls who knew little about the culture and geography of the United States.

== Biography ==
Simpson was born November 9, 1906, in Arlington, Virginia and graduated from Washington, D.C.'s Western High School in 1923. He earned his undergraduate degree in 1927 and a master's degree in 1928 from the University of Virginia majoring in history, where he was also a member of Phi Sigma Kappa fraternity. Simpson was awarded a law degree from the Cornell Law School in 1931 and went to work for the New Deal National Recovery Administration. At Columbia University, he worked towards a doctorate in international affairs, but did not have the money to publish his dissertation. He was a member of the faculty of the Wharton School of the University of Pennsylvania from 1935 to 1942.

=== Diplomacy ===
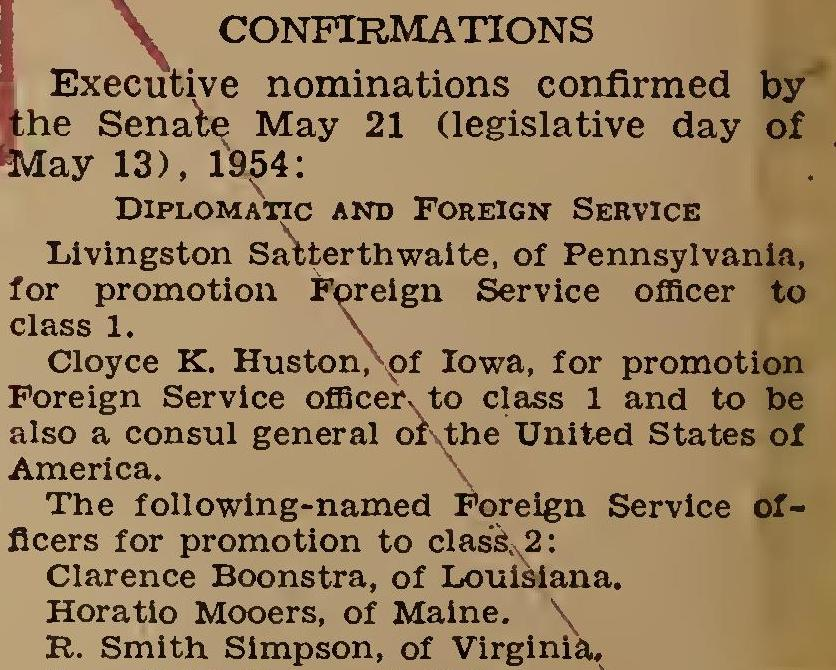
Simpson's promotion to Class 2 Foreign Service Officer, noted in a May 1954 edition of the Congressional Record

Simpson was contacted by the War Shipping Administration the day after the Attack on Pearl Harbor, and worked on addressing issues relating to convoy delays. He served as a Foreign Service Officer starting in 1945, where he contributed to the United Nations Charter. He was stationed in embassies overseas in Athens, Brussels and Mexico City, in addition to consular assignments in Bombay, India and Lourenço Marques (later Maputo), Mozambique.

Simpson wrote an article that was published in the November 1962 issue of Foreign Service Journal, a monthly publication that covers foreign affairs from the perspective of Foreign Service Officers and members of Washington's foreign policy establishment, published by the American Foreign Service Association. In the article found that students interested in joining the Foreign Service "could not name a single American painter, a single composer, a single philosopher" and were "wholly unprepared for diplomatic work". His 1967 book Anatomy of the State Department elaborated on the issue, as did his 1980 text The Crisis in American Diplomacy: Shots across the Bow of the State Department. He edited a 1968 issue of the Annals of the American Academy of Political and Social Science, which led to a collaboration with Peter F. Krogh to create the Institute for the Study of Diplomacy at Georgetown University's Edmund A. Walsh School of Foreign Service, to help better prepare students for a career as diplomats. As part of the program there, Simpson taught a course in diplomacy.

=== Death ===
Simpson died at age 103 on September 5, 2010, at a retirement community in Charlottesville, Virginia. He was survived by two daughters, three granddaughters and five great-grandchildren. His wife, the former Henriette Lanniée, died in 2007 after 73 years of marriage.
