= Carlos Mercader =

Uruguayan modern pentathlete

Personal information
- Full name: Carlos R. Mercader Arrien
- Born: 16 October 1922 Montevideo, Uruguay
- Died: 27 September 2010 (aged 87)

Sport
- Sport: Modern pentathlon

Carlos Mercader (16 October 1922 – 27 September 2010) was a Uruguayan modern pentathlete. He competed at the 1948 Summer Olympics.
