= Don Goodson =

English cricketer

Personal information
- Full name: Donald Goodson
- Born: 15 October 1932; Eastwell, Leicestershire, England
- Died: 13 September 2010 (aged 77); Cape Town, Cape Province, South Africa
- Batting: Right-handed
- Bowling: Right-arm medium-pace
- Role: Bowler

Domestic team information
- Years: Team
- 1950–53: Leicestershire
- First-class debut: 9 August 1950 Leicestershire v Essex
- Last First-class: 21 July 1953 Leicestershire v Surrey

Career statistics
Competition	First-class
Matches	9
Runs scored	36
Batting average	4.00
100s/50s	–/–
Top score	22*
Balls bowled	720
Wickets	7
Bowling average	56.28
5 wickets in innings	–
10 wickets in match	–
Best bowling	3/43
Catches/stumpings	1/–
- Source: CricketArchive, 19 August 2013

Donald Goodson (15 October 1932 – 13 September 2010) was an English cricketer. He was a right-handed batsman and a right-arm medium-pace bowler who played first-class cricket for Leicestershire between 1950 and 1953. He was born in Eastwell, Leicestershire and died at Cape Town, South Africa.

Goodson played as an amateur player in a single first-class match for Leicestershire in 1950, scoring just one run in two innings and failing to take a wicket. He reappeared in eight games in the middle of the 1953 season, but again had very little success.

In 1957, Goodson took five wickets in an innings in a rain-hit non-first-class inter-service match while playing for the Army. This encouraged Leicestershire, which by that time had a second eleven playing in the Minor Counties Championship, to give him a further trial, but although he played regularly for the second team across 1958, he did not reappear in first-class cricket, and the 1953 matches were his last.
