= William Harrison (physician) =

American physician

William Floyd Nathaniel Harrison (September 8, 1935 – September 24, 2010) was an American obstetrician who delivered 6,000 babies and then switched to abortions, performing the procedure an estimated 20,000 times in his career. He became one of the only doctors in Northwest Arkansas to provide this service to women, as other physicians stopped offering to perform abortions. His Fayetteville Women's Clinic was frequently picketed and blocked by anti-abortion protesters.

== Biography ==
Harrison was born on September 8, 1935, in Faulkner County, Arkansas. His mother joked that it was inevitable that her son would become an obstetrician, after he had been born at home while his father was on the way to get a doctor to come to the house. He went to church and read through the Bible twice before reaching his teens, but was "thoroughly unimpressed with the God it described", as The New York Times stated in his obituary.

He attended the University of Central Arkansas, but received rather poor grades and enlisted in the United States Navy. After completing his military service, he enrolled in the University of Arkansas, switching his planned major from business to pre-med in order to impress the woman he would later marry. After completing his undergraduate degree, he received his medical training at the University of Arkansas for Medical Sciences, where he received his M.D. and performed his internship and residency. While at medical school in 1967, studying obstetrics, he examined a patient whom he determined was pregnant. When told she was going to have a baby, she said, "Oh, God, doctor, I was hoping it was cancer" — words that stuck with Harrison throughout his career as a physician.

The Fayetteville Women's Clinic was established in 1972. After abortion in the United States was legalized following the United States Supreme Court decision in Roe v. Wade, Harrison began offering abortion services to his patients starting in 1974, though at the time he primarily performed handled births, delivering more than 6,000 babies through his practice. As the years progressed, he started to see more women looking for an abortion and he ultimately gave up delivering babies. He wanted to provide his patients with a safe option to terminate pregnancy and started getting more patients as other doctors in Northwest Arkansas abandoned the procedure.

In data provided by NARAL Pro-Choice America in 2010, 97% of counties in Arkansas had no abortion provider. Harrison had no qualms about becoming the only abortion provider in the area and frequently spoke in public about his defense of a woman's right to reproductive choice, saying, "I have chosen to ride this tiger unquietly, raking its side with verbal spurs, swinging my hat and whooping like a cowboy". In the aftermath of Hurricane Katrina, he offered free abortions to women who had survived the disaster. In a 2005 profile in the Los Angeles Times, Harrison said that he had been encouraged by his wife to retire after undergoing surgery for a head injury, but as one of only two abortion providers in the state, he felt that "there's no one to take my place." He performed an estimated 20,000 abortions during his career.

As a physician, Harrison believed that there was a higher moral value to protect the well-being of a pregnant woman, but would not perform abortions during the third trimester of pregnancy, even in cases where the fetus is severely disabled, as infants at that stage of development are viable and can feel pain. He would send women seeking a late-term abortion to Dr. George Tiller, who ran a clinic in Wichita, Kansas, often providing gas money to women making the trip. Tiller was murdered in 2009 by an anti-abortion activist. Harrison's practice in Fayetteville was a frequent target of anti-abortion protesters and his clinic was picketed, vandalized and even firebombed over the years, in addition to the death threats he received. Harrison described the protesters as "right-wing crazies", though he facetiously welcomed them as an excellent form of advertising for prospective patients.

He stopped seeing patients a few months before his death, as leukemia made it impossible for him to practice medicine. Harrison died at age 75 on September 24, 2010. He was survived by his wife, the former Betty Waggoner, as well as by two daughters, a son and seven grandchildren.
