= Turgan Valley =

Turgan تورگان
- Valley
- Location within Afghanistan
- Coordinates: 33.5207°N 68.21731°E
- Country: Afghanistan
- Province: Ghazni
- District: Jaghatu

Population
  - Ethnicities: Hazara people
  - Religions: Islam
- Time zone: + 4.30

Turgān (Dari: تورگان) also known as Turkān (ترکان) is a residential area in Afghanistan, located in Jaghatu district of Ghazni province.

== Demographics ==
Turgan Valley is inhabited by Hazara people.

== See also ==
- Valleys of Afghanistan
