= Jack A. Adams =

American engineering psychologist and professor

Jack A. Adams (August 3, 1922 – September 22, 2010) was an American engineering psychologist and professor at the University of Illinois at Urbana-Champaign.

He served in the United States Army during World War II, and received the Bronze Star Medal. Adams died in Falls Church, Virginia in September 2010 at the age of 88 following a battle with cancer.
