= James E. Winner Jr. =

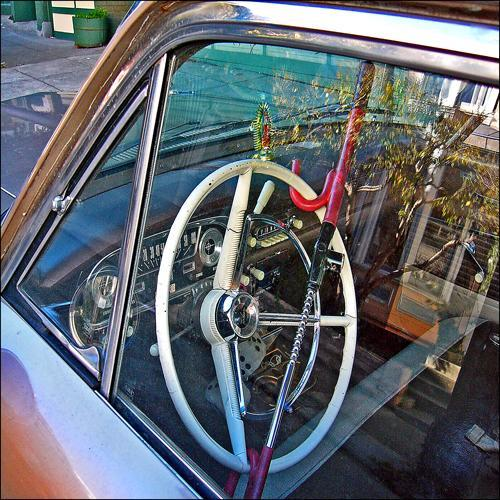
The club installed on a car's steering wheel.

James Earl Winner Jr. (July 12, 1929 – September 14, 2010) was an American entrepreneur and chairman of Winner International who created The Club, an anti-theft device that is attached and locked on to a car's steering wheel, making it more difficult for car thieves to steal the car. By 1994, sales of the device had reached 14 million units.

Winner was born in July 1929 in Transfer, Pennsylvania, where he grew up on a dairy farm to a relatively poor family and attended a one-room schoolhouse, stating in an interview that when he would speak to a group he was "comfortable saying that no one in the room was raised poorer than me" when they were growing up. He served in the United States Army in South Korea and attended Shenango Valley Business College. Winner worked variously selling chemicals, pianos and vacuum cleaners.

The inspiration for the Club came after his Cadillac was stolen, and he remembered back to his time serving in the Army when the steering wheels of jeeps would be protected using chains. Charles Johnson, a mechanic who said he had worked on developing the product with Winner before the incident in which the Cadillac was stolen, claimed that he had not been properly credited for the development of the device and that the two men had made a verbal agreement in 1985 under which they would split any profits from the sale of the Club. Winner acknowledged that Johnson had been paid a fee to work on developing the device, but that the basic design, such as the pronged hooks that secure it to the steering wheel, were part of Winner's original design. A lawsuit that Johnson filed to pursue the claim was settled in 1993 for what was reported to be $10.5 million.

Winner International was established in 1986 in Sharon, Pennsylvania to market the Club and other security and safety products. While similar locking devices had been invented decades earlier, The Club's success was credited to heavy television advertising featuring police officers talking about the Club with the slogan "If you can't steer it, you can't steal it" and distribution through major national retailers including Kmart, Sears and Wal-Mart. Winner acknowledged that the Club could be defeated by breaking the lock or sawing through the steering wheel. While improvements were made to the device, the Club could not defeat determined thieves but Winner noted that it offered the benefit of encouraging car thieves to avoid cars equipped with the Club and to avoid the time and effort needed to bypass the device. By 1993, sales of the Club had reached 10 million units. Winner would say that he had a love for sales and that "If it weren't the Club, it would have been something else". In addition to such brand extensions of the original product including the Boat Club, the Truck Club and the Bike Club, another follow-up product was the "Door Club", a security device that debuted in the early 1990s for use in homes, which Winter forecast would outsell the car device as "there are more doors than cars".

Winner was active in the community in Sharon, where his company was based, assisting charitable organizations and promoting the area as a tourist destination. The Winners were recognized with the 2010 Bill Knecht Tourism Award by the area tourism board for their efforts since the 1970s to bring visitors to Mercer County, Pennsylvania. Remembering the financial difficulties that he had faced growing up, Winner supported the charity Shoe the Children that provided money to pay for shoes for needy children.

A resident of Clark, Pennsylvania and Hollywood, Florida, Winner died at age 81 on September 14, 2010, after the Lexus SUV he was driving on Miola Road in Highland Township, Clarion County, Pennsylvania crossed the divider into oncoming traffic and crashed head on into a Chevy Blazer, killing Winner and both passengers in the other vehicle. There was no immediate explanation from Pennsylvania State Police investigating the accident as to why Winner's car crossed into the opposite lane. He is survived by his second wife, Donna, as well as by four children and grandchildren. He had divorced his first wife. Winner and his wife also had a home in Cook Forest, Pennsylvania.
