= The Club (automotive) =

Brand of automotive steering wheel lock

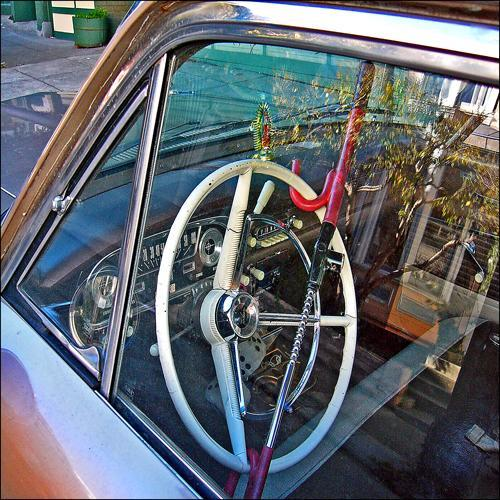
A club installed on an older car.

The Club is the trademark version of a popular automotive steering-wheel lock, produced by Sharon, Pennsylvania-based Winner International. The company was formed in 1986 for the purpose of marketing the device. The inventor, James E. Winner Jr., derived the idea for the device from his service in the Korean War, where he and his fellow soldiers were instructed to secure the steering wheels of their vehicles with metal chains.

== Design ==
The device consists of two pieces which, when locked together, form one long, fixed bar with two protruding hooks opening towards the ends of the bar. Each piece has one hook, intended to fit around the rim of the steering wheel. The smaller of the two pieces fits inside the larger piece and slides in and out for sizing. When the lock is set, the larger piece's long handle protrudes out, so that the wheel is practically impossible to turn due to collision with other parts of the car or with the driver's legs, and the device cannot be removed because it is too large to slip around the wheel. To remove the device, the user unlocks the central bar, and slides the pieces together so that the hooks no longer surround the rim of the wheel; this allows it to slip out, freeing the wheel.

== Weaknesses ==
The Club as originally designed was prone to having its lock shattered by freezing with freon; later models addressed this issue by changing to a chromium/molybdenum alloy. A television broadcast test showed that this form of attack now took several minutes of hammering. The most grievous flaw in the design is inherent in the modern construction of steering wheels; thieves can defeat this type of lock by making a cut through the steering wheel's outer rim, allowing the device to be removed. This does, however, require access to a hacksaw or other cutting tool, and ruins the steering wheel. However, after the Club has been removed, it can be used to assist the thief in breaking the steering lock built into the steering column; some thieves target cars "protected" with the Club over other cars for this reason. An additional device called "The Cap" was made which added a metal cover over the steering wheel; this can also be defeated by replacing the entire steering wheel with a similar one. A newer variation was made with a pair of hooks on each end of the Club instead of one, thereby requiring two cuts with a hacksaw to remove, and thereby twice the time to remove.

In 2000, a device called the "Club Buster" was designed for locksmiths. It is a big screw with a hook on one end and a large handle on the other and two legs designed to rest on the lock. It breaks steering wheel locks such as the Club by hooking onto the lock and tightening the screw with the handle. The large handle provides mechanical advantage, concentrating the force applied by the hook and eventually forcing the lock to fold in half or snap in two.
