= Argyris Barettas =

Greek footballer (born 1994)

Personal information
- Full name: Anargyros Barettas
- Date of birth: 6 May 1994 (age 32)
- Place of birth: Kavala, Greece
- Height: 1.80 m (5 ft 11 in)
- Position: Midfielder

Youth career
- Xanthi

Senior career*
Years	Team	Apps	(Gls)
2013–2016	Xanthi	18	(0)
2016	Panserraikos	12	(2)
2016–2017	Iraklis	1	(0)
2017–2018	Sparta	13	(2)
2018–2019	Irodotos	14	(1)
2019–2020	Ialysos		
- * Club domestic league appearances and goals as of 22 April 2019

Argyris Barettas (Greek: Αργύρης Μπαρέττας; born 6 May 1994) is a Greek professional footballer who plays as a midfielder.
