= Ivan Kirkov =

Bulgarian painter and illustrator

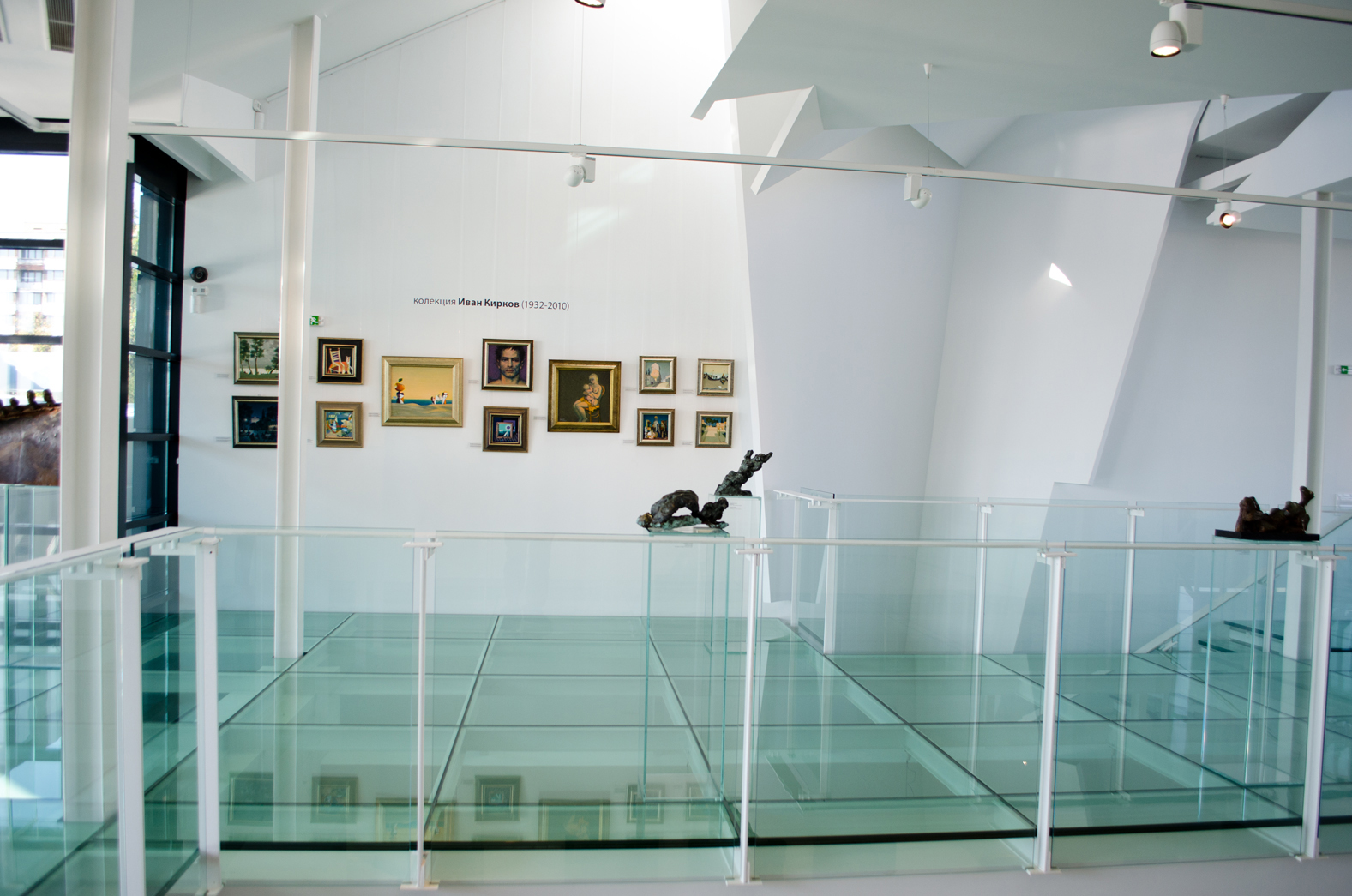
An exhibition in UniArt Gallery

Ivan Kirkov (Bulgarian: Иван Кирков) (1 January 1932 – 19 September 2010) was a Bulgarian painter and illustrator.

== Biography ==
He graduated from the National Academy of Art in Sofia. He later taught there.

In 2022, a symposium was held on his work, The lighted roads - 90 years of traces of the art of Ivan Kirkov.

He was an artist of the Plovdiv School.

He produced set designs for theatre during the 1970s.

His paintings include Woman in Red, which is in Plovdiv Art Gallery.

He has been described as one of "our [Bulgarian] artists, so famous here but ignored abroad", with other artists including Svetlin Rusev.
