= Ed Henry (Minnesota politician) =

American politician

Mayor of St. Cloud, Minnesota
- In office 1964–1971
- Succeeded by: Al Loehr

Personal details
- Born: March 30, 1921 St. Cloud, Minnesota, U.S.
- Died: September 3, 2010 (aged 89) Roseville, Minnesota, U.S.
- Party: Democratic Party
- Spouse(s): Elizabeth Anne "Betty" Henry (c. 1948 – 2004; her death); 9 children
- Education: St. John's University; University of Chicago
- Profession: American academic, politician, historian

Edward L. Henry (March 30, 1921 – September 30, 2010) was an American Democratic politician and academic. Henry was mayor of St. Cloud, Minnesota, for two terms, from 1964 to 1971. He later served as the president of several colleges and universities.

Henry was the first lay and male president of Saint Mary's College, a Catholic women's college in Indiana, from 1972 to 1974. He then became president of Saint Michael's College (in Colchester, Vermont), serving from 1976 to 1985. Henry later became the 8th president of Marian University (Fond du Lac, Wisconsin), then called Marian College of Fond du Lac, serving from 1986 to 1989. He also served as president of Belmont Abbey College in North Carolina from 1989 to 1990.

== Biography ==
=== Early life and education ===
Henry was born in St. Cloud, Minnesota, in 1921. He graduated from Cathedral High School and in 1943 received his bachelor's degree from St. John's University, an all-male college in Collegeville, Minnesota. He attended Harvard University as a graduate student. He later obtained his master's degree in political science, his MBA, and his doctorate in political science from the University of Chicago.

=== Career ===
Henry enlisted as a United States Naval officer during World War II. After the war he returned to St. Cloud, where he worked as a political science professor at St. John's University for 19 years. Henry chaired the political science department from 1954 to 1971. He later became Vice President of St. John's and the founder of the school's development department.

=== Mayor of St. Cloud ===
Henry served two terms as mayor of his native St. Cloud, from 1964 to 1971. He chaired the St. Cloud school board during the 1960s. In 2010, the St. Cloud Times described Henry as "one of the most influential mayors in St. Cloud history". During his tenure as mayor, Henry founded Tri-CAP, the first anti-poverty program to encompass several towns and other municipalities in the rural United States. He spearheaded the relocation of the St. Cloud Regional Airport, the creation of the St. Cloud Housing Authority and the development and construction of what became the Municipal Athletic Complex. Henry negotiated an agreement to annex the Crossroads Center shopping mall to the city of St. Cloud. The mall had been part of an adjacent township before the annexation.

Henry oversaw a civic development program that culminated in St. Cloud receiving an All-America City Award in 1973, after he had left office. He is credited with founding the Center for the Study of Local Government, the first small-city research center in the United States, at St. John's University. The center, founded with a grant from the Ford Foundation, operated from 1968 to 1979. His successor as mayor, Al Loehr, who served from 1971 to 1980, credited Henry with laying the foundations for the development of St. Cloud's downtown area.

=== Academic presidencies ===
Henry was appointed the first male lay President of Saint Mary's College in March 1972, shortly after Saint Mary's ended a proposed merger with the University of Notre Dame. Notre Dame had begun admitting women in the early 1970s, which hurt Saint Mary's enrollment. Shortly after taking over the presidency, Henry told a local newspaper, "I would not have accepted the presidency if I didn't see a great future for Saint Mary's." He announced his resignation as president of Saint Mary's in January 1974. Enrollment at Saint Mary's College increased 150% during his administration.

In 1976, Henry became president of Saint Michael's College, a Roman Catholic college in Colchester, Vermont, where he served as president until his retirement in 1985. His retirement from the academic world did not last long. He became the eighth president of Marian College in July 1986. Under his administration, enrollment increased at the college and the Townhouse Village residence facilities were constructed in 1988.

Henry spearheaded the creation of the first graduate program at Marian and the implementation of an evening and weekend degree completion program. He left Marian in June 1989. He served as the interim President of Belmont Abbey College in North Carolina from 1989 to 1990.

=== Author ===
Henry authored two books, including Micropolis in Transition (1971), a study of St. Cloud.

=== Death ===
Henry died in Roseville, Minnesota, on September 30, 2010, aged 89. He was survived by nine children and two brothers. He was predeceased by his wife of 56 years, Elizabeth Anne "Betty" Henry, who died in 2004.

Al Loehr, who became St. Cloud's oldest living former mayor upon Henry's death, said of his predecessor, "He was one of the most intelligent leaders I've known, and I've known a lot of them...I commend him. He was an exemplary leader and a great asset to me. That's the type of person he was — an outstanding public servant." St. Cloud's current mayor, Dave Kleis, who often received advice from Henry while serving as a Minnesota state legislator, said Henry "had a tremendous impact on St. Cloud."
