= Hugh Clark (British Army officer) =

Officer in the British Army, 1923-2010

Captain Ridley Hugh Clark MC (21 October 1923 – 11 September 2010) was a British Army officer who was awarded a Military Cross for gallantry whilst serving with the 2nd Battalion, The Oxfordshire and Buckinghamshire Light Infantry (the 52nd) during Operation Varsity: the airborne operation over the Rhine on 24 March 1945.

== Early life ==
Hugh Clark was educated at Bancroft School, Woodford Green, Hertford Grammar School and at King's College, University of Durham. He was commissioned into the Royal Artillery in July 1943 and later transferred to the Oxfordshire and Buckinghamshire Light Infantry and was posted to the 2nd Ox and Bucks (the 52nd) in September 1944. The 2nd Ox and Bucks was a Gliderborne Battalion, part of 6 Airlanding Brigade, 6 Airborne Division. He served with 2nd Ox and Bucks during the Ardennes Campaign and in the Netherlands from December 1944 to February 1945.

== Operation Varsity ==
Clark was a platoon commander during Operation Varsity: the air assault landing over the River Rhine on 24 March 1945. The 2nd Ox and Bucks encountered fierce enemy opposition and sustained 50% casualties during the battle of the landing area. Clark's platoon was tasked to capture a road bridge over the River Issel and having captured the bridge came under heavy attack by enemy tanks and infantry which caused casualties and forced the platoon from its position. Clark immediately led the remnants of his platoon in a counter-attack with fixed bayonets to recapture the bridge; during the action he also manned anti-tank weapons to stop approaching tanks. An extract from the citation for his Military Cross reads: " It was entirely due to the determination and rapid action of this officer that a very important bridge was denied falling intact to the enemy. His courage and leadership inspired his whole platoon. " He then took part in the advance across Germany to the Baltic Sea. Clark was a member of the 2nd Ox and Bucks guard of honour for the meeting between Field Marshal Montgomery and Marshal Rokossovsky at Wismar on 7 May 1945.

== Post war ==
Following the Second World War he served in Palestine during the Palestine Emergency before being demobilised from the Army in 1946. He lived in Crewkerne, Somerset.

His wife, Mary, served in the WRNS during the war, they were married in 1945. Clark wrote a book on his wartime experiences titled Hugh's Wartime Memoirs which was published privately in 2006. Captain Hugh Clark MC died on 11 September 2010.
