= Argiris Kavidas =

Greek actor and director

Argiris Kavidas (Greek: Αργύρης Καβίδας; October 9, 1976 – September 12, 2010) was a Greek actor and director best known for his role in the 2009 Greek dramatic film, Strella, which is also known by the international title, A Woman's Way. Kavidas portrayed Nikos in the film. Kavidas also appeared in several other films and theatre productions during his career.

Kavidas died of cardiac arrest in Athens on September 12, 2010, at the age of 33.
