= Athletics at the 1948 Summer Olympics – Men's 4 × 400 metres relay =

Men's 4 × 400 metres relay at the Games of the XIV Olympiad
- Dates: 6 August 1948 (heats); 7 August 1948 (final)
- Competitors: from 15 nations
- Teams: 15
- Winning time: 3:10.4

Medalists
1st place, gold medalist(s)		Roy Cochran; Cliff Bourland; Arthur Harnden; Mal Whitfield	United States
2nd place, silver medalist(s)		Jean Kerebel; Francis Schewetta; Robert Chef d'Hôtel; Jacques Lunis	France
3rd place, bronze medalist(s)		Kurt Lundquist; Lars-Erik Wolfbrandt; Folke Alnevik; Rune Larsson	Sweden

The men's 4 × 400 metres relay event at the 1948 Olympic Games took place on 6 and 7 August. The United States team won the final with a time of 3:10.4.

== Records ==
Prior to the competition, the existing World and Olympic records were as follows.

World record Olympic record	United States (Ed Ablowich, Bill Carr, Ivan Fuqua, Karl Warner)	3:08.2	Los Angeles, United States	7 August 1932

== Schedule ==
All times are British Summer Time (UTC+1)

Date	Time	Round
Friday 6 August 1948	17:30	Round 1
Saturday 7 August 1948	16:50	Final

== Results ==
=== Round 1 ===
The first two teams in each heat qualified for the Final.

Heat 1

Rank	Nation	Competitors	Time	Notes
1	United States	Cliff Bourland, Roy Cochran, Arthur Harnden, Mal Whitfield	3:12.6	Q
2	Italy	Ottavio Missoni, Luigi Paterlini, Gianni Rocca, Antonio Siddi	3:14.0	Q
3	Great Britain	Leslie Lewis, Martin Pike, Derek Pugh, Bill Roberts	3:14.2	
4	Switzerland	Oskar Hardmeier, Walter Keller, Max Trepp, Karl Volkmer	3:23.0	
-	Ireland	Charles Denroche, Paul Dolan, Reggie Myles, Jimmy Reardon	DSQ	

Heat 2

Rank	Nation	Competitors	Time	Notes
1	Jamaica	Leslie Laing, Herb McKenley, George Rhoden, Arthur Wint	3:14.0	Q
2	France	Robert Chef d'Hôtel, Jean Kerebel, Jacques Lunis, Francis Schewetta	3:17.0	Q
3	Canada	Bill LaRochelle, Ernie McCullough, Bob McFarlane, Don McFarlane	3:19.0	
4	Chile	Gustavo Ehlers, Sergio Guzmán, Jaime Hitelman, Carlos Silva	3:23.8	
5	Turkey	Doğan Acarbay, Seydi Dinçtürk, Kemal Horulu, Rıza Maksut İşman	3:35.0	

Heat 3

Rank	Nation	Competitors	Time	Notes
1	Finland	Runar Holmberg, Bebbe Storskrubb, Tauno Suvanto, Olavi Talja	3:20.6	Q
2	Sweden	Folke Alnevik, Rune Larsson, Kurt Lundquist, Lars-Erik Wolfbrandt	3:21.0	Q
3	Argentina	Hermelindo Alberti, Guillermo Avalos, Guillermo Evans, Antonio Pocovi	3:21.2	
4	Yugoslavia	Jerko Bulić, Aleksandar Ćosić, Marko Račič, Zvonko Sabolović	3:25.4	
5	Greece	Vasilios Mavroidis, Stefanos Petrakis, Lazaros Petropoulakis, Stylianos Stratakos	3:33.0	

=== Final ===
Rank	Nation	Competitors	Time (hand)	Time (auto)	Notes
1st place, gold medalist(s)	United States	Cliff Bourland, Roy Cochran, Arthur Harnden, Mal Whitfield	3:10.4	3:10.40	
2nd place, silver medalist(s)	France	Robert Chef d'Hôtel, Jean Kerebel, Jacques Lunis, Francis Schewetta	3:14.8	3:15.11	
3rd place, bronze medalist(s)	Sweden	Folke Alnevik, Rune Larsson, Kurt Lundquist, Lars-Erik Wolfbrandt	3:16.0	3:16.49	
4	Finland	Runar Holmberg, Bebbe Storskrubb, Tauno Suvanto, Olavi Talja	3:24.8	3:24.85	
	Jamaica	Leslie Laing, Herb McKenley, George Rhoden, Arthur Wint	DNF		
	Italy	Ottavio Missoni, Luigi Paterlini, Gianni Rocca, Antonio Siddi	DNF		

Key: DNF = Did not finish
