= 1950 European Athletics Championships – Men's 400 metres =

Men's 400 metres at the European Athletics Championships

The men's 400 metres at the 1950 European Athletics Championships was held in Brussels, Belgium, at Heysel Stadium on 23, 24, and 25 August 1950.

== Medalists ==
Gold	Derek Pugh; Great Britain
Silver	Jacques Lunis; France
Bronze	Lars-Erik Wolfbrandt; Sweden

== Results ==
=== Final ===
25 August

Rank	Name	Nationality	Time	Notes
1st place, gold medalist(s)	Derek Pugh	Great Britain	47.3	CR
2nd place, silver medalist(s)	Jacques Lunis	France	47.6	
3rd place, bronze medalist(s)	Lars-Erik Wolfbrandt	Sweden	47.9	
4	Guðmundur Lárusson	Iceland	48.1	
5	Leslie Lewis	Great Britain	48.7	
6	Luigi Paterlini	Italy	48.9	

=== Semi-finals ===
24 August

==== Semi-final 1 ====
Rank	Name	Nationality	Time	Notes
1	Jacques Lunis	France	47.8	Q
2	Leslie Lewis	Great Britain	47.9	Q
3	Guðmundur Lárusson	Iceland	48.0	NR Q
4	Gösta Brännström	Sweden	48.5	
5	Antonio Siddi	Italy	48.9	
6	Ragnar Graeffe	Finland	49.5	

==== Semi-final 2 ====
Rank	Name	Nationality	Time	Notes
1	Derek Pugh	Great Britain	48.6	Q
2	Lars-Erik Wolfbrandt	Sweden	48.8	Q
3	Luigi Paterlini	Italy	49.2	Q
4	Rolf Back	Finland	49.2	
5	Oscar Soetewey	Belgium	51.4	
	René Leroux	France	DNS	

=== Heats ===
23 August

==== Heat 1 ====
Rank	Name	Nationality	Time	Notes
1	Leslie Lewis	Great Britain	49.8	Q
2	Ragnar Graeffe	Finland	50.1	Q

==== Heat 2 ====
Rank	Name	Nationality	Time	Notes
1	Derek Pugh	Great Britain	49.5	Q
2	Guðmundur Lárusson	Iceland	49.8	Q

==== Heat 3 ====
Rank	Name	Nationality	Time	Notes
1	Jacques Lunis	France	48.9	Q
2	Gösta Brännström	Sweden	49.7	Q
3	Jean-Baptiste Peeters	Belgium	50.8	

==== Heat 4 ====
Rank	Name	Nationality	Time	Notes
1	Lars-Erik Wolfbrandt	Sweden	48.8	Q
2	Rolf Back	Finland	49.0	Q
3	Aleš Poděbrad	Czechoslovakia	49.7	

==== Heat 5 ====
Rank	Name	Nationality	Time	Notes
1	Luigi Paterlini	Italy	49.0	Q
2	René Leroux	France	49.3	Q
3	Zvonko Sabolović	Yugoslavia	49.5	

==== Heat 6 ====
Rank	Name	Nationality	Time	Notes
1	Antonio Siddi	Italy	49.7	Q
2	Oscar Soetewey	Belgium	49.8	Q
3	Lazar Milosevski	Yugoslavia	50.6	

== Participation ==
According to an unofficial count, 16 athletes from 9 countries participated in the event.

- Belgium (2)
- Czechoslovakia (1)
- Finland (2)
- France (2)
- Iceland (1)
- Italy (2)
- Sweden (2)
- Great Britain (2)
- Yugoslavia (2)
