= 1950 European Athletics Championships – Men's 4 × 400 metres relay =

Men's 4 × 400 metres relay at the European Athletics Championships

The men's 4 × 400 metres relay at the 1950 European Athletics Championships was held in Brussels, Belgium, at Heysel Stadium on 26 and 27 August 1950.

== Medalists ==
Gold	Martin Pike; Leslie Lewis; Angus Scott; Derek Pugh; Great Britain
Silver	Baldassare Porto; Armando Filiput; Luigi Paterlini; Antonio Siddi; Italy
Bronze	Gösta Brännström; Tage Ekfeldt; Rune Larsson; Lars-Erik Wolfbrandt; Sweden

== Results ==
=== Final ===
27 August

Rank	Nation	Competitors	Time	Notes
1st place, gold medalist(s)	Great Britain	Martin Pike; Leslie Lewis; Angus Scott; Derek Pugh	3:10.2	CR
2nd place, silver medalist(s)	Italy	Baldassare Porto; Armando Filiput; Luigi Paterlini; Antonio Siddi	3:11.0	NR
3rd place, bronze medalist(s)	Sweden	Gösta Brännström; Tage Ekfeldt; Rune Larsson; Lars-Erik Wolfbrandt	3:11.6	NR
4	France	René Leroux; Francis Schewetta; Jean-Paul Martin du Gard; Jacques Lunis	3:11.6	NR
5	Soviet Union	Pavel Kiyanenko; Gennadiy Modoy; Heino Potter; Sergey Komarov	3:15.4	NR
6	Finland	Jaakko Suikkari; Lennart Lindberg; Ragnar Graeffe; Rolf Back	3:16.6	NR

=== Heats ===
26 August

==== Heat 1 ====
Rank	Nation	Competitors	Time	Notes
1	Sweden	Gösta Brännström; Tage Ekfeldt; Rune Larsson; Lars-Erik Wolfbrandt	3:17.4	
2	Great Britain	Martin Pike; Leslie Lewis; Angus Scott; Derek Pugh	3:18.4	
3	Soviet Union	Pavel Kiyanenko; Gennadiy Modoy; Heino Potter; Sergey Komarov	3:18.6	
4	Belgium	Albert Lowagie; Jean-Baptiste Peeters; Oscar Soetewey; Marcel Dits	3:19.4	

==== Heat 2 ====
Rank	Nation	Competitors	Time	Notes
1	Italy	Baldassare Porto; Armando Filiput; Luigi Paterlini; Antonio Siddi	3:15.2	
2	Finland	Jaakko Suikkari; Lennart Lindberg; Ragnar Graeffe; Rolf Back	3:16.4	
3	France	René Leroux; Francis Schewetta; Jean-Paul Martin du Gard; Jacques Lunis	3:16.8	
4	Yugoslavia	Marko Račič; Branislav Stankovic; Zvonko Sabolović; Lazar Milosevski	3:19.2	
5	Netherlands	Jan Hofmeester; Frans Buys; Constant Mahieu	3:19.4	NR

== Participation ==
According to an unofficial count, 36 athletes from 9 countries participated in the event. The fourth member of both the Belgian and Dutch relay teams are unknown.

- Belgium (4)
- Finland (4)
- France (4)
- Italy (4)
- Netherlands (4)
- Soviet Union (4)
- Sweden (4)
- Great Britain (4)
- Yugoslavia (4)
