= Athletics at the 1948 Summer Olympics – Men's 400 metres =

Men's 400 metres at the Games of the XIV Olympiad
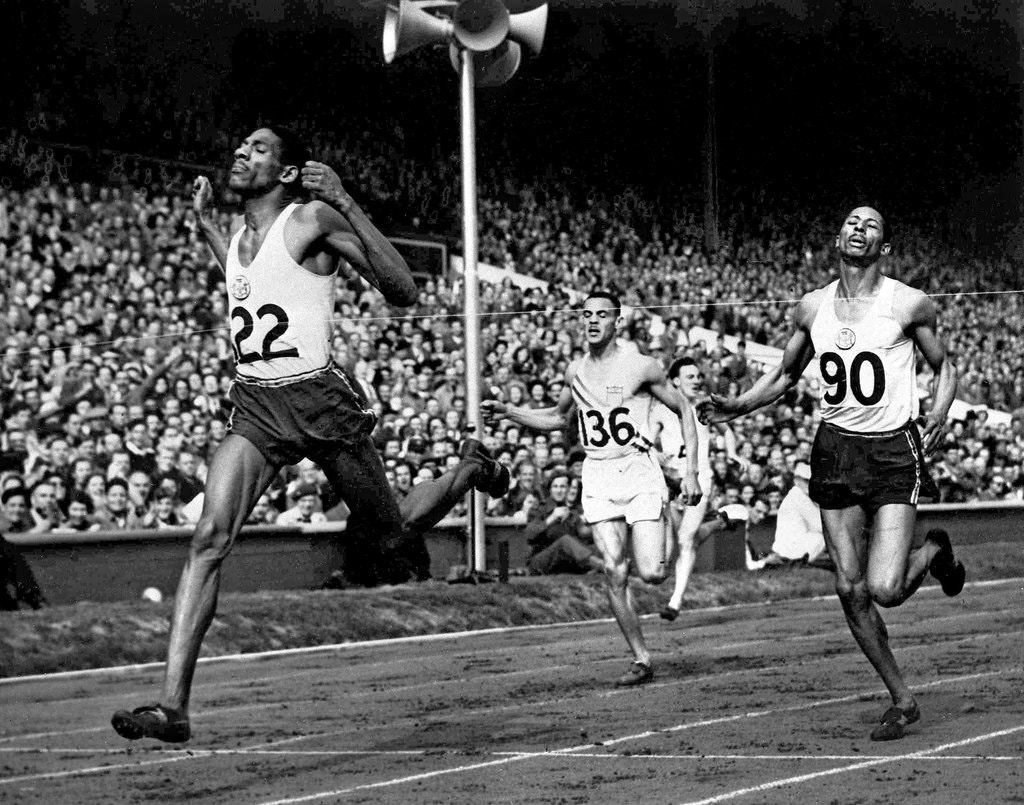
- The finish of the men's 400 metres final. Left-right: Wint, Whitfield, McKenley.
- Venue: Empire Stadium
- Dates: August 4, 1948 (heats and quarterfinals); August 5, 1948 (semifinals and final)
- Competitors: 53 from 28 nations
- Winning time: 46.2 =OR

Medalists
1st place, gold medalist(s)		Arthur Wint; Jamaica
2nd place, silver medalist(s)		Herb McKenley; Jamaica
3rd place, bronze medalist(s)		Mal Whitfield; United States

Official Video Highlights

The men's 400 metres sprint event at the 1948 Olympic Games took place between August 4 and August 5. Fifty-three athletes from 28 nations competed. The maximum number of athletes per nation had been set at 3 since the 1930 Olympic Congress. The final was won by 0.2 seconds by Jamaican Arthur Wint coming from almost 10 meters back to catch teammate and world record holder Herb McKenley. This was Jamaica's first Olympic gold medal in their debut participation at the Games, and broke a string of 3 straight American victories in the men's 400 metres.

== Background ==
This was the eleventh appearance of the event, which is one of 12 athletics events to have been held at every Summer Olympics. Bill Roberts of Great Britain was the only finalist from 1936 to return after the 12-year gap. Herb McKenley of Jamaica was the "heavy favorite," having recently broken the world record. Top challengers included fellow Jamaican Arthur Wint and American Mal Whitfield (fresh off a win in the 800 metres).

In addition to Jamaica winning gold in its first appearance in the event, Bermuda, Ceylon, Colombia, Cuba, Iceland, Iraq, Turkey, and Yugoslavia competed in the 400 metres for the first time. The United States made its eleventh appearance in the event, the only nation to compete in it at every Olympic Games to that point.

== Competition format ==
The competition retained the basic four-round format from 1920. There were 12 heats in the first round, each with between 3 and 5 athletes. The top two runners in each heat advanced to the quarterfinals. There were 4 quarterfinals of 6 runners each; the top three athletes in each quarterfinal heat advanced to the semifinals. The semifinals featured 2 heats of 6 runners each. The top three runners in each semifinal heat advanced, making a six-man final.

== Records ==
Prior to the competition, the existing World and Olympic records were as follows.

World record	Herb McKenley (JAM)	45.9	Milwaukee, United States	2 July 1948
Olympic record	Bill Carr (USA)	46.2	Los Angeles, United States	5 August 1932

== Schedule ==
All times are British Summer Time (UTC+1)

Date	Time	Round
Wednesday, 4 August 1948	15:30; 17:15	Round 1 Quarterfinals
Thursday, 5 August 1948	15:00; 16:45	Semifinals; Finals

== Results ==
=== Round 1 ===
The fastest two runners in each of the twelve heats advanced to the quarterfinals.

==== Heat 1 ====
Rank	Athlete	Nation	Time	Notes
1	Jimmy Reardon	Ireland	48.4	Q
2	Marko Račič	Yugoslavia	50.5	Q
3	Chen Yinglang	Republic of China	50.9	
4	Georgios Karageorgos	Greece	54.5	
–	Rodolfo Carrera	Argentina	DNS	
–	Niels Holst-Sørensen	Denmark	DNS	

==== Heat 2 ====
Rank	Athlete	Nation	Time	Notes
1	Herb McKenley	Jamaica	48.4	Q
2	Rune Larsson	Sweden	49.2	Q
3	Ferenc Bánhalmi	Hungary	49.6	
4	Jaime Aparicio	Colombia	50.8	
5	Guillermo Evans	Argentina	51.8	

==== Heat 3 ====
Rank	Athlete	Nation	Time	Notes
1	Zvonko Sabolović	Yugoslavia	49.9	Q
2	Kurt Lundquist	Sweden	50.0	Q
3	Antonio Pocovi	Argentina	50.7	
4	Mario Rosas	Colombia	51.4	
5	Labib Hasso	Iraq	56.8	
–	Doug Harris	New Zealand	DNS	

==== Heat 4 ====
Rank	Athlete	Nation	Time	Notes
1	George Rhoden	Jamaica	48.4	Q
2	Dennis Shore	South Africa	49.0	Q
3	Oskar Hardmeier	Switzerland	49.2	
4	Angel García	Cuba	50.2	
5	Bill Ramsay	Australia	50.3	

==== Heat 5 ====
Rank	Athlete	Nation	Time	Notes
1	Jacques Lunis	France	49.3	Q
2	Folke Alnevik	Sweden	50.2	Q
3	Carlos Monges	Mexico	50.9	
–	Herluf Christensen	Denmark	DNS	
–	Jerko Bulić	Yugoslavia	DNS	

==== Heat 6 ====
Rank	Athlete	Nation	Time	Notes
1	Dave Bolen	United States	50.1	Q
2	John Bartram	Australia	50.8	Q
3	Hazzard Dill	Bermuda	53.0	
–	Santiago Ferrando	Peru	DNS	

==== Heat 7 ====
Rank	Athlete	Nation	Time	Notes
1	Leslie Lewis	Great Britain	48.9	Q
2	Bjørn Vade	Norway	49.6	Q
3	Ernie McCullough	Canada	49.9	
4	Walter Keller	Switzerland	50.3	
5	Runar Holmberg	Finland	50.6	

==== Heat 8 ====
Rank	Athlete	Nation	Time	Notes
1	Mal Whitfield	United States	48.3	Q
2	Bill Roberts	Great Britain	48.9	Q
3	Don McFarlane	Canada	49.5	
4	Olavi Talja	Finland	50.4	
5	Max Trepp	Switzerland	50.9	

==== Heat 9 ====
Rank	Athlete	Nation	Time	Notes
1	Arthur Wint	Jamaica	47.7	Q
2	Francis Schewetta	France	48.9	Q
3	John De Saram	Ceylon	51.2	
4	Tauno Suvanto	Finland	51.5	
5	Doğan Acarbay	Turkey	53.0	

==== Heat 10 ====
Rank	Athlete	Nation	Time	Notes
1	Morris Curotta	Australia	49.1	Q
2	Rosalvo Ramos	Brazil	49.2	Q
3	Raymond Crapet	France	49.4	
4	Kemal Horulu	Turkey	51.5	
–	Duncan White	Ceylon	DNS	

==== Heat 11 ====
Rank	Athlete	Nation	Time	Notes
1	George Guida	United States	49.0	Q
2	Derek Pugh	Great Britain	49.3	Q
3	Gustavo Ehlers	Chile	49.5	
4	Stefanos Petrakis	Greece	54.5	
–	Mario Fayos	Uruguay	DNS	

==== Heat 12 ====
Rank	Athlete	Nation	Time	Notes
1	Herman Kunnen	Belgium	50.0	Q
2	Bob McFarlane	Canada	50.6	Q
3	Reynir Sigurðsson	Iceland	51.4	
4	Jaime Hitelman	Chile	51.5	
5	Stylianos Stratakos	Greece	52.8	

=== Quarterfinals ===
The fastest three runners in each of the four heats advanced to the semifinal round.

==== Quarterfinal 1 ====
Rank	Athlete	Nation	Time	Notes
1	Mal Whitfield	United States	48.0	Q
2	George Rhoden	Jamaica	48.6	Q
3	Rosalvo Ramos	Brazil	48.7	Q
4	Leslie Lewis	Great Britain	49.2	
5	Zvonko Sabolović	Yugoslavia	49.5	
6	Folke Alnevik	Sweden	50.6	

==== Quarterfinal 2 ====
Rank	Athlete	Nation	Time	Notes
1	Arthur Wint	Jamaica	47.7	Q
2	Morris Curotta	Australia	48.4	Q
3	Dennis Shore	South Africa	48.5	Q
4	Bill Roberts	Great Britain	48.6	
5	Bjørn Vade	Norway	49.7	
—	Herman Kunnen	Belgium	DNS	

==== Quarterfinal 3 ====
Rank	Athlete	Nation	Time	Notes
1	Herb McKenley	Jamaica	48.0	Q
2	George Guida	United States	48.0	Q
3	Rune Larsson	Sweden	48.8	Q
4	John Bartram	Australia	49.9	
5	Francis Schewetta	France	49.9	
6	Marko Račič	Yugoslavia	52.1	

==== Quarterfinal 4 ====
Rank	Athlete	Nation	Time	Notes
1	Dave Bolen	United States	48.0	Q
2	Jimmy Reardon	Ireland	48.3	Q
3	Bob McFarlane	Canada	48.4	Q
4	Kurt Lundquist	Sweden	48.4	
5	Derek Pugh	Great Britain	48.8	
6	Jacques Lunis	France	48.9	

=== Semifinals ===
The fastest three runners in each of the two heats advanced to the final round.

==== Semifinal 1 ====
Rank	Athlete	Nation	Time (hand)	Time (auto)	Notes
1	Arthur Wint	Jamaica	46.3	46.5	Q
2	Morris Curotta	Australia	47.2	47.28	Q
3	Mal Whitfield	United States	47.4	47.46	Q
4	George Rhoden	Jamaica	47.7	47.76	
5	Jimmy Reardon	Ireland	47.8	47.82	
—	Rune Larsson	Sweden	DNS		

==== Semifinal 2 ====
Rank	Athlete	Nation	Time (hand)	Time (auto)	Notes
1	Herb McKenley	Jamaica	47.3	47.3	Q
2	Dave Bolen	United States	47.9	47.97	Q
3	George Guida	United States	48.3	48.40	Q
4	Dennis Shore	South Africa	48.8	48.73	
5	Rosalvo Ramos	Brazil	49.1	49.23	
6	Bob McFarlane	Canada	51.7		

=== Final ===
McKenley was known for starting fast and stayed true to form in this race, hitting the halfway mark at 21.6 seconds (a split which would have placed him 6th in the final of the 200 metre event itself). Wint, however, powered through the second half and caught McKenley with 20–30 metres to go. Neither Curotta nor any of the Americans had much chance at winning behind the two Jamaicans.

Rank	Lane	Athlete	Nation	Time (hand)	Time (auto)	Notes
1st place, gold medalist(s)	3	Arthur Wint	Jamaica	46.2	46.3	=OR
2nd place, silver medalist(s)	2	Herb McKenley	Jamaica	46.4	46.53	
3rd place, bronze medalist(s)	4	Mal Whitfield	United States	46.9	46.96	
4	1	Dave Bolen	United States	47.2	47.20	
5	5	Morris Curotta	Australia	47.9	48.07	
6	6	George Guida	United States	50.2	50.80	
