= 1946 European Athletics Championships – Men's 400 metres =

Men's 400 metres at the European Athletics Championships

The men's 400 metres at the 1946 European Athletics Championships was held in Oslo, Norway, at Bislett Stadion on 22 and 23 August 1946.

== Medalists ==
Gold	Niels Holst-Sørensen; Denmark
Silver	Jacques Lunis; France
Bronze	Derek Pugh; Great Britain

== Results ==
=== Final ===
23 August

Rank	Name	Nationality	Time	Notes
1st place, gold medalist(s)	Niels Holst-Sørensen	Denmark	47.9	
2nd place, silver medalist(s)	Jacques Lunis	France	48.3	
3rd place, bronze medalist(s)	Derek Pugh	Great Britain	48.9	
4	Sven-Erik Nolinge	Sweden	48.9	
5	William Roberts	Great Britain	49.5	
	Herman Kunnen	Belgium	DNS	

=== Heats ===
22 August

==== Heat 1 ====
Rank	Name	Nationality	Time	Notes
1	Jacques Lunis	France	48.6	Q
2	Derek Pugh	Great Britain	48.9	Q
3	Oskar Hardmeier	Switzerland	49.5	
4	Anton Blok	Netherlands	49.6	
5	Gunnar Bergsten	Denmark	50.3	
6	Kjartan Jóhannsson	Iceland	50.7	NR

==== Heat 2 ====
Rank	Name	Nationality	Time	Notes
1	Niels Holst-Sørensen	Denmark	48.2	Q
2	William Roberts	Great Britain	48.5	Q
3	Stig Lindgård	Sweden	48.7	
4	Sergey Komarov	Soviet Union	48.8	
5	Adam Piaskowy	Poland	52.6	

==== Heat 3 ====
Rank	Name	Nationality	Time	Notes
1	Herman Kunnen	Belgium	48.9	Q
2	Sven-Erik Nolinge	Sweden	49.0	Q
3	Luigi Paterlini	Italy	49.1	
4	Leopold Láznička	Czechoslovakia	50.4	

== Participation ==
According to an unofficial count, 15 athletes from 12 countries participated in the event.

- Belgium (1)
- Czechoslovakia (1)
- Denmark (2)
- France (1)
- Iceland (1)
- Italy (1)
- Netherlands (1)
- Poland (1)
- Soviet Union (1)
- Sweden (2)
- Switzerland (1)
- Great Britain (2)
