= Tage Ekfeldt =

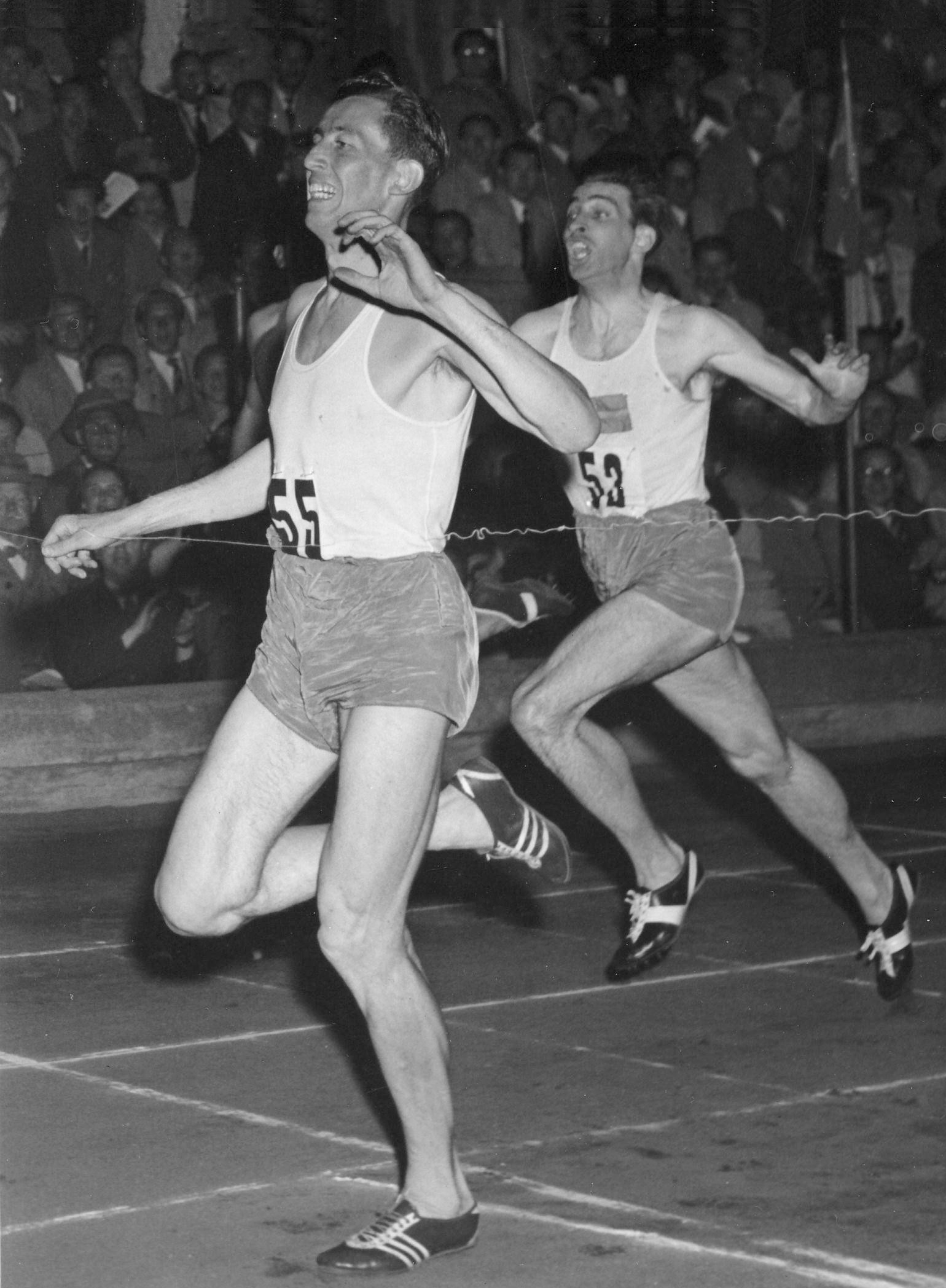
- Tage Ekfeldt (left) and Gösta Brännström in 1952

Personal information
- Born: 14 June 1926 Kuddby, Norrköping, Sweden
- Died: 28 December 2005 (aged 79) Skövde, Sweden

Sport
- Sport: Athletics
- Event(s): 400 m, 800 m
- Club: Örebro SK

Achievements and titles
- Personal best(s): 400 m – 47.6 (1952); 800 m – 1:49.0 (1953)
Medal record
Men's athletics
Representing Sweden
European Championships
Bronze medal – third place	1950 Brussels	4×400 m

Tage Henning Ekfeldt (14 June 1926 – 28 December 2005) was a Swedish sprinter who won a bronze medal in the 4 × 400 m relay at the 1950 European Athletics Championships, together with Gösta Brännström, Rune Larsson and Lars-Erik Wolfbrandt. They failed to reach the final at the 1952 Summer Olympics, and finished fourth at the 1954 European Athletics Championships. Ekfeldt won the national titles in the 400 m (1952), 800 m (1952 and 1953) and 4 × 400 m (1952 and 1953). In 1953 he set a new national record in the 800 m.
