= Athletics at the 1948 Summer Olympics – Men's 400 metres hurdles =

Men's 400 metres hurdles at the Games of the XIV Olympiad
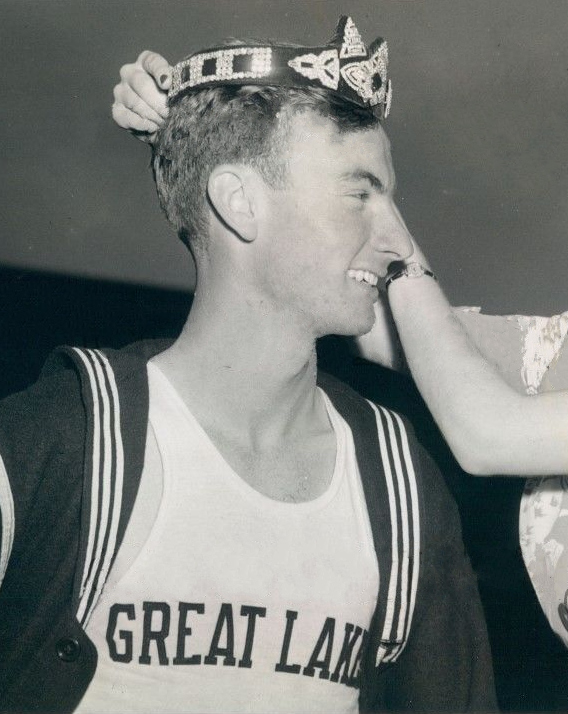
- Roy Cochran (1942)
- Venue: Wembley Stadium
- Dates: July 30, 1948 (heats, semifinals); July 31, 1948 (final)
- Competitors: 25 from 17 nations
- Winning time: 51.1 OR

Medalists
1st place, gold medalist(s)		Roy Cochran; United States
2nd place, silver medalist(s)		Duncan White; Ceylon
3rd place, bronze medalist(s)		Rune Larsson; Sweden

Video on YouTube Official Video @ 21:42

The men's 400 metres hurdles event at the 1948 Summer Olympic Games took place July 30 and July 31. There were 25 competitors from 17 nations. The maximum number of athletes per nation had been set at 3 since the 1930 Olympic Congress. The final was won by American Roy Cochran. It was the nation's second consecutive and seventh overall victory in the event. Duncan White won Ceylon's first Olympic medal in any event with his silver. As of the 2016 Games, it remains the only medal won by a male competitor from Ceylon/Sri Lanka; the nation has won one other medal, Susanthika Jayasinghe's silver in the 2000 women's 200 metres. Sweden's first medal in the men's 400 metres hurdles was won by Rune Larsson, taking bronze.

== Background ==
This was the ninth time the event was held. It had been introduced along with the men's 200 metres hurdles in 1900, with the 200 being dropped after 1904 and the 400 being held through 1908 before being left off the 1912 programme. However, when the Olympics returned in 1920 after World War I, the men's 400 metres hurdles was back and would continue to be contested at every Games thereafter.

None of the six finalists from the pre-war 1936 Games returned. The favorite was Roy Cochran of the United States, the world record holder in the 440 yards version of the event.

Ceylon, the Republic of China, Colombia, New Zealand, Pakistan, Switzerland, and Turkey each made their debut in the event. The United States made its ninth appearance, the only nation to have competed at every edition of the event to that point.

== Summary ==
Rune Larsson improved the Olympic Record by a tenth of a second in the first semi-final, chased by Dick Ault and Duncan White. In the second semi, Roy Cochran equalled Larsson's record. With qualification exclusively based on place, Jean-Claude Arifon ran a full second faster than Ottavio Missoni but was fourth in the fast first semi and had to watch the final.

From the gun, Cochran and White went out aggressively, Cochran making up the stagger on Ault to his outside before the second hurdle and White catching Larsson to his outside about the third. With the challenge, Ault stayed with his teammate Cochran into the second turn, even gaining some of the lost ground until Cochran accelerated coming off the seventh hurdle, putting a gap on Ault. As the staggers evened, Ault was challenging White for second place while Cochran had a clear lead. With the lead, Cochran continued to expand the gap, taking the tenth hurdle cautiously then pulling away to the finish. Behind him, Ault chopped his step going in to the ninth hurdle, losing his momentum and second place to White. Larsson pushed hard coming off the ninth, going past Ault and trying to catch White.

== Competition format ==
The competition featured the three-round format introduced in 1908: heats, semifinals, and a final. Ten sets of hurdles were set on the course. The hurdles were 3 feet (91.5 centimetres) tall and were placed 35 metres apart beginning 45 metres from the starting line, resulting in a 40 metres home stretch after the last hurdle. The 400 metres track was standard.

There were 6 qualifying heats, with between 4 and 5 athletes each. The top 2 men in each heat advanced to the semifinals. The 12 semifinalists were divided into 2 semifinals of 6 athletes each, with the top 3 in each semifinal advancing to the 6-man final.

== Records ==
Prior to the competition, the existing world and Olympic records were as follows.

World record	Glenn Hardin (USA)	50.6	Stockholm, Sweden	26 July 1934
Olympic record	Glenn Hardin (USA)	52.0	Los Angeles, United States	1 August 1932

Rune Larsson bettered the Olympic record with a time of 51.9 seconds in the first semifinal. Roy Cochran matched that time in the second semifinal, then dropped 0.8 seconds off it for a new record of 51.1 seconds in the final.

== Schedule ==
All times are British Summer Time (UTC+1).

Date	Time	Round
Friday, 30 July 1948	14:30; 17:00	Heats; Semifinals
Saturday, 31 July 1948	15:30	Final

== Results ==
=== Heats ===
The first round was held on 30 July. The two fastest runners from each heat qualified to the semifinals.

==== Heat 1 ====
Rank	Athlete	Nation	Time	Notes
1	Roy Cochran	United States	53.9	Q
2	Jacques André	France	54.5	Q
3	Hermelindo Alberti	Argentina	54.6	
4	Jaime Aparicio	Colombia	55.1	

==== Heat 2 ====
Rank	Athlete	Nation	Time	Notes
1	Harry Whittle	Great Britain	56.9	Q
2	Jean-Claude Arifon	France	56.9	Q
3	Lazaros Petropoulakis	Greece	57.9	
4	Mohsin Nazar Khan	Pakistan	59.5	

==== Heat 3 ====
Rank	Athlete	Nation	Time	Notes
1	John Holland	New Zealand	54.6	Q
2	Bebbe Storsrkubb	Finland	54.6	Q
3	Kemal Horulu	Turkey	55.1	
4	Michael Pope	Great Britain	55.3	
–	Bernabe Lovina	Philippines	DNS	

==== Heat 4 ====
Rank	Athlete	Nation	Time	Notes
1	Ottavio Missoni	Italy	53.9	Q
2	Rune Larsson	Sweden	54.5	Q
3	Ron Unsworth	Great Britain	55.1	
4	Sergio Guzmán	Chile	55.9	
5	Mario Rosas	Colombia	55.9	

==== Heat 5 ====
Rank	Athlete	Nation	Time	Notes
1	Dick Ault	United States	54.7	Q
2	Yves Cros	France	55.7	Q
3	Werner Christen	Switzerland	56.7	
4	Ng Liang Chiang	Republic of China	57.7	
–	Fernando Fernandes	Portugal	DNS	

==== Heat 6 ====
Rank	Athlete	Nation	Time	Notes
1	Duncan White	Ceylon	53.6	Q
2	Jeff Kirk	United States	54.3	Q
3	Alf Westman	Sweden	54.5	
4	Bill LaRochelle	Canada	54.9	
–	Julio Sabater	Puerto Rico	DNS	

=== Semifinals ===
The semifinals were held on 30 July. The three fastest runners from each heat advanced to the final.

==== Semifinal 1 ====
Rank	Athlete	Nation	Time (hand)	Time (auto)	Notes
1	Rune Larsson	Sweden	51.9	52.0	Q, OR
2	Dick Ault	United States	52.1	52.15	Q
3	Duncan White	Ceylon	52.1	52.34	Q
4	Jean-Claude Arifon	France	52.3	52.39	
5	Jeff Kirk	United States	52.5	52.49	
6	Jacques André	France	56.3		

==== Semifinal 2 ====
Rank	Athlete	Nation	Time (hand)	Time (auto)	Notes
1	Roy Cochran	United States	51.9	51.8	Q, =OR
2	Yves Cros	France	52.5	52.64	Q
3	Ottavio Missoni	Italy	53.4	53.30	Q
4	Harry Whittle	Great Britain	53.4	53.38	
5	Bebbe Storsrkubb	Finland	53.5	53.65	
6	John Holland	New Zealand	53.9	53.87	

=== Final ===
Rank	Athlete	Nation	Time (hand)	Time (auto)	Notes
1st place, gold medalist(s)	Roy Cochran	United States	51.1	51.3	OR
2nd place, silver medalist(s)	Duncan White	Ceylon	51.8	52.06	
3rd place, bronze medalist(s)	Rune Larsson	Sweden	52.2	52.30	
4	Dick Ault	United States	52.4	52.56	
5	Yves Cros	France	53.3	53.48	
6	Ottavio Missoni	Italy	54.0	54.15	

== Results summary ==
Rank	Athlete	Nation	Heats	Semifinals	Final	Notes
1st place, gold medalist(s)	Roy Cochran	United States	53.9	51.9	51.1	OR
2nd place, silver medalist(s)	Duncan White	Ceylon	53.6	52.1	51.8	
3rd place, bronze medalist(s)	Rune Larsson	Sweden	54.5	51.9	52.2	
4	Dick Ault	United States	54.7	52.1	52.4	
5	Yves Cros	France	55.7	52.5	53.3	
6	Ottavio Missoni	Italy	53.9	53.4	54.0	
7	Jean-Claude Arifon	France	56.9	52.3	Did not advance	
8	Jeff Kirk	United States	54.3	52.5	Did not advance	
9	Harry Whittle	Great Britain	56.9	53.4	Did not advance	
10	Bebbe Storsrkubb	Finland	54.6	53.5	Did not advance	
11	John Holland	New Zealand	54.6	53.9	Did not advance	
12	Jacques André	France	54.5	56.3	Did not advance	
13	Alf Westman	Sweden	54.5	Did not advance		
14	Hermelindo Alberti	Argentina	54.6	Did not advance		
15	Bill LaRochelle	Canada	54.9	Did not advance		
16	Jaime Aparicio	Colombia	55.1	Did not advance		
16	Kemal Horulu	Turkey	55.1	Did not advance		
16	Ron Unsworth	Great Britain	55.1	Did not advance		
19	Michael Pope	Great Britain	55.3	Did not advance		
20	Sergio Guzmán	Chile	55.9	Did not advance		
20	Mario Rosas	Colombia	55.9	Did not advance		
22	Werner Christen	Switzerland	56.7	Did not advance		
23	Ng Liang Chiang	Republic of China	57.7	Did not advance		
24	Lazaros Petropoulakis	Greece	57.9	Did not advance		
25	Mohsin Nazar Khan	Pakistan	59.5	Did not advance		
