= 1946 European Athletics Championships – Men's 400 metres hurdles =

European hurdling event

Men's 400 metres hurdles at the European Athletics Championships

The men's 400 metres hurdles at the 1946 European Athletics Championships was held in Oslo, Norway, at Bislett Stadion on 22 and 24 August 1946.

== Medalists ==
Gold	Bertel Storskrubb; Finland
Silver	Sixten Larsson; Sweden
Bronze	Rune Larsson; Sweden

== Results ==
=== Final ===
24 August

Rank	Name	Nationality	Time	Notes
1st place, gold medalist(s)	Bertel Storskrubb	Finland	52.2	CR, NR
2nd place, silver medalist(s)	Sixten Larsson	Sweden	52.4	NR
3rd place, bronze medalist(s)	Rune Larsson	Sweden	52.5	
4	Yves Cros	France	52.6	NR
5	Werner Christen	Switzerland	55.4	
6	Ronald Ede	Great Britain	56.5	

=== Heats ===
22 August

==== Heat 1 ====
Rank	Name	Nationality	Time	Notes
1	Yves Cros	France	54.7	Q
2	Rune Larsson	Sweden	55.8	Q
3	Werner Christen	Switzerland	57.7	Q
4	Vlastimil Holeček	Czechoslovakia	58.4	
5	Ole Dorph-Jensen	Denmark	62.7	

==== Heat 2 ====
Rank	Name	Nationality	Time	Notes
1	Bertel Storskrubb	Finland	54.2	Q
2	Sixten Larsson	Sweden	54.8	Q
3	Ronald Ede	Great Britain	55.3	Q
4	Jacques Maloubier	France	55.3	
5	Werner Rugel	Switzerland	55.5	

== Participation ==
According to an unofficial count, 10 athletes from 7 countries participated in the event.

- Czechoslovakia (1)
- Denmark (1)
- Finland (1)
- France (2)
- Sweden (2)
- Switzerland (2)
- Great Britain (1)
