= Les Lewis =

Les Lewis is the name of

- Les Lewis (footballer) (born 1926), Australian rules footballer
- Leslie Lewis (sprinter) (1924–1986), British sprinter
