= Yves Cros =

French sprinter (1923–1995)

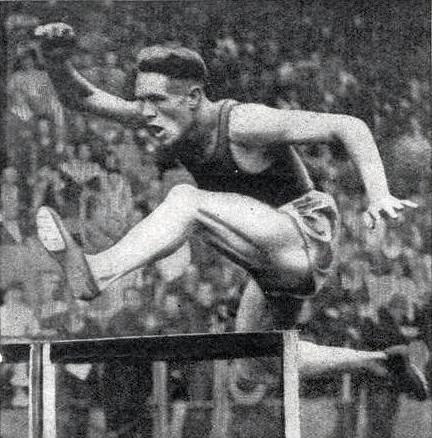
- Cros in 1946

Personal information
- Born: 5 October 1923 Aigues-Vives, Hérault, France
- Died: 21 July 1995 (aged 71) Béziers, Hérault, France
- Height: 1.73 m (5 ft 8 in)
Association football career
Managerial career
- Years: Team
- 1949–1979: USM Malakoff

Sport
- Sport: Sprint running
- Event: 400 meters hurdles
- Club: Stade Français
Medal record
Men's athletics
Representing France
European Championships
| Gold medal – first place | 1946 Oslo | 4×400 m |

Yves Cros (5 October 1923 – 21 July 1995) was a French athlete who competed in the 1948 Summer Olympics. He later became a football manager.

== Sporting career ==
=== Sprinting ===
Born on 5 October 1923 in Aigues-Vives, Hérault, Cros won his first French 400 m hurdles title in 1946, which earned him a selection for the French team at the European Athletics Championships in Oslo, where he finished fourth in the 400 m hurdles final with a time of 52.6 seconds, and also won the gold medal in the 4 × 400 m relay alongside Robert Chef d'Hôtel, Jacques Lunis, and Bernard Santona, who achieved a combined time of 3 minutes and 14.4 seconds. After successfully defending his national title in 1947, 1948, and 1949, he competed at the 1948 Summer Olympics in London, where he finished fifth in the 400 m hurdles.

Licensed to Stade Français, his personal best in the 400-meter hurdles is 52.5 seconds, which he set in 1948.

=== Football ===
Shortly after earning his coaching diplomas in the late 1940s, Cros was recruited by USM Malakoff, first as a player-coach, then exclusively as a coach, a position that he held for three decades, from 1949 until 1979, when he was replaced by Yvon Fercoq, the team captain. He was noted for successfully mixing young talent with veteran players, leading his team to several triumphs in the Paris Cup, winning the 1965–66 DH unbeaten, which earned them a place in the third division, reaching the Round of 32 of the Coupe de France on two occasions, and even playing in Ligue 2 for one season in 1975–76. Additionally, under his leadership, USMM structured itself and established its own football academy.

In 1966, the weekly magazine France Football published an article about the USMM in its May 31 edition entitled "Cros and Malakoff a prodigious rise", and a few years later, in 1973, Cros was named the best amateur coach in France by that same magazine.

== See also ==
- List of longest managerial reigns in association football
