= Gerdil (disambiguation) =

Gerdil is a surname. Notable people with this surname include:

- Hyacinthe Sigismond Gerdil, CRSP (1718–1802), Italian theologian, bishop and cardinal
- Marcel Gerdil (1928–2012), French sprinter

== See also ==
- Gerbil (disambiguation)
