= Gösta Brännström =

Swedish sprinter (1926–1997)

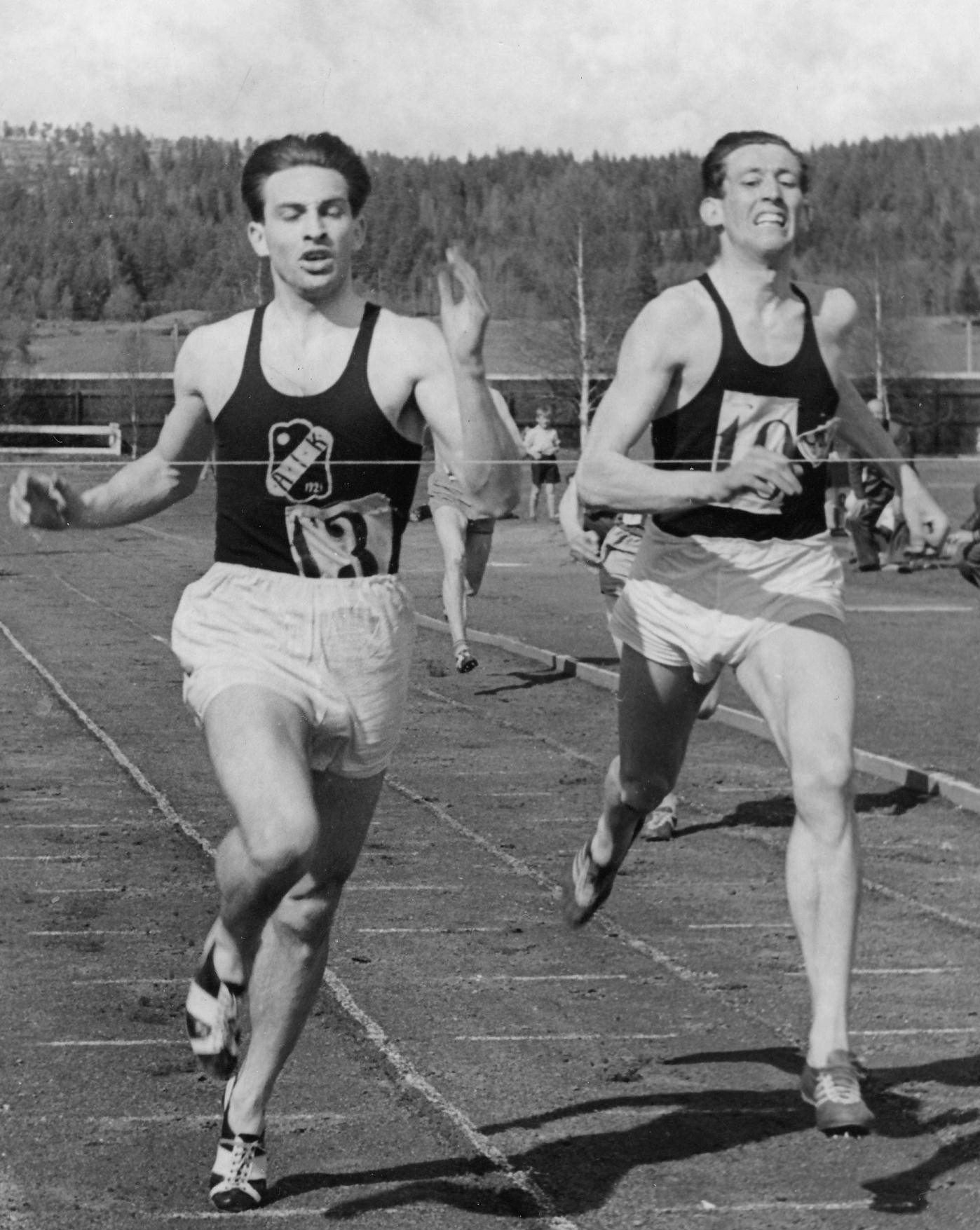
- Gösta Brännström (left) and Tage Ekfeldt in 1952

Personal information
- Born: 6 October 1926 Skellefteå, Sweden
- Died: 7 March 1997 (aged 70) Skellefteå, Sweden

Sport
- Sport: Athletics
- Event: 400 m
- Club: Skellefteå AIK

Achievements and titles
- Personal best: 400 m – 47.4 (1953)
Medal record
Men's athletics
Representing Sweden
European Championships
Bronze medal – third place	1950 Brussels	4×400 m

Gösta Martin Brännström (6 October 1926 – 7 March 1997) was a Swedish sprinter who won a bronze medal in the 4 × 400 m relay at the 1950 European Athletics Championships, together with Tage Ekfeldt, Rune Larsson and Lars-Erik Wolfbrandt. They failed to reach the final at the 1952 Summer Olympics, and finished fourth at the 1954 European Athletics Championships.

Brännström won the national 400 m title in 1951, 1953 and 1956. In 1953 he set national records in the 300 m at 34.0 and in the 400 m at 47.4.
