= 1946 European Athletics Championships – Men's 4 × 400 metres relay =

Men's 4 × 400 metres relay at the European Athletics Championships

The men's 4 × 400 metres relay at the 1946 European Athletics Championships was held in Oslo, Norway, at Bislett Stadion on 25 August 1946.

== Medalists ==
Gold	Bernard Santona; Yves Cros; Robert Chef d’Hôtel; Jacques Lunis; France
Silver	Ronald Ede; Derek Pugh; Bernard Elliott; William Roberts; Great Britain
Bronze	Folke Alnevik; Stig Lindgård; Sven-Erik Nolinge; Tore Sten; Sweden

== Results ==
=== Final ===
25 August

Rank	Nation	Competitors	Time	Notes
1st place, gold medalist(s)	France	Bernard Santona; Yves Cros; Robert Chef d’Hôtel; Jacques Lunis	3:14.4	
2nd place, silver medalist(s)	Great Britain	Ronald Ede; Derek Pugh; Bernard Elliott; William Roberts	3:14.5	
3rd place, bronze medalist(s)	Sweden	Folke Alnevik; Stig Lindgård; Sven-Erik Nolinge; Tore Sten	3:15.0	
4	Denmark	Herluf Christensen; Knud Greenfort; Gunnar Bergsten; Niels Holst-Sørensen	3:15.4	
5	Switzerland	Werner Rugel; Werner Christen; Karl Volkmer; Oskar Hardmeier	3:20.8	
6	Czechoslovakia	Vlastimil Holeček; Tomáš Šalé; Jiří David; Leopold Láznička	3:33.6	

== Participation ==
According to an unofficial count, 24 athletes from 6 countries participated in the event.

- Czechoslovakia (4)
- Denmark (4)
- France (4)
- Sweden (4)
- Switzerland (4)
- Great Britain (4)
