= Jacques André =

French fighter pilot

Jacques Louis André
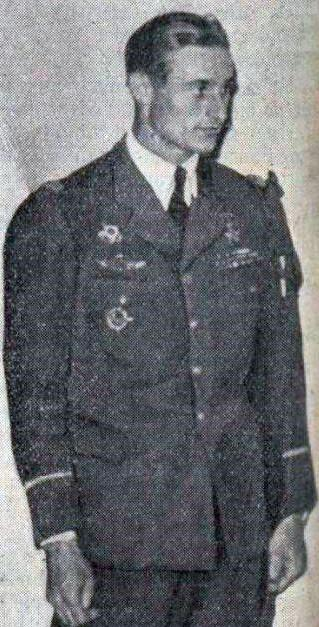
- Jacques André in May 1946.
- Born: 25 February 1919; Paris, France
- Died: 2 April 1988 (aged 69); Antibes, France
- Military career
- Allegiance: France
- Branch: French Air Force
- Service years: 1939–1968
- Rank: Colonel
- Unit: Normandie-Niemen Regiment
- Awards: Hero of the Soviet Union; Legion of Honour

Jacques André (25 February 1919 – 2 April 1988) was a French fighter pilot in the Normandie-Niemen Regiment, which flew on the Eastern Front of World War II. He was one of four French citizens awarded the title Hero of the Soviet Union and is attributed with 11 confirmed victories.

After World War II he competed in the men's 400 metres hurdles at the 1948 Summer Olympics.

== Wartime service ==
Jacques André enlisted in the French Air Force on April 15, 1939. On December 13, 1939 and began his studies at the Étampes flight school. He graduated at the top of his class on February 18, 1940 and became an instructor at the École de l'air et de l'espace in the Salon-de-Provence. During the Italian invasion of France, when Marseille was bombed by the Italians, General Staff sent students to the airbase in Pau.

Appointed as a ferry pilot in North Africa, André crossed the Mediterranean numerous times. When his father, Géo André, told him of his desire to reach Algeria, he found a Caudron Simoun in a hangar. Taking off in the dead of night, under fire from sentries they reached the Air base Maison Blanche on June 26, 1940. While André was not immediately assigned to Groupe de chasse II/3, he was eager to take the controls of one of the Dewoitine D.520s available at the base and convinced the company commander to integrate him into a squadron on October 30, 1940. Seven months later when the Syria–Lebanon campaign erupted in June 1941, Jacques André fought against British troops in the Vichy French Air Force.

From June 18 to July 11, 1941, he carried out cover, protection, ground strafing, and destruction missions. Returning to Algeria, he left Maison-Blanche and landed in Marseille in September 1941. In April 1942, he returned to Algeria before the Free Zone was occupied. At the Blida air base, he rejoined Fighter Group II/3. When the Allies landed in North Africa on November 8, 1942, he was once again placed in a precarious situation. Assigned to counter the American-British landings, his squadron was prevented from taking off by thick fog. His unit was then subjected to Royal Air Force training exercises after being taken under the wing of British instructors. André later accepted General Valin's offer, who was looking for pilots for the "Normandie-Niemen" squadron

Leaving Algiers in October 1943, he reached Tula, where the Normandie was stationed on December 22, 1943. It was on July 30, 1944 at Alytus, that André fought his first battle and achieved his first victory.

== Sports career ==
André was a four-time French champion (110m hurdles in 1937, as a junior), 110m hurdles and 4x400m relay in 1938, and military 400m hurdles in 1938. He was also a three-time French runner-up (400m hurdles in 1938 and 1939, and military 400m in 1948) and a ten-time member of the national team. In the 400m hurdles, he participated in the European Championships in 1938 and the London Olympics in 1948, reaching the semi-finals.

In 1939, he achieved the second-best European performance in the 400m hurdles, with a time of 53.6 seconds (after nearly matching the pace of American champion Roy Cochran, a future double Olympic gold medalist in this event), and then in the 4x400m relay with a time of 3:17. In 1948, he ran the 400m hurdles in 53.8 seconds.

== List of credited aerial victories ==
Plane shot down	Date	Unit	Plane flown	Location
Consolidated PBY Catalina	18 May 1942	GC II/3	D.520	
Focke-Wulf Fw 190	30 July 1944	Normandie	Yak-9	Zelwa
Junkers Ju 88	13 October 1944	Normandie	Yak-9	Schirwindt
Focke-Wulf Fw 190	16 October 1944	Normandie	Yak-9	Gumbinnen
Focke-Wulf Fw 190	20 October 1944	Normandie	Yak-9	Gumbinnen
Focke-Wulf Fw 190	22 October 1944	Normandie	Yak-9	Insterburg
Focke-Wulf Fw 190	23 October 1944	Normandie	Yak-9	Gumbinnen
Focke-Wulf Fw 190	16 January 1945	Normandie	Yak-3	Kussen
Focke-Wulf Fw 190	16 January 1945	Normandie	Yak-3	Kussen
Focke-Wulf Fw 190	16 January 1945	Normandie	Yak-3	Gumbinnen
Focke-Wulf Fw 190	16 January 1945	Normandie	Yak-3	Gumbinnen
Focke-Wulf Fw 190	19 January 1945	Normandie	Yak-3	Schillen
Henschel Hs 129	19 January 1945	Normandie	Yak-3	Gumbinnen
Henschel Hs 129	19 January 1945	Normandie	Yak-3	Insterburg
Focke-Wulf Fw 190	25 March 1945	Normandie	Yak-3	Pillau
Focke-Wulf Fw 190	8 April 1945	Normandie	Yak-3	Königsberg

== Medals and awards ==
- Legion of Honour
- Croix de Guerre
- Order of the Patriotic War
- Medal "For the Victory over Germany in the Great Patriotic War 1941–1945"
- Hero of the Soviet Union
- Order of Lenin
- Order of the Red Banner
