= Mohsin Khan =

Mohsin Khan may refer to:

- Mohsin Khan (Pakistani actor and cricketer) (born 1955)
- Mohsin Raza Khan (born 1958), Pakistani pop singer
- Mohsin Khan (Hong Kong cricketer) (born 1998)
- Mohsin Khan (Indian cricketer) (born 1998)
- Mohsin Khan (Indian actor) (born 1991), Indian television actor
- Mohsin Khan (writer), Indian fiction writer
- Mohsin Nazar Khan (born 1928), Pakistani hurdler
- Muhammad Muhsin Khan (1927–2021), Afghan doctor and author, best known for translating the Quran
