= Cliff Bourland =

American sprinter (1921–2018)

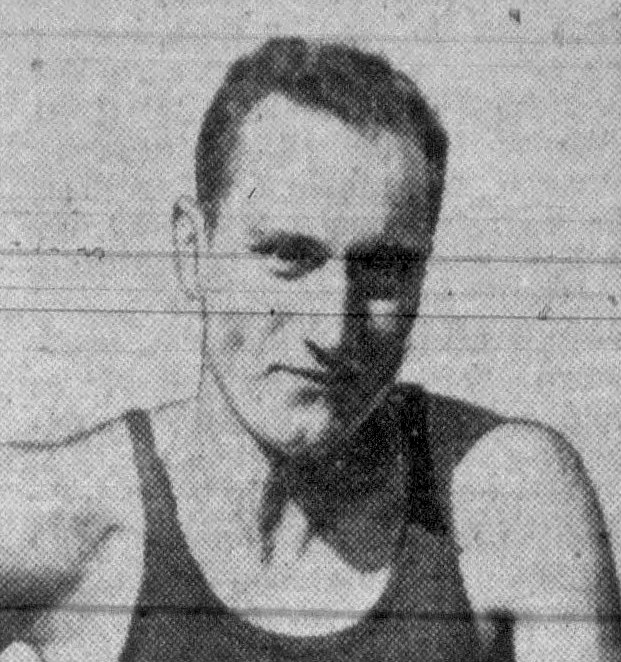
- Bourland, circa 1942

Personal information
- Full name: Clifford Frederick Bourland
- Born: January 1, 1921 Los Angeles, California, U.S.
- Died: February 1, 2018 (aged 97) Santa Monica, California, U.S.
Medal record
Men's athletics
Representing the United States
Olympic Games
Gold medal – first place	1948 London	4 × 400 m relay

Clifford Frederick Bourland (January 1, 1921 – February 1, 2018) was an American athlete who won a gold medal in the 4 × 400 m relay at the 1948 Summer Olympics.

Born in Los Angeles, California, of a German mother and an American father, Bourland ran in a competition for the first time in 1932. Graduating from Venice High School in Los Angeles, Bourland enrolled to University of Southern California and was coached by the famous Dean Cromwell. Bourland won the AAU championships in 400 m and the NCAA championships in 440 yd in 1942 and 1943. During the World War II, Bourland served in the Navy as a captain of a landing craft tank. At the London Olympics, Bourland was fifth in 200 m and won the gold medal as a member of American 4 × 400 m relay team, running the second leg in 47.3 seconds.

After the Olympics, Bourland retired from sports. After a failed attempt to start a career in municipal politics, he was hired by an insurance company. In 1984 he was a part owner of the mortgage banking firm called Norris, Biggs and Simpson.

== Competition record ==
Year	Competition	Venue	Position	Event	Notes
Representing United States
1948	Olympics	London, England	5th	200 m	21.3
