= Seydi Dinçtürk =

Turkish sprinter (1922–2019)

Personal information
- Nationality: Turkish
- Born: 1922
- Died: 6 July 2019 (aged 97)

Sport
- Sport: Sprinting
- Event: 4 × 400 metres relay

Seydi Dinçtürk (1922 – 6 July 2019) was a Turkish sprinter. He competed in the men's 4 × 400 metres relay at the 1948 Summer Olympics.
