= Aleksandar Ćosić =

Yugoslav sprinter (born 1922)

Personal information
- Nationality: Yugoslav
- Born: 19 January 1922 Pančevo, Serbia
- Died: before 2012

Sport
- Sport: Sprinting
- Event: 4 × 400 metres relay

Aleksandar Ćosić (19 January 1922 – before 2012) was a Yugoslav sprinter. He competed in the men's 4 × 400 metres relay at the 1948 Summer Olympics. Ćosić died before 2012.
