= Michael Pope (athlete) =

British hurdler

Personal information
- Nationality: British
- Born: 25 February 1927
- Died: 16 May 2016 (aged 89)

Sport
- Sport: Track and field
- Event: 400 metres hurdles

Michael Pope (25 February 1927 – 16 May 2016) was a British hurdler. He competed in the men's 400 metres hurdles at the 1948 Summer Olympics.
