= Charles Denroche =

Irish sprinter

Personal information
- Nationality: Irish
- Born: 17 December 1921
- Died: 14 August 2004 (aged 82)

Sport
- Sport: Sprinting
- Event: 4 × 400 metres relay

Charles Denroche (17 December 1921 – 14 August 2004) was an Irish sprinter. He competed in the men's 4 × 400 metres relay at the 1948 Summer Olympics.
