= Angus Scott (athlete) =

British sprinter (1927–1990)

Personal information
- Nationality: British (English)
- Born: 16 August 1927 Sheffield, England
- Died: 15 March 1990 (aged 62) Dallas, USA
- Height: 183 cm (6 ft 0 in)
- Weight: 70 kg (154 lb)

Sport
- Sport: Athletics
- Event: hurdles/400 m
- Club: University of Cambridge AC; Achilles Club
Medal record
Men's athletics
Representing Great Britain
European Championships
Gold medal – first place	1950 Brussels	4 × 400 m relay

Angus Weatherit Scott (16 August 1927 – 15 March 1990) was a British track and field athlete who competed at the 1952 Summer Olympics.

== Biography ==
Scott was born in Sheffield, England, the son of a government inspector of mines and was educated at Sedbergh School and St John's College, Cambridge, where at the latter he earned a blue in athletics and rugby.

In 1949 he was appointed president of the Cambridge University Athletic Club and was affiliated with the Achilles Club. He finished second behind Harry Whittle in the 400 metres hurdles event at the 1950 AAA Championships. Shortly afterwards he was part of the winning British 4 × 400 metres relay team at the 1950 European Athletics Championships, with Martin Pike, Leslie Lewis and Derek Pugh.

Scott had to settle for second place again behind Whittle in both the 1951 AAA Championships and 1952 AAA Championships before representing the Great Britain team at the 1952 Olympic Games in Helsinki.
