= Dyirbal =

Dyirbal may refer to:

- Dyirbal people, an ethnic group of Australia
- Dyirbal language, their language

== See also ==
- Gerbil (disambiguation)
