= Jean-Claude Arifon =

French hurdler

Personal information
- Nationality: French
- Born: 16 November 1926
- Died: 8 July 2005 (aged 78)

Sport
- Sport: Track and field
- Event: 400 metres hurdles

Jean-Claude Arifon (16 November 1926 – 8 July 2005) was a French hurdler. He competed in the men's 400 metres hurdles at the 1948 Summer Olympics.
