= Reynir Sigurðsson =

Icelandic sprinter

Personal information
- Nationality: Icelandic
- Born: 1 January 1928
- Died: 13 November 2017 (aged 89)

Sport
- Sport: Sprinting
- Event: 400 metres

Reynir Sigurðsson (1 January 1928 – 13 November 2017) was an Icelandic sprinter. He competed in the men's 400 metres at the 1948 Summer Olympics.
