= Arthur Harnden =

American sprinter

Personal information
- Full name: Arthur Harold Harnden
- Born: May 20, 1924 Yoakum, Lavaca County, Texas, U.S.
- Died: September 30, 2016 (aged 92) Corpus Christi, Texas, U.S.
Medal record
Men's athletics
Representing the United States
Olympic Games
Gold medal – first place	1948 London	4 × 400 m relay

Arthur Harold "Art" Harnden (May 20, 1924 – September 30, 2016) was an American athlete, winner of the gold medal in the 4 × 400 m relay at the 1948 Summer Olympics. He was born in Lavaca County, Texas. At the London Olympics Harnden ran the opening leg in the gold medal winning American 4 × 400 m relay team.

Competing for the Texas A&M Aggies track and field team, Harnden placed 2nd in the 400 m at the 1948 NCAA Track and Field Championships, and on a combined "South" team he won the 4 × 440 yard relay at the 1947 championships.
