= Jeff Kirk =

American hurdler (1923–1976)

Personal information
- Nationality: American
- Born: Jeffrey L. Kirk; October 25, 1923
- Died: February 20, 1976 (aged 52)

Sport
- Sport: Track and field
- Event: 400 metres hurdles

Jeffrey L. Kirk (October 25, 1923 – February 20, 1976) was an American hurdler. He competed in the men's 400 metres hurdles at the 1948 Summer Olympics. He was educated at Mercersburg Academy, where he trained under Jimmy Curran, and the University of Pennsylvania, where he trained under Lawson Robertson. After graduation he worked as an educator at Kimberton Farms School, Lehigh University and Adelphi University.
