= Dick Ault =

American hurdler

Personal information
- Full name: Richard Francis Ault
- Nickname: Dick
- Nationality: American
- Born: December 10, 1925 St. Louis, Missouri, U.S.
- Died: July 16, 2007 (aged 81) Jefferson City, Missouri, U.S.
- Height: 1.88 m (6 ft 2 in)
- Weight: 78 kg (172 lb)

Sport
- Country: United States
- Sport: Athletics
- Event: 400 metres hurdles
- College team: University of Missouri

Richard Francis Ault (December 10, 1925 – July 16, 2007) was an American hurdler.

== Early life ==
Richard Francis Ault was born on December 10, 1925, in St. Louis, Missouri. He attended Roosevelt High School in St. Louis.

== Track career ==
Ault participated in track and field at the University of Missouri and had a second-place finish in the intermediates at the 1949 AAU. He won the Big 6 220-yard low hurdles in 1946 and 1947 and the Big 7 low hurdles in 1948 and 1949. Ault was the conference champion in the 440-yard dash in 1947 and 1949. He finished fourth in the Men's 400 metres hurdles at the 1948 Summer Olympics. He set a 440-yard hurdle world record of 52.2 on August 31, 1949 at Bislett Stadion in Oslo, Norway.

== Later life ==
Ault taught at Highland Park High School, where he led the cross-country team to a state championship, and later became a physical education professor at Westminster College. He also coached track, cross-country, swimming, and golf at Westminster. He was inducted into the Missouri Sports Hall of Fame in 1993. He is also a member of the University of Missouri Hall of Fame and the National High School Sports Hall of Fame.
