= Georgios Karageorgos =

Greek sprinter

Personal information
- Nationality: Greek
- Born: 10 January 1915
- Died: 1993 (aged 77–78)

Sport
- Sport: Sprinting
- Event: 400 metres

Georgios Karageorgos (10 January 1915 – 1993) was a Greek sprinter. He competed in the men's 400 metres at the 1948 Summer Olympics.
