= Jean Kerebel =

French sprinter (1918–2010)

Olympic medal record

Men's athletics

Representing France
Silver medal – second place	1948 London	4x400 metre relay

Jean-Baptiste Kerebel (2 April 1918, in Paris – 9 March 2010) was a French track and field athlete who mainly competed in the 400 metres.

He competed for France at the 1948 Summer Olympics held in London, Great Britain, where he won the silver medal in the men's 4 x 400 metre relay with his teammates François Schewetta, Robert Chef d’Hotel, and Jacques Lunis.
