= Ron Unsworth =

British athlete

Personal information
- Nationality: British
- Born: 8 November 1923 Ashton-under-Lyne, Lancashire, England
- Died: 23 December 2008 (aged 85) Wilmslow, Cheshire, England

Sport
- Sport: Track and field
- Event: 400 metres hurdles

Ron Unsworth (8 November 1923 – 23 December 2008) was a British hurdler. He competed in the men's 400 metres hurdles at the 1948 Summer Olympics.
