= Alf Westman =

Personal information
- Nationality: Swedish
- Born: 4 January 1921
- Died: 2 April 1998 (aged 77)

Sport
- Sport: Track and field
- Event: 400 metres hurdles

Alf Westman (4 January 1921 – 2 April 1998) was a Swedish hurdler. He competed in the men's 400 metres hurdles at the 1948 Summer Olympics.
