= Reggie Myles (athlete) =

Irish sprinter

Personal information
- Nationality: Irish
- Born: Reginald James Myles; 1924 Dublin, Ireland
- Died: 8 November 1997 (aged 72–73) Wexford, Ireland

Sport
- Sport: Sprinting
- Event: 4 × 400 metres relay

Reginald James Myles (1924 – 8 November 1997) was an Irish sprinter. He competed in the men's 4 × 400 metres relay at the 1948 Summer Olympics.
