= Baldassare Porto =

Italian sprinter

Medal record

Men's athletics

Representing Italy

European Championships
Silver medal – second place	1950 Brussels	4×400 m

Baldassare Porto (19 January 1923 – 30 November 2013) was an Italian sprinter who competed in the men's 4 × 400 m event at the 1952 Summer Olympics in Helsinki. In 1950 he also became a national champion in the 400m discipline.
