= Sixten Larsson =

Swedish hurdler

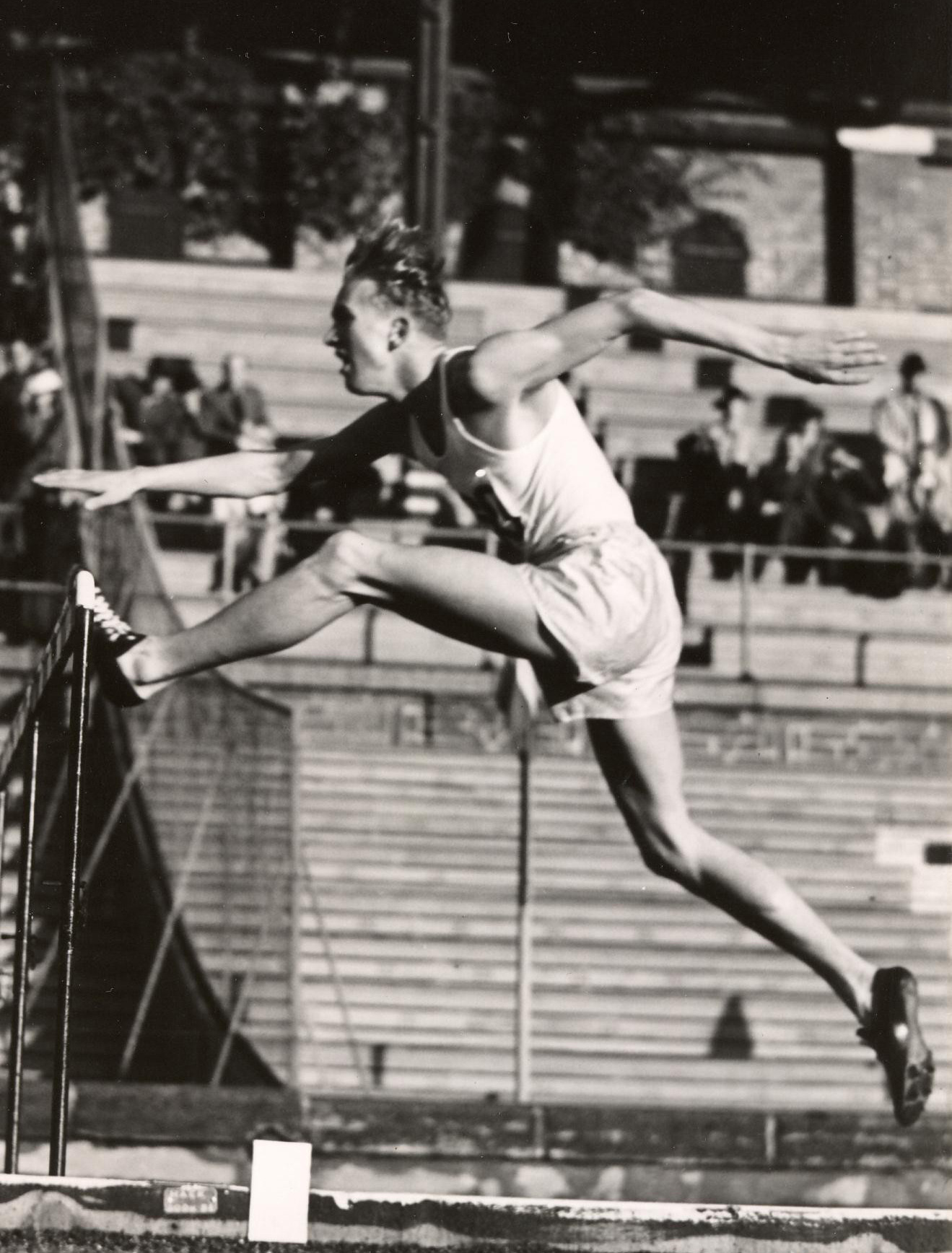

Personal information
- Born: 31 July 1918
- Died: 3 February 1995 (aged 76)

Sport
- Sport: Athletics
- Event(s): 400 m hurdles, 800 m
- Club: IFK Borås

Achievements and titles
- Personal best(s): 400 mH – 52.4 (1943); 800 m – 1:53.1 (1942)
Medal record
Men's athletics
Representing Sweden
European Championships
Silver medal – second place	1946 Oslo	400 m hurdles

Sixten Larsson (31 July 1918 – 3 February 1995) was a Swedish athlete who competed mainly in the 400 m hurdles. In this event he won a silver medal at the 1946 European Athletics Championships as well as five national titles in 1940–1944.
