= George Guida =

American sprinter

George James Guida (August 29, 1924 – September 7, 2015) was an American sprinter who competed in the 1948 Summer Olympics running the 400 meters. He finished sixth in the final behind Arthur Wint's Olympic Record. Injured in the final, he did not run on the American 4x400 meters relay team that ultimately won the gold medal. He was born in Philadelphia, Pennsylvania. While running for Villanova University he was the 1947 Indoor National Champion at 600 yards.

== Competition record ==
Year	Competition	Venue	Position	Event	Notes
Representing United States
1948	Olympics	London, United Kingdom	6th	400 m	50.2
