= Raymond Crapet =

French sprinter

Personal information
- Nationality: French
- Born: 11 November 1927 Bury, Oise, France
- Died: 1 February 2002 (aged 74) Gif-sur-Yvette, Essonne, France

Sport
- Sport: Sprinting
- Event: 400 metres

Raymond Kléber Ernest Crapet (11 November 1927 – 1 February 2002) was a French sprinter. He competed in the men's 400 metres at the 1948 Summer Olympics.
