= Bertel Storskrubb =

Finnish athlete

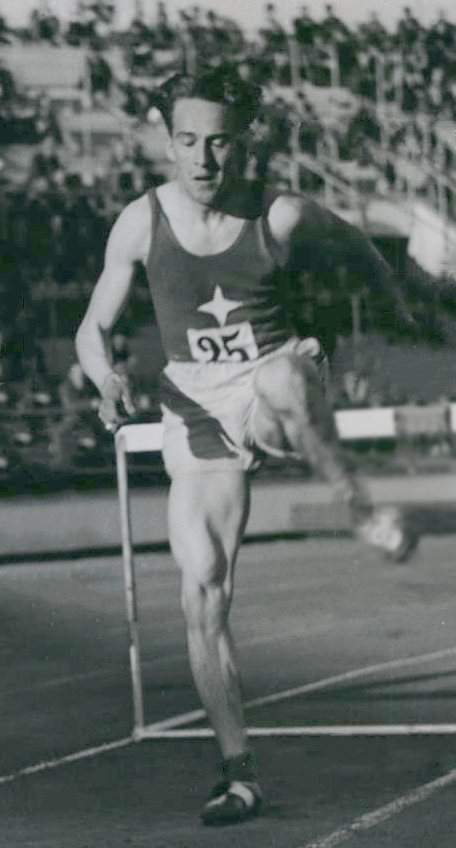

Personal information
- Born: 24 April 1917 Jakobstad, Finland
- Died: 21 April 1996 (aged 78) Helsinki, Finland
- Height: 170 cm (5 ft 7 in)
- Weight: 66 kg (146 lb)

Sport
- Sport: Athletics
- Event(s): 400–1500 m, 400 m hurdles
- Club: HIFK, Helsinki

Achievements and titles
- Personal best(s): 400 m – 48.0 (1945); 800 m – 1:49.3 (1945); 1500 m – 3:53.4 (1945); 400 mH – 52.2 (1946)
Medal record
Men's athletics
Representing Finland
European Championships
Gold medal – first place	1946 Oslo	400 m hurdles

Alf Bertel "Bebbe" Storskrubb (24 April 1917 – 21 April 1996) was a Finnish middle-distance runner and hurdler. He competed at the 1948 Summer Olympics, where he placed fourth in the 4 × 400 m relay and competed in 400 m hurdles. He became European champion in the hurdles in 1946.
