= Tauno Suvanto =

Finnish sprinter

Personal information
- Nationality: Finnish
- Born: 6 August 1924
- Died: 29 November 1974 (aged 50)

Sport
- Sport: Sprinting
- Event: 400 metres

Tauno Suvanto (6 August 1924 – 29 November 1974) was a Finnish sprinter. He competed in the men's 400 metres at the 1948 Summer Olympics.
