= Mohsin Nazar Khan =

Pakistani hurdler

Personal information
- Nationality: Pakistani
- Born: 1 January 1928

Sport
- Sport: Track and field
- Event: 400 metres hurdles

Mohsin Nazar Khan (born 1 January 1928) is a Pakistani former hurdler. He competed in the men's 400 metres hurdles at the 1948 Summer Olympics.
