= Herman Kunnen =

Belgian sprinter

Personal information
- Nationality: Belgian
- Born: 28 March 1925
- Died: 27 August 2001 (aged 76)

Sport
- Sport: Sprinting
- Event: 400 metres

Herman Kunnen (28 March 1925 – 27 August 2001) was a Belgian sprinter. He competed in the men's 400 metres at the 1948 Summer Olympics.
