= Les Lewis (footballer) =

Australian rules footballer

Personal information
- Full name: Leslie Blair Lewis
- Born: 3 September 1926; Windsor, Victoria
- Died: 20 April 2002 (aged 75)
- Original team: Elwood
- Height: 175 cm (5 ft 9 in)
- Weight: 67 kg (148 lb)

Playing career^{1}
Years	Club	Games (Goals)
1948–49	St Kilda	10 (3)
- ^{1} Playing statistics correct to the end of 1949.

Leslie Blair Lewis (3 September 1926 – 20 April 2002) was an Australian rules footballer who played with St Kilda in the Victorian Football League (VFL).
