= Aigues-Vives, Hérault =

Aigues-Vives
- Commune
- Coat of arms
- Location of Aigues-Vives
- Location within France Location within Occitanie
- Coordinates: 43°20′19″N 2°49′09″E
- Country: France
- Region: Occitania
- Department: Hérault
- Arrondissement: Béziers
- Canton: Saint-Pons-de-Thomières
- Intercommunality: CC du Minervois au Caroux

Government
  - Mayor (2020–2026): Jean-Pierre Barthes
- Area^{1}: 12.81 km^{2} (4.95 sq mi)
- Elevation: 169 m (554 ft)
- Highest elevation: 251 m (823 ft)
- Lowest elevation: 90 m (300 ft)
- Population (2023): 476
  - Density: 37.2/km^{2} (96.2/sq mi)
- Time zone: UTC+01:00 (CET)
  - Summer (DST): UTC+02:00 (CEST)
- INSEE/Postal code: 34007 /34210
- ^{1} French Land Register data, which excludes lakes, ponds, glaciers > 1 km^{2} (0.386 sq mi or 247 acres) and river estuaries.

Aigues-Vives (French pronunciation: [ɛɡ viv]; Languedocien: Aigas Vivas) is a commune in the Hérault department in the Occitanie region in southern France.

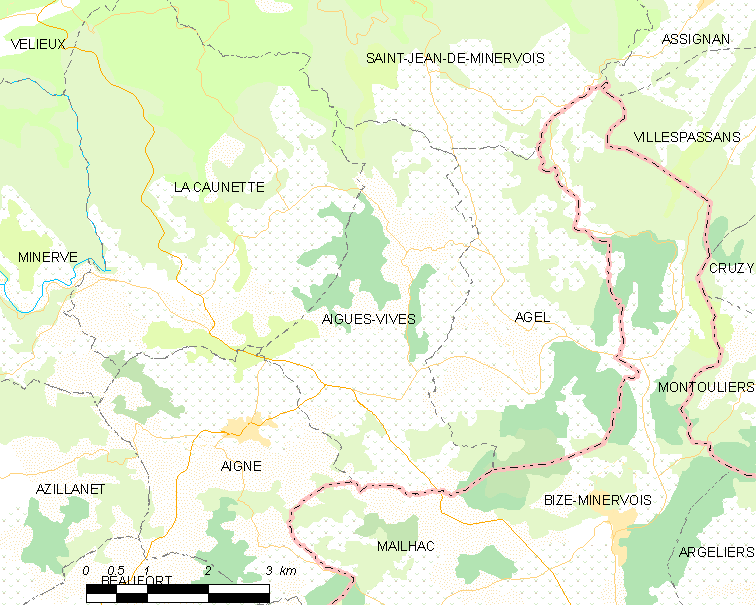
Map

== Population ==
Historical population
Year	Pop.	±% p.a.
1968	503	—
1975	401	−3.19%
1982	374	−0.99%
1990	347	−0.93%
1999	354	+0.22%
2007	410	+1.85%
2012	446	+1.70%
2017	469	+1.01%
2023	476	+0.25%
Source: INSEE

== See also ==
- Communes of the Hérault department
