= Jimmy Reardon (athlete) =

Irish sprinter and Olympian

Personal information
- Nationality: Irish
- Born: 18 October 1925
- Died: 20 June 2019 (aged 93)

Sport
- Sport: Athletics

Jimmy Reardon (18 October 1925 – 20 June 2019) was an Irish sprinter who competed in the 1948 Summer Olympics. He was the first Irish athlete to be offered a scholarship to attend Villanova University in Pennsylvania, United States.

== Competition record ==
Year	Competition	Venue	Position	Event	Notes
Representing Ireland
1948	Olympics	London, United Kingdom	5th, Heat 1, SF	400 m	47.8
