= Jerko Bulić =

Yugoslav sprinter

Personal information
- Nationality: Yugoslav
- Born: 25 September 1924
- Died: 11 June 2008 (aged 83)

Sport
- Sport: Sprinting
- Event: 4 × 400 metres relay

Jerko Bulić (25 September 1924 – 11 June 2008) was a Yugoslav sprinter. He competed in the men's 4 × 400 metres relay at the 1948 Summer Olympics.
