= Olavi Talja =

Finnish sprinter

Personal information
- Nationality: Finnish
- Born: 20 March 1925 Jääski, Finland (now Lesogorsky, Russia)
- Died: 17 December 1994 (aged 69) Lahti, Finland

Sport
- Sport: Sprinting
- Event: 400 metres

Olavi Talja (20 March 1925 – 17 December 1994) was a Finnish sprinter. He competed in the men's 400 metres at the 1948 Summer Olympics, but did not advance beyond the first round.
