= Folke Alnevik =

Swedish sprinter (1919–2020)

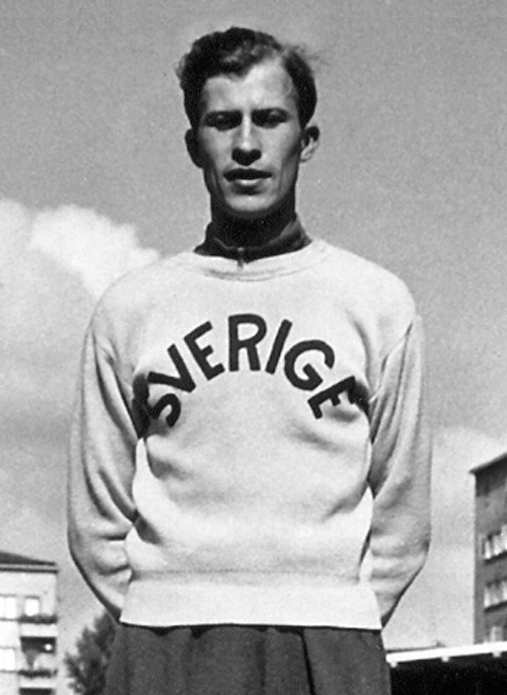

Personal information
- Full name: Arvid Folke Alnevik
- Born: 31 December 1919 Arbrå, Sweden
- Died: 17 August 2020 (aged 100) Gävle, Sweden
- Height: 1.82 m (6 ft 0 in)
- Weight: 70 kg (154 lb)

Sport
- Sport: Athletics
- Event: 400 m
- Club: I14 IF, Gävle

Achievements and titles
- Personal best: 400 m – 48.1 (1947)
Medal record
Men's athletics
Representing Sweden
Olympic Games
Bronze medal – third place	1948 London	4×400 metre relay
European Championships
Bronze medal – third place	1946 Oslo	4×400 metre relay

Arvid Folke Alnevik (31 December 1919 – 17 August 2020) was a Swedish sprinter who specialized in the 400 metres. His best results were in the 4×400 metre relay, winning bronze medals at the 1946 European Championships and the 1948 Summer Olympics. Alnevik was a career military officer and retired with the rank of Major. After that he worked as a sports official and was a driving force behind promotion of golf in the Gävle area. As of the 2018 Winter Olympics, he held the status as the oldest living Olympic medalist.

Alnevik contracted COVID-19 in 2020 and was able to overcome it, but died from complications of a bedsore on 17 August 2020.
