= Max Trepp =

Swiss sprinter

Personal information
- Nationality: Swiss
- Born: 30 June 1924 Bern, Switzerland
- Died: 1 January 1990 (aged 65) Bern, Switzerland

Sport
- Sport: Sprinting
- Event: 400 metres

Max Trepp (30 June 1924 – 1 January 1990) was a Swiss sprinter. He competed in the men's 400 metres at the 1948 Summer Olympics.
