= Jaakko Suikkari =

Finnish sprinter

Jaakko Johannes Suikkari
Personal information
- Nationality: Finnish
- Born: 20 September 1925 Punkaharju, Finland
- Died: 28 December 2014 (aged 89) Varkaus, Finland

Sport
- Sport: Sprinting
- Event: 400 metres

Jaakko Suikkari (20 September 1925 – 28 December 2014) was a Finnish sprinter. He competed in the men's 400 metres at the 1952 Summer Olympics.
