= Bjørn Vade =

Norwegian middle-distance runner

Personal information
- Nationality: Norwegian
- Born: 2 May 1922 Kristiania, Norway
- Died: 30 May 2006 (aged 84)

Sport
- Sport: Athletics
- Event: Middle distance running
- Club: IK Tjalve

Bjørn Vade (2 May 1922 – 30 May 2006) was a Norwegian middle-distance runner. He was born in Kristiania, and represented the sports club IK Tjalve. He competed in 400 m and 800 m at the 1948 Summer Olympics in London.
