= Stylianos Stratakos =

Greek sprinter (1914–1998)

Personal information
- Nationality: Greek
- Born: 14 December 1914 Athens, Greece
- Died: 16 June 1998 (aged 83) Athens, Greece

Sport
- Sport: Sprinting
- Event: 400 metres

Stylianos Stratakos (14 September 1914 – 16 June 1998) was a Greek sprinter. He competed in the men's 400 metres at the 1948 Summer Olympics. Stratakos died in Athens on 16 June 1998, at the age of 83.
