= Robert Chef d'Hôtel =

French sprinter (1922–2019)

Medal record

Men's athletics

Representing France

Olympic Games
Silver medal – second place	1948 London	4x400 m

European Championships
Gold medal – first place	1946 Oslo	4x400 m

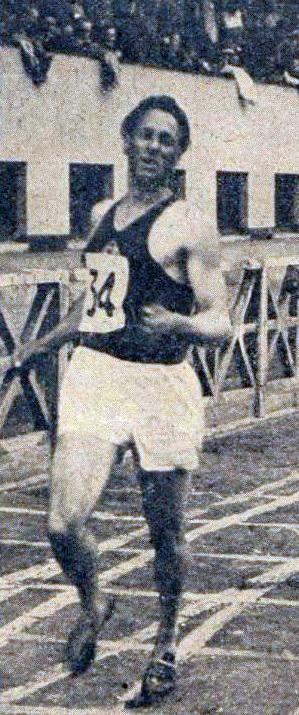
Robert Chef d’Hôtel, champion de France du 800 mètres en juillet

Robert Claude Henri Chef d'Hôtel (2 February 1922 – 19 October 2019) was a track and field athlete from France, who competed mainly in the men's 400 metres during his career. He was born in Nouméa, Sud, New Caledonia in February 1922.

Chef d'Hôtel competed for France at the 1948 Summer Olympics held in London, Great Britain where he won the silver medal in the men's 4 × 400 metre relay with his teammates Jean Kerebel, Francis Schewetta and Jacques Lunis.

He died on 19 October 2019, at the age of 97.
