= Kusa, Latvia =

Village in Latvia

Coordinates: 56.89794°N 26.12699°E

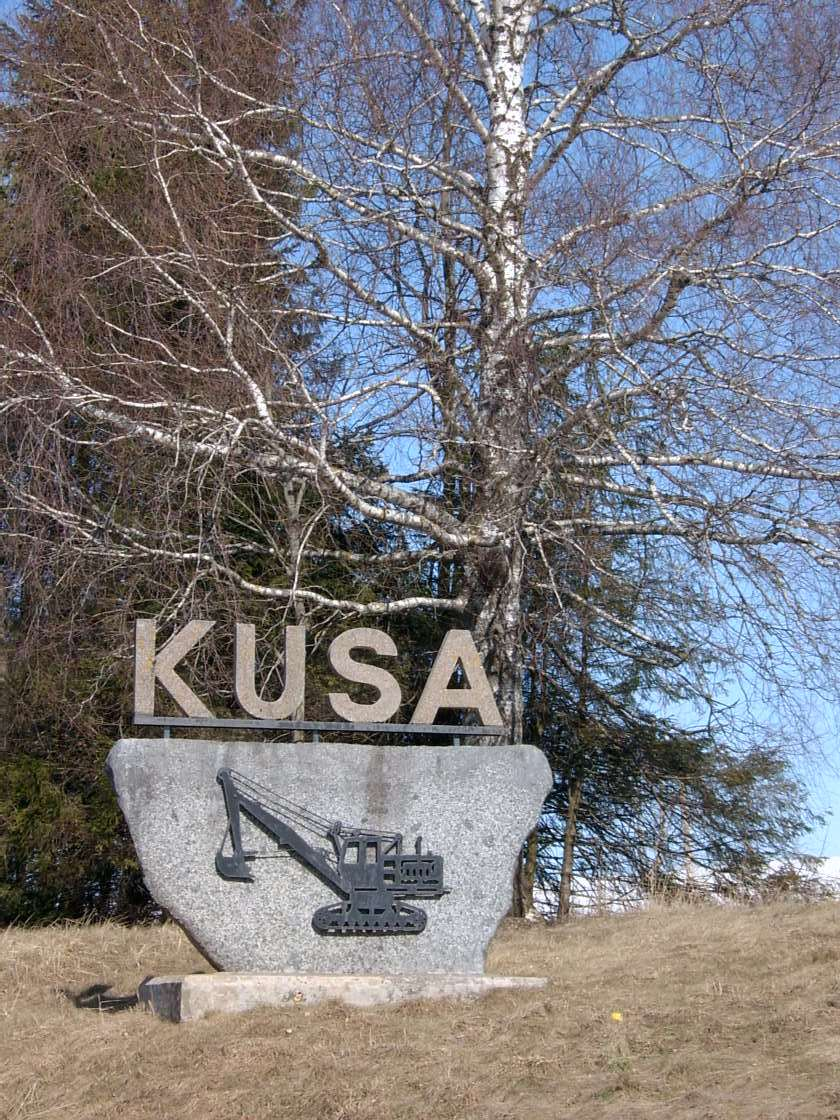
Kusa

Kusa is a village in the Arona Parish of Madona Municipality in the Vidzeme region of Latvia. As of 2008, Kusa had a population of 686. Kusa is situated by the P30 road at the 8th kilometer heading from Madona towards Cēsis.

== History ==
Kusa mostly developed from a former manor with few houses into a village under Soviet rule in the 1970s under the guidance of the PMK-19 land improvement brigade (Latvian: Pārvietojamā mehanizatoru kolonna, Mobile Mechanizator Column), which was draining marshes and working on other amelioration tasks for the local Soviet collective farm (kolkhoz). Block houses, a district heating system and paved roads were built. Kusa has a postal office (postal code LV-4847), primary school (Kusas pamatskola) with approximately 250 students, small shops, a hotel, saw mill, car-repair workshops and a gas station.
