= Derek Pugh =

English sprinter

Personal information
- Nationality: {British (English)
- Born: 8 February 1926 Tooting, London, England
- Died: 2 May 2008 (aged 82) Tooting, London, England
- Height: 178 cm (5 ft 10 in)
- Weight: 70 kg (154 lb)

Sport
- Sport: Athletics
- Events: 440 y, 400 m
- Club: South London Harriers
Medal record
Men's athletics
Representing England
British Empire Games
Silver medal – second place	1950 Auckland	4 × 400 relay
Representing Great Britain
European Championships
Gold medal – first place	1950 Brussels	400 m
Gold medal – first place	1950 Brussels	4×400 m
Silver medal – second place	1946 Oslo	4×400 m
Bronze medal – third place	1946 Oslo	400 m

Derek Charles Pugh (8 February 1926 – 2 May 2008) was a British track and field athlete who competed in sprint events and participated at the 1948 Summer Olympics.

== Biography ==
Pugh, born in Tooting, London, finished third behind Arthur Wint in the 440 yards event at the 1946 AAA Championships and then won individual bronze and a relay silver at the 1946 European Athletics Championships.

Pugh represented the Great Britain team at the 1948 Olympic Games in London, racing in the 400 metres and 4 × 400 metres relay events.

Pugh became the British 440 yards champion after winning the British AAA Championships title at the 1949 AAA Championships and the following year in 1950 had to settle for second place behind Leslie Lewis.

Pugh represented the England athletics team and won a silver medal in the 4 × 400 relay at the 1950 British Empire Games in Auckland, New Zealand. He was also a double champion for Great Britain at the 1950 European Athletics Championships, winning the 400 metres title and the 4 × 400 metres relay gold medal, the latter with Martin Pike, Leslie Lewis and Angus Scott.

In 1951, Pugh won his second AAA title.

== Competition record ==
Year	Competition	Venue	Position	Event	Notes
Representing United Kingdom
1948	Olympics	London, England	5th, Heat 4, Round 2	400 m	48.8
