= Lazaros Petropoulakis =

Greek sprinter

Personal information
- Nationality: Greek
- Born: 25 June 1925 Athens, Kingdom of Greece

Sport
- Sport: Sprinting
- Event: 4 × 400 metres relay

Lazaros Petropoulakis (born 25 June 1925) was a Greek sprinter. He competed in the men's 4 × 400 metres relay at the 1948 Summer Olympics.
