= Runar Holmberg =

Finnish sprinter

Personal information
- Nationality: Finnish
- Born: 25 April 1923
- Died: 27 December 1993 (aged 70)

Sport
- Sport: Sprinting
- Event: 400 metres

Runar Holmberg (25 April 1923 – 27 December 1993) was a Finnish sprinter. He competed in the men's 400 metres at the 1948 Summer Olympics.
