= Guðmundur Lárusson =

Icelandic sprinter and middle-distance runner (1925–2010)

Personal information
- Nationality: Icelandic
- Born: 23 November 1925 Eyrarbakki, Iceland
- Died: 14 January 2010 (aged 84)

Sport
- Sport: Sprinting
- Event: 400 metres

Guðmundur Lárusson (23 November 1925 – 14 January 2010) was an Icelandic sprinter. He competed in the men's 400 metres at the 1952 Summer Olympics.
