= Gerbil (disambiguation) =

A gerbil is a small rodent commonly kept as a pet.

Gerbil may also refer to:

- Gerbillinae, a subfamily of rodents containing relatives of the species kept as a pet
- The Gerbils, an indie rock band from Athens, Georgia
- Pierre-Yves Gerbeau, French businessman, nicknamed the Gerbil by British media
- "Gerbil", song by Filter from Short Bus
- Gerbil Scheme, a dialect of the Scheme programming language

== See also ==
- Dyirbal (disambiguation)
