= Martin Pike (athlete) =

British sprinter (1920–1997)

Personal information
- Nationality: British (English)
- Born: 12 July 1920 Tendring, Clacton-on-Sea, England
- Died: 10 January 1997 (aged 77) Taunton, England

Sport
- Sport: Athletics
- Event: 440 y/400 m
- Club: Polytechnic Harriers
Medal record
Men's athletics
Representing Great Britain
European Championships
Gold medal – first place	1950 Brussels	4 × 400 m relay

Martin William Pike (12 July 1920 – 10 January 1997) was a British athlete who competed in the 1948 Summer Olympics.

== Biography ==
Pike was born in Tendring, Essex. In 1939 he won the AAA Junior Championship title in a record time of 50.8 seconds

Although he lost many promising years of athletics due to World War II, he won the 1947 AAA relay title with his club the Polytechnic Harriers and the 1948 Middlesex quarter-mile championship. Pike represented the Great Britain team at the 1948 Olympic Games in London, where he competed in the 4 × 400 metres relay.

He was part of the winning British 4×400 metres relay team at the 1950 European Athletics Championships, with Angus Scott, Leslie Lewis and Derek Pugh.
