= Francis Schewetta =

French sprinter

Olympic medal record

Men's athletics

Representing France
Silver medal – second place	1948 London	4x400 metre relay

Francis Schewetta (29 August 1919 – 8 October 2007) was a French track and field athlete, who mainly competed in the men's 400 metres during his career. He was born in Bréhat, Côtes-d'Armor.

He competed for France at the 1948 Summer Olympics held in London, Great Britain, where he won the silver medal in the men's 4 x 400 metre relay with his teammates Jean Kerebel, Robert Chef d’Hotel and Jacques Lunis.

== Competition record ==
Year	Competition	Venue	Position	Event	Notes
Representing France
1948	Olympics	London, United Kingdom	5th, Heat 3, Round 2	400 m	49.9
