= Walter Keller (athlete) =

Swiss sprinter

Personal information
- Nationality: Swiss

Sport
- Sport: Sprinting
- Event: 400 metres

Walter Keller was a Swiss sprinter. He competed in the men's 400 metres at the 1948 Summer Olympics.
