= Lars-Erik Wolfbrandt =

Swedish sprinter

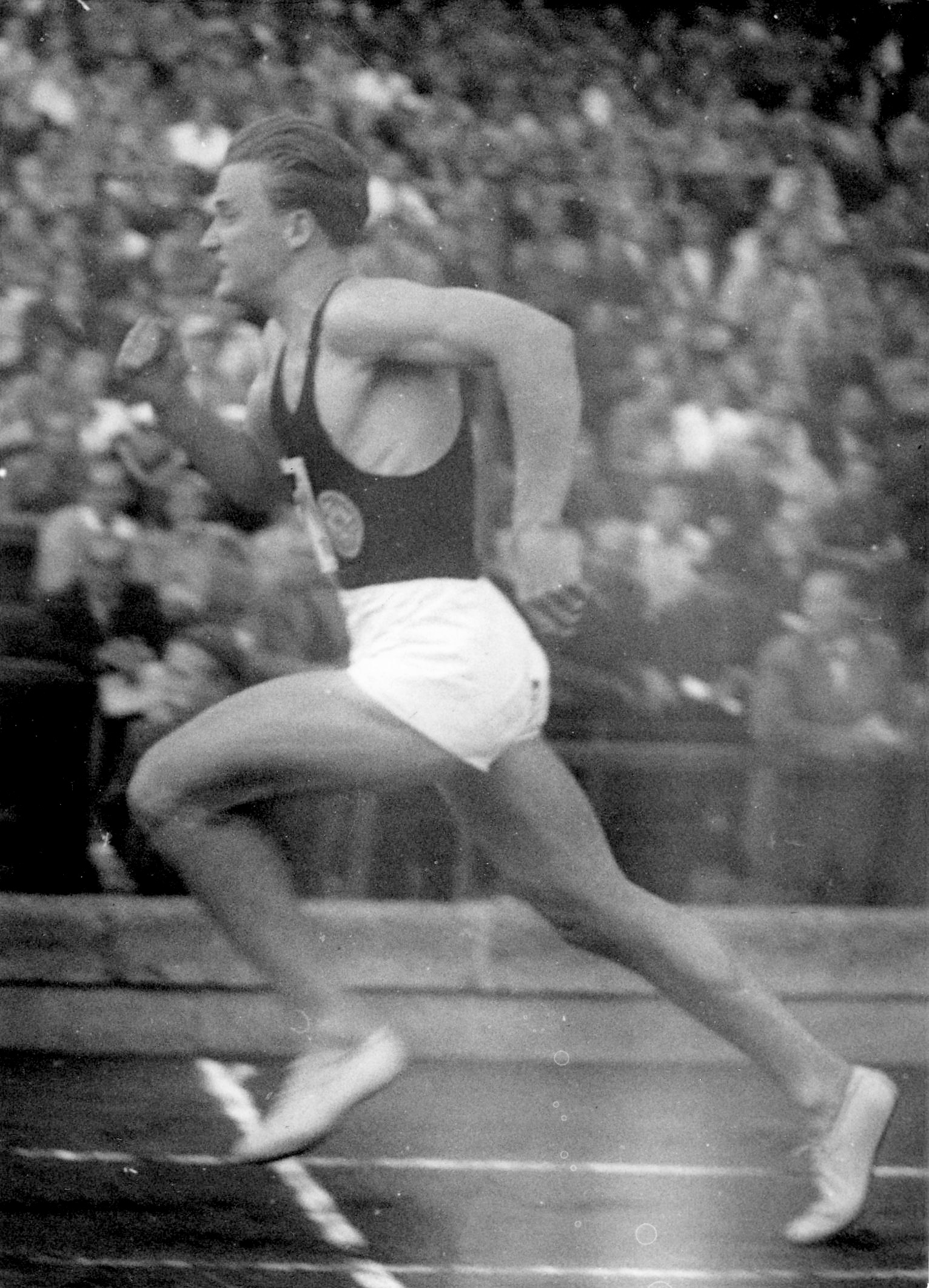

Personal information
- Born: 8 December 1928 Forshem, Sweden
- Died: 23 March 1991 (aged 62) Örebro, Sweden
- Height: 1.78 m (5 ft 10 in)
- Weight: 70 kg (154 lb)

Sport
- Sport: Athletics
- Events: 400 m, 800 m
- Club: Örebro SK

Achievements and titles
- Personal bests: 400 m – 47.4 (1953); 800 m – 1:50.0 (1952)
Medal record
Men's athletics
Representing Sweden
Olympic Games
Bronze medal – third place	1948 London	4×400 m relay
European Championships
Bronze medal – third place	1950 Brussels	400 m
Bronze medal – third place	1950 Brussels	4×400 m relay

Lars-Erik Ragnar Wolfbrandt (8 December 1928 – 23 March 1991) was a Swedish sprinter who won a bronze medal in the 4 × 400 m relay at the 1948 Summer Olympics. He won two more bronze medals at the 1950 European Athletics Championships, in the 400 m and 4 × 400 m relay. At the 1952 Summer Olympics he competed in the 400 m, 800 m and 4 × 400 m relay; he finished eighth in the 800 m and failed to reach the finals in the 400 m events.

Nationally Wolfbrandt won five Swedish titles, in the 200 m (1948–49) and 400 m (1949–50 and 1954). His brother Herold was an association football player.
