= Oscar Soetewey =

Belgian middle-distance runner

Personal information
- Nationality: Belgian
- Born: 13 January 1925 Antwerp, Belgium
- Died: 8 January 1988 (aged 62) Belgium

Sport
- Sport: Middle-distance running
- Event: 800 metres

Oscar Soetewey (13 January 1925 – 8 January 1988) was a Belgian middle-distance runner. He competed in the men's 800 metres at the 1952 Summer Olympics.
