= Werner Christen =

Swiss hurdler

Personal information
- Nationality: Swiss
- Born: 29 April 1914
- Died: 2008 (aged 93–94)

Sport
- Sport: Track and field
- Event: 400 metres hurdles
- Club: STB, Bern

Werner Christen (29 April 1914 – 2008) was a Swiss hurdler. He competed in the men's 400 metres hurdles at the 1948 Summer Olympics.

Christen finished second behind Harry Whittle in the 440 yards hurdles event at the British 1947 AAA Championships and third the following year, again behind Whittle at the 1948 AAA Championships.
