= 1950 European Athletics Championships =

4th European Athletics Championships
- Dates: 23 – 27 August
- Host city: Brussels, Belgium
- Venue: Stade du Heysel
- Level: Senior
- Type: Outdoor
- Events: 34
- Participation: 454 athletes from 24 nations

The 4th European Athletics Championships were held from 23 August to 27 August 1950 in the Heysel Stadium of the Belgian capital Brussels. Contemporaneous reports on the event were given in the Glasgow Herald.

== Men's results ==
Complete results were published.

=== Track ===
Event	Gold		Silver		Bronze	
100 metres	Étienne Bally (FRA)	10.7	Franco Leccese (ITA)	10.7	Vladimir Sukharev (URS)	10.7
200 metres	Brian Shenton (GBR)	21.5	Étienne Bally (FRA)	21.8	Jan Lammers (NED)	22.1
400 metres	Derek Pugh (GBR)	47.3 CR	Jacques Lunis (FRA)	47.6	Lars Wolfbrandt (SWE)	47.9
800 metres	John Parlett (GBR)	1:50.5 CR	Marcel Hansenne (FRA)	1:50.7	Roger Bannister (GBR)	1:50.7
1500 metres	Wim Slijkhuis (NED)	3:47.2 CR	Patrick El Mabrouk (FRA)	3:47.8	Bill Nankeville (GBR)	3:48.0
5000 metres	Emil Zátopek (TCH)	14:03.0 CR	Alain Mimoun (FRA)	14:26.0	Gaston Reiff (BEL)	14:26.2
10,000 metres	Emil Zátopek (TCH)	29:12.0 CR	Alain Mimoun (FRA)	30:21.0	Väinö Koskela (FIN)	30:30.8
Marathon	Jack Holden (GBR)	2:32:13 CR	Veikko Karvonen (FIN)	2:32:45	Feodosy Vanin (URS)	2:33:47
110 metres hurdles	André-Jacques Marie (FRA)	14.6	Ragnar Lundberg (SWE)	14.7	Peter Hildreth (GBR)	15.0
400 metres hurdles	Armando Filiput (ITA)	51.9 CR	Yuriy Lituyev (URS)	52.4	Harry Whittle (GBR)	52.7
3000 metres steeplechase	Jindřich Roudný (TCH)	9:05.4	Petar Šegedin (YUG)	9:07.4	Erik Blomster (FIN)	9:08.8
10,000 metres track walk	Fritz Schwab (SUI)	46:01.8 CR	Emile Maggi (FRA)	46:16.8	John Mikaelsson (SWE)	46:48.2
50 kilometres walk	Pino Dordoni (ITA)	4:40:43	John Ljunggren (SWE)	4:43:25	Verner Ljunggren (SWE)	4:49:28
4 × 100 metres relay	Soviet Union; Vladimir Sukharev; Levan Kalyayev; Levan Sanadze; Nikolay Karakulov	41.5	France; Étienne Bally; Jacques Perlot; Yves Camus; Jean-Pierre Guillon	41.8	Sweden; Göte Kjellberg; Leif Christersson; Stig Danielsson; Hans Rydén	41.9
4 × 400 metres relay	Great Britain; Martin Pike; Leslie Lewis; Angus Scott; Derek Pugh	3:10.2 CR	Italy; Baldasare Porto; Armando Filiput; Luigi Paterlini; Antonio Siddi	3:11.0	Sweden; Gösta Brännström; Tage Ekfeldt; Rune Larsson; Lars Wolfbrandt	3:11.6

=== Field ===
Event	Gold		Silver		Bronze	
High jump	Alan Paterson (GBR)	1.96	Arne Åhman (SWE)	1.93	Claude Bénard (FRA)	1.93
Long jump	Torfi Bryngeirsson (ISL)	7.32	Gerard Wessels (NED)	7.22	Jaroslav Fikejz (TCH)	7.20
Pole vault	Ragnar Lundberg (SWE)	4.30 CR	Valto Olenius (FIN)	4.25	Juho Piironen (FIN)	4.25
Triple jump	Leonid Shcherbakov (URS)	15.39 CR	Valdemar Rautio (FIN)	14.96	Ruhi Sarıalp (TUR)	14.53
Shot put	Gunnar Huseby (ISL)	16.74 CR	Angiolo Profeti (ITA)	15.16	Oto Grigalka (URS)	15.14
Discus throw	Adolfo Consolini (ITA)	53.75 CR	Giuseppe Tosi (ITA)	52.31	Olli Partanen (FIN)	48.69
Javelin throw	Toivo Hyytiäinen (FIN)	71.26	Per-Arne Berglund (SWE)	70.06	Ragnar Ericzon (SWE)	69.82
Hammer throw	Sverre Strandli (NOR)	55.71	Teseo Taddia (ITA)	54.73	Jiří Dadák (TCH)	53.64
Decathlon	Ignace Heinrich (FRA)	7364 CR	Örn Clausen (ISL)	7297	Kjell Tånnander (SWE)	7175

== Women's results ==
=== Track ===
Event	Gold		Silver		Bronze	
100 metres	Fanny Blankers-Koen (NED)	11.7 CR	Yevgeniya Sechenova (URS)	12.3	June Foulds (GBR)	12.4
200 metres	Fanny Blankers-Koen (NED)	24.0	Yevgeniya Sechenova (URS)	24.8	Dorothy Hall (GBR)	25.0
80 metres hurdles	Fanny Blankers-Koen (NED)	11.1 CR	Maureen Gardner (GBR)	11.6	Micheline Ostermeyer (FRA)	11.7
4 × 100 metres relay	Great Britain; Elspeth Hay; Jean Desforges; Dorothy Hall; June Foulds	47.4	Netherlands; Xenia Stad-de Jong; Bertha Brouwer; Gré de Jongh; Fanny Blankers-Koen	47.4	Soviet Union; Elene Gokieli; Sofya Malshina; Zoya Dukhovich; Yevgeniya Sechenova	47.5

=== Field ===
Event	Gold		Silver		Bronze	
High jump	Sheila Lerwill (GBR)	1.63	Dorothy Tyler-Odam (GBR)	1.63	Galina Ganeker (URS)	1.63
Long jump	Valentina Bogdanova (URS)	5.82	Wilhelmina Lust (NED)	5.63	Maire Osterdahl (FIN)	5.57
Shot put	Anna Andreyeva (URS)	14.32 CR	Klavdiya Tochenova (URS)	13.92	Micheline Ostermeyer (FRA)	13.37
Discus throw	Nina Dumbadze (URS)	48.03 CR	Rimma Shumskaya (URS)	42.25	Edera Cordiale (ITA)	41.57
Javelin throw	Natalya Smirnitskaya (URS)	47.55 CR	Herma Bauma (AUT)	43.87	Galina Zybina (URS)	42.75
Pentathlon	Arlette Ben Hamo (FRA)	3204	Bertha Crowther (GBR)	3048	Olga Modrachová (TCH)	3026

== Medal table ==
Rank	Nation	Gold	Silver	Bronze	Total
1	Great Britain (GBR)	8	3	6	17
2	Soviet Union (URS)	6	5	6	17
3	France (FRA)	4	8	3	15
4	Netherlands (NED)	4	3	1	8
5	Italy (ITA)	3	5	1	9
6	Czechoslovakia (TCH)	3	0	3	6
7	Iceland (ISL)	2	1	0	3
8	Sweden (SWE)	1	4	7	12
9	Finland (FIN)	1	3	5	9
10	Norway (NOR)	1	0	0	1
10	Switzerland (SUI)	1	0	0	1
12	Austria (AUT)	0	1	0	1
12	Yugoslavia (YUG)	0	1	0	1
14	Belgium (BEL)	0	0	1	1
14	Turkey (TUR)	0	0	1	1
Totals (15 entries)		34	34	34	102

== Participation ==
According to an unofficial count, 454 athletes from 21 countries participated in the event, in agreement with the official number of athletes, but three countries less than the official number of 24 as published.

- Austria (11)
- Belgium (48)
- Czechoslovakia (15)
- Denmark (10)
- Finland (20)
- France (56)
- Great Britain (48)
- Greece (12)
- Iceland (10)
- Italy (33)
- Luxembourg (5)
- Netherlands (21)
- Norway (17)
- Poland (3)
- Portugal (3)
- Soviet Union (34)
- Spain (2)
- Sweden (38)
- Switzerland (19)
- Turkey (10)
- Yugoslavia (39)
