= Luigi Paterlini =

Italian sprinter

Personal information
- Nationality: Italian
- Born: 9 August 1923
- Died: 23 October 1974 (aged 51)

Sport
- Sport: Sprinting
- Event: 4 × 400 metres relay
Medal record
Men's athletics
Representing Italy
European Championships
| Silver medal – second place | 1950 Brussels | 4×400 m |

Luigi Paterlini (9 August 1923 – 23 October 1974) was an Italian sprinter. He competed in the men's 4 × 400 metres relay at the 1948 Summer Olympics.
