= Jacques Lunis =

French sprinter

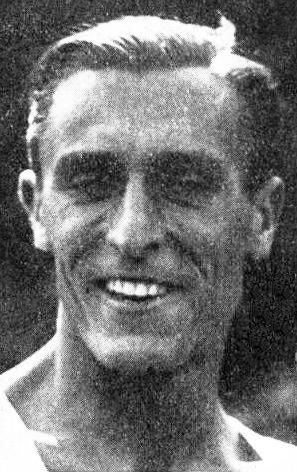
- Lunis in 1946

Medal record

Men's athletics

Olympic Games

Representing France
Silver medal – second place	1948 London	4×400 metre

European Championships
Gold medal – first place	1946 Oslo	4×400 m
Silver medal – second place	1946 Oslo	400 m
Silver medal – second place	1950 Brussels	400 m

Jacques Lunis (27 May 1923 – 2 November 2008) was a French athlete who competed mainly in the 400 metres.

He competed for a France in the 1948 Summer Olympics held in London, Great Britain in the 4 × 400 metre relay where he won the silver medal with his teammates Jean Kerebel, Francis Schewetta and Robert Chef d’Hotel.

== Competition record ==
Year	Competition	Venue	Position	Event	Notes
Representing France
1948	Olympics	London, United Kingdom	6th, Heat 4, Round 2	400 m	48.9
