= Rune Larsson (athlete) =

Swedish sprinter and hurdler

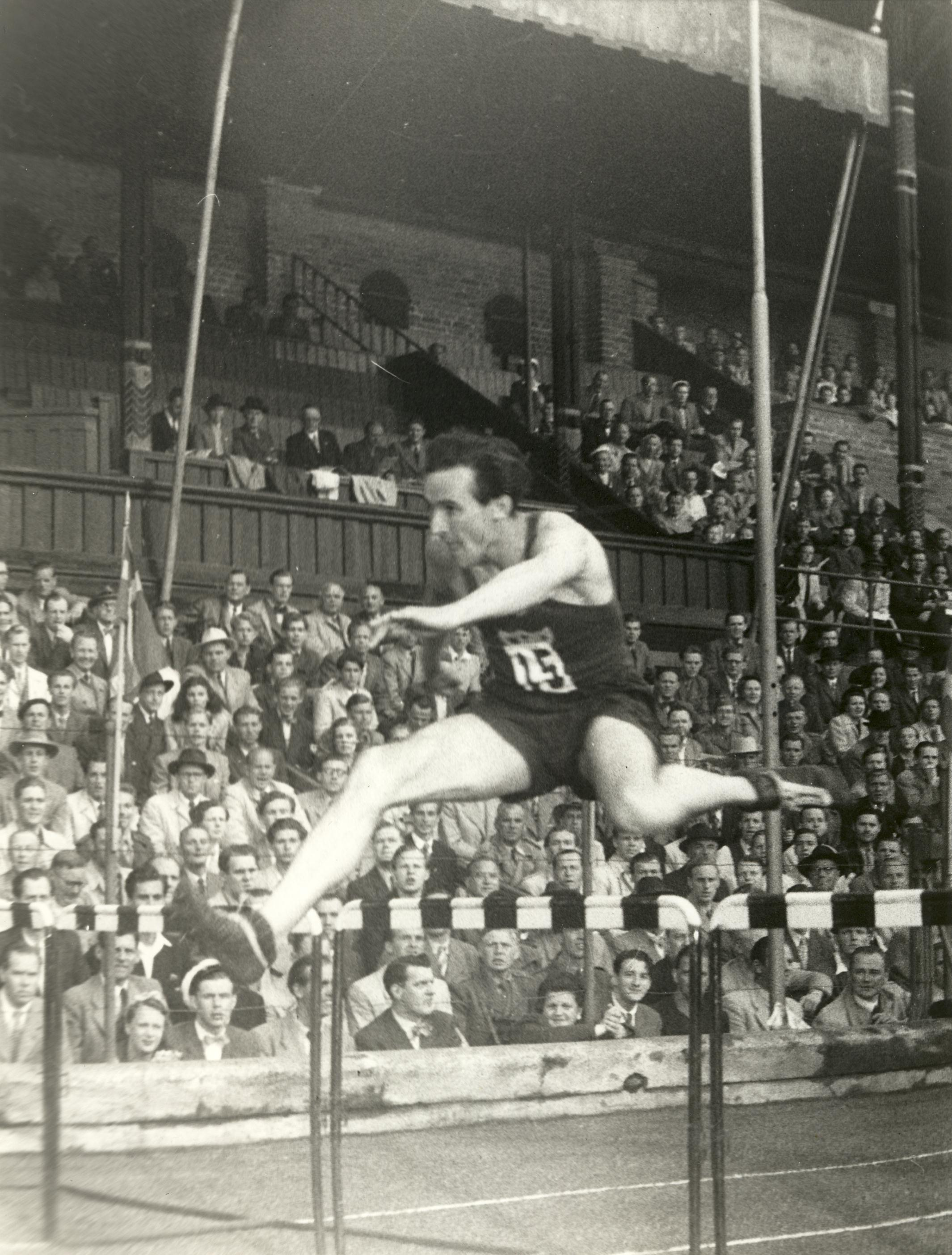
- Rune Larsson during the 1940s

Personal information
- Born: 17 June 1924 Stockholm, Sweden
- Died: 17 September 2016 (aged 92) Järfälla, Sweden
- Height: 1.78 m (5 ft 10 in)
- Weight: 70 kg (154 lb)

Sport
- Sport: Athletics
- Events: 400 m, 400 m hurles
- Club: UoIF Matteuspojkarna

Achievements and titles
- Personal bests: 400 m – 47.9 (1948); 400 mH – 51.9 (1948)
Medal record
Men's athletics
Representing Sweden
Olympic Games
Bronze medal – third place	1948 London	400 m hurdles
Bronze medal – third place	1948 London	4×400 m relay
European Championships
Bronze medal – third place	1946 Oslo	400 m hurdles
Bronze medal – third place	1950 Brussels	4×400 m relay

Karl Rune Larsson (17 June 1924 – 17 September 2016) was a Swedish sprinter and hurdler who specialized in 400 m events. He competed at the 1948 and 1952 Summer Olympics and won two bronze medals in 1948: in the 400 m hurdles and 4 × 400 m relay. He also won bronze medals in the same events at the European championships of 1946 and 1950. Larsson received the Svenska Dagbladet Gold Medal in 1951.

== Competition record ==
Year	Competition	Venue	Position	Event	Notes
Representing Sweden
1948	Olympics	London, United Kingdom	DNS, Heat 1, SF	400 m	

Preceded by Lennart Bergelin	Svenska Dagbladet Gold Medal; 1951	Succeeded by Valter Nyström
