= Leslie Lewis (sprinter) =

British sprinter (1924–1986)

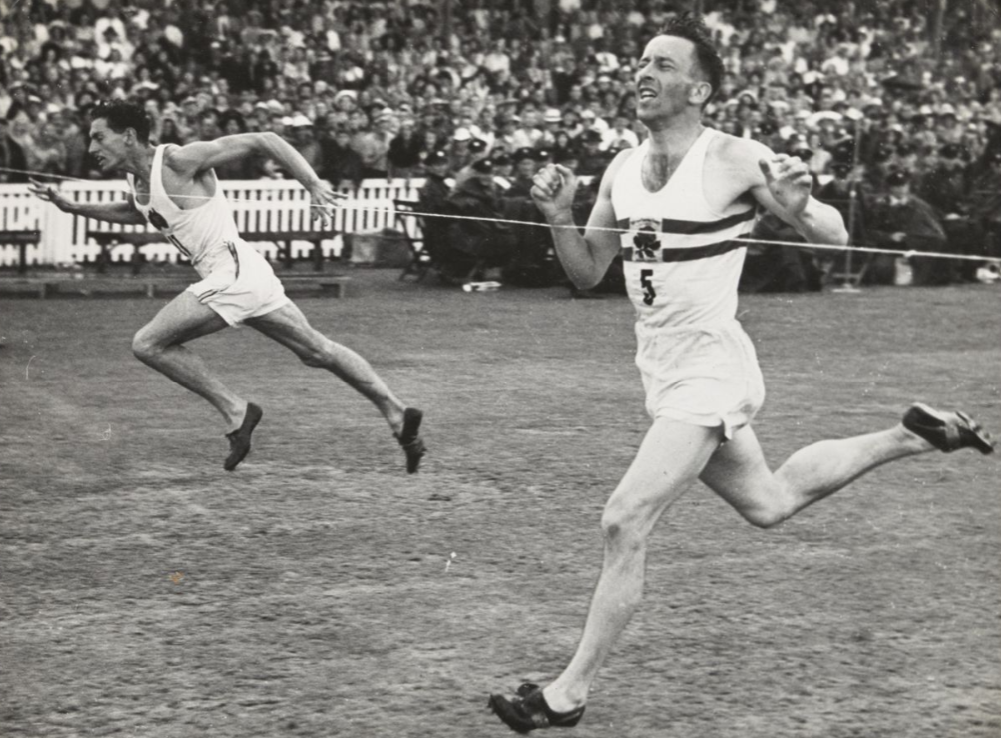
- 1950 Empire Games 440 yards final, Lewis (right) just loses out to Edwin Carr

Personal information
- Nationality: British (English)
- Born: 26 December 1924 Chertsey, England
- Died: 7 April 1986 (aged 61)
- Height: 174 cm (5 ft 9 in)
- Weight: 67 kg (148 lb)

Sport
- Sport: Athletics
- Event: 440 y/400 m
- Club: Walton AC
Medal record
Athletics
Representing Great Britain
European Championships
Gold medal – first place	1950 Brussels	4 × 400 m relay
Representing England
British Empire Games
Silver medal – second place	1950 Auckland	440 yards
Silver medal – second place	1950 Auckland	4 × 110 yd relay
Silver medal – second place	1950 Auckland	4 × 440 yd relay

Leslie Charles Lewis (26 December 1924 – 7 April 1986) was a British track and field athlete who competed in the 1948 Summer Olympics and in the 1952 Summer Olympics.

== Biography ==
Lewis was born in Chertsey, Surrey.

After finishing second behind Derek Pugh in the 440 yards event at the 1949 AAA Championships, Lewis became the British 440 yards champion after winning the British AAA Championships title at the 1950 AAA Championships

Lewis was part of the winning British 4 × 400 metres relay team at the 1950 European Athletics Championships, with Martin Pike, Angus Scott and Derek Pugh. In the 1950 British Empire Games in Auckland, New Zealand he won two silver medals in relays and an individual silver medal in the 440yards.

Lewis reached the podium twice more at the AAAs, losing out to Pugh again at the 1951 AAA Championships and second behind Arthur Wint at the 1952 AAA Championships.

He later migrated over from England to New Zealand and became a geography and PE teacher.

== Competition record ==
Year	Competition	Venue	Position	Event	Notes
Representing Great Britain
1948	Olympics	London, United Kingdom	4th, Heat 1, Round 2	400 m	49.2
