= List of Pan American Games medalists in athletics (women) =

This is the complete list of Pan American Games medalists in women's athletics from 1951 to 2023.

== Current program ==
=== 60 metres ===
Games	Gold		Silver		Bronze	
1955	Bertha Díaz; Cuba	7.5A	Isabelle Daniels; United States	7.6A	Mabel Landry; United States	7.6A
1959	Isabelle Daniels; United States	7.4	Barbara Jones; United States	7.4	Carlota Gooden; Panama	7.4

=== 100 metres ===
Games	Gold		Silver		Bronze	
1951	Julia Sánchez; Peru	12.2	Jean Patton; United States	12.3	Lilián Heinz; Argentina	12.7
1955	Barbara Jones; United States	11.90A	Mae Faggs; United States	12.07A	María Luisa Castelli; Argentina	12.38A
1959	Lucinda Williams; United States	12.1	Wilma Rudolph; United States	12.3	Carlota Gooden; Panama	12.3
1963	Edith McGuire; United States	11.65	Miguelina Cobián; Cuba	11.69	Marilyn White; United States	11.85
1967	Barbara Ferrell; United States	11.59	Miguelina Cobián; Cuba	11.69	Irene Piotrowski; Canada	11.78
1971	Iris Davis; United States	11.25w	Stephanie Berto; Canada	11.40w	Silvia Chivás; Cuba	11.47w
1975	Pamela Jiles; United States	11.38A	Patty Loverock; Canada	11.41A	Marjorie Bailey; Canada	11.42A
1979	Evelyn Ashford; United States	11.07	Brenda Morehead; United States	11.11	Angella Taylor; Canada	11.36
1983	Esmeralda García; Brazil	11.31	Jackie Washington; United States	11.33	Luisa Ferrer; Cuba	11.38
1987	Gail Devers; United States	11.14	Diane Williams; United States	11.25	Pauline Davis; Bahamas	11.47
1991	Liliana Allen; Cuba	11.39	Chryste Gaines; United States	11.46	Beverly McDonald; Jamaica	11.52
1995	Chryste Gaines; United States	11.05w	Liliana Allen; Cuba	11.16w	Heather Samuel; Antigua and Barbuda	11.33w
1999	Chandra Sturrup; Bahamas	11.10	Angela Williams; United States	11.16	Peta-Gaye Dowdie; Jamaica	11.20
2003	Lauryn Williams; United States	11.12	Angela Williams; United States	11.15	Liliana Allen; Mexico	11.28
2007	Mikele Barber; United States	11.02 GR	Mechelle Lewis; United States	11.24	Chandra Sturrup; Bahamas	11.29
2011	Rosângela Santos; Brazil	11.22 PB	Barbara Pierre; United States	11.25	Shakera Reece; Barbados	11.26 NR
2015	Sherone Simpson; Jamaica	10.95	Ángela Tenorio; Ecuador	10.99 AR	Barbara Pierre; United States	11.01
2019	Elaine Thompson; Jamaica	11.18	Michelle-Lee Ahye; Trinidad and Tobago	11.27	Vitória Cristina Rosa; Brazil	11.30
2023	Yunisleidy García; Cuba	11.36	Jasmine Abrams; Guyana	11.52	Michelle-Lee Ahye; Trinidad and Tobago	11.53

=== 200 metres ===
Games	Gold		Silver		Bronze	
1951	Jean Patton; United States	25.3	Nell Jackson; United States	25.7	Adriana Millard; Chile	26.1
1959	Lucinda Williams; United States	24.2	Isabelle Daniels; United States	24.8	Sally McCallum; Canada	25.1
1963	Vivian Brown; United States	23.9	Miguelina Cobián; Cuba	24.0	Lorraine Dunn; Panama	24.7
1967	Wyomia Tyus; United States	23.78w	Barbara Ferrell; United States	23.83w	Miguelina Cobián; Cuba	23.89w
1971	Stephanie Berto; Canada	23.57	Fulgencia Romay; Cuba	23.70	Esther Stroy; United States	23.82
1975	Chandra Cheeseborough; United States	22.77A	Pamela Jiles; United States	22.81A	Silvina Pereira; Brazil	23.17A
1979	Evelyn Ashford; United States	22.24w	Angella Taylor; Canada	22.74w	Merlene Ottey; Jamaica	22.79w
1983	Randy Givens; United States	23.14	LaShon Nedd; United States	23.39	Luisa Ferrer; Cuba	23.39
1987	Gwen Torrence; United States	22.52w	Randy Givens; United States	22.71w	Pauline Davis; Bahamas	22.99w
1991	Liliana Allen; Cuba	23.11	Ximena Restrepo; Colombia	23.16	Merlene Frazer; Jamaica	23.48
1995	Liliana Allen; Cuba	22.73	Dahlia Duhaney; Jamaica	23.03	Omegia Keeys; United States	23.24
1999	Debbie Ferguson; Bahamas	22.83	Lucimar de Moura; Brazil	23.03	Felipa Palacios; Colombia	23.05
2003	Roxana Díaz; Cuba	22.69	Cydonie Mothersille; Cayman Islands	22.86	Allyson Felix; United States	22.93
2007	Roxana Díaz; Cuba	22.90	Sheri-Ann Brooks; Jamaica	22.92	Sherry Fletcher; Grenada	22.96
2011	Ana Cláudia Lemos; Brazil	22.76	Simone Facey; Jamaica	22.86 PB	Mariely Sánchez; Dominican Republic	23.02 NR
2015	Kaylin Whitney; United States	22.65	Kyra Jefferson; United States	22.72	Simone Facey; Jamaica	22.74
2019	Shelly-Ann Fraser-Pryce; Jamaica	22.43 GR	Vitória Cristina Rosa; Brazil	22.62	Tynia Gaither; Bahamas	22.76
2023	Marileidy Paulino; Dominican Republic	22.74	Yunisleidy García; Cuba	23.33	Ana Azevedo; Brazil	23.52

=== 400 metres ===
Games	Gold		Silver		Bronze	
1971	Marilyn Neufville; Jamaica	52.34	Carmen Trustée; Cuba	52.89	Yvonne Saunders; Jamaica	53.13
1975	Joyce Yakubowich; Canada	51.62A	Debra Sapenter; United States	52.22A	Lorna Forde; Barbados	52.36A
1979	Sharon Dabney; United States	51.81	June Griffith; Guyana	51.81	Patricia Jackson; United States	52.32
1983	Charmaine Crooks; Canada	51.49	Ana Fidelia Quirot; Cuba	51.83	Esther Gabriel; United States	52.45
1987	Ana Fidelia Quirot; Cuba	50.27	Jillian Richardson; Canada	50.35	Denean Howard; United States	50.72
1991	Ana Fidelia Quirot; Cuba	49.61	Ximena Restrepo; Colombia	50.14	Jearl Miles; United States	50.82
1995	Julia Duporty; Cuba	50.77	Nancy McLeón; Cuba	51.81	Flirtisha Harris; United States	52.51
1999	Ana Guevara; Mexico	50.91	Michelle Collins; United States	51.21	Claudine Williams; Jamaica	51.58
2003	Ana Guevara; Mexico	50.36	Hazel-Ann Regis; Grenada	51.56	Aliann Pompey; Guyana	52.06
2007	Ana Guevara; Mexico	50.34	Christine Amertil; Bahamas	50.99	Indira Terrero; Cuba	51.09
2011	Jennifer Padilla; Colombia	51.53 PB	Daisurami Bonne; Cuba	51.69 PB	Geisa Coutinho; Brazil	51.87
2015	Kendall Baisden; United States	51.27	Shakima Wimbley; United States	51.36	Kineke Alexander; Saint Vincent and the Grenadines	51.50
2019	Shericka Jackson; Jamaica	50.73	Paola Morán; Mexico	51.02 PB	Courtney Okolo; United States	51.22
2023	Martina Weil; Chile	51.48	Nicole Caicedo; Ecuador	51.76	Evelis Aguilar; Colombia	51.95

=== 800 metres ===
Games	Gold		Silver		Bronze	
1963	Abby Hoffman; Canada	2:10.27	Leah Bennett Ferris; United States	2:13.79	Noreen Deuling; Canada	2:14.98
1967	Madeline Manning; United States	2:02.35	Doris Brown; United States	2:02.95	Abby Hoffman; Canada	2:04.82
1971	Abby Hoffman; Canada	2:05.54	Doris Brown; United States	2:05.90	Penny Werthner; Canada	2:06.32
1975	Kathy Weston; United States	2:04.93A	Abby Hoffman; Canada	2:06.93A	Joan Wenzel; Canada	2:06.93A
1979	Essie Kelley; United States	2:01.2a	Julie Brown; United States	2:01.2a	Aurelia Pentón; Cuba	2:02.1a
1983	Nery McKeen; Cuba	2:02.20	Ranza Clark; Canada	2:02.44	Alejandra Ramos; Cuba	2:03.65
1987	Ana Fidelia Quirot; Cuba	1:59.06	Delisa Floyd; United States	2:00.54	Soraya Telles; Brazil	2:00.56
1991	Ana Fidelia Quirot; Cuba	1:58.71	Alisa Hill; United States	1:59.99	Celeste Halliday; United States	2:01.41
1995	Meredith Rainey; United States	1:59.44	Luciana Mendes; Brazil	2:01.71	Letitia Vriesde; Suriname	2:02.25
1999	Letitia Vriesde; Suriname	1:59.95	Zulia Calatayud; Cuba	2:00.67	Meredith Rainey-Valmon; United States	2:01.51
2003	Adriana Muñoz; Cuba	2:02.96	Marian Burnett; Guyana	2:03.58	Christiane Ritz; Brazil	2:04.37
2007	Diane Cummins; Canada	1:59.75	Rosibel García; Colombia	2:00.02	Zulia Calatayud; Cuba	2:00.34
2011	Adriana Muñoz; Cuba	2:04.08	Gabriela Medina; Mexico	2:04.41	Rosibel García; Colombia	2:04.45
2015	Melissa Bishop; Canada	1:59.52	Alysia Montaño; United States	1:59.76	Flávia de Lima; Brazil	2:00.40
2019	Natoya Goule; Jamaica	2:01.26	Rose Mary Almanza; Cuba	2:01.64	Déborah Rodríguez; Uruguay	2:01.66
2023	Sahily Diago; Cuba	2:02.71	Déborah Rodríguez; Uruguay	2:02.88	Rose Mary Almanza; Cuba	2:03.68

=== 1500 metres ===
Games	Gold		Silver		Bronze	
1975	Jan Merrill; United States	4:18.32A	Thelma Wright; Canada	4:22.32A	Abby Hoffman; Canada	4:26.25A
1979	Mary Decker; United States	4:05.7a	Julie Brown; United States	4:06.4a	Penny Bales; Canada	4:14.8a
1983	Ranza Clark; Canada	4:16.18	Cindy Bremser; United States	4:17.67	Missy Kane; United States	4:21.39
1987	Linda Sheskey; United States	4:07.84	Debbie Bowker; Canada	4:08.43	Brit McRoberts; Canada	4:11.35
1991	Alisa Hill; United States	4:13.12	Letitia Vriesde; Suriname	4:16.75	Sarah Howell; Canada	4:17.55
1995	Sarah Thorsett; United States	4:21.84	Sarah Howell; Canada	4:22.10	Marta Orellana; Argentina	4:22.44
1999	Marla Runyan; United States	4:16.86	Leah Pells; Canada	4:16.86	Stephanie Best; United States	4:18.44
2003	Adriana Muñoz; Cuba	4:09.57	Mary Jayne Harrelson; United States	4:09.72	Mardrea Hyman; Jamaica	4:10.08
2007	Juliana Paula dos Santos; Brazil	4:13.36	Mary Jayne Harrelson; United States	4:15.24	Rosibel García; Colombia	4:15.78
2011	Adriana Muñoz; Cuba	4:26.09	Rosibel García; Colombia	4:26.78	Malindi Elmore; Canada	4:27.57
2015	Muriel Coneo; Colombia	4:09.05	Nicole Sifuentes; Canada	4:09.13	Sasha Gollish; Canada	4:10.11
2019	Nikki Hiltz; United States	4:07.14	Aisha Praught; Jamaica	4:08.26	Alexa Efraimson; United States	4:08.63
2023	Joselyn Brea; Venezuela	4:11.80	Daily Cooper; Cuba	4:11.86	Emily Mackay; United States	4:12.02

=== 3000 metres ===
Games	Gold		Silver		Bronze	
1979	Jan Merrill; United States	8:53.6a	Julie Brown; United States	8:59.9a	Geri Fitch; Canada	9:35.7a
1983	Joan Benoit; United States	9:14.19	Brenda Webb; United States	9:28.69	Mónica Regonesi; Chile	9:41.87
1987	Mary Knisely; United States	9:06.75	Angela Chalmers; Canada	9:14.48	Leslie Seymour; United States	9:19.26
1991	Sabrina Dornhoefer; United States	9:16.15	Maricarmen Díaz; Mexico	9:19.05	Carmem de Oliveira; Brazil	9:19.18

=== 5000 metres ===
Games	Gold		Silver		Bronze	
1995	Adriana Fernández; Mexico	15:46.32	Maricarmen Díaz; Mexico	15:46.43	Carol Montgomery; Canada	15:46.80
1999	Adriana Fernández; Mexico	15:56.57	Bertha Sánchez; Colombia	15:59.04	Blake Phillips; United States	15:59.77
2003	Adriana Fernández; Mexico	15:30.65	Nora Rocha; Mexico	15:40.98	Nicole Jefferson; United States	15:42.40
2007	Megan Metcalfe; Canada	15:35.78	Catherine Ferrell; United States	15:42.01	Nora Rocha; Mexico	15:43.80
2011	Marisol Romero; Mexico	16:24.08	Cruz da Silva; Brazil	16:29.75	Inés Melchor; Peru	16:41.50
2015	Juliana Paula dos Santos; Brazil	15:45.97	Brenda Flores; Mexico	15:47.19	Kellyn Taylor; United States	15:52.78
2019	Laura Galván; Mexico	15:35:47	Jessica O'Connell; Canada	15:36:08	Kim Conley; United States	15:36:95
2023	Joselyn Brea; Venezuela	16:04.12	Taylor Werner; United States	16:06.48	Julie-Anne Staehli; Canada	16:06.75

=== 10,000 metres ===
Games	Gold		Silver		Bronze	
1987	Marty Cooksey; United States	33:00.00	Nancy Tinari; Canada	33:02.41	Patty Murray; United States	33:38.12
1991	Maricarmen Díaz; Mexico	34:21.13	Lisa Harvey; Canada	34:25.52	María Luisa Servín; Mexico	34:55.94
1995	Carmem de Oliveira; Brazil	33:10.19	Carol Montgomery; Canada	33:13.58	Maricarmen Díaz; Mexico	33:14.94
1999	Nora Rocha; Mexico	32:56.51	Stella Castro; Colombia	33:05.97	Tina Connelly; Canada	33:27.87
2003	Adriana Fernández; Mexico	33:16.05	Yudelkis Martínez; Cuba	33:55.12	Bertha Sánchez; Colombia	33:56.17
2007	Sara Slattery; United States	32:54.41	Dulce María Rodríguez; Mexico	32:56.75	Lucelia Peres; Brazil	33:19.48
2011	Marisol Romero; Mexico	34:07:24	Cruz da Silva; Brazil	34:22:44	Yolanda Caballero; Colombia	34:39:14
2015	Brenda Flores; Mexico	32:41.33	Desiree Davila; United States	32:43.99	Lanni Marchant; Canada	32:46.03
2019	Natasha Wodak; Canada	31:55.17 GR	Risper Gesabwa; Mexico	31.59.00 PB	Rachel Cliff; Canada	32:13.34
2023	Luz Mery Rojas; Peru	33:12.19	Laura Galván; Mexico	33:15.85	Ednah Kurgat; United States	33:16.61

=== Marathon ===
Games	Gold		Silver		Bronze	
1987	María del Carmen Cárdenas; Mexico	2:52:06	Debbie Warner; United States	2:54:49	Maribel Durruty; Cuba	2:56:21
1991	Olga Appell; Mexico	2:43:36	Maribel Durruty; Cuba	2:46:04	Emperatriz Wilson; Cuba	2:48:48
1995	María Trujillo; United States	2:43:56	Jennifer Martin; United States	2:44:10	Emma Cabrera; Mexico	2:46:36
1999	Érika Olivera; Chile	2:37:41	Iglandini González; Colombia	2:40:06	Viviany de Oliveira; Brazil	2:40:55
2003	Márcia Narloch; Brazil	2:39:54	Mariela González; Cuba	2:42:55	Érika Olivera; Chile	2:44:52
2007	Mariela González; Cuba	2:43:11	Márcia Narloch; Brazil	2:45:10	Sirlene Pinho; Brazil	2:47:36
2011	Adriana Aparecida; Brazil	2:36:37	Madaí Pérez; Mexico	2:38:03	Gladys Tejeda; Peru	2:42:09
2015	Adriana Aparecida; Brazil	2:35:40	Lindsay Flanagan; United States	2:36:30	Rachel Hannah; Canada	2:41:06
2019	Gladys Tejeda; Peru	2:30:55 GR	Bethany Sachtleben; United States	2:31:20 PB	Angie Orjuela; Colombia	2:32:27 PB
2023	Citlali Cristian; Mexico	2:27:12	Florencia Borelli; Argentina	2:27:29	Gladys Tejeda; Peru	2:30:39

=== 80 metres hurdles ===
Games	Gold		Silver		Bronze	
1951	Eliana Gaete; Chile	11.9	Marion Huber; Chile	12.0	Nancy Phillips; United States	12.1
1955	Eliana Gaete; Chile	11.7A	Bertha Díaz; Cuba	11.8A	Wanda dos Santos; Brazil	11.8A
1959	Bertha Díaz; Cuba	11.2	Wanda dos Santos; Brazil	11.5	Marian Munroe; Canada	11.5
1963	Jo Ann Terry; United States	11.37	Jenny Wingerson; Canada	11.48	Wanda dos Santos; Brazil	11.50
1967	Cherrie Sherrard; United States	10.83	Mamie Rallins; United States	10.85	Thora Best; Trinidad and Tobago	10.98

=== 100 metres hurdles ===
Games	Gold		Silver		Bronze	
1971	Patty Johnson; United States	13.19w	Marlene Elejarde; Cuba	13.54w	Penny May; Canada	13.70w
1975	Edith Noeding; Peru	13.56A	Deby LaPlante; United States	13.68A	Marlene Elejardee; Cuba	13.80A
1979	Deby LaPlante; United States	12.90w	Sharon Lane; Canada	13.56w	Grisel Machado; Cuba	13.60w
1983	Benita Fitzgerald; United States	13.16	Kim Turner; United States	13.39	Elida Aveillé; Cuba	13.41
1987	LaVonna Martin; United States	12.81	Stephanie Hightower; United States	12.82	Aliuska López; Cuba	12.91
1991	Aliuska López; Cuba	12.99	Odalys Adams; Cuba	13.06	Arnita Myricks; United States	13.23
1995	Aliuska López; Cuba	12.68w	Donalda Duprey; Canada	13.16w	Odalys Adams; Cuba	13.17w
1999	Aliuska López; Cuba	12.76	Maurren Maggi; Brazil	12.86	Miesha McKelvy; United States	12.91
2003	Brigitte Foster; Jamaica	12.67	Perdita Felicien; Canada	12.70	Lacena Golding-Clarke; Jamaica	12.79
2007	Delloreen Ennis-London; Jamaica	12.65	Perdita Felicien; Canada	12.65	Angela Whyte; Canada	12.72
2011	Yvette Lewis; United States	12.81	Angela Whyte; Canada	13.09	Lina Flórez; Colombia	13.09
2015	Queen Harrison; United States	12.52	Tenaya Jones; United States	12.84	Nikkita Holder; Canada	12.85
2019	Andrea Vargas; Costa Rica	12.82	Chanel Brissett; United States	12.99	Megan Simmonds; Jamaica	13.01
2023	Andrea Vargas; Costa Rica	13.06	Greisys Roble; Cuba	13.09	Alaysha Johnson; United States	13.19

=== 400 metres hurdles ===
Games	Gold		Silver		Bronze	
1983	Judi Brown; United States	56.03	Sharrieffa Barksdale; United States	56.09	Gwen Wall; Canada	56.93
1987	Judi Brown-King; United States	54.23	Sandra Farmer; Jamaica	54.59	LaTanya Sheffield; United States	56.15
1991	Lency Montelier; Cuba	57.34	Deon Hemmings; Jamaica	57.54	Tonja Buford; United States	57.81
1995	Kim Batten; United States	54.74	Tonja Buford; United States	55.05	Lency Montelier; Cuba	55.74
1999	Daimí Pernía; Cuba	53.44	Andrea Blackett; Barbados	53.98	Michelle Johnson; United States	54.22
2003	Joanna Hayes; United States	54.77	Daimí Pernía; Cuba	55.10	Andrea Blackett; Barbados	55.24
2007	Sheena Johnson; United States	54.64	Nickiesha Wilson; Jamaica	54.94	Nicole Leach; United States	54.97
2011	Princesa Oliveros; Colombia	56.26	Lucy Jaramillo; Ecuador	56.95	Yolanda Osana; Dominican Republic	57.08
2015	Shamier Little; United States	55.50	Sarah Wells; Canada	56.17	Déborah Rodríguez; Uruguay	56.41
2019	Sage Watson; Canada	55.16 SB	Anna Cockrell; United States	55.50	Rushell Clayton; Jamaica	55.53
2023	Gianna Woodruff; Panama	56.44	Ewellyn Santos; Brazil	57.18	Daniela Rojas; Costa Rica	57.41

=== 3000 metres steeplechase ===
Games	Gold		Silver		Bronze	
2007	Sabine Heitling; Brazil	9:51.13	Talis Apud; Mexico	9:55.43	Zenaide Vieira; Brazil	9:55.71
2011	Sara Hall; United States	10:03.16	Ángela Figueroa; Colombia	10:10.14	Sabine Heitling; Brazil	10:10.98
2015	Ashley Higginson; United States	9:48.12	Shalaya Kipp; United States	9:49.96	Geneviève Lalonde; Canada	9:53.03
2019	Geneviève Lalonde; Canada	9:41.45 GR	Marisa Howard; United States	9:43.78	Belén Casetta; Argentina	9:44.46
2023	Belén Casetta; Argentina	9:39.47	Alycia Butterworth; Canada	9:40.86	Tatiane da Silva; Brazil	9:41.29

=== 10,000 metres walk ===
Games	Gold		Silver		Bronze	
1987	María Colín; Mexico	47:17.15	Ann Peel; Canada	47:17.97	Maryanne Torrellas; United States	47:35.13
1991	Graciela Mendoza; Mexico	46:41.56	Debbi Lawrence; United States	46:51.53	Maricela Chávez; Mexico	47:44.73
1995	Graciela Mendoza; Mexico	46:31.93	Michelle Rohl; United States	46:36.52	Francisca Martínez; Mexico	47:44.78

=== 20km road walk ===
Games	Gold		Silver		Bronze	
1999	Graciela Mendoza; Mexico	1:34:19	Rosario Sánchez; Mexico	1:34:46	Michelle Rohl; United States	1:35:22
2003	Victoria Palacios; Mexico	1:35:16	Rosario Sánchez; Mexico	1:35:21	Joanne Dow; United States	1:35:48
2007	Cristina López; El Salvador	1:38:59	Miriam Ramón; Ecuador	1:40:03	María Esther Sánchez; Mexico	1:41:47
2011	Jamy Franco; Guatemala	1:32:38	Mirna Ortiz; Guatemala	1:33:37	Ingrid Hernández; Colombia	1:34:06
2015	Lupita González; Mexico	1:29:24	Érica de Sena; Brazil	1:30:03	Paola Pérez; Ecuador	1:31:53
2019	Sandra Arenas; Colombia	1:28:03 GR	Kimberly García; Peru	1:29:00 SB	Érica de Sena; Brazil	1:30:34
2023	Kimberly García; Peru	—	Glenda Morejón; Ecuador	—	Evelyn Inga; Peru	—

=== 50km road walk ===
Games	Gold		Silver		Bronze	
2019	Johana Ordóñez; Ecuador	4:11:12 GR, SA	Mirna Ortiz; Guatemala	4:15:21	Paola Pérez; Ecuador	4:16:54

=== 4 × 100 metres relay ===
Games	Gold		Silver		Bronze	
1951	United States; Nell Jackson; Jean Patton; Dolores Dwyer; Janet Moreau	48.7	Chile; Adriana Millard; Hildegard Kreft; Betty Kretschmer; Eliana Gaete	49.3	Argentina; Olga Bianchi; Teresa Carvajal; Lilián Heinz; Ana María Fontán	49.8
1955	United States; Barbara Jones; Isabelle Daniels; Mae Faggs; Mabel Landry	47.12A	Argentina; Lilián Heinz; Lilián Buglia; María Luisa Castelli; Gladys Erbetta	47.27A	Chile; Elda Selamé; Eliana Gaete; Teresa Venegas; Betty Kretschmer	49.49A
1959	United States; Isabelle Daniels; Barbara Jones; Lucinda Williams; Wilma Rudolph	46.4	Panama; Carlota Gooden; Jean Holmes-Mitchell; Marcela Daniel; Silvia Hunte	48.2	Canada; Sally McCallum; Valerie Jerome; Heather Campbell; Maureen Rever	48.5
1963	United States; Marilyn White; Vivian Brown; Willye White; Norma Harris	45.72	Cuba; Fulgencia Romay; Miguelina Cobián; Irene Martínez; Nereida Borges	46.44 NR	Brazil; Leontina Santos; Erica Lopes da Silva; Edir Bragga Ribeiro; Inés Pimenta	48.18
1967	Cuba; Violetta Quesada; Marcia Garbey; Cristina Hechavarria; Miguelina Cobián	44.63	Canada; Irene Piotrowski; Jenny Meldrum; Judy Dallimore; Jan Maddin	45.56	Jamaica; Vilma Charlton; Una Morris; Audrey Reid; Carol Cummings	47.17
1971	United States; Iris Davis; Mattiline Render; Orien Brown; Pat Hawkins	44.59	Cuba; Marlene Elejarde; Carmen Valdés; Silvia Chivás; Fulgencia Romay	45.01	Colombia; Juana Mosquera; Elsy Rivas; Aida Ortíz; Ana Maquilón	45.99
1975	United States; Pamela Jiles; Brenda Morehead; Chandra Cheeseborough; Martha Watson	42.90A	Cuba; Marlene Elejarde; Fulgencia Romay; Silvia Chivás; Carmen Valdés	43.65A	Canada; Patty Loverock; Marjorie Bailey; Joanne McTaggart; Joyce Yakubowich	43.68A
1979	United States; Valerie Brisco; Chandra Cheeseborough; Brenda Morehead; Karen Hawkins	43.30	Jamaica; Leleith Hodges; Rosie Allwood; Carmetta Drummond; Merlene Ottey	44.18	Cuba; Eloína Echevarría; Isabel Taylor; Marta Zulueta; Silvia Chivás	46.26
1983	United States; Jackie Washington; Alice Jackson; Brenda Cliette; Randy Givens	43.21	Trinidad and Tobago; Esther Hope; Janice Bernard; Angela Williams; Maxine McMillan	44.63	Canada; Karen Nelson; Charmaine Crooks; Jillian Richardson; Tanya Brothers	44.77
1987	United States; Gail Devers; Michelle Finn-Burrell; Gwen Torrence; Sheila Echols	42.91	Cuba; Susana Armenteros; Eusebia Riquelme; Liliana Allen; Aliuska López	44.16	Brazil; Claudilea dos Santos; Cleide Amaral; Inês Ribeiro; Sheila de Oliveira	45.37
1991	Jamaica; Cheryl-Ann Phillips; Dahlia Duhaney; Beverly McDonald; Merlene Frazer	43.79	Cuba; Liliana Allen; Eusebia Riquelme; Julia Duporty; Idalmis Bonne	44.31	United States; Chryste Gaines; LaMonda Miller; Anita Howard; Arnita Myricks	44.62
1995	United States; Flirtisha Harris; Shantel Twiggs; Richelle Webb; Chryste Gaines	43.55	Cuba; Miriam Ferrer; Aliuska López; Liliana Allen; Dainelky Pérez	44.08	Colombia; Felipa Palacios; Mirtha Brock; Patricia Rodríguez; Elia Mera	44.10
1999	Jamaica; Peta-Gaye Dowdie; Kerry-Ann Richards; Aleen Bailey; Beverly Grant	42.62 GR	United States; Shelia Burrell; Passion Richardson; Angela Williams; Torri Edwards	43.27	Cuba; Misleidys Lazo; Idalia Hechavarría; Mercedes Carnesolta; Virgen Benavides	43.52
2003	United States; Angela Williams; Consuella Moore; Angela Daigle; Lauryn Williams	43.06	Cuba; Dainelky Pérez; Roxana Díaz; Virgen Benavides; Misleidys Lazo	43.40	Jamaica; Lacena Golding-Clarke; Judyth Kitson; Shellene Williams; Danielle Browning	43.71
2007	Jamaica; Sheri-Ann Brooks; Tracy-Ann Rowe; Aleen Bailey; Peta-Gaye Dowdie	43.58	United States; Shareese Woods; Mechelle Lewis; Alexis Weatherspoon; Mikele Barber	43.62	Cuba; Virgen Benavides; Roxana Díaz; Misleidys Lazo; Anay Tejeda	43.80
2011	Brazil; Ana Cláudia Silva; Vanda Gomes; Franciela Krasucki; Rosângela Santos	42.85 AR	United States; Kenyanna Wilson; Barbara Pierre; Yvette Lewis; Chastity Riggien	43.10	Colombia; Lina Flórez; Jennifer Padilla; Yomara Hinestroza; Norma González	43.44
2015	United States; Barbara Pierre; LaKeisha Lawson; Morolake Akinosun; Kaylin Whitney	42.58 GR	Jamaica; Samantha Henry-Robinson; Kerron Stewart; Schillonie Calvert; Simone Facey; Sherone Simpson	42.68	Canada; Crystal Emmanuel; Kimberly Hyacinthe; Jellisa Westney; Khamica Bingham	43.00
2019	Brazil; Andressa Fidelis; Vitória Cristina Rosa; Lorraine Martins; Rosângela Santos	43.04 SB	Canada; Khamica Bingham; Crystal Emmanuel; Ashlan Best; Leya Buchanan	43.37 SB	United States; Chanel Brissett; Twanisha Terry; Shania Collins; Lynna Irby	43.39
2023	Cuba; Laura Moreira; Enis Verdecia; Yarima García; Yunisleidy García; Jocelyn Echazabal *	43.72	Chile; Anaís Hernández; Martina Weil; Isidora Jiménez; Maria Ignacia Montt	44.19; SB	Dominican Republic; Liranyi Alonso; Marileidy Paulino; Martha Méndez; Anabel Medina; Darianny Jiménez *	44.32

=== 4 × 400 metres relay ===
Games	Gold		Silver		Bronze	
1971	United States; Cheryl Toussaint; Esther Stroy; Gwen Norman; Mavis Laing	3:32.45	Cuba; Carmen Trustée; Beatriz Castillo; Aurelia Pentón; Marcela Chibás	3:34.04	Jamaica; Yvonne Saunders; Ruth Williams; Marilyn Neufville; Beverly Franklin	3:34.05
1975	Canada; Joyce Yakubowich; Margaret McGowen; Rachelle Campbell; Joanne McTaggart	3:30.36A	United States; Debra Sapenter; Kathy Weston; Sharon Dabney; Pat Helms	3:30.64A	Cuba; Aurelia Pentón; Eia Cabreja; Asunción Acosta; Rosa López	3:31.65A
1979	United States; Essie Kelley; Sharon Dabney; Patricia Jackson; Rosalyn Bryant	3:29.4a	Cuba; Ana Luisa Guibert; Nery McKeen; Ana Fidelia Quirot; Aurelia Pentón	3:36.3a	Canada; Anne Mackie-Morelli; Jeanette Wood; Marita Payne; Micheline Racette	3:37.6a
1983	United States; Alice Jackson; Judi Brown; Easter Gabriel; Kelia Bolton	3:29.97	Canada; Christine Slythe; Gwen Wall; Charmaine Crooks; Jillian Richardson	3:30.24	Cuba; Mercedes Álvarez; Nery McKeen; Caridad Mayra Guerra; Ana Fidelia Quirot	3:30.76
1987	United States; Diane Dixon; Rochelle Stevens; Valerie Brisco-Hooks; Denean Howard	3:23.35	Canada; Jillian Richardson; Marita Payne; Charmaine Crooks; Molly Killingbeck	3:29.18	Jamaica; Sandie Richards; Ilrey Oliver; Vivienne Spence; Cathy Rattray	3:29.50
1991	United States; Jearl Miles; Maicel Malone; Natasha Kaiser; Tasha Downing	3:24.21	Cuba; Ana Fidelia Quirot; Nancy McLeón; Julia Duporty; Odalmis Limonta	3:24.91	Jamaica; Inez Turner; Vivienne Spence-Gardner; Sandie Richards; Cathy Rattray-Williams	3:28.33
1995	Cuba; Idalmis Bonne; Surella Morales; Nancy McLeón; Julia Duporty	3:27.45	United States; Trevia Williams; Terri Dendy; Flirtisha Harris; Crystal Irving	3:31.22	Colombia; Patricia Rodríguez; Elia Mera; Mirtha Brock; Felipa Palacios	3:38.54
1999	Cuba; Julia Duporty; Zulia Calatayud; Idalmis Bonne; Daimí Pernía	3:26.70	United States; Andrea Anderson; Shanelle Porter; Michelle Collins; Yulanda Nelson	3:27.50	Barbados; Joanne Durant; Andrea Blackett; Melissa Straker; Tanya Oxley	3:30.72
2003	United States; Me'Lisa Barber; Moushaumi Robinson; Julian Clay; DeeDee Trotter	3:27.76	Jamaica; Naleya Downer; Michelle Burgher; Novlene Williams; Allison Beckford	3:27.34	Brazil; Maria Almirão; Josiane Tito; Geisa Coutinho; Lucimar Teodoro	3:28.07
2007	Cuba; Aymée Martínez; Daimí Pernía; Zulia Calatayud; Indira Terrero	3:27.51	Mexico; Maria Teresa Rugerio; Gabriela E. Medina; Zudikey Rodríguez; Ana Guevara	3:27.75	United States; Debbie Dunn; Angel Perkins; Latonia Wilson; Nicole Leach	3:27.84
2011	Cuba; Aymée Martínez; Diosmely Peña; Susana Clement; Daisurami Bonne	3:28.09	Brazil; Joelma Sousa; Geisa Coutinho; Bárbara de Oliveira; Jailma de Lima	3:29.59	Colombia; Princesa Oliveros; Norma González; Evelis Aguilar; Jennifer Padilla	3:29.94 NR
2015	United States; Shamier Little; Kyra Jefferson; Shakima Wimbley; Kendall Baisden; Alysia Montaño	3:25.68	Jamaica; Anastasia Le-Roy; Verone Chambers; Chrisann Gordon; Bobby-Gaye Wilkins	3:27.27	Canada; Brianne Theisen-Eaton; Taylor Sharpe; Sage Watson; Sarah Wells; Audrey Jean-Baptiste	3:27.74 SB
2019	United States; Lynna Irby; Jaide Stepter; Anna Cockrell; Courtney Okolo	3:26.46	Canada; Natassha McDonald; Aiyanna Stiverne; Kyra Constantine; Sage Watson	3:27.01	Jamaica; Stephanie McPherson; Tiffany James; Natoya Goule; Roniesha McGregor	3:27.61
2023	Cuba; Zurian Hechavarría; Rose Mary Almanza; Sahily Diago; Lisneidy Veitía	3:33.15	Dominican Republic; Mariana Pérez; Anabel Medina; Franshina Martínez; Marileidy Paulino	3:34.27	Brazil; Anny de Bassi; Letícia Nonato; Jainy dos Santos; Tiffani Marinho	3:34.80

=== High jump ===
Games	Gold		Silver		Bronze	
1951	Jacinta Sandiford; Ecuador	1.46	Lucy López; Chile	1.46	Elizabeth Müller; Brazil	1.46
1955	Mildred McDaniel; United States	1.685A	Deyse de Castro; Brazil	1.59A	Verneda Thomas; United States	1.59A
1959	Ann Marie Flynn; United States	1.61	Renata Friedrichs; Chile Alice Whitty; Canada	1.495	None awarded (tie for silver)	
1963	Eleanor Montgomery; United States	1.68	Dianne Gerace; Canada	1.65	Patsy Callender; United States	1.62
1967	Eleanor Montgomery; United States	1.78	Susan Nigh; Canada	1.72	Feransetta Parham; United States	1.69
1971	Debbie Brill; Canada	1.85	Audrey Reid; Jamaica	1.75	Andrea Bruce; Jamaica	1.70
1975	Joni Huntley; United States	1.89A	Louise Walker; Canada	1.86A	Andrea Bruce; Jamaica	1.83A
1979	Louise Ritter; United States	1.93	Pam Spencer; United States	1.87	Debbie Brill; Canada	1.85
1983	Coleen Sommer; United States	1.91	Silvia Costa; Cuba	1.88	Joni Huntley; United States	1.82
1987	Coleen Sommer; United States	1.96	Silvia Costa; Cuba	1.92	Mazel Thomas; Jamaica	1.88
1991	Ioamnet Quintero; Cuba	1.88	María del Carmen García; Cuba	1.85	Jan Wohlschlag; United States	1.80
1995	Ioamnet Quintero; Cuba	1.94	Silvia Costa; Cuba	1.91	Angie Bradburn; United States	1.91
1999	Solange Witteveen; Argentina	1.88	Luciane Dambacher; Brazil	1.85	Nicole Forrester; Canada	1.85
2003	Juana Arrendel; Dominican Republic	1.94	Romary Rifka; Mexico	1.94	Yarianny Argüelles; Cuba	1.89
2007	Romary Rifka; Mexico	1.95	Nicole Forrester; Canada	1.95	Levern Spencer; Saint Lucia	1.87
2011	Lesyani Mayor; Cuba	1.89	Marielys Rojas; Venezuela	1.89	Romary Rifka; Mexico	1.89
2015	Levern Spencer; Saint Lucia	1.94	Priscilla Frederick; Antigua and Barbuda	1.91	Akela Jones; Barbados	1.91
2019	Levern Spencer; Saint Lucia	1.87	Priscilla Frederick; Antigua and Barbuda	1.87	Kimberly Williamson; Jamaica	1.84
2023	Rachel McCoy; United States	1.87	Jennifer Rodríguez; Colombia	1.84	Marisabel Senyu; Dominican Republic	1.81

=== Pole vault ===
Games	Gold		Silver		Bronze	
1999	Alejandra García; Argentina	4.30	Kellie Suttle; United States	4.25	Déborah Gyurcsek; Uruguay	4.15
2003	Melissa Mueller; United States	4.40	Carolina Torres; Chile	4.30	Stephanie McCann; Canada	4.20
2007	Fabiana Murer; Brazil	4.60	April Steiner; United States	4.40	Yarisley Silva; Cuba	4.30
2011	Yarisley Silva; Cuba	4.75	Fabiana Murer; Brazil	4.70	Becky Holliday; United States	4.30
2015	Yarisley Silva; Cuba	4.85	Fabiana Murer; Brazil	4.80	Jenn Suhr; United States	4.60
2019	Yarisley Silva; Cuba	4.75 SB	Katie Nageotte; United States	4.70	Alysha Newman; Canada	4.55
2023	Bridget Williams; United States	4.60	Robeilys Peinado; Venezuela	4.55	Aslin Quiala; Cuba	4.40

=== Long jump ===
Games	Gold		Silver		Bronze	
1951	Betty Kretschmer; Chile	5.42	Lisa Peters; Chile	5.20	Wanda dos Santos; Brazil	5.18
1959	Annie Smith; United States	5.735	Margaret Matthews; United States	5.73	Willye White; United States	5.70
1963	Willye White; United States	6.15	Iris dos Santos; Brazil	5.65	Edith McGuire; United States	5.48
1967	Irene Martínez; Cuba	6.33	Gisela Vidal; Venezuela	6.20	Willye White; United States	6.17
1971	Brenda Eisler; Canada	6.43	Silvina Pereira; Brazil	6.35	Marina Samuells; Cuba	6.14
1975	Ana Alexander; Cuba	6.63A	Martha Watson; United States	6.57A	Kathy McMillan; United States	6.49A
1979	Kathy McMillan; United States	6.46	Ana Alexander; Cuba	6.31	Eloína Echevarría; Cuba	6.27
1983	Kathy McMillan; United States	6.70	Eloína Echevarría; Cuba	6.61	Pat Johnson; United States	6.33
1987	Jackie Joyner-Kersee; United States	7.45	Jennifer Innis; United States	6.85	Eloína Echevarría; Cuba	6.42
1991	Diane Guthrie; Jamaica	6.64	Eloína Echevarría; Cuba	6.60w	Julie Bright; United States	6.53w
1995	Niurka Montalvo; Cuba	6.89	Andrea Ávila; Argentina	6.52	Jackie Edwards; Bahamas	6.50
1999	Maurren Maggi; Brazil	6.59	Angie Brown; United States	6.51	Elva Goulbourne; Jamaica	6.41
2003	Alice Falaiye; Canada	6.43	Jackie Edwards; Bahamas	6.41	Yargelis Savigne; Cuba	6.40
2007	Maurren Maggi; Brazil	6.84	Keila Costa; Brazil	6.73	Yargelis Savigne; Cuba	6.66
2011	Maurren Maggi; Brazil	6.94	Shameka Marshall; United States	6.73	Caterine Ibargüen; Colombia	6.63
2015	Christabel Nettey; Canada	6.90	Bianca Stuart; Bahamas	6.69	Sha'Keela Saunders; United States	6.66
2019	Chantel Malone; British Virgin Islands	6.68	Keturah Orji; United States	6.66	Tissanna Hickling; Jamaica	6.59
2023	Natalia Linares; Colombia	6.66	Eliane Martins; Brazil	6.49	Tiffany Flynn; United States	6.40

=== Triple jump ===
Games	Gold		Silver		Bronze	
1995	Laiza Carrillo; Cuba	14.09	Niurka Montalvo; Cuba	13.90w	Andrea Ávila; Argentina	13.84w
1999	Yamilé Aldama; Cuba	14.77	Suzette Lee; Jamaica	14.09	Magdelín Martínez; Cuba	13.98
2003	Mabel Gay; Cuba	14.42	Yuliana Pérez; United States	13.99	Yusmay Bicet; Cuba	13.90
2007	Yargelis Savigne; Cuba	14.80	Keila Costa; Brazil	14.38	Mabel Gay; Cuba	14.26
2011	Caterine Ibargüen; Colombia	14.92	Yargelis Savigne; Cuba	14.36	Mabel Gay; Cuba	13.28
2015	Caterine Ibargüen; Colombia	15.08	Keila Costa; Brazil	14.50	Yosiris Urrutia; Colombia	14.38
2019	Yulimar Rojas; Venezuela	15.11 GR	Shanieka Ricketts; Jamaica	14.77 PB	Liadagmis Povea; Cuba	14.60
2023	Leyanis Pérez; Cuba	14.75	Liadagmis Povea; Cuba	14.41	Thea Lafond; Dominica	14.25

=== Shot put ===
Games	Gold		Silver		Bronze	
1951	Ingeborg Mello; Argentina	12.45	Vera Trezoitko; Brazil	11.59	Ingeborg Pfüller; Argentina	11.58
1959	Earlene Brown; United States	14.68	Sharon Shepherd; United States	13.48	Wanda Wejzgrowicz; United States	13.10
1963	Nancy McCredie; Canada	15.32	Cynthia Watt; United States	14.27	Sharon Shepherd; United States	14.10
1967	Nancy McCredie; Canada	15.18	Lynn Graham; United States	14.88	Maureen Dowds; Canada	14.35
1971	Lynn Graham; United States	15.76	Grecia Hamilton; Cuba	14.63	Rosa Molina; Chile	14.50
1975	María Elena Sarría; Cuba	18.03A	Hilda Ramírez; Cuba	17.28A	Lucette Moreau; Canada	16.98A
1979	María Elena Sarría; Cuba	18.81	Maren Seidler; United States	18.57	Carmen Ionesco; Canada	16.50
1983	María Elena Sarría; Cuba	19.34	Rosa Fernández; Cuba	17.39	Lorna Griffin; United States	16.61
1987	Ramona Pagel; United States	18.56	María Elena Sarría; Cuba	18.12	Belsy Laza; Cuba	18.06
1991	Belsy Laza; Cuba	18.87	Connie Price-Smith; United States	18.30	Ramona Pagel; United States	17.76
1995	Connie Price-Smith; United States	19.17	Ramona Pagel; United States	18.50	Yumileidi Cumbá; Cuba	18.47
1999	Connie Price-Smith; United States	19.06	Yumileidi Cumbá; Cuba	18.67	Teri Tunks; United States	18.03
2003	Yumileidi Cumbá; Cuba	19.31	Elisângela Adriano; Brazil	18.48	Fior Vásquez; Dominican Republic	18.14
2007	Misleydis González; Cuba	18.83	Yumileidi Cumbá; Cuba	18.28	Cleopatra Borel-Brown; Trinidad and Tobago	18.22
2011	Misleydis González; Cuba	18.57	Cleopatra Borel-Brown; Trinidad and Tobago	18.46	Michelle Carter; United States	18.09
2015	Cleopatra Borel; Trinidad and Tobago	18.67	Jillian Camarena-Williams; United States	18.65	Natalia Ducó; Chile	18.01
2019	Danniel Thomas-Dodd; Jamaica	19.55 GR	Brittany Crew; Canada	19.07 PB	Jessica Ramsey; United States	19.01 SB
2023	Sarah Mitton; Canada	19.19	Rosa Ramírez; Dominican Republic	17.99	Adelaide Aquilla; United States	17.73

=== Discus throw ===
Games	Gold		Silver		Bronze	
1951	Ingeborg Mello; Argentina	38.55	Ingeborg Pfüller; Argentina	37.19	Frances Kaszubski; United States	35.84
1955	Ingeborg Pfüller; Argentina	43.19A	Isabel Avellán; Argentina	40.06A	Alejandrina Herrera; Cuba	38.00A
1959	Earlene Brown; United States	49.31	Pamela Kurrell; United States	42.19	Marjorie Larney; United States	42.18
1963	Nancy McCredie; Canada	50.18	Ingeborg Pfüller; Argentina	47.83	Sharon Shepherd; United States	47.29
1967	Carol Moseke; United States	49.24	Carol Martin; Canada	47.94	Caridad Agüero; Cuba	46.68
1971	Carmen Romero; Cuba	57.20	María Betancourt; Cuba	51.76	Carol Martin; Canada	50.04
1975	Carmen Romero; Cuba	60.16A	María Betancourt; Cuba	58.52A	Jane Haist; Canada	53.12A
1979	Carmen Romero; Cuba	60.58	María Betancourt; Cuba	60.44	Carmen Ionesco; Canada	57.14
1983	Maritza Martén; Cuba	59.62	Lorna Griffin; United States	56.52	Penny Neer; United States	53.32
1987	Maritza Martén; Cuba	65.58	Hilda Ramos; Cuba	61.34	Connie Price; United States	59.52
1991	Bárbara Hechavarría; Cuba	63.50	Hilda Ramos; Cuba	63.38	Lacy Barnes; United States	60.32
1995	Maritza Martén; Cuba	61.22	Bárbara Hechavarría; Cuba	60.20	Kris Kuehl; United States	56.92
1999	Aretha Hill; United States	59.06	Kris Kuehl; United States	57.21	Anaelys Fernández; Cuba	56.32
2003	Aretha Hill; United States	63.30	Anaelys Fernández; Cuba	61.26	Yania Ferrales; Cuba	60.03
2007	Yarelys Barrios; Cuba	61.72	Yania Ferrales; Cuba	61.71	Elisângela Adriano; Brazil	60.27
2011	Yarelys Barrios; Cuba	66.40	Aretha Thurmond; United States	59.53	Denia Caballero; Cuba	58.63
2015	Denia Caballero; Cuba	65.39	Yaime Pérez; Cuba	64.99	Gia Lewis-Smallwood; United States	61.26
2019	Yaime Pérez; Cuba	66.58 GR	Fernanda Martins; Brazil	62.23	Denia Caballero; Cuba	60.46
2023	Izabela da Silva; Brazil	59.63	Andressa de Morais; Brazil	59.29	Samantha Hall; Jamaica	59.14

=== Hammer throw ===
Games	Gold		Silver		Bronze	
1995	Alex Givan; United States	58.92	María Eugenia Villamizar; Colombia	56.14	Sonja Fitts; United States	56.06
1999	Dawn Ellerbe; United States	65.36	Yipsi Moreno; Cuba	63.03	Caroline Wittrin; Canada	61.28
2003	Yipsi Moreno; Cuba	74.25	Yunaika Crawford; Cuba	69.57	Candice Scott; Trinidad and Tobago	69.06
2007	Yipsi Moreno; Cuba	75.20	Arasay Thondike; Cuba	68.70	Jennifer Dahlgren; Argentina	68.37
2011	Yipsi Moreno; Cuba	75.62	Sultana Frizell; Canada	70.11	Amber Campbell; United States	69.93
2015	Rosa Rodríguez; Venezuela	71.61	Amber Campbell; United States	71.22	Sultana Frizell; Canada	69.51
2019	Gwen Berry; United States	74.62	Brooke Andersen; United States	71.07	Rosa Rodríguez; Venezuela	69.48
2023	DeAnna Price; United States	72.34	Rosa Rodríguez; Venezuela	71.59	Kaila Butler; Canada	65.10

=== Javelin throw ===
Games	Gold		Silver		Bronze	
1951	Hortensia García; Mexico	39.45	Amelia Wood; United States	38.08	Berta Chiú; Mexico	37.78
1955	Karen Anderson; United States	49.15A	Estrella Puente; Uruguay	43.43A	Amelia Wershoven; United States	43.06A
1959	Marlene Ahrens; Chile	45.38	Marjorie Larney; United States	43.65	Amelia Wood; United States	42.96
1963	Marlene Ahrens; Chile	49.93	Frances Davenport; United States	47.22	Iris dos Santos; Brazil	35.51
1967	Barbara Friedrich; United States	53.26	RaNae Bair; United States	51.64	Jay Dahlgren; Canada	45.46
1971	Tomasa Núñez; Cuba	54.02	Sherry Calvert; United States	51.52	Roberta Brown; United States	50.94
1975	Sherry Calvert; United States	54.70A	María Beltrán; Cuba	54.36A	Beth Cannon; United States	48.64A
1979	María Caridad Colón; Cuba	62.30	Lynn Cannon; United States	56.18	Cathy Sulinski; United States	55.82
1983	María Caridad Colón; Cuba	63.76	Mayra Vila; Cuba	63.32	Marieta Riera; Venezuela	53.60
1987	Ivonne Leal; Cuba	63.70	María Caridad Colón; Cuba	61.66	Marieta Riera; Venezuela	57.10
1991	Dulce García; Cuba	64.78	Donna Mayhew; United States	58.44	Herminia Bouza; Cuba	56.70
1995	Xiomara Rivero; Cuba	63.92	Laverne Eve; Bahamas	61.26	Valerie Tulloch; Canada	60.58
1999	Osleidys Menéndez; Cuba	65.85	Xiomara Rivero; Cuba	62.46	Laverne Eve; Bahamas	61.24
2003	Kim Kreiner; United States	60.86	Laverne Eve; Bahamas	60.68	Osleidys Menéndez; Cuba	60.20
2007	Osleidys Menéndez; Cuba	62.34	Sonia Bisset; Cuba	60.68	Laverne Eve; Bahamas	58.10
2011	Alicia DeShasier; United States	58.01	Yainelis Ribeaux; Cuba	56.21	Yanet Cruz; Cuba	56.19
2015	Elizabeth Gleadle; Canada	62.83	Kara Winger; United States	61.44	Jucilene de Lima; Brazil	60.42
2019	Kara Winger; United States	64.92 SB	Elizabeth Gleadle; Canada	63.30	Ariana Ince; United States	62.32
2023	Flor Ruiz; Colombia	63.10	Rhema Otabor; Bahamas	60.54	Madelyn Harris; United States	60.06

=== Pentathlon ===
Games	Gold		Silver		Bronze	
1967	Pat Winslow; United States	4860	Jenny Wingerson; Canada	4724	Aída dos Santos; Brazil	4531
1971	Debbie Van Kiekebelt; Canada	4290	Penny May; Canada	4112	Aída dos Santos; Brazil	3887
1975	Diane Jones; Canada	4673A	Gale Fitzgerald; United States	4486A	Andrea Bruce; Jamaica	4391A
1979	Diane Jones-Konihowski; Canada	4605	Jodi Anderson; United States	4434	Jill Ross; Canada	4112

=== Heptathlon ===
Games	Gold		Silver		Bronze	
1983	Conceição Geremias; Brazil	6084	Cindy Greiner; United States	6068	Elida Aveillé; Cuba	5755
1987	Cindy Greiner; United States	6184	Connie Polman-Tuin; Canada	5862	Jolanda Jones; United States	5823
1991	DeDee Nathan; United States	5778	Sharon Hainer; United States	5770	Magalys García; Cuba	5690
1995	Jamie McNeair; United States	6266	Magalys García; Cuba	6055	DeDee Nathan; United States	5879
1999	Magalys García; Cuba	6290	Shelia Burrell; United States	6244	Nicole Haynes; United States	6000
2003	Tiffany Lott-Hogan; United States	6064	Nicole Haynes; Canada	5959	Magalys García; Cuba	5864
2007	Jessica Zelinka; Canada	6136	Gretchen Quintana; Cuba	6000	Lucimara Silvestre; Brazil	5873
2011	Lucimara Silvestre; Brazil	6133	Yasmiany Pedroso; Cuba	5710	Francia Manzanillo; Dominican Republic	5644
2015	Yorgelis Rodríguez; Cuba	6332	Heather Miller; United States	6178	Vanessa Spínola; Brazil	6035
2019	Adriana Rodríguez; Cuba	6113	Annie Kunz; United States	5990	Martha Araújo; Colombia	5925
2023	Erin Marsh; United States	5882	Alysbeth Félix; Puerto Rico	5665	Jordan Gray; United States	5494
