= 1950 USA Outdoor Track and Field Championships =

- Dates: June 23–25 (men); August 25–26 (women)
- Host city: College Park, Maryland (men); Freeport, Texas (women)
- Venue: Byrd Stadium (men); Hopper Field (women)

Pathe Highlights

The 1950 USA Outdoor Track and Field Championships decided the national champions in track and field for the United States. The men's competition took place between June 23–25 at Byrd Stadium on the campus of the University of Maryland in College Park, Maryland. The women's division held their championships separately on August 25–26 at the newly opened Hopper Field in Freeport, Texas.

The women's meet served as a qualifier to represent the U.S. in athletics at the 1951 Pan American Games.

The men's decathlon was held a week after the other men's events in Tulare, California, where Olympic champion Bob Mathias set his first world record on his home track. The women's pentathlon championship was held separately on October 15. The Marathon championships were run in October at the Yonkers Marathon.

== Results ==
=== Men track events ===
Event	Gold		Silver		Bronze	
100 meters	Arthur Bragg	10.4	Lloyd LaBeach Panama; Robert Tyler	10.4e 10.5e	James Golliday	10.5e
200 meters	Robert Tyler	21.1	Arthur Bragg	21.2	Lloyd LaBeach Panama; Douglas Fowlkes	21.4; NT
400 meters	George Rhoden Jamaica; Herbert McKenley Jamaica; Tom Cox	46.5; 47.2; 47.6	Wilbur Cunningham	48.0	John Voight	48.8
800 meters	Malvin Whitfield	1.51.8	William Brown	1.52.0	Roscoe Browne	1.53.4
1500 meters	John Twomey	3.51.3	Jim Newcomb	3.52.2	Alf Holmberg Sweden; Bob Karnes	3.53.2; 3.53.8
5000 meters	Fred Wilt	15.19.4	Richard Hart	15.28.6	William Stauffer	15.34.4
10,000 meters	Horace Ashenfelter	32.44.3	Robert Black	33.29.7	Sal Escoto, Jr	33.33.5
Marathon	John A. Kelley	2.45.55.3	Jesse Van Zant	2.46.03	Thomas Jones	2.48.01
110 meters hurdles	Richard Attlesey	13.6 CRm	Jim Gehrdes	13.9	Bill Fleming	14.1
200 m hurdles	William Flemming	23.6				
400 meters hurdles	Charley Moore	53.6	Don Halderman	54.5	Albin Rausch	54.7
3000 meters steeplechase	Warren Druetzler	9.33.6	Curtis Stone	9.36.7	Browning Ross	9.46.7
3000 m walk	Henry Laskau	13:09.6				

=== Men field events ===
Event	Gold		Silver		Bronze	
High jump	Jack Heintzman; Jack Razzetto; Virgil Severns; David Albritton	1.97 m (6 ft 5 1/2 in)				
Pole vault	Robert Richards	4.27 m (14 ft 0 in)	George Mattos; George Rasmussen; Robert Smith	4.27 m (14 ft 0 in)		
Long jump	James Holland	7.85 m (25 ft 9 in)	Jerome Biffle	7.66 m (25 ft 1 1/2 in)	Herb Hoskins	7.59 m (24 ft 10 3/4 in)
Triple jump	Gaylord Bryan	14.60 m (47 ft 10 3/4 in)	Sal Mazzoca	14.37 m (47 ft 1 1/2 in)	Jim Danielson	13.95 m (45 ft 9 in)
Shot put	James Fuchs	17.43 m (57 ft 2 in) =CR	Otis Chandler	16.76 m (54 ft 11 3/4 in)	George Ker	16.33 m (53 ft 6 3/4 in)
Discus Throw	Fortune Gordien	52.79 m (173 ft 2 in)	James Fuchs	51.48 m (168 ft 10 in)	Richard Doyle	49.89 m (163 ft 8 in)
Hammer throw	Samuel Felton	57.09 m (187 ft 3 in) CR	Gil Borjeson	54.24 m (177 ft 11 in)	Henry Dreyer	52.56 m (172 ft 5 in)
Javelin throw	Steve Seymour	69.76 m (228 ft 10 in)	William Miller	66.91 m (219 ft 6 in)	George Roseme	65.21 m (213 ft 11 in)
Pentathlon	Wilbur Ross	3277 pts				
All-around decathlon	Dale Keyser	5777 pts				
Weight throw for distance	Frank Berst	38 ft 10 1/2 in (11.84 m)				
Decathlon	Robert Mathias	8042 WR	Bill Albans	7361	Otey Scruggs	7084

=== Women track events ===
Event	Gold		Silver		Bronze	
50 meters	Dolores Dwyer	6.7	Jean Patton	NT	Janet Moreau	NT
100 meters	Jean Patton	13.3	Dolores Dwyer	NT	Janet Moreau	NT
200 meters	Nell Jackson; Stanislawa Walasiewicz Poland	25.0; NT	Catherine Johnson	NT	Josephine Gilmore	NT
80 meters hurdles	Evelyn Lawler	11.9	Nancy Phillips	NT	Constance Darnowski	NT

=== Women field events ===
Event	Gold		Silver		Bronze	
High jump	Dorothy Chisholm	1.44 m (4 ft 8 1/2 in)	Nancy Phillips	1.34 m (4 ft 4 3/4 in)	Loretta Blaul	1.34 m (4 ft 4 3/4 in)
Long jump	Mabel Landry	5.33 m (17 ft 5 3/4 in)	Nancy Phillips	5.20 m (17 ft 1/2 in)	Loretta Blaul	5.05 m (16 ft 6 3/4 in)
Shot put	Frances Kaszubski Poland; Amelia Bert	11.98 m (39 ft 3 in); 11.68 m (38 ft 3 in)	Doris Sutter	11.17 m (36 ft 7 in)	Carolyn Nave	10.09 m (33 ft 1 in)
Discus Throw	Frances Kaszubski Poland; Amelia Bert	34.56 m (113 ft 4 1/2 in); 31.39 m (102 ft 11 3/4 in)	Pauline Ruppeldt	30.34 m (99 ft 6 1/4 in)	Eva Pikal	30.03 m (98 ft 6 1/4 in)
Javelin throw	Amelia Bert	35.09 m (115 ft 1 in)	Carolyn Nave	33.25 m (109 ft 1 in)	Stanislawa Walasiewicz Poland; Margarene Harrell	33.15 m (108 ft 9 in); 29.61 m (97 ft 1 in)
Baseball throw	Juanita Watson	239 ft 2 1/4 in (72.9 m)				
Pentathlon	Stanislawa Walasiewicz Poland; Dolores Dwyer	1929; 1824	Nancy Phillips	1418	Janet Moreau	1373

== See also ==
- United States Olympic Trials (track and field)
