= Athletics at the 1951 Pan American Games – Women's 200 metres =

Women's 200 metres at the Pan American Games

The women's 200 metres event at the 1951 Pan American Games was held at the Estadio Monumental in Buenos Aires on 4 and 5 March.

== Medalists ==
Gold	Silver	Bronze
Jean Patton; United States	Nell Jackson; United States	Adriana Millard; Chile

== Results ==
=== Heats ===
Held on 4 March

Rank	Heat	Name	Nationality	Time	Notes
1	1	Jean Patton	United States	26.2	Q
2	1	Teresa Carvajal	Argentina	27.2	Q
3	1	Alejandrina Correa	Colombia	28.0	Q
	1	Graviola Ewing	Guatemala	DQ	
	1	Carmen Matos	Ecuador	DNS	
1	2	Dolores Dwyer	United States	27.3	Q
2	2	Deyse de Castro	Brazil	28.0	Q
3	2	Adriana Millard	Chile	28.0	Q
	2	Leonor Estévez	Ecuador	DNS	
1	3	Beatriz Kretschmer	Chile	27.1	Q
2	3	Cora Pascasio	Argentina	27.4	Q
	3	Helena de Menezes	Brazil	DNS	
	3	Julia Sánchez	Peru	DNS	
1	4	Nell Jackson	United States	26.5	Q
2	4	Oldemia Bargiela	Argentina	27.3	Q
3	4	Cecilia Navarrete	Colombia	27.5	Q
	4	Aida Mawyn	Ecuador	DNS	

=== Semifinals ===
Held on 4 March

Rank	Heat	Name	Nationality	Time	Notes
1	1	Jean Patton	United States	25.7	Q
2	1	Adriana Millard	Chile	26.4	Q
3	1	Dolores Dwyer	United States	26.6	Q
4	1	Teresa Carvajal	Argentina	26.7	
5	1	Alejandrina Correa	Colombia	27.8	
	1	Deyse de Castro	Brazil	DNF	
1	2	Nell Jackson	United States	26.3	Q
2	2	Beatriz Kretschmer	Chile	26.7	Q
3	2	Cecilia Navarrete	Colombia	27.0	Q
4	2	Oldemia Bargiela	Argentina	27.1	
5	2	Cora Pascasio	Argentina	27.8	

=== Final ===
Held on 5 March

Rank	Name	Nationality	Time	Notes
1st place, gold medalist(s)	Jean Patton	United States	25.3	
2nd place, silver medalist(s)	Nell Jackson	United States	25.7	
3rd place, bronze medalist(s)	Adriana Millard	Chile	26.1	
4	Beatriz Kretschmer	Chile	26.7	
5	Cecilia Navarrete	Colombia	26.9	
6	Dolores Dwyer	United States	27.7	
