= Athletics at the 1951 Pan American Games – Women's 4 × 100 metres relay =

Women's 4 × 100 metres relay at the Pan American Games

The women's 4 × 100 metres relay event at the 1951 Pan American Games was held at the Estadio Monumental in Buenos Aires on 3 March.

== Results ==
Rank	Nation	Athletes	Time	Notes
1st place, gold medalist(s)	United States	Nell Jackson, Jean Patton, Dolores Dwyer, Janet Moreau	48.7	
2nd place, silver medalist(s)	Chile	Adriana Millard, Hildegard Kreft, Betty Kretschmer, Eliana Gaete	49.3	
3rd place, bronze medalist(s)	Argentina	Olga Bianchi, Teresa Carvajal, Lilián Heinz, Ana María Fontán	49.8	
4	Brazil	Helena de Menezes, Deyse de Castro, Wanda dos Santos, Elizabeth Müller	50.5	
5	Ecuador	Carmen Matos, Leonor Estévez, Aida Mawyn, Jacinta Sandiford	53.3	
