= Athletics at the 1951 Pan American Games – Women's 100 metres =

Women's 100 metres at the Pan American Games

The women's 100 metres event at the 1951 Pan American Games was held at the Estadio Monumental in Buenos Aires on 28 February and 1 March.

== Medalists ==
Gold	Silver	Bronze
Julia Sánchez; Peru	Jean Patton; United States	Lilian Heinz; Argentina

== Results ==
=== Heats ===
Held on 28 February

Rank	Heat	Name	Nationality	Time	Notes
1	1	Adriana Millard	Chile	12.7	Q
2	1	Dolores Dwyer	United States	12.8	Q
3	1	Olga Bianchi	Argentina	13.0	Q
4	1	Graviola Ewing	Guatemala	13.5	
5	1	Carmen Matos	Ecuador	??.?	
1	2	Julia Sánchez	Peru	12.6	Q
2	2	Beatriz Kretschmer	Chile	12.8	Q
3	2	Deyse de Castro	Brazil	13.1	Q
4	2	Esther Villalón	Mexico	13.5	
5	2	Leonor Estévez	Ecuador	??.?	
1	3	Jean Patton	United States	12.6	Q
2	3	Lilian Heinz	Argentina	12.9	Q
3	3	Elizabeth Müller	Brazil	13.3	Q
4	3	Alejandrina Correa	Colombia	13.4	
5	3	Aida Mawyn	Ecuador	??.?	
1	4	Janet Moreau	United States	12.8	Q
2	4	Helena de Menezes	Brazil	13.0	Q
3	4	Ana María Fontán	Argentina	13.1	Q
4	4	Cecilia Navarrete	Colombia	13.3	
5	4	Eliana Gaete	Chile	??.?	

=== Semifinals ===
Held on 1 March

Rank	Heat	Name	Nationality	Time	Notes
1	1	Julia Sánchez	Peru	12.5	Q
2	1	Adriana Millard	Chile	12.8	Q
3	1	Olga Bianchi	Argentina	12.9	Q
4	1	Dolores Dwyer	United States	12.9	
5	1	Beatriz Kretschmer	Chile	13.0	
6	1	Deyse de Castro	Brazil	13.1	
1	2	Jean Patton	United States	12.6	Q
2	2	Lilian Heinz	Argentina	12.9	Q
3	2	Janet Moreau	United States	13.2	Q
4	2	Elizabeth Müller	Brazil	13.2	
5	2	Helena de Menezes	Brazil	13.2	
6	2	Ana María Fontán	Argentina	13.2	

=== Final ===
Held on 1 March

Rank	Name	Nationality	Time	Notes
1st place, gold medalist(s)	Julia Sánchez	Peru	12.2	
2nd place, silver medalist(s)	Jean Patton	United States	12.3	
3rd place, bronze medalist(s)	Lilian Heinz	Argentina	12.7	
4	Janet Moreau	United States	12.7	
5	Adriana Millard	Chile	12.8	
6	Olga Bianchi	Argentina	12.9	
