= Athletics at the 1951 Pan American Games – Women's shot put =

Women's shot put at the Pan American Games

The women's shot put event at the 1951 Pan American Games was held at the Estadio Monumental in Buenos Aires on 6 March.

== Results ==
Rank	Name	Nationality	Result	Notes
1st place, gold medalist(s)	Ingeborg Mello	Argentina	12.45	
2nd place, silver medalist(s)	Vera Trezoitko	Brazil	11.59	
3rd place, bronze medalist(s)	Ingeborg Pfüller	Argentina	11.58	
4	Frances Kaszubski	United States	11.34	
5	Amelia Bert	United States	10.83	
6	Julia Huapaya	Peru	10.39	
7	Ursula Holle	Chile	10.08	
8	Haydée Valet	Argentina	10.06	
9	Elizabeth Müller	Brazil	9.94	
10	Leni de Freese	Chile	9.91	
11	Daysi Hoffman	Chile	9.51	
12	Judith Caballero	Panama	8.40	
