= 1952 USA Indoor Track and Field Championships =

National athletics championship event

- Dates: February 16 (men); March 15 (women)
- Host city: New York City, New York, United States (men); Buffalo, New York, United States (women)
- Venue: Madison Square Garden (men); Connecticut Street Armory (women)
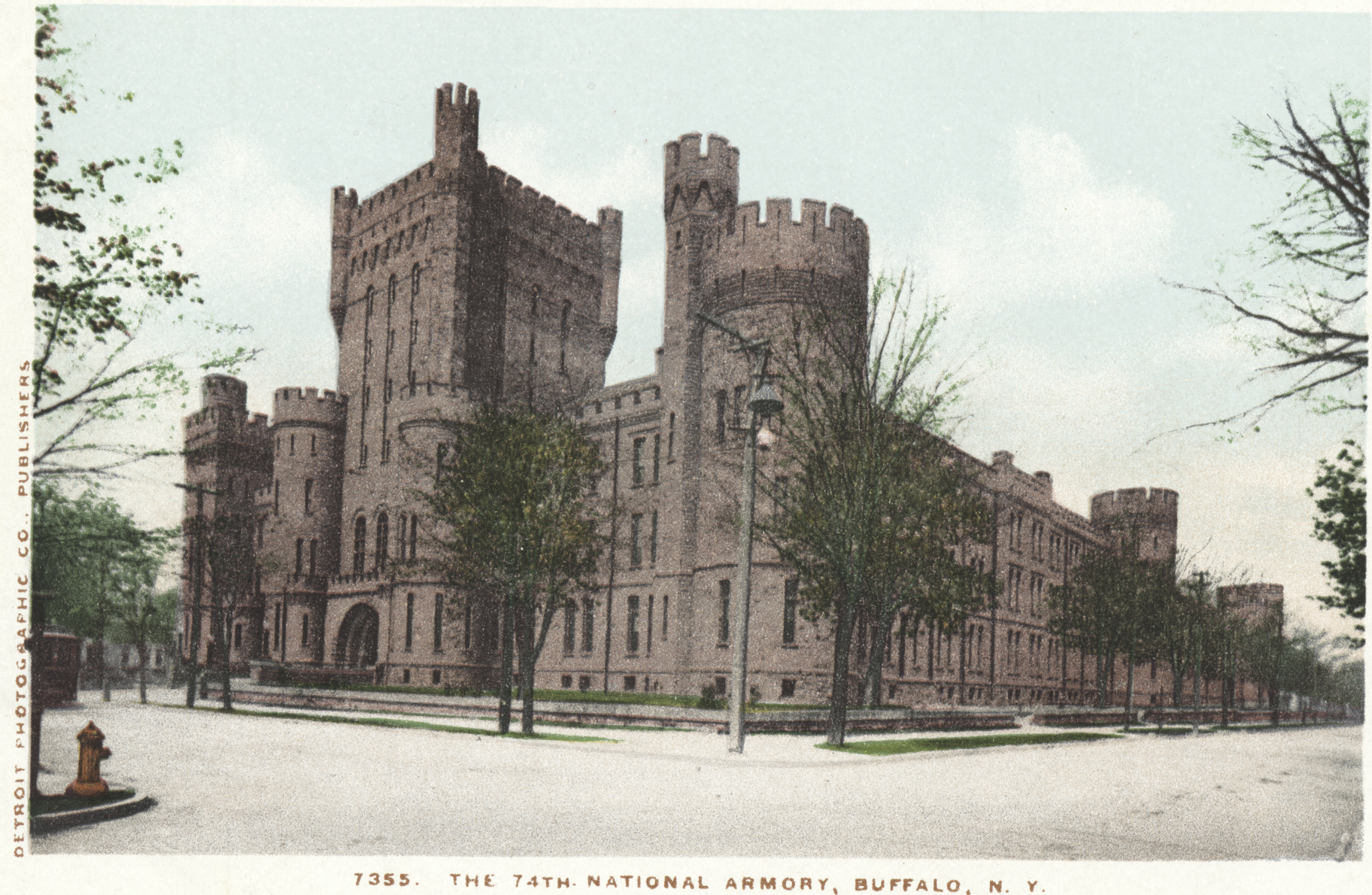
- Level: Senior
- Type: Indoor
- Events: 20 (12 men's + 8 women's)

The 1952 USA Indoor Track and Field Championships were organized by the Amateur Athletic Union (AAU) and served as the national championships in indoor track and field for the United States.

The men's edition was held at Madison Square Garden in New York City, New York, and it took place February 16. The women's meet was held separately at the Connecticut Street Armory in Buffalo, New York, taking place March 15.

At the championships, Don Gehrmann set a new 1000 yards indoor world record, breaking John Borican's mark. Dolores Dwyer posted a 6.2 50 yards record in the preliminaries and semi-finals.

== Medal summary ==
=== Men ===
| Event | Gold | | Silver | Bronze |
|---|---|---|---|---|
| 60 yards | John O'Connell | 6.3 | | |
| 600 yards | Charles Moore | 1:10.9 | | |
| 1000 yards | Don Gehrmann | 2:08.2 | | |
| Mile run | Bill Mack | 4:11.4 | | |
| 3 miles | Horace Ashenfelter | 14:02.0 | | |
| 60 yards hurdles | Harrison Dillard | 7.4 | | |
| High jump | Lewis Hall | 1.98 m | | |
| Pole vault | Bob Richards | 4.57 m | | |
| Long jump | Lorenzo Wright | 7.24 m | | |
| Shot put | Jim Fuchs | 17.14 m | | |
| Weight throw | Gil Borjeson | 17.94 m | | |
| 1 mile walk | Henry Laskau | 6:28.0 | | |

=== Women ===
| Event | Gold | | Silver | Bronze |
|---|---|---|---|---|
| 50 yards | Dolores Dwyer | 6.2 | | |
| 100 yards | Mae Faggs | 11.1 | | |
| 220 yards | Mae Faggs | 26.2 | | |
| 50 yards hurdles | Nancy Cowperthwaite-Phillips | 7.5 | | |
| High jump | Marion Boos | 1.54 m | | |
| Standing long jump | Janet Moreau | 2.69 m | | |
| Shot put | Amelia Bert | 12.48 m | | |
| Basketball throw | Elizabeth Cipolt | 90 ft 6 in (27.58 m) | | |
