= Athletics at the 1951 Pan American Games – Women's high jump =

Women's high jump at the Pan American Games

The women's high jump event at the 1951 Pan American Games was held at the Estadio Monumental in Buenos Aires on 3 March.

== Results ==
Rank	Name	Nationality	Result	Notes
1st place, gold medalist(s)	Jacinta Sandiford	Ecuador	1.45	
2nd place, silver medalist(s)	Lucy López	Chile	1.45	
3rd place, bronze medalist(s)	Elizabeth Müller	Brazil	1.45	
4	Julia Alfisi	Argentina	1.45	
5	Gladys Erbetta	Argentina	1.45	
6	Evelyn Lawler	United States	1.45	
7	Luisa García	Argentina	1.40	
8	Nancy Phillips	United States	1.35	
9	María Luisa Cuculiza	Peru	1.30	
	Leni de Freese	Chile	DNS	
