= Lilian Heinz =

Argentine sprinter (born 1935)

Lilián Heinz
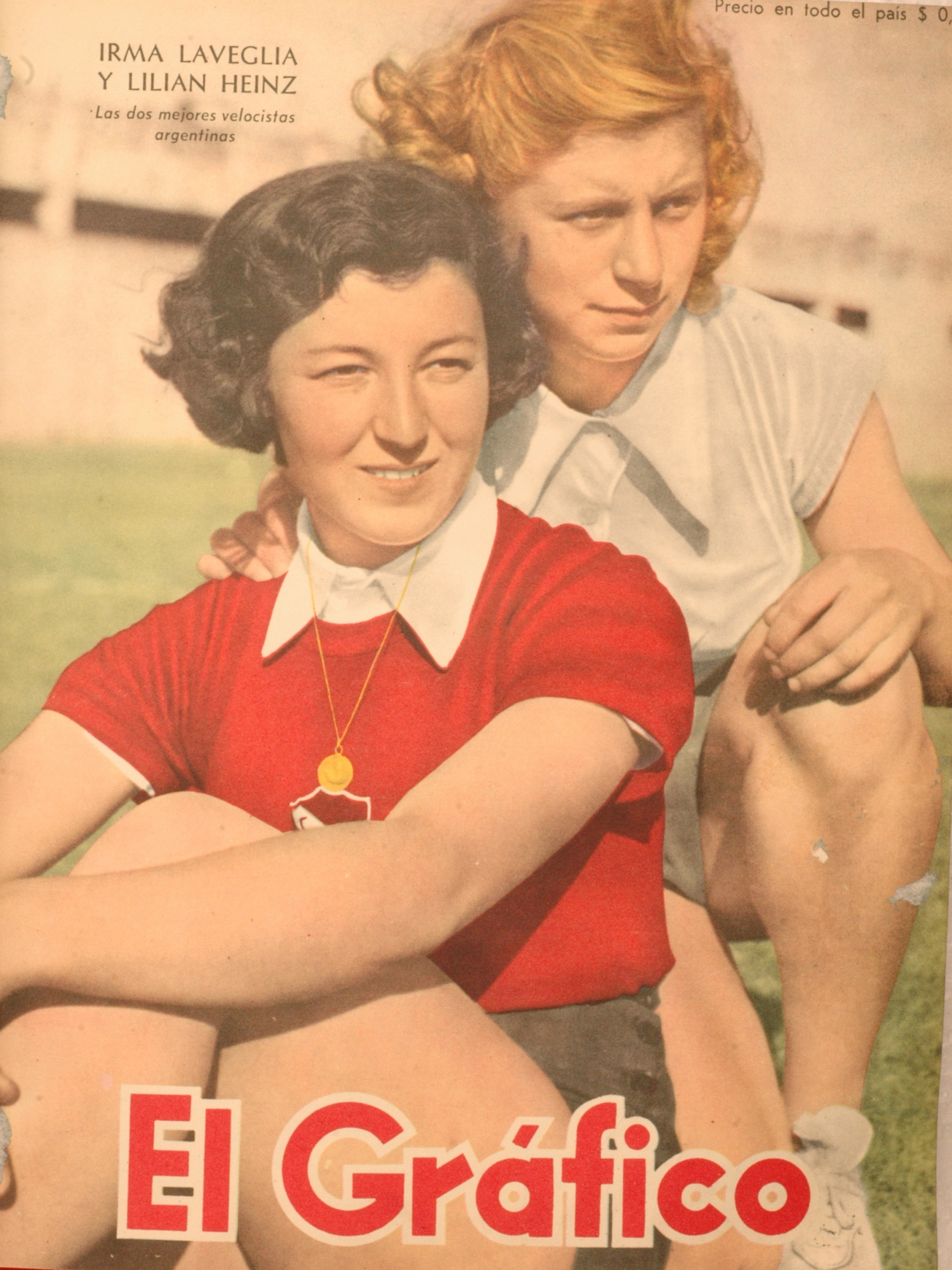

Personal information
- Born: 26 June 1935 (age 91)

Sport
- Country: Argentina
- Sport: Track and field
- Event: Sprint,

Achievements and titles
- Personal bests: 100 m – 12.38 (1955); 200 m – 25.7 (1952)
Medal record
Representing Argentina
Pan American Games
Bronze medal – third place	1951 Buenos Aires	100 m
Bronze medal – third place	1951 Buenos Aires	4 x 100 m relay
Silver medal – second place	1955 Mexico City	4 x 100 m relay

Lilián Heinz (born 26 June 1935) is an Argentine sprinter who competed in the 1952 Summer Olympics and won medals in two Pan American Games.

Heinz competed in the 1951 Pan American Games at the age of 15, winning the bronze medal in the 100 metres and the 4 x 100 metres relay. A year later Heinz competed in the 1952 Summer Olympics in Helsinki, Finland. She ran in the 100 metres and finished third in her first round heat, eliminating her from the competition. Just days later she took part in the 200 metres, again being eliminated at the heat stage after finishing fourth. Her final event in the Olympics was the 4 x 100 metres relay with teammates Lilian Buglia, Gladys Erbetta and Ana María Fontán. The team finished in third place behind Australia and the Netherlands and so did not progress to the final.

Heinz later competed in the 1955 Pan American Games in Mexico City, where she was part of the team that won the silver medal in the 4 x 100 metres relay.

== International competitions ==
Year	Competition	Venue	Position	Event	Notes
Representing Argentina
1951	Pan American Games	Buenos Aires, Argentina	3rd	100 m	12.7
1951	Pan American Games	Buenos Aires, Argentina	3rd	4 × 100 m relay	49.8
1952	South American Championships	Buenos Aires, Argentina	5th	100 m	12.4
1952	South American Championships	Buenos Aires, Argentina	3rd	200 m	25.8
1952	South American Championships	Buenos Aires, Argentina	1st	4 × 100 m relay	48.8
1952	Olympic Games	Helsinki, Finland	43rd (h)	100 m	13.01
1952	Olympic Games	Helsinki, Finland	29th (h)	200 m	26.00
1952	Olympic Games	Helsinki, Finland	11th (h)	4 × 100 m relay	48.11
1953	South American Championships (unofficial)	Santiago, Chile	3rd	100 m	12.8
1953	South American Championships (unofficial)	Santiago, Chile	2nd	200 m	25.6
1953	South American Championships (unofficial)	Santiago, Chile	2nd	4 × 100 m relay	48.7
1955	Pan American Games	Mexico City, Mexico	8th (h)	60 m	7.87
1955	Pan American Games	Mexico City, Mexico	5th	100 m	12.51
1955	Pan American Games	Mexico City, Mexico	2nd	4 × 100 m relay	47.27
