= Athletics at the 1951 Pan American Games – Women's long jump =

Women's long jump at the Pan American Games

The women's long jump event at the 1951 Pan American Games was held at the Estadio Monumental in Buenos Aires on 6 March.

== Results ==
Rank	Name	Nationality	Result	Notes
1st place, gold medalist(s)	Betty Kretschmer	Chile	5.42	
2nd place, silver medalist(s)	Lisa Peters	Chile	5.20	
3rd place, bronze medalist(s)	Wanda dos Santos	Brazil	5.18	
4	Olga Bianchi	Argentina	5.12	
5	Lilián Buglia	Argentina	5.08	
6	Nancy Phillips	United States	5.03	
7	Elena Hoss	Argentina	4.99	
8	Evelyn Lawler	United States	4.93	
	Carmen Matos	Ecuador	NM	
	Jean Patton	United States	DNS	
	Julia Sánchez	Peru	DNS	
