= Athletics at the 1955 Pan American Games – Women's high jump =

Women's high jump at the Pan American Games

The women's high jump event at the 1955 Pan American Games was held at the Estadio Universitario in Mexico City on 17 March.

== Results ==
Rank	Name	Nationality	Result	Notes
1st place, gold medalist(s)	Mildred McDaniel	United States	1.68	
2nd place, silver medalist(s)	Deyse de Castro	Brazil	1.59	
3rd place, bronze medalist(s)	Verenda Thomas	United States	1.59	
4	Janette Cantrell	United States	1.59	
5	Alice Whitty	Canada	1.56	
6	Delia Díaz	Uruguay	1.56	
7	Elizabeth Müller	Brazil	1.45	
8	Margarita Kabsch	Mexico	1.35	
	Gladys Erbetta	Argentina	DNS	
