= Deyse de Castro =

Brazilian sprinter (1933–2024)

Personal information
- Full name: Deyse Jurdelina de Castro
- Born: 18 September 1933 São Paulo, Brazil
- Died: February 2024 (aged 90)

Sport
- Sport: Athletics
- Events: 200 metres, high jump

Deyse Jurdelina de Castro (married Freire; 18 September 1933 – February 2024) was a Brazilian sprinter. She competed in the women's 200 metres at the 1952 Summer Olympics. De Castro died in February 2024, at the age of 90.

== International competitions ==
Year	Competition	Venue	Position	Event	Notes
Representing Brazil
1949	South American Championships	Lima, Peru	9th (h)	200 m	27.6
1951	Pan American Games	Buenos Aires, Argentina	8th (sf)	100 m	13.1 s
1951	Pan American Games	Buenos Aires, Argentina	9th (h)	200 m	28.0 s^{1}
1951	Pan American Games	Buenos Aires, Argentina	4th	4 × 100 m relay	50.5 s
1952	South American Championships	Buenos Aires, Argentina	6th (h)	100 m	12.6
1952	South American Championships	Buenos Aires, Argentina	1st	200 m	25.5 s
1952	South American Championships	Buenos Aires, Argentina	2nd	4 × 100 m relay	48.8 s
1952	South American Championships	Buenos Aires, Argentina	2nd	High jump	1.53 m
1952	Olympic Games	Helsinki, Finland	10th (h)	200 m	25.22 s
1952	Olympic Games	Helsinki, Finland	12th	High jump	1.50 m
1953	South American Championships (unofficial)	Santiago, Chile	2nd	100 m	12.7 s
1953	South American Championships (unofficial)	Santiago, Chile	1st	200 m	25.2 s
1953	South American Championships (unofficial)	Santiago, Chile	1st	4 × 100 m relay	48.2 s
1953	South American Championships (unofficial)	Santiago, Chile	1st	High jump	1.55 m
1954	South American Championships	São Paulo, Brazil	2nd	100 m	12.3 s (w)
1954	South American Championships	São Paulo, Brazil	1st	200 m	25.7 s
1954	South American Championships	São Paulo, Brazil	2nd	4 × 100 m relay	48.5 s
1954	South American Championships	São Paulo, Brazil	3rd	High jump	1.55 m
1954	South American Championships	São Paulo, Brazil	2nd	Long jump	5.47 m
1955	Pan American Games	Mexico City, Mexico	6th	60 m	7.8 s
1955	Pan American Games	Mexico City, Mexico	9th (h)	100 m	12.41 s
1955	Pan American Games	Mexico City, Mexico	2nd	High jump	1.59 m
1958	South American Championships	Montevideo, Uruguay	2nd	High jump	1.50 m

^{1}Did not finish in the semifinals

== Personal bests ==
- 200 metres – 25.22 (1952)
- High jump – 1.64 m (1953)
