= Gil Borjeson =

American hammer thrower

Gilbert J. Borjeson (September 15, 1929 - July 10, 2017) was an American hammer thrower.

He finished fifth at the 1951 Pan American Games in Mexico City.

In 1952, he became an NCAA champion starting for Brown University. He set his personal best of 54.25 m in College Park on 24 June 1950 while finishing second at the 1950 USA Outdoor Track and Field Championships. In 1950 and 1952, he became U.S. indoor champion in weight throwing.
