= Athletics at the 1955 Pan American Games – Women's 100 metres =

Women's 100 metres at the Pan American Games

The women's 100 metres event at the 1955 Pan American Games was held at the Estadio Universitario in Mexico City on 15 and 16 March.

== Medalists ==
Gold	Silver	Bronze
Barbara Jones; United States	Mae Faggs; United States	María Luisa Castelli; Argentina

== Results ==
=== Heats ===
Rank	Heat	Name	Nationality	Time	Notes
1	1	Mae Faggs	United States	12.09	Q, GR
2	1	Lilián Buglia	Argentina	12.38	Q
3	1	Beatriz Kretschmer	Chile	12.39	
4	1	Sara Pantoja	Mexico	13.29	
5	1	Gladys Peña	Dominican Republic	13.31	
1	2	Barbara Jones	United States	11.93	Q, GR
2	2	Lilian Heinz	Argentina	12.38	Q
3	2	Cynthia Mills	Jamaica	12.69	
4	2	Bertha Aguilar	Mexico	12.83	
5	2	Leonilda Miranda	Dominican Republic	13.81	
1	3	María Luisa Castelli	Argentina	12.26	Q
2	3	Alfrances Lyman	United States	12.31	Q
3	3	Elda Selamé	Chile	12.38	
4	3	Deyse de Castro	Brazil	12.41	
5	3	Alma Rodríguez	Mexico	13.03	

=== Final ===
Rank	Name	Nationality	Time	Notes
1st place, gold medalist(s)	Barbara Jones	United States	11.90	GR
2nd place, silver medalist(s)	Mae Faggs	United States	12.07	
3rd place, bronze medalist(s)	María Luisa Castelli	Argentina	12.38	
4	Alfrances Lyman	United States	12.42	
5	Lilian Heinz	Argentina	12.51	
	Lilián Buglia	Argentina	DNS	
