= Helena de Menezes =

Brazilian sprinter (1927–2020)

Personal information
- Nationality: Brazilian
- Born: 22 January 1927
- Died: 13 December 2020 (aged 93)

Sport
- Sport: Sprinting
- Event: 100 metres

Helena Cardoso de Menezes (22 January 1927 – 13 December 2020) was a Brazilian sprinter. She competed in the women's 100 metres at the 1948 Summer Olympics.

== International competitions ==
Year	Competition	Venue	Position	Event	Notes
Representing Brazil
1947	South American Championships	Rio de Janeiro, Brazil	5th (h)	200 m	NT
1947	South American Championships	Rio de Janeiro, Brazil	2nd	4 × 100 m relay	50.3
1948	Olympic Games	London, United Kingdom	3rd (h)	100 m	13.2
1948	Olympic Games	London, United Kingdom	4th (h)	200 m	27.7est
1951	Pan American Games	Buenos Aires, Argentina	11th (sf)	100 m	13.2
1951	Pan American Games	Buenos Aires, Argentina	4th	4 × 100 m relay	50.5
1952	South American Championships	Buenos Aires, Argentina	4th	100 m	2.4
1952	South American Championships	Buenos Aires, Argentina	6th	200 m	26.7
1952	South American Championships	Buenos Aires, Argentina	2nd	4 × 100 m relay	48.8
1952	South American Championships	Buenos Aires, Argentina	9th	Long jump	5.08 m
1952	Olympic Games	Helsinki, Finland	34th (h)	100 m	12.83
1952	Olympic Games	Helsinki, Finland	24th	Long jump	4.98 m
1953	South American Championships (unofficial)	Santiago, Chile	5th	100 m	12.9
1953	South American Championships (unofficial)	Santiago, Chile	1st	4 × 100 m relay	48.2
1953	South American Championships (unofficial)	Santiago, Chile	6th	Long jump	5.11 m

== Personal bests ==
- 100 metres – 12.2h (1952)
- 200 metres – 25.4h (1952)
