= Athletics at the 1955 Pan American Games – Women's 4 × 100 metres relay =

Women's 4 × 100 metres relay at the Pan American Games

The women's 4 × 100 metres relay event at the 1955 Pan American Games was held at the Estadio Universitario in Mexico City on 16 March.

== Results ==
Rank	Nation	Athletes	Time	Notes
1st place, gold medalist(s)	United States	Isabelle Daniels, Mabel Landry, Mae Faggs, Barbara Jones	47.12	GR
2nd place, silver medalist(s)	Argentina	Lilián Heinz, Lilián Buglia, Gladys Erbetta, María Luisa Castelli	47.27	
3rd place, bronze medalist(s)	Chile	Betty Kretschmer, Carmen Venegas, Eliana Gaete, Elda Selamé	49.49	
4	Mexico	Esther Villalón, Alma Rodríguez, Graciela Villalón, Sara Pantoja	51.33	
