= Hortensia García =

Mexican-American javelin thrower, softball player, & basketball player (1930-2016)

Personal information
- Born: January 20, 1930 El Paso, Texas, U.S.
- Died: February 29, 2016 (aged 86)

Sport
- Sport: Athletics, Softball, Basketball
- Event: Javelin throw

Achievements and titles
- Personal best: 39.45m (1951)
Medal record
Representing Mexico
Pan American Games
Gold medal – first place	1951 Buenos Aires	Javelin throw

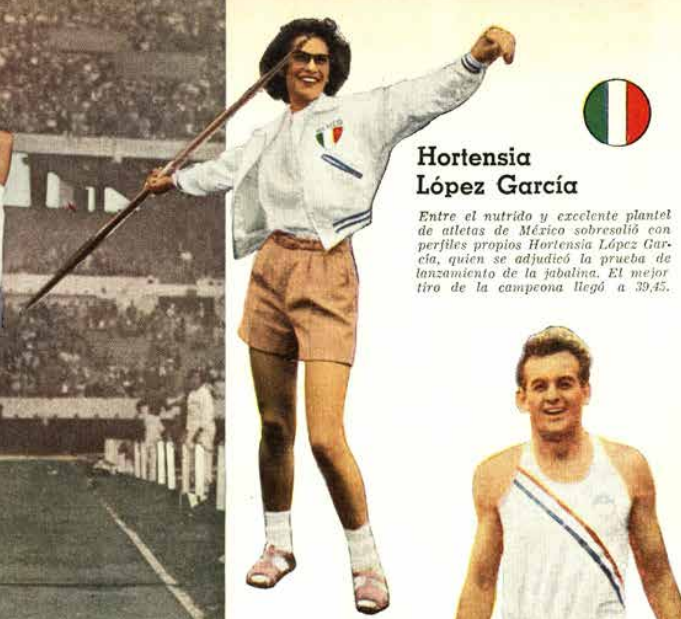
Mexican javelin thrower Hortensia López García in 1951

Hortensia "Stretch" López García (also known as Hortencia López; January 20, 1930 – February 29, 2016) was a Mexican-American javelin thrower, softball player, and basketball player. Representing Mexico, she won a gold medal in the javelin at the inaugural 1951 Pan American Games. In 1978, she became the first female player to be elected to the El Paso Softball Hall of Fame, and later served as the organization's president.

García was one of only three women sent by Mexico to compete in the 1951 Pan American Games in Buenos Aires, compared with 64 Mexican men sent that year. In the javelin throw, she finished fifth in the preliminary round and advanced to the finals, where she threw 39.45 metres to take the gold medal, 1.37 m ahead of second-place Amelia Bert of the US. However, her performance was challenged by the Panama athletics delegation, who claimed that only four athletes should have been allowed to advance to the finals. It was the first protest in Pan American Games history.

García was initially disqualified, moving Panamanian athlete Judith Caballero up to the bronze medal position. But on the following day, it was announced that the protest was unsuccessful and overturned. Some records still do not indicate García's win, or indicate her preliminary round mark of 32.68m as her final result. Nonetheless, García was admired by other female athletes. After the Games, it was revealed that a Chilean runner stole García's glasses to keep as a souvenir.
