= Virgil Severns =

American high jumper (1929–2024)

Virgil Severns (22 March 1929 – November 2024) was a male high jumper from the United States, who competed in the 1940s and 1950s. He is best known for winning the gold medal at the inaugural Pan American Games in 1951. Severns set his personal best in the men's high jump event (2.038 metres) on 1950-04-01 at a meet in Austin, Texas.

Severns was an All-American jumper for the Kansas State Wildcats track and field team, placing runner-up in the high jump at the 1950 NCAA track and field championships.

Severns died in November 2024, at the age of 95.

== Achievements ==
Year	Tournament	Venue	Result	Height
1950	US National Championships	College Park, Maryland	1st	1.97 m
1951	Pan American Games	Buenos Aires, Argentina	1st	1.95 m
