= John Twomey (runner) =

American athlete (1923–2025)

Medal record

Men's Athletics

Pan American Games
Silver medal – second place	1951 Buenos Aires	5000 metres
Bronze medal – third place	1951 Buenos Aires	1500 metres

John E. Twomey (September 10, 1923 – April 28, 2025) was an American track and field athlete, who competed in the 1951 Pan American Games.

== Life and career ==
Twomey was born on September 10, 1923 and originated from Roseville, Illinois. He attended Roseville High School, where he managed the basketball team. Twomey ran for the Western Illinois Leathernecks track and field team for two years before transferring to the Illinois Fighting Illini track and field team, where he graduated in 1941. Twomey served in the U.S. Army Air Corps during World War II, from 1943 to 1945. He worked as a corn farmer, and was a member of the Illinois Athletic Club.

Twomey tried out for the 1948 Summer Olympics, but fell just short of being selected. In 1951 Twomey won the silver medal in the 5000 metres event and the bronze medal in the 1500 metres competition.

As of 2014, Twomey was still giving presentations about track and field athletics, at the age of 90. He died in Sarasota, Florida on April 28, 2025, at the age of 101.
