= Lilián Buglia =

Argentine sprinter (1934–2016)

Personal information
- Full name: Lilián Reyna Buglia Mendoza
- Nationality: Argentine
- Born: 22 January 1934
- Died: 10 October 2016 (aged 82)
- Height: 1.54 m (5 ft 1 in)
- Weight: 50 kg (110 lb)

Sport
- Sport: Sprinting
- Event: 100 metres

Lilián Reyna Buglia Mendoza (22 January 1934 – 10 October 2016) was an Argentine sprinter. She competed in the women's 100 metres at the 1952 Summer Olympics.

== International competitions ==
Year	Competition	Venue	Position	Event	Notes
Representing Argentina
1951	Pan American Games	Buenos Aires, Argentina	5th	Long jump	5.08 m
1952	South American Championships	Buenos Aires, Argentina	3rd	100 m	12.4
1952	South American Championships	Buenos Aires, Argentina	1st	4 × 100 m relay	48.8
1952	South American Championships	Buenos Aires, Argentina	5th	Long jump	5.22 m
1952	Olympic Games	Helsinki, Finland	23rd (h)	100 m	12.62
1952	Olympic Games	Helsinki, Finland	11th (h)	4 × 100 m relay	48.11
1952	Olympic Games	Helsinki, Finland	27th (q)	Long jump	5.25 m
1953	South American Championships (unofficial)	Santiago, Chile	1st	100 m	12.6
1953	South American Championships (unofficial)	Santiago, Chile	2nd	4 × 100 m relay	48.7
1953	South American Championships (unofficial)	Santiago, Chile	3rd	Long jump	5.45 m
1955	Pan American Games	Mexico City, Mexico	5th (h)	60 m	7.77
1955	Pan American Games	Mexico City, Mexico	5th (h)	100 m	12.38^{1}
1955	Pan American Games	Mexico City, Mexico	2nd	4 × 100 m relay	47.27
1956	South American Championships	Santiago, Chile	1st (h)	100 m	12.2^{2}
1956	South American Championships	Santiago, Chile	1st	4 × 100 m relay	48.6

^{1}Did not start in the final
^{2}Did not finish in the final

== Personal bests ==
- 100 metres – 12.38 A (Mexico City 1955)
- Long jump – 5.73 metres (Rosario 1953)
