= Betty Kretschmer =

Chilean sprinter (born 1928)

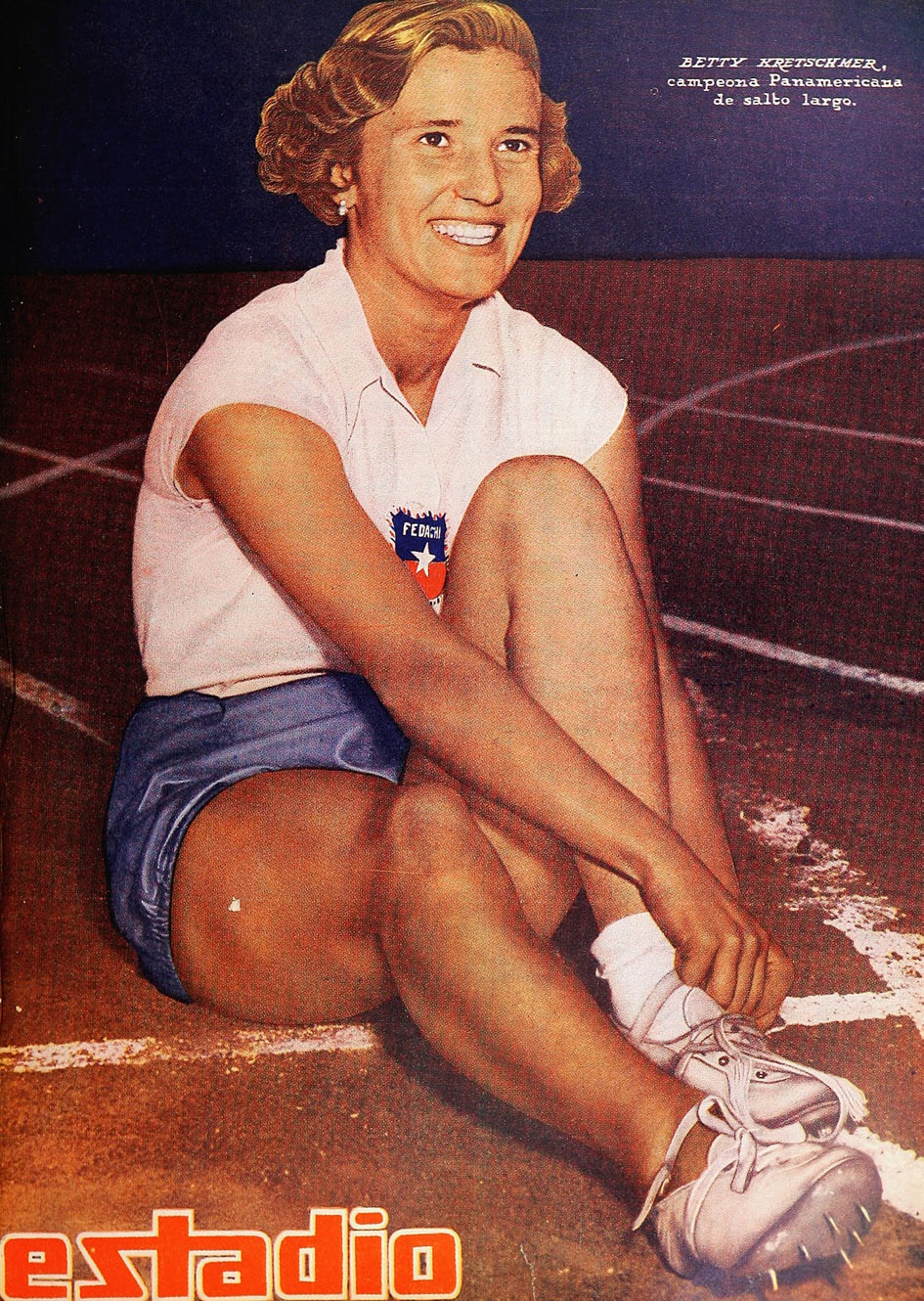

Personal information
- Full name: Beatriz Teresa Kretschmer Ries de Buccicardi
- Nationality: Chilean
- Born: 24 January 1928 (age 98)
- Height: 1.68 m (5 ft 6 in)
- Weight: 60 kg (132 lb)

Sport
- Sport: Sprinting
- Event: 100 metres

Beatriz "Betty" Teresa Kretschmer Ries de Buccicardi (born 24 January 1928) is a Chilean sprinter. She competed in the heats only at the 1948 Summer Olympics, running in the women's 100 metres, 200 metres and relay.

She was the long jump gold medallist and 4 × 100 metres relay silver medallist at the 1951 Pan American Games and returned four years later to win a further bronze medal with the Chilean relay team. She also placed fourth in the 200 m at the 1951 Games.

At regional level she had a long-lasting career. Her first medals were two silvers in the 100 m and 200 m at the 1943 South American Championships in Athletics. She gained her first South American title at the 1945 Championships, taking 100 m gold in addition to a 200 m silver. A triple followed at the 1946 South American Championships, where she topped the field in 100 m, 200 m and the long jump. Her last successes were at the 1956 South American Championships in Athletics, where she was 200 m champion and 100 m runner-up.

== International competitions ==
Year	Competition	Venue	Position	Event	Notes
Representing Chile
1943	South American Championships	Santiago, Chile	2nd	100 m	12.6
1943	South American Championships	Santiago, Chile	2nd	200 m	26.7
1943	South American Championships	Santiago, Chile	2nd	4 × 100 m relay	50.8
1945	South American Championships	Montevideo, Uruguay	1st	100 m	12.4
1945	South American Championships	Montevideo, Uruguay	3rd	200 m	27.1
1945	South American Championships	Montevideo, Uruguay	2nd	4 × 100 m relay	51.1
1946	South American Championships (unofficial)	Santiago, Chile	1st	100 m	12.3
1946	South American Championships (unofficial)	Santiago, Chile	1st	80 m hurdles	12.7
1946	South American Championships (unofficial)	Santiago, Chile	1st	Long jump	5.20 m
1948	Olympic Games	London, United Kingdom	5th (h)	100 m	NT
1948	Olympic Games	London, United Kingdom	5th (h)	200 m	NT
1948	Olympic Games	London, United Kingdom	10th (h)	4 × 100 m relay	51.68
1951	Pan American Games	Buenos Aires, Argentina	7th (sf)	100 m	13.0
1951	Pan American Games	Buenos Aires, Argentina	4th	200 m	26.7
1951	Pan American Games	Buenos Aires, Argentina	2nd	4 × 100 m relay	49.3
1951	Pan American Games	Buenos Aires, Argentina	1st	Long jump	5.42 m
1952	South American Championships	Buenos Aires, Argentina	6th	100 m	12.6
1952	South American Championships	Buenos Aires, Argentina	7th (h)	80 m hurdles	12.7
1952	South American Championships	Buenos Aires, Argentina	3rd	4 × 100 m relay	49.1
1952	South American Championships	Buenos Aires, Argentina	6th	Long jump	5.22 m
1954	South American Championships	São Paulo, Brazil	5th	100 m	12.5
1954	South American Championships	São Paulo, Brazil	4th	80 m hurdles	12.3
1954	South American Championships	São Paulo, Brazil	1st	4 × 100 m relay	48.4
1954	South American Championships	São Paulo, Brazil	6th	Long jump	5.12 m
1955	Pan American Games	Mexico City, Mexico	6th (h)	60 m	7.86
1955	Pan American Games	Mexico City, Mexico	8th (h)	100 m	12.39
1955	Pan American Games	Mexico City, Mexico	3rd	4 × 100 m relay	49.49
1956	South American Championships	Santiago, Chile	2nd	100 m	12.4
1956	South American Championships	Santiago, Chile	1st	200 m	25.5
1956	South American Championships	Santiago, Chile	4th (h)	80 m hurdles	11.9^{1}

^{1}Did not start in the final

== Personal bests ==
- 100 metres – 12.0h (1956)
- 200 metres – 25.1h (1956)
