= Lucy López =

Chilean athlete (1930–2026)

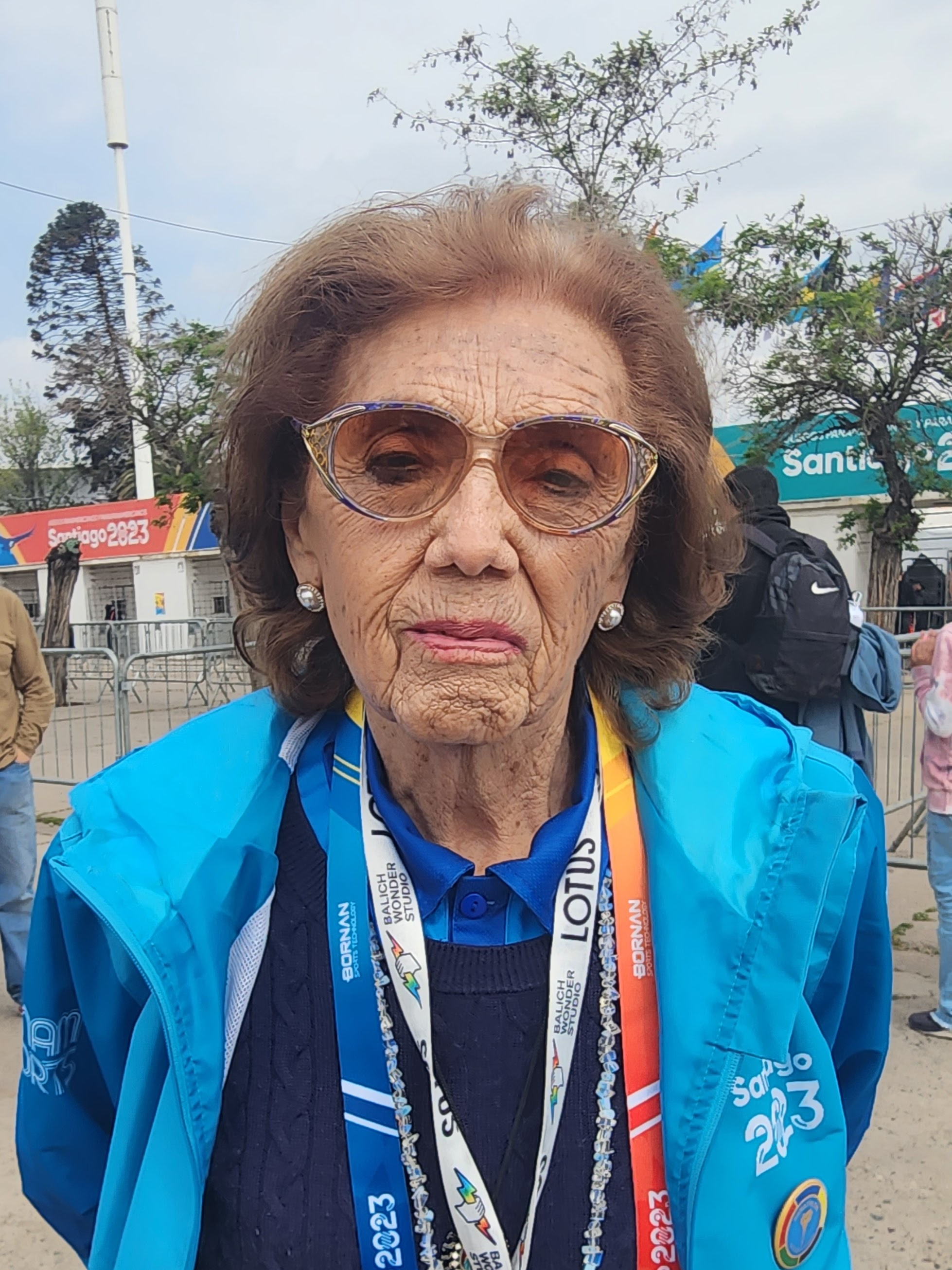
- López at the 2023 Pan American Games
- Born: Lucy López Cruz; 13 July 1930; Santiago, Chile
- Died: 27 July 2026 (aged 96); Providencia, Chile
- Education: University of Chile
- Spouse: Sergio Restovic Luksic (m. 1952)

Lucy López Cruz (13 July 1930 – 27 July 2026) was a Chilean athlete. She won silver in the women's high jump at the 1951 Pan American Games, making her the first Chilean woman medalist at the games.

Graduating in 1966 from University of Chile after studying to be a physical education teacher, López worked as a coach for various schools and organizations throughout her life, and worked as a professor in the University of Chile's athletics department for over twenty years. She continued to be active in sports administration till late in her life, working as president of the Santiago Athletic Association, on the board of directors of Santiago Marathon, and as a member of the Chile branch of Panathlon International.

In 2023, she lit the cauldron at that year's Pan American Games, with assistance from Chilean athletes Nicolás Massú and Fernando González.

== Career ==
According to López, she became interested in sports at a young age, after skiing with her family. In 1946, she learned about track and field after attending a championship event. She originally specialized in long jumping; it was not until 1949 when, at a competition in Lima, Peru, Chile's original high jumper was sick and could not compete. López took her place, finishing fourth; after that day, she began training in high jumps.

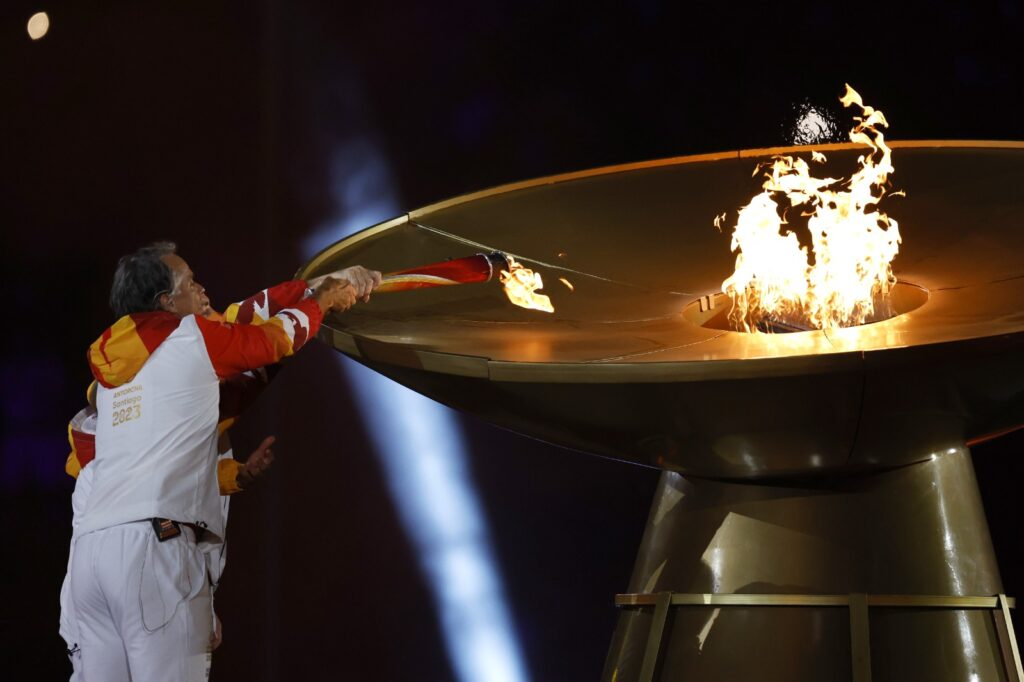
López, Fernando González, and Nicolás Massú lighting the Pan American cauldron at the opening ceremonies

In 1951, López participated in the first Pan American Games in Buenos Aires, Argentina. She took part in the high jump, jumping 1.45 metres (4.8 ft) into the air and placing second behind Ecuadorian Jacinta Sandiford. This win made López Chile's first female medalist in the competition. Though this performance qualified her to appear for Chile at the 1952 Olympics, López did not participate in the games as she had a child.

Four years later, López coached at the Colegio Universitario El Salvador. Upon her return to sports, she studied to be a physical education teacher at the University of Chile, graduating in 1966. She returned to the Colegio Universitario El Salvador to coach for another year in 1968; that same year, she began coaching at the Villa María Academy. López remained at the academy until 1990 though, from 1972 to 1973, she studied in Germany on a scholarship. After returning to Chile, in 1973, she began coaching at the Club Atlético de Santiago and teaching as a professor in the University of Chile's athletics department. López stayed with the Club Atlético de Santiago until 1985 and the university until 1994.

After one of her children was taken ill with lupus, requiring López to care for her, López took to sports administration. She became vice president and president of the Santiago Athletic Association, served on the board of directors of the Corporación Maratón de Santiago, and joined a Chile branch of Panathlon International. In 2022, an athletic event at San Carlos de Apoquindo was named for her.

At the 2023 Pan American Games, held in Santiago, López, then 93, lit the cauldron at the Estadio Nacional Julio Martínez Prádanos. Though originally meant to lift it by herself, due to her advanced age and failing strength, she was assisted by Chilean athletes Nicolás Massú and Fernando González. She also volunteered at the games. That same year, she was named one of Santiago's 100 Senior Leaders and her lifetime in sports was recognized by the Circle of Sports Journalists of Chile. (The organization had previously given her Best Former Sportswoman award in 2010.)

López left her roles at the Santiago Athletics Association and the Santiago Marathon in February 2025.

== International competitions ==
Year	Competition	Venue	Position	Event	Notes
Representing Chile
1949	South American Championships	Lima, Peru	10th (h)	80 metres hurdles	14.0 s
1949	South American Championships	Lima, Peru	?	High jump	1.3? m
1951	Pan American Games	Buenos Aires, Argentina	2nd	High jump	1.45 m

== Personal life and death ==
Lucy López Cruz was born on 13 July 1930, in Santiago, Chile, to Erasmo López Pérez, a founder of the Federación de Básquetbol de Chile who helped organize the first South American Basketball Championship. She married basketball player Sergio Restovic Luksic in 1952; the couple had four children. Her marriage ended soon after, though she and her former husband remained friends throughout their lives.

After one of her pregnancies, she had a kidney surgically removed for health reasons.

López died at her home in Providencia, Santiago, on 27 July 2026, at the age of 96. It was announced she would be buried in Santa Gema Galgani Church in Ñuñoa.
