= Ana María Fontán =

Argentine sprinter

Personal information
- Born: 13 March 1928 Buenos Aires, Argentina
- Died: 23 July 2011 age 83 Buenos Aires, Argentina

Sport
- Sport: Sprinting
- Event: 100 metres
- Club: CASLA Club San Lorenzo de Almagro

Ana María Fontán (13 March 1928 – 23 July 2011) was an Argentine sprinter. She competed in the women's 100 metres at the 1952 Summer Olympics.

== International competitions ==
Year	Competition	Venue	Position	Event	Notes
Representing Argentina
1951	Pan American Games	Buenos Aires, Argentina	12th (h)	100 m	13.2
1951	Pan American Games	Buenos Aires, Argentina	3rd	4 × 100 m relay	49.8
1952	South American Championships	Buenos Aires, Argentina	7th (h)	100 m	12.6
1952	South American Championships	Buenos Aires, Argentina	1st	4 × 100 m relay	48.8
1952	Olympic Games	Helsinki, Finland	50th (h)	100 m	13.33
1952	Olympic Games	Helsinki, Finland	11th (h)	4 × 100 m relay	48.11

== Personal bests ==
- 100 metres – 12.6h (1952)
