= Jacinta Sandiford =

Ecuadorian high jumper

Medal record

Women's athletics

Representing Ecuador

Pan American Games
Gold medal – first place	1951 Buenos Aires	High jump

Jacinta Sandiford Amador (9 April 1932 – 1 January 1987) was an Ecuadorian female track and field athlete who competed in the high jump.

Born in the Eloy Alfaro area of Durán, Ecuador, she was the daughter of an Englishman who worked as an engineer for Ecuador's state railway. She took up athletics and in her teens she won the gold medal at the inaugural Pan American Games in 1951, recording a height of 1.46 m (4 ft 9 1/4 in) and beating out Chile's Lucy López and Brazilian Elizabeth Müller on countback. This made her Ecuador's first ever medallist at the competition. She remained the only South American woman to have won that title until Solange Witteveen of Argentina did so in 1999.

Upon the Ecuadorian delegation's return, Sandiford was the first athlete off the plane which led to images of her receiving national attention. That same year she also won high jump gold at the Bolivarian Games with a mark of 1.47 m (4 ft 9 3/4 in), and is still the only Ecuadorian to have won that title. Her career came to a close shortly afterwards, however, as a result of a leg injury and acute appendicitis.
