= Gladys Erbetta =

Argentine sprinter (1928–2026)

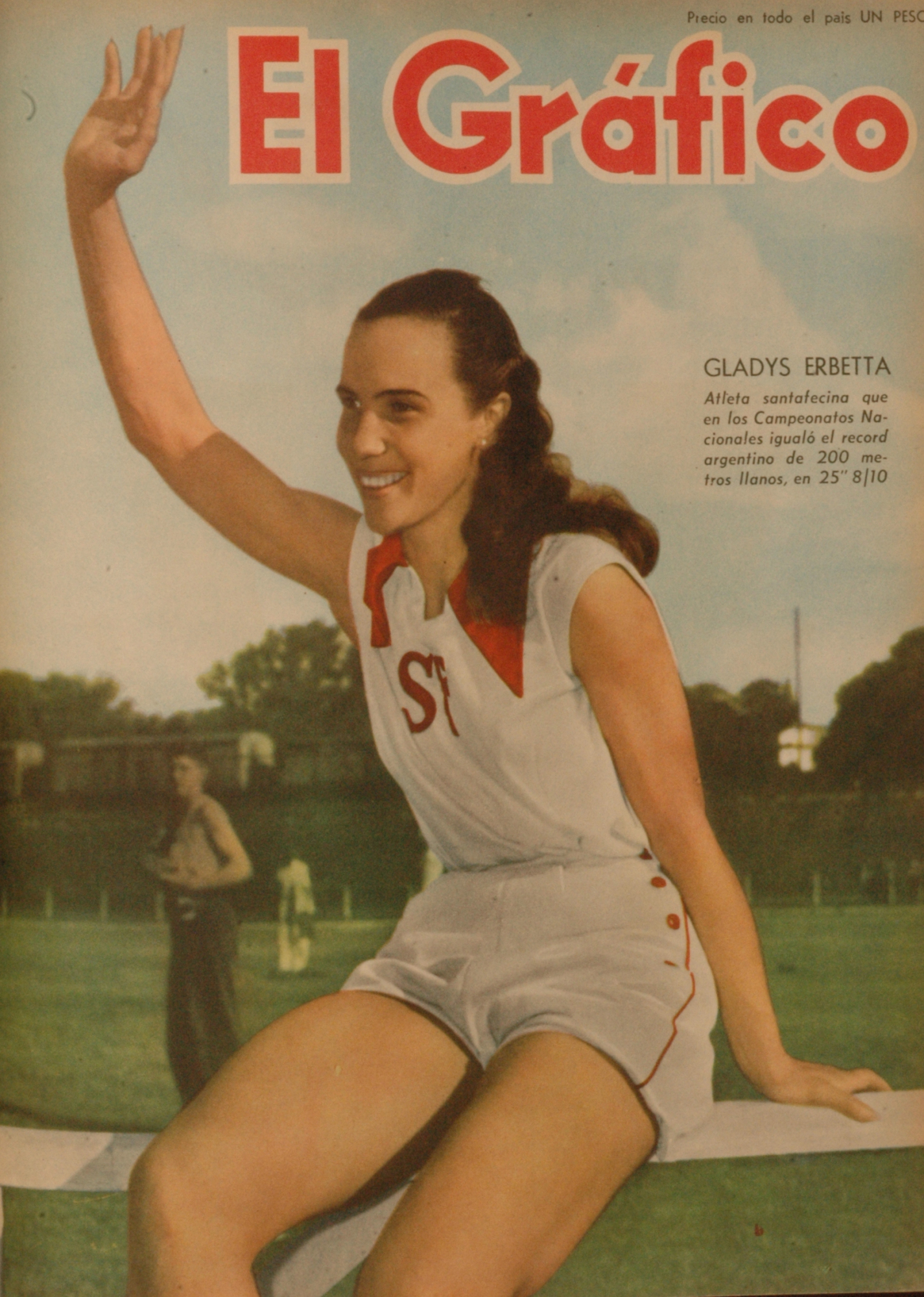
- Erbetta in 1952

Personal information
- Full name: Gladys Ivonne Erbetta Huri
- Nationality: Argentine
- Born: 28 September 1928 Santo Tomé, Santa Fe
- Died: 2 February 2026 (aged 97)
- Height: 1.57 m (5 ft 2 in)
- Weight: 53 kg (117 lb)

Sport
- Sport: Sprinting
- Event: 200 metres

Gladys Ivonne Erbetta Huri (later Mordini; 28 September 1928 – 2 February 2026) was an Argentine sprinter. She competed in the women's 200 metres at the 1952 Summer Olympics.

Erbetta died on 2 February 2026, at the age of 97.

== International competitions ==
Year	Competition	Venue	Position	Event	Notes
Representing Argentina
1951	Pan American Games	Buenos Aires, Argentina	5th	High jump	1.45 m
1952	South American Championships	Buenos Aires, Argentina	8th (h)	200 m	26.4
1952	South American Championships	Buenos Aires, Argentina	1st	4 × 100 m relay	48.8
1952	South American Championships	Buenos Aires, Argentina	1st	Long jump	5.52 m
1952	Olympic Games	Helsinki, Finland	27th (h)	200 m	25.83
1952	Olympic Games	Helsinki, Finland	11th (h)	4 × 100 m relay	48.11
1952	Olympic Games	Helsinki, Finland	18th	Long jump	5.47 m
1953	South American Championships (unofficial)	Santiago, Chile	3rd	200 m	26.0
1953	South American Championships (unofficial)	Santiago, Chile	2nd	4 × 100 m relay	48.7
1953	South American Championships (unofficial)	Santiago, Chile	–	High jump	NM
1953	South American Championships (unofficial)	Santiago, Chile	1st	Long jump	5.54 m
1955	Pan American Games	Mexico City, Mexico	4th	60 m	7.7
1955	Pan American Games	Mexico City, Mexico	2nd	4 × 100 m relay	47.27
1956	South American Championships	Santiago, Chile	1st	100 m	12.2
1956	South American Championships	Santiago, Chile	2nd	200 m	25.8
1956	South American Championships	Santiago, Chile	1st	4 × 100 m relay	48.6
1956	South American Championships	Santiago, Chile	5th	High jump	1.45 m
1956	South American Championships	Santiago, Chile	1st	Long jump	5.88 m

== Personal bests ==
- 100 metres – 12.2h (1956)
- 200 metres – 25.0h (Rosario 1953)
- Long jump – 5.88 metres (Santiago 1956)
