= Elizabeth Müller =

Brazilian athletics competitor

Elizabeth Clara Müller (married name Gonçalves; 6 March 1926 – 12 July 2010) was a Brazilian high jumper, sprinter and shot putter.

At the 1948 Summer Olympics, she placed 17th in the high jump. In the 100 metres and the shot put she was eliminated in the first round. At the 1951 Pan American Games she won a bronze medal in the high jump.

She was highly successful at the South American Championships in Athletics, winning one 200 metres title, two high jump titles and two shot put titles. In total she won 10 medals over her career at the championship, including a long jump silver medal in 1945.

She died in Abelardo Luz.

== International competitions ==
| Year | Competition | Venue | Position | Event | Notes |
Representing Brazil
| 1941 | South American Championships | Buenos Aires, Argentina | 2nd | 200 m | 26.4 |
| 1941 | South American Championships | Buenos Aires, Argentina | 3rd | 4 × 100 m relay | 52.6 |
| 1945 | South American Championships | Montevideo, Uruguay | 1st | 200 m | 26.4 |
| 1945 | South American Championships | Montevideo, Uruguay | 3rd | 4 × 100 m relay | 51.2 |
| 1945 | South American Championships | Montevideo, Uruguay | 3rd | High jump | 1.50 m |
| 1945 | South American Championships | Montevideo, Uruguay | 2nd | Long jump | 5.32 m |
| 1945 | South American Championships | Montevideo, Uruguay | 1st | Shot put | 11.79 m |
| 1946 | South American Championships (unofficial) | Santiago, Chile | 3rd | 100 m | 12.7 |
| 1946 | South American Championships (unofficial) | Santiago, Chile | 2nd | 200 m | 25.8 |
| 1946 | South American Championships (unofficial) | Santiago, Chile | 2nd | High jump | 1.50 m |
| 1946 | South American Championships (unofficial) | Santiago, Chile | 2nd | Long jump | 5.11 m |
| 1946 | South American Championships (unofficial) | Santiago, Chile | 2nd | Shot put | 11.44 m |
| 1948 | Olympic Games | London, United Kingdom | 4th (h) | 100 m | 13.2 |
| 1948 | Olympic Games | London, United Kingdom | 17th | High jump | 1.40 m |
| 1948 | Olympic Games | London, United Kingdom | 13th (q) | Shot put | 11.870 m |
| 1949 | South American Championships | Lima, Peru | 1st | 4 × 100 m relay | 49.2 |
| 1949 | South American Championships | Lima, Peru | 1st | High jump | 1.55 m |
| 1949 | South American Championships | Lima, Peru | 2nd | Shot put | 11.29 m |
| 1951 | Pan American Games | Buenos Aires, Argentina | 10th (sf) | 100 m | 13.2 |
| 1951 | Pan American Games | Buenos Aires, Argentina | 4th | 4 × 100 m relay | 50.5 |
| 1951 | Pan American Games | Buenos Aires, Argentina | 3rd | High jump | 1.45 m |
| 1951 | Pan American Games | Buenos Aires, Argentina | 9th | Shot put | 9.94 m |
| 1952 | South American Championships | Buenos Aires, Argentina | 1st | High jump | 1.53 m |
| 1952 | South American Championships | Buenos Aires, Argentina | 6th | Shot put | 10.57 m |
| 1953 | South American Championships (unofficial) | Santiago, Chile | 2nd | High jump | 1.50 m |
| 1953 | South American Championships (unofficial) | Santiago, Chile | 3rd | Shot put | 11.11 m |
| 1954 | South American Championships | São Paulo, Brazil | 2nd | 4 × 100 m relay | 48.5 |
| 1954 | South American Championships | São Paulo, Brazil | 2nd | High jump | 1.55 m |
| 1954 | South American Championships | São Paulo, Brazil | 1st | Shot put | 11.79 m |
| 1955 | Pan American Games | Mexico City, Mexico | 7th | High jump | 1.45 m |
| 1956 | South American Championships | Santiago, Chile | 2nd | High jump | 1.50 m |
| 1956 | South American Championships | Santiago, Chile | 3rd | Shot put | 11.31 m |
