= Nell Jackson =

American Olympic sprinter and track coach (1929–1988)

Nell Cecelia Jackson

Personal information
- Nationality: American
- Born: July 1, 1929 Athens, Georgia, U.S.
- Died: April 1, 1988 (aged 58) Binghamton, New York, U.S.
- Education: Tuskegee Institute; Springfield College; University of Iowa
- Occupations: Coach, administrator

Sport
- Sport: Athletics
- University team: Tuskegee Institute
Medal record
Women's athletics
Representing United States
Pan American Games
Gold medal – first place	1951 Buenos Aires	4 x 100 m
Silver medal – second place	1951 Buenos Aires	200 m

Nell Cecelia Jackson (July 1, 1929 – April 1, 1988) was an Olympic sprinter and track coach. In 1956, she was the first African-American be named head coach of the U.S. Olympic Women's Track and Field Team. She also served as the head coach in the 1972 Olympic Games. Nell was a member of Alpha Kappa Alpha sorority.

== Early life ==
Nell Jackson was born in Athens, Georgia, to Burnette L. Jackson Sr. and Wilhemina G. Jackson, and was the only daughter of three children. Her two brothers were Burnette L. Jackson Jr. and Thomas O. Jackson.

== Education ==
Jackson earned her Bachelor of Science degree in physical education from Tuskegee University in 1951, and a Master of Science degree in physical education from Springfield College in 1953. In 1955, Jackson participated in a summer study at the University of Oslo, Norway. Jackson earned a Doctor of Philosophy degree in physical education at the University of Iowa in 1962.

== Athletics ==
In 1944, at the age of 15, Jackson competed in the US national championships. In 1945, she competed in the AAU indoor and outdoor championships, placing second each time to Stella Walsh in the 200 meters.

While she attended Tuskegee Institute, she was a member of the 1948 US Olympic team. Led by Tuskegee's Hall of Fame head football coach Cleveland Abbott, Jackson won two national collegiate titles in 1950, in the 200 meters and the 400 meter relay. She competed at the 1951 Pan-American Games, placing second in the 200 meters and first as a member of the US 400 meter relay team.

Jackson set the American record for 200 meters in August 1949, running 24.2 seconds. (Note: Multiple sources note this time as an American record, though American Helen Stephens appears to have run 24.1 seconds in 1936.)

Jackson was inducted into the US National Track and Field Hall of Fame in 1989, a year after she died in Vestal, New York.

=== Championship results ===
- 1945 AAU: 200 m (2nd)
- 1945 AAU Indoors: 200 m (2nd)
- 1951 Pan-Am Games: 200 m (2nd)
- 1951 Pan-Am Games: 400 m relay (1st)
- 1950 NCAA: 200 m (1st)
- 1950 NCAA: 400 m relay (1st)

== Coaching and athletics administration ==
In 1953, Jackson returned to Tuskegee to work as the women's track and field coach, later also serving as the first men's swimming coach after creating the Tuskegee swimming program in 1958. She subsequently coached track and field at four universities: Iowa, Illinois State, Illinois, and Michigan State. She was the head coach of the 1970 national champion track team at the University of Illinois.

In 1956, Jackson was the first black head coach for a US Olympic track and field team. She served as the head coach of the women's team at the 1956 and 1972 Olympics. From 1973 to 1981, she served as the first assistant director of Athletics for Women at Michigan State University (MSU), and also served as MSU's women's track and field head coach for six seasons. She coached 13 athletes to All-America honors at MSU.

After leaving Michigan State in 1981, Jackson director of physical education and intercollegiate athletics at the State University of New York (SUNY).

== Nell C. Jackson Award ==
National Girls and Women In Sports (NAGWS) established the Nell C. Jackson Memorial Award. This award is presented annually to minority women who have demonstrated outstanding leadership in sports.
