= Frances Kaszubski =

American athlete

Medal record

Women's athletics

Representing United States

Pan American Games
| Bronze medal – third place | 1951 Buenos Aires | Discus throw |

Frances Theresa Kaszubski (née Gorn-Sobczak) (May 15, 1916 Donora, Pennsylvania - April 11, 2010 Berea, Ohio) was an American born, Polish track and field athlete known for her participation in weight throwing, discus and shot put. During World War II she officially represented Poland, but competed primarily in the United States. A contemporary on her Polish Women's Olympic Club at the time in Cleveland, was Stanisława Walasiewicz who also represented Poland. After her marriage and after the war she chose to represent the United States, as did Walasiewicz, who changed her name to Stella Walsh.

Standing 6 feet 2 inches (1.88 m), she was a giant of her sport. In 1943 under her maiden name, 1945, 1948, and 1950, Kaszubski was the National AAU champion in the shot put. and she was the Indoor Champion in 1948 and 1951. She was also the National Champion in the discus throw in 1943, 1945 and five time straight from 1947 to 1951. In all, she placed in 19 AAU championships. Kaszubski participated in AAU with the Westlake Athletic Club. She was ranked as All-American 13 times by the AAU.

Representing the US, she won both events at the 1948 Olympic Trials, thus qualifying her to represent the US in the Olympics. In London, she finished in 11th place in the discus, in the shot put she didn't make it out of the qualifying round. In 1951, Kaszubski won bronze with discus and fourth with shot put in the Pan-American Games, beaten in both events by two Argentine women named Ingeborg, Mello and Pfüller in Buenos Aires.

Despite how well she did with track-and-field throwing events, Kaszubski considered basketball her best sport. She was named national AAU center in 1943. While playing AAU basketball, she was offered an athletic scholarship from a college in Canada. Kaszubski turned it down, she felt she needed to focus on supporting her family monetarily.

In 1955, Kaszubski was inducted into the Helms Athletic Foundation Women's Hall of Fame. Kaszubski was the manager of the women's track team in 1959 for the Pan-Am Games where USA women won gold medals in all but two events. The following year, she managed the women's track team again, this time for the Olympics held in Rome. Kaszubski held the position of National AAU chair for women's track for 7 years. In 2020, she was inducted into the National Polish-American Sports Hall of Fame.Locally, she served as city recreation administrator for 22 years. The proclamation at her 1978 retirement read:

"Mrs. Kaszubski led the renaissance of women's competitive sports in the United States,"

In Kaszubski's obituary, people expressed their experiences with her. Maralyn West stated about Kaszubski, "She did everything she could for women’s sports and the kids." "She really took care us," said Eleanor Montgomery, who was a Pan-American gold medalist and studied under Kaszubski. "She told us to work hard. She told us we could do anything." "She was a go-to person," said John Herrick, who was the president of the Greater Cleveland Sports Hall of Fame in 2010 that Kaszubski served as trustee and was inducted three times for basketball, track and field, and service. "She had a storehouse of knowledge. I would always give her a call for advice."

Kaszubski said she found a friendship with other athletes with whom she competed. "If the athletes of the world could influence the diplomats and politicians, there would be a far greater chance of lasting peace."
