= Jean Patton =

American sprinter

Medal record

Women's athletics

Representing the United States

Pan American Games
Gold medal – first place	1951 Buenos Aires	100 m
Silver medal – second place	1951 Buenos Aires	200 m
Gold medal – first place	1951 Buenos Aires	4 × 100 m relay

Jean Patton (born 1932) is an American track and field sprinter who competed in the 100-meter dash and 200-meter dash. She was a three-time national champion, winning the women's 100 m in 1949 and 1950, before a 200 m title in 1951.

She competed at one major international tournament for the United States, the 1951 Pan American Games, where she excelled with gold medals in the 200 m and 4 × 100 metres relay (alongside Nell Jackson, Dolores Dwyer and Janet Moreau), as well as a silver medal in the 100 m behind Peru's Julia Sánchez.

An African-American, she attended Tennessee State College and competed for the institution athletically.

== National titles ==
- USA Outdoor Track and Field Championships
  - 100 m: 1949, 1950
  - 200 m: 1951

== See also ==
- List of 100 metres national champions (women)
