= Amelia Wood =

American athlete (1930–2013)

Medal record

Women's athletics

Representing the United States

Pan American Games
Gold medal – first place	1951 Buenos Aires	Javelin throw
Bronze medal – third place	1955 Mexico City	Javelin throw
Bronze medal – third place	1959 Chicago	Javelin throw

Amelia Wood (née Amelia Wershoven, Amelia Bert; December 11, 1930 – June 7, 2013) was an American track and field athlete who competed in throwing events, specializing in the javelin throw. She was a Pan American Games champion and a 1956 Olympian.

She was highly successful at national level, winning seven American titles, indoors and out, and two javelin national titles. She was also the highest ranked American in shot put and discus at the 1950 AAU Championships, finishing behind Poland's Frances Kaszubski who was present as a foreign competitor. Wood had much longevity, finishing in the top five in the national shot put competition every year from 1949 to 1954 and ranking in the top two American javelin throwers each season from 1950 to 1959.

Internationally, Wood had most of her success at the Pan American Games javelin competition. At the inaugural event in 1951 in Buenos Aires, she took the gold medal with a throw of 38.08 m (124 ft 11 in). She returned for the following two editions and reached the podium both times, taking bronze medals in 1955 and 1959. She also represented the United States in the shot put at the 1951 meet, placing fifth. She made one appearance at the Olympic Games, as part of America's three-woman javelin team at the 1956 Summer Olympics, where she was 14th in the final behind her compatriot's Karen Anderson and Marjorie Larney.

During her period, the baseball throw was still a common sight in track and field competitions and she set a world record for the event in 1957 with a mark of 76.92 m (252 ft 4 1/4 in). She was also the national champion in this event in 1951.

Born in Ridgefield Park, New Jersey, she married John E. Wood and had four children (Suzanne, Barron (Keith), Brendan, Sean and Terence). She died in Mattituck, New York.

== International competitions ==
Year	Competition	Venue	Position	Event	Notes
1951	Pan American Games	Buenos Aires, Argentina	1st	Javelin throw	38.08 m
1951	Pan American Games	Buenos Aires, Argentina	5th	Shot put	10.83 m
1955	Pan American Games	Mexico City, Mexico	3rd	Javelin throw	43.06 m
1956	Olympic Games	Melbourne, Australia	14th	Javelin throw	44.29 m
1959	Pan American Games	Chicago, United States	3rd	Javelin throw	42.96 m

== National titles ==
- USA Outdoor Track and Field Championships
  - Shot put: 1949, 1950 (best American), 1951, 1952, 1953
  - Javelin throw: 1950, 1953
  - Discus throw: 1950 (best American)
  - Baseball throw: 1951
- USA Indoor Track and Field Championships
  - Shot put: 1950, 1952, 1953
