= Dolores Dwyer =

American sprinter (1932–2011)

Personal information
- Born: December 25, 1932 New York City, United States
- Died: October 29, 2011 (aged 78) New York, United States

Sport
- Sport: Track and field
- Event: 200m

Dolores Dwyer (married name Duffy; December 25, 1932 – October 29, 2011) was an American sprinter. She competed in the Women's 200 metres event at the 1952 Summer Olympics. In her later life, she became an actress, which included recurring role as Iris Puffybush on the Comedy Central series Strangers with Candy and its subsequent film adaptation, and a role in the television show Sex and the City.

Dwyer studied at Queens College, City University of New York, but did not run for the Queens Knights team.

== Filmography ==
=== Film ===
| Year | Title | Role | Notes |
|---|---|---|---|
| 1999 | Kill by Inches | Old Lady with Glasses | |
| 2005 | Strangers with Candy | Iris Puffybush | Credited as Dolores Duffy |
| 2012 | Becoming Blond | Aunt Gertrude | Posthumous release |

=== Television ===
| Year | Title | Role | Notes |
|---|---|---|---|
| 2000 | Strangers with Candy | Iris Puffybush / Nurse / Organist | 12 episodes |
| 2001 | TV Funhouse | Old Lady on Bus | Episode: "Safari Day" |
| 2003 | Sex and the City | Mrs. McCaffrey / Cataract Lady | 2 episodes |
