= Athletics at the 1951 Pan American Games =

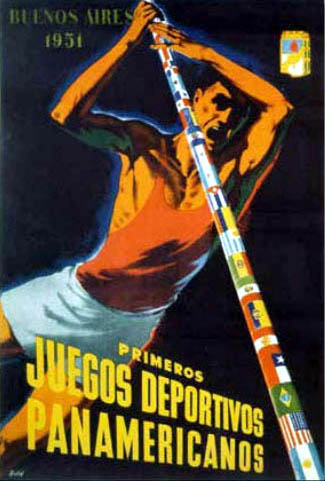
- Venue: River Plate Stadium
- Date: 27 February – 6 March
- Competitors: 243 from 15 nations

The Athletics Competition at the 1951 Pan American Games was held in the Argentine capital, Buenos Aires. A total of 15 nations participated, with 243 athletes representing them in 33 athletics events.

== Medal summary ==
=== Men's events ===
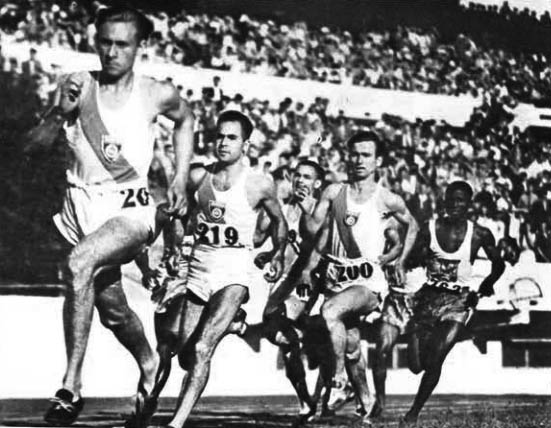
Mal Whitfield won the 400 m

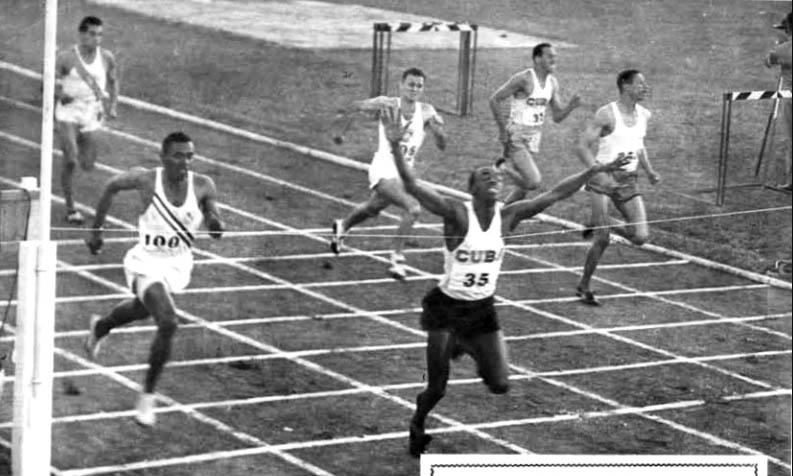
Cuban Rafael Fortún won the 200 m

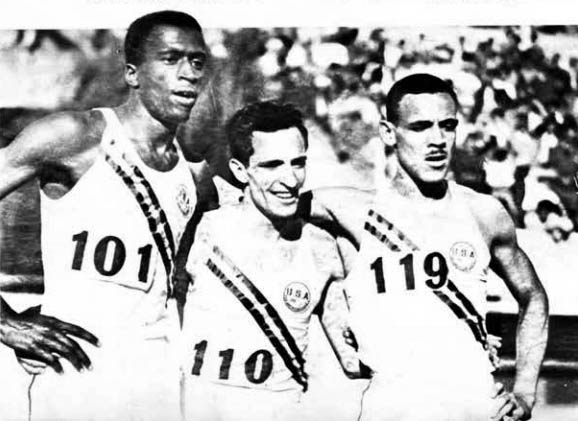
US athletes Bill Brown, Hugo Maiocco, and Mal Whitfield

Event	Gold		Silver		Bronze	
100 metres	Rafael Fortún; Cuba	10.6	Art Bragg; United States	10.6	Herb McKenley; Jamaica	11.0
200 metres	Rafael Fortún; Cuba	21.3	Art Bragg; United States	21.4	Herb McKenley; Jamaica	21.5
400 metres	Mal Whitfield; United States	47.8	Hugo Maiocco; United States	48	Herb McKenley; Jamaica	48.2
800 metres	Mal Whitfield; United States	1:53.2	Bill Brown; United States	1:53.3	Hugo Maiocco; United States	1:53.6
1500 metres	Browning Ross; United States	4:00.4	Guillermo Solá; Chile	4:00.5	John Twomey; United States	4:02.0
5000 metres	Ricardo Bralo; Argentina	14:57.2	John Twomey; United States	14:57.5	Gustavo Rojas; Chile	15:06.4
10,000 metres	Curt Stone; United States	31:08.6	Ricardo Bralo; Argentina	31:09.4	Ezequiel Bustamente; Argentina	32:31.8
Marathon	Delfo Cabrera; Argentina	2:35:01	Reinaldo Gorno; Argentina	2:45:00	Luis Velásquez; Guatemala	2:46:03
110 metres hurdles	Dick Attlesey; United States	14.0	Estanislao Kocourek; Argentina	14.2	Samuel Anderson; Cuba	14.2
400 metres hurdles	Jaime Aparicio; Colombia	53.4	Wilson Carneiro; Brazil	53.7	Don Halderman; United States	54.5
3000 metres steeplechase	Curt Stone; United States	9:32.0	Browning Ross; United States	9:32.0	Pedro Caffa; Argentina	9:44.6
4 × 100 metres relay	United States; Donald Campbell; Art Bragg; Dick Attlesey; John Voight	41.0	Cuba; Raúl Mazorra; Angel García; Jesús Farrés; Rafael Fortún	41.2	Argentina; Gerardo Bönnhoff; Adelio Márquez; Fernando Lapuente; Mariano Acosta	41.8
4 × 400 metres relay	United States; Bill Brown; Mal Whitfield; John Voight; Hugo Maiocco	3:09.9	Chile; Jaime Hitelman; Reinaldo Martín Muller; Gustavo Ehlers; Jörn Gevert	3:17.7	Argentina; Guido Veronese; Máximo Guerra; Julio Ferreyra; Eduardo Balducci	3:18.4
10,000 metres walk	Henry Laskau; United States	50:26.8	Luis Turza; Argentina	52:27.5	Martín Casas; Argentina	52:59.6
50 kilometres walk	Sixto Ibáñez; Argentina	5:06:07	James Jackson; Trinidad and Tobago	5:21:13	Amando González; Argentina	5:27:01
High jump	Virgil Severns; United States	1.95	Cal Clark; United States	1.90	Adilton de Almeida; Brazil	1.90
Pole vault	Bob Richards; United States	4.50	Jaime Piqueras; Peru	3.90	Sinibaldo Gerbasi; Brazil	3.90
Long jump	Gay Bryan; United States	7.14	Albino Geist; Argentina	7.09	Jim Holland; United States	6.95
Triple jump	Adhemar da Silva; Brazil	15.19	Hélio da Silva; Brazil	15.17	Bruno Witthaus; Argentina	14.34
Shot put	Jim Fuchs; United States	17.25	Juan Kahnert; Argentina	14.27	Nadim Marreis; Brazil	14.07
Discus throw	Jim Fuchs; United States	48.91	Dick Doyle; United States	47.28	Elvio Porta; Argentina	44.93
Hammer throw	Emilio Ortíz; Argentina	48.04	Manuel Etchepare; Argentina	46.12	Arturo Melcher; Chile	45.70
Javelin throw	Ricardo Héber; Argentina	68.08	Steve Seymour; United States	67.08	Horst Walter; Argentina	66.33
Decathlon	Hernán Figueroa; Chile	6610	Hernán Alzamora; Peru	6063	Enrique Salazar; Guatemala	4380

=== Women's events ===
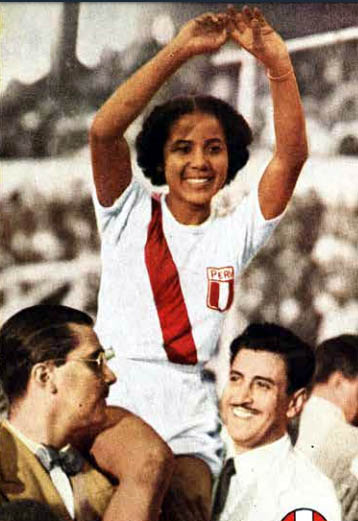
Peruvian athlete Julia Sánchez

Event	Gold		Silver		Bronze	
100 metres	Julia Sánchez; Peru	12.2	Jean Patton; United States	12.3	Lilián Heinz; Argentina	12.7
200 metres	Jean Patton; United States	25.3	Nell Jackson; United States	25.7	Adriana Millard; Chile	26.1
80 metres hurdles	Eliana Gaete; Chile	11.9	Marion Huber; Chile	12.0	Nancy Phillips; United States	12.1
4 × 100 metres relay	United States; Nell Jackson; Jean Patton; Dolores Dwyer; Janet Moreau	48.7	Chile; Adriana Millard; Hildegard Kreft; Betty Kretschmer; Eliana Gaete	49.3	Argentina; Olga Bianchi; Teresa Carvajal; Lilián Heinz; Ana María Fontán	49.8
High jump	Jacinta Sandiford; Ecuador	1.46	Lucy López; Chile	1.46	Elizabeth Müller; Brazil	1.46
Long jump	Beatriz Kretschmer; Chile	5.42	Lisa Peters; Chile	5.20	Wanda dos Santos; Brazil	5.18
Shot put	Ingeborg Mello; Argentina	12.45	Vera Trezoitko; Brazil	11.59	Ingeborg Pfüller; Argentina	11.58
Discus throw	Ingeborg Mello; Argentina	38.55	Ingeborg Pfüller; Argentina	37.19	Frances Kaszubski; United States	35.84
Javelin throw^{[nb]}	Hortensia López García; Mexico	39.45	Amelia Bert; United States	38.08	Berta Chiú; Mexico	37.97

- ^{nb} Hortensia López García finished 5th in the preliminary round and advanced to the final, winning the women's javelin throw with a distance of 39.45m. Her performance was challenged that same day by the Panama athletics delegation, which claimed that only the top 4 athletes should have advanced to the final instead of the top 6. García's finals performance was briefly discounted, moving Judith Caballero of Panama up to the bronze medal position, but it was reinstated the next day. Some sources still list García's preliminary round mark of 32.68m as her final result.

== Medal table ==
* Host nation (Argentina)

Rank	Nation	Gold	Silver	Bronze	Total
1	United States	17	11	6	34
2	Argentina*	7	8	12	27
3	Chile	3	6	3	12
4	Cuba	2	1	1	4
5	Brazil	1	3	5	9
6	Peru	1	2	0	3
7	Colombia	1	0	0	1
7	Ecuador	1	0	0	1
9	Mexico	0	1	0	1
9	Trinidad and Tobago	0	1	0	1
11	Jamaica	0	0	3	3
12	Guatemala	0	0	2	2
13	Panama	0	0	1	1
Totals (13 entries)		33	33	33	99

== Participating nations ==
- Argentina (70)
- Brazil (20)
- Chile (36)
- Colombia (12)
- Cuba (9)
- Ecuador (7)
- Guatemala (7)
- Jamaica (1)
- Mexico (13)
- Panama (2)
- Paraguay (11)
- Peru (12)
- Trinidad and Tobago (6)
- United States (31)
- Venezuela (6)
