= Mario Fayos =

Uruguayan athlete

Personal information
- Full name: Mario Guinemer Fayos Romero
- Born: 2 February 1927 Montevideo, Uruguay
- Height: 1.78 m (5 ft 10 in)
- Weight: 73 kg (161 lb)

Sport
- Sport: Sprinting
- Event: 100 metres

Mario Guinemer Fayos Romero (born 2 February 1927) was a Uruguayan sprinter. He competed in the men's 100 metres at the 1948 Summer Olympics.

== Competition record ==
Year	Competition	Venue	Position	Event	Notes
Representing Uruguay
1947	South American Championships	Rio de Janeiro, Brazil	– (h)	100 m	DQ
1947	South American Championships	Rio de Janeiro, Brazil	5th	200 m	NT
1947	South American Championships	Rio de Janeiro, Brazil	2nd	4 × 100 m relay	42.9
1948	Olympic Games	London, United Kingdom	18th (qf)	100 m	11.08
1948	Olympic Games	London, United Kingdom	4th (h)	200 m	NT
1948	Olympic Games	London, United Kingdom	10th (h)	4 × 100 m relay	42.8
1949	South American Championships	Lima, Peru	3rd	100 m	10.8
1949	South American Championships	Lima, Peru	1st	200 m	21.7
1949	South American Championships	Lima, Peru	5th	4 × 100 m relay	43.9
1952	South American Championships	Buenos Aires, Argentina	9th (sf)	100 m	11.0
1952	South American Championships	Buenos Aires, Argentina	4th	200 m	22.2
1952	South American Championships	Buenos Aires, Argentina	5th	4 × 100 m relay	42.5
1952	South American Championships	Buenos Aires, Argentina	4th	4 × 400 m relay	3:25.7
1953	South American Championships (unofficial)	Santiago, Chile	5th	100 m	11.2
1953	South American Championships (unofficial)	Santiago, Chile	6th (h)	200 m	22.4

== Personal bests ==
- 100 metres – 10.3h (1949)
- 200 metres – 21.7h (1949)
