= Walter Pérez (athlete) =

Uruguayan athlete (1924–2009)

Personal information
- Full name: Walter Pérez Soto
- Born: 1 November 1924 Montevideo, Uruguay
- Died: 30 December 2009 (aged 85) Lima, Peru
- Height: 1.73 m (5 ft 8 in)
- Weight: 64 kg (141 lb)

Sport
- Sport: Sprinting
- Event: 100 metres

Walter Pérez Soto (1 November 1924 – 30 December 2009) was a Uruguayan sprinter. He competed in the men's 100 metres at the 1948 Summer Olympics.

== Competition record ==
Year	Competition	Venue	Position	Event	Notes
Representing Uruguay
1943	South American Championships	Santiago, Chile	2nd	100 m	10.9
1943	South American Championships	Santiago, Chile	1st (h)	200 m	22.1^{1}
1945	South American Championships	Montevideo, Uruguay	2nd	100 m	10.7
1945	South American Championships	Montevideo, Uruguay	3rd (h)	200 m	22.1^{2}
1945	South American Championships	Montevideo, Uruguay	3rd	4 × 100 m relay	43.3
1947	South American Championships	Rio de Janeiro, Brazil	4th (h)	100 m	11.1
1947	South American Championships	Rio de Janeiro, Brazil	9th (h)	200 m	22.7
1947	South American Championships	Rio de Janeiro, Brazil	2nd	4 × 100 m relay	42.9
1948	Olympic Games	London, United Kingdom	33rd (h)	100 m	11.0
1948	Olympic Games	London, United Kingdom	4th (h)	200 m	NT
1948	Olympic Games	London, United Kingdom	10th (h)	4 × 100 m relay	42.8
1950	South American Championships (unofficial)	Montevideo, Uruguay	1st	100 m	10.5
1950	South American Championships (unofficial)	Montevideo, Uruguay	1st	200 m	21.9
1952	South American Championships	Buenos Aires, Argentina	12th (h)	100 m	11.1
1952	South American Championships	Buenos Aires, Argentina	5th	4 × 100 m relay	42.5
1953	South American Championships (unofficial)	Santiago, Chile	10th (h)	100 m	11.2
1953	South American Championships (unofficial)	Santiago, Chile	7th (h)	200 m	22.4
1953	South American Championships (unofficial)	Santiago, Chile	–	4 × 100 m relay	DQ

^{1}Did not finish in the final
^{2}Did not start in the final

== Personal bests ==
- 100 metres – 10.4h (1943)
- 200 metres – 21.5h (1944)
