= Annegret Weller =

Chilean sprinter

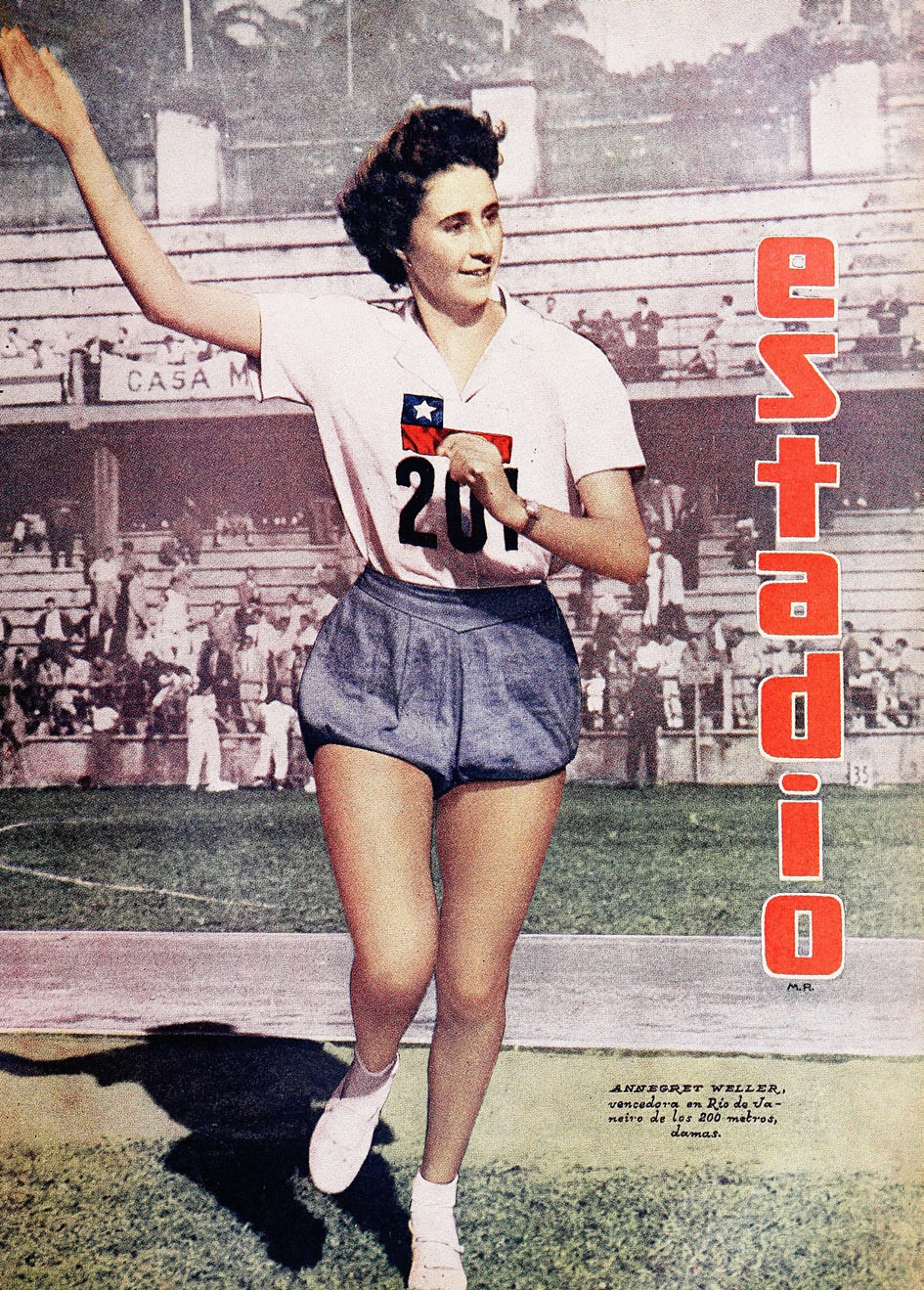

Personal information
- Full name: Anna Margarethe Weller Schneider
- Nationality: Chilean
- Born: 11 July 1930 (age 96) Santiago, Chile
- Height: 1.73 m (5 ft 8 in)
- Weight: 55 kg (121 lb)

Sport
- Sport: Sprinting
- Events: 100 metres, 200 metres

Anna Margarethe "Annegret" Weller Schneider (born 11 July 1930) is a Chilean sprinter.

== Biography ==
Born in Valdivia, Chile, to German parents, her first club she competed for was Gimnástico Alemán de Valparaíso. In 1943, she set a novice record with 7"2/10 in 50 meters. In May 1945, she was selected to compete in the South American Championships in Montevideo, achieving fifth place in her category.

Three years later, she competed in women's 200 metres at the 1948 Summer Olympics. She also participated in those Olympic Games as part of Chile's 4 × 100 m team, being part of the first Chilean women's team to take part in the Olympics, alongside Marion Huber, Betty Kretschmer, and Adriana Millard.

== International competitions ==
| Year | Competition | Venue | Position | Event | Notes |
Representing Chile
| 1945 | South American Championships | Montevideo, Uruguay | 6th | 100 m | NT |
| 1945 | South American Championships | Montevideo, Uruguay | 2nd | 4 × 100 m relay | 51.1 |
| 1946 | South American Championships (unofficial) | Santiago, Chile | 2nd | 100 m | 12.3 |
| 1946 | South American Championships (unofficial) | Santiago, Chile | 1st | 200 m | 25.8 |
| 1947 | South American Championships | Rio de Janeiro, Brazil | 2nd | 100 m | 12.7 |
| 1947 | South American Championships | Rio de Janeiro, Brazil | 1st | 200 m | 26.6 |
| 1947 | South American Championships | Rio de Janeiro, Brazil | 3rd | 4 × 100 m relay | 50.5 |
| 1948 | Olympic Games | London, United Kingdom | – (h) | 200 m | DQ |
| 1948 | Olympic Games | London, United Kingdom | 10th (h) | 4 × 100 m relay | 51.68 |
| 1949 | South American Championships | Lima, Peru | 6th | 100 m | 13.5 |
| 1949 | South American Championships | Lima, Peru | 6th (h) | 200 m | 27.1 |
| 1949 | South American Championships | Lima, Peru | 2nd | 4 × 100 m relay | 50.8 |

== Personal bests ==
- 100 metres – 11.9h (1945)
- 200 metres – 25.8h (1946)
