= 1953 South American Championships in Athletics (unofficial) – Results =

These are the results of the unofficial 1953 South American Championships in Athletics which took place at the Estadio Nacional in Santiago, Chile, between 19 and 26 April.

== Men's results ==
=== 100 metres ===
Heats – 18 April

Rank	Heat	Name	Nationality	Time	Notes
1	1	Romeo Galán	Argentina	10.7	Q
2	1	Gustavo Ehlers	Chile	10.9	Q
3	1	Benedito Ferreira	Brazil	10.9	
4	1	José Zelaya	Paraguay	11.1	
5	1	Walter Pérez	Uruguay	11.2	
1	2	Gerardo Bönnhoff	Argentina	10.7	Q
2	2	Francisco Kadlec	Brazil	10.9	Q
3	2	Arturo Flores	Ecuador	11.1	
4	2	Guillermo Sebastiani	Peru	11.2	
5	2	Fernando Serratti	Paraguay	11.4	
1	3	Gerardo Salazar	Peru	10.9	Q
2	3	Mario Fayos	Uruguay	11.0	Q
3	3	Hugo Krauss	Chile	11.3	
4	3	Armando Delgado	Ecuador	11.6	

Final – 19 April

Rank	Lane	Name	Nationality	Time	Notes
1st place, gold medalist(s)	3	Gerardo Bönnhoff	Argentina	10.9	
2nd place, silver medalist(s)	2	Romeo Galán	Argentina	11.0	
3rd place, bronze medalist(s)	4	Gerardo Salazar	Peru	11.0	
4	6	Francisco Kadlec	Brazil	11.2	
5	1	Mario Fayos	Uruguay	11.2	
6	5	Gustavo Ehlers	Chile	11.3	

=== 200 metres ===
Heats – 22 April

Rank	Heat	Name	Nationality	Time	Notes
1	1	Benedito Ferreira	Brazil	21.8	Q
2	1	Arturo Flores	Ecuador	22.1	Q
3	1	Mario Fayos	Uruguay	22.4	
4	1	Oscar Maldonado	Peru	22.6	
5	1	Fernando Serrati	Paraguay	23.1	
1	2	Gerardo Bönnhoff	Argentina	21.9	Q
2	2	Hugo Krauss	Chile	22.4	Q
3	2	Walter Pérez	Uruguay	22.4	
4	2	Manuel Sánchez	Ecuador	23.1	
	2	Guillermo Sebastiani	Peru	DQ	
1	3	Gustavo Ehlers	Chile	22.1	Q
2	3	Alexandre Pereira Neto	Brazil	22.2	Q
3	3	José Elías	Argentina	22.5	
4	3	José Zelaya	Paraguay	22.8	

Final – 23 April

Rank	Lane	Name	Nationality	Time	Notes
1st place, gold medalist(s)	6	Gerardo Bönnhoff	Argentina	21.8	
2nd place, silver medalist(s)	1	Benedito Ferreira	Brazil	21.8	
3rd place, bronze medalist(s)	2	Gustavo Ehlers	Chile	22.1	
4	3	Alexandre Pereira Neto	Brazil	22.2	
5	4	Hugo Krauss	Chile	22.6	
6	5	Arturo Flores	Ecuador	22.7	

=== 400 metres ===
Heats – 18 April

Rank	Heat	Name	Nationality	Time	Notes
1	1	Argemiro Roque	Brazil	49.3	Q
2	1	Ramón Sandoval	Chile	49.3	Q
3	1	Manuel Sánchez	Ecuador	51.7	
4	1	Óscar Ré	Paraguay	51.9	
1	2	Humberto Cabrera	Argentina	51.4	Q
2	2	Gustavo Ehlers	Chile	52.5	Q
3	2	José Barberis	Ecuador	53.2	
1	3	Ulisses dos Santos	Brazil	51.5	Q
2	3	Martín Beguiristain	Argentina	51.5	Q
3	3	Oscar Maldonado	Peru	53.0	

Final – 21 April

Rank	Lane	Name	Nationality	Time	Notes
1st place, gold medalist(s)	3	Argemiro Roque	Brazil	48.2	
2nd place, silver medalist(s)	2	Gustavo Ehlers	Chile	48.5	
3rd place, bronze medalist(s)	1	Ramón Sandoval	Chile	49.1	
4	4	Ulisses dos Santos	Brazil	49.5	
5	6	Martín Beguiristain	Argentina	50.3	
6	5	Humberto Cabrera	Argentina	1:00.8	

=== 800 metres ===
23 April

Rank	Name	Nationality	Time	Notes
1st place, gold medalist(s)	Ramón Sandoval	Chile	1:52.3	AR
2nd place, silver medalist(s)	Argemiro Roque	Brazil	1:53.7	
3rd place, bronze medalist(s)	Waldomiro Monteiro	Brazil	1:54.5	
4	Jorge Lombao	Argentina	1:54.8	
5	Eduardo Fontecilla	Chile	1:55.6	
6	Orlando Arévalo	Uruguay	1:56.2	NR
	Adán Torres	Argentina	NT	
	Juan López	Peru	NT	
	Óscar Ré	Paraguay	NT	
	Ignacio Paciello	Uruguay	NT	

=== 1500 metres ===
21 April

Rank	Name	Nationality	Time	Notes
1st place, gold medalist(s)	Guillermo Solá	Chile	3:58.6	
2nd place, silver medalist(s)	Juan Miranda	Argentina	4:00.4	
3rd place, bronze medalist(s)	Laudionor da Silva	Brazil	4:03.0	
4	Ricardo Vidal	Chile	4:03.8	
5	Antônio Roque	Brazil	4:05.5	
6	Orlando Arévalo	Uruguay	NT	
7	Óscar Guffanti	Uruguay	NT	
	Eduardo Balducci	Argentina	DQ	

=== 5000 metres ===
18 April

Rank	Name	Nationality	Time	Notes
1st place, gold medalist(s)	Osvaldo Suárez	Argentina	15:23.1	
2nd place, silver medalist(s)	Raúl Ibarra	Argentina	15:25.5	
3rd place, bronze medalist(s)	Luis Campusano	Chile	15:27.0	
4	Raúl Inostroza	Chile	15:29.0	
5	Pedro de Andrade	Brazil	15:33.7	
6	Edgard Mitt	Brazil	15:37.9	

=== 10,000 metres ===
23 April

Rank	Name	Nationality	Time	Notes
1st place, gold medalist(s)	Ricardo Bralo	Argentina	31:36.0	
2nd place, silver medalist(s)	Alfredo Cornejo	Chile	32:10.2	
3rd place, bronze medalist(s)	Raúl Ibarra	Argentina	32:19.2	
4	Pedro de Andrade	Brazil	33:35.6	
5	Germano Melchor	Brazil	33:43.2	
6	Gustavo Rojas	Chile	35:27.4	

=== Half marathon ===
26 April

Rank	Name	Nationality	Time	Notes
1st place, gold medalist(s)	Reinaldo Gorno	Argentina	1:09:47	
2nd place, silver medalist(s)	Ezequiel Bustamente	Argentina	1:09:49	
3rd place, bronze medalist(s)	Juan Gau	Uruguay	1:11:17	
4	Gustavo Rojas	Chile	1:12:29	
5	Germano Belchior	Brazil	1:13:23	
6	Gervasio Link	Brazil	1:13:38	
7	Viterbo Rivero	Uruguay	1:17:45	
	Raúl Inostroza	Chile	DNF	

=== 110 metres hurdles ===
Heats – 21 April

Rank	Heat	Name	Nationality	Time	Notes
1	1	Wilson Carneiro	Brazil	14.6	Q
2	1	Jörn Gevert	Chile	15.1	Q
3	1	Miguel Ángel González	Argentina	15.5	Q
4	1	Hernán Alzamora	Peru	15.5	
1	2	Estanislao Kocourek	Argentina	15.0	Q
2	2	Ijoel da Silva	Brazil	15.2	Q
3	2	Carlos Claro	Chile	16.1	Q

Final – 22 April

Rank	Lane	Name	Nationality	Time	Notes
1st place, gold medalist(s)	5	Estanislao Kocourek	Argentina	14.7	
2nd place, silver medalist(s)	4	Wilson Carneiro	Brazil	14.7	
3rd place, bronze medalist(s)	1	Ijoel da Silva	Brazil	15.0	
4	2	Jörn Gevert	Chile	15.2	
5	3	Carlos Claro	Chile	15.2	
6	6	Miguel Ángel González	Argentina	15.6	

=== 400 metres hurdles ===
Heats – 23 April

Rank	Heat	Name	Nationality	Time	Notes
1	1	Jörn Gevert	Chile	54.1	Q
2	1	Ulisses dos Santos	Brazil	55.4	Q
3	1	Juan Carlos Isola	Argentina	56.0	Q
4	1	Óscar Nietzel	Uruguay	56.7	
1	2	Wilson Carneiro	Brazil	53.4	Q
2	2	Humberto Cabrera	Argentina	56.3	Q
3	2	Mario Drouet	Ecuador	57.0	Q
	2	Reinaldo Martín	Chile	59.5	

Final – 25 April

Rank	Name	Nationality	Time	Notes
1st place, gold medalist(s)	Wilson Carneiro	Brazil	51.9	AR
2nd place, silver medalist(s)	Jörn Gevert	Chile	52.4	
3rd place, bronze medalist(s)	Humberto Cabrera	Argentina	53.9	
4	Ulisses dos Santos	Brazil	54.0	
5	Juan Carlos Isola	Argentina	57.8	
6	Mario Drouet	Ecuador	58.7	

=== 3000 metres steeplechase ===
25 April

Rank	Name	Nationality	Time	Notes
1st place, gold medalist(s)	Guillermo Solá	Chile	9:25.3	AR
2nd place, silver medalist(s)	Edgard Mitt	Brazil	9:28.8	NR
3rd place, bronze medalist(s)	Santiago Novas	Chile	9:29.7	
4	Pedro de Andrade	Brazil	9:42.6	
5	Víctor Ginés Salias	Argentina	9:57.8	
6	Viterbo Rivero	Uruguay	10:07.8	
7	Guillermo San Martín	Argentina	NT	

=== 4 × 100 metres relay ===
Heats – 23 April

Rank	Heat	Nation	Competitors	Time	Notes
1	1	Argentina	Enrique Beckles, Carlos Isaack, Gerardo Bönnhoff, Romeo Galán	41.2	Q
2	1	Brazil	Francisco Kadlec, Benedito Ferreira, Alexandre Pereira Neto, José Telles da Conceição	41.9	Q
3	1	Ecuador	Armando Delgado, Manuel Sánchez, Mario Drouet, Arturo Flores	43.6	Q
4	1	Paraguay	Fernando Serrati, Herman Doce, Óscar Ré, José Zelaya	44.3	NR
1	2	Peru	Gerardo Salazar, Máximo Reyes, Guillermo Sebastiani, Santiago Fernando	43.1	Q
2	2	Chile	Omile-Mascaró, Gustavo Ehlers, García, Hugo Krauss	43.8	Q
	2	Uruguay	Fermín Donazar, Aníbal Estrade, Óscar Nietzel, Walter Pérez	DQ	

Final – 25 April

Rank	Nation	Competitors	Time	Notes
1st place, gold medalist(s)	Brazil	Francisco Kadlec, Alexandre Pereira Neto, José Telles da Conceição, Benedito Ferreira	41.7	
2nd place, silver medalist(s)	Argentina	Carlos Isaack, Enrique Beckles, Gerardo Bönnhoff, Romeo Galán	41.9	
3rd place, bronze medalist(s)	Chile	Omile-Mascaró, Gustavo Ehlers, García, Hugo Krauss	42.6	
4	Ecuador	Arturo Flores, Mario Drouet, Manuel Sánchez, Armando Delgado	43.5	
5	Peru	Gerardo Salazar, Máximo Reyes, Guillermo Sebastiani, Santiago Fernando	45.0	

=== 4 × 400 metres relay ===
26 April

Rank	Nation	Competitors	Time	Notes
1st place, gold medalist(s)	Brazil	Wilson Carneiro, Mário do Nascimento, Ulisses dos Santos, Argemiro Roque	3:15.5	AR
2nd place, silver medalist(s)	Chile	Jörn Gevert, Reinaldo Martín, Ramón Sandoval, Gustavo Ehlers	3:17.1	
3rd place, bronze medalist(s)	Argentina	Martín Beguiristain, José Elías, Humberto Cabrera, Gerardo Bönnhoff	3:19.1	
4	Ecuador	Arturo Flores, José Barberis, Manuel Sánchez, Mario Drouet	3:23.6	NR
5	Uruguay	Óscar Guffanti, Orlando Arévalo, Ignacio Paciello, Óscar Nietzel	3:26.1	
6	Paraguay	Óscar Ré, Fernando Serrati, Aldo Zuccolillo, José Zelaya	3:30.6	

=== High jump ===
18 April

Rank	Name	Nationality	Result	Notes
1st place, gold medalist(s)	José Telles da Conceição	Brazil	1.93	
2nd place, silver medalist(s)	Ernesto Lagos	Chile	1.93	
3rd place, bronze medalist(s)	Carlos Puebla	Chile	1.85	
4	Roberto Méndez Parry	Argentina	1.80	
5	Aldo Zuccolillo	Paraguay	1.80	
6	Alberto Bacan	Brazil	1.80	

=== Pole vault ===
22 April

Rank	Name	Nationality	3.20	3.50	3.60	3.70	3.80	3.90	Result	Notes
1st place, gold medalist(s)	Eduardo Montes de Oca	Argentina	–	–	–	–	o	xxx	3.80	
2nd place, silver medalist(s)	Hélcio da Silva	Brazil	–	–	–	xo	xo	xxx	3.80	
3rd place, bronze medalist(s)	Luis Ganoza	Peru	–	–	o	–	xxx		3.60	
4	Carlos Vera	Chile	o		o				3.60	
5	Carlos Puebla	Chile							3.50	

=== Long jump ===
21 April

Rank	Name	Nationality	#1	#2	#3	#4	#5	#6	Result	Notes
1st place, gold medalist(s)	Ary de Sá	Brazil	7.31	7.18	7.15	7.19	7.26	7.17	7.31	
2nd place, silver medalist(s)	Aldo Zuccolillo	Paraguay	x	6.33	6.89	6.94	7.05	7.17	7.17	NR
3rd place, bronze medalist(s)	Ahylton da Conceição	Brazil	x	7.00	x	7.08	7.16	x	7.16	
4	Fermín Donazar	Uruguay			6.91				6.91	
5	Albino Geist	Argentina							6.90	
6	Carlos Vera	Chile	6.89		x	x		x	6.89	
	Carlos Gaete	Chile							6.53	

=== Triple jump ===
23 April

Rank	Name	Nationality	#1	#2	#3	#4	#5	#6	Result	Notes
1st place, gold medalist(s)	Adhemar da Silva	Brazil	15.05	15.59	15.40	15.35	x	15.61	15.61	
2nd place, silver medalist(s)	Renato do Nascimento	Brazil							14.95	
3rd place, bronze medalist(s)	Alberto Betalleluz	Peru							14.08	
4	Claudio Arteaga	Chile							14.06	
5	José Chalot	Chile							13.94	
6	Fermín Donazar	Uruguay							13.54	
7	Martín Rientemberg	Uruguay							13.50	
8	Alfredo Camilletti	Argentina							13.47	

=== Shot put ===
19 April

Rank	Name	Nationality	Result	Notes
1st place, gold medalist(s)	Alcides Dambrós	Brazil	15.08	
2nd place, silver medalist(s)	Rubén Scaraffia	Argentina	13.74	
3rd place, bronze medalist(s)	Nadim Marreis	Brazil	13.61	
4	Leonardo Kittsteiner	Chile	13.25	
5	Leonardo Patiño	Peru	12.94	
6	Gerardo Mielke	Argentina	12.52	

=== Discus throw ===
25 April

Rank	Name	Nationality	Result	Notes
1st place, gold medalist(s)	Eduardo Julve	Peru	46.82	
2nd place, silver medalist(s)	Elvio Porta	Argentina	46.68	
3rd place, bronze medalist(s)	Pedro Ucke	Argentina	44.86	
4	Hernán Haddad	Chile	44.44	
5	Nadim Marreis	Brazil	44.35	
6	Alcides Dambrós	Brazil	43.91	
7	Armin Neverman	Chile	?	
8	Enrique Vázquez	Uruguay	?	
9	Pablo Freund	Ecuador	?	

=== Hammer throw ===
22 April

Rank	Name	Nationality	#1	#2	#3	#4	#5	#6	Result	Notes
1st place, gold medalist(s)	Arturo Melcher	Chile	47.78	49.14	48.11	44.87	47.62	45.19	49.14	
2nd place, silver medalist(s)	Elvio Porta	Argentina	47.03	x	47.97	48.31	48.75	x	48.75	
3rd place, bronze medalist(s)	Alejandro Díaz	Chile	48.36	x	47.26	x	48.65	x	48.65	
4	Emilio Ortiz	Argentina							46.92	
5	Walter Kupper	Brazil							46.22	
6	Enrique Vásquez	Uruguay							45.24	

=== Javelin throw ===
18 April – old model

Rank	Name	Nationality	Result	Notes
1st place, gold medalist(s)	Ricardo Héber	Argentina	68.23	
2nd place, silver medalist(s)	Janis Stendzenieks	Chile	64.94	
3rd place, bronze medalist(s)	Gerardo Mielke	Argentina	61.96	
4	Francisco Céspedes	Chile	57.15	
5	Carlos Monge	Peru	49.59	
	Riverino	Brazil	DNS	

=== Decathlon ===
25–26 April – 1952 tables (1985 conversions given with *)

The highest mark recorded in each event is highlighted in yellow

Rank	Athlete	Nationality	100m	LJ	SP	HJ	400m	110m H	DT	PV	JT	1500m	Points	Conv.	Notes
1st place, gold medalist(s)	Carlos Vera	Chile	11.2	7.01	10.12	1.75	53.1	16.2	31.90	3.50	39.23	5:09.6	5436	*5935	
2nd place, silver medalist(s)	Francisco Moura	Brazil	11.4	6.97	10.31	1.75	52.4	16.4	30.53	3.20	43.41	5:01.2	5359	*5915	
3rd place, bronze medalist(s)	Hércules Azcune	Uruguay	11.9	6.18	11.87	1.80	53.4	18.4	34.14	3.40	48.53	4:49.4	5291	*5870	
4	Raúl Osorio	Chile	11.5	5.98	10.69	1.70	52.2	16.5	30.54	4.30	45.01	4:40.0	5248	*5819	
5	Aldo Ribeiro	Brazil	11.9	6.20	10.62	1.65	52.5	16.2	30.31	3.10	49.88	4:54.0	5209	*5795	
6	Hernán Alzamora	Peru	11.7	5.90	10.56	1.75	54.3	15.7	29.32	3.20	46.20	5:04.7	5011	*5617	
7	Roberto Méndez Parry	Argentina	11.6	6.42	10.34	1.80	54.3	16.7	31.96	2.90	32.87	4:56.3	4919	*4991	
8	Ricardo Héber	Argentina	11.5	6.62	12.63	1.55	55.9	20.2	28.15	2.90	63.70	DNF	4414		
9	Herman Doce	Paraguay	11.7	6.50	11.33	1.65	53.4	17.2	29.61	NM	37.73	5:01.5	4405		

== Women's results ==
=== 100 metres ===
Heats – 18 April

Rank	Heat	Name	Nationality	Time	Notes
1	1	Lilián Buglia	Argentina	12.3	Q
2	1	Adriana Millard	Chile	12.3	Q
3	1	Helena de Menezes	Brazil	12.7	Q
4	1	Beatriz Daher	Uruguay	12.9	
1	2	Lilian Heinz	Argentina	12.4	Q
2	2	Deyse de Castro	Brazil	12.5	Q
3	2	Aurora Bianchi	Chile	12.9	Q

Final – 19 April

Rank	Name	Nationality	Time	Notes
1st place, gold medalist(s)	Lilián Buglia	Argentina	12.6	
2nd place, silver medalist(s)	Deyse de Castro	Brazil	12.7	
3rd place, bronze medalist(s)	Lilian Heinz	Argentina	12.8	
4	Adriana Millard	Chile	12.8	
5	Helena de Menezes	Brazil	12.9	
6	Aurora Bianchi	Chile	13.2	

=== 200 metres ===
Heats – 22 April

Rank	Heat	Name	Nationality	Time	Notes
1	1	Adriana Millard	Chile	25.7	Q
2	1	Gladys Erbetta	Argentina	26.0	Q
3	1	Benedicta de Oliveira	Brazil	26.5	Q
4	1	Zudema Álvarez	Uruguay	27.4	
1	2	Lilian Heinz	Argentina	25.6	Q, NR
2	2	Deyse de Castro	Brazil	26.3	Q
3	2	Beatriz Daher	Uruguay	26.4	Q, NR
4	2	Aurora Bianchi	Chile	26.8	

Final – 23 April

Rank	Name	Nationality	Time	Notes
1st place, gold medalist(s)	Deyse de Castro	Brazil	25.2	
2nd place, silver medalist(s)	Lilian Heinz	Argentina	25.6	=NR
3rd place, bronze medalist(s)	Gladys Erbetta	Argentina	26.0	
4	Benedicta de Oliveira	Brazil	26.2	
5	Beatriz Daher	Uruguay	26.8	
	Adriana Millard	Chile	DNF	

=== 80 metres hurdles ===
Heats – 25 April

Rank	Heat	Name	Nationality	Time	Notes
1	1	Anice Burgos	Brazil	12.6	Q
2	1	Lisa Peters	Chile	12.7	Q
3	1	Elba Damiani	Argentina	12.7	Q
4	1	Sara Anza	Uruguay	14.2	
1	2	Wanda dos Santos	Brazil	11.9	Q
2	2	Eliana Gaete	Chile	11.9	Q
3	2	Teresa Carvajal	Argentina	12.5	Q

Final – 26 April

Rank	Lane	Name	Nationality	Time	Notes
1st place, gold medalist(s)	3	Wanda dos Santos	Brazil	11.7	
2nd place, silver medalist(s)	1	Eliana Gaete	Chile	11.7	
3rd place, bronze medalist(s)	5	Anice Burgos	Brazil	12.3	
4	2	Teresa Carvajal	Argentina	12.4	
5	6	Elba Damiani	Argentina	12.4	
6	4	Lisa Peters	Chile	12.6	

=== 4 × 100 metres relay ===
26 April

Rank	Lane	Nation	Competitors	Time	Notes
1st place, gold medalist(s)	2	Brazil	Deyse de Castro, Benedita de Oliveira, Helena de Menezes, Melânia Luz	48.2	AR
2nd place, silver medalist(s)	4	Argentina	Lilian Heinz, Olga Bianchi, Lilián Buglia, Gladys Erbetta	48.7	
3rd place, bronze medalist(s)	5	Chile	María Angélica Cañas, Aurora Bianchi, Eliana Gaete, Lisa Peters	50.3	
4	3	Uruguay	Zulma Álvarez, Beatriz Daher, María Perla Anza, Sara Anza	51.1	

=== High jump ===
25 April

Rank	Name	Nationality	1.40	1.45	1.50	1.55	1.60	Result	Notes
1st place, gold medalist(s)	Deyse de Castro	Brazil	–	–	o	xo	xxx	1.55	
2nd place, silver medalist(s)	Elizabeth Müller	Brazil	–	o	o	xxx		1.50	
3rd place, bronze medalist(s)	María Angélica Cañas	Chile						1.45	
4	Julia Alfisi	Argentina						1.40	
5	Erika Berkhoff	Chile						1.40	
	Gladys Erbetta	Argentina	xxx					NM	

=== Long jump ===
21 April

Rank	Name	Nationality	#1	#2	#3	#4	#5	#6	Result	Notes
1st place, gold medalist(s)	Gladys Erbetta	Argentina	5.54	5.35	5.17	x	5.25	4.81	5.54	
2nd place, silver medalist(s)	Lisa Peters	Chile	5.19	4.89	5.27	5.19	5.46	5.29	5.46	
3rd place, bronze medalist(s)	Lilián Buglia	Argentina	5.29	5.18	5.19	5.29		5.45	5.45	
4	Wanda dos Santos	Brazil	5.13	5.21	5.07	5.33	5.41	5.20	5.41	
5	Beatriz Daher	Uruguay	x	5.13	5.05	4.99	5.30	5.11.	5.30	NR
6	Helena de Menezes	Brazil	4.99	5.11	x	4.80	4.98	x	5.11	
	Adriana Millard	Chile	x	x	x				NM	

=== Shot put ===
23 April

Rank	Name	Nationality	#1	#2	#3	#4	#5	#6	Result	Notes
1st place, gold medalist(s)	Vera Trezoitko	Brazil	11.39	10.72	11.45	11.09	11.22	11.91	11.91	
2nd place, silver medalist(s)	Isabel Avellán	Argentina							11.37	
3rd place, bronze medalist(s)	Elizabeth Müller	Brazil							11.11	
4	Ingeborg Pfüller	Argentina							11.07	
5	Pradelia Delgado	Chile							11.03	
6	Nelly Wiederholtz	Chile							10.21	

=== Discus throw ===
18 April

Rank	Name	Nationality	Result	Notes
1st place, gold medalist(s)	Isabel Avellán	Argentina	41.17	
2nd place, silver medalist(s)	Ingeborg Pfüller	Argentina	39.09	
3rd place, bronze medalist(s)	Erika Trömel	Chile	38.18	
4	Ilse Gerdau	Brazil	36.67	
5	Pradelia Delgado	Chile	35.24	
6	Vera Trezoitko	Brazil	34.36	

=== Javelin throw ===
26 April – old model

Rank	Name	Nationality	#1	#2	#3	#4	#5	#6	Result	Notes
1st place, gold medalist(s)	Anneliese Schmidt	Brazil	36.95	37.83	38.26	39.67	38.88	34.18	39.67	NR
2nd place, silver medalist(s)	Adriana Silva	Chile							38.20	
3rd place, bronze medalist(s)	Carmen Venegas	Chile							37.43	
4	Ilse Gerdau	Brazil							37.21	
5	Clelia Moreira	Argentina							27.22	
6	Isabel Avellán	Argentina							21.06	
