= Raúl Inostroza =

Chilean long-distance runner

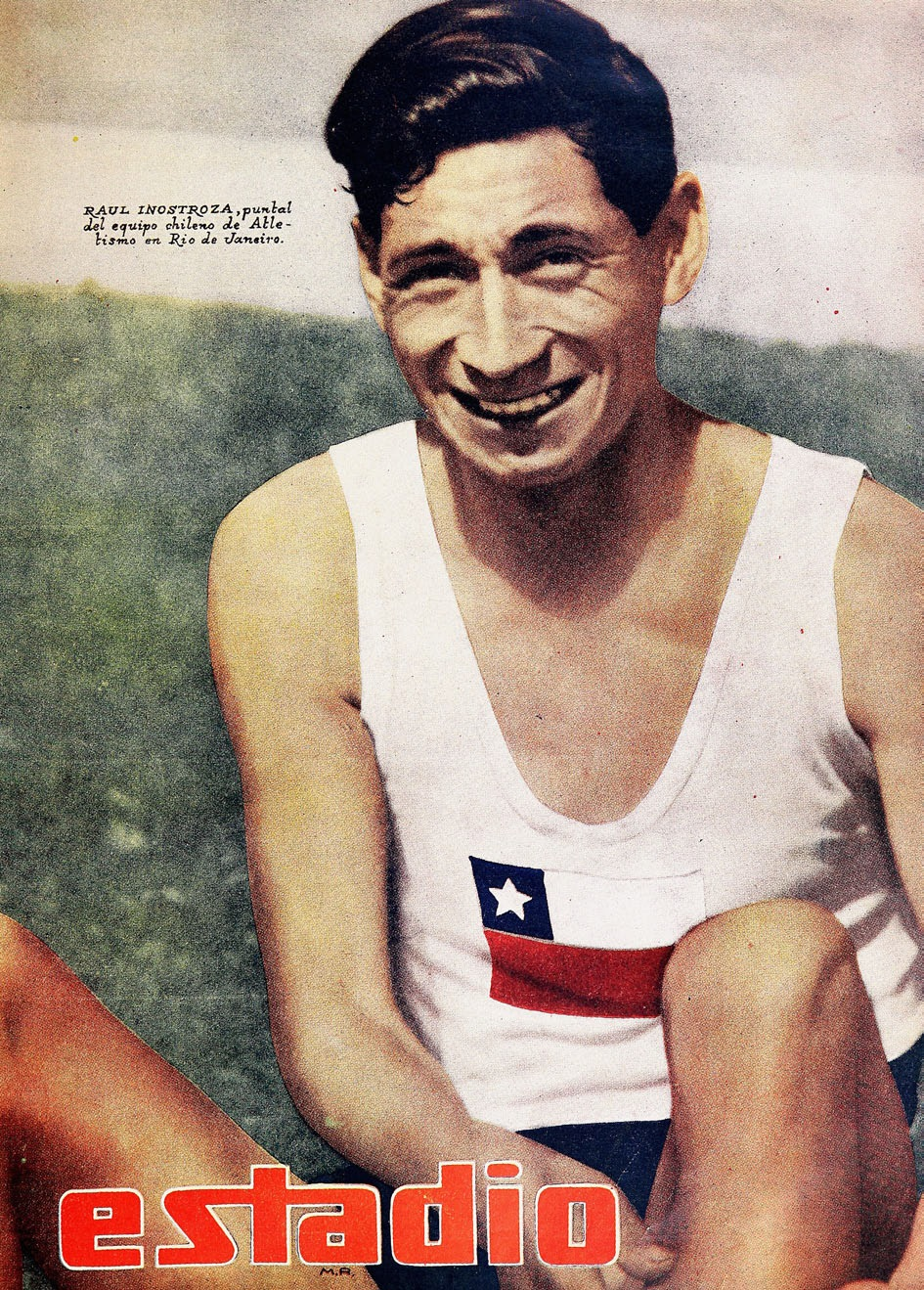

Personal information
- Full name: Raúl Ernesto Inostroza Donoso
- Nationality: Chilean
- Born: 10 September 1921 Santiago, Chile
- Died: July 30, 1975 (aged 53) Santiago, Chile

Sport
- Sport: Long-distance running
- Event: Marathon

Raúl Ernesto Inostroza Donoso (10 September 1921 – 30 July 1975) was a Chilean long-distance runner. He competed in the marathon at the 1952 Summer Olympics.

== International competitions ==
Year	Competition	Venue	Position	Event	Notes
Representing Chile
1941	South American Championships	Buenos Aires, Argentina	3rd	5000 m	15:13.3
1941	South American Championships	Buenos Aires, Argentina	2nd	Cross country	37:18.0
1943	South American Championships	Santiago, Chile	1st	3000 m	8:32.4
1943	South American Championships	Santiago, Chile	1st	5000 m	15:00.0
1943	South American Championships	Santiago, Chile	1st	Cross country	46:08.0
1945	South American Championships	Montevideo, Uruguay	1st	3000 m	8:41.8
1945	South American Championships	Montevideo, Uruguay	2nd	5000 m	15:04.6
1946	South American Championships (unofficial)	Santiago, Chile	1st	5000 m	15:06.2
1946	South American Championships (unofficial)	Santiago, Chile	2nd	10,000 m	32:35.2
1947	South American Championships	Rio de Janeiro, Brazil	3rd	1500 m	4:01.7
1947	South American Championships	Rio de Janeiro, Brazil	2nd	3000 m	8:45.0
1947	South American Championships	Rio de Janeiro, Brazil	1st	5000 m	15:07.8
1949	South American Championships	Lima, Peru	4th	1500 m	4:03.5
1949	South American Championships	Lima, Peru	1st	3000 m	8:49.2
1949	South American Championships	Lima, Peru	3rd	5000 m	15:18.8
1949	South American Championships	Lima, Peru	4th	10,000 m	32:17.1
1950	South American Championships (unofficial)	Montevideo, Uruguay	1st	1500 m	4:02.4
1950	South American Championships (unofficial)	Montevideo, Uruguay	2nd	3000 m	8:43.4
1950	South American Championships (unofficial)	Montevideo, Uruguay	2nd	5000 m	15:15.2
1951	Pan American Games	Buenos Aires, Argentina	5th	5000 m	NT
1952	South American Championships	Buenos Aires, Argentina	1st	5000 m	14:59.8
1952	South American Championships	Buenos Aires, Argentina	2nd	10,000 m	31:26.9
1952	Olympic Games	Helsinki, Finland	23rd	10,000 m	31:28.6
1952	Olympic Games	Helsinki, Finland	–	Marathon	DNF
1953	South American Championships (unofficial)	Santiago, Chile	4th	5000 m	15:29.0
1953	South American Championships (unofficial)	Santiago, Chile	–	Half marathon	DNF

== Personal bests ==
- 3000 metres – 8:32.4h (1943)
- 5000 metres – 14:53.5h (1950)
- 10,000 metres – 31:26.9h (1952)
- Marathon – 2:47:48 (1948)
