= Santiago Ferrando =

Peruvian sprinter (born 1928)

Santiago Ferrando Dietz
Personal information
- Nationality: Peruvian
- Born: 7 June 1928

Sport
- Sport: Sprinting
- Events: 100 metres 200 metres
Medal record
Men's athletics
Representing Peru
South American Championships
Gold medal – first place	1949 Lima	4 × 100m relay
Silver medal – second place	1947 Rio de Janeiro	100m
Bolivarian Games
Silver medal – second place	1947–48 Quito	100m
Silver medal – second place	1947–48 Quito	200m

Santiago Ferrando Dietz (born 7 June 1928) is a Peruvian former sprinter. He competed in the men's 100 metres at the 1948 Summer Olympics.

== International competitions ==
Year	Competition	Venue	Position	Event	Notes
Representing Peru
1947	South American Championships	Rio de Janeiro, Brazil	2nd	100 m	11.2
1947	South American Championships	Rio de Janeiro, Brazil	4th	200 m	22.5
1947	South American Championships	Rio de Janeiro, Brazil	5th	4 × 100 m relay	NT
1947	South American Championships	Rio de Janeiro, Brazil	5th	4 × 400 m relay	NT
1947	Bolivarian Games	Lima, Peru	2nd	100 m	22.5
1947	Bolivarian Games	Lima, Peru	2nd	200 m	22.0
1947	Bolivarian Games	Lima, Peru	2nd	4 × 100 m relay	42.4
1947	Bolivarian Games	Lima, Peru	2nd	4 × 400 m relay	3:22.8
1948	Olympic Games	London, United Kingdom	38th (h)	100 m	11.19
1948	Olympic Games	London, United Kingdom	5th (qf)	200 m	NT
1949	South American Championships	Lima, Peru	5th (h)	100 m	11.0
1949	South American Championships	Lima, Peru	1st	4 × 100 m relay	42.3
1951	Pan American Games	Buenos Aires, Argentina	6th	4 × 100 m relay	NT
1952	South American Championships	Buenos Aires, Argentina	15th (h)	200 m	23.2
1952	South American Championships	Buenos Aires, Argentina	14th (h)	400 m	58.1
1954	South American Championships	São Paulo, Brazil	4th	4 × 400 m relay	3:26.6
