= Eduardo Julve =

Peruvian discus thrower

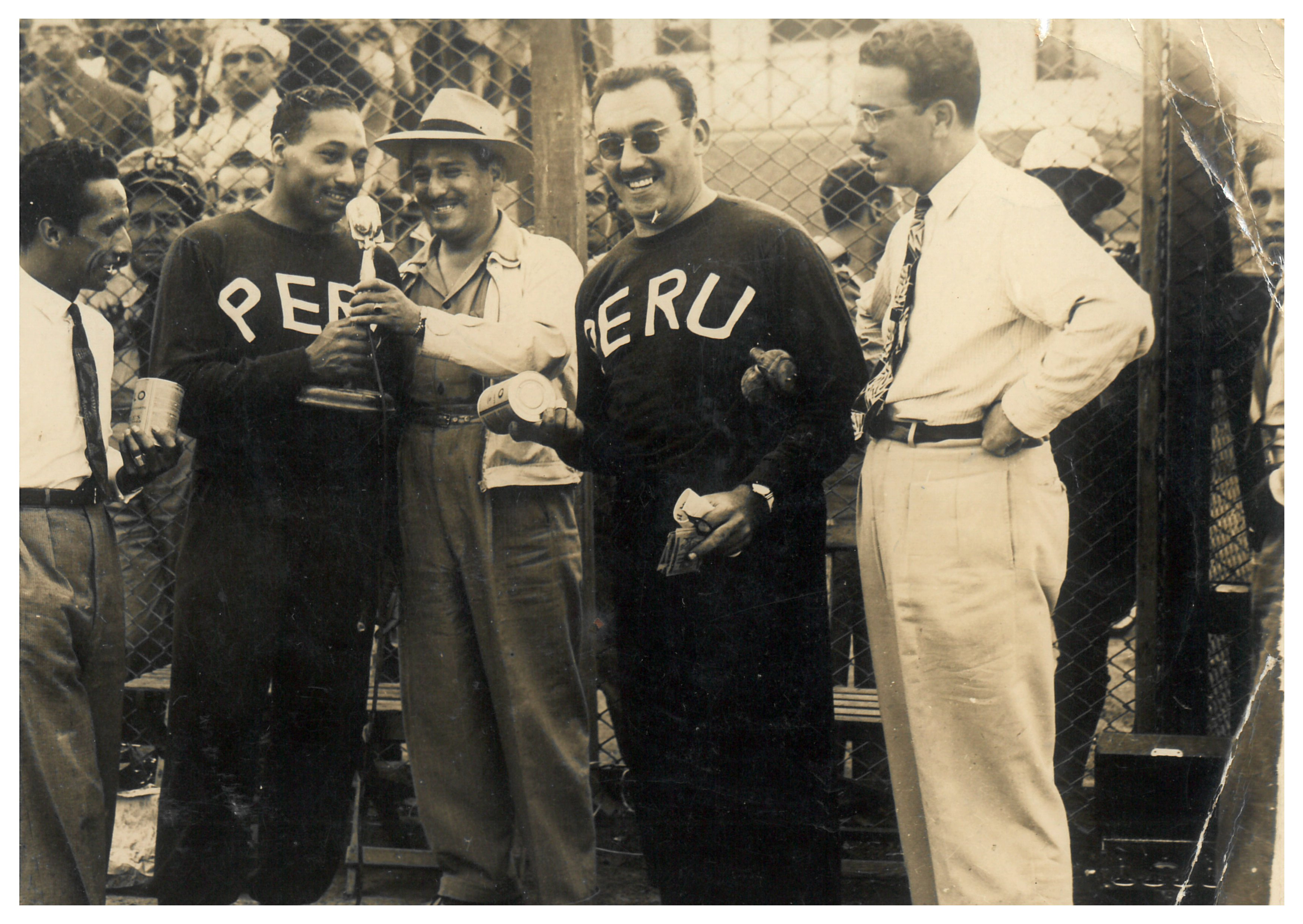
- Eduardo Julve y Leonelo Patiño

Personal information
- Full name: Eduardo Julve Ciriaco
- Born: 27 August 1923 Chincha Alta, Peru
- Died: 2008 (aged 84–85)

Sport
- Country: Peru
- Sport: Discus throw

Eduardo Julve Ciriaco (27 August 1923 – 2008) was a Peruvian discus thrower. He was born in Chincha Alta. He competed at the 1948 Summer Olympics in London, where he placed 12th in the discus final. He also competed in decathlon. Julve died in 2008.

== International competitions (athletics) ==
| Year | Competition | Venue | Position | Event | Notes |
Representing Peru
| 1941 | South American Championships | Buenos Aires, Argentina | 8th | Discus throw | 40.58 m |
| 1941 | South American Championships | Buenos Aires, Argentina | 6th | Decathlon | 5868 pts |
| 1943 | South American Championships | Santiago, Chile | 4th | Shot Put | 12.61 m |
| 1943 | South American Championships | Santiago, Chile | 2nd | Discus throw | 41.64 m |
| 1943 | South American Championships | Santiago, Chile | 2nd | Decathlon | 6046 pts |
| 1946 | South American Championships (unofficial) | Santiago, Chile | 1st | Discus throw | 43.12 m |
| 1947 | South American Championships | Rio de Janeiro, Brazil | 8th | Shot Put | 12.75 m |
| 1947 | South American Championships | Rio de Janeiro, Brazil | 2nd | Discus throw | 44.07 m |
| 1947 | South American Championships | Rio de Janeiro, Brazil | 2nd | Decathlon | 6460 pts |
| 1947 | Bolivarian Games | Lima, Peru | 2nd | Shot Put | 13.68 m |
| 1947 | Bolivarian Games | Lima, Peru | 1st | Discus throw | 44.54 m |
| 1947 | Bolivarian Games | Lima, Peru | 2nd | Javelin throw | 50.81 m |
| 1947 | Bolivarian Games | Lima, Peru | 1st | Pentathlon | 3086 pts |
| 1948 | Olympic Games | London, United Kingdom | 12th | Discus throw | 44.05 m |
| 1948 | Olympic Games | London, United Kingdom | – | Decathlon | DNF |
| 1949 | South American Championships | Lima, Peru | 4th | Discus throw | 43.91 m |
| 1949 | South American Championships | Lima, Peru | 3rd | Decathlon | 6048 pts |
| 1950 | South American Championships (unofficial) | Montevideo, Uruguay | 1st | Long jump | 6.52 m |
| 1950 | South American Championships (unofficial) | Montevideo, Uruguay | 1st | Shot put | 13.77 m |
| 1950 | South American Championships (unofficial) | Montevideo, Uruguay | 1st | Discus throw | 47.50 m |
| 1950 | South American Championships (unofficial) | Montevideo, Uruguay | 3rd | Decathlon | 6231 pts |
| 1952 | South American Championships | Buenos Aires, Argentina | 4th | Discus throw | 44.92 m |
| 1953 | South American Championships (unofficial) | Santiago, Chile | 1st | Discus throw | 46.82 m |
| 1954 | South American Championships | São Paulo, Brazil | 1st | Discus throw | 47.44 m |
| 1956 | South American Championships | Santiago, Chile | 4th | Discus throw | 45.49 m |
| 1958 | South American Championships | Montevideo, Uruguay | 7th | Discus throw | 44.10 m |

== Personal bests ==
- Discus throw – 48.53 m (1947)
- Decathlon – 6117 pts (1947)
