= 1946 South American Championships in Athletics (unofficial) =

Unofficial South American Championships in Athletics
- Dates: April
- Host city: Santiago, Chile
- Level: Senior
- Events: 31

The unofficial South American Championships in Athletics were held in the Chilean capital, Santiago, during April 1946. The event, entitled "II Campeonato Sudamericano Extraordinario Barón Pierre de Coubertin", was held in celebration of the 50th anniversary of the modern Olympic Games.

== Medal summary ==
Medal winners are published.

=== Men ===
Event	Gold		Silver		Bronze	
100 metres	Alberto Labarthe (CHI)	10.5	José de Assis (BRA)	10.6	Carlos Silva (CHI)	10.8
200 metres	Alberto Triulzi (ARG)	21.9	Alberto Labarthe (CHI)	22.0	Adelio Márquez (ARG)	22.1
400 metres	Jorge Ehlers (CHI)	49.0	Antonio Pocovi (ARG)	49.1	Rosalvo Ramos (BRA)	49.2
800 metres	Agenor da Silva (BRA)	1:53.8	Antonio Pocovi (ARG)	1:54.0	Roberto Yokota (CHI)	1:54.3
1500 metres	Agenor da Silva (BRA)	4:00.3	Ricardo Bralo (ARG)	4:01.9	Guillermo García (CHI)	4:04.6
3000 metres	Miguel Castro (CHI)	8:44.8	Delfo Cabrera (ARG)	8:47.7	Melchor Palmeiro (ARG)	8:55.8
5000 metres	Raúl Inostroza (CHI)	15:06.2	Miguel Castro (CHI)	15:17.6	Reinaldo Gorno (ARG)	15:21.6
10,000 metres	Delfo Cabrera (ARG)	32:35.0	Raúl Inostroza (CHI)	32:35.2	René Millas (CHI)	33:00.8
20 kilometres road race	Reinaldo Gorno (ARG)	1:09:03	Corsino Fernández (ARG)	1:10:05	Julio Montecinos (CHI)	1:12:10
110 metres hurdles	Mario Recordón (CHI)	14.4	Alberto Triulzi (ARG)	14.6	Jorge Undurraga (CHI)	14.9
400 metres hurdles	Hércules Azcune (URU)	54.0	Víctor Henríquez (CHI)	55.3	Gustavo Ehlers (CHI)	55.7
High jump	Carlos Altamirano (CHI)	1.90	Antonio Barrionuevo (ARG)	1.90	Alfredo Jadresic (CHI)	1.90
Pole vault	Lúcio de Castro (BRA)	3.90	Federico Horn (CHI)	3.80	Carlos Baumann (ARG)	3.60
Long jump	Geraldo de Oliveira (BRA)	7.03	Alberto Eggeling (CHI)	7.01	Alfredo Meynet (CHI)	6.86
Triple jump	Geraldo de Oliveira (BRA)	15.00	Hélio da Silva (BRA)	14.84	Néstor Tenorio (ARG)	14.60
Shot put	Julián Llorente (ARG)	14.35	Emilio Malchiodi (ARG)	14.08	Emilio Stelig (BRA)	13.75
Discus throw	Eduardo Julve (PER)	43.12	Karsten Brödersen (CHI)	42.96	Emilio Malchiodi (ARG)	41.66
Hammer throw	Assis Naban (BRA)	48.69	Juan Fusé (ARG)	48.67	Edmundo Zúñiga (CHI)	47.14
Javelin throw	Efraín Santibáñez (CHI)	56.51	Francisco Céspedes (CHI)	54.71	Lúcio de Castro (BRA)	54.31
Decathlon	Mario Recordón (CHI)	6886	Celso Dória (BRA)	6325	Raimundo Rodrigues (BRA)	6261
4 × 100 metres relay	Argentina	41.9	Chile	42.6	Uruguay	42.6
4 × 400 metres relay	Chile	3:17.4	Argentina	3:18.8	Brazil	3:20.7

=== Women ===
Event	Gold		Silver		Bronze	
100 metres	Beatriz Kretschmer (CHI)	12.3	Anegret Weller (CHI)	12.3	Elizabeth Müller (BRA)	12.7
200 metres	Anegret Weller (CHI)	25.8	Elizabeth Müller (BRA)	25.8	María Vadulli (CHI)	26.6
80 metres hurdles	Beatriz Kretschmer (CHI)	12.7	Lourdes de Abreu (BRA)	13.4		
High jump	Ilse Barends (CHI)	1.63	Elizabeth Müller (BRA)	1.50	Gerda Martín (CHI)	1.45
Long jump	Beatriz Kretschmer (CHI)	5.20	Elizabeth Müller (BRA)	5.11	Lucy Lake (CHI)	4.96
Shot put	Edith Klempau (CHI)	11.55	Elizabeth Müller (BRA)	11.44	Lore Zippelius (CHI)	10.93
Discus throw	Edith Klempau (CHI)	35.03	Lore Zippelius (CHI)	34.71	Ivete Mariz (BRA)	34.71
Javelin throw	Gerda Martín (CHI)	35.78	Ivete Mariz (BRA)	33.84	Edith Klempau (CHI)	33.63
4 × 100 metres relay	Chile	49.5	Argentina	50.7	Brazil	50.8

== Medal table (unofficial) ==
* Host nation (Chile)

Rank	Nation	Gold	Silver	Bronze	Total
1	Chile (CHI)*	18	11	15	44
2	Brazil (BRA)	6	9	8	23
3	Argentina (ARG)	5	11	6	22
4	Uruguay (URU)	1	0	1	2
5	Peru (PER)	1	0	0	1
Totals (5 entries)		31	31	30	92
