= Jörn Gevert =

Chilean hurdler (1929–2017)

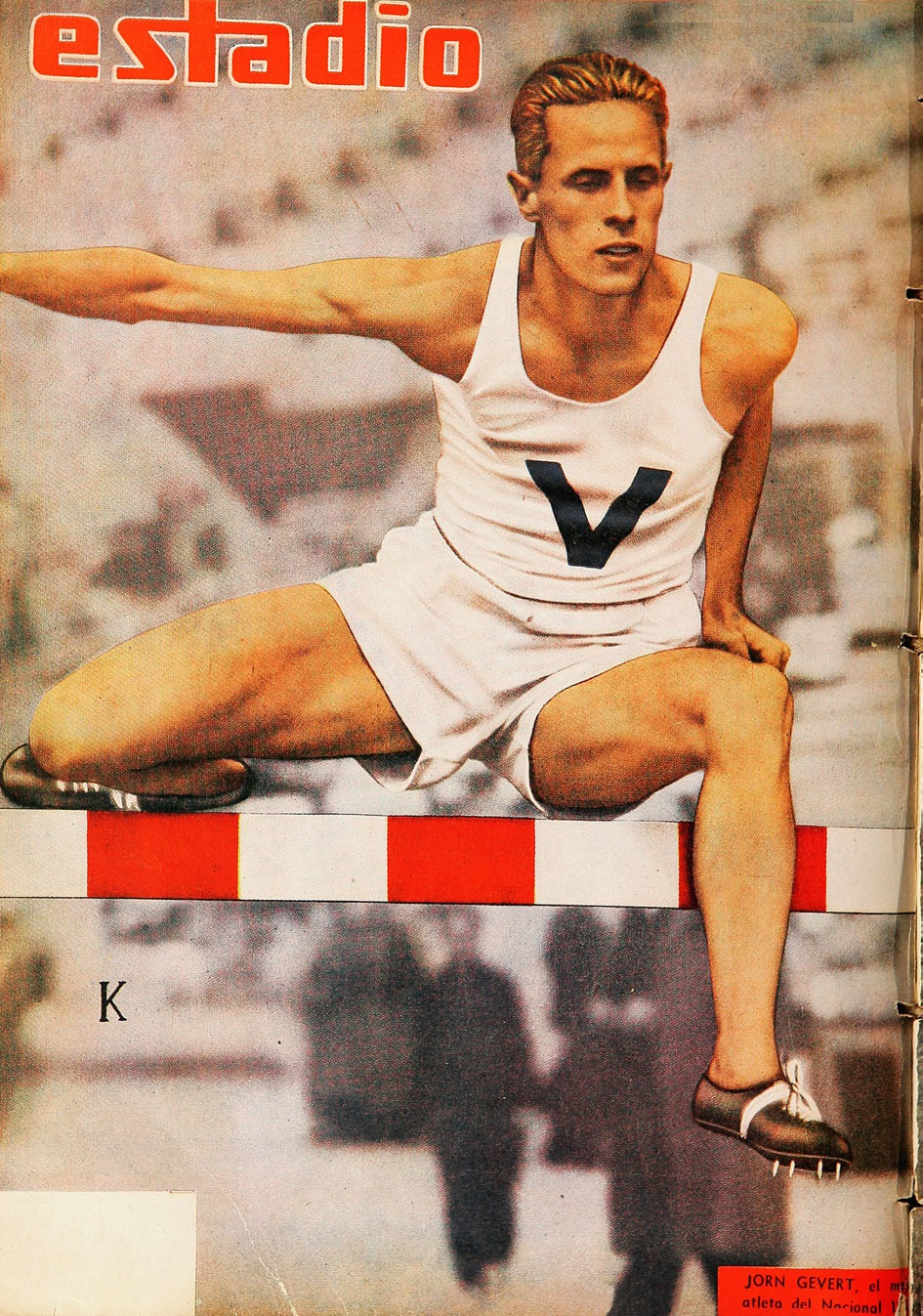

Personal information
- Full name: Gerd Jörn Gevert Schwarzlose
- Born: 16 March 1929 Santiago, Chile
- Died: 13 September 2017 (aged 88)
- Height: 1.92 m (6 ft 4 in)
- Weight: 75 kg (165 lb)

Sport
- Sport: Track and field
- Events: 110 metres hurdles, 400 metres hurdles

Gerd Jörn Gevert Schwarzlose (16 March 1929 – 13 September 2017) was a Chilean hurdler. He competed in the men's 110 metres hurdles at the 1952 Summer Olympics.

== International competitions ==
Year	Competition	Venue	Position	Event	Notes
Representing Chile
1949	South American Championships	Lima, Peru	5th	110 m hurdles	15.6
1949	South American Championships	Lima, Peru	5th	Triple jump	14.405 m
1950	South American Championships (unofficial)	Montevideo, Uruguay	2nd	200 m	22.7
1950	South American Championships (unofficial)	Montevideo, Uruguay	1st	110 m hurdles	15.2
1950	South American Championships (unofficial)	Montevideo, Uruguay	2nd	High jump	1.85 m
1950	South American Championships (unofficial)	Montevideo, Uruguay	2nd	Triple jump	13.59 m
1951	Pan American Games	Buenos Aires, Argentina	8th (h)	110 m hurdles	15.4
1951	Pan American Games	Buenos Aires, Argentina	8th (h)	400 m hurdles	15.4
1951	Pan American Games	Buenos Aires, Argentina	2nd	4 × 400 m relay	3:17.7
1952	South American Championships	Buenos Aires, Argentina	1st	110 m hurdles	14.9
1952	South American Championships	Buenos Aires, Argentina	2nd	400 m hurdles	53.5
1952	South American Championships	Buenos Aires, Argentina	4th	4 × 100 m relay	42.5
1952	Olympic Games	Helsinki, Finland	20th (h)	110 m hurdles	15.44
1952	Olympic Games	Helsinki, Finland	29th (h)	400 m hurdles	56.1
1953	South American Championships (unofficial)	Santiago, Chile	4th	110 m hurdles	15.2
1953	South American Championships (unofficial)	Santiago, Chile	2nd	400 m hurdles	52.4
1953	South American Championships (unofficial)	Santiago, Chile	2nd	4 × 400 m relay	3:17.1
1959	South American Championships (unofficial)	São Paulo, Brazil	4th	110 m hurdles	15.3
1959	South American Championships (unofficial)	São Paulo, Brazil	5th	400 m hurdles	57.7

== Personal bests ==
- 110 metres hurdles – 14.9h (1952)
- 400 metres hurdles – 52.4h (1953)
