= Reinaldo Gorno =

Argentine long-distance runner

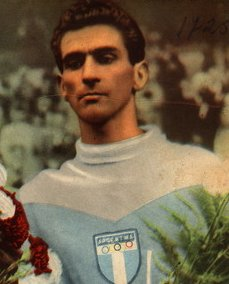
- Reinaldo Gorno in 1952

Personal information
- Full name: Reinaldo Berto Gorno
- Born: 18 July 1918 Yapeyú, Corrientes, Argentina
- Died: 10 April 1994 (aged 75) Buenos Aires, Argentina
- Height: 170 m (557 ft 9 in)
- Weight: 63 kg (139 lb)
Medal record
Men's athletics
Representing Argentina
Olympic Games
| Silver medal – second place | 1952 Helsinki | Marathon |
Pan American Games
| Silver medal – second place | 1951 Buenos Aires | Marathon |

Reinaldo Berto Gorno (July 18, 1918 in Yapeyú – April 10, 1994 in Buenos Aires) was a long-distance runner from Argentina, who, behind Emil Zátopek, won the silver medal at the 1952 Summer Olympics, held in Helsinki, Finland. In 1954 he became the first non-Japanese winner of the Asahi Marathon. He also won the silver medal at the 1951 Pan American Games. His personal best marathon time was 2:20:28 (1955).

== International competitions ==
| Year | Competition | Venue | Position | Event | Notes |
Representing Argentina
| 1941 | South American Championships | Buenos Aires, Argentina | 2nd | 5000 m | 15:12.1 |
| 1941 | South American Championships | Buenos Aires, Argentina | 2nd | 10,000 m | 31:39.6 |
| 1945 | South American Championships | Montevideo, Uruguay | 3rd | 5000 m | 15:24.2 |
| 1945 | South American Championships | Montevideo, Uruguay | 2nd | 10,000 m | 32:38.2 |
| 1946 | South American Championships (unofficial) | Santiago, Chile | 3rd | 5000 m | 15:21.6 |
| 1946 | South American Championships (unofficial) | Santiago, Chile | 1st | 20 km | 1:09:03 |
| 1947 | South American Championships | Rio de Janeiro, Brazil | 2nd | Cross country | 38:39.0 |
| 1949 | South American Championships | Lima, Peru | 4th | 12 km cross | 37:04 |
| 1951 | Pan American Games | Buenos Aires, Argentina | 2nd | Marathon | 2:45:00 |
| 1952 | South American Championships | Buenos Aires, Argentina | 2nd | 5000 m | 15:05.5 |
| 1952 | South American Championships | Buenos Aires, Argentina | 2nd | Half marathon | 1:11:28 |
| 1952 | Olympic Games | Helsinki, Finland | 2nd | Marathon | 2:25:35 |
| 1953 | South American Championships (unofficial) | Santiago, Chile | 1st | Half marathon | 1:09:47 |

== Personal bests ==
- Marathon – 2:24:55 (Kamakura 1954; also 2:20:28 on a short 41.4 km course; – Boston 1955)
