= Juan López (sprinter) =

Uruguayan sprinter (1926–1978)

Personal information
- Full name: Juan Jacinto López Testa
- Nationality: Uruguayan
- Born: 14 February 1926 Florida
- Died: 3 August 1978 (aged 52) Montevideo
- Height: 1.74 m (5 ft 9 in)
- Weight: 65 kg (143 lb)

Sport
- Sport: Sprinting
- Event: 100 metres

Juan Jacinto López Testa (14 February 1926 – 3 August 1978) was a Uruguayan sprinter. He competed in the men's 100 metres at the 1948 Summer Olympics.

== Competition record ==
Year	Competition	Venue	Position	Event	Notes
Representing Uruguay
1947	South American Championships	Rio de Janeiro, Brazil	– (h)	100 m	DQ
1947	South American Championships	Rio de Janeiro, Brazil	6th	200 m	NT
1947	South American Championships	Rio de Janeiro, Brazil	2nd	4 × 100 m relay	42.9
1948	Olympic Games	London, United Kingdom	11th (sf)	100 m	11.05
1948	Olympic Games	London, United Kingdom	1st (h)	200 m	22.1^{1}
1948	Olympic Games	London, United Kingdom	10th (h)	4 × 100 m relay	42.8
1949	South American Championships	Lima, Peru	4th	100 m	10.8
1949	South American Championships	Lima, Peru	5th	4 × 100 m relay	43.9

^{1}Did not start in the quarterfinals

== Personal bests ==
- 100 metres – 10.4h (1948)
- 200 metres – 21.9h (1948)
