= Lucila Pini =

Brazilian sprinter (1930–1975)

Personal information
- Full name: Lucilla Pini Baptista
- Nationality: Brazilian
- Born: 29 October 1930 São Paulo, Brazil
- Died: 1 March 1975 (aged 44)

Sport
- Sport: Sprinting
- Event: 200 metres

Lucilla Pini Baptista (29 October 1930 – 1 March 1975) was a Brazilian sprinter. She competed as part of Brazil's 4 x 100 metre relay team and in the women's 200 metres at the 1948 Summer Olympics. Pini died on 1 March 1975, at the age of 44.

== International competitions ==
Year	Competition	Venue	Position	Event	Notes
Representing Brazil
1947	South American Championships	Rio de Janeiro, Brazil	6th (h)	100 m	13.2^{1}
1947	South American Championships	Rio de Janeiro, Brazil	2nd	4 × 100 m relay	50.3
1948	Olympic Games	London, United Kingdom	3rd (h)	200 m	27.6
1948	Olympic Games	London, United Kingdom	8th (h)	4 × 100 m relay	49.0
1949	South American Championships	Lima, Peru	1st	4 × 100 m relay	49.2
1952	South American Championships	Buenos Aires, Argentina	2nd	4 × 100 m relay	48.8

^{1}Disqualified in the final

== Personal bests ==
- 100 metres – 13.2h (1947)
- 200 metres – 27.6h (1947)
