= Corsino Fernández =

Argentine athlete (1920–2011)

Personal information
- Full name: José Corsino Fernández Arquelles
- Born: 12 November 1920 Buenos Aires, Argentina
- Died: 6 June 2011 (aged 90)

Sport
- Sport: Long-distance running
- Event: Marathon

José Corsino Fernández Arquelles (12 November 1920 – 6 June 2011) was an Argentine long-distance runner. He competed in the marathon at the 1952 Summer Olympics.

== International competitions ==
Year	Competition	Venue	Position	Event	Notes
Representing Argentina
1943	South American Championships	Santiago, Chile	1st	32 km	1:45:45
1945	South American Championships	Montevideo, Uruguay	2nd	32 km	1:46:20
1946	South American Championships (unofficial)	Santiago, Chile	2nd	20 km	1:10:05
1952	South American Championships	Buenos Aires, Argentina	3rd	10,000 m	31:32.3
1952	South American Championships	Buenos Aires, Argentina	3rd	Half marathon	1:11:28
1952	Olympic Games	Helsinki, Finland	–	Marathon	DNF
