= Adriana Millard =

Chilean sprinter (born 1926)

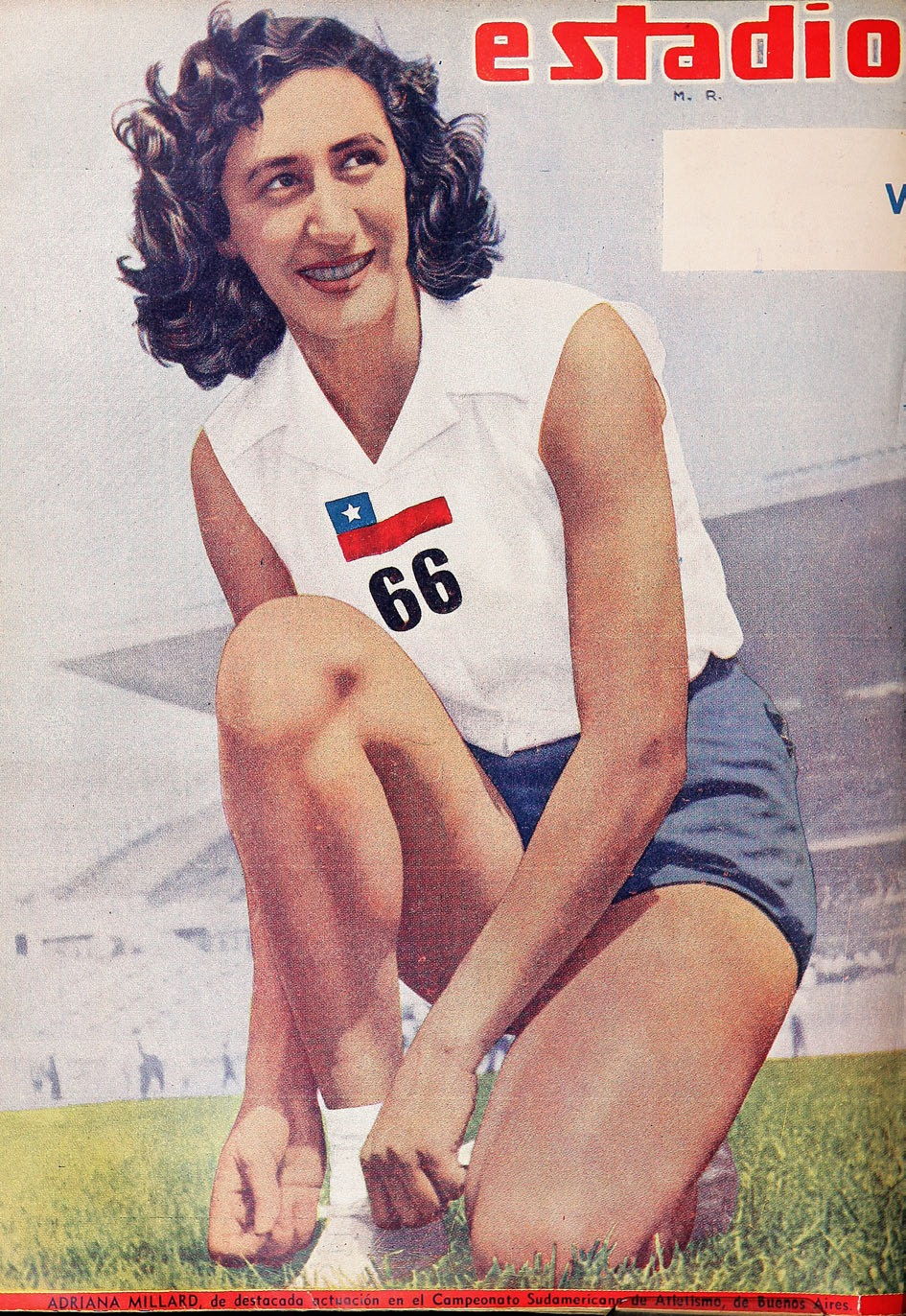

Personal information
- Full name: Adriana Millard Pacheco
- Born: 13 May 1926 (age 100) Santiago, Chile
- Height: 1.76 m (5 ft 9 in)
- Weight: 65 kg (143 lb)

Sport
- Sport: Sprinting
- Event: 200 metres

Adriana Millard Pacheco (Note: In this Spanish name, the first or paternal surname is Millard and the second or maternal family name is Pacheco.) (born 13 May 1926) is a Chilean sprinter. She competed in the women's 200 metres at the 1948 and 1952 Summer Olympics.

== International competitions ==
Year	Competition	Venue	Position	Event	Notes
Representing Chile
1947	South American Championships	Rio de Janeiro, Brazil	5th	100 m	13.0 s
1947	South American Championships	Rio de Janeiro, Brazil	3rd	200 m	27.1 s
1947	South American Championships	Rio de Janeiro, Brazil	3rd	4 × 100 m relay	50.5 s
1948	Olympic Games	London, United Kingdom	10th (h)	4 × 100 m relay	51.68 s
1949	South American Championships	Lima, Peru	2nd	100 m	12.8 s
1949	South American Championships	Lima, Peru	1st	200 m	25.8 s
1949	South American Championships	Lima, Peru	2nd	4 × 100 m relay	50.8 s
1949	South American Championships	Lima, Peru	2nd	Long jump	5.42 m
1950	South American Championships (unofficial)	Montevideo, Uruguay	2nd	100 m	12.6 s
1950	South American Championships (unofficial)	Montevideo, Uruguay	1st	200 m	26.2 s
1950	South American Championships (unofficial)	Montevideo, Uruguay	3rd	High jump	1.45 m
1950	South American Championships (unofficial)	Montevideo, Uruguay	1st	Long jump	5.35 m
1950	South American Championships (unofficial)	Montevideo, Uruguay	3rd	Javelin throw	?
1951	Pan American Games	Buenos Aires, Argentina	5th	100 m	12.8
1951	Pan American Games	Buenos Aires, Argentina	3rd	200 m	26.1
1951	Pan American Games	Buenos Aires, Argentina	2nd	4 × 100 m relay	49.3
1952	South American Championships	Buenos Aires, Argentina	2nd	100 m	12.4 s
1952	South American Championships	Buenos Aires, Argentina	2nd	200 m	25.5 s
1952	South American Championships	Buenos Aires, Argentina	3rd	80 m hurdles	12.2 s
1952	South American Championships	Buenos Aires, Argentina	3rd	4 × 100 m relay	49.1 s
1952	South American Championships	Buenos Aires, Argentina	8th	High jump	1.40 m
1952	South American Championships	Buenos Aires, Argentina	2nd	Long jump	5.39 m
1952	Olympic Games	Helsinki, Finland	18th (h)	200 m	25.58 s
1952	Olympic Games	Helsinki, Finland	13th	Long jump	5.59 m
1953	South American Championships (unofficial)	Santiago, Chile	4th	100 m	12.8
1953	South American Championships (unofficial)	Santiago, Chile	3rd	4 × 100 m relay	50.3
1953	South American Championships (unofficial)	Santiago, Chile	–	Long jump	NM
1954	South American Championships	São Paulo, Brazil	6th	High jump	1.40 m
1954	South American Championships	São Paulo, Brazil	5th	Long jump	5.28 m

== Personal bests ==
- 100 metres – 12.2h (1952)
- 200 metres – 25.58 (1952)
- Long jump – 5.59 metres (1952)
