= Mario Recordón =

Chilean architect and athlete (1922–1994)

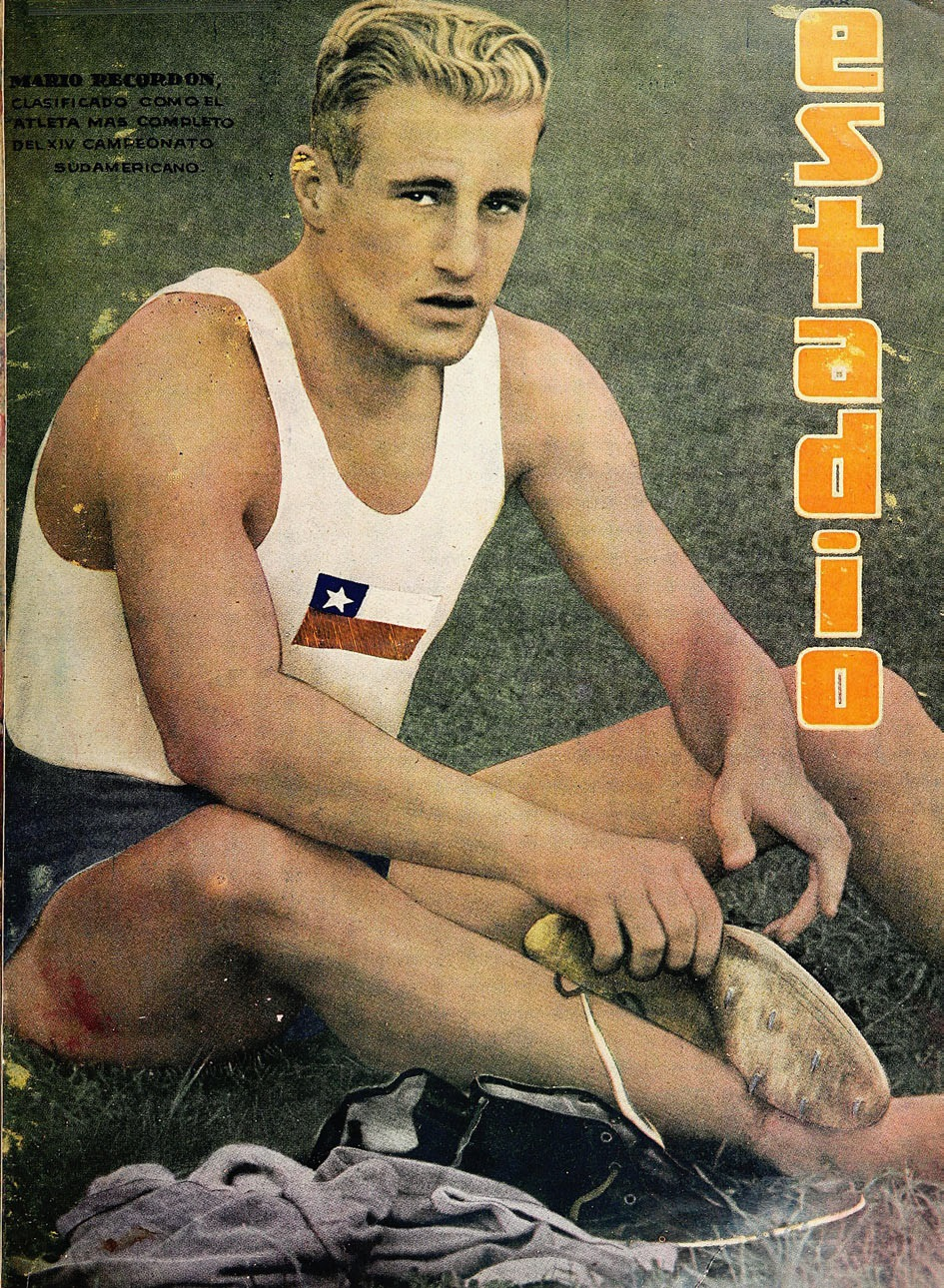
- Born: Mario Eduardo Recordón Burnier; 14 July 1922; Osorno, Chile
- Died: 5 June 1994 (aged 71); Colico Lake, Chile
- Other name: The Tiger of Osorno
- Education: University of Chile
- Occupations: Architect, athlete and educator

Mario Eduardo Recordón Burnier (14 July 1922 – 5 June 1994), known as the Tiger of Osorno, was a Chilean architect, athlete and educator. He led Chile to victory in the decathlon in the 1946 South American Athletics Championships and competed in the men's 110 metres hurdles at the 1948 Summer Olympics.

== Early life and education ==
He was the son of Swiss immigrants Julio Recordon Borel and Rosa Burnie Bruchez. He studied at the Osorno Lyceum and the National Boarding School at Barros Arana. Relocating to Santiago in 1939, he studied in the Faculty of Architecture and Urbanism at the University of Chile, receiving a degree in architecture in 1946.

== Athletic career ==
A self-taught athlete, he first competed in 1942, after reading in a newspaper about the possibility of competing in an interfaculty tournament at Los Leones stadium. His first major competition was a university tournament in which he came in first place in the shot put event.

In 1945, he placed in the XIV South American Athletic Championships in Montevideo. Competing for the first time in the decathlon, he won, surprising all the participants not only with his victory but with his physical appearance, tall and blonde, a contrast to the rest of the Chilean delegation.

In the 1946 South American Championships, which took place in Chile, he set records in the 110 meter hurdles and the 1500 meters. He also took part in the decathlon, and on the first day came in first in four of the five events and second in the other. On the second day, however, it turned out that he had pulled a muscle, an injury that prevented him from breaking the world record of 7,000 points, but he came close with 6,886 points. This represented an improvement of 500 points over his performance in the same combined event in Montevideo. His achievement at the 1946 championships brought Chile the gold, consigning Argentina and Brazil to second and third place, respectively.

He took part in the Olympic Games in London in 1948, although little by little his performance declined, until a strong bout of typhus obliged him to bow out of the final competition. Competing later at the local level, he combined this activity with his career as an architect.

=== Athletic honors ===
Year	Competition	Venue	Position	Event	Notes
Representing Chile
1945	South American Championships	Montevideo, Uruguay	4th (h)	110 m hurdles	NT
1945	South American Championships	Montevideo, Uruguay	1st	Decathlon	6338 pts
1946	South American Championships (unofficial)	Santiago, Chile	1st	110 m hurdles	14.4 s
1946	South American Championships (unofficial)	Santiago, Chile	1st	Decathlon	6886 pts
1947	South American Championships	Rio de Janeiro, Brazil	4th	110 m hurdles	15.4 s
1947	South American Championships	Rio de Janeiro, Brazil	–	Decathlon	DNF
1948	Olympic Games	London, United Kingdom	13th (h)	110 m hurdles	15.3 s
1948	Olympic Games	London, United Kingdom	4th	Decathlon	5730 pts
1949	South American Championships	Lima, Peru	4th	110 m hurdles	15.3 s
1950	South American Championships (unofficial)	Montevideo, Uruguay	2nd	110 m hurdles	15.3 s
1950	South American Championships (unofficial)	Montevideo, Uruguay	4th	Shot put	12.80 m

- South American record-holder in the 110-metre hurdle and decathlon.

== Architectural career ==
From the time he received his degree in 1946, he pursued his career as an architect while continuing to participate in sports. In 1955 he was named professor of Architectural Composition at the University of Chile. In 1964 he was given the Chair of Architectural Design at the same institution.

Between 1988 and 1990 he was Dean of the Faculty of Architecture and Urbanism at the University of Chile.

=== Professional honors ===
In 1987 he was awarded the National Prize in Architecture.

== Death ==
He died of a heart attack at Lake Colico on June 5, 1994.

== Personal life ==
In 1952 he married Marianne Martin Guilleux, with whom he had three children: Felipe, Catalina, and Nicolás.

== Architectural accomplishments ==
- Estadio Cubierto Metropolitano (actual Movistar Arena)
- Estadio Monumental
- Estadio Regional de Antofagasta
- Hipódromo de Antofagasta
- Estadio El Cobre
- Cine de Coronel
- Estadio Israelita
- Casino de Puerto Varas
- Estadio Municipal de Concepción
- Estadio de Valdivia
- Gimnasio Municipal de Valdivia

== Recognition ==
- The running track at the National Stadium bears his name.
- The Olympic Village at Osorno is also named for him..
- The University of Chile established the Marío Recordón Medal, which is awarded in recognition of academic achievement.
- The Mario Recordón Athletic Competition is organized by the Universitarios Azules in Santiago.
- The Mario Recordón Student Athletic Competition is an annual event in Osorno.
