= Romeo Galán =

Argentine sprinter

Personal information
- Full name: Romeo Alberto Galán
- Nationality: Argentine
- Born: 7 June 1933 (age 93)

Sport
- Sport: Sprinting
- Event: 100 metres

Romeo Alberto Galán (born 7 June 1933) is an Argentine sprinter. He competed in the men's 100 metres at the 1952 Summer Olympics.

== Competition record ==
Year	Competition	Venue	Position	Event	Notes
Representing Argentina
1952	South American Championships	Buenos Aires, Argentina	6th (sf)	100 m	10.9
1952	South American Championships	Buenos Aires, Argentina	1st	4 × 100 m relay	41.4
1952	Olympic Gamess	Helsinki, Finland	20th (qf)	100 m	11.08/10.9
1952	Olympic Gamess	Helsinki, Finland	7th (sf)	4 × 100 m relay	41.61
1953	South American Championships (unofficial)	Santiago, Chile	2nd	100 m	11.00.9
1953	South American Championships (unofficial)	Santiago, Chile	2nd	4 × 100 m relay	41.9
1953	International University Sports Week	Dortmund, West Germany	1st	100 m	10.7 (w)
1953	International University Sports Week	Dortmund, West Germany	1st	4 × 100 m relay	42.2

== Personal bests ==
- 100 metres – 10.5h w (1951)
