= Athletics at the 1955 Pan American Games – Men's hammer throw =

Men's hammer throw at the Pan American Games

The men's hammer throw event at the 1955 Pan American Games was held at the Estadio Universitario in Mexico City on 16 March.

== Results ==
Rank	Name	Nationality	Result	Notes
1st place, gold medalist(s)	Bob Backus	United States	54.91	GR
2nd place, silver medalist(s)	Marty Engel	United States	53.36	
3rd place, bronze medalist(s)	Elvio Porta	Argentina	51.45	
4	Alejandro Díaz	Chile	50.56	
5	Arturo Melcher	Chile	49.60	
6	Walter Kupper	Brazil	49.35	
7	Francisco Fragoso	Mexico	45.96	
8	Enrique Isturiz	Venezuela	43.73	
9	Daniel Alvarado	Venezuela	43.71	
10	Luis Betancourt	Cuba	42.49	
11	Enrique Lagoyete	Colombia	40.40	
12	Alejandro Rueda	Mexico	40.17	
	Mauricio Rodríguez	Venezuela	NM	
	John Pavelich	Canada	DNS	
