= Alberto Labarthe =

Chilean sprinter (1928–2021)

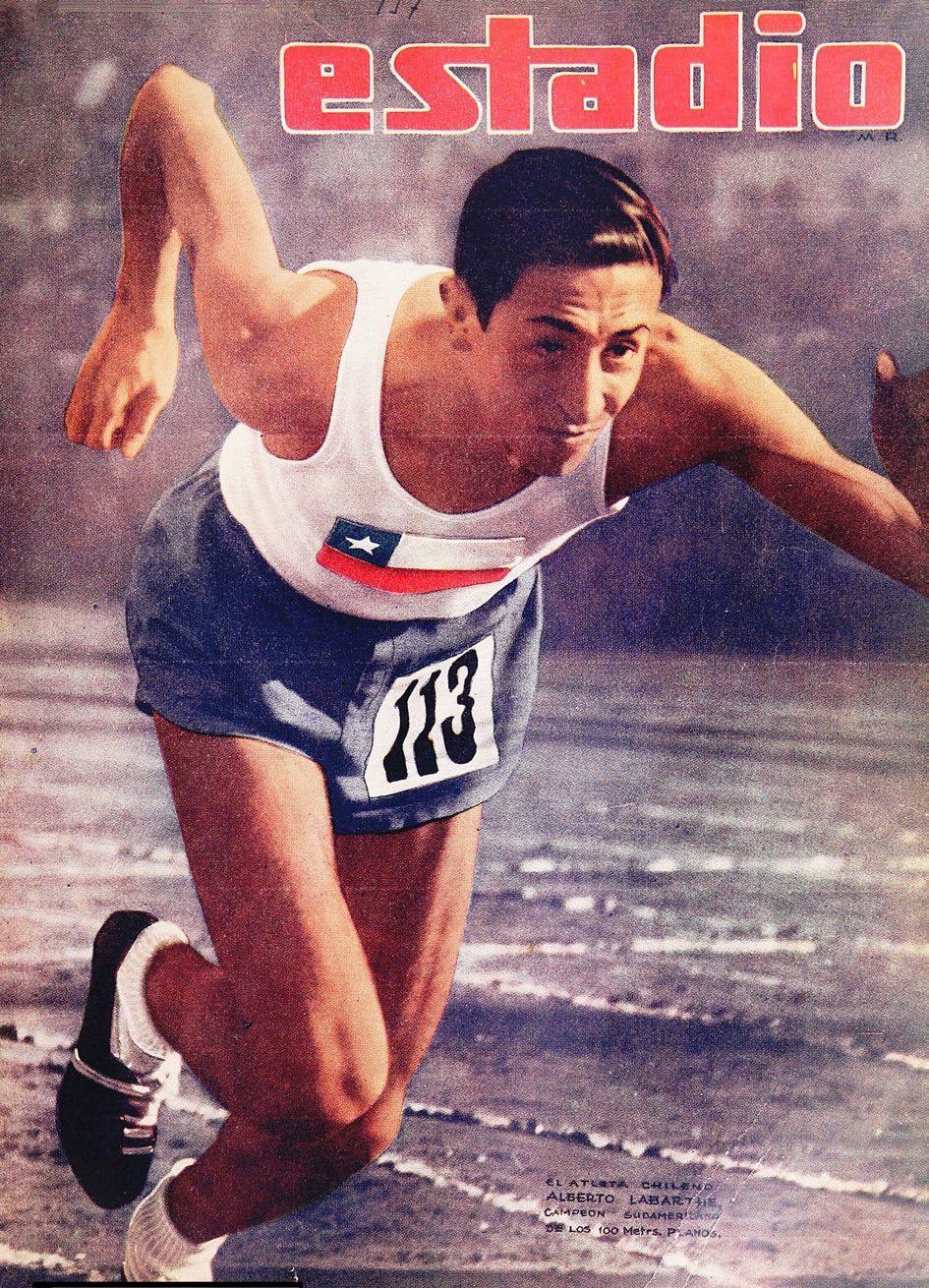

Personal information
- Full name: Alberto Dionisio Labarthe Celery
- Born: 31 March 1928 Santiago, Chile
- Died: 18 November 2021 (aged 93) Algarrobo, Chile
- Height: 1.68 m (5 ft 6 in)
- Weight: 58 kg (128 lb)

Sport
- Sport: Sprinting
- Event: 100 metres

Alberto Dionisio Labarthe Celery (31 March 1928 – 18 November 2021) was a Chilean sprinter. He competed in the men's 100 metres at the 1948 Summer Olympics. Labarthe died in November 2021, at the age of 93.

== Competition record ==
Year	Competition	Venue	Position	Event	Notes
Representing Chile
1946	South American Championships (unofficial)	Santiago, Chile	1st	100 m	10.8
1946	South American Championships (unofficial)	Santiago, Chile	2nd	200 m	22.0
1947	South American Championships	Rio de Janeiro, Brazil	3rd (h)	100 m	11.1
1947	South American Championships	Rio de Janeiro, Brazil	3rd	200 m	22.4
1947	South American Championships	Rio de Janeiro, Brazil	4th	4 × 100 m relay	44.0
1948	Olympic Games	London, United Kingdom	37th (h)	100 m	11.16 (w)
1949	South American Championships	Lima, Peru	6th (h)	100 m	11.0
1949	South American Championships	Lima, Peru	6th (h)	200 m	22.5
1949	South American Championships	Lima, Peru	3rd	4 × 100 m relay	42.5

== Personal bests ==
- 100 metres – 10.5h (1946)
