= 1947 South American Championships in Athletics – Results =

These are the results of the 1947 South American Championships in Athletics which took place at the Estádio de Laranjeiras in Rio de Janeiro, Brazil, between 26 and 4 May.

== Men's results ==
=== 100 metres ===
Heats – 26 April

| Rank | Heat | Name | Nationality | Time | Notes |
|---|---|---|---|---|---|
| 1 | 1 | Adelio Márquez | Argentina | 11.2 | Q |
| 2 | 1 | Miguel León Pizarro | Peru | 11.2 | Q |
| 3 | 1 | Guilherme Puschnick | Brazil | 11.5 | |
| 4 | 1 | Fernando Musa | Chile | 11.5 | |
| | 1 | Juan López Testa | Chile | DQ | |
| 1 | 2 | Gerardo Bönnhoff | Argentina | 10.9 | Q |
| 2 | 2 | Santiago Ferrando | Peru | 11.0 | Q |
| 3 | 2 | Alberto Labarthe | Chile | 11.1 | |
| 4 | 2 | Walter Pérez | Uruguay | 11.1 | |
| 5 | 2 | Creso de Araújo | Brazil | NT | |
| 1 | 3 | Carlos Isaack | Argentina | 11.1 | Q |
| 2 | 3 | Osmar Bruno | Brazil | 11.3 | Q |
| 3 | 3 | Alberto Mayer | Peru | 11.4 | |
| 4 | 3 | Carlos Silva | Chile | 11.5 | |
| | 1 | Mario Fayos | Uruguay | DQ | |

Final – 27 April

| Rank | Lane | Name | Nationality | Time | Notes |
|---|---|---|---|---|---|
| 1st place, gold medalist(s) | 2 | Gerardo Bönnhoff | Argentina | 11.0 | |
| 2nd place, silver medalist(s) | 6 | Santiago Ferrando | Peru | 11.2 | |
| 3rd place, bronze medalist(s) | 1 | Carlos Isaack | Argentina | 11.3 | |
| 4 | 3 | Adelio Márquez | Argentina | 11.5 | |
| 5 | 4 | Miguel León Pizarro | Peru | NT | |
| 6 | 5 | Osmar Bruno | Brazil | NT | |

=== 200 metres ===
Heats – 29 April

| Rank | Heat | Name | Nationality | Time | Notes |
|---|---|---|---|---|---|
| 1 | 1 | Alberto Labarthe | Chile | 22.5 | Q |
| 2 | 1 | Alberto Triulzi | Argentina | 22.6 | Q |
| 3 | 1 | Walter Pérez | Uruguay | 22.7 | |
| 4 | 1 | Emilo Schenk | Brazil | 23.0 | |
| 5 | 1 | Miguel León Pizarro | Peru | NT | |
| 1 | 2 | Gerardo Bönnhoff | Argentina | 22.2 | Q |
| 2 | 2 | Mario Fayos | Uruguay | 22.6 | Q |
| 3 | 2 | Alberto Mayer | Peru | 22.8 | |
| 4 | 2 | Geraldo da Luz | Brazil | 23.2 | |
| 5 | 2 | Fernando Musa | Chile | NT | |
| 1 | 3 | Santiago Ferrando | Peru | 22.4 | Q |
| 2 | 3 | Juan López Testa | Uruguay | 22.4 | Q |
| 3 | 3 | João Abreu | Brazil | 22.5 | |
| 4 | 3 | Jaime Itlman | Chile | 22.6 | |
| 5 | 3 | Adelio Márquez | Argentina | NT | |

Final – 1 May

| Rank | Name | Nationality | Time | Notes |
|---|---|---|---|---|
| 1st place, gold medalist(s) | Alberto Triulzi | Argentina | 22.0 | |
| 2nd place, silver medalist(s) | Gerardo Bönnhoff | Argentina | 22.3 | |
| 3rd place, bronze medalist(s) | Alberto Labarthe | Chile | 22.4 | |
| 4 | Santiago Ferrando | Peru | 22.5 | |
| 5 | Mario Fayos | Uruguay | NT | |
| 6 | Juan López Testa | Uruguay | NT | |

=== 110 metres hurdles ===
Heats – 26 April

| Rank | Heat | Name | Nationality | Time | Notes |
|---|---|---|---|---|---|
| 1 | 1 | Jorge Undurraga | Chile | 15.2 | Q |
| 2 | 1 | Gastão Mesquita Neto | Brazil | 15.6 | Q |
| 3 | 1 | Erni Markus | Brazil | 16.0 | Q |
| 4 | 1 | Ricardo Scipione | Argentina | NT | |
| 5 | 1 | Rodolfo Benítez | Argentina | NT | |
| 1 | 2 | Alberto Triulzi | Argentina | 15.0 | Q |
| 2 | 2 | Hélio Pereira | Brazil | 15.2 | Q |
| 3 | 2 | Mario Recordón | Chile | 15.6 | Q |
| 4 | 2 | Manuel Aldunate | Chile | 15.6 | |

Final – 27 April

| Rank | Name | Nationality | Time | Notes |
|---|---|---|---|---|
| 1st place, gold medalist(s) | Alberto Triulzi | Argentina | 14.7 | |
| 2nd place, silver medalist(s) | Hélio Pereira | Brazil | 15.3 | |
| 3rd place, bronze medalist(s) | Jorge Undurraga | Chile | 15.4 | |
| 4 | Mario Recordón | Chile | 15.4 | |
| 5 | Gastão Mesquita Neto | Brazil | NT | |
| 6 | Erni Markus | Brazil | NT | |

=== 4 × 100 metres relay ===
17 April

| Rank | Nation | Competitors | Time | Notes |
|---|---|---|---|---|
| 1st place, gold medalist(s) | Argentina | Carlos Isaack, Alberto Triulzi, Gerardo Bönnhoff, Adelio Márquez | 42.3 | |
| 2nd place, silver medalist(s) | Uruguay | Walter Pérez, Mario Fayos, Lorenzo Giordano, Juan López Testa | 42.9 | |
| 3rd place, bronze medalist(s) | Brazil | Rui Lima, Osmar Bruno, Geraldo da Luz, Guilherme Puschnik | 43.5 | |
| 4 | Chile | Alberto Labarthe, Fernando Musa, Raúl Dasori, Carlos Silva | 44.0 | |
| 5 | Peru | Alberto Mayer, Conrado Pérez, Miguel León Pizarro, Santiago Ferrando | NT | |

== Women's results ==
=== 100 metres ===
Heats – 26 April

| Rank | Heat | Name | Nationality | Time | Notes |
|---|---|---|---|---|---|
| 1 | 1 | Noemí Simonetto | Argentina | 12.7 | Q |
| 2 | 1 | Melânia Luz | Brazil | 12.9 | Q |
| 3 | 1 | Adriana Millard | Chile | 13.1 | Q |
| 1 | 2 | Annegret Weller | Chile | 12.7 | Q |
| 2 | 2 | Alicia Gómez | Argentina | 12.9 | Q |
| 3 | 2 | Lucila Pini | Brazil | 13.2 | Q |
| 4 | 2 | Edelma Camporino | Argentina | NT | |

Final – 27 April

| Rank | Name | Nationality | Time | Notes |
|---|---|---|---|---|
| 1st place, gold medalist(s) | Noemí Simonetto | Argentina | 12.4 | |
| 2nd place, silver medalist(s) | Annegret Weller | Chile | 12.7 | |
| 3rd place, bronze medalist(s) | Melânia Luz | Brazil | 12.8 | |
| 4 | Alicia Gómez | Argentina | 12.8 | |
| 5 | Adriana Millard | Chile | 13.0 | |
| | Lucila Pini | Brazil | DQ | |
