= 1945 South American Championships in Athletics =

- Dates: 15–22 April
- Host city: Montevideo, Uruguay

The 1945 South American Championships in Athletics were held in the Uruguayan capital, Montevideo, between 15 and 22 April.

== Medal summary ==
=== Men's events ===
| Event | Gold | | Silver | | Bronze | |
|---|---|---|---|---|---|---|
| 100 metres | José de Assis; Brazil | 10.5 CR | Walter Pérez; Uruguay | 10.7 | Adelio Márquez; Argentina | 10.7 |
| 200 metres | José de Assis; Brazil | 21.3 CR | Adelio Márquez; Argentina | 21.4 | Rodolfo Carrera; Argentina | 22.4 |
| 400 metres | Jorge Ehlers; Chile | 49.0 | Agenor da Silva; Brazil | 49.2 | Rosalvo Ramos; Brazil | 49.4 |
| 800 metres | Agenor da Silva; Brazil | 1:55.3 | Nilo Riveros; Argentina | 1:55.8 | Alfonso Rozas; Chile | 1:56.5 |
| 1500 metres | Roberto Yokota; Chile | 4:05.2 | Alfonso Rozas; Chile | 4:05.9 | Guillermo García; Chile | 4:07.0 |
| 3000 metres | Raúl Ibarra; Argentina | 8:39.4 | Raúl Inostroza; Chile | 8:41.8 | Delfo Cabrera; Argentina | 8:48.8 |
| 5000 metres | Raúl Ibarra; Argentina | 15:00.4 | Raúl Inostroza; Chile | 15:04.6 | Reinaldo Gorno; Argentina | 15:24.2 |
| 10,000 metres | Raúl Ibarra; Argentina | 31:52.6 | Reinaldo Gorno; Argentina | 32:38.2 | Oscar Ibarra; Argentina | 32:48.6 |
| 32 km road race | Corsino Fernández; Argentina | 1:46:20 | Julio Montecinos; Chile | 1:50:48 | José Berger; Brazil | 1:54:12 |
| 110 metres hurdles | Julio Ramírez; Uruguay | 14.7 CR | Julio Jaime; Uruguay | 14.9 | Hélio Pereira; Brazil | 15.0 |
| 400 metres hurdles | José López; Argentina | 55.3 | Sylvio Padilha; Brazil | 55.3 | Hércules Azcune; Uruguay | 56.3 |
| 4 × 100 metres relay | Brazil; Edgar dos Santos; José de Assis; Geraldo da Luz; Renato Bastianon | 41.9 CR | Argentina; Hector Ravano; Lucio Florio; Adelio Marquez; Carlos Isaack | 42.0 | Uruguay; Walter Pérez; José Cuneo; Julio Jaime; Domingo Borallo | 43.3 |
| 4 × 400 metres relay | Brazil; Rosalvo Ramos; Sobrinho; Agenor da Silva; José de Assis | 3:16.5 CR | Argentina; Adelio Marquez; Agustín Martín; Leopoldo Monastirsky; Antonio Pocovi | 3:20.0 | Uruguay; Leal; Raimundo; Carne; Nelson García | 3:28.7 |
| 3000 metres team race | Argentina | 11 | Brazil | 15 | Chile | 24 |
| Cross country | Reinaldo Gorno; Argentina | 44:12.4 | Joaquim da Silva; Brazil | 44:14.6 | Raúl Ibarra; Argentina | 44:29.4 |
| High jump | Hércules Azcune; Uruguay | 1.90 | Celso Dória; Brazil | 1.85 | Pedro Listur; Uruguay | 1.85 |
| Pole vault | Icaro Mello; Brazil | 3.90 | Raimundo Rodrigues; Brazil | 3.90 | Federico Horn; Chile | 3.80 |
| Long jump | José de Assis; Brazil | 7.09 | Alfredo Meynet; Chile | 6.89 | Alberto Eggeling; Chile | 6.78 |
| Triple jump | Geraldo de Oliveira; Brazil | 14.43 | Celestino Sarraua; Argentina | 14.17 | Néstor Tenorio; Argentina | 14.16 |
| Shot put | Emilio Malchiodi; Argentina | 14.69 CR | Ricardo Nitz; Brazil | 14.39 | Julián Llorente; Argentina | 14.21 |
| Discus throw | Emilio Malchiodi; Argentina | 44.27 | Celso Dória; Brazil | 43.85 | Bento Barros; Brazil | 42.77 |
| Hammer throw | Juan Fusé; Argentina | 48.33 | Dário Tavares; Brazil | 48.18 | Bento Barros; Brazil | 47.12 |
| Javelin throw | Raúl Cóccaro; Uruguay | 57.08 | Efraín Santibáñez; Chile | 56.05 | Rodolfo Correa; Chile | 55.26 |
| Decathlon | Mario Recordón; Chile | 6338 | Celso Dória; Brazil | 6217 | Raimundo Rodrigues; Brazil | 6060 |

=== Women's events ===
| Event | Gold | | Silver | | Bronze | |
|---|---|---|---|---|---|---|
| 100 metres | Beatriz Kretschmer; Chile | 12.4 =CR | Noemí Simonetto; Argentina | 12.5 | Oldemia Bargiela; Argentina | 12.8 |
| 200 metres | Elizabeth Müller; Brazil | 26.4 | Oldemia Bargiela; Argentina | 27.1 | Beatriz Kretschmer; Chile | 27.1 |
| 80 metres hurdles | Noemí Simonetto; Argentina | 11.7 CR | Stella Ardinghi; Brazil | 12.0 | Erica Renner; Brazil | 12.4 |
| 4 × 100 metres relay | Argentina; Oldemia Bargiela; Camila Gómez; Elsa Irigoyen; Noemi Simonetto | 50.2 | Chile; Ines Kriwizan; Annegret Weller; Betty Morales; Betty Kretschmer | 51.1 | Brazil; Erica Renner; Stella Ardinghi; Lisete Regina; Elizabeth Müller | 51.2 |
| High jump | Ilse Barends; Chile | 1.58 CR | Noemí Simonetto; Argentina | 1.50 | Elizabeth Müller; Brazil | 1.50 |
| Long jump | Noemí Simonetto; Argentina | 5.44 CR | Elizabeth Müller; Brazil | 5.32 | Lucy Lake; Chile | 5.03 |
| Shot put | Elizabeth Müller; Brazil | 11.79 | Edith Klempau; Chile | 11.75 | Lore Zippelius; Chile | 11.41 |
| Discus throw | Ivete Mariz; Brazil | 37.40 CR | Lore Zippelius; Chile | 37.28 | Christel Balde; Chile | 36.98 |
| Javelin throw | Ursula Holle; Chile | 38.24 CR | Gerda Martín; Chile | 36.25 | Edith Klempau; Chile | 34.42 |

== Medal table ==
| Rank | Nation | Gold | Silver | Bronze | Total |
|---|---|---|---|---|---|
| 1 | Argentina (ARG) | 13 | 9 | 9 | 31 |
| 2 | Brazil (BRA) | 11 | 12 | 9 | 32 |
| 3 | Chile (CHI) | 6 | 10 | 11 | 27 |
| 4 | Uruguay (URU) | 3 | 2 | 4 | 9 |
| Totals (4 entries) | | 33 | 33 | 33 | 99 |
