= Elvio Porta (athlete) =

Argentinian athletics competitor

Personal information
- Full name: Elvio David Porta
- Born: December 15, 1921
- Died: Unknown

Sport
- Sport: Athletics
- Events: Hammer throw, discus throw

Elvio David Porta (born 15 December 1921 – date of death unknown) was an Argentine athlete who competed in the hammer and discus thrower.

He won multiple medals at regional level including two bronzes at the 1951 and 1955 Pan American Games.

== International competitions ==
Year	Competition	Venue	Position	Event	Notes
Representing Argentina
1951	Pan American Games	Mexico City, Mexico	3rd	Discus throw	44.93 m
1952	South American Championships	Buenos Aires, Argentina	2nd	Discus throw	45.27 m
1952	South American Championships	Buenos Aires, Argentina	2nd	Hammer throw	49.73 m
1953	South American Championships (unofficial)	Santiago, Chile	2nd	Discus throw	46.68 m
1953	South American Championships (unofficial)	Santiago, Chile	2nd	Hammer throw	48.75 m
1955	Pan American Games	Mexico City, Mexico	3rd	Hammer throw	51.45 m
1956	South American Championships	Santiago, Chile	5th	Discus throw	44.17 m
1956	South American Championships	Santiago, Chile	3rd	Hammer throw	51.55 m

== Personal bests ==
- Discus throw – 47.75 (Buenos Aires 1953)
- Hammer throw – 53.12 (Buenos Aires 1955)
