= Carlos Isaack =

Argentine sprinter

Carlos Isaac
Personal information
- Born: June 9, 1924 Gualeguaychú, Argentina
- Died: September 3, 2000 (aged 76) Rosario, Argentina
- Height: 1.78 m (5 ft 10 in)
- Weight: 62 kg (137 lb)

Sport
- Sport: Sprint (running)
- Events: 100 metres, 200 metres
- Club: Universitario de Rosario

Carlos Isaac (9 June 1924 – 3 September 2000) was an Argentine sprinter. He represented Argentina at the 1948 Summer Olympics in London. Isaac was born in Gualeguaychu, Argentina on 9 June 1924. He was entered in the 100 m and the 4x100 m relay, but did not advance past the heats in either. His personal best for 100m was 10.5 seconds, set in 1943. Issac died in Rosario, Argentina on 3 September 2000, at the age of 76.

== International competitions ==
Year	Competition	Venue	Position	Event	Notes
Representing Argentina
1945	South American Championships	Montevideo, Uruguay	4th	100 m	10.8
1945	South American Championships	Montevideo, Uruguay	2nd	4 × 100 m relay	42.0
1947	South American Championships	Rio de Janeiro, Brazil	3rd	100 m	11.3
1947	South American Championships	Rio de Janeiro, Brazil	1st	4 × 100 m relay	42.3
1948	Olympic Games	London, United Kingdom	44th (h)	100 m	11.24
1948	Olympic Games	London, United Kingdom	8th (h)	4 × 100 m relay	42.4
1953	South American Championships (unofficial)	Santiago, Chile	2nd	4 × 100 m relay	41.9

== Personal bests ==
- 100 metres – 10.5h (Buenos Aires 1943)
