= Carlos Silva (sprinter) =

Chilean sprinter

Personal information
- Nationality: Chilean
- Born: 16 August 1926 Santiago, Chile
- Died: 3 August 2010 (aged 83) Viña del Mar, Chile
- Height: 1.73 m (5 ft 8 in)
- Weight: 60 kg (132 lb)

Sport
- Sport: Sprinting
- Event: 100 metres

Carlos Silva Anguita (16 August 1926 – 3 August 2010) was a Chilean sprinter. He competed in the men's 100 metres at the 1948 Summer Olympics.

== International competitions ==
Year	Competition	Venue	Position	Event	Notes
Representing Chile
1946	South American Championships (unofficial)	Santiago, Chile	3rd	100 m	10.8
1947	South American Championships	Rio de Janeiro, Brazil	10th (h)	100 m	11.5
1947	South American Championships	Rio de Janeiro, Brazil	4th	4 × 100 m relay	44.0
1948	Olympic Games	London, United Kingdom	25th (h)	100 m	11.08
1948	Olympic Games	London, United Kingdom	11th (h)	4 × 400 m relay	3:23.8
1949	South American Championships	Lima, Peru	12th (h)	100 m	11.2
1949	South American Championships	Lima, Peru	3rd	4 × 100 m relay	42.5
1949	South American Championships (unofficial)	Montevideo, Uruguay	5th	100 m	NT

|}

== Personal bests ==
- 100 metres – 10.6h (1948)
