= Hélcio da Silva =

Brazilian pole vaulter (1928–2022)

Helcio da Silva
Personal information
- Full name: Helcio Buck Silva
- Nationality: Brazilian
- Born: 28 June 1928 Curitiba, Brazil
- Died: 31 October 2022 (aged 94) Curitiba, Brazil

Sport
- Sport: Athletics
- Event: Pole vault
- Club: Vasco da Gama

Helcio Buck Silva (28 June 1928 – 31 October 2022) was a Brazilian athlete. He competed in the men's pole vault at the 1952 Summer Olympics.

His personal best in the event was 4.01 metres set in 1951.

Da Silva died in Curitiba on 31 October 2022, at the age of 94.

== International competitions ==
| Year | Competition | Venue | Position | Notes |
Representing Brazil
| 1952 | South American Championships | Buenos Aires, Argentina | 1st | 4.00 m |
| 1952 | Olympic Games | Helsinki, Finland | 25th (q) | 3.60 m |
| 1953 | South American Championships (unofficial) | Santiago, Chile | 2nd | 3.80 m |
| 1953 | International University Sports Week | Dortmund, West Germany | 3rd | 4.00 m |
| 1954 | South American Championships | São Paulo, Brazil | 4th | 3.80 m |
