= Alberto Triulzi =

Argentine hurdler and sprinter

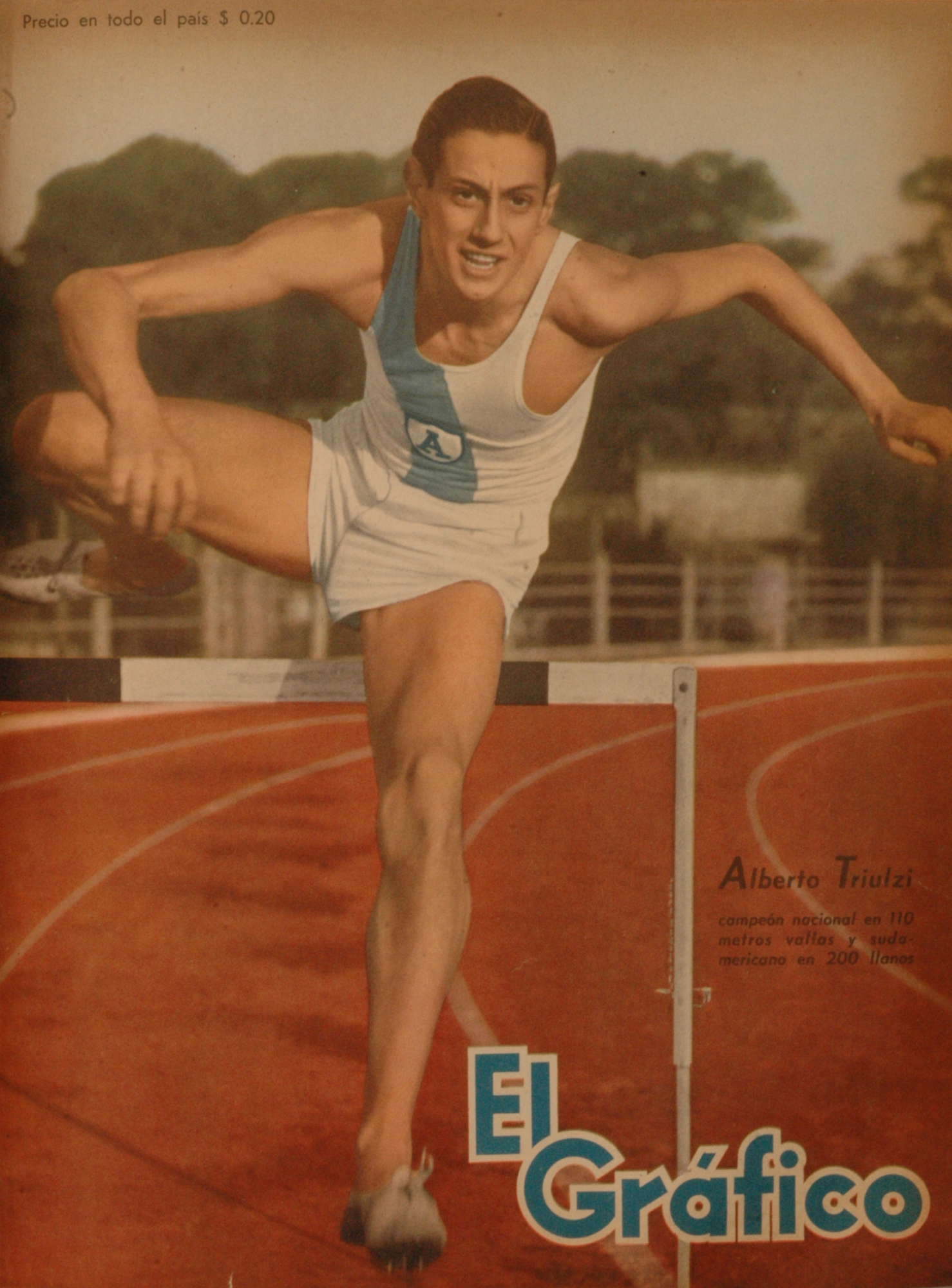

Personal information
- Full name: Alberto Ubaldo Triulzi Orozco
- Born: 6 January 1928 Buenos Aires, Argentina
- Died: 25 September 1968 (aged 40)
- Height: 1.91 m (6 ft 3 in)
- Weight: 72 kg (159 lb)
Medal record
Representing Argentina
South American Championships
Gold medal – first place	1947 Rio de Janeiro	200 m
Gold medal – first place	1947 Rio de Janeiro	110 m hurdles
Gold medal – first place	1949 Lima	110 m hurdles
Bronze medal – third place	1949 Lima	200 m

Alberto Ubaldo Triulzi Orozco (Note: In this Spanish name, the first or paternal surname is Triulzi and the second or maternal family name is Orozco.) (6 January 1928 – 9 September 1968) was an Argentine track and field athlete who specialised in hurdling and sprinting events. He competed in the 1948 Summer Olympics in the 110 m hurdles, where he finished fourth.| Wife Carmen Mora de Triulzi | Children Alberto Victonico Triulzi Mora, Carmen Elena Triulzi Mora, Bettina Triulzi Mora

Born in Buenos Aires, he was a three-time continental champion at the South American Championships in Athletics, winning a 200 metres/110 metres hurdles double in 1947 before taking a gold and bronze at the 1949 event. He broke the world junior record for the 110 m hurdles in his early career.

He was ranked eighth in a 1999 Confederación Argentina de Atletismo poll for the male Argentine athlete of the century.

== International competitions ==
Year	Competition	Venue	Position	Event	Notes
Representing Argentina
1946	South American Championships (unofficial)	Santiago, Chile	1st	200 m	21.9
1946	South American Championships (unofficial)	Santiago, Chile	2nd	110 m hurdles	14.6
1947	South American Championships	Rio de Janeiro, Brazil	1st	200 m	22.0
1947	South American Championships	Rio de Janeiro, Brazil	1st	110 m hurdles	14.7
1947	South American Championships	Rio de Janeiro, Brazil	1st	4 × 100 m relay	42.3
1948	Olympic Games	London, United Kingdom	4th	110 m hurdles	14.71
1949	South American Championships	Lima, Peru	3rd	200 m	22.5
1949	South American Championships	Lima, Peru	1st	110 m hurdles	14.5

== Personal bests ==
- 100 metres – 10.6h (Buenos Aires 1949)
- 110 metres hurdles – 14.0h (Buenos Aires 1947)
- 200 metres hurdles – 24.3h (Buenos Aires 1949)
