= 1950 South American Championships in Athletics (unofficial) – Results =

These are the results of the unofficial 1950 South American Championships in Athletics which took place at the Pista del Parque Batlle y Ordoñez in Montevideo, Uruguay, between 11 and 20 February.

== Men's results ==
=== 100 metres ===
Heats – 11 February

Rank	Heat	Name	Nationality	Time	Notes
1	1	Fernando Salinas	Chile	10.8	Q
2	1	Gustavo Magliano	Uruguay	11.2	Q
3	1	Rodolfo López	Chile	11.3	Q
1	2	Walter Pérez	Uruguay	10.6	Q
2	2	Enrique Falco	Uruguay	10.7	Q
3	2	Carlos Silva	Chile	10.8	Q

Final – 12 February

Rank	Name	Nationality	Time	Notes
1st place, gold medalist(s)	Walter Pérez	Uruguay	10.5	
2nd place, silver medalist(s)	Fernando Salinas	Chile	10.7	
3rd place, bronze medalist(s)	Enrique Falco	Uruguay	11.1	
4	Rodolfo López	Chile	NT	
	Carlos Silva	Chile	NT	
	Gustavo Magliano	Uruguay	NT	

=== 200 metres ===
Heats – ? February

Rank	Heat	Name	Nationality	Time	Notes
1	1	Walter Pérez	Uruguay	21.9	Q
2	1	José Zelaya	Paraguay	22.7	Q
3	1	Gustavo Magliano	Uruguay	23.2	Q
4	1	L. Vermelo	Paraguay	NT	
1	2	Jörn Gevert	Chile	23.0	Q
2	2	Nelson García	Uruguay	23.2	Q
3	2	Enrique Falco	Uruguay	23.?	Q

Final – ? February

Rank	Name	Nationality	Time	Notes
1st place, gold medalist(s)	Walter Pérez	Uruguay	21.9	
2nd place, silver medalist(s)	Jörn Gevert	Chile	22.7	
3rd place, bronze medalist(s)	Enrique Falco	Uruguay	23.0	
4	José Zelaya	Paraguay	NT	
	Gustavo Magliano	Uruguay	NT	
	Nelson García	Uruguay	NT	

=== 400 metres ===
Heats – ? February

Rank	Heat	Name	Nationality	Time	Notes
1	1	Pedro Laborde	Uruguay	50.5	Q
2	1	Carlos Pereira	Uruguay	51.4	Q
3	1	José Zelaya	Paraguay	53.2	Q
1	2	Nelson García	Uruguay	50.7	Q
2	2	Nelson López	Uruguay	51.2	Q
3	2	Guillermo Krauskopf	Paraguay	56.8	Q

Final – ? February

Rank	Name	Nationality	Time	Notes
1st place, gold medalist(s)	Pedro Laborde	Uruguay	52.1	
2nd place, silver medalist(s)	Nelson García	Uruguay	52.1	
3rd place, bronze medalist(s)	Carlos Pereira	Uruguay	NT	
4	Nelson López	Uruguay	NT	
	José Zelaya	Paraguay	NT	
	Guillermo Krauskopf	Paraguay	NT	

=== 800 metres ===
? February

Rank	Name	Nationality	Time	Notes
1st place, gold medalist(s)	Emir Miller	Uruguay	1:58.9	
2nd place, silver medalist(s)	Pedro Laborde	Uruguay	1:59.0	
3rd place, bronze medalist(s)	Nelson García	Uruguay	2:00.3	

=== 1500 metres ===
19 February

Rank	Name	Nationality	Time	Notes
1st place, gold medalist(s)	Raúl Inostroza	Chile	4:02.4	
2nd place, silver medalist(s)	Horst Knüppel	Uruguay	4:05.3	
3rd place, bronze medalist(s)	Emir Miller	Uruguay	4:09.5	
4	Oscar Moreira	Uruguay	NT	

=== 3000 metres ===
11 February

Rank	Name	Nationality	Time	Notes
1st place, gold medalist(s)	Oscar Moreira	Uruguay	8:42.8	NR
2nd place, silver medalist(s)	Raúl Inostroza	Chile	8:43.4	
3rd place, bronze medalist(s)	Horst Knüppel	Uruguay	9:01.2	

=== 5000 metres ===
? February

Rank	Name	Nationality	Time	Notes
1st place, gold medalist(s)	Oscar Moreira	Uruguay	14:51.6	
2nd place, silver medalist(s)	Raúl Inostroza	Chile	15:15.2	
3rd place, bronze medalist(s)	Gilberto Sánchez	Uruguay	15:47.6	

=== 10,000 metres ===
17 February

Rank	Name	Nationality	Time	Notes
1st place, gold medalist(s)	Oscar Moreira	Uruguay	31:08.7	
2nd place, silver medalist(s)	Gilberto Sánchez	Uruguay	32:53.4	
3rd place, bronze medalist(s)	Juan Gau	Uruguay	34:07.2	
4	Héctor Viedman	Paraguay	NT	

=== 12 kilometres cross-country race ===
? February

Rank	Name	Nationality	Time	Notes
1st place, gold medalist(s)	Oscar Moreira	Uruguay	38:43.8	
2nd place, silver medalist(s)	Juan Gau	Uruguay	41:51.8	
3rd place, bronze medalist(s)	Álvaro Donángelo	Uruguay	NT	

=== 110 metres hurdles ===
12 February

Rank	Name	Nationality	Time	Notes
1st place, gold medalist(s)	Jörn Gevert	Chile	15.2	
2nd place, silver medalist(s)	Mario Recordón	Chile	15.3	
3rd place, bronze medalist(s)	Nelson Coitiño	Uruguay	NT	

=== 400 metres hurdles ===
? February

Rank	Name	Nationality	Time	Notes
1st place, gold medalist(s)	Nelson Coitiño	Uruguay	56.0	
2nd place, silver medalist(s)	Juan Torinotti	Uruguay	58.6	

=== 4 × 100 metres relay ===
? February

Rank	Nation	Competitors	Time	Notes
1st place, gold medalist(s)	Uruguay		43.1	
2nd place, silver medalist(s)	Chile		43.6	
3rd place, bronze medalist(s)	Paraguay		45.4	

=== 4 × 400 metres relay ===
17 February

Rank	Nation	Competitors	Time	Notes
1st place, gold medalist(s)	Uruguay "A"	Carlos Pereira, Nelson García, Nelson Coitiño, Pedro Laborde	3:25.9	
2nd place, silver medalist(s)	Uruguay "B"	Nelson López, Emir Miller, Gustavo Magliano, Walter Nodaya	3:35.8	
3rd place, bronze medalist(s)	Paraguay	José Zelaya, Guillermo Krauskopf, H. Verdejo, Julio Perito	3:45.0	

=== High jump ===
11 February

Rank	Name	Nationality	Result	Notes
1st place, gold medalist(s)	Hércules Azcune	Uruguay	1.95	
2nd place, silver medalist(s)	Jörn Gevert	Chile	1.85	
2nd place, silver medalist(s)	Pedro Listur	Uruguay	1.85	
4	Mario Recordón	Chile	?	

=== Pole vault ===
19 February

Rank	Name	Nationality	Result	Notes
1st place, gold medalist(s)	Napoleón Araujo	Bolivia	3.40	
2nd place, silver medalist(s)	Hernán Ortiz	Paraguay	3.40	
3rd place, bronze medalist(s)	Ubaldo Busconi	Uruguay	3.30	
4	Julio Castillo	Uruguay	3.10	

=== Long jump ===
17 February

Rank	Name	Nationality	Result	Notes
1st place, gold medalist(s)	Eduardo Julve	Peru	6.52	
2nd place, silver medalist(s)	Alcides Rodríguez	Uruguay	6.47	
3rd place, bronze medalist(s)	Hernán Figueroa	Chile	6.45	
4	Aldo Zuccolillo	Paraguay	6.30	

=== Triple jump ===
? February

Rank	Name	Nationality	Result	Notes
1st place, gold medalist(s)	Alcides Rodríguez	Uruguay	13.71	
2nd place, silver medalist(s)	Jörn Gevert	Chile	13.59	
3rd place, bronze medalist(s)	Edgar Andrade	Ecuador	13.35	

=== Shot put ===
16 February

Rank	Name	Nationality	Result	Notes
1st place, gold medalist(s)	Eduardo Julve	Peru	13.77	
2nd place, silver medalist(s)	Mario Recordón	Chile	12.80	
3rd place, bronze medalist(s)	Enrique Vázquez	Uruguay	12.43	
4	Hernán Figueroa	Chile	11.99	

=== Discus throw ===
12 February

Rank	Name	Nationality	Result	Notes
1st place, gold medalist(s)	Eduardo Julve	Peru	47.50	
2nd place, silver medalist(s)	Hernán Haddad	Chile	44.29	
3rd place, bronze medalist(s)	Enrique Vázquez	Uruguay	41.92	

=== Hammer throw ===
19 February

Rank	Name	Nationality	Result	Notes
1st place, gold medalist(s)	Rubén Carrerou	Uruguay	50.29	
2nd place, silver medalist(s)	Edmundo Zúñiga	Chile	48.80	
3rd place, bronze medalist(s)	Enrique Vázquez	Uruguay	46.61	

=== Javelin throw ===
? February – old model

Rank	Name	Nationality	Result	Notes
1st place, gold medalist(s)	Janis Stendzenieks	Chile	59.90	
2nd place, silver medalist(s)	Raúl Cóccaro	Uruguay	51.44	
3rd place, bronze medalist(s)	Juan Sastre	Uruguay	48.76	

=== Decathlon ===
19–20 February – 1934 tables (1985 conversions given with *)

The highest mark recorded in each event is highlighted in yellow

Rank	Athlete	Nationality	100m	LJ	SP	HJ	400m	110m H	DT	PV	JT	1500m	Points	Notes
1st place, gold medalist(s)	Hernán Figueroa	Chile	11.2	6.59	12.87	1.80	52.4	17.0	37.88	3.40	49.19	5:11.6	6469	
2nd place, silver medalist(s)	Hércules Azcune	Uruguay	11.0	6.18	11.56	1.90	52.2	18.1	32.23	3.66	43.72	4:57.5	6383	
3rd place, bronze medalist(s)	Eduardo Julve	Peru	11.4	6.50	13.19	1.75	54.6	18.0	47.07	3.10	41.28	5:30.6	6231	
4	Hernán Ortiz	Paraguay	12.2	5.80	10.12	1.65	62.0	21.9	28.83	NM	44.38	5:32.6	3935	
	Aldo Zuccolillo	Paraguay	11.8	6.12	11.05	1.80	56.2	20.5	31.82	NM	DNS	–	DNF	

== Women's results ==
=== 100 metres ===
Heats – 11 February

Rank	Heat	Name	Nationality	Time	Notes
1	1	Adriana Millard	Chile	12.7	Q
1	2	Eliana Gaete	Chile	12.6	Q

Final – 12 February

Rank	Name	Nationality	Time	Notes
1st place, gold medalist(s)	Eliana Gaete	Chile	12.5	
2nd place, silver medalist(s)	Adriana Millard	Chile	12.6	
3rd place, bronze medalist(s)	María Perla Anza	Uruguay	12.7	

=== 200 metres ===
16 February

Rank	Name	Nationality	Time	Notes
1st place, gold medalist(s)	Adriana Millard	Chile	26.2	
2nd place, silver medalist(s)	Beatriz Daher	Uruguay	27.0	
3rd place, bronze medalist(s)	Mirtha Ibarra	Uruguay	27.2	
4	Carmela Antezana	Bolivia	NT	

=== 80 metres hurdles ===
16 February

Rank	Name	Nationality	Time	Notes
1st place, gold medalist(s)	Eliana Gaete	Chile	11.8	
2nd place, silver medalist(s)	Popelka Sosa	Uruguay	13.1	
3rd place, bronze medalist(s)	Juana Cal	Uruguay	13.3	
4	Eliana Revel	Uruguay	NT	

=== 4 × 100 metres relay ===
? February

Rank	Nation	Competitors	Time	Notes
1st place, gold medalist(s)	Uruguay		52.0	
2nd place, silver medalist(s)	Chile		52.9	

=== High jump ===
? February

Rank	Name	Nationality	Result	Notes
1st place, gold medalist(s)	Norma Morales	Uruguay	1.45	
2nd place, silver medalist(s)	Carmela Antezana	Bolivia	1.45	
3rd place, bronze medalist(s)	Adriana Millard	Chile	1.45	

=== Long jump ===
19 February

Rank	Name	Nationality	Result	Notes
1st place, gold medalist(s)	Adriana Millard	Chile	5.35	
2nd place, silver medalist(s)	Eliana Gaete	Chile	5.11	
3rd place, bronze medalist(s)	Carmela Antezana	Bolivia	4.85	
4	Norma Morales	Uruguay	4.81	

=== Shot put ===
19 February

Rank	Name	Nationality	Result	Notes
1st place, gold medalist(s)	Ursula Holle	Chile	10.59	
2nd place, silver medalist(s)	Sara Rosello	Uruguay	10.37	
3rd place, bronze medalist(s)	Eler Goffer	Chile	9.68	

=== Discus throw ===
? February

Rank	Name	Nationality	Result	Notes
1st place, gold medalist(s)	Ursula Holle	Chile	30.01	
2nd place, silver medalist(s)	Sara Rosello	Uruguay	28.72	

=== Javelin throw ===
17 February – old model

Rank	Name	Nationality	Result	Notes
1st place, gold medalist(s)	Estrella Puente	Uruguay	41.14	AR
2nd place, silver medalist(s)	Ursula Holle	Chile	39.05	
3rd place, bronze medalist(s)	Adriana Millard	Chile	?	
4	Sara Rosello	Uruguay	?	
