= Lúcio de Castro =

Brazilian pole vaulter

Personal information
- Nationality: Brazilian
- Born: 1 October 1910
- Died: 20 May 2004 (aged 93)

Sport
- Sport: Athletics
- Event: Pole vault

Lúcio de Castro (1 October 1910 – 20 May 2004) was a Brazilian athlete. He competed in the men's pole vault at the 1932 Summer Olympics.
