= 1952 South American Championships in Athletics =

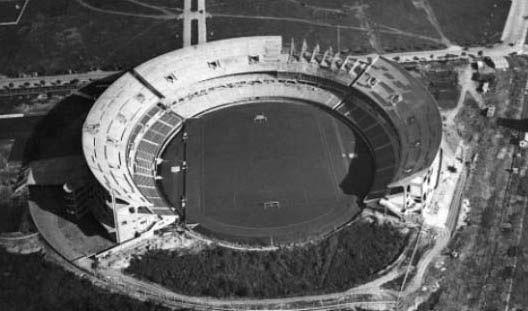
- Host stadium
- Dates: 3–11 May
- Host city: Buenos Aires, Argentina
- Venue: Estadio River Plate
- Participation: 7 nations

The 1952 South American Championships in Athletics were held at the Estadio River Plate in the Argentine capital, Buenos Aires, between 3 and 11 May.

It was the first edition to include the men's 3000 metres steeplechase. This edition also marked the first appearance of Paraguay in the official South American Championships.

== Medal summary ==
=== Men's events ===
Event	Gold		Silver		Bronze	
100 metres (wind: -0.1 m/s)	Gerardo Salazar; Peru	10.7	Gerardo Bönnhoff; Argentina	10.8	José Telles da Conceição; Brazil	10.8
200 metres	Gerardo Bönnhoff; Argentina	21.5	Fernando Lapuente; Argentina	22.0	Gustavo Ehlers; Chile	22.0
400 metres	Gustavo Ehlers; Chile	48.7	Argemiro Roque; Brazil	49.1	Mário do Nascimento; Brazil	49.7
800 metres	Argemiro Roque; Brazil	1:53.3 CR	Waldomiro Monteiro; Brazil	1:53.9	Carlos Gajardo; Chile	1:55.3
1500 metres	Nilo Riveros; Argentina	3:58.5	Guillermo Solá; Chile	3:59.6	Luís Rodrigues; Brazil	4:00.3
5000 metres	Raúl Inostroza; Chile	14:59.8	Reinaldo Gorno; Argentina	15:05.5	Juan Miranda; Argentina	15:09.0
10,000 metres	Delfo Cabrera; Argentina	31:05.7	Raúl Inostroza; Chile	31:26.9	Corsino Fernández; Argentina	31:32.3
Half marathon	Delfo Cabrera; Argentina	1:09:19 CR	Reinaldo Gorno; Argentina	1:11:28	Corsino Fernández; Argentina	1:11:28
110 metres hurdles (wind: -1.7 m/s)	Jörn Gevert; Chile	14.9	Estanislao Kocourek; Argentina	15.0	Wilson Carneiro; Brazil	15.1
400 metres hurdles	Wilson Carneiro; Brazil	52.7 AR	Jörn Gevert; Chile	53.5	Pedro Yoma; Chile	54.6
3000 metres steeplechase	Guillermo Solá; Chile	9:32.0 AR	Edgard Mitt; Brazil	9:34.6	Haroldo Gallardo; Chile	9:38.4
4 × 100 metres relay	Argentina; Enrique Beckles; Mariano Acosta; Gerardo Bönnhoff; Romeo Galán	41.4 AR	Peru; Gerardo Salazar; Máximo Reyes; Óscar Maldonado; Armando Zapata	42.0	Brazil; Alexandre Netto; Rui Lima; Geraldo Murgel; Ary de Sá	42.2
4 × 400 metres relay	Brazil; Wilson Carneiro; Geraldo Maranhão; Mário do Nascimento; Argemiro Roque	3:17.5	Argentina; Máximo Guerra; Enrique Kistenmacher; Adán Torres; Gerardo Bönnhoff	3:18.0	Chile; Ramón Sandoval; Carlos Gajardo; Reinaldo Martín; Gustavo Ehlers	3:18.1
High jump	José Telles da Conceição; Brazil	1.90	Ernesto Lagos; Chile	1.85	Alberto Bacan; Brazil; Hércules Azcune; Uruguay	1.85
Pole vault	Hélcio da Silva; Brazil	4.00 =CR	Jaime Piqueras; Peru	3.90	Luis Ganoza; Peru	3.90
Long jump	Ary de Sá; Brazil	7.39 CR	Carlos Vera; Chile	7.13	Ahylton da Conceição; Brazil	7.08
Triple jump	Adhemar da Silva; Brazil	15.39 CR	Geraldo de Oliveira; Brazil	15.11	Jorgely Figueira; Brazil	14.75
Shot put	Reidar Soerlie; Argentina	14.44	Augusto Maalstein; Chile	13.86	Emilio Stelig; Brazil	13.77
Discus throw	Reidar Soerlie; Argentina	47.72 CR	Elvio Porta; Argentina	45.27	Hernán Haddad; Chile	45.15
Hammer throw	Arturo Melcher; Chile	50.75	Elvio Porta; Argentina	49.73	Emilio Ortiz; Argentina	49.25
Javelin throw	Ricardo Héber; Argentina	67.68 CR	Gerardo Mielke; Chile	63.10	Janis Stendzenieks; Chile	60.51
Decathlon	Hernán Figueroa; Chile	6698	Hernán Alzamora; Peru	5849	Carlos Vera; Chile	5844

=== Women's events ===
Event	Gold		Silver		Bronze	
100 metres	Julia Sánchez; Peru	12.2 CR	Adriana Millard; Chile	12.4	Lilián Buglia; Argentina	12.4
200 metres	Deyse de Castro; Brazil	25.5* CR	Adriana Millard; Chile	25.5* CR	Lilián Heinz; Argentina	25.8
80 metres hurdles	Wanda dos Santos; Brazil	11.7	Marion Huber; Chile	11.7	Adriana Millard; Chile	12.2
4 × 100 metres relay	Argentina; Lilian Heinz; Lilian Buglia; Gladys Erbetta; Ana María Fontán	48.8 CR	Brazil; Benedita de Oliveira; Lucila Pini; Deyse de Castro; Helena de Menezes	48.8	Chile; Aurora Bianchi; Betty Kretschmer; Norma Díaz; Adriana Millard	49.1
High jump	Elizabeth Müller; Brazil	1.53	Deyse de Castro; Brazil	1.53	María Cañas; Chile	1.45
Long jump	Gladys Erbetta; Argentina	5.52	Adriana Millard; Chile	5.39	Wanda dos Santos; Brazil	5.26
Shot put	Ingeborg Mello; Argentina	11.48	Ingeborg Pfüller; Argentina	11.35	Ilse Gerdau; Brazil	11.25
Discus throw	Ingeborg Mello; Argentina	40.14 CR	Ingeborg Pfüller; Argentina	40.07	Ilse Gerdau; Brazil	36.78
Javelin throw	Gerda Martín; Chile	39.16 CR	Edith Thomas; Chile	38.80	Estrella Puente; Uruguay	37.89

* = after run-off, both athletes ran 25.5 in both races

== Medal table ==
Rank	Nation	Gold	Silver	Bronze	Total
1	Argentina (ARG)	12	10	6	28
2	Brazil (BRA)	10	6	12	28
3	Chile (CHI)	7	12	11	30
4	Peru (PER)	2	3	1	6
5	Uruguay (URU)	0	0	2	2
Totals (5 entries)		31	31	32	94

== Team scores ==
=== Combined ===
Rank	Country	Points
1	Argentina	282.5
2	Brazil	259
3	Chile	249
4	Peru	79
5	Uruguay	28.5
6	Paraguay	5
7	Ecuador	1

=== Men ===
Rank	Country	Points
1	Argentina	200
2	Chile	185
3	Brazil	178.5
4	Peru	62
5	Uruguay	18.5
6	Paraguay	5
7	Ecuador	1

=== Women ===
Rank	Country	Points
1	Argentina	82.5
2	Brazil	80.5
3	Chile	64
4	Peru	17
5	Uruguay	10
