= 1953 South American Championships in Athletics (unofficial) =

Unofficial South American Championships in Athletics
- Dates: April, 19-26
- Host city: Santiago, Chile
- Venue: Estadio Nacional
- Level: Senior
- Events: 31
- Participation: 193 athletes from 7 nations

Unofficial South American Championships in Athletics (Campeonato Sudamericano Extraordinario de Atletismo) were held on 19–26 April 1953, at Chile's national stadium, Estadio Nacional in the capital, Santiago.

== Medal summary ==
Medal winners are published.

=== Men ===
Event	Gold		Silver		Bronze	
100 metres	Gerardo Bönnhoff (ARG)	10.9	Romeo Galán (ARG)	11.0	Gerardo Salazar (PER)	11.0
200 metres	Gerardo Bönnhoff (ARG)	21.8	Benedito Ferreira (BRA)	21.8	Gustavo Ehlers (CHI)	22.1
400 metres	Argemiro Roque (BRA)	48.2	Gustavo Ehlers (CHI)	48.5	Ramón Sandoval (CHI)	49.1
800 metres	Ramón Sandoval (CHI)	1:52.3 AR	Argemiro Roque (BRA)	1:53.7	Waldomiro Monteiro (BRA)	1:54.5
1500 metres	Guillermo Solá (CHI)	3:58.6	Juan Miranda (ARG)	4:00.4	Laudionor da Silva (BRA)	4:03.0
5000 metres	Osvaldo Suárez (ARG)	15:23.1	Raúl Ibarra (ARG)	15:25.5	Luis Campusano (CHI)	15:27.0
10,000 metres	Ricardo Bralo (ARG)	31:36.0	Alfredo Cornejo (CHI)	32:10.2	Raúl Ibarra (ARG)	32:19.2
Half Marathon	Reinaldo Gorno (ARG)	1:09:47	Ezequiel Bustamente (ARG)	1:09:49	Juan Gau (URU)	1:11:17
110 metres hurdles	Estanislao Kocourek (ARG)	14.7	Wilson Carneiro (BRA)	14.7	Ijoel da Silva (BRA)	15.0
400 metres hurdles	Wilson Carneiro (BRA)	51.9 AR	Jörn Gevert (CHI)	52.4	Humberto Cabrera (ARG)	53.9
3000 metres steeplechase	Guillermo Solá (CHI)	9:25.3 AR	Edgard Mitt (BRA)	9:28.8	Santiago Novas (CHI)	9:29.7
4 × 100 metres relay	Brazil; Francisco Kadlec; Alexandre Pereira Neto; José Telles da Conceição; Benedito Ferreira	41.7	Argentina; Carlos Isaack; Enrique Beckles; Gerardo Bönnhoff; Romeo Galán	41.9	Chile; Omile-Mascaró; Gustavo Ehlers; García; Hugo Krauss	42.6
4 × 400 metres relay	Brazil; Wilson Carneiro; Mário do Nascimento; Ulisses dos Santos; Argemiro Roque	3:15.5 AR	Chile; Jörn Gevert; Reinaldo Martín; Ramón Sandoval; Gustavo Ehlers	3:17.1	Argentina; Martín Beguiristain; José Elías; Humberto Cabrera; Gerardo Bönnhoff	3:19.1
High jump	José Telles da Conceição (BRA)	1.93	Ernesto Lagos (CHI)	1.93	Carlos Puebla (CHI)	1.85
Pole vault	Eduardo Montes de Oca (ARG)	3.80	Hélcio da Silva (BRA)	3.80	Luis Ganoza (PER)	3.60
Long jump	Ary de Sá (BRA)	7.31	Aldo Zuccolillo (PAR)	7.17	Ahylton da Conceição (BRA)	7.16
Triple jump	Adhemar da Silva (BRA)	15.61	Renato do Nascimento (BRA)	14.95	Alberto Betalleluz (PER)	14.08
Shot put	Alcides Dambrós (BRA)	15.08	Rubén Scaraffia (ARG)	13.74	Nadim Marreis (BRA)	13.61
Discus throw	Eduardo Julve (PER)	46.82	Elvio Porta (ARG)	46.68	Pedro Ucke (ARG)	44.86
Hammer throw	Arturo Melcher (CHI)	49.14	Elvio Porta (ARG)	48.75	Alejandro Díaz (CHI)	48.65
Javelin throw	Ricardo Héber (ARG)	68.23	Janis Stendzenieks (CHI)	64.94	Gerardo Mielke (ARG)	61.96
Decathlon	Carlos Vera (CHI)	5436	Francisco Moura (BRA)	5359	Hércules Azcune (URU)	5291

=== Women ===
Event	Gold		Silver		Bronze	
100 metres	Lilián Buglia (ARG)	12.6	Deyse de Castro (BRA)	12.7	Lilian Heinz (ARG)	12.8
200 metres	Deyse de Castro (BRA)	25.2	Lilian Heinz (ARG)	25.6	Gladys Erbetta (ARG)	26.0
80 metres hurdles	Wanda dos Santos (BRA)	11.7	Eliana Gaete (CHI)	11.7	Anice Burgos (BRA)	12.3
4 × 100 metres relay	Brazil; Deyse de Castro; Benedita de Oliveira; Helena de Menezes; Melânia Luz	48.2 AR	Argentina; Lilian Heinz; Olga Bianchi; Lilián Buglia; Gladys Erbetta	48.7	Chile; María Angélica Cañas; Aurora Bianchi; Eliana Gaete; Lisa Peters	50.3
High jump	Deyse de Castro (BRA)	1.55	Elizabeth Müller (BRA)	1.50	María Angélica Cañas (CHI)	1.45
Long jump	Gladys Erbetta (ARG)	5.54	Lisa Peters (CHI)	5.46	Lilián Buglia (ARG)	5.45
Shot put	Vera Trezoitko (BRA)	11.91	Isabel Avellán (ARG)	11.37	Elizabeth Müller (BRA)	11.11
Discus throw	Isabel Avellán (ARG)	41.17	Ingeborg Pfüller (ARG)	39.09	Erika Trömel (CHI)	38.18
Javelin throw	Anneliese Schmidt (BRA)	39.67	Adriana Silva (CHI)	38.20	Carmen Venegas (CHI)	37.43

== Medal table (unofficial) ==
* Host nation (Chile)

Rank	Nation	Gold	Silver	Bronze	Total
1	Brazil (BRA)	14	9	7	30
2	Argentina (ARG)	11	12	8	31
3	Chile (CHI)*	5	9	11	25
4	Peru (PER)	1	0	3	4
5	Paraguay (PAR)	0	1	0	1
6	Uruguay (URU)	0	0	2	2
Totals (6 entries)		31	31	31	93

== Team scores ==
=== Combined ===
Rank	Country	Points
1	Brazil	311
2	Argentina	263
3	Chile	230
4	Uruguay	37
5	Peru	33
6	Ecuador	14
7	Paraguay	10.5

=== Men ===
Rank	Country	Points
1	Brazil	205
2	Chile	180
3	Argentina	177.5
4	Uruguay	27
5	Peru	33
6	Ecuador	14
7	Paraguay	10.5

=== Women ===
Rank	Country	Points
1	Brazil	106
2	Argentina	86
3	Chile	50
4	Uruguay	10
