= Enrique Inostroza =

Chilean long-distance runner (1913–1993)

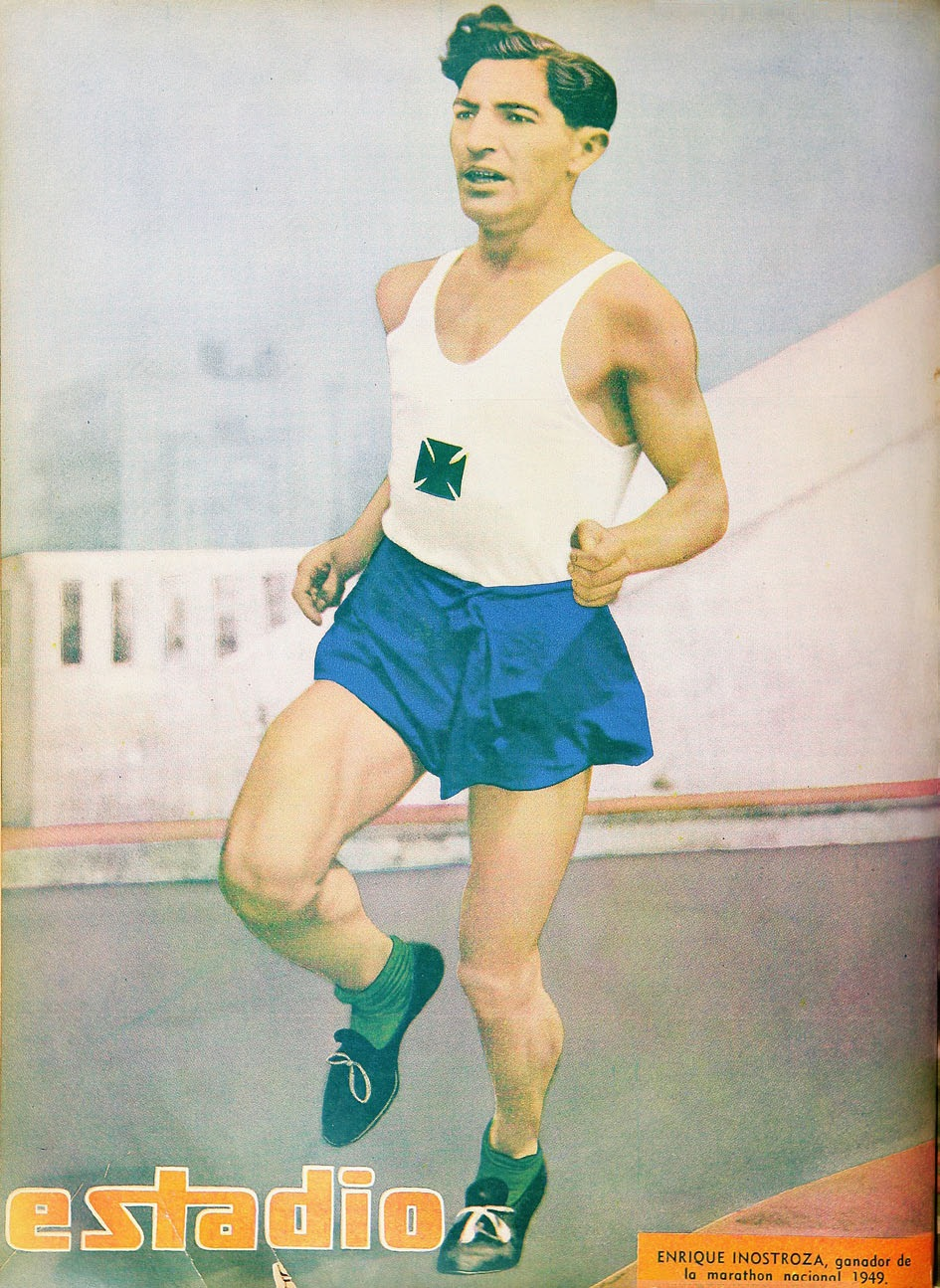

Personal information
- Nationality: Chilean
- Born: 23 February 1913 Santiago, Chile
- Died: April 30, 1993 (aged 80)

Sport
- Sport: Long-distance running
- Event: Marathon

Enrique Inostroza Aranciba (23 February 1913 – 30 April 1993) was a Chilean long-distance runner. He competed in the marathon at the 1948 Summer Olympics. Inostroza died in 2006.

== International competitions ==
Year	Competition	Venue	Position	Event	Notes
Representing Chile
1947	South American Championships	Rio de Janeiro, Brazil	–	20 km	NT
1948	Olympic Games	London, United Kingdom	15th	Marathon	2:47:48
1949	South American Championships	Lima, Peru	7th	12 km cross	NT
1949	South American Championships	Lima, Peru	6th	20 km	1:10:04
1951	Pan American Games	Buenos Aires, Argentina	5th	Marathon	2:53:01
1952	South American Championships	Buenos Aires, Argentina	7th	Half marathon	NT
