= 1949 South American Championships in Athletics – Results =

These are the results of the 1949 South American Championships in Athletics which took place at the Estadio Nacional in Lima, Peru, between 16 and 24 April.

== Men's results ==
=== 100 metres ===
Heats – 16 April

Rank	Heat	Name	Nationality	Time	Notes
1	1	Haroldo da Silva	Brazil	10.8	Q
2	1	Juan Jacinto López	Uruguay	10.8	Q
3	1	Santiago Ferrando	Peru	11.0	
4	1	Alberto Labarthe	Chile	11.0	
5	1	Fernando Lapuente	Argentina	11.0	
6	1	Ricardo Guaramoto	Venezuela	11.7	
1	2	Mario Fayos	Uruguay	11.0	Q
2	2	Máximo Reyes	Peru	11.2	Q
3	2	Gerardo Bönnhoff	Argentina	11.2	
4	2	Carlos Silva	Chile	11.2	
5	2	Ivan Hausen	Brazil	11.3	
6	2	Alfonso Ramos	Ecuador	11.6	
1	3	Gerardo Salazar	Peru	10.8	Q
2	3	Alberto Biederman	Argentina	10.9	Q
3	3	Alexandre Pereira Neto	Brazil	11.0	
4	3	Raúl Dasori	Chile	11.3	
5	3	Mario Drouet	Ecuador	11.6	
6	3	Santos García	Venezuela	11.6	

Final – 17 April

Rank	Lane	Name	Nationality	Time	Notes
1st place, gold medalist(s)	3	Gerardo Salazar	Peru	10.7	
2nd place, silver medalist(s)	6	Haroldo da Silva	Brazil	10.7	
3rd place, bronze medalist(s)	1	Mario Fayos	Uruguay	10.8	
4	2	Juan Jacinto López	Uruguay	10.8	
5	5	Máximo Reyes	Peru	11.0	
6	4	Alberto Biederman	Argentina	11.2	

=== 200 metres ===
Heats – 20 April

Rank	Heat	Name	Nationality	Time	Notes
1	1	Haroldo da Silva	Brazil	22.4	Q
2	1	Alberto Triulzi	Argentina	22.5	Q
3	1	Raúl Dasori	Chile	22.6	
4	1	Adrián Zapata	Peru	22.8	
1	2	Gerardo Salazar	Peru	22.3	Q
2	2	Gustavo Ehlers	Chile	22.3	Q
3	2	Gerardo Bönnhoff	Argentina	22.7	
4	2	Alexandre Pereira Neto	Brazil	22.8	
1	3	Mario Fayos	Uruguay	22.1	Q
2	3	Fernando Lapuente	Argentina	22.4	Q
3	3	Alberto Labarthe	Chile	22.5	

Final – 21 April

Rank	Name	Nationality	Time	Notes
1st place, gold medalist(s)	Mario Fayos	Uruguay	21.7	
2nd place, silver medalist(s)	Fernando Lapuente	Argentina	22.2	
3rd place, bronze medalist(s)	Alberto Triulzi	Argentina	22.5	
4	Haroldo da Silva	Brazil	22.9	
5	Gustavo Ehlers	Chile	NT	
	Gerardo Salazar	Peru	DNS	

=== 400 metres ===
Heats – 16 April

Rank	Heat	Name	Nationality	Time	Notes
1	1	Gustavo Ehlers	Chile	49.9	Q
2	1	Guillermo Evans	Argentina	50.5	Q
3	1	João de Oliveira	Brazil	50.5	
4	1	Alberto Mayer	Peru	51.7	
5	1	Jacinto González	Ecuador	52.2	
1	2	Antonio Pocovi	Argentina	50.0	Q
2	2	Rosalvo Ramos	Brazil	50.3	Q
3	2	José Tovar	Venezuela	51.4	
4	2	Eric Müller	Chile	51.6	
5	2	Ernesto Gómez	Peru	52.5	
1	3	Aníbal Avalos	Argentina	50.1	Q
2	3	Eduardo Laca	Peru	50.2	Q
3	3	Jorge Ehlers	Chile	50.9	
4	3	Argemiro Roque	Brazil	50.9	
5	3	Alfonso Escobar	Ecuador	52.4	

Final – 17 April

Rank	Name	Nationality	Time	Notes
1st place, gold medalist(s)	Gustavo Ehlers	Chile	49.5	
2nd place, silver medalist(s)	Rosalvo Ramos	Brazil	49.8	
3rd place, bronze medalist(s)	Antonio Pocovi	Argentina	50.0	
4	Aníbal Avalos	Argentina	50.2	
5	Guillermo Evans	Argentina	50.3	
6	Eduardo Laca	Peru	51.5	

=== 800 metres ===
23 April

Rank	Name	Nationality	Time	Notes
1st place, gold medalist(s)	Hugo Ponce	Argentina	1:56.6	
2nd place, silver medalist(s)	Nilo Riveros	Argentina	1:56.8	
3rd place, bronze medalist(s)	Agenor da Silva	Brazil	1:57.2	
4	Hugo Nutini	Chile	1:57.3	
5	Aníbal Avalos	Argentina	1:57.8	
6	Antero Mongrut	Peru	1:59.0	
	Hernán Gaona	Chile	NT	
	Alfonso Rozas	Chile	NT	

=== 1500 metres ===
21 April

Rank	Name	Nationality	Time	Notes
1st place, gold medalist(s)	Hugo Nutini	Chile	4:01.2	
2nd place, silver medalist(s)	Melchor Palmeiro	Argentina	4:02.5	
3rd place, bronze medalist(s)	Oscar Gauharou	Argentina	4:03.3	
4	Raúl Inostroza	Chile	4:03.5	
5	Hugo Ponce	Argentina	4:04.7	
6	Agenor da Silva	Brazil	4:07.8	
	Miguel Castro	Chile	NT	
	Antero Mongrut	Peru	NT	

=== 3000 metres ===
17 April

Rank	Name	Nationality	Time	Notes
1st place, gold medalist(s)	Raúl Inostroza	Chile	8:49.2	
2nd place, silver medalist(s)	Melchor Palmeiro	Argentina	8:50.3	
3rd place, bronze medalist(s)	Oscar Moreira	Uruguay	8:50.6	
4	Ricardo Bralo	Argentina	8:53.4	
5	Gustavo Rojas	Chile	8:55.0	
6	Oscar Gauharou	Argentina	8:55.5	
7	Correa	?	NT	
8	Miguel Castro	Chile	NT	
9	Romeu Gamberini	Brazil	NT	
10	Luis Pisconti-Flores	Peru	NT	
11	Darío Castro	Ecuador	9:30.2	NR
	João Oitica	Brazil	NT	
	Máximo Matos	Peru	NT	
	García	Ecuador	NT	

=== 5000 metres ===
20 April

Rank	Name	Nationality	Time	Notes
1st place, gold medalist(s)	Ricardo Bralo	Argentina	15:02.8	
2nd place, silver medalist(s)	Oscar Moreira	Uruguay	15:04.7	
3rd place, bronze medalist(s)	Raúl Inostroza	Chile	15:18.8	
4	Delfo Cabrera	Argentina	15:19.8	
5	Eusebio Guiñez	Argentina	15:31.7	
6	João Oitica	Brazil	15:37.8	
	Miguel Castro	Chile	NT	
	Gustavo Rojas	Chile	NT	

=== 10,000 metres ===
23 April

Rank	Name	Nationality	Time	Notes
1st place, gold medalist(s)	Ricardo Bralo	Argentina	31:46.3	
2nd place, silver medalist(s)	Pedro Caffa	Argentina	31:47.2	
3rd place, bronze medalist(s)	Oscar Moreira	Uruguay	31:48.0	
4	Raúl Inostroza	Chile	32:17.1	
5	Gustavo Rojas	Chile	32:32.8	
6	João Oitica	Brazil	32:33.6	

=== 12 kilometres cross-country race ===
21 April

Rank	Name	Nationality	Time	Notes
1st place, gold medalist(s)	Adán Zárate	Peru	36:52	
2nd place, silver medalist(s)	Oscar Moreira	Uruguay	36:54	
3rd place, bronze medalist(s)	Pedro Caffa	Argentina	36:56	
4	Reinaldo Gorno	Argentina	37:04	
5	Pío González	Chile	37:30	
6	Joaquim da Silva	Brazil	38:10	
9	Enrique Inostroza	Chile	NT	
	José Campagne	Argentina	NT	
	Geraldo Caetano	Brazil	NT	
	Manuel Carreño	Chile	DNF	

=== 20 kilometres road race ===
24 April

Rank	Name	Nationality	Time	Notes
1st place, gold medalist(s)	Delfo Cabrera	Argentina	1:06:52	
2nd place, silver medalist(s)	Oscar Moreira	Uruguay	1:07:02	
3rd place, bronze medalist(s)	Eusebio Guiñez	Argentina	1:09:10	
4	Joaquim da Silva	Brazil	1:09:23	
5	Armando Sensini	Argentina	1:09:36	
6	Enrique Inostroza	Chile	1:10:04	
7	Adán Zárate	Peru	NT	
8	Pío González	Chile	NT	
9	Lino Ruelas	Peru	NT	
10	José dos Santos	Brazil	NT	
11	Leonidas Botiquin	Peru	NT	
12	Rui Dias	Brazil	NT	
	René Aldana	Chile	NT	

=== 110 metres hurdles ===
Heats – 16 April

Rank	Heat	Name	Nationality	Time	Notes
1	1	Alberto Triulzi	Argentina	15.0	Q
2	1	Manuel Aldunate	Chile	15.0	Q
3	1	Erni Markus	Brazil	15.8	
1	2	Jörn Gevert	Chile	15.5	Q
2	2	Edman de Abreu	Brazil	15.8	Q
3	2	Estanislao Kocourek	Argentina	15.9	
4	2	Andrés Montoya	Peru	16.5	
1	3	Wilson Carneiro	Brazil	15.5	Q
2	3	Mario Recordón	Chile	15.5	Q
3	3	Hernán Alzamora	Peru	15.7	
4	3	Francisco Pieslinger	Argentina	15.7	

Final – 17 April

Rank	Name	Nationality	Time	Notes
1st place, gold medalist(s)	Alberto Triulzi	Argentina	14.5	CR
2nd place, silver medalist(s)	Manuel Aldunate	Chile	14.9	
3rd place, bronze medalist(s)	Wilson Carneiro	Brazil	14.9	
4	Mario Recordón	Chile	15.3	
5	Jörn Gevert	Chile	15.6	
6	Edman de Abreu	Brazil	16.5	

=== 400 metres hurdles ===
Heats – 21 April

Rank	Heat	Name	Nationality	Time	Notes
1	1	Edman de Abreu	Brazil	55.5	Q
2	1	Antonio Mur	Argentina	56.2	Q
3	1	Sergio Guzmán	Chile	57.7	
4	1	Guillermo Peratta	Peru	57.7	
5	1	Manuel Burgos	Ecuador	1:01.5	
1	2	Víctor Henríquez	Chile	55.4	Q
2	2	Ernesto Igler	Argentina	56.2	Q
3	2	Héctor Chiessa	Peru	57.3	
4	2	Darcy Machado	Brazil	57.4	
4	2	Carlos Barrrazueta	Ecuador	1:01.3	
1	3	Hermenelindo Alberti	Argentina	55.4	Q
2	3	Carlos Hey	Brazil	55.7	Q
3	3	Eduardo Laca	Peru	55.8	
4	3	Manuel Aldunate	Chile	57.9	
5	3	Leónidas Heinert	Ecuador	1:03.5	

Final – 24 April

Rank	Name	Nationality	Time	Notes
1st place, gold medalist(s)	Hermenelindo Alberti	Argentina	54.7	
2nd place, silver medalist(s)	Víctor Henríquez	Chile	55.4	
3rd place, bronze medalist(s)	Carlos Hey	Brazil	55.5	
4	Ernesto Igler	Argentina	55.8	
5	Antonio Mur	Argentina	56.2	
	Edman de Abreu	Brazil	DQ	

=== 4 × 100 metres relay ===
Heats – 17 April

Rank	Lane	Nation	Competitors	Time	Notes
1	1	Argentina	Gerardo Bönnhoff, Fernando Lapuente, Alberto Biedermann, Adelio Márquez	47.4	Q
2	1	Chile	Alberto Labarthe, Carlos Silva, Raúl Dassori, Rodolfo López	48.3	Q
3	1	Uruguay	Mario Fayos, Bech, Hércules Azcune, Juan Jacinto López	48.4	Q
1	2	Brazil	Alexandre Pereira Neto, Hélio da Silva, Iván Hausen, Haroldo da Silva	43.3	Q
2	2	Peru	Gerardo Salazar, Miguel León Pizzarro, Santiago Ferrando, Máximo Reyes	43.8	Q
3	2	Ecuador	Jacinto González, Maridueña, Alfonso Ramos, Mario Drouet	44.5	Q
4	2	Venezuela	Germán Garrido, José Tovar, Manuel Gómez, Ricardo Guaramoto	NT	

Final – 17 April

Rank	Nation	Competitors	Time	Notes
1st place, gold medalist(s)	Peru	Gerardo Salazar, Miguel León Pizzarro, Santiago Ferrando, Máximo Reyes	42.3	
2nd place, silver medalist(s)	Argentina	Gerardo Bönnhoff, Fernando Lapuente, Alberto Biedermann, Adelio Márquez	42.3	
3rd place, bronze medalist(s)	Chile	Alberto Labarthe, Carlos Silva, Raúl Dassori, Rodolfo López	42.5	
4	Brazil	Alexandre Pereira Neto, Hélio da Silva, Iván Hausen, Haroldo da Silva	43.1	
5	Uruguay	Mario Fayos, Bech, Hércules Azcune, Juan Jacinto López	43.9	
6	Ecuador	Jacinto González, Maridueña, Alfonso Ramos, Mario Drouet	NT	

=== 4 × 400 metres relay ===
23 April

Rank	Nation	Competitors	Time	Notes
1st place, gold medalist(s)	Brazil	João de Oliveira, Argemiro Roque, Rosalvo Ramos, Agenor da Silva	3:19.7	
2nd place, silver medalist(s)	Argentina	Guillermo Evans, Julio Ferreyra, Guillermo Avalos, Antonio Pocovi	3:20.1	
3rd place, bronze medalist(s)	Chile	Víctor Henríquez, Reinaldo Müller, Gustavo Ehlers, Hugo Nutini	3:24.5	
4	Peru	Alberto Mayer, Héctor Menacho, Ernesto Gómez, Antero Mongrut	3:26.5	
5	Ecuador	Mario Drouet, Alfonso Ramos, Alfonso Escobar, Jacinto González	3:26.5	NR

=== High jump ===
17 April

Rank	Name	Nationality	Result	Notes
1st place, gold medalist(s)	Hércules Azcune	Uruguay	1.90	
2nd place, silver medalist(s)	Geraldo de Oliveira	Brazil	1.85	
3rd place, bronze medalist(s)	Alfredo Jadresic	Chile	1.85	
4	Adilton de Almeida	Brazil	1.80	
5	Carlos Vera	Chile	1.80	
6	Reinaldo Pieslinger	Argentina	1.80	

=== Pole vault ===
21 April

Rank	Name	Nationality	Result	Notes
1st place, gold medalist(s)	Eduardo Montes de Oca	Argentina	3.90	
2nd place, silver medalist(s)	Luis Ganoza	Peru	3.90	
3rd place, bronze medalist(s)	Sinibaldo Gerbassi	Brazil	3.80	
4	Raimundo Rodrigues	Brazil	3.80	
5	Jaime Piqueras	Peru	3.80	
6	Eduardo Murata	Peru	3.60	
	Carlos Vera	Chile	3.60	

=== Long jump ===
17 April

Rank	Name	Nationality	Result	Notes
1st place, gold medalist(s)	Enrique Kistenmacher	Argentina	7.365	=CR
2nd place, silver medalist(s)	Carlos Vera	Chile	7.11	
3rd place, bronze medalist(s)	Máximo Reyes	Peru	7.035	
4	Alberto Eggeling	Chile	6.98	
5	Antonio Mur	Argentina	6.885	
6	Walmir Rocha	Brazil	6.88	

=== Triple jump ===
20 April

Rank	Name	Nationality	Result	Notes
1st place, gold medalist(s)	Hélio da Silva	Brazil	15.26	CR
2nd place, silver medalist(s)	Geraldo de Oliveira	Brazil	15.025	
3rd place, bronze medalist(s)	Adhemar da Silva	Brazil	14.79	
4	Walter Peters	Chile	14.49	
5	Jörn Gevert	Chile	14.405	
6	Jorge Mendoza	Peru	14.21	

=== Shot put ===
17 April

Rank	Name	Nationality	Result	Notes
1st place, gold medalist(s)	Julián Llorente	Argentina	14.435	
2nd place, silver medalist(s)	Nadim Marreis	Brazil	14.29	
3rd place, bronze medalist(s)	Juan Kahnert	Argentina	14.245	
4	Emilio Malchiodi	Argentina	13.845	
5	Leonelo Patiño	Peru	13.605	
6	Hernán Figueroa	Chile	12.935	

=== Discus throw ===
21 April

Rank	Name	Nationality	Result	Notes
1st place, gold medalist(s)	Emilio Malchiodi	Argentina	45.065	
2nd place, silver medalist(s)	Karsten Brodersen	Chile	44.755	
3rd place, bronze medalist(s)	Manuel Consiglieri	Peru	44.14	
4	Eduardo Julve	Peru	43.905	
5	Nadim Marreis	Brazil	43.74	
6	Hernán Haddad	Chile	43.36	

=== Hammer throw ===
20 April

Rank	Name	Nationality	Result	Notes
1st place, gold medalist(s)	Edmundo Zúñiga	Chile	50.665	
2nd place, silver medalist(s)	Emilio Ortiz	Argentina	48.215	
3rd place, bronze medalist(s)	Manuel Etchepare	Argentina	48.085	
4	Juan Fusé	Argentina	47.05	
5	Antonio Vodanovic	Chile	45.11	
6	Rubén Carrerou	Uruguay	44.75	

=== Javelin throw ===
16 April

Rank	Name	Nationality	Result	Notes
1st place, gold medalist(s)	Ricardo Heber	Argentina	65.56	AR
2nd place, silver medalist(s)	Horst Walter	Argentina	60.165	
3rd place, bronze medalist(s)	Efraín Santibañez	Chile	57.59	
4	Gerardo Mielke	Argentina	56.30	
5	Honorio de Moraes	Brazil	53.295	
6	Lirio Ko Freitag	Brazil	53.07	
	Eric Müller	Chile	5?.??	
	Edmundo Ohaco	Chile	5?.??	

=== Decathlon ===
23–24 April– 1934 tables (1985 conversions given with *)

The highest mark recorded in each event is highlighted in yellow

Rank	Athlete	Nationality	100m	LJ	SP	HJ	400m	110m H	DT	PV	JT	1500m	Points	Conv.	Notes
1st place, gold medalist(s)	Enrique Kistenmacher	Argentina	11.2	7.11	12.42	1.70	51.5	15.6	39.49	3.00	51.10	4:50.0	6853	6506*	
2nd place, silver medalist(s)	Hércules Azcune	Uruguay	11.5	6.60	10.67	1.85	53.4	17.2	36.32	3.10	47.87	4:57.3	6205	5958*	
3rd place, bronze medalist(s)	Eduardo Julve	Peru	12.1	6.35	12.49	1.70	54.7	17.9	42.01	3.00	48.64	4:51.8	6048	5785*	
4	Eric Müller	Chile	11.9	6.33	11.08	1.73	54.8	16.1	33.19	3.30	47.14	4:51.5	6027	5814*	
5	Celso Doria	Brazil	12.5	6.25	11.56	1.70	56.8	16.9	39.20	3.30	50.47	4:40.4	5966	5714*	
6	Hernán Alzamora	Peru	11.4	5.95	10.43	1.70	53.1	15.5	29.83	2.80	46.13	4:50.7	5848	5704*	
7	Raimundo Rodrigues	Brazil	11.7	6.27	11.07	1.65	54.9	16.9	34.50	3.60	46.00	5:25.3	5856	5608*	
8	Edmundo Ohaco	Chile	12.1	6.52	10.66	1.73	55.8	16.3	35.05	3.10	48.50	5:08.2	5827	5640*	
9	Celestino Sarraua	Argentina	12.1	6.37	12.80	1.73	59.2	17.6	39.70	3.20	48.87	DNF	5520	5089*	
10	Gerardo Mielke	Argentina	12.3	5.99	12.29	1.70	57.3	18.3	38.94	3.30	50.45	DNF	5352	4948*	
11	Julio Baumgarten	Brazil	12.3	6.01	10.92	1.73	58.8	19.4	34.56	2.50	48.30	5:03.8	5145	4974*	
	Miguel Allamand	Chile	12.0	6.34	11.72	1.75	58.6	16.5	35.46	DNS	–	–	DNF		

== Women's results ==
=== 100 metres ===
Heats – 16 April

Rank	Heat	Name	Nationality	Time	Notes
1	1	Adriana Millard	Chile	12.5	Q
2	1	Julia Sánchez	Peru	12.5	Q
3	1	Melânia Luz	Brazil	12.8	Q
4	1	Lilia Menéndez	Argentina	13.2	
5	1	Irma Lavaglia	Argentina	13.6	
6	1	Teresa Venegas	Chile	13.7	
1	2	Benedita de Oliveira	Brazil	12.6	Q
2	2	Elizabeth Müller	Brazil	12.7	Q
3	2	Annegret Weller	Chile	13.2	Q
4	2	Raquel Gamarra	Peru	13.2	
5	2	Nélida Cajide	Argentina	13.3	
6	2	Hilda Yamasaki	Peru	13.3	

Final – 17 April

Rank	Name	Nationality	Time	Notes
1st place, gold medalist(s)	Julia Sánchez	Peru	12.7	
2nd place, silver medalist(s)	Adriana Millard	Chile	12.8	
3rd place, bronze medalist(s)	Benedita de Oliveira	Brazil	12.8	
4	Elizabeth Müller	Brazil	12.9	
5	Melânia Luz	Brazil	13.3	
6	Annegret Weller	Chile	13.5	

=== 200 metres ===
Heats – 20 April

Rank	Heat	Name	Nationality	Time	Notes
1	1	Benedita de Oliveira	Brazil	25.9	Q
2	1	Melânia Luz	Brazil	26.5	Q
3	1	Nélida Cajide	Argentina	26.7	Q
4	1	Annegret Weller	Chile	27.1	
5	1	Julia Huapaya	Peru	27.3	
6	1	Teresa Venegas	Chile	28.2	
1	2	Adriana Millard	Chile	26.4	Q
2	2	Julia Sánchez	Peru	26.9	Q
3	2	Teresa Carvajal	Argentina	27.4	Q
4	2	Deyse de Castro	Brazil	27.6	
5	2	Clara Alfaro	Argentina	28.0	
6	2	Berta Villarreal	Peru	29.5	

Final – 21 April

Rank	Lane	Name	Nationality	Time	Notes
1st place, gold medalist(s)	4	Adriana Millard	Chile	25.8	=AR
2nd place, silver medalist(s)	1	Melânia Luz	Brazil	25.9	
3rd place, bronze medalist(s)	5	Benedita de Oliveira	Brazil	26.5	
4	3	Julia Sánchez	Peru	26.6	
5	2	Nélida Cajide	Argentina	26.6	
6	6	Teresa Carvajal	Argentina	27.4	

=== 80 metres hurdles ===
Heats – 21 April

Rank	Heat	Name	Nationality	Time	Notes
1	1	Wanda dos Santos	Brazil	12.0	Q
2	1	Stella Ardinghi	Brazil	12.5	Q
3	1	Eliana Gaete	Chile	12.5	Q
4	1	Helena Hess	Argentina	12.8	
5	1	Raquel Gamarra	Peru	13.0	
6	1	Lucy López	Chile	14.0	
1	2	Marion Huber	Chile	12.1	Q
2	2	María Spuhr	Argentina	12.4	Q
3	2	Luisa Pfarr	Argentina	12.7	Q
4	2	Lourdes de Abreu	Brazil	13.4	
5	2	Hilda Zelaya	Peru	14.1	
6	2	Hilda Yamasaki	Peru	NT	

Final – 23 April

Rank	Name	Nationality	Time	Notes
1st place, gold medalist(s)	Wanda dos Santos	Brazil	11.7	
2nd place, silver medalist(s)	Marion Huber	Chile	12.2	
3rd place, bronze medalist(s)	Eliana Gaete	Chile	12.3	
4	María Spuhr	Argentina	12.5	
5	Stella Ardinghi	Brazil	12.6	
6	Luisa Pfarr	Argentina	12.9	

=== 4 × 100 metres relay ===
24 April

Rank	Nation	Competitors	Time	Notes
1st place, gold medalist(s)	Brazil	Lucila Pini, Elizabeth Müller, Benedita de Oliveira, Melânia Luz	49.2	CR
2nd place, silver medalist(s)	Chile	Adriana Millard, Annegret Weller, Teresa Venegas, Eliana Gaete	50.8	
3rd place, bronze medalist(s)	Argentina	Lilia Menéndez, Nélida Cajide, Irma Lavaglia, Teresa Carvajal	51.0	
4	Peru	Julia Sánchez, Raquel Gamarra, Raquel Torres, Julia Huapaya	51.3	

=== High jump ===
23 April

Rank	Name	Nationality	Result	Notes
1st place, gold medalist(s)	Elizabeth Müller	Brazil	1.55	
2nd place, silver medalist(s)	Lelia Spuhr	Argentina	1.50	
3rd place, bronze medalist(s)	Hilda Lassen	Brazil	1.50	
4	Luisa García	Argentina	1.45	
5	Gerda Martín	Chile	1.45	
6	Elsa Kaczmarek	Argentina	1.45	
	Zita Brandt	Chile	1.3?	
	Lucy López	Chile	1.3?	

=== Long jump ===
24 April

Rank	Name	Nationality	Result	Notes
1st place, gold medalist(s)	Wanda dos Santos	Brazil	5.53	CR
2nd place, silver medalist(s)	Adriana Millard	Chile	5.415	
3rd place, bronze medalist(s)	Hilda Yamasaki	Peru	5.39	
4	Julia Sánchez	Peru	5.27	
5	Lourdes de Abreu	Brazil	5.16	
6	Melânia Luz	Brazil	5.095	

=== Shot put ===
16 April

Rank	Name	Nationality	Result	Notes
1st place, gold medalist(s)	Ingeborg Mello	Argentina	11.575	
2nd place, silver medalist(s)	Elizabeth Müller	Brazil	11.285	
3rd place, bronze medalist(s)	Haydée Valet	Argentina	11.115	
4	Elma Klempau	Chile	11.065	
5	Leny Brenning	Chile	10.76	
6	Vera Trezoitko	Brazil	10.705	

=== Discus throw ===
20 April

Rank	Name	Nationality	Result	Notes
1st place, gold medalist(s)	Ingeborg Mello	Argentina	37.355	
2nd place, silver medalist(s)	Zita Brandt	Chile	36.275	
3rd place, bronze medalist(s)	Ingeborg Pfüller	Argentina	36.05	
4	Julia Huapaya	Peru	35.515	NR
5	Daysi Hoffman	Chile	34.655	
6	Ivette Mariz	Brazil	34.095	

=== Javelin throw ===
17 April – old model

Rank	Name	Nationality	Result	Notes
1st place, gold medalist(s)	Estrella Puente	Uruguay	37.74	
2nd place, silver medalist(s)	Gerda Martín	Chile	37.39	
3rd place, bronze medalist(s)	Ingeborg Mello	Argentina	36.50	
4	Ursula Holle	Chile	35.31	
5	Anneliese Schmidt	Brazil	34.60	
6	Babete Zoet	Brazil	33.77	
