= John Voight =

John or Jon Voight may refer to:

- Jon Voight (born 1938), American actor
- John Voight (athlete) (1926–1993), American sprinter
- Wolfgang Zilzer (1901–1991), German-American actor who used the stage name "John Voight"
