= Rosalvo =

Rosalvo is a male given name. It may also refer to:

- Rosalvo Bobo (1874–1929), Haitian politician
- Rosalvo Ramos (1914–1966), Brazilian sprinter
- Rosalvo (footballer) (born 1991), Rosalvo Cândido Rosa Júnior, Brazilian footballer
