= Juan Kahnert =

Argentine shot putter (1928–2021)

Personal information
- Nationality: Argentine
- Born: 4 March 1928 Buenos Aires, Argentina
- Died: 3 September 2021 (aged 93) Maryland, USA
- Height: 1.98 m (6 ft 6 in)
- Weight: 105 kg (231 lb)

Sport
- Sport: Athletics
- Event: Shot put

John Hermann Kahnert (born Juan Kahnert, 4 March 1928 – 3 September 2021) represented Argentina at the 1948 Summer Olympics in London, he was entered in the shot put. His personal best in the shot put was 16.75 in 1956.

Kahnert later emigrated to the United States, settling in suburban Baltimore. He earned a PhD and worked as a college professor.

== International competitions ==
Year	Competition	Venue	Position	Event	Notes
Representing Argentina
1947	South American Championships	Rio de Janeiro, Brazil	7th	Shot put	13.18 m
1947	South American Championships	Rio de Janeiro, Brazil	6th	Decathlon	5973 pts
1948	Olympic Games	London, United Kingdom	20th (q)	Shot put	?
1949	South American Championships	Lima, Peru	3rd	Shot put	14.25 m
1951	Pan American Games	Buenos Aires, Argentina	2nd	Shot put	14.27 m

== Personal bests ==
- Shot put – 16.75 (1956)
- Decathlon – 5747 (Rio de Janeiro 1947)
