= Nutini =

Nutini is a surname. Notable people with the surname include:

- Hugo Nutini (1929–2013), Italian-born Chilean and subsequently American professor of anthropology
- Paolo Nutini (born 1987), Scottish singer, songwriter, and musician
