= Hernán Haddad =

Chilean discus thrower (1928–2012)

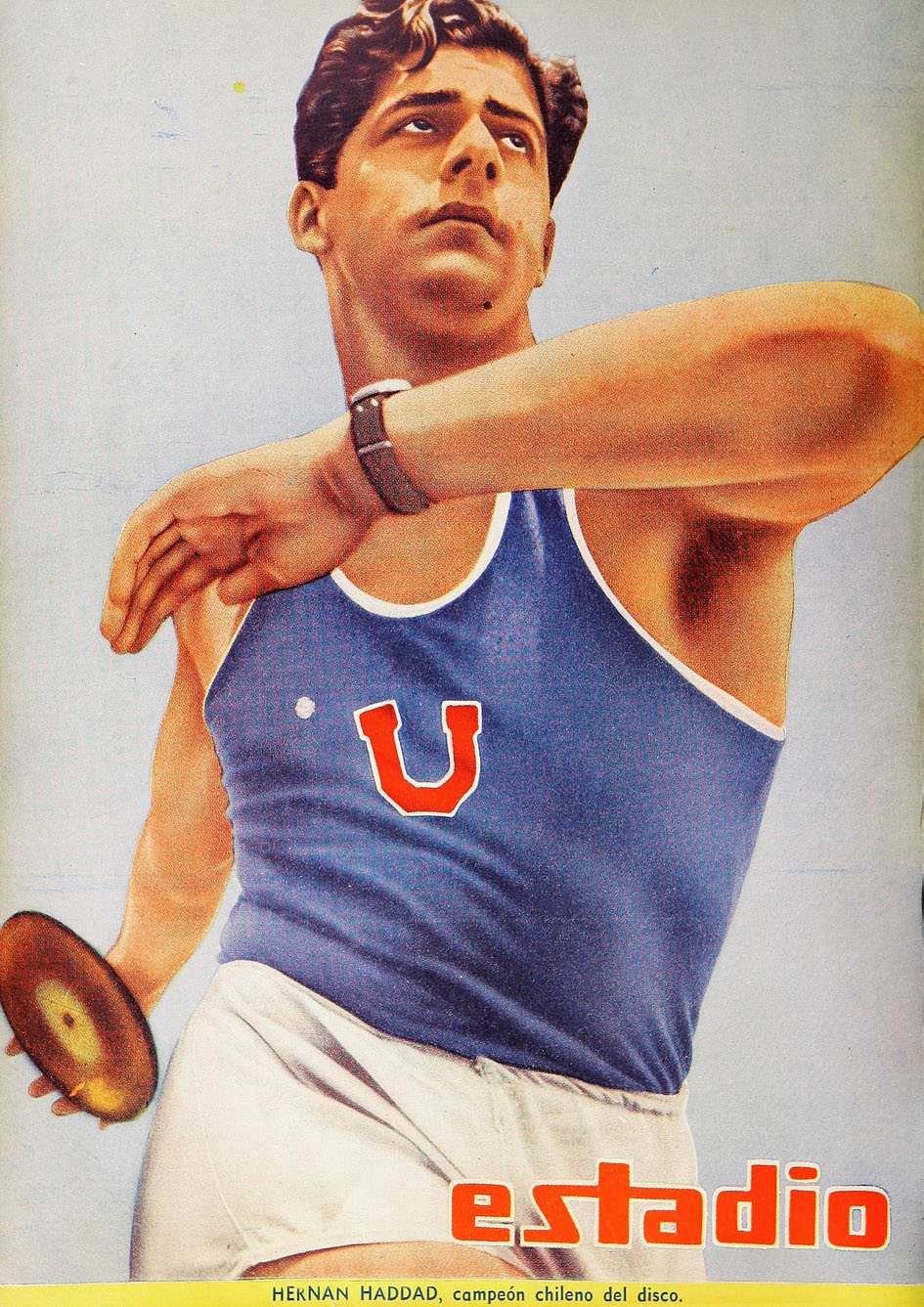

Personal information
- Full name: Hernán Haddad Abdala
- Nationality: Chilean
- Born: 5 October 1928
- Died: 9 May 2012 (aged 83)
- Height: 2.10 m (6 ft 11 in)
- Weight: 115 kg (254 lb)

Sport
- Sport: Athletics
- Event: Discus throw
Medal record
Men's Athletics
Representing Chile
Pan American Games
Bronze medal – third place	1955 Mexico City	Discus throw
Ibero-American Games
Bronze medal – third place	1960 Santiago	Discus throw
South American Championships
Silver medal – second place	1950 Montevideo	Discus throw
Bronze medal – third place	1952 Buenos Aires	Discus throw
Silver medal – second place	1954 São Paulo	Discus throw
Silver medal – second place	1956 Santiago	Discus throw
Silver medal – second place	1957 Santiago	Discus throw
Gold medal – first place	1958 Montevideo	Discus throw
Gold medal – first place	1974 Santiago	Discus throw

Hernán Haddad Abdala (5 October 1928 – 9 May 2012) was a Chilean athlete. He competed in the men's discus throw at the 1952 Summer Olympics and the 1956 Summer Olympics.

== International competitions ==
Year	Competition	Venue	Position	Event	Notes
Representing Chile
1949	South American Championships	Lima, Peru	6th	Discus throw	43.36 m
1950	South American Championships (unofficial)	Montevideo, Uruguay	2nd	Discus throw	44.29 m
1951	Pan American Games	Buenos Aires, Argentina	4th	Discus throw	44.20 m
1952	South American Championships	Buenos Aires, Argentina	3rd	Discus throw	45.15 m
1952	Olympic Games	Helsinki, Finland	28th (q)	Discus throw	42.89 m
1953	South American Championships (unofficial)	Santiago, Chile	4th	Discus throw	44.44 m
1954	South American Championships	São Paulo, Brazil	2nd	Discus throw	46.52 m
1955	Pan American Games	Mexico City, Mexico	3rd	Discus throw	47.14 m
1956	South American Championships	Santiago, Chile	2nd	Discus throw	47.24 m
1956	Olympic Games	Melbourne, Australia	16th	Discus throw	46.00 m
1957	South American Championships (unofficial)	Santiago, Chile	2nd	Discus throw	47.41 m
1958	South American Championships	Montevideo, Uruguay	1st	Discus throw	49.10 m
1959	South American Championships (unofficial)	São Paulo, Brazil	1st	Discus throw	48.17 m
1959	Pan American Games	Chicago, United States	5th	Discus throw	46.45 m
1960	Ibero-American Games	Santiago, Chile	3rd	Discus throw	47.88 m
1962	Ibero-American Games	Madrid, Spain	7th	Discus throw	44.64 m
1971	South American Championships	Lima, Peru	5th	Discus throw	44.68 m
1974	South American Championships	Santiago, Chile	1st	Discus throw	47.12 m

== Personal bests ==
- Discus throw – 50.07 (1959)
