= Emilio Ortíz =

Argentine hammer thrower (born 1922)

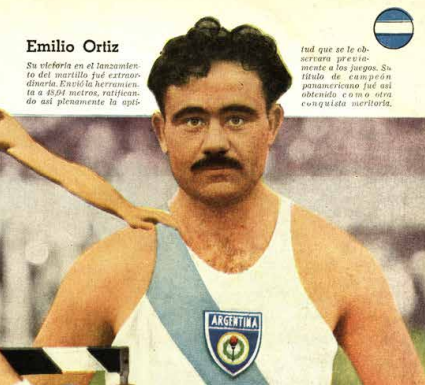

Personal information
- Full name: Emilio Pablo Ortíz
- Born: 18 October 1922
Medal record
Men's Athletics
Representing Argentina
Pan American Games
Gold medal – first place	1951 Buenos Aires	Hammer throw
South American Championships
Silver medal – second place	1949 Lima	Hammer throw
Bronze medal – third place	1952 Buenos Aires	Hammer throw

Emilio Pablo Ortíz (born 18 October 1922) was an Argentine track and field athlete who competed in the hammer throw. His greatest achievement was a gold medal at the inaugural 1951 Pan American Games, held on home turf in Buenos Aires. He won with a mark of 48.04 m (157 ft 7 1/4 in), beating fellow Argentine Manuel Etchepare by nearly two metres. He was a surprise winner of that event, over more favoured opposition. Ortíz remained the only South American to win that hammer title until he was matched by his fellow countryman Juan Ignacio Cerra in 2003.

Ortíz was twice a medallist at the South American Championships in Athletics, taking silver behind Chile's Edmundo Zúñiga in 1949 then a bronze with 49.25 m (161 ft 6 3/4 in) at the 1952 Championships.

His personal best in the event was 51.24 m (168 ft 1 1/4 in) set in Necochea in 1948.

== International competitions ==
Year	Competition	Venue	Position	Event	Notes
Representing Argentina
1949	South American Championships	Lima, Peru	2nd	Hammer throw	48.22 m
1951	Pan American Games	Buenos Aires, Argentina	1st	Hammer throw	48.04 m
1952	South American Championships	Buenos Aires, Argentina	3rd	Hammer throw	49.25 m
1953	South American Championships (unofficial)	Santiago, Chile	4th	Hammer throw	46.92 m
