= Athletics at the 1951 Pan American Games – Men's 4 × 100 metres relay =

Men's 4 × 100 metres relay at the Pan American Games

The men's 4 × 100 metres relay event at the 1951 Pan American Games was held at the Estadio Monumental in Buenos Aires on 5 and 6 March.

== Medallists ==
| Gold | Silver | Bronze |
|---|---|---|
| United States; Donald Campbell; Art Bragg; Dick Attlesey; John Voight | Cuba; Raúl Mazorra; Angel García; Jesús Farrés; Rafael Fortún | Argentina; Gerardo Bönnhoff; Adelio Márquez; Fernando Lapuente; Mariano Acosta |

== Results ==
=== Heats ===
| Rank | Heat | Nation | Athletes | Time | Notes |
|---|---|---|---|---|---|
| 1 | 1 | United States | Donald Campbell, Art Bragg, Dick Attlesey, John Voight | 41.3 | Q |
| 2 | 1 | Cuba | Raúl Mazorra, Angel García, Jesús Farrés, Rafael Fortún | 41.7 | Q |
| 3 | 1 | Argentina | Gerardo Bönnhoff, Adelio Márquez, Fernando Lapuente, Mariano Acosta | 41.9 | q |
| 4 | 1 | Chile | Leonel Contreras, Rodolfo López, Gustavo Ehlers, Fernando Salinas | 42.2 | q |
| 1 | 2 | Colombia | Aristipo Lerma, Armando Muñoz, Alfaro Parra, Jaime Aparicio | 43.2 | Q |
| 2 | 2 | Peru | Oscar Maldonado, Santiago Ferrando, Miguel León, Gerardo Salazar | 43.3 | Q |
| 3 | 2 | Paraguay | Celso González, Alfredo Rodas, Fermín Villalba, José Zelaya | 43.8 | |

=== Final ===
| Rank | Nation | Athletes | Time | Notes |
|---|---|---|---|---|
| 1st place, gold medalist(s) | United States | Donald Campbell, Art Bragg, Dick Attlesey, John Voight | 41.0 | |
| 2nd place, silver medalist(s) | Cuba | Raúl Mazorra, Angel García, Jesús Farrés, Rafael Fortún | 41.2 | |
| 3rd place, bronze medalist(s) | Argentina | Gerardo Bönnhoff, Adelio Márquez, Fernando Lapuente, Mariano Acosta | 41.8 | |
| 4 | Chile | Leonel Contreras, Rodolfo López, Gustavo Ehlers, Fernando Salinas | 42.3 | |
| 5 | Colombia | Aristipo Lerma, Armando Muñoz, Alfaro Parra, Jaime Aparicio | 42.8 | |
| 6 | Peru | Oscar Maldonado, Santiago Ferrando, Miguel León, Gerardo Salazar | ??.? | |
