= Gustavo Ehlers =

Chilean sprinter (1925–2017)

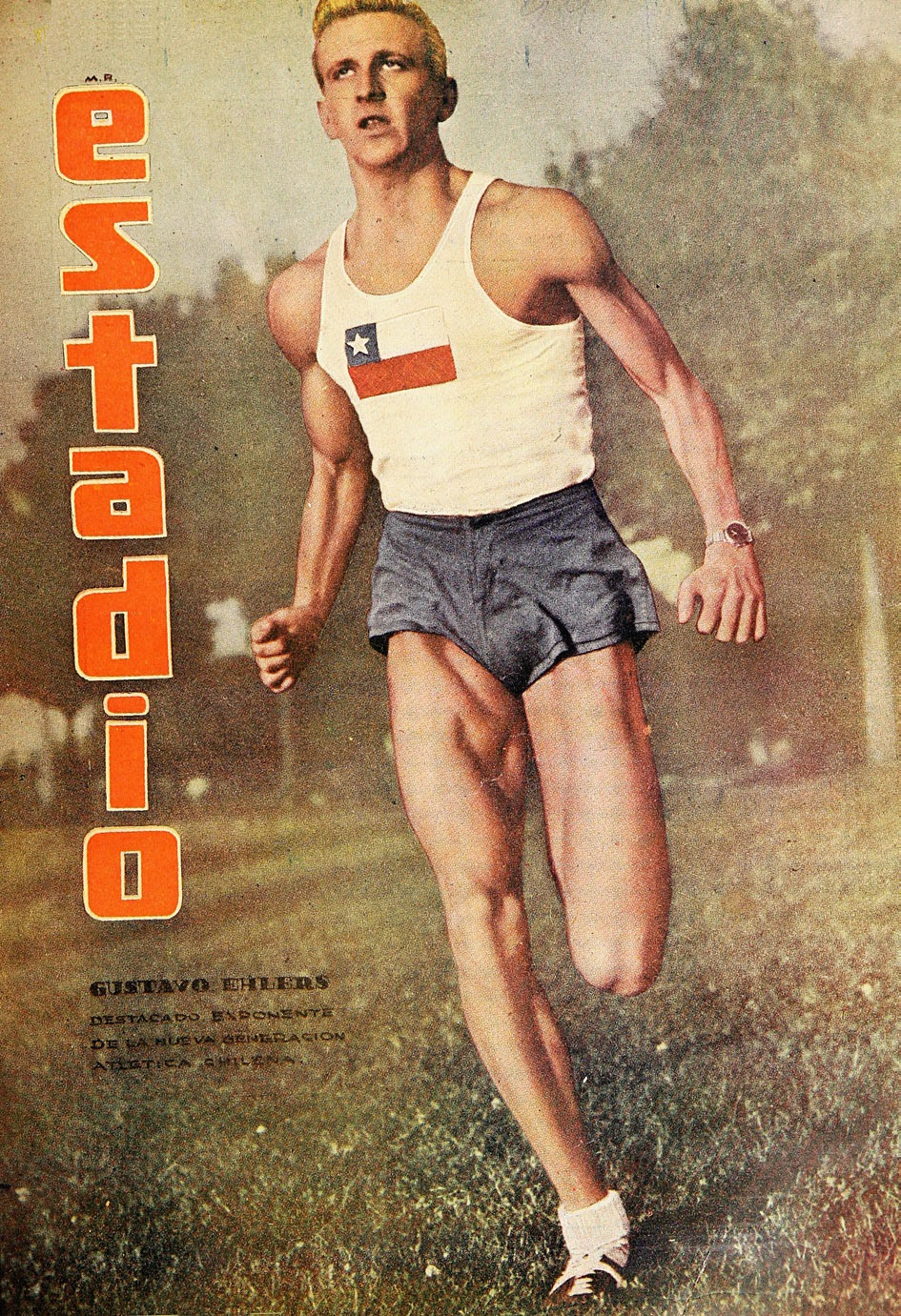

Personal information
- Full name: Gustavo Arturo Germán Ehlers Trostel
- Born: 23 June 1925 Santiago, Chile
- Died: 8 July 2017 (aged 92) Santiago, Chile
- Height: 1.85 m (6 ft 1 in)
- Weight: 75 kg (165 lb)

Sport
- Sport: Sprinting
- Event: 400 metres

Gustavo Arturo Germán Ehlers Trostel (23 June 1925 – 8 July 2017) was a Chilean sprinter. He competed in the men's 400 metres at the 1948 Summer Olympics.

== International competitions ==
Year	Competition	Venue	Position	Event	Notes
Representing Chile
1946	South American Championships (unofficial)	Santiago, Chile	3rd	400 m hurdles	55.7
1947	South American Championships	Rio de Janeiro, Brazil	1st	400 m	49.0
1947	South American Championships	Rio de Janeiro, Brazil	2nd	4 × 400 m relay	3:17.0
1948	Olympic Games	London, United Kingdom	18th (qf)	400 m	49.5
1948	Olympic Games	London, United Kingdom	11th (h)	4 × 400 m relay	3:23.8
1949	South American Championships	Lima, Peru	1st	200 m	NT
1949	South American Championships	Lima, Peru	1st	400 m	49.5
1949	South American Championships	Lima, Peru	3rd	4 × 400 m relay	3:24.5
1951	Pan American Games	Buenos Aires, Argentina	11th (sf)	200 m	22.9
1951	Pan American Games	Buenos Aires, Argentina	6th	400 m	49.4
1951	Pan American Games	Buenos Aires, Argentina	4th	4 × 100 m relay	42.3
1951	Pan American Games	Buenos Aires, Argentina	2nd	4 × 400 m relay	3:17.7
1952	South American Championships	Buenos Aires, Argentina	3rd	200 m	22.0
1952	South American Championships	Buenos Aires, Argentina	1st	400 m	48.7
1952	South American Championships	Buenos Aires, Argentina	3rd	4 × 400 m relay	3:18.1
1953	South American Championships (unofficial)	Santiago, Chile	6th	100 m	11.3
1953	South American Championships (unofficial)	Santiago, Chile	3rd	200 m	22.1
1953	South American Championships (unofficial)	Santiago, Chile	2nd	400 m	48.5
1953	South American Championships (unofficial)	Santiago, Chile	3rd	4 × 100 m relay	42.6
1953	South American Championships (unofficial)	Santiago, Chile	2nd	4 × 400 m relay	3:17.1
1954	South American Championships	São Paulo, Brazil	12th (sf)	200 m	23.6
1954	South American Championships	São Paulo, Brazil	4th	400 m	49.7
1954	South American Championships	São Paulo, Brazil	2nd	4 × 400 m relay	3:16.9

== Personal bests ==
- 400 metres – 47.9h (1951)
