= Athletics at the 1951 Pan American Games – Men's 5000 metres =

Men's 5000 metres at the Pan American Games

The men's 5000 metres event at the 1951 Pan American Games was held at the Estadio Monumental in Buenos Aires on 1 March.

== Results ==
Rank	Name	Nationality	Time	Notes
1st place, gold medalist(s)	Ricardo Bralo	Argentina	14:57.2	
2nd place, silver medalist(s)	John Twomey	United States	14:57.5	
3rd place, bronze medalist(s)	Gustavo Rojas	Chile	15:06.4	
4	Browning Ross	United States	15:11.5	
5	Raúl Inostroza	Chile	?:??.?	
6	Gilberto Miori	Argentina	?:??.?	
	Alfonso Cornejo	Chile	?:??.?	
	Mateo Flores	Guatemala	?:??.?	
	Guillermo Rojas	Guatemala	?:??.?	
	Francisco Hernández	Mexico	?:??.?	
	Carlton Chambers	Trinidad and Tobago	?:??.?	
	José Oitica	Brazil	DNF	
	Curt Stone	United States	DNS	
	Raúl Ibarra	Argentina	DNS	
