= Melchor Palmeiro =

Argentine middle-distance runner

Medal record

Men's athletics

Representing Argentina

South American Championships
Gold medal – first place	1947 Rio de Janeiro	1500 m
Silver medal – second place	1943 Santiago	1500 m
Silver medal – second place	1949 Lima	1500 m

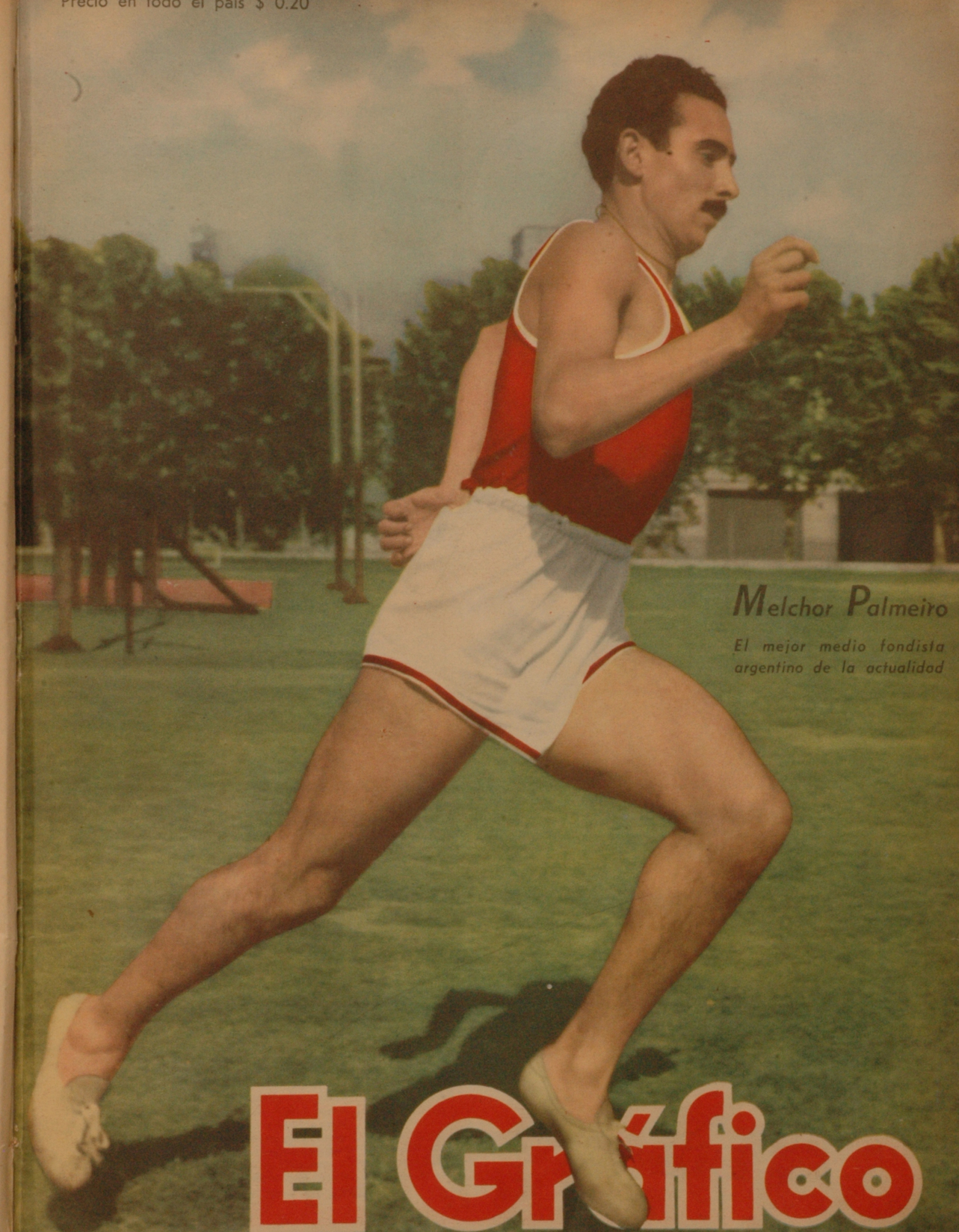
The Graphic of February 07, 1947. Edition 1439

Melchor Palmeiro (26 February 1923 – 31 December 1997) represented Argentina at the 1948 Summer Olympics in London. He was entered in the 1500 m, where he finished fifth in his heat recording a time of 4:01.6 and failed to advance. His personal best in the 1500m was 3:57.8 when he came first at the 1947 South American Championships. He also came second at the Championships in 1943 and again in 1949.

== International competitions ==
Year	Competition	Venue	Position	Event	Notes
Representing Argentina
1943	South American Championships	Santiago, Chile	2nd	1500 m	4:03.5
1943	South American Championships	Santiago, Chile	6th	3000 m	NT
1946	South American Championships (unofficial)	Santiago, Chile	3rd	3000 m	8:55.8
1947	South American Championships	Rio de Janeiro, Brazil	1st	1500 m	3:57.8
1947	South American Championships	Rio de Janeiro, Brazil	5th	3000 m	NT
1948	Olympic Games	London, United Kingdom	5th (h)	1500 m	4:01.6
1949	South American Championships	Lima, Peru	2nd	1500 m	4:02.5
1949	South American Championships	Lima, Peru	2nd	3000 m	8:50.3

== Personal bests ==
- 1500 metres – 3:57.8h (1947)
