= Geraldo de Oliveira =

Brazilian athletics competitor (1919–1996)

Personal information
- Born: 23 November 1919 São Paulo, Brazil
- Died: 26 May 1996 (aged 76) Nova Iguaçu, Brazil
- Height: 1.80 m (5 ft 11 in)
- Weight: 65 kg (143 lb)

Sport
- Sport: Athletics
- Events: Long jump Triple jump

Geraldo de Oliveira (23 November 1919 – 26 May 1996) was a Brazilian athlete. He competed at the 1948 Summer Olympics and the 1952 Summer Olympics.

== International competitions ==
Year	Competition	Venue	Position	Event	Notes
Representing Brazil
1945	South American Championships	Montevideo, Uruguay	1st	Triple jump	14.43 m
1946	South American Championships (unofficial)	Santiago, Chile	1st	Long jump	7.03 m
1946	South American Championships (unofficial)	Santiago, Chile	1st	Triple jump	15.00 m
1947	South American Championships	Rio de Janeiro, Brazil	1st	Triple jump	15.16 m
1948	Olympic Games	London, United Kingdom	5th	Triple jump	14.825 m
1949	South American Championships	Lima, Peru	2nd	High jump	1.85 m
1949	South American Championships	Lima, Peru	2nd	Triple jump	15.03 m
1952	South American Championships	Buenos Aires, Argentina	5th	High jump	1.85 m
1952	South American Championships	Buenos Aires, Argentina	2nd	Triple jump	15.11 m
1952	Olympic Games	Helsinki, Finland	23rd (q)	Long jump	6.71 m
1952	Olympic Games	Helsinki, Finland	7th	Triple jump	14.95 m

== Personal bests ==
- Long jump – 7.17 (1945)
- Triple jump – 15.41 (1948)
