= Ricardo Bralo =

Argentine long-distance runner (born 1916)

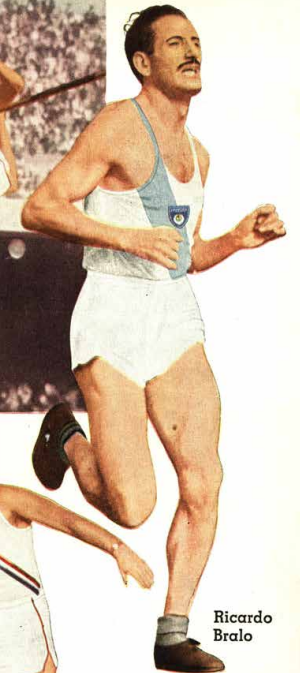
- Bralo in 1951

Personal information
- Full name: Ricardo Armando Bralo Gil
- Born: 28 August 1916 Buenos Aires, Argentina
- Died: Unknown
Medal record
Men's athletics
Representing Argentina
Pan American Games
Gold medal – first place	1951 Buenos Aires	5000 metres

Ricardo Armando Bralo Gil (born 28 August 1916, date of death unknown) was an Argentine long-distance runner from Buenos Aires, who won the gold medal in the men's 5000 metres event at the 1951 Pan American Games. He represented his native country at the 1948 Summer Olympics in London, United Kingdom. Bravo is deceased.

== International competitions ==
Year	Competition	Venue	Position	Event	Notes
Representing Argentina
1946	South American Championships (unofficial)	Santiago, Chile	2nd	1500 m	4:01.9
1947	South American Championships (unofficial)	Rio de Janeiro, Brazil	1st	3000 m	8:44.3
1948	Olympic Games	London, United Kingdom	–	10,000 m	NT
1949	South American Championships (unofficial)	Lima, Peru	4th	3000 m	8:53.4
1949	South American Championships (unofficial)	Lima, Peru	1st	5000 m	15:02.8
1949	South American Championships (unofficial)	Lima, Peru	1st	10,000 m	31:46.3
1951	Pan American Games	Buenos Aires, Argentina	1st	5000 m	14:57.2
1951	Pan American Games	Buenos Aires, Argentina	2nd	10,000 m	31:10.4
1953	South American Championships (unofficial)	Santiago, Chile	1st	10,000 m	31:36.0

== Personal bests ==
- Mile – 4:18.0h (Buenos Aires 1951)
- 2000 metres – 5:29.3h (Buenos Aires 1951)
- 10,000 metres – 31:09.0h (1947)

== Sources ==
- sports-reference
