= Emilio Malchiodi =

Argentine shot putter and discus thrower

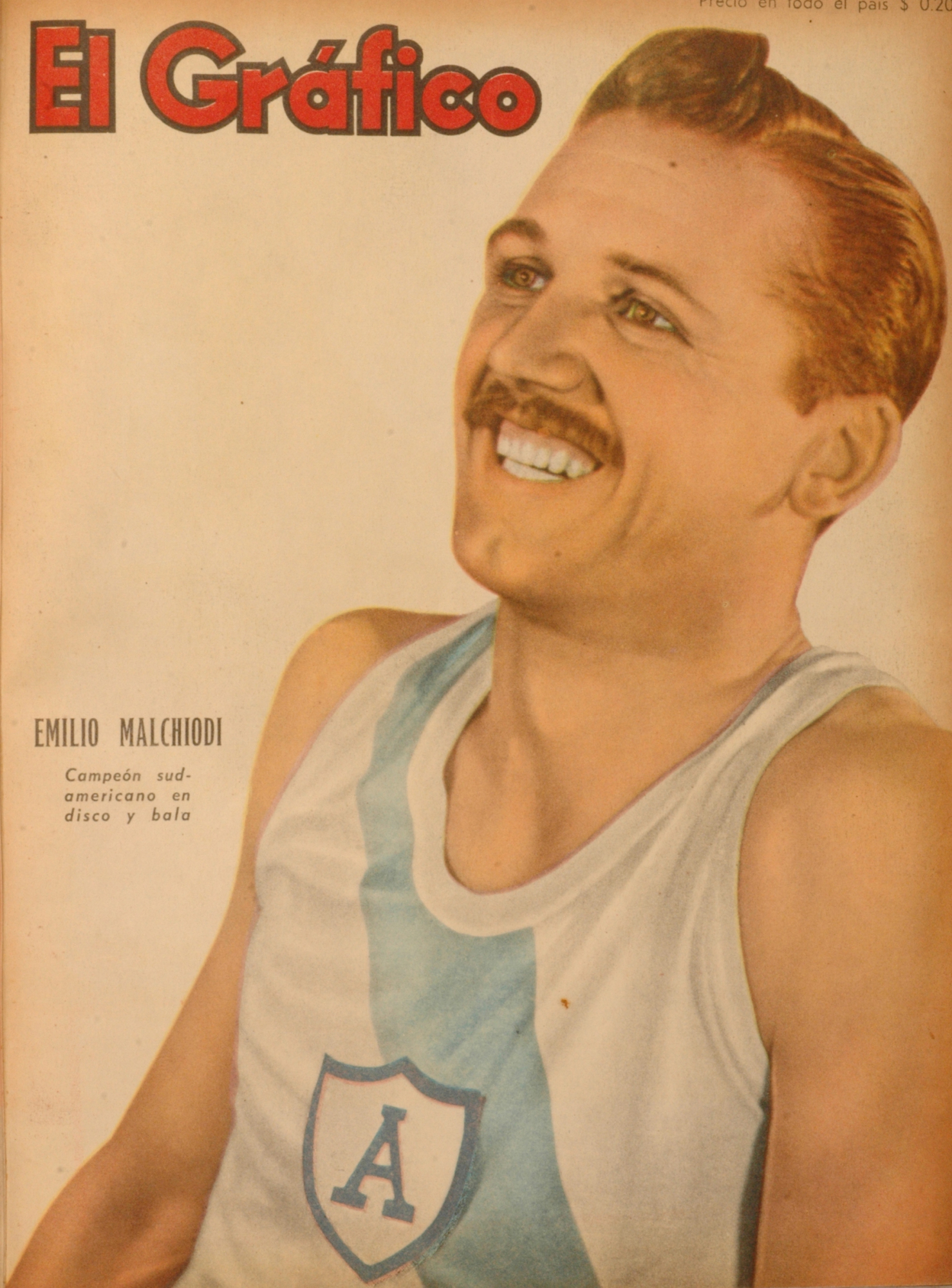

Personal information
- Full name: Emilio Víctor Malchiodi
- Nationality: Argentine
- Born: March 28, 1922 Junín, Buenos Aires
- Died: November 21, 1997 (aged 75) Junín, Buenos Aires
- Height: 1.88 m (6 ft 2 in)
- Weight: 88 kg (194 lb)

Sport
- Sport: Track and field
- Events: Shot put and Discus

Emilio Víctor Malchiodi (March 28, 1922 – November 21, 1997) was an Argentine athlete. He competed in the shot put and the discus event at the 1948 Summer Olympics. He came 5th at the 1951 Pan American Games in the discus.

== International competitions ==
Year	Competition	Venue	Position	Event	Notes
Representing Argentina
1945	South American Championships	Montevideo, Uruguay	1st	Shot Put	14.69 m
1945	South American Championships	Montevideo, Uruguay	1st	Discus throw	44.27 m
1946	South American Championships (unofficial)	Santiago, Chile	2nd	Shot put	14.08 m
1946	South American Championships (unofficial)	Santiago, Chile	3rd	Discus throw	41.66 m
1947	South American Championships	Rio de Janeiro, Brazil	1st	Shot put	14.30 m
1947	South American Championships	Rio de Janeiro, Brazil	3rd	Discus throw	43.92 m
1948	Olympic Games	London, United Kingdom	20th (q)	Shot put	?
1948	Olympic Games	London, United Kingdom	18th (q)	Discus throw	42.98 m
1949	South American Championships	Lima, Peru	4th	Shot put	13.845 m
1949	South American Championships	Lima, Peru	1st	Discus throw	45.07 m
1951	Pan American Games	Buenos Aires, Argentina	5th	Discus throw	44.16 m
1952	South American Championships	Buenos Aires, Argentina	5th	Discus throw	43.45 m

== Personal bests ==
- Shot put – 15.36 (1947)
- Discus throw – 46.81 (1947)
