= Manuel Etchepare =

Argentinian athletics competitor

Personal information
- Nickname: El Vasco
- Born: 17 June 1904 Junín, Argentina
- Died: Unknown

Sport
- Sport: Athletics
- Event: Hammer throw
- Club: Centro Empleados del Ferrocarril
- Coached by: Eusebio Palavecino
- Retired: 1958

Manuel Etchepare (17 June 1904 – date of death unknown) was an Argentine athlete who specialised in the hammer throw. He won several medals at regional level including the silver at the inaugural 1951 Pan American Games.

== International competitions ==
| Year | Competition | Venue | Position | Event | Notes |
Representing Argentina
| 1943 | South American Championships | Santiago, Chile | 1st | Hammer throw | 46.81 m |
| 1945 | South American Championships | Montevideo, Uruguay | 5th | Hammer throw | 45.93 m |
| 1947 | South American Championships | Rio de Janeiro, Brazil | 4th | Hammer throw | 45.64 m |
| 1949 | South American Championships | Lima, Peru | 3rd | Hammer throw | 48.09 m |
| 1951 | Pan American Games | Buenos Aires, Argentina | 2nd | Hammer throw | 46.12 m |
| 1952 | South American Championships | Buenos Aires, Argentina | 4th | Hammer throw | 47.25 m |
| 1956 | South American Championships | Santiago, Chile | 9th | Hammer throw | 43.24 m |
| 1957 | South American Championships (unofficial) | Santiago, Chile | 5th | Hammer throw | 45.85 m |

== Personal bests ==
- Hammer throw – 49.25 (Buenos Aires 1952)
