= Fernando Lapuente =

Argentine sprinter (1928–1993)

Medal record

Men's athletics

Representing Argentina

Pan American Games
Bronze medal – third place	1951 Buenos Aires	4x100m relay

Fernando Marcelino Lapuente (31 January 1928 – 2 September 1993) represented Argentina at the 1948 Summer Olympics in London, he was entered in the 100 m and the 4 × 100 m relay, but did not get past the heats in either event. His personal best for 100m was 10.6 seconds in 1949.

== International competitions ==
Year	Competition	Venue	Position	Event	Notes
Representing Argentina
1948	Olympic Games	London, United Kingdom	36th (h)	100 m	11.16
1948	Olympic Games	London, United Kingdom	8th (h)	4 × 100 m relay	42.4
1949	South American Championships	Lima, Peru	7th (h)	100 m	11.0
1949	South American Championships	Lima, Peru	2nd	200 m	22.2
1949	South American Championships	Lima, Peru	2nd	4 × 100 m relay	42.3
1951	Pan American Games	Buenos Aires, Argentina	6th	200 m	NT
1951	Pan American Games	Buenos Aires, Argentina	3rd	4 × 100 m relay	41.8
1952	South American Championships	Buenos Aires, Argentina	2nd	200 m	22.0
1952	South American Championships	Buenos Aires, Argentina	1st	4 × 100 m relay	41.4
1953	International University Sports Week	Dortmund, West Germany	1st	4 × 100 m relay	42.2
