= Antonio Pocovi =

Argentine sprinter (1922–2004)

Personal information
- Full name: Antonio Sebastián Pocovi
- Nationality: Argentine
- Born: January 20, 1922 Laguna Paiva, Argentina
- Died: November 18, 2004 (aged 82) Buenos Aires, Argentina

Sport
- Sport: Track & Field
- Event: 400m
- Club: Club Atlético Velocidad y Resistencia

Antonio Sebastián Pocovi (January 20, 1922 – November 18, 2004) was an Argentine athlete who competed in the 1948 Summer Olympics in the 400m and the 4 × 400 m relay, in both events he finished 3rd in the first round and failed to advance. He also trained athletes and served as a coach of the national team.

== International competitions ==
| Year | Competition | Venue | Position | Event | Notes |
Representing Argentina
| 1945 | South American Championships | Montevideo, Uruguay | 5th | 400 m | NT |
| 1945 | South American Championships | Montevideo, Uruguay | 2nd | 4 × 400 m relay | 3:20.0 |
| 1946 | South American Championships (unofficial) | Santiago, Chile | 2nd | 400 m | 49.1 |
| 1946 | South American Championships (unofficial) | Santiago, Chile | 2nd | 800 m | 1:54.0 |
| 1947 | South American Championships | Rio de Janeiro, Brazil | 2nd | 400 m | 49.2 |
| 1947 | South American Championships | Rio de Janeiro, Brazil | 1st | 4 × 400 m relay | 3:16.0 |
| 1948 | Olympic Games | London, United Kingdom | 35th (h) | 400 m | 50.7 |
| 1948 | Olympic Games | London, United Kingdom | 9th (h) | 4 × 400 m relay | 3:21.2 |
| 1949 | South American Championships | Lima, Peru | 3rd | 400 m | 50.0 |
| 1949 | South American Championships | Lima, Peru | 2nd | 4 × 400 m relay | 3:20.1 |

== Personal bests ==
- 400 metres – 48.7h (1947)
