= Athletics at the 1951 Pan American Games – Men's marathon =

Men's marathon at the Pan American Games

The men's marathon event at the 1951 Pan American Games was held at the Estadio Monumental in Buenos Aires on 6 March.

== Results ==
Rank	Name	Nationality	Time	Notes
1st place, gold medalist(s)	Delfo Cabrera	Argentina	2:35:01	
2nd place, silver medalist(s)	Reinaldo Gorno	Argentina	2:45:00	
3rd place, bronze medalist(s)	Luis Velásquez	Guatemala	2:46:03	
4	Luis Lagoa	Argentina	2:51:12	
5	Enrique Inostroza	Chile	2:53:01	
6	David Penden	Chile	2:53:59	
7	Gustavo Ramírez	Colombia	3:02:11	
8	Carlos Marcos	Guatemala	3:05:07	
9	Julio Chavarria	Colombia	3:19:43	
