= Guillermo Avalos =

Argentine middle-distance runner (1923–1978)

Aníbal Guillermo Ávalos
Personal information
- Full name: Aníbal Guillermo Avalos
- Born: 23 February 1923 Olavarria, Argentina
- Died: 19 March 1978 (aged 55) Béccar, Argentina

Sport
- Sport: Track & Field
- Events: 400 metres, 800 metres

Aníbal Guillermo Avalos (23 February 1923 – 19 March 1978) was an Argentine athlete who competed in the 1948 Summer Olympics in the 800m and 4 × 400 m relay, but he failed to advance past the first round in either event.

Avalos died in Béccar on 19 March 1978, at the age of 55.

== International competitions ==
Year	Competition	Venue	Position	Event	Notes
Representing Argentina
1947	South American Championships	Rio de Janeiro, Brazil	3rd	400 m	49.5
1947	South American Championships	Rio de Janeiro, Brazil	1st	4 × 400 m relay	3:16.0
1948	Olympic Games	London, United Kingdom	29th (h)	800 m	1:56.6
1948	Olympic Games	London, United Kingdom	9th (h)	4 × 400 m relay	3:21.2
1949	South American Championships	Lima, Peru	4th	400 m	50.2
1949	South American Championships	Lima, Peru	5th	800 m	1:57.8
1949	South American Championships	Lima, Peru	2nd	4 × 400 m relay	3:20.1

== Personal bests ==
- 400 metres – 49.5h (1947)

== Sources ==
- Guillermo Avalos' profile at Sports Reference.com
