= Gerda Martín =

Chilean javelin thrower (1927–2024)

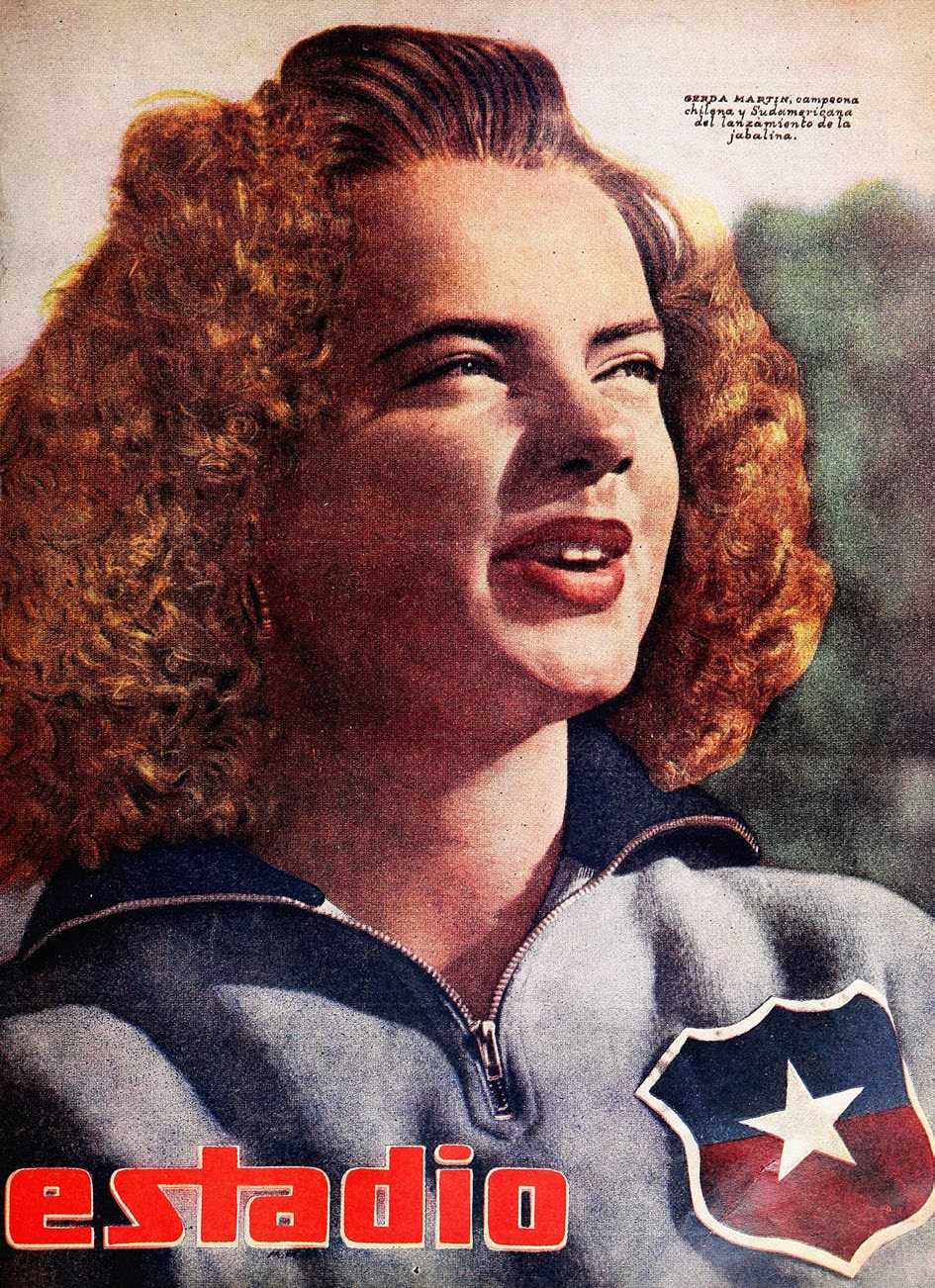

Personal information
- Full name: Gerda Irene Ema Martín Hube
- Nationality: Chilean
- Born: 5 September 1927 Osorno, Chile
- Died: 5 April 2024 (aged 96) Padre Hurtado, Chile

Sport
- Sport: Athletics
- Event: Javelin throw

Gerda Irene Ema Martín Hube (later Correa; 5 September 1927 – 5 April 2024) was a Chilean athlete. She competed in the women's javelin throw at the 1952 Summer Olympics. Martín died on 5 April 2024, at the age of 96.

== International competitions ==
Year	Competition	Venue	Position	Event	Notes
Representing Chile
1945	South American Championships	Montevideo, Uruguay	2nd	Javelin throw	36.25 m
1946	South American Championships (unofficial)	Santiago, Chile	3rd	High jump	1.45 m
1946	South American Championships (unofficial)	Santiago, Chile	1st	Javelin throw	35.78 m
1947	South American Championships	Rio de Janeiro, Brazil	1st	Javelin throw	38.22 m
1949	South American Championships	Lima, Peru	5th	High jump	1.45 m
1949	South American Championships	Lima, Peru	2nd	Javelin throw	37.39 m
1952	South American Championships	Buenos Aires, Argentina	5th	High jump	1.45 m
1952	South American Championships	Buenos Aires, Argentina	1st	Javelin throw	39.16 m
1952	Olympic Games	Helsinki, Finland	18th (q)	Javelin throw	36.94 m

== Personal bests ==
- Javelin throw – 39.16 (1952)
