= Donald Campbell (sprinter) =

American sprinter (1926–2017)

Don Campbell
Personal information
- Full name: Donald Michael Campbell
- Born: April 9, 1926 Denver, Colorado, U.S.
- Died: February 3, 2017 (aged 90) Santa Fe, New Mexico, U.S.
Medal record
Men's athletics
Representing the United States
Pan American Games
Gold medal – first place	1951 Buenos Aires	4 × 100 m relay

Donald Michael Campbell (April 9, 1926 – February 3, 2017) was an American sprinter. Campbell was born in Denver, Colorado on April 9, 1926. During World War II, he served in the Philippines as a rifleman in the U.S. Army. In June 1955, he married Shirley, in Boulder, Colorado. During his career in athletics, he was nicknamed the Colorado Comet. Campbell died in Santa Fe, New Mexico on February 3, 2017, at the age of 90.

Cambpell was an All-American sprinter for the Colorado Buffaloes track and field team, placing 3rd in the 100 meters at the 1948 NCAA track and field championships.
