= Alberto Biedermann =

Argentine sprinter (born 1926)

Alberto Biderman
Personal information
- Full name: Alberto Carlos Biderman
- Nationality: Argentine
- Born: January 24, 1926

Sport
- Sport: Track & Field
- Event: 100 metres

Albert Carlos Biderman (born 24 January 1926) is an Argentine athlete who competed in the 1948 Summer Olympics in the 4 × 100 m relay in which they finished 3rd in the first round and failed to advance.

== International competitions ==
Year	Competition	Venue	Position	Event	Notes
Representing Argentina
1948	Olympic Games	London, United Kingdom	8th (h)	4 × 100 m relay	42.4
1949	South American Championships	Lima, Peru	6th	100 m	11.2
1949	South American Championships	Lima, Peru	2nd	4 × 100 m relay	42.3
