= Ingeborg Mello =

Argentine shot putter and discus thrower (1919-2009)

Ingeborg Mello de Preiss
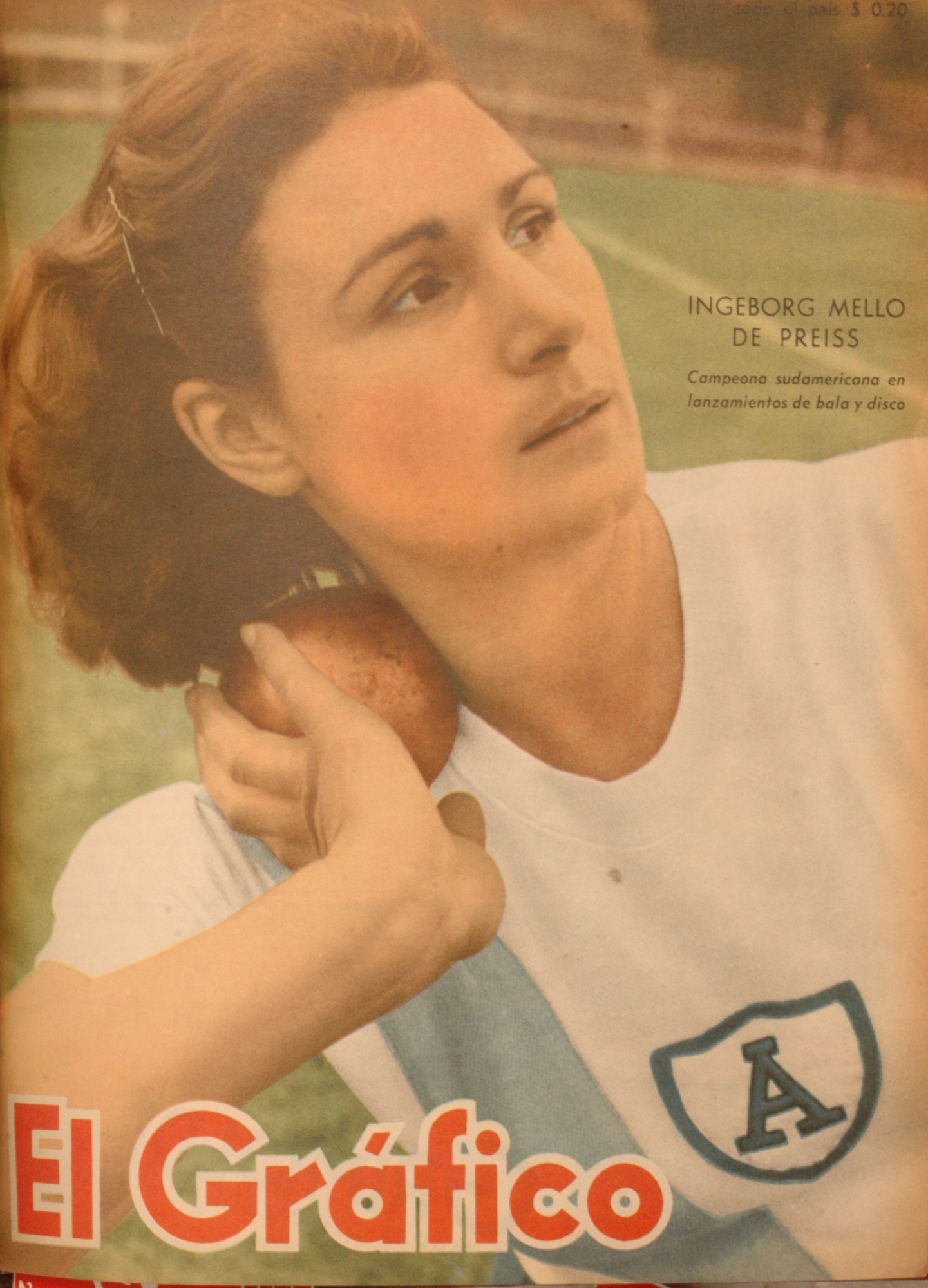
- Mello in El Gráfico, 1947

Personal information
- Born: 4 January 1919 Berlin, Germany
- Died: 25 October 2009 (aged 90)

Sport
- Country: Argentina
- Sport: Athletics
- Events: Discus throw, Shot put
- Club: San Lorenzo de Almagro

Achievements and titles
- Olympic finals: 1948 Summer Olympics, 1952 Summer Olympics

Ingeborg Mello
Medal record

Women's athletics

Representing Argentina

Pan American Games
Gold medal – first place	1951 Buenos Aires	Discus throw
Gold medal – first place	1951 Buenos Aires	Shot put

Ingeborg Mello de Preiss (January 4, 1919 – October 25, 2009) was an Argentine track and field athlete who competed mainly in the discus throw and the shot put. She represented Argentina at the 1948 and 1952 Summer Olympic Games. She won the gold medal in the women's discus throw and the shot put event at the 1951 Pan American Games in Buenos Aires, Argentina.

Born in Berlin, Germany, she was Jewish. She trained in San Lorenzo de Almagro Club in Buenos Aires.

== International competitions ==
Year	Competition	Venue	Position	Event	Notes
Representing Argentina
1941	South American Championships	Buenos Aires, Argentina	1st	Shot put	11.81 m
1941	South American Championships	Buenos Aires, Argentina	3rd	Discus throw	33.80 m
1943	South American Championships	Santiago, Chile	2nd	Shot put	10.98 m
1943	South American Championships	Santiago, Chile	2nd	Discus throw	34.60 m
1947	South American Championships	Rio de Janeiro, Brazil	1st	Shot put	11.58 m
1947	South American Championships	Rio de Janeiro, Brazil	1st	Discus throw	38.40 m
1947	South American Championships	Rio de Janeiro, Brazil	2nd	Javelin throw	36.08 m
1948	Olympic Games	London, United Kingdom	9th	Shot put	12.085 m
1948	Olympic Games	London, United Kingdom	8th	Discus throw	38.44 m
1949	South American Championships	Lima, Peru	1st	Shot put	11.58 m
1949	South American Championships	Lima, Peru	1st	Discus throw	37.36 m
1949	South American Championships	Lima, Peru	3rd	Javelin throw	36.50 m
1951	Pan American Games	Buenos Aires, Argentina	1st	Shot put	12.45 m
1951	Pan American Games	Buenos Aires, Argentina	1st	Discus throw	38.55 m
1952	South American Championships	Buenos Aires, Argentina	1st	Shot put	11.48 m
1952	South American Championships	Buenos Aires, Argentina	1st	Discus throw	40.14 m
1952	Olympic Games	Helsinki, Finland	19th (q)	Shot put	10.82 m
1952	Olympic Games	Helsinki, Finland	12th	Discus throw	39.04 m
1956	South American Championships	Santiago, Chile	7th	Shot put	10.45 m
1956	South American Championships	Santiago, Chile	3rd	Discus throw	38.08 m
1958	South American Championships	Montevideo, Uruguay	3rd	Discus throw	39.05 m
1960	Ibero-American Games	Santiago, Chile	5th	Shot put	10.91 m
1960	Ibero-American Games	Santiago, Chile	1st	Discus throw	39.34 m
1961	South American Championships	Lima, Peru	5th	Discus throw	37.22 m
1962	Ibero-American Games	Madrid, Spain	6th	Shot put	11.27 m
1962	Ibero-American Games	Madrid, Spain	6th	Discus throw	38.97 m
1963	South American Championships	Cali, Colombia	6th	Shot put	11.36 m
1963	South American Championships	Cali, Colombia	3rd	Discus throw	39.05 m
1965	South American Championships	Rio de Janeiro, Brazil	5th	Shot put	11.46 m
1965	South American Championships	Rio de Janeiro, Brazil	4th	Discus throw	39.25 m
1967	South American Championships	Buenos Aires, Argentina	5th	Discus throw	35.38 m

== Personal bests ==
- Shot put – 12.45 (Buenos Aires 1951) former NR
- Discus throw – 42.10 (Buenos Aires 1949) former NR
