= Mariano Acosta (athlete) =

Argentine sprinter

Personal information
- Born: 7 July 1930 Gualeguaychú, Entre Ríos, Argentina

Sport
- Sport: Sprinting
- Event: 100 metres

Mariano Acosta (born 7 July 1930) is an Argentine sprinter. He competed in the men's 100 metres at the 1952 Summer Olympics.

== International competitions ==
Year	Competition	Venue	Position	Event	Notes
Representing Argentina
1951	Pan American Games	Buenos Aires, Argentina	3rd	4 × 100 m relay	41.8
1952	South American Championships	Buenos Aires, Argentina	1st	4 × 100 m relay	41.4
1952	Olympic Games	Helsinki, Finland	66th (h)	100 m	11.58
1952	Olympic Games	Helsinki, Finland	7th (sf)	4 × 100 m relay	41.4

== Personal bests ==
- 100 metres – 10.6h (Rosario 1950)
