= Haroldo da Silva =

Brazilian track and field athlete

Haroldo Pereira da Silva (10 September 1929 – 24 May 1995) was a Brazilian track and field athlete who competed at the 1948 Summer Olympics in the 100 metres, 200 metres and 4 x 100 metres relay.

== Competition record ==
Year	Competition	Venue	Position	Event	Notes
Representing Brazil
1948	Olympic Gamess	London, United Kingdom	16th (qf)	100 m	11.04
1948	Olympic Gamess	London, United Kingdom	9th (sf)	200 m	22.22
1948	Olympic Gamess	London, United Kingdom	8th (h)	4 × 100 m relay	42.4
1949	South American Championships	Lima, Peru	2nd	100 m	10.7
1949	South American Championships	Lima, Peru	4th	200 m	22.9
1949	South American Championships	Lima, Peru	4th	4 × 100 m relay	43.1

== Personal bests ==
- 100 metres – 10.4h (1949)
- 200 metres – 21.8h (1948)
