= Jim Fuchs =

American discus thrower and shot putter (1927–2010)

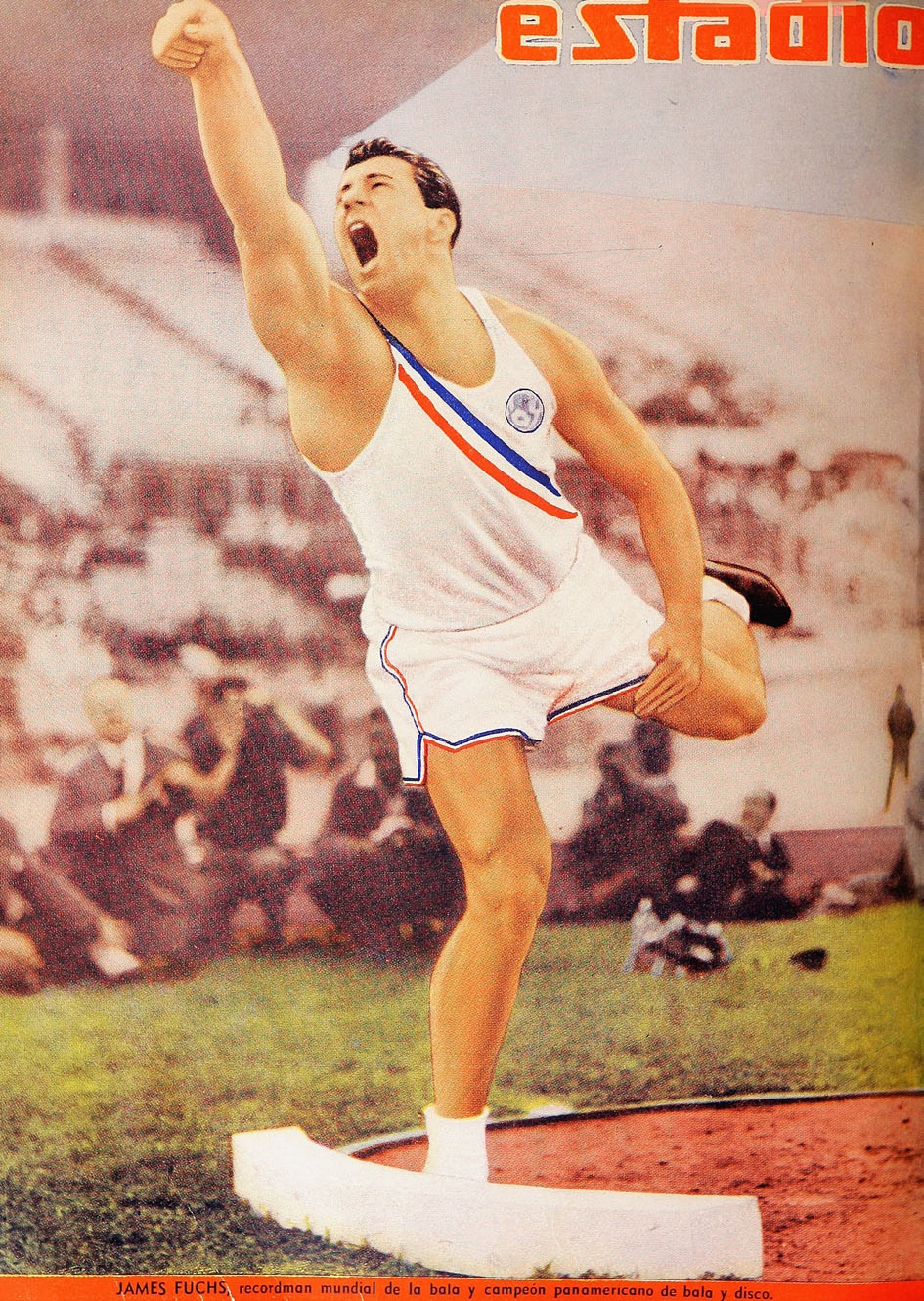
- Fuchs in 1951

Personal information
- Full name: James Emanuel Fuchs
- Born: December 6, 1927 Chicago, Illinois, U.S.
- Died: October 8, 2010 (aged 82) Manhattan, New York, U.S.
- Education: Yale University
- Height: 6 ft 2 in (187 cm)
- Weight: 223 lb (101 kg)

Sport
- Country: United States
- Sport: Athletics
- Events: Shot put, discus throw, decathlon
- Club: NYAC, New York

Achievements and titles
- Personal bests: SP – 17.95 m (1950); DT – 52.60 m (1949)
Medal record
Men's athletics
Representing the United States
Olympic Games
Bronze medal – third place	1948 London	Shot put
Bronze medal – third place	1952 Helsinki	Shot put
Pan American Games
Gold medal – first place	1951 Buenos Aires	Shot put
Gold medal – first place	1951 Buenos Aires	Discus throw

James Emanuel Fuchs (pronounced /ˈfjuːʃ/; December 6, 1927 – October 8, 2010) was an American communications executive and athlete who competed in the discus throw and shot put. Track and Field News rated him the number one shotputter in the world in the 1949–50 seasons. He developed a new shot-putting technique to compensate for a leg injury, and then used what he called "the sideways glide" to set world records and dominate the sport over a two-year span in the early 1950s. He won bronze medals in shot put at both the 1948 Summer Olympics in London and the 1952 Summer Olympics in Helsinki.

== Early years, college, new technique, Olympics ==
Fuchs was born in Chicago, Illinois, where he starred in football at Hyde Park High School (later renamed to Hyde Park Career Academy). He played football as a fullback at Yale University, but injuries kept him off the field. In track, at 215 pounds, he was able to run the 100-yard dash in less than 10 seconds, but suffered a leg injury, and his coaches finally restricted him to competing in the discus and the shot. While recovering from surgery while he was at Yale, he tried to use what was then the standard technique for the shot put but found that his injury made him unable to use that method which involved stopping before releasing the shot. He came up with a technique he called "the sideways glide" that allowed him to shot put more smoothly and without pain, while seeing a dramatic increase in distance. In subsequent years the technique he developed was widely adapted by other competitors. Fuchs' training regimen did not involve lifting weights; in a 1994 interview he suggested that had he done so he would easily have broken 60 feet, shot putting's equivalent of the four-minute mile.

Competing for Yale University, Fuchs won both the IC4A and NCAA championships in 1949 and 1950. He won the Amateur Athletic Union national outdoor titles the same years and was the AAU indoor champion for three consecutive years, from 1950 through 1952. In 1949 and 1950 he won 88 consecutive meets and set four world records, reaching his peak in a period that came between Olympic games. Fuchs set his first record at 58 feet 4 1/2 inches (17.793 m) in June 1949 in Oslo, Norway. He extended it to 58-5½ (17.82m) on April 29, 1950, in Los Angeles at a triangular track and field competition between Yale, Michigan State University and the University of Southern California; to 58-8¾ (17.90m) on August 20, 1950, at Visby, Sweden; and to 58-10¾ (17.95m) two days later at Eskilstuna, Sweden. The last mark was ratified by the International Amateur Athletics Federation in April 1951. At the Boston Athletic Association Games held in February 1950, Fuchs set an unofficial indoor record with a 16-pound shot which he heaved a distance of 57 feet, 6½ inches from the board circle, for an event that at the time of the toss was not officially tracked by the AAU in its record book.

Fuchs represented the United States at the 1948 Summer Olympics held in London, Great Britain, where he won the bronze medal in the men's shot put event, despite suffering from strep throat and a 104-degree temperature while competing. Competing in two events in athletics at the 1951 Pan American Games held in Buenos Aires, Fuchs won gold medals in both the discus and shot put. He earned himself the nickname "The Magnificent Wreck" for his willingness to compete in the face of illness and injury. As one of the favorites heading into the next Olympics, Fuchs sprained a finger in his right hand in July 1952 which left his entire hand throbbing and put him off the field for three days, in addition to an ankle injury he had sustained with while training. Despite the injuries, Fuchs repeated with his second bronze medal in the shot put at the 1952 Summer Olympics, held in Helsinki, Finland. Gold medalist Parry O'Brien later surpassed Fuchs's records with a more radical innovation which featured a 180-degree turn called the "backwards glide"; he broke the 60-foot mark in 1953.

== Post shot-put career ==
After his shot-put career, Fuchs spent 20 years as a communications executive, working for NBC, Curtis Publishing and Mutual Sports, of which he was president. Later he was the chairman and chief executive of the outplacement firm Fuchs, Cuthrell & Company.

In 1981, he co-founded, together with George Steinbrenner, the Silver Shield Foundation, after the two friends had discussed the funeral of a slain police officer that Fuchs had attended, which left him wondering how the officer's children would be taken care of following their father's death. Silver Shield was dedicated to offering financial assistance to the children of peace officers in the New York metropolitan area who were killed in the line of duty, with the initial funding for the organization coming from the revenue earned at a New York Yankees game. Fuchs became the chairman and executive director of the organization, which provided each of 900 children of victims of the September 11 terrorist attacks with $20,000 in funds to be used towards their education.

Fuchs was inducted into the USA Track & Field Hall of Fame in 2005, in recognition for his dominance of the sport in 1949 and 1950 which had him top ranked by Track & Field News for both of those seasons.

Fuchs died in Manhattan at age 82 on October 8, 2010. He was survived by his fiancée, Mary St. George, as well as by five daughters from his first marriage, two sons from his second and seven grandchildren. Both of his marriages had ended in divorce.

Records
Preceded by (United States) Charles Fonville	Men's Shot Put World Record Holder; July 28, 1949 – May 9, 1953	Succeeded by (United States) Parry O'Brien
