= Hermenelindo Alberti =

Personal information
- Nationality: Argentine
- Born: 27 February 1925 Magdalena, Argentina
- Died: 8 December 2012 (aged 87)

Sport
- Sport: Track & Field
- Event: 400m hurdles

Hermenelindo Alberti (27 February 1925 – 8 December 2012) was an Argentine athlete who competed in the 1948 Summer Olympics in the 400m hurdles and the 4 × 400 m relay, in both events he finished 3rd in the first round and failed to advance.

== International competitions ==
Year	Competition	Venue	Position	Event	Notes
Representing Argentina
1947	South American Championships	Rio de Janeiro, Brazil	2nd	400 m hurdles	54.9
1948	Olympic Games	London, United Kingdom	8th (h)	400 m hurdles	54.6
1948	Olympic Games	London, United Kingdom	9th (h)	4 × 400 m relay	3:21.2
1949	South American Championships	Lima, Peru	1st	400 m hurdles	54.7

== Personal bests ==
- 400 metres hurdles – 54.5h (1948)
