= Athletics at the 1951 Pan American Games – Men's discus throw =

Men's discus throw at the Pan American Games

The men's discus throw event at the 1951 Pan American Games was held at the Estadio Monumental in Buenos Aires on 1 March.

== Results ==
Rank	Name	Nationality	Result	Notes
1st place, gold medalist(s)	Jim Fuchs	United States	48.91	
2nd place, silver medalist(s)	Dick Doyle	United States	47.28	
3rd place, bronze medalist(s)	Elvio Porta	Argentina	44.93	
4	Hernán Haddad	Chile	44.20	
5	Emilio Malchiodi	Argentina	44.16	
6	Nadim Marreis	Brazil	43.92	
7	Karsten Brodersen	Chile	42.20	
8	Mauricio Rodríguez	Venezuela	40.85	
9	Pedro Ucke	Argentina	40.14	
	Manuel Consiglieri	Peru	DNS	
