= Athletics at the 1951 Pan American Games – Men's hammer throw =

Men's hammer throw at the Pan American Games

The men's hammer throw event at the 1951 Pan American Games was held at the Estadio Monumental in Buenos Aires on 28 February.

== Results ==
| Rank | Name | Nationality | Result | Notes |
|---|---|---|---|---|
| 1st place, gold medalist(s) | Emilio Ortiz | Argentina | 48.04 | |
| 2nd place, silver medalist(s) | Manuel Etchepare | Argentina | 46.12 | |
| 3rd place, bronze medalist(s) | Arturo Melcher | Chile | 45.70 | |
| 4 | Juan Fuse | Argentina | 45.35 | |
| 5 | Gil Borjeson | United States | 43.78 | |
| 6 | Vicente Lagoyete | Colombia | 38.73 | |
| | Manuel Consiglieri | Peru | DNS | |
| | Julio Bordas | Cuba | DNS | |
