= Athletics at the 1951 Pan American Games – Men's shot put =

Men's shot put at the Pan American Games

The men's shot put event at the 1951 Pan American Games was held at the Estadio Monumental in Buenos Aires on 2 March.

== Results ==
Rank	Name	Nationality	Result	Notes
1st place, gold medalist(s)	Jim Fuchs	United States	17.25	
2nd place, silver medalist(s)	Juan Kahnert	Argentina	14.27	
3rd place, bronze medalist(s)	Nadim Marreis	Brazil	14.07	
4	Julián Llorente	Argentina	13.55	
5	Gerardo de Villiers	Cuba	13.50	
6	Fernando Ferrera	Argentina	12.73	
7	Mauricio Rodríguez	Venezuela	11.97	
	Dick Doyle	United States	DNS	
	Hernán Figueroa	Chile	DNS	
