= Athletics at the 1955 Pan American Games – Men's discus throw =

Men's discus throw at the Pan American Games

The men's discus throw event at the 1955 Pan American Games was held at the Estadio Universitario in Mexico City on 15 March.

== Results ==
Rank	Name	Nationality	Result	Notes
1st place, gold medalist(s)	Fortune Gordien	United States	53.10	GR
2nd place, silver medalist(s)	Parry O'Brien	United States	51.07	
3rd place, bronze medalist(s)	Hernán Haddad	Chile	47.14	
4	Pedro Ucke	Argentina	42.99	
5	Mauricio Rodríguez	Venezuela	40.78	
6	John Pavelich	Canada	37.57	
	Rodolfo Sedas	Mexico	NM	
	Elvio Porta	Argentina	DNS	
	Rafer Johnson	United States	DNS	
