= Delfo Cabrera =

Argentine athlete (1919–1981)

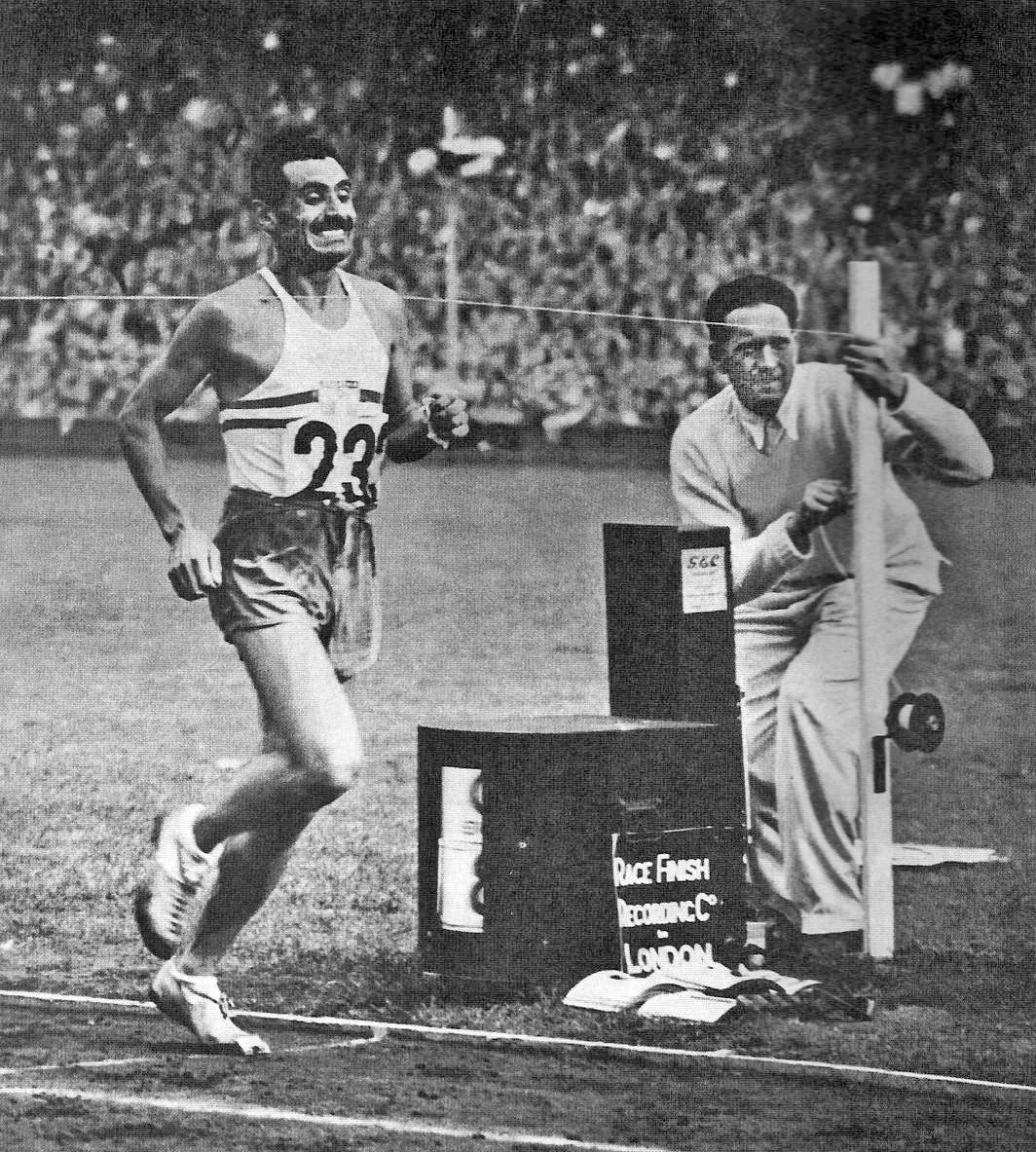
- Cabrera in 1948

Personal information
- Full name: Delfor Cabrera Gómez
- Born: April 2, 1919 Armstrong, Argentina
- Died: August 2, 1981 (aged 62) Alberti, Argentina
- Height: 1.72 m (5 ft 8 in)
- Weight: 59 kg (130 lb)
Medal record
Men's athletics
Representing Argentina
Olympic Games
Gold medal – first place	1948 London	Marathon
Pan American Games
Gold medal – first place	1951 Buenos Aires	Marathon

Delfor "Delfo" Cabrera Gómez (April 2, 1919 – August 2, 1981) was an Argentine athlete, winner of the marathon race at the 1948 Summer Olympics in one of the most dramatic finishes in athletics history.

== Biography ==
Born in Armstrong, Santa Fe Province, Delfo played football as a youth, but decided to turn to athletics after Juan Carlos Zabala's triumph at the 1932 Summer Olympics.

He moved to Buenos Aires in 1938 and began training in San Lorenzo de Almagro under Francisco Mura. In the same year, he won his first national championships title (in 5000 m). Over the years he would win 9 more titles, but none of them in marathon.

Delfo served in the army during the World War II where he met Juan Perón. After the war, being a friend of Perón, he was active member of the Justicialist Party.

The London Olympic Games was Cabrera's first major international competition. Etienne Gailly from Belgium dominated the marathon race most of the way and until almost the very last moments. He was the first to enter the stadium, but with 400 m to go, Gailly fell down, exhausted, got up and fell again. It was like Dorando Pietri's dramatic finish 40 years before. Cabrera and Tom Richards of Great Britain managed to pass the staggering Gailly, Delfo winning 16.0 seconds ahead of Richards.

For 64 years, the victory remained the last Argentinian gold medal in an individual competition, until the victory of Sebastián Crismanich in taekwondo in the 2012 games.

Cabrera also participated in the 1952 Summer Olympics and was the flag bearer for Argentina at the opening ceremony; he finished in sixth place in the marathon, which was won by Emil Zátopek. Cabrera ended his athletics career after finishing sixth at the 1954 Boston Marathon. After that he taught physical education in several schools.

Delfo died in a car accident near the town of Alberti, Buenos Aires province, when driving back to Buenos Aires from a reception in his honour at Lincoln.

== International competitions ==
Year	Competition	Venue	Position	Event	Notes
Representing Argentina
1941	South American Championships	Buenos Aires, Argentina	3rd	3000 m	8:48.0
1943	South American Championships	Santiago, Chile	3rd	3000 m	8:44.6
1943	South American Championships	Santiago, Chile	3rd	5000 m	15:11.0
1943	South American Championships	Santiago, Chile	3rd	10,000 m	31:36.8
1945	South American Championships	Montevideo, Uruguay	3rd	3000 m	8:48.8
1945	South American Championships	Montevideo, Uruguay	4th	5000 m	15:28.2
1946	South American Championships (unofficial)	Santiago, Chile	2nd	3000 m	8:47.7
1946	South American Championships (unofficial)	Santiago, Chile	1st	10,000 m	32:35.0
1947	South American Championships	Rio de Janeiro, Brazil	3rd	3000 m	8:46.9
1947	South American Championships	Rio de Janeiro, Brazil	5th	5000 m	NT
1947	South American Championships	Rio de Janeiro, Brazil	3rd	10,000 m	33:19.0
1948	Olympic Games	London, United Kingdom	1st	Marathon	2:34:51.6
1949	South American Championships	Lima, Peru	4th	5000 m	15:19.8
1949	South American Championships	Lima, Peru	1st	20 km	1:06:52
1951	Pan American Games	Buenos Aires, Argentina	1st	Marathon	2:35:01
1952	South American Championships	Buenos Aires, Argentina	1st	10,000 m	31:05.7
1952	South American Championships	Buenos Aires, Argentina	1st	Half marathon	1:09:19
1952	Olympic Games	Helsinki, Finland	6th	Marathon	2:26:42.4

== Personal bests ==
- Marathon – 2:26:43 (Helsinki 1952)
