= Enrique Kistenmacher =

Argentine decathlete

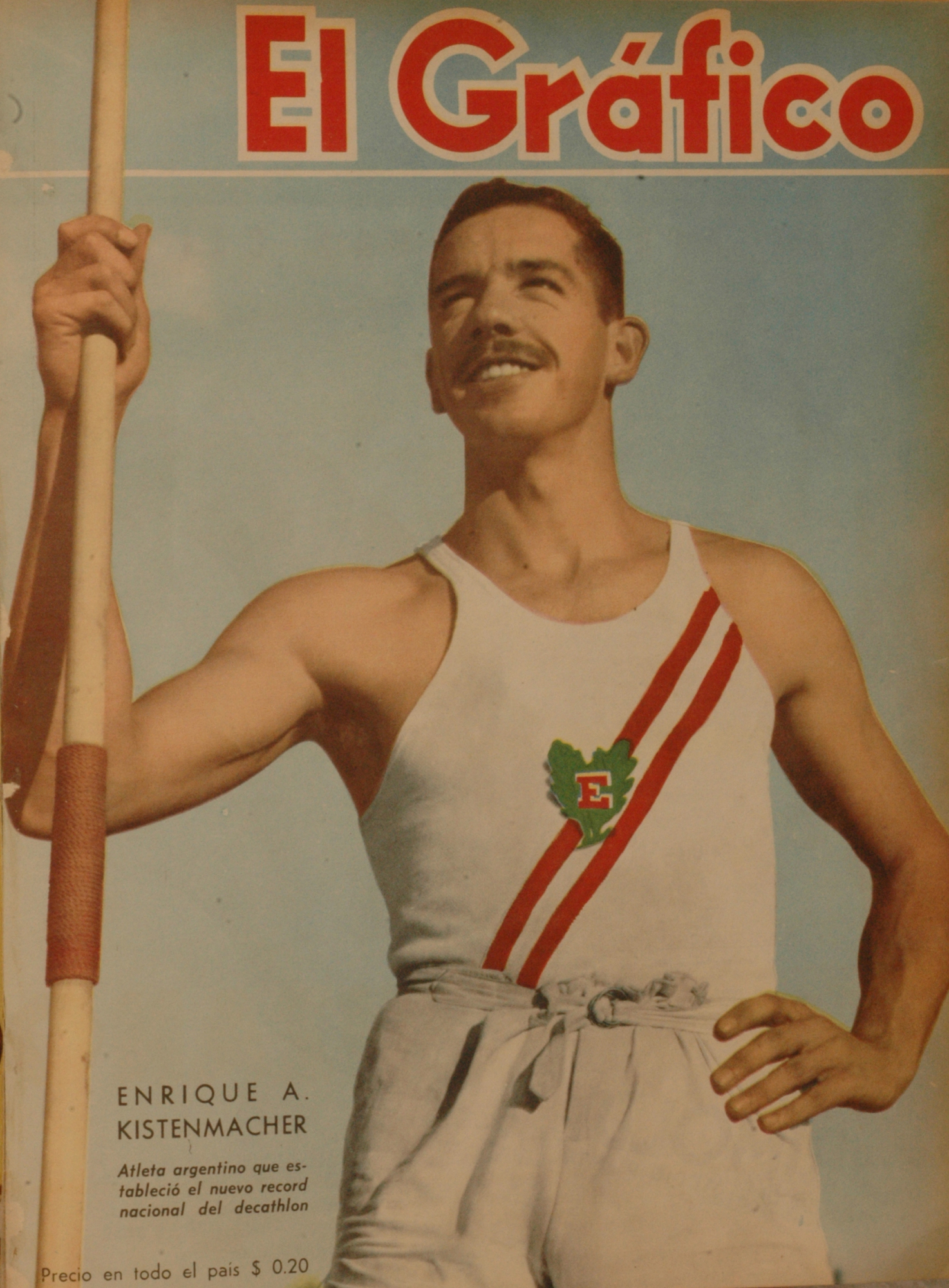
- Kistenmacher in 1947

Personal information
- Full name: Enrique Alberto Kistenmacher
- Born: 4 April 1923 Concepción, Tucumán, Argentina
- Died: 11 February 1990 (aged 66)
- Height: 1.80 cm (1 in)
- Weight: 75 kg (165 lb)

Sport
- Sport: Athletics
- Event: Decathlon

Enrique Alberto Kistenmacher (4 April 1923 – 11 February 1990) was an Argentine decathlete. At the 1948 Summer Olympics he finished fourth in decathlon and tenth in long jump. He became South American decathlon champion in 1947 and 1949. In long jump he became South American champion in 1949 and won the bronze medal in 1947.

== International competitions ==
Year	Competition	Venue	Position	Event	Notes
Representing Argentina
1947	South American Championships	Rio de Janeiro, Brazil	3rd	Long jump	7.07 m
1947	South American Championships	Rio de Janeiro, Brazil	1st	Decathlon	7011 pts
1948	Olympic Games	London, United Kingdom	10th	Long jump	6.80 m
1948	Olympic Games	London, United Kingdom	4th	Decathlon	6929 pts
1949	South American Championships	Lima, Peru	1st	Long jump	7.37 m
1949	South American Championships	Lima, Peru	1st	Decathlon	6853 pts
1951	Pan American Games	Buenos Aires, Argentina	–	Decathlon	DNF
1952	South American Championships	Buenos Aires, Argentina	2nd	4 × 400 m relay	3:18.0

== Personal bests ==
- Long jump – 7.365 (1949)
- Decathlon – 6688 (1949)
