= Guillermo Evans =

Personal information
- Full name: Guillermo Armando Evans
- Born: April 27, 1923 Córdoba Argentina
- Died: November 1, 1981 (aged 58) Resistencia, Argentina

Sport
- Sport: Track & Field
- Events: 400m & 4x400m relay

Guillermo Armando Evans (April 27, 1923 – November 1, 1981) was an Argentine athlete who competed in the 1948 Summer Olympics in the 400m and 4x400m relay, but he failed to advance past the first round in either event.

== International competitions ==
Year	Competition	Venue	Position	Event	Notes
Representing Argentina
1947	South American Championships	Rio de Janeiro, Brazil	5th	400 m	NT
1947	South American Championships	Rio de Janeiro, Brazil	1st	4 × 400 m relay	3:16.0
1948	Olympic Games	London, United Kingdom	47th (h)	400 m	51.8
1948	Olympic Games	London, United Kingdom	9th (h)	4 × 400 m relay	3:21.2
1949	South American Championships	Lima, Peru	5th	400 m	50.3
1949	South American Championships	Lima, Peru	2nd	4 × 400 m relay	3:20.1
1951	Pan American Games	Buenos Aires, Argentina	10th (sf)	400 m	50.8

== Personal bests ==
- 400 metres – 48.8h (1947)
