= Melânia Luz =

Brazilian sprinter

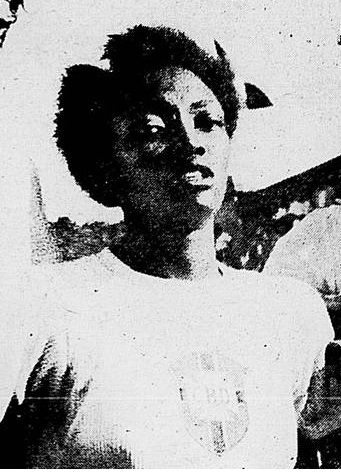

Personal information
- Full name: Melânia Luz dos Santos
- Nationality: Brazilian
- Born: 1 June 1928
- Died: 22 June 2016 (aged 88)

Sport
- Sport: Sprinting
- Event: 200 metres

Melânia Luz dos Santos (1 June 1928 – 22 June 2016) was a Brazilian sprinter. She competed in the women's 200 metres at the 1948 Summer Olympics.

== International competitions ==
Year	Competition	Venue	Position	Event	Notes
Representing Brazil
1947	South American Championships	Rio de Janeiro, Brazil	3rd	100 m	12.8
1947	South American Championships	Rio de Janeiro, Brazil	2nd	200 m	26.6
1947	South American Championships	Rio de Janeiro, Brazil	2nd	4 × 100 m relay	50.3
1948	Olympic Games	London, United Kingdom	4th (h)	200 m	26.6e
1948	Olympic Games	London, United Kingdom	8th (h)	4 × 100 m relay	49.0
1949	South American Championships	Lima, Peru	5th	100 m	13.3
1949	South American Championships	Lima, Peru	2nd	200 m	25.9
1949	South American Championships	Lima, Peru	1st	4 × 100 m relay	49.2
1949	South American Championships	Lima, Peru	6th	Long jump	5.095 m
1953	South American Championships (unofficial)	Santiago, Chile	1st	4 × 100 m relay	48.2 s
1954	South American Championships	São Paulo, Brazil	5th (h)	100 m	12.5
1954	South American Championships	São Paulo, Brazil	4th	200 m	26.5
1954	South American Championships	São Paulo, Brazil	2nd	4 × 100 m relay	48.5
1958	South American Championships	Montevideo, Uruguay	4th	200 m	26.2
1958	South American Championships	Montevideo, Uruguay	1st	4 × 100 m relay	48.7

== Personal bests ==
- 100 metres – 12.8h (1947)
- 200 metres – 25.9h (1948)
