= Arturo Melcher =

Chilean hammer thrower

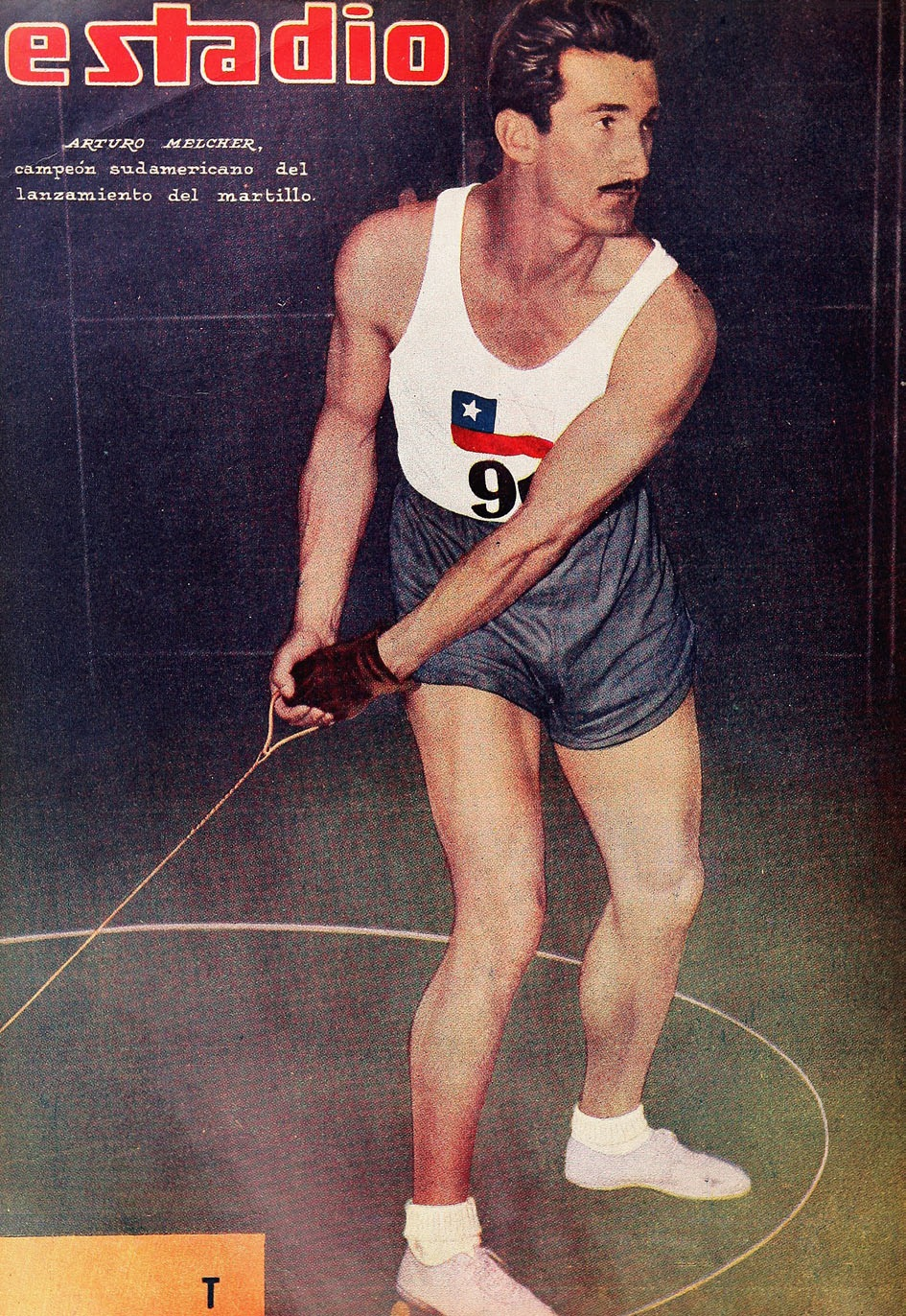
- Arturo Melcher in 1952

Personal information
- Full name: Arturo Melcher Borquez
- Nationality: Chilean
- Born: 11 November 1921 Loncoche, Chile
- Died: 7 August 2008 (aged 86)
- Height: 1.86 m (6 ft 1 in)
- Weight: 86 kg (190 lb)

Sport
- Sport: Athletics
- Event: Hammer throw
- Retired: 1961

Arturo Melcher Borquez (11 November 1921 – 7 August 2008) was a Chilean hammer thrower. He competed at the 1951 Pan American Games in the men's hammer throw event, winning the bronze medal. He then won a gold medal at the 1952 South American Championships and later competed in the men's hammer throw event at the 1952 Summer Olympics.

Before specialising to athletics he also practised football and boxing.

His personal best in the hammer was 52.61 metres set in 1955.

== International competitions ==
Year	Competition	Venue	Position	Event	Notes
Representing Chile
1951	Pan American Games	Buenos Aires, Argentina	3rd	Hammer throw	45.70 m
1952	South American Championships	Buenos Aires, Argentina	1st	Hammer throw	50.75 m
1952	Olympic Games	Helsinki, Finland	32nd (q)	Hammer throw	45.55 m
1953	South American Championships (unofficial)	Santiago, Chile	1st	Hammer throw	49.14 m
1954	South American Championships	São Paulo, Brazil	3rd	Hammer throw	49.47 m
1955	Pan American Games	Mexico City, Mexico	5th	Hammer throw	49.60 m
1956	South American Championships	Santiago, Chile	5th	Hammer throw	49.58 m
1957	South American Championships (unofficial)	Santiago, Chile	2nd	Hammer throw	51.44 m
1958	South American Championships	Montevideo, Uruguay	5th	Hammer throw	50.19 m
1959	South American Championships (unofficial)	São Paulo, Brazil	4th	Hammer throw	45.41 m
