= John Voight (athlete) =

American sprinter

Personal information
- Full name: John Wesley Voight Jr.
- Born: September 22, 1926
- Died: June 9, 1993 (aged 66)
Medal record
Men's athletics
Representing the United States
Pan American Games
Gold medal – first place	1951 Buenos Aires	4 × 100 m relay
Gold medal – first place	1951 Buenos Aires	4 × 400 m relay

John Wesley Voight Jr. (September 22, 1926 – June 9, 1993) was an American sprinter. Voight was a Maryland native, and lived in various towns across the state his entire life.

Voight also won the 1951 USA Outdoor Track and Field Championships in the all-around decathlon.
