= Rosalvo Ramos =

Brazilian sprinter

Personal information
- Full name: Rosalvo da Costa Ramos
- Nationality: Brazilian
- Born: 6 June 1914 Rio de Janeiro, Brazil
- Died: 13 July 1966 (aged 52) Rio de Janeiro, Brazil

Sport
- Sport: Sprinting
- Event: 200 metres

Rosalvo da Costa Ramos (6 June 1914 – 13 July 1966) was a Brazilian sprinter. He competed in the men's 200 metres at the 1948 Summer Olympics.

== International competitions ==
Year	Competition	Venue	Position	Event	Notes
Representing Brazil
1941	South American Championships	Buenos Aires, Argentina	1st	400 m	50.2
1945	South American Championships	Montevideo, Uruguay	3rd	400 m	49.4
1945	South American Championships	Montevideo, Uruguay	1st	4 × 400 m relay	3:16.5
1946	South American Championships (unofficial)	Santiago, Chile	3rd	400 m	49.2
1947	South American Championships	Rio de Janeiro, Brazil	8th (h)	400 m	51.1
1947	South American Championships	Rio de Janeiro, Brazil	3rd	4 × 400 m relay	3:19.9
1948	Olympic Games	London, United Kingdom	6th (qf)	200 m	NT
1948	Olympic Games	London, United Kingdom	10th (sf)	400 m	49.23
1948	Olympic Games	London, United Kingdom	8th (h)	4 × 100 m relay	42.4
1949	South American Championships	Lima, Peru	2nd	400 m	49.8
1949	South American Championships	Lima, Peru	1st	4 × 400 m relay	3:19.7

== Personal bests ==
- 100 metres – 48.4h (1948]]
