= Hugo Nutini =

Professor of anthropology (1928–2013)

Hugo Gino Nutini (1928–2013) was an Italian-born Chilean and subsequently American professor of anthropology. He specialized in Mesoamerican studies.

== Biography ==
Before his scientific career, Nutini was a noted middle-distance runner winning the gold medal in the 1500 metres at the 1949 South American Championships in Athletics. He was set to compete at the 1952 Summer Olympics in Helsinki but was a non-starter.

Nutini received a bachelor's degree in civil engineering from the Chilean Naval Academy. He attended UCLA and earned a second bachelor's degree this time in philosophy. He then completed a master's degree in philosophy in 1958. He was drafted into the United States Army, serving two years in Korea and Japan. When he returned he switched disciplines and began studying anthropology, still at UCLA. As part of his studies he was sent to Mexico. He chose to conduct research on marriage and family structure at San Bernardino Contla. He was awarded his PhD in 1962.

Nutini taught at Los Angeles State College, the University of Southern California, the University of Puerto Rico and George Washington University. He joined the anthropology department at the University of Pittsburgh in 1963. When the Center for Latin American Studies at the University was created the next year, he became one of the first members. He advanced eventually reaching University Professor in 1986.

Nutini used field stations in the states of Puebla, Tlaxcala, and Veracruz to train US and Mexican graduate students.

== Controversy ==
Nutini became a consultant for Project Camelot, a counterinsurgency study by the United States Army. Nutini visited Chile and while there discussed Project Camelot with a number of social scientists. He tried to interest them in the project by stating it was funded by the National Science Foundation rather than the military. However, the Norwegian sociologist Johan Galtung was in Chile and had already shared information about the project including its military backing. Nutini was publicly accused of lying. A special session of the Chilean Senate was called and Camelot was denounced. The scandal led to Nutini being banned from entry to Chile as a "politically undesirable individual". Furthermore the US ambassador to Chile, Ralph A. Dungan, received protests but did not even know about the program. The negative publicity led to the cancellation of the project.

== Bibliography ==
- Nutini, Hugo G.; Roberts, John M. (April 1, 1993). Bloodsucking Witchcraft: An Epistemological Study of Anthropomorphic Supernaturalism in Rural Tlaxcala. University of Arizona Press. ISBN 9780816511976.
- Nutini, Hugo G. (July 1, 2004). The Mexican Aristocracy: An Expressive Ethnography, 1910-2000. University of Texas Press. ISBN 9780292701618.
- Nutini, Hugo G.; Nutini, Jean F. (January 1, 2014). Native Evangelism in Central Mexico. University of Texas Press. ISBN 9780292744127.
- Nutini, Hugo G.; Isaac, Barry L. (June 1, 2009). Social Stratification in Central Mexico, 1500-2000. University of Texas Press. ISBN 9780292719446.
- Nutini, Hugo G. (March 21, 1988). Todos Santos in Rural Tlaxcala: A Syncretic, Expressive, and Symbolic Analysis of the Cult of the Dead. Princeton University Press. ISBN 9780691077550.
- Nutini, Hugo G. (April 27, 1995). The Wages of Conquest: The Mexican Aristocracy in the Context of Western Aristocracies. University of Michigan Press. ISBN 9780472104840.
