= 1949 South American Championships in Athletics =

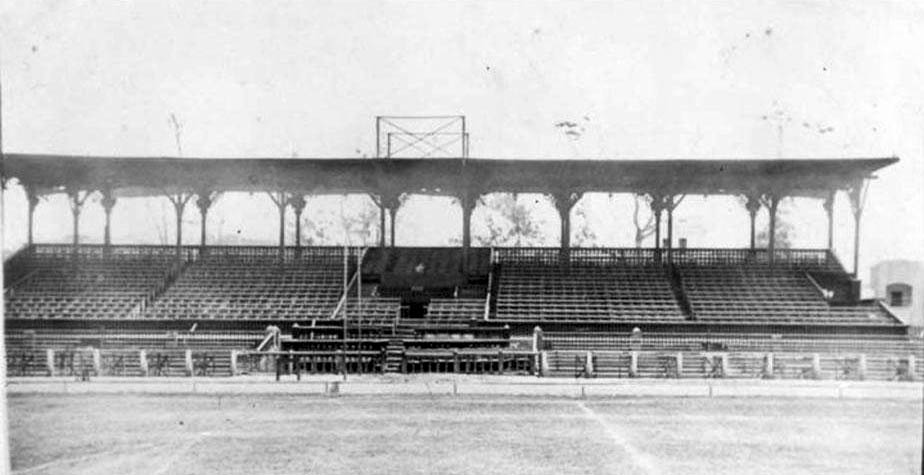
- Dates: 16–24 April
- Host city: Lima, Peru
- Venue: Estadio Nacional
- Events: 32
- Participation: 7 nations

The 1949 South American Championships in Athletics were held at the Estadio Nacional in the Peruvian capital, Lima, between 16 and 24 April.

It was the last edition to feature flat 3000 metres and cross-country running events.

== Medal summary ==
=== Men's events ===
Event	Gold		Silver		Bronze	
100 metres	Gerardo Salazar; Peru	10.7	Aroldo da Silva; Brazil	10.7	Mario Fayos; Uruguay	10.8
200 metres	Mario Fayos; Uruguay	21.7	Fernando Lapuente; Argentina	22.2	Alberto Triulzi; Argentina	22.5
400 metres	Gustavo Ehlers; Chile	49.5	Rosalvo Ramos; Brazil	49.8	Antonio Pocovi; Argentina	50.0
800 metres	Hugo Ponce; Argentina	1:56.6	Nilo Riveros; Argentina	1:56.8	Agenor da Silva; Brazil	1:57.2
1500 metres	Hugo Nutini; Chile	4:01.2	Melchor Palmeiro; Argentina	4:02.5	Oscar Gauharou; Argentina	4:03.3
3000 metres	Raúl Inostroza; Chile	8:49.2	Melchor Palmeiro; Argentina	8:50.3	Oscar Moreira; Uruguay	8:50.6
5000 metres	Ricardo Bralo; Argentina	15:02.8	Oscar Moreira; Uruguay	15:04.7	Raúl Inostroza; Chile	15:18.8
10,000 metres	Ricardo Bralo; Argentina	31:46.3	Pedro Caffa; Argentina	31:47.2	Oscar Moreira; Uruguay	31:48.0
20 kilometre race	Delfo Cabrera; Argentina	1:06:52	Oscar Moreira; Uruguay	1:07:02	Eusebio Guiñez; Argentina	1:09:11
110 metres hurdles	Alberto Triulzi; Argentina	14.5 CR	Manuel Aldunate; Chile	14.9	Wilson Carneiro; Brazil	14.9
400 metres hurdles	Hermelindo Alberti; Argentina	54.7	Víctor Henríquez; Chile	55.4	Carlos Hey; Brazil	55.5
4 × 100 metres relay	Peru; Gerardo Salazar; Miguel León Pizzarro; Santiago Ferrando; Máximo Reyes	42.3	Argentina; Gerardo Bönnhoff; Fernando Lapuente; Alberto Biedermann; Adelio Márquez	42.3	Chile; Alberto Labarthe; Carlos Silva; Raúl Dassori; Rodolfo López	42.5
4 × 400 metres relay	Brazil; João de Oliveira; Argemiro Roque; Rosalvo Ramos; Agenor da Silva	3:19.7	Argentina; Guillermo Evans; Julio Ferreyra; Guillermo Avalos; Antonio Pocovi	3:20.1	Chile; Víctor Henríquez; Reinaldo Müller; Gustavo Ehlers; Hugo Nutini	3:24.5
Cross country	Adán Zárate; Peru	36:51.4	Oscar Moreira; Uruguay	36:53.7	Pedro Caffa; Argentina	36:56.0
High jump	Hércules Azcune; Uruguay	1.90	Geraldo de Oliveira; Brazil	1.85	Alfredo Jadresic; Chile	1.85
Pole vault	Eduardo Montes de Oca; Argentina	3.90	Luis Ganoza; Peru	3.90	Sinibaldo Gerbasi; Brazil	3.80
Long jump	Enrique Kistenmacher; Argentina	7.37 =CR	Carlos Vera; Chile	7.11	Máximo Reyes; Peru	7.04
Triple jump	Hélio da Silva; Brazil	15.26 CR	Geraldo de Oliveira; Brazil	15.03	Adhemar da Silva; Brazil	14.79
Shot put	Julián Llorente; Argentina	14.44	Nadim Marreis; Brazil	14.29	Juan Kahnert; Argentina	14.25
Discus throw	Emilio Malchiodi; Argentina	45.07	Karsten Brödersen; Chile	44.76	Manuel Consiglieri; Peru	44.14
Hammer throw	Edmundo Zúñiga; Chile	50.67	Emilio Ortiz; Argentina	48.22	Manuel Etchepare; Argentina	48.09
Javelin throw	Ricardo Héber; Argentina	65.56 AR	Horst Walter; Argentina	60.17	Efraín Santibáñez; Chile	57.59
Decathlon	Enrique Kistenmacher; Argentina	6853	Hércules Azcune; Uruguay	6205	Eduardo Julve; Peru	6048

=== Women's events ===
Event	Gold		Silver		Bronze	
100 metres	Julia Sánchez; Peru	12.7	Adriana Millard; Chile	12.8	Benedicta de Oliveira; Brazil	12.8
200 metres	Adriana Millard; Chile	25.8 =AR	Melania Luz; Brazil	25.9	Benedicta de Oliveira; Brazil	26.5
80 metres hurdles	Wanda dos Santos; Brazil	11.7	Marion Huber; Chile	12.2	Eliana Gaete; Chile	12.3
4 × 100 metres relay	Brazil; Lucila Pini; Elizabeth Müller; Benedita de Oliveira; Melânia Luz	49.2 CR	Chile; Adriana Millard; Annegret Weller; Teresa Venegas; Eliana Gaete	50.8	Argentina; Lilia Menéndez; Nélida Cajide; Irma Lavaglia; Teresa Carvajal	51.0
High jump	Elizabeth Müller; Brazil	1.55	Lelia Spuhr; Argentina	1.50	Hilda Lassen; Brazil	1.50
Long jump	Wanda dos Santos; Brazil	5.53 CR	Adriana Millard; Chile	5.42	Hilda Yamasaki; Peru	5.39
Shot put	Ingeborg Mello; Argentina	11.58	Elizabeth Müller; Brazil	11.29	Haydeé Valet; Argentina	11.12
Discus throw	Ingeborg Mello; Argentina	37.36	Zita Brandt; Chile	36.28	Ingeborg Pfüller; Argentina	36.05
Javelin throw	Estrella Puente; Uruguay	37.74	Gerda Martín; Chile	37.39	Ingeborg Mello; Argentina	36.50

== Medal table ==
Rank	Nation	Gold	Silver	Bronze	Total
1	Argentina (ARG)	14	10	11	35
2	Brazil (BRA)	6	7	8	21
3	Chile (CHI)	5	10	6	21
4	Peru (PER)	4	1	4	9
5	Uruguay (URU)	3	4	3	10
Totals (5 entries)		32	32	32	96

== Team scores ==
Rank	Country	Combined	Men	Women
1	Argentina	322.5	265.5	57
2	Chile	204.5	135.5	69
3	Brazil	201	112	89
4	Peru	117	88	29
5	Uruguay	80	70	10
6	Ecuador	6	6	0
7	Venezuela	0	0	0
