= 1947 South American Championships in Athletics =

- Dates: 26 April – 4 May
- Host city: Rio de Janeiro, Brazil
- Venue: Estádio de Laranjeiras
- Events: 32
- Participation: 5 nations

The 1947 South American Championships in Athletics were held at the Estádio de Laranjeiras in Rio de Janeiro, Brazil, between 26 April and 4 May. As the stadium used for these Championships was converted from a football-specific one, the track was only 320 metres long, the last time this happened at South American Championships.

== Medal summary ==
=== Men's events ===
Event	Gold		Silver		Bronze	
100 metres	Gerardo Bönnhoff; Argentina	11.0	Santiago Ferrando; Peru	11.2	Carlos Isaack; Argentina	11.3
200 metres	Alberto Triulzi; Argentina	22.0	Gerardo Bönnhoff; Argentina	22.3	Alberto Labarthe; Chile	22.4
400 metres	Gustavo Ehlers; Chile	49.0	Antonio Pocovi; Argentina	49.2	Guillermo Avalos; Argentina	49.5
800 metres	Adán Torres; Argentina	1:53.7 CR	Nilo Riveros; Argentina	1:54.3	Alfonso Rozas; Chile	1:54.9
1500 metres	Melchor Palmeiro; Argentina	3:57.8	Nilo Riveros; Argentina	4:00.1	Raúl Inostroza; Chile	4:01.7
3000 metres	Ricardo Bralo; Argentina	8:44.3	Raúl Inostroza; Chile	8:45.0	Delfo Cabrera; Argentina	8:46.9
5000 metres	Raúl Inostroza; Chile	15:07.8	Eusebio Guiñez; Argentina	15:14.0	Sebastião Monteiro; Brazil	15:15.2
10,000 metres	João Oitica; Brazil	33:01.2	Sebastião Monteiro; Brazil	33:17.6	Delfo Cabrera; Argentina	33:19.0
Road race	Armando Sensini; Argentina	1:56:23	Eusebio Guiñez; Argentina	1:57:17	Joaquín da Silva; Brazil	1:59:00
110 metres hurdles	Alberto Triulzi; Argentina	14.7 =CR	Hélio Pereira; Brazil	15.3	Jorge Undurraga; Chile	15.4
400 metres hurdles	Sergio Guzmán; Chile	54.8	Hermelindo Alberti; Argentina	54.9	Víctor Henríquez; Chile	55.2
4 × 100 metres relay	Argentina; Carlos Isaack; Alberto Triulzi; Gerardo Bönnhoff; Adelio Márquez	42.3	Uruguay; Walter Pérez; Mario Fayos; Lorenzo Giordano; Juan López Testa	42.9	Brazil; Rui Lima; Osmar Bruno; Geraldo da Luz; Guilherme Puschnik	43.5
4 × 400 metres relay	Argentina; Rodolfo Carrera; Guillermo Evans; Guillermo Avalos; Antonio Pocovi	3:16.0 CR	Chile; Jaime Itlman; Jorge Ehlers; Sergio Guzmán; Gustavo Ehlers	3:17.0	Brazil; Benedito Ribeiro; Osmar Romano; Rosalvo Ramos; Bernard Blower	3:19.9
Cross country	Sebastião Monteiro; Brazil	37:28.9	Reinaldo Gorno; Argentina	38:39.0	Manuel Díaz; Chile	38:48.0
High jump	Alfredo Jadresic; Chile	1.91	Francisco Moura; Brazil	1.91	Carlos Altamirano; Chile	1.88
Pole vault	Lúcio de Castro; Brazil	3.90	Federico Horn; Chile	3.80	Sinibaldo Gerbasi; Brazil	3.80
Long jump	Francisco Moura; Brazil	7.10	Guillermo Dyer; Peru	7.08	Enrique Kistenmacher; Argentina	7.07
Triple jump	Geraldo de Oliveira; Brazil	15.16	Carlos Vera; Chile	15.03	Juan Gallo; Chile	14.33
Shot put	Emilio Malchiodi; Argentina	14.30	Nadim Marreis; Brazil	14.05	Julián Llorente; Argentina	13.94
Discus throw	Karsten Brödersen; Chile	45.24	Eduardo Julve; Peru	44.07	Emilio Malchiodi; Argentina	43.92
Hammer throw	Edmundo Zúñiga; Chile	49.07	Juan Fusé; Argentina	47.95	Dário Tavares; Brazil	45.97
Javelin throw	Ricardo Héber; Argentina	59.59	Lúcio de Castro; Brazil	57.37	Efraín Santibáñez; Chile	56.59
Decathlon	Enrique Kistenmacher; Argentina	7011	Eduardo Julve; Peru	6460	Raimundo Rodrigues; Brazil	6328

=== Women's events ===
Event	Gold		Silver		Bronze	
100 metres	Noemí Simonetto; Argentina	12.4 =CR	Anegret Weller; Chile	12.7	Melania Luz; Brazil	12.8
200 metres	Anegret Weller; Chile	26.6	Melania Luz; Brazil	26.6	Adriana Millard; Chile	27.1
80 metres hurdles	Noemí Simonetto; Argentina	11.5 CR	Wanda dos Santos; Brazil	12.1	María Spuhr; Argentina	12.2
4 × 100 metres relay	Argentina; Alicia Gómez; María Spuhr; Nélida Cajide; Noemi Simonetto	49.9	Brazil; Stella Ardinghi; Melânia Luz; Lucila Pini; Helena de Menezes	50.3	Chile; Lucy Lake; Norma Díaz; Adriana Millard; Annegret Weller	50.5
High jump	Ilse Barends; Chile	1.60 CR	Noemí Simonetto; Argentina	1.55	Alice Willhöft; Brazil	1.45
Long jump	Noemí Simonetto; Argentina	5.40	Wanda dos Santos; Brazil	5.16	Eliana Gaete; Chile	5.13
Shot put	Ingeborg Mello; Argentina	11.58	Edith Klempau; Chile	11.27	Elma Klempau; Chile	11.11
Discus throw	Ingeborg Mello; Argentina	38.40 CR	Elma Klempau; Chile	36.49	Noemia Assunção; Brazil	34.02
Javelin throw	Gerda Martín; Chile	38.22	Ingeborg Mello; Argentina	36.08	Ursula Holle; Chile	35.87

== Medal table ==
Rank	Nation	Gold	Silver	Bronze	Total
1	Argentina (ARG)	18	11	8	37
2	Chile (CHI)	9	7	14	30
3	Brazil (BRA)	5	9	10	24
4	Peru (PER)	0	4	0	4
5	Uruguay (URU)	0	1	0	1
Totals (5 entries)		32	32	32	96
