= Brazil at the 1936 Summer Olympics =

- IOC code: BRA
- NOC: Brazilian Olympic Committee

in Berlin
- Competitors: 73 (67 men, 6 women) in 9 sports
- Flag bearer: Sylvio de Magalhães Padilha
- Medals: Gold 0 Silver 0 Bronze 0 Total 0

Summer Olympics appearances (overview)
- 1920; 1924; 1928; 1932; 1936; 1948; 1952; 1956; 1960; 1964; 1968; 1972; 1976; 1980; 1984; 1988; 1992; 1996; 2000; 2004; 2008; 2012; 2016; 2020; 2024; 2028

Brazil competed at the 1936 Summer Olympics in Berlin, Germany. This was the nation's fourth appearance at the Olympics, after debuting in 1920 and missing the 1928 Summer Olympics. 73 competitors, 67 men and 6 women, took part in 37 events in 9 sports.

== Athletics ==
Sílvio Magalhães Padilha (flagbearer, and future COB president).

Men
Track & road events

Athlete	Event	Heat		Quarterfinal		Semifinal		Final	
Athlete	Event	Result	Rank	Result	Rank	Result	Rank	Result	Rank
José de Almeida	100 m	11.1	3	did not advance					
José de Almeida	200 m	NT		did not advance					
Antônio de Carvalho	400 m	50.4	5	did not advance					
Oswaldo Domingues	100 m	NT		did not advance					
Darcy Guimarães	110 m hurdles	NT	4	did not advance					
Sylvio Padilha	400 m hurdles	54.2	2 Q	—N/a		53.3	3 Q	54.0	5

Field events

Athlete	Event	Qualification		Final	
Athlete	Event	Distance	Position	Distance	Position
Antônio Lira	Shot put	?	16	did not advance	
Ícaro Mello	High jump	1.80	23	did not advance	
Alfredo Mendes	High jump	1.80	23	did not advance	
Assis Naban	Hammer throw	?	18	did not advance	
Márcio de Oliveira	Long jump	?	Q	7.05	15

== Basketball ==
=== Men's tournament ===
First round

7 August

Brazil	28–17	Canada

Imperial Sports Field, Berlin

Second round

9 August

Chile	23–18	Brazil

Imperial Sports Field, Berlin

Second consolation round

10 August

Brazil	32–14	Taiwan

Imperial Sports Field, Berlin

Third round

11 August

Poland	33–25	Brazil

Imperial Sports Field, Berlin

== Cycling ==
Three cyclists, all male, represented Brazil in 1936.

=== Road ===
Athlete	Event	Time	Rank
Dertônio Ferrer	Men's road race	NT	
José Magnani	Men's road race	NT	
Hermógenes Netto	Men's road race	NT	

== Fencing ==
Six fencers, five men and one woman, represented Brazil in 1936.

Men

Ranks given are within the pool.

Fencer	Event	Round 1		Round 2		Quarterfinals		Semifinals		Final	
Fencer	Event	Result	Rank	Result	Rank	Result	Rank	Result	Rank	Result	Rank
Lodovico Alessandri	Men's foil	1–5	6	did not advance							
Moacyr Dunham	Men's foil	0–4	6	did not advance							
Ricardo Vagnotti	Men's foil	1–4	5	did not advance							
Henrique de Aguilar	Men's épée	6–0	1 Q	—N/a		5–0	4 Q	2–0	10	did not advance	
Moacyr Dunham	Men's épée	0–0	8	did not advance							
Ennio de Oliveira	Men's épée	2–0	7	did not advance							
Lodovico Alessandri	Men's sabre	1–5	6	did not advance							
Moacyr Dunham	Men's sabre	0–6	8	did not advance							
Ennio de Oliveira	Men's sabre	0–7	9	did not advance							
Moacyr Dunham; Ennio de Oliveira; Ricardo Vagnotti; Lodovico Alessandri	Team foil	France; L 0–16; Yugoslavia; L 7–9	3	did not advance							
Moacyr Dunham; Ricardo Vagnotti; Henrique de Aguilar; Ennio de Oliveira	Team epee	Germany; L 6–9; Canada; L 7–8	3	did not advance							

Women

Ranks given are within the pool.

Fencer	Event	Round 1		Round 2		Quarterfinals		Semifinals		Final	
Fencer	Event	Result	Rank	Result	Rank	Result	Rank	Result	Rank	Result	Rank
Hilda von Puttkammer	Women's foil	3–3	4 Q	—N/a		0–4	6	did not advance			

== Modern pentathlon ==
Three male pentathletes represented Brazil in 1936.

Men

Athlete	Event	Riding (show jumping)	Fencing (épée one touch)	Shooting (25 m rapid-fire pistol)	Swimming (300 m freestyle)	Running (4000 m)	Total points	Final rank
Athlete	Event	Points	Points	Points	Points	Points	Total points	Final rank
Guilherme Catramby Filho	Men's	1.0	17.5	157	28	36	159.5	36
Rui Duarte	Men's	18	15.5	167	23	33	160.0	37
Anísio da Rocha	Men's	41,5	18.5	146	39	30	177.5	39

== Rowing ==
Brazil had 22 male rowers participate in six out of seven rowing events in 1936.

Athlete	Event	Heats		Repechage		Semifinals		Final	
Athlete	Event	Time	Rank	Time	Rank	Time	Rank	Time	Rank
Celestino de Palma	Single sculls	7:37.7	2 R	7:49.7	3	did not advance			
Adamor Gonçalves; Paschoal Rapuano	Double sculls	7:26.3	6 q	—N/a		8:30.2	5	did not advance	
Afonso de Castro; Eduardo Lehman	Coxless pair	7:40.2	4 q	BYE		DNF		did not advance	
Estevam Strata; José Ramalho; Decio Klettenberg	Coxed pair	8:13.7	6 q	—N/a		9:32.3	5	did not advance	
Nelson Ribeiro; Álvaro de Sá Freire; José de Campos; Wilson de Freitas; Henrique Camargo	Coxed four	7:01.3	2 q	—N/a		8:26.0	4	did not advance	
Arno Franzen; Maximo Fava; Ernesto Sauter; Alfredo de Baer; Frederico Tadewald; Henrique Kranen; Nilo Franzen; Lauro Franzen; Rodolpho Rath	Eight	6:33.2	5 R	7:06.1	4	—N/a		did not advance	

== Sailing ==
Open

Athlete	Event	Race														Final rank	
Athlete	Event	1		2		3		4		5		6		7		Final rank	
Athlete	Event	Score	Rank	Score	Rank	Score	Rank	Score	Rank	Score	Rank	Score	Rank	Score	Rank	Score	Rank
Walter Heuer	O-Jolle	21	5	21	5	22	4	14	12	25	1	17	9	23	3	39	24

== Shooting ==
Four shooters represented Brazil in 1936.

Men

Athlete	Event	Final	
Athlete	Event	Score	Rank
Manoel Braga	50 metre rifle prone	287	51
Harvey Dias Villela	50 m pistol	515	25
Antônio Guimarães	50 metre rifle prone	292	23
José Mello	50 metre rifle prone	296	5

== Swimming ==
Men

Athlete	Event	Heat		Semifinal		Final	
Athlete	Event	Time	Rank	Time	Rank	Time	Rank
Julius Edgar Arp	200 metre breaststroke	3:02.6	5	did not advance			
Ademar Caballero	100 metre backstroke	1:17.0	4	did not advance			
Antônio Amaral Filho	100 metre backstroke	1:21.0	7	did not advance			
João Havelange	400 metre freestyle	5:31.5	4	did not advance			
João Havelange	1500 metre freestyle	22:54.1	5	did not advance			
Aluizio Lage	400 metre freestyle	5:18.3	5	did not advance			
Isaac Moraes	100 metre freestyle	1:03.5	5	did not advance			
Benvenuto Nunes	100 metre backstroke	1:16.9	6	did not advance			
Leônidas da Silva	100 metre freestyle	1:03.3	5	did not advance			
Antônio Luiz dos Santos	200 metre breaststroke	2:56.8	4	did not advance			
Paulo Tarrto	100 metre freestyle	1:02.6	5	did not advance			
Manoel Villar	400 metre freestyle	5:18.2	4	did not advance			
Manoel Villar	1500 metre freestyle	21:49.9	5	did not advance			
Aluizio Lage; Leônidas da Silva; Manoel Villar; Isaac Moraes	4 x 200 metre freestyle	—N/a		9:42.5	3	did not advance	

Women

Athlete	Event	Heat		Semifinal		Final	
Athlete	Event	Time	Rank	Time	Rank	Time	Rank
Piedade Coutinho	100 metre freestyle	1:09.4	3 Q	1:09.6	5	did not advance	
Piedade Coutinho	400 metre freestyle	5:35.5	3 Q	5:42.5	2 Q	5:35.2	5
Maria Lenk	200 metre breaststroke	3:17.2	3 Q	3:17.7	6	did not advance	
Helena Salles	100 metre freestyle	1:16.2	6	did not advance			
Scylla Venâncio	100 metre freestyle	1:15.1	8	did not advance			
Scylla Venâncio	400 metre freestyle	6:23.0	5	did not advance			
Sieglinda Zigler	100 metre backstroke	1:32.0	8	did not advance			
