= 1939 South American Championships in Athletics =

- Dates: 25–28 May
- Host city: Lima, Peru

The 1939 South American Championships in Athletics were held in Lima, Peru. This edition marked the introduction of athletic events for women competitors between 25 and 28 May.

== Medal summary ==
=== Men's events ===
Event	Gold		Silver		Bronze	
100 metres	José de Assis; Brazil	10.6 =CR	Roberto Valenzuela; Chile	10.8	Eulogio Higueras; Peru	10.9
200 metres	José de Assis; Brazil	21.4 CR	Roberto Valenzuela; Chile	21.9	Jaime Slullitel; Argentina	22.0
400 metres	Sylvio Padilha; Brazil	49.1	Antonio Cuba; Peru	49.4	Raúl Muñoz; Chile	49.6
800 metres	Luis Espinoza; Peru	1:55.6	Luis Elorga; Argentina	1:56.3	Guillermo García; Chile	1:56.3
1500 metres	Miguel Castro; Chile	3:57.6 CR	Guillermo García; Chile	3:58.6	Juan Herrera; Argentina	4:01.8
3000 metres	Miguel Castro; Chile	8:42.4 CR	Ubaldo Ibarra; Argentina	8:44.0	Guillermo García; Chile	8:48.2
5000 metres	Miguel Castro; Chile	15:06.0	Roger Ceballos; Argentina	15:09.8	Ubaldo Ibarra; Argentina	15:12.2
10,000 metres	Roger Ceballos; Argentina	31:48.0	Raúl Ibarra; Argentina	31:53.6	Ezequiel Bustamente; Argentina	31:57.4
Road race	Manuel Ramírez; Chile	1:58:59	Julio Montecinos; Chile	1:59:46	Segundo Rosas; Chile	2:01:10
110 metres hurdles	Alfredo Mendes; Brazil	15.0	Mário da Cunha; Brazil	15.6	Hélio Pereira; Brazil	15.6
400 metres hurdles	Sylvio Padilha; Brazil	53.6 CR	Marcelo Julca; Peru	55.0	Roberto González; Argentina	55.5
4 × 100 metres relay	Brazil; Guilherme Puschnik; Márcio de Oliveira; Sylvio Padilha; José de Assis	42.1 CR	Chile; Alejandro González; Roberto Valenzuela; Alfonso Hoelzel; John Sutton	42.4	Argentina; Jaime Slullitel; Raúl Chane; Antonio Fondevilla; José Ferraz	42.4
4 × 400 metres relay	Brazil; Emilio Antonio Elias; Sylvio Padilha; José de Assis; Antonio Damaso	3:19.0 CR	Argentina; Alberto Montana; Marino Cid; Roberto González; José López	3:19.8	Chile; Felipe Gamez; Roberto Yokota; Reyes; Raúl Muñoz	3:20.2
3000 metres team race	Chile	10	Argentina	11	Brazil	33
Cross country	Manuel Carreño; Chile	49:56.0	Raúl Ibarra; Argentina	50:16.6	Domingo Ticona; Peru	50:23.4
High jump	Julio Mera; Peru	1.85	Icaro Mello; Brazil	1.85	Carlos Pinto; Brazil	1.85
Pole vault	Erwin Reimer; Chile	3.85	Luís Taliberti; Brazil	3.80	Fernando Montero; Chile	3.80
Long jump	Márcio de Oliveira; Brazil	7.29	Guillermo Dyer; Peru	7.25	Carlos Iturri; Peru	6.97
Triple jump	Oscar Bringas; Peru	15.22 CR	Néstor Tenorio; Argentina	15.19	Carlos Pinto; Brazil	14.40
Shot put	Francisco Scabello; Brazil	13.88	Karsten Brödersen; Chile	13.59	Carmine Di Giorgio; Brazil	13.55
Discus throw	Bento Barros; Brazil	44.47 CR	Karsten Brödersen; Chile	41.55	Antônio Giusfredi; Brazil	41.39
Hammer throw	Juan Fusé; Argentina	49.77	Assis Naban; Brazil	49.05	Antonio Barticevic; Chile	47.74
Javelin throw	Egon Falkenberg; Brazil	62.84 CR	Luís Pagliari; Brazil	60.14	Oswaldo Wenzel; Chile	58.85
Decathlon	Juan Colín; Chile	5932	João Rehder Netto; Brazil	5887	Karsten Brödersen; Chile	5862

=== Women's events ===
Event	Gold		Silver		Bronze	
100 metres	Carola Castro; Ecuador	12.6	Lelia Spuhr; Argentina	12.7	Julia Druskus; Argentina	12.7
200 metres	Lelia Spuhr; Argentina	25.9	Carola Castro; Ecuador	26.2	Lily Warch; Chile	27.1
80 metres hurdles	Sofía Dreyer; Argentina	12.5	Rosa Marticorena; Peru	13.1	Olga Tassi; Argentina	13.1
4 × 100 metres relay	Argentina; Elsa Irigoyen; Olga Tassi; Lelia Spuhr; Julia Druskus	49.5	Chile; Raquel Martínez; Ilse Karlsruher; María Boecke; Lily Warch	50.8	Peru; Ivonne Abdala; Julia Yáñez; Zoila Garces; Flor Benvenuto	50.9
High jump	Ilse Barends; Chile	1.45	Gabriela Sprenger; Chile	1.45	Lelia Spuhr; Argentina	1.45
Long jump	Raquel Martínez; Chile	5.13	Olga Tassi; Argentina	5.12	Zoila Garcés; Peru	4.80
Shot put	Ruth Caro; Argentina	11.22	Edith Klempau; Chile	10.96	Kate Fastner; Argentina	10.71
Discus throw	María Boecke; Chile	32.61	Ernestina Casaverde; Peru	30.61	Edith Klempau; Chile	28.98
Javelin throw	Ruth Caro; Argentina	36.85	Olga Merino; Chile	31.91	Kate Fastner; Argentina	30.28

== Medal table ==
Rank	Nation	Gold	Silver	Bronze	Total
1	Chile (CHI)	11	11	11	33
2	Brazil (BRA)	11	6	6	23
3	Argentina (ARG)	7	10	11	28
4	Peru (PER)	3	5	5	13
5	Ecuador (ECU)	1	1	0	2
Totals (5 entries)		33	33	33	99
