= 1941 South American Championships in Athletics =

- Dates: 26 April–4 May
- Host city: Buenos Aires, Argentina

The 1941 South American Championships in Athletics were held in the Argentine capital, Buenos Aires, between 26 April and 4 May.

== Medal summary ==
=== Men's events ===
Event	Gold		Silver		Bronze	
100 metres	José de Assis; Brazil	10.8	José Ferraz; Brazil	10.9	Roberto Valenzuela; Chile	11.1
200 metres	José de Assis; Brazil	21.4 =CR	Luis Venini; Argentina	21.8	Roberto Valenzuela; Chile	22.4
400 metres	Rosalvo Ramos; Brazil	50.2	Agenor da Silva; Brazil	50.3	Antonio Cuba; Peru	50.4
800 metres	Guillermo García; Chile	1:54.2 CR	Isidoro Ferrere; Argentina	1:55.7	Roberto Yokota; Chile	1:55.7
1500 metres	Guillermo García; Chile	3:58.7	Isidoro Ferrere; Argentina	4:02.2	Arturo Torres; Chile	4:03.1
3000 metres	Raúl Ibarra; Argentina	8:39.4 CR	Arturo Torres; Chile	8:47.6	Delfo Cabrera; Argentina	8:48.0
5000 metres	Raúl Ibarra; Argentina	14:57.2 CR	Reinaldo Gorno; Argentina	15:12.1	Raúl Inostroza; Chile	15:13.3
10,000 metres	Raúl Ibarra; Argentina	30:45.0 CR	Reinaldo Gorno; Argentina	31:39.6	René Millas; Chile	31:41.8
32 km road race	Tomás Palomeque; Argentina	2:03:16	Saturnino Cuello; Argentina	2:03:22	Eusebio Guiñez; Argentina	2:03:42
110 metres hurdles	Mário da Cunha; Brazil	15.1	Hélio Pereira; Brazil	15.2	Julio Jaime; Uruguay	15.5
400 metres hurdles	Alfonso Hoelzel; Chile	56.4	Alfonso Rozas; Chile	56.9	Sylvio Padilha; Brazil	57.0
4 × 100 metres relay	Brazil; Márcio de Oliveira; Sylvio Padilha; Guilherme Puschnik; José de Assis	42.3	Chile; Nelson Pereira; Alejandro González; Alfonso Hoelzel; Roberto Valenzuela	42.7	Argentina; Alejandro de Anchorena; Jaime Slullitel; Guillermo Martínez Bo; Luis Venini	43.4
4 × 400 metres relay	Chile; Raúl Muñoz; Ernesto Riveros; Roberto Yokota; Roberto Yokota	3:21.9	Argentina; Luis Venini; Victorino Triulzi; Briggs; Eligio Chiapetta	3:22.3	Uruguay; Carlos Baroffio; Alberto Perreira; José Cuneo; Julio Jaime	3:27.8
3000 metres team race	Argentina	10	Chile	14	Brazil	26
Cross country	Raúl Ibarra; Argentina	36:11.0	Raúl Inostroza; Chile	37:18.0	René Aldana; Chile	37:27.4
High jump	Guido Hanning; Chile	1.94 CR	Alfredo Mendes; Brazil	1.85	Faustino Poyo; Argentina	1.85
Pole vault	Lúcio de Castro; Brazil	4.00 CR	Icaro Mello; Brazil	4.00	Erwin Reimer; Chile	3.70
Long jump	Guillermo Dyer; Peru	7.20	Ernesto Juárez; Argentina	7.05	Mario Quesada; Argentina	6.94
Triple jump	Carlos Pinto; Brazil	15.10	Néstor Tenorio; Argentina	14.90	Jorge Richard; Brazil	14.59
Shot put	Ricardo Nitz; Brazil	14.62 CR	Carmine Di Giorgio; Brazil	13.71	Antônio Lyra; Brazil	13.51
Discus throw	Manuel Consiglieri; Peru	46.40 CR	Karsten Brödersen; Chile	45.05	Bento Barros; Brazil	45.02
Hammer throw	Assis Naban; Brazil	49.71	Juan Fusé; Argentina	48.98	Federico Kleger; Argentina	46.60
Javelin throw	Egon Falkenberg; Brazil	59.42	Alberto Becher; Argentina	59.05	Efraín Santibáñez; Chile	56.37
Decathlon	Emilio Rüegg; Brazil	6411	Juan Colín; Chile	6315	Karsten Brödersen; Chile	6037

=== Women's events ===
Event	Gold		Silver		Bronze	
100 metres	Lelia Spuhr; Argentina	13.1	María Malvicini; Argentina	13.3	Crista Jane Giese; Brazil	13.3
200 metres	Lelia Spuhr; Argentina	26.0	Elizabeth Müller; Brazil	26.4	Julia Yáñez; Peru	27.6
80 metres hurdles	Crista Jane Giese; Brazil	12.4 CR	Betty Morales; Chile	12.5	Ursula Hennel; Brazil	13.0
4 × 100 metres relay	Argentina; Elsa Irigoyen; Noemi Simonetto; Olga Tassi; Lelia Spuhr	51.2	Chile; Lily Warch; Elena Martinelli; Betty Morales; Ilse Barends	51.8	Brazil; Crista Jane Giese; Elizabeth Müller; Ursula Hennel; Ursula Kraus	52.6
High jump	Lelia Spuhr; Argentina	1.55 CR	Ilse Barends; Chile	1.50	Crista Jane Giese; Brazil; Instrud Kastdorff; Uruguay; Noemi Simonetto; Argentina	1.45
Long jump	Instrud Kastdorff; Uruguay	5.12	Ilse Barends; Chile	5.03	Noemí Simonetto; Argentina	4.96
Shot put	Ingeborg Mello; Argentina	11.81 CR	Edith Klempau; Chile	10.74	Julia Iriarte; Bolivia	10.45
Discus throw	Christel Balde; Chile	35.59 CR	María Boecke; Chile	35.04	Ingeborg Mello; Argentina	33.80
Javelin throw	Ruth Caro; Argentina	36.87 CR	Ursula Holle; Chile	36.68	Olga Merino; Chile	34.63

== Medal table ==
Rank	Nation	Gold	Silver	Bronze	Total
1	Argentina (ARG)	12	12	9	33
2	Brazil (BRA)	12	7	9	28
3	Chile (CHI)	6	13	11	30
4	Peru (PER)	2	0	2	4
5	Uruguay (URU)	1	0	3	4
6	Venezuela (VEN)	0	1	0	1
7	Bolivia (BOL)	0	0	1	1
Totals (7 entries)		33	33	35	101
