= 1935 South American Championships in Athletics =

- Dates: 11–14 April
- Host city: Santiago, Chile

The 1935 South American Championships in Athletics were held in Santiago, Chile, between 11 and 14 April.

== Medal summary ==
=== Men's events ===
Event	Gold		Silver		Bronze	
100 metres	José de Almeida; Brazil	10.7	José Vicente Salinas; Chile	10.8	Aloisio Queiroz Telles; Brazil	10.9
200 metres	José Vicente Salinas; Chile	21.9	Aloisio Queiroz Telles; Brazil	22.2	Juan Anderson; Argentina	22.3
400 metres	José Vicente Salinas; Chile	48.7	Juan Anderson; Argentina	49.1	Carlos Baroffio; Uruguay	50.3
800 metres	Juan Anderson; Argentina	1:55.2 =CR	Néstor Gomes; Brazil	1:55.2	Guillermo García; Chile	1:56.4
1500 metres	Miguel Castro; Chile	4:04.0	Guillermo García; Chile	4:05.4	Néstor Gomes; Brazil	4:05.6
3000 metres	Miguel Castro; Chile	8:55.0	Roger Ceballos; Argentina	9:02.0	Carmelo Di Gaeta; Uruguay	9:07.4
5000 metres	Roger Ceballos; Argentina	15:44.0	Atilio Rozas; Chile	16:07.6	Juan Ruiz; Chile	16:27.2
10,000 metres	Roger Ceballos; Argentina	32:58.0	René Millas; Chile	33:32.8	Juan Ruiz; Chile	33:48.2
Road race	José Farías; Peru	2:05:08	Manuel Ramírez; Chile	2:07:45	Juan Becerra; Chile	2:14:08
110 metres hurdles	Alfredo Mendes; Brazil	15.0	Alfredo Egaña; Chile	15.9	Neil McIntosh; Chile	16.6
400 metres hurdles	José Vicente Salinas; Chile	56.0	Ciro Vignoli; Uruguay	56.6	Walter Rehder; Brazil	56.6
4 × 100 metres relay	Chile; José Vicente Salinas; Alberto Keitel; Alfredo Stein; Heriberto Stein	42.4	Brazil; Ivo Sallowicz; José de Almeida; Aloisio Queiroz Telles; Marcio de Oliveira	42.5	Uruguay; Ciro Vignoli; Carlos Baroffio; Carlos Aicardi; Rubén Bonifaccino	44.2
4 × 400 metres relay	Chile; José Vicente Salinas; Felipe Gamez; Raúl Muñoz; Ernesto Riveros	3:24.8	Brazil; Alfredo Colombo; Walter Rehder; João Rehder Netto; Aloisio Queiroz Telles	3:25.6	Uruguay; Carlos Baroffio; Rubén Bonifaccino; José Pijuan; Ciro Vignoli	3:30.7
3000 metres team race	Chile		Peru			
Cross country	René Millas; Chile	54:54.6	Manuel Ramírez; Chile	56:08.6	Carlos Ibáñez; Chile	57:20.6
High jump	Icaro Mello; Brazil	1.86 =CR	Alfonso Burgos; Chile	1.86	Julio Bastón; Uruguay	1.83
Pole vault	Guillermo Chirichigno; Peru	3.50	Fernando Montero; Chile	3.50	José Gagliardi; Peru	3.50
Long jump	João Rehder Netto; Brazil	7.03	Márcio de Oliveira; Brazil	6.85	Víctor Daniels; Chile	6.72
Triple jump	Juan Reccius; Chile	14.14	Oscar Bringas; Peru	14.06	Julio Bastón; Uruguay	13.83
Shot put	Carmine Di Giorgio; Brazil	13.69	Hans Conrads; Chile	13.56	Héctor Benapres; Chile	13.16
Discus throw	Waldo Schönfeldt; Chile	40.44	Héctor Benapres; Chile	39.88	Manuel Consiglieri; Peru	39.67
Hammer throw	Antonio Barticevic; Chile	46.00	Assis Naban; Brazil	45.97	Ricardo Bayer; Chile	45.71
Javelin throw	Efraín Santibáñez; Chile	57.45	Oswaldo Wenzel; Chile	56.31	Juan Berger; Chile	51.65
Decathlon	Oswaldo Wenzel; Chile	5992	Erwin Reimer; Chile	5742	Hermán Otto; Chile	5433

== Medal table ==
Rank	Nation	Gold	Silver	Bronze	Total
1	Chile (CHI)	14	13	11	38
2	Brazil (BRA)	5	6	3	14
3	Argentina (ARG)	3	2	1	6
4	Peru (PER)	2	2	2	6
5	Uruguay (URU)	0	1	6	7
Totals (5 entries)		24	24	23	71
