= Filho =

Filho (Note: Portuguese pronunciation: [ˈfiʎu], lit. 'son') is a Portuguese-language generational suffix. As with its English-language equivalent Jr., (Note: As in, for example, Martin Luther King, Jr.) the suffix is placed after a son's name when his father has the same name. Filho is also documented as a surname, particularly in Brazil

References:

- Hanks, Patrick, et al. Dictionary of American Family Names, 2nd edition. Oxford University Press, 2022.
- International Federation of Library Associations and Institutions. Names of Persons: Brazil, 2016.

Notable people with the last name or the suffix include:

- Adelmar Faria Coimbra-Filho (1924–2016), Brazilian biologist
- Adilson Carlos Tavares Filho (born 1988), Brazilian footballer
- Aguinaldo Filho, Brazilian actor
- Alfredo Saad-Filho, Brazilian economist
- Álvaro Morais Filho (born 1990), Brazilian beach volleyball player
- Álvaro dos Santos Filho (born 1911), Brazilian sports shooter
- Amarildo Filho (born 1988), Brazilian politician
- Antônio Amaral Filho (1921–1988), Brazilian swimmer
- Armando Monteiro Filho (1925–2018), Brazilian businessman, engineer and politician
- Café Filho (1899–1970), Brazilian politician
- Carlos Bittencourt Filho (born 1930), Brazilian sailor
- Carlos Chagas Filho (1910–2000), Brazilian physician and biologist
- Carlos dos Reis Filho (1906–?), Brazilian hurdler
- Casimiro Montenegro Filho (1904–2000), Brazilian army and air force officer
- Ciro Nogueira Lima Filho (born 1968), Brazilian lawyer and politician
- Daniel Filho (born 1937), Brazilian film producer, director, actor and screenwriter
- Domingos Nascimento dos Santos Filho (born 1985), Brazilian footballer
- Edison Lobão Filho (born 1964), Brazilian politician and businessman
- Eli Corrêa Filho (born 1976), Brazilian politician
- Ernesto Flores Filho, Brazilian rowing coxswain
- Ézio Leal Moraes Filho (1966–2011), Brazilian footballer
- Fausto Sucena Rasga Filho (1929–2007), Brazilian basketball player
- Fernando Coelho Filho (born 1984), Brazilian businessman and politician
- Francisco Filho (born 1971), Brazilian kickboxer
- Francisco Filho (born 1940), Brazilian footballer
- Francisco Accioly Rodrigues da Costa Filho (1920–1979), Brazilian lawyer, professor and politician
- Garibaldi Alves Filho (born 1947), Brazilian politician
- Gilson Machado Filho (born 1998), Brazilian politician
- Guilherme Catramby Filho (born 1905–?), Brazilian modern pentathlete
- Hélio José Muniz Filho, Brazilian criminal
- Irênio José Soares Filho (born 1975), Brazilian footballer
- Jardel Filho (1928–1983), Brazilian actor
- Jean Paulo Fernandes Filho (born 1995), Brazilian footballer
- João Lopes Filho (born c. 1943), Capeverdean anthropologist, historian and novelist
- Joaquim Pedro Salgado Filho (1888–1950), Brazilian lawyer and politician
- Jorge Luiz Frello Filho (born 1991), known by his professional name Jorginho, a Brazilian-born Italian international footballer
- José Carlos Ferreira Filho (born 1983), Brazilian footballer
- José Carlos Gomes Filho (born 1979), Brazilian footballer
- José de Carvalho Filho (born 1931), Brazilian rower
- José Celso de Mello Filho (born 1945), Brazilian jurist
- José Filho Duarte (born 1980), Brazilian footballer
- José Rezende Filho (1929–1977), Brazilian writer
- José Viegas Filho (born 1942), Brazilian diplomat
- Kleber Mendonça Filho (born 1968), Brazilian film director, screenwriter, producer and critic
- Lourenço Filho (1897–1970), Brazilian educator
- Luiz Antônio Fleury Filho (born 1949), Brazilian politician, prosecutor and professor
- Marçal Justen Filho (born 1955), Brazilian attorney and Law professor
- Mário Filho (1908–1966), Brazilian journalist and writer
- Mauro Mendonça Filho (born 1965), Brazilian television director
- Mendonça Filho (born 1966), Brazilian businessman and politician
- Miguel Fenelon Câmara Filho (1925–2018), Brazilian Roman Catholic archbishop
- Moses Filho (born 2001), Brazilian politician
- Oduvaldo Vianna Filho (1936–1974), Brazilian playwright
- Olímpio Mourão Filho (1900–1972), Brazilian general
- Oscar Filho (born 1978), Brazilian actor, comedian, writer and reporter
- Osvaldo Lourenço Filho (born 1987), Brazilian footballer
- Oswaldo Simões Filho (born 1952), Brazilian judoka
- Otávio Frias Filho (1957–2018), Brazilian newspaper editor
- Paulo Filho (born 1978), Brazilian mixed martial artist
- Paulo Henrique Filho (d. 2017), Brazilian footballer
- Paulo Henrique Carneiro Filho (born 1989), Brazilian footballer
- Paulo Machado de Carvalho Filho (1924–2010), Brazilian businessman and impresario
- Pedro Rodrigues Filho (1954–2023), Brazilian serial killer
- Poubel Filho (born 2003), Brazilian politician
- Renan Filho (born 1979), Brazilian economist and politician
- Roniere Jose da Silva Filho (born 1986), Portuguese footballer
- Salatiel Bartolomeu de Paiva Filho (born 1992), Brazilian footballer
- Sálvio Spínola Fagundes Filho (born 1968), Brazilian football referee
- Sarney Filho (born 1957), Brazilian lawyer and politician
- Sérgio Cabral Filho (born 1963), Brazilian politician and journalist
- Tarcísio Filho (born 1964), Brazilian actor
- Teotonio Vilela Filho (born 1951), Brazilian economist and politician
- Valdo Filho (born 1964), Brazilian footballer
- Vital do Rêgo Filho (born 1963), Brazilian politician and doctor

== See also ==
- Neto, a similar Portuguese-language generational suffix
- Portuguese name
