= 1937 South American Championships in Athletics =

- Dates: 27–30 May
- Host city: São Paulo, Brazil

The 1937 South American Championships in Athletics were held in São Paulo, Brazil between 27 and 30 May.

== Medal summary ==
=== Men's events ===
Event	Gold		Silver		Bronze	
100 metres	José de Assis; Brazil	10.6 =CR	José Ferraz; Brazil	10.8	Roberto Cavanna; Argentina	
200 metres	Carlos Hoffmeister; Argentina	21.6 CR	Aloisio Queiroz Telles; Brazil	21.7	Roberto Cavanna; Argentina	
400 metres	Antônio Damaso; Brazil	50.0	Roberto González; Argentina	50.1	Ciro de Andrade; Brazil	50.1
800 metres	Inocencio Di Pino; Argentina	1:56.2	Roberto Gregg; Argentina	1:56.4	Floriano de Souza; Brazil	
1500 metres	Néstor Gomes; Brazil	4:04.4	Floriano de Souza; Brazil	4:08.6	Luis Elorga; Argentina	4:10.6
3000 metres	Ubaldo Ibarra; Argentina	8:53.6	Carmelo Di Gaeta; Uruguay	8:54.6	Néstor Gomes; Brazil	8:54.6
5000 metres	Roger Ceballos; Argentina	15:41.8	Ubaldo Ibarra; Argentina	15:52.8	Mário de Oliveira; Brazil	16:23.4
10,000 metres	Mário de Oliveira; Brazil	33:02.6	Ubaldo Ibarra; Argentina	33:56.8	José dos Santos; Brazil	
Road race	Saturnino Cuello; Argentina	2:07:35	José Farías; Peru	2:11:21	Genésio da Silva; Brazil	2:14:30
110 metres hurdles	Juan Lavenás; Argentina	15.2	Darcy Guimarães; Brazil	15.3	Alfredo Mendes; Brazil	
400 metres hurdles	Roberto González; Argentina	55.2	Darcy Guimarães; Brazil	56.1	Guillermo Sayán; Peru	
4 × 100 metres relay	Argentina; Guillermo Martínez Bo; Thomas Beswick; Roberto Cavanna; Juan Lavenás	42.5	Brazil; José de Almeida; Aloisio Queiroz Telles; José Ferraz; Guilherme Puschnik	42.6	Peru; Camino; José Castro; Mellet; Carlos de la Guerra	
4 × 400 metres relay	Brazil; Ciro de Andrade; José Ferraz; Aloisio Queiroz Telles; Antonio Damaso	3:20.6 CR	Argentina; Rodolfo Butori; Carlos Hoffmeister; Roberto González; Guillermo Martínez Bo	3:20.8	Uruguay; Carlos Baroffio; Carlos Jauregui; Saarby; Rubén Bonifaccino	
3000 metres team race	Brazil		Argentina		Uruguay	
Cross country	Raúl Ibarra; Argentina	57:45.2	José Farías; Peru	59:09.8	Eugenio Andrade; Brazil	59:48.0
High jump	Julio Mera; Peru	1.85	José Castro; Peru	1.85	Alfredo Mendes; Brazil	1.85
Pole vault	Walter Rehder; Brazil	3.90	Lúcio de Castro; Brazil	3.90	Luís Taliberti; Brazil	3.80
Long jump	Márcio de Oliveira; Brazil	7.37 CR	João Rehder Netto; Brazil	7.31	Gualberto Castilla; Uruguay	6.94
Triple jump	João Rehder Netto; Brazil	14.59	Néstor Tenorio; Argentina	14.56	Carlos Pinto; Brazil	14.28
Shot put	Carmine Di Giorgio; Brazil	14.14	Héctor Berra; Argentina	14.04	Rodolfo Butori; Argentina	13.78
Discus throw	Antônio Giusfredi; Brazil	44.32 CR	Bento Barros; Brazil	42.10	Argos Fiaccadori; Argentina	41.25
Hammer throw	Assis Naban; Brazil	51.39	Federico Kleger; Argentina	48.85	Juan Fusé; Argentina	48.38
Javelin throw	Luís Pagliari; Brazil	55.47	João Vizzone; Brazil	53.62	Juan Urbán; Argentina	52.40
Decathlon	João Rehder Netto; Brazil	6260	Pedro Furné; Argentina	6139	José de Souza Filho; Brazil	6015

== Medal table ==
Rank	Nation	Gold	Silver	Bronze	Total
1	Brazil (BRA)	14	10	12	36
2	Argentina (ARG)	9	10	7	26
3	Peru (PER)	1	3	2	6
4	Uruguay (URU)	0	1	3	4
Totals (4 entries)		24	24	24	72
