= Otacílio Neto =

Otacílio Neto means Otacílio, the grandson, may refer to:

- Otacílio Mariano Neto, (born 1982), Brazilian footballer
- Otacilio Jales da Silva Neto, (born 1984), Brazilian footballer

== See also ==
- Otacilio
- Neto (suffix)
