= Lage =

Lage may refer to:

== Places ==
- Lage, Lower Saxony
- Lage, North Rhine-Westphalia
- Lage, Sulawesi

== People ==
- Aluizio Lage (1919–1974), Brazilian swimmer
- Andrés Lage - Andrés Lage de Armas (born 1991), Venezuelan sailor.
- Bruno Lage (born 1976), Portuguese football manager
- Julian Lage (born 1987), American jazz guitarist and composer
- José María Sánchez Lage, Argentine footballer
- Jorge Enrique Lage (born 1979), Cuban novelist and short story writer
- Klaus Lage (born 1950), German musician
- Mathias Pereira Lage (born 1996), footballer
- Natália Lage (born 1978), Brazilian actress.
- Olivier Da Lage (born 1957), French journalist
