= Swimming at the 1936 Summer Olympics – Men's 100 metre backstroke =

Men's 100 metre backstroke at the Games of the XI Olympiad
- Venue: Olympiapark Schwimmstadion Berlin
- Date: 12 August 1936 (heats); 13 August 1936 (semifinals); 14 August 1936 (final)
- Competitors: 30 from 17 nations
- Winning time: 1:05.9 OR

Medalists
1st place, gold medalist(s)		Adolph Kiefer	United States
2nd place, silver medalist(s)		Al Vande Weghe	United States
3rd place, bronze medalist(s)		Masaji Kiyokawa	Japan

The men's 100 metre backstroke was a swimming event held as part of the swimming at the 1936 Summer Olympics programme. It was the seventh appearance of the event, which was established in 1908. The competition was held from Wednesday to Friday, 12 to 14 August 1936.

Thirty swimmers from 17 nations competed.

== Records ==
These were the standing world and Olympic records (in minutes) prior to the 1936 Summer Olympics.

World record	1:04.8	(United States) Adolph Kiefer	Detroit (USA)	18 January 1936
Olympic record	1:08.2	(United States) George Kojac	Amsterdam (NED)	9 August 1928

Adolph Kiefer set a new Olympic record in the first heat with 1:06.9 minutes. He bettered his record in the first semi-final with 1:06.8 minutes. In the final he improved the Olympic record again when he swam 1:05.9 minutes.

== Results ==
=== Heats ===
Wednesday 12 August 1936: The fastest three in each heat and the fastest from across the heats advanced to the semi-finals.

==== Heat 1 ====
Place	Swimmer	Time	Qual.
1	Adolph Kiefer (USA)	1:06.9	QQ OR
2	Masaji Kiyokawa (JPN)	1:07.2	QQ
3	Hans Schwarz (GER)	1:11.0	QQ
4	Elemér Gombos (HUN)	1:12.4	
5	Jack Middleton (GBR)	1:15.0	
6	Benevenuto Nunes (BRA)	1:16.9	

==== Heat 2 ====
Place	Swimmer	Time	Qual.
1	Taylor Drysdale (USA)	1:09.0	QQ
2	Heinz Schlauch (GER)	1:10.1	QQ
3	Draško Vilfan (YUG)	1:11.7	QQ
4	Stans Scheffer (NED)	1:13.6	
5	Árpád Lengyel (HUN)	1:15.2	
6	Munroe Bourne (CAN)	1:17.2	
7	Antônio Amaral Filho (BRA)	1:21.0	

==== Heat 3 ====
Place	Swimmer	Time	Qual.
1	Yasuhiko Kojima (JPN)	1:09.7	QQ
2	Al Vande Weghe (USA)	1:10.6	QQ
3	Nils Christiansen (PHI)	1:11.5	QQ
4	Erwin Simon (GER)	1:11.7	qq
5	György Erdélyi (HUN)	1:14.7	
6	Marcel Neumann (LUX)	1:18.8	

==== Heat 4 ====
Place	Swimmer	Time	Qual.
1	Jack Besford (GBR)	1:12.0	QQ
2	Gordon Kerr (CAN)	1:12.9	QQ
3	Björn Borg (SWE)	1:15.2	QQ
4	Boris Roolaid (EST)	1:21.1	
5	Emmanouil Mallidis (GRE)	1:21.5	

==== Heat 5 ====
Place	Swimmer	Time	Qual.
1	Kiichi Yoshida (JPN)	1:10.0	QQ
2	Percy Oliver (AUS)	1:10.2	QQ
3	Piet Metman (NED)	1:13.7	QQ
4	Ademar Caballero (BRA)	1:17.0	
5	Børge Bæth (DEN)	1:17.3	
6	Alfonso Casasempere (CHI)	1:21.0	

=== Semifinals ===
Thursday 13 August 1936: The fastest three in each semi-final and the fastest fourth-placed advanced to the final.

Semifinal 1

Place	Swimmer	Time	Qual.
1	Adolph Kiefer (USA)	1:06.8	QQ OR
2	Al Vande Weghe (USA)	1:08.6	QQ
3	Percy Oliver (AUS)	1:09.4	QQ
4	Kiichi Yoshida (JPN)	1:09.5	qq
5	Nils Christiansen (PHI)	1:11.1	
6	Erwin Simon (GER)	1:11.7	
7	Hans Schwarz (GER)	1:11.8	
8	Björn Borg (SWE)	1:16.3	

Semifinal 2

Place	Swimmer	Time	Qual.
1	Taylor Drysdale (USA)	1:08.6	QQ
2	Masaji Kiyokawa (JPN)	1:09.7	QQ
3	Yasuhiko Kojima (JPN)	1:09.9	QQ
4	Heinz Schlauch (GER)	1:10.8	
5	Gordon Kerr (CAN)	1:11.2	
6	Draško Vilfan (YUG)	1:13.3	
7	Jack Besford (GBR)	1:13.6	
8	Piet Metman (NED)	1:14.1	

=== Final ===
Friday 14 August 1936:

Place	Swimmer	Time
1	Adolph Kiefer (USA)	1:05.9 OR
2	Al Vande Weghe (USA)	1:07.7
3	Masaji Kiyokawa (JPN)	1:08.4
4	Taylor Drysdale (USA)	1:09.4
5	Kiichi Yoshida (JPN)	1:09.7
6	Yasuhiko Kojima (JPN)	1:10.4
7	Percy Oliver (AUS)	1:10.7
