= Neto (suffix) =

Portuguese-language generational suffix

Neto (Note: Portuguese pronunciation: [ˈnɛtu], lit. 'grandson') is a Portuguese-language generational suffix. As with its English-language equivalent III, (Note: As in, for example, Benigno Aquino III.) the suffix is placed after a boy or man's name when he, his father, and his grandfather all have the same name.

The following people bear the suffix Neto:

- António Agostinho Neto, former president of Angola
- Darcy Dolce Neto, Brazilian football (soccer) player
- Edmundo Alves de Souza Neto, Brazilian football (soccer) player
- Ernesto Neto, Brazilian visual artist
- Franco José Vieira Neto, Brazilian beach volleyball player
- João Cabral de Melo Neto, Brazilian poet
- João Marinho Neto, Brazilian supercentenarian, oldest living man
- José Ferreira Neto, Brazilian sports commentator and former association football player
- Luís Carlos Novo Neto, Portuguese footballer
- Michel Cury Neto, Brazilian footballer
- Norberto Murara Neto, Brazilian footballer
- Olyntho Neto (born 1986), Brazilian politician
- Otacílio Mariano Neto, Brazilian footballer
- Otacilio Jales da Silva Neto, Brazilian footballer
- Raul Bragança Neto, former prime minister of São Tomé and Príncipe
- Raul "Raulzinho" Togni Neto, Brazilian basketball player

== See also ==
- Filho (disambiguation), a similar Portuguese-language generational suffix
- Netto (surname)
- Portuguese name
