= Baeth =

Baeth or Bæth is a surname. Notable people with the surname include:

- Austin Baeth (born 1984), American politician and physician
- Børge Bæth (1920–1981), Danish swimmer
