= Tumble turn =

Turn in swimming

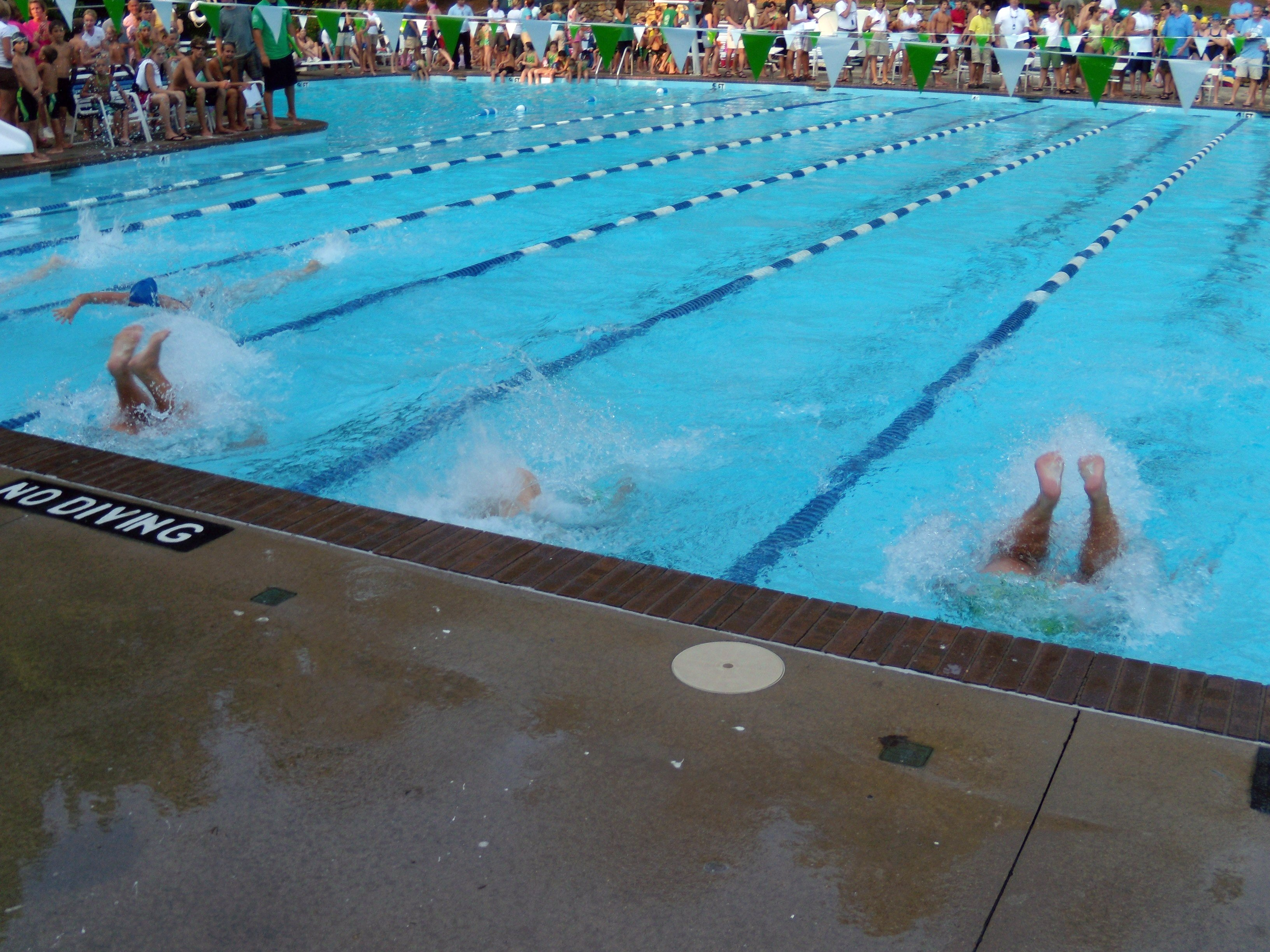
Swimmers performing tumble turns during a front crawl race

A tumble turn, sometimes referred to as a flip turn, can be completed by doing a submerged somersault whilst moving toward a wall. This movement involves throwing one's torso forward and forcing the body to begin rotating at the hips. Upon a full 180-degree rotation, one pushes off the wall in a streamline, finishing the turn.

A tumble turn or flip turn is one of the turns in swimming, used to reverse the direction in which the person is swimming. It is done when the swimmer reaches the end of the swimming pool but still has one or more lengths to swim.

The technique's development is credited, by the International Swimming Hall of Fame, to Al Vande Weghe at the AAU Nationals in 1934. Previously this entry erroneously credited the invention of the flip turn to University of Texas swim coach Tex Robertson while he was training Adolph Kiefer for the 1936 Olympics.

Flip turns are usually only used during freestyle and backstroke races. In butterfly and breaststroke races, regulations require swimmers to touch the end of the pool with both hands simultaneously before turning back for another length. While they legally can flip turn during butterfly and breaststroke races, it is more common to turn left or right to begin the next lap. This style of turning is called an open turn.

If the event is medley swimming turns vary based on the combination order of what stroke the swimmer is changing from and to. According to the USA Swimming Stroke and Turn Regulations, in order of the strokes the turns are to be:

1. Butterfly to backstroke is a two-hand touch open turn. Once a legal touch has been made, the swimmer may turn in any manner, but the shoulders must be at or past vertical towards the back when the swimmer leaves the wall.
2. Backstroke to breaststroke the swimmer must first touch on their back. Once a legal touch has been made, the swimmer may turn in any manner.
3. Breaststroke to freestyle is two hand touch open turn. Once a legal touch has been made, the swimmer may turn in any manner.
