= Rui Duarte =

Rui Duarte is the name of:

- Rui Duarte (footballer born 1978), Rui Pedro Viegas Silva Gomes Duarte, Portuguese football midfielder
- Rui Duarte (footballer born 1980), Rui Sandro de Carvalho Duarte, Portuguese football defender
- Rui Duarte (pentathlete) (born 1911), Brazilian modern pentathlete
