= Raquel Martínez =

Raquel Martínez may refer to:

- Raquel Martínez (athlete), Chilean sprinter
- Raquel Martínez Rabanal, Spanish journalist and television and radio hostess

== See also ==
- Raquel Martínez-Gómez, Spanish writer
