= 1943 South American Championships in Athletics =

- Dates: 23 April–2 May
- Host city: Santiago, Chile

The 1943 South American Championships in Athletics were held in Santiago, Chile, between 23 April and 2 May.

== Medal summary ==
=== Men's events ===
Event	Gold		Silver		Bronze	
100 metres	Adelio Márquez; Argentina	10.8	Walter Pérez; Uruguay	10.9	Roberto Valenzuela; Chile	11.0
200 metres	Roberto Valenzuela; Chile	22.2	Adelio Márquez; Argentina	22.2	Victorino Triulzi; Argentina	22.3
400 metres	Jorge Ehlers; Chile	48.6	Víctorino Triulzi; Argentina	49.2	Enrique Hurtado; Chile	49.8
800 metres	Alfonso Rozas; Chile	1:54.6	Guillermo García; Chile	1:55.4	Marino Cid; Argentina	1:55.5
1500 metres	Guillermo García; Chile	4:03.2	Melchor Palmeiro; Argentina	4:03.5	Marino Cid; Argentina	4:05.4
3000 metres	Raúl Inostroza; Chile	8:32.4 CR	Miguel Castro; Chile	8:35.0	Delfo Cabrera; Argentina	8:44.6
5000 metres	Raúl Inostroza; Chile	15:00.0	Miguel Castro; Chile	15:09.9	Delfo Cabrera; Argentina	15:11.0
10,000 metres	René Millas; Chile	31:27.4	Manuel Díaz; Chile	31:34.0	Delfo Cabrera; Argentina	31:36.8
32 km road race	Corsino Fernández; Argentina	1:45:45	Eusebio Guiñez; Argentina	1:45:53	Julio Montecinos; Chile	1:49:03
110 metres hurdles	Julio Jaime; Uruguay	15.7	Jorge Undurraga; Chile	15.8	Juan Colín; Chile	15.8
400 metres hurdles	Alfonso Rozas; Chile	55.1	Juan Hoelzel; Chile	55.6	Octavio Montero; Chile	57.1
4 × 100 metres relay	Argentina; Oscar Rebecchi; Fernández; Adelio Marquez; Leopoldo Monastirsky	42.4	Chile; Nelson Pereira; Juan Hoelzel; Alejandro González; Roberto Valenzuela	42.4	Uruguay; Julio Jaime; Ruben Gonda; Miglierina; José Cuneo	43.2
4 × 400 metres relay	Argentina; Alberto Propato; Adelio Marquez; Leopoldo Monastirsky; Victorino Triulzi	3:18.8 CR	Chile; Enrique Hurtado; Roberto Yokota; Jorge Ehlers; Alfonso Rozas	3:19.4	Bolivia; Heredia; Ayabiri; Domínguez; Colodro	3:41.1
3000 metres team race	Chile	10	Argentina	6	Bolivia	4
Cross country	Raúl Inostroza; Chile	46:08.0	Eusebio Guiñez; Argentina	46:14.0	René Millas; Chile	46:30.4
High jump	Antonio Barrionuevo; Argentina	1.83	Carlos Capella; Chile	1.80	Alfonso Burgos; Chile	1.75
Pole vault	Federico Horn; Chile	4.00 =CR	Erwin Reimer; Chile	3.80	Carlos Baumann; Argentina	3.60
Long jump	Alberto Eggeling; Chile	7.02	Juan Hoelzel; Chile	6.85	Guillermo Dyer; Peru	6.80
Triple jump	Guillermo Dyer; Peru	14.43	Oscar Bringas; Peru	14.41	Celestino Sarraua; Argentina	14.15
Shot put	Julián Llorente; Argentina	14.33	Raúl Rebagliatti; Argentina	13.50	Guillermo Otto; Chile	12.75
Discus throw	Manuel Consiglieri; Peru	44.43	Eduardo Julve; Peru	41.64	Alfredo Meynet; Chile	39.53
Hammer throw	Manuel Etchepare; Argentina	46.81	Juan Fusé; Argentina	46.06	Antonio Barticevic; Chile	44.82
Javelin throw	Otto Wenzel; Chile	57.08	Raúl Cóccaro; Uruguay	55.52	Rodolfo Correa; Chile	53.99
Decathlon	Juan Colín; Chile	6069	Eduardo Julve; Peru	6046	Roberto Stahringer; Argentina	5912

=== Women's events ===
Event	Gold		Silver		Bronze	
100 metres	Noemí Simonetto; Argentina	12.4 CR	Beatriz Kretschmer; Chile	12.6	Ilse Hammerl; Argentina	12.8
200 metres	Ilse Hammerl; Argentina	26.5	Beatriz Kretschmer; Chile	26.7	María Malvicini; Argentina	27.0
80 metres hurdles	Edith Klempau; Chile	12.0 CR	Susana Krumenaker; Argentina	12.1	Ilse Barends; Chile	12.2
4 × 100 metres relay	Argentina; Ilse Hammerl; Noemi Simonetto; Elsa Irigoyen; María Malvicini	49.5 =CR	Chile; Ilse Barends; Betty Morales; Edith Klempau; Betty Kretschmer	50.8	Bolivia; Julia Iriarte; Luz Azcarraga; Carmela Rosa Soto; Gisela Brumm	53.3
High jump	Ilse Barends; Chile	1.50	Edith Klempau; Chile	1.50	Noemí Simonetto; Argentina	1.50
Long jump	Noemí Simonetto; Argentina	5.27 CR	Ilse Barends; Chile	5.25	Lily Warch; Chile	4.93
Shot put	Edith Klempau; Chile	11.70	Ingeborg Mello; Argentina	10.98	Lore Zippelius; Chile	10.79
Discus throw	Lore Zippelius; Chile	37.16 CR	Ingeborg Mello; Argentina	34.60	Christel Balde; Chile	34.53
Javelin throw	Edith Klempau; Chile	34.19	Ilse Caro; Argentina	34.17	Mercedes Martín; Chile	33.02

== Medal table ==
Rank	Nation	Gold	Silver	Bronze	Total
1	Chile (CHI)	19	16	16	51
2	Argentina (ARG)	11	12	12	35
3	Peru (PER)	2	3	1	6
4	Uruguay (URU)	1	2	1	4
5	Bolivia (BOL)	0	0	3	3
Totals (5 entries)		33	33	33	99
