= Albert Vandeweghe =

Albert or Al Vandeweghe may refer to:

- Al Vandeweghe (1920–2014), former professional American football player
- Al Vande Weghe (1916–2002), American competition swimmer and Olympic silver medalist at the 1936 Summer Olympic Games
