= Noemí Simonetto de Portela =

Argentine long jumper (1926–2011)

Noemí Simonetto
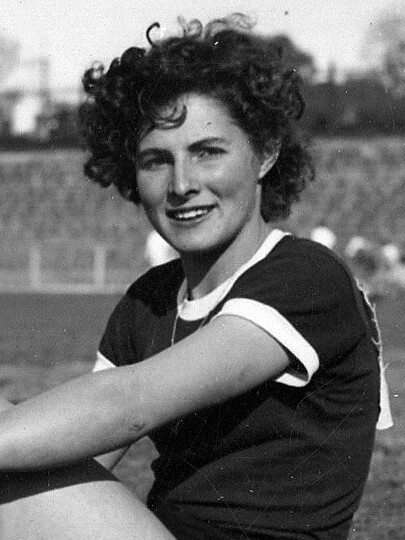
- Simonetto in 1942

Personal information
- Full name: Noemí Simonetto de Portela
- Born: 1 February 1926 (age 100) Buenos Aires, Argentina
- Died: 20 February 2011 (aged 85) Buenos Aires, Argentina
- Height: 1.71 m (5 ft 7 in)
- Weight: 62 kg (137 lb)

Sport
- Sport: Athletics
- Events: 100 metres, 80 metres hurdles, high jump, long jump
Medal record
Women's athletics
Representing Argentina
Olympic Games
Silver medal – second place	1948 London	Long jump

Noemí Simonetto de Portela (February 1, 1926 – February 20, 2011) was an Argentine athlete who competed mainly in the long jump.

== Biography ==
Born in Avellaneda, Argentina on February 1, 1926, she competed for Argentina at the 1948 Summer Olympics held in London, England in the long jump. She won the silver medal in the said tournament.

She won 17 medals (11 gold) at the South American Championships in Athletics in the years 1941, 1943, 1945 and 1947.

She died in Buenos Aires, Argentina on February 20, 2011, aged 85.

== Personal bests ==
- 100 metres – 12.2h (1947)
- 80 metres hurdles – 11.5h (1944)
- High jump – 1.60 (Buenos Aires 1946)
- Long jump – 5.76 (San Fernand0 1945)
