= Erwin Simon =

German swimmer

Personal information
- Born: 24 September 1908 Gladbeck, Germany
- Died: 20 September 1959 (aged 50) Caracas, Venezuela

Sport
- Sport: Swimming

Erwin Simon (24 September 1908 – 20 September 1959) was a German swimmer. He competed in the men's 100 metre backstroke at the 1936 Summer Olympics.
