= Antonio Cuba =

Peruvian sprinter (born 1914)

Personal information
- Nationality: Peruvian
- Born: Antonio Cuba; 10 December 1914

Sport
- Sport: Sprinting
- Event: 100 metres
Medal record
Men's athletics
Representing Peru
South American Championships
Silver medal – second place	1939 Lima	400 m
Bronze medal – third place	1941 Buenos Aires	400 m
Bolivarian Games
Gold medal – first place	1938 Bogotá	400 m

Antonio Cuba (born 10 December 1914, date of death unknown) was a Peruvian sprinter. He competed for Peru during the 1930s and '40s, and competed for them in the men's 100 metres at the 1936 Summer Olympics. Aside from this, he found success in regional tournaments. He won a gold medal at the Bolivarian Games and a silver and bronze medal at the South American Championships in Athletics.

== Biography ==
Antonio Cuba was born on 10 December 1914 in Peru. As an athlete, he represented Peru in international competition as a sprinter from the mid-1930s until the early 1940s. Cuba was selected to compete for Peru at the 1936 Summer Olympics in Berlin, Germany. Prior to this, he held a personal best of 11 seconds in the 100 metres, which was set in 1935. He competed in the preliminary heats of the men's 100 metres on 2 August in the fourth heat against five other sprinters. There, he placed fifth and did not run a fast enough time to progress further into the quarterfinals. He was also entered in the men's 200 metres and men's 400 metres but did not compete in either event.

After the 1936 Summer Games, he competed at the 1938 Bolivarian Games, the first edition of the Games, which was held in Bogotá, Colombia. He competed in the men's 400 metres and recorded a time of 51.2 seconds, winning the gold medal by 0.4 seconds. After the Bolivarian Games, he found success at the South American Championships in Athletics. At the 1939 South American Championships in Athletics held in Lima, Peru, he won silver in the men's 400 metres with a time of 49.4 seconds. He then competed in the 1941 South American Championships in Athletics held in Buenos Aires, Argentina, and won the bronze medal in the same event with a time of 50.4 seconds.
