= Piet Metman =

Dutch swimmer

Personal information
- Born: 14 June 1916 Sukabumi, Dutch East Indies
- Died: 28 March 1990 (aged 73) Arnhem, Netherlands

Sport
- Sport: Swimming

Piet Metman (14 June 1916 – 28 March 1990) was a Dutch swimmer. He competed in the men's 100 metre backstroke at the 1936 Summer Olympics.
