= Taylor Drysdale =

American swimmer and coach

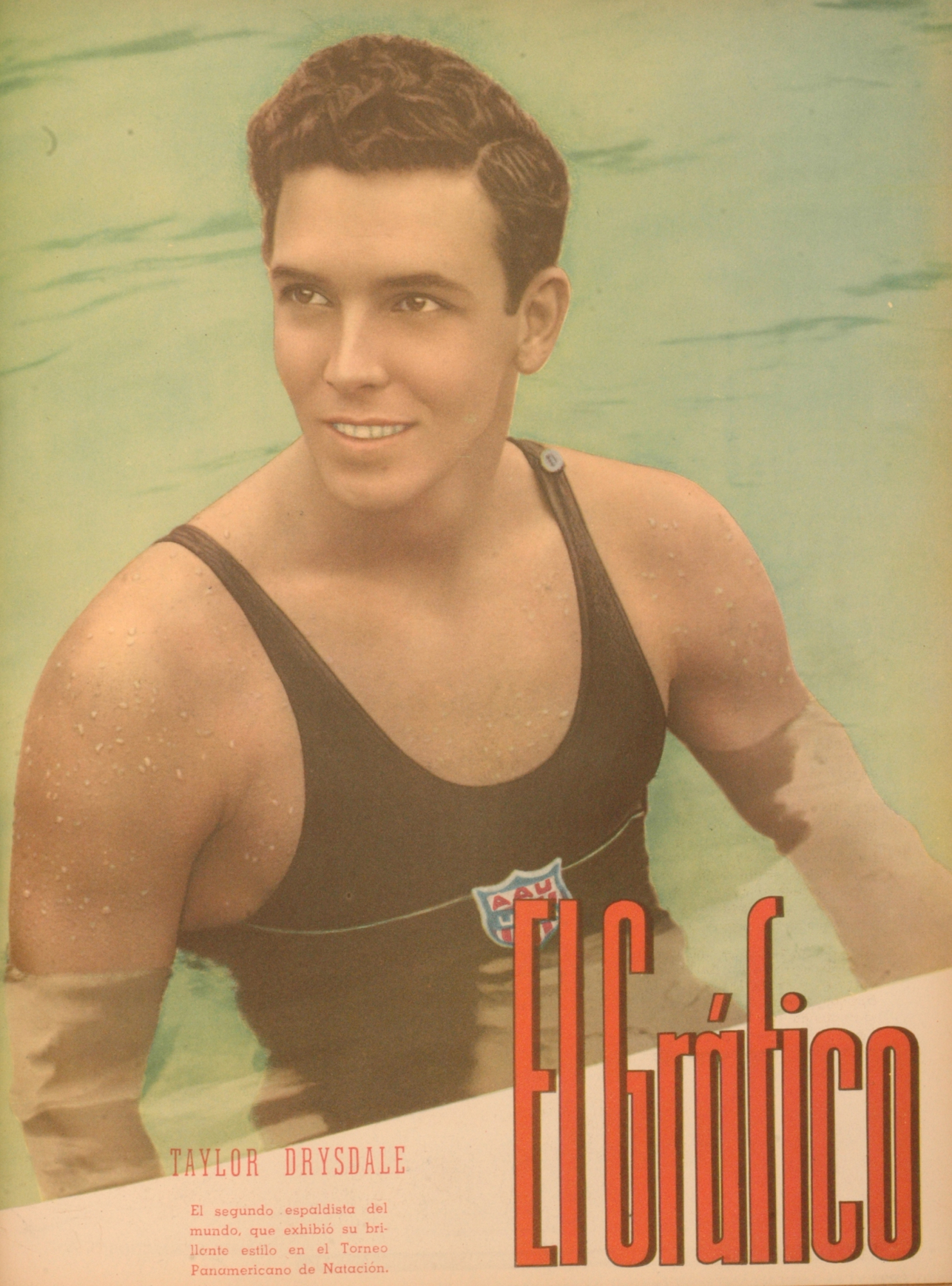
- Drysdale in El Gráfico in 1940

Personal information
- National team: United States
- Born: January 14, 1914 Indianapolis, Indiana, U.S.
- Died: February 9, 1997 (aged 83) Orlando, Florida, U.S.

Sport
- Sport: Swimming
- Strokes: Backstroke
- Club: Detroit Athletic Club
- College team: University of Michigan
- Coach: Matthew Mann; U. Michigan

Taylor Drysdale (January 14, 1914 – February 9, 1997) was an American competition swimmer and swimming coach. Drysdale represented the United States at the 1936 Summer Olympics in Berlin, Germany. He competed in the men's 100-meter backstroke, and finished fourth in the event final with a time of 1:09.4.

Drysdale attended the University of Michigan, where he was a member of the Michigan Wolverines swimming and diving team under Hall of Fame Coach Matthew Mann in National Collegiate Athletic Association (NCAA) competition from 1932 to 1935. During his college swimming career, he won three individual NCAA national championships in the 150-yard backstroke (1932, 1934, 1935), and was also a member of Michigan's NCAA-winning teams in the 300-yard medley relay (1932, 1935) and 400-yard freestyle relay (1935).

He later earned master's degrees in nuclear physics and mathematics from the University of Michigan, joined the U.S. military, worked on the Manhattan Project, and retired from the U.S. Air Force as a colonel. He was also the manager of the 1956 U.S. Olympic swim team.

Drysdale was inducted into the International Swimming Hall of Fame as an "Honor Pioneer Swimmer" in 1994. He died in 1997; he was 83 years old.

== See also ==
- List of members of the International Swimming Hall of Fame
- List of University of Michigan alumni
