= Juan Fuse =

Argentine athletics competitor

Personal information
- Full name: Juan Fuse Fassi
- Born: 21 February 1905 Junín, Argentina
- Died: 31 October 1984 (aged 79) Junín, Argentina
- Height: 1.77 m (5 ft 10 in)
- Weight: 100 kg (220 lb)

Sport
- Sport: Athletics
- Event: Hammer throw

Juan Fuse Fassi (21 February 1905 – 31 October 1984) represented Argentina at the 1948 Summer Olympics in London. He competed in the hammer throw, finishing 20th. His personal best is 52.67m in 1940.

== International competitions ==
Year	Competition	Venue	Position	Event	Notes
Representing Argentina
1933	South American Championships	Montevideo, Uruguay	3rd	Hammer throw	45.00 m
1937	South American Championships	São Paulo, Brazil	3rd	Hammer throw	48.38 m
1939	South American Championships	Lima, Peru	1st	Hammer throw	49.77 m
1941	South American Championships	Buenos Aires, Argentina	2nd	Hammer throw	48.98 m
1943	South American Championships	Santiago, Chile	2nd	Hammer throw	46.06 m
1945	South American Championships	Montevideo, Uruguay	1st	Hammer throw	48.33 m
1946	South American Championships (unofficial)	Santiago, Chile	2nd	Hammer throw	48.67 m
1947	South American Championships	Rio de Janeiro, Brazil	2nd	Hammer throw	47.95 m
1948	Olympic Games	London, United Kingdom	20th (q)	Hammer throw	46.95 m
1949	South American Championships	Lima, Peru	4th	Hammer throw	47.05 m
1951	Pan American Games	Buenos Aires, Argentina	4th	Hammer throw	45.35 m
1957	South American Championships (unofficial)	Santiago, Chile	6th	Hammer throw	45.75 m

== Personal bests ==
- Hammer throw – 52.67 (Buenos Aires 1940)
