= Hans Schwarz (swimmer) =

German swimmer

Personal information
- Born: 16 September 1912 Weißenfels, Germany
- Died: 9 December 1996 (aged 84) Bad Honnef, Germany

Sport
- Sport: Swimming

Hans Schwarz (16 September 1912 – 9 December 1996) was a German swimmer. He competed in the men's 100 metre backstroke at the 1936 Summer Olympics.
