= Al Vande Weghe =

American swimmer (1916–2002)

- Vande Weghe circa 1940

Personal information
- Full name: Albert Joseph Vande Weghe
- National team: United States
- Born: July 28, 1916 Rockaway Beach, New York, U.S.
- Died: August 13, 2002 (aged 86) Tulsa, Oklahoma, U.S.
- Spouse: Peggy Vivian King
- Children: 3

Sport
- Sport: Swimming
- Strokes: Backstroke
- Club: Newark Athletic Club (NAC)
- College team: Princeton University '40
- Coach: Maxwell Vogt (NAC); Robert Kiphuth ('36 Olympics); Howard W. Stepp (Princeton)
Medal record
Representing the United States
Olympic Games
Silver medal – second place	1936 Berlin	100 m backstroke

Albert Joseph Vande Weghe (sometimes appearing as Vandeweghe; July 28, 1916 – August 13, 2002) was an American competition swimmer for Princeton University, a world record holder in backstroke events, and a 1936 Berlin Olympic silver medalist in the Men's 100 meter backstroke. After graduating from Princeton in 1940, he worked thirty-five years as a Chemical Engineer for Dupont Corporation, then after retiring in 1975, returned to swimming at age 74 in 1980 as a United States Masters swimmer for Tulsa Masters, winning many races in age group competitions.

Vande Weghe was born to Mrs. Valentine DeBruyne Vande Weghe and Belgian-born Mr. Achiel Vande Weghe, a furrier, in Rockaway Beach, New York on July 28, 1916, one of around five children, but grew up in greater Paterson, New Jersey where he learned to swim at the local YMCA. An athletic family, Albert's sister swam for Patterson Central High and set state records, his brother Jerome swam and played football for St. Lawrence College, and his brother Robert swam from an early age, and competed for Rutgers. Albert's father Achiel was a soccer enthusiast and in his youth taught children to swim as an avocation.

== High school era swimming ==
Albert attended Patterson Central High School, which has since been renamed. He represented his High School team as a diver in his Freshman year, then swam distance freestyle, before setting records in backstroke as a High School upperclassman. He swam representing Patterson Central High through around his Senior year in 1934 under Coach Clinton Cranmer. Swimming for the Paterson Central High team, Vande Weghe served as Captain by his Sophomore year, before he began representing the Newark Athletic Club, which was required for him to swim in National Meets.

At the Newark Athletic Club, he was mentored and coached by Maxwell "Mickey" Vogt, who would also work as an athletic director for the club, and had worked with Vande Weghe during his time as a swimmer with the local YMCA. Vogt would later coach Freshman swimming at Princeton from 1954-1969, and some believe Vogt originated the flipturn while a collegiate swimming competititor. As a High School Sophomore in 1932, Vande Weghe swam a third place, but highly competitive time of 1:08.4 in the 100 yard AAU Senior Backstroke event at the Newark Athletic Club in December 1932.

=== Hun Preparatory ===
In 1934–1935, Vande Weghe attended the Hun Preparatory School in Princeton, New Jersey, where he received a letter in Football in December 1934. By his Senior year, Vande Weghe had competed in Tokyo with an American team consisting of himself, Jack Medica and Art Highland, where he won the Japanese National Championship in the 100-meter swim defeating three members of the Japanese Olympic team. By 1934, he held a world age group record in the 200-meter backstroke of 2:33.2. Vande Weghe first broke the state record in the 100-yard freestyle with a time of 58.3, and the world record in the 100-yard backstroke with a time of 1:04.8 in Trenton New Jersey, at the combined State High School and Preparatory meet at the Trenton High School Pool on March 11, 1934. It is believed Vande Weghe first used the flip turn in his historic 150-yard backstroke record of 1:39.9 in 1934.

== 1936 Berlin Olympic silver medal ==
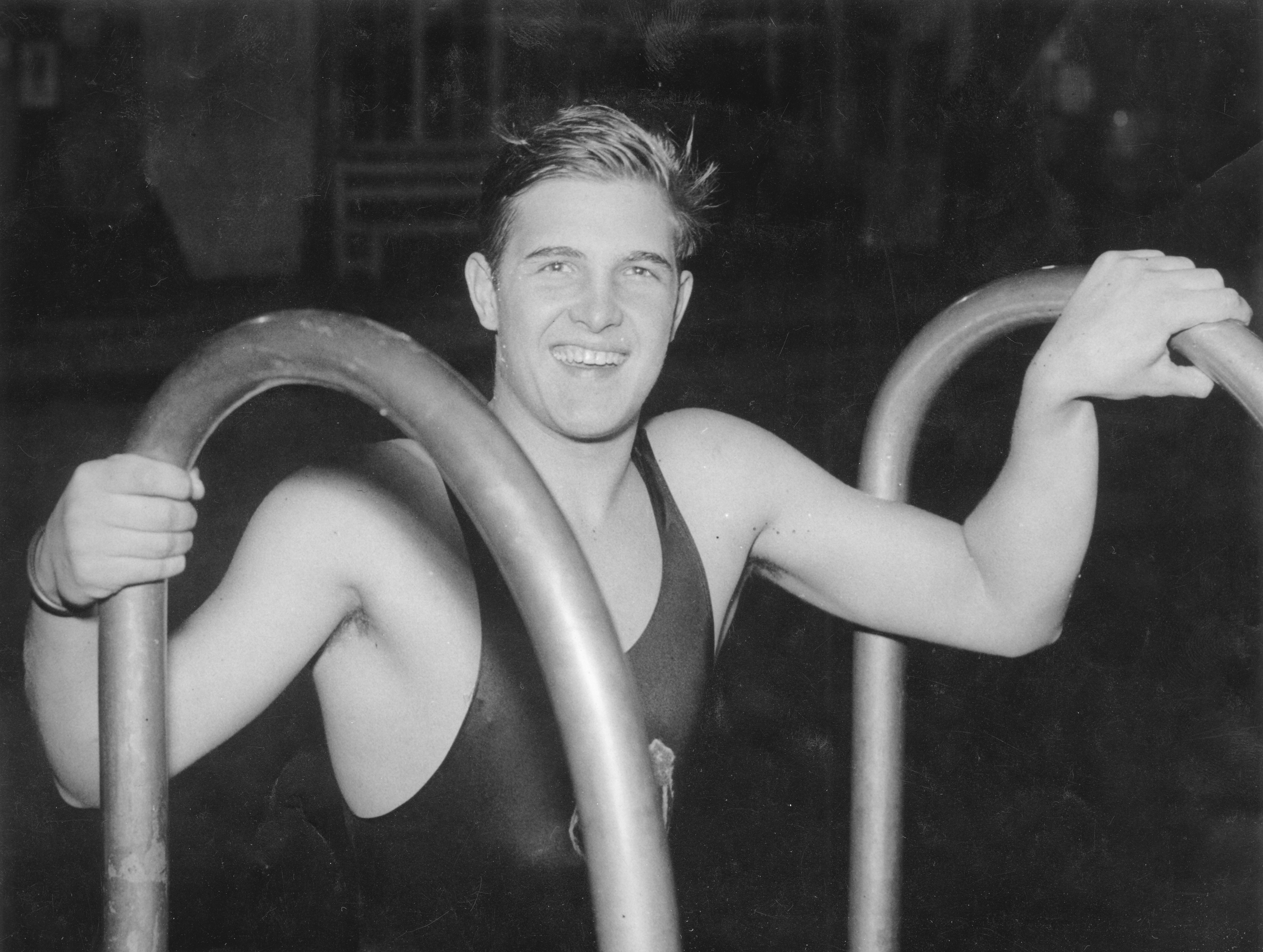
1936 Gold medalist Kiefer in 1935

As a 20-year-old at the 1936 Summer Olympics in Berlin, Germany, he won the silver medal in the men's 100-meter backstroke. Vande Weghe finished second behind fellow Hall of Fame American backstroker Adolph Kiefer and recorded a time of 1:07.7. Like Kiefer, Vande Weghe never achieved his full potential as a swimmer after his competition career was interrupted by military service during World War II. Kiefer had a clear lead at the 50-meter point, and was never passed during the race. He broke the Olympic record and was never seriously challenged by Vande Weghe. Vande Weghe passed former Japanese favorite Masaji Kiyokawa in the final portion of the race. Only a small crowd observed the race, due to bad weather and a conflict with the final of the handball competition. In Berlin, Vande Weghe was managed by Hall of Fame 1936 Olympic Head Coach Bob Kiphuth, a long serving coach at Yale. In late life interviews, Vande Weghe noted he believed Germany was trying to make a very positive impression in 1936 as the German government had a captive audience, and noted that the Olympic facilities were immaculate, and elaborate.

After the Olympics, Vande Weghe travelled to Poland and swam with the U.S. team in a very successful meet against the national Polish team in international competition.

== Princeton University ==
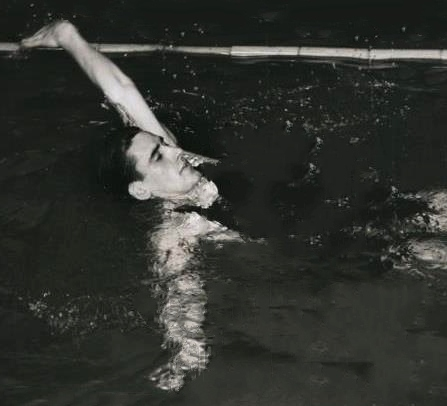
Swimming backstoke in 1938

After the Olympics, Vande Weghe attended Princeton University from Fall, 1936 through June, 1940, where he swam for the Princeton Tigers swimming and diving team under Head Coach Howard "Howie" Wellington Stepp who coached swimming at Princeton for 25 years. At Princeton, Vande Weghe helped pay for his partial athletic scholarship by working in the Tailor shop, which probably involved time fitting uniforms. He served as Vice-President of his Princeton Class of 1940, and President of the engineering class, as well as Secretary of the Quadrangle Club and was a member of the athletic council. He was the first Princeton swimmer to earn four letters in swimming, and the first to receive a major letter as a Freshman. Vande Weghe swam for four years without ever losing an event in a college dual meet, served as team Captain by his Senior year, and won the NCAA national championship in the 150-yard backstroke for three consecutive years in 1938, 1939, and 1940. With details following, Vande Weghe continued to break the World record for the 100-yard backstroke while at Princeton.

== Swimming highlights, records ==
In July 1940, Vande Weghe was the holder of all the Eastern Intercollegiate league and NCAA backstroke records. Approaching a time under one minute, Vande Weghe swam a 1:01 for the 100-yard backstroke while swimming for Hun Preparatory School at a meet at Rutgers University on Saturday March 3, 1934. His defining world record in the 100-meter backstroke of 1:04.8 was set at a New Jersey High School and Preparatory State Meet in Trenton, Jersey on March 10, 1934. On February 18, 1939, he set a world short course record of 59.41 in the 100-yard backstroke. This was one of six world backstroke records he set between 1934 and 1939, mostly occurring while he was swimming for Princeton University. At Princeton, Vande Weghe won the National Collegiate Athletic Association (NCAA) 150-yard backstroke title in his third straight year, posting a time of 1:34.6 in his Senior year in March, 1940. Vande Weghe had a total of nine National records in backstroke at Princeton and three American relay records while teaming with Princeton's Hall of fame breastroker Dick Hough, and Princeton's freestyle swimmer Hank Van Oss. The Medley relay records were also World Records and were largely in the 300-yard medley relay, an event no longer held since the introduction of the butterfly stroke in the 1950s. In 1938, Vande Weghe became the first person to swim the 100-yard backstroke in under a minute, and he became known for the competitive advantage he gained by adding the flip turn to the backstroke event.

=== Official world records ===
Vande Weghe's record in the 100 meter backstroke, set in Honolulu was 1:07.4, which lasted from 23 July 23, 1934 through 20 October 1935. Also set in Honolulu, his fastest 200-meter backstroke time was 2:27.8 which lasted from 30 August 1934 through 11 April 1935.

== Later life ==
Vande Weghe graduated from Princeton with a bachelor's degree in chemical engineering in 1940, then served as a WWII Naval veteran. He accepted a position with Dupont officially on July 8, 1940, immediately after graduating from Princeton.

He had a long career with Dupont Corporation, where he was an employee for over 35 years, remaining with the firm until 1975. He began his job with DuPont, originally working in the nylon research department in Charleston, West Virginia in 1940. He moved with the company to Orange, Texas, Wilmington, Delaware, and Parkersburg, West Virginia. Vande Weghe married Peggy Vivian King in Charleston on September 30, 1943. During his career, he lived on a cattle farm and raised fruit and nut trees with his son, two daughters, and wife Peg.

Continuing to work for Dupont, Vande Wegh became a resident of Tulsa, Oklahoma in 1967. In 1968, during his induction into the Paterson Old Timers Athletic Association, he was working as a Plant Superintendent for Tulsa's DuPont Plastic Plant.

Though not a frequent swimmer during his work years, he remained active playing golf and tennis.

After retiring from DuPoint in 1975, Vande Weghe returned to more serious swim training with United States Masters swimming beginning in 1980. In January, 1996, Vande Wegh had open heart surgery, but continued to stay active. Competing in his 70's and 80's, he captured national titles, including winning the 50 meters in 47.38 seconds at the age of 81 at Tucson's National Senior Sports Olympics. He was one of the eight original members that founded Tulsa Masters Swim Club and was on the Board of Directors of Oklahoma's Senior Olympics.

On August 13, 2002, Vande Weghe died of leukemia in Tulsa, Oklahoma at the age of 86. A memorial service was held on August 16 at Stanleys Funeral Service Chapel in Tulsa. He was predeceased by his wife of 56 years, Peggy King, who died of cancer in December 1999. A former drama major at Northwestern University, Peggy continued to perform in stage productions while living with the family in both Charleston, West Virginia and Tulsa, Oklahoma. He was survived by a son, two daughters, and a grand daughter.

=== Honors ===
Vande Weghe was inducted into the International Swimming Hall of Fame as an "Honor Swimmer" in 1990. In 1937 and 1939 he received the honor of being named New Jersey Collegiate Athlete and in 1940 was named Outstanding scholar athlete for Princeton. In May 1934, as a High School Senior, Vande Weghe was presented an award as "Paterson's Outstanding Athlete" by the Paterson Mayor's Committee. In 1934, after returning from his meet in Japan, a bronze plaque, presented by Paterson Mayor Hincliffe, was dedicated to the swimming achievements of Vande Weghe at the Hinchcliffe Football Stadium in Paterson. In 1940, Vande Weghe was awarded the William W. Roper trophy at Princeton for outstanding achievement in academics, and athletics.

== See also ==
- List of members of the International Swimming Hall of Fame
- List of Olympic medalists in swimming (men)
- List of Princeton University Olympians
- List of Princeton University people
