= Kiichi Yoshida =

Japanese swimmer

Personal information
- Born: 6 March 1919
- Died: 21 December 1944 (aged 25) Mindanao, Philippines

Sport
- Sport: Swimming

Kiichi Yoshida (吉田 喜一, Yoshida Kiichi; 6 March 1919 – 21 December 1944) was a Japanese swimmer. He competed in the men's 100 metre backstroke at the 1936 Summer Olympics. He was killed in action during World War II.
