= Yasuhiko Kojima =

Japanese swimmer

Personal information
- Native name: 児島 泰彦
- Nationality: Japanese
- Born: 1 September 1918 Hiroshima, Japan
- Died: 20 June 1945 (aged 26) Okinawa, Japan

Sport
- Sport: Swimming

Yasuhiko Kojima (児島 泰彦, Kojima Yasuhiko; 1 September 1918 – 12 June 1945) was a Japanese swimmer. He competed in the men's 100 metre backstroke at the 1936 Summer Olympics. He was killed in action during World War II in the Battle of Okinawa.
