= Otacílio =

Otacílio is a Portuguese given name (sometimes surname); it may refer to:

- Otacílio Mariano Neto (born 1982), Brazilian footballer
- Otacílio Gonçalves (1940–2025), Brazilian football manager
- Otacílio Jales da Silva (born 1984), Brazilian footballer
- Cilinho, real name Otacílio Pires de Camargo, Brazilian football manager
