= Manuel Consiglieri =

Peruvian discus thrower (1915–2002)

Personal information
- Full name: Manuel Eugenio Consigliere Mayorga
- Born: 15 November 1915 Lima, Peru
- Died: 2002 (aged 86–87)
- Height: 1.87
- Weight: 94 kg (207 lb)

Sport
- Sport: Athletics
- Event: Discus throw

Manuel Eugenio Consigliere Mayorga (15 November 1915 – 2002) was a Peruvian athlete. He competed in the men's discus throw at the 1948 Summer Olympics. Consiglieri died in 2002.

== International competitions ==
| Year | Competition | Venue | Position | Event | Notes |
Representing Peru
| 1935 | South American Championships | Santiago, Chile | 3rd | Discus throw | 39.67 m |
| 1938 | Bolivarian Games | Bogotá, Colombia | 1st | Shot put | 12.90 m |
| 1938 | Bolivarian Games | Bogotá, Colombia | 1st | Discus throw | 42.01 m |
| 1938 | Bolivarian Games | Bogotá, Colombia | 1st | Hammer throw | 40.20 m |
| 1941 | South American Championships | Buenos Aires, Argentina | 1st | Discus throw | 46.40 m |
| 1943 | South American Championships | Santiago, Chile | – | Shot put | ? |
| 1943 | South American Championships | Santiago, Chile | 1st | Discus throw | 44.43 m |
| 1947 | South American Championships | Rio de Janeiro, Brazil | 5th | Discus throw | 42.51 m |
| 1947 | South American Championships | Rio de Janeiro, Brazil | 11th | Hammer throw | 39.09 m |
| 1947 | Bolivarian Games | Lima, Peru | 2nd | Discus throw | 43.72 m |
| 1947 | Bolivarian Games | Lima, Peru | 2nd | Hammer throw | 42.38 m |
| 1948 | Olympic Games | London, United Kingdom | 17th (q) | Discus throw | 43.01 m |
| 1949 | South American Championships | Lima, Peru | 3rd | Discus throw | 44.14 m |
| 1951 | Bolivarian Games | Caracas, Venezuela | 2nd | Discus throw | 40.41 m |
| 1951 | Bolivarian Games | Caracas, Venezuela | 3rd | Hammer throw | 41.47 m |
| 1954 | South American Championships | São Paulo, Brazil | 6th | Hammer throw | 44.96 m |

== Personal bests ==
- Discus throw – 46.40 metres (1941)
