= Juan Reccius =

Chilean triple jumper (1911–2012)

Medal record

Men's athletics

Representing Chile

South American Championships
Gold medal – first place	1935 Santiago	Triple jump

Hans Werner "Juan" Reccius Ellwanger (April 9, 1911 – June 29, 2012) was a Chilean athlete who competed at the 1936 Summer Olympics in Berlin. He competed in the men's triple jump event, but did not advance beyond the qualifying round.

Born in Valdivia, Reccius graduated with a degree in engineering from the University of Chile in 1935, the same year that he was crowned South American champion in the triple jump, a title that his older brother Adolfo had held in 1920. As of 2011 he was the last surviving member of the Chilean delegation from the Berlin Olympics and he turned 100 on April 9, 2011.

== See also ==
- List of centenarians (sportspeople)
