= Emmanouil Mallidis =

Greek swimmer (born 1914)

Personal information
- Born: 1914

Sport
- Sport: Swimming

Emmanouil Mallidis (born 1914, date of death unknown) was a Greek swimmer. He competed in the men's 100 metre backstroke at the 1936 Summer Olympics.
