= Eusebio Guiñez =

Argentine long-distance runner

Personal information
- Full name: Eusebio Crispin Guiñez
- Born: 16 December 1906 Rivadavia, Argentina
- Died: 1 October 1987 (aged 80) Mendoza, Argentina

Sport
- Sport: Track & Field
- Events: 10000m & marathon

Eusebio Crispin Guiñez (16 December 1906 – 1 October 1987) was an Argentine long-distance runner. Born in Rivadavia, Mendoza, he competed in the 1948 Summer Olympics in the 10,000 metres, which he failed to finish, and the marathon, where he finished fifth. His highest international ranking was 16th in the 10,000 m in the 1946 season, with a time of 31:09.8 minutes.

At regional level, he won medals at five editions of the South American Championships in Athletics. At the 1933 South American Championships in Athletics he was a 10,000 m gold medallist and a bronze medallist in the 3000 metres and 5000 metres. He was a bronze medallist in the road race at the 1941 South American Championships in Athletics, a silver medallist in road race and cross country running at the 1943 South American Championships in Athletics, a silver medallist in road race and 5000 m at the 1947 South American Championships in Athletics, and finally a bronze medallist at the 1949 South American Championships in Athletics.

== International competitions ==
Year	Competition	Venue	Position	Event	Notes
Representing Argentina
1933	South American Championships	Montevideo, Uruguay	3rd	3000 m	NT
1933	South American Championships	Montevideo, Uruguay	3rd	5000 m	NT
1933	South American Championships	Montevideo, Uruguay	1st	10,000 m	33:08.0
1941	South American Championships	Buenos Aires, Argentina	3rd	32 km	2:03:42
1943	South American Championships	Santiago, Chile	2nd	32 km	1:45:53
1943	South American Championships	Santiago, Chile	2nd	Cross country	46:14.0
1945	South American Championships	Montevideo, Uruguay	–	32 km	DNF
1947	South American Championships	Rio de Janeiro, Brazil	2nd	5000 m	15:14.0
1947	South American Championships	Rio de Janeiro, Brazil	2nd	Road race	1:57:17
1948	Olympic Games	London, United Kingdom	5th	Marathon	2:36:36
1949	South American Championships	Lima, Peru	5th	5000 m	15:31.7
1949	South American Championships	Lima, Peru	3rd	20 km	1:09:10

== Personal bests ==
- 10,000 metres – 31:09.8h (1946)
- Marathon – 2:36:36 (1948)
