= György Erdélyi =

Hungarian swimmer

Personal information
- Born: 31 March 1923 Eger, Hungary

Sport
- Sport: Swimming

György Erdélyi (born 31 March 1923, date of death unknown) was a Hungarian swimmer. He competed in the men's 100 metre backstroke at the 1936 Summer Olympics.
