= Jack Middleton (swimmer) =

British swimmer (1917–2010)

Personal information
- Nationality: Great Britain
- Born: 28 April 1917 Tamworth, Staffordshire, England
- Died: 1 January 2010 (aged 92) Sutton Coldfield, West Midlands, England

Sport
- Sport: Swimming
- Strokes: Backstroke

Jack Middleton (28 April 1917 – 1 January 2010) was a British swimmer. He competed in the men's 100 metre backstroke at the 1936 Summer Olympics.
