= Héctor Berra =

Argentine athlete (1909–1977)

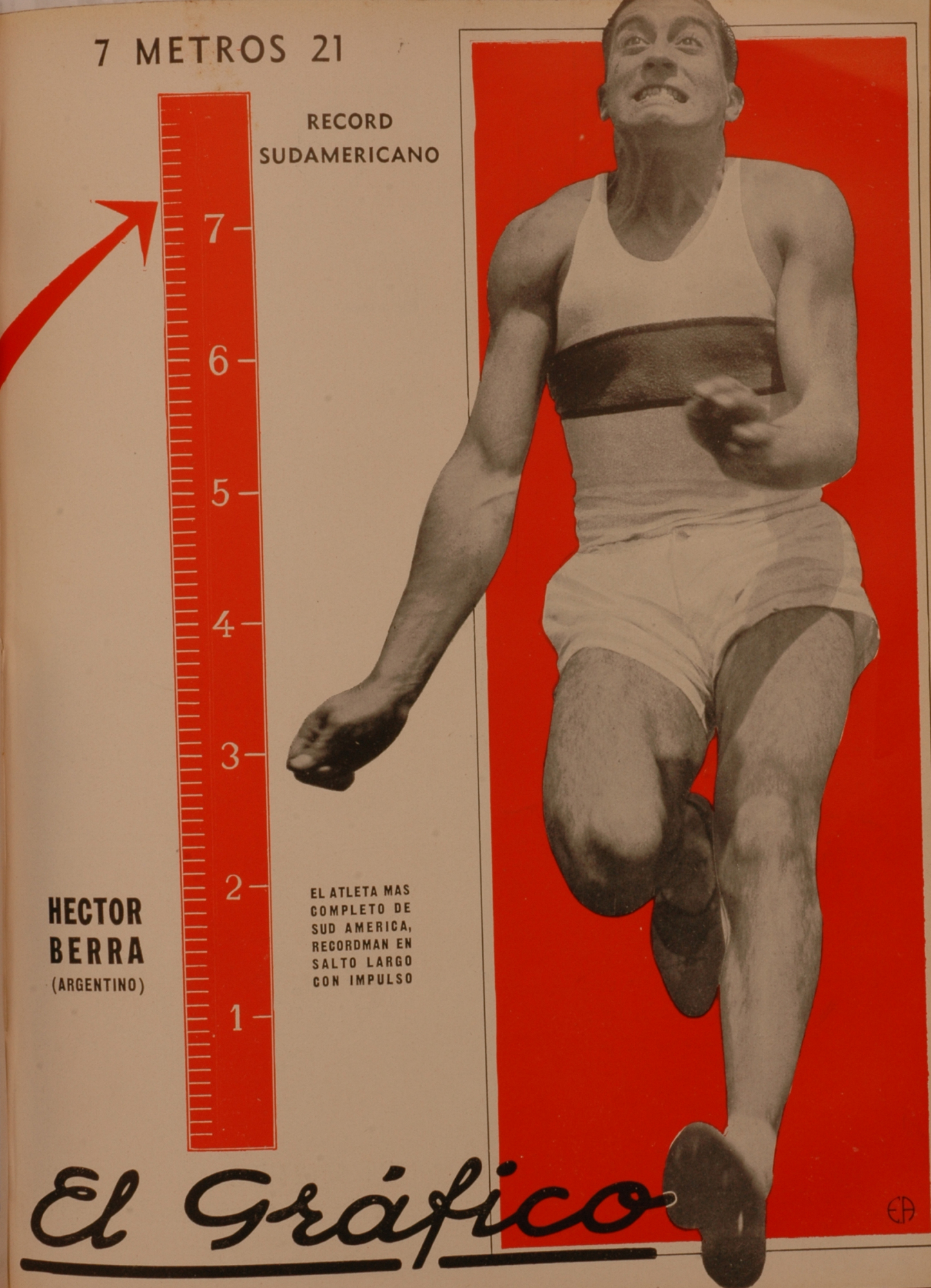
- Berra named "South America's most complete athlete" by El Gráfico

Personal information
- National team: Argentina
- Born: 23 September 1909 Buenos Aires, Argentina
- Died: 4 November 1977 Buenos Aires, Argentina
- Height: 187 cm (6 ft 2 in)
- Weight: 85 kg (187 lb)

Sport
- Sport: Track and field
- Events: 100 metres, long jump, decathlon, shot put
- Club: Club Atlético River Plate

Achievements and titles
- Olympic finals: 1932 Summer Olympics
- Personal bests: Long jump: 7,26 mt (1931, CR, NR); Shot put: 14,04 mt (1937); Decathlon: 7065.62 pt (1931, CR, NR)
Medal record
Gold medal – first place	1929 Lima	Decathlon
Gold medal – first place	1931 Buenos Aires	Decathlon
Gold medal – first place	1931 Buenos Aires	Long jump
Gold medal – first place	1933 Montevideo	Long Jump
Silver medal – second place	1937 São Paulo	Shot put

Héctor Berra (23 September 1909 – 4 November 1977) was an Argentine track and field athlete. He competed in the 100 metres, long jump and the decathlon at the 1932 Summer Olympics. He reached the finals in long jump and finished in the seventh position with a 6.66 meters jump.

Aside from his participation in the Olympic Games, Héctor participated in the South American Championships in Athletics representing Argentina in 1929, 1931, 1933 and 1937. He won 3 straight championships with the national team (1929/1931/1933), and 4 gold medals (decathlon in 1929/1931, and long jump in 1931/1933), one silver medal (shot put in 1937) and broke three South American records in the process (long jump in 1931/1933, and decathlon in 1931). His South American record in decathlon remained unmatched until the 1975 South American Championships in Athletics when his Argentine compatriot Tito Steiner won his first gold medal.
