= Alfonso Casasempere =

Chilean swimmer

Personal information
- Born: 9 April 1910
- Died: 6 July 1994 (aged 84)

Sport
- Sport: Swimming

Alfonso Casasempere (9 April 1910 – 6 July 1994) was a Chilean swimmer. He competed in the men's 100 metre backstroke at the 1936 Summer Olympics.
