= Miguel Castro (athlete) =

Chilean middle-distance runner (1910-1972)

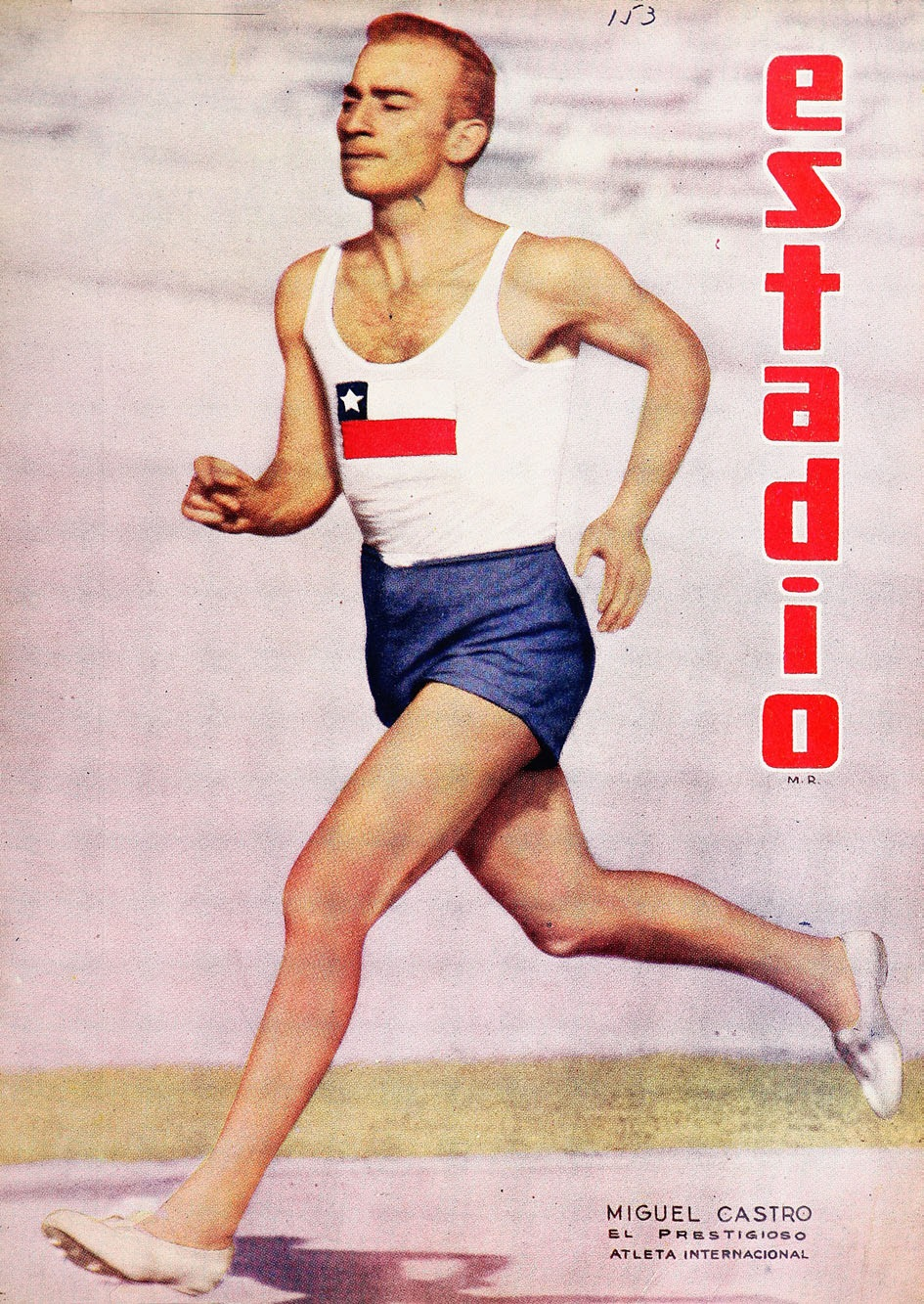

Personal information
- Full name: Miguel Ángel Castro Bascuñan
- Nationality: Chilean
- Born: December 12, 1910 Santiago, Chile
- Died: June 12, 1972 (aged 61)

Sport
- Sport: Middle-distance running
- Event: 1500 meters

Miguel Ángel Castro Bascuñan (12 December 1910 – 12 June 1972) was a Chilean middle-distance runner. He competed in the men's 1500 meters at the 1936 Summer Olympics.

== Olympic Career ==
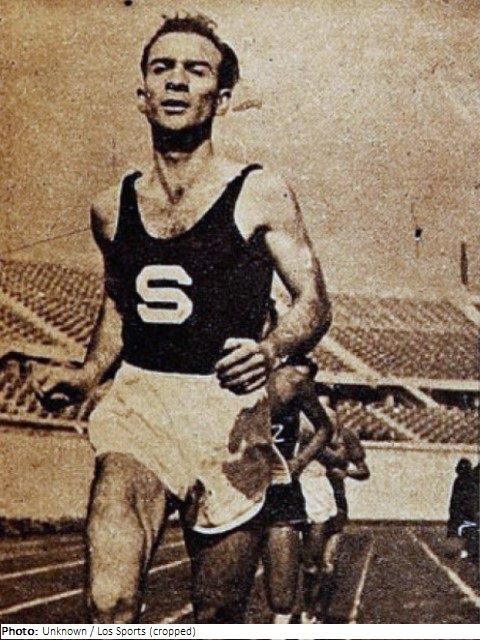
Castro in the 1500 metres, 1936 Summer Olympics, Berlin, Germany

At the 1936 Summer Olympics in Berlin, Germany, Castro ran the 1500 meters race and finished in three minutes 58.6 seconds, in tenth place in the second heat. He did not advance. He was also supposed to compete in the 800 meters event at the same Olympics but did not compete.

== International competitions ==
Year	Competition	Venue	Position	Event	Notes
Representing Chile
1935	South American Championships	Santiago, Chile	1st	1500 m	4:04.0
1935	South American Championships	Santiago, Chile	1st	3000 m	8:55.0
1939	South American Championships	Lima, Peru	1st	1500 m	3:57.6
1939	South American Championships	Lima, Peru	1st	3000 m	8:42.4
1939	South American Championships	Lima, Peru	1st	5000 m	15:06.0
1939	Olympic Games	Berlin, Germany	10th (h)	1500 m	NT
1943	South American Championships	Santiago, Chile	2nd	3000 m	8:35.0
1943	South American Championships	Santiago, Chile	2nd	5000 m	15:09.9
1946	South American Championships (unofficial)	Santiago, Chile	1st	3000 m	8:44.8
1946	South American Championships (unofficial)	Santiago, Chile	2nd	5000 m	15:17.6
1947	South American Championships	Rio de Janeiro, Brazil	?	3000 m	NT
1947	South American Championships	Rio de Janeiro, Brazil	?	5000 m	NT
1949	South American Championships	Lima, Peru	?	1500 m	NT
1949	South American Championships	Lima, Peru	8th	3000 m	NT
1949	South American Championships	Lima, Peru	?	5000 m	NT

== Personal bests ==
- 1500 metres – 3:56.8h (1938)
