= Leônidas da Silva (swimmer) =

Brazilian swimmer

Personal information
- Full name: Leônidas Francisco Marques da Silva
- Nationality: Brazil
- Born: 5 April 1914 Brazil
- Died: 18 April 1996 (aged 82)

Sport
- Sport: Swimming
- Strokes: Freestyle

Leônidas Francisco Marques da Silva (5 April 1914 – 18 April 1996) was an Olympic freestyle swimmer from Brazil, who participated at one Summer Olympics for his native country. At the 1936 Summer Olympics in Berlin, he swam the 100-metre and the 4×200-metre freestyle, not reaching the finals.
