= Olyntho Neto =

Brazilian politician (born 1986)

Member of the Legislative Assembly of Tocantins
- Incumbent
- Assumed office 1 February 2015

Personal details
- Born: 5 September 1986 (age 40)
- Party: Republicans (since 2022)

Olyntho Garcia de Oliveira Neto (born 5 September 1986), better known as Olyntho Neto, is a Brazilian politician serving as a member of the Legislative Assembly of Tocantins since 2015. In 2013, he was elected president of the youth wing of the Brazilian Social Democracy Party.
