= Moacyr Dunham =

Brazilian fencer

Personal information
- Born: 15 October 1910

Sport
- Sport: Fencing

Moacyr Dunham (born 15 October 1910, date of death unknown) was a Brazilian épée, foil and sabre fencer. He competed in five events at the 1936 Summer Olympics.
