= Heinz Schlauch =

German swimmer

Personal information
- Born: 11 November 1915 Gera, German Empire
- Died: 21 February 1945 (aged 29) Niederrhein, Germany

Sport
- Sport: Swimming
- Strokes: Backstroke
Medal record
Representing Germany
European Championships
Gold medal – first place	1938 London	100m backstroke

Heinz Schlauch (13 November 1915 in Gera – 21 February 1945 in Niederrhein) was a German swimmer who competed in the 1936 Summer Olympics. He won the 100 m backstroke at the 1938 European Championships in London. He was killed in action during World War II.
