= Børge Bæth =

Danish swimmer (1920–1981)

Personal information
- Born: 26 January 1920 Copenhagen, Denmark
- Died: 27 February 1981 (aged 61) Copenhagen, Denmark

Sport
- Sport: Swimming

Børge Bæth (26 January 1920 – 27 February 1981) was a Danish swimmer. He competed in the men's 100 metre backstroke at the 1936 Summer Olympics.
