= Lourenço Filho =

- Born: Manoel Bergström Lourenço Filho; March 10, 1897; Porto Ferreira, São Paulo, Brazil
- Died: August 3, 1970 (aged 73); Rio de Janeiro, Rio de Janeiro (state), Brazil
- Occupation: Educator

Manoel Bergström Lourenço Filho (March 10, 1897 – August 3, 1970) was a Brazilian educator and educational theorist. A key-figure in the Escola Nova movement, he had a major role in reforming public education in Brazil.

His work reveals several facets of the intellectual educator, extremely active and concerned about the school in its social context and classroom activities. Lourenço Filho was a supporter of eugenics, who believed that white people were superior to black people, concluding by means of "researches" that skin color was directly related to intellectual ability, saying that black children should study in separate rooms from white children.

== Biography ==
Born in the interior of the state of São Paulo, being the eldest of eight children, Lourenço Filho was educated by the influence of his father, the Portuguese Manuel Lourenço Júnior, a creative merchant and avid entrepreneur, married to the Swedish Ida Christina Bergström. As a boy, he was in contact with a vast literature, and became a compulsive reader.

== See also ==
- Paulo Freire
- Hélio Lourenço de Oliveira
