= Amarildo Filho =

Brazilian politician (born 1988)

Member of the Legislative Assembly of Goiás
- Incumbent
- Assumed office 1 February 2027

Personal details
- Born: 15 August 1988 (age 38)
- Party: New Party (since 2026)
- Relatives: Humberto Teófilo (brother)

Amarildo Pereira Filho (born 15 August 1988) is a Brazilian politician who was elected member of the Legislative Assembly of Goiás in 2026. He is the brother of Humberto Teófilo.
