= Sieglinda Zigler =

Brazilian swimmer

Sieglinda Lenk Zigler
Personal information
- Full name: Sieglinda Lenk Zigler
- Nationality: Brazil
- Born: July 16, 1919 São Paulo, São Paulo, Brazil
- Died: December 22, 1986 (aged 67)

Sport
- Sport: Swimming
- Strokes: Backstroke
Medal record
Women's swimming
Representing Brazil

Sieglinda Lenk Zigler (July 16, 1919 – December 22, 1986) was an Olympic backstroke swimmer from Brazil who participated at one Summer Olympics for her native country. She is the sister of Maria Lenk. At the 1936 Summer Olympics in Berlin, she swam the 100-metre backstroke, not reaching the finals.
