= Ricardo Vagnotti =

Brazilian fencer

Personal information
- Born: 16 October 1916
- Died: 13 June 1988 (aged 71)

Sport
- Sport: Fencing

Ricardo Vagnotti (16 October 1916 – 13 June 1988) was a Brazilian fencer. He competed in the individual and team foil and team épée events at the 1936 Summer Olympics.
