= Lodovico Alessandri =

Brazilian fencer (1903–1987)

Ferdinando Alessandri
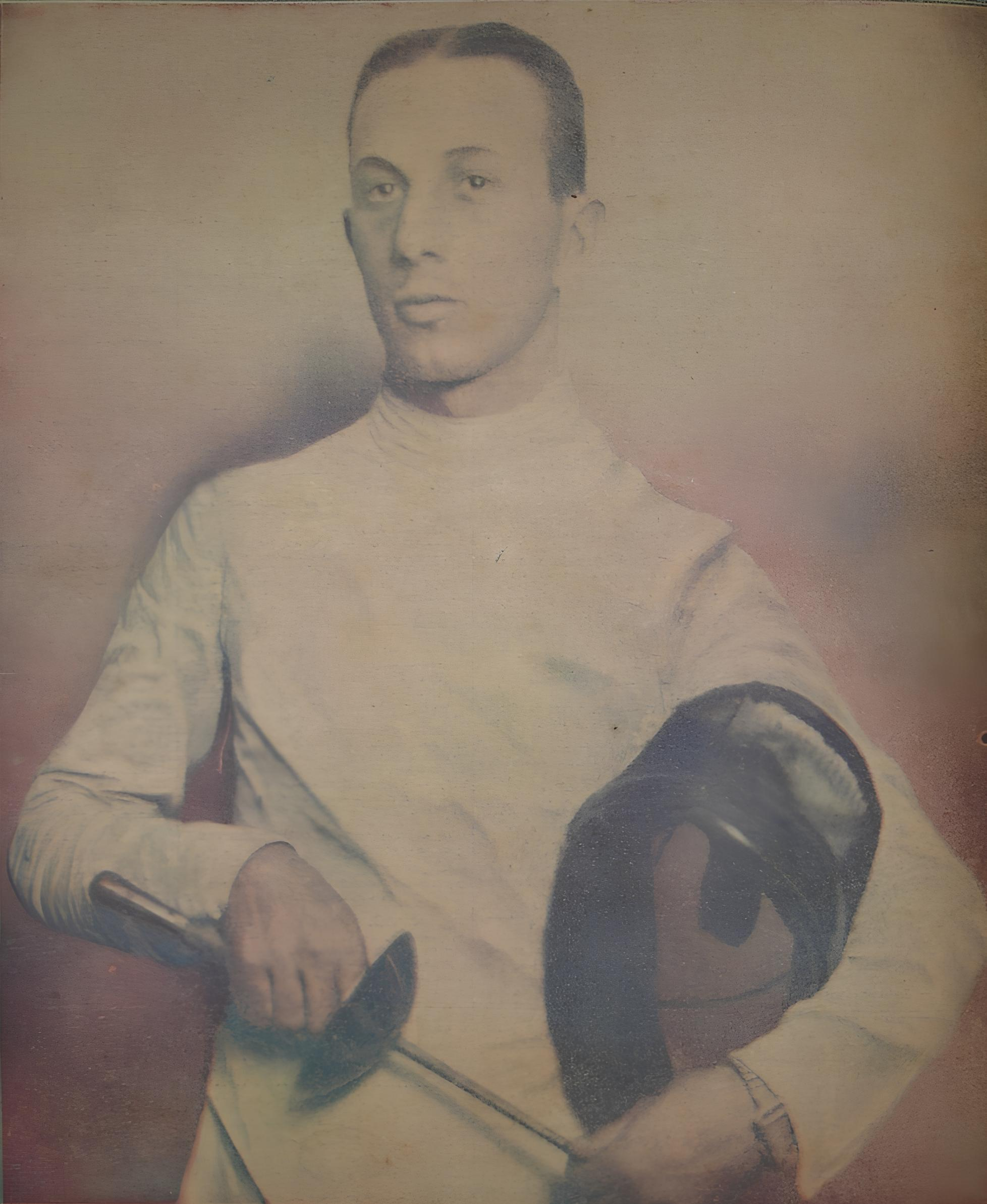

Personal information
- Full name: Ferdinando Ludovico Alessandri
- Born: 26 October 1903 São Paulo, Brazil
- Died: 26 March 1987 (aged 83) São Paulo, Brazil

Sport
- Sport: Fencing

Ferdinando Alessandri (26 October 1903 – 26 March 1987) was a Brazilian fencer. He competed at the 1936 and 1948 Summer Olympics.
