= Julius Edgar Arp =

Brazilian swimmer

Personal information
- Full name: Julius Edgar Barbosa Arp
- Nationality: Brazil
- Born: August 15, 1919 Rio de Janeiro, Brazil
- Died: October 5, 1996 (aged 77) Rio de Janeiro, Brazil

Sport
- Sport: Swimming
- Strokes: Breaststroke
Medal record
Men's swimming
Representing Brazil

Julius Edgar Barbosa Arp (August 15, 1919 – October 5, 1996) was an Olympic breaststroke swimmer from Brazil, who participated at one Summer Olympics for his native country. At the 1936 Summer Olympics in Berlin, he swam the 200-metre breaststroke, not reaching the finals.
