= Antônio Luiz dos Santos =

Brazilian swimmer

Personal information
- Full name: Antônio Luiz dos Santos
- Nationality: Brazil
- Born: July 16, 1914 Brazil
- Died: July 30, 2010 (aged 96)

Sport
- Sport: Swimming
- Strokes: Breaststroke
Medal record
Men's swimming
Representing Brazil

Antônio Luiz dos Santos (July 16, 1914 – July 30, 2010) was an Olympic breaststroke swimmer from Brazil, who participated at one Summer Olympics for his native country. At the 1936 Summer Olympics in Berlin, he swam the 200-metre breaststroke, not reaching the finals.
