= Olivier Da Lage =

French journalist (born 1957)

Olivier Da Lage (born 1957 in Saint-Cloud, France) is a French journalist.

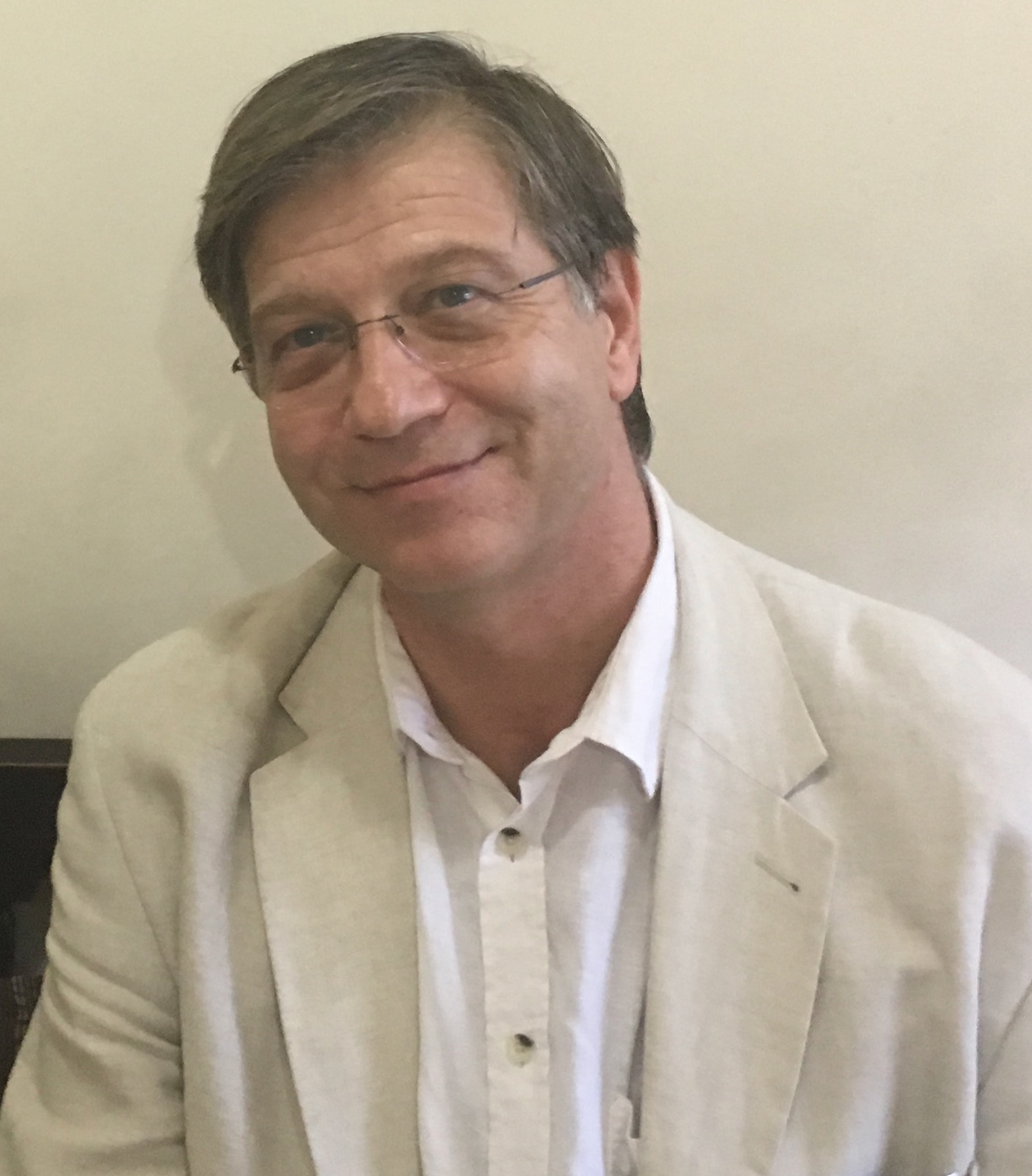
Olivier Da Lage

== Career ==
He graduated from Institut d’études politiques de Paris (Sciences Po) in 1978 and from the Centre de formation des journalistes (CFJ) in 1979.

After serving as press attaché at the French embassy in Bahrain (1979–1980), he was free lance Gulf correspondent for several French speaking media (1981–1982), based in Bahrain.

Back in France, he was awarded the Journalists in Europe fellowship and joined Radio France Internationale (RFI) in 1983 as Middle East correspondent.

In 1995, he was appointed deputy-editor in chief at Radio Monte Carlo Moyen-Orient (SOMERA), an Arabic speaking broadcasting corporation based in Paris. In 1998, he returned to the Foreign desk of RFI, covering the Middle East. From 2000 to 2005, he was deputy editor in chief of RFI's multimedia newsroom. In 2005, he was appointed RFI's Foreign editor and has been subsequently RFI's week-end editor in chief from 2010 to 2023.

He is currently associate researcher at IRIS.

Da Lage has published several books and numerous articles on the Middle East and the Arabian Peninsula as well as on India and is a regular lecturer at IRIS (Institut de relations internationales et stratégiques), a Paris-based foreign policy think tank, and has taught in several Journalism colleges on journalism ethics and Press law.

== Union activities ==
A member of the French National union of journalists (SNJ), he has chaired the Press card committee of which he was a member from 1993 to 2003.

He is also a member of AREG (Authors’ Rights Expert group) of the International Federation of Journalists (IFJ). In May 2007, at the IFJ congress in Moscow, he was elected as a member of the Executive Committee of the IFJ and in May 2010 at the Cadiz congress, as vice-president. He did not run for the vice-presidency at the Dublin Congress (June 2013) but was reelected at the Executive Committee.

In 2009, he took part in the drafting of the new ethical code of French journalists.

== Honours ==
He has been awarded "Chevalier dans l'Ordre des Arts et des Lettres" (2010).

== Books ==
Les Indiens et leurs langues, BiblioMonde, 2024

L'Inde, un géant fragile, Eyrolles, 2022

Nationalismes religieux - Moyen-Orient (dir.), L'Harmattan, 2020

Mr. Singh‘s rickshaw, KDP Amazon, 2019

L'essor des nationalismes religieux (dir.), Demopolis, 2018

Bombay, BiblioMonde, 2017

L'Inde, désir de puissance, Armand Colin, 2017

Aujourd'hui, l'Inde, (with Tirthankar Chanda), Casterman, 2012

Obtenir sa carte de presse et la conserver, 2nd ed., Victoires-Éditions, 2011

Ces trente ans qui ébranlèrent le golfe Persique, Éditions du Cygne, 2011

L'Inde de A à Z, (with Nina Da Lage), André Versaille éditeur, Bruxelles, 2010

Géopolitique de l'Arabie Saoudite, 2nd ed., Complexe, Bruxelles, 2006

The Politics of Al Jazeera or the Diplomacy of Doha (in «The Al Jazeera Phenomenon: Critical Perspectives on New Arab Media», Pluto Press, 2005

Maudite soit ta source, (with Jean-Paul Riondet), Michalon, 2002

Le Secrétaire général, (with Gérard Grzybek et Thomas Schreiber), Belfond, 1988

Golfe : le Jeu des six familles, (with Gérard Grzybek), Autrement, 1985
