= José Rezende Filho =

Brazilian writer

José Rezende Filho (1929–1977) is a Brazilian writer.

José Rezende Filho was born in Recife, in 1929. He spent most of his childhood in Carpina, in Pernambuco state, where he completed his elementary education.

He started his literary activity quite early in his life, founding a short-lived magazine, A Capital in Recife, when he was 17. Until his 20 years he had already written a few novels, like Os Irmãos Ravenas, Zelsica, and Doutores de Engenho, and the novellas O tenente Zé Falcão and O Colar Sangrento.

In 1950 he moved to Rio de Janeiro, where he was able to publish some of his short stories in newspaper and magazines.

He lived for ten years in Brasília, working as professional journalist and public servant.

He founded and published the magazine Sua Revista. Back to Rio de Janeiro, in 1969, he launched in the following year Dimensão Zero, and, in 1977, shortly before his death, published Tonico.

== Bibliography ==
- Os Irmãos Ravenas, novel
- Zesilca, novel
- Doutores de Engenho, novel
- O Tenente Zé Falcão, novella
- Colar Sangrendo, novella
- Dimensão Zero, novel, 1970
- Tonico, novel, 1977
