= Darcy Guimarães =

Brazilian hurdler

Personal information
- Nationality: Brazilian
- Born: 19 April 1915
- Died: 1 April 1981 (aged 65)

Sport
- Sport: Track and field
- Event: 110 metres hurdles

Darcy Guimarães (19 April 1915 – 1 April 1981) was a Brazilian hurdler. He competed in the men's 110 metres hurdles at the 1936 Summer Olympics.
