= Raquel Martínez (athlete) =

Chilean sprinter

Personal information
- Nationality: Chilean
- Born: 15 May 1908
- Died: February 1987 (aged 78)

Sport
- Sport: Sprinting
- Event: 100 metres

Raquel Martínez (15 May 1908 – February 1987) was a Chilean sprinter. She competed in the women's 100 metres at the 1936 Summer Olympics. She was the first woman to represent Chile at the Olympics.
