= Ruy Duarte (pentathlete) =

Brazilian modern pentathlete (1911–1990)

Personal information
- Born: 30 June 1911
- Died: 5 May 1990 (aged 78)

Sport
- Sport: Modern pentathlon

Ruy Duarte (30 June 1911 – 5 May 1990) was a Brazilian modern pentathlete. He competed at the 1936 Summer Olympics.
