= Guilherme Catramby Filho =

Brazilian modern pentathlete

Personal information
- Born: 2 May 1905 Rio de Janeiro, Brazil

Sport
- Sport: Modern pentathlon

Guilherme Catramby Filho (born 2 May 1905, date of death unknown) was a Brazilian modern pentathlete. He competed at the 1936 Summer Olympics.
