= José Farías (athlete) =

Peruvian long-distance runner

Personal information
- Nationality: Peruvian
- Born: 20 October 1909
- Died: 8 June 1964 (aged 54)

Sport
- Sport: Long-distance running
- Event: Marathon

José Farías (20 October 1909 – 8 June 1964) was a Peruvian long-distance runner. He competed in the marathon at the 1936 Summer Olympics.
