= Aluizio Lage =

Brazilian swimmer (1919–1974)

Personal information
- Full name: Aluizio Courrage Lage
- Nationality: Brazil
- Born: 11 March 1919 Rio de Janeiro, Brazil
- Died: 18 June 1974 (aged 55) Rio de Janeiro, Brazil

Sport
- Sport: Swimming
- Strokes: Freestyle

Aluizio Courrage Lage (11 March 1919 – 18 June 1974) was an Olympic freestyle swimmer from Brazil, who participated at one Summer Olympics for his native country. At the 1936 Summer Olympics in Berlin, he swam the 400-metre and the 4×200-metre freestyle, not reaching the finals.
