= Adolph Kiefer =

American swimming 1936 Olympic medalist

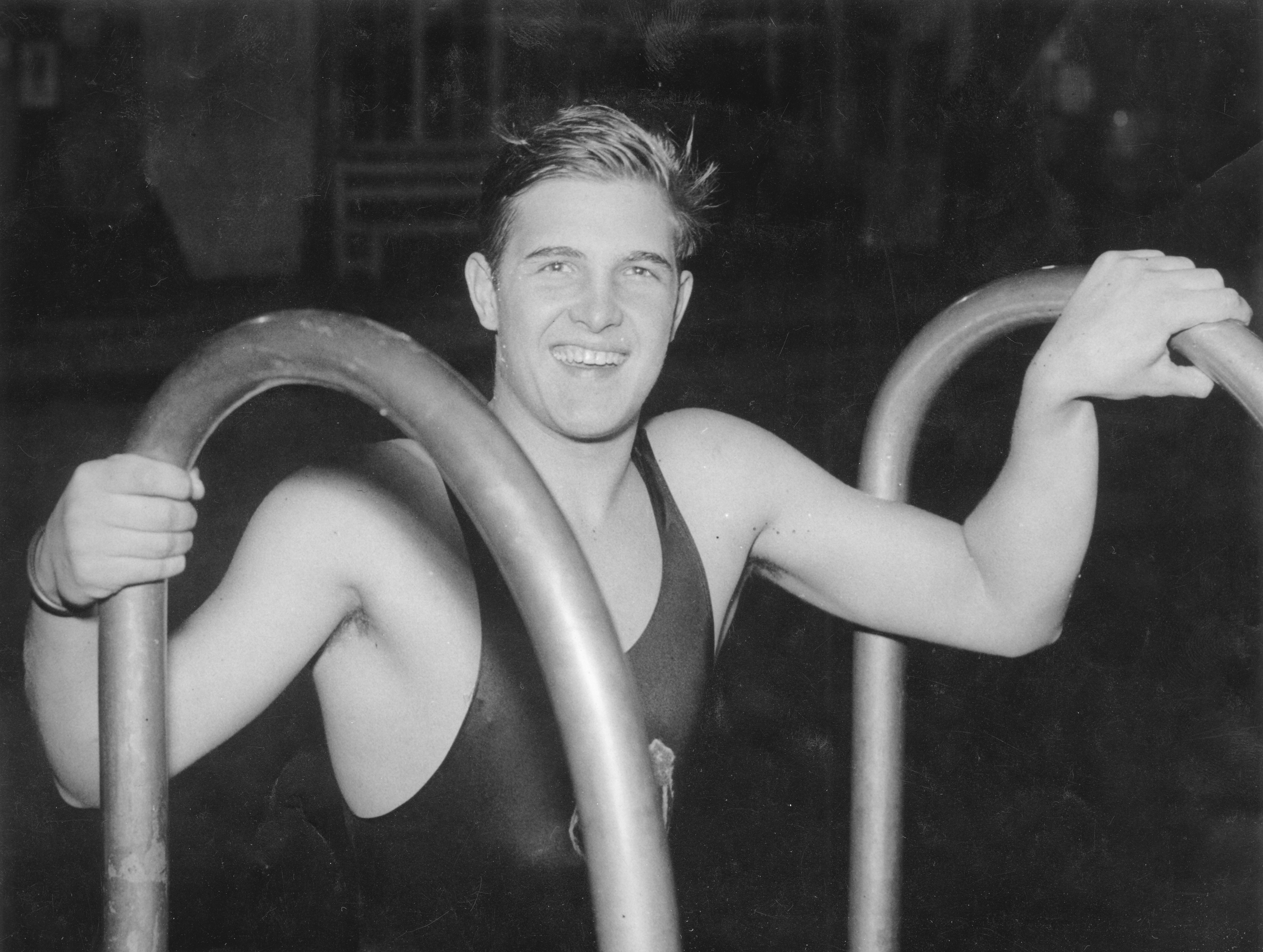
- Kiefer in Vienna in 1935

Personal information
- Full name: Adolph Gustav Kiefer
- Nickname: "Sonny Boy" "Old Man Kiefer"
- National team: United States
- Born: June 27, 1918 Chicago, Illinois, U.S.
- Died: May 5, 2017 (aged 98) Wadsworth, Illinois, U.S.
- Height: 6 ft 00 in (1.83 m)
- Weight: 165 lb (75 kg)
- Spouse: Joyce Kainer m1941

Sport
- Sport: Swimming
- Strokes: Backstroke
- Club: Lake Shore Athletic Club
- College team: University of Texas
- Coach: Stan Brauninger (Lake Shore); Tex Robertson (U Texas)
Medal record
Representing the United States
Olympic Games
Gold medal – first place	1936 Berlin	100 m backstroke

Adolph Gustav Kiefer (June 27, 1918 – May 5, 2017) was an American competition swimmer who swam for the University of Texas, a 100-meter gold medalist in the 1936 Summer Olympics, and a former world record-holder in numerous backstroke events. He was the first person in the world to break the one-minute mark in the 100-yard backstroke. Kiefer was also an inventor of new products related to aquatics competition and a founder of Adolph Kiefer and Associates, a swimming equipment company, in 1947.

== Early life and education ==
Kiefer was born as a son of German immigrants in Chicago, Illinois. His father had been a swim instructor in the German army and had worked as a candy vendor. He did some of his earliest swimming at one of the Sister Lakes in Michigan at the age of ten. While still a youth in Chicago, he swam with the Wilson Avenue YMCA, participating the well-known Gold Medallion swimming contest, where he swam the one mile event. He received some of his earliest swimming instruction at the Wilson YMCA. The following year, he enrolled at Von Steuben Junior High School on Chicago's North Side, where he had access to the school's indoor swimming pool, a coach, and a swim team. Kiefer attended Chicago's Roosevelt High School, graduating in June, 1936.

According to family and newspaper sources, around 16 Kiefer worked as a lifeguard during the summer at the Baby Ruth Pool during the 1933 Chicago's World's Fair where he first met Tex Robertson. At the time, Robertson had served as the Captain for the powerful University of Michigan swim team, and was working as a guide at the fair where the two met. Robertson observed and coached Kiefer that summer, timed him, and observed his stroke.

Around 14, in early 1933, Kiefer began training and competing with Hall of fame Coach Stan Brauninger at Chicago's Lakeshore Athletic Club and would later also swim at Brauninger's Medina Towers Club. When Kiefer's father died during Adolph's High School years, Brauninger legally adopted him and had him work the elevator at the Lakeshore Club as a part-time job. Brauninger, who coached five Olympians during his career, worked as Athletic Director and coached both swimming and diving at Lakeshore. According to Kiefer, he lived in the club and was always available to his swimmers.

=== University of Texas ===
Kiefer attended the University of Texas at Austin where he competed in swimming under former acquaintance Hall of Fame Coach Julian William "Tex" Robertson. In his Senior year around 1939, Kieffer received All America honors and helped lead the Texas swim team to the Southwestern Conference Championship. The 1939 swim team featured Kiefer, 1936 Olympic silver medalist and freestyle distance world record holder Ralph Flanagan, All-America backstroker Bob Tarleton, and team Captain freestyler Hondo Crouch. Coach Robertson is credited with helping Kiefer adopt a more efficient hand entry for the backstroke that extended at an angle of around 45 degrees from the trunk of the body, rather than the earlier position directly in line with the trunk. Kiefer later attended Columbia College, Columbia University (1940).

== 1936 Berlin Olympic gold ==
Eighteen-year-old Kiefer represented the United States at the 1936 Summer Olympics in Berlin, Germany. On August 14, Kiefer won the gold medal in the men's 100-meter backstroke. He set new Olympic records in the first-round heats (1:06.9), the second-round heats (1:06.8), and the event final (1:05.9). Kiefer had a clear lead by the 50-meter point in the event final, and never lost his lead, though his margin of victory over second place American Al Vande Weghe, silver medalist, was only around 2 seconds. His Olympic Record would stand for over 20 years, finally broken by David Theile in the 1956 Summer Olympics.

== Records ==
Kiefer became the first man to break the one-minute mark in the 100-yard backstroke while competing for Roosevelt High School as a 16-year-old in the Illinois High School Championships of 1935, swimming 59.8 seconds. His 1936 Illinois state championship backstroke time of 58.5 seconds was the Illinois state high-school record until 1960. On April 6, 1940, Kiefer set another world record, swimming the 100-yard backstroke in 57.9 seconds. He broke twenty-three records after breaking the one-minute backstroke mark. Kiefer set a world record for the 100-meter backstroke of 1:04.8 on January 18, 1936, at Brennan Pools in Detroit, Michigan.

Kiefer set world records in nearly every recorded backstroke event of his era, and captured national championships in the 3 stroke individual medley as well. His first backstroke record was not broken until 1950, after his retirement from competitive swimming in 1946. In indoor and outdoor competition, he captured a total of 18 American Athletic Union titles in the backstroke, as well as the freestyle, and the Individual Medley, though he clearly most excelled in backstroke.

== Post-Olympic swimming career ==
Kiefer returned home from the Olympics a national hero, and began traveling with other U.S. Olympic medalists on a tour of Europe, China, Japan, and South America, during which he challenged other swimmers in those locations to individual races.

In over 2,000 races, Kiefer lost only twice. At the National AAU swimming championship in April 1943, University of Michigan All-American swimmer Harry Holiday, Jr. finally went head-to-head with world-record holder Kiefer. Holiday beat him in the 150-yard backstroke at the AAU meet. The defeat was the first for Kiefer in eight years.

In his first two months of varsity competition, Holiday broke two of Kiefer's world records, lowering the 100-yard backstroke mark to 57 seconds and the 200-meter standard to 2:22.9. In August 1943, the NCAA also recognized Holiday as the holder of the new world record in the 150-yard backstroke with a mark of 1:31.5. Shortly thereafter, Kiefer auditioned for the role of "Tarzan", but joined the U.S. Navy instead.

== In the navy ==
Kiefer joined the U.S. Navy as a Chief Petty Officer in late 1943 and was initially assigned to the physical fitness and swimming division of the United States Navy's Bureau of Naval Personnel (BUPERS) as a Chief Athletics Specialist. When the Navy realized that it was losing more lives to drowning than to enemy bullets, Kiefer was appointed to a committee to set new guidelines for safety and training. He quickly moved through the ranks, becoming Officer in Charge of Swimming for the entire U.S. Navy, training over 13,000 navy swim instructors to do the "Victory backstroke", a term Kiefer coined himself. Victory backstroke was a simplified version of the modern backstroke that allowed novice swimmers to breathe easily (on their backs) while leveraging what Adolph considered to be a more buoyant stroke style for novice swimmers. Victory backstroke was performed with both arms underwater, sweeping down simultaneously (instead of using alternating arms), while using a freestyle kick. The American Red Cross would later add Victory Backstroke to their swim training protocols.

By the war's end, Kiefer had reached the rank of Lieutenant, Senior Grade.

== Business career ==
In 1947, he established Adolph Kiefer & Associates, Inc. in Chicago, which has provided swimmers with training, safety, and competition equipment. His brother, Edward Kiefer, was responsible for the development of the nylon tank suit in 1948 and debuted the first nylon swimsuit supplied to the U.S. Olympic Swim Team—a marked improvement over the wool and cotton suits available at the time. In 1966 he patented the first design for a no-wave, non-turbulence racing lane, a product that influenced future lane line design.

Kiefer subsequently devoted himself to community service, combining swimming and philanthropy. In national service to the community, he was appointed to John F. Kennedy’s Presidential Commission on Fitness and Industry in 1960, and served in the role in two other presidential administrations.

In the 1960s he worked with Mayor Richard J. Daley to build swimming-pools across the inner city of Chicago, providing the facilities needed for thousands of children to learn to swim. Kiefer actively supported Swim Across America, (SAA) a nonprofit organization that raises funds for cancer research, and participated in SAA public swimming events well into his 70s and 80s.

== Honors ==
Kiefer was an "Honor Swimmer" member of the inaugural class inducted into the International Swimming Hall of Fame in 1965.

He was inducted into the University of Texas Hall of Fame in 1982. In 2013 USA Swimming named Kiefer the "father of American swimming" in recognition of his contributions to the national swimming community.

In 2008 Kiefer celebrated his 90th birthday in Omaha at the 2008 U.S. Swimming Olympic Trials, where he awarded medals for the 200-meter backstroke. On June 27, 2012, he celebrated his birthday again in Omaha at the 2012 U.S. Swimming Olympic Trials—by awarding the medals for the 200-meter backstroke.

== Family ==
On August 29, 1941 in Chicago, Adolph Kiefer, 23, married Joyce Kainer, 21, then a member of a water ballet. The couple met while swimming with Kiefer's Coach Brauninger at Chicago's Towers Pool, where Brauninger coached the Medina "Towers" Swim Club. They had a long marriage, and had four children: sons Dale and Jack, and daughters Kathy and Gail.

On the morning of May 5, 2017, Kiefer died at home in Wadsworth, Illinois, at the age of 98.

== See also ==
- List of members of the International Swimming Hall of Fame
- List of Olympic medalists in swimming (men)
- List of University of Texas at Austin alumni
