= Otacílio Jales =

Brazilian footballer (born 1984)

Otacilio Jales
Personal information
- Full name: Otacilio Jales da Silva Neto
- Date of birth: 2 January 1984 (age 42)
- Place of birth: Mossoró, Brazil
- Height: 1.71 m (5 ft 7 in)
- Position: Defensive midfielder

Youth career
- Santa Cruz

Senior career*
Years	Team	Apps	(Gls)
2002–2005	Santa Cruz		
2006	Remo	26	(3)
2007	Eintracht Braunschweig	16	(1)
2007	São Caetano	12	(0)
2008	Náutico	0	(0)
2008	Gama	4	(0)
2009	Vila Nova	24	(0)
2010	Remo	0	(0)
2011	Mirassol	0	(0)
2011	Campinense	2	(0)
- * Club domestic league appearances and goals

Otacilio Jales da Silva Neto, known as Otacilio Jales or just Otacilio (born 2 January 1984) is a Brazilian former professional footballer who played as a defensive midfielder.

== Career ==
Otacilio is a youth product of Santa Cruz. In April 2006, he left for Série B club Remo and in January 2007 he joined 2. Bundesliga club Eintracht Braunschweig. The team was relegated at the end of season. Otacilio then left for São Caetano of Campeonato Brasileiro Série B in August 2007. He made his club debut on 7 September (round 24), replacing Gláucio in 72nd minute, winning Paulista FC 1–0.

In January 2008, he transferred to Náutico of Campeonato Pernambucano, but was released in May. In August he left for Gama of Série B. He just started once and collected three more substitute appearances for the club. Gama was relegated to 2009 Campeonato Brasileiro Série C at the end of season.

In February 2009, he was signed by Vila Nova on a one-year contract.

In February 2010, he was re-signed by Remo, agreeing a contract until the end of 2010 Campeonato Paraense or 15 June.

After being without a club for six months, he was signed by Mirassol on 7 December 2010. He was released prior the start of the 2011 Brazilian fourth division, for which the team qualified as São Paulo state championship second best team (seventh) that not played in any superior division above fourth division. The team also finished as the losing semi-finalists (first round) of 2011 Campeonato Paulista do Interior.

In July 2011, he joined the third division club Campinense but was released again in September, as the club failed to qualify to the stage two of the tournament.
