= Sylvio de Magalhães Padilha =

Brazilian athlete

Sylvio de Magalhães Padilha (Niterói, June 5, 1909 - São Paulo, August 28, 2002) was a Brazilian athlete and sports executive.

== Biography ==
Padilha competed in the 1932 Summer Olympics and the 1936 Summer Olympics as a track and field athlete. In 1948 Padilha retired to become a sports executive, leading Brazil's Olympic teams from 1952 to 1960, and the organizing committee of the 1963 Pan American Games. In 1963 Padilha became the president of the Brazilian Olympic Committee, and remained there until 1991, when he retired for health reasons. During 1971, he served as the acting president of Pan American Sports Organization for two months when his predecessor died in office. Padilha was also member of the International Olympic Committee since 1964, being its Vice-President from 1975 to 1978. Padilha died in 2002.
