= Raúl Muñoz (athlete) =

Chilean sprinter

Personal information
- Nationality: Chilean
- Born: 12 October 1915

Sport
- Sport: Sprinting
- Event: 400 metres

Raúl Muñoz (born 12 October 1915, date of death unknown) was a Chilean sprinter. He competed in the men's 400 metres at the 1936 Summer Olympics.
