= Antônio Amaral Filho =

Brazilian swimmer

Personal information
- Full name: Antônio Amaral Filho
- Nationality: Brazil
- Born: April 4, 1921 Brazil
- Died: January 24, 1988 (aged 66)

Sport
- Sport: Swimming
- Strokes: Backstroke
Medal record
Men's swimming
Representing Brazil

Antônio Amaral Filho (April 4, 1921 – January 24, 1988) was an Olympic backstroke swimmer from Brazil, who participated at one Summer Olympics for his native country.

At the 1936 Summer Olympics in Berlin, he swam the 100m backstroke and did not reach the finals.
