= Erwin Reimer =

Chilean decathlete

Personal information
- Nationality: Chilean
- Born: 29 May 1914
- Died: 23 April 1997 (aged 82)

Sport
- Sport: Athletics
- Event: Decathlon

Erwin Reimer (29 May 1914 – 23 April 1997) was a Chilean athlete. He competed in the men's decathlon at the 1936 Summer Olympics.
