= Ícaro Mello =

Brazilian high jumper

Personal information
- Nationality: Brazilian
- Born: 22 October 1913
- Died: 8 October 1986 (aged 72)

Sport
- Sport: Athletics
- Event: High jump

Ícaro Mello (22 October 1913 – 8 October 1986) was a Brazilian athlete. He competed in the men's high jump at the 1936 Summer Olympics.
