= Márcio de Oliveira =

Brazilian long jumper

Personal information
- Born: 27 November 1912 São Paulo, São Paulo, Brazil
- Died: 22 March 1978 (aged 65) São Paulo, São Paulo, Brazil

Sport
- Sport: Athletics
- Event: Long jump

Márcio de Oliveira (27 November 1912 – 22 March 1978) was a Brazilian athlete. He competed in the men's long jump at the 1936 Summer Olympics.
