= Alfredo Mendes =

Brazilian high jumper

Personal information
- Nationality: Brazilian
- Born: 7 November 1910
- Died: 7 November 1995 (aged 85)

Sport
- Sport: Athletics
- Event: High jump

Alfredo Mendes (7 November 1910 – 7 November 1995) was a Brazilian athlete. He competed in the men's high jump at the 1936 Summer Olympics.
