= Assis Naban =

Brazilian hammer thrower

Personal information
- Born: 4 December 1906 São Paulo, Brazil
- Died: 9 December 1998 (aged 92) Lake Park, United States

Sport
- Sport: Athletics
- Event: Hammer throw

Assis Naban (4 December 1906 – 9 December 1998) was a Brazilian athlete. He competed in the men's hammer throw at the 1936 Summer Olympics.
