= Birger =

- Gender: Male

Origin
- Language: Old Norse
- Origin: Birgir
- Meaning: "helper", "saviour", "protector"

Other names
- Variant forms: Birgir, Byrgir
- Derivatives: Börje, Børge

Birger is a Scandinavian name from Old Norse, bjarga, meaning "to help, to save, to protect". It is widely used in Norway as Birger but also as Børge. The Swedish variant of Birger would soon evolve into Börje, however, the prior form would remain common, and was not confused with its successor. The Icelandic form is Birgir. Birger is primarily a masculine given name, but can also be found as a surname.

== Birger ==
=== Given name ===
==== Middle Ages ====
- Birger, King of Sweden (1280–1321)
- Birger Brosa (died 1202), Swedish jarl
- Birger Gregersson (c. 1327 – 1383), Archbishop of Uppsala
- Birger Jarl (1210–1266), Swedish statesman
- Birger Persson (died 1327), Swedish magnate, knight, privy councillor and Uppland's first lawspeaker

==== Modern world ====
- Birger Amundin (1880–1965), Swedish rower
- Birger Andersson (disambiguation), several people
- Birger Andreassen (1891–1961), Norwegian cyclist
- Birger Åsander (1909–1984), Swedish actor
- Birger Asplund (1929–2023), Swedish hammer thrower
- Birger Bergersen (1891–1977), Norwegian anatomist and politician
- Birger Bergling (1903–1973), Swedish scenographer and costume designer
- Birger Blom-Kalstø (1940–2011), Norwegian politician
- Birger Bohlin (1898–1990), Swedish paleontologist
- Birger Braadland (1879–1966), Norwegian politician
- Birger Brandtzæg (1893–1971), Norwegian businessman
- Birger Breivik (1912–1996), Norwegian politician
- Birger Brekke (1891–1981), Norwegian Scout leader
- Birger Brodtkorb (1891–1935), Norwegian track and field athlete
- Birger Bühring-Andersen (1907–2001), Norwegian sport shooter
- Birger Carlstedt (1907–1975), Finnish artist
- Birger Cederin (1895–1942), Swedish fencer
- Birger Cnattingius (1875–1950), Swedish fencer
- Birger Dahlerus (1891–1957), Swedish businessman and amateur diplomat
- Birger Danielsson (1903–?), Swedish association football player
- Birger Dannevig (1921–1998), Norwegian journalist and historian
- Birger Ek (1911–1990), Finnish aviator
- Birger Ekeberg (1880–1968), Swedish jurist
- Birger Eklund (1929–2015), Swedish footballer
- Birger Ekstedt (1921–1972), Swedish politician and priest
- Birger Elmér (1919–1999), Swedish military and intelligence officer
- Birger Eriksen (1875–1958), Norwegian colonel who repelled the initial German World War II invasion force
- Birger Folke (1936–2020), Swedish tennis player and television commentator
- Birger Forell (1893–1958), Swedish Lutheran priest
- Birger Forsberg (1930–2007), Swedish motorcycle speedway rider
- Birger Furugård (1887–1961), Swedish politician and veterinarian
- Birger Gerhardsson (1926–2013), Swedish New Testament scholar and professor
- Birger Gotaas (1883–1960), Norwegian journalist, newspaper editor and non-fiction writer
- Birger Gröning (born 1975), German politician
- Birger Grønn (1898–1988), Norwegian engineer
- Birger Gustafsson (1874–1969), Swedish competitive sailor
- Birger Martin Hall (1741–1815), Swedish district medical officer and botanist
- Birger Halvorsen (1905–1976), Norwegian high jumper
- Birger Hatlebakk (1912–1997), Norwegian industrialist and politician
- Birger Haug (1908–1981), Norwegian high jumper
- Birger Hedqvist (1894–1964), Swedish lieutenant general
- Birger Hjørland (born 1947), Danish academic
- Birger Holmqvist (1900–1989), Swedish ice hockey and bandy player
- Birger Hønningstad (1904–1976), Norwegian engineer and aircraft designer
- Birger Jacobsson (born 1949), Swedish former footballer and football coach
- Birger Jansen (1948–2016), Norwegian ice hockey player and sailor
- Birger Jensen (1951–2023), Danish footballer
- Birger Johansson (1887–1975), Swedish diplomat
- Birger Johansson (1910–1940), Finnish canoeist
- Birger Kaada (1918–2000), Norwegian physician and neurophysiologist
- Birger Kaipiainen (1915–1988), Finnish ceramist and designer
- Birger Kajanus (1882–1931), Swedish botanist, geneticist, plant breeder and lichenologist
- Birger Karlsson (1926–2012), Finnish rower
- Birger Kildal (1849–1913), Norwegian attorney and businessman
- Birger Kivelä (1920–2013), Finnish diver
- Birger Knudtzon (born 1936), Norwegian retired rower
- Birger Lahti (born 1964), Swedish politician
- Birger Larsen (disambiguation), several people
- Birger Stuevold Lassen (1927–2011), Norwegian jurist, legal scholar and expert
- Birger Leirud (1924–1999), Norwegian high jumper
- Birger Lensander (1908–1971), Swedish actor
- Birger Lie (1891–1970), Norwegian sport shooter
- Birger Ljungberg (1884–1967), Norwegian military officer, politician and Minister of Defence from 1939 to 1942
- Birger Ljungström (1872–1948), Swedish engineer, technical designer, industrialist and inventor
- Birger Løvaas (1901–1977), Norwegian actor and comedian
- Birger Madsen (born 1982), Norwegian footballer
- Birger Maertens (born 1980), Belgian former footballer
- Birger Malling (1884–1989), Norwegian ophthalmologist and educator
- Birger Malmsten (1920–1991), Swedish actor
- Birger Meidell (1882–1958), Norwegian politician
- Birger Meling (born 1994), Norwegian footballer
- Birger Mörner (1867–1930), Swedish diplomat, author and book collector
- Birger Fredrik Motzfeldt (1898–1987), Norwegian aviator and military officer
- Birger Nerman (1888–1971), Swedish archaeologist, historian and philologist
- Birger Nilsen (1896–1968), Norwegian sport wrestler
- Birger Nilsen (gymnast) (1881–1981), American gymnast
- Birger Nordholm (1897–1989), Swedish-American founding director
- Birger Norman (1914–1995), Swedish journalist, poet, novelist, playwright and non-fiction writer
- Birger A. Pearson (1934–2025), American scholar and professor
- Birger Pedersen (born 1950), Danish footballer
- Birger Pedersen (Norwegian footballer) (1910–1969)
- Birger Peitersen (born 1945), Danish former football manager and player
- Birger Persson (footballer), swedish footballer
- Birger Rasmussen (1920–2007), Norwegian resistance fighter
- Birger Axel Rasmusson (1901–1964), Finnish chess player
- Birger Rosengren (1917–1977), Swedish footballer
- Birger Ruud (1911–1998), Norwegian ski jumper and alpine skier
- Birger Sandberg (1918–1998), Swedish football player and manager
- Birger Sandzén (1871–1954), Swedish-American painter
- Birger Schlaug (born 1949), Swedish author, public speaker, blogger and former spokesperson
- Birger Schmidt (born 1980), German lightweight rower
- Birger Simonsson (1883–1938), Swedish painter, illustrator and professor
- Birger Fredrik Sinding-Larsen (1867–1941), Norwegian military officer
- Birger Sjöberg (1885–1929), Swedish poet and songwriter
- Birger Skeie (1951–2009), Norwegian businessperson
- Birger Sörvik (1879–1978), Swedish gymnast
- Birger Steen (1907–1949), Norwegian association football player
- Birger Stenman (1925–1970), Swedish footballer
- Birger Stenman (gymnast) (1909–1989), Finnish gymnast
- Birger Strømsheim (1911–2012), Norwegian resistance member
- Birger Stuevold-Hansen (1870–1933), Norwegian politician
- Birger Tingstad (1939–2012), Norwegian football midfielder
- Birger Tvedt (1910–2002), Norwegian sports medical and physiotherapist
- Birger Var (1893–1970), Norwegian rower
- Birger Verstraete (born 1994), Belgian footballer
- Birger Vestermo (1930–2025), Norwegian cross-country skier
- Birger Vikström (1921–1958), Swedish writer and illustrator
- Birger Walla, Swedish bandy player
- Birger Warneby (1910–1958), Swedish association football player
- Birger Wasenius (1911–1940), Finnish speed skater
- Birger Wedberg (1870–1945), Swedish judge
- Birger Wernerfelt, Danish economist and management theorist

=== Surname ===
- Charles Birger (1881–1928), American bootlegger
- Hugo Birger (1854–1887), Swedish painter
- Jon Birger, American freelance writer, speaker and author
- Malene Birger (born 1962), Danish fashion designer
- Myriam Birger (born 1951), French musician
- Pablo Birger (1924–1966), Argentine racing driver
- Trudi Birger (1927–2002), German Holocaust survivor and writer
- Zev Birger (1926–2011), Israeli activist

== Birgir ==
Birgir is used in Iceland and the Faroes. In 2016, 1045 people had Birgir as a first given name in Iceland, and 285 had it as a second name.

- Birgir Ármannsson (born 1968), Icelandic politician
- Birgir Borgþórsson (born 1958), Icelandic weightlifter
- Birgir Finnbogason (born 1948), Icelandic handball player
- Birgir Guðlaugsson (1941–2007), Icelandic cross-country skier
- Birgir Hafþórsson (born 1976), Icelandic golfer and former player
- Birgir Ísleifur Gunnarsson (1936–2019), Icelandic politician
- Birgir Jakobsson (born 1948), Icelandic doctor and former basketball player
- Birgir Mikaelsson (born 1965), Icelandic basketball player
- Birgir Örn Birgis (1942–2017), Icelandic basketball player and coach
- Birgir Örn Birgisson (born 1969), Icelandic basketball coach and former player
- Birgir Björn Pétursson (born 1986), Icelandic basketball player
- Birgir Sigurðsson (disambiguation), several people
- Birgir Þórarinsson (born 1965), Icelandic politician

== See also ==
- Burger (disambiguation)
- Burgers (surname)
- Berger
- Burgher (disambiguation)
- Bürger
- Børge
- Börje
