= History of Sweden (1967–1991) =

This article describes the history of Sweden from the late 1960s until 1991.

== Rise of the left wing ==
During the mid-1960s, Sweden experienced a surge of left-wing activism, culminating in events such as the Båstad riots and the occupation of the student union building at Stockholm University. The Båstad riots occurred in May 1968 during a Davis Cup tennis match between Sweden and Rhodesia, where demonstrators protested against Rhodesia's participation due to its apartheid policies. The protest escalated into the most violent confrontation between Swedish police and demonstrators during the 1960s, involving the use of tear gas and water cannons. Shortly thereafter, in May 1968, students at Stockholm University occupied the student union building to send a political message to the government, inspired by the May 1968 protests in France.

"Solidarity" and "awareness" became watchwords, initially in literary and student circles, then in the socialist/syndicalist underground, and eventually permeating the media and government. By the early 1970s, under Prime Minister Olof Palme, Sweden vocally opposed oppression and war in countries such as South Africa and Vietnam. In December 1972, Palme condemned the U.S. bombings of Hanoi, comparing them to Nazi war crimes like the destructions of Lidice and Oradour, leading the U.S. to recall its ambassador.

Sweden's support for the African National Congress (ANC) and the Vietnamese National Front for the Liberation of South Vietnam (FNL) extended beyond rhetoric, encompassing economic aid and diplomatic backing. After Vietnam's reunification in 1975, Sweden assisted in constructing a modern pulp plant at Bai Bang. The Swedish International Development Cooperation Agency (Sida) provided substantial assistance over 25 years, with the total Swedish contribution amounting to SEK 2.8 billion. Despite initial challenges and criticisms, the project ultimately succeeded, with the mill reaching its projected capacity in 1996 and becoming a cornerstone of Vietnam's paper industry.

=== IB Affair ===
In 1973, Swedish journalists Jan Guillou and Peter Bratt uncovered the existence of Informationsbyrån (IB), a clandestine intelligence agency operating without official status within the Swedish Armed Forces. Their investigation revealed that IB conducted surveillance on individuals deemed threats to national security, including communists and left-wing activists. The exposé, published in the magazine Folket i Bild/Kulturfront, detailed IB's activities, including infiltration of leftist organizations and unauthorized surveillance. The revelations led to a significant political scandal in Sweden, known as the IB affair.

Guillou and Bratt, along with their source Håkan Isacson, were arrested and convicted of espionage. Their exposure of IB's operations highlighted issues of government transparency and the balance between national security and civil liberties in Sweden.

== Right-wing intermission ==
In the 1976 general election, a coalition of the Centre Party, the People's Party, and the Moderate Party secured a majority in the Riksdag, ending 44 years of uninterrupted Social Democratic rule. Thorbjörn Fälldin, leader of the Centre Party, became prime minister, marking the first non-Social Democratic leadership since 1932. Fälldin's tenure was marked by internal disagreements within the coalition, particularly over nuclear energy policy. These disputes led to the government's resignation in 1978. Fälldin returned as prime minister in 1979 after forming a new coalition. The coalition faced challenges addressing economic recession and energy debates, leading to perceptions of ineffective governance. In the 1982 election, the Social Democrats, led by Olof Palme, regained power.

=== Soviet Submarine Incursions and National Security ===
During the early 1980s, Sweden experienced several incidents involving foreign submarines violating its territorial waters, believed to be Soviet. The most notable was in October 1981, when the Soviet submarine U-137 ran aground near the Karlskrona naval base. Swedish authorities discovered uranium-238 on board, indicating the presence of nuclear weapons.

== Assassination of Olof Palme ==
On February 28, 1986, Prime Minister Palme was murdered as he was walking the streets of Stockholm with his wife. The crime came as a shock—indeed it is sometimes referred to as a national trauma, or an event by which Sweden "lost her innocence". The main suspect Christer Pettersson was convicted of the murder, but the conviction was reversed on appeal because the gun was never found. Pettersson died in 2004.

Palme was succeeded by his deputy Ingvar Carlsson.

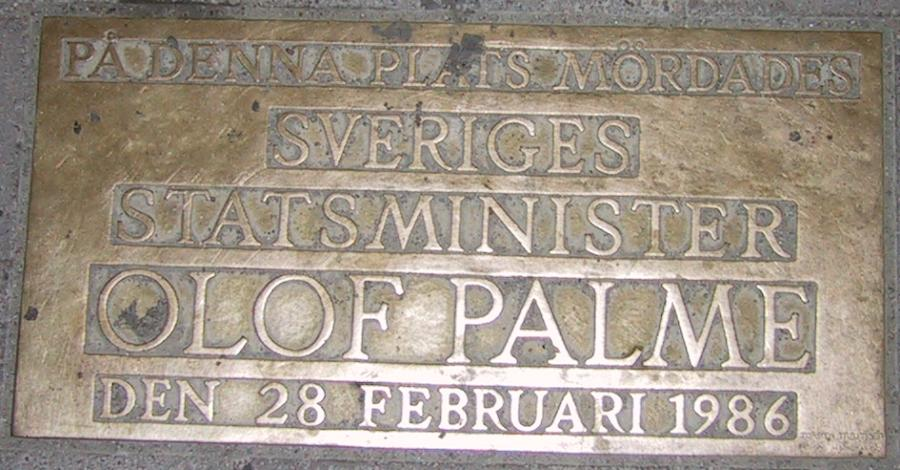
Memorial plaque of the Olof Palme assassination.
