= Börje =

Börje is an old Swedish male name. It is a cognate of Birger; Börje is the form that has developed naturally according to the sound change laws of Swedish, whilst Birger is a literary form that has been common since the nineteenth century, when archaic forms of names became fashionable.

== Etymology ==
The etymology of Börje is uncertain. Probably it is a short form of names beginning with Berg-. Less likely it means "helper", from the verb bärga. It has also been suggested that it is derived from the name element -ger (spear).

== Sound changes ==
Börje developed from Old Swedish Birghir which was pronounced with a voiced velar fricative [ɣ]: [birɣir]. The voiced velar fricative was spelled ⟨gh⟩ i Old Swedish and changed to /j/ after /r/ in modern Svenska.

Börje is an ija-stem. Ija-stems ended in -ir i Old Swedish, which regularly developed into a word final -e in modern Swedish. This explains why Börje has accent 2 today: since the synkope at the transition from Proto-Norse to Norse the name has been disyllabic, which leads to a word being pronounced with the grave accent in modern Swedish. Hence, the vowel in the second syllable of old Swedish Birghir or Birgher was no svarabhakti vowel like the -e- in modern Swedish words such as the a-stem dager, which at one stage was monosyllabic (dagr) and therefore has accent 1.

The first vowel -i- of Birghir between a b and an r changed into an -y- and then into an -ö-. The vowel was -i- labialised by the influence of the initial /b/.

== The form Birger ==
The form Birger has been revived from the old language within the last 200 years. This "revived" form has accent 1, like an a-stem with a nominative suffix consisting of the svarabhakti-vowel -e- plus -r. Swedish names revived during romanticism commonly take a historically unjustified pronunciation.

== Popularity ==
Börje was very common as a given name in 1930–49. Today it is almost never given as a first name that is used to address the person. In 2017 approximately 7 500 persons had the name as their first name or name of address.

Name day in Sweden: 9 June.

== People with the given name Börje ==
- Börje Ahlstedt (born 1939), Swedish actor
- Börje Carlsson (1933–2017), Swedish sailor
- Börje Dorch (1929–2004), Swedish writer
- Börje Ekedahl (1928–2006), Swedish bobsledder
- Börje Ekholm (born 1963), Swedish business executive, CEO of Ericsson
- Borje Fornstedt (1926–2015), Swedish tennis player
- Börje Fredriksson (1937–1968), Swedish jazz tenor saxophonist
- Börje Grönroos (1929–2015), Finnish boxer
- Börje Haraldsson (born 1957), Swedish physician and researcher
- Börje Hedblom (1940–1976), Swedish bobsledder
- Börje-Bengt Hedblom, Swedish bobsledder
- Börje Holmberg (1924–2021), Swedish educator and writer
- Börje Holmgren (1909–1990), Swedish male curler
- Börje Hörnlund (born 1935), Swedish politician
- Börje Jansson (born 1952), Swedish motorcycle road racer
- Börje Jansson (chess player) (born 1945), Swedish chess player
- Börje Jeppson (1915–1979), Swedish equestrian
- Börje Jeppsson (1929–2013), Swedish weightlifter
- Börje Karvonen (1938–2016), Finnish boxer
- Börje Klingberg (born 1952), Swedish former speedway rider
- Börje Lampenius (1921–2016), Finnish actor and theatrical director
- Börje Langefors (1915–2009), Swedish computer scientist
- Börje Larsson (disambiguation), multiple people
- Börje Leander (1918–2003), Swedish footballer
- Börje Mellvig (1911–1998), Swedish actor, screenwriter and director
- Börje Nilsson (disambiguation), multiple people
- Börje Nyberg (1920–2005), Swedish screenwriter, actor and film director
- Börje Persson, Swedish footballer
- Börje Rendin (1921–2016), Swedish Olympic athlete
- Börje Salming (1951–2022), Swedish ice hockey player
- Börje Stattin (1930–2020), Swedish gymnast
- Börje Strand (1935–1977), Finnish sprinter
- Börje Strandvall (1909–1987), Finnish sprinter
- Börje Svensson, Swedish trade union leader
- Börje Tapper (1922–1981), Swedish footballer
- Börje Vestlund (1960–2017), Swedish social democratic politician
- Börje Wallberg (1923–2014), Swedish military officer and philatelist
- Börje Wickberg (1926–2013), Swedish chemist

=== Middle Name ===
- Lars-Börje Eriksson (born 1966), Swedish Alpine skier
- Quorthon (Thomas Börje Forsberg) (1966–2004), Swedish songwriter and musician
