= Birgersson =

Birgersson is a Swedish surname. Notable people with the surname include:

- Knut Birgersson, Riksjarl of Sweden (died 1208)
- Magnus Birgersson (c. 1240 –1290)
- Oscar Birgersson (born 2000), Swedish ice hockey player

== See also ==
- Birger
- Birgir
- Birgerson
- Birgisson
