= Birgerson =

Birgerson is a Norwegian surname. Notable people with this name include:

- Malin Birgerson (born 1968), Swedish actress
- Magnus Birgerson (1300–1320), son and heir of Birger, King of Sweden
- Jon Birgerson (12th-century), Archbishop of Nidaros, in the Roman Catholic Archdiocese of Nidaros, Norway
- Hans Birgerson Wergeland (1861–1931), Norwegian politician
- Eric Birgerson (14th-century), son of Birger, King of Sweden
- Bengt Birgersson (1254–1291), Bishop and Duke of Finland

== See also ==
- Birger (given name)
- Birgir (given name)
- Birgersson (surname; Swedish surname)
- Birgisson (surname; Icelandic surname)
