= Betty BBQ =

German drag queen and entertainer

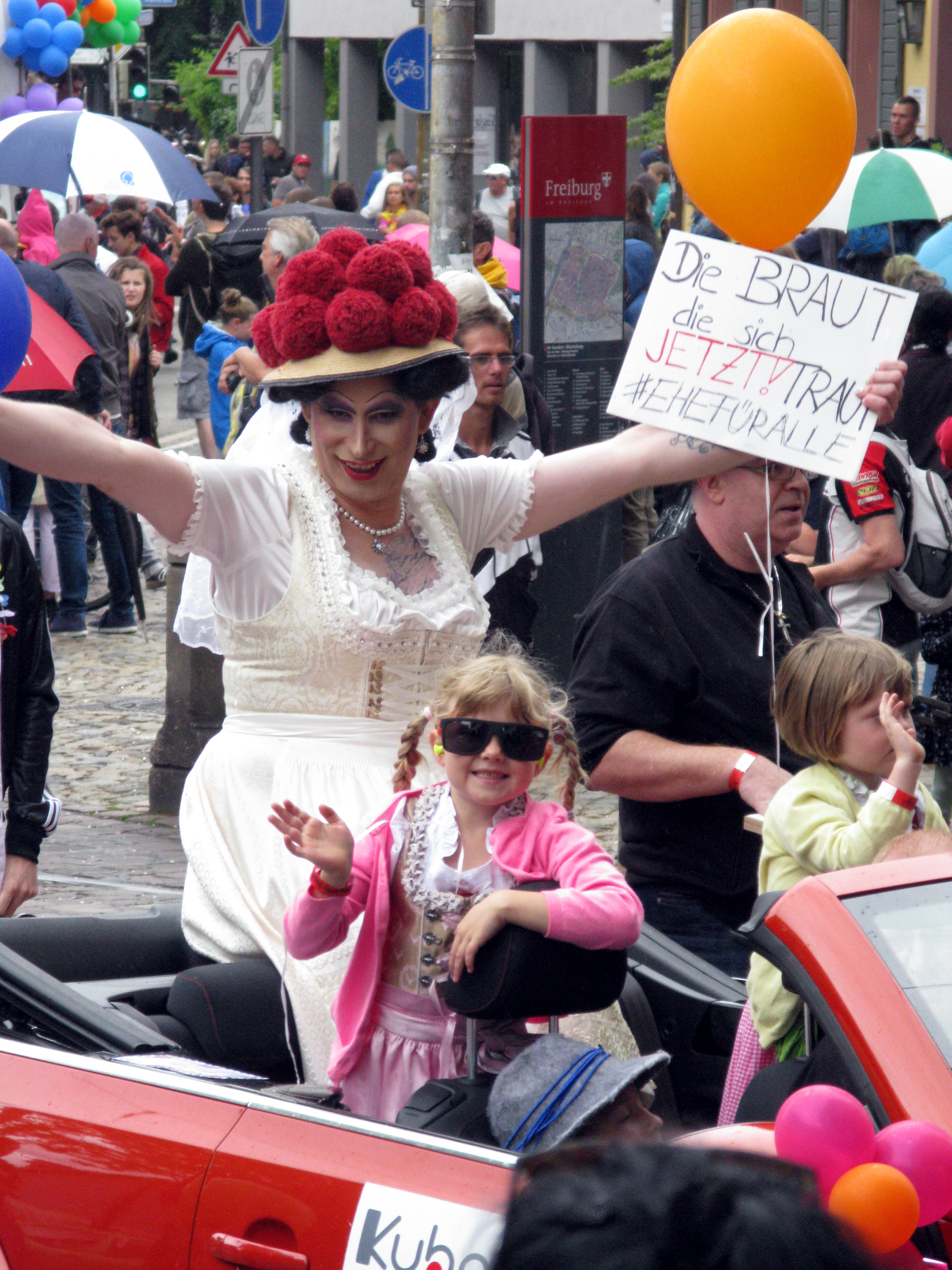
Betty BBQ at the pride parade in Freiburg in 2017

Lady Betty BBQ is the persona used by a German drag queen and entertainer based in Freiburg im Breisgau, a city in the Black Forest region in the state of Baden-Württemberg. To date, the cross-dressing artist has not released any of her personal details, preferring not to draw focus away from the character onto the performer. To this end, Betty BBQ has described the individual behind the persona as "living and loving as a homosexual, biological man." The drag queen's persona appears in numerous roles, including an entertainer, a moderator, a singer of popular show tunes, an activist for numerous issues, an author, and a tour guide for the city of Freiburg. In 2019, Betty was named as one of the nine official city ambassadors for the celebration of Freiburg's 900-year centennial celebration, standing as the ambassador of diversity.

Betty has described her performances thus: "Betty BBQ is a drag-queen, a living reminder that we shouldn't take any one thing as 'normal' and to accept each other for who we are." Her signature is the flamboyant red Bollenhut, a large brimmed hat adorned with fourteen red balls, a traditional piece of headwear in the Black Forest region of Germany which was worn by unmarried women, a significance the performer insists upon to emphasize her persona's connection to the history and culture of the Black Forest.

To the many tourists whom she offers guided tours through the city of Freiburg, Betty BBQ affectionately represents the quirks and cliches associated with the Black Forest. So as to not defame the traditional garments of the Black Forest, Betty often combines her outfits with various costume elements to add to the performative flare of her character, always color-coordinating them with other elements of her outfit, such as the traditional Dirndl. To date, Betty continues to be involved in activism for various causes, and particularly strongly in those centered around LGBTQ+ issues.

== Political and Social Ambitions ==
=== Queer-political dedication/involvement ===
The remix of Das lila Lied was created by Freiburger musician Redneck Jack in collaboration with Betty BBQ and Sebastian Heusel. It is the only remix of the song until today. Betty BBQ commented on her homepage that it was important to Redneck Jack and her not to disfigure Das lila Lied for the sake of a remix but to give the song a dignified remix- and party-gown which does not let the message and fight of homosexual people turn into a discobeat shell. The goal was to maintain the melody, singing, and message of the song and to invite listeners to sing along and to join the music movement, that is to make Das lila Lied more of an experience.

=== Local and social activism ===
Betty BBQ is a local activist emphasizing her fundamental message: Heimat is not only black-and-white. When it comes to local activism, she distances herself from her self-imposed rule to keep her private life separate from her life as a drag queen and fictional character pointing to experiences of discrimination during her adolescence in a village in the Black Forest. She stated that she constantly used to experience discrimination at school, clubs, and in village life in general as a young man because she was "different" and homosexual. Betty BBQ stresses that her occupation as a Black Forest Drag Queen made the Heimat she was denied as a child accessible to her again and that she has now obtained a permanent and acknowledged place in local society.

Participation and support of the regional Swabian-Alemannic Carnival is particularly close to Betty BBQ's heart because, according to her own statements, the artist's Drag Queen persona originated at the Freiburg/Rhineland Carnival.

Equally relevant to Betty BBQ is the gifting of a song that was written and composed at the end of September 2021 with party singer Schromme Schlachtschiff for Freiburg Sport-Club fans. The song, "Unser Stadion," which means "Our Stadium," was created in anticipation of the new soccer stadium and the deeply felt attachment to SC Freiburg. The music video for this song was released in mid-October 2021.

Additionally, Betty BBQ has also been a foundation ambassador for the Matthias Ginter Foundation since 2021. Founded by professional soccer player and German national soccer team player Matthias Ginter, the foundation provides support for mentally, physically, and socially disadvantaged children and young people up to the age of 18 in the Freiburg region.

Betty BBQ has taken part in multiple campaigns to promote and preserve the local Alemannic dialect.

=== Homophobic assaults on Betty BBQ ===
On New Year's Eve 2016, Betty BBQ fell victim to a homophobic attack near the Bertoldsbrunnen, a fountain, in Freiburg. On the same night, two other gay men were also attacked. On January 8, there was a demonstration in the city center of Freiburg, in which 800 people took part.

On August 6, 2020, there was another openly homophobic assault on Betty BBQ, which received a considerable amount of public attention. Betty BBQ had been on her way to a filming session and to one of her guided tours when a young man started to continually shout at her, insult her and threaten her physically as well as verbally. The fact that this happened in front of a big audience in broad daylight sparked a discussion about the brutalization of society in Freiburg.

== Trivia ==
After several gigs as Betty BBQ at numerous events, she made her first appearance as a traditional "Black Forest girl" at the Ganter Oktoberfest

Since 2015, she has hosted city tours of Freiburg, which have seen about 5.000 guests p.a. being introduced to her home town. She was honored by the two major online travel agencies, GetYourGuide and Tripadvisor, the latter one listing Betty BBQ's tours as part of the top 10% of recreational activities globally.

In the course of the Covid crisis, she introduced Bettys Vlog, a web series promoting artist's and other creative people's ideas and talking to persons affected by the pandemic. In November 2020, she partook in the campaign Kulturgesichter 0761, which was composed of local artists and promoters who wanted to point to the difficulties cultural workers had to face due to the pandemic and its economical consequences. After the traditional Freiburg Christmas market had been called off for the year, Betty BBQ promptly organized a "window Christmas market", selling mulled wine for takeout and proving highly popular with the people of Freiburg.

== Websites ==
- personal website
