= Göran Magnusson =

Göran Magnusson may refer to:

- Göran Magnusson (chemist) (1942–2000), Swedish chemist
- Göran Magnusson (politician) (1939–2010), Swedish politician
