= Finnbogason =

Finnbogason is an Icelandic patronymic, meaning son of Finnbogi (= "Finn bow", "Finnish bow"). In Icelandic names the name is not a family name, but a patronymic. Notable people with the name include:

- Alfreð Finnbogason (born 1989), Icelandic football striker
- Birgir Finnbogason (born 1948), Icelandic handball player
- Guðmundur Finnbogason (1873–1944), Icelandic philosopher; one of the first Icelandic psychologists
- Kjartan Finnbogason (born 1986), Icelandic football striker
- Kristján Finnbogason (born 1971), Icelandic football goalkeeper
- Kristján Flóki Finnbogason (born 1995), Icelandic football forward
