= Isacsson =

Isacsson or Isacson is a surname. Notable people with the surname include:

- Arne Isacsson (1917–2010), Swedish artist
- Håkan Isacson (1943–2002), Swedish spy
- Lars Isacsson (born 1970), Swedish politician
- Leo Isacson (1910–1996), American politician
- Linda Isacsson (born 1972), Swedish beauty pageant winner and television personality
- Magnus Isacsson (1948–2012), Canadian film director
