= Birger Nordholm =

- Birger Nordholm and Arthur Haulot under the motto "Understanding through travel is the passport to peace" ("Travel key to Europe" in This Week magazine, 1952).
- Born: Birger Joseph Nordholm; 25 June 1897; Hedvig Eleonora Parish, Stockholm, Sweden
- Died: November 30, 1989 (aged 92); Raleigh, North Carolina, U.S.
- Citizenship: Swedish, later American
- Education: Östra Real
- Occupations: Executive director, diplomat
- Employers: Swedish American Chamber of Commerce; Ministry of Communications; Embassy of Sweden, Washington, D.C.

Birger Joseph Nordholm (25 June 1897 – 30 November 1989) was a Swedish-American executive director and diplomat.

Nordholm was active in public diplomacy and international relations as Counselor for Tourism at the Embassy of Sweden, Washington, D.C., and chairman of the European Travel Commission.

== Biography ==
Birger Nordholm was born in 1897 and raised in Östermalm in Stockholm, Sweden. After graduating from Östra Real in 1913 and completing his military service, he worked in commerce and tourism, initially in Sweden and progressively from 1916 in the United States.

In 1921, the Swedish Ministry of Communications authorized the establishment of Sweden's first foreign tourist bureau headed by Birger Nordholm, later housed in the International Building, Rockefeller Center, New York City.

In 1918, Nordholm was appointed vice managing director of the Swedish American Chamber of Commerce in New York. In 1921, he was tasked with establishing Sweden's first overseas tourism bureau in New York on behalf of the Chamber and the Swedish Traffic Association (Svenska Trafikförbundet), officially authorized by the Swedish Ministry of Communications. This operation served as a foundational precursor to what later became Visit Sweden. The bureau was subsequently housed in the International Building at Rockefeller Center.

In this capacity, Nordholm represented Sweden at international expositions and other official events. From the outbreak of World War II, he directed information campaigns aimed at advancing the interests of neutral Sweden in the United States, efforts that eventually expanded to include other Scandinavian nations. He was also credited with assisting the establishment of Finland's first official travel office in the United States, alongside relief efforts organized through the Finnish Relief Fund during the war years.

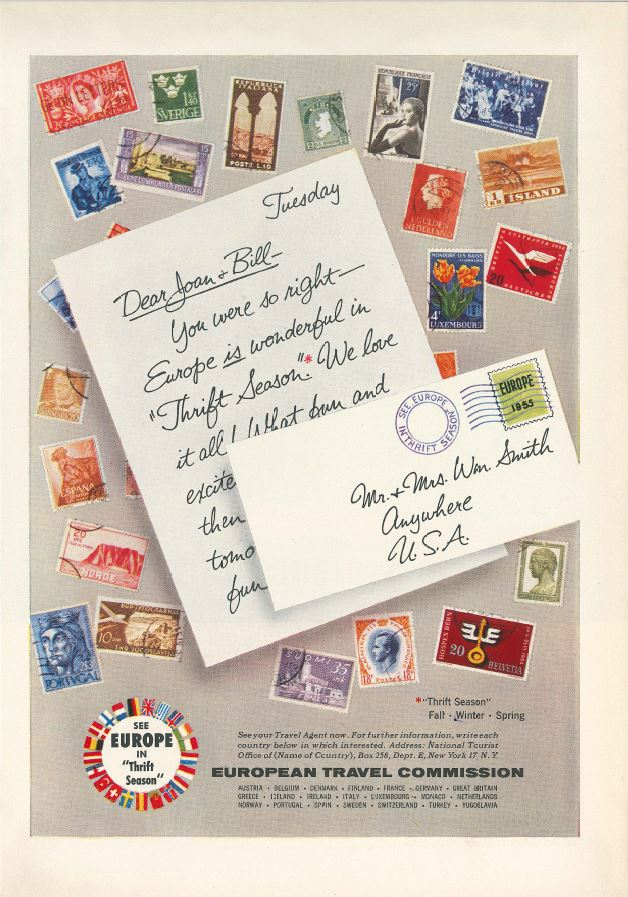
"See Europe in the Thrift Season" (1955). An advertisement by the European Travel Commission, founded in 1949 within the framework of the Marshall Plan as part of efforts toward European integration.

Following World War II, Nordholm was appointed founding chairman of the European Travel Commission in New York, serving from 1949 to 1963. The initiative operated within the framework of the Marshall Plan to foster European integration and transatlantic travel, receiving public recognition in the White House from President Dwight D. Eisenhower.

Nordholm subsequently served for many years as the accredited Counselor for Tourism at the Embassy of Sweden, Washington, D.C. Operating under the motto "Peace and understanding through travel", he promoted transatlantic exchange and international relations. Ahead of his 80th birthday in 1977, he was described in Svenska Dagbladet as an "elder statesman" and "one of the great promoters of Sweden."

Nordholm supported numerous Swedish-American cultural organizations, including the Swedish–American Historical Society and the American Swedish Historical Museum in Philadelphia. He was also a co-founder of Skål International New York in 1938. As an alumnus of Östra Real, he endowed the Birger Nordholm Foundation (Birger Nordholms stiftelse), which has awarded scholarships to students for significant achievements since 1990.

Beginning in 1924, he constructed "Tuckaway", a country house in Weston, Connecticut, north of New York City, recurringly hosting Swedish Midsummer celebrations for Swedish-Americans. According to the newspaper Nordstjernan, these festivities "fell in no way short of those celebrated in Sweden in authenticity: essentially, only the fireflies opposed everything Swedish."

Birger Nordholm was the son of Gustav Nordholm, a merchant, and Ellen Nordholm (née Persson). Throughout his working life, residing on Manhattan he retained his Swedish citizenship. Following his retirement, he moved permanently to Tuckaway in Connecticut, where he eventually became a naturalized United States citizen. He died in Raleigh, North Carolina, on 30 November 1989, at the age of 92.

== Distinctions ==
- /0/serviceThe property service is required
- /0/geometriesThe property geometries is required
- /0/typeDoes not have a value in the enumeration ["GeometryCollection"]
- /0/typeDoes not have a value in the enumeration ["MultiPolygon"]
- /0/typeDoes not have a value in the enumeration ["Point"]
- /0/typeDoes not have a value in the enumeration ["MultiPoint"]
- /0/typeDoes not have a value in the enumeration ["LineString"]
- /0/typeDoes not have a value in the enumeration ["MultiLineString"]
- /0/typeDoes not have a value in the enumeration ["Polygon"]
- /0/coordinatesThe property coordinates is required
- /0Failed to match exactly one schema
- /0/geometryThe property geometry is required
- /0/typeDoes not have a value in the enumeration ["Feature"]
- /0/featuresThe property features is required
- /0/typeDoes not have a value in the enumeration ["FeatureCollection"]
- (Sweden) Knight of the Order of the Polar Star (1952)
- (Sweden) Knight 1st Class of the Order of Vasa (1939)
- Knight of the Order of the White Rose of Finland
- (Denmark) Knight of the Order of the Dannebrog (1955)
- (Norway) St. Olav's Medal
- (France) Knight of the Order of Tourism Merit (1959)
- Key to the City of Burbank, California (1963)
- Key to the City of New York City (1987)
- Nordholm Drive in Weston, Connecticut, U.S. (1950s)

== Sources ==
- Vem är det: Svensk biografisk handbok 1933 (in Swedish). 1933. p. 628.
- Utredning angående Sveriges officiella resebyråer (PDF) (Report) (in Swedish). Kommunikationsdepartementet. 1927.
- Lindström, P-O (2003). "Birger Nordholms stiftelse" (PDF). Vi Östra Realare (in Swedish) (28).
