= Kajanus =

Kajanus is a surname. Notable people with the surname include:

- Birger Kajanus (1882–1931), Swedish biologist
- Georg Kajanus (born 1946), Norwegian composer and pop musician
- Robert Kajanus (1856–1933), Finnish conductor, composer, and teacher
