= European Travel Commission =

Association of National Tourism Organisations based in Brussels

The European Travel Commission (ETC) is an international non-profit association representing the national tourism organizations (NTOs) in Europe and is based in Brussels. It was established in 1948 to promote Europe as a tourist destination to long-haul markets outside of Europe; initially the United States, then Canada, Latin America, and Asia-Pacific later on. The ETC in 2023 had 36 member NTOs and 12 associate members from the private industry. The association aims to raise awareness of the importance of tourism among national European authorities and the general public through sharing best practices and cooperation in market intelligence and promotion.

== Members ==
ETC membership comprises 35 National Tourism Organizations (NTOs) from 34 European countries, eight of which are from outside the European Union|EU. The ETC member countries are: Austria, Belgium, Bulgaria, Croatia, Cyprus, Czech Republic, Denmark, Estonia, Finland, France, Germany, Greece, Hungary, Iceland, Ireland, Italy, Latvia, Lithuania, Luxembourg, Malta, Monaco, Montenegro, Netherlands, Norway, Poland, Portugal, Romania, San Marino, Serbia, Slovakia, Slovenia, Spain, Switzerland, and Ukraine.

In 2015, the ETC launched an associate membership program extending membership to private organizations and academia; the goal of seeking cooperation and support in strengthening the sustainable development of Europe as a tourist destination. As of 2026, ETC has 27 associate members: Airbnb, Alturos, Amadeus IT Group SA, Aviareps, The Bicester Collection, Booking.com, Emirates/Emirates Group, Expedia Inc, Feratel Media Technologies, GetYourGuide, Global Blue S.A., Hilton, HiSEAS, Hopscotch Tourism, Interrail B.V, Mastercard, Miles Partnership, MMGY Global, Queer Destinations, Rail Europe, Resonance, Rome2Rio, Skyscanner, Sojern Ltd., Tiki, TLScontact, and Trip.com.

== History ==
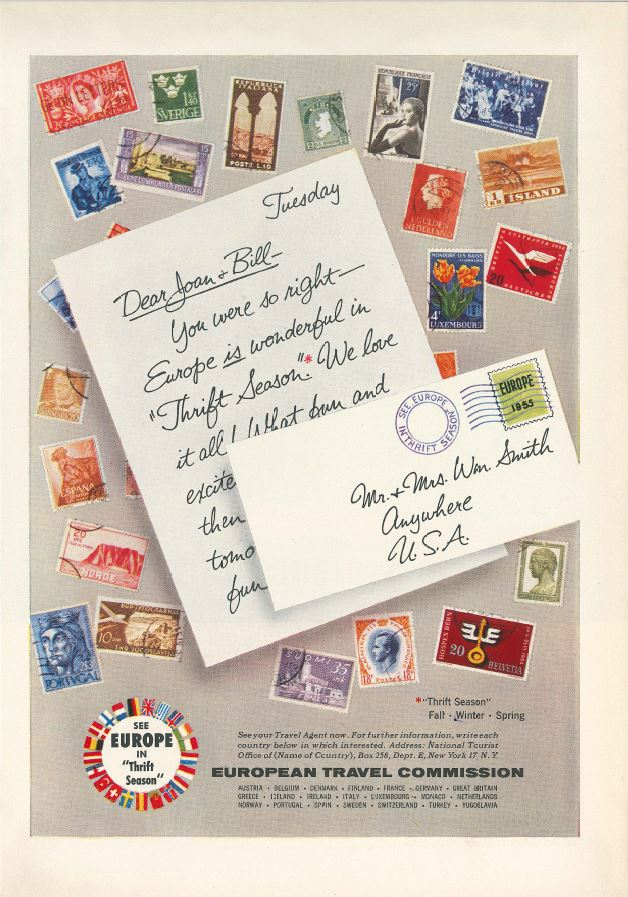
"See Europe in the Thrift Season" – ETC advertisement, 1955

=== 1948–1952: early years of ETC ===
ETC was established in Stalheim, Norway, during an excursion of the 1948 Congress of the International Union of Official Travel Organizations (IUOTO). ETC became IUOTO's regional commission for Europe in line with the latter's aim “to promote, in a technical and entirely non-political manner, freedom of travel, so as to strengthen peace and mutual understanding between the nations of the world.”

Committed to the freedom of travel and private enterprise, the ETC did not escape the reality of the early Cold War and cultivated strong ties with the Western camp. The 17 original member countries were recipients of aid from the Marshall Plan, and in July 1948, the ETC formalized its relationship with the Organization for European Economic Co-operation (OEEC) to supply the OEEC with expert knowledge on tourism matters. Recognizing the importance of tourism for the economic reconstruction of Europe, the OEEC Executive Committee established a Tourism Committee in February 1949.

=== 1950s–1960s: joint publicity campaigns in the United States, facilitating travel ===
Under OEEC oversight, joint publicity campaigns in the US turned into the flagship activity of the ETC. The first campaign took place from August to December 1949. The campaigns promoted Europe as one destination in the American market and encouraged off-season travel. The campaigns were realised by the ETC's New York Committee, which worked closely with marketing firms (e.g. Donald N. Martin & Company, Inc.) and private partners in the transportation, travel, and energy industries. Additionally, the ETC participated in travel fairs, published brochures and calendars of events, produced radio broadcasts, television advertising and short films, along with published advertisements in newspapers and magazines.

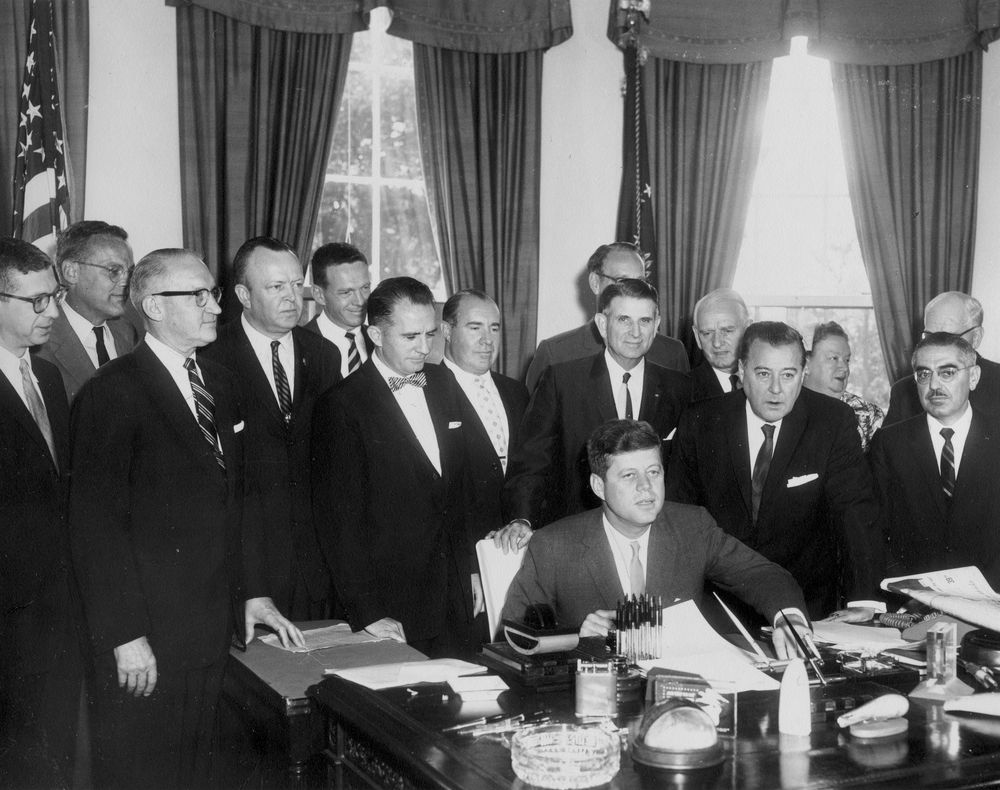
President Kennedy signs the act establishing the United States Travel Service, 29 Jun 1961 in the presence of Manolita Doelger, chairwoman of ETC New York (third from the right).

In May 1954, an ETC delegation met with President Dwight D. Eisenhower. The ETC praised Eisenhower for his strong support for international travel by Americans in the interest of rebuilding the European economies. However, concerns in the American administration over the deficit in the country's balance of payments prompted the Kennedy administration to create the United States Travel Service in June 1961 to motivate foreign nationals to visit the US. At around the same time the reorganization of the OEEC into the OECD ended its involvement in the publicity campaigns, which continued under the aegis of the ETC alone from 1964. ETC continued to defend the freedom to travel when President Lyndon B. Johnson's 1968 State of the Union address asked Americans to reduce non-essential travel. In response the ETC published a Declaration on the Freedom to Travel in February 1968 that identified the freedom to travel as a fundamental human right, to be enjoyed without restriction or discrimination.

The ETC also sought to facilitate travel and border crossings by abolishing visa requirements to travel to Europe and between European countries and by alleviating currency regulations, travel taxes, and customs formalities. By the mid-1950s, North American and Western European tourists could travel through Western Europe without major administrative formalities. Following the 1963 United Nations Conference on International Travel and Tourism, the ETC pushed for discussions on the recommendations of the conference to remove obstacles (visas, customs rules, border-crossing requirements) and streamline tourism regulations, implementing those regulations within the IUOTO and the OECD Tourism Committee.

=== ETC and Eastern Europe during the Cold War ===
In 1951, ETC welcomed Finland, Spain, and Yugoslavia to its membership. This decision was undoubtedly related to Cold War imperatives, and in the context of the rift caused by the 1948 Tito–Stalin split, Yugoslavia's membership of ETC was a steppingstone for the country's tourism policy, which aimed to attract more Western tourists. While Yugoslavia was the only socialist country to join the organisation, ETC initially viewed the application for membership from the Soviet Union and Poland after joining IUOTO in 1955 positively for their potential impact on the development of tourism before deciding their membership could be detrimental. Instead IUOTO created a Regional Commission for European Travel composed of national tourism boards from both Western and Eastern Europe while the joint publicity campaigns in the US continued under a separate organization that kept the already well-known name of the “European Travel Commission.

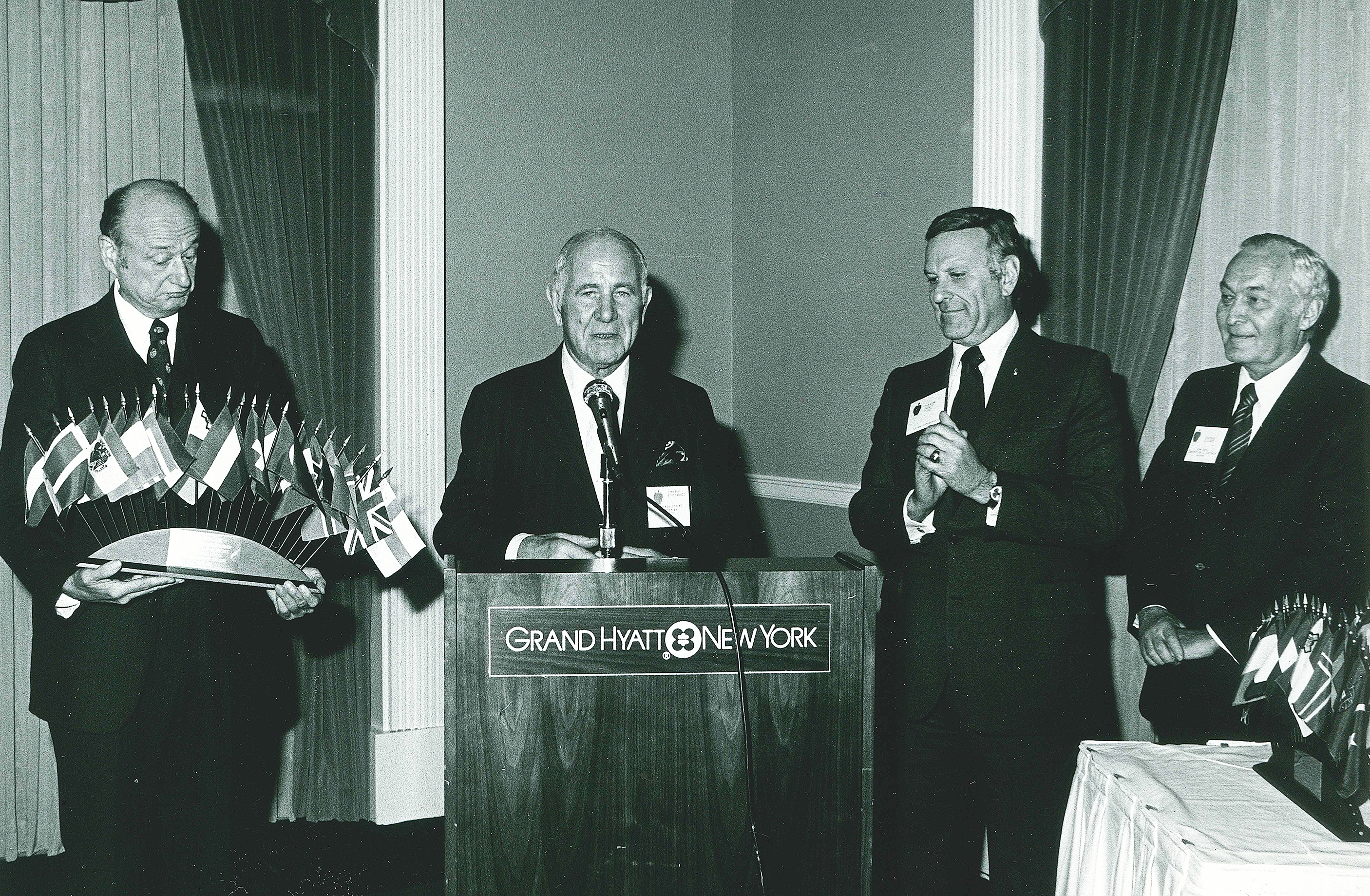
ETC President Timothy O' Driscoll presents flags to mayor of New York Edward Koch, 1979

=== 1970s–1980s: from Transatlantic to global player ===
In the early 1970s, the ETC obtained a presidency supported by vice presidents and permanent secretariat at the same time Malta (1971) and Cyprus (1973) became member countries. ETC added the preservation of cultural heritage to its mission in collaboration with Europa Nostra, a pan-European federation for cultural heritage. During the 1970s, the ETC capitalized on new technological opportunities from transportation to ICT technologies and facilitated the exchange of information and experiences among its members on these subjects. The creation of Operation Groups in Japan, Argentina, Canada, and Australia in the 1970s, and the ETC's increasing interest in Southeast Asian markets in the 1980s expanded ETC's geographic scope.

The 1970s also signaled the beginning of a long-standing collaboration with the European Economic Community (EEC). In the 1980s, the EEC engaged more directly with tourism and ETC with research initiatives and grant support. The European Parliament identified, for instance, "ETC as best placed for the coordination of overseas promotion of tourism to the EEC." In 1981, the ETC also co-founded the European Tourism Action Group, a group of associations advocating for the importance of Europe as a tourist destination.

=== 1990s–2000s: ETC in Europe after the Cold War ===
The Fall of the Berlin Wall in November 1989, the dissolution of the Soviet Union in 1991, and the transformation of the European Economic Community (EEC) into the European Union in 1993 with the Treaty of Maastricht entailed a significant expansion of ETC's membership starting with Hungary in 1990, and a consolidation of the relationship with European institutions. Throughout the 1990s, the ETC sought to give tourism broader recognition on the EU level. When the Treaty of Lisbon took effect in 2009, tourism was added as a policy domain in which the EU could intervene through article 195 of the Treaty on the Functioning of the European Union. Meanwhile, ETC continued its research agenda in collaborations with the United Nations World Tourism Organisation (UNWTO) and the European Tourism Association (ETOA). It increasingly paid attention to travel-related computer technologies and online marketing strategies. ETC launched its first website in January 1996, which was fully revamped in 2006 with the help of European Commission funds. The VisitEurope.com website is currently ETC's main platform for the promotion of Destination Europe.

=== 2000s–2020s ===
Between 2015 and May 2023, ETC held the Chairmanship and Secretariat of the European Tourism Manifesto, an alliance supported by over 50 public and private stakeholders from the tourism sector that highlights the key EU policy priorities for the sector on topics ranging from skills and qualifications to sustainability and competitiveness of Europe's tourism.

In 2017, ETC was designated as the official strategic partner of the European Commission for the implementation of the promotional activities in the framework of the 2018 EU-China Tourism Year.

In 2019, ETC launched a new marketing strategy, Horizon 2022, moving from a traditional geographic segmentation to a cross-market thematic promotional approach. Instead of presenting Europe as a sum of destinations, the new strategy promotes the continent as a sum of experiences and interests in multiple destinations around the continent.

=== Current activities ===
The promotion of Europe as a tourist destination continues to be the ETC's flagship activity. In 2019, ETC launched a new marketing strategy, Horizon 2022, moving from a traditional geographic segmentation to a cross-market thematic promotional approach. Instead of presenting Europe as a sum of destinations, the new strategy promotes the continent as a sum of experiences and interests in multiple destinations around the continent.

Market intelligence underpins ETC's marketing strategies and services. ETC's analysis of tourism market trends and relevant outbound markets aim to help the organization and its members to understand the business environment, detect growth opportunities and formulate suitable promotional strategies. In research ETC collaborates with the United Nations World Tourism Organisation (UNWTO), World Travel and Tourism Council (WTTC), European Tourism Association (ETOA), Eurail Group G.I.E, International Air Transport Association (IATA), TourMIS, Tourism Economics, STR, ForwardKeys, Amadeus, and others.

ETC continues to be an advocate for the freedom to travel and for the recognition of tourism as an essential sector of the economy. Sustainability, visa facilitation and connectivity currently constitute the triple focus of ETC's advocacy work.

ETC and the European Commission have established a long-term strategic partnership in promoting Destination Europe. In 2011, ETC and the European Commission agreed to work jointly to maintain Europe's position as the world's leading tourist destination by promoting the Destination Europe brand and supporting the sustainable competitive development of the sector. Since 2012, the European Commission has entrusted ETC with yearly ad hoc grants for the implementation of a program of promotional actions aimed at bringing new visitors from targeted third countries to Europe. In 2017, ETC was designated as the official strategic partner of the European Commission for the implementation of the promotional activities in the framework of the 2018 EU-China Tourism Year. Additionally, ETC collaborates with other EU institutions such as the European Parliament in its efforts to further advance tourism policies at EU level.

There are two other relevant activities that ETC is currently implementing: the Climate Action Plan and the Rail Tourism Awards.

==== Climate Action Plan ====
ETC has launched its Climate Action Plan with the aim of addressing the urgency of climate action, halving emissions generated by ETC's operations, as well as supporting engagement in climate action among its member National Tourism Organisations (NTOs), and leading the way for tourism stakeholders in Europe.

As a signatory of the Glasgow Declaration on Climate Action in Tourism since 2022, ETC is also committed to building a consistent carbon reduction strategy and amplifying climate action by actively supporting ETC member National Tourism Organisations (NTOs) to commit to Net Zero.

==== Rail Tourism Awards ====
Since 2021, ETC has been partnering up with Eurail to organise the yearly competition to award marketing campaigns which promote train travel as a sustainable tourism model across Europe.

== Organisational aims and structure ==
The European Travel Commission is registered in Belgium as a non-profit international association. Its financial resources come from membership contributions. During past years, ETC was awarded EU funding on an ad hoc basis for the promotion of Destination Europe. ETC currently focuses its activities in the following areas:

- Marketing: ETC promotes Europe as a tourist destination in key third visitor markets on behalf of its member organisations. It undertakes regional trade and global consumer marketing campaigns to promote Destination Europe in key overseas markets.
- Research: ETC analyses tourism market trends to identify fast-growing outbound markets. ETC research activities aim to deliver the intelligence support necessary to keep a competitive edge in the global tourism market, detecting new growth opportunities and formulating suitable promotional strategies.
- Advocacy: In close collaboration with the travel industry, ETC raises awareness among public authorities and the wider public across Europe of the economic and broader importance of tourism.

ETC activities are implemented by the Executive Unit based in Brussels under the guidance of the Board of Directors, and with the support of a number of expert groups: the Market Intelligence Group, the Marketing Group, and the Overseas Chapters.

=== General meeting and board of directors ===
ETC organizes a General Meeting twice a year to decide on the budget and the program of work. The Board of Directors is the ETC's steering committee and consists of the President, up to three Vice-Presidents, the permanent members and maximum 7 non-permanent members. The permanent members are Austria, Belgium, France, Germany, Italy, and Spain. Non-permanent members rotate every 2 years and come from one of each of the 7 geographic groups. In 2017, the CEO of Visit Flanders (Belgium), Peter De Wilde, was re-elected as the ETC President for his 2nd term and was followed by the Presidency of Luís Araújo from Turismo de Portugal. In May 2023, Miguel Sanz, Director General of Tours pain, has been elected as the President of ETC for a 3 year term.

=== Executive Unit ===
The Executive Unit administers the organization from its headquarters in Brussels under the leadership of the Executive Director. In 2012, Eduardo Santander was appointed as the Executive Director of ETC.

=== The Marketing Group and the Market Intelligence Group ===
The Marketing Group is the ETC's think tank for all issues related to the promotion of Europe as a destination and a platform for sharing information and best practices. The Market Intelligence Group consists of the research directors of the member NTOs and is responsible for the ETC's research program.

=== Overseas Chapters ===
ETC has set up Overseas Chapters in its key markets. The first Overseas Chapter (previously called Operations Group) was set up, and continues to exist, in New York. The US Chapter also served the Canadian market until a separate chapter was set up in 1978. Other Overseas Chapters are currently active in Brazil, China, Australia and Japan. Each chapter is responsible for a joint program of activities for the promotion of Destination Europe in their respective markets.

== See also ==
- Association of Special Fares Agents
- European Distance and E-learning Network
