= Göran Magnusson (chemist) =

Swedish chemist

- Born: 23 April 1942; Simrishamn, Sweden
- Died: 7 June 2000 (aged 58)
- Education: Lund University
- Known for: Organic chemistry; Carbohydrate Chemistry
- Scientific career
- Fields: Chemistry
- Workplaces: Lund University
- Doctoral advisor: Börje Wickberg

Hans Göran Magnusson (23 April 1942 – 7 June 2000) was a Swedish chemist.

Magnusson graduated with a Ph.D. in 1975 from Lund University with a thesis on sesquiterpene chemistry, and was simultaneously awarded the title as Docent. In 1978-79, he was a postdoctoral research associate at Rice University, USA, where he worked with natural products' chemist Ernest Wenkert on alkaloid synthesis. After his return to Sweden, he was first recruited to build a research unit in organic chemistry at the Swedish Sugar Corporation before returning to Lund University, where he was appointed Professor of organic chemistry in 1991 and where he stayed until his death.

== Sources ==
- Magnusson, G. (1991) KC-Kalendern (in Swedish), 22 (4).
