= Börje Haraldsson =

Swedish Physician-scientist

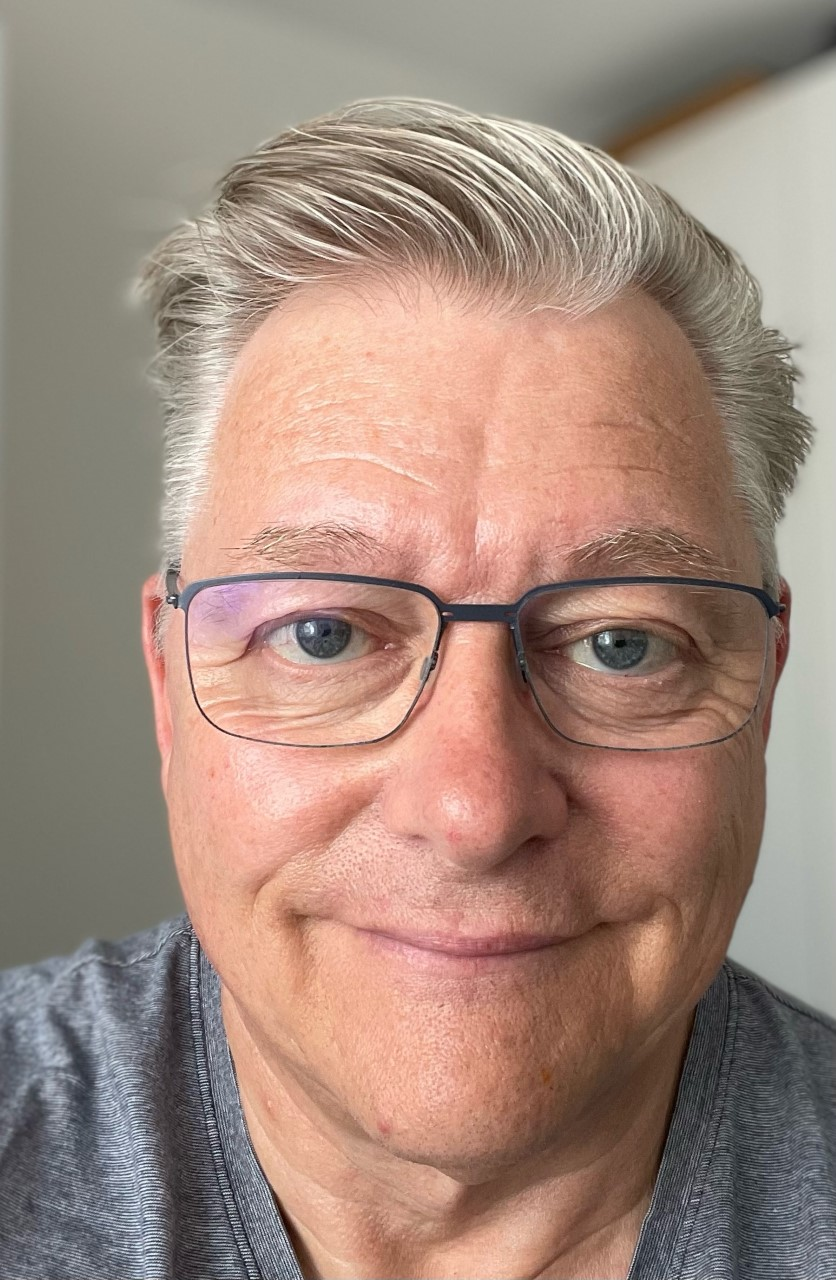
- Born: October 14, 1957 (age 68); Borås, Sweden
- Other names: Börje Haraldsson; Boerje Haraldsson; Borje Haraldsson
- Education: University of Gothenburg
- Occupations: Physician-scientist, and academic
- Known for: work on kidney disease
- Spouse: Karin Haraldsson
- Scientific career
- Workplaces: Oncorena AB; University of Gothenburg

Börje Haraldsson is a Swedish Physician-scientist known for his work on kidney disease. He is the Chief Executive Officer at Oncorena AB, and a Professor of Physiology in Sahlgrenska Academy at the University of Gothenburg. He is also a Fellow of the American Society of Transplantation (FAST), and the American Society of Nephrology (FASN).

== Early life and education ==
Haraldsson was born on October 14, 1957, in Borås, Sweden. After completing his early education in a high school at Bäckängsgymnasiet, he started medical school at the University of Gothenburg in 1976. There he performed his graduate work in physiology to receive his M.D. in 1982 and Ph.D in 1986, under the supervision of Bengt Rippe and Björn Folkow. His dissertation was titled "Physiological studies of macromolecular transport across capillary walls".

== Career ==
During his doctoral studies, Haraldsson began his clinical career as a part-time physician in emergency rooms in Borås, Vänersborg, Bäckefors, and Lysekil. He completed his internship at Mölndals hospital, Sweden in 1989, and was subsequently appointed by Sahlgrenska university hospital as Resident Physician. Afterward, he served there as an attending physician till 2000, and as senior consultant till 2014.

Haraldsson was appointed as an associate professor (docent) of Physiology at University of Gothenburg till 2000, and as a Professor and Chair of Nephrology till 2015. During this time period, he also held concurrent appointments as Researcher in integrative physiology, as Department Head, as Director of the university board, and as Vice Dean for the Sahlgrenska academy at the University of Gothenburg. Moreover, he chaired several Swedish Research Council’s expert panels, and served as scientific secretary of the Gothenburg Medical Association. From 2011 till 2014, he was a visiting professor of medicine at Mount Sinai School of medicine in New York.

In 2015, Haraldsson resigned his clinical professorship to join Novartis in Switzerland. As he returned to Sweden in 2022, he rejoined the University of Gothenburg as Professor of Physiology.

In 2014, Haraldsson held appointment as an Executive Director at Novartis Institute of Biomedical research (NIBR). After working there as a translational medicine expert in the ATI department for 3 years, he became Global Program Head in immunology, hepatology and dermatology (IHD) in 2018. In 2022, he left Novartis to become CSO, and four months later CEO, at Oncorena AB.

Haraldsson is the Founder of three consultancy firms: Hand i Hand, Soinial AB, and Creorena AB.

== Research ==
Haraldsson has focused his research on kidney disease, with particular attention on the properties of the glomerular barrier crucial for whole-body homeostasis and survival. His clinical expertise includes hypertension, hemodialysis, clinical nephrology, and chronic kidney failure. Currently, Haraldsson has been working on the development of a new drug that could cure widespread kidney cancer.

=== Novel techniques to assess permeability in different organs ===
Haraldsson introduced several models and techniques to explore the permeability in different organs. Together with Bengt Rippe, he developed the two-pore model for solute exchange, and later the three-pore model for fluid and solute exchange across capillary walls. They provided new insights regarding fenestrated capillaries of the pancreatic, and salivary glands which were considered to ‘leak’ proteins. They demonstrated that these capillaries had similar permselectivity as continuous capillaries.

Haraldsson is also the one to discover the role of orosomucoid in terms of maintenance of normal capillary permselectivity. He regarded the endothelial cell surface layer (ESL) to be the key contributor in the context of the glomerular barrier. In a study conducted in 1993, he discussed the application of plasma glycoprotein orosomucoid in regulating the dynamic properties of the glomerular capillary wall by reducing the permeability towards macromolecules. He developed a computer model for individualized therapy of patients with PD, and regarded total pore area over diffusion distance (A(0)/Deltax) to be the significant parameter to describe exchange across the peritoneal membrane.

=== Understanding of the glomerular barrier and its components ===
Haraldsson’s research group published a series of papers focused on the understanding of the glomerular barrier, its properties, and the role of its individual components. In a paper published in 1992, he highlighted the role of orosomucoid in terms of maintenance of normal capillary permeability in skeletal muscle and mesentery. The research group also demonstrated that serum proteins other than albumin and orosomucoid are less important for the maintenance of normal capillary permeability. In 2003, he and Jeansson conducted the first functional study of glomerular size and charge selectivity in mice to explore the controversial issue of glomerular permselectivity in animals exposed to glucosaminoglycan-degrading enzymes, hyaluronidase, and heparinase. It was found out that polysaccharide-rich structures, such as the endothelial cell coat are key components in the glomerular barrier.

Building on work by William Deen, Haraldsson developed the first unified heterogenous charged fiber model, while incorporating the effects of solute size and charge. He along with co-workers, also demonstrated how the structure of the ESL can be affected by enzymes, ischemia-reperfusion injury, or ionic strength, causing proteinuria. He studied the interaction between podocytes, the endothelial cells, and their ESL, and presented conditions with disturbed communication causing proteinuria. In 2014, together with colleagues in New York, he confirmed the reciprocal crosstalk between podocytes and endothelial cells in a coculture system, and further highlighted that segmental glomerulosclerosis develops as a result of podocyte-endothelial crosstalk mediated by EDN1/EDNRA-dependent mitochondrial dysfunction.

While focusing his studies on orellanine, Haraldsson’s group introduced HPLC-ESI-MS/MS method which has the ability to monitor orellanine at low concentrations within the therapeutic interval in blood serum. Later on, the research group provided long-term clinical outcomes for patients poisoned by the fungal nephrotoxin orellanine. Their studies also suggested the usage of orellanine in terms of eliminating human renal cancer carcinomas with its highly organ-specific cytotoxic properties.

== Awards and honors ==
- 1999 - High Pedagogical Award, University of Gothenburg
- 2009 - Recipient of "Guldtackan" for contributions to the Medical Students

== Selected publications ==
- Nashan, B., Tedesco, H., Van den Hoogen, M. W., Berger, S. P., Cibrik, D., Mulgaonkar, S., ... & Witzke, O. (2018). CD40 inhibition with CFZ533-a new, fully human, non-depleting, Fc silent mAB-improves renal allograft function while demonstrating comparable efficacy vs. tacrolimus in de-novo CNI-free kidney transplant recipients. Transplantation, 102, S366.
- Nystrom, J., Khramova, A., Haraldsson, B., & Ebefors, K. (2019). SAT-125 Proteoglycans are glomerular endothelial glycocalyx components playing a major role in permselectivity and prevention of proteinuria. Kidney International Reports, 4(7), S57.
- Webb, N., Haraldsson, B., Schubart, A., Milojevic, J., End, P., Holbro, T., & Junge, G. (2020). MO042 LNP023: A NOVEL ORAL COMPLEMENT ALTERNATIVE PATHWAY FACTOR B INHIBITOR FOR THE TREATMENT OF GLOMERULAR DISEASE. Nephrology Dialysis Transplantation, 35(Supplement_3), gfaa140-MO042.
- Ballermann, B. J., Nystrom, J., & Haraldsson, B. (2021). The glomerular endothelium restricts albumin filtration. Frontiers in Medicine, 2402.
- Khramova, A., Boi, R., Fridén, V., Granqvist, A. B., Nilsson, U., Tenstad, O., ... & Nyström, J. (2021). Proteoglycans contribute to the functional integrity of the glomerular endothelial cell surface layer and are regulated in diabetic kidney disease. Scientific reports, 11(1), 1-12.
