= Birger Sörvik =

Swedish artistic gymnast

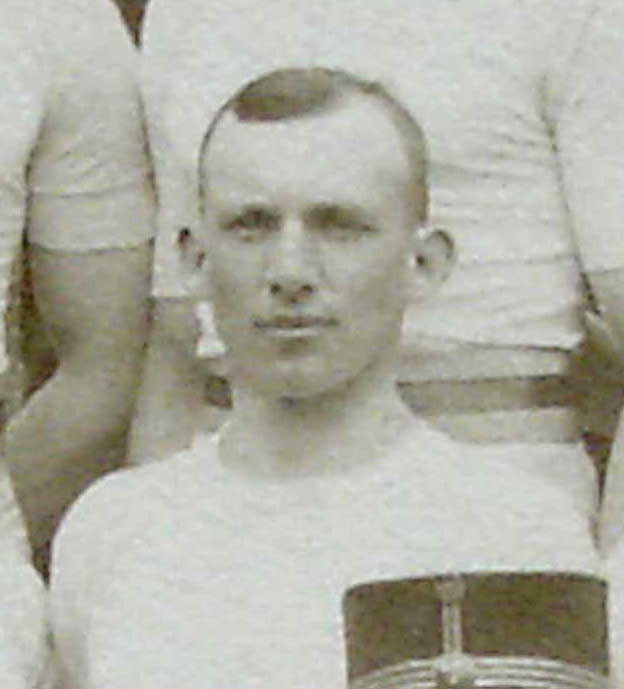
- Sörvik in 1908

Personal information
- Full name: Knut Birger Sörvik
- Born: 4 December 1879 Gothenburg, United Kingdoms of Sweden and Norway
- Died: 23 May 1978 (aged 98) Hovås, Sweden
- Relatives: Haakon Sörvik (brother); Leif Sörvik (brother)

Gymnastics career
- Discipline: Men's artistic gymnastics
- Country represented: Sweden
- Gym: Göteborgs Gymnastikförening
Medal record
Men's artistic gymnastics
Representing Sweden
Olympic Games
Gold medal – first place	1908 London	Team

Knut Birger Sörvik (4 December 1879 – 23 May 1978) was a Swedish gymnast who competed in the 1908 Summer Olympics. Together with his brother Haakon he was part of the Swedish team that won the all-around gold medal. His another brother Leif competed in rowing at the 1912 Games.
