= Birger Larsen =

Birger Larsen may refer to:

- Birger Larsen (footballer) (1942–2024), Danish football player
- Birger Larsen (director) (1961–2016), Danish film director and screenwriter
- Birger Larsen, bassist for the Norwegian blackened death metal band Grimfist
