= Birger Gerhardsson =

Birger Gerhardsson (26 September 1926 – 25 December 2013) was a Swedish New Testament scholar and professor in the Faculty of Theology at Lund University, Sweden. His primary academic focus was on the transmission and development of the oral traditions of the New Testament gospels.

== Selected works ==
=== Thesis ===
- Gerhardsson, Birger (1961). Memory and Manuscript: Oral Tradition and Written Transmission in Rabbinic Judaism and Early Christianity (Ph.D.). Copenhagen: Uppsala. OCLC 1061433.

=== Books ===
- ——— (1964). Memory and Manuscript: Oral Tradition and Written Transmission in Rabbinic Judaism and Early Christianity. Acta Seminarii Neotestamentici Upsaliensis. Vol. 22. Lund: C.W.K. Gleerup. OCLC 936421713.
- ——— (1964). Tradition and Transmission in Early Christianity. Coniectanea Neotestamentica. Vol. 20. Lund: C.W.K. Gleerup.
- ——— (1998). Memory and Manuscript: Oral Tradition and Written Transmission in Rabbinic Judaism and Early Christianity with Tradition and Transmission in Early Christianity. Biblical Resource Series. Grand Rapids, MI: Eerdmans. ISBN 9780802843661. OCLC 258554377.
- ——— (1977). The Origins of the Gospel Traditions. London: SCM Press. ISBN 9780334011934. OCLC 732883624.
- ——— (2001). The Reliability of the Gospel Tradition. Peabody, MA: Hendrickson Publishers. ISBN 9781565636675. OCLC 799278805.
