= Bãi Bằng =

Industrial area northwest of Hanoi

Coordinates: 21.4166°N 105.3161°E

Bãi Bằng is an industrial area northwest of Hanoi. It is home to the large paper mill of the same name, completed in 1996.

== Controversial development project ==
The construction of the Bãi Bằng paper mill was controversial. This project was signed as a cooperation between Sweden and then North Vietnam in 1969, with construction beginning in 1975. The construction was evaluated by the Chr. Michelsen Institute, an independent, non-profit research foundation based in Norway.

However, many problems caused the project to take until 1996 before reaching the projected capacity. The projected cost was 770 million Swedish kronor, but instead totaled to 2.8 billion Swedish kronor. For many years, the Bãi Bằng paper mill was seen as problematic. In the long run, Bãi Bằng became a success. It is the largest paper mill in Vietnam, and after reaching operational capacity in 1996, one of the most successful paper mills in the country.

== Production and importance ==
When the mill operates at maximum capacity it produces approximately 40 percent of all the paper in Vietnam, and is one of the largest manufacturers of toilet paper in the country. In 2008, the mill produced 110,000 tons of paper, twice as much as planned.

A project to expand the mill was started in 2005 with the goal of increasing the mill’s annual pulp capacity from 100,000 to 250,000 tons, making it one of the largest producers in the country and nearly satisfying total Vietnam's demand.

The wood fiber consumed by the mill consists of Styrax, a deciduous native hardwood, and bamboo from natural forests.

Around 2,000 people work at Bãi Bằng. This investment has contributed to a high standard of living around Bãi Bằng. The village has grown into a small town with about 20,000 inhabitants.

100 km northwest of Bãi Bằng is Ham Yen, which is the center of the forest part in the project.

Many Swedes who worked and lived in Bãi Bằng are coming back as tourists. The Swedish travel agency TravelBase arranges special tours to the paper mill.
