= Björn Folkow =

Swedish physiologist

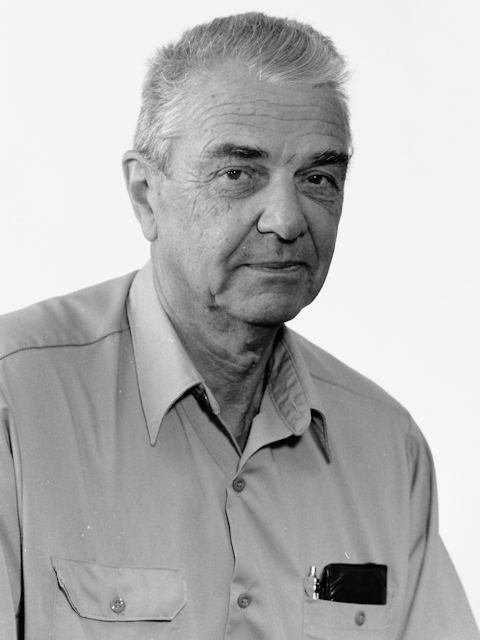
B Folkow 1991

Björn Folkow (/bjɜːrn ˈfɒlkɒv/ byurn FOL-kov; 13 October 1921 – 23 July 2012) was a Swedish physiologist. He was professor in physiology at the University of Gothenburg between 1961 and 1987 and a member of the Royal Swedish Academy of Sciences.

== Biography ==
Björn Folkow was born in Halmstad, Sweden. He studied medicine at Lund University where he continued with doctoral studies in physiology. He defended his thesis on 9 May 1949. Soon thereafter he became associate professor ("laborator") at the new Department of Physiology at the University of Gothenburg. He became full professor in 1961 and remained there until his retirement in 1987. Even after retirement he continued being active in the department until shortly before his death in 2012.

Folkow was a member of the Royal Swedish Academy of Sciences and member of the Danish and Russian Academies of Sciences. The European Society of Hypertension established the Björn Folkow Award and Lecture in 1989.

== Scientific activity ==
Folkow published more than 400 scientific papers, covering most areas of cardiovascular physiology. He was an international authority in the field of high blood pressure. His main contributions arguably are found in the following areas:

- The myogenic response of blood vessels – in 1902, Bayliss described that many blood vessels respond to an elevation of transmural pressure by constriction, finally reaching a diameter that is smaller than the initial diameter at the lower pressure. This observation, which had not received much attention at the time, was studied by Folkow as part of his thesis work and subsequently for more than a decade. He described this mechanism as an essential element in vascular control. This is now well-established knowledge in cardiovascular physiology.
- The structural adaptation of blood vessels to elevated blood pressure – Folkow and coworkers studied the blood flow in the forearm in persons with high blood pressure, finding an elevated resistance to flow even in situations when the blood vessels would be fully dilated. This indicated a structural adaptation of the blood vessels to a state with smaller lumen diameter but thicker wall (what now is termed remodelling). This confers to the vessel wall what corresponds to a longer lever, enabling them to contract against higher pressures. This can be seen as the beginning of a vicious circle, where an elevation of pressure causes remodelling that promotes further pressure elevation. Folkow's description of these vascular alterations has since been verified in a large number of studies.
- The role of the central nervous system in cardiovascular control – possibly as a consequence of Folkow's interest in the interplay between body and mind, he became interested in central nervous control of the cardiovascular system. He particularly pointed to the role of the defence-alarm reaction (the fight-or-flight response) in everyday blood-pressure control. His opinion was that individuals with a tendency to react more strongly with this response tend to develop higher blood pressure, since they more often get blood pressure elevation in response to common stressors. Even though the kidney is important for blood pressure control, he viewed it as subordinate to the brain.
- The function of the sympathetic nerve terminals – the sympathetic nervous system has a central role in blood pressure control. It thus attracted Folkow's attention early on, in particular following the mapping of this system. Combining quantification of the density of adrenergic varicosities in the vascular wall with estimates of noradrenaline release indicated that on average only a few per cent of the transmitter content of a synaptic vesicle was released from a given nerve terminal by an action potential in the nerve. It has since been found that transmitter release from a varicosity is intermittent, but whether all or only part of the vesicle's contents is released is still a matter of debate.
- The physiology of aging – partly because of his contacts with the professor of geriatrics in Gothenburg, Alvar Svanborg, Folkow acquired an interest for the implications of physiological aging in cardiovascular control. This collaboration resulted in a major review article in this field.

== Textbook ==
- Circulation – this textbook was written by Folkow in collaboration with Eric Neil. It is a thorough description of the essential concepts in this area, and large parts of it remain relevant even today, although for obvious reasons more modern aspects are lacking. A follow-up was planned in the eighties in collaboration with Paul Korner, but due to differences in opinion on several aspects Folkow withdrew from the collaboration to save their friendship.
