= Birger Elmér =

Swedish military and intelligence officer

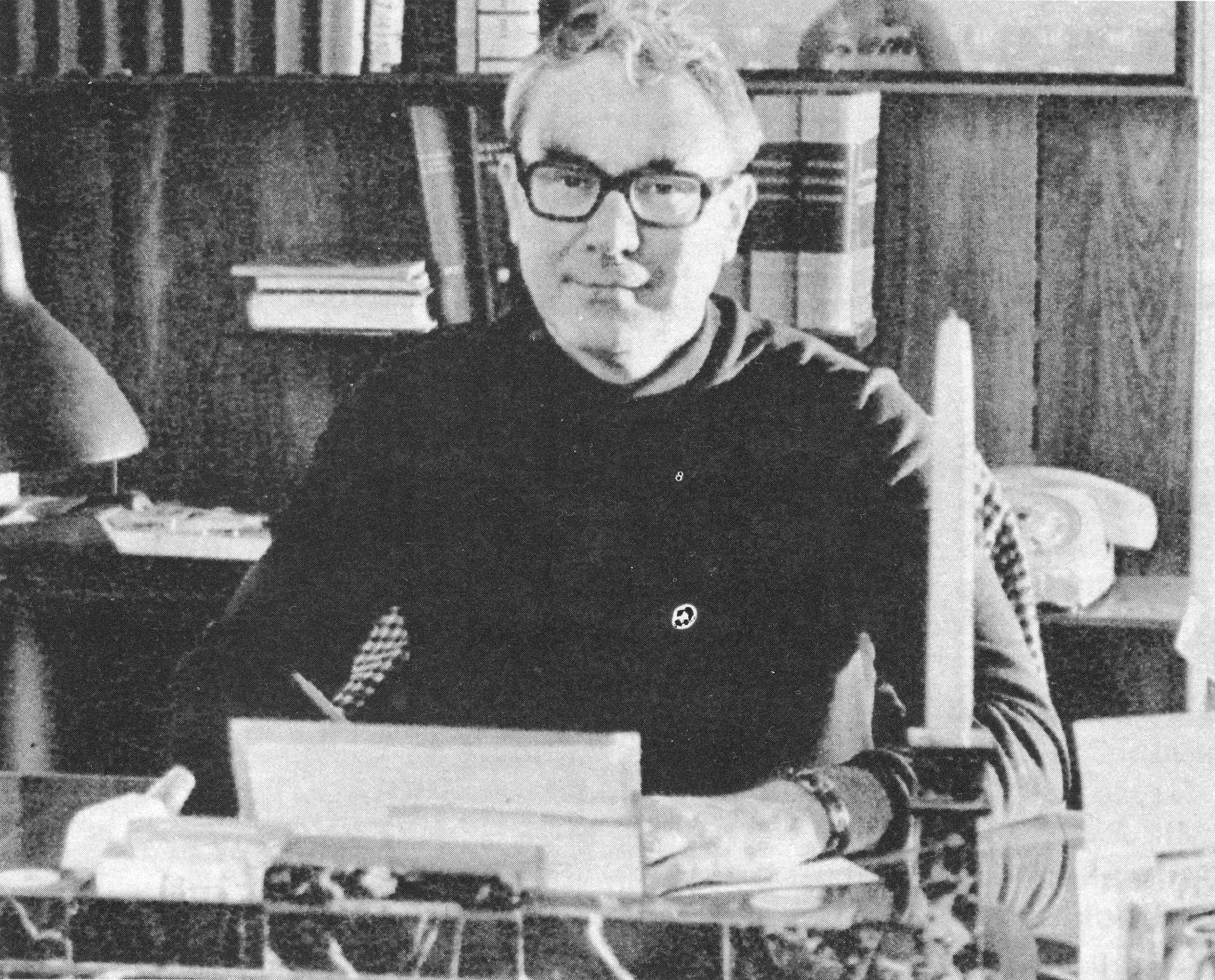
- Elmér, 1960s
- Born: Carl Gustaf Birger Elmér; 8 August 1919; Jönköping, Sweden
- Died: 8 November 1999 (aged 80); Jönköping, Sweden
- Occupation: Civil servant
- Known for: The IB affair
- Political party: Social Democratic

Carl Gustaf Birger Elmér (8 August 1919 – 8 November 1999) was a Swedish military and intelligence officer. Until 1975 he was the head of the Swedish Armed Forces' secret intelligence agency, known as IB.

== Awards and decorations ==
- (Sweden) Commander of the Order of the Polar Star (3 December 1974)
- (Sweden) Knight of the Order of the Polar Star (1966)

== Publications ==
- Elmér, Birger (1956). Propagandaanalys: en studie av sovjetiska radioytsändningar på svenska och finska språken åren 1952-1954 [Propaganda analysis: a study of Soviet radio broadcasts in the Swedish and Finnish languages in the years 1952-1954] (in Swedish). Stockholm: Beredskapsnämnden för psykologiskt försvar. SELIBR 1276050.
