= Oscar Birgersson =

Swiss ice hockey player

Oscar Brigersson
- Born: 8 April 2000 (age 25) Brynäs, Sweden
- Height: 6 ft 0 in (183 cm)
- Weight: 185 lb (84 kg; 13 st 3 lb)
- Position: Forward
- Shoots: Left
- team Former teams: Free Agent; Brynäs IF
- Playing career: 2019–present

Oscar Birgersson (born 8 April 2000) is a Swedish professional ice hockey player. He is currently an unrestricted free agent. He has previously played for Brynäs IF of the Swedish Hockey League (SHL). His youth team was Hofors HC.

== Career statistics ==
			Regular season					Playoffs
Season	Team	League	GP	G	A	Pts	PIM	GP	G	A	Pts	PIM
2016–17	Brynäs IF	J18	20	6	10	16	18	—	—	—	—	—
2017–18	Brynäs IF	J18	12	5	10	15	20	—	—	—	—	—
2017–18	Brynäs IF	J20	33	1	5	6	26	5	1	1	2	2
2018–19	Brynäs IF	J20	41	10	19	29	24	3	0	1	1	0
2019–20	Brynäs IF	J20	40	17	29	46	39	—	—	—	—	—
2019–20	Brynäs IF	SHL	14	1	1	2	4	—	—	—	—	—
2020–21	Brynäs IF	SHL	42	3	2	5	2	—	—	—	—	—
2021–22	Brynäs IF	J20	5	0	2	2	0	—	—	—	—	—
2021–22	Brynäs IF	SHL	44	1	5	6	2	3	0	1	1	0
2022–23	Brynäs IF	SHL	41	1	3	4	0	—	—	—	—	—
2022–23	Almtuna IS	Allsv	7	0	2	2	2	—	—	—	—	—
2023–24	Almtuna IS	Allsv	51	3	13	16	10	2	0	0	0	0
SHL totals			141	6	11	17	8	3	0	1	1	0
