= Swedish American Chamber of Commerce =

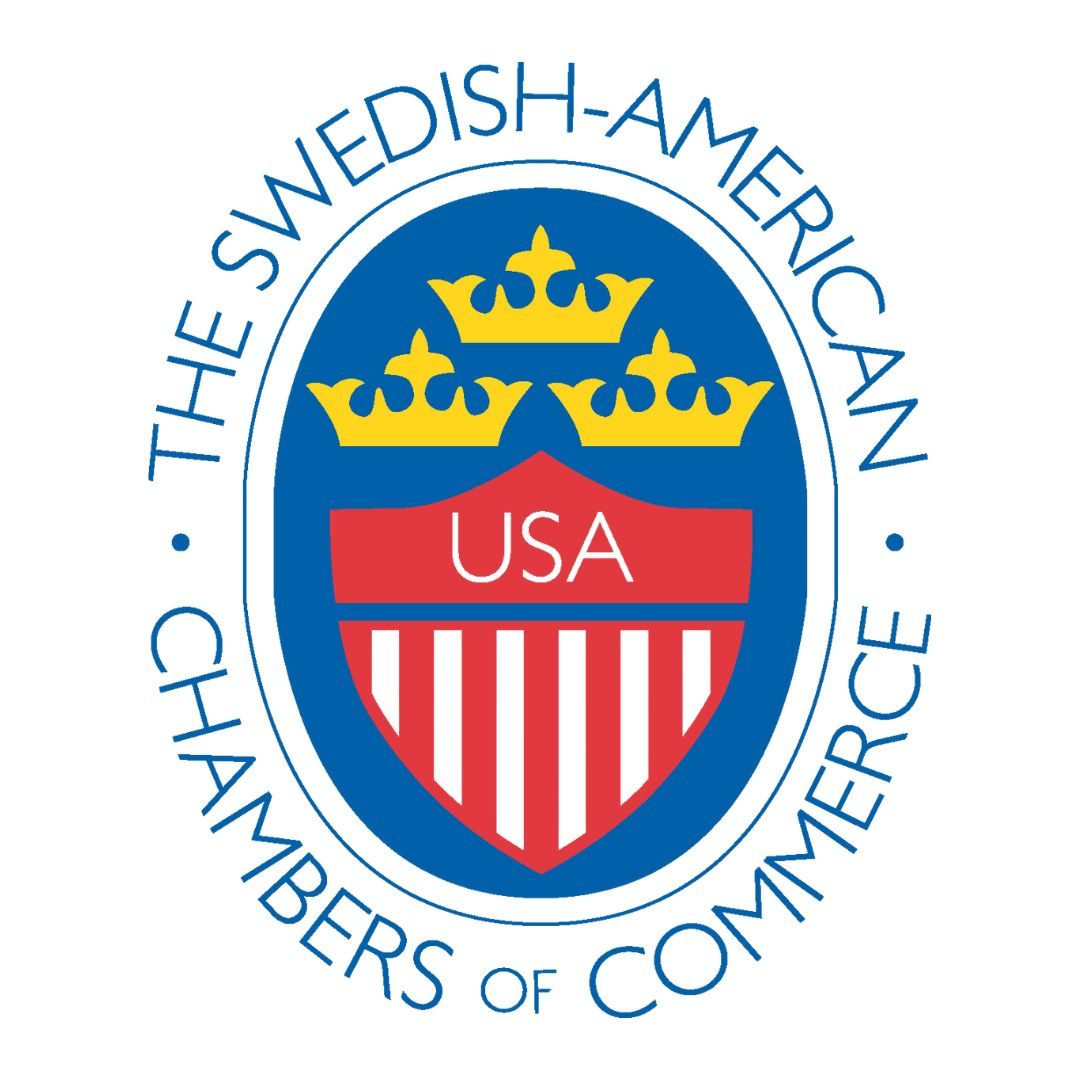

The Swedish-American Chambers of Commerce USA, (SACC-USA) is a non-profit umbrella organization, comprising 19 regional chambers of commerce. Founded in 1988, SACC-USA is headquartered at the House of Sweden, Washington, D.C. Since 2021, Karin Hammar has served as the chief executive officer of SACC-USA. The purpose of SACC-USA and the 19 regional Chambers of Commerce is to promote trade and investment between Sweden and the United States.

== Programs ==
SACC-USA organizes three key annual events: Executive Forum and SACC Summit in the United States, and Transatlantic Days in Sweden. Since 2023, the organization also presents the SACC-USA Business Award. The award is given annually in collaboration with the business newspaper Dagens Industri and aims to recognize fast-growing Swedish companies in the United States.

- Executive Forum is held annually at the House of Sweden in Washington, D.C., in collaboration with the Swedish Embassy. The event brings together business leaders, members of Congress, ambassadors, well-known experts, and representatives from both the American and Swedish governments.
- SACC Summit occurs each fall and is co-hosted by SACC-USA and one of its regional Chambers, taking place in the host Chamber's city. In 2024, the event was held in Chicago, Illinois, in partnership with SACC-Chicago. The 2023 Summit took place in Fort Lauderdale, Florida, with SACC-Florida. The 2025 edition is scheduled to be held in San Diego, California, in collaboration with SACC-San Diego.
- Transatlantic Day is held annually during the first quarter and was originally hosted in Stockholm. In 2025, the event expanded to also include Gothenburg. The conference coordinates several panels highlighting current issues in Swedish trade and Swedish-American relations.

SACC-USA also organizes business delegations for both Swedish companies interested in the U.S. market and American companies interested in the Swedish market. SACC-USA also facilitates talent exchange between Sweden and the United States through the Chamber's bilateral trainee program, the Talent Mobility Program.

SACC-USA collaborates with the Swedish Embassy in Washington as well as with Swedish consulates across the United States.

== History ==
The first Swedish-American Chamber of Commerce, SACC-New York, was founded in 1906 and was also Sweden's first international Chamber of Commerce. Over the years, an increasing number of Swedish companies became interested in the American market and began seeking ways to collaborate and support each other. As trade relations between the two countries developed, more Swedish companies established themselves in the U.S. market, while American companies began selling products in Sweden or offering trade services. By 1984, three Chambers of Commerce—located in New York, Atlanta, and San Francisco—had been established.

Olle Wijkström became president of SACC-New York in 1984. In 1986, Franklin S. Forsberg, former U.S. Ambassador to Sweden (1981–1985), was elected chairman of SACC-New York. Together, they worked to develop a broader network of Chambers and helped establish new regional Chambers of Commerce. When regional Swedish-American Chambers had been formed in eight cities by 1988, Wijkström and Forsberg took the initiative to create a coordinating umbrella organization—SACC-USA.

== Regional Chambers ==
The regional chambers of commerce who are members of SACC-USA are:

- SACC Arizona
- SACC Austin
- SACC Carolinas
- SACC Chicago
- SACC Colorado
- SACC Dallas
- SACC Detroit
- SACC Florida
- SACC Georgia
- SACC Houston
- SACC Los Angeles
- SACC Minnesota
- SACC New England
- SACC Ohio
- SACC Philadelphia
- SACC San Diego
- SACC San Francisco/Silicon Valley
- SACC Seattle
- SACC Washington DC
