= Birger Danielsson =

Swedish footballer

Personal information
- Date of birth: 13 December 1903
- Position: Defender

Senior career*
Years	Team	Apps	(Gls)
- Westermalm
- Djurgården
- * Club domestic league appearances and goals

Birger William Danielsson (born 13 December 1903) is a Swedish retired defender. Danielsson made 28 Svenska Serien and Allsvenskan appearances for Djurgården and scored 6 goals. Danielsson also played for Westermalms IF.

He was the internal top scorer at Djurgården in the 1924–25 and 1925–26 seasons.
