= Birgisson =

Birgisson is an Icelandic patronymic meaning 'son of Birgir'. Notable people with the surname include:

- Arnthor Birgisson (born 1976), Swedish songwriter and producer;
- Birgir Örn Birgisson (born 1969), Icelandic basketball coach and a former professional player;
- Gunnar Birgisson (1947–2021), Icelandic politician, a former member of the Alþingi and former mayor of Kópavogur;
- Jón Þór Birgisson (born 1975) or Jónsi, the guitarist and vocalist for the Icelandic post-rock band Sigur Rós;
- Steinar Birgisson (born 1955), Icelandic former handball player who competed in the 1984 Summer Olympics.
