= Folket i Bild/Kulturfront =

Swedish magazine

- Frequency: Monthly
- Founded: 1972
- Country: Sweden
- Based in: Skarpnäck
- Language: Swedish
- Website: fib.se
- ISSN: 0345-3073

Folket i Bild/Kulturfront (meaning Images of the People/Culture Front in English) is a Swedish magazine for reports, art, literature, debate and culture. It is published by the organization of the same name. The magazine is based in Stockholm.

== History ==
Folket i Bild (FiB, "people in pictures") was a Swedish illustrated news magazine (September 1934 -1963) owned by the Swedish Social Democratic Party. After it was sold to a commercial publisher in 1963, the name changed to FIB Aktuellt and it was remade into a gentlemen's magazine, gradually turning into pornography. As a reaction, the leftist-political Folket i Bild/Kulturfront (FiB/K) was founded in 1972. It was started on the initiative of the author Jan Myrdal. Its being was partly co-funded by the famous Swedish author Vilhelm Moberg and by handouts from factories and other places were the Swedish workers were.

The magazine arose to fame because of the scoop in the 1970s by Jan Guillou and Peter Bratt, who uncovered Informationsbyrån, run by the then ruling Swedish Social Democratic Party, and its connections to American and Israeli spy and intelligence organizations.

The paper had a big campaign against the new constitution of Sweden in 1973 and 1974, gathering many conservative lawyers and legal experts around the paper. The profile was often said to be "maoist". However, rightists were members of the organization and the paper crew, ever since the beginning.

Several famous journalists and authors have been members of the organization and staff, such as Henning Mankell, Jan Guillou, Gun Kessle and Göran Rosenberg.

== Purpose ==
The stated aims of the magazine are:

1. To work for the improvement in the culture of the people.
2. To work for free speech.
3. To work against imperialism.
