= Birger Forell =

Swedish priest

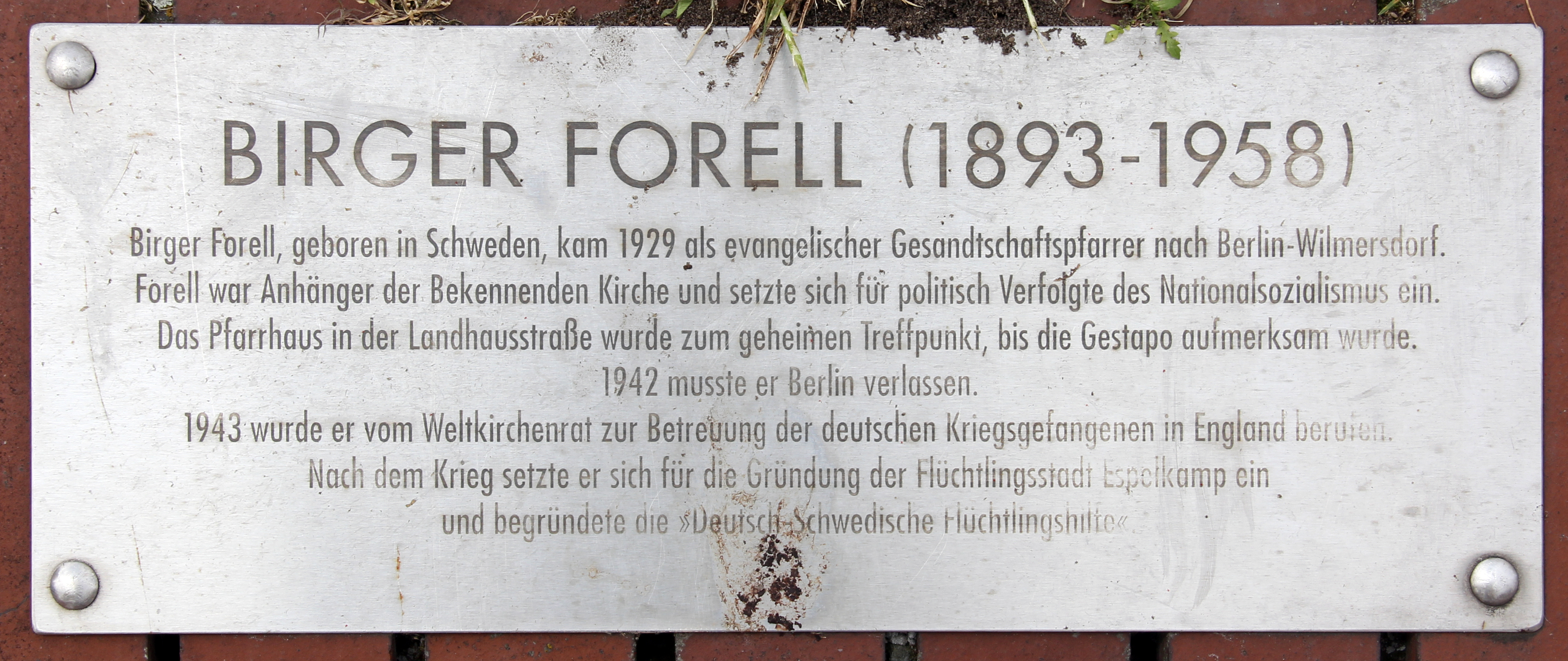
Birger Forell

Birger Forell (September 27, 1893 in Söderhamn, Sweden – July 4, 1958 in Borås, Sweden) was a Swedish Lutheran priest. He supported refugees and prisoners of war during the Second World War and afterwards.

Forell was one of the main influences at the Norton Prisoner of War camp in Norton, Cuckney England. Its students included Jurgen Moltmann who later became an eminent theologian.

There is a memorial dedicated to him in the Swedish Church in Berlin. In 1993, a postage stamp was released to commemorate his 100th birthday.
