= Börje Nilsson =

Börje Nilsson may refer to:

- Börje Nilsson (footballer), Swedish footballer
- Börje Nilsson (sport shooter), Swedish Olympic sport shooter
- Börje Nilsson (politician), Swedish politician, former member of the Riksdag
