= Das lila Lied =

1920s German cabaret song

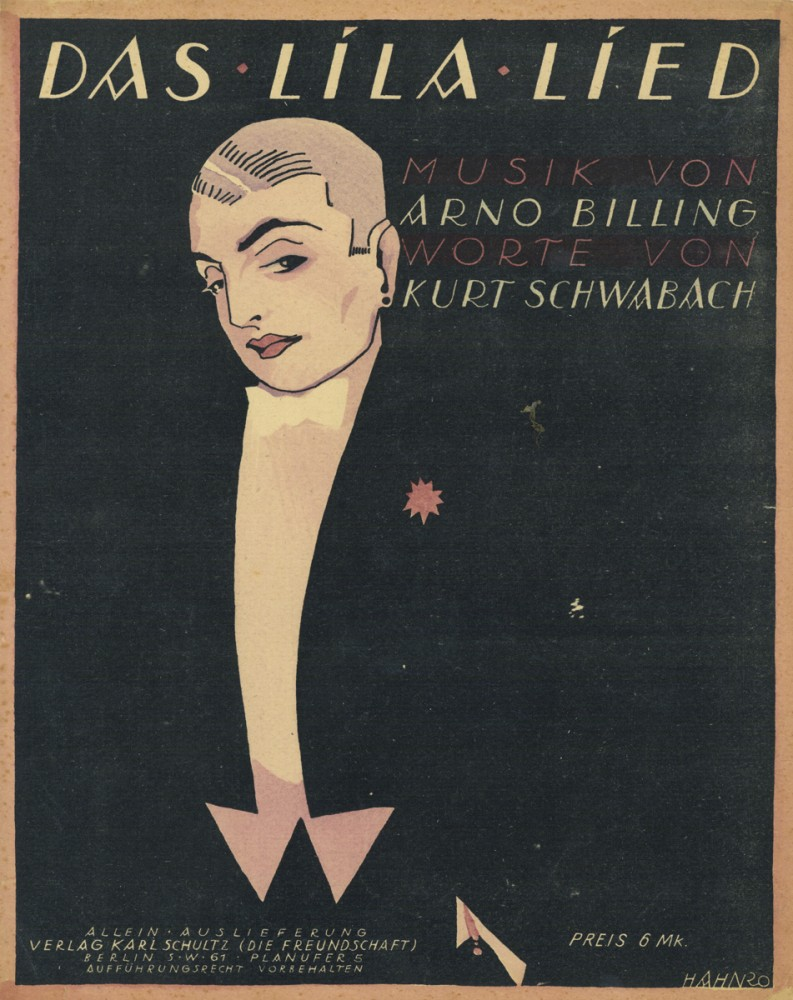
Sheet music cover

"Das lila Lied" (German for "The Lavender Song") is a German cabaret song written in 1920 with lyrics by Kurt Schwabach and music by Mischa Spoliansky and is considered one of the first gay anthems.

== History ==
The song is a product of Germany's Weimar Republic, during which time lesbians and gay men enjoyed a short period of improvement in quality of life when the government established basic democratic rights that covered the LGBT community and abolished censorship.

The song was written after the Institut für Sexualwissenschaft (Institute for Sexual Science) under Magnus Hirschfeld made worldwide news with its "First International Conference for Sexual Reform" which called for regulations on sexual behavior to be based on science instead of religion or other unscientific tradition.

The first line of the chorus, "Anders als die andern" (English: different from the others) is the same as the title of a 1919 gay rights film, Different from the Others, issued by Magnus Hirschfeld. This has been seen as the affirmation of a differentiated queer identity outside the hetereosexual mainstream.

== Lyrics and melody ==
German

Was will man nur?
Ist das Kultur,
dass jeder Mensch verpönt ist,
der klug und gut,
jedoch mit Blut
von eig'ner Art durchströmt ist,
dass g'rade die
Kategorie
vor dem Gesetz verbannt ist,
die im Gefühl
bei Lust und Spiel
und in der Art verwandt ist?

Und dennoch sind die Meisten stolz,
daß sie von ander'm Holz!

Refrain
Wir sind nun einmal anders als die andern,
die nur im Gleichschritt der Moral geliebt,
neugierig erst durch tausend Wunder wandern,
und für die's doch nur das Banale gibt.
Wir aber wissen nicht, wie das Gefühl ist,
denn wir sind alle and'rer Welten Kind,
wir lieben nur die lila Nacht, die schwül ist,
weil wir ja anders als die andern sind.

Wozu die Qual,
uns die Moral
der andern aufzudrängen?
Wir, hört geschwind,
sind wie wir sind,
selbst wollte man uns hängen.
Wer aber denkt,
daß man uns hängt,
den müßte man beweinen,
doch bald, gebt acht,
wird über Nacht
auch uns're Sonne scheinen.

Dann haben wir das gleiche Recht erstritten,
wir leiden nicht mehr, sondern sind gelitten!

Translation:

English

What do they want?
Is this culture
that every human is outlawed
who is – wise and well –
however with blood
of their own kind perfused
that nevertheless this
category
is banned by the law,
who is in feeling
in pleasure and playing
and in its kind related?

And still most of us are proud,
to be cut from different cloth!

Chorus
We are just different from the others
who are being loved only in lockstep of morality
who wander curiously through a thousand wonders
and who are only up to the trivial.
But we do not know what the feeling is
since we are all children of a different kind of world
we only love lavender night, who is sultry
because we are just different from the others!

Why the torment
to impose
morals of others on us?
We, listen to this,
are what we are,
even if they want to hang us.
But who thinks,
that we are going to be hanged
for that one we would have to feel sorry
but soon, listen up,
all of a sudden
our sun will be shining too.

Then we will have contended successfully for our rights
we will not suffer anymore, but we will be tolerated!
