= Birger Warneby =

Swedish footballer

Senior career*
Years	Team	Apps	(Gls)
- Djurgården
- * Club domestic league appearances and goals

Birger Warneby is a Swedish retired footballer. Warneby made 20 Allsvenskan appearances for Djurgården and scored 0 goals.
