= Börje Persson =

Swedish footballer

Personal information
- Full name: Börje Persson
- Position: Midfielder

Senior career*
Years	Team	Apps	(Gls)
1941–1944	Malmö FF	30	(7)
- * Club domestic league appearances and goals

Börje Persson was a Swedish footballer who played as a midfielder.
