= Nils Heribert-Nilsson =

Swedish botanist and geneticist

Nils Heribert-Nilsson (26 May 1883 in Skivarp, Scania – 3 August 1955) was a Swedish botanist and geneticist.

Heribert-Nilsson received his Ph.D. at Lund University in 1915 with the thesis Die Spaltungserscheinungen der Oenothera lamarckiana. From 1934 to 1948 he was professor of botany, in particular systematics, morphology and plant geography, at Lund University.

Heribert-Nilsson was active in plant breeding. His most important research concerned Salix and its taxonomy, which is complicated by frequent hybridization. Among his research on Salix was hybridization studies on Salix viminalis and Salix caprea.

In 1943 he was elected a member of the Royal Swedish Academy of Sciences.

== Emication ==
In 1953, Heribert-Nilsson published his most voluminous work Synthetische Artbildung ("Synthetic speciation"). In a review for Science, Joel Hedgpeth summarizes the thesis of the "elegantly printed two-volume opus" as follows:

The concept of evolution as a continuously flowing process can be proved only on Lamarckian lines, since "evolution and Lamarckism are inseparable because they include the same fundamental ideas." There is no proof from the data of genetic recombinations or mutations to support the generally accepted concept of evolution; therefore, evolution is not occurring at this time. Nor does it seem to have occurred in the past, since the fossil record is the result of piling up and preservation of world biota during the periods when the nearness of the moon induced tremendous tidal action (the "Tethys sea") and freezing at high latitudes because of the pulling of air toward the equator hastened such preservation. During these revolutionary periods there was resynthesis of the entire world biota by gene material or gametes along the same basic lines (hence, there is no point to phylogenies, since the similarities of organic life are due to the synthetic activity of similar "gametes"); this process is termed "emication".

Oblivious to continental drift (not a commonly accepted theory at the time), Heribert-Nilsson invokes tremendous tsunamis for the fact that many fossil floras, such as that of the London Clay, consist of species whose modern relatives live in tropical countries far removed from the site of deposition, as G. Ledyard Stebbins writes in an article for The Quarterly Review of Biology in 1955.

According to Stebbins Heribert-Nilsson's final line of "evidence" against evolution consists of an attempt to criticise certain basic principles of genetics, particularly the linear order of the genes on the chromosomes.

== Selected publications ==
- Die Spaltungserscheinungen der Oenothera lamarckiana, Ph.D. Thesis, 1915.
- Experimentelle Studien über Variabilität, Spaltung, Artbildung und Evolution in der Gattung Salix, 1918.
- Synthetische Bastardierungsversuche in der Gattung Salix, 1930.
- Linné, Darwin, Mendel: trenne biografiska skisser ("Linnaeus, Darwin, Mendel: three biographic sketches"), popular science, 1930.
- Der Entwicklungsgedanke und die moderne Biologie ("The development thought and modern biology"), 1941.
- Synthetische Artbildung: Grundlinien einer exakten Biologie, 2 vols., 1953.
