= IB affair =

Swedish surveillance scandal

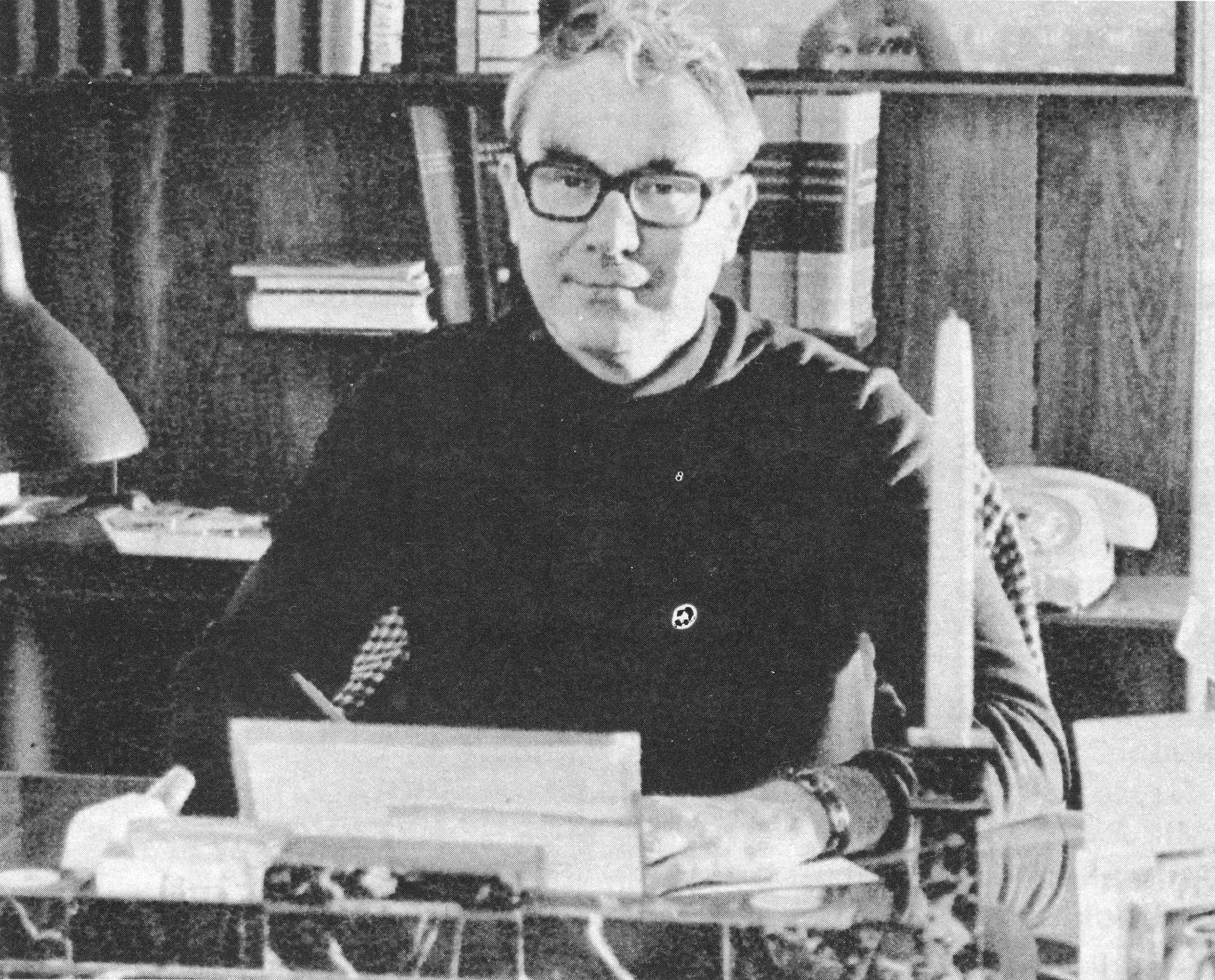
Birger Elmér, director for IB 1965–1975

The IB affair (Swedish: IB-affären) was the exposure of illegal surveillance operations by the IB secret Swedish intelligence agency within the Swedish Armed Forces. The two main purposes of the agency were to handle liaison with foreign intelligence agencies and to gather information about communists and other individuals who were perceived to be a threat to the nation.

== History ==
The meaning of the name IB is not known with certainty. It is often said to be an abbreviation of either Informationsbyrån (The Information Office, Information Bureau) or Insamling Birger ([Information-]Gathering Birger, after its director Birger Elmér). This is, however, speculation, and neither name was in general use within the organization.

The key persons leading to the exposure of the IB were journalists Jan Guillou and Peter Bratt and their original main source Håkan Isaksson. The two reporters revealed their findings in the leftist magazine Folket i Bild/Kulturfront on 3 May 1973. The story was immediately picked up by many leading Swedish dailies. Their revelations were that:

- There was a secret intelligence agency in Sweden called IB, without official status. Its director Birger Elmér was reporting directly to select key persons at cabinet level, most likely defence minister Sven Andersson and Prime Minister Olof Palme.
- The Riksdag was unaware of its activities.
- People with far-left views had been monitored and registered.
- IB agents had infiltrated Swedish left-wing organisations and sometimes tried to induce them into criminal acts.
- There were Swedish spies operating abroad.
- IB spies had broken into the Egyptian and Algerian embassies in Stockholm.
- The IB co-operated extensively with the Central Intelligence Agency and Shin Bet, in contrast to the official Swedish foreign policy of neutrality.

In the following issues of Folket i Bild/Kulturfront the two uncovered further activities of IB and interviewed a man who had infiltrated the Swedish movement supporting the FNL, Vietnamese National Front for the Liberation of South Vietnam – at this time the FNL support network was a backbone of the radical opinion – and among other things, visited Palestinian guerilla camps in Jordan. The man worked for IB and had composed reports that, it was surmised, IB later passed on to the Israeli security services which resulted in the camps being bombed. The man, Gunnar Ekberg, claimed in his interview to have broken with IB, but in fact was still working for the organization. This was exposed in the following editions of FiB/Kulturfront, but by that time, Ekberg had gone underground. Swedish authorities claimed they were unable to locate him to stand trial. In 2009, he released an autobiography of his years in IB, attacking Guillou in particular for having misrepresented facts, been involved with Palestinian militant groups (particularly the Popular Front for the Liberation of Palestine and Democratic Front for the Liberation of Palestine), and worked for the KGB; and alleging widespread terrorist ties to the groups and persons monitored by IB. He also confirmed that he had been transferred from IB to the Mossad, an Israeli intelligence agency, immediately prior to his exposure.

Guillou had opened the first article by accusing the director of IB of murder on these grounds. The same issue exposed a Swedish naval captain who had passed reports about the harbor security of Alexandria (implying, again, that IB were exchanging information with the Israelis); also the story of a woman who had, on the orders of IB, spied out potential bombing targets in Egypt.

The magazine had information from a previous employee of IB, Håkan Isacson, who claimed that IB had broken into the offices of two political organizations: the FNL Groups, a pro-North Vietnamese organization, and the Communist Party of Sweden, a Maoist political party. This concerned a Jordanian citizen and a stateless citizen. A wiretap was installed in the latter case. After this uncovering, the defense minister did admit that IB engaged in espionage outside of Sweden and infiltrated organizations within Sweden, including wiretaps.

Evidence was put forth in 1974 that IB had built up a large network of agents in Finland, which included the Finnish foreign minister Väinö Leskinen. This network's main mission was to gather information regarding the Soviet Union. IB had no contacts with the Finnish Security Intelligence Service, since it was believed to have been infiltrated by Soviet agents.

== Government response ==
In November 1973, Prime Minister Olof Palme denied any link between IB and the Social Democrats. However, according to the memoir of ex-security service chief P.G. Vinge, Birger Elmér had regular contact with Palme and made his reports regularly to the Social Democratic Party secretary, Sven Andersson.

Defence minister Sven Andersson denied that Sweden had spies abroad. He also denied that IB was involved in burglaries and documenting citizens' political opinions.

== Legal consequences and investigations ==
Jan Guillou, Peter Bratt, Håkan Isaksson and the photographer Ove Holmqvist were arrested 22 October 1973 by the Swedish Security Service on suspicion of espionage. On 4 January 1974 each was sentenced to 1 year in prison. Bratt and Guillou were both convicted of espionage; Isaksson was convicted of espionage and accessory to espionage. After an appeal, Guillou's sentence was commuted to 10 months. The Swedish Supreme Court would not consider the case.

The Parliamentary Ombudsman investigated the IB organisation but came to the conclusion that they had not broken any laws. Concerning the break-ins to the leftists' organization, the Ombudsman stated that since the personnel of IB had entered the premises using a key or a lock-pick and had not stolen anything it could not be considered a crime.

In 2002 an extensive public report, named Rikets säkerhet och den personliga integriteten (Security of the Realm and personal integrity), was published on the operations of IB. This report clarified the details of the case, but it did not have any legal impact.

To date, no member of IB has ever been indicted, nor has any politician or government official, despite the revelation of widespread extra-constitutional and criminal activity.
