= Myriam Birger =

French musician

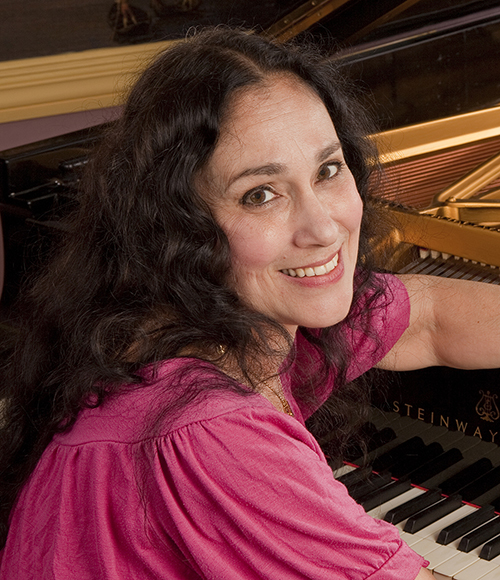
Myriam Birger in 2012

Myriam Birger, known as "The little girl with hands of gold", is a French pianist.

== Biography ==
Born in Normandy, the French pianist Myriam Birger comes from a family of artists.

Her father, Dr. Karol Birger, had left his native Poland as a young man to join Dr. Albert Schweitzer with whom he worked closely in Africa for several years.

Myriam Birger began to play piano at a young age. Her mother tried to persuade her Birger's brother to start piano lessons, it appeared that Myriam, aged six, needed no persuasion to sit at the piano: she was immediately drawn to the instrument. Two years later, Myriam, a real child prodigy, gave her first public concert at the age of eight in the Concert Hall of the Conservatoire de Paris.

Myriam entered the Conservatoire National Supérieur de Paris when she was eleven years old, joining Lucette Descaves's class. She graduated top of her class and was awarded the First Prize in Piano at the age of thirteen, the youngest recipient ever in the institution, and gathered numerous prizes including in chamber music. Afterward, she performed for the first time in the Théâtre des Champs-Elysées.

When she was fifteen, Myriam hit the headlines when she won a prize at the Long-Thibaud-Crespin Competition, and at sixteen, she made a debut on television playing the second Chopin Concerto with orchestra. There, she was noticed by pianist Samson François. François, impressed and moved by her gift, decided to become her mentor.

After turning eighteen, Birger was invited by the American pianist Byron Janis to go and work with him. Doing this, she ended up spending a year in the United States.

Back in France, an event introduced her to the public: The photo magazine Paris Match relayed the victory of "a young and beautiful pianist, Myriam Birger" in a popular radio quiz: Myriam had won a pretty sum answering a question about Beethoven. Following a radio show, she was invited to Luxembourg where she performed a full concert featuring an orchestra which was broadcast by RTL, the radio station.

During those years, she met François-René Duchâble who subsequently introduced her to Arthur Rubinstein. Birger also met Mstislav Rostropovich who then introduced her to the trumpet player Maurice André.

André invited Myriam to participate in Jacques Chancel's TV show Le Grand Echiquier where she met the Ruggero Raimondi, the trumpet player Dizzie Gillespie and the singer-song writer Yves Duteil as well as other prestigious artists. With her fellow musicians Bruno Rigutto and Lucien Akoka, she has taken part in the creation of the Maisons-Alfort Music Conservatory, a music school in the Val-de-Marne next to Paris, which is now a certified State school.

At the end of the 80s, Birger went away from the stage to explore her life. She started a family and became a mother, naming her daughter Ornella.

She has since appeared on stage for rare occasions, such as a recital at the Salle Pleyel Concert Hall, sponsored by Bernard Arnault for LVMH, and a concert organized by the Paris Town Hall (mairie de Paris).

Birger has recently taken part in "A Dialogue of Civilizations through Music", an event organized by the Qatar Embassy and the Arab World Institute (IMA).

She created an online music theory course.
