= Birger Malling =

Norwegian ophthalmologist (1884–1989)

Birger Malling (8 June 1884 – 8 December 1989) was a Norwegian ophthalmologist and educator.

He was born in Bergen as a son of district stipendiary magistrate Michael Vilhelm Malling (1843–1918) and Marie Eleonora Henrichsen (1856–1944). From 1913 he was married to Helga Seeberg Tønnessen (1890–1966). He attended Bergen Cathedral School. He finished his secondary education in 1902 and graduated with the cand.med. degree in 1910, proceeding to take the dr.med. degree in 1919.

He practised as an ophthalmologist in Tromsø from 1913 to 1922, Bergen from 1922 to 1939 and Oslo after 1954. Between 1939 and 1954 he was a professor of medicine at the University of Oslo and chief physician at the Rikshospitalet. He chaired Norske Øyenlægers Forening from 1932 to 1933 and was an editorial board member of Medicinsk Revue. He was a fellow of the Norwegian Academy of Science and Letters from 1941, Swedish Society of Medicine (Svenska Läkaresällskapet) from 1945 and was decorated as a Knight, First Class of the Order of St. Olav in 1959. He died in 1989 and was buried at Strømsø kirkegård in Drammen.
