= Birger Pedersen (Norwegian footballer) =

Norwegian footballer (1910-1969)

Personal information
- Date of birth: 1 February 1910
- Date of death: 22 January 1969 (aged 58)
- Place of death: Bergen, Norway
- Position: Forward

International career
Years	Team	Apps	(Gls)
1934–1936	Norway	2	(1)

Birger Pedersen (1 February 1910 – 22 January 1969) was a Norwegian footballer. He played in two matches for the Norway national football team from 1934 to 1936. He was also part of Norway's squad for the football tournament at the 1936 Summer Olympics, but he did not play in any matches.
