= Håkan Isacson =

Håkan Elis Isaksson (10 November 1943 – 23 April 2002) was a Swedish intelligence agent who became known as the whistleblower of the IB affair, a political scandal in Sweden in the 1970s. Isaksson was a former employee at IB, a secret Swedish domestic intelligence organization, who was used as the source by journalists Peter Bratt and Jan Guillou when they made the existence of the organization public in May 1973. On 4 January 1974 Isaksson, along with Bratt and Guillou, was convicted of espionage by the Stockholm District Court and sentenced to 12 months in prison.

Isaksson was a closeted homosexual.
