= Jon Birger =

American journalist

Jon Birger is an American freelance writer, speaker and author of Date-Onomics: How Dating Became a Lopsided Numbers Game.

== Career ==
A business journalist, Birger is a former senior writer at Fortune and Money magazines and continues to contribute to Fortune. He has contributed to Barron’s, Bloomberg BusinessWeek, New York, Time, and The Washington Post.
