= Birger Kajanus =

Swedish biologist (1882–1931)

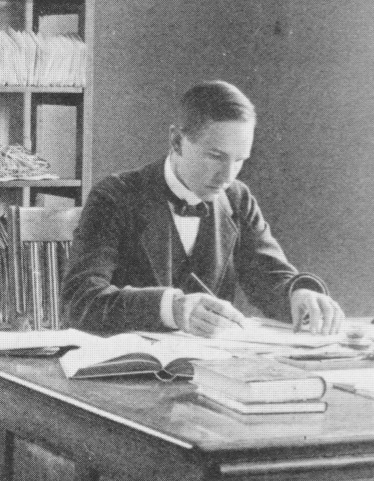
- Birger Kajanus
- Born: Birger Nilsson; 20 November 1882; Malmö, Sweden
- Died: 5 August 1931 (aged 48); Cairo, Egypt
- Education: Lund University
- Known for: Early lichenological studies of the Sarek region; genetic studies on beet, poppy and wheat; wheat cultivar Standard; establishment of a large pea germplasm collection at Weibullsholm
- Scientific career
- Fields: Botany, Genetics, Plant breeding, Lichenology
- Workplaces: Lund University; W. Weibull AB, Weibullsholm; cotton-breeding company in Egypt
- Author abbrev. (botany): Nilson (–1907); Kajanus (1911–)

Birger Kajanus (born Birger Nilsson; 20 November 1882 – 5 August 1931) was a Swedish botanist, geneticist, plant breeder and lichenologist. As a young student at Lund University he published pioneering work on lichens, proposing a new theory of soredia and isidia formation, and participated in early lichenological exploration of the Sarek mountains in northern Sweden. He later became a leading figure at the plant-breeding station Weibullsholm near Landskrona, where he carried out extensive Mendelian studies on beetroot, poppy and wheat and bred several successful crop varieties, notably the wheat cultivar Standard. In the mid-1920s he emigrated to Egypt to work as a cotton breeder, and he spent his final years there.

== Early life and education ==
Kajanus was born on 20 November 1882 in Malmö, Sweden. As a student in Lund he immersed himself in independent studies of lichens and quickly began publishing scientific work. His early papers did not merely report floristic discoveries but advanced a new and ambitious theory on the formation of soredia and isidia.

In 1903 he accepted an invitation to take charge of the lichenological component of Axel Hamberg's large-scale investigation of the Sarek region. During this first major research expedition as a lichenologist he endured severe snowstorms in the mountains of Lapland, an experience later contrasted with his final work as a cotton breeder under the Egyptian sun. After the Lapland expedition he remained loyal to lichenology for several years, returning to Lund to teach successive cohorts of students.

During this period he lived an austere and inwardly focused life, absorbed in lichens, philosophical problems and literature, and he showed open disdain for examinations and conventional academic expectations. Economic pressures eventually led him to a position on a farm near Landskrona, where plans were being made to establish a plant-breeding institute at Weibullsholm. To improve his social position he completed the fil. kand. degree with an unconventional combination of subjects: botany, German, aesthetics, and both practical and theoretical philosophy. He had marked philological talent, speaking and writing elegantly in several major languages; by the end of his life he was said to have command of nearly a dozen.

Kajanus also engaged with literature, translating Fyodor Dostoevsky's work Lifvets paradoxer ("The Paradoxes of Life"), which was published in 1909. According to his contemporary Nils Heribert-Nilsson, Kajanus was indifferent to intellectual fashion and economic fluctuations, maintaining an independent researcher's stance regardless of how eccentric he appeared to others.

== Lichenological research ==
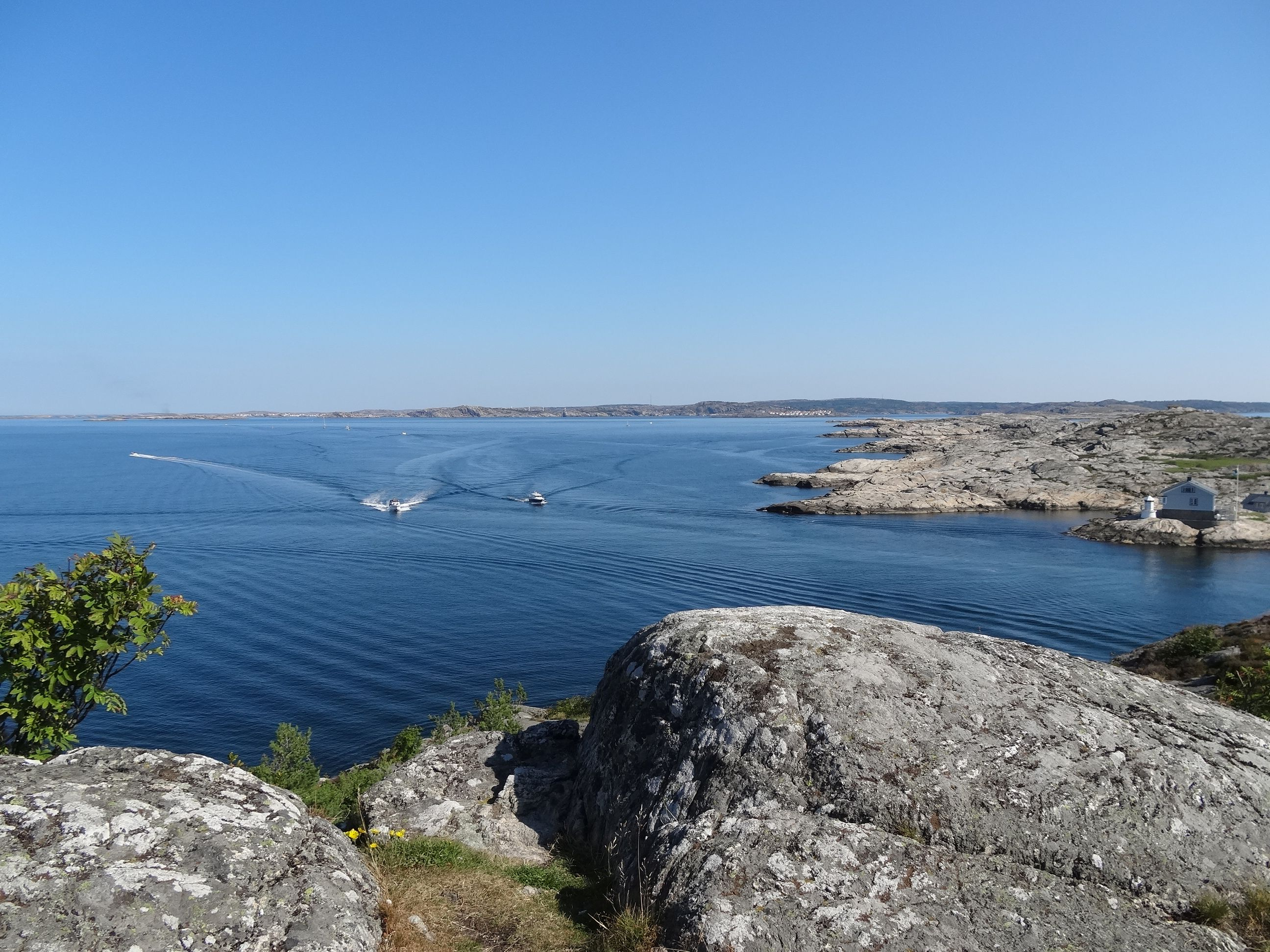
Coastal landscape on and around Marstrand, the area treated in Kajanus's 1919 booklet on the island's lichens.

Before leaving Lund, Kajanus summarised his Lapland lichen studies in the monograph Die Flechtenvegetation des Sarekegebirges, which presented both floristic results and his new lichen theory. He further developed these ideas in a later work, Morphologische Flechtenstudien (1911). Although other responsibilities gradually took precedence, his enduring attachment to lichenology is evident from a small booklet published in 1919, Lavar på Marstrandsön enligt samlingar av professor O. Nordstedt, which treated the lichens of the island of Marstrand based on collections by the botanist Otto Nordstedt.

== Genetic research and plant breeding ==
At Weibullsholm, near Landskrona, Kajanus became a central figure in the development of plant breeding in Sweden. As Mendelian genetics gained prominence in the country, he redirected his research from lichens to problems of heredity in cultivated plants, viewing plant breeding and genetics as closely linked. Contemporary accounts of Swedish genetics described him as having a "versatile" mind and emphasised that he worked on a wide range of genera and characters, bringing together his results in broader treatments of the inheritance of root colour and shape in Beta and Brassica, and of flower colour and other traits in Papaver somniferum. They also noted that his theoretical position moved from enthusiastic Mendelism through phases of Lamarckian scepticism and back towards a pragmatic Mendelian approach, and that his work on Papaver was regarded as a strictly analytical study of segregation patterns.

In his early years at Weibullsholm he worked chiefly on root crops, especially Beta (beet) and Brassica (cabbages). These studies culminated in his 1913 doctoral dissertation, Über die Vererbungsweise gewisser Merkmale der Beta- und Brassica-Rüben, based on hybrid-analytic experiments. Difficulties in explaining the highly variable segregation ratios in his Beta crosses within a simple Mendelian framework initially led him to scepticism about Mendelism, and he proposed that his results could be interpreted as evidence for interactions among unstable genes and stabilising modifications. Kajanus elaborated his critical stance in the treatise Zur Kritik des Mendelismus, where he expressed sympathy for Lamarckian ideas. Nilsson characterises this period as one in which Kajanus reacted strongly against theories that were becoming widely accepted, driven more by an attraction to novel ideas than by adherence to any single school of thought. However, when the role of local environmental conditions in segregation ratios came under renewed scrutiny and he resumed his Beta investigations, he provided a relatively straightforward biological and factorial explanation for the observed patterns, thereby returning to a Mendelian interpretation.

Beginning in 1911 he undertook major experiments with reciprocal crosses, and in 1912 he began large-scale analyses of Papaver somniferum (opium poppy). The poppy study, which took full advantage of clear morphological differences and large segregation generations, was especially important in shaping his mature Mendelian outlook. His comprehensive synthesis of the Papaver experiments was published in 1919.

Kajanus then embarked on even more extensive investigations of wheat genetics. Smaller series of experiments were published earlier, but his major contribution appeared in 1923 in the series Bibliotheca genetica, edited by Erwin Baur. This work was based on an analysis of 150,000 individual plants from 22 crosses, involving different Triticum vulgare races and crosses with forms such as compactum, spelta, turgidum and dicoccum. Of particular importance were his studies of certain vulgare mutants and their relationships to other species, including forms later denoted as spelloides and subcompactum. On the basis of these investigations he proposed that, apart from T. monococcum, cultivated wheats should be grouped under two species, T. acuminatum (including the emmer series) and T. obtusatum (including the vulgare series).

Alongside these major projects, Kajanus carried out numerous smaller studies on genera such as Brassica, Pisum, Phaseolus, Lupinus, Trifolium, Hordeum, Festuca and Nicotiana, examining a diverse array of traits. He was also active as a populariser of natural science.

== Plant breeding achievements ==
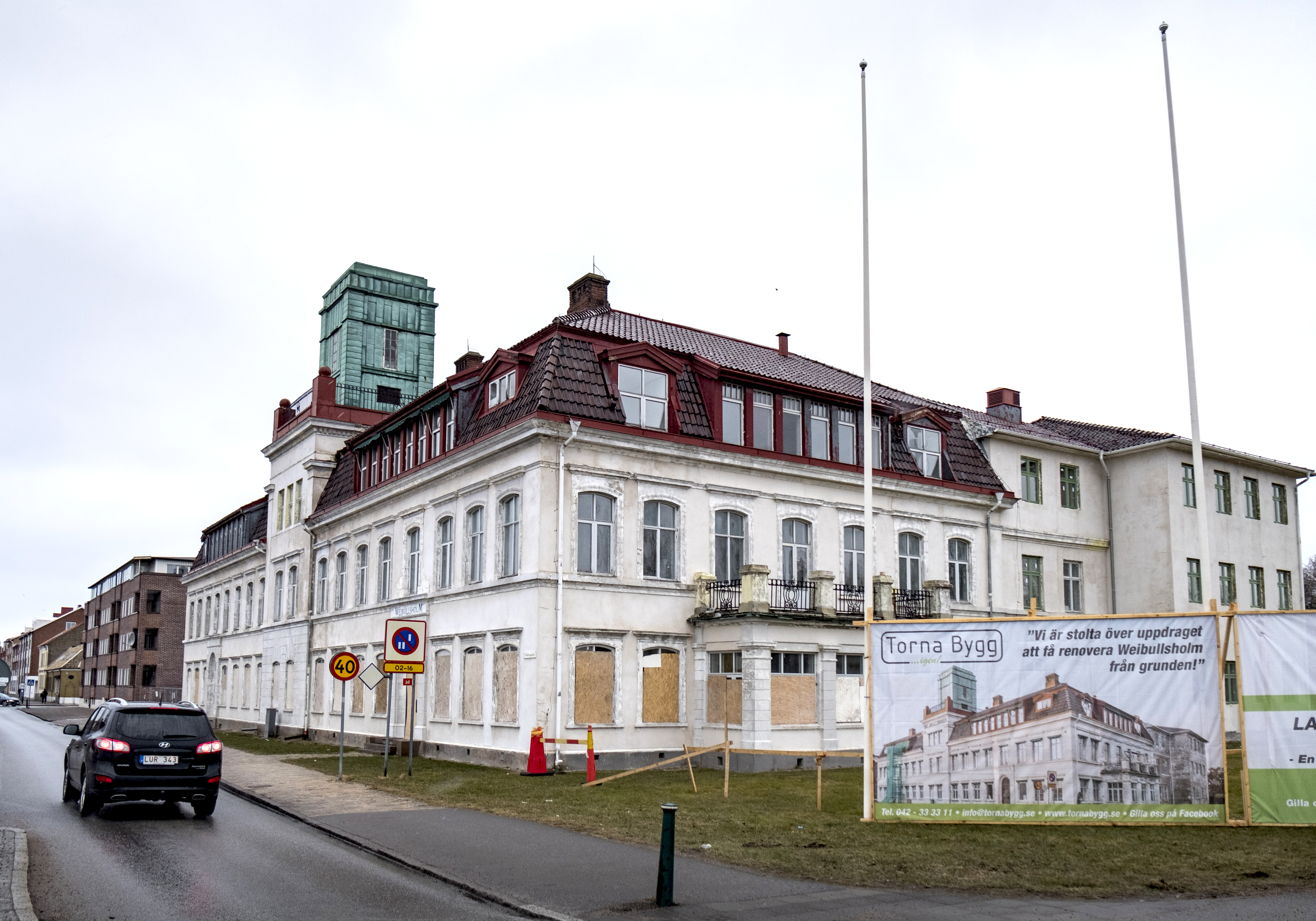
The former Weibullsholm plant-breeding station of W. Weibull AB in Landskrona, where Kajanus carried out much of his genetic and plant-breeding work

Despite his theoretical bent and an avowed indifference to commercial plant breeding, Kajanus achieved considerable success as a practical breeder. Nilsson credits him with demonstrating how the freedom of theoretical research can lead to significant applied results in agriculture.

During his career he bred numerous crop varieties, and several remained on the market for many years after he left active plant breeding. His most notable cultivar was the wheat variety Standard, which, according to Nilsson, displaced competing varieties and retained its position for at least a decade, an unusually long lifespan for a wheat cultivar of that period. At Weibullsholm, Kajanus also initiated a large pea germplasm collection around 1915. Later surveys of Nordic plant genetic resources describe this collection as one of the world's largest, noting that by 1990 it contained 3,427 accessions from landraces, improved lines, mutation lines and wild relatives, with records for roughly 200 individual genes and about 45 quantitative characters, and that the Weibullsholm pea collection became a model for documentation of genetic resources.

== Emigration to Egypt and later life ==
Although his work at Weibullsholm brought recognition, Kajanus became uncomfortable with the personal circumstances that accompanied the success of Standard. Preferring to avoid disputes over credit, he chose to leave rather than remain in what he regarded as an untenable situation.

In early 1925 he emigrated to Egypt to take a position as a cotton breeder in a newly established German–Egyptian company. He had long wished to work in the tropics, although the dry, barren landscapes and climate of Egypt proved physically demanding. Initially he continued an active scientific life and in 1927 published a major review of wheat genetics, summarising a literature of more than 200 publications. This demanding survey appears to have marked the end of his published scientific work; during the last five years of his life he published nothing further, although he continued work on wheat, peas and cotton.

According to Nilsson, a combination of climatic, economic and social factors contributed to Kajanus becoming increasingly restless and depressed in his final years. In the spring of 1931 he contracted typhoid fever, which severely weakened him, and he died in early August that year.

== Personality and legacy ==
Nilsson portrays Kajanus as a highly gifted yet unusually sensitive individual, inclined to withdraw into his own sphere. To strangers he could appear distant or even superior, but among friends he was reportedly open and warm, a devoted discussant of scientific problems and a witty conversationalist. His humour was described as sharp yet good-natured, and his irony served as both defence and weapon throughout his life.

Kajanus combined early contributions to lichenology with extensive work in plant genetics and breeding. Nilsson regarded him as one of the unusual figures in science, whose independent thinking and willingness to question accepted ideas, coupled with practical achievements such as the wheat variety Standard, gave him a distinctive place in Swedish botanical and agricultural history.

== Selected publications ==
- Kajanus, Birger (1907). Die Flechtenvegetation des Sarekgebirges [The lichen vegetation of the Sarek mountains]. Naturwissenschaftliche Untersuchungen des Sarekgebirges in Schwedisch-Lappland (in German). Vol. 3. Stockholm: Fritze. pp. 1–70.
- ——————— (1911). "Morphologische Flechtenstudien" [Morphological lichen studies]. Arkiv för Botanik (in German). 10 (4): 1–47.
- ——————— (1919). "Lavar på Marstrandsön enligt samlingar av Professor O. Nordstedt" [Lichens on the island of Marstrand according to collections by Professor O. Nordstedt]. Botaniska Notiser (in Swedish). 1919: 207–212.
- ——————— (1911). "Genetische Studien an Beta" [Genetic studies on Beta]. Zeitschrift für induktive Abstammungs- und Vererbungslehre (in German). 6: 137–179. doi:10.1007/BF01778354.
- ——————— (1923). Genetische Untersuchungen an Weizen [Genetic investigations on wheat]. Bibliotheca Genetica (in German). Vol. 5. Leipzig: Gebrüder Borntraeger. pp. 1–187.
- ——————— (1927). "Die Ergebnisse der genetischen Weizenforschung: eine Orientierung" [The results of genetic wheat research: an overview]. Bibliographia Genetica (in German). 3: 141–244.
