= GetYourGuide =

German online travel activities marketplace

- Website type: privately held company
- Available in: 37 languages
- Founded: 2009; 17 years ago in Zurich, Switzerland
- Headquarters: Berlin, {{{location_country}}}
- Area served: worldwide
- Founders: Johannes Reck; Tao Tao; Tobias Rein; Martin Sieber; Pascal Mathis
- Key people: Johannes Reck (CEO); Tao Tao (COO)
- Industry: tourism
- Products: online marketplace
- Employees: 1000+
- Website: www.getyourguide.com

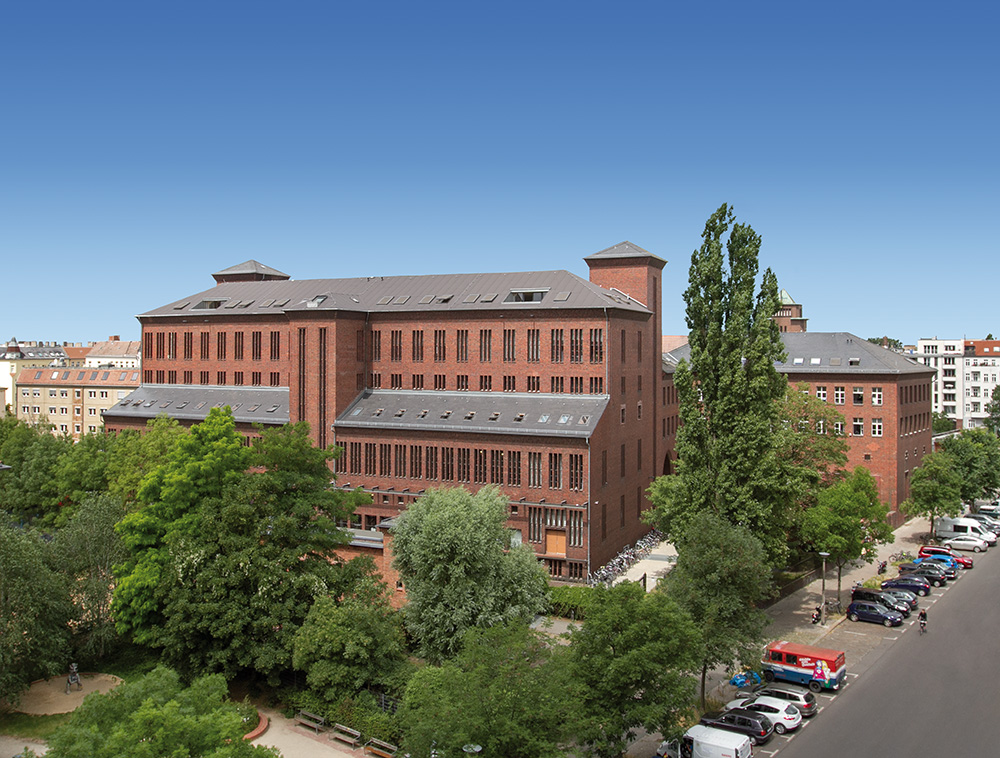
Headquarters in Berlin

GetYourGuide is a German online marketplace for tour guides, excursions, travel-related activities, and tickets to tourist attractions. It offers more than 150,000 'experiences' from more than 20,000 supply partners worldwide, some of which use the GetYourGuide branding. In the third quarter of 2025, the company reported 10 million 'experiences' booked.

Providers list their service on the platform and are charged a commission on sales. The website features an online customer review system; operators are required to perform to certain standards.

== History ==
On a trip to Beijing in 2009, Johannes Reck arrived a day early and had trouble navigating the city; his experience improved greatly after he was shown around by his friend and classmate at ETH Zurich, Tao Tao, and they sensed a market for local tour guides. They developed a business plan for a peer-to-peer Internet platform that connected tourists with amateur guides. The plan was expanded and refined to an internet booking platform for professional tours and activities. That year, they founded GetYourGuide. Initially, the company was funded by friends and family members. GetYourGuide was initially headquartered in Zurich. It relocated its headquarters in 2012 to Berlin to raise venture capital.

In early January 2013, the company raised $14 million in a Series A round with investments from Spark Capital and Highland Capital Partners. In late January 2013, it added $4.5 million in funding from investors including Kees Koolen.

In April 2013, GetYourGuide acquired Gidsy, which had also been developing mobile apps and had a team of 12 developers.

In July 2014, the company raised $25 million in a Series B round.

In November 2015, the company raised $50 million in a Series C round.

In October 2017, GetYourGuide opened an engineering office in Zurich.

In November 2017, GetYourGuide raised a $75 million Series D funding round to expand in Asia and the Americas. It sold 5 million tickets that year, compared to 5 million sold in all years prior.

In August 2018, GetYourGuide began selling tours under its brand name in partnership with operators that meet certain standards.

In April 2019, GetYourGuide raised $484 million in a Series E round led by SoftBank Vision Fund at a valuation above $1 billion, making it a unicorn. It was one of the largest-ever funding rounds for a European startup. By that time, the company had sold 25 million tickets since inception.

During the COVID-19 pandemic, the company shifted to remote work.

GetYourGuide started selling activities in the United States in 2021. It also began accepting Dogecoin for payment.

In May 2023, the company raised $194 million at a $2 billion valuation.

In April 2025, the company was one of several companies fined by the Italian Competition Authority for profiting from the resale of tickets to the Colosseum and making it harder for tourists to buy tickets at face value.

In October 2025, the company announced that it was profitable for the first time and that it had €1 billion in sales in the past year.
