= Peter Bratt =

Swedish journalist

Peter Bratt (born 29 April 1944) is a Swedish journalist. For many years he worked for the national Swedish newspaper Dagens Nyheter until he quit 2003.

== The IB affair ==
In what was to be known as the IB affair, Peter Bratt revealed Informationsbyrån together with Jan Guillou in the magazine Folket i Bild/Kulturfront. He also published his own book on IB from Gidlunds förlag (publishers) in 1973, IB och hotet mot vår säkerhet (IB and the threat against our security).

== The Geijer affair ==
In November 1977, Peter Bratt published an article in Dagens Nyheter on a memo in which the Police Commissioner had stated that the Minister for Justice Lennart Geijer was a security risk. This led to the Geijer affair, a scandal involving prostitution of children in the fostercare system.

== Works ==
- Kan vi lita på demokratin? intervjuer med Anders Carlberg, Lars Gyllensten, Harald Ofstad, Kurt Samuelsson, 1969
- De förrådda idealen: om svensk socialdemokrati och Sverige inför 70-talet, 1969
- IB och hotet mot vår säkerhet, Gidlunds Förlag, Stockholm, 1973, ISBN 91-7021-063-2
- I fängelse, Gidlunds Förlag, Stockholm, 1974, ISBN 91-7021-088-8
- Steg för steg: om stuveriarbetarnas fackliga kamp, 1974
- Med rent uppsåt. Albert Bonniers Förlag, Stockholm, 16 October 2007. Memoirs. ISBN 978-91-0-011578-4
