= Birgir Finnbogason =

Icelandic handball player (born 1948)

Personal information
- Nationality: Icelandic
- Born: 18 September 1948 (age 78)
- Height: 180 cm (71 in)

Sport
- Sport: Handball
- Position: Goalkeeper
- Current club: Retired
National team
| Years | Team | Apps | (Gls) |
| – | Iceland | 45 | (0) |

Birgir Finnbogason (born 18 September 1948) is an Icelandic former handball player who competed in the 1972 Summer Olympics.
