= Börje Wickberg =

Swedish chemist

- Born: 27 February 1926; Stockholm, Sweden
- Died: 3 March 2013 (aged 87)
- Education: Royal Institute of Technology
- Known for: Organic chemistry; Chemistry of mushrooms
- Scientific career
- Fields: Chemistry
- Workplaces: Lund University
- Doctoral advisor: Holger Erdtman

Börje Wickberg (27 February 1926 – 3 March 2013) was a Swedish chemist.

Wickberg graduated with a PhD in 1960 from the Royal Institute of Technology with a thesis on carbohydrate chemistry and was simultaneously awarded the title as Docent. In 1960–61, he was a research associate at lowa State University, USA, and in 1961–62 at Indiana University, USA. During part of this time, he worked with natural products' chemist Ernest Wenkert. In 1966 he was appointed Professor of organic chemistry at Lund University where he stayed until his retirement in 1991. He was elected to the Royal Physiographic Society in Lund in 1967, and to the Royal Swedish Academy of Sciences in 1984.

== Sources ==
- Sterner, Olov; ”Forskade om svampars kemi”, Sydsvenska Dagbladet Snällposten, Malmö, March 27, 2013 (in swe)
- Vem är det : Svensk biografisk handbok 1969, Sten Lagerström (Ed.), P. A. Norstedt & Söners Förlag, Stockholm 1968. p. 1024
