= Burger =

Burger or Burgers may refer to:

== Foods ==
- Hamburger, a food consisting of one or more cooked meat patties in a bread or bun roll
- Other "burgers":
  - Afghani burger, an Afghan fast food wrap in Afghan bread
  - Cheeseburger, a hamburger with added cheese(s)
  - Chicken burger, a burger with chicken
  - Fish burger, a burger with fish
  - Rice burger, uses compressed rice cakes instead of hamburger buns
  - Veggie burger, a burger made with plant-based meat substitute

== Drinks ==
- Burger (grape), a Californian wine grape
- Gouais blanc, a French wine grape that is also known as Burger
- Elbling, a German wine grape that is also known as Burger

== People ==
- Burger (surname)
- Burgers (surname)
- Bürger, a surname
- Burger (given name)

== Arts and media ==
- Die Burger, a South African newspaper
- "Burger", a song by Tyler, the Creator from the album Goblin
- Burgers (album), 1972, by the American band Hot Tuna
- "Burgers" (The Apprentice), a 2017 television episode
- "Burgers", an upcoming song by SZA

== Other uses ==
- Burger Boat Company, a Wisconsin-based company
- Burger Branch, a stream in Tennessee
- Burger Creek, U.S.
- Burger Point, a cape in Alaska
- R.E. Burger Power Station, a former coal-fired power plant in Ohio

== See also ==
- Berger (disambiguation)
- Birger
- Burgher (disambiguation)
- Cheeseburger (disambiguation)
- Hamburger (disambiguation)
