= Burger (surname) =

Burger is a West Germanic surname. It is the Dutch and Afrikaans word for 'freeman' or 'citizen' (German Bürger, Low German Börger) and the surname is equivalent to the English surname Burgess. In Dutch and German speaking countries it may be a toponymic surname, indicating origin from any of a number of towns ending in -burg. Notable people with the surname include:

== Academics ==
- Artur Burger (1943–2000), Austrian pharmacist and pharmacognosist
- Barbara Burger, American chemist
- Boštjan Burger (born 1966), Slovenian informatician, geographer, and panoramic photographer
- Dionys Burger (1892–1987), Dutch physicist and science fiction author
- Edward Burger (born 1964), American mathematician and university president
- Fritz Burger (1877–1916), German art historian
- Harald Burger (born 1940), German linguist
- Heinrich Bürger (Burger) (1806–1858), German/Dutch chemist and botanist
- Herman Carel Burger (1893–1965), Dutch biophysicist
- Joachim Burger (born 1969), German anthropologist and molecular biologist
- Johann Burger (1773–1842), Austrian agronomist
- Richard L. Burger (born 1950), American archaeologist and anthropologist
- Ronna Burger (born 1947), American philosopher
- Rudolf Burger (1938–2021), Austrian philosopher
- William Carl Burger (born 1932), American botanist

== Arts and writers ==
- Alex Burger (born 1972), American playwright and screenwriter
- Anthony Burger (1961–2006), American gospel pianist and singer
- Anton Burger (1824–1905), German painter
- Carl Burger (1888–1967), American writer and illustrator
- Claire Burger, French film director, film editor and screenwriter
- Dai Burger, American rapper
- Eugene Burger (1939–2017), American magician
- Fritz Burger-Mühlfeld (1882–1969), German painter and graphic designer
- Gary Burger (1942–2014), American rock musician
- Germain Burger (1900–1985), British cinematographer and film director
- Hanuš Burger (1909–1990), Czech film director
- Hermann Burger (1942–1989), Swiss poet, novelist and essayist
- Janez Burger (born 1965), Slovene film director, screenwriter and producer.
- Johann Burger (1829–1912), Swiss engraver
- Jörg Burger (born 1962), German music producer
- Ludwig Burger (1825–1884), German historical painter and illustrator
- Markus Burger (born 1966), German pianist, composer and music educator
- Neil Burger, American film director
- Rob Burger, American accordionist, keyboardist and music director
- Werner Carl Burger (1925 - 2023), German painter
- Wilhelm J. Burger (1844–1920), Austrian photographer and painter
- Willi Burger (born 1934), Italian harmonica player

== Politics and law ==
- Albert Burger (1925–1981), German politician
- Anna Burger (born 1950), American union leader
- Friedrich Moritz Burger (1804–1873), Austrian jurist and politician
- Jaap Burger (1904–1986), Dutch politician and government minister
- James C. Burger (1866–1937), American politician
- John Burger (1916–2005), American politician, businessman, and lawyer
- Karen Arnold-Burger (born 1957), American Chief Judge of the Kansas Court of Appeals
- Sarah Burger Stearns (1836–1904), American social reformer and suffragist
- Schalk Willem Burger (1852–1918), South African military leader and acting President
- Warren E. Burger (1907–1995), 15th Chief Justice of the United States

== Sports ==
- Albert Burger (1955–2023), German alpine skier
- Anina Burger (born 1967), South African cricketer
- Bernie Burger (born 1981), Namibian cricketer
- Chere Burger (born 1982), South African dressage rider
- Christopher Burger (1935–2014), South African cricketer
- Chuck Burger (1936–2021), American bridge player
- Cindy Burger (footballer) (born 1980), Dutch footballer
- Cindy Burger (tennis), Dutch tennis player
- Danie Burger (1933–1990), South African hurdler
- Dietmar Burger (born 1968), Austrian darts player
- Erin Burger (born 1980), South African netball player
- Fritzi Burger (1910–1999), Austrian figure skater'
- Guillaume Burger (born 1989), French sprint canoer
- Heinrich Burger (1881–1942), German figure skater
- Hubert Burger, Italian luger
- Jacques Burger (born 1983), Namibian rugby player
- Jake Burger (born 1996), American baseball player
- Jan-Berrie Burger (born 1981), Namibian cricketer
- Jiří Burger (born 1977), Czech ice hockey player
- Kai Burger (born 1992), German football forward
- Karl Burger (1883–1959), German soccer player and coach
- Louis Burger (born 1978), Namibian cricketer
- Lynette Burger (born 1980), South African cyclist
- Martin Burger (born 1939), Austrian alpine sk
- Nandre Burger (born 1995), South African cricketer
- Nina Burger (born 1987), Austrian footballer
- Paul Burger (1874–1940), Belgian road racing cyclist
- Peter Burger (born 1954), Swiss modern pentathlete
- Philip Burger (born 1980), South African rugby player
- Rumé Burger (born 2008), South African sprinter
- Sándor Burger (1899–1978), Hungarian sailor
- Sarel Burger (born 1983), Namibian cricketer
- Schalk Burger (born 1956) a.k.a. Burger Geldenhuys, South African rugby player
- Schalk Burger (born 1983), South African rugby player
- Tienie Burger (born 1993), South African rugby player
- Todd Burger (born 1970), American football player
- Thys Burger (born 1954), South African rugby player
- Vreny Burger (born 1955), Swiss archer
- Werner Burger (born 1958), German football coach

== Other ==
- Adolf Burger (1917–2016), Slovak Holocaust survivor involved in Operation Bernhard
- Alewyn Burger (born 1951), South African banker
- Anton Burger (1911–1991), Austrian-German Nazi SS concentration camp commandant
- Bas Burger (born 1970), Dutch business executive
- Cornelius Burger, South African serial killer
- Eberhard Burger (born 1943), German civil engineer
- Ernest Peter Burger (1906–1975), German saboteur during World War II
- Hélène Burger (1900–1987), French Red Cross nurse during World War II
- Ida Burger, U.S. dance hall girl and prostitute
- Jean Burger (1907–1945), French communist and World War II resistance member
- Johan Burger, South African businessman
- Joseph Burger (1848–1921), Swiss German soldier who fought in the American Civil War
- Joseph C. Burger (1902–1982), United States Marine Corps officer and college athlete
- Knox Burger (1922–2010), American editor, writer, and literary agent
- Malcolm Burger, British World War I flying ace
- Michael Burger (born 1957), American television host
- Nelle G. Burger (1869–1957), American temperance leader
- Reinhold Burger (1866–1954), German glass blower and inventor
- Stephan Burger (born 1962), German Catholic archbishop
- Tutilo Burger (born 1965), German Benedictine monk and abbot
- Wilhelm Burger (1904–1979), German SS-Sturmbannführer
- Jake Lee Santos-Burger (1910-1967), American Sub-par Carpenter

== Fictional people ==
- Hamilton Burger, district attorney in the Perry Mason novels, films, and programs

== See also ==
- Berger
- Bürger
- Burgers (surname)
- Burgher
