= Berger =

Berger is a surname in both German and French, although there is no etymological connection between the names in the two languages. The French surname is an occupational name for a shepherd, from Old French bergier (Late Latin berbicarius, from berbex 'ram'). The German surname derives from the word Berg, the word for "mountain" or "hill", and means "a resident on a mountain or hill", or someone from a toponym Berg, derived from the same. The pronunciation of the English name may sometimes be /ˈbɜːrdʒər/ BUR-jər, following the French phonetics [bɛʁʒe]; the German one is [ˈbɛʁɡɐ], anglicized as /ˈbɜːrɡər/ BUR-gər. Notable people with this surname include:

== Politics ==
- Charles W. Berger (1936–2016), American politician
- Gianna Berger (born 1999), Swiss politician
- James S. Berger (1903–1984), American politician
- Jan Johannis Adriaan Berger (1918–1978), Dutch politician
- Józef Berger (1901–1962), Polish theologian and politician
- Karine Berger (born 1973), French politician
- Laurent Berger (born 1968), French trade unionist
- Lieselotte Berger (1920–1989), German politician
- Luciana Berger (born 1981), British Liberal Democrat politician
- Maria Berger (born 1956), Austrian politician
- Markus Berger (1913–1988), German politician
- Mateusz Berger (born 1986), Polish politician
- Matthias Berger (born 1968), German politician
- Melanie Berger (born 1982), German politician
- Mónica Nágel Berger (born 1960), Costa Rican politician and lawyer
- Óscar Berger (born 1946), President of Guatemala
- Ossian Berger (1849–1914), Swedish politician and lawyer
- Phil Berger (born 1952), American politician
- Samuel D. Berger (1911–1980), American diplomat
- Sandy Berger (1945–2015), American attorney and politician
- Thomas R. Berger (1933–2021), Canadian politician
- Tina Berger (born 1981), Austrian politician
- Ulrich Berger (1921–2003), German politician
- Victor L. Berger (1860–1929), American politician

== Sports ==
- Alfred Berger (1894–1966), Austrian pair skater
- Andrea Berger (born 1970), American tennis player
- Andreas Berger (athlete) (born 1961), Austrian sprinter
- Ann-Katrin Berger (born 1990), German football goalkeeper
- Barbara Berger (1930–2016), American baseball player
- Chris Berger (1911–1965), Dutch sprinter
- Daniel Berger (born 1993), American golfer
- David Mark Berger (1944–1972), Israeli weightlifter; one of 11 hostages murdered in the Munich massacre
- Frederick Berger (1849–?), American baseball umpire
- Gerhard Berger (born 1959), Austrian racing driver
- Grace Berger (born 1999), American basketball player
- Guylaine Berger (born 1956), French swimmer
- Han Berger (born 1950), Dutch football coach
- Ike Berger (1936–2022), American weightlifter
- Ilana Berger (born 1965), Israeli tennis player
- Jalen Berger (born 2001), American football player
- Jan Berger (born 1976), Czech-Swiss football player
- Jay Berger (born 1966), American tennis player
- Johann Berger (1845–1933), Austrian chess master, theorist, endgame study composer, author and editor
- Lars Berger (born 1979), Norwegian biathlete
- Mark Berger (born 1954), Canadian judoka
- Maxie Berger (1917–2000), Canadian boxer
- Norma Berger (1932–2023), American baseball player, sister of Barbara
- Ola Berger (born 1979), Norwegian ski mountaineer and cross-country skier
- Olia Berger (born 1983), Canadian judoka
- Patrik Berger (born 1973), Czech football player
- Ruud Berger (born 1980), Dutch football player
- Sam Berger (1900–1992), Canadian football team owner
- Samuel Berger (1884–1925), American boxer
- Ségolène Berger (born 1978), French tennis player
- Steve Berger (born 1973), American mixed martial artist
- Tora Berger (born 1981), Norwegian biathlete, sister of Lars
- Tore Berger (1944–2026), Norwegian sprint canoeist
- Wally Berger (1905–1988), American baseball player

== Music ==
- Arthur Berger (1912–2003), American composer
- Bengt Berger (1942–2026), Swedish jazz drummer, composer, and producer
- Christian Wilhelm Berger (born 1964), Romanian composer and musician
- Dominique II Berger (1780–1845), Flemish organist and carillonneur
- Erna Berger (1900–1990), German soprano singer
- Henri Berger (1844–1929), Hawaiian musician
- Karl Berger (1935–2023), German jazz musician and educator
- Ludwig Berger (composer) (1777–1839), German composer and piano teacher
- Margaret Berger (born 1985), Norwegian singer, songwriter, and disc jockey
- Michel Berger (1947–1992), French singer and songwriter
- Wilhelm Berger (1861–1911), German composer
- Wilhelm Georg Berger (1929–1993), Romanian composer
- Wilhelm Peterson Berger (1867–1942), Swedish musician

== Culture ==
- Alex Berger, (born 1962), American producer, creator, consultant and entrepreneur
- Charlotta Berger (1784–1852), Swedish poet and novelist
- Edward Berger (born 1970), Austrian-Swiss director
- Élie Berger (1850–1925), French archivist and palaeographer
- Erika Berger (1939–2016), German television presenter and writer
- Georgette Berger (1901–1986), Belgian wife of the painter René Magritte
- Helmut Berger (1944–2023), Austrian actor
- Howard Berger (born 1964), American makeup artist
- John Berger (1926–2017), British art critic, novelist, painter, and author
- Jonah Berger (born c. 1981), American writer and professor
- Karen Berger (born 1958), American comic book editor
- Katya Berger (born 1966) (sometimes credited as Katia Berger or Katja Berger), British actress
- Marco Berger (born 1977), Argentine film director and screenwriter
- Maurice Berger (1956–2020) American cultural historian, curator, and critic
- Nicole Berger (born Nicole Gouspeyre, 1934–1967), French actress
- Nicole Berger (American actress) (born 2003), American actress, model, and pianist
- Oscar Berger (cartoonist) (1901–1997), Slovak cartoonist
- Pablo Berger (born 1963), Spanish film director
- Petra Berger (born Petra Pierrette Burger, 1965), Dutch singer, composer, photographer, and actress
- Robert Berger (producer) (born 1934), American film producer
- Senta Berger (born 1941), Austrian actress
- Thomas Berger (novelist) (1924–2014), American novelist
- Wiesław Adam Berger (1926–1998), Polish writer
- William Berger (actor)(1928–1993), Austrian-American actor
- Yves Berger (1931–2004), French writer and editor

== Academics ==
- Alwin Berger (1871–1931), German botanist
- André Berger (born 1942), Belgian climatologist
- Beverly Berger, American physicist
- Hans Berger (1873–1941), German neuroscientist
- Harriet Berger (died 2012), American political scientist
- Helen A. Berger (born 1949), American sociologist
- James Berger (statistician) (born 1950), American statistician
- Jeffrey W. Berger (1963–2001), American physician and engineer
- Jerry Berger (1933–2021), American journalist
- Johann Gottfried von Berger (1659–1736), German physician
- Josef Berger (scientist) (born 1949), Czech biomedical engineer and haematologist
- Lee R. Berger (born 1965), American-born South African explorer and paleoanthropologist
- Leszek Berger (1925–2012), Polish herpetologist and malacologist
- Marcel Berger (1927–2016), French mathematician
- Paul R. Berger (born 1963), American engineer
- Peter B. Berger (born 1956), American cardiologist
- Peter L. Berger (1929–2017), Austrian-born American sociologist and theologian
- Richard Berger (1894–1984), Swiss professor of design, decoration, and art history
- Robert Berger (mathematician) (born 1938), American mathematician
- Wolfgang H. Berger (1937–2017), German-American oceanographer

== Other professions ==
- Carolyn Berger, American judge
- Daniel Berger (engraver) (1744–1825), German engraver
- David Berger (theologian) (born 1968), German theologian
- Gaston Berger (1896–1960), French futurist, industrialist, philosopher and state manager
- Georges Berger (1918–1967), Belgian racing driver
- Gottlob Berger (1896–1975), German Schutzstaffel (SS) general
- Irene Berger (born 1954), American judge
- Mélanie Berger-Volle (born 1921), Austrian-born French veteran
- Josef Berger (speechwriter) (1903–1981), American journalist, accused of being a Soviet spy
- Patricia Wilson Berger (1926–2011), American librarian
- Roland Berger (born 1937), German entrepreneur and philanthropist
- Roza Berger (1889–1945), 1945 Kraków pogrom victim
- Theo Berger (1941–2003), German criminal

== Fictional ==
- Erika Berger from the Millennium trilogy by Stieg Larsson

== See also ==
- Birger
- Bürger
- Burger (disambiguation)
- Burger (surname)
- Burgers (surname)
- Burgher (disambiguation)
- Litzenberger (surname)
