= Bürger =

Bürger or Buerger is a surname. Notable people with the name include:

- Albert Burger (disambiguation), several people
- Annekathrin Bürger (born 1937), German stage, film and television actress
- Björn Bürger (born 1985), German opera singer
- Erna Bürger (1909–1958), German gymnast
- Gottfried August Bürger (1747–1794), German poet
- Hans-Georg Bürger (1952–1980), German racing driver
- Henry Burger (disambiguation), several people
- Henning Bürger (born 1969), German footballer
- Jan Bürger (born 2007), German footballer
- John Burger (1916–2005), American politician, businessman and lawyer
- Joseph Buerger (1870–1951), American rower
- Julius Bürger (1897–1995), Austrian-American composer, pianist and conductor
- Karl Bürger (1866–1936), German classical scholar
- Karl-Heinz Bürger (1904–1988), German SS-Oberführer
- Kurt Bürger (1894–1951), German politician
- Leo Buerger (1879–1943), American biologist
- Leon Bürger (born 1999), German footballer
- Martin Julian Buerger (1903–1986), American scientist
- Patrick Bürger (born 1987), Austrian footballer
- Roland Bürger or Bürgermeista (born 1972), German guitarist and songwriter
- Rudolf Bürger (1908–1980), Romanian footballer
- Ursula Bürger, German bicycle racer
- Victor Buerger (1904–c. 1996), Ukrainian-British chess player
- Warren E. Burger (1907–1995), American attorney
- Wenzel Bürger (1869–1946), Chemnitz architect
- Hans Bürger (1920-1980), German scientist

== See also ==
- Burger (surname)
- Burgher (disambiguation) § People with the surname
- Burgers (surname)
- Birger, given name and surname
- Berger, surname
