= H. bergeri =

H. bergeri may refer to:

- Homopus bergeri, the Berger's cape tortoise, a turtle species endemic to Namibia
- Hyalinobatrachium bergeri, a frog species found in Bolivia and Peru

== See also ==
- Bergeri (disambiguation)
