= Caoba =

Caoba may refer to:

- Burger, a wine grape
- Caoba Township (草坝乡, lit. "Grass Dam Village") in Li County, Gansu, in China.
- Mahogany wood
