= Jeffrey Berger =

Jeffrey Berger may refer to:

- Jeffrey J. Berger (born 1955), American Democratic politician in the state of Connecticut
- Jeffrey W. Berger (1963–2001), American vitreoretinal surgeon and engineer
- Geoffrey Berger of Piper Aircraft
