= Alex Burger =

Alex Burger can refer to:

- Alex Burger (musician), a Canadian country singer-songwriter
- Alex Burger (sailor), a South African sailor
- Alex Burger (screenwriter), n American playwright and screenwriter
