= Peter Berger =

Peter Berger may refer to:

- Peter Berger (rower) (born 1949), German Olympic rower
- Peter Berger (Royal Navy officer) (1925–2003), British admiral
- Peter B. Berger (born 1956), American cardiologist and researcher
- Peter E. Berger (1944–2011), American film editor
- Peter L. Berger (1929–2017), Austrian-born American sociologist and Lutheran theologian

== See also ==
- Peter Berg (born 1964), American film director
- Peter Bergen (born 1962), American journalist
- Peter Burger (born 1954), Swiss pentathlete
