= Coherence theory =

Coherence theory may refer to

- Coherence theory (optics), the study of optical effects arising from partially coherent electromagnetic radiation
- Coherence theory of truth, regards truth as coherence within some specified set of sentences, propositions or beliefs
- Weak central coherence theory, posits that persons on the autism spectrum have only limited ability to understand context, to "see the big picture"

== See also ==
- Coherentism, two approaches to philosophical epistemology
