= Jan Berger =

Jan Berger may refer to:

- Jan Berger (footballer, born 1955), Czechoslovak association football player
- Jan Berger (footballer, born 1976), Czech-Swiss association football player
- Jan Berger (screenwriter) (born 1970), German screenwriter
- Jan Johannis Adriaan Berger (1918–1978), Dutch politician
