= Johanna Geertruida van Cittert-Eymers =

Dutch physicist (1903–1988)

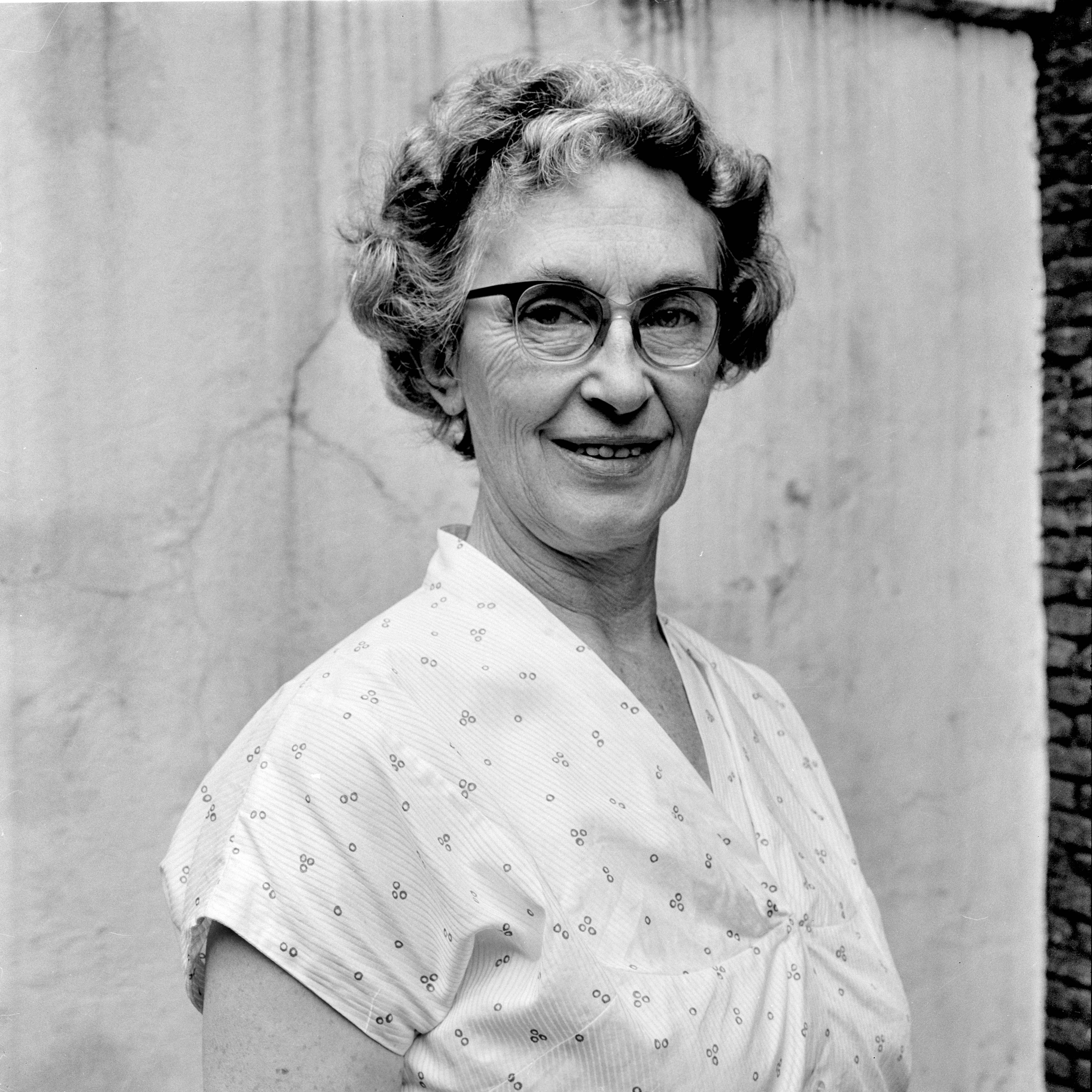
- Van Cittert-Eymers in 1963
- Born: Johanna Geertruida Eymers; 19 June 1903; Velp, Netherlands
- Died: 22 October 1988 (aged 85); Utrecht, Netherlands
- Other name: Truus van Cittert-Eymers
- Education: Utrecht University
- Spouse: Pieter Hendrik van Cittert
- Scientific career
- Fields: Physics; History of Science
- Thesis: Fundamental principles for the illumination of a picture gallery (1935)
- Doctoral advisor: Leonard Ornstein

Johanna Geertruida (Truus) van Cittert-Eymers (née Eymers, 1903–1988) was a Dutch physicist, historian of science, museum director and author.

== Early years ==
Johanna Geertruida Eymers was born in Velp, in the Netherlands on 19 June 1903, the only child of teacher Johan Anton Eymers and Johanna Hermina Aleida Huetinck. She graduated from secondary school with a HBS-b diploma in Arnhem in 1921 and moved to Utrecht to begin studying physics at the university there in 1923.

== Career ==
Eymers began work as a researcher in the experimental physics group of Leonard Ornstein at Utrecht University in 1929 and in 1932 became the head of the teaching laboratory. Ornstein's group did both pure and applied research, with the latter often at the request of businesses or government institutions. Thus it came to be that Eymers published research about atomic emission spectra but her doctoral research concerned the illumination of an art gallery in The Hague. Eymers graduated cum laude with a PhD in 1935 and did postdoctoral research in biophysics, specifically on luminescent bacteria.

After her marriage to Pieter Hendrik van Cittert in 1938, Van Cittert-Eymers's employment was terminated because of the marriage bar which was effective in the Netherlands until 1957. She resented her loss of employment and worked unpaid to assist her husband in his work as curator of the University Museum.

== Personal life ==
Eymers married her colleague, the physicist Pieter Hendrik van Cittert in 1938. The couple had a son, Benjamin, in 1939 who died in infancy and a daughter, Han, in 1943 who became a biologist.
