= Bergeri =

Bergeri may refer to:

- Homopus bergeri, the Berger's cape tortoise, a species of turtle endemic to Namibia
- Hyalinobatrachium bergeri, a species of frog found in Bolivia and Peru
- Italian pool frog (Pelophylax bergeri), a species of frog found in France and Italy
- Tillandsia bergeri, a species of the genus Tillandsia native to Brazil

== See also ==
- Berger (disambiguation)
