= Pieter Hendrik van Cittert =

Dutch physicist and science historian (1889–1959)

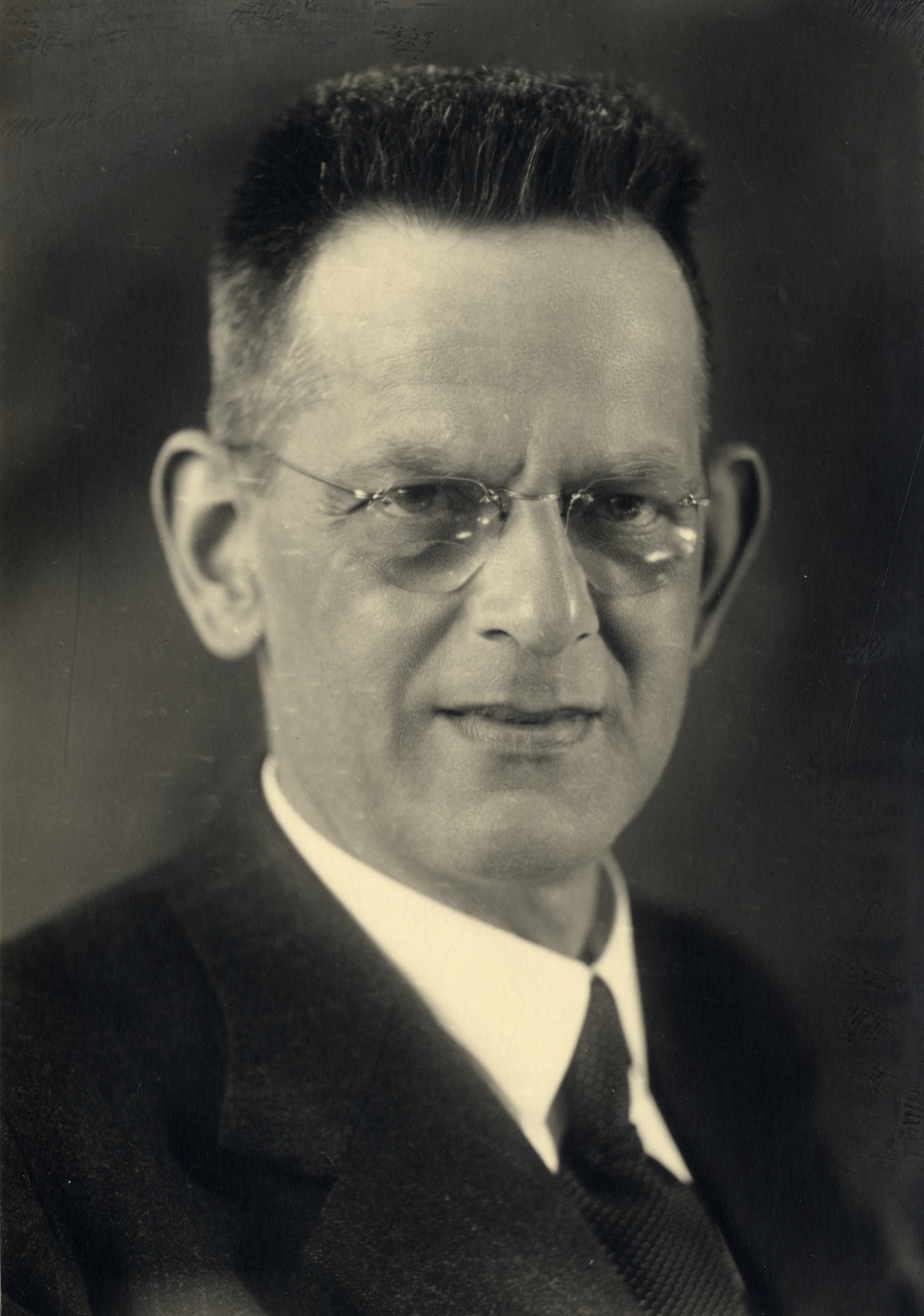
Portrait of van Cittert, 1925-35

Pieter Hendrik van Cittert (30 May 1889 – 8 October 1959) was a Dutch physicist and science historian. He is known for proving the van Cittert–Zernike theorem about the coherence of electromagnetic radiation in 1934. He also founded the University Museum in Utrecht.

== Life ==
=== Early life ===
Pieter Hendrik van Cittert was born in 1889 in Gouda, Netherlands, to Benjamin Pieter van Cittert and Petronella Antonia Huber.

=== Career ===
In 1912, van Cittert joined the Physics Laboratory at the University of Utrecht. In 1918, he discovered thousands of historical scientific instruments from the eighteenth-century Physics Society in Utrecht. This collection was the starting point for the University Museum, which Hendrik van Cittert founded in 1928. He was promoted in 1919.

In 1921, van Cittert and Leonard Ornstein were among the founders of the Dutch Physical Society (NNV). Hendrik van Cittert was a part-time teacher of physics at HOBS in Utrecht (1916–1950). He founded the Physics Laboratory in Utrecht (1922–1950) and became the first director of the University Museum of Utrecht (1951–1955).

== Personal life ==
Van Cittert married his colleague, the physicist Johanna Geertruida van Cittert-Eymers in 1938.

He died on 8 October 1959 in Utrecht.
