= Kate Zernike =

American journalist (born 1968)

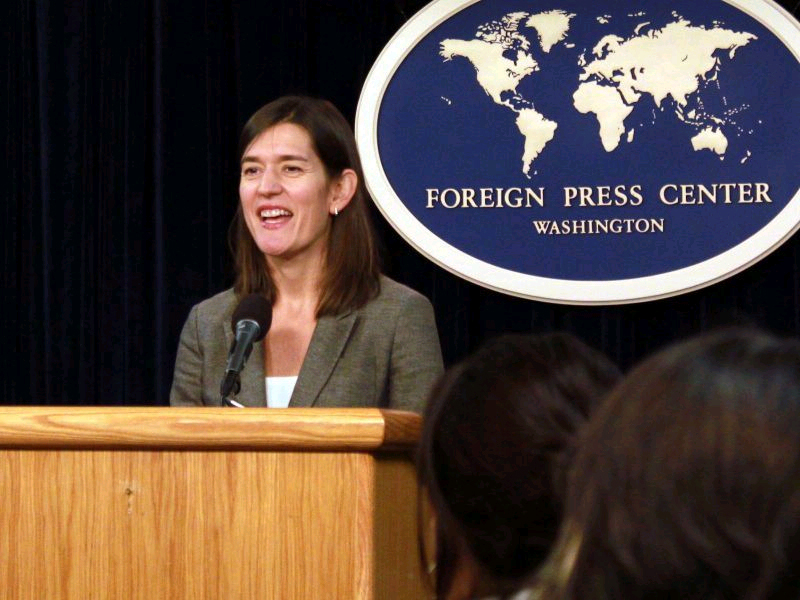
Zernike in 2010

Kate Zernike (born December 8, 1968) is an American journalist who is national correspondent for The New York Times, where she has been since April 2000, covering education, criminal justice, Congress, and national elections, and where she covered Hurricane Katrina. She was previously a reporter at The Boston Globe (1995–2000), where she was responsible for covering education and special projects. She is the author of Boiling Mad: Inside Tea Party America (2010), on the Tea Party movement. Marjorie Kehe of The Christian Science Monitor remarked in 2010 that it was likely that "no other journalist in the United States has devoted as much time to covering the tea party movement".

== Early life and education ==
Zernike was born in Stamford, Connecticut, the daughter of Barbara (née Backus) and Frits Zernike Jr. Her father was a physicist who emigrated from Groningen, the Netherlands in 1956; and her mother owned the St. Clair Ice Cream Company in South Norwalk, Connecticut. Her paternal grandfather, Frits Zernike, was a Dutch physicist who received the Nobel Prize in Physics in 1953. She has two brothers, Frits Zernike III and Harry Zernike.

Zernike is a graduate of Trinity College at University of Toronto, where she obtained her B.A. in history and English in 1990. She later graduated from the Columbia University Graduate School of Journalism, receiving a master's in journalism in 1992.

== Career ==
Zernike began her career in journalism at The Patriot Ledger in Quincy, Massachusetts, where she worked from 1992 to 1995. She then worked as a reporter at The Boston Globe from 1995 to 2000, where she was responsible for covering education and special projects. In 1999, she broke the story of MIT's public acknowledgment of gender discrimination against women faculty in its School of Science. She later returned to the episode and the scientists behind it in her 2023 book The Exceptions.

Zernike became a national correspondent for The New York Times in April 2000, where she covers education, criminal justice, Congress, and national elections.

She has also taught as an adjunct professor at the Columbia University Graduate School of Journalism.

== Honors and awards ==
Zernike was a member of the New York Times team which shared the 2002 Pulitzer Prize for Explanatory Reporting, which was for reporting on global terrorism and its networks.

She also won the Education Writers Association prize for news feature reporting in 2000, and the Benjamin Fine Award in 1995.

== Works ==
- Boiling Mad: Inside Tea Party America, New York:Times Books (ISBN 9780805093483
- The Exceptions: Sixteen Women, MIT, and the Fight for Equality in Science. Simon & Schuster. April 27, 2023. ISBN 978-1-3985-2000-4.

== Personal ==
In 2005, she married Dr. Jonathan D. Schwartz in a ceremony presided over by a leader from the New York Society for Ethical Culture. Zernike lives in Montclair, NJ with her family. She has two sons with her husband.
