= Henry Burger =

Henry Burger or Berger may refer to:

- Heinrich Bürger (1804–1858), German scientist
- Henry Berger (1826–1864), American organ builder
- Henry B. Burger (fl. 1863), American founder of the Burger Boat Company
- Henri Berger (1844–1929), Prussian-Hawaiian composer and bandmaster
- Henry Burger (died 1936), Swiss-Canadian restaurateur and founder of Café Henry Burger
- Heinrich Otto Wilhelm Bürger (1865–1945), German zoologist
- Heinrich Burger (1881–1942), German figure skater
- Hank Berger (1952–2006), American nightclub owner

== See also ==
- Henry's Hamburgers, a former United States fast-food chain
