= Van Cittert–Zernike theorem =

Formula used in radio astronomy

The van Cittert–Zernike theorem, named after physicists Pieter Hendrik van Cittert and Frits Zernike, is a formula in coherence theory that states that under certain conditions the Fourier transform of the intensity distribution function of a distant, incoherent source is equal to its complex visibility. This implies that the wavefront from an incoherent source will appear mostly coherent at large distances. Intuitively, this can be understood by considering the wavefronts created by two incoherent sources. If we measure the wavefront immediately in front of one of the sources, our measurement will be dominated by the nearby source. If we make the same measurement far from the sources, our measurement will no longer be dominated by a single source; both sources will contribute almost equally to the wavefront at large distances.

A spatially incoherent source appears to be (spatially) coherent if seen from far away. In the visualization the three sources (black dots) are incoherent with each other, the grey lines are the zeros of the field from each source (at a fixed time), and the black line the zero of the total field.

This reasoning can be easily visualized by dropping two stones in the center of a calm pond. Near the center of the pond, the disturbance created by the two stones will be very complicated. As the disturbance propagates towards the edge of the pond, however, the waves will smooth out and will appear to be nearly circular.

The van Cittert–Zernike theorem has important implications for radio astronomy. With the exception of pulsars and masers, all astronomical sources are spatially incoherent. Nevertheless, because they are observed at distances large enough to satisfy the van Cittert–Zernike theorem, these objects exhibit a non-zero degree of coherence at different points in the imaging plane. By measuring the degree of coherence at different points in the imaging plane (the so-called "visibility function") of an astronomical object, a radio astronomer can thereby reconstruct the source's brightness distribution and make a two-dimensional map of the source's appearance.

== Statement of the theorem ==
Consider two very distant parallel planes, both perpendicular to the line of sight, and let's call them source plane and observation plane; If $\Gamma_{12}(u,v,0)$ is the mutual coherence function between two points in the observation plane, then

$$\Gamma_{12} (u,v,0) = \iint I(l,m) e^{-2\pi i(ul+vm)} \, dl \, dm$$

where $l$ and $m$ are the direction cosines of a point on a distant source in the source plane, $u$ and $v$ are respectively the x-distance and the y-distance between the two observation points on the observation plane in unit of wavelength and $I$ is the intensity of the source. This theorem was first derived by Pieter Hendrik van Cittert in 1934 with a simpler proof provided by Frits Zernike in 1938.

This theorem will remain confusing to some engineers or scientists because of its statistical nature and difference from simple correlation or even covariance processing methods. A good reference (which still might not clarify the issue for some users, but does have a great sketch to drive the method home) is Goodman, starting on page 207.

== The mutual coherence function ==
The mutual coherence function for some electric field $E(t)$ measured at two points in a plane of observation (call them 1 and 2), is defined to be

$$\Gamma_{12} (\tau) = \lim_{T \to \infty} \frac{1}{2T} \int_{-T}^T E_1(t) E_2^*(t-\tau) dt$$

where $\tau$ is the time offset between the measurement of $E(t)$ at observation points 1 and 2. The mutual coherence of the field at two points may be thought of as the time-averaged cross-correlation between the electric fields at the two points separated in time by $\tau$. Thus, if we are observing two fully incoherent sources we should expect the mutual coherence function to be relatively small between the two random points in the observation plane, because the sources will interfere destructively as well as constructively. Far away from the sources, however, we should expect the mutual coherence function to be relatively large because the sum of the observed fields will be almost the same at any two points.

Normalization of the mutual coherence function to the product of the square roots of the intensities of the two electric fields yields the complex degree of (second-order) coherence (correlation coefficient function):

$$\gamma_{12} (\tau) = \frac{\Gamma_{12}(\tau)}{\sqrt{I_1} \sqrt{I_2}}$$

== Proof of the theorem ==
Let $XY$ and $xy$ be respectively the cartesian coordinates of the source plane and the observation plane. Suppose the electric field due to some point from the source in the source plane is measured at two points, $P_1$ and $P_2$, in the observation plane. The position of a point in the source may be referred to by its direction cosines $(l, m)$. (Since the source is distant, its direction should be the same at $P_1$ as at $P_2$.) The electric field measured at $P_1$ can then be written using phasors:

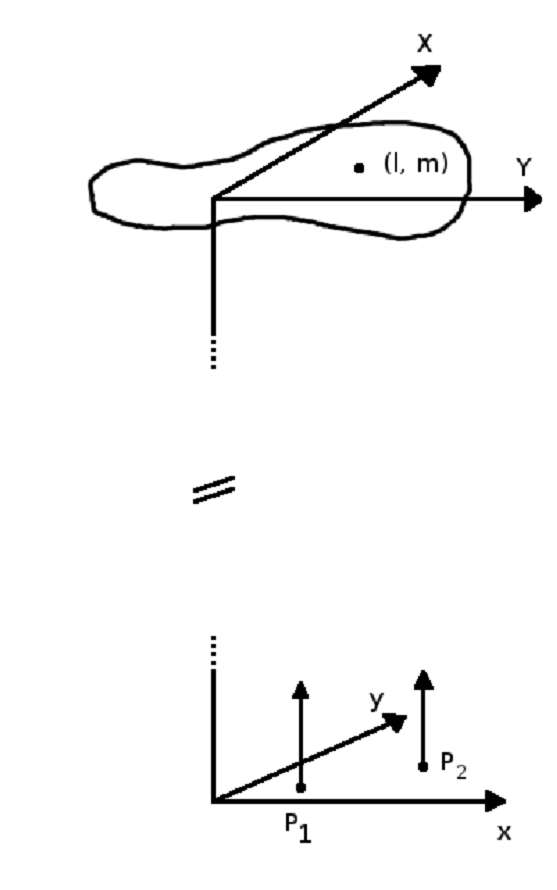
The source is in the XY-plane, shown at the top of the figure, and the detector is in the xy-plane, shown at the bottom of the figure. Consider the electric field at two points, $P_1$ and $P_2$, in the detection plane due to some point in the source whose coordinates are given by the direction cosines $l$ and $m$

$$E_1(l, m, t) = A \left( l, m, t - \frac{R_1}{c} \right) \frac{e^{-i \omega \left( t - \frac{R_1}{c} \right) }}{R_1}$$

where $R_1$ is the distance from the source to $P_1$, $\omega$ is the angular frequency of the light, and $A$ is the complex amplitude of the electric field. Similarly, the electric field measured at $P_2$ can be written as

$$E_2(l, m, t) = A \left( l, m, t - \frac{R_2}{c} \right) \frac{ e^{-i \omega \left( t - \frac{R_2}{c} \right) }}{R_2}$$

Let us now calculate the time-averaged cross-correlation between the electric field at $P_1$ and $P_2$:

$$\big \langle E_1(l, m, t) E_2^*(l, m, t) \big \rangle = \Bigg \langle A \left( l, m, t - \frac{R_1}{c} \right) A^* \left( l, m, t - \frac{R_2}{c} \right) \Bigg \rangle \times \frac{e^{i \omega \frac{R_1}{c} }}{R_1} \times \frac{e^{-i \omega \frac{R_2}{c} }}{R_2}$$

Because the quantity in the angle brackets is time-averaged an arbitrary offset to the temporal term of the amplitudes may be added as long as the same offset is added to both. Let us now add $\frac{R_1}{c}$ to the temporal term of both amplitudes. The time-averaged cross-correlation of the electric field at the two points therefore simplifies to

$$\big \langle E_1(l, m, t) E_2^*(l, m, t) \big \rangle = \Bigg \langle A (l, m, t) A^* \left( l, m, t - \frac{R_2 - R_1}{c} \right) \Bigg \rangle \times \frac{ e^{i \omega \left( \frac{R_1 - R_2}{c} \right)}}{R_1 R_2}$$

But if the source is in the far field then the difference between $R_1$ and $R_2$ will be small compared to the distance light travels in time $t$. ($t$ is on the same order as the inverse bandwidth.) This small correction can therefore be neglected, further simplifying our expression for the cross-correlation of the electric field at $P_1$ and $P_2$ to

$$\langle E_1(l, m, t) E_2^*(l, m, t) \rangle = \langle A(l, m, t) A^*(l, m, t) \rangle \times \frac{e^{i \omega \left( \frac{R_1 - R_2}{c} \right)}}{R_1 R_2}$$

Now, $\langle A(l, m, t) A^*(l, m, t) \rangle$ is simply the intensity of the source at a particular point, $I(l, m)$. So our expression for the cross-correlation simplifies further to

$$\langle E_1(l, m, t) E_2^*(l, m, t) \rangle = I(l, m) \frac{e^{i \omega \left( \frac{R_1 - R_2}{c} \right) }}{R_1 R_2}$$

To calculate the mutual coherence function from this expression, simply integrate over the entire source.

$$\Gamma_{12} (u, v, 0) = \iint_{\textrm{source}} I(l, m) \frac{e^{i \omega \left( \frac{R_1 - R_2}{c} \right) }}{R_1 R_2} \, dS$$

Note that cross terms of the form $\langle A_1 (l, m, t) A_2^* (l, m, t) \rangle$ are not included due to the assumption that the source is incoherent. The time-averaged correlation between two different points from the source will therefore be zero.

Next rewrite the $R_2 - R_1$ term using $u, v, l$ and $m$. To do this, let $P_1 = (x_1, y_1)$ and $P_2 = (x_2, y_2)$. This gives

$$R_1 = \sqrt{R^2 + x_1^2 + y_1^2} \,$$

$$R_2 = \sqrt{R^2 + x_2^2 + y_2^2} \,$$

where $R$ is the distance between the center of the plane of observation and the center of the source. The difference between $R_1$ and $R_2$ thus becomes

$$R_2 - R_1 = R \sqrt{1 + \frac{x_2^2}{R^2} + \frac{y_2^2}{R^2}} - R \sqrt{1 + \frac{x_1^2}{R^2} + \frac{y_1^2}{R^2}}$$

But because $x_1, x_2, y_1$ and $y_2$ are all much less than $R$, the square roots may be Taylor expanded, yielding, to first order,

$$R_2 - R_1 = R \left( 1 + \frac{1}{2} \left( \frac{x_2^2 + y_2^2}{R^2} \right) \right) - R \left( 1 + \frac{1}{2} \left( \frac{x_1^2 + y_1^2}{R^2} \right) \right)$$

which, after some algebraic manipulation, simplifies to

$$R_2 - R_1 = \frac{1}{2R} \left( (x_2 - x_1)(x_2 + x_1) + (y_2 - y_1)(y_2 + y_1) \right)$$

Now, $\frac{1}{2}(x_2 + x_1)$ is the midpoint along the $x$-axis between $P_1$ and $P_2$, so $\frac{1}{2R}(x_2 + x_1)$ gives us $l$, one of the direction cosines to the sources. Similarly, $m = \frac{1}{2R}(y_2 + y_1)$. Moreover, recall that $u$ was defined to be the number of wavelengths along the $x$-axis between $P_1$ and $P_2$. So

$$u = \frac{\omega}{2 \pi c} (x_1 - x_2)$$

Similarly, $v$ is the number of wavelengths between $P_1$ and $P_2$ along the $y$-axis, so

$$v = \frac{\omega}{2 \pi c} (y_1 - y_2)$$

Hence

$$R_2 - R_1 = \frac{2 \pi c}{\omega}(ul + vm)$$

Because $x_1, x_2, y_1,$ and $y_2$ are all much less than $R$, $R_1 \simeq R_2 \simeq R$. The differential area element, $dS$, may then be written as a differential element of solid angle of $R^2 \, dl \, dm$. Our expression for the mutual coherence function becomes

$$\Gamma_{12}(u, v, 0) = \iint_{\textrm{source}} I(l, m) e^{- \frac{i \omega}{c} \frac{2 \pi c}{ \omega} (ul + vm)} \, dl \, dm$$

Which reduces to

$$\Gamma_{12} (u, v, 0) = \iint_{\textrm{source}} I(l, m) e^{-2 \pi i (ul + vm)} \, dl \, dm$$

But the limits of these two integrals can be extended to cover the entire plane of the source as long as the source's intensity function is set to be zero over these regions. Hence,

$$\Gamma_{12}(u, v, 0) = \iint I(l, m) e^{-2 \pi i (ul + vm)} \, dl \, dm$$

which is the two-dimensional Fourier transform of the intensity function. This completes the proof.

== Assumptions of the theorem ==
The van Cittert–Zernike theorem rests on a number of assumptions, all of which are approximately true for nearly all astronomical sources. The most important assumptions of the theorem and their relevance to astronomical sources are discussed here.

=== Incoherence of the source ===
A spatially coherent source does not obey the van Cittert–Zernike theorem. To see why this is, suppose we observe a source consisting of two points, $a$ and $b$. Let us calculate the mutual coherence function between $P_1$ and $P_2$ in the plane of observation. From the principle of superposition, the electric field at $P_1$ is

$$E_1 = E_{a1} + E_{b1}$$

and at $P_2$ is

$$E_2 = E_{a2} + E_{b2}$$

so the mutual coherence function is

$$\langle E_1(t) E_2^*(t - \tau) \rangle = \langle ( E_{a1}(t) + E_{b1}(t) ) ( E_{a2}^*(t - \tau) + E_{b2}^*(t - \tau)) \rangle$$

Which becomes

$$\langle E_1(t) E_2^*(t - \tau) \rangle = \langle E_{a1}(t) E_{a2}^*(t - \tau) \rangle + \langle E_{a1}(t) E_{b2}^*(t - \tau) \rangle + \langle E_{b1}(t) E_{a2}^*(t - \tau) \rangle + \langle E_{b1}(t) E_{b2}^*(t - \tau) \rangle$$

If points $a$ and $b$ are coherent then the cross terms in the above equation do not vanish. In this case, when we calculate the mutual coherence function for an extended coherent source, we would not be able to simply integrate over the intensity function of the source; the presence of non-zero cross terms would give the mutual coherence function no simple form.

This assumption holds for most astronomical sources. Pulsars and masers are the only astronomical sources which exhibit coherence.

=== Distance to the source ===
In the proof of the theorem we assume that $R \gg x_1 - x_2$ and $R \gg y_1 - y_2$. That is, we assume that the distance to the source is much greater than the size of the observation area. More precisely, the van Cittert–Zernike theorem requires that we observe the source in the so-called far field. Hence if $D$ is the characteristic size of the observation area (e.g. in the case of a two-dish radio telescope, the length of the baseline between the two telescopes) then

$$R \gg \frac{D^2}{\lambda}$$

Using a reasonable baseline of 20 km for the Very Large Array at a wavelength of 1 cm, the far field distance is of order $4 \times 10^{10}$ m. Hence any astronomical object farther away than a parsec is in the far field. Objects in the Solar System are not necessarily in the far field, however, and so the van Cittert–Zernike theorem does not apply to them.

=== Angular size of the source ===
In the derivation of the van Cittert–Zernike theorem we write the direction cosines $l$ and $m$ as $\frac{1}{2}(x_1+x_2)/R$ and $\frac{1}{2}(y_1+y_2)/R$. There is, however, a third direction cosine which is neglected since $R \gg \frac{1}{2}(x_1 + x_2)$ and $R \gg \frac{1}{2}(y_1 + y_2)$; under these assumptions it is very close to unity. But if the source has a large angular extent, we cannot neglect this third direction cosine and the van Cittert–Zernike theorem no longer holds.

Because most astronomical sources subtend very small angles on the sky (typically much less than a degree), this assumption of the theorem is easily fulfilled in the domain of radio astronomy.

=== Quasi-monochromatic waves ===
The van Cittert–Zernike theorem assumes that the source is quasi-monochromatic. That is, if the source emits light over a range of frequencies, $\Delta \nu$, with mean frequency $\nu$, then it should satisfy

$$\frac{\Delta \nu}{\nu} \lesssim 1$$

Moreover, the bandwidth must be narrow enough that

$$\frac{\Delta \nu}{\nu} \ll \frac{1}{l u}$$

where $l$ is again the direction cosine indicating the size of the source and $u$ is the number of wavelengths between one end of the aperture and the other. Without this assumption, we cannot neglect $(R_2 - R_1)/c$ compared to $t$.

This requirement implies that a radio astronomer must restrict signals through a bandpass filter. Because radio telescopes almost always pass the signal through a relatively narrow bandpass filter, this assumption is typically satisfied in practice.

=== Two-dimensional source ===
We assume that our source lies in a two-dimensional plane. In reality, astronomical sources are three-dimensional. However, because they are in the far field, their angular distribution does not change with distance. Therefore, when we measure an astronomical source, its three-dimensional structure becomes projected upon a two-dimensional plane. This means that the van Cittert–Zernike theorem may be applied to measurements of astronomical sources, but we cannot determine structure along the line of sight with such measurements.

=== Homogeneity of the medium ===
The van Cittert–Zernike theorem assumes that the medium between the source and the imaging plane is homogeneous. If the medium is not homogeneous then light from one region of the source will be differentially refracted relative to other regions of the source due to the difference in light travel time through the medium. In the case of a heterogeneous medium one must use a generalization of the van Cittert–Zernike theorem, called Hopkins's formula.

Because the wavefront does not pass through a perfectly uniform medium as it travels through the interstellar (and possibly intergalactic) medium and into the Earth's atmosphere, the van Cittert–Zernike theorem does not hold exactly true for astronomical sources. In practice, however, variations in the refractive index of the interstellar and intergalactic media and Earth's atmosphere are small enough that the theorem is approximately true to within any reasonable experimental error. Such variations in the refractive index of the medium result only in slight perturbations from the case of a wavefront traveling through a homogeneous medium.

== Hopkins' formula ==
Suppose we have a situation identical to that considered when the van Cittert–Zernike theorem was derived, except that the medium is now heterogeneous. We therefore introduce the transmission function of the medium, $K(l, m, P, \nu)$. Following a similar derivation as before, we find that

$$\Gamma_{12}(l, m, 0) = \lambda^2 \iint I(l, m) K(l, m, P_1, \nu) K^*(l, m, P_2, \nu) \, dS$$

If we define

$$U(l, m, P_1) \equiv i \lambda K(l, m, P_1, \nu) \sqrt{I(l, m)}$$

then the mutual coherence function becomes

$$\Gamma_{12}(l, m, 0) = \iint U(l, m, P_1) U^*(l, m, P_2) \, dS$$

which is Hopkins's generalization of the van Cittert–Zernike theorem. In the special case of a homogeneous medium, the transmission function becomes

$$K(l, m, P, \nu) = -\frac{i e^{ikR}}{\lambda R}$$

in which case the mutual coherence function reduces to the Fourier transform of the brightness distribution of the source. The primary advantage of Hopkins's formula is that one may calculate the mutual coherence function of a source indirectly by measuring its brightness distribution.

== Applications of the theorem ==
=== Aperture synthesis ===
The van Cittert–Zernike theorem is crucial to the measurement of the brightness distribution of a source. With two telescopes, a radio astronomer (or an infrared or submillimeter astronomer) can measure the correlation between the electric field at the two dishes due to some point from the source. By measuring this correlation for many points on the source, the astronomer can reconstruct the visibility function of the source. By applying the van Cittert–Zernike theorem, the astronomer can then take the inverse Fourier transform of the visibility function to discover the brightness distribution of the source. This technique is known as aperture synthesis or synthesis imaging.

In practice, radio astronomers rarely recover the brightness distribution of a source by directly taking the inverse Fourier transform of a measured visibility function. Such a process would require a sufficient number of samples to satisfy the Nyquist sampling theorem; this is many more observations than are needed to approximately reconstruct the brightness distribution of the source. Astronomers therefore take advantage of physical constraints on the brightness distribution of astronomical sources to reduce the number of observations which must be made. Because the brightness distribution must be real and positive everywhere, the visibility function cannot take on arbitrary values in unsampled regions. Thus, a non-linear deconvolution algorithm like CLEAN or Maximum Entropy may be used to approximately reconstruct the brightness distribution of the source from a limited number of observations.

=== Adaptive optics ===
The van Cittert–Zernike theorem also places constraints on the sensitivity of an adaptive optics system. In an adaptive optics (AO) system, a distorted wavefront is provided and must be transformed to a distortion-free wavefront. An AO system must make a number of different corrections to remove the distortions from the wavefront. One such correction involves splitting the wavefront into two identical wavefronts and shifting one by some physical distance $s$ in the plane of the wavefront. The two wavefronts are then superimposed, creating a fringe pattern. By measuring the size and separation of the fringes, the AO system can determine phase differences along the wavefront. This technique is known as "shearing."

The sensitivity of this technique is limited by the van Cittert–Zernike theorem. If an extended source is imaged, the contrast between the fringes will be reduced by a factor proportional to the Fourier transform of the brightness distribution of the source. The van Cittert–Zernike theorem implies that the mutual coherence of an extended source imaged by an AO system will be the Fourier transform of its brightness distribution. An extended source will therefore change the mutual coherence of the fringes, reducing their contrast.

=== Free-electron laser ===
The van Cittert–Zernike theorem can be used to calculate the partial spatial coherence of radiation from a free-electron laser.

== See also ==
- Degree of coherence
- Coherence theory
- Visibility
- Hanbury Brown and Twiss effect
- Bose–Einstein correlations

== Bibliography ==
- Born, M. & Wolf, E.: Principles of optics, Pergamon Press, Oxford, 1987, p. 510
- Klein, Miles V. & Furtak, Thomas E.: Optics, John Wiley & Sons, New York, 1986, 2nd edition, p. 544-545
