= Leonard Ornstein =

Dutch physicist (1880–1941)

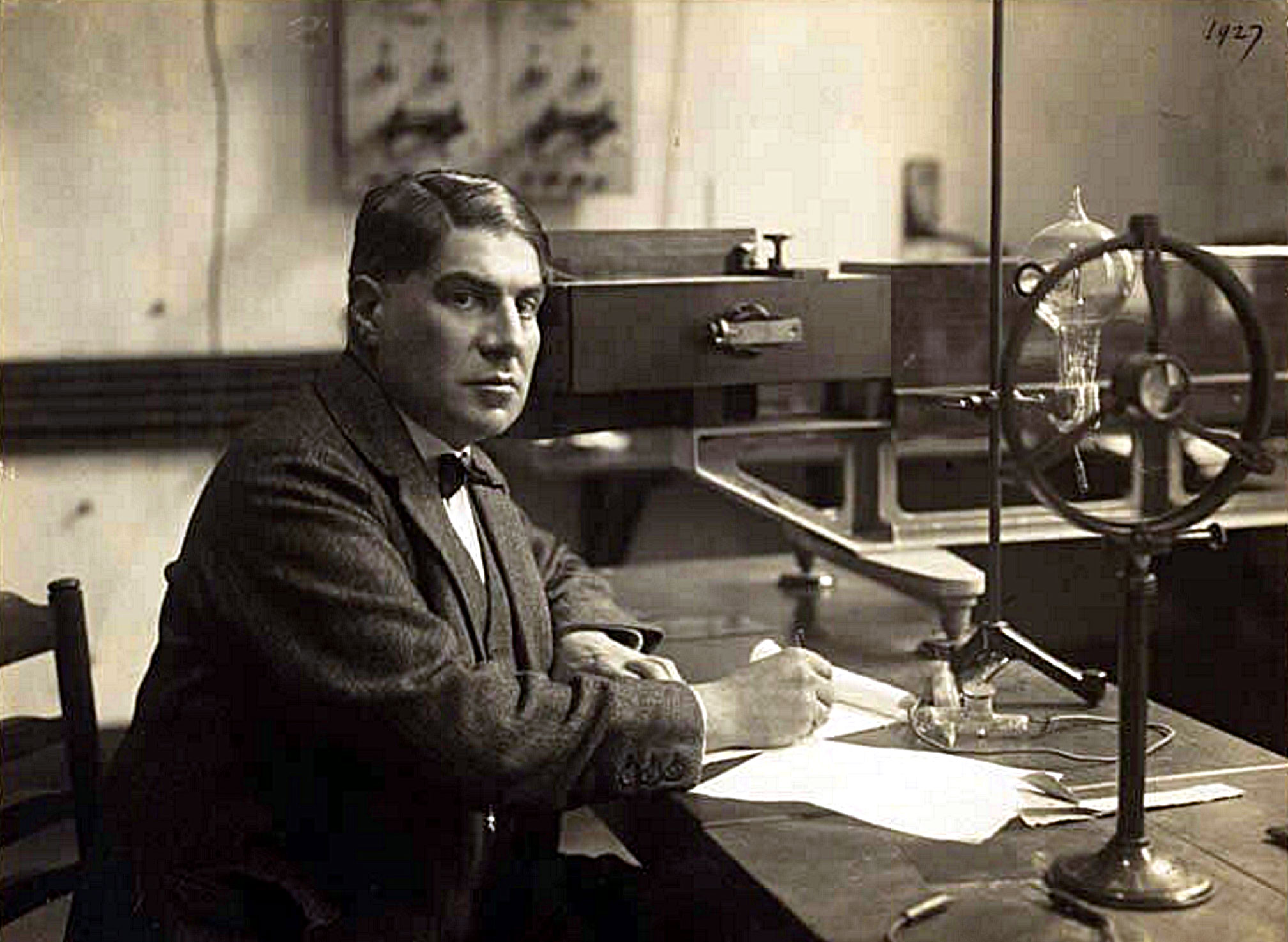
- Ornstein in 1927
- Born: Leonard Salomon Ornstein; 12 November 1880; Nijmegen, Gelderland, Netherlands
- Died: 20 May 1941 (aged 60); Utrecht, Netherlands
- Education: Leiden University (PhD)
- Known for: Ornstein–Zernike equation; Ornstein–Uhlenbeck process
- Scientific career
- Fields: Statistical physics
- Workplaces: University of Groningen (1909–14); Utrecht University (1914–40)
- Thesis: Toepassing der statistische mechanica van Gibbs op molekulair-theoretische vraagstukken (1908)
- Doctoral advisor: Hendrik Lorentz
- Doctoral students: Herman Burger (1918); Henk Dorgelo (1924); Marcel Minnaert (1925); Jan Frederik Schouten (1937)

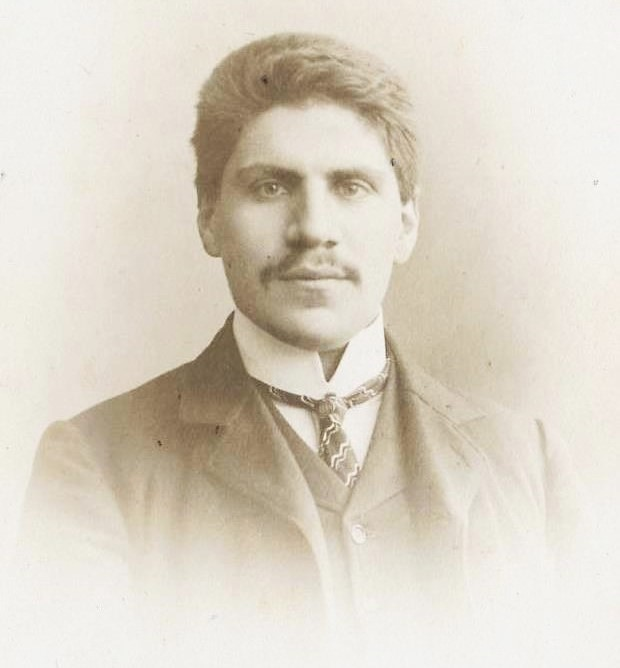
L. S. Ornstein, before 1909.

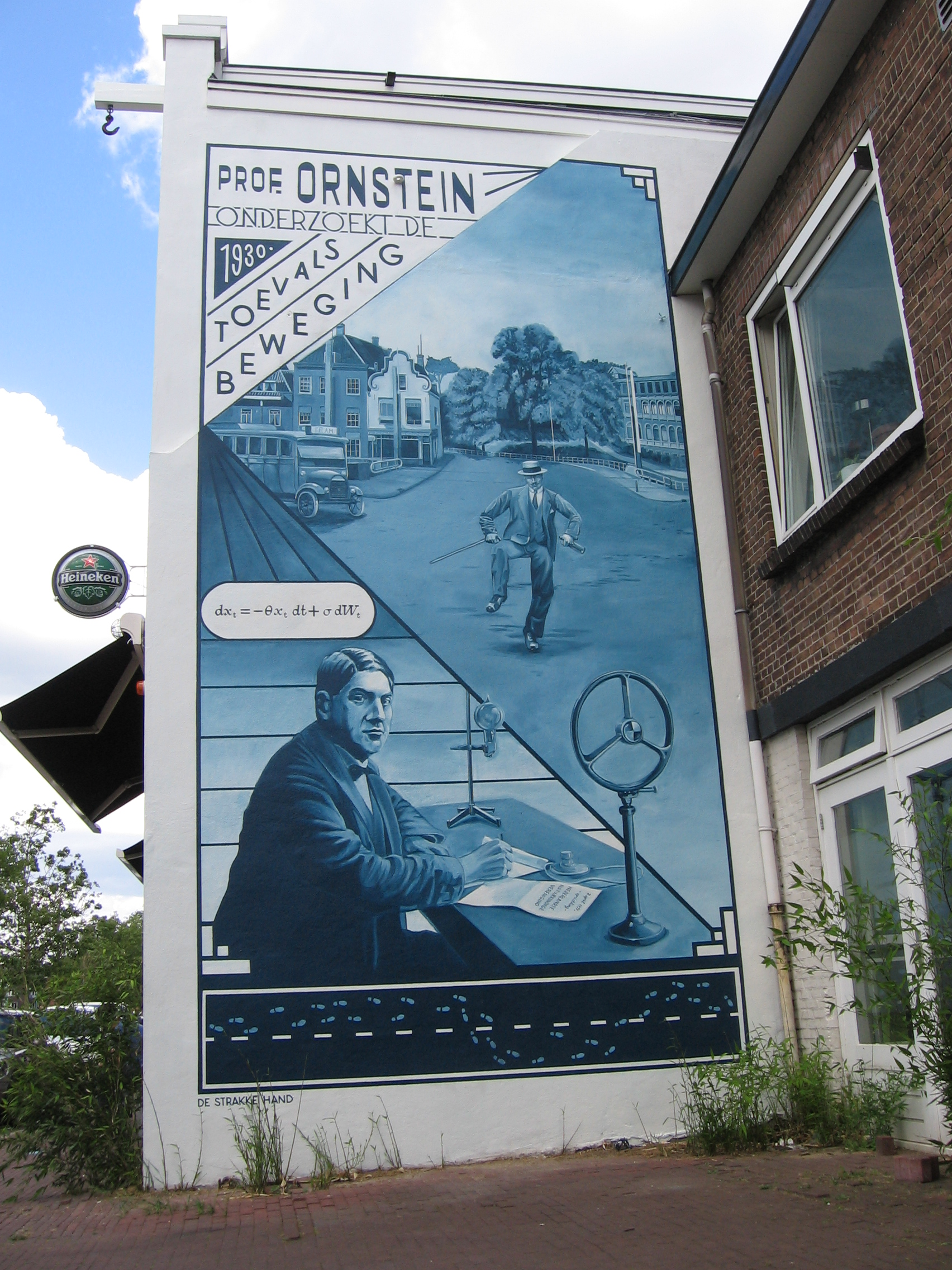
Dutch artist collective De Strakke Hand: Leonard Ornstein mural, showing Ornstein as a cofounder of the Dutch Physical Society (Netherlands Physical Society) at his desk in 1921, and illustrating twice the random walk of a drunkard with a simplified formula for the Ornstein–Uhlenbeck process. Oosterkade, Utrecht, The Netherlands, not far from Ornstein's laboratory. Translated text: Prof. Ornstein researches random motion 1930. Note that the artists used the historical 1927 photograph of Ornstein at his desk.

Leonard Salomon Ornstein (12 November 1880 – 20 May 1941) was a Dutch physicist.

== Education ==
Leonard Salomon Ornstein was born on 12 November 1880 in Nijmegen, Netherlands. He studied theoretical physics under Hendrik Lorentz at Leiden University. In 1908, he received his Ph.D. with a thesis concerning an application of the statistical mechanics of Josiah Willard Gibbs to molecular problems.

== Career ==
In 1909, Ornstein became a lecturer in theoretical physics at the University of Groningen. In 1914, he succeeded Peter Debye as Professor of Theoretical Physics at Utrecht University. In 1920, he became Director of the Utrecht Physical Institute and extended his research interests to experimental subjects. His precision measurements concerning intensities of spectral lines brought the Physical Laboratory in the international limelight.

With Frits Zernike, Ornstein introduced in 1914 the integral relation now known as the Ornstein–Zernike equation. Developed while studying density fluctuations near the critical point of a fluid, the equation separates the total correlation between particles into a direct correlation and indirect correlations transmitted through other particles; it subsequently became a basic framework of equilibrium liquid-state theory.

In 1930, Ornstein and George Uhlenbeck developed a theory of Brownian motion that explicitly treated the velocity of a particle subject to friction. They derived the probability distributions of the particle's velocity and displacement and related their treatment to the Fokker–Planck equation. Their model became known as the Ornstein–Uhlenbeck process.

Together with Gilles Holst, Director of the Philips Natuurkundig Laboratorium, Ornstein was the driving force behind establishing the Netherlands Physical Society in 1921. From 1939 until November 1940, he was chairman of this society. From 1918 until 1922, he was chairman of the Dutch Zionist Society. In 1929, he became a member of the Royal Netherlands Academy of Arts and Sciences.

== Later life and death ==
Immediately after the May 1940 German invasion of the Netherlands in World War II, Ornstein's friend, the astronomer Peter van de Kamp, offered to bring him and his family to the United States. However, he did not accept this offer, since, as he put it, he would not leave his laboratory in Utrecht.

The Nazis targeted Ornstein for his Jewish heritage, and the university dismissed him in September 1940, barring him from entering his laboratory; in November, the university's dismissal became official. On 29 November, he withdrew his membership of the Netherlands Physical Society. During this period he increasingly distanced himself from public life, to the degree that he no longer wished to receive guests at home.

Ornstein died on 20 May 1941, a year after the German invasion, and six months after being barred from the university.

== Honors ==
One of the five buildings of the Department of Physics at the University of Utrecht is named the Leonard S. Ornstein Laboratory in his honor.

== Publications ==
- Toepassing der statistische mechanica van Gibbs op moleculair-theoretische vraagstukken, Ph.D. thesis, 26 March 1908
- Problemen der kinetische theorie van de stof, 1915
- Strahlungsgesetz und Intensität von Mehrfachlinien, 1924
- Intensität der Komponenten im Zeemaneffekt, 1924
- On the theory of the Brownian motion, 1930
- De beteekenis der natuurkunde voor cultuur en maatschappij, 1932

== See also ==
- Uithof
- Virial coefficient
