= Litzenberger =

Litzenberger is a surname and it may refer to:

- Earle D. Litzenberger, American diplomat
- Ed Litzenberger (1932–2010) Canadian ice hockey player
- Caroline Litzenberger (1942–2025) American historian, writer, priest, and educator
- Robert Litzenberger (born 1943) American financial economist, investment banker, and educator

== See also ==
- Berger (surname)
