= Hildburghausen II – Sonneberg II =

Electoral constituency in Thuringia, Germany

Hildburghausen II – Sonneberg II is an electoral constituency (German: Wahlkreis) represented in the Landtag of Thuringia. It elects one member via first-past-the-post voting. Under the current constituency numbering system, it is designated as constituency 20. It covers the eastern part of Hildburghausen district and the northern part of Sonneberg district.

Hildburghausen II – Sonneberg II was created for the 1994 state election. Since 2024, it has been represented by Melanie Berger of the Alternative for Germany (AfD).

== Geography ==
As of the 2019 state election, Hildburghausen II – Sonneberg II covers the eastern part of Hildburghausen district and the northern part of Sonneberg district, specifically the municipalities of Auengrund, Brünn/Thür., Eisfeld, Masserberg, Schleusegrund, and Schleusingen (from Hildburghausen), and Goldisthal, Lauscha, Neuhaus am Rennweg (excluding Lichte und Piesau), and Steinach (from Sonneberg).

== Members ==
The constituency was held by the Christian Democratic Union from its creation in 1994 until 2024. Its first representative was Bernd Wolf, who served from 1994 to 2004, followed by Henry Worm from 2004 until 2024. At the 2024 election, the constituency was gained by Melanie Berger of Alternative for Germany.

| Election | Member | Party | % |
|---|---|---|---|
| 1994 | Bernd Wolf | CDU | 39.7 |
| 1999 | Bernd Wolf | CDU | 48.6 |
| 2004 | Henry Worm | CDU | 43.4 |
| 2009 | Henry Worm | CDU | 35.8 |
| 2014 | Henry Worm | CDU | 44.0 |
| 2019 | Henry Worm | CDU | 34.1 |
| 2024 | Melanie Berger | AfD | 41.6 |

== Election results ==
=== 2024 election ===
State election (2024): Hildburghausen II/Sonneberg II
| Notes: | Blue background denotes the winner of the electorate vote. Pink background denotes a candidate elected from their party list. Yellow background denotes an electorate win by a list member, or other incumbent. A ✓ or ✗ denotes status of any incumbent, win or lose respectively. | | | | | | |
| Party | Candidate | Votes | % | ±% | Party votes | % | ±% |
|---|---|---|---|---|---|---|---|
| AfD | Melanie Berger | 10,257 | 41.6 | ▲17.9 | 9,516 | 38.2 | ▲15.4 |
| CDU | ✗ Henry Worm | 8,402 | 34.1 | Steady | 5,709 | 22.9 | ▼3.2 |
| BSW | | | | | 4,288 | 17.2 | |
| Left | Linda Strong | 2,724 | 11.1 | ▼17.1 | 2,611 | 10.5 | ▼22.4 |
| FW | Robin Lützelberger | 2,031 | 8.2 | | 901 | 3.6 | |
| SPD | Anja Beauty | 1,228 | 5.0 | ▼1.4 | 851 | 3.4 | ▼3.5 |
| Greens | | | | | 221 | 0.9 | ▼2.1 |
| APT | | | | | 196 | 0.8 | ▼0.4 |
| FDP | | | | | 188 | 0.8 | ▼2.7 |
| Values | | | | | 118 | 0.5 | |
| Familie | | | | | 100 | 0.5 | |
| BD | | | | | 94 | 0.4 | |
| Pirates | | | | | 66 | 0.3 | Steady |
| ÖDP | | | | | 50 | 0.2 | ▼0.1 |
| MLPD | | | | | 23 | 0.1 | ▼0.1 |
| Informal votes | | 493 | | | 203 | | |
| Total valid votes | | 24,642 | | | 24,932 | | |
| Turnout | | 25,135 | 74.2 | ▲11.2 | | | |
| AfD gain from CDU | Majority | 1,855 | 7.5 | | | | |

=== 2019 election ===
State election (2019): Hildburghausen II – Sonneberg II
| Notes: | Blue background denotes the winner of the electorate vote. Pink background denotes a candidate elected from their party list. Yellow background denotes an electorate win by a list member, or other incumbent. A ✓ or ✗ denotes status of any incumbent, win or lose respectively. | | | | | | |
| Party | Candidate | Votes | % | ±% | Party votes | % | ±% |
|---|---|---|---|---|---|---|---|
| CDU | ✓ Henry Worm | 7,323 | 34.1 | ▼9.9 | 5,630 | 26.1 | ▼11.5 |
| Left | Tilo Kummer | 6,069 | 28.2 | ▼3.1 | 7,089 | 32.9 | ▲3.0 |
| AfD | Holger Winterstein | 5,089 | 23.7 | | 4,908 | 22.8 | ▲14.0 |
| SPD | Claudia Scheerschmidt | 1,367 | 6.4 | ▼7.7 | 1,485 | 6.9 | ▼5.6 |
| Greens | Antje Duckwitz | 888 | 4.1 | ▲0.1 | 649 | 3.0 | ▼0.3 |
| FDP | Robert-Martin Montag | 706 | 3.3 | ▲0.2 | 764 | 3.5 | ▲1.6 |
| MLPD | Klaus Dimler | 52 | 0.2 | | 42 | 0.2 | |
| List-only parties | | | | | 969 | 4.5 | |
| Informal votes | | 286 | | | 244 | | |
| Total valid votes | | 21,494 | | | 21,536 | | |
| Turnout | | 21,780 | 63.0 | ▲12.6 | | | |
| CDU hold | Majority | 1,254 | 5.9 | ▼6.8 | | | |

=== 2014 election ===
State election (2014): Hildburghausen II – Sonneberg II
| Notes: | Blue background denotes the winner of the electorate vote. Pink background denotes a candidate elected from their party list. Yellow background denotes an electorate win by a list member, or other incumbent. A ✓ or ✗ denotes status of any incumbent, win or lose respectively. | | | | | | |
| Party | Candidate | Votes | % | ±% | Party votes | % | ±% |
|---|---|---|---|---|---|---|---|
| CDU | ✓ Henry Worm | 7,437 | 44.0 | ▲8.2 | 6,398 | 37.6 | ▲4.6 |
| Left | Stefan Harzer | 5,288 | 31.3 | ▼3.6 | 5,096 | 29.9 | ▼2.4 |
| SPD | Alexander Humann | 2,384 | 14.1 | ▼1.6 | 2,128 | 12.5 | ▼4.6 |
| AfD | | | | | 1,494 | 8.8 | |
| Greens | Karen Thimel | 673 | 4.0 | | 565 | 3.3 | ▼0.1 |
| NPD | Uwe Bäz-Dölle | 595 | 3.5 | ▼1.7 | 484 | 2.8 | ▼1.3 |
| FDP | Thomas Vollmar | 518 | 3.1 | ▼5.4 | 323 | 1.9 | ▼5.0 |
| List-only parties | | | | | 542 | 3.2 | |
| Informal votes | | 298 | | | 163 | | |
| Total valid votes | | 16,895 | | | 17,030 | | |
| Turnout | | 17,193 | 50.4 | ▼3.5 | | | |
| CDU hold | Majority | 2,149 | 12.7 | ▲11.8 | | | |

=== 2009 election ===
State election (2009): Hildburghausen II – Sonneberg II
| Notes: | Blue background denotes the winner of the electorate vote. Pink background denotes a candidate elected from their party list. Yellow background denotes an electorate win by a list member, or other incumbent. A ✓ or ✗ denotes status of any incumbent, win or lose respectively. | | | | | | |
| Party | Candidate | Votes | % | ±% | Party votes | % | ±% |
|---|---|---|---|---|---|---|---|
| CDU | ✓ Henry Worm | 6,928 | 35.8 | ▼7.6 | 6,436 | 33.0 | ▼12.6 |
| Left | Wolfgang May | 6,756 | 34.9 | ▲2.7 | 6,300 | 32.3 | ▲5.7 |
| SPD | David Fritsch | 3,034 | 15.7 | ▼2.7 | 3,342 | 17.1 | ▲1.2 |
| FDP | Felix Rösel | 1,656 | 8.5 | ▲2.5 | 1,343 | 6.9 | ▲3.9 |
| NPD | Uwe Bäz-Dölle | 998 | 5.2 | | 809 | 4.1 | ▲2.5 |
| List-only parties | | | | | 1,293 | 6.6 | |
| Informal votes | | 517 | | | 366 | | |
| Total valid votes | | 19,372 | | | 19,523 | | |
| Turnout | | 19,889 | 53.9 | ▲2.5 | | | |
| CDU hold | Majority | 172 | 0.9 | ▼10.3 | | | |

=== 2004 election ===
State election (2004): Hildburghausen II – Sonneberg II
| Notes: | Blue background denotes the winner of the electorate vote. Pink background denotes a candidate elected from their party list. Yellow background denotes an electorate win by a list member, or other incumbent. A ✓ or ✗ denotes status of any incumbent, win or lose respectively. | | | | | | |
| Party | Candidate | Votes | % | ±% | Party votes | % | ±% |
|---|---|---|---|---|---|---|---|
| CDU | Henry Worm | 8,107 | 43.4 | ▼5.2 | 8,669 | 45.6 | ▼5.2 |
| PDS | Wolfgang May | 6,011 | 32.2 | ▲8.9 | 5,063 | 26.6 | ▲3.4 |
| SPD | Bernd Lauche | 3,426 | 18.4 | ▼4.2 | 3,033 | 15.9 | ▼2.6 |
| FDP | Thomas Vollmar | 1,121 | 6.0 | ▲4.1 | 577 | 3.0 | ▲1.9 |
| List-only parties | | | | | 1,677 | 8.8 | |
| Informal votes | | 1,235 | | | 881 | | |
| Total valid votes | | 18,665 | | | 19,019 | | |
| Turnout | | 19,900 | 51.4 | ▼10.1 | | | |
| CDU hold | Majority | 2,096 | 11.2 | ▼14.1 | | | |

=== 1999 election ===
State election (1999): Hildburghausen II – Sonneberg II
| Notes: | Blue background denotes the winner of the electorate vote. Pink background denotes a candidate elected from their party list. Yellow background denotes an electorate win by a list member, or other incumbent. A ✓ or ✗ denotes status of any incumbent, win or lose respectively. | | | | | | |
| Party | Candidate | Votes | % | ±% | Party votes | % | ±% |
|---|---|---|---|---|---|---|---|
| CDU | ✓ Bernd Wolf | 11,541 | 48.6 | ▲8.9 | 12,130 | 50.8 | ▲8.1 |
| PDS | Stefan Hiederich | 5,538 | 23.3 | ▲8.1 | 5,531 | 23.2 | ▲7.2 |
| SPD | Uwe Höhn | 5,375 | 22.6 | ▼9.1 | 4,409 | 18.5 | ▼12.0 |
| REP | Manfred Schlichting | 547 | 2.3 | ▲0.4 | 141 | 0.6 | ▼1.3 |
| FDP | Thomas Vollmar | 449 | 1.9 | ▼5.5 | 272 | 1.1 | ▼2.6 |
| Greens | Richard Schmid | 307 | 1.3 | ▼2.8 | 228 | 1.0 | ▼2.1 |
| List-only parties | | | | | 1,149 | 4.8 | |
| Informal votes | | 462 | | | 359 | | |
| Total valid votes | | 23,757 | | | 23,860 | | |
| Turnout | | 24,219 | 61.5 | ▼15.5 | | | |
| CDU hold | Majority | 6,003 | 25.3 | ▲17.3 | | | |

=== 1994 election ===
State election (1994): Hildburghausen II – Sonneberg II
| Notes: | Blue background denotes the winner of the electorate vote. Pink background denotes a candidate elected from their party list. Yellow background denotes an electorate win by a list member, or other incumbent. A ✓ or ✗ denotes status of any incumbent, win or lose respectively. | | | | | | |
| Party | Candidate | Votes | % | ±% | Party votes | % | ±% |
|---|---|---|---|---|---|---|---|
| CDU | Bernd Wolf | 11,567 | 39.7 | | 12,458 | 42.7 | |
| SPD | | 9,236 | 31.7 | | 8,896 | 30.5 | |
| PDS | | 4,436 | 15.2 | | 4,679 | 16.0 | |
| FDP | | 2,153 | 7.4 | | 1,088 | 3.7 | |
| Greens | | 1,180 | 4.1 | | 897 | 3.1 | |
| REP | | 562 | 1.9 | | 541 | 1.9 | |
| List-only parties | | | | | 643 | 2.2 | |
| Informal votes | | 1,067 | | | 999 | | |
| Total valid votes | | 29,134 | | | 29,202 | | |
| Turnout | | 30,201 | 77.0 | | | | |
| CDU win new seat | Majority | 2,331 | 8.0 | | | | |
