= Coherence theory (optics) =

Study in optics

In physics, coherence theory is the study of optical effects arising from partially coherent light and radio sources. Partially coherent sources are sources where the coherence time or coherence length are limited by bandwidth, by thermal noise, or by other effect. Many aspects of modern coherence theory are studied in quantum optics.

The theory of partial coherence was awoken in the 1930s due to work by Pieter Hendrik van Cittert and Frits Zernike.

== Topics in coherence theory ==
- Interferometric visibility – Measure of interference in a wave system
- Mutual coherence function
- Degree of coherence – Concept in quantum optics
- Van Cittert–Zernike theorem
- Michelson stellar interferometer – Type of array used for astronomical observations
- Correlation interferometry – Astronomy device
- Hanbury–Brown and Twiss effect – Quantum correlations related to wave-particle duality
- Phase-contrast microscope – Optical microscopy technique
- Englert–Greenberger duality relation – A relation of quantum optics

== See also ==
- Nonclassical light
- Optical coherence tomography
