= Frits Zernike =

Dutch physicist (1888–1966)

Frits Zernike ForMemRS
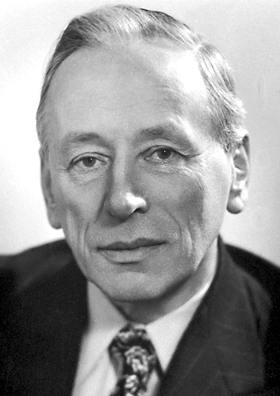
- Zernike in 1953
- Born: Frederick Zernike; 16 July 1888; Amsterdam, Netherlands
- Died: 10 March 1966 (aged 77); Amersfoort, Utrecht, Netherlands
- Education: University of Amsterdam
- Known for: Ornstein–Zernike equation (1914); Inventing phase-contrast microscopy (1932); Van Cittert–Zernike theorem (1938)
- Spouses: Dora van Bommel van Vloten (died 1945); Lena Koperberg-Baanders (m. 1954)
- Awards: Rumford Medal (1952); Nobel Prize in Physics (1953); ForMemRS (1956)
- Scientific career
- Fields: Physics
- Workplaces: University of Groningen (from 1913)

Frederik "Frits" Zernike (Dutch: [frɪt ˈsɛrnikə]; 16 July 1888 – 10 March 1966) was a Dutch physicist who received the Nobel Prize in Physics in 1953 for his invention of the phase-contrast microscope.

== Early life and education ==
Frederik Zernike was born on 16 July 1888 in Amsterdam, the second son of Carl Frederik August Zernike and Antje Dieperink. Both parents were teachers of mathematics, and he especially shared his father's passion for physics. In 1905, he enrolled at the University of Amsterdam, studying chemistry (his major), mathematics, and physics. He received his B.Sc. in Chemistry in 1912 and his Ph.D. in Physics in 1915.

== Academic career ==
In 1912, Zernike was awarded a prize for his doctoral work on opalescence in gases. In 1913, he became assistant to Jacobus Kapteyn in the astronomical laboratory at the University of Groningen. In 1914, Zernike and Leonard Ornstein were jointly responsible for the derivation of the Ornstein–Zernike equation in critical-point theory. In 1915, he became lector in theoretical mechanics and mathematical physics at the same university and in 1920 he was promoted to Professor of Mathematical Physics.

In 1930, Zernike was conducting research into spectral lines when he discovered that the so-called ghost lines that occur to the left and right of each primary line in spectra created by means of a diffraction grating, have their phase shifted from that of the primary line by 90 degrees. It was at a Physical and Medical Congress in Wageningen in 1933, that Zernike first described his phase contrast technique in microscopy. He extended his method to test the figure of concave mirrors. His discovery lay at the base of the first phase contrast microscope, built during World War II. The phase-contrast microscope became particularly important in biology because it made colorless, transparent living cells visible without staining them.

He also made another contribution in the field of optics, relating to the efficient description of the imaging defects or aberrations of optical imaging systems like microscopes and telescopes. The representation of aberrations was originally based on the theory developed by Ludwig Seidel in the middle of the nineteenth century. Seidel's representation was based on power series expansions and did not allow a clear separation between various types and orders of aberrations. Zernike's orthogonal circle polynomials provided a solution to the long-standing problem of the optimum 'balancing' of the various aberrations of an optical instrument. Since the 1960s, Zernike's circle polynomials are widely used in optical design, optical metrology and image analysis.

Zernike's work helped awaken interest in coherence theory, the study of partially coherent light sources. In 1938 he published a simpler derivation of Van Cittert's 1934 theorem on the coherence of radiation from distant sources, now known as the Van Cittert–Zernike theorem.

== Personal life and death ==
Zernike was married to Dora van Bommel van Vloten, with whom he had one son. Dora died in 1945. He married his second wife Lena Koperberg-Baanders in 1954. After his retirement, they moved to Naarden.

Zernike died in hospital in Amersfoort on 10 March 1966 after suffering illness the last years of his life.

His granddaughter is the journalist Kate Zernike. His great-nephew Gerard 't Hooft won the Nobel Prize in Physics in 1999.

== Recognition ==
=== Memberships ===
Year	Organization	Type	Ref.
1946	Royal Netherlands Academy of Arts and Sciences	Member	
1954	(United States) Optical Society of America	Honorary Member	
1956	(United Kingdom) Royal Society	Foreign Member	

=== Awards ===
Year	Organization	Award	Citation	Ref.
1952	(United Kingdom) Royal Society	Rumford Medal	"In recognition of his outstanding work in the development of phase contrast microscopy."	
1953	(Sweden) Royal Swedish Academy of Sciences	Nobel Prize in Physics	"For his demonstration of the phase contrast method, especially for his invention of the phase contrast microscope."	

== Commemoration ==
The university complex (Zernike Campus) to the north of the city of Groningen is named after him, as is the crater Zernike on the Moon and the minor planet 11779 Zernike.

The Oz Enterprise, a Linux distribution, was named after Leonard Ornstein and Frits Zernike.

== See also ==
- Leonard Ornstein
- Coherence theory
- Fourier optics
- Live cell imaging
- Optical aberration
- Phase-contrast X-ray imaging
- Physical optics
