= Albert Burger =

Albert Burger may refer to:

- Albert Bürger (firefighter) (1913–1996), German fire official
- Albert Burger (alpine skier) (1955–2023), German Olympic alpine skier
- Albert Burger (politician) (1925–1981), German politician

== See also ==
- Albert Berger, film producer
