= Bürgermeista =

German musician

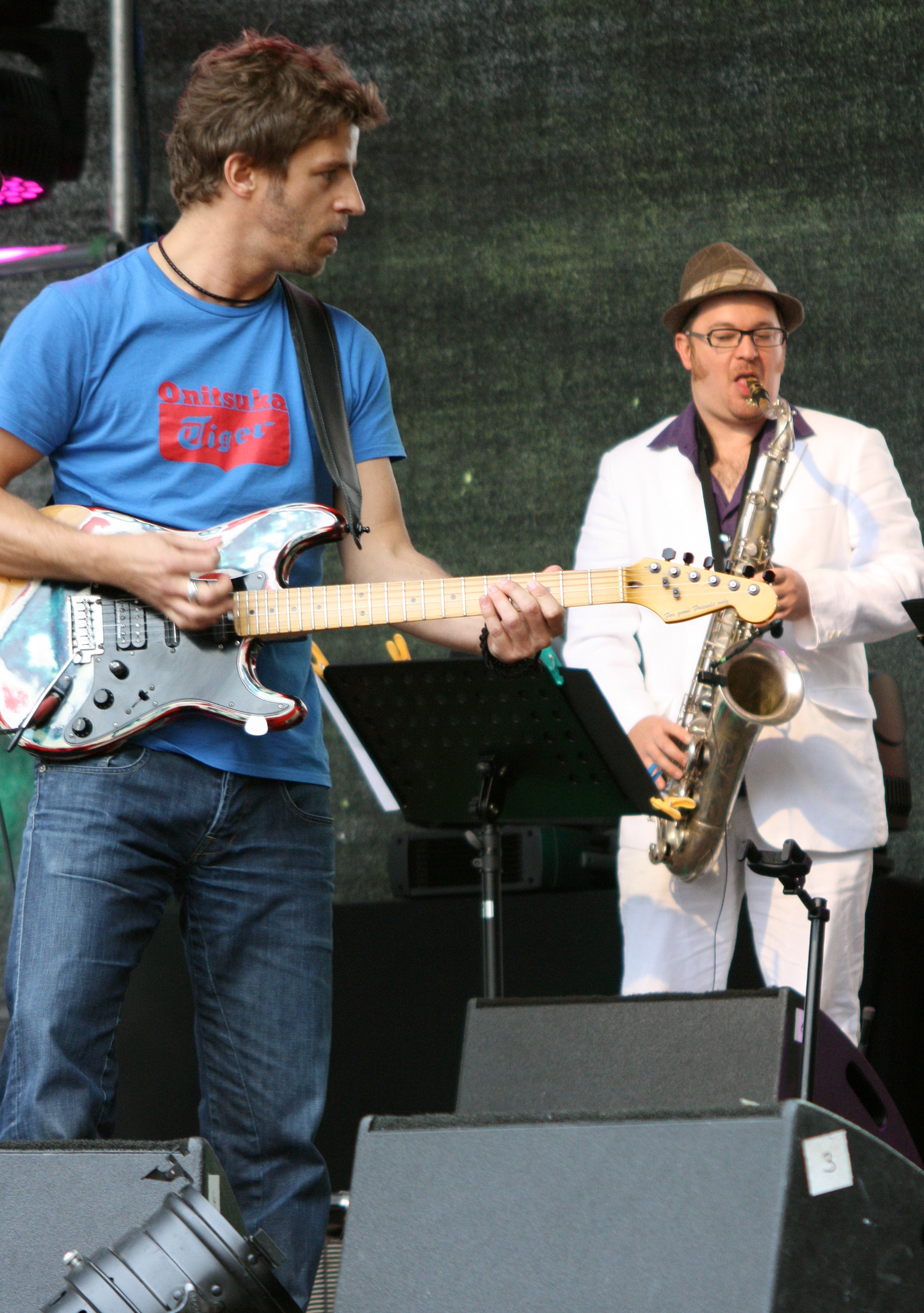
- Roland Bürger (left)

Background information
- Born: Roland Bürger; 1972(?)
- Origin: German
- Instrument: Guitar
- Website: www.buergermeista.de

Roland Bürger (born 1972(?)), better known as "Bürgermeista" is a German guitarist and founder of the band Bürgermeista & Die Gemeinderäte in 2010. "Bürgermeista" is Bavarian for Bürgermeister (mayor), "Gemeinderäte" are the members of a municipal council.

== Career ==
Bürger originally comes from Dorfen near Munich. He was known as a guitarist of several musical groups. In 2008 he wrote the song Locker macha (Bavarian dialect for "locker machen", ~ loosen up), recorded it together with colleagues as a reggae song. and sent it to several radio stations. In the summer of 2009, a radio personality of Radio Gong 96,3, a well-known local radio in Munich, played the song in his morning program, and afterwards at the request of listeners frequently in his radio show after June 23, 2009. The song became number one of the Reggae & Ska downloads on amazon.com. Soon other local radio stations noticed the song, and after Bürger got a record contract at 313music JWP. The song was recorded on video. On 21 August 2009 the song was published on CD, and entered in the Media Control Top100 Singles Charts. On 4 September 2009, during the Oktoberfest, the song climbed on place 39. Altogether the song was seven weeks on the charts.

== Discography ==
=== Albums ===
- Gewählt (Bürgermeista & die Gemeinderäte, 2010)

=== Singles ===
- Locker macha (2009)
- Guad (2009)
- Do reggae mi ned auf (Bürgermeista & die Gemeinderäte, 2010)
- Heid is da ois is ma Wurst-Dog (Bürgermeista & die Gemeinderäte, 2011)
