= Netherlands Physical Society =

Association of Dutch physicists

- Abbreviation: NNV
- Formation: 2 April 1921; 105 years ago
- Type: Scientific
- Purpose: Promote physics and physicists' interests
- Headquarters: Amsterdam
- Location: Netherlands
- Members: 4000
- Official language: Dutch
- President: Dr. Christa Hooijer
- Website: www.nnv.nl

The Netherlands Physical Society (Dutch: Nederlandse Natuurkundige Vereniging, NNV) is the professional society of physicists in the Netherlands and a member of the European Physical Society. Established in 1921, the goals of the society are to promote physics and to serve the interests of physicists in the Netherlands. Its main activities are publishing the Dutch physics journal Nederlands Tijdschrift voor Natuurkunde (NTvN), the organisation of an annual physics conference and the co-development of the physics education curriculum in the Netherlands.

== Sections ==
The NNV has the following sections that focus on either a particular field of physics or a specific topic of interest to physicists:

- Atomic, Molecular and Optical physics
- Energy and Climate
- History and Foundations of Physics
- Education and Communication
- Physics of Plasmas and Gas discharges
- Subatomic Physics
