= Mateusz Berger =

Polish lawyer

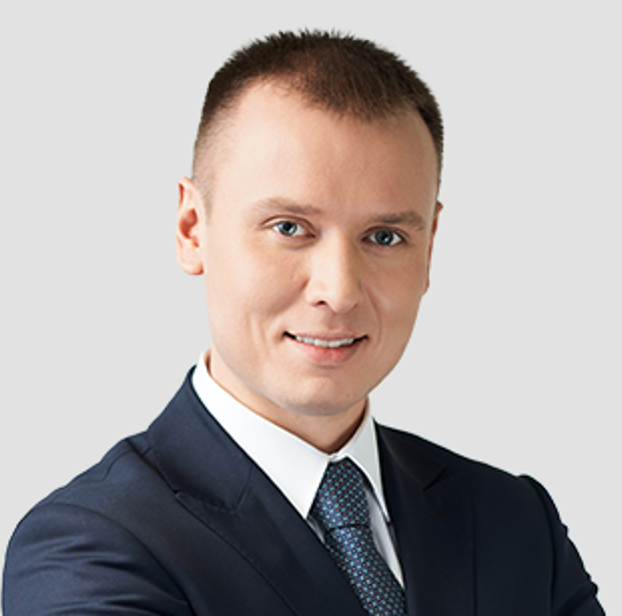

Secretary of state, Chancellery of the Prime Minister of Poland
- Incumbent
- Assumed office 25 July 2022
- Prime Minister: Mateusz Morawiecki

Personal details
- Born: 30 July 1986 (age 39) Warsaw

Mateusz Berger (born 30 July 1986, in Warsaw, Poland) is a Polish lawyer.

== Career ==
For many years he worked as a lawyer in a Warsaw law firm, and then in the legal department of the bank. He was the Director of the Department of Supervised and Subordinate Units in the Ministry of Development and the Director of the State Treasury Department in the Chancellery of the Prime Minister. He was involved in the creation of the Aviation Group. For over 5 years he was a member and then chairman of the supervisory board of LOT Polish Airlines.

He has extensive experience in the field of investment financing, corporate supervision and legal aspects of the activities of commercial companies. He was a member of the supervisory board of the Industrial Development Agency S.A. from May 2017 to December 2019, and a member of the Board of Directors of IDA S.A. from December 2019. He supervised investment and restructuring projects. He was involved in offshore wind energy projects, in particular in ensuring the participation of Polish companies in the construction of this energy segment.

From July 2022 to June 2023, he was Secretary of State, Government Plenipotentiary for Strategic Energy Infrastructure in Poland. On August 15, 2023, he became the president of the management board of Polskie Elektrownie Jądrowe.
