= Melanie Berger =

German politician (born 1982)

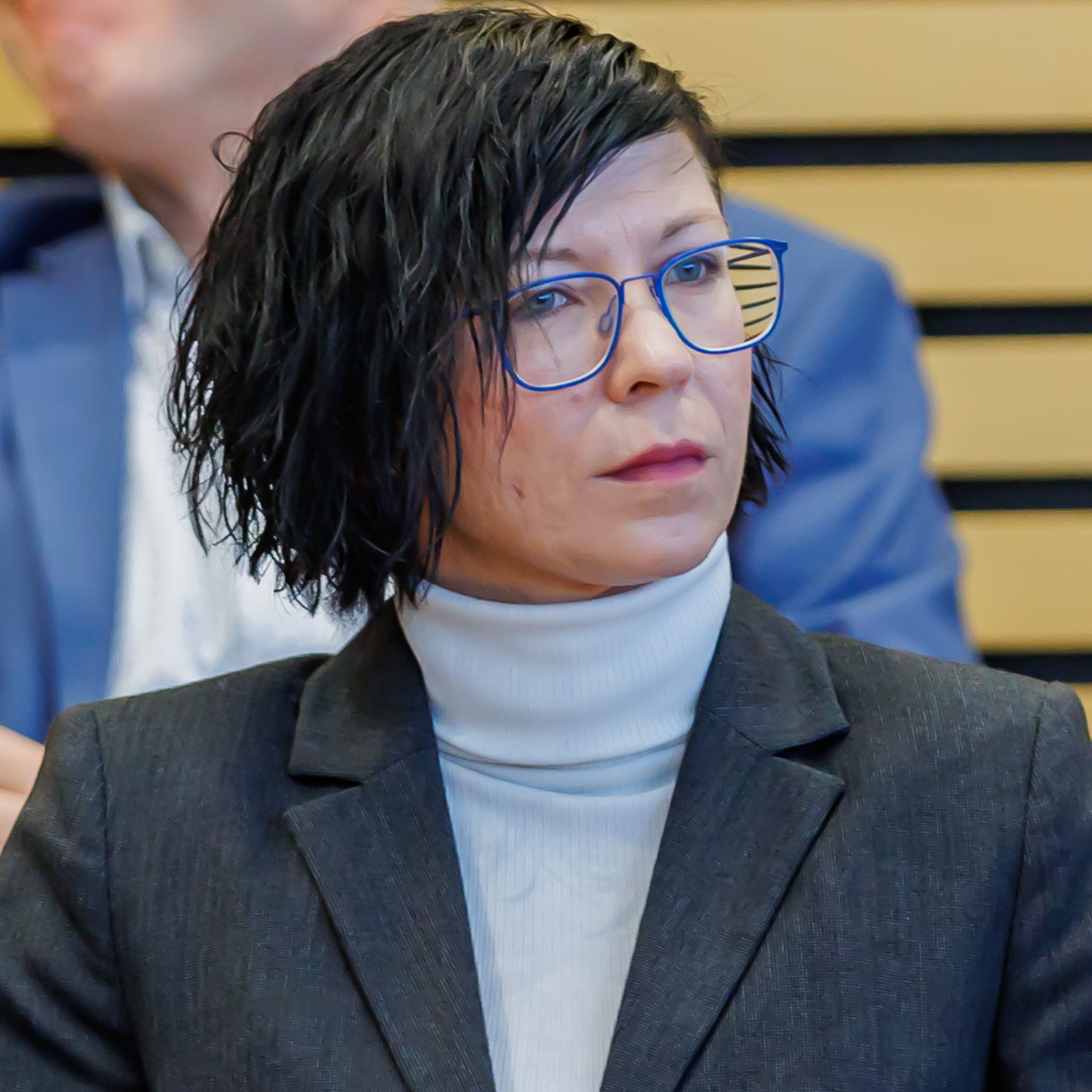
- Berger in 2024

Member of the Landtag of Thuringia
- Incumbent
- Assumed office 26 September 2024
- Preceded by: Henry Worm
- Constituency: Hildburghausen II – Sonneberg II

Personal details
- Born: 1982 (age 43–44) Frankfurt (Oder)
- Party: Alternative for Germany

Melanie Berger (born 1982 in Frankfurt (Oder)) is a German politician serving as a member of the Landtag of Thuringia since 2024. She has been a district councillor of Sonneberg since 2025.
