= Nelle G. Burger =

American temperance leader (1869 –1957)

- Born: Nelle (or "Nellie") Gilham Lemon; July 27, 1869; St. Louis, Missouri, U.S.
- Died: December 24, 1957; Springfield, Missouri, U.S.
- Occupations: social reformer; organizational leader
- Organization: Woman's Christian Temperance Union
- Movement: temperance
- Spouse: Charles A. Burger (m. 1886; died 1936)

Nelle G. Burger (née Lemon; July 27, 1869 – December 24, 1957) was an American temperance leader. For 34 years, she served as president of the Missouri State Woman's Christian Temperance Union (W.C.T.U.).

== Early life and education ==
Nelle (or "Nellie") Gilham Lemon was born in St. Louis, Missouri, July 27, 1869. Her parents were Thomas James Lemon (1845–1935) and Irene E. (Jacobs) Lemon (1849-?). Nelle's siblings were Daisey, Reginal, Edgar, and Harry. While still a child, the family moved to Roodhouse, Illinois.

She was educated in the high school in Roodhouse.

== Career ==
In Roodhouse, her interest in temperance work began by a chance invitation to attend a meeting of the local W.C.T.U.

After she married Charles A. Burger (1862–1936) on September 1, 1886, she moved with her husband to Clark, Randolph County, Missouri, and became actively involved in every feature of the temperance cause. In December 1896, Burger organized a W.C.T.U. at Rocky Comfort, Missouri. She was subsequently appointed national organizer of the W.C.T.U., and in that interest lectured in every State of the U.S., and in Canada.

By appointment of Governor Frederick D. Gardner, she became a member of the State Board of Charities and Corrections, and she was also a member of the State Board of War Charities, besides being president of her State and county W.C.T.U.. She also served as editor of the Missouri Counselor.

In 1910, as a representative of the World's W.C.T.U., Burger went to Mexico and succeeded in interesting President Porfirio Díaz in temperance work to the extent of securing an appropriation of money to supplement the contribution of the W.C.T.U. for systematic temperance instruction in that country. The Mexican Government also provided her with free transportation. She held meetings in every Mexican State except two, addressing the people through an interpreter furnished by the Government. She wrote scientific temperance lessons for the city schools and for those seventeen States.

In 1913, with Burger as president, the Missouri W.C.T.U. became the only woman's organization in the State outside of the regular suffrage societies which endorsed suffrage.

In 1925, the Missouri W.C.T.U., though Burger as its president, took action favorable to the enactment of the Hagenow coal tar products bill which was a part of the Missouri Pharmaceutical Association legislative program. Burger appeared before the officials of 18 women's organizations and church associations and told them of the freedom with which coal tar products were sold and endorsed the Hagenow bill. At the same time, she paid the druggists a high compliment for desiring to control the sale of dangerous drugs.

In addition to her affiliation with the W.C.T.U., she had been a member of the Springfield Ministerial Alliance and of St. Paul Methodist Church.

== Death ==
Suffering from a heart condition for a decade, Nelle G. Burger died December 24, 1957, at Burge Hospital in Springfield, Missouri.
