= Artur Burger =

Austrian pharmacist and pharmacognosist

Artur Burger (6 June 1943 – 23 September 2000) was an Austrian pharmacist, and pharmacognosist. He taught pharmacognosy at the University of Innsbruck and published more than 100 papers on polymorphism in drugs.
