= Tina Berger =

Austrian politician (born 1981)

Member of the National Council
- Incumbent
- Assumed office 24 October 2024
- Constituency: Carinthia West

Personal details
- Born: 7 September 1981 (age 44)
- Party: Freedom Party

Tina Angela Berger (born 7 September 1981) is an Austrian politician of the Freedom Party. She was elected member of the National Council in the 2024 legislative election, and previously served as a municipal councillor of Lendorf.
