= Ida Burger =

American dance hall girl and prostitute

Ida Burger, known in the underworld of New York as Ida The Goose, was a popular American dance hall girl and a prostitute during the turn of the century. She was the subject of a major gang war between members of the Gopher Gang and saloonkeeper Chick Tricker's faction of the Eastman Gang.

== Ida the Goose War ==
After being lured away from Hell's Kitchen by a member of Tricker's gang, she performed as the belle of the Cafe Maryland and refused the Gophers' demands to leave her newfound West 28th Street home.

Allowing the matter to be settled between the Gophers and his own underlings, four men entered the Cafe Maryland in October 1910. After drinking for several minutes, Burger protested their presence and the four gunmen opened fire on the six rival gang members seriously wounding five of them. Burger's lover, hiding behind the bar with two bartenders, was forced to come out and face the Gophers. Burger, apparently disillusioned by his cowardice, allegedly shoved him out into the open and supposedly said "Say youse! Come out and take it." With the lone gangster on his knees, each of the four Gophers fired a bullet into his head before returning with Burger to Hell's Kitchen.

== Later years ==
In March 1910, she was convicted of aiding and abetting of Alexander Devoe, who had escaped from Sing Sing Prison while serving a life sentence for the murder of police informant Lefty Boyle, and was held at Sing Sing Prison with bail set at $1,500.

== In popular culture ==
- She may have been the basis for the character of the same name in the 2001 novel Gangster by Lorenzo Carcaterra.
