= Harriet Berger =

American political scientist

- Died: May 4, 2012; East Falls, Philadelphia
- Education: Wellesley College; University of Pennsylvania
- Scientific career
- Fields: Political science
- Workplaces: Drexel University
- Doctoral advisor: Henry J. Abraham

Harriet Fleisher Berger (died May 4, 2012) was an American political scientist. She was a professor of History and Politics at Drexel University from 1967 to 1988. She specialized in the study of collective bargaining, union activism, and constitutional law in the United States. She was the first woman to obtain a PhD in political science from the University of Pennsylvania, the first woman to be hired as a full-time political scientist at Drexel University, and the first full-time political scientist to receive tenure at Drexel.

== Life and career ==
Berger was born in Philadelphia, and attended Cheltenham High School, graduating in 1934. She then attended Wellesley College, where she completed her bachelor's degree in 1938. Graduating in the midst of the New Deal, she went to work for the International Ladies' Garment Workers' Union. She worked there for more than two decades, during which time she was the chief researcher for Elden LaMar's book The clothing workers of Philadelphia: History of their struggles for union and security.

During World War II, Berger and her husband lived in California. There she became one of the early members and activists of the Sierra Club of California, before it had become a national organization. In the 1950s, after moving to East Falls, Philadelphia, Berger joined the East Falls Community Council, and spent about three decades as a Democratic committeewoman in Philadelphia. In addition to her labour activism and political activity in the United States, she was also active as a supporter of the Jamaican prime ministers Norman Manley and Michael Manley.

In the 1950s and 1960s Berger attended the University of Pennsylvania, where in 1958 she obtained an M.A. degree in political science, with the dissertation The grievance process in the Philadelphia public service: A problem in public personnel policy. In 1967 Berger completed a doctorate on collective bargaining, and continued her research on grievance filing in the Pennsylvania public service. Berger's PhD dissertation was entitled Exclusive recognition of employee organizations in the public service: Federal agencies in Philadelphia and the City of Philadelphia. She was the first woman to earn a doctorate in political science from the University of Pennsylvania. Her dissertation was supervised by Henry J. Abraham, and she also studied constitutional law. In 1967 she joined the political science faculty at Drexel University, making her the first woman to be a full-time political scientist at Drexel. As well, her tenure in 1972 made her the first full-time political scientist to be tenured at Drexel.

Berger was married to the Philadelphia city solicitor David Berger, who worked in the administration of mayor Richardson Dilworth during the 1950s and 1960s. She had two children. Berger retired in 1988, and after her retirement she studied painting at Pennsylvania Academy of the Fine Arts. Berger died on May 4, 2015.
