= Cheeseburger (disambiguation) =

A cheeseburger is a hamburger topped with cheese.

Cheeseburger may also refer to:

- Cheeseburger (band), an American hard rock band
  - Cheeseburger (album), their 2007 album
- Cheeseburger (wrestler), or World Famous CB, American professional wrestler
- OnePlus 5, codenamed cheeseburger, a smartphone
- "Cheeseburger", a song by Gang of Four from Solid Gold
- Cheezburger, Inc., an internet media company
