= Albert Bürger (firefighter) =

- Born: 13 June 1913
- Died: 16 March 1996 (aged 82)
- Occupation: Firefighter
- Awards: Knight's Cross of the Iron Cross

Albert Bürger (13 June 1913 – 16 March 1996) was a fire official in West Germany. During World War II, he served in the Luftwaffe and was a recipient of the Knight's Cross of the Iron Cross.

== Awards ==
- Knight's Cross of the Iron Cross on 17 April 1945 as Oberleutnant of the Reserves in the staff of the 4th Flak Division.
- Order of Merit of the Federal Republic of Germany (Verdienstorden der Bundesrepublik Deutschland)
  - Merit Cross 1st Class (Bundesverdienstkreuz 1. Klasse) (31 May 1953)
  - Grand Merit Cross (Großes Bundesverdienstkreuz) (17 June 1970)
  - Grand Merit Cross with Star (Großes Bundesverdienstkreuz mit Stern) (13 June 1978)
  - Grand Merit Cross with Star and Sash (Großes Bundesverdienstkreuz mit Stern und Schulterband') (24 July 1981)
