= Burgers (surname) =

Burgers is a Dutch surname. It means "citizen's", but the name is also (or even primarily) of patronymic origin, with the Germanic given name Burger related to Burchard. Notable people with the surname include:

- Don Burgers (1932–2006), Dutch politician.
- Jan Burgers (1895–1981), Dutch physicist.
- Jean Burgers (1917–1944), Belgian World War II resistance fighter.
- Johan Burgers (1870–1943), Dutch zoologist, founder of Royal Burgers' Zoo in Arnhem
- Joop Burgers (born 1940), Dutch football midfielder.
- Nathan Burgers (born 1979), Australian field hockey goalkeeper.
- Piet Burgers (1932–2015), Dutch football striker.
- Phil Burgers, American-Australian comedian.
- Thomas François Burgers (1834–1881), Afrikaner politician, president of the Transvaal Republic.
- Willie Burgers (1897–1988), Dutch physicist, brother of Jan.

== Fictional Characters ==
- Alison Burgers, a character from The Dictator

== See also ==
- Burger (surname)
- Burgher (disambiguation) § People with the surname
- Bürger
