= Burger Creek =

Stream in the American state of Missouri

Coordinates: 38°34′47″N 92°32′15″W

Burger Creek (also spelled Berger Branch) is a stream in Moniteau County in the U.S. state of Missouri. It is a tributary of North Moreau Creek.

The stream headwaters arise just northeast of US Route 50 about two miles east of California at and the stream flows west passing under Route 50 then flows south to its confluence with the North Moreau at .

Burger Creek has the name of Frank Berger, the original owner of the site.
