= Berger (disambiguation) =

Berger is a surname.

Berger or Bergers may also refer to:

- Berger, Missouri
- Berger's disease, or IgA Nephropathy (IgAN), a form of kidney disease
- Berger Cookies, made by DeBaufre Bakeries in Baltimore, MD
- Berger (grape), another name for the California/French wine grape Burger
- Bergers, original French title of Shepherds (film)
