= Werner Burger (numismatist) =

German numismatist (1936–2021)

Werner Burger (Chinese name: 布威纳 Bu Weina; 1936 – 15 November 2021) was a German numismatist specialising in Chinese coins of the Qing dynasty (1644–1911). He wrote the first PhD on Chinese numismatics.

== Life ==
Burger was born in Munich, Bavaria, Germany, in 1936. He studied Chinese at Ludwig-Maximilians-Universität München (LMU), graduating in 1962. He went to China in 1963 to teach German in Shanghai. When the school he was teaching at closed down, he was sent to be a sheep farmer. He then moved to Hong Kong to research Chinese numismatics. He died in Hong Kong on 15 November 2021.

== Publications ==
- "Manchu Inscriptions on Chinese Cash Coins", in The American Numismatic Society Museum Notes XI (1964)
- "Um Amuleto em Manchu", in Boletim do Instituto Luís de Camões (1969)
- "Minting during the Qianlong Period: Comparing the Actual Coins with the Mint Reports", in Christine Moll-Murata, Song Jianze and Hans Ulrich Vogel (eds.), Chinese Handicraft Regulations of the Qing Dynasty (2005)
- Chinese section of Coins of the World 1750-1850, by W.D. Craig (1976)
- Ch’ing cash until 1735, Mei Ya Publications, Taipei, 1976
- Ch’ing Cash, University Museum and Art Gallery, The University of Hong Kong, 2016.
