= Jan Bürger =

German footballer (born 2007)

Personal information
- Date of birth: 10 March 2007 (age 19)
- Place of birth: Helmstedt, Germany
- Height: 1.80 m (5 ft 11 in)
- Position: Right-back

Team information
- Current team: PEC Zwolle
- Number: 6

Youth career
- 2012–2017: TSVG Helmstedt
- 2017–2025: VfL Wolfsburg

Senior career*
Years	Team	Apps	(Gls)
2025–2026	VfL Wolfsburg	6	(0)
2026–	PEC Zwolle	0	(0)

International career^{‡}
2022	Germany U15	2	(0)
2022–2023	Germany U16	5	(0)
2023	Germany U17	4	(0)
2026–	Germany U19	4	(0)
- * Club domestic league appearances and goals as of 16 August 2026 ‡ National team caps and goals as of 27 May 2026

Jan Bürger (born 10 March 2007) is a German professional footballer who plays as a right-back for Eredivisie club PEC Zwolle.

== Club career ==
A youth product of VfL Wolfsburg since he was an U11, Bürger signed his first professional contract with the club on 9 June 2023. On 22 November 2025, he made his professional debut, as a substitute during a 3–1 loss to Bayer Leverkusen, on 22 November 2025.

On 14 August 2026, Bürger moved to PEC Zwolle in the Netherlands on a three-year deal.

== International career ==
Bürger is a youth international for Germany, having played up to the Germany U17s.

== Career statistics ==
As of match played 21 February 2026

Appearances and goals by club, season and competition
Club	Season	League			Cup		Other		Total	
Club	Season	Division	Apps	Goals	Apps	Goals	Apps	Goals	Apps	Goals
VfL Wolfsburg	2025–26	Bundesliga	6	0	—		—		6	0
Career total			6	0	0	0	0	0	6	0
