= Peter B. Berger =

American cardiologist

Peter B. Berger (born 1956) is the Senior Vice President of Clinical Research for Northwell Health. He is also a Professor of Cardiology and of Medicine in the Hofstra North Shore - LIJ School of Medicine. Berger practices interventional cardiology at North Shore Hospital.

Previously, Berger was the system-wide Chairman of Cardiology in the Geisinger Health System and Co-Director of the Geisinger Heart & Vascular Institute. Prior to assuming that position, he was the Associate Chief Research Officer at Geisinger Clinic and Director of the Center for Clinical Studies. He was also an interventional cardiologist at Geisinger.

Before joining Geisinger in July 2006, Berger was a Professor of Medicine and the Director of Interventional Cardiology at the Duke University Medical Center. From 1990 to 2004, Berger worked at the Mayo Clinic College of Medicine as a Professor of Medicine in the Division of Cardiology. He has served on and chaired the American Heart Association Committee on Diagnostic and Interventional Catheterization, as well as served on the American College of Cardiology and Society of Coronary Angiography and Intervention's Cardiac Catheterization and Interventional Cardiology Committees.

Berger has served on the steering committees of many of the cardiology trials that have shaped clinical practice in the last 20 years. Berger has authored more than 300 original articles and 21 editorials, co-authored 5 Guideline documents and edited many others, published 42 commentaries on clinical trials (many as the former Director of Clinical Trials for MD Consult), authored or co-authored 17 book chapters, edited 2 books, authored 11 invited publications, developed 10 educational tapes, and given hundreds of educational lectures in the US and abroad. He has served on the editorial boards of more than a dozen journals.

During his time at Duke, Berger hosted a nationally televised cath lab conference that was seen live via the GE TiP-TV hospital network or online each week by as many as 5000 viewers.

In July 2009, Berger was featured on CNN as part of an examination of Geisinger's unique healthcare plan.

Berger was born in Queens, New York. He received his medical degree from NYU Medical School and did his residency and fellowship at Boston City Hospital and Boston University Medical Center. His wife, Nina Charnoff, is a pediatric anesthesiologist.
