= Johann Burger =

Swiss engraver (1829–1912)

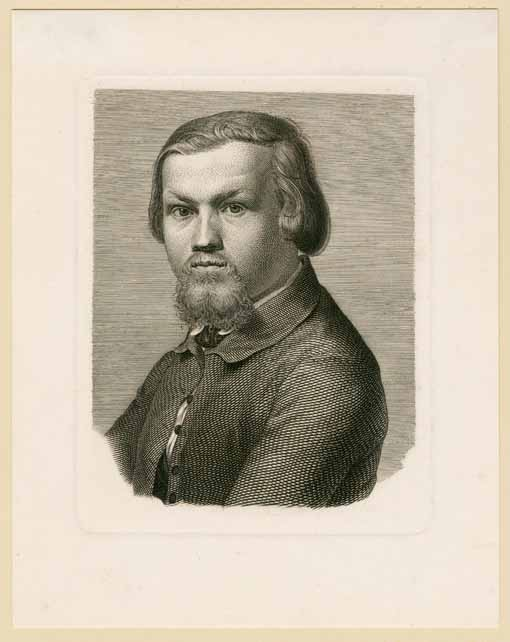
- Self-portrait
- Born: 31 May 1829
- Died: 2 May 1912 (aged 82); Munich

Johann Burger (born 31 May 1829 – 2 May 1912) was a Swiss engraver.

Burger was born in Burg, Aargau. He was a pupil of landscape painter and engraver Jakob Suter at Zofingen, and from 1850 to 1856 of reproduction engraver Julius Thäter at the Munich Academy, and engraved as his first plate "The Stoning of Saint Stephen", after Schraudolph. His further works include "Lady Macbeth" (1858), after Cornelius; three plates illustrating scenes from the life of Saint Boniface, after Hess; and "Aurora" (1887), after Guido Reni.

He died in Munich.
