= Burger Branch =

Stream in McMinn and Monroe County, Tennessee, U.S.

Coordinates: 35.4170185°N 84.4807619°W

Burger Branch is a stream in McMinn County and Monroe County, Tennessee, in the United States.

Burger Branch was named for the Burger family of pioneers who settled at the creek in the 1830s.

== See also ==
- List of rivers of Tennessee
