= Burger (given name) =

Burger may be a given name. Notable people with the name include:

- Burger M. Engebretson, American politician
- Burger Geldenhuys, South African rugby union player
- Burger Lambrechts (born 1973), South African shot putter
- Burger Odendaal, South African rugby union player
