= Burger Point =

Cape in Alaska, United States

Coordinates: 58°12′30″N 135°35′00″W

Burger Point is a cape in Hoonah–Angoon Census Area, Alaska, in the United States. The name Burger Point was recorded by the United States Geological Survey in 1926.
