= Henry Berger =

American organ builder (1826–1864)

Henry Berger (1826 - July 24, 1864) was an American prolific organ builder. He was based in Baltimore, Maryland.

== Early life ==
A native of Prussia, Henry Berger was in business with Anton Dressel in Hollfeld, Bavaria and then had his own business in Bamberg, Bavaria by 1843.

== Baltimore Organ Builder ==
Berger immigrated in 1849 to Baltimore, Maryland, in the United States and established his own organ building firm. Setting up a shop on the second floor of #75 E Baltimore street, Baltimore, Maryland.

The firm's first major contract was to rebuild and enlarge the organ for Trinity German Lutheran Church, then located in the old Trinity Episcopal building at Trinity and High streets, Fells Point, Baltimore.

By 1850 he had built several organs, most of which were small one and two manual affairs with an interesting mix of mid 19th century German design integrated with the prevailing English standards. While Berger and his workforce may have possessed the skills to make metal pipes, the equipment, facilities, and time required to establish a metal making pipe shop were not feasible. It is more likely that he secured his metal pipes from Philadelphia. However, there was an abundance of pine lumber in the region, and many suppliers, and so Berger's workers would have been able to fabricate the wood pipes required.

Berger was said to be a born showman, and local newspapers heaped much praise and press on his operations and instruments. During his seven short years in Baltimore, the Sun Paper alone featured Henry and his works about a thirty times. In 1851, one effusive Sun paper article, said that Berger had a workforce of 20, that his shop, now on Frederick Street, was 100 feet deep, four stories tall and had an erecting room of 25 feet tall.

== Life in Pennsylvania ==
In 1855 Henry moved his family to Jefferson, York Country, Pennsylvania, a small village on the outskirts of York. Here he was postmaster. His brother, George, was left behind to continue the pipe organ business and to finish contracts in the works. A short time later George followed Henry to Pennsylvania.

The family moved to York, Pennsylvania in 1859, where Henry became the organist at St. Mary's and once again set up an organ building shop. After an 1861 fire in the shop, Berger moved to Tiffin, Pennsylvania, where he became the organist of St. Mary's Catholic church. He built a new organ for this church. In 1862 Henry died, and a notice of eviction and sale of Berger's property was posted in a Tiffin city newspaper.

== Musical Impresario ==
Berger and his wife, Anna, had six children (three girls and three boys). From a very early age the children showed musical prowess, so much so that Henry would tour them around the country and even signed them on as members of an extant touring bell choir. By the late 1850s and 60s the child prodigies were playing musical instruments and singing in the great music halls of the United States and England.

== Opus List ==
Though the Berger opus list is large, only a few of his instruments survive. These include a handsome one manual instrument organ in the Episcopal church, Fork, Virginia (not "Little Fork"), which contains at least some pipes marked by a Berger voicer.

The case of his magnum opus, a three manual organ, for St. Augustine Catholic Church, Philadelphia, exists, though it now houses a newer organ. In the Baltimore area, the one manual instrument in Old Salem Lutheran Church, Catonsville, Maryland, still survives.

This list was compiled from various sources, primarily newspaper reports of the day. It is not complete and new attributions continue to surface.

- Ascension Episcopal, Baltimore, Maryland (1852)
- Carroll Chapel, Montgomery County, Maryland (1854)
- Charles Street Methodist, Baltimore, Maryland (1853)
- Doughoregan Manor, Ellicott City, Maryland (1854)
- Fork Episcopal, Doswell, Virginia (1854)
- Georgetown College, Washington DC (1851)
- German Lutheran, Cumberland, Maryland
- Holy Trinity Catholic Georgetown, Washington DC (1850)
- Immaculate Conception Catholic, Baltimore, Maryland (1854)
- Lutheran Church, Cumberland, Maryland (1851)
- Our Lady of Assumption Church, Arichat, Nova Scotia (1858)
- Sacred Heart of Mary, Adams County, Pennsylvania (1854)
- Second English Lutheran, Baltimore, Maryland (1854)
- Second Reformed, Philadelphia, Pennsylvania (1854)
- Sherwood Episcopal, Cockeysville, Maryland (1854)
- St. Augustine Catholic, Philadelphia (1852)
- St. Charles Catholic, Pikesville, Maryland (1852)
- St. James Episcopal, Monkton (1855)
- St. Joseph Catholic, Baltimore, Maryland (1852)
- St. Luke's Episcopal, Baltimore, Maryland, (1854)
- St. Matthew's Catholic, Washington DC (1854)
- St. Matthew's Lutheran, Baltimore, Maryland
- St. Paul's Cathedral, Pittsburgh (1852)
- St. Peter & St. Paul, Philadelphia Pennsylvania)
- St. Peter's Catholic, Portsmouth VA (1852)
- St. Peter's Episcopal, Pittsburgh, Pennsylvania (1852)
- St. Peter's pro-Cathedral, Richmond Virginia (1852)
- St. Timothy Episcopal, Catonsville, Maryland (1850)
- St. Vincent de Paul, Baltimore, Maryland, (1852)
- Trinity Episcopal, Pittsburgh Pennsylvania (1852)
- Trinity German Lutheran, Baltimore, Maryland (1849)
- US Naval Academy Chapel, Annapolis, Maryland (1854)
- Zion Lutheran, Baltimore, Maryland (1850)
- Other Catholic Churches in: Trenton, New Jersey; Bedford, Pennsylvania (1851); Eldorado, Arkansas (1851); Gettysburg, Pennsylvania (1853); Blackstone, Massachusetts (1852); Cumberland, Maryland (1853); Harmon's Bottom (New Baltimore), Pennsylvania (1851); Harrisburg, Pennsylvania (1854); Troy, New York (1852); Bel Air, Maryland (1851); Lynchburg, Virginia (1854); Millerstown (now Fairfield), Adams County, Pennsylvania (1854) and Thibodaux, Louisiana (1851).
- Other churches in: San Francisco, California (1851); New Brighton, Pennsylvania (1852); Princess Anne, Maryland (1851); Prince George's County, Maryland (1854); Frederick, Maryland (1850); New York City (1851) and a private residence, Baltimore, Maryland (1851).
