= Malcolm Burger =

British flying ace

Malcolm Graham Stewart Burger
- Born: 14 September 1894; Graaff-Reinet, Cape Colony
- Died: after 1958
- Military career
- Allegiance: United Kingdom
- Branch: Royal Air Force
- Rank: Lieutenant
- Unit: No. 54 Squadron RAF
- Awards: Distinguished Flying Cross

Lieutenant Malcolm Graham Stewart Burger (14 September 1894 – after 1958) was a World War I flying ace credited with five victories. He became an acting Captain in November 1918, and remained in the Royal Air Force after the end of the war.

== Honours and awards ==
- Distinguished Flying Cross (DFC)
- Lieut. (A./Capt.) Malcolm Graham Stewart Burger. (FRANCE)
- "During the last battles this officer displayed marked gallantry and devotion to duty on low-flying bombing patrols, inflicting heavy casualties on numerous occasions. He has destroyed three enemy machines, and forced another to land." Supplement to the London Gazette, 8 February 1919 (31170/2036)
