= Jan Johannis Adriaan Berger =

Dutch politician

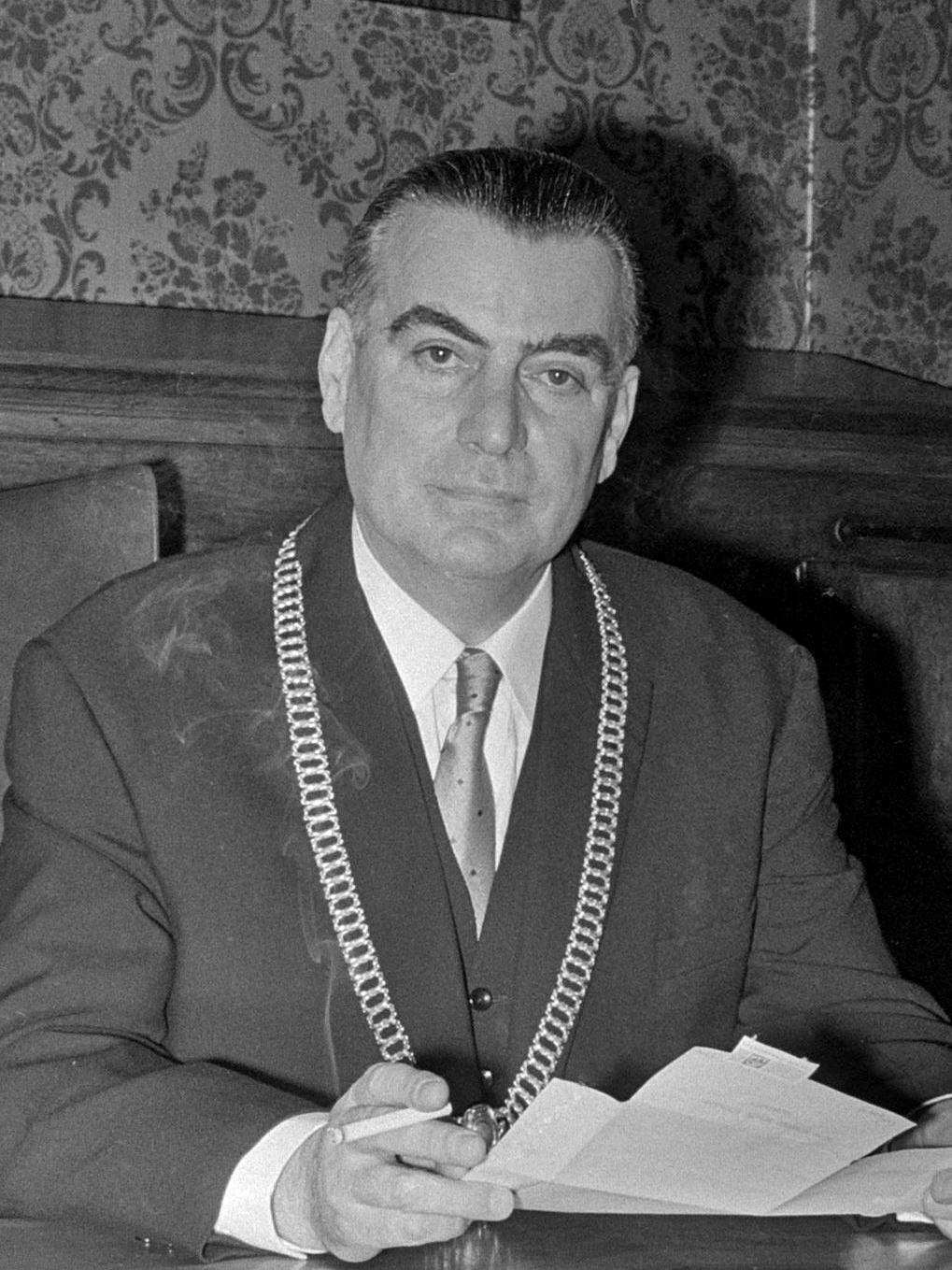
Berger as mayor

Jan Johannis Adriaan Berger (18 September 1918 – 6 September 1978) was a Dutch politician. During WWII he hid people who were supposed to be shipped off to Germany as forced labourers. In 1946 he became a member of the Labour Party. On 15 July 1952 he became a member of the lower house. As member of the lower house he represented his party in matters of social security. He spent much effort on the creation and passing of the Algemene Ouderdomswet. The minister of social security and health care even proposed to name the bill after Berger but he refused as he feared this would alienate its Christian supporters. On 21 September 1954 Berger left the lower house. On 20 March 1959 Berger returned to the lower house, he also was a member of the party leadership in this period. He was approached for the position of parliamentary leader but refused the job. From on 1961 Berger represented the interest of the North Netherlands. On 3 July 1962 he became a member for the states-provincial, representing Groningen, he was immediately made parliamentary leader. On 1 June 1965 Berger became mayor of Groningen. On 11 May 1971 he became a member of the lower house for the third and final time, this time for DS’70, permanently leaving on 1 April 1975. He died on 6 September 1978.

Berger was married to Willy Maliepaard, this union produced two sons and a daughter.
