= Alex Burger (screenwriter) =

American playwright and screenwriter

Alexander F. Burger
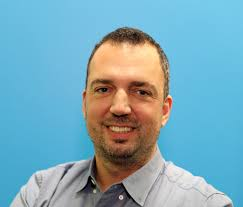
- Born: Wenham, Massachusetts, U.S.
- Education: Harvard University (A.B. magna cum laude the Comparative study of Religion); INSEAD (MBA)
- Occupations: Playwright; screenwriter
- Writing career
- Notable work: The Cry of Winnie Mandela (2024–2026)

Alex Burger is an American playwright and screenwriter, based in Los Angeles. He is known for serving as the head writer for Seasons 3 and 4 of Umlilo (Zulu for “The Fire”), the SAFTA Award-winning South African drama and for adapting Njabulo Ndebele's novel The Cry of Winnie Mandela for the stage..

== Writing career ==
Burger began his career as a poet and later transitioned into playwriting. In 2012, his play Whose Blood: A Tale of Desire and Despair Set in a 19th Century Operating Theatre was staged at London's Old Operating Theatre. The production was later referenced in Wellcome Trust Magazine and featured in the book Challenging History in the Museum. His other works include Mashoga (My Wife), presented at the Glasgow Any Objections Festival in 2013, The Inkanyamba, performed at Market Theatre Lab in 2015, and Fees Must Fall, staged at Wits University in 2016.

In 2019, Burger was the head writer for the South African Afrikaans drama Die Testament (Seasons 1 and 2), which was released on Network24 in September of that year.

In 2024, Burger adapted Njabulo S. Ndebele's novel The Cry of Winnie Mandela for the stage. The production premiered at the Market Theatre in Johannesburg from 30 March to 21 April 2024, returned to the Market Theatre from 26 February to 30 March 2025, transferred to the Baxter Flipside in Cape Town from 29 January to 15 February 2025, and was later staged at the Playhouse Company's Drama Theatre in Durban on 9 August 2025. In 2026, the production was featured in the National Arts Festival programme and returned to the Market Theatre for a limited run from 8 to 12 July 2026.

== Activist career ==
Burger has collaborated with the International Finance Corporation (IFC), the private sector arm of the World Bank.

== Filmography ==
=== Television series ===
Year	Show	Role	Season	Notes
2016	Umlilo	Head writer	3	13 episodes
2016	Umlilo	Head writer	4	13 episodes
2016	Doubt	Storyline	1	13 episodes
2016	Hard Copy	Storyline	4	13 episodes
2016 - 2017	90 Plein Street	Story	5	13 episodes
2018 - 2019	Isthembiso	Story consultant	1	Episode 1 - 208
2019	Die Testament	Head writer	1	Episode 1 - 64
2022	Die Testament	Head writer	2	Episode 1 - 48

=== Plays ===
==== Writer ====
Year	Title	Role	Notes
2010	Ain’t Nothin’ Changed	Writer	Was performed in San Francisco as part of the Playground Theatre
2011	Whose Blood: A Tale of Desire and Despair Set in a 19th Century Operating Theatre	Writer	At London's Old Operating theatre (2012)
2013	Mashoga (My Wife)	Writer	Glasgow Any Objections Festival 2013
2015	The Inkanyamba	Writer	Market Theater Lab
2016	Fees Must Fall	Writer	The University of the Witwatersrand
2024, 2025, 2026	The Cry of Winnie Mandela	Writer (adapted from the novel)	The Market Theatre The Baxter Theatre The Market Theatre The Playhouse Company National Arts Festival Market Theatre

== Writing awards and recognition ==
- 1st Prize Short Fiction Competition Award sponsored by the Times Literary Supplement (UK), 2009
