= Hyalinobatrachium bergeri =

Conservation status
- Least Concern (IUCN 3.1)

Scientific classification
- Kingdom: Animalia
- Phylum: Chordata
- Class: Amphibia
- Order: Anura
- Family: Centrolenidae
- Genus: Hyalinobatrachium
- Species: H. bergeri

Binomial name
- Hyalinobatrachium bergeri (Cannatella, 1980)

Synonyms
- Centrolenella bergeri Cannatella, 1980

Species of frog

Hyalinobatrachium bergeri is a species of frog in the family Centrolenidae. It is found on the Amazonian slopes of Andes between the Santa Cruz Department, Bolivia, and Cusco Region, Peru, at elevations of 300–1,980 m (980–6,500 ft) above sea level.

Its natural habitats are lowland to upland primary and slightly disturbed forests, including could forests. It is an arboreal species associated with streams and edges of large rivers. Localized climate change and chytridiomycosis are potential threats.
