= Jeffrey W. Berger =

American vitreoretinal surgeon and engineer

- Born: 1963
- Died: January 25, 2001; Philadelphia, Pennsylvania
- Education: Princeton University
- Occupation: Physician
- Known for: Quantitative retinal imaging
- Spouse: Karen
- Children: Adina, Tamar, Joseph

Jeffrey W. Berger (1963 – January 25, 2001) was an American vitreoretinal surgeon and engineer.

== Training ==
Jeffrey W. Berger graduated in 1985 from Princeton University with a bachelor's degree in engineering. He received his M.D. and Ph.D. degrees from the University of Pennsylvania in 1992. He completed his ophthalmology residency at the Massachusetts Eye and Ear Infirmary in 1996 and a fellowship in vitreoretinal disease at the Scheie Eye Institute of the University of Pennsylvania. He was on the faculty of the Scheie Eye Institute at the time of his death in 2001.

== Career ==
Berger was a pioneer of quantitative retinal imaging with a number of publications on image analysis methods for modalities such as fluorescein angiography. He recognized the value of objective analysis of digital fundus images for research and clinical practice. He developed a system for evaluating and standardizing images in clinical trials and was a principal investigator for the NEI-funded Complications of AMD Prevention Trial (CAPT). He was an expert on laser tissue interactions and worked on eye tracking laser systems. Berger was also Chief of the Retina Service at the Philadelphia VA Medical Center.

== Death ==
Berger was diagnosed with gastric adenocarcinoma on January 12, 2001, after a week-long illness and died less than 2 weeks later on January 25, 2001. He was married to Karen and they had three children.

== Legacy ==
Berger became a pioneer in his field and laid the groundwork for so many subsequent advances in the field of quantitative fundus imaging. Recognizing his commitment to mentoring students in medical research, the Jeffrey W. Berger Research Scholarship Foundation, a 501(c)(3) nonprofit founded in 2003, sponsors the Jeffrey W. Berger Medical Student Research Award at the University of Pennsylvania. The award helps to fund students' research at Penn. The award was renamed the Berger Award for Research at the University of Pennsylvania (BAR-UP) in 2021. Additionally, in 2021 the Scheie Hadassah InterNational Exchange (SHINE) Program was introduced to provide opportunities for students at Scheie to do research at Hadassah Hospital in Jerusalem and students at Hadassah to do research at Scheie.

== Publications ==
- Ying GS, Maguire MG, Liu C, Antoszyk AN; Complications of Age-related Macular Degeneration Prevention Trial Research Group. Night Vision Symptoms and Progression of Age-related Macular Degeneration in the Complications of Age-related Macular Degeneration Prevention Trial. Ophthalmology. 2008 Jul 30. [Epub ahead of print]
- Complications of Age-related Macular Degeneration Prevention Trial (CAPT) Research Group. Risk factors for choroidal neovascularization and geographic atrophy in the complications of age-related macular degeneration prevention trial. Ophthalmology. 2008 Sep;115(9):1474-9, 1479.e1-6. Epub 2008 May 27.
- Maguire MG, Alexander J, Fine SL; Complications of Age-related Macular Degeneration Prevention Trial (CAPT) Research Group. Characteristics of choroidal neovascularization in the complications of age-related macular degeneration prevention trial. Ophthalmology. 2008 Sep;115(9):1468-73, 1473.e1-2. Epub 2008 May 16.
- Kaiser RS, Berger JW, Williams GA, Tolentino MJ, Maguire AM, Alexander J, Madjarov B, Margherio RM. Variability in fluorescein angiography interpretation for photodynamic therapy in age-related macular degeneration. Retina. 2002 Dec;22(6):683-90.
- Berger JW, Madjarov B. Augmented reality fundus biomicroscopy: a working clinical prototype. Arch Ophthalmol. 2001 Dec;119(12):1815-8.
- Fine SL. Jeffrey W. Berger, MD, PhD (1963–2001). Arch Ophthalmol. 2001;119(12):1870.
- Kaiser RS, Berger JW, Maguire MG, Ho AC, Javornik NB; Choroidal Neovascularization Prevention Trial Study Group. Laser burn intensity and the risk for choroidal neovascularization in the CNVPT Fellow Eye Study. Arch Ophthalmol. 2001 Jun;119(6):826-32.
- Asmuth J, Madjarov B, Sajda P, Berger JW. Mosaicking and enhancement of slit lamp biomicroscopic fundus images. Br J Ophthalmol. 2001 May;85(5):563-5.
- Berger JW, Yoken J. Computer-assisted quantitation of choroidal neovascularization for clinical trials. Invest Ophthalmol Vis Sci. 2000 Jul;41(8):2286-95.
- Berger JW, Patel TR, Shin DS, Piltz JR, Stone RA. Computerized stereochronoscopy and alternation flicker to detect optic nerve head contour change. Ophthalmology. 2000 Jul;107(7):1316-20.
- Lee MS, Shin DS, Berger JW. Grading, image analysis, and stereopsis of digitally compressed fundus images. Retina. 2000;20(3):275-81.
- Berger JW. Wavelength considerations for laser prophylaxis in AMD. Ophthalmology. 2000 Jun;107(6):1019-21.
- Madjarov BD, Berger JW. Automated, real time extraction of fundus images from slit lamp fundus biomicroscope video image sequences. Br J Ophthalmol. 2000 Jun;84(6):645-7.
- Fine SL, Berger JW, Maguire MG, Ho AC. Age-related macular degeneration. N Engl J Med. 2000 Feb 17;342(7):483-92.
- Hariprasad R, Shin DS, Berger JW. An intelligent, interactive platform for ophthalmic teaching, telemedicine, and telecollaboration: design considerations and prototype construction. Stud Health Technol Inform. 1999;62:124-9.
- Berger JW, Shin DS. Computer-vision-enabled augmented reality fundus biomicroscopy. Ophthalmology. 1999 Oct;106(10):1935-41.
- Shin DS, Javornik NB, Berger JW. Computer-assisted, interactive fundus image processing for macular drusen quantitation. Ophthalmology. 1999 Jun;106(6):1119-25.
- Berger JW. Quantitative image sequence analysis of fundus fluorescein angiography. Ophthalmic Surg Lasers. 1999 Jan;30(1):72-3.
- Shin DS, Kaiser RS, Lee MS, Berger JW. Fundus image change analysis: Geometric and radiometric normalization. Proc SPIE 1999;3591:129-136.
- Fine SL, Berger JW, Maguire MG, eds. Age-related macular degeneration. St. Louis: Mosby, 1999
- Berger JW. Erbium-YAG laser ablation: the myth of 1-micron penetration. Arch Ophthalmol. 1998 Jun;116(6):830-1.
- Berger JW. Quantitative, spatio-temporal image analysis of fluorescein angiography in age-related macular degeneration. Proc SPIE 1998;3246:48-53.
- Berger JW, Brucker AJ. The magnitude of the bubble buoyant pressure: implications for macular hole surgery. Retina. 1998;18(1):84-6; author reply 86–8.
- Berger JW, D'Amico DJ. Modeling of erbium: YAG laser-mediated explosive photovaporization: implications for vitreoretinal surgery. Ophthalmic Surg Lasers. 1997 Feb;28(2):133-9.
- Berger JW, Leventon ME, Hata N, et al. Design considerations for a computer-vision-enabled ophthalmic augmented reality environment. Lecture Notes in Computer Science 1997;1205:399-408.
- Berger JW. Thermal modelling of micropulsed diode laser retinal photocoagulation. Lasers Surg Med. 1997;20(4):409-15.
- Berger JW, Talamo JH, LaMarche KJ, Kim SH, Snyder RW, D'Amico DJ, Marcellino G. Temperature measurements during phacoemulsification and erbium:YAG laser phacoablation in model systems. J Cataract Refract Surg. 1996 Apr;22(3):372-8.
- Berger JW, Bochow TW, Talamo JH, D'Amico DJ. Measurement and modeling of thermal transients during Er:YAG laser irradiation of vitreous. Lasers Surg Med. 1996;19(4):388-96.
- Berger JW, Rubin PA, Jakobiec FA. Pediatric orbital pseudotumor: case report and review of the literature. Int Ophthalmol Clin. 1996 Winter;36(1):161-77.
- Berger JW. Laser energy and dye fluorescence transmission through blood in vitro. Am J Ophthalmol. 1995 Sep;120(3):404-5.
- Berger JW, Vanderkooi JM. The anaerobic photolysis of lens alpha-crystallin: evidence for triplet state mediated photodamage. Photochem Photobiol. 1990 Oct;52(4):855-60.
- Vanderkooi JM, Berger JW. Excited triplet states used to study biological macromolecules at room temperature. Biochim Biophys Acta. 1989 Aug 17;976(1):1-27.
- Berger JW, Vanderkooi JM. Characterization of lens alpha-crystallin tryptophan microenvironments by room temperature phosphorescence spectroscopy. Biochemistry. 1989 Jun 27;28(13):5501-8.
- Berger JW, Vanderkooi JM, Tallmadge DH, Borkman RF. Phosphorescence measurements of calf gamma-II, III, and IV crystallins at 77 and 293 K. Exp Eye Res. 1989 May;48(5):627-39.
- Berger JW, Vanderkooi JM. Brownian dynamics simulations of intramolecular energy transfer. Biophys Chem. 1988 Jul 15;30(3):257-69.
