= Herman Carel Burger =

Dutch physicist (1893–1965)

Herman Carel Burger (1 June 1893 – 28 December 1965) was a Dutch physicist who pioneered the field of electrocardiography and medical physics. A system of positioning of electrodes for electrocardiography is known as Burger's triangle.

Burger was born in Utrecht and was interested in both physics and medicine. He received a PhD in 1918 from Utrecht University with studies on crystal formation and then went to work at Philips in Eindhoven. He also continued to work at Utrecht University and became a reader in 1927 and began to teach physics to students of medicine. After World War II he began to take an interest in electricity and the human body. He chose a triangle of points for electrical measurement which formed an asymmetric triangle, the so-called Burger's triangle, which departed from the previous idea of Willem Einthoven which was an equilateral triangle. He also pioneered the use of dyes in blood to study circulation.

Burger died of a heart infarction, a year after the death of his wife. He willed his body away for science.
