= Burger (grape) =

Variety of grape

- Grape (Vitis)
- Color of berry skin: Blanc
- Species: Vitis vinifera
- Also called: Monbadon and other synonyms
- Origin: France
- Notable regions: California

Burger is a white wine grape of French origin, today planted primarily in the Central Valley. Its French name is Monbadon.

In the early history of Californian wine, Burger was a majority variety but its influence has steadily decreased and now it is used primarily in bulk jug wine production.

== Synonyms ==
Burger is also known as Aouba, Auba, Berger, Blanc de Cadillac, Cadillac, Caoba, Castillone à Montendre, Frontignan, Frontignan des Charentes, Grand Blanc, Gros Montils, Meslier d'Orleans, Monbadon, Slao, and Ugni de Montpellier.
