= Burgher =

Burgher may refer to:

- Burgher (social class), a medieval, early modern European title of a citizen of a town, and a social class from which city officials could be drawn
  - Burgess (title), a resident of a burgh in northern Britain
  - Grand Burgher, a specific conferred or inherited title of medieval German origin
  - Burgher (Boer republics), an enfranchised citizen of the South African Republic or the Orange Free State
- Burgher (Church history), a member of the First Secession Church who subscribed to the Burgher Oath
- Burgher people, an ethnic group that formed during the colonization of Sri Lanka

== People with the surname ==
- Lennox Burgher (born 1946), Jamaican athlete
- Michelle Burgher (born 1977), Jamaican track and field athlete
- Niesha Burgher (born 2002), Jamaican sprinter

== See also ==
- Anti-Burgher, a splinter faction in the history First Secession of the Presbyterian church of Scotland
- Bourgeoisie
- Burger (disambiguation)
