= Deaths in January 2001 =

The following is a list of notable deaths in January 2001.

Entries for each day are listed alphabetically by surname. A typical entry lists information in the following sequence:

- Name, age, country of citizenship at birth, subsequent country of citizenship (if applicable), reason for notability, cause of death (if known), and reference.

== January 2001 ==
=== 1 ===
- Madeleine Barbulée, 90, French actress.
- Sir Michael Hanley, 82, British intelligence officer, Director-General of MI5.
- Fabijan Šovagović, 68, Croatian actor and writer, heart attack.
- John Steadman, 73, American sportswriter, cancer.
- Heriberto Urán, 46, Colombian racing cyclist.
- Ray Walston, 86, American actor (My Favorite Martian, Fast Times at Ridgemont High, Picket Fences), Emmy winner (1995, 1996), lupus.

=== 2 ===
- Sir Ewart Bell, 76, Northern Irish rugby player and civil servant.
- George Carman, 71, English barrister, prostate cancer.
- Ali Sayed Darwish, 23, Emirati cyclist and Olympian (1996), struck by a car.
- William P. Rogers, 87, American politician, diplomat and lawyer, congestive heart failure.
- Alison de Vere, 73, British animator, director.
- Jimmy Zámbó, 42, Hungarian pop singer, accidental gunshot.

=== 3 ===
- George H. Brown, 87, British film producer.
- Kwang-chih Chang, 69–70, Taiwanese-American archaeologist and sinologist, Parkinson's disease.
- Jack Fleming, 77, American sports announcer (Pittsburgh Steelers, Chicago Bulls, West Virginia Mountaineers).
- Kung Fu, 49, Mexican Luchador, arterial hypertension.
- Marty Glickman, 83, American radio announcer, complications from heart bypass surgery.
- John F. Hayes, 85, American politician (Brooklyn Borough President).
- Sushila Nayyar, 86, Indian politician and physician, cardiac arrest.
- Alex Sabo, 90, American baseball player (Washington Senators).

=== 4 ===
- Alexandra Adler, 99, Austrian neurologist, daughter of psychoanalyst Alfred Adler.
- Les Brown, 88, American swing bandleader ("Sentimental Journey"), lung cancer.
- Pierre Leyris, 93, French translator.
- Tadeusz Olechowski, 74, Polish communist politician and diplomat.
- John Rhoden, 82, American sculptor.
- Perry Schwartz, 85, American gridiron football player (Brooklyn Dodgers, New York Yankees).
- Bob Snyder, 87, American football player (Cleveland Rams, Chicago Bears), and coach, complications from diabetes.
- André Thirion, 93, French writer and political activist.
- Villaño I, 50, Mexican professional wrestler, heart attack following a cerebral haemorrhage.

=== 5 ===
- G. E. M. Anscombe, 81, British analytic philosopher, kidney failure.
- Milan Hlavsa, 49, Czech songwriter and bass guitarist (Plastic People of the Universe), lung cancer.
- Phelbert Lawson, 81, American baseball player.
- Raj Kumar Mehra, 82, Indian racing cyclist and Olympian (1948, 1952).
- Nancy Parsons, 58, American actress (Porky's), congestive heart failure.
- James Phiri, 32, Zambian footballer, cancer.
- Geoffrey Virgo, 82, Australian politician.

=== 6 ===
- Victor Braun, 65, Canadian baritone, multiple system atrophy.
- Tokio Fukuda, 85, Japanese Olympic hurdler (1936).
- Nadezhda Grigoryevna Grekova, 90, Soviet/Belarusian politician.
- Peter Lovell-Davis, Baron Lovell-Davis, 76, British publisher and politician.
- Scott Marlowe, 68, American actor (Executive Suite, Murder, She Wrote), heart attack.
- Leo Nowak, 93, American illustrator (Superman).
- Tom Poholsky, 71, American baseball player (St. Louis Cardinals, Chicago Cubs).
- Bob Pratt, 88, Australian rules footballer.
- Tot Pressnell, 94, American baseball player (Brooklyn Dodgers, Chicago Cubs).
- Pretaap Radhakishun, 66, Surinamese politician.

=== 7 ===
- James Carr, 58, American rhythm and blues singer, lung cancer.
- Jenő Csaknády, 76, Hungarian football manager.
- Ken Durrett, 52, American basketball player (Cincinnati Royals / Kansas City-Omaha Kings, Philadelphia 76ers), heart attack.
- Quin Epperly, 87, American racing car constructor.
- František Hájek, 85, Czech Olympic basketball player (1936).
- Charles Helou, 87, Lebanese politician, president (1964-1970), heart attack.
- Johan van der Keuken, 62, Dutch documentary filmmaker, author, and photographer.
- Joseph L. Melnick, 86, American epidemiologist and virologist, complications from Alzheimer's disease.
- Lowell Perry, 69, American gridiron football player and coach, businessman, and broadcaster, cancer.
- Admiral Walker, 102, American baseball player.

=== 8 ===
- Philip A. Barker, 80, British archaeologist.
- Art Brandau, 78, American football player (Pittsburgh Steelers).
- Don Brodie, 96, American actor and director.
- Edwin Etherington, 76, American writer, lawyer, civil rights advocate, and president of the American Stock Exchange.
- Chris Evert, 30, American thoroughbred racehorse, euthanized.
- Bert Hodges, 83, American baseball player (Philadelphia Phillies).
- Alfred Neumann, 91, East German politician.
- Jake Schuehle, 83, American football player (Philadelphia Eagles).
- Néstor Scotta, 52, Argentine football striker, car accident.
- Catherine Storr, 87, English children's writer, suicide.
- Paul Winterton, 92, English journalist and crime novelist.

=== 9 ===
- Paul Vanden Boeynants, 81, Belgian politician, Prime Minister (1966-1968, 1978–1979), pneumonia.
- Peter Düttmann, 77, German World War II Luftwaffe flying ace.
- Judith Trim, 57, English studio potter, breast cancer.
- Carol Voges, 75, Dutch illustrator and comics artist.

=== 10 ===
- Necati Cumalı, 79, Turkish writer and poet, liver cancer.
- John Ditlev-Simonsen, 102, Norwegian sailor and Olympic silver medalist (1936).
- Matthias Duan, 92, Chinese Roman Catholic bishop.
- Bryan Gregory, 49, American rock musician, heart failure.
- G. Lakshmanan, 76, Indian politician.
- Jacques Marin, 81, French actor, heart attack.
- John G. Schmitz, 70, American politician, prostate cancer.
- Muhammad ibn al-Uthaymin, 75, Saudi Salafi scholar, colorectal cancer.
- Esteban Vicente, 97, American painter.

=== 11 ===
- Wanda Jean Allen, 41, American convicted murderer, execution by lethal injection.
- Ken Brown, 55, American professional football player (Cleveland Browns: 1970–1975).
- Emilio Foriscot, 96, Spanish cinematographer.
- Gerald Glatzmayer, 32, Austrian football player, traffic collision.
- Oliver Gurney, 89, British Assyriologist.
- James Hill, 84, American film producer and screenwriter.
- Dorothy M. Horstmann, 89, American epidemiologist, virologist and pediatrician, Alzheimer's disease.
- Álvaro Jordan, 39, Colombian tennis player, severe shock.
- Louis Krages, 51, German racing driver and businessman, suicide by gunshot.
- Denys Lasdun, 86, British architect.
- Ignacy Machowski, 80, Polish actor.
- Claude V. Palisca, 79, American musicologist.
- Victor Pickard, 97, Canadian track and field athlete and Olympian (1924, 1928).
- Princess Vera Constantinovna of Russia, 94, Russian noblewoman and monarchist.
- Lorna Sage, 57, British literary critic and writer, pulmonary emphysema.
- Michael Williams, 65, British actor, lung cancer.

=== 12 ===
- Affirmed, 25, American racehorse, euthanasia after contracting laminitis.
- Gianluigi Bonelli, 92, Italian comic book author and publisher.
- Luiz Bonfá, 78, Brazilian guitarist and composer, prostate cancer.
- József Csermák, 68, Hungarian hammer thrower and Olympic champion (1952, 1956, 1960).
- Adhemar da Silva, 73, Brazilian triple jumper and Olympic champion (1948, 1952, 1956, 1960).
- Bill Hewlett, 87, American co-founder of Hewlett-Packard, heart failure.
- Mariano Juaristi, 96, Spanish Basque pelota player.
- Vladimir Semichastny, 76, Soviet politician, stroke.
- Elizabeth Sewell, 81, British-American critic, poet, and novelist.
- Ibnu Sutowo, 86, Indonesian army officer, politician and businessman.
- Charles Malcolm Watkins, 89, American historian, archaeologist, and curator.

=== 13 ===
- Michael Cuccione, 16, Canadian actor and musician, respiratory failure.
- Bill Fraser, 76, New Zealand politician.
- Stan Freeman, 80, American musician, pulmonary emphysema.
- Arnoldo Pekelharing, 64, Argentine Olympic sailor (1956, 1964).
- Amando de Ossorio Rodríguez, 82, Spanish film director, natural causes.

=== 14 ===
- Luigi Broglio, 89, Italian aerospace engineer.
- Jim Coleman, 89, Canadian sports journalist and writer, heart failure.
- Dennis Fitzgerald, 64, American freestyle wrestler and football player and coach.
- Burkhard Heim, 75, German theoretical physicist.
- George McCabe, 78, English football referee.
- Kostas Rigopoulos, 70, Greek actor, stroke.
- Simone Ruas, 81, French Olympic high jumper (1948).
- Vic Wilson, 69, British racing driver, traffic collision.
- Joe Zapustas, 93, Latvian-American baseball player (Philadelphia Athletics).

=== 15 ===
- Alex Blignaut, 68, South African racing driver and racing team owner, domestic accident.
- Bob Braun, 71, American local television personality and actor (Die Hard 2, Defending Your Life), Parkinson's disease and cancer.
- Bert Corona, 82, American labor and civil rights leader.
- David Lapsley, 76, Scottish footballer.
- Ted Mann, 84, American businessman (Mann Theatres) and film producer (Brubaker, Krull).
- Leo Marks, 80, British World War II cryptographer, cancer.
- Margit Nagy-Sándor, 79, Hungarian gymnast and Olympic silver medalist (1936, 1948).
- Kaija Siren, 80, Finnish architect.
- Riaz ud-Din, 58, Pakistani field hockey player and Olympic champion (1968).

=== 16 ===
- Laurent-Désiré Kabila, 61, Congolese politician and President, shot.
- Richard MacNeish, 82, American archaeologist.
- Melvin McQuaid, 89, Canadian politician.
- Virginia O'Brien, 81, American actress (Lady Be Good, Ship Ahoy, Ziegfeld Follies), natural causes.
- Wanda Piłsudska, 82, Polish psychiatrist.
- Jitendra Prasada, 62, Indian politician and Vice-President of the Indian National Congress, cerebral haemorrhage.
- Ibrahim Shams, 84, Egyptian weightlifter and Olympic champion (1936, 1948).
- Jules Vuillemin, 80, French philosopher.
- Auberon Waugh, 61, British journalist and author, heart failure.
- Leonard Woodcock, 89, American trade unionist and diplomat (U.S. ambassador to the People's Republic of China).

=== 17 ===
- Lucius Desha Bunton III, 76, American district judge (United States District Court for the Western District of Texas), heart attack.
- Gregory Corso, 70, American poet (Beat Generation), prostate cancer.
- Homero Cárpena, 90, Argentine film actor.
- John B. Hayes, 76, American coast guard admiral, struck by a car.
- Tom Kilburn, 79, British computer scientist, pneumonia following abdominal surgery.
- Sergej Kraigher, 86, Yugoslav politician, President of Slovenia.
- Garland O'Shields, 79, American basketball player.
- Robert Robertson, 70, British actor (Taggart, Breaking the Waves, Doctor Who), heart failure.
- Rito Romero, 73, Mexican professional wrestler, heart attack.
- Wakabayama Sadao, 78, Japanese sumo wrestler, cerebral thrombosis.
- Norris Turney, 79, American jazz flautist and saxophonist, kidney failure.
- Sigurd Vestad, 93, Norwegian cross-country skier and Olympian (1932).

=== 18 ===
- Mordechai Gifter, 85, American orthodox rabbi.
- Sigurd Grønli, 73, Norwegian Olympic rower (1948).
- Peter Haigh, 75, English BBC Television announcer.
- Zip Hanna, 84, American football player (Washington Redskins).
- Abdul Rahim Ishak, 75, Singaporean politician and journalist.
- Morris Lapidus, 98, Russian-American architect, heart failure.
- Evald Mahl, 85, Estonian basketball player and Olympian (1936).
- Sammy Odom, 59, American football player (Houston Oilers).
- Reg Prentice, Baron Prentice, 77, British politician and government minister.
- Imre Sinkovits, 72, Hungarian actor.
- Boris Stenin, 66, Soviet speed skater, coach, and Olympian (1960).
- Al Waxman, 65, Canadian actor (King of Kensington, Cagney & Lacey, Atlantic City).

=== 19 ===
- Johnny Babich, 87, American baseball player (Brooklyn Dodgers, Boston Bees, Philadelphia Athletics).
- Andy Dudish, 82, American football player (Buffalo Bisons, Baltimore Colts, Detroit Lions), complications from pneumonia.
- Alberto Gallardo, 60, Peruvian football player, manager, and Olympian (1960).
- Guillermo Giribaldi, 71, Curaçaoan footballer and Olympian (1952).
- Bill Hempel, 80, American football player (Chicago Bears).
- Maxine Mesinger, 75, American newspaper columnist (Houston Chronicle), complications of multiple sclerosis.
- Paul Olum, 82, American mathematician.
- Harry Oster, 77, American folklorist and musicologist.
- Mubarak Shah, 70, Pakistani long-distance runner and Olympian (1960).
- Gustave Thibon, 97, French philosopher and author.

=== 20 ===
- Rønnaug Alten, 90, Norwegian actress and stage instructor.
- Nico Assumpção, 46, Brazilian bass player, cancer.
- Santiago E. Campos, 74, American district judge (United States District Court for the District of New Mexico).
- Eddie Donovan, 78, American professional basketball coach and executive (New York Knicks), stroke.
- Beverley Peck Johnson, 96, American voice teacher, soprano, and pianist.
- Crispin Nash-Williams, 68, British mathematician.
- Michael Reinartz, 72, German Olympic rower (1952).
- Herb Scheffler, 83, American basketball player.
- Zdeněk Sobotka, 84, Czech Olympic high jumper (1936).

=== 21 ===
- Sasidharan Arattuvazhi, 45, Indian playwright and screenwriter, cirrhosis.
- Sandy Baron, 64, American stand-up comic, actor (Seinfeld) and songwriter, emphysema.
- Birger Bühring-Andersen, 93, Norwegian Olympic sports shooter (1948).
- Pier Giorgio Cazzola, 63, Italian sprinter and Olympian (1960).
- Byron De La Beckwith, 80, American white supremacist and klansman, cardiovascular disease.
- Walt Miller, 85, American basketball player.
- Joseph O'Conor, 84, Irish actor and playwright.
- Ricardo Castro Ríos, 80, Spanish-Argentine film actor, cancer.
- Nedžad Verlašević, 45, Yugoslav and Bosnian football manager and player, heart attack.

=== 22 ===
- Tommie Agee, 58, American baseball player, heart attack.
- Tuomas Anhava, 73, Finnish writer.
- Roy Brown, 68, American television personality, puppeteer and clown (The Bozo Show), congestive heart failure.
- Anne Burns, 85, British aeronautical engineer and glider pilot.
- Zuehl Conoly, 80, American football player (Chicago Cardinals).
- Sir Alistair Grant, 63, British businessman, cancer.

=== 23 ===
- Umar Mustafa al-Muntasir, 62, Libyan politician, Prime Minister.
- Albert David Baumhart, Jr., 92, American politician, member of the United States House of Representatives (1941-1942, 1955-1961).
- Vladimir Belyayev, 67, Soviet football player.
- Clayton Fritchey, 96, American journalist.
- Heinz Hopf, 66, Swedish actor, laryngeal cancer.
- Lou Levy, 72, American jazz pianist, heart attack.
- Jack McDuff, 74, American jazz organist, heart failure.
- Nedko Nedev, 80, Bulgarian football player.
- Fred Ray, 80, American comic book artist (Superman, Tomahawk).
- Mikael Sundström, 43, Finnish rally driver, heart attack.
- Moy Yat, 62, Hong Kong martial artist, painter, and author.

=== 24 ===
- Michael Chowdry, 46, Pakistani-American businessman, founder of Atlas Air, plane crash.
- Steve Dowden, 71, American gridiron football player (Baylor University, Green Bay Packers).
- Frans Pauwels, 82, Dutch racing cyclist.
- Leif Thybo, 78, Danish organist and composer.
- Osman Türkay, 73, Turkish Cypriot poet.
- Dick Whittinghill, 87, American film and television actor, and radio DJ.

=== 25 ===
- Alice Ambrose, 94, American philosopher, logician, and author.
- John T. Biggers, 76, American muralist.
- Aleksandr Chudakov, 79, Soviet and Russian physicist.
- Ashraf Fahmy, 64, Egyptian film director.
- Reijo Jalava, 68, Finnish footballer.
- Don Morrison, 77, Canadian ice hockey player (Detroit Red Wings, Chicago Black Hawks).
- Vijayaraje Scindia, 81, Indian politician.
- Margaret Scriven, 88, British tennis player.
- Guy Tréjan, 79, French actor.
- Dare Wright, 86, Canadian–American children's author, model, and photographer, respiratory failure.

=== 26 ===
- Murray Edelman, 81, American political scientist.
- Al McGuire, 72, American college basketball coach (Marquette University) and television commentator, leukemia.
- Valentino Orsini, 74, Italian film director.
- Fanula Papazoglu, 83, Yugoslav and Serbian classical scholar and epigrapher.

=== 27 ===
- Marie-José of Belgium, 94, Italian royal and last queen of Italy, lung cancer.
- Pedro Carrasco, 57, Spanish boxer, heart attack.
- Tommy Luther, 92, American horse racing jockey.
- Sándor Noszály, 60, Hungarian Olympic high jumper (1960).
- André Prévost, 66, Canadian music composer and instructor (Order of Canada).
- Robert Alexander Rankin, 85, Scottish mathematician.
- Arthur Jehu Stanley Jr., 99, American district judge (United States District Court for the District of Kansas).
- Cal Strong, 93, American water polo player and Olympian (1932).
- Hachiya Toshiyuki, 50, Japanese sumo wrestler, jaw cancer.

=== 28 ===
- Curt Blefary, 57, American baseball player, pancreatitis.
- Jill-Lyn Euto, 18, American murder victim.
- Al Fiorentino, 83, American professional football player (Washington Redskins, Boston Yanks).
- Earl Ben Gilliam, 69, American district judge (United States District Court for the Southern District of California).
- Ellen Hammer, 79, American historian, lymphoma.
- Stephen Malcolm, 30, Jamaican international football player, car accident.
- Sally Mansfield, 77, American actress (Rocky Jones, Space Ranger), lung cancer.
- Ranko Marinković, 87, Croatian novelist and dramatist.
- Thikkodiyan, 84, Indian playwright, novelist and lyricist.

=== 29 ===
- Frances Bible, 82, American operatic mezzo-soprano (New York City Opera).
- Julia Bodmer, 66, British geneticist.
- Edmund Fuller, 86, American educator, novelist, historian, and literary critic.
- Pablo Hernán, 23, Argentine football player, traffic accident.
- Larry Kimbrough, 77, American baseball player.
- Thomas C. Lea III, 93, American muralist, illustrator, novelist, and historian.
- Pierre Roche, 81, French-Canadian pianist, singer and composer, cancer.
- Ninian Smart, 73, Scottish religious scholar, stroke.
- Max Weiler, 90, Austrian painter.

=== 30 ===
- Jean-Pierre Aumont, 90, French actor, heart attack.
- Jean Coulston, 66, New Zealand cricket player.
- Edmund Fetting, 73, Polish film and theatrical actor and singer.
- David Heneker, 94, British composer and lyricist (Irma La Douce, Half a Sixpence, Charlie Girl).
- Job Dean Jessop, 74, American thoroughbred racing jockey.
- Johnnie Johnson, 85, British World War II fighter ace, cancer.
- O. Winston Link, 86, American photographer.
- Rodolfo Morales, 75, Mexican painter, pancreatic cancer.
- Michel Marcel Navratil, 92, French philosophy professor.
- John Prebble, 85, British journalist and historian.
- Joseph Ransohoff, 85, American neurosurgeon.
- Hartmut Reck, 68, German television and film actor.
- Bernie Semes, 82, American football player (Card-Pitt).
- John Taylor, 86, British Anglican bishop.

=== 31 ===
- Renaat Braem, 90, Belgian architect and urban planner.
- Gordon R. Dickson, 77, American science fiction writer, asthma.
- Adi Havewala, 83-84, Indian Olympic cyclist (1948).
- Albin Nyamoya, 76, Burundian politician, Prime Minister.
- Heinz Starke, 89, German politician.
- Manuel Suárez, 80, Spanish Olympic hurdler (1948).
