= 1950 European Athletics Championships – Men's 110 metres hurdles =

Men's 110 metres hurdles at the European Athletics Championships

The men's 110 metres hurdles at the 1950 European Athletics Championships was held in Brussels, Belgium, at Heysel Stadium on 23 and 24 August 1950.

== Medalists ==
Gold	André-Jacques Marie; France
Silver	Ragnar Lundberg; Sweden
Bronze	Peter Hildreth; Great Britain

== Results ==
=== Final ===
24 August Wind: 0.0 m/s

Rank	Name	Nationality	Time	Notes
1st place, gold medalist(s)	André-Jacques Marie	France	14.6	
2nd place, silver medalist(s)	Ragnar Lundberg	Sweden	14.7	
3rd place, bronze medalist(s)	Peter Hildreth	Great Britain	15.0	
4	Albano Albanese	Italy	15.1	
5	Gilbert Omnès	France	15.2	
6	Yevgeniy Bulanchik	Soviet Union	15.2	

=== Heats ===
23 August

==== Heat 1 ====
Wind: 0.9 m/s

Rank	Name	Nationality	Time	Notes
1	Yevgeniy Bulanchik	Soviet Union	14.8	Q
2	Peter Hildreth	Great Britain	15.0	Q
3	Franz Fritz	Austria	15.2	
4	Olivier Bernard	Switzerland	15.2	
5	Arnaldo Balestra	Italy	15.4	

==== Heat 2 ====
Wind: 0.6 m/s

Rank	Name	Nationality	Time	Notes
1	André-Jacques Marie	France	14.6	Q
2	Ragnar Lundberg	Sweden	14.8	Q
3	Pol Braekman	Belgium	14.9	
4	Mustafa Batman	Turkey	15.5	

==== Heat 3 ====
Wind: 1.1 m/s

Rank	Name	Nationality	Time	Notes
1	Albano Albanese	Italy	15.1	Q
2	Gilbert Omnès	France	15.2	Q
3	Milan Tosnar	Czechoslovakia	15.2	
4	Gösta Mattson	Sweden	15.2	
5	Raymond Barkway	Great Britain	15.2	
6	Pierre Van de Sijpe	Belgium	15.5	

== Participation ==
According to an unofficial count, 15 athletes from 10 countries participated in the event.

- Austria (1)
- Belgium (2)
- Czechoslovakia (1)
- France (2)
- Italy (2)
- Soviet Union (1)
- Sweden (2)
- Switzerland (1)
- Turkey (1)
- Great Britain (2)
