= Athletics at the 1948 Summer Olympics – Men's 110 metres hurdles =

Men's 110 metres hurdles at the Games of the XIV Olympiad
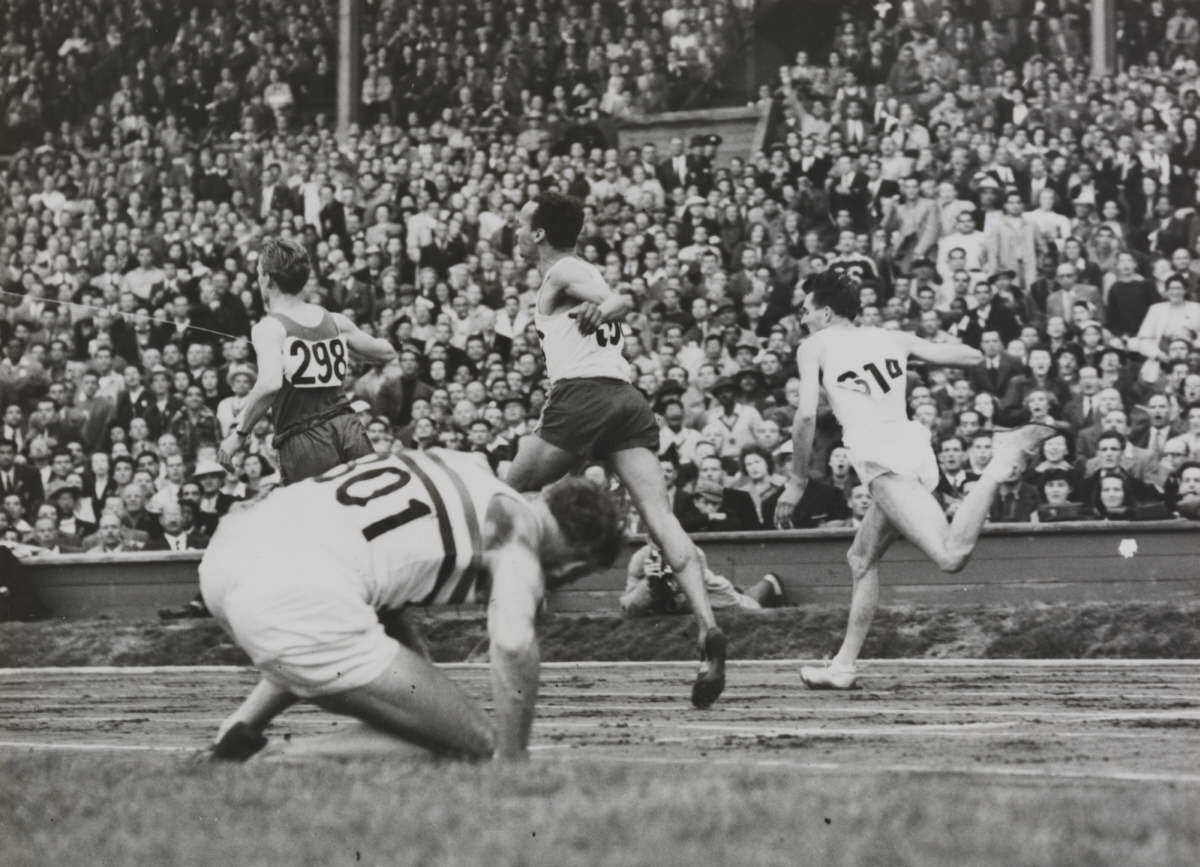
- Heat 5. 1932 and 1936 medalist Don Finlay (foreground) has fallen.
- Venue: Wembley Stadium
- Dates: 3 August 1948 (heats); 4 August 1948 (semifinals, final)
- Competitors: 28 from 18 nations
- Winning time: 13.9 OR

Medalists
1st place, gold medalist(s)		William Porter; United States
2nd place, silver medalist(s)		Clyde Scott; United States
3rd place, bronze medalist(s)		Craig Dixon; United States

Video on YouTube Official Video @ 44:40

The men's 110 metres hurdles event at the 1948 Summer Olympic Games took place on 3 and 4 August. Twenty-eight athletes from 18 nations competed. The maximum number of athletes per nation had been set at 3 since the 1930 Olympic Congress. The final was won by American William Porter. Porter's compatriots, Clyde Scott and Craig Dixon took 2nd and 3rd place. It was the third of nine consecutive American victories, and the ninth overall gold medal for the United States in the 110 metres hurdles. It was also the first of four consecutive American podium sweeps, and the fifth overall sweep by the United States in the event.

== Summary ==
With the absence of the best American hurdler Harrison Dillard, who did not qualify to the Olympics in the hurdles but did win gold in his secondary event, the 100 metres, the three Americans William Porter, Clyde Scott and Craig Dixon were headlong over the rest of the field. From the start to finish they ran almost neck to neck, with the others some five yards behind. In the finish, Porter gained a clear win with Scott beating Dixon by inches for second place.

== Background ==
This was the 11th appearance of the event, which is one of 12 athletics events to have been held at every Summer Olympics. Two finalists from the pre-war 1936 Games returned after the 12-year break: silver medalist (and 1932 bronze medalist) Don Finlay of Great Britain and fourth-place finisher Håkan Lidman of Sweden. The "prohibitive favorite" was Harrison Dillard of the United States—until he fell at the U.S. Olympic trials. The American team was deep, however, and Craig Dixon, William Porter, and Clyde Scott were all expected to medal.

Jamaica, Pakistan, Peru, Puerto Rico, Spain, and Turkey each made their first appearance in the event. The United States made its 11th appearance, the only nation to have competed in the 110 metres hurdles in each Games to that point.

== Competition format ==
The competition used the basic three-round format introduced in 1908. The first round consisted of six heats, with 4 or 5 hurdlers each. The top two hurdlers in each heat advanced to the semifinals. The 12 semifinalists were divided into two semifinals of 6 hurdlers each; the top three hurdlers in each advanced to the 6-man final.

== Records ==
These were the standing world and Olympic records (in seconds) prior to the 1948 Summer Olympics.

World record	Forrest Towns (USA)	13.7	Oslo, Norway	27 August 1936
Olympic record	Forrest Towns (USA)	14.1	Berlin, Germany	6 August 1936

William Porter matched the Olympic record in the second semifinal, then broke it in the final to set a new record of 13.9 seconds. The other two medalists each finished equal to the old record time.

== Schedule ==
All times are British Summer Time (UTC+1).

Date	Time	Round
Tuesday, 3 August 1948	15:45	Round 1
Wednesday, 4 August 1948	15:15; 17:00	Semifinals; Final

== Results ==
=== Round 1 ===
The first round was held on 3 August. The two fastest runners from each heat qualified to the semifinals.

==== Heat 1 ====
Rank	Lane	Athlete	Nation	Time (hand)	Time (auto)	Notes
1	1	William Porter	United States	14.3	14.5	Q
2	3	Pol Braekman	Belgium	15.2	15.33	Q
3	2	Mario Recordón	Chile	15.3	15.55	
4	4	Ray Barkway	Great Britain	15.3	15.53	
5	5	Erdal Barkay	Turkey	Unknown	—	
				Wind: +1.8 m/s		

==== Heat 2 ====
Rank	Lane	Athlete	Nation	Time (hand)	Time (auto)	Notes
1	1	Clyde Scott	United States	14.8	14.8	Q
2	3	Hugues Frayer	France	15.5	—	Q
3	2	Börje Rendin	Sweden	15.5	—	
4	4	Lazaros Petropoulakis	Greece	Unknown	—	
—	5	Mustapha Batman	Turkey	DNS	—	
				Wind: +0.8 m/s		

==== Heat 3 ====
Rank	Lane	Athlete	Nation	Time (hand)	Time (auto)	Notes
1	1	Alberto Triulzi	Argentina	14.6	14.7	Q
2	2	Peter Gardner	Australia	14.6	14.83	Q
3	5	Manuel Suárez	Spain	15.9	16.10	
4	3	Joe Birrell	Great Britain	Unknown	17.29	
5	4	Paul Crosfield	Greece	Unknown	17.30	
				Wind: +1.7 m/s		

==== Heat 4 ====
Rank	Lane	Athlete	Nation	Time (hand)	Time (auto)	Notes
1	4	Jim Vickers	India	14.7	14.9	Q
2	1	Håkan Lidman	Sweden	14.7	—	Q
3	5	Julio Sabater	Puerto Rico	15.3	—	
4	3	Jan Zwaan	Netherlands	15.4	—	
5	2	Charles Green	Australia	15.4	—	
				Wind: +0.0 m/s		

==== Heat 5 ====
Rank	Lane	Athlete	Nation	Time (hand)	Time (auto)	Notes
1	2	André Marie	France	14.4	15.0	Q
2	3	Olivier Bernard	Switzerland	14.9	—	Q
3	4	Sydney Foster	Jamaica	15.2	—	
—	1	Don Finlay	Great Britain	DNF	—	
—	5	Santiago Ferrando	Peru	DNS	—	
				Wind: +0.3 m/s		

==== Heat 6 ====
Rank	Lane	Athlete	Nation	Time (hand)	Time (auto)	Notes
1	1	Craig Dixon	United States	14.2	14.4	Q
2	2	Ray Weinberg	Australia	15.0	—	Q
3	3	Gilbert Omnès	France	15.2	—	
4	5	Hernán Alzamora	Peru	Unknown	—	
5	4	Mazhar-Ul-Haque Khan	Pakistan	Unknown	—	
				Wind: +0.3 m/s		

=== Semifinals ===
The semifinals were held on 4 August. The three fastest runners advanced to the final.

==== Semifinal 1 ====
Rank	Lane	Athlete	Nation	Time (hand)	Time (auto)	Notes
1	1	Craig Dixon	United States	14.2	14.4	Q
2	2	Peter Gardner	Australia	14.5	14.78	Q
3	3	Håkan Lidman	Sweden	14.6	14.84	Q
4	6	Pol Braekman	Belgium	Unknown	15.22	
5	5	Olivier Bernard	Switzerland	Unknown	—	
—	4	André Marie	France	DNF	—	
				Wind: +0.9 m/s		

==== Semifinal 2 ====
Rank	Lane	Athlete	Nation	Time (hand)	Time (auto)	Notes
1	1	William Porter	United States	14.1	14.2	Q, =OR
2	4	Clyde Scott	United States	14.2	14.2	Q
3	2	Alberto Triulzi	Argentina	14.6	14.76	Q
4	3	Jim Vickers	India	Unknown	15.09	
5	5	Ray Weinberg	Australia	Unknown	15.27	
6	6	Hugues Frayer	France	Unknown	15.35	
				Wind: +0.0 m/s		

=== Final ===
Rank	Lane	Athlete	Nation	Time (hand)	Time (auto)	Notes
1st place, gold medalist(s)	2	William Porter	United States	13.9	14.2	OR
2nd place, silver medalist(s)	6	Clyde Scott	United States	14.1	14.24	
3rd place, bronze medalist(s)	1	Craig Dixon	United States	14.1	14.29	
4	4	Alberto Triulzi	Argentina	14.6	14.71	
5	5	Peter Gardner	Australia	14.7	14.79	
6	3	Håkan Lidman	Sweden	14.8	14.86	
				Wind: +0.0 m/s		
