= 1946 European Athletics Championships – Men's 110 metres hurdles =

Men's 110 metres hurdles at the European Athletics Championships

The men's 110 metres hurdles at the 1946 European Athletics Championships was held in Oslo, Norway, at Bislett Stadion on 24 and 25 August 1946.

== Medalists ==
Gold	Håkan Lidman; Sweden
Silver	Pol Braekman; Belgium
Bronze	Väinö Suvivuo; Finland

== Results ==
=== Final ===
25 August

Rank	Name	Nationality	Time	Notes
1st place, gold medalist(s)	Håkan Lidman	Sweden	14.6	
2nd place, silver medalist(s)	Pol Braekman	Belgium	14.9	
3rd place, bronze medalist(s)	Väinö Suvivuo	Finland	15.0	
4	Gösta Risberg	Sweden	15.2	
5	Edvin Larsen	Denmark	15.3	
6	Henri Maignan	France	15.5	

=== Heats ===
24 August

==== Heat 1 ====
Rank	Name	Nationality	Time	Notes
1	Pol Braekman	Belgium	14.8	Q
2	Gösta Risberg	Sweden	14.9	Q
3	Edvin Larsen	Denmark	14.9	Q
4	André-Jacques Marie	France	15.0	
5	Veikko Jussila	Finland	15.1	
6	József Kiss	Hungary	15.5	

==== Heat 2 ====
Rank	Name	Nationality	Time	Notes
1	Håkan Lidman	Sweden	14.7	Q
2	Väinö Suvivuo	Finland	15.1	Q
3	Henri Maignan	France	15.2	Q
4	Pierre Van de Sijpe	Belgium	15.4	
5	Milan Tosnar	Czechoslovakia	15.4	
6	Werner Christen	Switzerland	15.6	

== Participation ==
According to an unofficial count, 12 athletes from 8 countries participated in the event.

- Belgium (2)
- Czechoslovakia (1)
- Denmark (1)
- Finland (2)
- France (2)
- Hungary (1)
- Sweden (2)
- Switzerland (1)
