= William Porter (hurdler) =

American track and field athlete

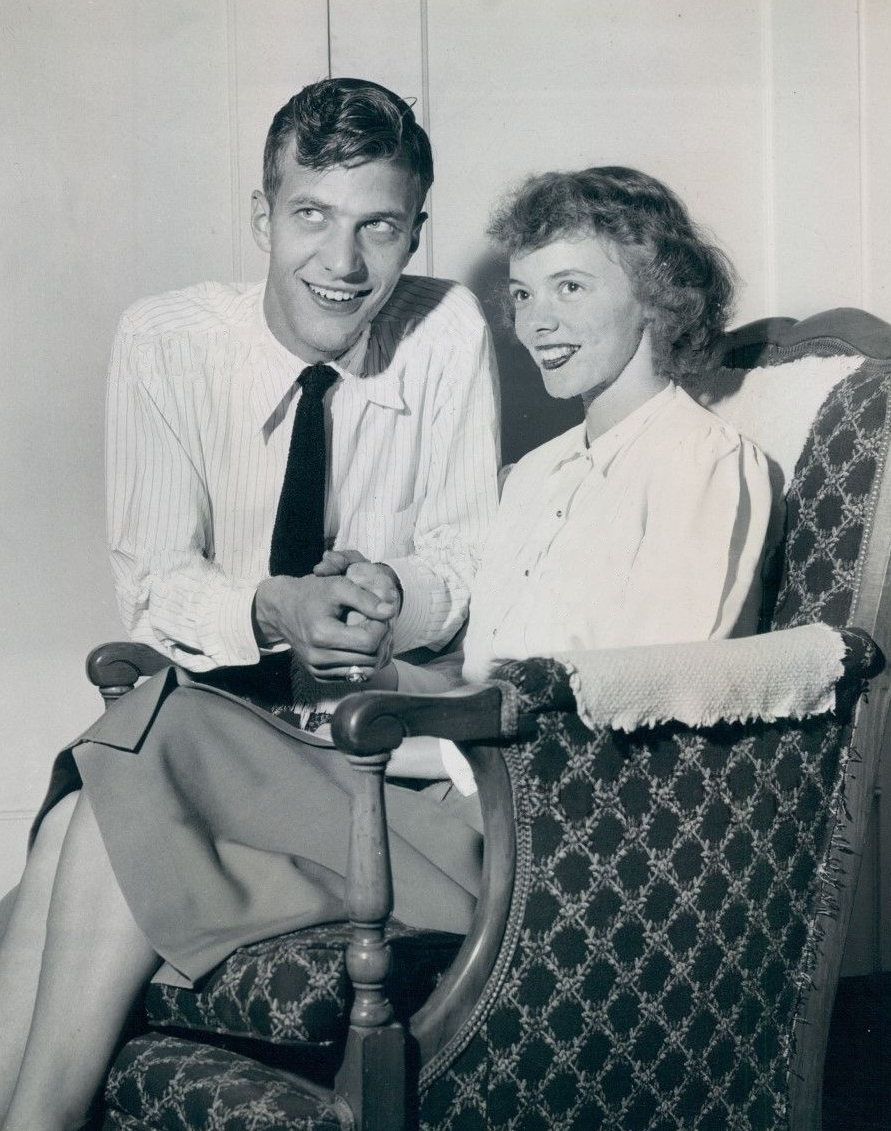
- Porter with wife in 1948

Personal information
- Born: March 24, 1926 Jackson, Michigan, U.S.
- Died: March 10, 2000 (aged 73) Irvine, California, U.S.
- Height: 190 cm (6 ft 3 in)
- Weight: 73 kg (161 lb)

Sport
- Sport: athletics
- Event: 110 m hurdles
- Club: Northwestern Wildcats, Evanston

Achievements and titles
- Personal best: 13.90 (1948)
Medal record
Representing the United States
Olympic Games
Gold medal – first place	1948 London	110 m hurdles

William "Bill" Franklin Porter III (March 24, 1926 – March 10, 2000) was an American track and field athlete, gold medal winner of the 110-meter hurdles at the 1948 Summer Olympics.

Born in Jackson, Michigan, Porter attended the Jackson High School, but did not compete in any sport there. He took up hurdle running while attending The Hill School in Pennsylvania. He then enrolled to the Western Michigan University, and later transferred to the Northwestern University, where he captained the athletics team.

Porter won his only AAU Championship title in 1948 in 110 m hurdles and thus qualified for the Olympic Games. The best American hurdler at the time was Harrison Dillard. He beat Porter to the second place at the 1947 and 1948 NCAA Championships, but fell ill at the 1948 Olympic trials and did not qualify. At the Olympics three other Americans: Porter, Clyde Scott and Craig Dixon were headlong over the rest of the field in the Olympic final. From the start to finish they ran almost neck to neck, with the others some five yards behind. In the finish, Porter gained a clear win, setting his personal best and a new Olympic record.

Porter married shortly before the 1948 Olympics, and retired from competitions soon after that. He later worked for the Northwestern Alumni Association Board and after that opened a medical supply agency in California.
