= Solar panels on spacecraft =

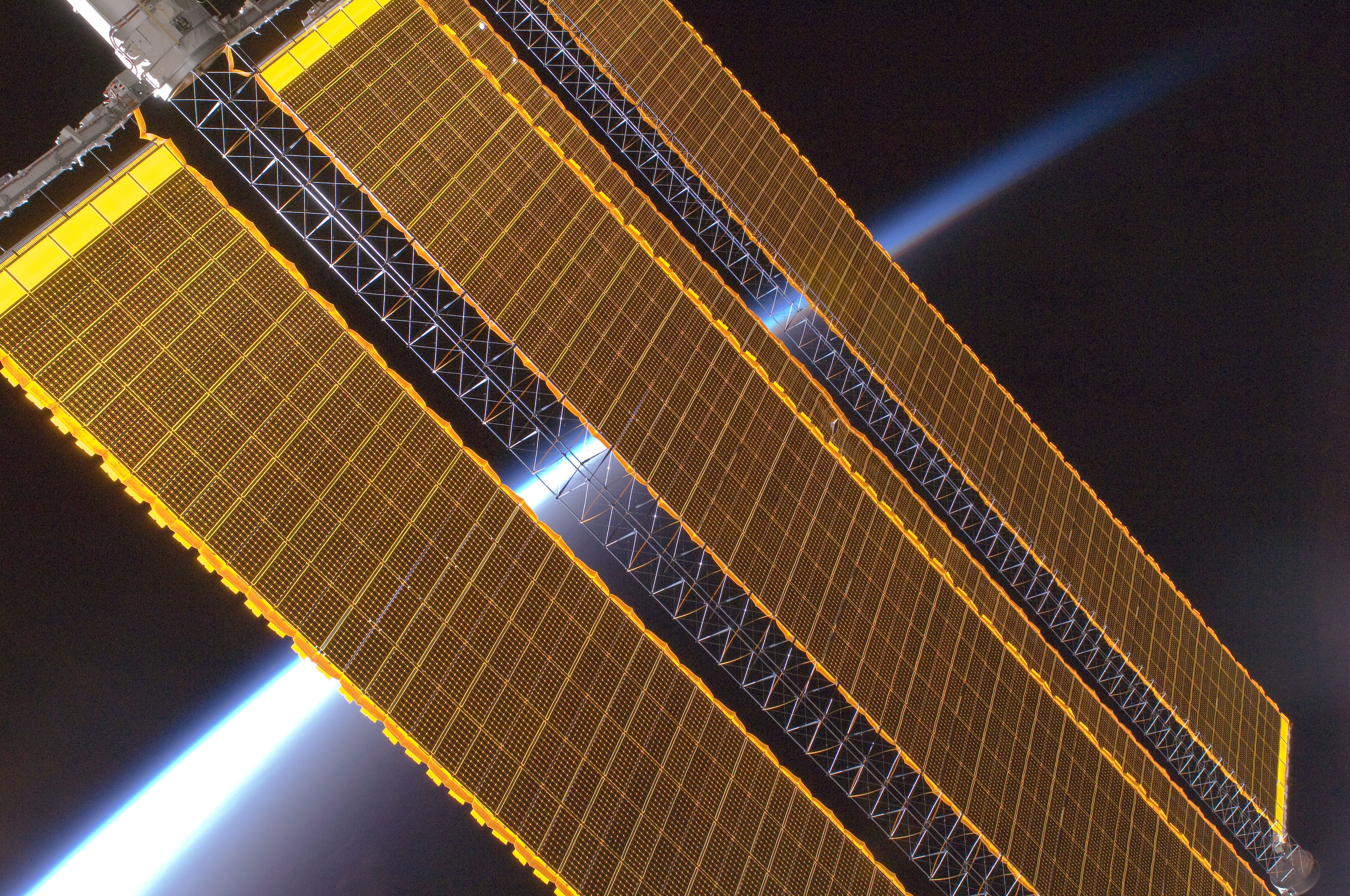
A solar panel array of the International Space Station (Expedition 17 crew, August 2008)

Photovoltaic solar panels are the power source for almost all spacecraft ever launched. Modern spacecraft typically use multi-junction solar cell and gallium arsenide-based panels. The first solar-powered spacecraft was Vanguard 1, the second artificial satellite.

Near geocentric orbit, spacecraft extensively use solar panels. As well as almost all satellites, all crewed space stations have utilized solar panels; the International Space Station's array is the largest ever assembled in space, at 3,244 m^{2} and a 73 m wingspan. Solar power has been used other crewed spacecraft including Soyuz, Shenzhou, Crew Dragon, and Orion.

As distance from the Sun increases, solar radiation weakens, making radioisotope thermoelectric generators (RTGs) a more favorable power source for missions to Mars, to the outer planets, and those leaving the Solar System. Larger solar arrays have nonetheless been used extensively around Mars, and by the Jupiter missions of Juno, Jupiter Icy Moons Explorer, and Europa Clipper, partially due to a global shortage of plutonium-238. Other nuclear power alternatives in space include specialized fission reactors, such as aboard the SNAP-10A and US-A satellites, and NASA's modern Kilopower project.

== History ==
The first practical silicon-based solar cells were introduced by Russell Shoemaker Ohl, a researcher at Bell Labs in 1940. It was only 1% efficient. On April 25, 1954 in Murray Hill, New Jersey, they demonstrated their solar panel by using it to power a small toy Ferris wheel and a solar powered radio transmitter. They were initially about 6% efficient, but improvements began to raise this number almost immediately. Bell had been interested in the idea as a system to provide power at remote telephone repeater stations, but the cost of the devices was far too high to be practical in this role. Aside from small experimental kits and uses, the cells remained largely unused.

This changed with the development of the first US spacecraft, the Vanguard 1 satellite in 1958. Calculations by Dr. Hans Ziegler demonstrated that a system using solar cells recharging a battery pack would provide the required power in a much lighter overall package than using just a battery. The satellite was powered by silicon solar cells with ≈10% conversion efficiency.

A few weeks after the US launched Vanguard 1, Sputnik 3 was launched by the Soviet space program outfitted with Silver zinc batteries with experimental silicon solar cells. The purpose of the batteries was both to power the transmitter and other equipment, but also to test the long term effects of radiation and micrometeorite damage on solar batteries. Some of the batteries were covered with protective glass while others were left exposed. The batteries were able to power the 20 MHz Mayak transmitter and Sergei Vernov's Scintillation counter, and these functioned for the entire lifetime of the satellite; until it reentered the Atmosphere nearly two years later.

The success of the Vanguard system inspired Spectrolab, an optics company, to take up the development of solar cells specifically designed for space applications. They had their first major design win on Pioneer 1 in 1958, and would later be the first cells to travel to the Moon, on the Apollo 11 mission's ALSEP package. As satellites grew in size and power, Spectrolab began looking for ways to introduce much more powerful cells. This led them to pioneer the development of multi-junction cells that increased efficiency from around 12% for their 1970s silicon cells to about 30% for their current gallium arsenide (GaAs) cells. These types of cells are now used almost universally on all solar-powered spacecraft.

== Uses ==
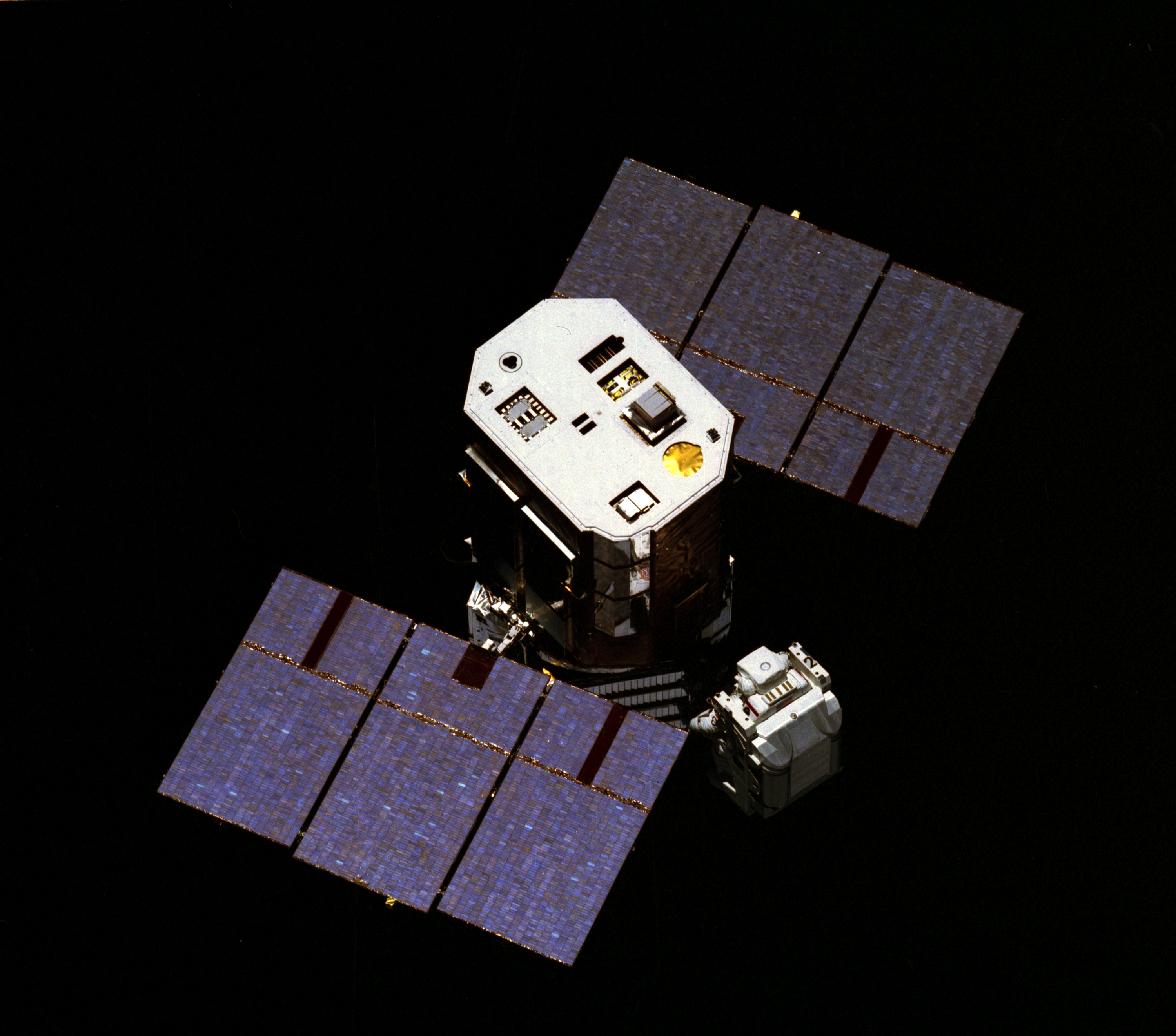
The solar panels on the SMM satellite provided electrical power. Here it is being captured by an astronaut using the Manned Maneuvering Unit.

Solar panels on spacecraft supply power for two main uses:

- Power to run the sensors, active heating, cooling and telemetry.
- Power for electrically powered spacecraft propulsion, sometimes called electric propulsion or solar-electric propulsion.

For both uses, a key figure of merit of the solar panels is the specific power (watts generated divided by solar array mass), which indicates on a relative basis how much power one array will generate for a given launch mass relative to another. Another key metric is stowed packing efficiency (deployed watts produced divided by stowed volume), which indicates how easily the array will fit into a launch vehicle. Yet another key metric is cost (dollars per watt).

To increase the specific power, typical solar panels on spacecraft use close-packed solar cell rectangles that cover nearly 100% of the Sun-visible area of the solar panels, rather than the solar wafer circles which, even though close-packed, cover about 90% of the Sun-visible area of typical solar panels on Earth. However, some solar panels on spacecraft have solar cells that cover only 30% of the Sun-visible area.

== Implementation ==
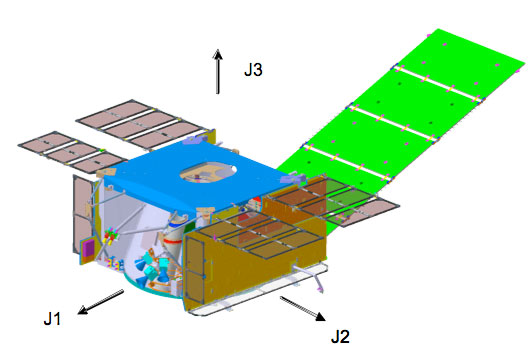
Diagram of the spacecraft bus on the James Webb Space Telescope, which is powered by solar panels (coloured green in this 3/4 view). Note that shorter light purple extensions are radiator shades not solar panels.

Solar panels need to have a lot of surface area that can be pointed towards the Sun as the spacecraft moves. More exposed surface area means more electricity can be converted from light energy from the Sun. Since spacecraft have to be small, this limits the amount of power that can be produced.

All electrical circuits generate waste heat; in addition, solar arrays act as optical and thermal as well as electrical collectors. Heat must be radiated from their surfaces. High-power spacecraft may have solar arrays that compete with the active payload itself for thermal dissipation. The innermost panel of arrays may be "blank" to reduce the overlap of views to space. Such spacecraft include the higher-power communications satellites (e.g., later-generation TDRS) and Venus Express, not high-powered but closer to the Sun.

Spacecraft are built so that the solar panels can be pivoted as the spacecraft moves. Thus, they can always stay in the direct path of the light rays no matter how the spacecraft is pointed. Spacecraft are usually designed with solar panels that can always be pointed at the Sun, even as the rest of the body of the spacecraft moves around, much as a tank turret can be aimed independently of where the tank is going. A tracking mechanism is often incorporated into the solar arrays to keep the array pointed towards the sun.

Sometimes, satellite operators purposefully orient the solar panels to "off point," or out of direct alignment from the Sun. This happens if the batteries are completely charged and the amount of electricity needed is lower than the amount of electricity made; off-pointing is also sometimes used on the International Space Station for orbital drag reduction.

== Ionizing radiation issues and mitigation ==
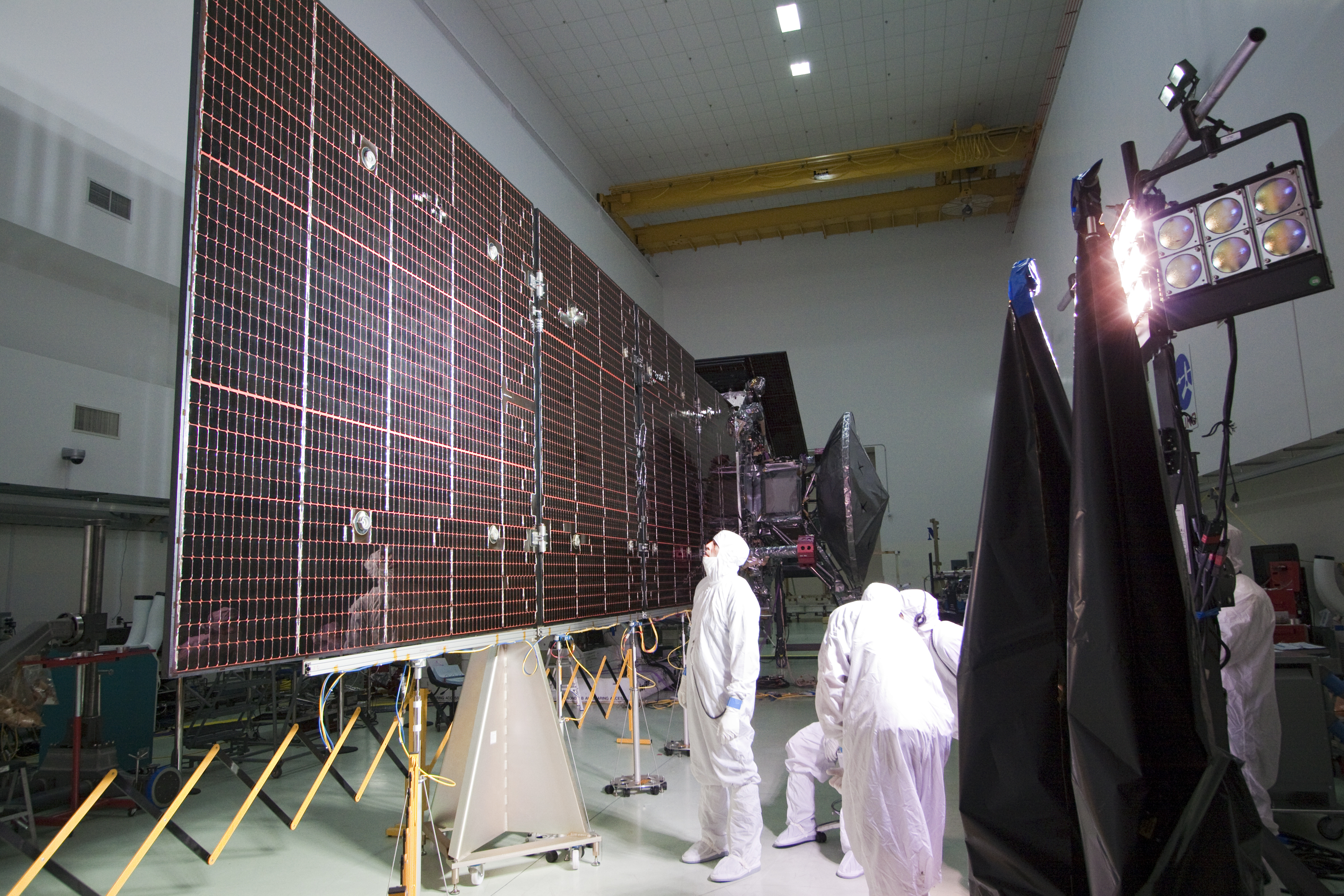
Juno is the second spacecraft to orbit Jupiter and the first solar-powered craft to do so.

Space contains varying levels of great electromagnetic radiation as well as ionizing radiation. There are 4 sources of radiations: the Earth's radiation belts (also called Van Allen belts), galactic cosmic rays (GCR), solar wind and solar flares. The Van Allen belts and the solar wind contain mostly protons and electrons, while GCR are in majority very high energy protons, alpha particles and heavier ions. Solar panels will experience efficiency degradation over time as a result of these types of radiation, but the degradation rate will depend strongly on the solar cell technology and on the location of the spacecraft. With borosilicate glass panel coverings, this may be between 5-10% efficiency loss per year. Other glass coverings, such as fused silica and lead glasses, may reduce this efficiency loss to less than 1% per year. The degradation rate is a function of the differential flux spectrum and the total ionizing dose.

== Types of solar cells typically used ==
Up until the early 1990s, solar arrays used in space primarily used crystalline silicon solar cells. Since the early 1990s, Gallium arsenide-based solar cells became favored over silicon because they have a higher efficiency and degrade more slowly than silicon in the space radiation environment. The most efficient solar cells currently in production are now multi-junction photovoltaic cells. These use a combination of several layers of indium gallium phosphide, gallium arsenide and germanium to harvest more energy from the solar spectrum. Leading edge multi-junction cells are capable of exceeding 39.2% under non-concentrated AM1.5G illumination and 47.1% using concentrated AM1.5G illumination.

== Spacecraft that have used solar power ==
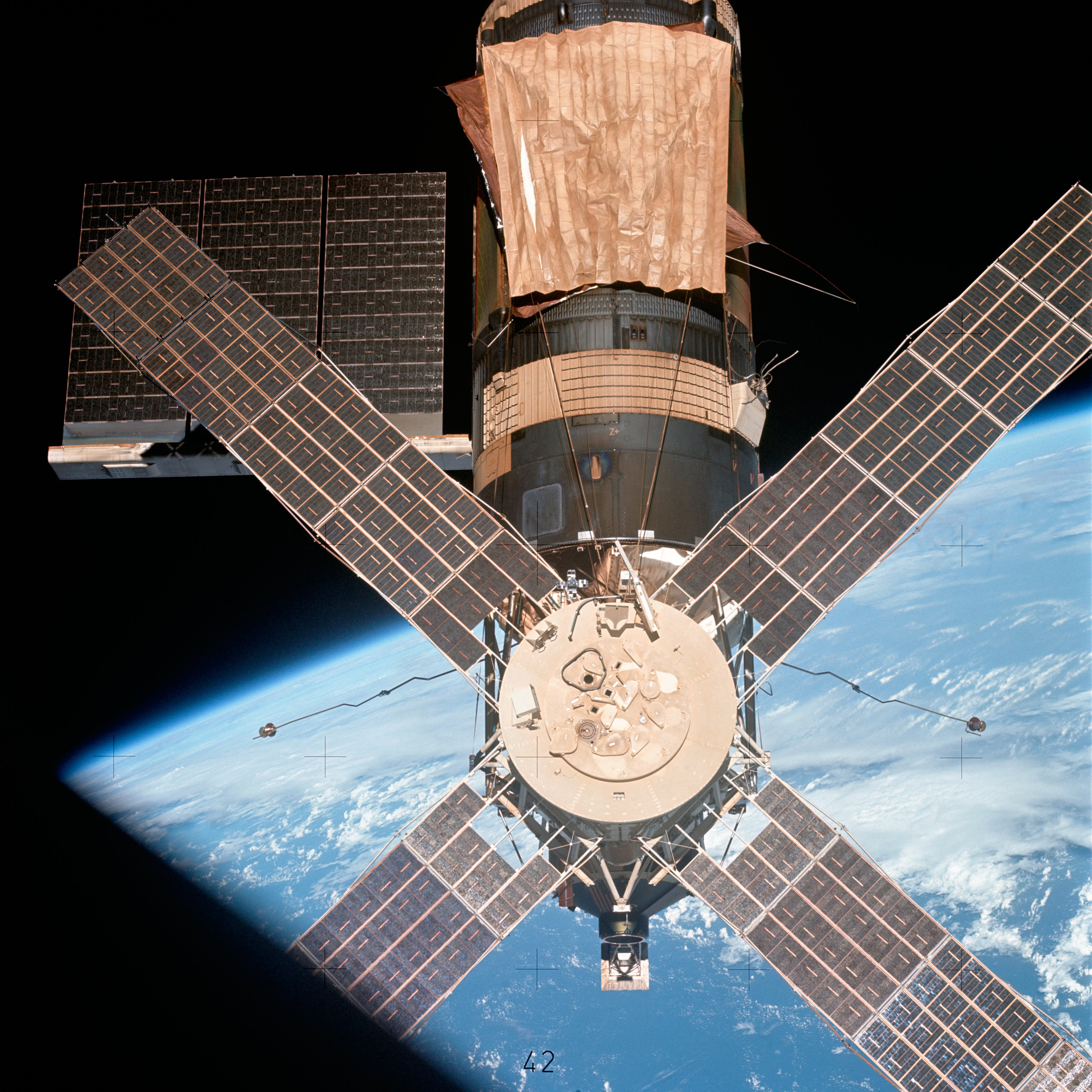
Solar panels extended out from the Apollo Telescope Mount, power solar observatory instruments on the Skylab station, which also had an additional array on the main spacecraft

To date, solar power, other than for propulsion, has been practical for spacecraft operating no farther from the Sun than the orbit of Jupiter. For example, Juno, Magellan, Mars Global Surveyor, and Mars Observer used solar power as does the Earth-orbiting, Hubble Space Telescope. The Rosetta space probe, launched 2 March 2004, used its 64 square metres (690 sq ft) of solar panels as far as the orbit of Jupiter (5.25 AU); previously the furthest use was the Stardust spacecraft at 2 AU. Solar power for propulsion was also used on the European lunar mission SMART-1 with a Hall effect thruster.

The Juno mission, launched in 2011, is the first mission to Jupiter (arrived at Jupiter on July 4, 2016) to use solar panels instead of the traditional RTGs that are used by previous outer Solar System missions, making it the furthest spacecraft to use solar panels to date. It has 50 square metres (540 sq ft) of panels.

The InSight lander, Ingenuity helicopter, Tianwen-1 orbiter, and Zhurong rover all currently operating on Mars also utilize solar panels.

Another spacecraft of interest was Dawn which went into orbit around 4 Vesta in 2011. It used ion thrusters to get to Ceres.

The potential for solar powered spacecraft beyond Jupiter has been studied.

The International Space Station also uses solar arrays to power everything on the station. The 262,400 solar cells cover around 27,000 square feet (2,500 m^{2}) of space. There are four sets of solar arrays that power the station and the fourth set of arrays were installed in March 2009. 240 kilowatts of electricity can be generated from these solar arrays. That comes to 120 kilowatts average system power, including 50% ISS time in Earth's shadow.

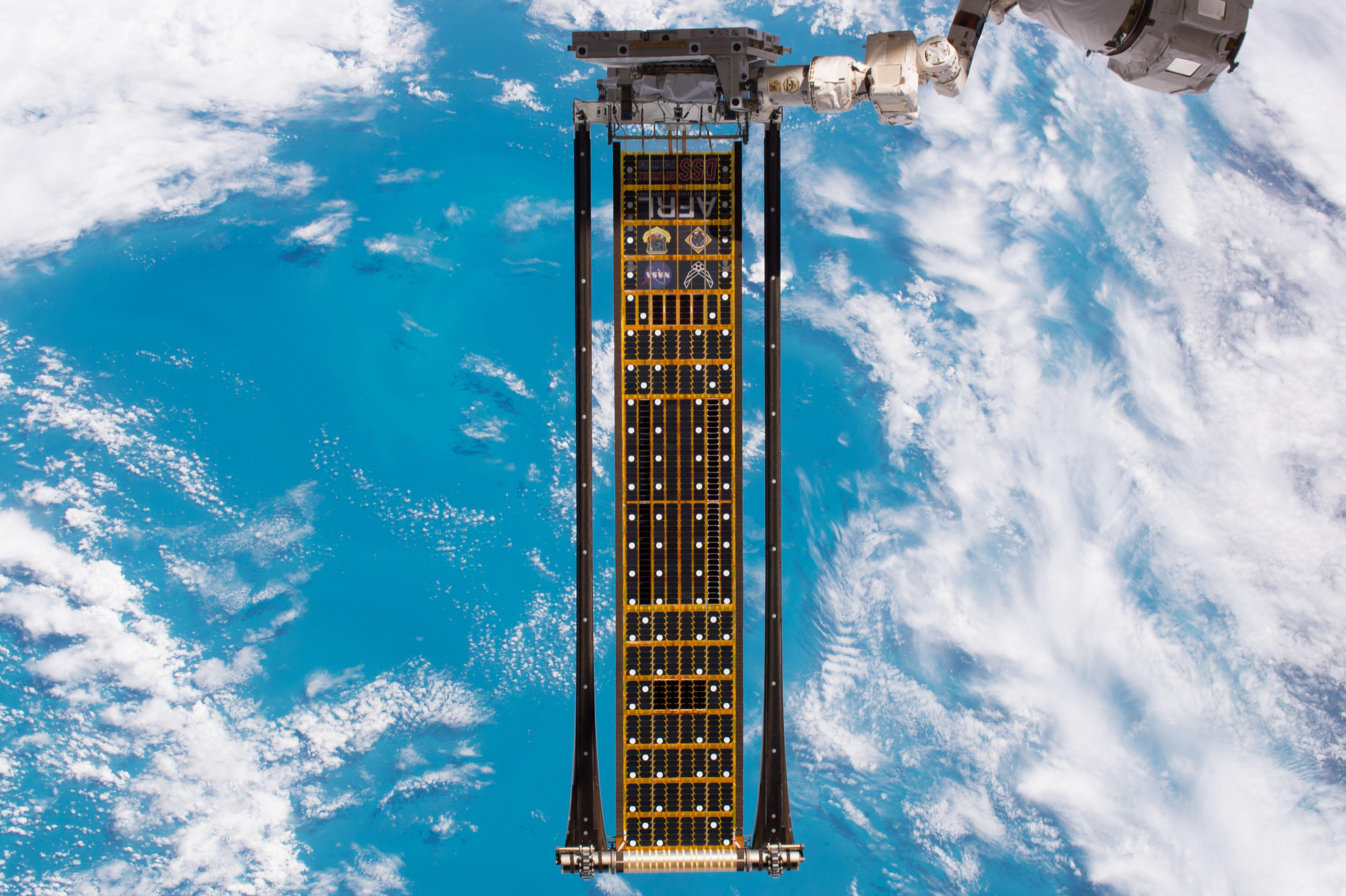
Flexible solar arrays are being investigated for use in space. The Roll Out Solar Array (ROSA) was deployed on the International Space Station in July 2017.

== Future uses ==
For future missions, it is desirable to reduce solar array mass, and to increase the power generated per unit area. This will reduce overall spacecraft mass, and may make the operation of solar-powered spacecraft feasible at larger distances from the sun. Solar array mass could be reduced with thin-film photovoltaic cells, flexible blanket substrates, and composite support structures. Solar array efficiency could be improved by using new photovoltaic cell materials and solar concentrators that intensify the incident sunlight. Photovoltaic concentrator solar arrays for primary spacecraft power are devices which intensify the sunlight on the photovoltaics. This design uses a flat lens, called a Fresnel lens, which takes a large area of sunlight and concentrates it onto a smaller spot, allowing a smaller area of solar cell to be used.

Solar concentrators put one of these lenses over every solar cell. This focuses light from the large concentrator area down to the smaller cell area. This allows the quantity of expensive solar cells to be reduced by the amount of concentration. Concentrators work best when there is a single source of light and the concentrator can be pointed right at it. This is ideal in space, where the Sun is a single light source. Solar cells are the most expensive part of solar arrays, and arrays are often a very expensive part of the spacecraft. This technology may allow costs to be cut significantly due to the utilization of less material.

== Gallery ==
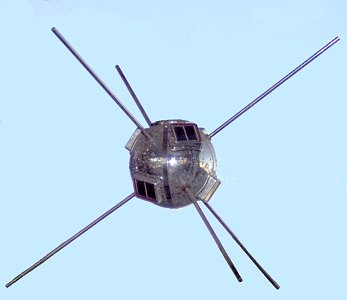
Vanguard 1, the first solar powered satellite

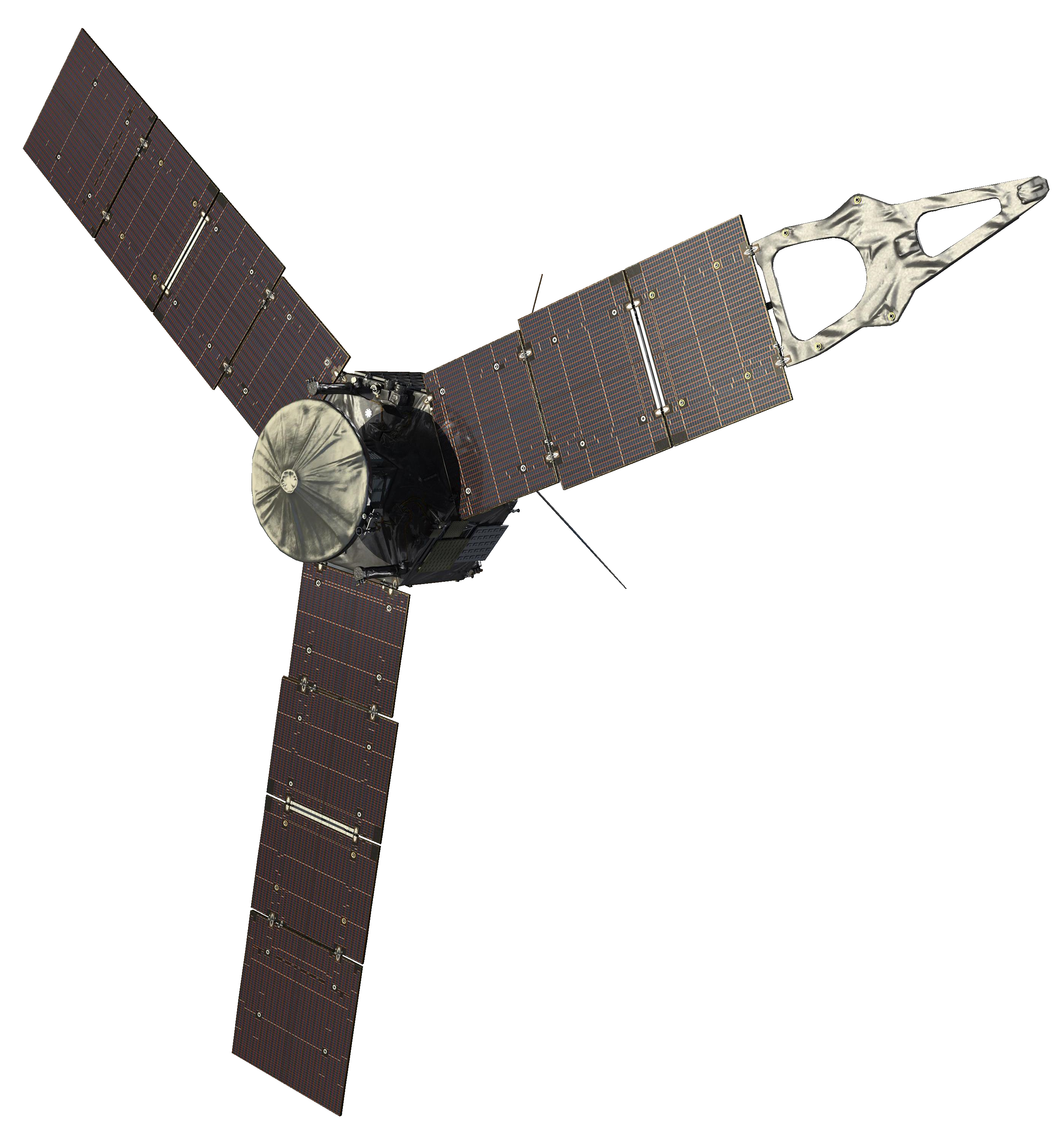
The Juno space probe

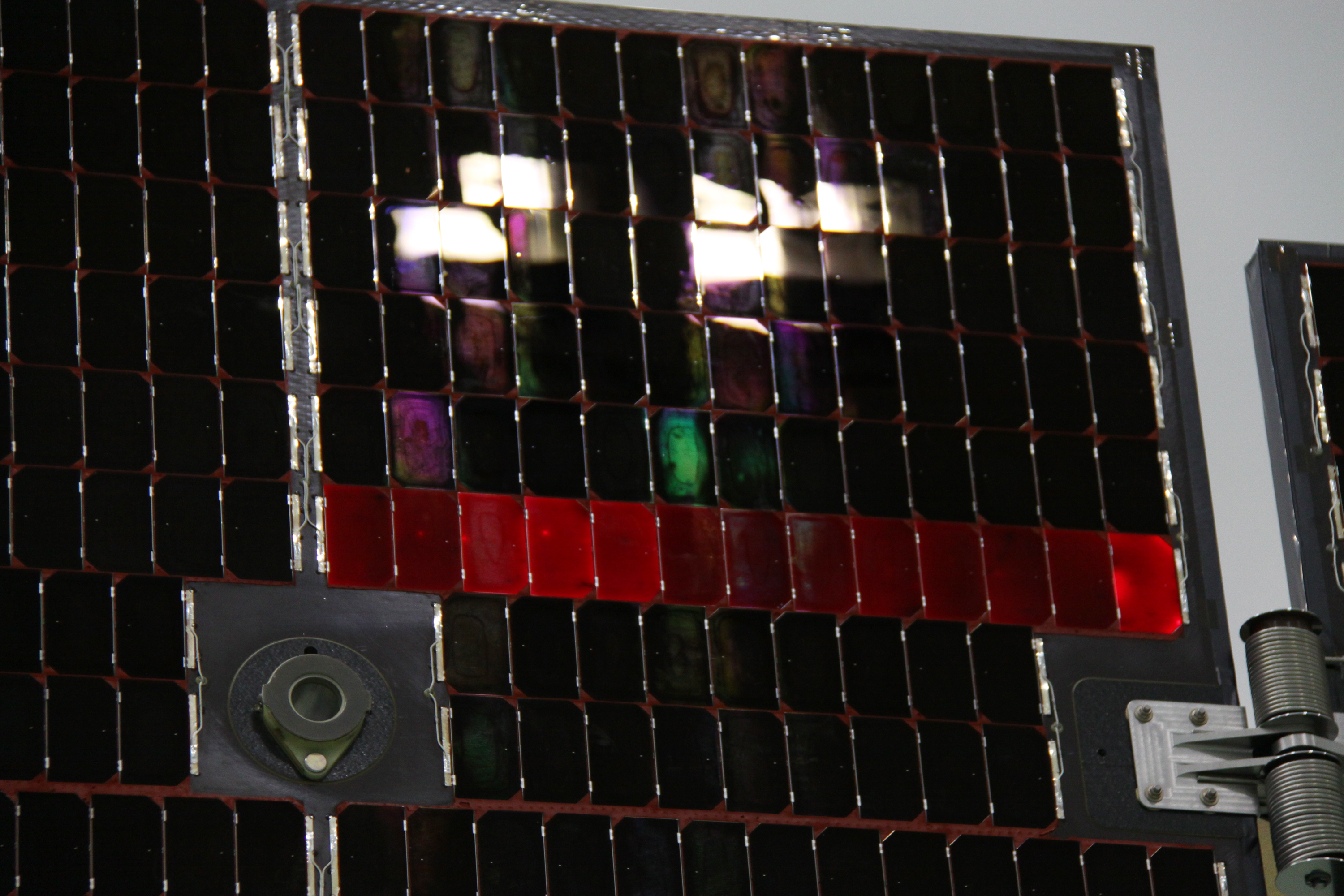
A section of one of Juno's solar panels

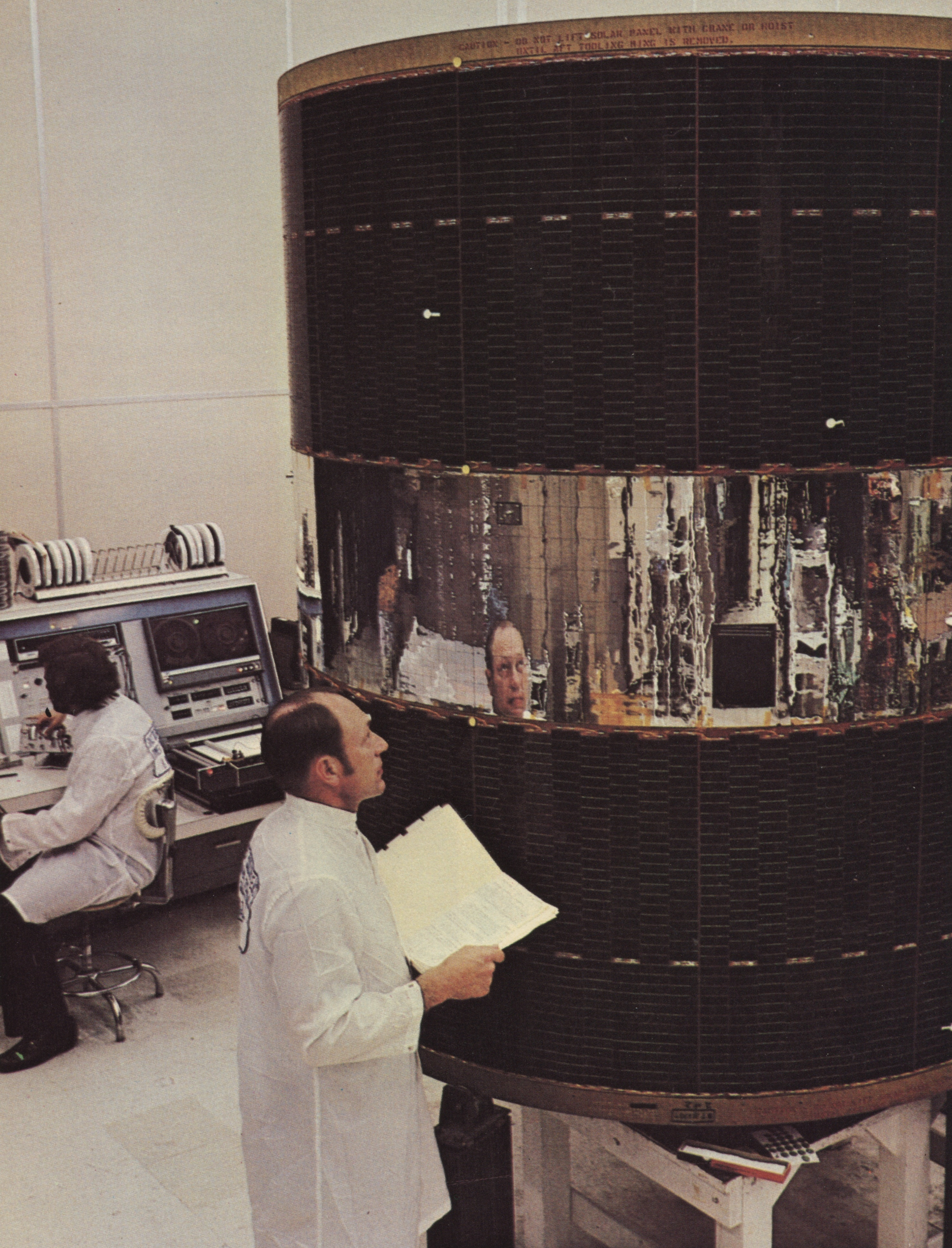
Solar panel drum at Hughes Aircraft Company, c. 1979

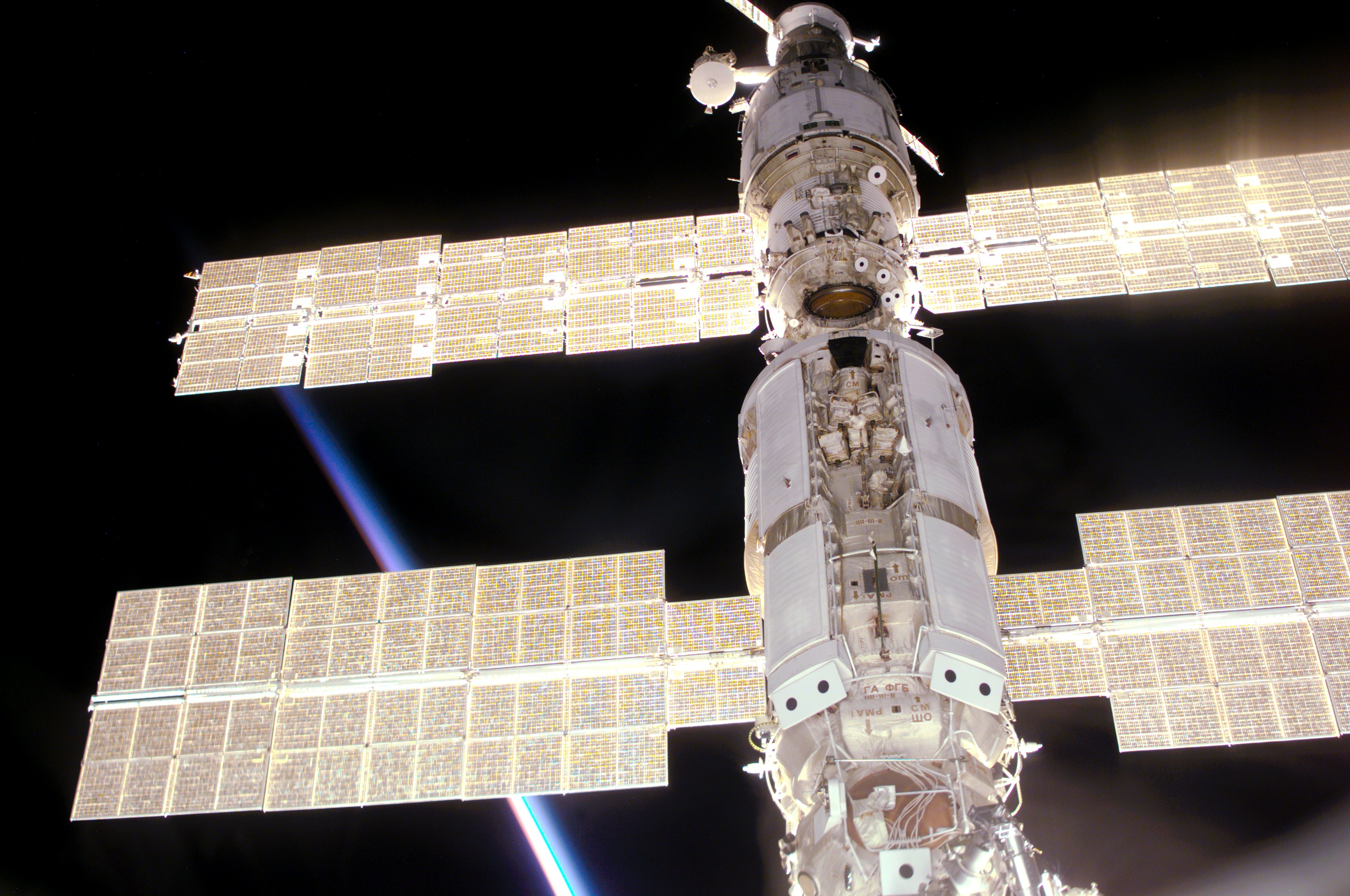
Solar panels on the International Space Station, September 2000

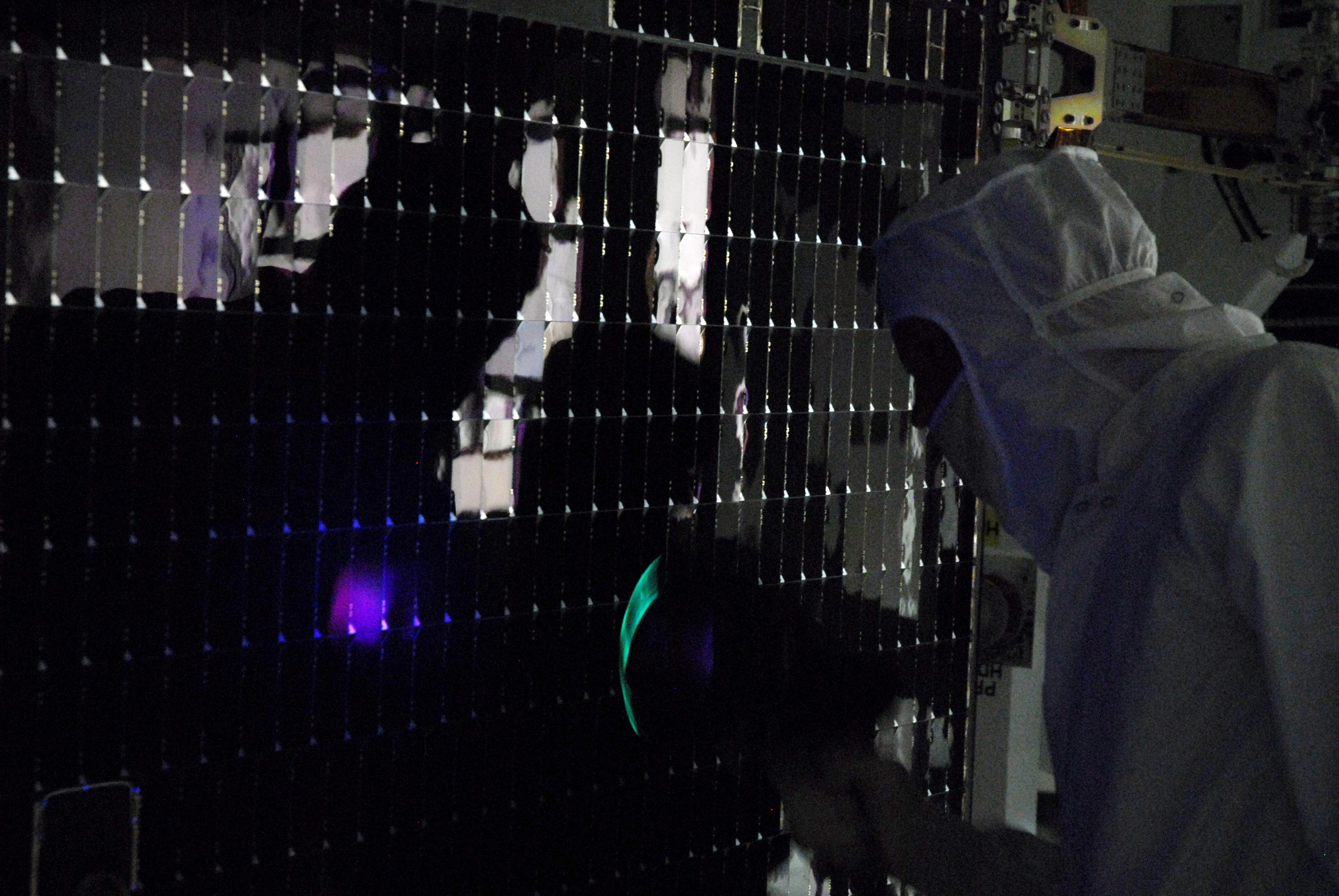
Black light test of Dawn's triple-junction gallium arsenide solar cells

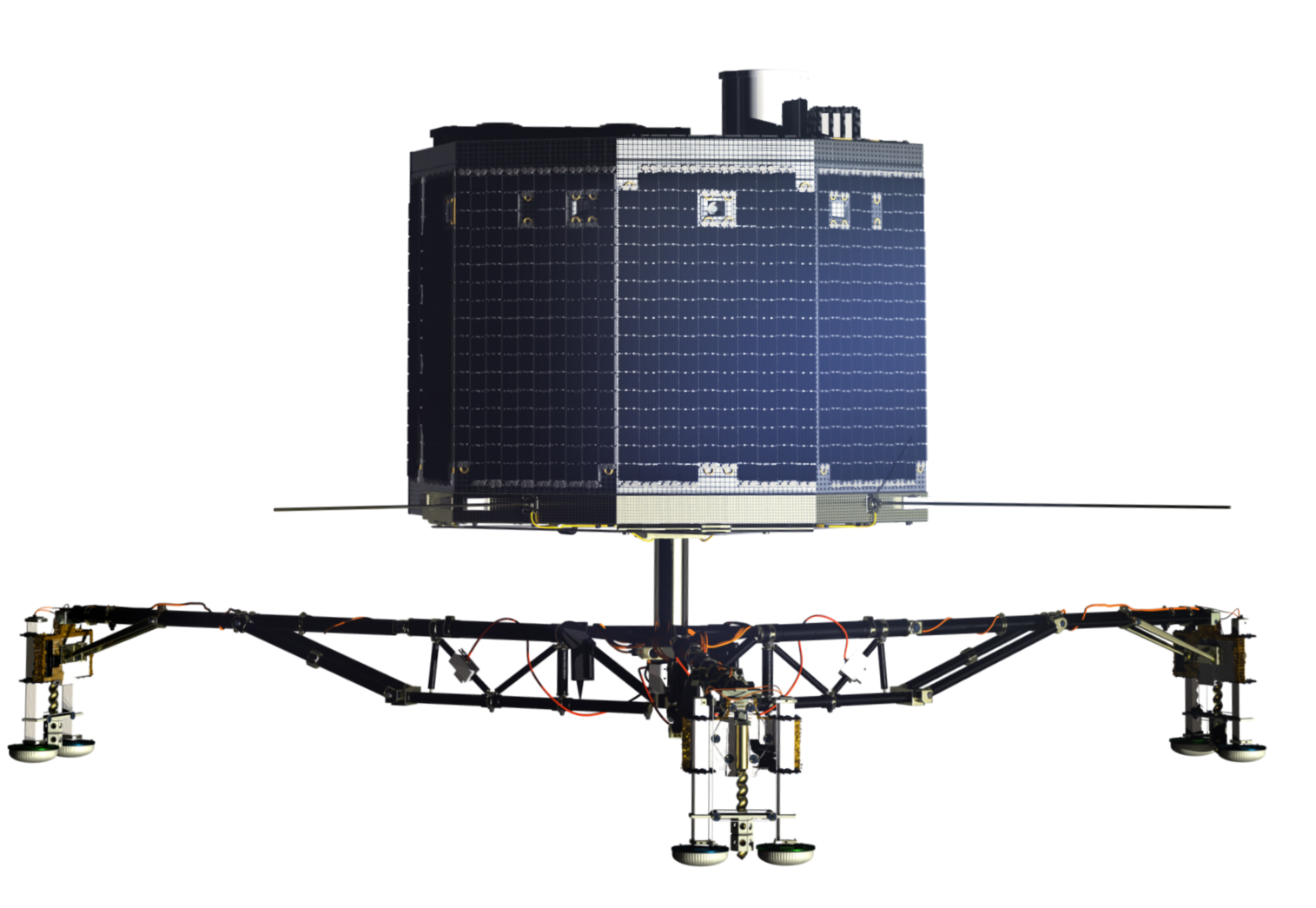
Rosetta's lander Philae

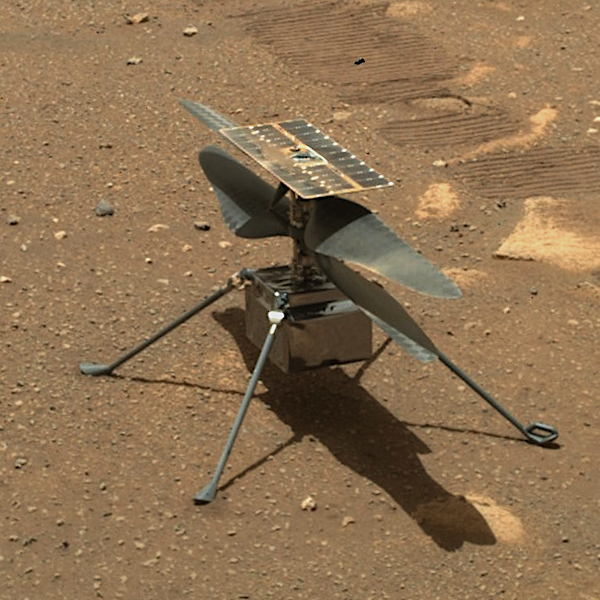
The Mars helicopter Ingenuity's batteries are powered by solar panels.

== See also ==
- For solar arrays on the International Space Station, see ISS Solar Arrays or Electrical system of the International Space Station
- Ingenuity Mars 2020 helicopter runs on batteries powered by solar panels
- Nuclear power in space
- Photovoltaic system
- Solar cell
- Space-based solar power
