= Milan Tošnar =

Czech athlete (hurdler), coach and sports official

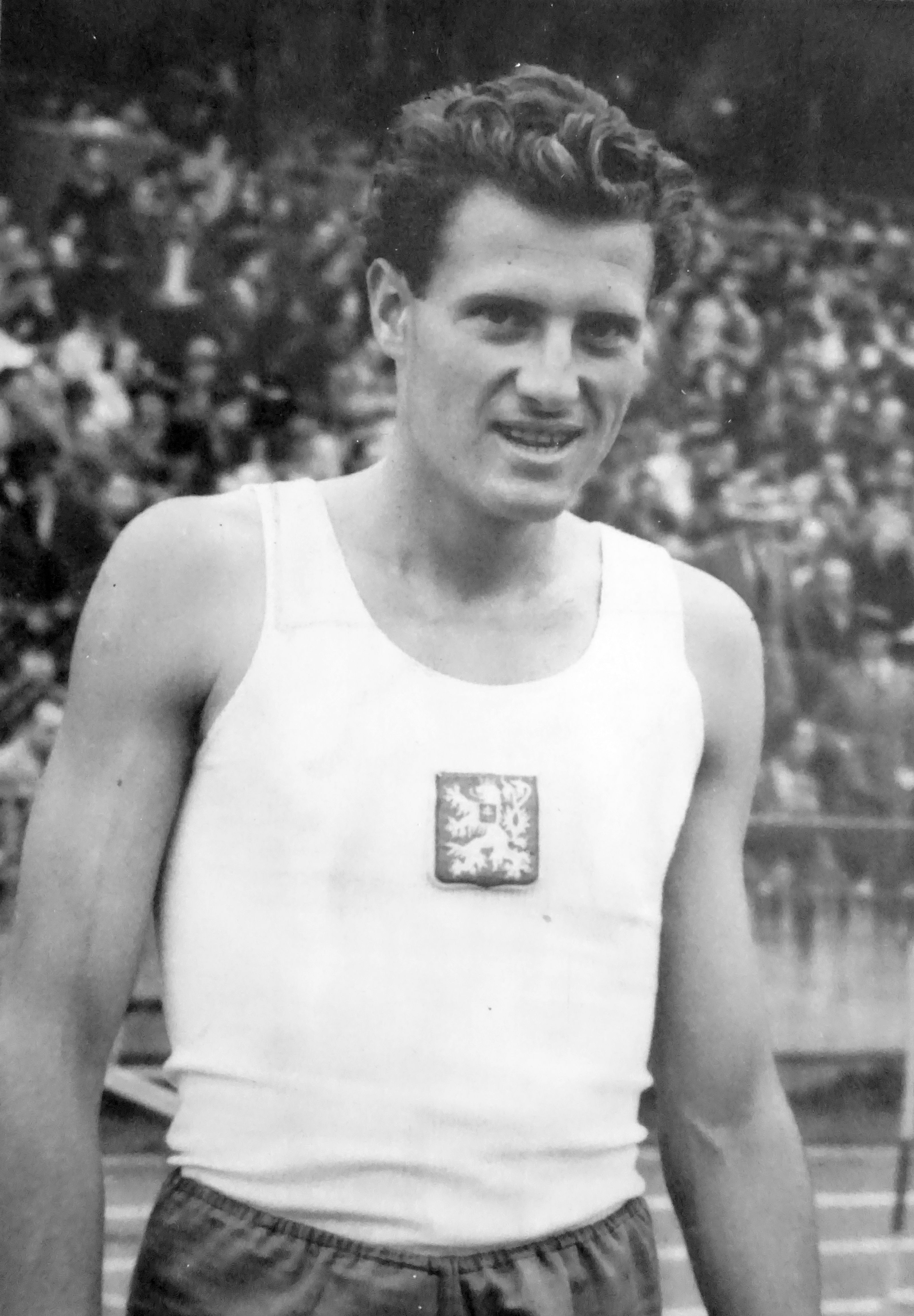
- 1947

Personal information
- Born: 27 February 1925 Brno, Czechoslovakia
- Died: 15 June 2016 (aged 91) Prague, Czech Republic

Sport
- Sport: Athletics
- Events: 110 m Hurdles; 400 m Hurdles
- Club: Moravská Slavia Brno 1941-1945; VSB Brno 1946-1947; Sokol Královo Pole (1948); Včela Brno (1949-1950); Dukla Prague (1950-1958)

Achievements and titles
- Personal bests: 110 m Hurdles – 14.6, 9 August 1951, Berlin; 400 m Hurdles - 54.1, 25 July 1949, Moscow)

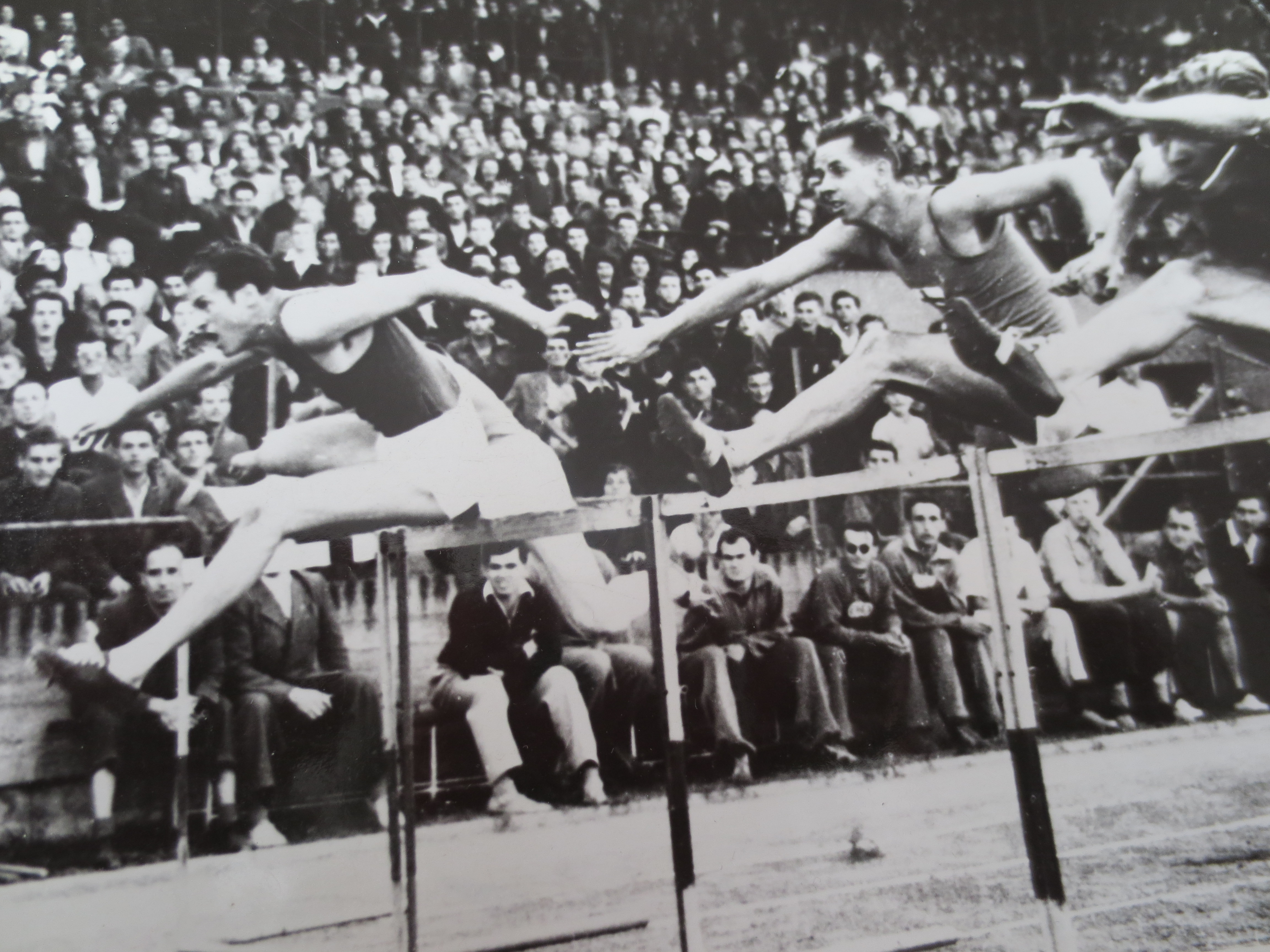
Milan Tošnar (first from left) wins 110 m Hurdles at 14.9 in Prague (29 August 1950, Czechoslovakia-Finland)

Milan Tošnar (27 February 1925 - 15 June 2016) was a Czech athlete (hurdler), coach and sports official. He was the first Czechoslovak runner for 110 metres Hurdles, which exceeded 15 seconds. Multiple representative of Czechoslovakia. Medalist in international university competitions.

== Education ==
Tošnar is a graduate of the Faculty of Education of Masaryk University in Brno in 1950 and in 1961 he successfully defended a candidate doctoral thesis at the Charles University in Prague.

== International competitions ==
Year	Competition	Venue	Position	Event	Notes
Representing Czechoslovakia
1946	European Athletics Championships	Oslo, Norway	Heat 2	110 m hurdles	15,4
1947	International University Games	Paris, France	2nd	110 m hurdles	15,2
1949	World Student Games UIE	Budapest, Hungary	2nd	110 m hurdles	15,1
1950	European Athletics Championships	Brusells, Belgium	Heat 3	110 m hurdles	15,2
1951	World Student Games UIE	Berlin, Germany	3rd	110 m hurdles	14,6

== Biography ==
In 1947, for the first time, he overcomes the Czechoslovak record in the course of the 110 m hurdles. He created a total of 11 Czechoslovak records, especially in the popular " through high fences" (best time 14.6, 9 August 1951, Berlin), 10x was the champion of the republic (six times 110 metres hurdles 1946-50 and 1954, twice 400 metres hurdles 1948-49, 4x100 m relay 1946 and 4x400 m relay 1951), and 24x represented Czechoslovakia (1946-1955). He was twice a participant in the European Championships (Oslo 1946 European Athletics Championships – Men's 110 metres hurdles, Brusells 1950 European Athletics Championships – Men's 110 metres hurdles) and achieved great achievements: Paris 1947 International University Games CIE (pre-Universiade), World Student Games (UIE) Budapest Athletics at the 1949 World Festival of Youth and Students, World Student Games (UIE) Berlin Athletics at the 1951 World Festival of Youth and Students

After finishing the active racing at the end of the 1950s, he became a trainer of the sprinters and hurdlers of Dukla Praha. He also works in the athletic association ČSTV (1959-1962) as chairman of the methodological committee. In 1960 he is the attendant of the Olympic Games in Rome like a coach. Since athletics in the mid-1960s he has moved to football. She becomes assistant to a trainer at football team Dukla Praha, responsible for athletic training. He won one of the last titles of the Czechoslovak Republic champion (1965/66), two Czechoslovak Cups (1966, 1969) and also walked with him to the semifinals of European Champion Clubs' Cup 1966–67 European Cup. In 1970-1983, he worked in management of Czechoslovak army sport (ends as a colonel).
