= Paul Crosfield =

Greek hurdler

Personal information
- Nationality: Greek
- Born: Pavlos Giorgios Homer Crosfield; 29 August 1929

Sport
- Sport: Track and field
- Event: 110 metres hurdles

Paul Crosfield (29 August 1929 – 27 May 2000) was a Greek hurdler. He competed in the men's 110 metres hurdles at the 1948 Summer Olympics.
