= Börje Rendin =

Swedish Olympic athlete

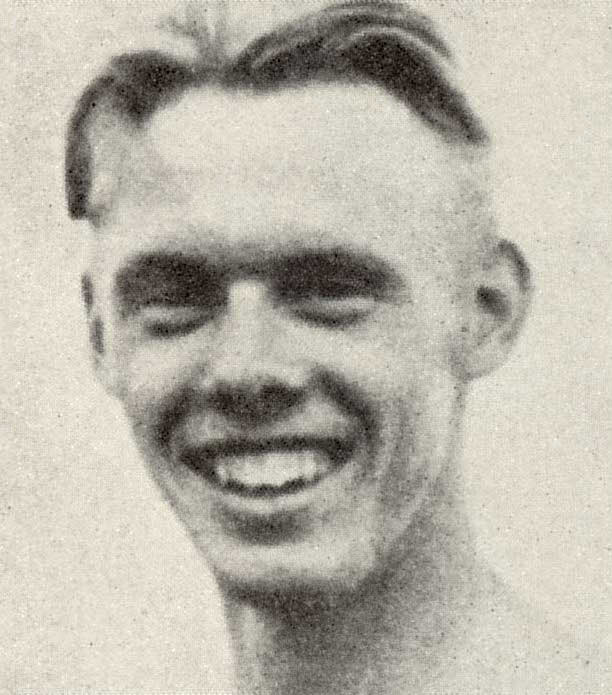

Personal information
- Born: 12 November 1921 Malmö, Sweden
- Died: 29 November 2016 (aged 95)
- Height: 196 cm (6 ft 5 in)
- Weight: 80 kg (176 lb)

Sport
- Sport: Athletics
- Events: Sprint, hurdles
- Club: Malmö Allmänna Idrottsförening

Achievements and titles
- Personal best: 110 mH – 14.6 (1948)

Börje Ingvar Rendin (12 November 1921 – 29 November 2016) was a Swedish sprinter. He competed at the 1948 Summer Olympics, where he was eliminated in the opening round of the 110 metres hurdles event. He was born in Malmö and competed for the Malmö Allmänna Idrottsförening, winning with them the Swedish 4 × 100 m title in 1943–44 and 1946–47.
