= Mazhar-Ul-Haque Khan =

Pakistani hurdler (1923–1997)

Personal information
- Nationality: Pakistani
- Born: 23 February 1923 Bareilly, Uttar Pradesh, India
- Died: 15 February 1997 (aged 73)

Sport
- Sport: Track and field
- Event: 110 metres hurdles

Mazhar-Ul-Haque Khan (23 February 1923 – 15 February 1997) was a Pakistani hurdler. He competed in the men's 110 metres hurdles at the 1948 Summer Olympics.

Khan was an admirer of British hurdler Donald Finlay, who was the 1936 Olympic silver medalist in the 110 m hurdles. After the 1948 Games, Ul-Haq Khan stayed in London and sought to break Finlay's records. He later worked in the cipher department at the Pakistan House in London. Splitting 15 seconds, he set a Pakistani national record in the 110 m hurdles.

Khan trained under Finlay's old coach Bill Thomas. He was a member of the Herne Hill Harriers and trained in Tooting Bec when not with the club. Thomas said that Khan had a "good chance" of lowering the British record in the 120 yards hurdles, which at the time was 14.7 seconds held by Finlay.

Khan sought selection to the English team at the 1950 British Empire Games (later called the Commonwealth Games), which Pakistan was not represented at. However, he was ultimately not given a birth and did not compete at the 1952 Olympic Games.

Khan died in London on 15 February 1997, aged 73.
