= James Johnston House (Half Moon Bay, California) =

- U.S. National Register of Historic Places
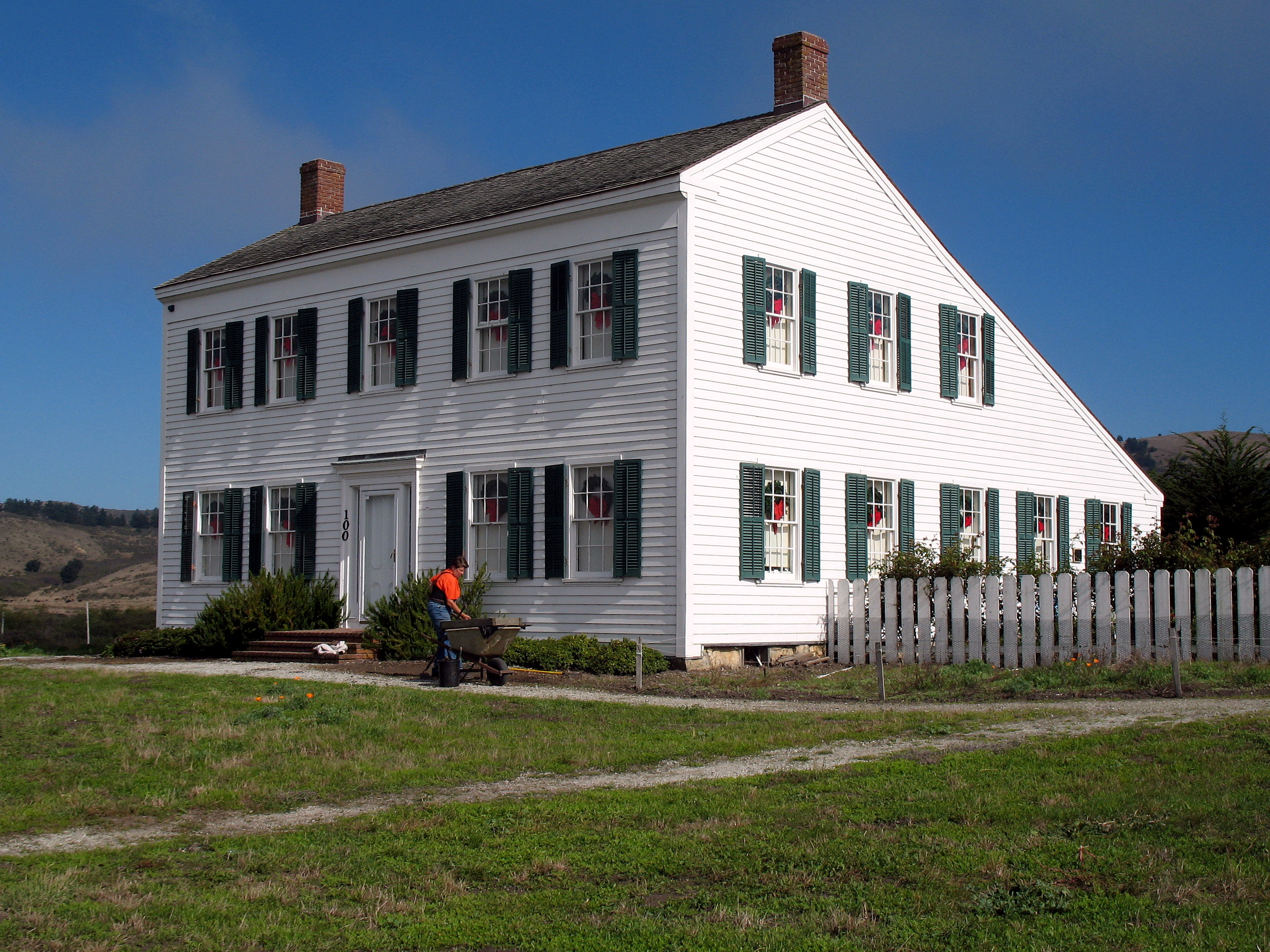

- Location within San Francisco Bay Area Location within California Location within the United States
- Location: 110 Higgins Canyon Road, Half Moon Bay, California, 94019
- Coordinates: 37°27′00″N 122°25′31″W
- Built: 1853; 173 years ago
- Architectural style: Saltbox house
- Restored by: Johnston House Foundation, Inc., Spanishtown Historical Society, city of Half Moon Bay
- Website: Official website
- NRHP reference No.: 73000446
- Added to NRHP: March 16, 1973

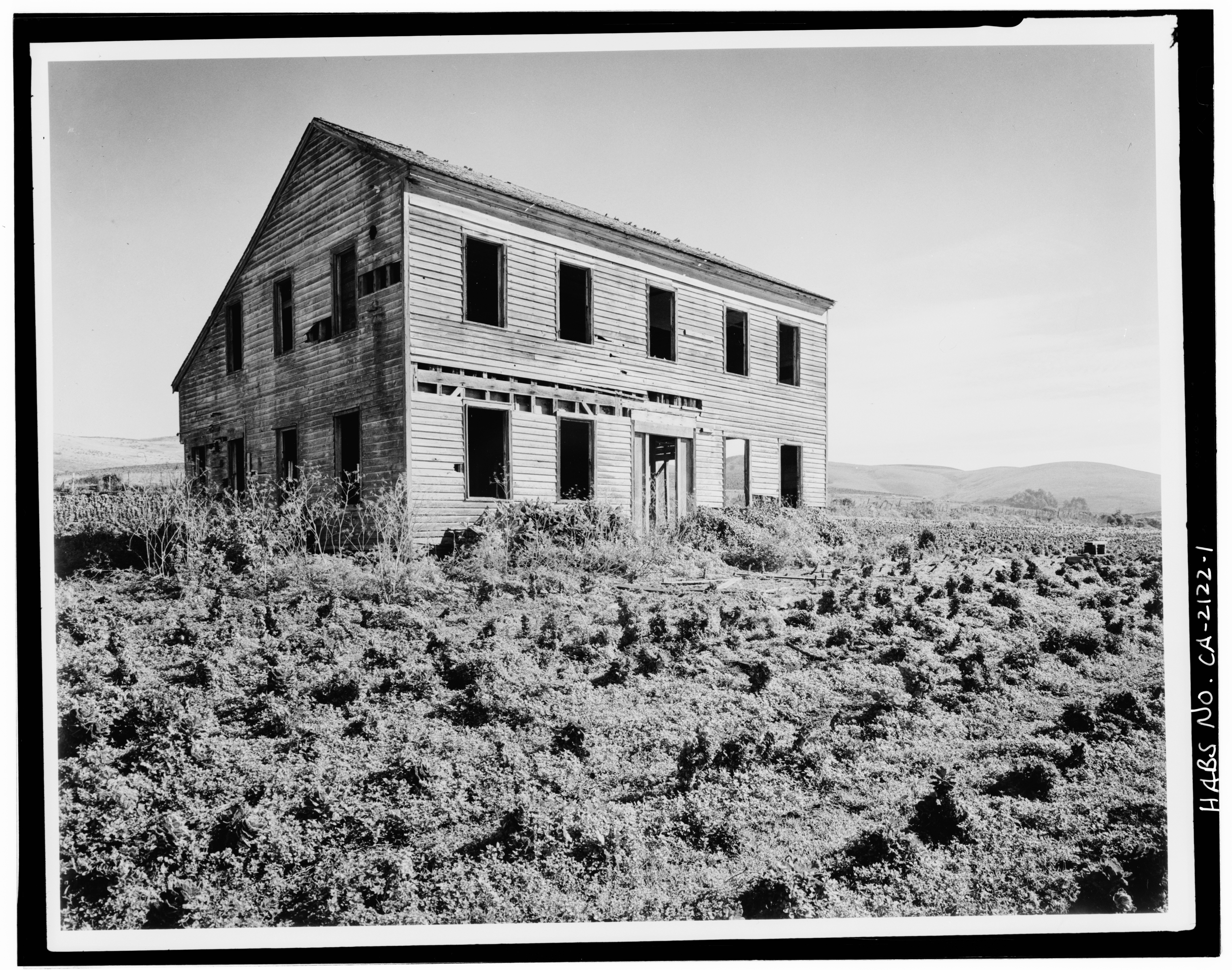
James Johnston House, photo taken after 1933 before restoration

James Johnston House was built between 1853 and 1855, and is a historical building in Half Moon Bay, California. Sometimes referred to as the "White House of Half Moon Bay". It is listed on the National Register of Historic Places since May 9, 1973. The building currently serves as a museum and community event space.

== History ==
=== The Johnston family ===
James P. Johnston (1813–1879) was from Scotland and came to the United States as a child, raised in Gallipolis, Ohio. Johnston moved to California around 1849, during the Gold rush. After having some success in mining, he was partner of the El Dorado Saloon in San Francisco (near Portsmouth Square at Kearny Street and Washington Street). In 1852, he married Petra Maria de Jara (1833–1861), she was from an early Californios family. He bought 1,162 acres of the south sections of Rancho Miramontes (also known as Rancho San Benito) once owned by Candelario Miramontes, to be used for a dairy farm.

After the purchase of land, Johnston began building the first wood-framed house along the San Mateo County coast, using a New England–style “saltbox” design. This was a largely Mexican community known as Spanishtown (or San Benito), and this architectural style was new and popular within the local community where most of the homes were previously made of adobe. The Johnston House is two stories tall, with hand hewn redwood timbers. The home was built with mortise and tenon construction and wooden pegs. There was a fenced garden around the house and quarters for travelers to stay in. The house had clear Spanish influence and featured a Roman Catholic chapel (something commonly seen in Californios homes) and an open gallery facing a patio. Food was prepared in a free-standing kitchen outside of the house, possibly to reduce odors or because of social factors with feeding many farm hands and/or having a Chinese cook.

James Johnston and his three brothers, John, William, and Thomas introduced dairy farming along the coast. By 1859, the Johnston Ranch comprised about half of the original Rancho Miramontes. They imported 800 eastern dairy cattle from Ohio to Half Moon Bay. Petra Johnston died at age 27, together they had five children. Petra's mother, Ursula Melita Valenzuela de Jara and James's sister Isabel Johnston moved into the house to raise three of the children. Johnston sold off most of his San Mateo County land after struggling with his finances. He died at the Commercial Hotel in San Francisco in October 1879, after losing much of his fortune. James' son, John F. Johnston inherited the house and did some repairs.

By 1900s, the house was in disrepair. In 1916, Angelo Cassinelli bought the property and grew brussels sprouts on the land, and the house was mostly uninhabited since it had no plumbing or electricity.

=== Restoration and present day ===
The house was abandoned by 1938. C. Malcolm Watkins, the chair of the Department of Cultural History at the Smithsonian Institution was vacationing in 1964, when he spotted the house. Watkins was taken by the architecture of the Johnston House, an example of cross cultural architecture of early California and he decided to work on the historic restoration beginning with research. Watkins’ published his research in the 1972 monograph, “The White House of Half Moon Bay. Preservationists in the area discovered Watkins’ monograph and formed the Johnston House Foundation, Inc..

Spanishtown Historical Society helped with the project. The city of Half Moon Bay acquired the estate title in 1975. Renovations on the house started in 1976. On November 26, 1976, a large wind storm happened and it blew down the original house into a pile of old wood. The home was put back together, and in the process, a new chimney was added (which was not original to the home) and a concrete foundation (the original home did not have a foundation).

The Johnston House is now a museum and is decorated with era-appropriate furnishings and Johnston family memorabilia, which had been donated by the heirs.

In January 2001, the Peninsula Open Space Trust (POST) purchased the 862-acre Johnston Ranch in order to protect the land from development.

== See also ==
- National Register of Historic Places listings in San Mateo County, California
