= Jim Vickers =

Indian hurdler

Personal information
- Nationality: Indian
- Born: James Henry Vickers; 7 December 1922 [Bandikui] British India
- Died: 6 December 2016 (aged 93) Brisbane, Australia

Sport
- Sport: Track and field
- Event: 110 metres hurdles

James Henry "Jim" Vickers (7 December 1922 – 6 December 2016) was an Indian hurdler. He competed in the men's 110 metres hurdles at the 1948 Summer Olympics.
