= Des Price =

Northern Irish athlete (born c.1937)

Personal information
- Nationality: British (Northern Irish)
- Born: c.1937

Sport
- Sport: Athletics
- Event: Hurdles
- Club: Queen's University Belfast AC

Desmond J. Price (born c.1937) is a former athlete from Northern Ireland, who represented Northern Ireland at the British Empire and Commonwealth Games (now Commonwealth Games).

== Biography ==
Price studied medicine at Queen's University Belfast and was a member of their athletics club. At the 1956 British Universities Championships, he finished third in the 120 yards hurdles.

He won the 120 yards hurdle title at the 1957 Northern Ireland AAA Championships and finished second behind Eamonn Kinsella in the 120 yards hurdles event during the international match against Scotland in September 1957.

After retaining his varsity title in May 1958, he won the hurdles event at the first trials at Paisley Park, with the view to going to the Empire Games.

Price was named by the Northern Ireland AAA in the final 1958 Northern Irish Team for the forthcoming Empire and Commonwealth Games. He subsequently competed at the 1958 British Empire and Commonwealth Games in Cardiff, Wales, participating in the one athletics event; the 120 yards hurdles.
