= Rancho Miramontes =

Mexican land grant in California

Coordinates: 37.450°N 122.420°W

Rancho Miramontes (also called Arroyo de los Pilarcitos, Miramontes Rancho de San Benito, and Rancho San Benito) was a 4,424-acre (17.90 km^{2}) Mexican land grant in present-day San Mateo County, California, given in 1841 by Governor Juan B. Alvarado to Juan Jose Candelario Miramontes. Arroyo de los Pilarcitos means "creek of little pillars." The grant extended along the Pacific coast from Pilarcitos Creek and present day Half Moon Bay south past Miramontes Point to Canada Verdes.

== History ==
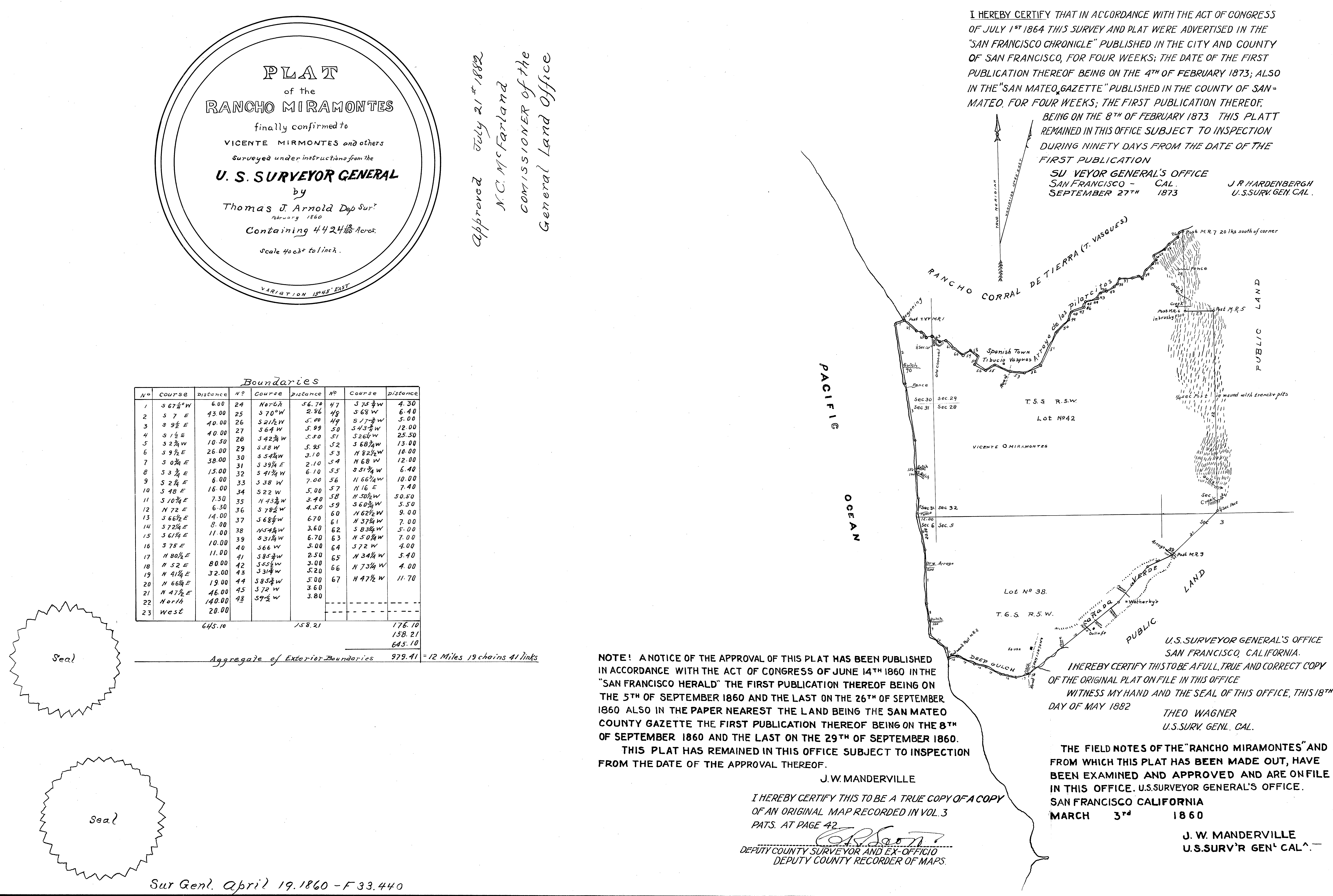
Plat of the rancho in 1860

Juan Jose Candelario Miramontes (1789–1846), came to Monterey with his parents in 1797 as part of the first settlers in Branciforte at Santa Cruz. Candelario Miramontes was a military officer at the Presidio of San Francisco, and he married Maria Guadalupe Briones (1793–1895) in 1808. In 1841 Governor Alvarado granted the one square league Rancho Arroyo de Los Pilarcitos (later called Rancho San Benito) to Juan Jose Candelario Miramontes. Candelario Miramontes remained in San Francisco and died there in 1846. His sons Jose Vicente Miramontes (born 1809) and Rodolfo (born 1820) took up residence on the rancho.

With the cession of California to the United States following the Mexican-American War, the 1848 Treaty of Guadalupe Hidalgo provided that the land grants would be honored. As required by the Land Act of 1851, a claim for Rancho Miramontes was filed with the Public Land Commission in 1852, and the grant was patented to Juan Jose Candelario Miramontes in 1882.

James P. Johnston (1813–1879), came from Ohio and after making money in the gold fields, returned to San Francisco and acquired an interest in a saloon, and began speculating in real estate. Johnston married Californio, Petra Maria de Jara in 1852. In 1853, Johnston purchased 1,162 acres (4.70 km^{2}) of Rancho Miramontes from the heirs of Candelario Miramontes. James invited his brothers, John, Thomas, and William to settle on the San Mateo County coast. The Johnston brothers continued to make additional purchases, and by 1859, the Johnston Ranch comprised about half of the original Rancho Miramontes. After the purchase of land, Johnston began building the first wood-framed house along the San Mateo County coast, using a New England–style "saltbox" design – named the James Johnston House.
