= Sydney Foster =

Jamaican hurdler

Personal information
- Born: 24 May 1921 Kingston, Colony of Jamaica, British Empire
- Died: 27 October 2007 (aged 86) Kingston, Jamaica

Sport
- Sport: Track and field
- Event: 110 metres hurdles

Sidney Frederick Foster (24 May 1921 – 27 October 2007) was a Jamaican hurdler. He competed in the men's 110 metres hurdles at the 1948 Summer Olympics.
