= Athletics at the 1958 British Empire and Commonwealth Games – Men's 120 yards hurdles =

Men's 120 yards hurdles at the Commonwealth Games

The men's 120 yards hurdles event at the 1958 British Empire and Commonwealth Games was held on 24 July at the Cardiff Arms Park in Cardiff, Wales.

== Medalists ==
Gold	Silver	Bronze
Keith Gardner; Jamaica	Jacobus Swart; South Africa	Ghulam Raziq; Pakistan

== Results ==
=== Heats ===
Qualification: First 3 in each heat (Q) qualify directly for the semifinals.

Wind:
Heat 3: +11.4 m/s

Rank	Heat	Name	Nationality	Time	Notes
1	1	Keith Gardner	Jamaica	14.4	Q
2	1	Peter Stanger	Canada	14.9	Q
3	1	Bob Birrell	England	15.0	Q
4	1	Des Price	Northern Ireland	15.2	
	1	Bob Shaw	Wales	DNS	
1	2	Ghulam Raziq	Pakistan	14.4	Q
2	2	Jacobus Swart	South Africa	14.5	Q
3	2	Thomas Obi	Nigeria	14.7	Q
4	2	Vic Matthews	England	14.9	
5	2	Momo Lansana	Sierra Leone	15.3	
1	3	Peter Hildreth	England	14.5	Q
2	3	Beresford Primrose	Australia	14.5	Q
3	3	John Duncan	Nigeria	14.8	Q
4	3	L. Hazlewood	British Guiana	15.5	
	3	I. Benjamin	Sierra Leone	DNS	
1	4	Jacobus Malan	South Africa	14.5	Q
2	4	Saka Oloku	Nigeria	14.5	Q
3	4	John Taitt	British Guiana	14.5	Q
4	4	Deryck Taylor	Jamaica	14.9	
5	4	Robin Brunyee	England	15.1	

=== Semifinals ===
Qualification: First 3 in each heat (Q) qualify directly for the final.

Wind:
Heat 1: ? m/s, Heat 2: +6.3 m/s

Rank	Heat	Name	Nationality	Time	Notes
1	1	Keith Gardner	Jamaica	14.3	Q
2	1	Peter Hildreth	England	14.5	Q
3	1	Ghulam Raziq	Pakistan	14.5	Q
4	1	John Duncan	Nigeria	14.6	
	1	Saka Oloku	Nigeria	DNF	
	1	Jacobus Malan	South Africa	DNF	
1	2	Jacobus Swart	South Africa	14.2	Q
2	2	Peter Stanger	Canada	14.5	Q
3	2	Beresford Primrose	Australia	14.5	Q
4	2	John Taitt	British Guiana	14.5	
5	2	Thomas Obi	Nigeria	14.7	
6	2	Bob Birrell	England	14.8	

=== Final ===
Wind: +3.5 m/s

Rank	Lane	Name	Nationality	Time	Notes
1st place, gold medalist(s)	4	Keith Gardner	Jamaica	14.20w	
2nd place, silver medalist(s)	1	Jacobus Swart	South Africa	14.30w	
3rd place, bronze medalist(s)	2	Ghulam Raziq	Pakistan	14.32w	
4	5	Peter Stanger	Canada	14.3w	
5	3	Peter Hildreth	England	14.4w	
6	6	Beresford Primrose	Australia	14.97w	
