= Väinö Suvivuo =

Finnish hurdler (1917–1985)

Personal information
- Born: 17 February 1917 Hamina, Finland
- Died: 2 May 1985 (aged 68) Lahti, Finland
- Height: 185 cm (6 ft 1 in)
- Weight: 79 kg (174 lb)

Sport
- Sport: Athletics
- Event: 110 m hurdles
- Club: Lahden Urheilijat

Achievements and titles
- Personal best: 14.6 (1953)
Medal record
Men's athletics
Representing Finland
European Championships
Bronze medal – third place	1946 Oslo	110 m hurdles

Väinö Armas Suvivuo (born Söderström; 17 February 1917 – 2 May 1985) was a Finnish hurdler who won a bronze medal over 110 m at the 1946 European Championships. He failed to reach the final at the 1952 Summer Olympics, where he served as the Finnish flag bearer at the opening ceremony.
