= C. Malcolm Watkins =

American historian

- Born: March 12, 1911; Malden, Massachusetts
- Died: January 12, 2001 (aged 89); Leesburg, Virginia
- Occupations: Curator; Archaeologist; American historian

C. Malcolm Watkins (1911–2001) was an American historian, archaeologist, and curator. He researched early American material culture, with a specific interest in the decorative arts. Watkins served as a head curator of the Department of Cultural History at the National Museum of American History at the Smithsonian Institution in Washington, D.C. He spent a total of 31 years working at the Smithsonian.

== Early life ==
C. Malcolm Watkins was born in 1911 in Malden, Massachusetts. His mother was Lura Woodside Watkins, decorative arts collector and researcher. His father was Charles H. Watkins, a pottery enthusiast who also participated in archaeological excavations in the region. Watkins mother would go on to donate her pottery collection to the Smithsonian Institution.

Watkins' married Joan Pearson Watkins in 1965. She was an honorary curator and researcher at the National Museum of American History, and a ceramist.

== Career ==
In 1934, Watkins received his Bachelor of Science from Harvard. After graduation he worked as a freelance writer writing about antiques. Two years later he started working as the first curator at the Wells Historical Museum in Southbridge, Massachusetts. He worked there from 1936 to 1948, taking time off to serve in the United States Air Force during World War II. He also briefly studied fine arts at Harvard, in 1936. Upon leaving the Wells, he started working at the United States National Museum as association curator in the Division of Ethnology in the Department of Anthropology. During this time he focused on managing the decorative arts and American technology collections. He also was a consultant for the Dana-Palmer House in 1948.

Watkins became the curator, and then supervisor and curator, of the Museum of History and Technology, starting in 1958. He focused on building the museums collection of material culture from the United States, with a focus on decorative arts like glass and ceramics. He became the first chairman of the department of Cultural History, which he helped gain departmental status. He was curator of Pre-Industrial History and Ethnic & Western History and in 1973 he became senior curator of the Department of Cultural History. He retired, holding that position, in 1980 and continued to serve emeritus until 1984.

He also was a professor in the American Studies department, during the 1960s, at The George Washington University. He was an active member of the Early American Industries Association, the National Trust for Historic Preservation, the Western History Association, the Society of Architectural Historians, the California Historical Society, and the American Association of Museums.

=== Notable museum work and research ===
Watkins worked on numerous exhibitions during his tenure as curator at the Smithsonian. In 1955 he curated "Folk Pottery of New England," which featured ceramics from his mother's collection. He developed the first exhibition hall, which opened in 1957, about early American everyday lives. He contributed to new exhibitions in the Museum of History and Technology, including "Growth of the United States," which included objects from early American life. He would continue to contribute to major permanent and temporary exhibitions through 1976. Watkins also collected for the Smithsonian. He acquired the Arthur and Edna Greenwood Collection, which features over 2,000 objects from colonial America.

He focused mainly on decorative arts in his own research. He wrote a monograph about North Devon pottery that was imported to America in the 17th century. Watkins and Pearson Watkins produced an oral history about folk pottery in Moore County, North Carolina, in 1965.

He was interested in early California history. Watkins’ published his research on the James Johnston House in the 1972 monograph, “The White House of Half Moon Bay", which eventually led to the restoration of the historical home.

=== Archeological contributions ===
Early archeological excavations included a colonial plantation at Marlborough, Virginia, an excavation that lasted from 1953 until 1969, and involved Frank M. Setzler. Watkins also started excavations at Jamestown, Virginia in 1955. He helped found the Society for Historic Archeology. In 1996 he was given the organizations Award of Merit for "original and pioneering," work in archaeology.

== Later life and legacy ==
Watkins live with his wife Joan Pearson Watkins in Reston, Virginia. He died on January 12, 2001, in Leesburg, Virginia. C. Malcolm Watkins archives are in the collection of the Smithsonian Institution Archives.
