= Gilbert Omnès =

French hurdler

Personal information
- Nationality: French
- Born: 22 June 1918
- Died: 1 September 1970 (aged 52)

Sport
- Sport: Track and field
- Event: 110 metres hurdles

Gilbert Omnès (22 June 1918 – 1 September 1970) was a French hurdler. He competed in the men's 110 metres hurdles at the 1948 Summer Olympics.
