= Aleksandr Yevgenievich Chudakov =

Russian physicist (1921–2001)

Aleksandr Chudakov
- Александр Чудаков
- Born: 16 June 1921; Russia
- Died: 25 January 2001 (aged 79); Moscow, Russia
- Education: Moscow State University
- Known for: Chudakov effect
- Scientific career
- Fields: Physicist
- Workplaces: Moscow State University; Chairman of the IUPAP Cosmic Ray Commission
- Doctoral advisor: S. N. Nernov

Aleksandr Evgenievich Chudakov (16 June 1921 – 25 January 2001) was a Soviet Russian physicist in the field of cosmic-ray physics, known for Chudakov Effect, the effect of decreasing ionization losses for narrow electron-positron pairs and for experimentally confirming existence of the transition radiation. He was also the chairman of the IUPAP Cosmic Ray Commission.

== Biography and scientific career ==
Aleksandr Chudakov was born on 16 June 1921, and graduated from Moscow State University (MSU) in 1948. In 1953, his experimental confirmation of the existence of the transition radiation, which was predicted by Ginzburg and Ilya Frank in 1945, and the effect of decreasing ionization losses for narrow electron-positron pairs, known as the Chudakov Effect, are among Chudakov's famous works. Phenomena similar to Chudakov Effect have been observed in quantum chromodynamics also.

Chudakov was the author of series of experiments carried out in the 1950s, which focused on investigation of the cosmic rays outside of the atmosphere with rockets and first satellites. As a result, during the third Soviet sputnik, he discovered the Earth's radiation belts in collaboration with Sergei Vernov.

In 1961, Chudakov and Georgy Zatsepin suggested the air Chernkov method for the gamma-ray astronomy and carried out a pioneering experiment at Katsively, Crimea.

From the mid-1960s Chudakov headed the design and construction of the Baksan Underground Scintillation Telescope, which was put into operation in 1978 and considered to be one of the first large multipurpose facilities for underground physics. In astroparticle physics the first class results have been obtained with this telescope which is still in operation.
