= Manuel Suárez (athlete) =

Spanish hurdler

Personal information
- Nationality: Spanish
- Born: 19 January 1920
- Died: 31 January 2001 (aged 81)

Sport
- Sport: Track and field
- Event: 110 metres hurdles

Manuel Suárez (19 November 1920 – 31 January 2001) was a Spanish hurdler. He competed in the men's 110 metres hurdles at the 1948 Summer Olympics.
