= Sergei Vernov =

Soviet physicist

Sergei Nikolaevich Vernov (11 July 1910 – 26 September 1982) was a Russian-Soviet physicist who pioneered the study of primary cosmic rays. He examined cosmic rays initially with high altitude balloons, then with ground observatories and then in space and found patterns in the distribution of ions in latitudinal belts and radiation belts at varying altitudes. Although he was the first to identify these radiation belts, they are better known in the Anglophone scientific world through the work of James van Allen and are termed Van Allen Radiation Belts.

== Early life and education ==
Vernov was born in Sestroretsk, where his father, Nikolai Stepanovich, worked in the postal department, and his mother, Antonina, was a mathematics teacher. He graduated from the Leningrad Polytechnic Institute in 1931 and joined the Radium Institute, where he began to study cosmic rays using radiosondes. He continued these studies and worked on his doctorate under D.V. Skobeltsyn and S.I. Vavilov at the Lebedev Institute of Physics, obtaining his degree in 1939.

== Career ==
During the war, he was involved in research at Kazan and returned to Moscow in 1943 to continue studies on cosmic rays. He became an assistant to D.V. Skobeltsyn at the Institute of Nuclear Physics, founded in 1946, and became its director in 1960. He established a long-term detector for ground-level cosmic radiation measurement and confirmed connections between radiation and solar sunspot cycles. He found variations with latitude (a reduction by a fourth at the equator) and the influence of the magnetic field in reducing the production of particle breakdown by cosmic rays. When the Soviet space program began, he started experiments with rockets and used a Geiger–Müller tube to study radiation on the Sputnik 2. His studies of particle interactions made him suspect the existence of particles other than the proton. Along with his students A. E. Chudakov, N. V. Pushkov, and S. S. Dolginov, they established, using measurements aboard satellites, that there were multiple ionized radiation belts between 20-60 thousand kilometres from the centre of the Earth with a trap formed by the magnetic field. These belts were also noticed independently by Van Allen, after whom they are named. The Americans exploded a nuclear bomb, Starfish Prime, at 400 km above Johnston Island in 1962, and this disrupted the inner radiation belts for years. It was thought for a while that the belts were man-made, creations of either country's secret weapons. Vernov and Lebedinsky suggested that the inner belt of protons was produced by nuclear bombardment and breakdown in the outer-belt. Vernov's group also identified the high energy electrons that were capable of destroying satellites.

== Legacy ==
A 2014 Russian satellite for the study of radiation was named Vernov.
