= Peter Hildreth =

British hurdler (1928–2011)

Personal information
- Nationality: British (English)
- Born: 8 July 1928 Bedford, England
- Died: 25 February 2011 (aged 82) Farnham, England
- Height: 183 cm (6 ft 0 in)
- Weight: 64 kg (141 lb)

Sport
- Sport: Athletics
- Event: hurdles/sprints
- Club: University of Cambridge AC; Achilles Club; Polytechnic Harriers
Medal record
Men's athletics
Representing Great Britain
European Championships
Bronze medal – third place	1950 Brussels	110 m hurdles

Peter Burke Hildreth (8 July 1928 – 25 February 2011) was a British hurdling athlete who competed at three Olympic Games.

== Biography ==
Born in Bedford, he was the son of Wilfred Hildreth, who represented British India at the 1924 Summer Olympics in athletics. His education was in St Paul's School, Darjeeling and Downing College, Cambridge.

Hildreth became the British 120y hurdles champion after winning the British AAA Championships title at the 1950 AAA Championships. The following month, he won the bronze medal in the 1950 European Championships in spite of a poor lane draw on a wet track.

In June 1952, he became the first ever British champion over the new hurdles distance of 220 yards at the 1952 AAA Championships. Shortly afterwards he represented the Great Britain team at the 1952 Olympic Games in Helsinki, reaching the semi-finals of the 110 metre hurdles.

Three more AAA titles came his way at the 1953 AAA Championships (120y), the 1954 AAA Championships (220y) and the 1956 AAA Championships (120y) before he was selected for his second Olympics. At the 1956 Olympic Games in Melbourne, Hildreth competed in the 110 metres hurdles competition.

Hildreth represented the England team at the 1958 British Empire and Commonwealth Games in Cardiff, reaching the final of the 120 yards hurdles. and a third appearance ensued at the 1960 Rome Games.

He equalled the British record for the 110 metre hurdles, with a time of 14.3 seconds, on five occasions.

Hildreth won the 110m (then 120 yards) hurdles event in 14.5 sec. at the AAA championships in the White City on 14 July 1956. He finished the final race only 0.1 sec. ahead of Ion Opris, the Romanian champion, who created a major stir by running straight off the track and out of the stadium to claim political asylum in Britain.

He represented the England athletics team in the 120 yards hurdles at the 1958 British Empire and Commonwealth Games in Cardiff, Wales.

Following his retirement from athletics, he served as an athletics journalist, writing for the Sunday Telegraph and commentating on events for BBC Radio. Hildreth, in July 2008, at age 80, was banned from running up an escalator in the Elphicks Farnham department store on safety grounds.

Hildreth died on 25 February 2011 at the age of 82.
