= Raymond Barkway =

British athlete 1924–1956

Personal information
- Nationality: British (English)
- Born: 24 August 1924 Uxbridge, England
- Died: 1 July 1956 (aged 31) Prees Heath, England

Sport
- Sport: Athletics
- Event: Sprint Hurdles
- Club: University of Oxford AC; Achilles Club

Raymond Charles Barkway (24 August 1924 – 1 July 1956) ran the 110M high hurdles for Great Britain in the 1948 London Olympics.

== Biography ==
Barkway was born in Uxbridge, England and was educated at Watford Boys Grammar School and Exeter College, Oxford gaining his blue in 1948.

While coaching at Loughborough College during Summer School, he represented the Great Britain team at the 1948 Olympic Games in London, where he competed in the 110 metres hurdles event.

Barkway finished second behind Peter Hildreth in the 120 yards hurdles event at the 1950 AAA Championships.

In 1951, Barkway won a bronze medal at the World Student Games in Luxembourg. Barkway was a Chemistry teacher at Clifton College, Bristol and fired the starting pistol when Roger Bannister broke the Four-minute mile at Iffley Road Athletics Track in 1954.

He was killed aged 31 years old, when his Royal Navy Gruman Avenger Torpedo Bomber crashed, he was piloting it for the Royal Naval Volunteer Reserve.
