= Edvin Frigast Larsen =

Danish footballer (1899-1962)

Personal information
- Date of birth: 20 December 1899
- Place of birth: Copenhagen, Denmark
- Date of death: 25 November 1962 (aged 62)
- Position: Goalkeeper

Senior career*
Years	Team	Apps	(Gls)
1917–1934	Akademisk Boldklub		

International career
1921–1929	Denmark	22	(0)
- * Club domestic league appearances and goals

Edvin Frigast Larsen (20 December 1899 – 25 November 1962) was a Danish footballer who played as a goalkeeper. He made 22 appearances for the Denmark national team from 1921 to 1929.
