= Craig Dixon =

American hurdler (1926–2021)

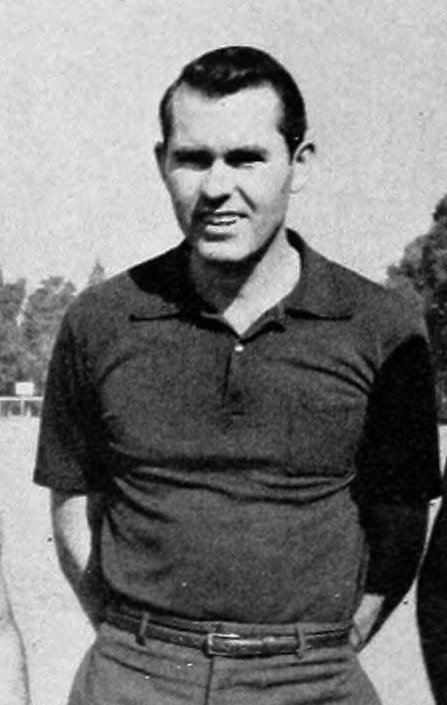
- Dixon in 1960

Personal information
- Full name: Craig Kline Dixon
- Born: March 3, 1926 Los Angeles, California, U.S.
- Died: February 25, 2021 (aged 94) Westwood, California, U.S.
- Height: 6 ft 2 in (188 cm)
- Weight: 159 lb (72 kg)
Medal record
Men's athletics
Representing the United States
Olympic Games
Bronze medal – third place	1948 London	110 m hurdles

Craig Kline Dixon (March 3, 1926 – February 25, 2021) was an American athlete who competed mainly in the 110 meter hurdles. He competed for the United States in the 1948 Summer Olympics held in London, Great Britain in the 110 meter hurdles where he won the bronze medal. Dixon was born in Los Angeles, California.

Dixon ran for the UCLA Bruins track and field program, where he won an NCAA title in the 220 yards hurdles.
