= Pol Braekman =

Belgian sprinter

Personal information
- Nationality: Belgian
- Born: 22 November 1919
- Died: 15 November 1994 (aged 74)

Sport
- Sport: Sprinting
- Event: 100 metres
Medal record
Men's athletics
Representing Belgium
European Championships
Silver medal – second place	1946 Oslo	110 m hurdles

Pol Braekman (22 November 1919 – 15 November 1994) was a Belgian sprinter. He competed in the men's 100 metres at the 1948 Summer Olympics.

Braekman won the British AAA Championships title in the 120 yards hurdles event at the 1946 AAA Championships and 1947 AAA Championships.
