= André-Jacques Marie =

French hurdler (born 1925)

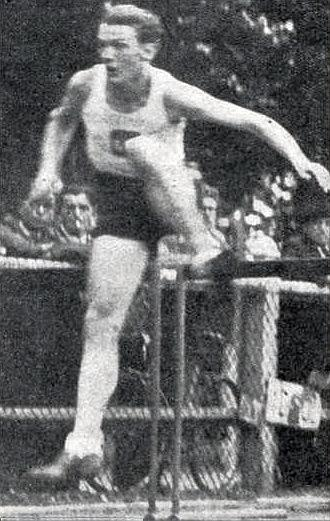
- André-Jacques Marie

Medal record

Men's athletics

Representing France

European Championships
Gold medal – first place	1950 Brussels	110 m hurdles

André-Jacques Marie (born 14 October 1925 in Cap-d'Ail) is a French former hurdler who competed in the 1948 Summer Olympics.
