= Bellini =

Bellini is an Italian surname, formed as a patronymic or plural form of Bellino.

== People ==
- Family of Italian painters:
  - Jacopo Bellini (c. 1396–c. 1470), father of Gentile and Giovanni
  - Gentile Bellini (c. 1429–1507)
  - Giovanni Bellini (c. 1430–1516), the most famous of the three
- Adriano Bellini (born 1942), known as Kirk Morris, Italian former bodybuilder and actor
- Andrea Bellini, Italian operatic bass, active in the nineteenth century
- Andrea Bellini, Italian contemporary art curator
- Barb Bellini (born 1977), retired Canadian female volleyball player
- Bellino Bellini (1741–1799), Italian painter
- Claudio Bellini (born 1963), Italian architect and designer
- David Bellini (1972–2016), Italian screenwriter, television writer, story editor and docu-director
- Delfo Bellini (1900–1953), Italian football player
- Elma Bellini (1954–2018), American judge
- Filippo Bellini (fl. 1594), Italian painter
- Francesco Bellini (1947–2025), Canadian entrepreneur
- Giacinto Bellini (17th century), Italian painter
- Gianfranco Bellini (1924–2006), Italian actor and voice actor
- Giancarlo Bellini (born 1945), Italian former road bicycle racer
- Gianmarco Bellini (born 1958), Italian Air Force officer
- Gianpaolo Bellini (1935–2026), Italian physicist
- Gianpaolo Bellini (born 1980) an Italian football player
- Hilderaldo Bellini (1930–2014), Brazilian football player, captain of the first Brazilian team to win the FIFA World Cup
- Isa Bellini (1922–2021), Italian actress
- Italo Bellini (1915–1965), Italian sports shooter
- Jarrett Bellini (born 1978), American writer
- Jason Bellini, American journalist
- Lorenzo Bellini (1643–1704), Italian physician and anatomist
- Mario Bellini (born 1935), Italian architect
- Mark Bellini (born 1964), former American football wide receiver in the National Football League
- Mattia Bellini (born 1994), Italian rugby union player
- Paul Bellini (born 1963), Canadian comedy writer and television actor
- Raffaello Bellini (1874–1930), Italian zoologist
- Santiago Bellini Noya (born 1996), Uruguayan football player
- Savino Bellini (1913–1974), Italian footballer
- Vincenzo Bellini (1801–1835), Italian opera composer
