= Stazione Zoologica Anton Dohrn =

Biological research institute in Naples, Italy

Coordinates: 40.8327°N 14.2358°E

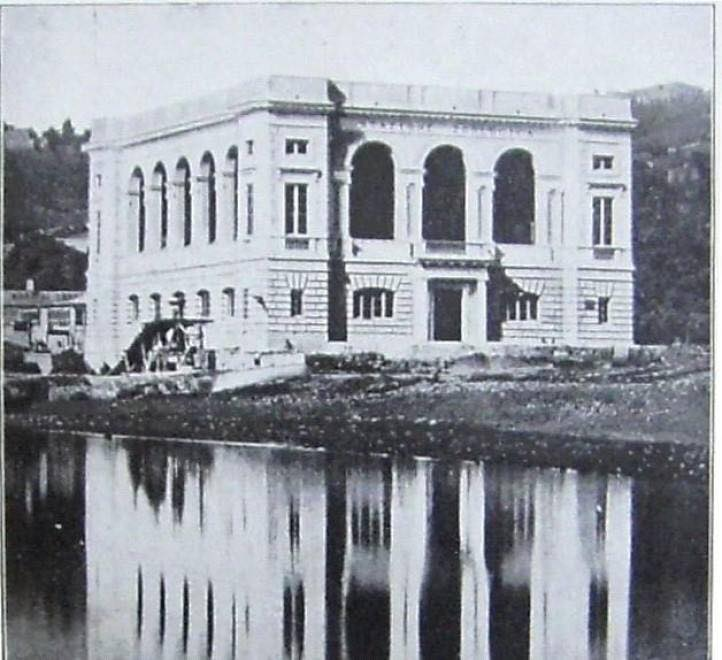
Stazione Zoologica in 1873

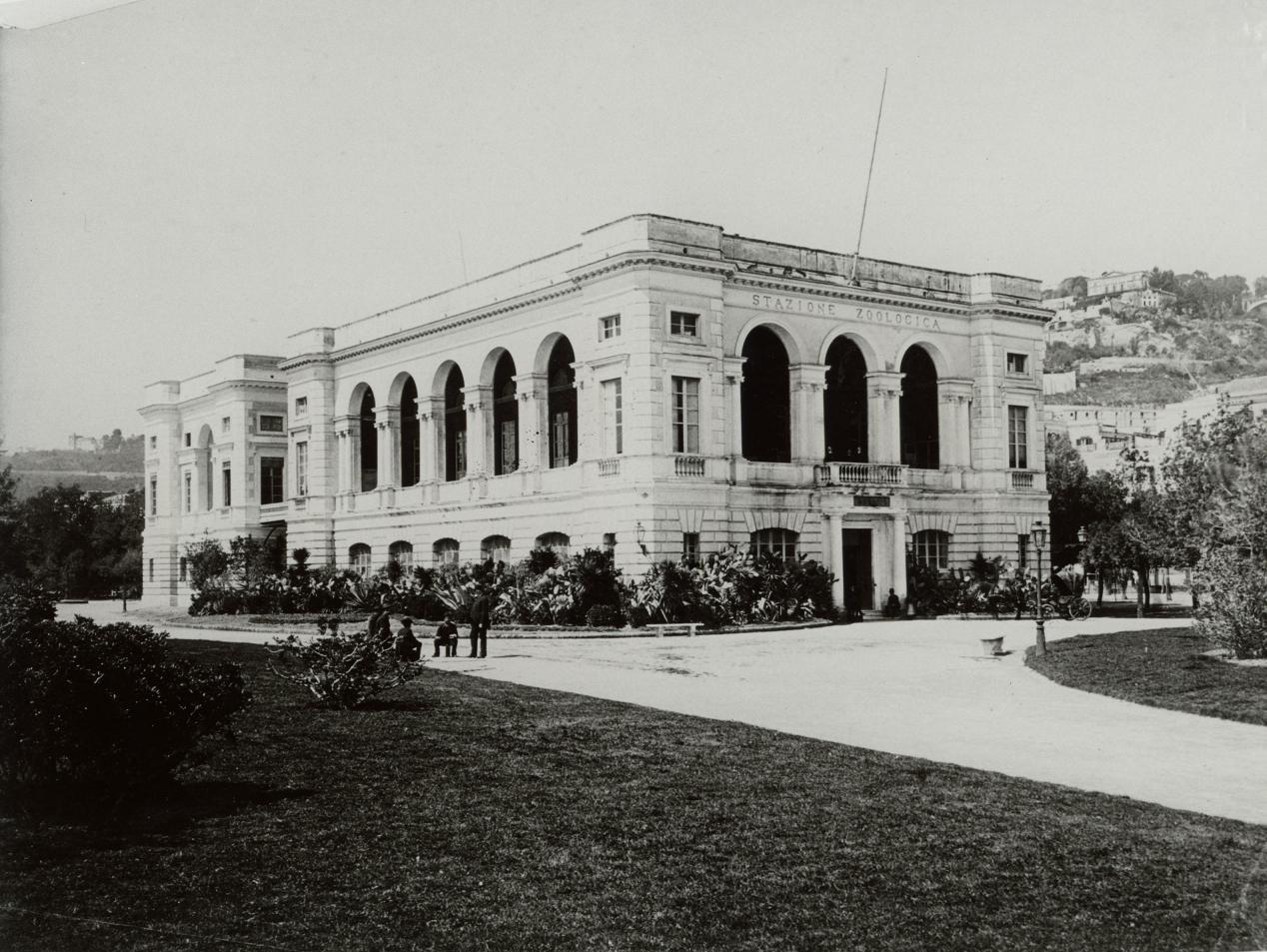
Stazione Zoologica in the 1890s

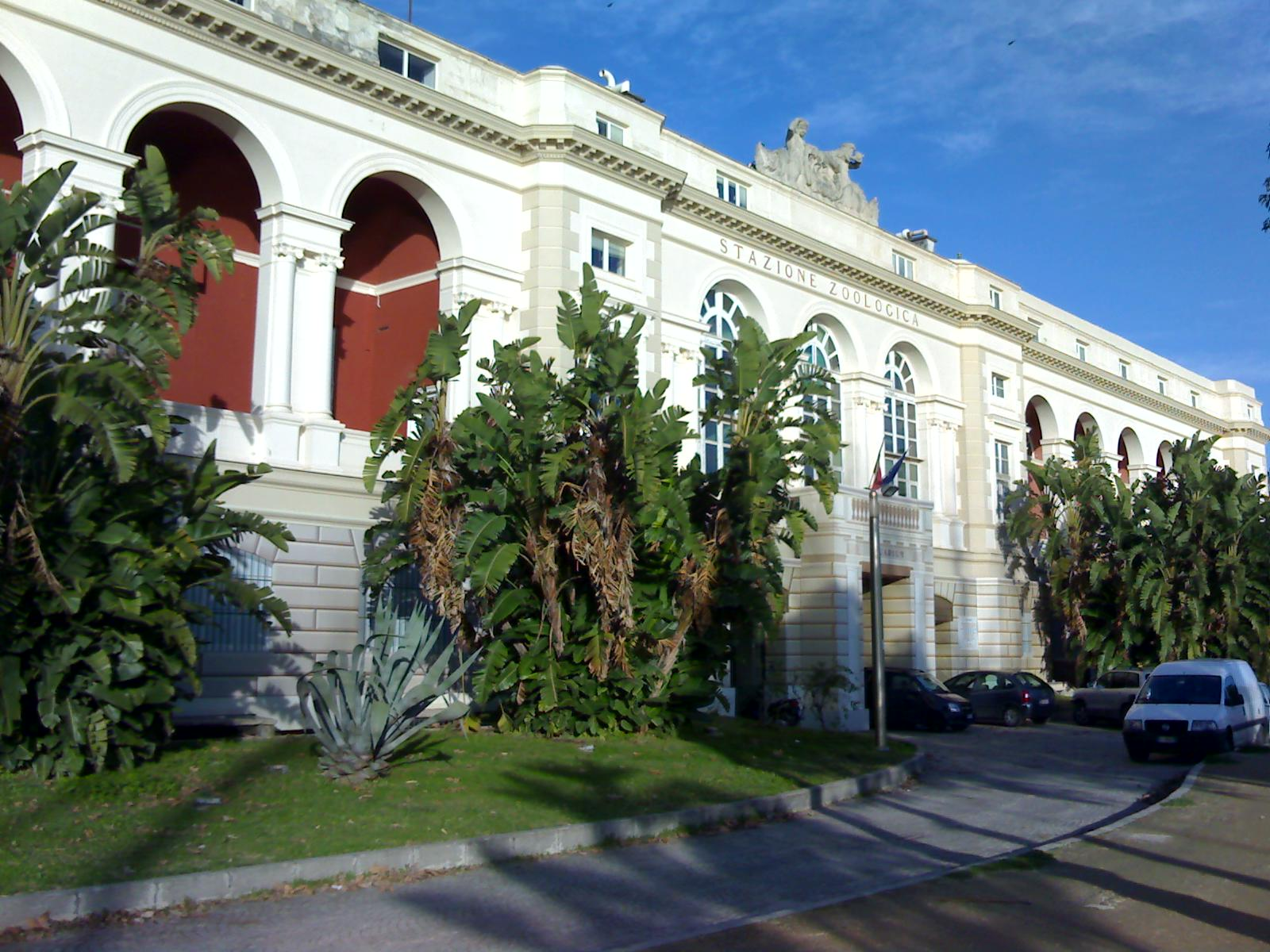
Stazione Zoologica in 2010

The Stazione Zoologica Anton Dohrn is a research institute in Naples, Italy, devoted to basic research in biology. Research is largely interdisciplinary involving the fields of evolution, biochemistry, molecular biology, neurobiology, cell biology, biological oceanography, marine botany, molecular plant biology, benthic ecology, and ecophysiology.

Founded in 1872 as a private concern by Anton Dohrn, in 1982 the Stazione Zoologica came under the supervision and control of the Ministero dell'Università e della Ricerca Scientifica e Tecnologica (Ministry of Universities and Scientific and Technological Research) as a National Institute.

== History ==
=== The idea ===
Dohrn's idea was to establish an international scientific community provided with laboratory space, equipment, research material and a library. This was supported and funded by the German government, Thomas Henry Huxley, Charles Darwin, Francis Balfour and Charles Lyell among others. Dohrn provided a substantial sum himself. Running costs were paid from income derived from Dohrn's bench system, the sale of scientific journals and specimens and the income from the public aquarium. This system was an important innovation in management of research and it worked. When Dohrn died in 1909, more than 2,200 scientists from Europe and the United States had worked at Stazione Zoologica and more than fifty tables-per-year had been rented out.

"Report of the Committee, consisting of Dr. Anton Dohrn, Professor Rolleston and Mr. P. L. Sclater, appointed for the purpose of promoting the Foundation of Zoological Stations in different parts of the World:—Reporter, Dr. Dohrn [Jena]."-"The Committee beg to report that since the last Meeting of the British Association at Liverpool steps have been taken by Dr. Dohrn to secure the moral assistance of some other scientific bodies, and that the Academy of Belgium has passed a vote acknowledging the great value of the proposed Observatories. Besides this, the Government at Berlin has given instruction to the German Embassy at Florence and to the General Consul at Naples to do everything to secure success to Dr. Dohrn's enterprise. Next October the building at Naples will be commenced under the personal superintendence of Dr. Dohrn, who will be accompanied by the assistant architect of the Berlin Aquarium. The contractors agree to finish the building in one year, so that in January 1873 the Aquarium in Naples may be expected to be in working order." British Association for the Advancement of Science Report on the 1871 Meeting in Edinburgh

=== The building ===
The oldest building of the zoological station was opened in 1874. A second building connected to the western end of the first by bridges was added in 1886 and a third was built in 1906 for the new science of comparative physiology. In 1910, the 1874 building was occupied by the public aquarium and the library only, the department for collecting and preserving organisms as well as the individual laboratories for zoologists having been relocated in the 1886 addition.

=== People ===
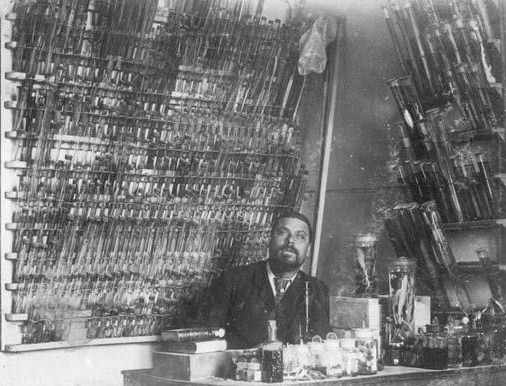
Salvatore Lo Bianco in November 1889. His preservation methods were so advanced that collections of preserved marine organisms were sold to clients from all over the world See text accompanying this image for technique

The first assistants were zoologists Nicolaus Kleinenberg and Hugo Eisig and one of the Preparators was Salvatore Lobianco (Lo Bianco) (1860–1910), who wrote The Methods Employed at the Naples Zoological Station for the Preservation of Marine Animals. Others were Dr. Brandt (librarian); Dr. Lang; Dr. Giesbrecht; Petersen (engineer).

By 1910, the permanent staff were Professor Dr. Paul Mayer and Dr. Gross, morphology; Dr. Burian, comparative physiology; Dr. Henze, chemistry; Dr. Gast, the museum; Hermann Linden, secretary; Sig. Santorelli, Preparator. Zoologists and morphologists were the first guests of the new institute. Included were Heinrich Wilhelm Gottfried von Waldeyer-Hartz, Francis Balfour, Ray Lankester, August Weismann, Giovanni Battista Grassi, Antonio della Valle, Oskar Schmidt, Ambrosius Hubrecht (Professor of Utrecht University, an embryologist).

In 1897, Ida Henrietta Hyde was invited to occupy a table at the institute. She went on to fund raise to help establish the American Women's Table at the Stazione Zoologica Anton Dohrn. This table was subsequently held by American women zoologists such as Emily Ray Gregory.

=== Publications ===
The three publications issued by the Station were:

- Mittheilungen der Zoologischen Station in Neapel
- Zoologischer Jahresbericht, a reference journal known for its rapid publication and accuracy
- Fauna und Flora des Golfes von Neapel, an inventory of the biota of Mediterranean (in 1876, Anton Dohrn added a section of Botany)
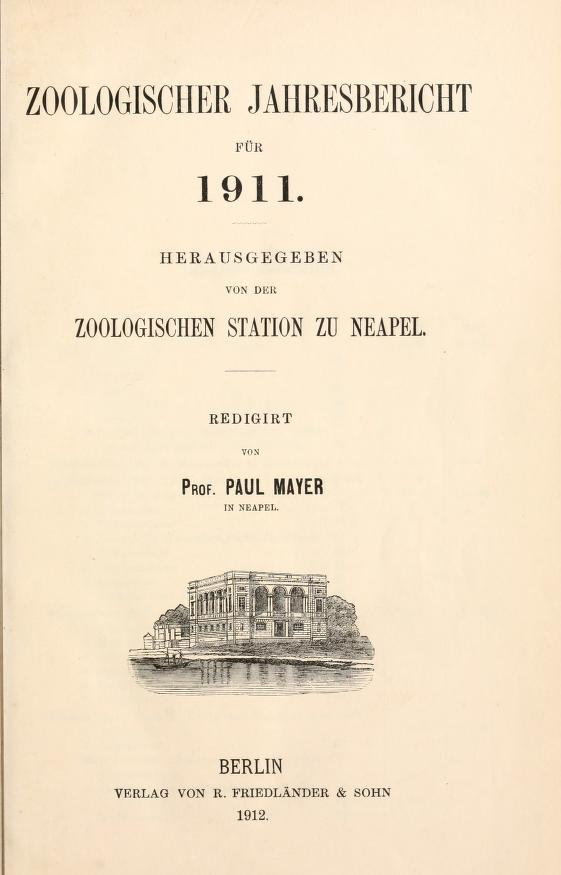
Zoologischer Jahresbericht 1911

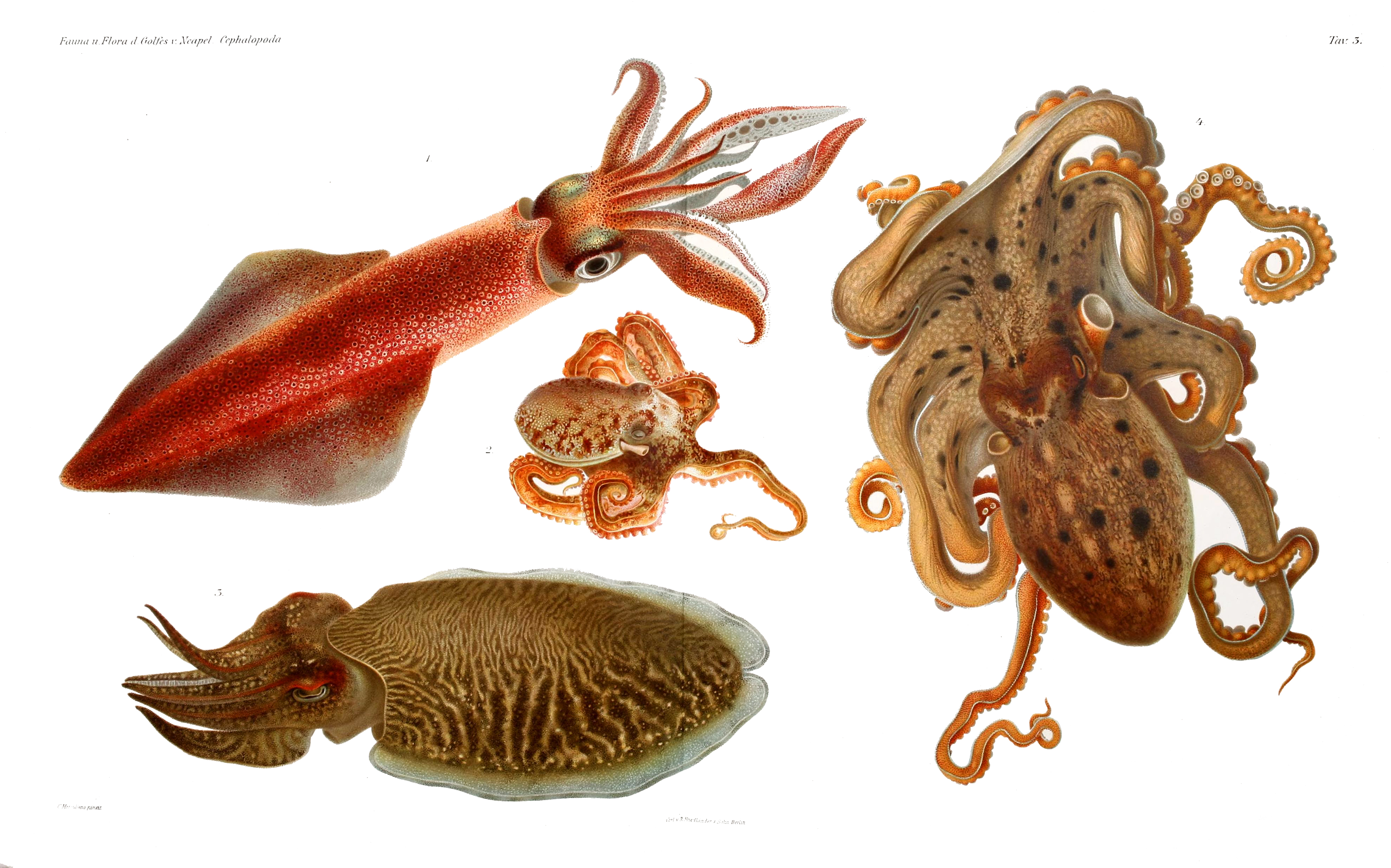
Plate from Cefalopodi Viventi nel Golfo di Napoli Fauna und Flora des Golfes von Neapel

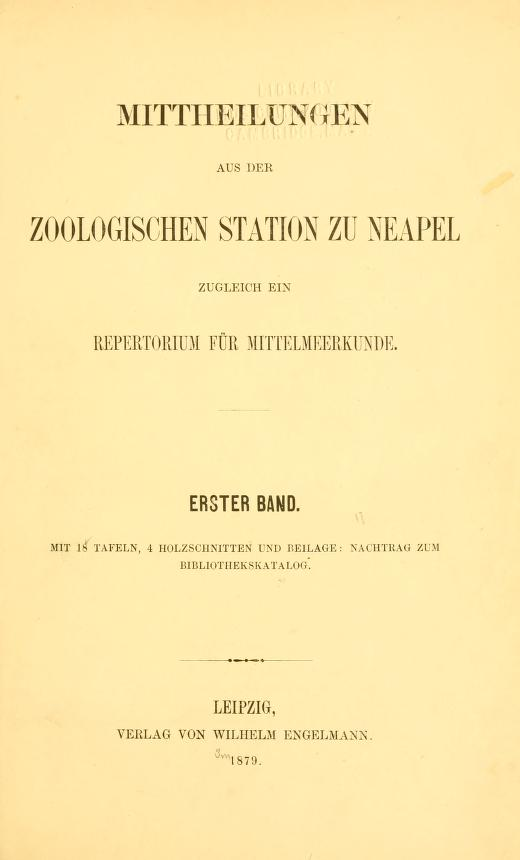
Mittheilungen der Zoologischen Station in Neapel1879

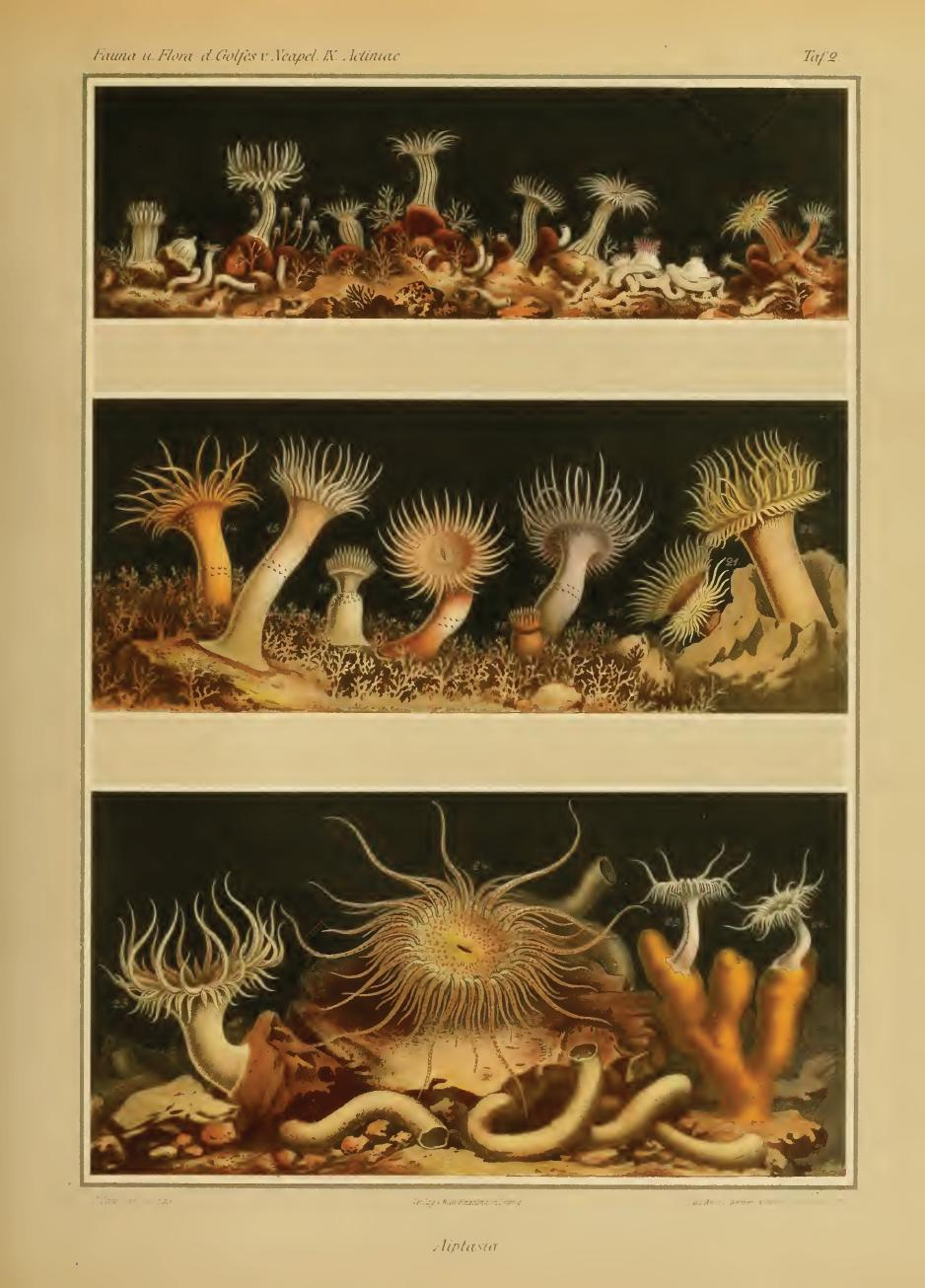
Plate from Le Attinie Monografia del Angelo Andres Fauna und Flora des Golfes von Neapel

=== Library ===
Charles Darwin had advised Dohrn that establishing a library would be unwise (Groeben, 1982, p. 29). Dohrn argued that availability of all the major published sources was essential. He gave his own books and scientific journals to the Station and persuaded publishers and scientists to donate their publications. The Naples Station's biological reference collection is still unrivalled in Europe today. The first librarian was Emil Schoebel.

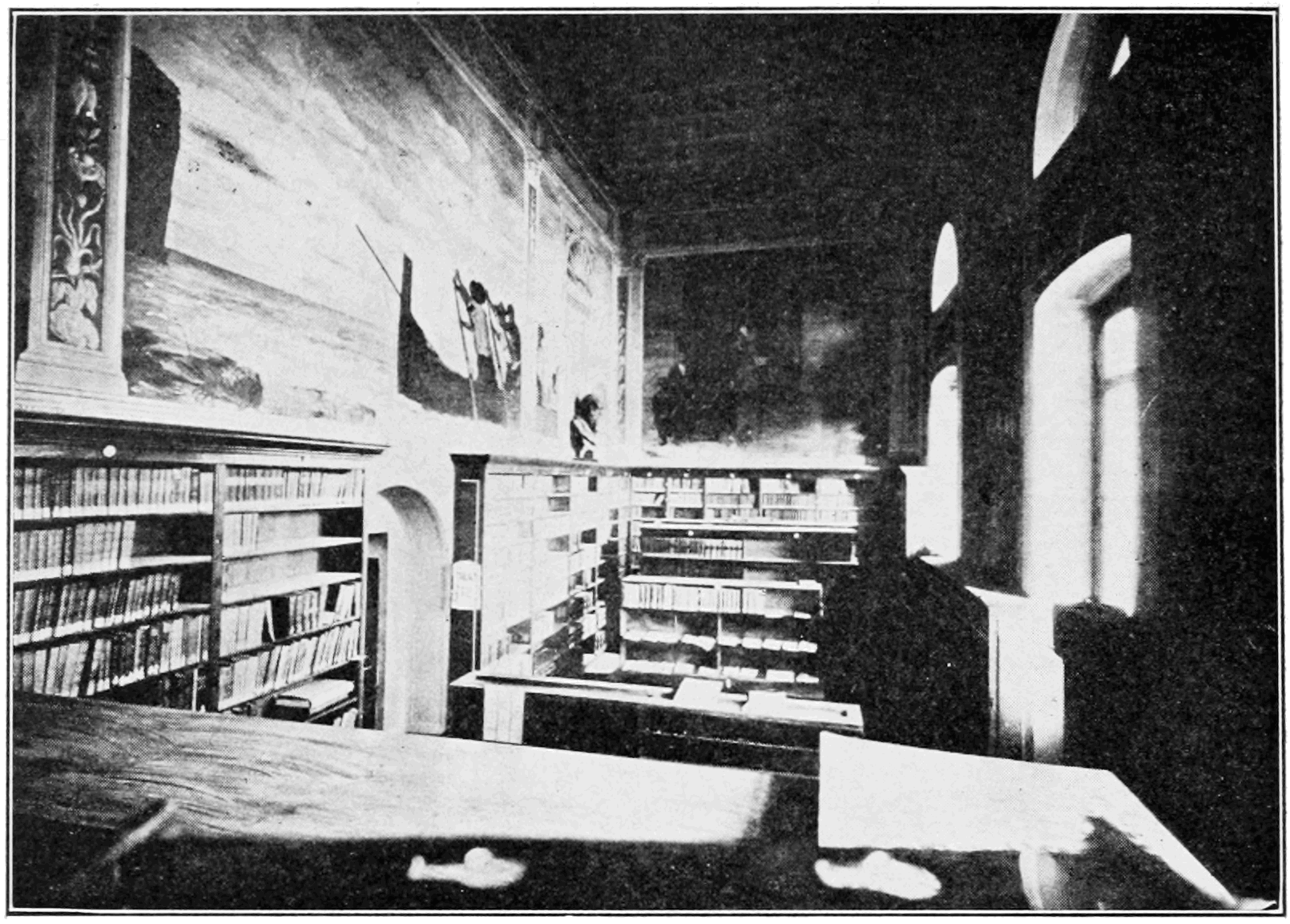
View of the library facing east

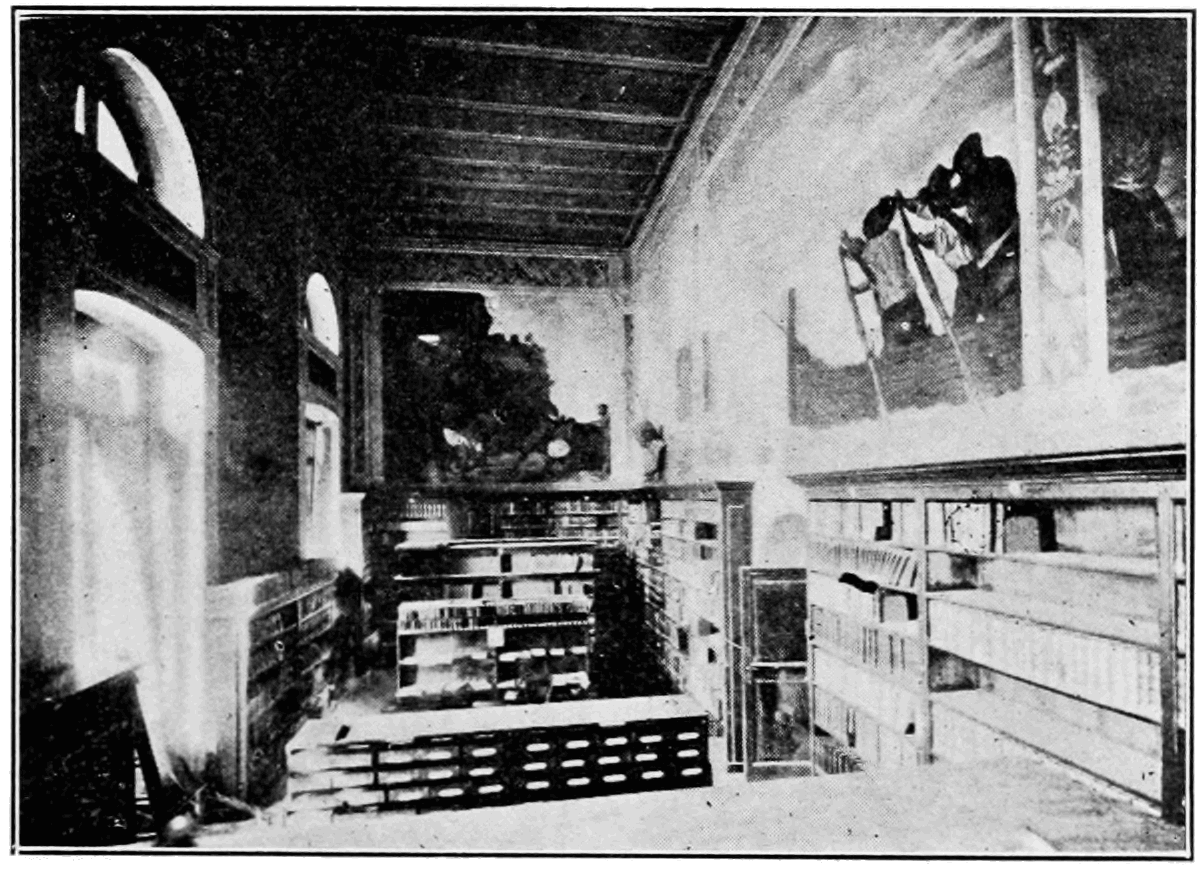
View of the library facing east

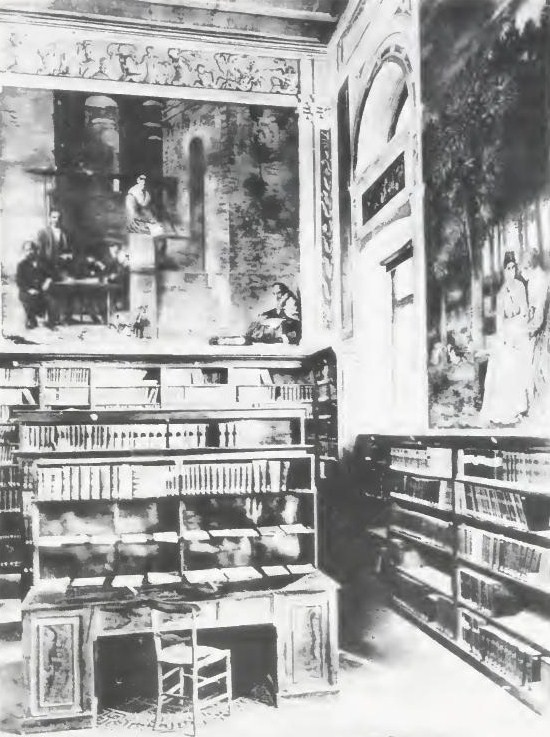
Corner with frescos

=== Equipment ===
The station maintained a high level of technical services. Ernst Abbe (1840–1905) of the Zeiss factory, a close friend, supplied sets of Zeiss instruments at low prices, thus bringing Zeiss equipment, sometimes improved, to the attention of the international scientific community. Assistants and guests collaborated in improving section-cutting and staining. For collecting, there were several crewed boats, including the steamers "Johannes Muller" and "Francis Balfour". An engineer and assisting machinists maintained the aquarium and a trained mechanic made instruments for experimental investigations.

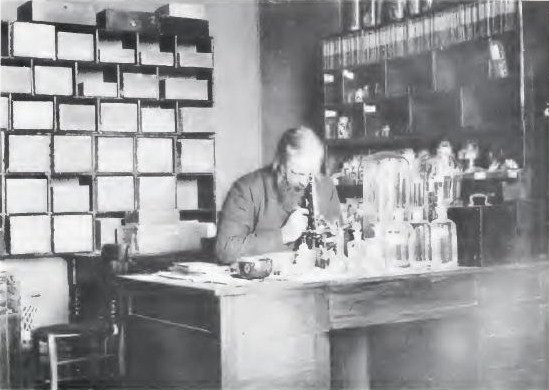
Anton Dohrn with a Zeiss microscope

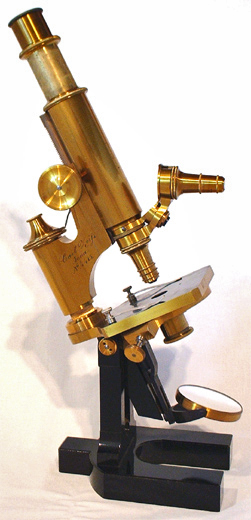
Microscope made by Zeiss, Jena in 1879

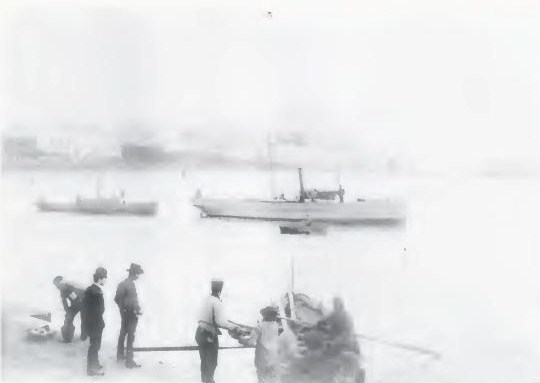
the Johannes Muller and the Frank Balfour

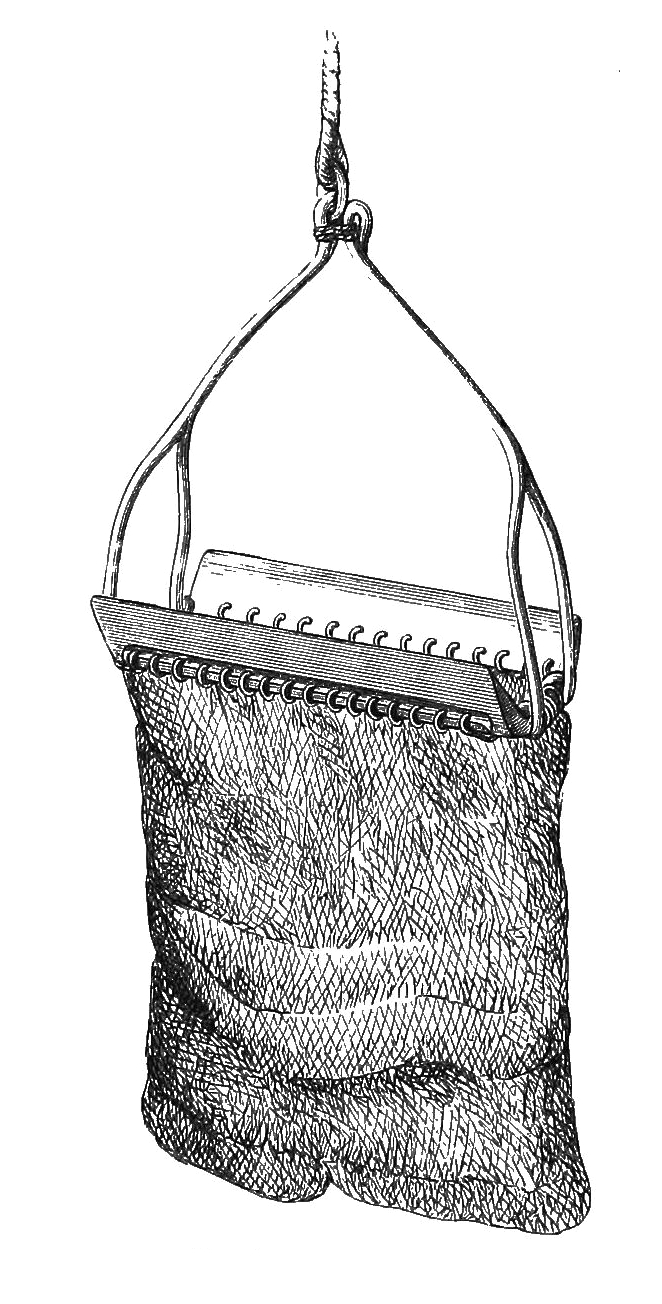
Naturalist's dredge

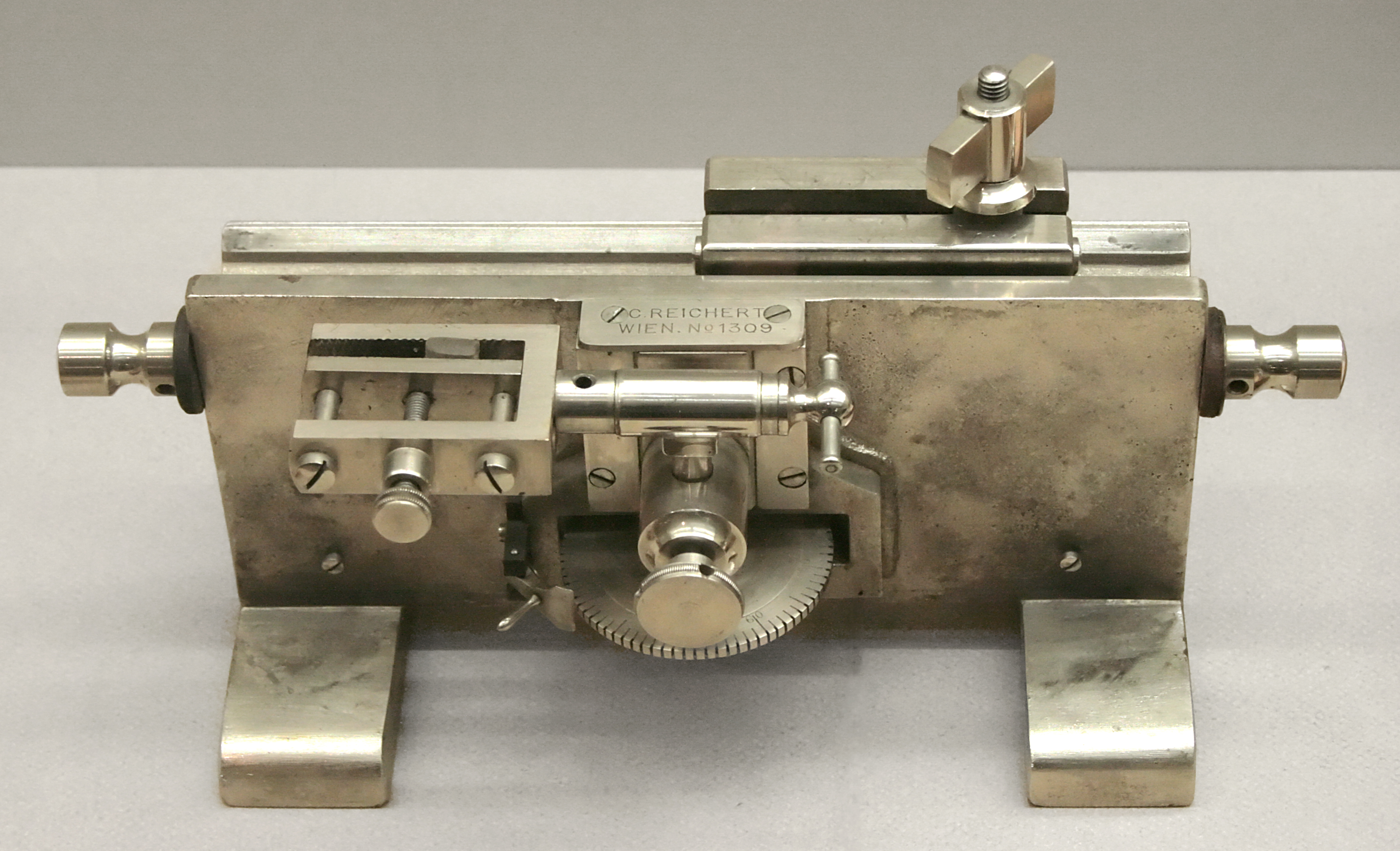
Mikrotom made by von C. Reichert, Wien

=== The aquarium ===
The aquarium was constructed by William Alford Lloyd . Dohrn had met Lloyd in 1866 in Hamburg.

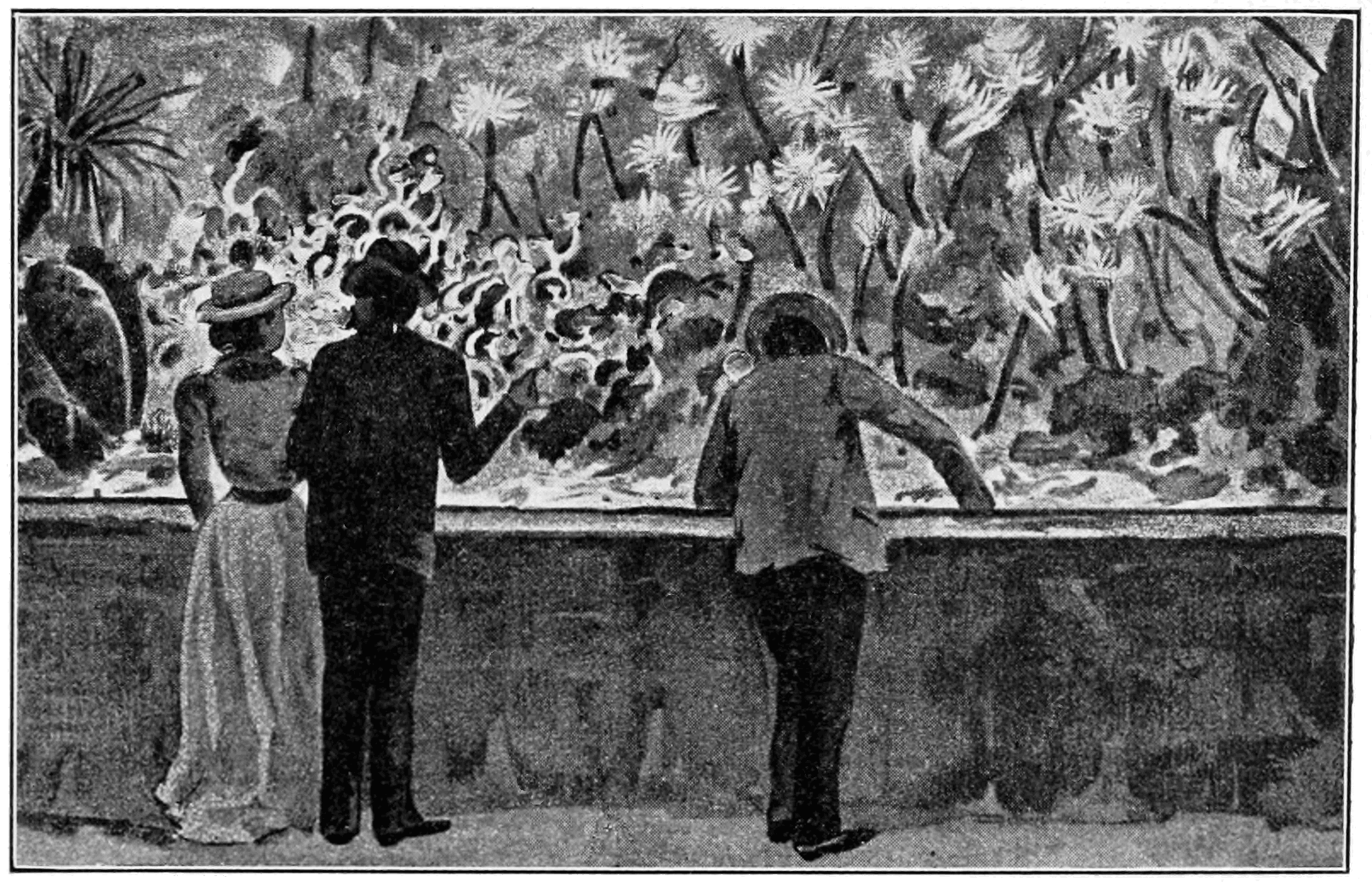
1910

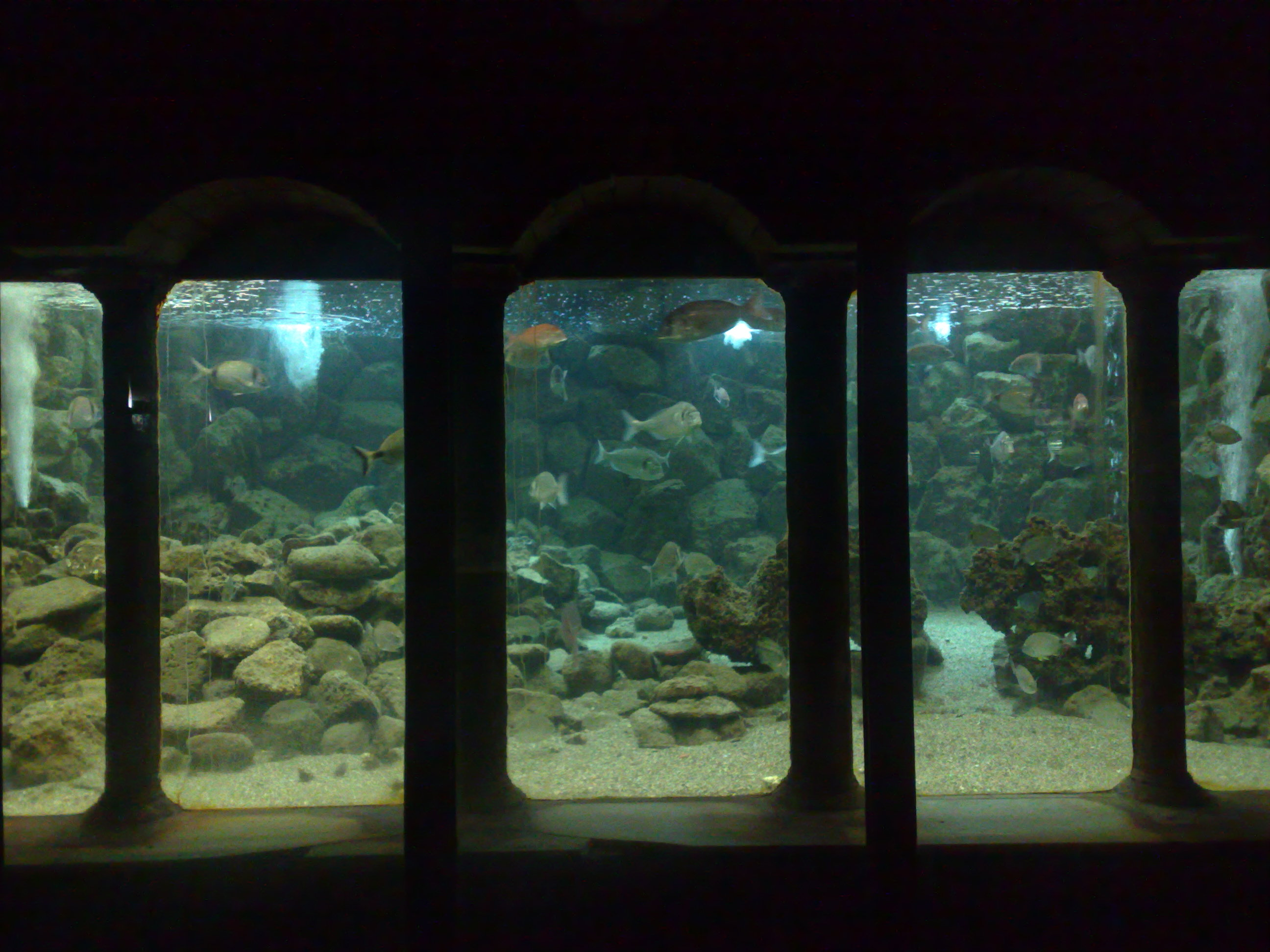
Today

=== Culture ===
Dohrn followed Goethe in considering arts and science inseparable. He was devoted to music and in 1873 employed Hans von Marées (1837–1887) and Adolf von Hildebrand to enhance Stazione Zoologica with art works.

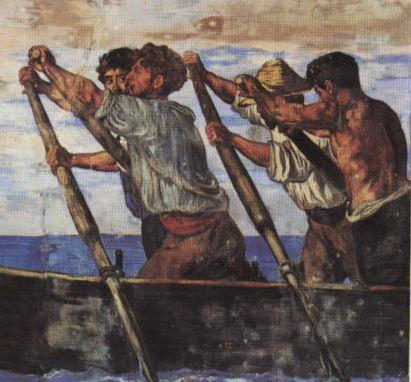
Pescatori che remano (particolare)

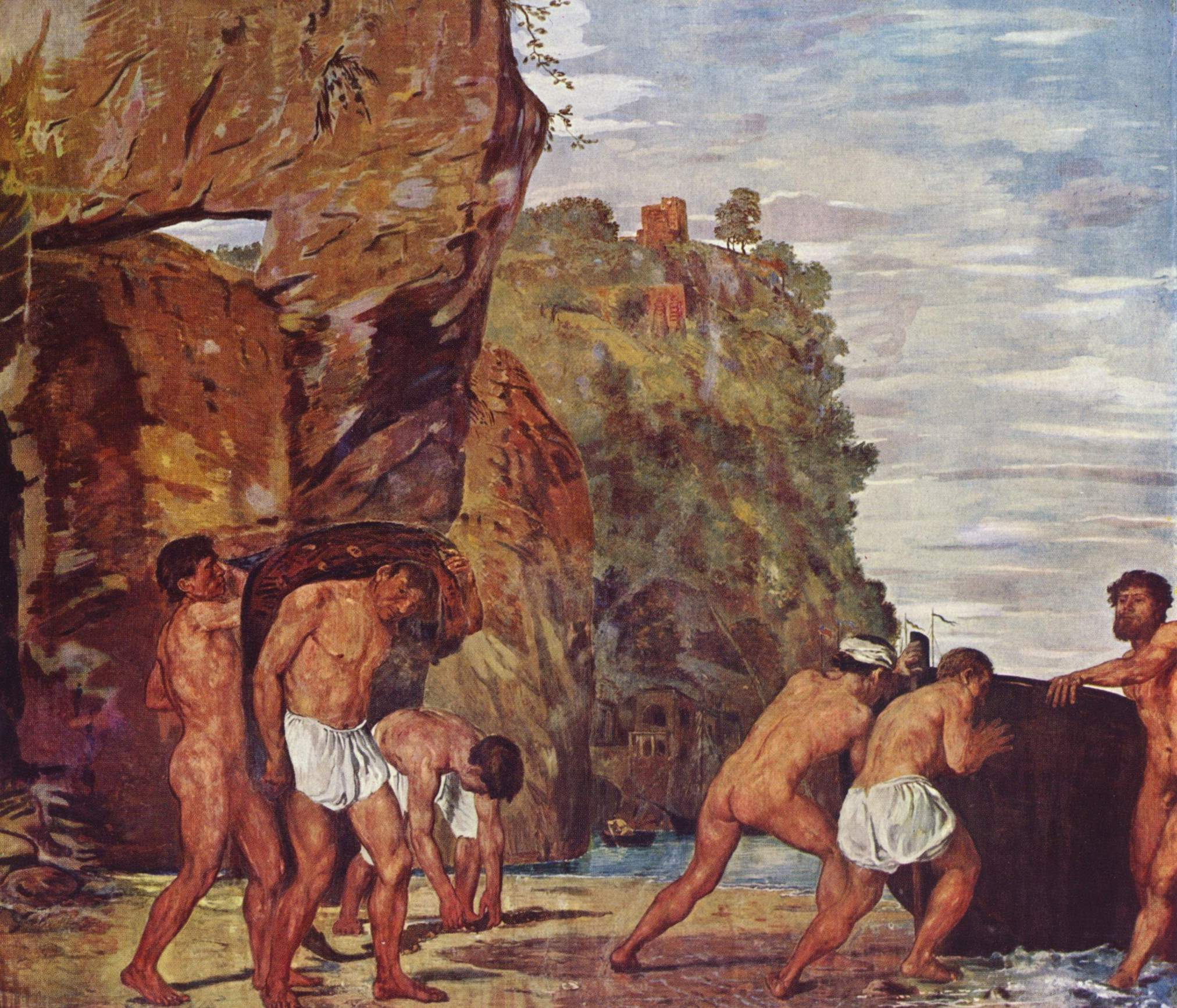
Pescatori

== Later history ==
Anton Dohrn's son Reinhard Dohrn (1880–1962) continued his father's work from 1909. Peter Dohrn (1917–2007) acted as director between 1954 and 1967. From 1967 to 1976 SZN was led by a Commissario Straordinario. In 1976 following the appointment of Alberto Monroy, an embryologist, as Director a radical reorganisation began. SZN was divided into five parts: Biological Oceanography, Benthic Ecology (at the Villa Dohrn in Ischia), Biochemistry, Cell and Developmental Biology and Neurobiology and. In 1982 SZN became an "Ente pubblico di ricerca (National Research Institute) under the directorship of Antonio Miralto. In 1987 Gaetano Salvatore, dean of the Medical School of Università Federico II in Napoli, was appointed president of the Stazione Zoologica. After his death in 1997, Professor Giorgio Bernardi was appointed as president. He launched the study of molecular evolution "at the institutional level" completing Dohrn's vision.

== People associated with SZN ==
- Wilhelm Giesbrecht
- René-Édouard Claparède
- Heinrich Otto Wilhelm Bürger
- George Stuart Carter FRSE
- Francis Gerald William Knowles FRS 1937-38 and intermittently thereafter to 1974
- Richard Parkinson
- Hans Adolf Eduard Driesch
- Arthur Henry Reginald Buller Researcher, 1900-1901 on the fertilization of sea urchin eggs
- Carl Vogt (1879 and 1884)
- Emil du Bois-Reymond (1878)
- Gaetano Chierchia Naturalist on the Italian research ship Vettor Pisani.
- James Dewey Watson
- Angelo Andres
- Ernst Ehlers
- Charles Otis Whitman Mid-1870s early 1880s with Emily Nunn
- Carl Chun
- William Morton Wheeler Research in Münich, Naples, Liège, 1893-1894
- Hermon Carey Bumpus Research, Münich, Naples 1893
- Friedrich Alfred Krupp
- Vladimir Timofeyevich Szewiakow
- Jakob von Uexküll
- Albrecht Bethe de:Albrecht Bethe
- August Weismann
- Adolf Naef
- Ernest Everett Just
- Otto Heinrich Warburg
- Fridtjof Nansen
- Robert Francis Scharff
- Gottlieb von Koch (1849–1914) Professor of Zoology at the Technical School, Darmstadt. He wrote "Die Gorgoniden des Golfes von Neapel und der angrenzenden Meeresabschnitte..." published in Berlin in 1887 and published on octocorals between 1874 and 1891.
- Theodor Boveri and Marcella Boveri
- Raphael Weldon, who visited in summer 1882, working on Lacerta muralis, the common wall lizard, and then later (on his honeymoon) in spring 1883. Pearson's obituary of Weldon (p. 10) reports that "At Easter (1884) Banyuls was visited, and the summer vacation found Weldon in Naples again for the three months preparing his fellowship dissertation (for Cambridge). In Naples the cholera had broken out, and the Weldons experienced not only difficulty in getting the precious dissertation back to England, but in returning themselves."
- Francis Maitland Balfour (See Letter 9289– Charles Darwin to F.A. Dohrn 13 February 1874: "F. M. Balfour to visit Naples").
- Jerome Y. Lettvin. Researched octopus visual neurophysiology in the summers of 1959, 1961, and 1963.
- John Zachary Young. Neurophysiologist, honored with Stazione Zoologica gold medal.
- Ida Henrietta Hyde
- George Wilton Field (1892–1893)
- Thomas Hunt Morgan (1894)
- David Fairchild (1894)
- Raffaello Bellini
- Grigore Antipa
- Nino Salvatore
- Rachel Leech (1959–60) studying chloroplast cytochromes

== See also ==
- Observatoire Oceanologique de Villefranche
- Oceanographic Museum Monaco (Musée Océanographique)
- List of oceanographic institutions and programs
- Biogem Institute
