= Heinrich Otto Wilhelm Bürger =

German zoologist

Heinrich Otto Wilhelm Bürger (4 May 1865 Hannover – 18 January 1945, Törwang) was a German zoologist who specialised in Nemertea. He studied at several universities and at Stazione Zoologica in Naples. He gained his doctorate at the University of Göttingen under Ernst Ehlers. Between 1900 and 1908, he was Professor and Director of theZoology museum in Santiago de Chile. He later, still in South America, lived as a gentleman scientist, travel writer and economic geographer.

== Works ==
partial list

- Bürger, 1895. Die Nemertinen des Golfes von Neapel und der angrenzenden Meeres-Abschnitte. Fauna Flora Golf. Neapel, 22: 1–743. Also in: Fauna und Flora des Golfes von Neapel. Zoologischen station zu Neapel (Ed.). Verlag von R. Friedländer & Sohn, Berlin. 568 pp
- Otto Bürger Die Robinson -Insel.Leipzig, Th. Welcher 1909, Umfang 123 S., 12 SW-Fotos, Karte der Issel Jusn Fernandez.
