= Caspar René Gregory =

American-born German theologian

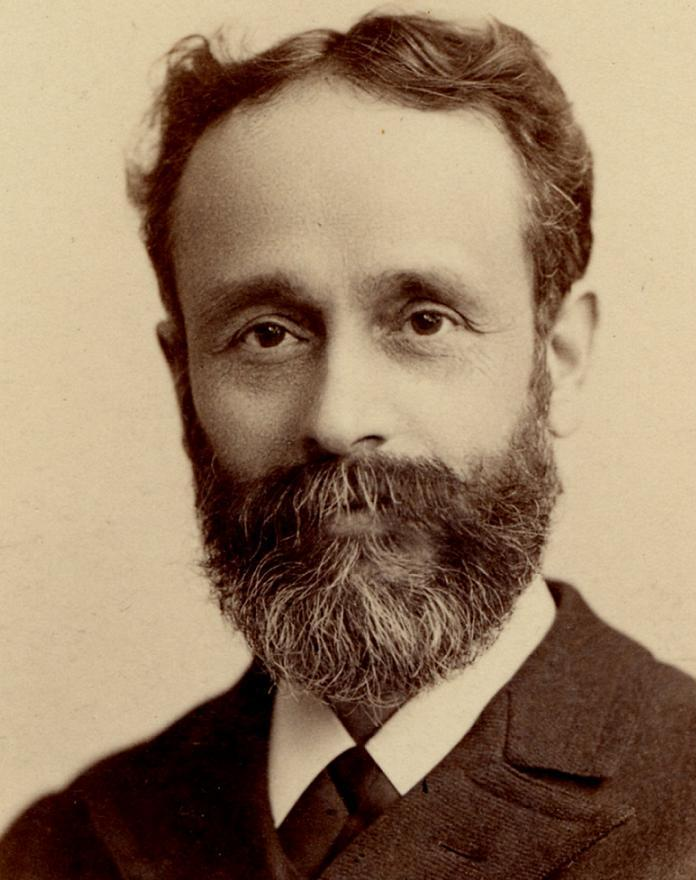
- Gregory in 1894
- Born: November 6, 1846; Philadelphia, Pennsylvania
- Died: April 9, 1917 (aged 70) near Neufchâtel-sur-Aisne, France

Academic background
- Education: University of Pennsylvania; Reformed Presbyterian Theological Seminary; Princeton Theological Seminary; Leipzig University
- Thesis: Grégoire the priest and the revolutionist (1876)

Academic work
- Discipline: Theology
- Institutions: Leipzig University; Ludwig-Maximilians-Universität München
- Notable students: Edward Rand
- Notable works: Textkritik des neuen Testamentes

Caspar René Gregory (November 6, 1846 – April 9, 1917) was an American-German theologian.

== Life ==
Gregory was born to Mary Jones and Henry Duval Gregory in Philadelphia. He was the brother of the American zoologist Emily Ray Gregory. After completing his bachelor's degree at the University of Pennsylvania in 1864, he studied theology at two Presbyterian seminaries: in 1865–1867 at the Reformed Presbyterian Theological Seminary, Philadelphia, and in 1867–1873 at the Princeton Theological Seminary. In 1873, he decided to continue his studies at Leipzig University under Constantin von Tischendorf, to whose work on textual criticism of the New Testament he had been referred by his teacher Ezra Abbot. He administered the scientific legacy of Tischendorf, who died in 1874, and continued his work.

In 1876, he obtained his PhD with a dissertation titled Grégoire the priest and the revolutionist. The first examiner for it was the historian Georg Voigt.

He completed his post-doctoral work in Leipzig in 1884, and became an associate professor in 1889 and a full honorary professor in 1891. That same year, he was elected an International Member of the American Philosophical Society. He apparently had several doctorates: Karl Josef Friedrich (p. 130) even mentions five doctorates in his biography of Gregory. At least one doctorate in theology obtained in Leipzig in 1889 is attested. In June 1901, he received an honorary doctorate of Divinity from the University of Glasgow.

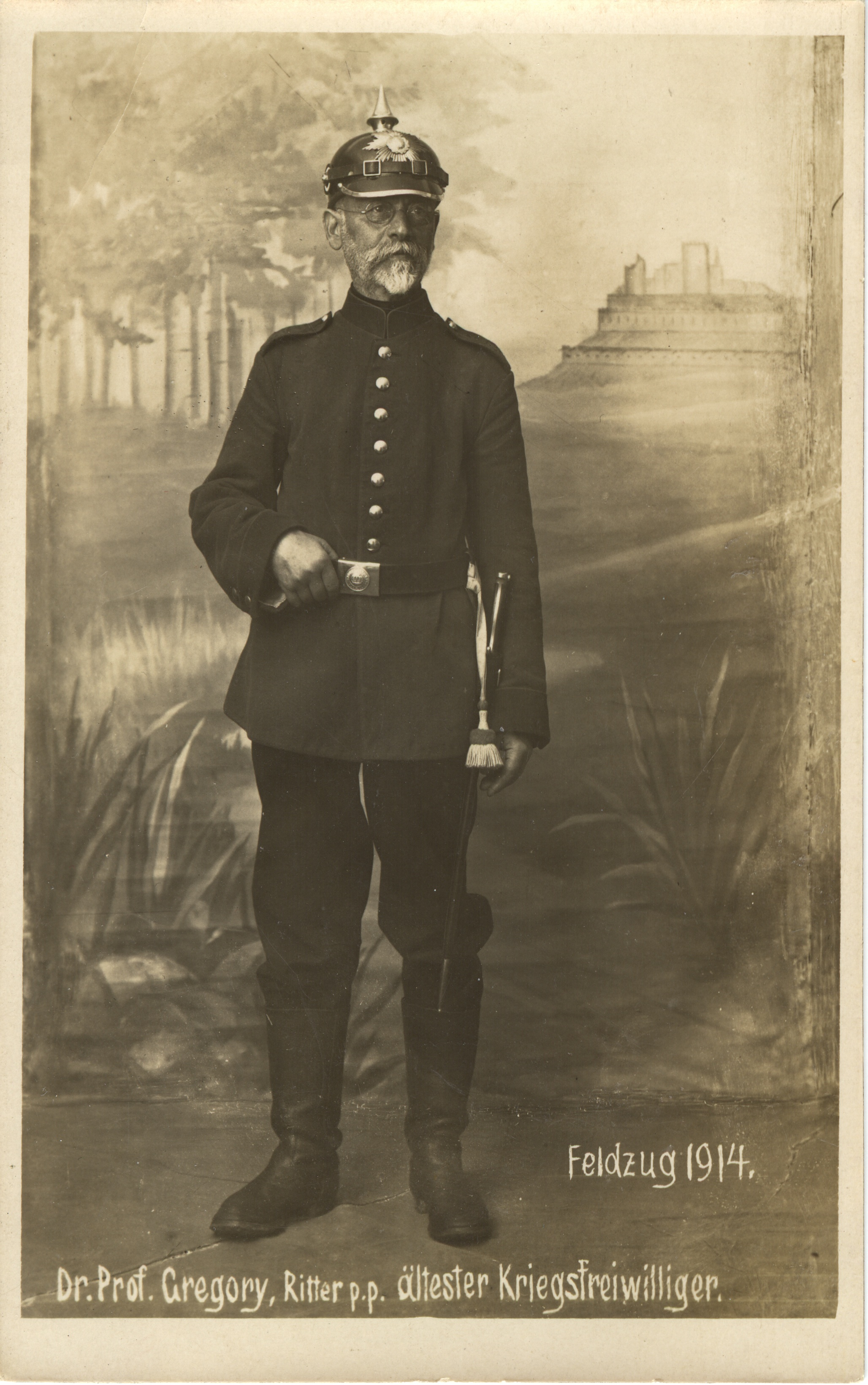
Caspar René Gregory in 1914

On August 11, 1914, Gregory, who had been a citizen of Saxony since 1881, enlisted in the German Army as its oldest wartime volunteer. He became a second lieutenant in November 1916 and died on April 9, 1917, in a field hospital in Neufchâtel-sur-Aisne, France.

Gregory specialized in New Testament textual criticism. He organized biblical manuscripts into a classification system (Die griechischen Handschriften des Neuen Testaments, 1908) which continues to be in use throughout the scholarly world today. He is also credited with being the first to notice the consistent medieval practice (called Gregory's Law or Gregory's Rule) of collating parchment leaves so that grain side faced grain side and flesh side flesh side. He was also interested in biblical canon.

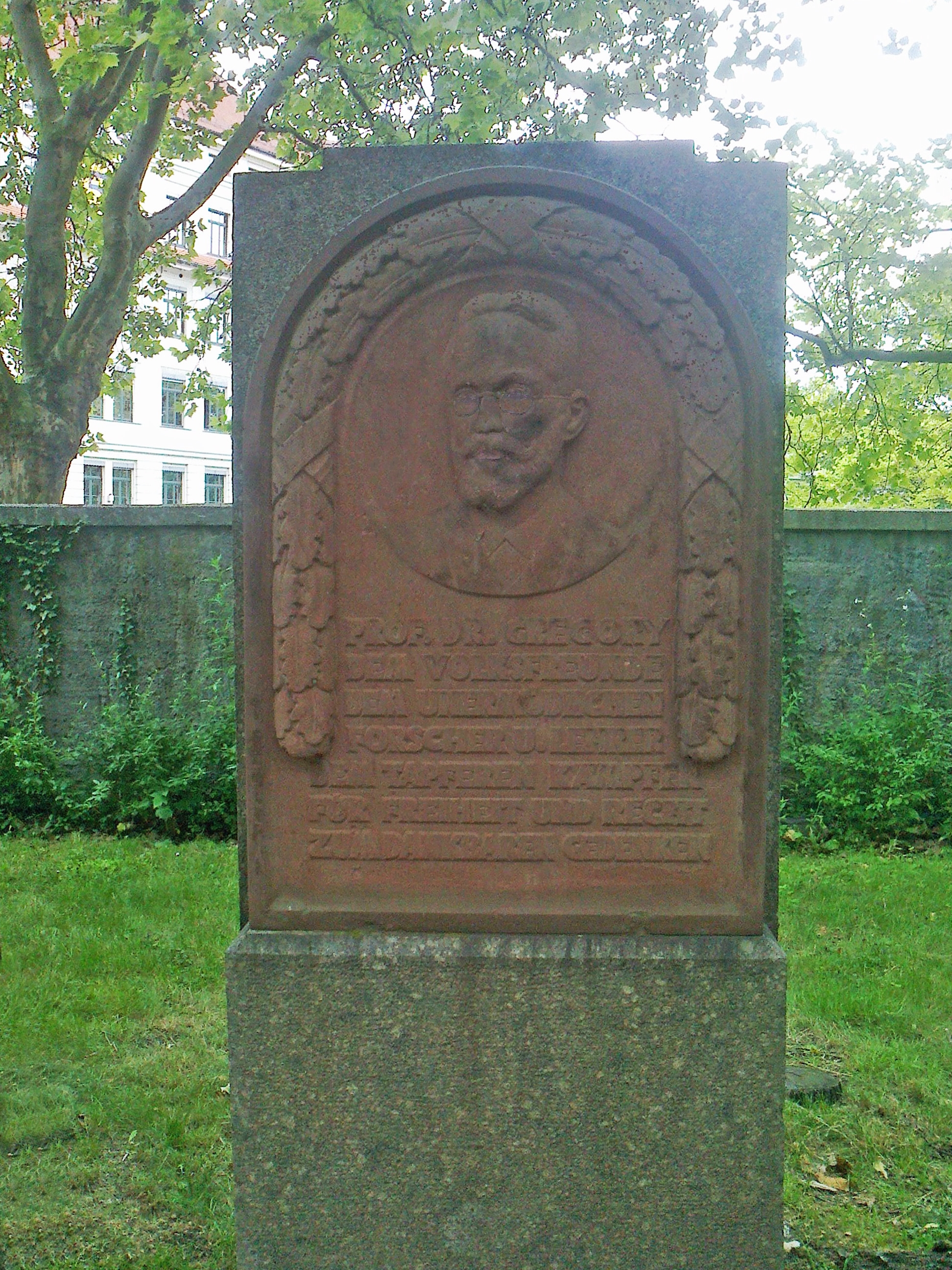
Relief of Caspar René Gregory in Leipzig on Naunhofer Straße

== Works ==
=== Books ===
- Gregory, Caspar René (1884–1894). Prolegomena zu Tischendorfs Novum Testamentum Graece (editio VIII. critica major), 2 Vols..
- ——— (1900). Textkritik des Neuen Testaments (in German). Vol. 1. Leipzig: J.C. Hinrichs'sche Buchhandlung.
- ——— (1907). Canon and Text of the New Testament. New York: Charles Scribner's Sons.
- ——— (1908). Das Freer-Logion. Leipzig: Hinrichs.
- ——— (1908). Die griechischen Handschriften des Neuen Testaments. Leipzig: J.C. Hinrichs'sche Buchhandlung.
- ——— (1909). Einleitung in das Neue Testament.
- ——— (1911). Vorschläge für eine kritische Ausgabe des griechischen Neuen Testaments.
- ——— (1913). Die Koridethi-Evangelien.
- ——— (1919). Zu Fuß in Bibellanden. Hermann Guthe.

=== Journal articles ===
- ——— (1899). "The Essay 'Contra Novatianum'". The American Journal of Theology. 3 (3): 566–570. doi:10.1086/477154.

== Literature ==
- Ernst Barnikol (1966). "Gregory, Caspar René". Neue Deutsche Biographie (in German). Vol. 7. Berlin: Duncker & Humblot. pp. 27–29. (full text online)..
- Friedrich Wilhelm Bautz (1990). "Caspar René Gregory". In Bautz, Friedrich Wilhelm (ed.). Biographisch-Bibliographisches Kirchenlexikon (BBKL) (in German). Vol. 2. Hamm: Bautz. col. 344. ISBN 3-88309-032-8.
- Karl Josef Friedrich, Caspar Rene Gregory, in: Sächsische Lebensbilder, Vol. I, Dresden 1930, p. 125-131. (in German)
- Ernst Jünger, ed. (1928), "Caspar René Gregory", in: Die Unvergessenen. Berlin: Andermann. p. 111 ff. (in German)
- Bruno Hartung (1929), "Caspar René Gregory", in: Das Jahr des Herrn: Kalender für die evangelischen Gemeinden Leipzigs. 5. Jg., p. 36-38. (in German)
