= Nicolaus Kleinenberg =

German zoologist (1842–1897)

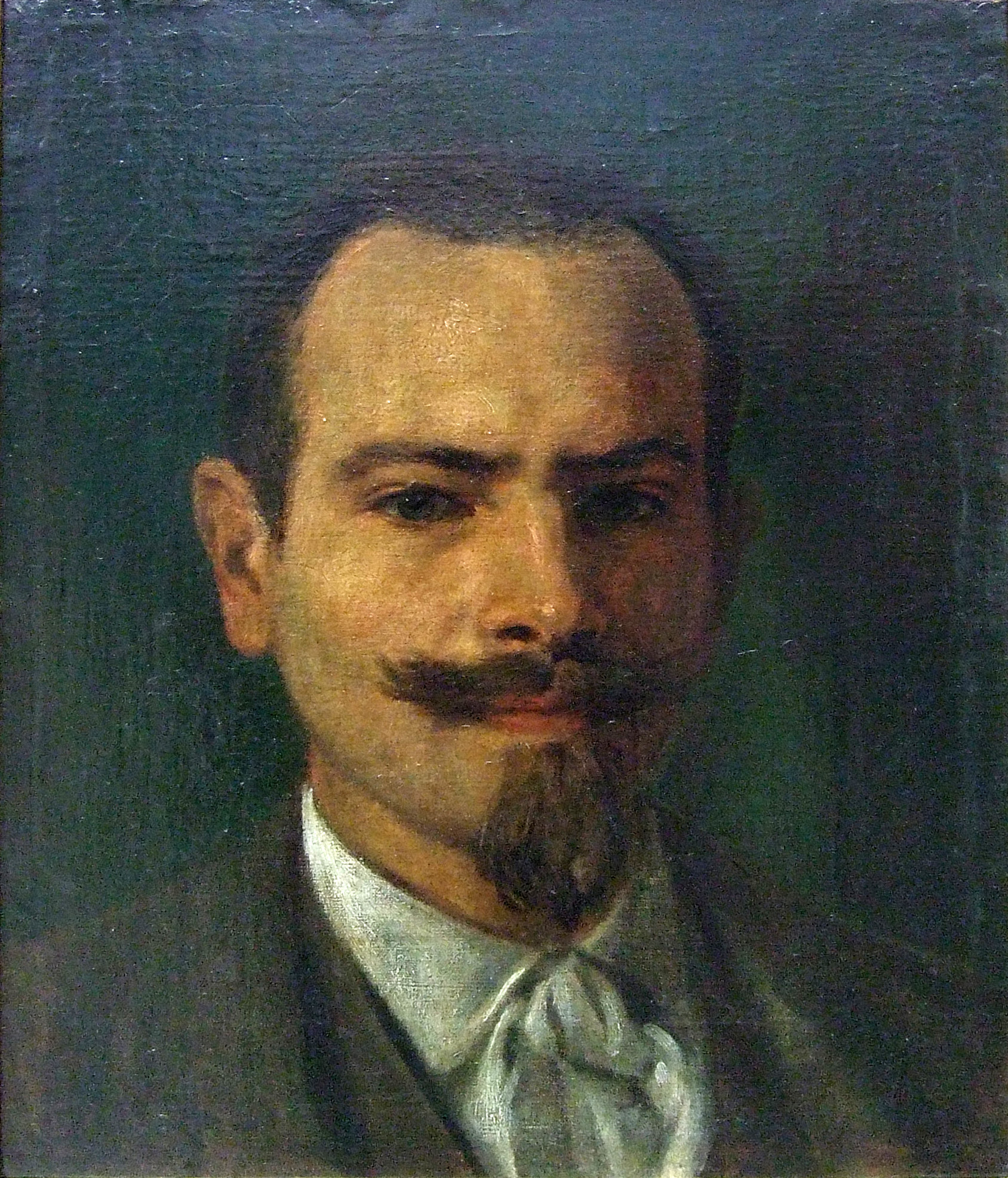
Nicolaus Kleinenberg.

Nicolaus Kleinenberg (11 March 1842, in Libau – 5 November 1897, in Naples) was a Baltic German zoologist and evolutionary morphologist.

He studied at the University of Jena under Ernst Haeckel, obtaining his doctorate for studies of embryo cleavage in Hydra. His later work Hydra - Eine anatomisch-entwicklungsgeschichtliche untersuchung, in English "An anatomical-evolutionary investigation of Hydra" (Leipzig, Wilhelm Engelmann, 1872) is a classic, still quoted monograph which has implications for evolution theory.

He obtained an appointment at the University of Messina in 1882, from which he was transferred to Palermo. In 1888 he was appointed a member of the "Commissione consultiva per la pesca," to which, in addition to his scientific knowledge, he brought a large amount of practical information acquired by continual intercourse with fishermen.

Kleinenberg was a close friend of Anton Dohrn, helping him to found the marine station at Messina, where he was professor. He worked with Ilya Ilyich Mechnikov and Rudolf Ludwig Karl Virchow on their visits to Messina. Kleinenberg and Hugo Eisig were the first assistants at Stazione Zoologica in Naples.

== Selected writings ==
- Hydra : eine Anatomisch-entwicklungsgeschichtliche Untersuchung, 1872 - Hydra, an anatomical-evolutionary investigation.
- Una Stazione e Scuola Zoologica in Messina, 1880 - The zoological station and school in Messina.
- Sull'origine del sistema nervoso central degli Anellidi, 1881 - On the central nervous system of annelids.
- Die Entstehung des Annelids aus der Larve von Lopadorhynchus. Nebst bemerkungen über die Entwicklung anderer Polychaeten, 1886 - On the formation of annelids from the larvae of Lopadorhynchus.

== Sources ==
- "Клейненберг, Николаус" . Brockhaus and Efron Encyclopedic Dictionary (in Russian). 1906.
