= Spio aequalis =

Conservation status
- Nationally Endangered (NZ TCS)

Scientific classification
- Kingdom: Animalia
- Phylum: Annelida
- Clade: Pleistoannelida
- Clade: Sedentaria
- Order: Spionida
- Family: Spionidae
- Genus: Spio
- Species: S. aequalis

Binomial name
- Spio aequalis Ehlers, 1904

Species of annelid worm

Spio aequalis is a species of polychaete worm from New Zealand.

Little is known about the species, which is classified as nationally endangered.

== History ==
Spio aequalis was first collected by Hugo Schauinsland in 1897 and named by Ernst Ehlers in 1904. It is not known exactly where the original specimen was collected but it was thought to be from near Waitangi on the Chatham Islands.

Two years later, in November 1899, William Benham collected at least one specimen at Moeraki in North Otago. He later recognised it as the same species described by Ehlers.

In 1949, several large specimens were collected by George Knox at Squally Bay on Bank Peninsula. However, this record was unpublished.

Nearly 60 years later, Geoff Read found a living specimen on Banks Peninsula in 2008. This was followed by a further observation in December 2016 in the Wellington region and in June/July 2016 at Henderson Bay on the Aupouri Peninsula.

== Habitat ==
The species is thought to live on exposed coasts, perhaps under stones for protection.

== Description ==
S. aequalis is one of the largest known species of spionid. Specimens measure between 5.5–15 centimetres (2.2–5.9 in) in length and 5–7 millimetres (0.20–0.28 in) wide.

== Behaviour & diet ==
Spio aequalis is likely to be a surface deposit-feeder and may burrow in sediment.
