= Brian Dale =

British reproductive scientist

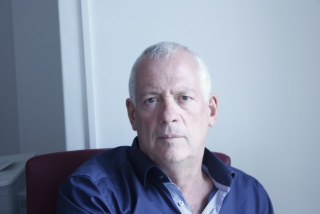
Brian Dale

Brian Dale (31 August 1951) is a British reproductive scientist living in Sorrento, Italy. He is currently owner and Director of the Centre for Assisted Fertilization, which has offices in Naples and Rome and Director of London Fertility Associates Ltd in London. He is also a founder and partner in the Swiss-based company, International Fertility Associates.

While working for the Stazione Zoologica, Naples, and on leave at the National Institutes of Health in Bethesda in 1983, he was attributed with the discovery of a soluble sperm factor in spermatozoa that is responsible for the activation of oocytes. His studies span animals and humans, from the identification of novel ion channels specific to fertilization, the fertilization channels, to processes leading to blastocyst formation in the human embryo Dr Dale has developed and patented with Jacques Cohen equipment that filters and regulates air quality in IVF laboratories( CODA) used worldwide today to improve the success rates in human in vitro reproductive technologies.

He is founder and Editor in Chief of the International peer review journal of embryology, Zygote, published by Cambridge University Press and was visiting professor and visiting scientist at the University of Western Australia and NIH respectively.

== Early career and education ==
Dale was born in Stockport UK, where he attended Burnage Grammar School. He received a B.Sc. from the University of Manchester in zoology in 1972 with a First Class Honours. An M.Sc. in 1973 and then finally a Ph.D. in cell biology from the same university. For his contribution to the understanding of basic processes in the mechanism of fertilization he was awarded the D.Sc. in 1990(Manchester University).

== Reproductive science ==
In 1977, Dale joined the Stazione Zoologica in Naples as a post-doctoral fellow of the Royal Society of Pathology, London where he joined the team of Alberto Monroy to study mechanisms of fertilization. One of his first discoveries, with Louis J De Felice from the US, was a novel non specific ion channel, the fertilization channel, that was gated by the spermatozoon, and later led to the hypothesis of a soluble sperm borne activating factor, that is now known to be ubiquitous. Using invertebrate and vertebrate gametes, the next two decades led to unifying concepts in the mechanism and kinetics of fertilization across the animal kingdom(8). In the early 1990s, thanks to the availability of human gametes and embryos for basic research, Dale launched research projects that led to the identification of the first activation event in the human oocyte(9) and the role of cell-cell interactions in the human embryo(6). His latest research is dedicated to the study of mitochondrial activity in human oocytes and DNA damage in human embryos.

Dale has published over 130 peer review papers and 7 books on fertilization and embryology. His first book Fertilization in Animals published in 1983 in the Studies in Biology Series is still considered a standard for scholars, while his latest In Vitro Fertilization translated also into Russian and Turkish, with co-author Kay Elder is used for University courses and by ESHRE for their embryology accreditation course.

== Honours and awards ==
- Italian Advisory Committee for European Society for Human Reproduction and Embryology (ESHRE) 1996 -1998.
- Fellow of the Society of Biology, London, 1998.
- Fellow of the Royal College of Pathology, London, 2010.

== Notes ==
Links

- http://www.ivfpodcasts.com/IVF_Podcasts/Podcasts.php?Fertilization-and-Early-Embryos-23
- http://www.ivfpodcasts.com/IVF_Podcasts/Podcasts.php?Oocyte-Activation-24
