= Nino Salvatore =

Italian biomedical researcher (1932–1997)

Gaetano "Nino" Salvatore (28 July 1932 – 25 June 1997) was an Italian endocrinologist known for his extensive research on the thyroid gland. He spent the majority of his career in Naples' Stazione Zoologica and the University of Naples Federico II, while also spending periods at the American National Institutes of Health and in France.

== Life and career ==
Salvatore studied medicine at the University of Naples Federico II and, after graduating, travelled to Paris to work at the Collège de France with the endocrinologist Jean Roche. During his time in Paris from 1956 to 1958, he developed an interest in endocrinology and particularly the thyroid gland. He returned to Naples in 1959 and continued to collaborate with Roche on research into thyroid diseases at the Stazione Zoologica. In 1961, he moved to Marseille before relocating again in 1962 to the United States, where he worked in Jacob Robbins and Joseph Edward Rall's laboratory at the National Institutes of Health (NIH) in Bethesda, Maryland, until 1964.

Salvatore returned to Naples in 1964, where he hosted many foreign investigators, and continued to visit laboratories across Europe and the United States. He intermittently spent time at the NIH in Bethesda, where he was a professor of general pathology between 1972 and 1974, and received a NIH Fogarty Scholarship in 1977. He headed the Centre of Experimental Endocrinology and Oncology of the Italian National Research Council (CNR) from 1972 to 1997 and served as dean of the University of Naples Federico II medical school from 1981 to 1997. He was also president of Stazione Zoologica from 1987 and chair of the CNR Committee for Biotechnology from 1994, both until his death in 1997. He successfully advocated for the introduction of iodised salt to prevent endemic goitre and universal newborn screening for congenital hypothyroidism in Italy.

== Research ==
Salvatore's early research at the NIH focused on the synthesis and structure of thyroglobulin. He discovered in the 1960s that thyroid hormones can be found in the lowest classes of vertebrates and invertebrates. At the NIH, he and his collaborators developed a method for purifying and isolating thyroid iodoproteins (proteins containing iodine) and subsequently discovered a new iodoprotein named 27S thyroglobulin. In the 1980s, he developed the FRTL-5 cell line of rat thyroid cells that was adopted worldwide for performing various functions of the thyroid gland in in vitro experiments. He also contributed to the discovery of the RET proto-oncogene's role in thyroid cancer and the role of various other genes in thyroid development. His last research paper, published posthumously, covered the synthesis of thyroid hormones within the thyroglobulin molecule.
