= Antonio della Valle =

Italian zoologist

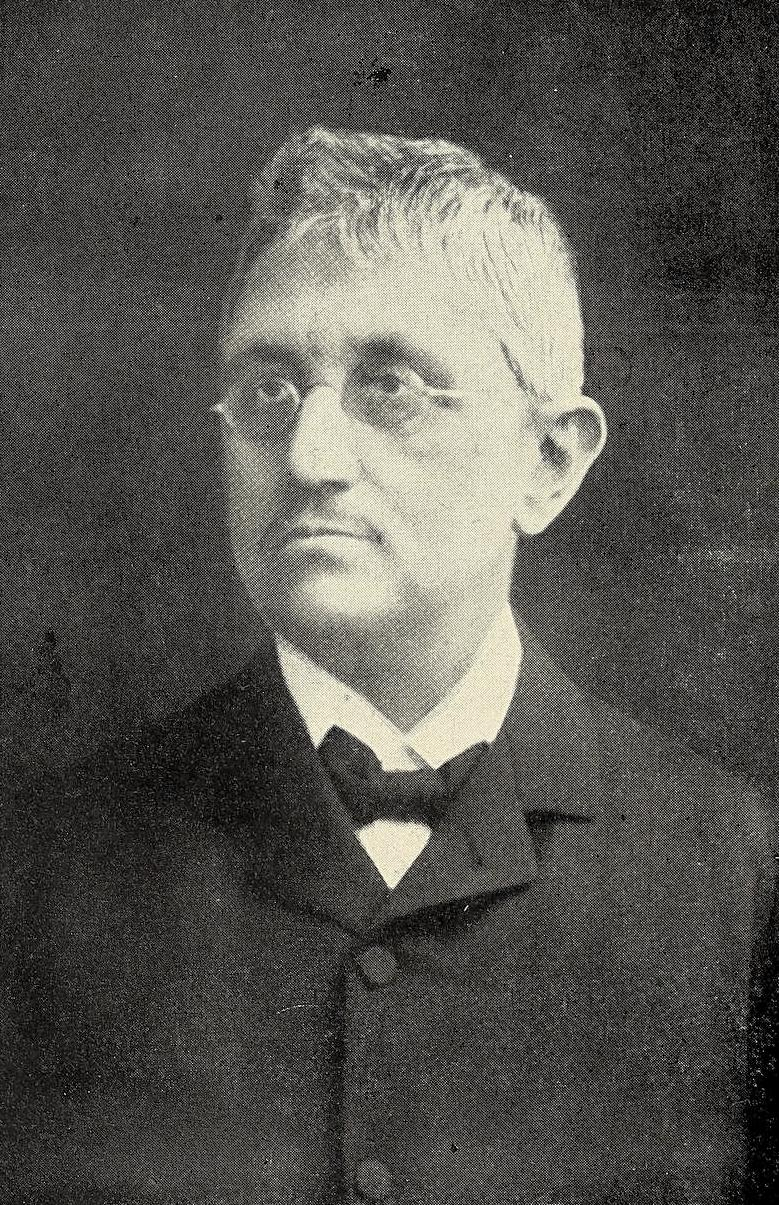
Image of Antonio Della Valle

Antonio della Valle (1850, Naples, Kingdom of the Two Sicilies - 1935) was an Italian zoologist who specialised in Amphipoda and Ascidiacea.

He held positions in the University of Modena and was later professor of Comparative Anatomy at the University of Naples and was a member of the research team at Stazione Zoologica in Naples.

== Works ==
Partial list

- 1877 Contribuzioni alla storia naturale delle ascidie composte del Golfo di Napoli con la descrizione di alcune specie e varietà nuove di altre poco note. Napoli :Tip. Communi
- 1881 Nuove contribuzioni alla storia naturale delle ascidie composte del Golfo di Napoli. Atti Accad. nag. Lincei Series 3, Memoir 10: 431–498
- 1893 Gammarini del golfo di Napoli : Monografia / di Antonio della Valle. Con un atlante di 61 tavole in litografia. Hrsg. von der Zoologischen station zu Neapel.Series: Fauna und Flora des Golfes von Neapel 20 Berlin :R. Friedländer & Sohn
