= George Wilton Field =

American biologist

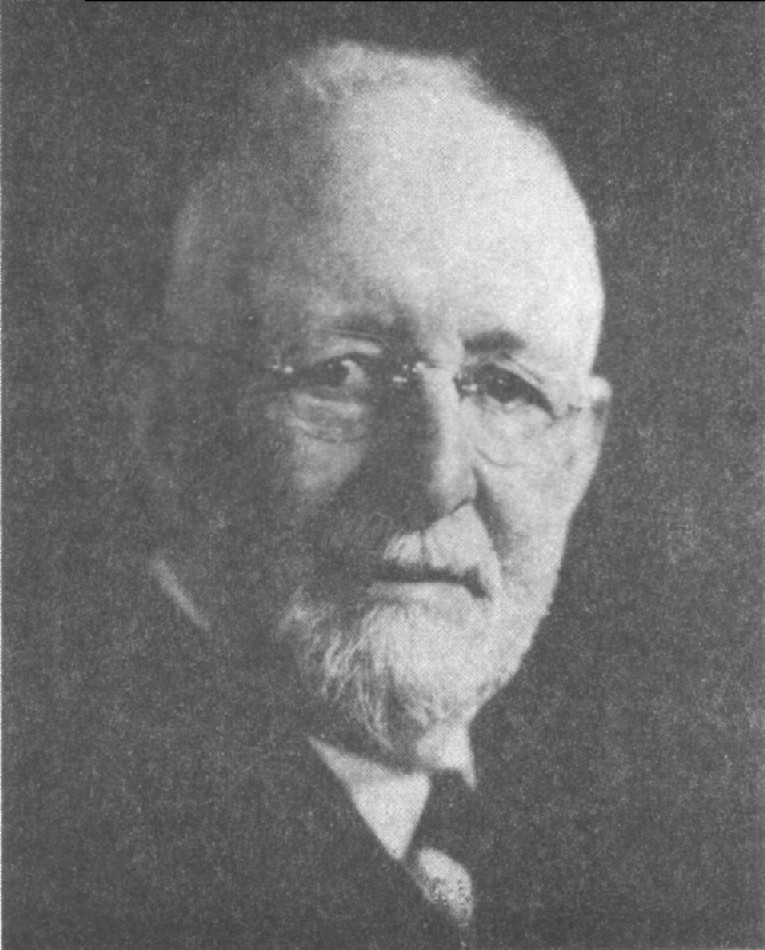
- George Wilton Field in 1918 with the United States Bureau of Biological Survey, U.S. Department of Agriculture, Washington, D.C.
- Born: September 29, 1863; North Bridgewater, Massachusetts, US
- Died: January 19, 1938 (aged 74); Washington, DC, US
- Education: Brown University, Johns Hopkins University, Ludwig-Maximilians-Universität München (LMU)
- Known for: Establishment of the marine laboratory of Rhode Island College of Agriculture and Mechanic Arts
- Scientific career
- Fields: Biology
- Workplaces: Brown University; Rhode Island Agricultural Experiment Station; MIT; Massachusetts Commissioners of Fisheries and Game; Massachusetts Audubon Society, U.S. Department of Agriculture
- Thesis: The larva of Asterias vulgaris
- Doctoral advisor: William Keith Brooks

George Wilton Field, Ph.D. (1863–1938) was an American biologist, born at North Bridgewater, Massachusetts. Working primarily in Rhode Island and Massachusetts, Field was a pioneer in the field of shellfish aquaculture and water pollution, and took an interest in conservation issues. Beginning in 1916, Field was in the employ of the U.S. Bureau of the Biological survey, and later in his career was the United States representative to the League of Nations International Commission on Water Pollution Control.

== Biography ==
George Wilton Field was born 29 September 1863 in North Bridgewater, Massachusetts to Charles C. Field and Lucy (Cross) Field. He attended local public schools in North Bridgewater, graduating from high school in 1882. He undertook field studies in marine biology in the Bay of Fundy region of Nova Scotia in 1883, and in the Gulf of St. Lawrence in 1885, and he graduated from Brown University (A.B., 1887; A.M., 1890) and from Johns Hopkins University (Ph.D., 1892). He did postdoctoral studies in Naples, Italy at the Stazione Zoologica, and at the Ludwig-Maximilians-Universität München (LMU). From his work in Germany, Field was fluent in German, and as a result was a translator of several German scientific works into English including those of biologists Richard Hertwig and Ernst Haeckel. He married Mary Bell Bacon (1863-1951) on 29 June 1892 in Natick, Massachusetts, and they had four children.

The Marine Laboratory of the Rhode Island Agricultural Experiment Station established in 1896 by George W. Field after his studies at the Stazione Zoologica in Naples.

Field worked in Rhode Island, the Massachusetts and the U.S. federal government in his occupations. He became associate professor of cellular biology at Brown University from 1893-96. He was hired by Josiah H. Washburn as a zoology professor and marine biologist at the Rhode Island Agricultural Experiment Station from 1896 to 1900, where he established Rhode Island's first marine laboratory on Point Judith Pond in the municipality of South Kingstown. Field's research was primarily concerned with the aquaculture of oysters and other marine organisms in Point Judith Pond and the effects of planktonic food availability and oxygen availability on their growth and survival. He had additional studies on starfish as predators of oysters. He was an instructor in economic biology at MIT in 1902; and in 1903 worked as a biologist at the Massachusetts Commission on Fisheries and Game, becoming chairman of the commission in 1904. He served as a Massachusetts Fishery and Game Commissioner until 18 Feb 1916.

Field was an expert on water pollution and the effects of industrial pollutants on the growth and survival of oysters and other marine organisms. In 1905, conducted a study on the effects of coal tar on oyster beds, and he served as a scientific consultant to the Rhode Island Commissioners of Shellfisheries in a pioneering 1910 water pollution case brought by Rhode Island oyster farmers against the Providence Gas Company.

Prof. Field became a director of the Massachusetts Audubon Society, and in 1911, he was elected president of the National Association of Shellfisheries Commissioners.

Following his work in Massachusetts in 1916, Field joined the Bureau of Biological Survey of the U.S. Department of Agriculture in the capacity of supervisor of the 74 national bird and mammal reservations in the United States. He served in that capacity until 6 December 1919 when he became a consultant to the Government of Brazil in the early 1920s on matters of environmental conservation. And in the early 1930s, he was a consulting biologist with the United States Department of Agriculture serving as the United States representative on international cooperation on water pollution control.

As a result of complications due to an automobile accident in Paris during one of his trips to Europe as the U.S. Soil and Water representative to the League of Nations, Field died on 19 January 1938 in Washington, DC.

== Selected publications ==
- Field, G.W. (1895). On the morphology and physiology of the echinoderm spermatozoon. Journal of Morphology 11(2):235-270.
- Field, G.W. (1898). Methods in planktology. The American Naturalist 32(382): 735-745.
- Field, G.W. (1898). The utilization of waste products and waste places. Part 2. The clam: cultivation of tidal mud flats. Research Bulletin 51. Rhode Island Agricultural Experiment Station, Kingston. 15pp.
- Field, G.W. (1910). Lobsters and the lobster problem in Massachusetts. Bulletin of the U.S. Bureau of Fisheries. 28:209-217.
- Field, G.W. and F.H. Herrick. (1911). The Lobster Fishery: a Special Report Including Suggestions for Uniform Laws Made to the Legislature of Massachusetts. Commissioners of Fisheries and Game, Commonwealth of Massachusetts. Boston: Wright and Potter. 101pp.
- Field, G.W. (1916). The necessity for biological bases for legislation and practise in the fisheries industries. Science 44(1129):224-229.
- Field, G.W. (1926). Existing practices of polluting public water courses. Science 63(1635): 443-446.
