= William Alford Lloyd =

William Alford Lloyd (c. 1826–1880) was an English self-taught zoologist who became the first professional aquarist.

Inspired by Gosse's new book, The Aquarium, published in 1854 Lloyd, who worked for a bookseller, began keeping marine animals in glass tanks. On 14 July 1855 he opened a shop advertised in Notes & Queries as “selling everything relating to aquaria” at 164 St John Street Road, Clerkenwell, London. In 1856 he opened a new shop “The Aquarium Warehouse” at 20, Portland Road, Regent's Park and in 1860 he supervised the installation of an aquarium The Gardens of the Society of Acclimatation in Bois de Boulogne in Paris.

By the 1860s the aquarium craze was over, at least in England, and Lloyd went bankrupt. In 1862, supported by Richard Owen he moved to Grindel Dammthor, Hamburg, to supervise the installation of the circulating system and tanks at the Hamburg Aquarium. Success in Germany led to his appointment as Superintendent of the Crystal Palace Aquarium two years before it opened in 1871. Anton Dohrn, who had made Lloyd's acquaintance in 1866 at the Hamburg aquarium invited him to install the aquaria at Stazione Zoologica at Naples in the spring of 1873. Here some of Lloyd's circulating system was still operating well into the 20th century. Anton Dohrn's professional biological station flourished and the Swedish Professor Loven of Sweden, who planned a research establishment sent a representative to London to consult with Lloyd. In England Lloyd's last post was as superintendent at the Aston Aquarium, Birmingham.
