= Marco Marcola =

Italian painter

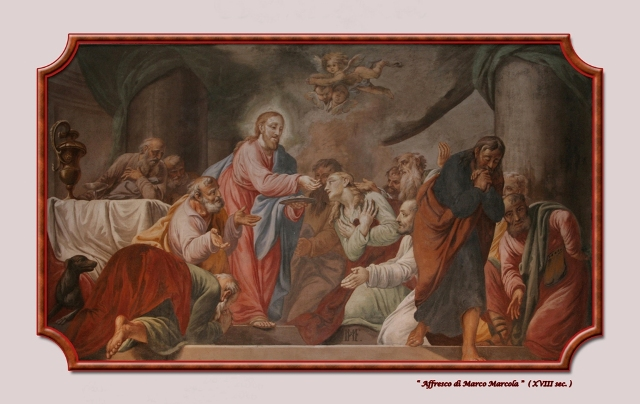
Last Supper

Marco Marcola (1740–1793) was an Italian painter, born and mainly active in Verona. He was initially apprenticed to his father Giovanni Battista Marcola. Among his pupils were Antonio Pachera, Bellino Bellini, and Domenico Zanconti. He is also known as Marco Marcuola. His sister Angela Marcola was also a painter.

== Sources ==
- Zannandreis, Diego (1891). Giuseppe Biadego (ed.). Le vite dei pittori, scultori e architetti veronesi. Verona: Stabilimento Tipo-Litografico G. Franchini. p. 478.
