= Luigi Frisoni =

Italian painter

Luigi Frisoni (1760 – 10 January 1811) was an Italian painter, born in Verona. He initially apprenticed with Antonio Pachera. He taught in the local academy of painters.

== Sources ==
- Zannandreis, Diego (1891). Giuseppe Biadego (ed.). Le vite dei pittori, scultori e architetti veronesi. Verona: Stabilimento Tipo-Litografico G. Franchini. pp. 514–515. "zannandreis."
