= Joseph Edward Rall =

Joseph Edward Rall (February 3, 1920 – February 28, 2008) was an American endocrinologist and research director at the National Institutes of Health. He was an expert on the thyroid gland, particularly its proteins and its relationship with radioactive iodine.

== Early life and education ==
Rall was born in 1920 in Naperville, Illinois. He obtained a B.A. from North Central College in 1941 before enrolling at Northwestern University. At Northwestern, he served as a teaching assistant and a research fellow in pharmacology while completing his studies; he received a Master's degree in 1944 and an M.D. in 1945. His residency and fellowship at Mayo Clinic in Rochester, Minnesota, which began in 1945, was interrupted by two years of military service in Germany with the Medical Corps following the Second World War. He eventually completed his fellowship at Mayo Clinic in 1950. He developed an interest in endocrinology, the thyroid and radioactive iodine at Mayo, and in 1952 he was awarded a PhD by the University of Minnesota for research on the metabolism of thyroxine.

== Career ==
In 1950, Rall relocated to New York City to work at Memorial Sloan Kettering Cancer Center alongside Rulon Rawson, who was investigating the use of radioactive iodine in the treatment of thyroid cancer. In New York, he was an assistant professor at Cornell University Medical College and began research into radiation-induced thyroid cancer as a result of hydrogen bomb testing in the Marshall Islands. He also begun a lifelong collaboration with Jacob Robbins, with whom he studied thyroid proteins including thyroglobulin, and established the "free thyroxine hypothesis", which holds that thyroxine is only active when not bound to protein.

Rall was recruited by the National Institutes of Health in Bethesda, Maryland, to run a new laboratory, the Clinical Endocrinology Branch (CEB), at the National Institute of Arthritis and Metabolic Diseases. The branch initially focused on thyroid physiology and diseases, but later expanded to encompass diabetes as well as disorders of growth hormone and the gonads. Under Rall, the CEB hosted many visiting international scientists and had a longstanding association with the laboratory run by Nino Salvatore in Italy. In 1962, Rall was appointed Director of Intramural Research of the National Institute of Diabetes and Digestive and Kidney Diseases. He served as Deputy Director for Intramural Research for NIH in 1983 until his retirement in 1990.

Rall was elected to the U.S. National Academy of Sciences, the French Société de biologie and the Belgian Royal Academy of Medicine, and received honorary degrees from the University of Naples (Italy) and Charles University (Czech Republic). He was president of the American Thyroid Association (ATA) in 1964 and received distinguished service awards from the ATA and the Endocrine Society.

== Death ==
Rall died on February 28, 2008, aged 88.
