= Antonio Pachera =

Italian painter (1749–1791)

Antonio Pachera (5 July 1749 – 14 September 1791) was an Italian painter, born in Verona.

== Biography ==
He initially apprenticed with Marco Marcola. He was the son of Francesco Pachera. He taught in the local academy of painters. Luigi Frisoni was one of his pupils. He painted the Bishop St. Zeno and St. Toscana for the chiesa degli Esposti. For the church of Santa Maria della Scala, he painted the altarpiece of the chapel of S. Maria Maddalena, depicting St Luigi Gonzaga in glory, above purgatorial souls. For the church of the Riformati, a Triumphal Christ enters Jerusalem. For the church of St. Theresa, he painted a St. Luigi Gonzaga in glory, as seen by the ecstatic St. Maria Maddalena de' Pazzi. For the Pellegrini palace, he frescoed a room with quadratura by Pasquale Cioffo. For the casa Arvedi alle Campane, he painted scenes from Ovid's Metamorphosis. At age 21 years, he had won a first prize in painting from the Accademia di Belle Arti di Parma.

== Sources ==
- Zannandreis, Diego (1891). Giuseppe Biadego (ed.). Le vite dei pittori, scultori e architetti veronesi. Verona: Stabilimento Tipo-Litografico G. Franchini. p. 549.
