= George Stuart Carter =

British zoologist and zoological author

Dr George Stuart Carter FRSE FLS FZS (1893–1969) was a leading British zoologist and zoological author.

== Life ==
He was born on 15 September 1893, the son of Rev G C Carter and Hilda E Keane.

He studied at Marlborough College and then was awarded a place at Cambridge University, where he continued also at postgraduate level, gaining a PhD in Zoology. His studies were interrupted by the First World War: he served in the 6th Leicestershire Regiment from 1914-1917 and then as a Sound Ranger in the Royal Engineers 1917 to 1919.

After the war he obtained a post at the Stazione Zoologica in Naples where he worked 1922 to 1923 before receiving a post as a lecturer in Zoology at Glasgow University. He stayed at Glasgow until 1930, then receiving a Fellowship from Corpus Christi College, Cambridge, lecturing there from 1938 until retiral in 1960 .

He was elected a Fellow of the Royal Society of Edinburgh in 1925. He died in Cambridge on 2 December 1969.

== Publications ==
- A General Zoology of the Invertebrates (1940)
- Animal Evolution. London: Sidgwick and Jackson. 1951 – via Internet Archive.
- The Papyrus Swamps of Uganda (1955)
- A Hundred Years of Evolution. London: Sidgwick and Jackson. 1957 – via Internet Archive.
- Structure and Habitat in Vertebrate Evolution (1967)
