= Domenico Zanconti =

Italian painter (1739–1816)

Domenico Zaconti (1739–1816) was an Italian painter, born in Pescantina and mainly active in Verona. He was a pupil of the painter Marco Marcuola. He mainly painted sacred subjects.

== Sources ==
- Zannandreis, Diego (1891). Giuseppe Biadego (ed.). Le vite dei pittori, scultori e architetti veronesi. Verona: Stabilimento Tipo-Litografico G. Franchini. pp. 476–477.
