= Giovanni Battista Marcola =

Italian painter

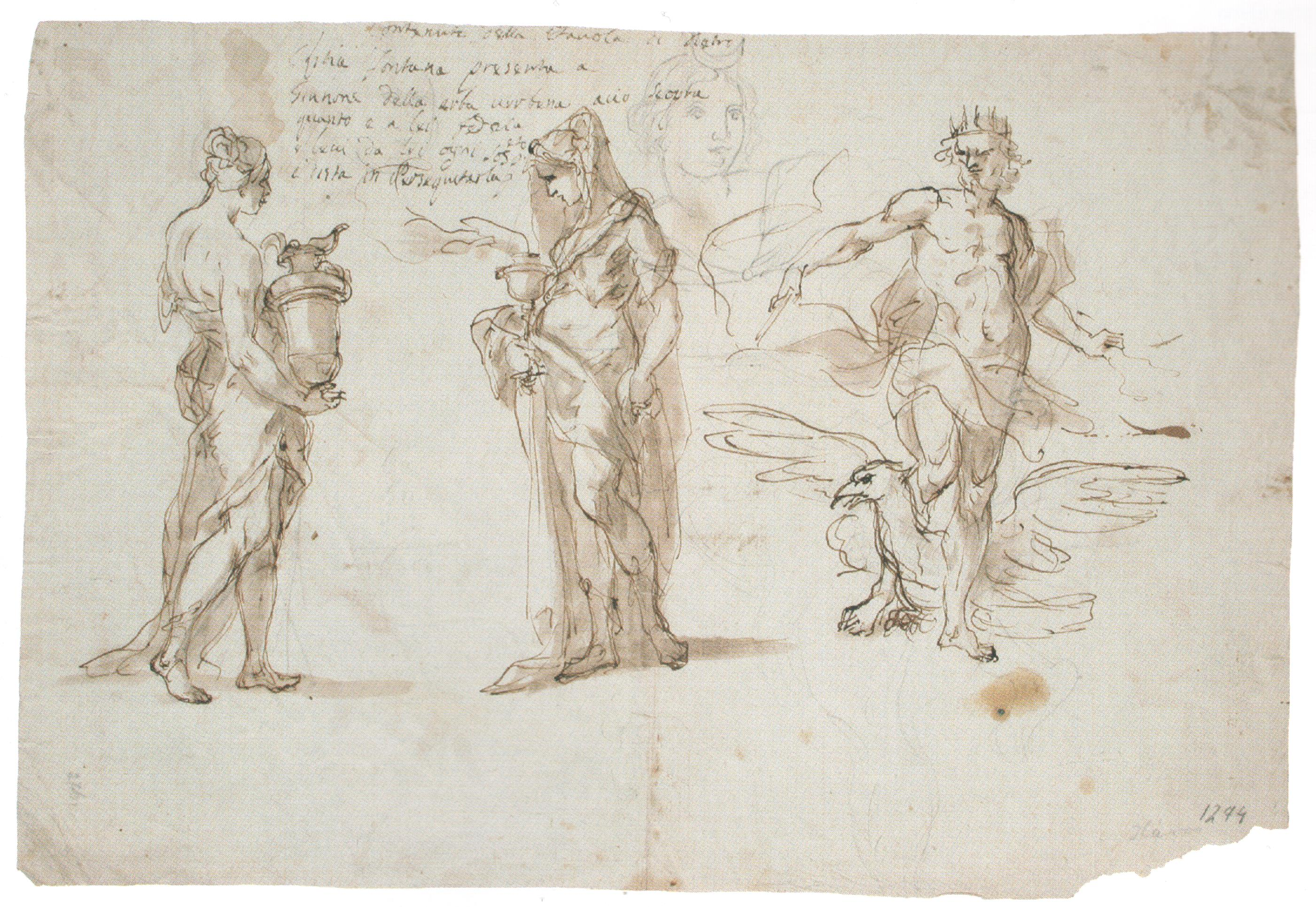

Giovanni Battista Marcola (c. 1711 -c. 1780) was an Italian painter, born and mainly active in Verona. He initially apprenticed with Simone Brentana. One of his pupils was his son Marco Marcola. He painted for the church of Santa Maria della Scala, a set of scenes of the Life of San Filippo Benizzi. He painted a Sant'Andrea Avellino with the Blessed Marinonio for the church of San Vincenzo in Modena.

== Sources ==
- Zannandreis, Diego (1891). Giuseppe Biadego (ed.). Le vite dei pittori, scultori e architetti veronesi. Verona: Stabilimento Tipo-Litografico G. Franchini. p. 390.
