= Ida Henrietta Hyde =

American physiologist (1857–1945)

- Born: September 8, 1857; Davenport, Iowa
- Died: August 22, 1945 (aged 87); Berkeley, California
- Education: Cornell University; University of Heidelberg
- Known for: Micro-electrode
- Relatives: Arthur Pardee (grezt nephew)

Ida Henrietta Hyde (September 8, 1857 – August 22, 1945) was an American physiologist known for developing a micro-electrode powerful enough to stimulate tissue chemically or electronically, yet small enough to inject or remove tissue from a cell. Ida was agnostic in her religious standing. She retired at the age in 63 in the year 1920. After her retirement, Ida traveled to several places, including Switzerland, Austria, Egypt, India, and several locations in Germany. On August 22, 1945, Ida Hyde died of a cerebral hemorrhage. Ida Hyde is the great-aunt of biochemist Arthur Pardee.

== Childhood ==
Born in Davenport, Iowa, Ida was one of four children to Meyer and Babette (Lowenthal) Heidenheimer, German immigrants from Württemberg. The surname Hyde was taken after their arrival in the United States. Ida's father was a merchant that worked out of home and who left the family on one of his trips, leaving Babette to care for the children. In order to keep the family afloat, they moved to Chicago, where Babette took in jobs of cleaning and mending until she was able to start a prosperous business. All of the children were able and sent to public school and became educated middle class individuals, with the intention of Ida's only brother Ben, to attend university.

In 1871, the family home was destroyed in the Great Fire of Chicago, which destroyed the family business as well. Without any form of income, Ida as the oldest daughter entered the work force at age 14 as a milliner's apprentice. Because of her age, older than that of her siblings, much of the burden of supporting the family fell on her. She brought in a large portion of the family income, and even paid for her only brother's education at the University of Illinois. Over time, she rose in her occupation to the job of saleslady. Her experience in the clothing store proved to be valuable later in life because of her ability to fashion her own clothing with minimal supplies.

== Education ==
At the store where she worked, Hyde chanced upon an English version of Ansichten der Natur (View of Nature) by Alexander von Humboldt. It was from this work that her love of biology was born. In addition, it spurred her toward continuing her education, which she did by attending night classes at the Chicago Athenaeum during 1875–76 in spite of her parents' objections. Her further educational studies came to her while she was visiting her brother at his university and chanced upon meeting several women working in academia. She was able to pass her entrance exams for the College Preparatory School and later entered the same university as her brother.

Ida began studying at the University of Illinois at the age of 24, but her study was cut short when her brother became sick in 1882 and she had to attend to him. She also used all of her savings for just one year of education. However, she passed the county teacher's exam and, three years later, the Chicago teacher's exams, and for the next seven years she worked as a teacher of second- and third-graders within the Chicago public school system. Her biological pursuits were still expressed in her attempts to work nature studies into the public school system. She saved money to put towards her tuition, remaining focused on her goal of attaining a college degree.

In 1888 she was finally able to return to the collegiate scene at the age of 31. She enrolled at Cornell University and earned her Bachelor of Arts degree in just three years. She was then offered a biology scholarship at Bryn Mawr College. She accepted and began under the tutelage of Jacques Loeb and Thomas Hunt Morgan. As an assistant at Woods Hole Biological Laboratory, she conducted research on the nervous system of jellyfish. She produced many detailed drawings and descriptions of the nerve cells. In 1893, Hyde received a European Fellowship from the Association of Collegiate Alumnae, which would later become the American Association of University Women.

Ida's results from the research at Woods Hole is said to have helped motivate Dr. Goette in inviting her to come to University of Strasbourg in 1893, to work with him even as no woman had done previously. Hyde, during her attendance at Strasbourg, was the first woman in Germany to have ever petitioned to matriculate for an advanced degree in natural science or mathematics. At the time it was necessary to petition the government and get permission from the faculty. Before this process went fully into motion Ida withdrew her attempts. It is said that the large number of people who spoke out against Ida going through with the petition is what was the cause of that decision, and that Heidelberg University would be a better place to gain her degree.

Ida received her Ph.D. at Heidelberg University, Germany at age 39 after many frustrating obstacles presented because of her gender. She was not allowed to attend some lectures, and had to read the notes of male students. She was required to go beyond the work of an average student to receive her degree, and became the third woman to graduate with a doctorate there. The main problem in obtaining her degree was that her teaching professor, Wilhelm Kühne, disliked the thought of allowing a woman to work under him. But her accomplishments eventually surmounted his opposition and she passed the doctoral examinations with honor in February 1896 and became the first woman to receive a doctorate from this institution. Her thesis project examined the physiological development of jellyfish (Hydromedusa).

Ida researched at several other institutions before going to the University of Kansas (KU) including University of Berne 1896, and Radcliffe College 1897. After she started working at KU, Hyde also studied at Rush Medical College over several summers to receive her M. D. in 1911.

== Career ==
In the course of Ida's seven years of teaching she was involved in establishing the “Science in the Schools” program in Chicago's public school system. This program helped to introduce nature studies into these school, where Ida was even known for sharing her own teaching methods with the other educators.

Following completion of her doctorate, she was invited to Naples, Italy as the Investigator of Residence at the Naples Zoological Station, a prestigious post. She continued work on marine invertebrate physiology, until moving to the University of Bern, Switzerland to work with Dr. Kronecker on muscle physiology. She became the first woman admitted to do research at Harvard Medical School under W.T. Porter. While continuing her research, she also furthered her education and medical training at Harvard. Hyde remained an educator as well, teaching classes at preparatory schools and at Woods Hole during the summer.

She was hired as an Associate Professor by the University of Kansas in 1899 and founded the Department of Physiology, also serving as its first Chairman of the Department of Physiology, where she worked for 22 years.

Over her career, Hyde's research covered the nervous, circulatory, and the respiratory systems of vertebrates and invertebrates, and explored the effects of narcotics, caffeine, and alcohol on the body. Also in the course of her work she noted the differences in the effects of music on the cardiovascular system in athletes, musicians, and farmers, and caffeine being the cause of decreased efficiency in physical work. She was the first woman elected into the American Society of Physiologists in 1902, and was its only female member until 1913.

=== Microelectrode ===
Hyde was a researcher and professor, but also an inventor and innovator. She developed instruments for monitoring physiological parameters in a marine animal that could be used in seawater. Her most well-known invention was an intracellular micropipette electrode (known as microelectrode). Dr. Hyde had observed that electrolytes in high concentrations affect processes of cell division, leading to her noting the minute differences in electrical potential within cells. In order to understand how these nerve and muscle cells work, she needed to be able to stimulate the cells properly and be able to record the results of the change occurring in the currents of the individual cells. Ida's microelectrode can be used for stimulating cells at the micro level while recording electrical activity within the cell without disturbing the cellular wall. This device was a revolutionary invention in neurophysiology and the study of contractile nerve tissue, however, the micro electrode was never officially attributed to Ida as being its first inventor.

Though Dr. Hyde's possible microelectrode invention was reported in 1921, several others also created electrodes similar to Ida's, while scientific historians such as G. Kass-Simon have accredited Hyde's invention as being the original and revolutionary. Another microelectrode was supposedly invented another time, about twenty years after Ida was said to have made her version of this invention, by Judith Graham and Ralph W. Gerard from the University of Chicago. Then in the 1950s, Gerard was nominated for a Nobel Prize, because of his developed model of the microelectrode.

=== Selected publications ===
- Notes on the Hearts of Certain Mammals. The American Naturalist 25(298) 1891. pp. 861–863. JSTOR 2451734
- The Nervous System in Goneomea Murbachii. Biological Bulletin 4(1) 1902. pp. 40–45. JSTOR 1535511
- The Kaiser and the Devilfish. The New York Evening Post Magazine, May 25, 1918.
- A micro-electrode and unicellular stimulation. Biol. Bull. 40:130–133, 1921.
- Effects of music upon electrocardiograms and blood pressure. J. Exp. Psychol. 7:213–224 1924.

=== Human health contributions ===
Ida Hyde lectured on multiple occasions within and outside of the University of Kansas. With the aid of area physicians, she established a program of public medical examination of school children for communicable diseases such as tuberculosis and spinal meningitis. Though she was not a true medical professional, she was elected to membership in the Kansas Medical Society because of her expertise in the knowledge and control of infectious diseases. And in 1918 she was appointed State Chairman of the Kansas Women's Committee on Health, Sanitation and National Defense. A notable proportion of the lectures Ida held in her career were on hygiene and spreadable diseases. Dr. Hyde spoke openly about human sexuality and its involvement in the spread of disease, as well as being an open promoter of public health education.

=== Anti-discrimination efforts ===
It was not until I had worked many days in the splendid laboratory assigned to my private use that it dawned upon me that I was occupying a unique position... In the university circle the news quickly spread that an American "woman's rights" freak... had had the boldness and audacity to force entrance into the college halls. — Ida H. Hyde, "Before Women Were Human Beings".

Hyde repeatedly encountered barriers to her education and career due to her gender, and pressed for more equal access and treatment of women in academia throughout her life. When she was denied the right to enroll in Strasburg University because of her gender, she went to Heidelberg University. Although she was allowed to matriculate, the university's medical school did not permit women, and the faculty denied her entry to physiology lectures or laboratories. Fortunately, her male colleagues shared their lecture notes, and after intense study she passed her doctoral examinations with honor. She wrote about her difficulties in a revealing account in the AAUW Journal entitled "Before Women Were Human Beings".

After returning to America, Hyde enlisted the help of many fellow women academics and wealthy female benefactors to create a fund to support women in science. The Naples Table Association became a source of both financial aid and professional support for women in scientific research, with 36 women benefiting from the program. In 1927, she established a scholarship at the University of Kansas for women pursuing careers in the sciences, and endowed the Ida H. Hyde International Fellowship with the Association of American University Women (AAUW). On the campus of KU, she pushed for toilet facilities in the science buildings; these buildings were built with only restrooms provided for men, assuming there would be no need for women's facilities. She repeatedly pressed the university for equal pay and worked in the community to increase the opportunities for women in diverse professions.
