= Bellino (surname) =

Bellino is an Italian surname. Notable people with the surname include:

- Dan Bellino (born 1978), American baseball umpire
- Joe Bellino (1938–2019), American football player
- Joe Bellino (politician) (born 1958), American politician
- Paolo Bellino (born 1969), Italian hurdler
- Pietro Bellino (died 1641), Italian Roman Catholic bishop
