= Jacob Robbins =

American endocrinologist and researcher

Jacob Robbins (September 1, 1922 – May 12, 2008) was an American endocrinologist known for his research on the thyroid gland. He established the "free thyroxine hypothesis", which holds that thyroxine is only active when not bound to protein, and performed long-term research on the incidence of thyroid cancer caused by radiation in survivors of nuclear fallout.

== Biography ==
Robbins was born in 1922 in Yonkers, New York. He attended Cornell University, completing an undergraduate degree in chemistry in 1944 and graduating from Cornell Medical College in 1947. He began working at Memorial Sloan Kettering Cancer Center in 1948 before moving to the National Institutes of Health in Bethesda, Maryland, in 1954 as an investigator. At NIH, he was chief of the Clinical Endocrinology Branch (part of the National Institute of Diabetes and Digestive and Kidney Diseases) from 1963 to 1991.

Robbins worked alongside Joseph E. Rall, another endocrinologist, during much of his career at NIH. Robbins and Rall founded the "free thyroxine hypothesis", which held that thyroxine—a hormone produced by the thyroid gland—is only effective when it is "free", or not bound to binding proteins. These observations guided the development of targeted doses for thyroxine replacement for patients with hypothyroidism. Robbins and Rall also performed important research on thyroid cancer caused by radiation; they followed survivors of the atomic bombings of Hiroshima and Nagasaki to monitor long-term outcomes. They also monitored inhabitants of the Marshall Islands who had been exposed to radiation during American hydrogen bomb tests and children who had been exposed to the fallout of the Chernobyl disaster. Robbins campaigned for wider availability of potassium iodide, a drug that prevents thyroid cancer after radiation exposure by blocking the absorption of radioactive iodine by the thyroid, for people living near nuclear power stations. His other research topics included the effectiveness of iodine-131 therapy in certain types of thyroid cancer, the use of triiodothyronine (T3) prior to iodine-131 therapy, the relationship between thyroid-stimulating hormone (TSH) and thyroglobulin, the use of lithium to increase iodine-131 uptake, and the safety of weekly dosing of thyroxine replacement compared with daily dosing.

Robbins served as editor-in-chief of Endocrinology from 1968 to 1972 and as president of the American Thyroid Association from 1974 to 1975. He was awarded the Public Health Service Meritorious Service Medal in 1971 and received an honorary degree from the University of Messina in 2001. He died of a cardiac arrest at the NIH Clinical Center on May 12, 2008.
