= Emily Ray Gregory =

American zoologist

Emily Ray Gregory (November 1, 1863 – 1946) was an American zoologist who is best known as holding the American Women's Table at the Naples Zoological Station and her work with the United States War Trade Board and the United States Treasury Department.

== Childhood and education ==
Emily Ray Gregory was born to Mary Jones and Henry Duval Gregory in Philadelphia on November 1, 1863. She attended Wellesley College where she earned her bachelor's degree in 1885. She then went to the University of Pennsylvania where she was a fellow from 1892 to 1893, and then received her master's degree in 1896. Additionally, she was a fellow at the University of Chicago from 1895 to 1897 and she received her doctorate in 1899.

== Career ==
After receiving her bachelor's degree in 1885, Gregory went to Philadelphia where she worked as a teacher in a variety of private girls' schools. She then worked at a girls' school in Baltimore while she completed her master's degree. In order to save enough money to pay for education for her doctoral degree, she worked at Woods Hole during the summers from 1893 to 1895. While working on her doctoral degree, she wired as an assistant in zoology from 1897 to 1899. From 1899 to 1900, Gregory held the American Women's Table at the Naples Zoological Station. She then worked as a professor of biology from 1901 to 1909 at Wells College. Afterward, she went to Constantinople from 1909 to 1911 where she taught at the American College for Girls. She was also an instructor at the University of Akron from 1913 to 1915 and served as a substitute teacher at Wellesley College and Sweet Briar College from 1915 to 1917. After completing her teaching career, she worked for the War Trade Board and the United States Treasury Department from 1919 to 1924 in Washington D.C., where she researched a variety of topics. Some of her research topics encompassed the development of turtle excretory systems and the emergence of the pronephric duct in Selachians. Additionally she studied embryos and developed a new method for injecting them.

== Later life and death ==
Toward the end of her life, Gregory returned to Philadelphia. She died in 1946.

== Etymology ==
Gregory has had a portion of the digestive track of sand dollars, Gregory's diverticulum, named in her honor.
