= Hugo Eisig =

German zoologist (1847–1920)

Hugo Eisig (1847, in Baden – 10 February 1920) was a German marine zoologist.

Hugo Eisig was a student of Ernst Haeckel. He served as a first assistant (1872–1909), then as a vice-director at Stazione Zoologica in Naples.

Eisig was an expert on polychaete worms and in 1887 published "Die Capitelliden des Golfes von Neapel und der angrenzenden Meeres-Abschnitte: eine Monographie" (Volume 16 of Fauna und Flora des Golfes von Neapel). He also wrote "Zur Systematik, Anatomie und Morphologie der Ariciiden nebst Beiträgen zur generellen Systematik"; Mitteilungen aus der Zoologischen Station zu Neapel, 21(6): 153–600 (1914).

== Taxa ==
- Centroderes eisigii (Zelinka, 1928)
- Cerebratulus eisigii (Hubrecht, 1880)
