= Bellino Bellini =

Italian painter

Bellino Bellini (Venice, 1741- October 24, 1799) was an Italian painter, of the Rococo period.

== Biography ==
He trained in Verona under Marco Marcuola. He mainly painted portraits. He traveled and worked extensively in Russia.
