= Raffaello Bellini =

Italian zoologist

Raffaello Bellini (1874 – 1930) was an Italian zoologist.

== Biography ==
Raffaello Bellini taught at Regia Scuola Tecnica Statale, Chivasso. He was a non-resident Member of Società dei naturalisti in Napoli. Similarly to other distinguished naturalists (Oronzio Gabriele Costa, Achille Costa, Arcangelo Scacchi, etc.), he collaborated with the University of Naples Federico II.

Together with the leading scholars of malacology then present in Naples (Ignazio Cerio, Tommaso di Maria Allery Monterosato, etc.), he contributed to a thorough knowledge of the fauna of the Gulf of Naples. For nearly fifty years, his catalogue of molluscs constituted the only general contribution on marine malacofauna of the Gulf of Naples.

He described some new Molluscan species. Parts of his natural history collection are held by the Zoological Museum of Naples and by Centro Caprese Ignazio Cerio on Capri.

== Works ==
- Nautilus subasii, nuova forma del Lias superiore. Bollettino della Società dei Naturalisti in Napoli, s. 2, 29: 17-19.
- Alcuni nuovi fossili sinemuriani dell'Appennino centrale Tipografia della Pace di F. Cuggiani, 1904
- Alcuni appunti per la geologia dell’Isola diCapri. Bollettino della Società Geologica Italiana, Roma, 21(1):7-14.
- Appendice alla Synopsis dei molluschi terrestri e fluviatili della provincia di Napoli.
- I molluschi extramarini dei dintorni di Napoli. - Bollettino della Società dei Naturalisti, Napoli, 27/1914:149-194.
- I molluschi del Golfo Napoli (Studi precedenti, l'ambiente, enumerazione e sinonimia). Annali del Museo Zoologico R. Università di Napoli,6: 1–87
- I Molluschi del Lago Fusaro e del Mar Morto dei Campi Flegrei. Bollettino della Società di Naturalisti in Napoli 16: 20-27 (1903)
- La distribuzione geografica dei Molluschi terrestri e l’ipotesi della Tirrenide. - Rivista di Biologia, Roma,6(6): 218-221.
- La Mitra zonata Marryat nella fauna malacologica dell'Isola di Capri, Estratto Boll. Soc. Naturalisti, 17: 82-94.(1903)
- Nel campo della fauna dell’Isola di Capri. – Le pagine dell’Isola di Capri, Capri (NA), (agosto 1922): 3-4.
- Osservazioni a favore della «Tirrenide». - Bollettino della Società Geologica Italiana, Roma, 45: 184-192.
- Osservazioni nell’Isola di Capri a conferma dell’antico stato della regione tirrena. - Bollettino della Società dei Naturalisti, Napoli, 32: 125-140.
- Osservazioni geomorfologiche nell'isola di Capri in Atti della Società Italiana di Scienze Naturali e del Museo civico di Storia Naturale in Milano, (1910)
- Studio sintetico sulla geologia dell'isola di Capri Atti della Società Italiana di Scienze Naturali e del Museo civico di Storia Naturale in Milano, LV, Pavia (1916)
- The freshwatershells of Naples and the neighbourhood Journal of Conchology Vol. II. April, 1904. No. 2. Read before the Society, December 1903 pdf
- Ulteriori osservazioni sui molluschi terrestri dei dintorni di Napoli. Rivista Italiana di Scienze Naturali, Siena, 19(9-10): 1-8.
