= Ernst Ehlers =

German zoologist (1835–1925)

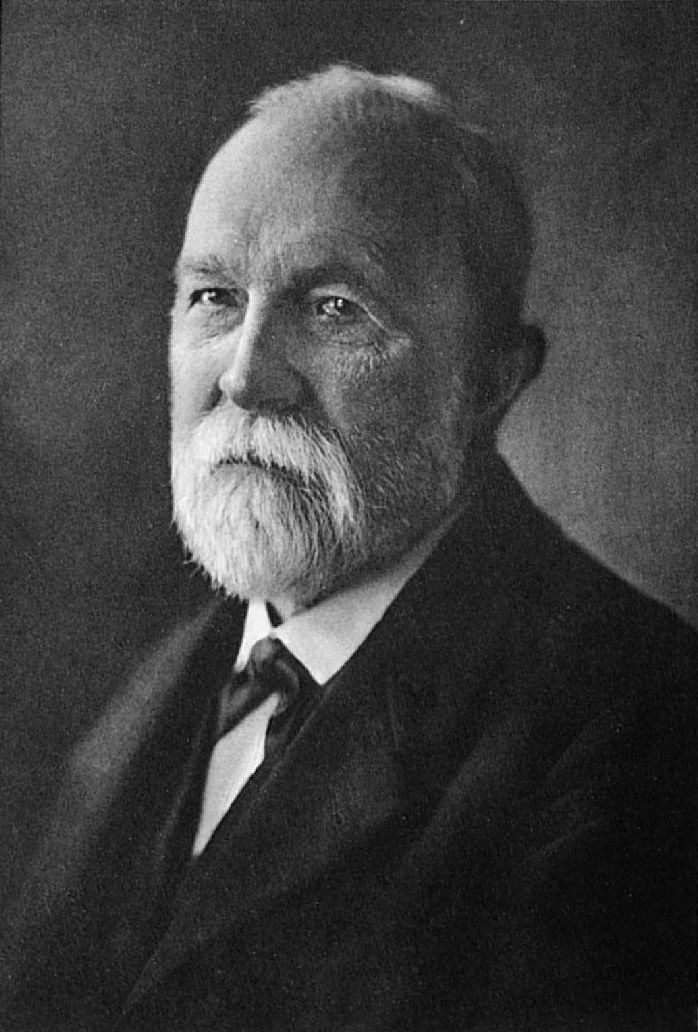
Ernst Heinrich Ehlers (1835-1925)

Ernst Heinrich Ehlers (11 November 1835 – 31 December 1925) was a German zoologist born in Lüneburg.

He studied medicine and natural sciences at the University of Göttingen, earning his doctorate in 1861. Here he was influenced by Rudolf Wagner (1805–1864) and Wilhelm Moritz Keferstein (1833–1870). In 1869 he became a full professor of zoology, comparative anatomy and veterinary medicine at the University of Erlangen. From 1874 to 1919, he was a professor of zoology and comparative anatomy in Göttingen. In 1890 he was one of the founders of the Deutschen Zoologischen Gesellschaft (German Zoological Society).

He was a leading authority on polychaetes, and is credited with describing many invertebrate species new to science. The polychaete genus Ehlersia (de Quatrefages, 1866) from the family Syllidae is named after him.

== Selected writings ==
- Die Borstenwürmer (Annelida Chaetopoda) nach systematischen und anatomischen Untersuchungen dargestellt, (1864-68) – Bristle worms (Annelida Chaetopoda) according to systematic and anatomical studies.
- Polychaeten, 1897 – Polychaetes.
- Polychaeten Hamburger Magelhaensische Sammelreise, 1897 – Polychaetes from the Hamburg Magellanic collection mission.
- Die Polychaeten des Magellanischen und Chilenischen Strandes, 1901 – Polychaetes of the Magellanic and Chilean shores.
- Neuseelandische Anneliden, 1904 – New Zealand annelids.
- Polychaeten von Java und Amboina. Ein beitrag zur kenntnis der malaiischen strandfauna, 1920 – Polychaetes of Java and Amboina.
