= 1977 Bolivarian Games =

VIII Bolivarian Games
- Host city: La Paz
- Country: Bolivia
- Nations: 6
- Events: 16 sports
- Opening: October 15, 1977
- Closing: October 29, 1977
- Opened by: Hugo Banzer
- Torch lighter: Julia Iriarte
- Main venue: Estadio Olímpico La Paz

The VIII Bolivarian Games (Spanish: Juegos Bolivarianos) were a multi-sport event held between October 15–29, 1977, at the Estadio Olímpico La Paz in La Paz, Bolivia. The Games were organized by the Bolivarian Sports Organization (ODEBO).

The Games were officially opened by Bolivian president, General Hugo Banzer. Torch lighter was Athlete Julia Iriarte, who won five gold and three silver medals in the eight events at the 1947-48 Bolivarian Games.

The stadium in La Paz was one of the first in South America equipped with a synthetic track for the athletics running events. Because the stadium is situated 3,650 metres above sea level, and this about the first time that a big international sports event of that size took place at this altitude, there was a substantial medical interest in its influence on both the performance and the health of the athletes.

A detailed history of the early editions of the Bolivarian Games between 1938 and 1989 was published in a book written (in Spanish) by José Gamarra Zorrilla, former president of the Bolivian Olympic Committee, and first president (1976-1982) of ODESUR. Gold medal winners from Ecuador were published by the Comité Olímpico Ecuatoriano.

== Participation ==
Athletes from 6 countries were reported to participate:

- Bolivia
- Colombia
- Ecuador
- Panama
- Peru
- Venezuela

== Sports ==
The following 16 sports were explicitly mentioned:

- Aquatic sports
  - Diving
  - Swimming
  - Water polo
- Athletics
- Basketball
- Bowling
- Boxing
- Cycling
  - Road cycling
  - Track cycling
- Equestrian
- Fencing
- Football
- Gymnastics (artistic)
- Judo
- Shooting
- Tennis
- Volleyball
- Weightlifting
- Wrestling

== Medal count ==
The medal count for these Games is tabulated below. A slightly different number of medals was published elsewhere. This table is sorted by the number of gold medals earned by each country. The number of silver medals is taken into consideration next, and then the number of bronze medals.

1977 Bolivarian Games Medal Count
Rank	Nation	Gold	Silver	Bronze	Total
1	Venezuela	79	71	51	201
2	Colombia	36	36	22	94
3	Peru	26	34	35	95
4	Ecuador	19	17	39	75
5	Bolivia	15	20	36	71
6	Panama	10	7	5	22
Total		185	185	188	558
