= 1948 South American Championships in Athletics (unofficial) – Results =

These are the results of the unofficial 1948 South American Championships in Athletics which took place in La Paz, Bolivia, between 12 and 17 October.

== Men's results ==
=== 100 metres ===
Heats – 12 October

Rank	Heat	Name	Nationality	Time	Notes
1	1	Rodolfo López	Chile	11.0	Q
2	1	Carlos Ribeiro	Uruguay	11.2	Q
3	1	Alfredo Calvo	Bolivia	11.3	Q
1	2	Gerardo Salazar	Peru	10.6	Q
2	2	Alberto Labarthe	Chile	11.0	Q
3	2	Miguel León Pizarro	Peru	11.0	Q

Final – 13 October

Rank	Name	Nationality	Time	Notes
1st place, gold medalist(s)	Gerardo Salazar	Peru	10.6	
2nd place, silver medalist(s)	Miguel León Pizarro	Peru	10.7	
3rd place, bronze medalist(s)	Rodolfo López	Chile	11.0	
4	Carlos Ribeiro	Uruguay	11.1	
5	Alfredo Calvo	Bolivia	11.7	
	Alberto Labarthe	Chile	DNS	

=== 200 metres ===
Heats – 15 October

Rank	Heat	Name	Nationality	Time	Notes
1	1	Gerardo Salazar	Peru	22.1	Q
2	1	Carlos Ribeiro	Uruguay	22.2	Q
3	1	Rodolfo López	Chile	22.9	Q
1	2	Miguel León Pizarro	Peru	22.6	Q
2	2	Mateo Durruty	Chile	22.8	Q
3	2	Ariel Arce	Bolivia	22.9	Q

Final – ? October

Rank	Name	Nationality	Time	Notes
1st place, gold medalist(s)	Gerardo Salazar	Peru	21.8	
2nd place, silver medalist(s)	Rodolfo López	Chile	22.4	
3rd place, bronze medalist(s)	Carlos Ribeiro	Uruguay	23.1	
4	Miguel León Pizarro	Peru	23.2	
5	Ariel Arce	Bolivia	23.3	
6	Mateo Durruty	Chile	23.5	

=== 400 metres ===
Heats – 12 October

Rank	Heat	Name	Nationality	Time	Notes
1	1	Sergio Guzmán	Chile	52.6	Q
2	1	Antero Mongrut	Peru	53.7	Q
3	1	Carlos Ribeiro	Uruguay	54.0	Q
1	2	Eduardo Laca	Peru	52.1	Q
2	2	Reinaldo Martín	Chile	52.6	Q
3	2	Ariel Arce	Bolivia	53.1	Q

Final – 13 October

Rank	Name	Nationality	Time	Notes
1st place, gold medalist(s)	Eduardo Laca	Peru	50.5	
2nd place, silver medalist(s)	Reinaldo Martín	Chile	50.9	
3rd place, bronze medalist(s)	Sergio Guzmán	Chile	51.0	
4	Ariel Arce	Bolivia	51.2	
5	Carlos Ribeiro	Uruguay	51.2	
6	Antero Mongrut	Peru	52.0	

=== 800 metres ===
15 October

Rank	Name	Nationality	Time	Notes
1st place, gold medalist(s)	Antero Mongrut	Peru	2:04.3	
2nd place, silver medalist(s)	Rogelio Gómez	Peru	2:04.5	
3rd place, bronze medalist(s)	Sergio Guzmán	Chile	2:05.1	

=== 110 metres hurdles ===
13 October

Rank	Name	Nationality	Time	Notes
1st place, gold medalist(s)	Hernán Alzamora	Peru	14.8	
2nd place, silver medalist(s)	Edmundo Ohaco	Chile	15.3	
3rd place, bronze medalist(s)	Ivo Buratovich	Bolivia	15.4	
4	Hernán Figueroa	Chile	NT	
5	Carlos Bahamondes	Peru	NT	
6	Waldo Sotelo	Bolivia	NT	

=== 200 metres hurdles ===
17 October

Rank	Name	Nationality	Time	Notes
1st place, gold medalist(s)	Eduardo Laca	Peru	25.6	
2nd place, silver medalist(s)	Carlos Ribeiro	Peru	26.1	
3rd place, bronze medalist(s)	Sergio Guzmán	Chile	26.5	

=== 4 × 100 metres relay ===
13 October

Rank	Nation	Competitors	Time	Notes
1st place, gold medalist(s)	Peru	Gerardo Salazar, ?, ?, ?	42.8	
2nd place, silver medalist(s)	Chile	Sergio Guzmán, Carlos Vera, Rodolfo López, Mateo Durruty	43.2	
3rd place, bronze medalist(s)	Uruguay		44.4	
4	Bolivia		NT	

=== 4 × 400 metres relay ===
17 October

Rank	Nation	Competitors	Time	Notes
1st place, gold medalist(s)	Chile	Sergio Guzmán, Ramis, ?, Reinaldo Martín	3:26.3	
2nd place, silver medalist(s)	Peru	Carlos Bahamondes, ?, Eduardo Laca, Antero Mongrut	3:26.4	
3rd place, bronze medalist(s)	Uruguay	Carlos Ribeiro, ?, Saravia, Rodríguez	3:31.2	
4	Bolivia	Maldonado, ?, Alberdi, Ariel Arce	NT	

=== High jump ===
13 October

Rank	Name	Nationality	Result	Notes
1st place, gold medalist(s)	Hércules Azcune	Uruguay	1.90	
2nd place, silver medalist(s)	Pedro Listur	Uruguay	1.85	
3rd place, bronze medalist(s)	Alfredo Jadresic	Chile	1.80	
4	Carlos Vera	Chile	1.80	
5	Edmundo Macías	Peru	1.75	
6	Napoleón Araujo	Bolivia	1.75	

=== Pole vault ===
? October

Rank	Name	Nationality	Result	Notes
1st place, gold medalist(s)	Luis Ganoza	Peru	3.70	
2nd place, silver medalist(s)	Jaime Piqueras	Peru	3.70	
3rd place, bronze medalist(s)	Carlos Vera	Chile	3.60	
4	Ivo Buratovich	Bolivia	3.50	

=== Long jump ===
17 October

Rank	Name	Nationality	Result	Notes
1st place, gold medalist(s)	Carlos Vera	Chile	7.05	
2nd place, silver medalist(s)	Máximo Reyes	Peru	6.84	
3rd place, bronze medalist(s)	Hércules Azcune	Uruguay	6.71	
4	Ariel Arce	Bolivia	6.56	
5	Carlos Puebla	Chile	6.53	
6	Carlos Becerra	Bolivia	6.20	

=== Triple jump ===
15 October

Rank	Name	Nationality	Result	Notes
1st place, gold medalist(s)	Carlos Vera	Chile	14.65	
2nd place, silver medalist(s)	Máximo Reyes	Peru	14.27	
3rd place, bronze medalist(s)	Pedro Listur	Uruguay	13.72	
4	Carlos Puebla	Chile	13.48	

=== Shot put ===
13 October

Rank	Name	Nationality	Result	Notes
1st place, gold medalist(s)	Hernán Figueroa	Chile	13.50	
2nd place, silver medalist(s)	Ivo Buratovich	Bolivia	11.40	
3rd place, bronze medalist(s)	Edmundo Ohaco	Chile	11.30	
4	Atilio Accinelli	Peru	10.98	
5	Alberto Peirano	Peru	10.69	
6	José Borja	Bolivia	10.08	

=== Discus throw ===
? October

Rank	Name	Nationality	Result	Notes
1st place, gold medalist(s)	Hércules Azcune	Uruguay	38.24	
2nd place, silver medalist(s)	Atilio Accinelli	Peru	36.11	
3rd place, bronze medalist(s)	Hernán Figueroa	Chile	35.74	

=== Hammer throw ===
15 October

Rank	Name	Nationality	Result	Notes
1st place, gold medalist(s)	Edmundo Zúñiga	Chile	45.28	
2nd place, silver medalist(s)	Alberto Peirano	Peru	39.96	
3rd place, bronze medalist(s)	Atilio Accinelli	Peru	39.10	

=== Javelin throw ===
12 October – old model

Rank	Name	Nationality	Result	Notes
1st place, gold medalist(s)	Armin Nevermann	Chile	55.93	
2nd place, silver medalist(s)	Edmundo Ohaco	Chile	52.87	
3rd place, bronze medalist(s)	Hernán Alzamora	Peru	44.75	
4	Juan Roca	Bolivia	40.03	

== Women's results ==
=== 100 metres ===
12 October

Rank	Name	Nationality	Time	Notes
1st place, gold medalist(s)	Julia Iriarte	Bolivia	13.1	
2nd place, silver medalist(s)	Raquel Gamarra	Peru	13.2	
3rd place, bronze medalist(s)	Elena Amaya	Bolivia	13.3	

=== 200 metres ===
15 October

Rank	Name	Nationality	Time	Notes
1st place, gold medalist(s)	Julia Sánchez	Peru	26.1	
2nd place, silver medalist(s)	Elena Amaya	Bolivia	27.2	
3rd place, bronze medalist(s)	Julia Huapaya	Peru	27.9	

=== 80 metres hurdles ===
15 October

Rank	Name	Nationality	Time	Notes
1st place, gold medalist(s)	Julia Iriarte	Bolivia	12.1	
2nd place, silver medalist(s)	Emma Banzer	Bolivia	13.8	
3rd place, bronze medalist(s)	Hilda Yamasaki	Peru	14.7	

=== 4 × 100 metres relay ===
17 October

Rank	Nation	Competitors	Time	Notes
1st place, gold medalist(s)	Peru	Raquel Gamarra, Julia Sánchez, Julia Huapaya, Hilda Yamasaki	51.6	
2nd place, silver medalist(s)	Bolivia	Julia Iriarte, Carmela Antezana, Laura Ortiz, Elena Amaya	52.5	

=== High jump ===
17 October

Rank	Name	Nationality	Result	Notes
1st place, gold medalist(s)	Carmela Antezana	Bolivia	1.45	
2nd place, silver medalist(s)	Julia Sánchez	Peru	1.40	
3rd place, bronze medalist(s)	Julia Iriarte	Bolivia	1.40	

=== Long jump ===
? October

Rank	Name	Nationality	Result	Notes
1st place, gold medalist(s)	Julia Sánchez	Peru	5.04	
2nd place, silver medalist(s)	Julia Iriarte	Bolivia	5.01	
3rd place, bronze medalist(s)	Hilda Yamasaki	Peru	4.85	

=== Shot put ===
12 October

Rank	Name	Nationality	Result	Notes
1st place, gold medalist(s)	Julia Iriarte	Bolivia	10.94	
2nd place, silver medalist(s)	Julia Huapaya	Peru	10.11	
3rd place, bronze medalist(s)	Raquel Gamarra	Peru	8.22	
4	Laura Ortiz	Bolivia	6.75	

=== Discus throw ===
15 October

Rank	Name	Nationality	Result	Notes
1st place, gold medalist(s)	Julia Iriarte	Bolivia	33.66	
2nd place, silver medalist(s)	Julia Huapaya	Peru	33.54	
3rd place, bronze medalist(s)	Raquel Gamarra	Peru	24.33	

=== Javelin throw ===
13 October – old model

Rank	Name	Nationality	Result	Notes
1st place, gold medalist(s)	Julia Iriarte	Bolivia	32.16	
2nd place, silver medalist(s)	Raquel Gamarra	Peru	26.28	
3rd place, bronze medalist(s)	Laura Ortiz	Bolivia	18.50	
4	Julia Huapaya	Peru	17.80	
