= Julia Iriarte =

Personal information
- Full name: María Julia Iriarte Velasco
- Nickname: Chini
- Born: 20 December 1920 Tarata, Bolivia
- Died: 11 June 2015 (aged 94) Cochabamba, Bolivia

Sport
- Sport: Athletics, basketball
- Events: Sprints, 80 m hurdles, high jump, long jump, shot put, discus throw, javelin throw

María Julia Iriarte Velasco (married De Araoz; 20 December 1920 – 11 June 2015) was a Bolivian track and field athlete. Competing in a vast number of events, she is best know for sweeping the women's competition at the 1947–48 Bolivarian Games in Lima where she won five gold and three silver medals. She achieved a similar feat at the unofficial 1948 South American Championships in Athletics in La Paz where she also won eight medals. Next to athletics, she also played basketball at national level.

In recognition of her achievements she was selected as torch bearer at the 1977 Bolivarian Games held in La Paz. Gran Prix Julia Iriarte is held annually in her honour in Cochabamba.

== International competitions ==
Year	Competition	Venue	Position	Event	Notes
Representing Bolivia
1939	South American Championships	Lima, Peru	6th (h)	80 m hurdles	14.2 s
1939	South American Championships	Lima, Peru	4th	4 × 100 m relay	54.9 s
1939	South American Championships	Lima, Peru	4th	Discus throw	28.68 m
1941	South American Championships	Buenos Aires, Argentina	3rd	Shot put	10.45 m
1941	South American Championships	Buenos Aires, Argentina	4th	Discus throw	30.37 m
1943	South American Championships	Santiago, Chile	7th (h)	80 m hurdles	13.4 s
1943	South American Championships	Santiago, Chile	3rd	4 × 100 m relay	53.3 s
1943	South American Championships	Santiago, Chile	4th	Shot put	10.49 m
1943	South American Championships	Santiago, Chile	4th	Discus throw	34.11 m
1947	Bolivarian Games	Lima, Peru	2nd	50 m	7.0 s
1947	Bolivarian Games	Lima, Peru	1st	80 m hurdles	12.7 s
1947	Bolivarian Games	Lima, Peru	2nd	4 × 100 m relay	52.5 s
1947	Bolivarian Games	Lima, Peru	1st	High jump	1.36 m
1947	Bolivarian Games	Lima, Peru	1st	Long jump	5.01 m
1947	Bolivarian Games	Lima, Peru	1st	Shot put	10.77 m
1947	Bolivarian Games	Lima, Peru	1st	Discus throw	31.97 m
1947	Bolivarian Games	Lima, Peru	2nd	Javelin throw	29.58 m
1948	South American Championships (unofficial)	La Paz, Bolivia	1st	100 m	13.1 s
1948	South American Championships (unofficial)	La Paz, Bolivia	1st	80 m hurdles	12.1 s
1948	South American Championships (unofficial)	La Paz, Bolivia	2nd	4 × 100 m relay	52.5 s
1948	South American Championships (unofficial)	La Paz, Bolivia	3rd	High jump	1.40 m
1948	South American Championships (unofficial)	La Paz, Bolivia	2nd	Long jump	5.01 m
1948	South American Championships (unofficial)	La Paz, Bolivia	1st	Shot put	10.94 m
1948	South American Championships (unofficial)	La Paz, Bolivia	1st	Discus throw	33.66 m
1948	South American Championships (unofficial)	La Paz, Bolivia	1st	Javelin throw	32.16 m
