= Alfredo Jadresic =

Chilean high jumper (1925–2021)

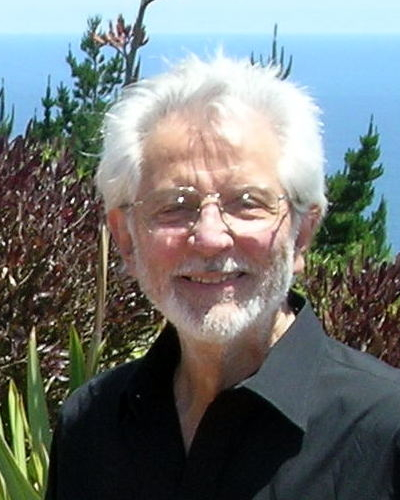
Alfredo Jadresic at his vacation house at Tunquén (Chile), November 2005

Alfredo Arturo Jadresic Vargas (18 September 1925 – 30 September 2021) was a Chilean scientist and professor of medicine. As a high jumper he competed in the 1948 Summer Olympics, and placed ninth.

== Personal life ==
Jadresic was born in Iquique in September 1925. He came from a family of Croatian (Dalmatian) origin. He died in Santiago on 1 October 2021, at the age of 96. According to another source the date was 30 September.

== Sports career ==
Year	Competition	Venue	Position	Notes
Representing Chile
1946	South American Championships (unofficial)	Santiago, Chile	3rd	1.90 m
1947	South American Championships	Rio de Janeiro, Brazil	1st	1.91 m
1948	Olympic Games	London, United Kingdom	9th	1.90 m
1948	South American Championships (unofficial)	La Paz, Bolivia	3rd	1.80 m
1949	South American Championships	Lima, Peru	3rd	1.85 m

His personal best in high jump was 1.95 metres set in 1947.

== Medical career ==
Jadresic got his Doctorate in medicine and was a professor of medicine at the University of Chile, and then Dean of Medicine from 1968 to 1972. In September 1973, after the coup d'état, he was arrested and spent 51 days in the National Stadium of Chile. He was released with no charges, but was forced to leave the country. He spent his exile in the Royal Sussex Hospital in Hastings, England. When democracy was restored he returned to Chile, where he specialized in endocrinology at the University of Chile. Jadresic gave an account of his career and life in a book published in 2007.
