= Alcides Dambrós =

Alcides Dambros
Personal information
- Born: 12 May 1916
- Died: Unknown
- Weight: 102 kg (225 lb)

Sport
- Sport: Athletics
- Event: Shot put
- Club: Vasco da Gama

Alcides Dambrós (born 12 May 1916 – date of death unknown) was a Brazilian athlete who specialised in the shot put. He won several medals for his country in the 1950s.

Relatively unsuccessful early in his career, he improved greatly around 1952 after changing his profession to a less physically straining one and modifying his technique. His personal best of 16.28 metres set in São Paulo in 1953 was a South American record at that time.

== International competitions ==
Year	Competition	Venue	Position	Event	Notes
Representing Brazil
1952	South American Championships	Buenos Aires, Argentina	7th	Shot put	13.23 m
1953	South American Championships (unofficial)	Santiago, Chile	1st	Shot put	15.08 m
1953	South American Championships (unofficial)	Santiago, Chile	6th	Discus throw	43.91 m
1954	South American Championships	São Paulo, Brazil	1st	Shot put	15.32 m
1954	South American Championships	São Paulo, Brazil	3rd	Discus throw	45.09 m
1956	South American Championships	Santiago, Chile	1st	Shot put	14.97 m
1958	South American Championships	Montevideo, Uruguay	4th	Shot put	14.60 m
1959	South American Championships (unofficial)	São Paulo, Brazil	4th	Shot put	14.14 m
1959	Pan American Games	Chicago, United States	12th	Shot put	44.05 m
1960	Ibero-American Games	Santiago, Chile	4th	Shot put	14.69 m
1960	Ibero-American Games	Santiago, Chile	12th (q)	Discus throw	41.44 m
