= Edmundo Ohaco =

Chilean hurdler (1926–1995)

Personal information
- Full name: Jean Edmond Ohaco Montier
- Nationality: Chilean
- Born: 12 July 1926
- Died: 12 October 1995 (aged 69)
- Height: 1.93 m (6 ft 4 in)
- Weight: 83 kg (183 lb)

Sport
- Sport: Track and field
- Event: 110 metres hurdles

Jean Edmond Ohaco Montier (12 July 1926 – 12 October 1995) was a Chilean hurdler. He competed in the men's 110 metres hurdles at the 1952 Summer Olympics.

== International competitions ==
Year	Competition	Venue	Position	Event	Notes
Representing Chile
1948	South American Championships (unofficial)	La Paz, Bolivia	2nd	110 m hurdles	15.3 s
1948	South American Championships (unofficial)	La Paz, Bolivia	2nd	Shot put	52.87 m
1949	South American Championships	Lima, Peru	8th	Decathlon	5827 pts
1952	Olympic Games	Helsinki, Finland	22nd (h)	110 m hurdles	15.61

== Personal bests ==
- 110 metres hurdles – 15.0h (1952)
