= Hércules Azcune =

Uruguayan sprinter (1924–2004)

Personal information
- Full name: Hércules Carlos Azcune
- Nationality: Uruguayan
- Born: 30 August 1924
- Died: 30 September 2004 (aged 80)

Sport
- Sport: Athletics
- Events: Decathlon, high jump

Hércules Carlos Azcune (30 August 1924 – 30 September 2004) was a Uruguayan sprinter. He competed in the men's 4 × 100 metres relay at the 1948 Summer Olympics.

== International competitions ==
Year	Competition	Venue	Position	Event	Notes
Representing Uruguay
1945	South American Championships	Montevideo, Uruguay	3rd	400 m hurdles	56.3 s
1945	South American Championships	Montevideo, Uruguay	1st	High jump	1.90 m
1946	South American Championships (unofficial)	Santiago, Chile	1st	400 m hurdles	54.0 s
1947	South American Championships	Rio de Janeiro, Brazil	4th	4 × 400 m relay	3:24.2
1948	Olympic Games	London, United Kingdom	10th (h)	4 × 100 m relay	42.8 s
1948	Olympic Games	London, United Kingdom	14th	High jump	1.80 m
1948	Olympic Games	London, United Kingdom	20th	Decathlon	6026 pts
1948	South American Championships (unofficial)	La Paz, Bolivia	1st	High jump	1.90 m
1948	South American Championships (unofficial)	La Paz, Bolivia	3rd	Long jump	6.71 m
1948	South American Championships (unofficial)	La Paz, Bolivia	1st	Discus throw	38.24 m
1949	South American Championships	Lima, Peru	5th	4 × 100 m relay	43.9 s
1949	South American Championships	Lima, Peru	1st	High jump	1.90 m
1949	South American Championships	Lima, Peru	2nd	Decathlon	6205 pts
1950	South American Championships (unofficial)	Montevideo, Uruguay	1st	High jump	1.95 m
1950	South American Championships (unofficial)	Montevideo, Uruguay	2nd	Decathlon	6383 pts
1952	South American Championships	Buenos Aires, Argentina	3rd	High jump	1.85 m
1952	Olympic Games	Helsinki, Finland	32nd (q)	High jump	1.80 m
1953	South American Championships (unofficial)	Santiago, Chile	3rd	Decathlon	5291 pts
1954	South American Championships	São Paulo, Brazil	5th	4 × 100 m relay	42.4 s
1954	South American Championships	São Paulo, Brazil	7th	High jump	1.80 m

== Personal bests ==
- 100 metres – 10.7h (1948)
- High jump – 1.95 metres (1950)
- Decathlon – 6033 pts (1950)
