= Carlos Vera (athlete) =

Chilean long jumper (1928–2022)

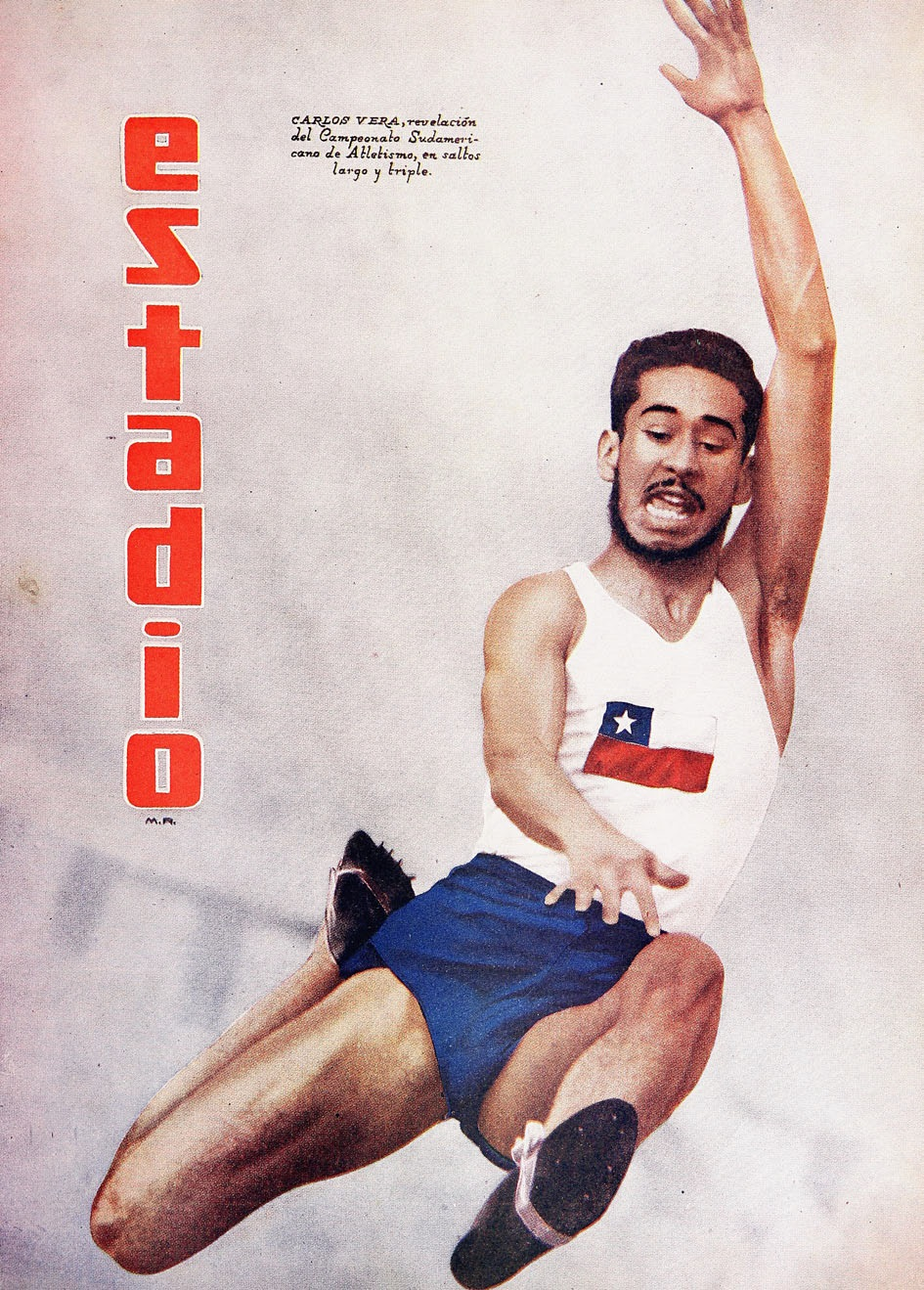

Personal information
- Full name: Carlos Sergio Vera Guardia
- Born: 30 August 1928 Iquique, Chile
- Died: 22 June 2022 (aged 93) Bloomington, Minnesota, U.S.
- Height: 1.78 m (5 ft 10 in)
- Weight: 65 kg (143 lb)

Sport
- Sport: Athletics
- Events: Long jump Triple jump

Carlos Sergio Vera Guardia (30 August 1928 – 22 June 2022) was a Chilean athlete. He competed at the 1948 Summer Olympics and the 1952 Summer Olympics. Vera died in Bloomington, Minnesota, on 22 June 2022 at the age of 93.

== International competitions ==
Year	Competition	Venue	Position	Event	Notes
Representing Chile
1947	South American Championships	Rio de Janeiro, Brazil	2nd	Triple jump	15.03 m
1948	Olympic Games	London, United Kingdom	23rd (q)	Triple jump	13.85 m
1948	South American Championships (unofficial)	La Paz, Bolivia	2nd	4 × 100 m relay	43.2 s
1948	South American Championships (unofficial)	La Paz, Bolivia	4th	High jump	1.80 m
1948	South American Championships (unofficial)	La Paz, Bolivia	3rd	Pole vault	3.60 m
1948	South American Championships (unofficial)	La Paz, Bolivia	1st	Long jump	7.05 m
1948	South American Championships (unofficial)	La Paz, Bolivia	1st	Triple jump	14.65 m
1949	South American Championships	Lima, Peru	5th	High jump	1.80 m
1949	South American Championships	Lima, Peru	?	Pole vault	3.60 m
1949	South American Championships	Lima, Peru	2nd	Long jump	7.11 m
1951	Pan American Games	Buenos Aires, Argentina	9th	Pole vault	3.50 m
1951	Pan American Games	Buenos Aires, Argentina	7th	Long jump	6.47 m
1952	South American Championships	Buenos Aires, Argentina	8th	High jump	1.75 m
1952	South American Championships	Buenos Aires, Argentina	2nd	Long jump	7.13 m
1952	South American Championships	Buenos Aires, Argentina	3rd	Decathlon	5844 pts
1952	Olympic Games	Helsinki, Finland	14th (q)	Long jump	7.07 m
1952	Olympic Games	Helsinki, Finland	–	Decathlon	DNF
1953	South American Championships (unofficial)	Santiago, Chile	4th	Pole vault	4.60 m
1953	South American Championships (unofficial)	Santiago, Chile	6th	Long jump	6.89 m
1953	South American Championships (unofficial)	Santiago, Chile	1st	Decathlon	5436 pts
1954	South American Championships	São Paulo, Brazil	9th	High jump	1.80 m
1954	South American Championships	São Paulo, Brazil	6th	Pole vault	3.60 m
1954	South American Championships	São Paulo, Brazil	4th	Long jump	7.18 m (w)
1954	South American Championships	São Paulo, Brazil	4th	Triple jump	14.37 m
1955	Pan American Games	Mexico City, Mexico	20th (h)	100 m	11.32 s
1955	Pan American Games	Mexico City, Mexico	4th	Long jump	7.49 m
1955	Pan American Games	Mexico City, Mexico	4th	Triple jump	15.30 m
1955	Pan American Games	Mexico City, Mexico	5th	Decathlon	4365 pts
1956	South American Championships	Santiago, Chile	6th	Long jump	6.79 m
1956	South American Championships	Santiago, Chile	3rd	Triple jump	14.63 m
1959	Pan American Games	Chicago, United States	8th	Long jump	6.87 m
1959	Pan American Games	Chicago, United States	11th	Triple jump	13.98 m
1960	Ibero-American Games	Santiago, Chile	11th (q)	Long jump	6.71 m
1960	Ibero-American Games	Santiago, Chile	7th	Triple jump	14.83 m
1961	South American Championships	Lima, Peru	4th	4 × 100 m relay	42.5 s
1961	South American Championships	Lima, Peru	4th	Triple jump	14.24 m
1962	Ibero-American Games	Madrid, Spain	(q)	Triple jump	?
1962	Ibero-American Games	Madrid, Spain	–	Decathlon	DNF

== Personal bests ==
- Long jump – 7.49 m (1955)
- Triple jump – 15.30 m (1955)
- Decathlon – 6111 (1953)
