= Athletics at the 1947–48 Bolivarian Games =

Athletics at the II Bolivarian Games
- Dates: December 26 - January 8
- Host city: Lima, Peru
- Level: Senior
- Events: 33 (23 men, 10 women)

Athletics competitions at the 1947–48 Bolivarian Games were held in Lima, Peru, in December 1947 and January 1948.

A detailed history of the early editions of the Bolivarian Games between 1938 and 1989 was published in a book written (in Spanish) by José Gamarra Zorrilla, former president of the Bolivian Olympic Committee, and first president (1976–1982) of ODESUR. Gold medal winners from Ecuador were published by the Comité Olímpico Ecuatoriano.

A total of 33 events were contested, 23 by men and 10 by women. Unusually, cross country events (individual and team) were part of the games.

== Medal summary ==
Medal winners were published.

=== Men ===
Event	Gold		Silver		Bronze	
100 metres	Lloyd LaBeach (PAN)	10.5	Santiago Ferrando (PER)	10.9	Miguel León (PER)	11.0
200 metres	Lloyd LaBeach (PAN)	21.0	Santiago Ferrando (PER)	22.0	Ricardo Rojas (PER)	22.7
400 metres	José Tovar (VEN)	49.5	Jaime Aparicio (COL)	49.9	Mario Rosas (COL)	50.4
800 metres	Antero Mongrut (PER)	1:54.9	Frank Prince (PAN)	1:56.5	Marcos Pujazón (PER)	1:58.7
1500 metres	Antero Mongrut (PER)	4:08.7	Marcos Pujazón (PER)	4:11.5	Rafael Zambrano (PER)	4:11.7
5000 metres	Adán Zárate (PER)	15:52.0	Leonidas Botiquín (PER)	16:11.0	Máximo Matos (PER)	16:18.4
10,000 metres	Adán Zárate (PER)	33:15.6	Carlos Fonseca (ECU)	33:59.0	Lino Ruelas (PER)	35:45.8
Half Marathon^{†}	Espiridión Villarcel (BOL)	1:09:21			Carlos Cruz (PER)	1:10:40
110 metres hurdles	Hernán Alzamora (PER)	15.4	Livio Montoya (PER)	16.4	Saul Arrechea (COL)	16.6
400 metres hurdles	Jaime Aparicio (COL)	55.9	Mario Rosas (COL)	56.7	Carlos Bahamonde (PER)	57.6
4 x 100 metres relay	Panama; Clayton Clarke; Clifford Loney; L. Welch; Lloyd LaBeach	41.6	Peru; Ramón Sánchez; Ricardo Rojas; Miguel León Pizzarro; Santiago Ferrando	42.4	Colombia; Aristipo Lerma; F. Restrepo; Miguel Ruiz; Rafael Cotes	43.4
4 x 400 metres relay	Panama; Clayton Clarke; Frank Prince; David Benskin; Sam LaBeach	3:20.4	Peru ? ? Santiago Ferrando; Antero Mongrut	3:22.8	Colombia ? ? Mario Rosas; Jaime Aparicio	3:27.7
High jump	Edmundo Masias (PER)	1.86	Miguel Clovis (PAN)	1.83	Edgar Audman (ECU)	1.83
Pole vault	Luis Ganoza (PER)	3.80	Jaime Piqueras (PER); Jorge Piqueras (PER)	3.40		
Long jump	Lloyd LaBeach (PAN)	6.99	Guillermo Dyer (PER)	6.75	Máximo Reyes (PER)	6.32
Triple jump	Guillermo Dyer (PER)	14.70	Máximo Reyes (PER)	14.32	Jorge Mendoza (PER)	13.36
Shot put	Leonelo Patiño (PER)	14.08	Eduardo Julve (PER)	13.68	Mauricio Rodríguez (VEN)	12.11
Discus throw	Eduardo Julve (PER)	44.54	Manuel Consiglieri (PER)	43.72	Héctor Mendoza (PER)	38.21
Hammer throw	Alberto Peirano (PER)	43.16	Manuel Consiglieri (PER)	42.38	Vicente Lagoyete (COL)	40.70
Javelin throw	José Romero (VEN)	53.24	Eduardo Julve (PER)	50.81	Guillermo Falkonert (COL)	50.09
Pentathlon	Eduardo Julve (PER)	3086	Máximo Reyes (PER)	2666	Mauricio Rodríguez (VEN)	2635
Cross Country - Individual	Francisco Montaño (BOL)	52:05	Espiridión Villarcel (BOL)	52:07	Luis Ruelas (PER)	53:31
Cross Country - Team						

==== Notes ====
^{†}: 20 kilometres ?

=== Women ===
Event	Gold		Silver		Bronze	
50 metres	Julia Sánchez (PER)	6.8	Julia Iriarte (BOL)	7.0	Carmen Soto (BOL)	7.2
100 metres	Julia Sánchez (PER)	13.3	Carmen Soto (BOL)	13.4	Laura Ortiz (BOL)	13.8
200 metres	Carmen Soto (BOL)	27.7	Julia Huapaya (PER)	28.8	Helena Amaya (PER)	28.9
80 metres hurdles	Julia Iriarte (BOL)	12.7	Carmen Soto (BOL)	15.5	Raquel Gamarra (PER)	15.5
4 x 100 metres relay	Peru; Isidora Aparicio; Raquel Gamarra; Julia Huapaya; Julia Sánchez	52.4	Bolivia ? Laura Ortiz; Carmen Soto; Julia Iriarte	52.5		
High jump	Julia Iriarte (BOL)	1.36	Carmen Soto (BOL)	1.36	Julia Sánchez (PER)	1.33
Long jump	Julia Iriarte (BOL)	5.01	Julia Sánchez (PER)	4.76	Carmela Antezana (BOL)	4.73
Shot put	Julia Iriarte (BOL)	10.77	Julia Huapaya (PER)	9.50	Elvira Casaverde (PER)	9.12
Discus throw	Julia Iriarte (BOL)	31.97	Julia Huapaya (PER)	31.29	Amelia Michilena (PER)	30.30
Javelin throw	Clorinda Herrera (PER)	30.81	Julia Iriarte (BOL)	29.58	Raquel Gamarra (PER)	21.55

== Medal table (unofficial) ==
* Host nation (Peru)

Rank	Nation	Gold	Silver	Bronze	Total
1	Peru (PER)*	16	21	17	54
2	Bolivia (BOL)	8	7	3	18
3	Panama (PAN)	5	2	0	7
4	Venezuela (VEN)	2	0	2	4
5	Colombia (COL)	1	2	5	8
6	Ecuador (ECU)	0	1	2	3
Totals (6 entries)		32	33	29	94
