= Hernán Alzamora =

Peruvian hurdler and decathlete

Personal information
- Full name: Julio Hernán Alzamora García
- Nationality: Peruvian
- Born: 12 April 1927
- Died: 19 February 2018 (aged 90) Lima, Peru
- Height: 183 cm (6 ft 0 in)
- Weight: 70 kg (154 lb)

Sport
- Sport: Track and field
- Events: 110 metres hurdles, decathlon

Julio Hernán Alzamora García (Note: In this Spanish name, the first or paternal surname is Alzamora and the second or maternal family name is García.) (12 April 1927 – 19 February 2018) was a Peruvian hurdler. He competed in the men's 110 metres hurdles at the 1948 Summer Olympics.

== International competitions ==
Year	Competition	Venue	Position	Event	Notes
Representing Peru
1947	Bolivarian Games	Lima, Peru	1st	110 m hurdles	15.4
1948	Olympic Games	London, United Kingdom	4th (h)	110 m hurdles	NT
1948	South American Championships (unofficial)	La Paz, Bolivia	1st	110 m hurdles	14.8
1948	South American Championships (unofficial)	La Paz, Bolivia	3rd	Javelin throw	44.75 m
1949	South American Championships	Lima, Peru	6th (h)	110 m hurdles	15.7
1949	South American Championships	Lima, Peru	6th	Decathlon	5848 pts
1951	Pan American Games	Buenos Aires, Argentina	6th (h)	110 m hurdles	15.1
1951	Pan American Games	Buenos Aires, Argentina	2nd	Decathlon	6063 pts
1951	Bolivarian Games	Caracas, Venezuela	2nd	110 m hurdles	15.5
1951	Bolivarian Games	Caracas, Venezuela	2nd	Decathlon	2742 pts
1952	South American Championships	Buenos Aires, Argentina	5th	110 m hurdles	15.3
1952	South American Championships	Buenos Aires, Argentina	2nd	Decathlon	5849 pts
1953	South American Championships (unofficial)	Santiago, Chile	6th (h)	110 m hurdles	15.5
1953	South American Championships (unofficial)	Santiago, Chile	6th	Decathlon	5011 pts
1954	South American Championships	São Paulo, Brazil	4th (h)	110 m hurdles	14.8 (w)
1954	South American Championships	São Paulo, Brazil	8th	Decathlon	5229 pts

== Personal bests ==
- 110 metres hurdles – 14.8h (1948)
