= Ivo Buratović =

Yugoslav long jumper

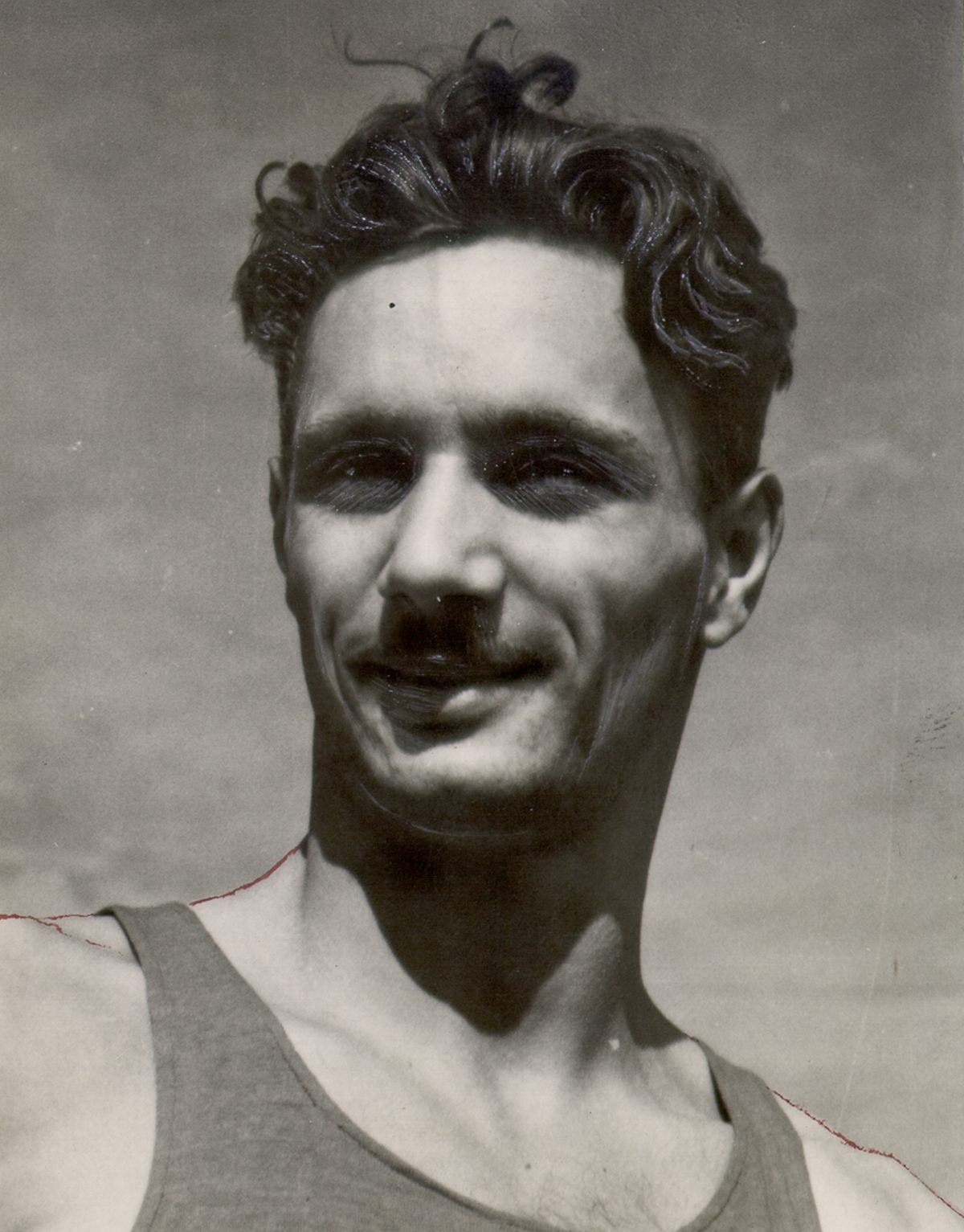
- Buratović in the 1930s

Personal information
- Nationality: Yugoslav
- Born: 3 March 1909 Račišće, Kingdom of Croatia-Slavonia
- Died: 11 March 1971 (aged 62) Johannesburg, South Africa
- Height: 1.89 m (6 ft 2 in)
- Weight: 75 kg (165 lb)

Sport
- Sport: Athletics
- Event: Long jump
- Club: HŠK Concordia

Ivo Buratović (3 March 1909 – 11 March 1971) was a Yugoslav athlete. He competed in the men's long jump at the 1936 Summer Olympics.

== International competitions ==
Year	Competition	Venue	Position	Event	Notes
Representing Yugoslavia
1934	European Championships	Turin, Italy	7th (sf)	110 m hurdles	15.1 s
1936	Olympic Games	Berlin, Germany	30th (q)	Long jump	Unknown
Representing Bolivia
1948	South American Championships (unofficial)	La Paz, Bolivia	3rd	110 m hurdles	15.4 s
1948	South American Championships (unofficial)	La Paz, Bolivia	4th	Pole vault	3.50 m
1948	South American Championships (unofficial)	La Paz, Bolivia	2nd	Shot put	11.40 m

== Personal bests ==
- Long jump – 7.18 (1933)
