= 1954 South American Championships in Athletics – Results =

These are the results of the 1954 South American Championships in Athletics which took place at the Estadio Municipal de Pacaembu in São Paulo, Brazil, between 17 and 25 April. Only the top 6 athletes have been reported for some finals.

== Men's results ==
=== 100 metres ===
Heats – 17 April
Wind: Heat 1: +7.0 m/s, Heat 2: +3.8 m/s, Heat 3: +3.8 m/s

Rank	Heat	Name	Nationality	Time	Notes
1	1	José Telles da Conceição	Brazil	10.5	Q
2	1	Hugo Krauss	Chile	10.8	Q
3	1	Wilfredo Sanguinetti	Peru	10.8	
4	1	Aristipo Lerma	Colombia	11.0	
1	2	Benedito Ferreira	Brazil	10.4	Q
2	2	Jaime Aparicio	Colombia	10.7	Q
3	2	Gerardo Salazar	Peru	10.7	
4	2	Amadiel Cortez	Chile	10.8	
5	2	Néstor Ibarra	Uruguay	11.2	
1	3	Paulo da Fonseca	Brazil	10.4	Q
2	3	Máximo Reyes	Peru	10.9	Q
3	3	Patricio Letelier	Chile	10.9	
4	3	José Ravell	Uruguay	NT	

Final – 18 April
Wind: +1.9 m/s

Rank	Name	Nationality	Time	Notes
1st place, gold medalist(s)	Paulo da Fonseca	Brazil	10.6	
2nd place, silver medalist(s)	José Telles da Conceição	Brazil	10.7	
3rd place, bronze medalist(s)	Benedito Ferreira	Brazil	10.7	
4	Jaime Aparicio	Colombia	10.7	
5	Hugo Krauss	Chile	11.0	
6	Máximo Reyes	Peru	11.0	

=== 200 metres ===
Heats – 20 April

Rank	Heat	Name	Nationality	Time	Notes
1	1	Benedito Ferreira	Brazil	21.9	Q
2	1	Apolinar Solórzano	Venezuela	22.2	Q
3	1	Jaime Aparicio	Colombia	22.3	Q
4	1	Gustavo Ehlers	Chile	22.4	Q
5	1	Wilfredo Sanguinetti	Peru	22.7	
1	2	Paulo da Fonseca	Brazil	21.9	Q
2	2	Hugo Krauss	Chile	22.1	Q
3	2	Guillermo Gutiérrez	Venezuela	22.3	Q
4	2	José Ravell	Uruguay	22.6	Q
5	2	Óscar Maldonado	Peru	22.7	
1	3	José Telles da Conceição	Brazil	21.5	Q
2	3	Amadiel Cortez	Chile	22.6	Q
3	3	Juan Leiva	Venezuela	22.6	Q
4	3	Guillermo Sebastiani	Peru	22.6	Q
5	3	Néstor Ibarra	Uruguay	22.9	
6	3	Aristipo Lerma	Colombia	23.7	

Semifinals – 20 April

Rank	Heat	Name	Nationality	Time	Notes
1	1	José Telles da Conceição	Brazil	21.4	Q
2	1	Benedito Ferreira	Brazil	21.9	Q
3	1	Apolinar Solórzano	Venezuela	22.0	Q
4	1	José Ravell	Uruguay	22.5	
5	1	Juan Leiva	Venezuela	22.7	
6	1	Gustavo Ehlers	Chile	23.6	
1	2	Paulo da Fonseca	Brazil	21.5	Q
2	2	Jaime Aparicio	Colombia	22.0	Q
3	2	Hugo Krauss	Chile	22.1	Q
4	2	Amadiel Cortez	Chile	22.2	
5	2	Guillermo Sebastiani	Peru	22.3	
6	2	Guillermo Gutiérrez	Venezuela	22.4	

Final – 21 April

Rank	Name	Nationality	Time	Notes
1st place, gold medalist(s)	José Telles da Conceição	Brazil	21.2	AR
2nd place, silver medalist(s)	Jaime Aparicio	Colombia	21.7	
3rd place, bronze medalist(s)	Paulo da Fonseca	Brazil	21.8	
4	Benedito Ferreira	Brazil	21.8	
5	Apolinar Solórzano	Venezuela	21.9	
6	Hugo Krauss	Chile	22.3	

=== 400 metres ===
Heats – 17 April

Rank	Heat	Name	Nationality	Time	Notes
1	1	Mário do Nascimento	Brazil	49.8	Q
2	1	Segundo Peña	Chile	50.5	Q
3	1	Juan López	Peru	50.9	
1	2	Argemiro Roque	Brazil	50.5	Q
2	2	Gustavo Ehlers	Chile	50.9	Q
3	2	Rogerio Gómez	Peru	51.6	
4	2	Emir Miller	Uruguay	53.0	
1	3	Ramón Sandoval	Chile	49.9	Q
2	3	Ulisses dos Santos	Brazil	50.4	Q
3	3	Óscar Nietzel	Uruguay	51.4	
4	3	Felipe Chará	Colombia	52.6	

Final – 18 April

Rank	Name	Nationality	Time	Notes
1st place, gold medalist(s)	Mário do Nascimento	Brazil	48.3	AR
2nd place, silver medalist(s)	Argemiro Roque	Brazil	49.1	
3rd place, bronze medalist(s)	Ramón Sandoval	Chile	49.5	
4	Gustavo Ehlers	Chile	49.7	
5	Segundo Peña	Chile	50.0	
6	Ulisses dos Santos	Brazil	50.5	

=== 800 metres ===
21 April

Rank	Name	Nationality	Time	Notes
1st place, gold medalist(s)	Ramón Sandoval	Chile	1:50.9	CR, NR
2nd place, silver medalist(s)	Argemiro Roque	Brazil	1:53.6	
3rd place, bronze medalist(s)	Odilon Dias Netto	Brazil	1:54.2	
4	Waldo Sandoval	Chile	1:55.4	
5	Orlando Arévalo	Uruguay	1:56.0	NR
6	Juan López	Peru	1:56.4	

=== 1500 metres ===
18 April

Rank	Name	Nationality	Time	Notes
1st place, gold medalist(s)	Jaime Correa	Chile	3:56.5	CR
2nd place, silver medalist(s)	Guillermo Solá	Chile	3:57.2	
3rd place, bronze medalist(s)	Santiago Novas	Chile	3:57.7	
4	Antônio Roque	Brazil	3:58.4	NR
5	Edgard Mitt	Brazil	4:04.2	
6	Benedito de Paula	Brazil	4:04.5	

=== 5000 metres ===
17 April

Rank	Name	Nationality	Time	Notes
1st place, gold medalist(s)	Jaime Correa	Chile	15:00.6	
2nd place, silver medalist(s)	Santiago Novas	Chile	15:07.8	
3rd place, bronze medalist(s)	Edgard Mitt	Brazil	15:14.1	
4	Luis Campusano	Chile	15:33.5	
5	Luís Rodrigues	Brazil	15:38.4	
6	Edgar Freire	Brazil	15:39.4	
	Viterbo Rivero	Uruguay	DNF	

=== 10,000 metres ===
21 April

Rank	Name	Nationality	Time	Notes
1st place, gold medalist(s)	Jaime Correa	Chile	31:41.0	
2nd place, silver medalist(s)	Geraldo Alves	Brazil	32:14.5	
3rd place, bronze medalist(s)	Luís Rodrigues	Brazil	32:20.5	
4	Nelson Abreu	Brazil	32:38.3	
5	Alfonso Cornejo	Chile	33:08.4	
6	José Emiliano Fonseca	Chile	33:27.2	
	Segundo Torres	Peru	NT	
	Marcelino Serrano	Venezuela	NT	
	Gustavo Ramírez	Colombia	NT	
	Julio Chavarría	Colombia	NT	

=== Half marathon ===
25 April

Rank	Name	Nationality	Time	Notes
1st place, gold medalist(s)	Geraldo Alves	Brazil	1:13:02	
2nd place, silver medalist(s)	Joaquim da Silva	Brazil	1:13:43	
3rd place, bronze medalist(s)	José Eliáas Pérez	Chile	1:15:48	
4	José Emiliano Fonseca	Chile	1:18:03	
5	Segundo Torres	Peru	1:19:07	
6	Geraldo Felipe	Brazil	1:19:18	
7	Gustavo Ramírez	Colombia	NT	
8	Enrique Tapia	Chile	NT	
9	Julio Chavarría	Colombia	NT	
	Juan Guau	Uruguay	DNF	
	Marcelino Serrano	Venezuela	DNF	

=== 110 metres hurdles ===
Heats – 18 April
Wind: Heat 1: +2.5 m/s, Heat 2: +2.5 m/s

Rank	Heat	Name	Nationality	Time	Notes
1	1	Teófilo Davis Bell	Venezuela	14.9	Q
2	1	Carlos Claro	Chile	15.2	Q
3	1	Hernán Alzamora	Peru	15.2	Q
4	1	Ijoel da Silva	Brazil	15.4	
5	1	Andrés Jeanerett	Chile	15.8	
1	2	Wilson Carneiro	Brazil	14.9	Q
2	2	Juan Leiva	Venezuela	15.1	Q
3	2	Aldo Ribeiro	Brazil	15.2	Q
4	2	Carlos Ávila	Colombia	15.5	
5	2	Ariel Standen	Chile	15.5	
6	2	Luis Huarcaya	Peru	15.7	

Final – 20 April
Wind: +4.2 m/s

Rank	Name	Nationality	Time	Notes
1st place, gold medalist(s)	Wilson Carneiro	Brazil	14.3	
2nd place, silver medalist(s)	Teófilo Davis Bell	Venezuela	14.5	
3rd place, bronze medalist(s)	Juan Leiva	Venezuela	14.8	
4	Hernán Alzamora	Peru	14.8	
5	Aldo Ribeiro	Brazil	15.5	
6	Carlos Claro	Chile	17.5	

=== 400 metres hurdles ===
Heats – 21 April

Rank	Heat	Name	Nationality	Time	Notes
1	1	Wilson Carneiro	Brazil	55.0	Q
2	1	Pablo Eitel	Chile	55.7	Q
3	1	Erwino Stobaus	Brazil	55.7	Q
4	1	Felipe Chará	Colombia	57.6	
5	1	Óscar Nietzel	Uruguay	57.6	
1	2	Ulisses dos Santos	Brazil	55.5	Q
2	2	Jaime Aparicio	Colombia	55.6	Q
3	2	Emir Miller	Uruguay	55.8	Q
4	2	Alfonso Rozas	Chile	56.5	

Final – 24 April

Rank	Name	Nationality	Time	Notes
1st place, gold medalist(s)	Jaime Aparicio	Colombia	52.2	CR
2nd place, silver medalist(s)	Wilson Carneiro	Brazil	53.5	
3rd place, bronze medalist(s)	Ulisses dos Santos	Brazil	54.9	
4	Erwino Stobaus	Brazil	55.5	
5	Pablo Eitel	Chile	55.9	
6	Emir Miller	Uruguay	57.8	

=== 3000 metres steeplechase ===
24 April

Rank	Name	Nationality	Time	Notes
1st place, gold medalist(s)	Edgar Mitt	Brazil	9:14.9	AR
2nd place, silver medalist(s)	Guillermo Solá	Chile	9:16.0	NR
3rd place, bronze medalist(s)	Santiago Novas	Chile	9:26.6	
4	Haroldo Gallardo	Chile	9:39.6	
5	Edgar Freire	Brazil	9:49.1	
6	Rómulo Gomes	Brazil	9:51.3	
7	Viterbo Rivero	Uruguay	NT	
8	Orlando Arévalo	Uruguay	NT	

=== 4 × 100 metres relay ===
24 April

Rank	Nation	Competitors	Time	Notes
1st place, gold medalist(s)	Brazil	Francisco Kadlec, Benedito Ferreira, Paulo da Fonseca, José Telles da Conceição	40.8	CR, NR
2nd place, silver medalist(s)	Peru	Gerardo Salazar, Máximo Reyes, Óscar Maldonado, Guillermo Sebastiani	41.8	NR
3rd place, bronze medalist(s)	Venezuela	Apolinar Solórzano, Guillermo Gutiérrez, Juan Leiva, Teófilo Davis Bell	42.2	
4	Chile	Hugo Moya, Patricio Letelier, Amadiel Cortez, Hugo Krauss	42.3	
5	Uruguay	Fermín Donazar, Néstor Ibarra, Hércules Azcune, José Ravell	42.4	

=== 4 × 400 metres relay ===
25 April

Rank	Nation	Competitors	Time	Notes
1st place, gold medalist(s)	Brazil	Argemiro Roque, Ulisses dos Santos, Armando da Silva, Mário do Nascimento	3:15.6	CR
2nd place, silver medalist(s)	Chile	Segundo Peña, Waldo Sandoval, Gustavo Ehlers, Ramón Sandoval	3:16.9	NR
3rd place, bronze medalist(s)	Venezuela	Guillermo Gutiérrez, Apolinar Solórzano, Filemón Camacho, Juan Leiva	3:21.0	
4	Peru	Óscar Maldonado, Santiago Ferrando, Juan López, Rogerio Gómez	3:26.6	
5	Uruguay	Néstor Ibarra, José Ravell, Orlando Arévalo, Emir Miller	3:28.1	

=== High jump ===
17 April

Rank	Name	Nationality	1.80	1.85	1.90	1.95	2.00	2.02	Result	Notes
1st place, gold medalist(s)	José Telles da Conceição	Brazil	o	o	o	o	xo	xxx	2.00	AR
2nd place, silver medalist(s)	Ernesto Lagos	Chile	o	o	o	xo	xxx		1.95	
3rd place, bronze medalist(s)	Adilton Luz	Brazil							1.90	
4	Carlos Puebla	Chile							1.85	
5	Hajime Nakajima	Brazil							1.85	
6	Luis Huarcaya	Peru							1.85	
7	Hércules Azcune	Uruguay							1.80	
8	Cecil Dalmage	Peru							1.80	
9	Carlos Vera	Chile							1.80	

=== Pole vault ===
20 April

Rank	Name	Nationality	3.20	3.40	3.50	3.60	3.70	3.80	3.90	4.00	Result	Notes
1st place, gold medalist(s)	Brígido Iriarte	Venezuela	–	–	–	o	o	o	o	xxx	3.90	
2nd place, silver medalist(s)	Carlos Moschen	Brazil	–	–	–	xxo					3.90	
3rd place, bronze medalist(s)	Fausto de Souza	Brazil									3.90	
4	Hélcio da Silva	Brazil									3.80	
5	Ricardo Pigni	Uruguay									3.70	
6	Carlos Vera	Chile									3.60	
7	Carlos Puebla	Chile									3.50	
	Gonzalo Rojas	Chile	–	o							NM	
	Hugo García	Peru	xxx								NM	

=== Long jump ===
18 April

Rank	Name	Nationality	Result	Notes
1st place, gold medalist(s)	Fermín Donazar	Uruguay	7.51w	
2nd place, silver medalist(s)	Mário Gonzales	Brazil	7.47w	
3rd place, bronze medalist(s)	Ary de Sá	Brazil	7.19	
4	Carlos Vera	Chile	7.18w	
5	Wladimiro Leighton	Chile	7.11w	
6	Jorge Mendoza	Peru	6.86	
7	Ariel Standen	Chile	6.53	

=== Triple jump ===
21 April

Rank	Name	Nationality	Result	Notes
1st place, gold medalist(s)	Adhemar da Silva	Brazil	16.22	=AR
2nd place, silver medalist(s)	Hélio da Silva	Brazil	14.86	
3rd place, bronze medalist(s)	Renato do Nascimento	Brazil	14.70	
4	Carlos Vera	Chile	14.37	
5	Wladimiro Leighton	Chile	14.04	
6	Jorge Mendoza	Peru	13.84	
7	Luis Huarcaya	Peru	13.77	
8	Fermín Donazar	Uruguay	13.64	

=== Shot put ===
18 April

Rank	Name	Nationality	Result	Notes
1st place, gold medalist(s)	Alcides Dambrós	Brazil	15.32	CR
2nd place, silver medalist(s)	Nadim Marreis	Brazil	13.81	
3rd place, bronze medalist(s)	Armin Neverman	Chile	13.79	
4	Leonardo Patiño	Peru	13.75	
5	Leonardo Kittsteiner	Chile	13.45	
6	Armando Faustini	Brazil	13.27	
7	Hernán Figueroa	Chile	12.66	
8	Alfonso Rodríguez	Colombia	11.26	

=== Discus throw ===
24 April

Rank	Name	Nationality	Result	Notes
1st place, gold medalist(s)	Eduardo Julve	Peru	47.44	
2nd place, silver medalist(s)	Hernán Haddad	Chile	46.52	
3rd place, bronze medalist(s)	Alcides Dambrós	Brazil	45.09	
4	Héctor Menacho	Peru	43.95	
5	Nadim Marreis	Brazil	42.00	
6	Mauricio Rodríguez	Venezuela	41.63	
7	Gabriel Mueller	Brazil	41.46	
8	Walter Yager	Chile	39.94	
9	Armin Neverman	Chile	39.56	

=== Hammer throw ===
20 April

Rank	Name	Nationality	Result	Notes
1st place, gold medalist(s)	Walter Kupper	Brazil	50.65	
2nd place, silver medalist(s)	Alejandro Díaz	Chile	50.04	
3rd place, bronze medalist(s)	Arturo Melcher	Chile	49.47	
4	Walter Rodrigues	Brazil	48.93	
5	Bruno Strohmeyer	Brazil	46.04	
6	Manuel Consiglieri	Peru	44.96	
7	Antono Vodanovic	Chile	44.59	
8	Enrique Lagoyette	Colombia	39.39	

=== Javelin throw ===
17 April – old model

Rank	Name	Nationality	Result	Notes
1st place, gold medalist(s)	Carlos Monge	Peru	61.33	NR
2nd place, silver medalist(s)	Janis Stendzeniecks	Chile	60.88	
3rd place, bronze medalist(s)	Francisco Céspedes	Chile	56.81	
4	Orlando Couto	Brazil	55.09	
5	Hans Illman	Peru	54.47	
6	Armin Neverman	Chile	53.74	
7	Osmar Duque	Brazil	52.66	
8	Rafael Gulfo	Colombia	52.03	
9	Antonio dos Anjos	Brazil	51.89	

=== Decathlon ===
24–25 April – 1952 tables (1985 conversions given with *)

The highest mark recorded in each event is highlighted in yellow

Rank	Athlete	Nationality	100m	LJ	SP	HJ	400m	110m H	DT	PV	JT	1500m	Points	Conv.	Notes
1st place, gold medalist(s)	Francisco Moura	Brazil	10.9	7.05	11.15	1.80	51.8	16.1	36.12	2.90	50.91	4:45.8	6049	6425*	
2nd place, silver medalist(s)	Brígido Iriarte	Venezuela	11.3	6.80	11.98	1.63	53.4	16.5	39.30	4.00	50.44	4:54.6	6002	6368*	NR
3rd place, bronze medalist(s)	Aldo Ribeiro	Brazil	11.3	6.58	11.03	1.73	51.7	15.6	33.99	3.20	49.35	4:50.8	5767	6205*	
4	Hernán Figueroa	Chile	11.5	6.43	12.99	1.76	53.7	16.5	35.70	3.50	50.43	5:08.5	5630	6110*	
5	Héctor Menacho	Peru	11.2	6.39	11.98	1.67	50.5	16.2	39.55	3.00	34.78	4:50.3	5559	6028*	
6	Luís Fernandes	Brazil	11.4	6.41	10.31	1.63	51.2	16.1	32.28	3.10	44.58	4:23.0	5551	6031*	
7	Raúl Osorio	Chile	11.4	6.55	10.40	1.60	50.0	17.4	26.46	3.40	49.63	4:23.0	5520	5999*	
8	Hernán Alzamora	Peru	11.3	6.41	10.58	1.73	52.9	15.0	30.34	3.20	46.52	5:22.8	5229	5769*	
9	Manuel Gómez	Venezuela	11.4	6.77	10.12	1.85	56.7	18.8	33.00	3.30	47.72	?	3526	–	
	Leonardo Kittsteiner	Chile	11.8	5.98	12.53	1.55	53.3	18.0	32.07	?	DNS	–	DNF	–	

== Women's results ==
=== 100 metres ===
Heats – 17 April
Wind: Heat 1: +4.0 m/s, Heat 2: +3.0 m/s

Rank	Heat	Name	Nationality	Time	Notes
1	1	Benedicta de Oliveira	Brazil	12.3	Q
2	1	Betty Kretschmer	Chile	12.5	Q
3	1	Alejandrina Correa	Colombia	12.6	Q
4	1	Delia Díaz	Uruguay	13.6	
1	2	Elda Selamé	Chile	12.3	Q
2	2	Deyse de Castro	Brazil	12.4	Q
3	2	Aurora Bianchi	Chile	12.5	Q
4	2	Melânia Luz	Brazil	12.5	
	2	Beatriz Daher	Uruguay	DQ	

Final – 18 April
Wind: +2.7 m/s

Rank	Lane	Name	Nationality	Time	Notes
1st place, gold medalist(s)	3	Benedicta de Oliveira	Brazil	12.3	
2nd place, silver medalist(s)	2	Deyse de Castro	Brazil	12.3	
3rd place, bronze medalist(s)	1	Elda Selamé	Chile	12.3	
4	4	Aurora Bianchi	Chile	12.5	
5	5	Betty Kretschmer	Chile	12.5	
6	6	Alejandrina Correa	Colombia	12.8	

=== 200 metres ===
Heats – 20 April

Rank	Heat	Name	Nationality	Time	Notes
1	1	Deyse de Castro	Brazil	25.8	Q
2	1	Melânia Luz	Brazil	26.7	Q
3	1	Aurora Bianchi	Chile	26.9	Q
4	1	Teresa Venegas	Chile	28.3	
1	2	Elda Selamé	Chile	25.8	Q
2	2	Benedicta de Oliveira	Brazil	25.8	Q
3	2	Alejandrina Correa	Colombia	26.9	Q
4	2	Beatriz Daher	Uruguay	27.2	

Final – 21 April

Rank	Name	Nationality	Time	Notes
1st place, gold medalist(s)	Deyse de Castro	Brazil	25.7	
2nd place, silver medalist(s)	Elda Selamé	Chile	25.8	
3rd place, bronze medalist(s)	Benedicta de Oliveira	Brazil	26.2	
4	Melânia Luz	Brazil	26.5	
5	Aurora Bianchi	Chile	26.7	
6	Alejandrina Correa	Colombia	27.1	

=== 80 metres hurdles ===
Heats – 24 April

Rank	Heat	Name	Nationality	Time	Notes
1	1	Wanda dos Santos	Brazil	11.7	Q
2	1	Delia Díaz	Uruguay	11.7	Q
3	1	Betty Kretschmer	Chile	12.2	Q
4	1	Maria José de Lima	Brazil	12.3	
1	2	Eliana Gaete	Chile	11.9	Q
2	2	Margot Ritter	Brazil	12.4	Q
3	2	Norma Beckmann	Chile	12.4	Q

Final – 25 April

Rank	Name	Nationality	Time	Notes
1st place, gold medalist(s)	Wanda dos Santos	Brazil	11.4	CR
2nd place, silver medalist(s)	Eliana Gaete	Chile	11.9	
3rd place, bronze medalist(s)	Delia Díaz	Uruguay	12.2	NR
4	Betty Kretschmer	Chile	12.3	
5	Norma Beckmann	Chile	12.5	
6	Margot Ritter	Brazil	12.7	

=== 4 × 100 metres relay ===
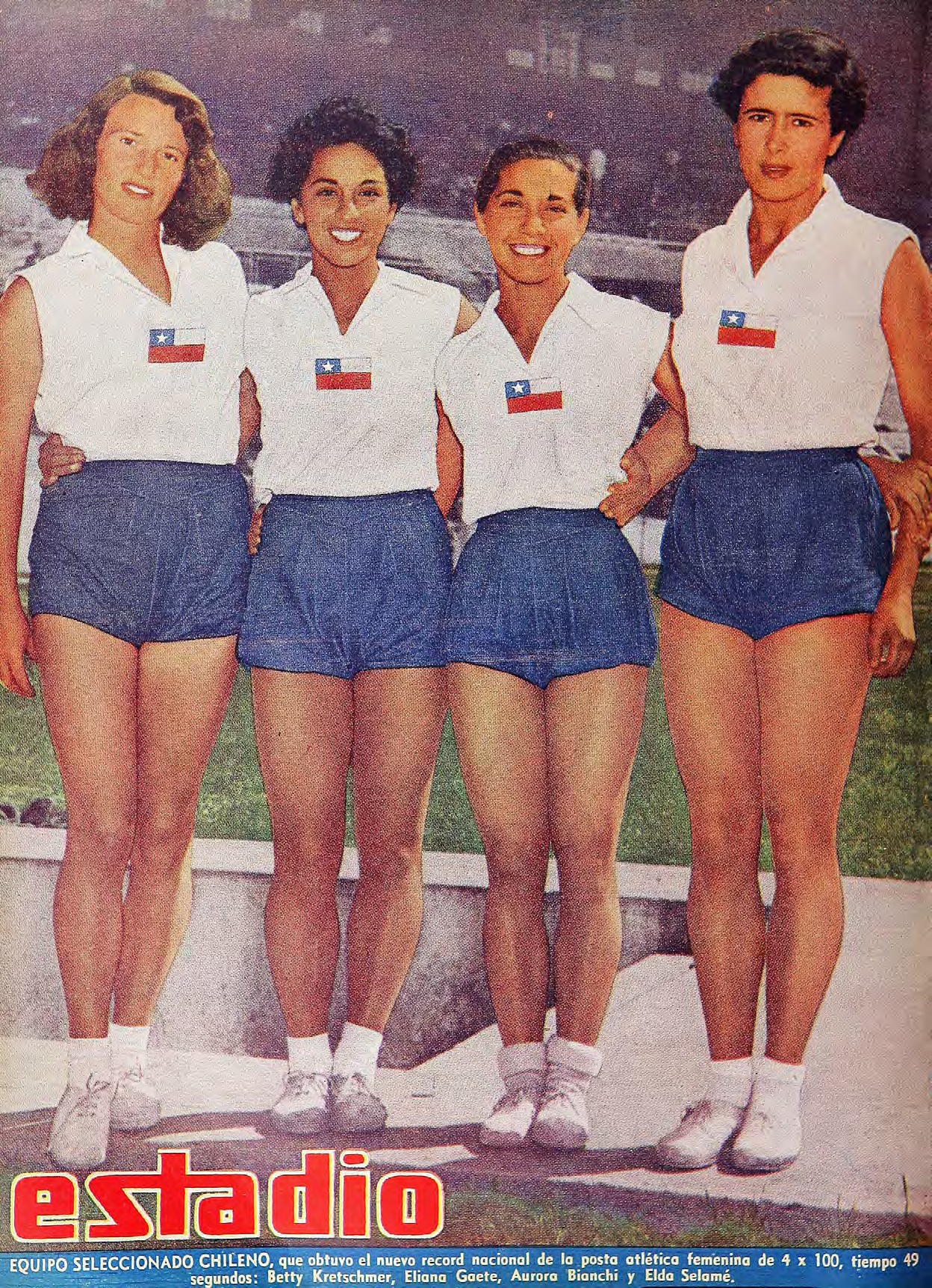
The winning Chilean team after the event

25 April

Rank	Nation	Competitors	Time	Notes
1st place, gold medalist(s)	Chile	Aurora Bianchi, Elda Selamé, Eliana Gaete, Betty Kretschmer	48.4	CR, NR
2nd place, silver medalist(s)	Brazil	Deyse de Castro, Elizabeth Müller, Melânia Luz, Benedita de Oliveira	48.6	

=== High jump ===
24 April

Rank	Name	Nationality	Result	Notes
1st place, gold medalist(s)	Delia Díaz	Uruguay	1.55	NR
2nd place, silver medalist(s)	Elisabeth Muller	Brazil	1.55	
3rd place, bronze medalist(s)	Deyse de Castro	Brazil	1.55	
4	Margot Ritter	Brazil	1.45	
5	María Ramos	Chile	1.45	
6	Adriana Millard	Chile	1.40	

=== Long jump ===
18 April

Rank	Name	Nationality	Result	Notes
1st place, gold medalist(s)	Lisa Peters	Chile	5.75	CR, NR
2nd place, silver medalist(s)	Deyse de Castro	Brazil	5.47	
3rd place, bronze medalist(s)	Wanda dos Santos	Brazil	5.42	
4	Beatriz Daher	Uruguay	5.38	NR
5	Adriana Millard	Chile	5.28	
6	Betty Kretschmer	Chile	5.12	
7	Eliete Zanardo	Brazil	4.87	

=== Shot put ===
21 April

Rank	Name	Nationality	Result	Notes
1st place, gold medalist(s)	Elizabeth Müller	Brazil	11.79	
2nd place, silver medalist(s)	Pradelia Delgado	Chile	11.70	
3rd place, bronze medalist(s)	Vera Trezoitko	Brazil	11.60	
4	Marlene Ahrens	Chile	11.46	
5	Julia Huapaya	Peru	11.32	
6	Christina Brugger	Brazil	10.93	

=== Discus throw ===
21 April

Rank	Name	Nationality	Result	Notes
1st place, gold medalist(s)	Erica Trömmel	Chile	39.84	NR
2nd place, silver medalist(s)	Ilse Gerdau	Brazil	39.40	
3rd place, bronze medalist(s)	Pradelia Delgado	Chile	39.40	
4	Vera Trezoitko	Brazil	37.23	
5	Rosa Riveros	Chile	34.80	
6	Noemia Assumpcão	Brazil	33.12	
7	Julia Huapaya	Peru	28.43	

=== Javelin throw ===
25 April – old model

Rank	Name	Nationality	Result	Notes
1st place, gold medalist(s)	Anneliese Schmidt	Brazil	42.07	CR, NR
2nd place, silver medalist(s)	Marlene Ahrens	Chile	41.68	NR
3rd place, bronze medalist(s)	Carmen Venegas	Chile	41.65	
4	Adriana Silva	Chile	36.83	
5	Ilse Gerdau	Brazil	35.15	
6	Vera Trezoitko	Brazil	33.11	
