= Edith Thomas (athlete) =

Chilean javelin thrower (1927–2013)

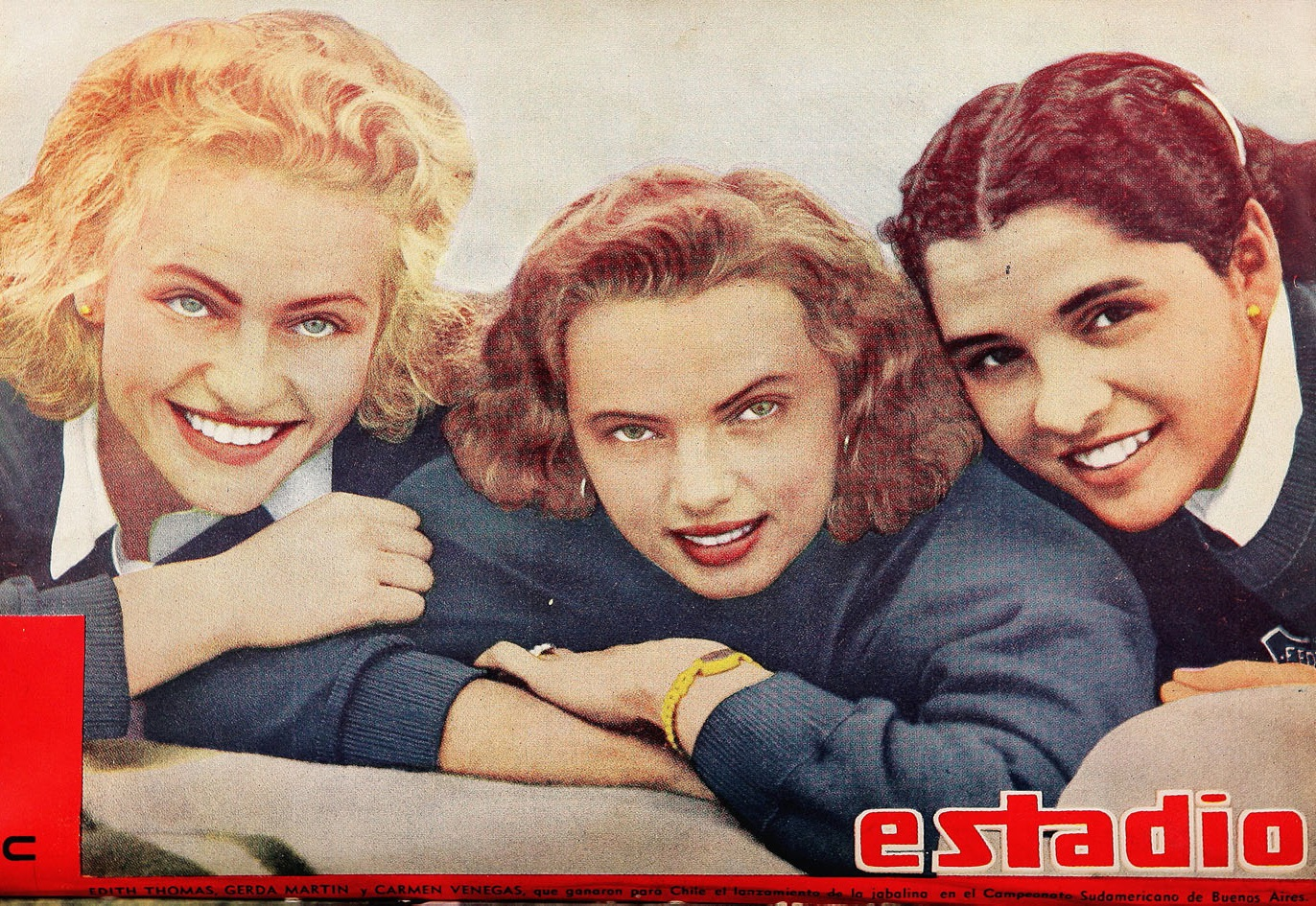
- Edith Thomas, Gerda Martín and Carmen Venegas.

Personal information
- Full name: Edith Olga Thomas Kusch
- Nationality: Chilean
- Born: 15 May 1927
- Died: 9 June 2013 (aged 86)

Sport
- Sport: Athletics
- Event: Javelin throw

Edith Olga Thomas Kusch (15 May 1927 – 9 June 2013) was a Chilean athlete. She competed in the women's javelin throw at the 1952 Summer Olympics.

== International competitions ==
Year	Competition	Venue	Position	Event	Notes
Representing Chile
1952	South American Championships	Buenos Aires, Argentina	10th	Discus throw	28.72 m
1952	South American Championships	Buenos Aires, Argentina	2nd	Javelin throw	38.80 m
1952	Olympic Games	Helsinki, Finland	– (q)	Javelin throw	NM

== Personal bests ==
- Javelin throw – 38.80 (1952)
