= Jaime Piqueras =

Peruvian pole vaulter

Personal information
- Full name: Jaime Antonio Piqueras Sánchez Concha
- Born: 8 January 1927 (age 99) Lima, Peru

Sport
- Sport: Athletics
- Event: Pole vault

Jaime Antonio Piqueras Sánchez Concha (born 8 January 1927) is a Peruvian retired athlete. He competed in the men's pole vault at the 1948 Summer Olympics.

His personal best in the event was 4.04 metres set in 1951.

== International competitions ==
| Year | Competition | Venue | Position | Notes |
Representing Peru
| 1947 | South American Championships | Rio de Janeiro, Brazil | 7th | 3.40 m |
| 1947 | Bolivarian Games | Lima, Peru | 2nd | 3.40 m |
| 1948 | Olympic Games | London, United Kingdom | 17th (q) | 3.60 m |
| 1948 | South American Championships (unofficial) | La Paz, Bolivia | 2nd | 3.70 m |
| 1949 | South American Championships | Lima, Peru | 5th | 3.80 m |
| 1951 | Pan American Games | Buenos Aires, Argentina | 1st | 3.75 m |
| 1951 | Bolivarian Games | Caracas, Venezuela | 2nd | 3.75 m |
| 1952 | South American Championships | Buenos Aires, Argentina | 2nd | 3.90 m |
