= Luis Ganoza =

Peruvian pole vaulter (1921–2001)

Personal information
- Full name: Luis Antonio Ganoza Ríos
- Nationality: Peruvian
- Born: 6 February 1921 Salaverry, Peru
- Died: 17 May 2001 (aged 80) Trujillo, Peru
- Height: 1.73 m (5 ft 8 in)

Sport
- Sport: Athletics
- Event: Pole vault

Luis Antonio Ganoza Ríos (6 February 1921 – 17 May 2001) was a Peruvian athlete. He competed in the men's pole vault at the 1948 Summer Olympics.

His personal best in the event was 3.95 metres set in 1949.

== International competitions ==
Year	Competition	Venue	Position	Event	Notes
Representing Peru
1947	Bolivarian Games	Lima, Peru	1st	Pole vault	3.80 m
1948	Olympic Games	London, United Kingdom	16th (q)	Pole vault	3.70 m
1948	South American Championships (unofficial)	La Paz, Bolivia	1st	Pole vault	3.70 m
1949	South American Championships	Lima, Peru	2nd	Pole vault	3.90 m
1951	Pan American Games	Buenos Aires, Argentina	8th	Pole vault	3.50 m
1951	Bolivarian Games	Caracas, Venezuela	2nd	Pole vault	3.75 m
1952	South American Championships	Buenos Aires, Argentina	3rd	Pole vault	3.90 m
1953	South American Championships (unofficial)	Santiago, Chile	3rd	Pole vault	3.60 m
