= Antero Mongrut =

Peruvian middle-distance runner (born 1925)

Personal information
- Full name: Antero Alejandro Mongrut Muñoz
- Born: 24 April 1925 Chepen, Peru

Sport
- Sport: Middle-distance running
- Event: 800 metres

Antero Alejandro Mongrut Muñoz (born 24 April 1925) was a Peruvian middle-distance runner. He competed in the men's 800 metres at the 1948 Summer Olympics.

== International competitions ==
Year	Competition	Venue	Position	Event	Notes
Representing Peru
1947	South American Championships	Rio de Janeiro, Brazil	?	800 m	NT
1947	South American Championships	Rio de Janeiro, Brazil	5th	4 × 400 m relay	NT
1947	Bolivarian Games	Lima, Peru	1st	800 m	1:54.9
1947	Bolivarian Games	Lima, Peru	1st	1500 m	4:08.7
1947	Bolivarian Games	Lima, Peru	2nd	4 × 400 m relay	3:22.8
1948	Olympic Games	London, United Kingdom	33rd (h)	800 m	1:58.7
1948	Olympic Games	London, United Kingdom	10th (h)	1500 m	NT
1948	South American Championships (unofficial)	La Paz, Bolivia	6th	400 m	52.0
1948	South American Championships (unofficial)	La Paz, Bolivia	1st	800 m	2:04.3
1949	South American Championships	Lima, Peru	6th	800 m	1:59.0
1949	South American Championships	Lima, Peru	?	1500 m	NT
1949	South American Championships	Lima, Peru	4th	4 × 400 m relay	3:26.5

== Personal bests ==
- 800 metres – 1:54.9h (1948)
- 1500 metres – 4:08.7h (1947)
