= Athletics at the 1951 Pan American Games – Men's decathlon =

Men's decathlon at the Pan American Games

The men's decathlon event at the 1951 Pan American Games was held at the Estadio Monumental in Buenos Aires on 4 and 5 March.

== Results ==
The highest mark recorded in each event is highlighted in yellow

Rank	Athlete	Nationality	100m	LJ	SP	HJ	400m	110m H	DT	PV	JT	1500m	Points	Notes
1st place, gold medalist(s)	Hernán Figueroa	Chile	11.3	6.78	13.33	1.70	53.1	16.6	36.40	3.30	53.01	5:00.6	6610	
2nd place, silver medalist(s)	Hernán Alzamora	Peru	11.6	6.36	11.16	1.80	52.8	15.2	31.11	2.80	42.23	4:56.4	6063	
3rd place, bronze medalist(s)	Enrique Salazar	Guatemala	11.8	5.09	9.27	1.40	54.0	20.4	25.28	2.80	40.75	5:00.5	4380	
	Enrique Kistenmacher	Argentina	11.6	4.97	?	–	–	–	–	–	–	–	DNF	
	Gerardo Mielke	Argentina	–	–	–	–	–	–	–	–	–	–	DNS	
	Celestino Sarrua	Argentina	–	–	–	–	–	–	–	–	–	–	DNS	
