= Sergio Guzmán =

Chilean sprinter

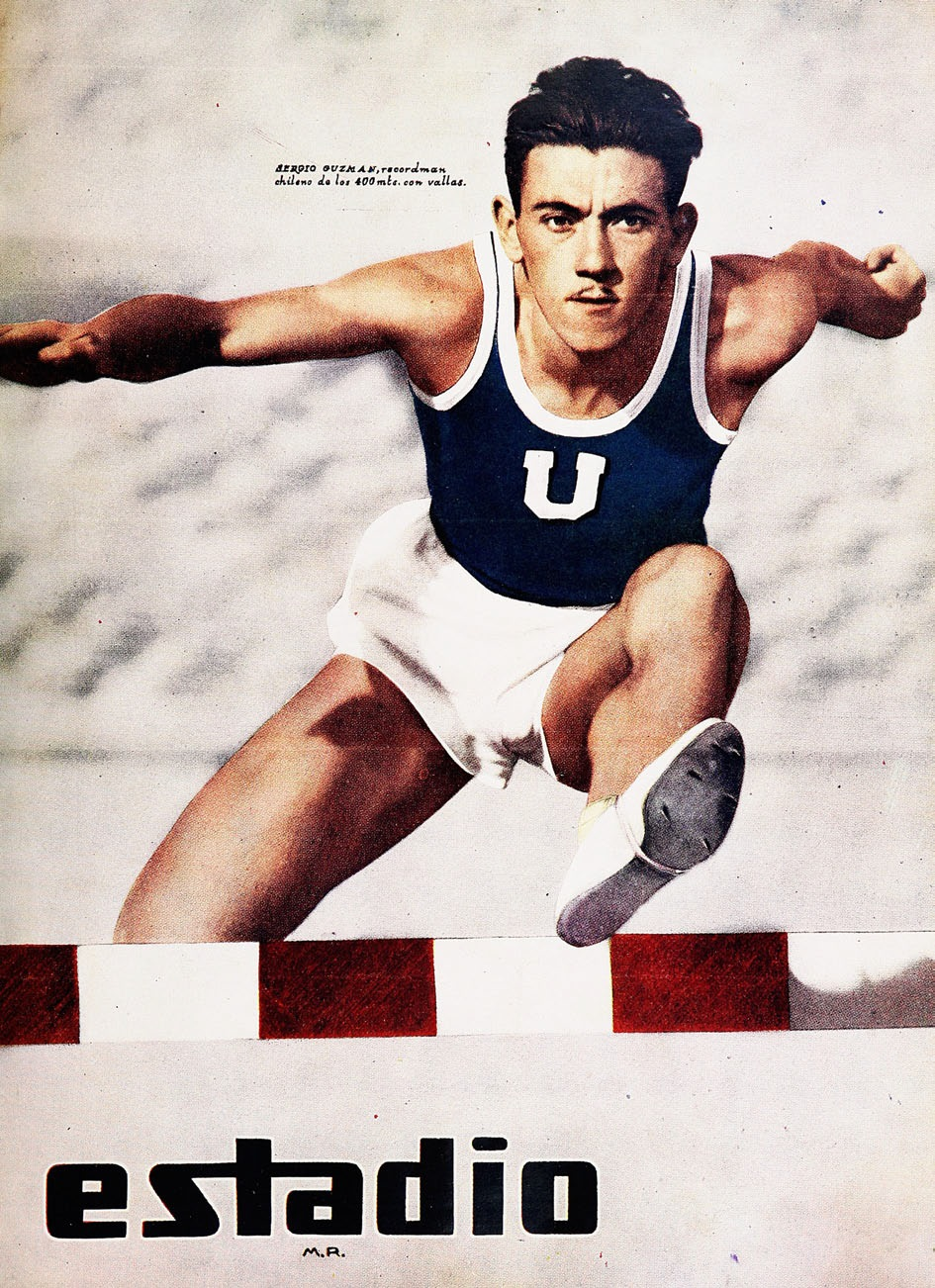

Personal information
- Nationality: Chilean
- Born: 20 June 1924
- Died: 21 October 2016 (aged 92)
- Height: 1.82 m (6 ft 0 in)
- Weight: 67 kg (148 lb)

Sport
- Sport: Sprinting
- Event: 400 metres hurdles

Sergio Guzmán Lira (20 June 1924 – 21 October 2016) was a Chilean hurdler. He competed in the men's 4 × 400 metres relay at the 1948 Summer Olympics.

== International competitions ==
| Year | Competition | Venue | Position | Event | Notes |
Representing Chile
| 1947 | South American Championships | Rio de Janeiro, Brazil | 1st | 400 m hurdles | 54.8 |
| 1947 | South American Championships | Rio de Janeiro, Brazil | 2nd | 4 × 400 m relay | 3:17.0 |
| 1948 | Olympic Games | London, United Kingdom | 18th (h) | 400 m hurdles | 55.9 |
| 1948 | Olympic Games | London, United Kingdom | 11th (h) | 4 × 400 m relay | 3:23.8 |
| 1948 | South American Championships (unofficial) | La Paz, Bolivia | 3rd | 400 m | 51.0 |
| 1948 | South American Championships (unofficial) | La Paz, Bolivia | 3rd | 800 m | 2:05.1 |
| 1948 | South American Championships (unofficial) | La Paz, Bolivia | 3rd | 200 m hurdles | 26.5 |
| 1948 | South American Championships (unofficial) | La Paz, Bolivia | 2ns | 4 × 100 m relay | 43.2 |
| 1949 | South American Championships | Lima, Peru | 10th (h) | 400 m hurdles | 57.7 |

== Personal bests ==
- 400 metres – 49.5h (1947)
- 400 metres hurdles – 53.9h (1946)
