= Athletics at the 1955 Pan American Games – Men's decathlon =

Men's decathlon at the Pan American Games

The men's decathlon event at the 1955 Pan American Games was held at the Estadio Universitario in Mexico City on 18 and 19 March.

== Results ==
The highest mark recorded in each event is highlighted in yellow

Rank	Athlete	Nationality	100m	LJ	SP	HJ	400m	110m H	DT	PV	JT	1500m	Points	Notes
1st place, gold medalist(s)	Rafer Johnson	United States	11.04	7.19	13.43	1.89	51.02	14.89	43.83	3.70	53.58	5:47.83	6994	
2nd place, silver medalist(s)	Bob Richards	United States	11.25	7.11	13.59	1.83	51.14	15.86	38.39	4.50	55.25	DNF	6886	
3rd place, bronze medalist(s)	Hernán Figueroa	Chile	11.62	6.45	13.28	1.75	52.57	16.19	38.88	3.40	52.33	5:27.57	5740	
4	Brigido Iriarte	Venezuela	11.72	6.90	11.89	1.65	54.98	17.22	38.01	3.60	49.96	DNF	5253	
5	Carlos Vera	Chile	11.38	7.10	9.70	1.80	51.54	16.28	26.13	DNS	–	–	4365	
6	Javier González	Mexico	12.08	5.67	9.18	1.47	54.33	17.93	29.83	2.91	41.37	4:56.75	4108	
