= Julia Sánchez =

Peruvian sprinter (1930–2001)

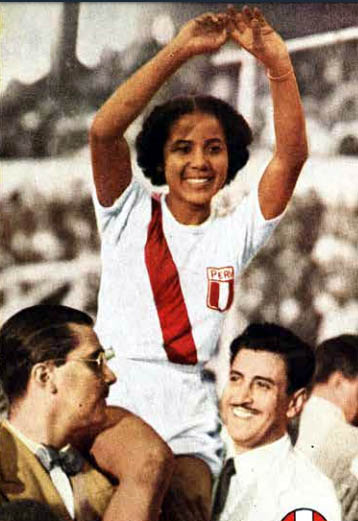

Medal record

Women's athletics

Representing Peru

Pan American Games
Gold medal – first place	1951 Buenos Aires	100 m

Julia Sánchez Deza (28 January 1930 – 19 December 2001) was a Peruvian female track and field sprinter. Her greatest achievement was a gold medal in the 100 metres at the inaugural 1951 Pan American Games, seeing off Jean Patton of the United States. She was one of two Peruvian gold medallists at the games, alongside men's shooter Edwin Vásquez Cam. She remained her country's only female champion until hurdler Edith Noeding matched the feat in 1975.

She was born and died in the capital, Lima. She attended the National Physical Institute at the National University of San Marcos. For her achievements, she was awarded the Laureles Deoprtivos from the state of Peru.

Sánchez won back-to-back 100 m titles at the South American Championships in Athletics in 1949 and 1952. She was also a multiple medallist at the 1948 Extraordinary Championships, held to celebrate 400 years since La Paz's foundation: there she won golds in the 200 metres and long jump, as well as a high jump silver. Her first major international games was also her most successful: at the Bolivarian Games over 1947 and 1948, she was a three-time champion (50 metres, 100 m and 4 × 100 metres relay) and won a further two medals in the long and high jump.

== International competitions ==
Year	Competition	Venue	Position	Event	Notes
1947	Bolivarian Games	Lima, Peru	1st	50 m	6.8
1947	Bolivarian Games	Lima, Peru	1st	100 m	13.3
1947	Bolivarian Games	Lima, Peru	1st	4 × 100 m relay	52.4
1947	Bolivarian Games	Lima, Peru	3rd	High jump	1.33 m
1947	Bolivarian Games	Lima, Peru	2nd	Long jump	4.76 m
1948	South American Championships (unofficial)	La Paz, Bolivia	1st	200 m	26.1 A
1948	South American Championships (unofficial)	La Paz, Bolivia	1st	4 × 100 m relay	51.6 A
1948	South American Championships (unofficial)	La Paz, Bolivia	2nd	High jump	1.40 m A
1948	South American Championships (unofficial)	La Paz, Bolivia	1st	Long jump	5.04 m A
1949	South American Championships	Lima, Peru	1st	100 m	12.7
1949	South American Championships	Lima, Peru	4th	200 m	26.6
1949	South American Championships	Lima, Peru	4th	4 × 100 m relay	51.3
1949	South American Championships	Lima, Peru	4th	Long jump	5.27 m
1951	Pan American Games	Buenos Aires, Argentina	1st	100 m	12.2
1952	South American Championships	Buenos Aires, Argentina	1st	100 m	12.2 CR
1952	South American Championships	Buenos Aires, Argentina	6th (h)	200 m	26.4
1952	South American Championships	Buenos Aires, Argentina	4th	Long jump	5.24 m
