= Edmundo Zúñiga =

Chilean hammer thrower (1920–1973)

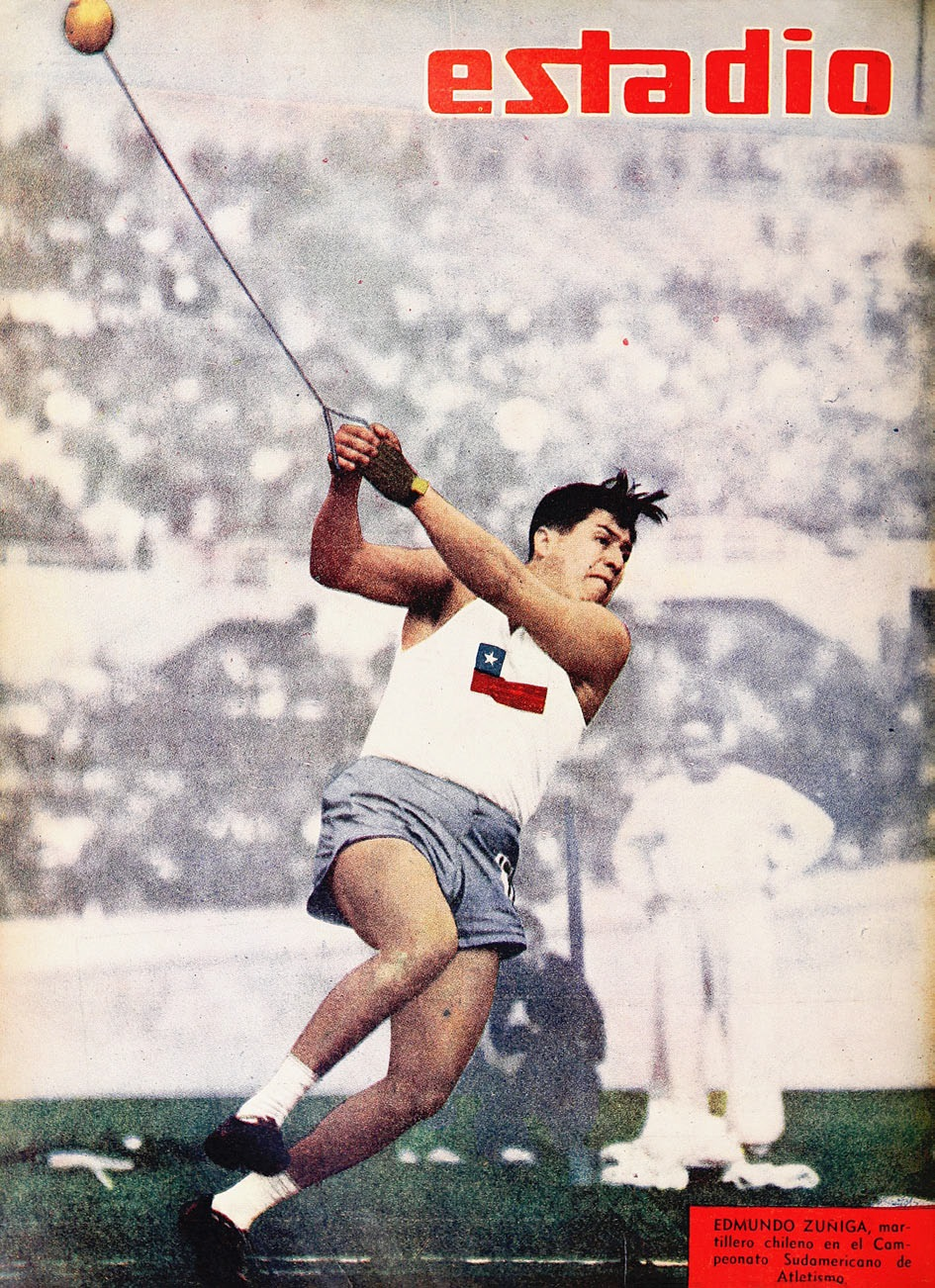

Personal information
- Full name: Edmundo Zúñiga Erraz
- Nationality: Chilean
- Born: 1920
- Died: 10 February 1973 (aged 52–53) Arica, Chile
- Height: 1.80 m (5 ft 11 in)
- Weight: 95 kg (209 lb)

Sport
- Sport: Athletics
- Event: Hammer throw

Edmundo Zúñiga Erraz (1920 – 10 February 1973) was a Chilean athlete. He competed in the men's hammer throw at the 1948 Summer Olympics. Zúñiga died in Arica on 10 February 1973.

== International competitions ==
| Year | Competition | Venue | Position | Event | Notes |
Representing Chile
| 1946 | South American Championships (unofficial) | Santiago, Chile | 3rd | Hammer throw | 47.14 m |
| 1947 | South American Championships | Rio de Janeiro, Brazil | 1st | Hammer throw | 49.07 m |
| 1948 | Olympic Games | London, United Kingdom | 21st (q) | Hammer throw | 44.03 m |
| 1948 | South American Championships (unofficial) | La Paz, Bolivia | 1st | Hammer throw | 45.28 m |
| 1949 | South American Championships | Lima, Peru | 1st | Hammer throw | 50.67 m |
| 1950 | South American Championships (unofficial) | Montevideo, Uruguay | 3rd | Hammer throw | 48.80 m |
| 1956 | South American Championships | Santiago, Chile | 2nd | Hammer throw | 51.71 m |
| 1961 | South American Championships | Lima, Peru | 6th | Hammer throw | 46.01 m |

== Personal bests ==
- Hammer throw – 51.71 metres (1956)
