= Hernán Figueroa =

Chilean decathlete

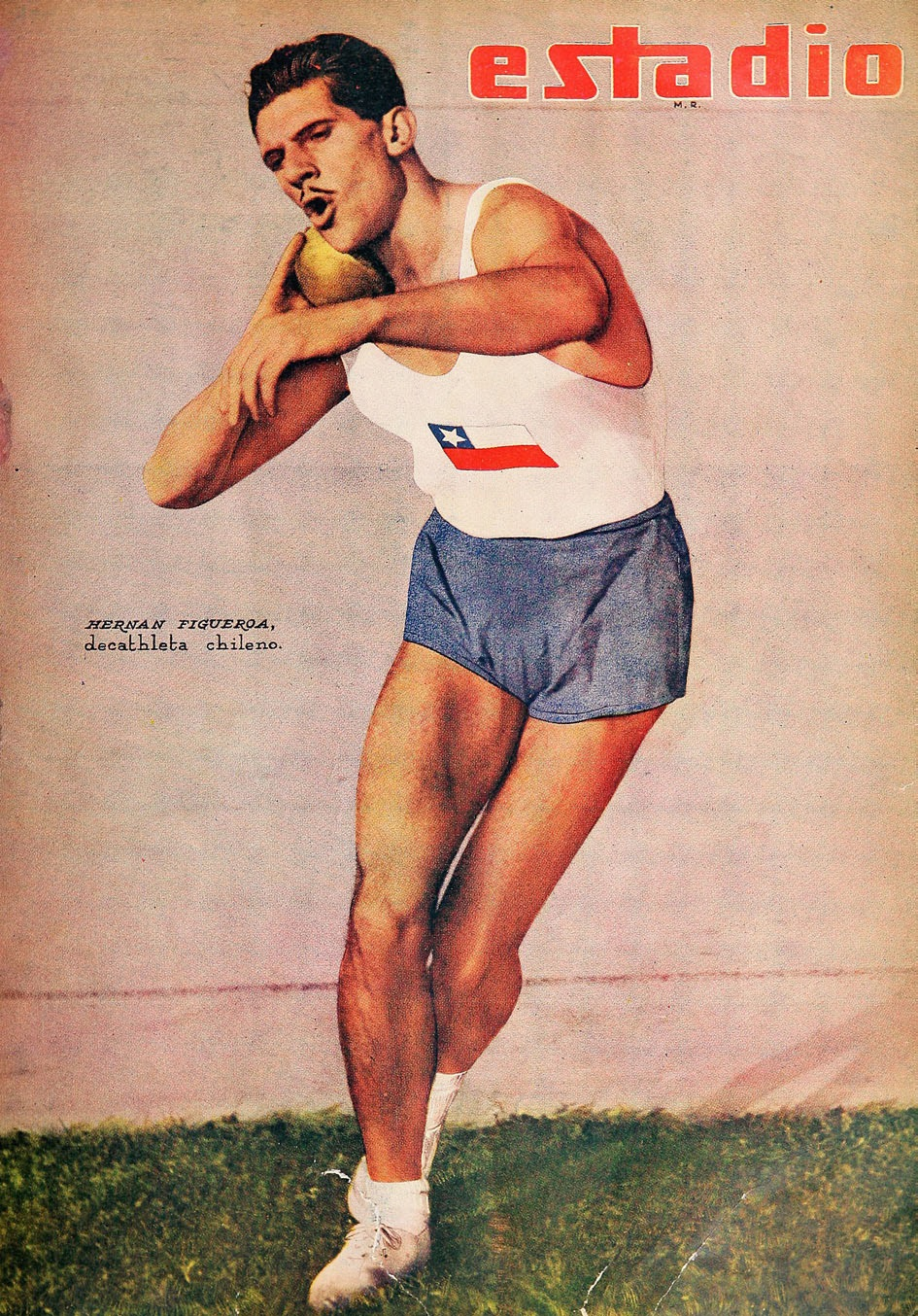
- Figueroa in 1949

Personal information
- Full name: Hernán Armando Figueroa Burg
- Born: 27 August 1927
- Died: September 2013 (aged 86)
- Height: 1.83 m (6 ft 0 in)
- Weight: 82 kg (181 lb)

Sport
- Sport: Track and field
- Event: Decathlon
Medal record
Men's athletics
Representing Chile
Pan American Games
| Gold medal – first place | 1951 Buenos Aires | Decathlon |
| Bronze medal – third place | 1955 Mexico City | Decathlon |
South American Championships
| Gold medal – first place | 1952 Buenos Aires | Decathlon |

Hernán Figueroa Bueg (26 August 1927 – September 2013) was a decathlete from Chile. He won the gold medal in the men's decathlon event at the inaugural Pan American Games in 1951. He is a two-time Olympian (1948 and 1952) for his native South American country. In the mid-1970s, he is credited with instigating development of the sport's division of Masters athletics, encouraging the formation of organizations across South America.

== International competitions ==
| Year | Competition | Venue | Position | Event | Notes |
Representing Chile
| 1947 | South American Championships | Rio de Janeiro, Brazil | 9th | Decathlon | 5633 pts |
| 1948 | Olympic Games | London, United Kingdom | 20th | Decathlon | 6026 pts |
| 1948 | South American Championships (unofficial) | La Paz, Bolivia | 4th | 110 m hurdles | NT |
| 1948 | South American Championships (unofficial) | La Paz, Bolivia | 1st | Shot put | 13.50 m |
| 1948 | South American Championships (unofficial) | La Paz, Bolivia | 3rd | Discus throw | 35.74 m |
| 1949 | South American Championships | Lima, Peru | 6th | Shot put | 12.935 m |
| 1950 | South American Championships (unofficial) | Montevideo, Uruguay | 3rd | Long jump | 6.45 m |
| 1950 | South American Championships (unofficial) | Montevideo, Uruguay | 4th | Shot put | 11.99 m |
| 1950 | South American Championships (unofficial) | Montevideo, Uruguay | 1st | Decathlon | 6584 pts |
| 1951 | Pan American Games | Buenos Aires, Argentina | 1st | Decathlon | 6610 pts |
| 1952 | South American Championships | Buenos Aires, Argentina | 8th | Shot put | 13.08 m |
| 1952 | South American Championships | Buenos Aires, Argentina | 1st | Decathlon | 6698 pts |
| 1952 | Olympic Games | Helsinki, Finland | 17th | Decathlon | 5592 pts |
| 1954 | South American Championships | São Paulo, Brazil | 7th | Shot put | 12.66 m |
| 1954 | South American Championships | São Paulo, Brazil | 4th | Decathlon | 5630 pts |
| 1955 | Pan American Games | Mexico City, Mexico | 3rd | Decathlon | 5740 pts |
| 1956 | South American Championships | Santiago, Chile | – | Decathlon | DNF |
| 1957 | South American Championships (unofficial) | Santiago, Chile | 1st | Decathlon | 5492 pts |
| 1958 | South American Championships | Montevideo, Uruguay | 4th | Decathlon | 5530 pts |
| 1959 | South American Championships (unofficial) | São Paulo, Brazil | 5th | Decathlon | 5176 pts |

== Personal bests ==
- Decathlon – 6295 (1952)
