= Máximo Reyes =

Peruvian sprinter (1923–1989)

Personal information
- Full name: Máximo Reyes Anchante
- Nationality: Peruvian
- Born: 8 January 1923 Pisco, Peru
- Died: 1989 (aged 65–66)

Sport
- Sport: Athletics
- Events: 100 metres, long jump, triple jump

Máximo Reyes Anchante (8 January 1923 – 1989) was a Peruvian sprinter. He competed in the men's 100 metres at the 1948 Summer Olympics. Reyes died in 1989.

== International competitions ==
Year	Competition	Venue	Position	Event	Notes
Representing Peru
1947	Bolivarian Games	Lima, Peru	3rd	Long jump	6.32 m
1947	Bolivarian Games	Lima, Peru	2nd	Tirple jump	14.32 m
1947	Bolivarian Games	Lima, Peru	2nd	Pentathlon	2666 pts
1948	Olympic Games	London, United Kingdom	23rd (h)	100 m	11.04
1948	Olympic Games	London, United Kingdom	15th (q)	Triple jump	14.380 m
1948	South American Championships (unofficial)	La Paz, Bolivia	2nd	Long jump	6.84 m
1948	South American Championships (unofficial)	La Paz, Bolivia	2nd	Triple jump	14.27 m
1949	South American Championships	Lima, Peru	5th	100 m	11.0
1949	South American Championships	Lima, Peru	1st	4 × 100 m relay	42.3
1949	South American Championships	Lima, Peru	3rd	Long jump	7.04 m
1951	Bolivarian Games	Caracas, Venezuela	6th (h)	100 m	11.2
1951	Bolivarian Games	Caracas, Venezuela	1st	4 × 100 m relay	42.0
1952	South American Championships	Buenos Aires, Argentina	5th	100 m	11.0
1952	South American Championships	Buenos Aires, Argentina	2nd	4 × 100 m relay	42.0
1952	South American Championships	Buenos Aires, Argentina	9th	Long jump	6.35 m
1953	South American Championships (unofficial)	Santiago, Chile	5th	4 × 100 m relay	45.0
1954	South American Championships	São Paulo, Brazil	6th	100 m	11.0
1954	South American Championships	São Paulo, Brazil	2nd	4 × 100 m relay	41.8

== Personal bests ==
- 100 metres – 10.8h (1952)
- Triple jump – 14.66 metres (1948)
