= Gerardo Salazar =

Personal information
- Full name: Gerardo Salazar Espino
- Nationality: Peruvian
- Born: 15 September 1929 Chiclayo, Peru

Sport
- Sport: Athletics
- Events: 100 metres, 200 metres

Gerardo Salazar Espino (born 15 September 1929 in Chiclayo) was a Peruvian sprinter. He won multiple medals at regional level. He started competing in sprints in 1948 having played football before that.

== International competitions ==
Year	Competition	Venue	Position	Event	Notes
Representing Peru
1948	South American Championships (unofficial)	La Paz, Bolivia	1st	100 m	10.6
1948	South American Championships (unofficial)	La Paz, Bolivia	1st	200 m	21.8
1948	South American Championships (unofficial)	La Paz, Bolivia	1st	4 × 100 m relay	42.8
1949	South American Championships	Lima, Peru	1st	100 m	10.7
1949	South American Championships	Lima, Peru	1st	4 × 100 m relay	42.3
1951	Pan American Games	Buenos Aires, Argentina	6th	100 m	11.1
1951	Pan American Games	Buenos Aires, Argentina	6th	4 × 100 m relay	NT
1951	Bolivarian Games	Caracas, Venezuela	1st	100 m	10.9
1951	Bolivarian Games	Caracas, Venezuela	1st	200 m	22.1
1951	Bolivarian Games	Caracas, Venezuela	1st	4 × 100 m relay	42.0
1952	South American Championships	Buenos Aires, Argentina	1st	100 m	10.7
1952	South American Championships	Buenos Aires, Argentina	2nd	4 × 100 m relay	42.0
1952	South American Championships	Buenos Aires, Argentina	5th	4 × 400 m relay	3:25.7
1953	South American Championships (unofficial)	Santiago, Chile	3rd	100 m	11.0
1953	South American Championships (unofficial)	Santiago, Chile	6th	4 × 100 m relay	45.0
1954	South American Championships	São Paulo, Brazil	5th (h)	100 m	10.7
1954	South American Championships	São Paulo, Brazil	6th	4 × 100 m relay	41.8
1956	South American Championships	Santiago, Chile	8th (h)	100 m	11.0
1956	South American Championships	Santiago, Chile	–	4 × 100 m relay	DQ

== Personal bests ==
- 100 metres – 10.6h (La Paz 1948)
- 200 metres – 21.8h (La Paz 1948)
