= Benedicta de Oliveira =

Brazilian sprinter (1927–2020)

Personal information
- Full name: Benedicta Souza de Oliveira
- Born: 10 October 1927 Jundiaí, Brazil
- Died: 14 September 2020 (aged 92) Santos, São Paulo, Brazil

Sport
- Sport: Sprinting
- Event: 100 metres

Benedicta Souza de Oliveira (10 October 1927 – 14 September 2020) was a Brazilian sprinter. She competed in the women's 100 metres at the 1948 Summer Olympics.

== International competitions ==
Year	Competition	Venue	Position	Event	Notes
Representing Brazil
1948	Olympic Games	London, United Kingdom	4th (h)	100 m	13.2e
1948	Olympic Games	London, United Kingdom	8th (h)	4 × 100 m relay	49.0
1949	South American Championships	Lima, Peru	3rd	100 m	12.8
1949	South American Championships	Lima, Peru	3rd	200 m	26.5
1949	South American Championships	Lima, Peru	1st	4 × 100 m relay	49.2
1952	South American Championships	Buenos Aires, Argentina	9th (h)	100 m	12.7
1952	South American Championships	Buenos Aires, Argentina	5th	200 m	26.3
1952	South American Championships	Buenos Aires, Argentina	2nd	4 × 100 m relay	48.8
1953	South American Championships (unofficial)	Santiago, Chile	4th	200 m	26.2
1953	South American Championships (unofficial)	Santiago, Chile	1st	4 × 100 m relay	48.2
1954	South American Championships	São Paulo, Brazil	1st	100 m	12.3 (w)
1954	South American Championships	São Paulo, Brazil	3rd	200 m	26.2
1954	South American Championships	São Paulo, Brazil	2nd	4 × 100 m relay	48.6

== Personal bests ==
- 100 metres – 12.3h (1953)
