= 1952 South American Championships in Athletics – Results =

These are the results of the 1952 South American Championships in Athletics which took place at the Estadio River Plate in Buenos Aires, Argentina, between 3 and 11 May.

== Men's results ==
=== 100 metres ===
Heats – 3 May
Wind:
Heat 1: -0.8 m/s, Heat 2: -0.1 m/s, Heat 3: -0.4 m/s, Heat 4: +0.7 m/s

Rank	Heat	Name	Nationality	Time	Notes
1	1	Armando Zapata	Peru	10.8	Q
2	1	Luis Montico	Argentina	11.0	Q
3	1	Walter Pérez	Uruguay	11.0	Q
4	1	Fernando Salinas	Chile	11.0	
1	2	Gerardo Salazar	Peru	10.8	Q
2	2	Geraldo Murgel	Brazil	10.9	Q
3	2	Romeo Galán	Argentina	10.9	Q
4	2	Arturo Flores	Ecuador	11.0	
5	2	Anastasio Zelaya	Paraguay	11.3	
1	3	Máximo Reyes	Peru	10.8	Q
2	3	José Zelaya	Paraguay	11.1	Q
3	3	Mario Fayos	Uruguay	11.1	Q
4	3	Ary de Sá	Brazil	11.1	
5	3	Andrés Jeannerette	Chile	11.1	
1	4	Gerardo Bönnhoff	Argentina	10.6	Q
2	4	José Telles da Conceição	Brazil	10.9	Q
3	4	Aníbal Estradé	Uruguay	10.9	Q
4	4	Boris Tomicic	Chile	11.0	
5	4	Mario Drouet	Ecuador	11.3	

Semifinals – 3 May
Wind:
Heat 1: +1.0 m/s, Heat 2: +0.5 m/s

Rank	Heat	Name	Nationality	Time	Notes
1	1	Armando Zapata	Peru	10.9	Q
2	1	José Zelaya	Paraguay	11.0	Q
3	1	Máximo Reyes	Peru	11.0	Q
4	1	Mario Fayos	Uruguay	11.0	
5	1	Luis Montico	Argentina	11.0	
6	1	Walter Pérez	Uruguay	11.1	
1	2	Gerardo Bönnhoff	Argentina	10.7	Q
2	2	Gerardo Salazar	Peru	10.8	Q
3	2	José Telles da Conceição	Brazil	10.8	Q
4	2	Geraldo Murgel	Brazil	10.8	
5	2	Romeo Galán	Argentina	10.9	
6	2	Aníbal Estradé	Uruguay	11.0	

Final – 4 May
Wind: -0.1 m/s

Rank	Lane	Name	Nationality	Time	Notes
1st place, gold medalist(s)	2	Gerardo Salazar	Peru	10.7	
2nd place, silver medalist(s)	5	Gerardo Bönnhoff	Argentina	10.8	
3rd place, bronze medalist(s)	6	José Telles da Conceição	Brazil	10.8	
4	1	Armando Zapata	Peru	10.9	
5	4	Máximo Reyes	Peru	11.0	
6	3	José Zelaya	Paraguay	11.0	

=== 200 metres ===
Heats – 6 May

Rank	Heat	Name	Nationality	Time	Notes
1	1	Óscar Maldonado	Peru	22.4	Q
2	1	Mario Fayos	Uruguay	22.4	Q
3	1	Geraldo Murgel	Brazil	22.5	Q
4	1	Luis Montico	Argentina	22.7	
5	1	Andrés Jeannerette	Chile	23.1	
1	2	Gerardo Bönnhoff	Argentina	22.2	Q
2	2	Ary de Sá	Brazil	22.9	Q
3	2	Mario Drouet	Ecuador	23.1	Q
4	2	Santiago Ferrando	Peru	23.2	
5	2	Anastasio Zelaya	Paraguay	23.4	
1	3	Arturo Flores	Ecuador	22.8	Q
2	3	Juan Romero	Uruguay	23.0	Q
3	3	Gustavo Ehlers	Chile	24.0	Q
1	4	Alexandre Netto	Brazil	22.2	Q
2	4	Fernando Lapuente	Argentina	22.8	Q
3	4	Fernando Salinas	Chile	22.8	Q
4	4	Ciro Brazeiro	Uruguay	23.1	

Semifinals – 6 May

Rank	Heat	Name	Nationality	Time	Notes
1	1	Gustavo Ehlers	Chile	22.1	Q
2	1	Mario Fayos	Uruguay	22.6	Q
3	1	Óscar Maldonado	Peru	22.6	Q
4	1	Geraldo Murgel	Brazil	22.6	
5	1	Arturo Flores	Ecuador	22.6	
6	1	Juan Romero	Uruguay	22.8	
1	2	Gerardo Bönnhoff	Argentina	21.8	Q
2	2	Alexandre Netto	Brazil	22.1	Q
3	2	Fernando Lapuente	Argentina	22.1	Q
4	2	Ary de Sá	Brazil	22.7	
5	2	Mario Drouet	Ecuador	22.9	
6	2	Fernando Salinas	Chile	23.1	

Final – 8 May

Rank	Lane	Name	Nationality	Time	Notes
1st place, gold medalist(s)	4	Gerardo Bönnhoff	Argentina	21.5	
2nd place, silver medalist(s)	5	Fernando Lapuente	Argentina	22.0	
3rd place, bronze medalist(s)	1	Gustavo Ehlers	Chile	22.0	
4	3	Mario Fayos	Uruguay	22.2	
5	6	Alexandre Netto	Brazil	22.5	
6	2	Óscar Maldonado	Peru	22.6	

=== 400 metres ===
Heats – 3 May

Rank	Heat	Name	Nationality	Time	Notes
1	1	Gustavo Ehlers	Chile	49.9	Q
2	1	Mário do Nascimento	Brazil	50.7	Q
3	1	Mario Drouet	Ecuador	51.0	
4	1	Máximo Guerra	Argentina	51.4	
1	2	Geraldo Maranhão	Brazil	50.1	Q
2	2	Ramón Sandoval	Chile	50.3	Q
3	2	Eduardo Balducci	Argentina	50.3	
4	2	Óscar Maldonado	Peru	52.0	
5	2	Óscar Corvalán	Paraguay	52.5	
6	2	Félix Pery	Uruguay	52.7	
1	3	Argemiro Roque	Brazil	49.7	Q
2	3	Reinaldo Martín	Chile	50.4	Q
3	3	Federico Jacobs	Argentina	50.4	
4	3	Santiago Ferrando	Peru	58.1	

Final – 4 May

Rank	Name	Nationality	Time	Notes
1st place, gold medalist(s)	Gustavo Ehlers	Chile	48.7	
2nd place, silver medalist(s)	Argemiro Roque	Brazil	49.1	
3rd place, bronze medalist(s)	Mário do Nascimento	Brazil	49.7	
4	Reinaldo Martín	Chile	49.8	
5	Geraldo Maranhão	Brazil	50.5	
6	Ramón Sandoval	Chile	50.5	

=== 800 metres ===
Heats – 6 May

Rank	Heat	Name	Nationality	Time	Notes
1	1	Waldomiro Monteiro	Brazil	2:01.2	Q
2	1	Carlos Gajardo	Chile	2:01.4	Q
3	1	Argemiro Roque	Brazil	2:01.4	Q
4	1	Jorge Lombao	Argentina	2:01.7	
5	1	Orlando Arévalo	Uruguay	2:02.1	
6	1	Rubén Figueredo	Paraguay	2:03.7	
1	2	Odilon Dias Netto	Brazil	1:57.2	Q
2	2	Nilo Riveros	Argentina	1:57.4	Q
3	2	Ricardo Vidal	Chile	1:57.4	Q
4	2	Juan López	Peru	1:57.5	
5	2	Adolfo Augustyn	Argentina	1:57.5	
6	2	Luis Saavedra	Chile	1:58.4	

Final – 8 May

Rank	Name	Nationality	Time	Notes
1st place, gold medalist(s)	Argemiro Roque	Brazil	1:53.3	CR, NR
2nd place, silver medalist(s)	Waldomiro Monteiro	Brazil	1:53.9	
3rd place, bronze medalist(s)	Carlos Gajardo	Chile	1:55.3	
4	Ricardo Vidal	Chile	1:55.7	
5	Nilo Riveros	Argentina	1:55.8	
6	Odilon Dias Netto	Brazil	1:56.2	

=== 1500 metres ===
4 May

Rank	Name	Nationality	Time	Notes
1st place, gold medalist(s)	Nilo Riveros	Argentina	3:58.5	
2nd place, silver medalist(s)	Guillermo Solá	Chile	3:59.6	
3rd place, bronze medalist(s)	Luís Rodrigues	Brazil	4:00.3	
4	Antônio Roque	Brazil	4:01.5	
5	Ricardo Vidal	Chile	4:02.1	
6	Osvaldo Suárez	Argentina	4:02.9	
	Laudionor da Silva	Brazil	NT	
	Enrique Chávez	Chile	NT	
	José Carlos González	Argentina	NT	
	Luis Pisconti-Flores	Peru	NT	

=== 5000 metres ===
3 May

Rank	Name	Nationality	Time	Notes
1st place, gold medalist(s)	Raúl Inostroza	Chile	14:59.8	
2nd place, silver medalist(s)	Reinaldo Gorno	Argentina	15:05.5	
3rd place, bronze medalist(s)	Juan Miranda	Argentina	15:09.0	
4	Alfonso Cornejo	Chile	15:10.6	
5	Gustavo Rojas	Chile	15:16.4	
6	Walter Lemos	Argentina	15:21.0	
	Pedro de Andrade	Brazil	NT	
	Edgard Mitt	Brazil	NT	
	João Oitica	Brazil	NT	
	Albero Pinares	Uruguay	NT	
	Amparo Achucarro	Paraguay	NT	

=== 10,000 metres ===
8 May

Rank	Name	Nationality	Time	Notes
1st place, gold medalist(s)	Delfo Cabrera	Argentina	31:05.7	
2nd place, silver medalist(s)	Raúl Inostroza	Chile	31:26.9	
3rd place, bronze medalist(s)	Corsino Fernández	Argentina	31:32.3	
4	Ezequiel Bustamante	Argentina	32:14.9	
5	Geraldo Felipe	Brazil	32:15.2	
6	Gustavo Rojas	Chile	32:28.1	
	João Oitica	Brazil	NT	
	Luís Rodrigues	Brazil	NT	
	Alberto Pinales	Uruguay	NT	
	Alfonso Cornejo	Chile	NT	

=== Half marathon ===
11 May

Rank	Name	Nationality	Time	Notes
1st place, gold medalist(s)	Delfo Cabrera	Argentina	1:09:19	CR
2nd place, silver medalist(s)	Reinaldo Gorno	Argentina	1:11:28	
3rd place, bronze medalist(s)	Corsino Fernández	Argentina	1:11:28	
4	João Oitica	Brazil	1:13:13	
5	Gustavo Rojas	Chile	1:13:41	
6	Gilberto Sánchez	Uruguay	1:13:52	
7	Enrique Inostroza	Chile	1:14:??	
8	Luis Celedón	Chile	1:14:??	
9	Gerardo Felipe	Brazil	NT	
	Pedro de Andrade	Brazil	NT	
	Luis Calderón	Ecuador	NT	
	Wenceslao Barzola	Peru	NT	
	Juan Gao	Uruguay	NT	
	Alberto Pinales	Uruguay	NT	

=== 110 metres hurdles ===
Heats – 4 May
Wind:
Heat 1: 0.0 m/s, Heat 2: -0.3 m/s

Rank	Heat	Name	Nationality	Time	Notes
1	1	Estanislao Kocourek	Argentina	14.6	Q
2	1	Carlos Claro	Chile	15.0	Q
3	1	Hernán Alzamora	Peru	15.2	Q
4	1	Jorge de Medeiros	Brazil	15.4	
5	1	Julio Ramírez	Uruguay	15.7	
1	2	Wilson Carneiro	Brazil	14.9	Q
2	2	Jörn Gevert	Chile	15.1	Q
3	2	Ijoel da Silva	Brazil	15.1	Q
4	2	Ricardo Scipioni	Argentina	15.2	
5	2	Francisco Pieslinger	Argentina	15.7	

Final – 6 May

Wind: -1.7 m/s

Rank	Name	Nationality	Time	Notes
1st place, gold medalist(s)	Jörn Gevert	Chile	14.9	
2nd place, silver medalist(s)	Estanislao Kocourek	Argentina	15.0	
3rd place, bronze medalist(s)	Wilson Carneiro	Brazil	15.1	
4	Carlos Claro	Chile	15.2	
5	Hernán Alzamora	Peru	15.3	
6	Ijoel da Silva	Brazil	15.4	

=== 400 metres hurdles ===
Heats – 8 May

Rank	Heat	Name	Nationality	Time	Notes
1	1	Wilson Carneiro	Brazil	54.4	Q
2	1	Jörn Gevert	Chile	54.5	Q
3	1	Reinaldo Martín	Chile	54.7	Q
4	1	Ernesto Igler	Argentina	54.9	
5	1	Ernesto Rogg	Argentina	56.6	
1	2	Pedro Yoma	Chile	54.6	Q
2	2	Juan Carlos Isola	Argentina	56.4	Q
3	2	Mario Drouet	Ecuador	56.4	Q
4	2	Ulisses dos Santos	Brazil	56.5	
5	2	Landualdo da Silva	Brazil	57.0	

Final – 10 May

Rank	Name	Nationality	Time	Notes
1st place, gold medalist(s)	Wilson Carneiro	Brazil	52.7	AR
2nd place, silver medalist(s)	Jörn Gevert	Chile	53.5	
3rd place, bronze medalist(s)	Pedro Yoma	Chile	54.6	
4	Reinaldo Martín	Chile	55.4	
5	Juan Carlos Isola	Argentina	56.2	
6	Mario Drouet	Ecuador	57.3	NR

=== 3000 metres steeplechase ===
10 May

Rank	Name	Nationality	Time	Notes
1st place, gold medalist(s)	Guillermo Solá	Chile	9:32.0	AR
2nd place, silver medalist(s)	Edgard Mitt	Brazil	9:34.6	
3rd place, bronze medalist(s)	Haroldo Gallardo	Chile	9:38.4	
4	Pedro de Andrade	Brazil	9:41.1	
5	Rómulo Gomes	Brazil	9:46.0	
6	Guillermo San Miguel	Argentina	9:51.5	
7	Jorge González	Chile	NT	
	Pedro Caffa	Argentina	NT	
	Luis Pisconti-Flores	Peru	NT	
	Juan Carlos Carranza	Argentina	NT	

=== 4 × 100 metres relay ===
10 May

Rank	Nation	Competitors	Time	Notes
1st place, gold medalist(s)	Argentina	Enrique Beckles, Mariano Acosta, Gerardo Bönnhoff, Romeo Galán	41.4	AR
2nd place, silver medalist(s)	Peru	Gerardo Salazar, Máximo Reyes, Óscar Maldonado, Armando Zapata	42.0	
3rd place, bronze medalist(s)	Brazil	Alexandre Netto, Rui Lima, Geraldo Murgel, Ary de Sá	42.2	
4	Chile	Gustavo Ehlers, Fernando Salinas, Jörn Gevert, Boris Tomicic	42.5	
5	Uruguay	Ciro Braceiro, Aníbal Estradé, Walter Pérez, Mario Fayos	42.5	
6	Paraguay	José Zelaya, Anastasio Zelaya, José Giménez, Nelson Núñez	44.9	

=== 4 × 400 metres relay ===
11 May

Rank	Nation	Competitors	Time	Notes
1st place, gold medalist(s)	Brazil	Wilson Carneiro, Geraldo Maranhão, Mário do Nascimento, Argemiro Roque	3:17.5	
2nd place, silver medalist(s)	Argentina	Máximo Guerra, Enrique Kistenmacher, Adán Torres, Gerardo Bönnhoff	3:18.0	
3rd place, bronze medalist(s)	Chile	Ramón Sandoval, Carlos Gajardo, Reinaldo Martín, Gustavo Ehlers	3:18.1	
4	Uruguay	Juan Romero, Emir Miller, Orlando Arévalo, Mario Fayos	3:25.7	
5	Peru	Juan López, Óscar Maldonado, Gerardo Salazar, Armando Zapata	3:25.7	
6	Paraguay	José Zelaya, Anastasio Zelaya, Óscar Ré, Rubén Figueredo	3:28.8	

=== High jump ===
3 May

Rank	Name	Nationality	Result	Notes
1st place, gold medalist(s)	José Telles da Conceição	Brazil	1.90	
2nd place, silver medalist(s)	Ernesto Lagos	Chile	1.85	
3rd place, bronze medalist(s)	Alberto Bacan	Brazil	1.85	
3rd place, bronze medalist(s)	Hércules Azcune	Uruguay	1.85	
5	Geraldo de Oliveira	Brazil	1.85	
6	Carlos Puebla	Chile	1.85	
7	Pablo Barión	Argentina	1.80	
8	Carlos Vera	Chile	1.75	
9	Reinaldo Pieslinger	Argentina	1.75	
10	Pedro Listur	Uruguay	1.70	

=== Pole vault ===
9 May

Rank	Name	Nationality	Result	Notes
1st place, gold medalist(s)	Helcio da Silva	Brazil	4.00	=CR
2nd place, silver medalist(s)	Jaime Piqueras	Peru	3.90	
3rd place, bronze medalist(s)	Luis Ganoza	Peru	3.90	
4	Fausto de Souza	Brazil	3.80	
5	Luis Barja	Argentina	3.70	
6	Raimundo Rodrigues	Brazil	3.70	
7	Eduardo Montes de Oca	Argentina	3.60	
8	Cristián Raab	Chile	3.60	

=== Long jump ===
4 May

Rank	Name	Nationality	Result	Notes
1st place, gold medalist(s)	Ary de Sá	Brazil	7.39	CR
2nd place, silver medalist(s)	Carlos Vera	Chile	7.13	
3rd place, bronze medalist(s)	Ahylton da Conceição	Brazil	7.08	
4	Albino Geist	Argentina	6.89	
5	Adhemar da Silva	Brazil	6.86	
6	Boris Tomicic	Chile	6.64	
7	Bruno Witthaus	Argentina	6.42	
8	Juan Carlos Guerrero	Argentina	6.39	
9	Máximo Reyes	Peru	6.35	
10	Fermín Donazar	Uruguay	6.32	

=== Triple jump ===
10 May

Rank	Name	Nationality	Result	Notes
1st place, gold medalist(s)	Adhemar da Silva	Brazil	15.39	CR
2nd place, silver medalist(s)	Geraldo de Oliveira	Brazil	15.11	
3rd place, bronze medalist(s)	Jorgely Figueira	Brazil	14.75	
4	Alberto Betalleluz	Peru	14.0	
5	Juan Carlos Guerrero	Argentina	13.93	
6	Carlos Puebla	Chile	13.75	
7	Miroslav Gal	Argentina	13.71	
8	Fermín Donazar	Uruguay	13.64	
9	Bruno Witthaus	Argentina	13.61	
10	Enrique Vivas	Chile	12.86	

=== Shot put ===
4 May

Rank	Name	Nationality	Result	Notes
1st place, gold medalist(s)	Reidar Soerlie	Argentina	14.44	
2nd place, silver medalist(s)	Augusto Maalstein	Chile	13.86	
3rd place, bronze medalist(s)	Emilio Stelig	Brazil	13.77	
4	Rubén Scaraffia	Argentina	13.75	
5	Nadim Marreis	Brazil	13.64	
6	Leonardo Kittsteiner	Chile	13.36	
7	Alcides Dambrós	Brazil	13.23	
8	Hernán Figueroa	Chile	13.08	
9	Gerardo Mielke	Argentina	12.87	
10	Alberto Casaniego	Paraguay	?	

=== Discus throw ===
10 May

Rank	Name	Nationality	Result	Notes
1st place, gold medalist(s)	Reidar Soerlie	Argentina	47.72	CR
2nd place, silver medalist(s)	Elvio Porta	Argentina	45.27	
3rd place, bronze medalist(s)	Hernán Haddad	Chile	45.15	
4	Eduardo Julve	Peru	44.92	
5	Emilio Malchiodi	Argentina	43.45	
6	Karsten Brodersen	Chile	41.20	
7	Nadim Marreis	Brazil	41.02	
8	Augusto Maalstein	Chile	37.88	
	Walter Rodrigues	Brazil	?	
	Enrique Vázquez	Uruguay	?	

=== Hammer throw ===
6 May

Rank	Name	Nationality	Result	Notes
1st place, gold medalist(s)	Arturo Melcher	Chile	50.75	
2nd place, silver medalist(s)	Elvio Porta	Argentina	49.73	
3rd place, bronze medalist(s)	Emilio Ortiz	Argentina	49.25	
4	Manuel Etchepare	Argentina	47.25	
5	Walter Kupper	Brazil	44.85	
6	Enrique Vázquez	Uruguay	43.57	
7	Walter Rodrigues	Brazil	41.83	
8	Augusto Maalstein	Chile	41.20	
	Nadim Marreis	Brazil	?	
	Alejandro Díaz	Chile	?	

=== Javelin throw ===
3 May – old model

Rank	Name	Nationality	Result	Notes
1st place, gold medalist(s)	Ricardo Héber	Argentina	67.68	CR
2nd place, silver medalist(s)	Gerardo Mielke	Argentina	63.10	
3rd place, bronze medalist(s)	Janis Stendzeniecks	Chile	60.51	
4	Horst Walter	Argentina	60.25	
5	Fernando Ceballos	Chile	56.64	
6	Efraín Santibañez	Chile	54.27	
7	Osmar Duque	Brazil	53.00	
8	Miguel da Silva	Brazil	50.55	

=== Decathlon ===
10–11 May– 1952 tables (1985 conversions given with *)

The highest mark recorded in each event is highlighted in yellow

Rank	Athlete	Nationality	100m	LJ	SP	HJ	400m	110m H	DT	PV	JT	1500m	Points	Conv.	Notes
1st place, gold medalist(s)	Hernán Figueroa	Chile	11.4	6.60	13.31	1.73	51.9	16.4	38.55	3.50	52.03	5:15.0	6698	6295*	
2nd place, silver medalist(s)	Hernán Alzamora	Peru	11.6	6.13	10.94	1.84	53.2	15.3	31.80	2.60	48.18	5:39.4	5849	5634*	
3rd place, bronze medalist(s)	Carlos Vera	Chile	11.3	7.03	9.81	1.84	52.2	17.4	26.91	3.60	34.17	5:39.4	5844	5594*	
4	Ricardo Héber	Argentina	11.6	6.36	12.83	1.60	54.0	18.8	29.96	3.00	62.67	5:26.0	5793	5551*	
5	Aldo Ribeiro	Brazil	11.4	6.20	10.69	1.70	51.2	15.7	31.55	3.20	49.14	DNF	5774	5395*	
6	Jorge Peter	Chile	12.0	6.18	11.86	1.73	55.8	17.3	33.60	3.40	44.74	5:25.6	5680	5403*	
7	Albino Geist	Argentina	11.3	6.87	10.05	1.65	55.3	16.7	25.10	3.10	33.28	5:55.6	5233	5186*	
8	Hernán Molinas	Paraguay	12.8	5.32	8.95	1.60	65.6	21.8	25.50	3.10	38.90	6:13.3	3724	3635*	
	Raimundo Rodrigues	Brazil	12.0	6.33	11.80	1.65	53.8	16.7	34.50	3.40	51.72	DNS	DNF		
	Roberto Méndez Parry	Argentina	11.6	6.47	9.57	1.80	53.8	16.8	28.86	DNS	–	–	DNF		
	Francisco Moura	Brazil	11.2	6.83	9.68	1.80	54.2	DNS	–	–	–	–	DNF		

== Women's results ==
=== 100 metres ===
Heats – 3 May
Wind:
Heat 1: -0.4 m/s, Heat 2: -0.1 m/s, Heat 3: +0.1 m/s

Rank	Heat	Name	Nationality	Time	Notes
1	1	Helena de Menezes	Brazil	12.2	Q, CR
2	1	Lilian Buglia	Argentina	12.4	Q
3	1	Aurora Bianchi	Chile	12.9	
4	1	Beatriz Daher	Uruguay	13.2	
1	2	Julia Sánchez	Peru	12.2	Q, =CR
2	2	Betty Kretschmer	Chile	12.5	Q
3	2	Deyse de Castro	Brazil	12.6	
4	2	Ana María Fontán	Argentina	12.6	
5	2	María Perla Anza	Uruguay	12.9	
1	3	Lilian Heinz	Argentina	12.3	Q
2	3	Adriana Millard	Chile	12.7	Q
3	3	Benedita de Oliveira	Brazil	12.7	

Final – 4 May
Wind: -0.1 m/s

Rank	Lane	Name	Nationality	Time	Notes
1st place, gold medalist(s)	2	Julia Sánchez	Peru	12.2	=CR
2nd place, silver medalist(s)	6	Adriana Millard	Chile	12.4	
3rd place, bronze medalist(s)	5	Lilian Buglia	Argentina	12.4	
4	3	Helena de Menezes	Brazil	12.4	
5	4	Lilian Heinz	Argentina	12.4	
6	1	Betty Kretschmer	Chile	12.6	

=== 200 metres ===
Heats – 6 May

Rank	Heat	Name	Nationality	Time	Notes
1	1	Helena de Menezes	Brazil	26.1	Q
2	1	Teresa Carvajal	Argentina	26.4	Q
3	1	Julia Sánchez	Peru	26.4	
4	1	Aurora Bianchi	Chile	26.9	
1	2	Adriana Millard	Chile	25.8	Q
2	2	Benedita de Oliveira	Brazil	26.4	Q
3	2	Gladys Erbetta	Argentina	26.4	
1	3	Lilian Heinz	Argentina	25.7	Q, CR, NR
2	3	Deyse de Castro	Brazil	26.1	Q
3	3	Norma Díaz	Chile	26.5	

Final – 8 May

Rank	Name	Nationality	Time	Notes
1st place, gold medalist(s)	Deyse de Castro	Brazil	25.5*	CR
2nd place, silver medalist(s)	Adriana Millard	Chile	25.5*	
3rd place, bronze medalist(s)	Lilian Heinz	Argentina	25.8	
4	Teresa Carvajal	Argentina	26.3	
5	Benedita de Oliveira	Brazil	26.3	
6	Helena de Menezes	Brazil	26.7	

* after run-off, both athletes ran 25.5 in both races

=== 80 metres hurdles ===
Heats – 10 May
Wind:
Heat 1: -0.5 m/s, Heat 2: -0.3 m/s

Rank	Heat	Name	Nationality	Time	Notes
1	1	Wanda dos Santos	Brazil	11.7	Q
2	1	Luisa Pfarr	Argentina	12.2	Q
3	1	Adriana Millard	Chile	12.2	Q
4	1	Betty Kretschmer	Chile	12.7	
1	2	Marion Huber	Chile	11.9	Q
2	2	Lourdes de Abreu	Brazil	12.4	Q
3	2	Anice Burgos	Brazil	12.5	Q
4	2	Elisa Kaczmarek	Argentina	13.0	
5	2	Aida Cedeño	Ecuador	13.2	

Final – 11 May
Wind: +0.1 m/s

Rank	Name	Nationality	Time	Notes
1st place, gold medalist(s)	Wanda dos Santos	Brazil	11.7	
2nd place, silver medalist(s)	Marion Huber	Chile	11.7	
3rd place, bronze medalist(s)	Adriana Millard	Chile	12.2	
4	Lourdes de Abreu	Brazil	12.2	
5	Luisa Pfarr	Argentina	12.4	
6	Anice Burgos	Brazil	13.0	

=== 4 × 100 metres relay ===
11 May

Rank	Nation	Competitors	Time	Notes
1st place, gold medalist(s)	Argentina	Lilian Heinz, Lilian Buglia, Gladys Erbetta, Ana María Fontán	48.8	CR
2nd place, silver medalist(s)	Brazil	Benedita de Oliveira, Lucila Pini, Deyse de Castro, Helena de Menezes	48.8	
3rd place, bronze medalist(s)	Chile	Aurora Bianchi, Betty Kretschmer, Norma Díaz, Adriana Millard	49.1	
4	Uruguay	María Perla Anza, Beatriz Daher, Delia Díaz, Zulma Picos	52.9	

=== High jump ===
10 May

Rank	Name	Nationality	Result	Notes
1st place, gold medalist(s)	Elizabeth Müller	Brazil	1.53	
2nd place, silver medalist(s)	Deyse de Castro	Brazil	1.53	
3rd place, bronze medalist(s)	María Cañas	Chile	1.45	
4	Luisa García	Argentina	1.45	
5	Gerda Martin	Chile	1.45	
6	Theodora Breitkopf	Brazil	1.40	
6	Elisa Kaczmarek	Argentina	1.40	
8	Julia Alfisi	Argentina	1.40	
8	Adriana Millard	Chile	1.40	
8	Delia Díaz	Uruguay	1.40	

=== Long jump ===
4 May

Rank	Name	Nationality	Result	Notes
1st place, gold medalist(s)	Gladys Erbetta	Argentina	5.52	
2nd place, silver medalist(s)	Adriana Millard	Chile	5.39	
3rd place, bronze medalist(s)	Wanda dos Santos	Brazil	5.26	
4	Julia Sánchez	Peru	5.24	
5	Lilian Buglia	Argentina	5.22	
6	Betty Kretschmer	Chile	5.22	
7	Lourdes de Abreu	Brazil	5.12	
8	Lisa Peter	Chile	5.09	
9	Helena de Menezes	Brazil	5.08	
10	Elena Hoss	Argentina	5.00	

=== Shot put ===
8 May

Rank	Name	Nationality	Result	Notes
1st place, gold medalist(s)	Ingeborg Mello	Argentina	11.48	
2nd place, silver medalist(s)	Ingeborg Pfüller	Argentina	11.35	
3rd place, bronze medalist(s)	Ilse Gerdau	Brazil	11.25	
4	Julia Huapaya	Peru	10.94	
5	Vera Trezoitko	Brazil	10.60	
6	Elizabeth Müller	Brazil	10.57	
7	Gertrudes Vázquez	Chile	10.39	
8	Nelly Wiederhold	Chile	10.17	
9	Nélida Rionegro	Argentina	9.80	
10	Ursula Holle	Chile	9.65	
	Orfilia Costa	Uruguay	?	

=== Discus throw ===
3 May

Rank	Name	Nationality	Result	Notes
1st place, gold medalist(s)	Ingeborg Mello	Argentina	40.14	CR
2nd place, silver medalist(s)	Ingeborg Pfüller	Argentina	40.07	
3rd place, bronze medalist(s)	Ilse Gerdau	Brazil	36.78	
4	Babette Zoet	Brazil	36.72	
5	Daisy Hofmann	Chile	35.43	
6	Julia Huapaya	Peru	35.29	
7	Erica Troemel	Chile	33.31	
8	Noemia Assumpcão	Brazil	32.85	
9	Zulema Bonaparte	Argentina	31.92	
10	Edith Thomas	Chile	28.72	

=== Javelin throw ===
11 May – old model

Rank	Name	Nationality	Result	Notes
1st place, gold medalist(s)	Gerda Martín	Chile	39.16	CR
2nd place, silver medalist(s)	Edith Thomas	Chile	38.80	
3rd place, bronze medalist(s)	Estrella Puente	Uruguay	37.89	
4	Anneliese Schmidt	Brazil	37.38	NR
5	Carmen Venegas	Chile	35.74	
6	Babette Zoet	Brazil	34.23	
