= Pedro Listur =

Uruguayan athlete

Personal information
- Full name: Pedro María Listur González
- Nationality: Uruguayan
- Born: 6 April 1922 Trinidad, Uruguay
- Died: 5 September 2004 (aged 82) Montevideo, Uruguay

Sport
- Sport: Athletics
- Event: High jump

Pedro María Listur González (6 April 1922 – 5 September 2004) was a Uruguayan athlete. He competed in the men's high jump at the 1948 Summer Olympics.

His personal best in the event was 1.94 metres set in 1948.

== International competitions ==
Year	Competition	Venue	Position	Event	Notes
Representing Uruguay
1945	South American Championships	Montevideo, Uruguay	1st	High jump	1.85 m
1947	South American Championships	Rio de Janeiro, Brazil	6th	High jump	1.80 m
1948	Olympic Games	London, United Kingdom	21st (q)	High jump	1.84 m
1948	South American Championships (unofficial)	La Paz, Bolivia	2nd	High jump	1.85 m
1948	South American Championships (unofficial)	La Paz, Bolivia	3rd	Triple jump	13.72 m
1950	South American Championships (unofficial)	Montevideo, Uruguay	3rd	High jump	1.85 m
1952	South American Championships	Buenos Aires, Argentina	10th	High jump	1.70 m
