= 1948 South American Championships in Athletics (unofficial) =

Unofficial South American Championships in Athletics
- Dates: 12–17 October
- Host city: La Paz, Bolivia
- Level: Senior
- Events: 25
- Participation: 4 nations

Unofficial South American Championships in Athletics (V Campeonato Extraordinario de Atletismo) were held in La Paz, Bolivia between 12 and 17 October 1948. The event was held in celebration of the 400th It event took place at the altitude of over 3,600 metres above sea level which is said to have an effect on athletic performance, positive for some event and negative for others.

Women's competition was dominated by Bolivian athlete Julia Iriarte winning five gold, one silver and one bronze medal.

== Medal summary ==
Medal winners are published.

=== Men ===
Event	Gold		Silver		Bronze	
100 metres	Gerardo Salazar (PER)	10.6A	Miguel León Pizarro (PER)	10.7A	Rodolfo López (CHI)	11.0A
200 metres	Gerardo Salazar (PER)	21.8A	Rodolfo López (CHI)	22.4A	Carlos Ribeiro (URU)	23.1A
400 metres	Eduardo Laca (PER)	50.5A	Reinaldo Martín (CHI)	50.9A	Sergio Guzmán (CHI)	51.0A
800 metres	Antero Mongrut (PER)	2:04.3A	Rogelio Gómez (PER)	2:04.5A	Sergio Guzmán (CHI)	2:05.1A
110 metres hurdles	Hernán Alzamora (PER)	14.8A	Edmundo Ohaco (CHI)	15.3A	Ivo Buratovich (BOL)	15.4A
200 metres hurdles	Eduardo Laca (PER)	25.6A	Carlos Ribeiro (URU)	26.1A	Sergio Guzmán (CHI)	26.5A
4 × 100 metres relay	Peru; Gerardo Salazar ? ? ?	42.8A	Chile; Sergio Guzmán; Carlos Vera; Rodolfo López; Mateo Durruty	43.2A	Uruguay	44.4A
4 × 400 metres relay	Chile; Sergio Guzmán; Ramis ? Reinaldo Martín	3:26.3A	Peru; Carlos Bahamondes ? Eduardo Laca; Antero Mongrut	3:26.4A	Uruguay; Carlos Ribeiro ? Saravia; Rodríguez	3:31.2A
High jump	Hércules Azcune (URU)	1.90A	Pedro Listur (URU)	1.85A	Alfredo Jadresic (CHI)	1.80A
Pole vault	Luis Ganoza (PER)	3.70A	Jaime Piqueras (PER)	3.70A	Carlos Vera (CHI)	3.60A
Long jump	Carlos Vera (CHI)	7.05A	Máximo Reyes (PER)	6.84A	Hércules Azcune (URU)	6.71A
Triple jump	Carlos Vera (CHI)	14.65A	Máximo Reyes (PER)	14.27A	Pedro Listur (URU)	13.72A
Shot put	Hernán Figueroa (CHI)	13.50A	Ivo Buratovich (BOL)	11.40A	Edmundo Ohaco (CHI)	11.30A
Discus throw	Hércules Azcune (URU)	38.24A	Atilio Accinelli (PER)	36.11A	Hernán Figueroa (CHI)	35.74A
Hammer throw	Edmundo Zúñiga (CHI)	45.28A	Alberto Peirano (PER)	39.96A	Atilio Accinelli (PER)	39.10A
Javelin throw	Armin Nevermann (CHI)	55.93A	Edmundo Ohaco (CHI)	52.87A	Hernán Alzamora (PER)	44.75A

=== Women ===
Event	Gold		Silver		Bronze	
100 metres	Julia Iriarte (BOL)	13.1A	Raquel Gamarra (PER)	13.2A	Elena Amaya (BOL)	13.3A
200 metres	Julia Sánchez (PER)	26.1A	Elena Amaya (BOL)	27.2A	Julia Huapaya (PER)	27.9A
80 metres hurdles	Julia Iriarte (BOL)	12.1A	Emma Banzer (BOL)	13.8A	Hilda Yamasaki (PER)	14.7A
4 × 100 metres relay	Peru; Raquel Gamarra; Julia Sánchez; Julia Huapaya; Hilda Yamasaki	51.6A	Bolivia; Julia Iriarte; Carmela Antezana; Laura Ortiz; Elena Amaya	52.5A	Only two participating teams	
High jump	Carmela Antezana (BOL)	1.45A	Julia Sánchez (PER)	1.40A	Julia Iriarte (BOL)	1.40A
Long jump	Julia Sánchez (PER)	5.04A	Julia Iriarte (BOL)	5.01A	Hilda Yamasaki (PER)	4.85A
Shot put	Julia Iriarte (BOL)	10.94A	Julia Huapaya (PER)	10.11A	Raquel Gamarra (PER)	8.22A
Discus throw	Julia Iriarte (BOL)	33.66A	Julia Huapaya (PER)	33.54A	Raquel Gamarra (PER)	24.33A
Javelin throw	Julia Iriarte (BOL)	32.16A	Raquel Gamarra (PER)	26.28A	Laura Ortiz (BOL)	18.50A

== Medal table (unofficial) ==
* Host nation (Bolivia)

Rank	Nation	Gold	Silver	Bronze	Total
1	Peru (PER)	10	13	7	30
2	Chile (CHI)	6	5	8	19
3	Bolivia (BOL)*	6	4	4	14
4	Uruguay (URU)	2	2	5	9
Totals (4 entries)		24	24	24	72
