= Mario Rosas (athlete) =

Colombian sprinter (born 1927)

Personal information
- Nationality: Colombian
- Born: 14 January 1927 (age 99) Bogotá, Colombia

Sport
- Sport: Track and Field
- Events: 400 metres and 400 meters hurdles

Mario Rosas Ruiz (born 14 January 1927) is a Colombian former sprinter. He competed in the men's 400 metres and 400 meters hurdles at the 1948 Summer Olympics.
