= Bolivarian Games =

Regional multi-sport event in South America

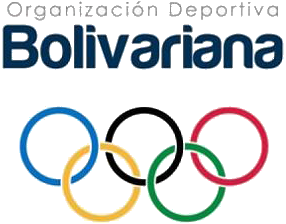
- Type: Multi-sport event
- Organising body: ODEBO
- Founded: 1938; 88 years ago
- Region: South America (Andean states)
- Nations: 11 (2022)
- Related: Pan American Games
- Website: odebo.org/juegos

The Bolivarian Games (Spanish: Juegos Bolivarianos, full name Juegos Deportivos Bolivarianos) are a regional multi-sport event held in honor of Simón Bolívar, and organized by the Bolivarian Sports Organization (Organización Deportiva Bolivariana, ODEBO). The event is open to athletes from Bolivia, Colombia, Ecuador, Panama, Peru, the Dominican Republic, Puerto Rico and Venezuela. In 2010, the ODEBO decided to include Chile as the seventh member of ODEBO. Except Panama and the Dominican Republic, all other participating countries are Andean states.

== History ==
The first Games were held in 1938 in Bogotá, Colombia for the city's 400th anniversary. They have since been held irregularly, but every four years since 1973, with the most recent edition in Valledupar, Colombia in 2022. Inspired by the events of 1936 Summer Olympics in Berlin, Alberto Nariño Cheyne was the key designer of the idea of a Games to foster unity among the Bolivarian countries through the means of sport.

Following the first Games, the Bolivarian Sports Organization was formed as a sub-organisation of the Pan American Sports Organization by six founding members from the respective countries – Jorge Rodríguez Hurtado (Bolivia), Alberto Nariño Cheyne (Colombia), Galo Plaza Lasso (Ecuador), Luis Saavedra (Panama), Alfredo Hohagen Diez Canseco (Peru) and Julio Bustamante (Venezuela).

In terms of medals, Peru was dominant in the early years of the competition but Venezuela has consistently been the most successful country since the 1960s.

A detailed history of the early editions of the Bolivarian Games between 1938 and 1989 was published in a book written (in Spanish) by José Gamarra Zorrilla, former president of the Bolivian Olympic Committee, and first president (1976-1982) of ODESUR.

== Summary ==
=== Games ===
Year	Ed.	Host city	Host country (Note: As recognized by the IOC.)	Opened by	Period	Nat.	Athl.	Sports	Events	Winner
1938	1	Bogotá	Colombia	Alfonso López Pumarejo	6–22 Aug	6		17	84	Peru
1948	2	Lima	Peru	José Luís Bustamante y Rivero	25 Dec – 8 Jan	6		22	112	Peru
1951	3	Caracas	Venezuela	Germán Suárez Flamerich	5–21 Dec	6		22	108	Peru
1961	4	Barranquilla	Colombia	Alberto Lleras Camargo	3–16 Dec	5		12	145	Venezuela
1965	5	Quito	Ecuador	Ramón Castro Jijón	20 Nov – 6 Dec	6		20	142	Venezuela
1970	6	Maracaibo	Venezuela	Rafael Caldera	23 Aug – 6 Sep	6		17	189	Venezuela
1973	7	Panama City	Panama	Demetrio Basilio Lakas	17 Feb – 3 Mar	5		16	173	Venezuela
1977	8	La Paz	Bolivia	Hugo Banzer	15–29 Oct	6		16	185	Venezuela
1981	9	Barquisimeto	Venezuela	Luís Herrera Campins	4–14 Dec	6		18	233	Venezuela
1985	10	Cuenca	Ecuador	León Febres Cordero	9–18 Nov	6		20	230	Venezuela
1989	11	Maracaibo	Venezuela	Jaime Lusinchi	14–25 Jan	6		20	262	Venezuela
1993	12	Cochabamba	Bolivia	Jaime Paz Zamora	24 Apr – 2 May	6		19	275	Venezuela
1997	13	Arequipa	Peru	Alberto Fujimori	17–26 Oct	6		22	318	Venezuela
2001	14	Ambato	Ecuador	Roberto Hanze	7–16 Sep	6		29	377	Venezuela
2005	15	Armenia and Pereira	Colombia	Álvaro Uribe	12–21 Aug	6		28	415	Venezuela
2009	16	Sucre	Bolivia	Evo Morales	15–26 Nov	6		30	435	Venezuela
2013	17	Trujillo	Peru	Ollanta Humala	16–30 Nov	11		44	562	Colombia
2017	18	Santa Marta	Colombia	Clara Luz Roldán	11–25 Nov	11		34	469	Colombia
2022	19	Valledupar	Colombia	Clara Luz Roldán	24 Jun – 5 July	11		32	389	Colombia
2024	20	Ayacucho	Peru	Dina Boluarte	29 Nov-8 Dec	10		25	159	Peru
2025	21	Ayacucho and Lima	Peru	Renzo Manyari	22 Nov- 7 Dec	17		47	480	Colombia
2029	22	Cúcuta	Colombia	TBA	TBA	TBA	TBA	TBA	TBA	TBA

=== Beach Games ===
Year	Games	Host City	Host Country	Opened by	Dates	Nations	Events	Top medalling nation
2012	1	Lima	Peru	Patricia Salas	1–11 Nov	10	64	Peru
2014	2	Huanchaco	Peru	Gloria Montenegro Figueroa	3–12 Dec	11	71	Venezuela
2016	3	Iquique	Chile		24 Nov-3 Dec	11	81	Chile
2019	4	Vargas	Venezuela	Cancelled				

=== Youth Games ===
Year	Games	Host City	Host Country	Opened by	Dates	Nations	Events	Top medalling nation
2024	1	Sucre	Bolivia	Luis Arce	4–14 Apr	7	234	Colombia
2027	2	Caracas	Venezuela	TBA	2- 17 November 2027	TBA	TBA	TBA

== Sports ==
The following table was compiled based on information extracted from a variety of sources. It should be considered as incomplete.

Disciplines from the same sport are grouped under the same color:

Aquatics – Cycling – Football – Gymnastics – Underwater sports – Volleyball - Basketball

Sport (Discipline)	Body		38	47	51	61	65	70	73	77	81	85	89	93	97	01	05	09	13	17	22
Sport (Discipline)	World	South America	38	47	51	61	65	70	73	77	81	85	89	93	97	01	05	09	13	17	22
Diving	AQUA	ASUA	X	X	X	X	X	X	X	X	X	X	X				X		X	X	
Open water swimming	AQUA	ASUA																	X	X	X
Swimming	AQUA	ASUA	X	X	X	X	X	X	X	X	X	X	X	X	X	X	X	X	X	X	X
Synchronized swimming	AQUA	ASUA											X						X	X	X
Water polo	AQUA	ASUA	X	X	X				X	X									X	X	X
Archery	WA	AAF														X	X	X	X	X	X
Athletics	World Athletics	CONSUDATLE	X	X	X	X	X	X	X	X	X	X	X	X	X	X	X	X	X	X	X
Badminton	BWF	BPA																X	X	X	X
Baseball	WBSC	WBSC Americas	X	X	X	X	X	X	X		X	X	X			X		X	X	X	X
Softball	WBSC	WBSC Americas						X	X		X		X		X	X		X	X	X	X
Basketball	FIBA	FIBA Americas	X	X	X	X	X	X	X	X	X	X	X	X	X	X	X	X	X	X	X
3x3 Basketball	FIBA	FIBA Americas																			X
Basque Pelota/ Pelota Nacional	FIPV		X		X		X												X		
Billiards	WCBS	CPB		X	X											X	X	X	X		
Bodybuilding	IFBB	IFBBSud America														X					
Bola Criollas	FIB				X																
Bowling	IBF	PABCON							X	X	X	X	X		X	X	X	X	X	X	X
Boxing	World Boxing	AMBC	X	X	X	X	X	X	X	X	X	X	X	X	X	X	X	X	X	X	X
Equestrianism													X								
Canoeing	PW	COPAC														X	X	X	X	X	X
Chess	FIDE	CCA	X	X	X		X					X				X			X		
Climbing	World Climbing														X	X			X		
Coleo					X																
BMX racing	UCI	COPACI															X	X	X	X	X
Mountain biking	UCI	COPACI															X	X	X	X	X
Road cycling	UCI	COPACI	X	X	X	X	X	X	X	X	X	X	X	X	X	X	X	X	X	X	X
Track cycling	UCI	COPACI	X	X	X	X	X	X	X	X	X	X	X	X	X	X	X	X	X	X	X
Equestrian	FEI	PAEC	X	X	X		X	X		X		X	X	X	X	X	X	X	X	X	X
Fencing	FIE	CPE	X	X	X	X	X	X	X	X	X		X	X	X	X	X	X	X	X	X
Field hockey	FIH	PAHF																	X		
Football	FIFA	CONMEBOL	X	X	X	X	X	X	X	X	X	X		X	X	X	X	X	X	X	X
Futsal	FIFA	CONMEBOL																X	X	X	X
Golf	IGF	FSG	X	X	X		X												X	X	X
Artistic gymnastics	World Gymnastics	CONSUGI					X	X	X	X	X	X	X	X	X	X	X	X	X	X	X
Rhythmic gymnastics	World Gymnastics	CONSUGI													X	X	X	X	X	X	X
Trampoline	World Gymnastics	CONSUGI																		X	X
Handball	IHF	SCAHC																	X	X	X
Judo	IJF	PJC					X	X	X	X	X	X	X	X	X	X	X	X	X	X	X
Karate	WKF	PKF											X	X	X	X	X	X	X	X	X
Modern pentathlon	UIPM				X																
Racquetball	IRF	PARC												X		X	X	X	X	X	
Roller speed skating	WS	CPRS															X		X	X	
Rowing	FISA															X		X	X	X	X
Rugby	World Rugby	CONSUR																	X	X	X
Sailing	WS	SASC					X					X	X			X	X	X	X	X	X
Shooting	ISSF	CAT	X	X	X	X	X	X	X	X	X	X	X	X	X	X	X	X	X	X	X
Squash	World Squash	FPS														X	X	X	X	X	X
Surfing	ISA	APAS														X		X	X		
Table tennis	ITTF	LATTU			X		X				X	X	X	X	X	X	X	X	X	X	X
Taekwondo	WTF	PATU										X	X	X	X	X	X	X	X	X	X
Tennis	World Tennis	COSAT	X	X	X	X	X	X		X	X	X	X	X	X	X	X	X	X	X	X
Triathlon	TRI	PATCO														X	X	X	X	X	X
Finswimming	CMAS																		X		
Freediving	CMAS																		X		
Spearfishing	CMAS																		X		
Beach volleyball	FIVB	CSV														X	X	X		X	X
Volleyball	FIVB	CSV	X	X	X		X	X	X	X	X	X	X	X	X	X	X	X	X	X	X
Water skiing	IWWF	IWWF Pan Am															X		X	X	X
Weightlifting	IWF	PAWC	X	X	X	X	X	X	X	X	X	X	X	X	X	X	X	X	X	X	X
Wrestling	UWW	CPLA	X	X	X	X	X	X	X	X	X	X	X	X	X	X	X	X	X	X	X
Wushu	IWUF	PAWF																	X		
Total sports			16	15	16	12	20	17	16	16	19	18	19	18	21	30	28	30	44	45	43

The sport of cricket is set to debut in the 2025 Bolivarian Games.

== Nations ==
Andean Community Member states (South America except Mercosur)

=== Core (6) ===
ODEBO (Organización Deportiva Bolivariana) / Andean Community (Andean States):

- Bolivia
- Colombia
- Ecuador
- Panama
- Peru
- Venezuela

=== Invited Nations (5) ===
The invited countries are not members of ODEBO but they are invited since 2013

==== Central America ====
- El Salvador
- Guatemala

==== Caribbean ====
- Dominican Republic

==== South America ====
- Chile
- Paraguay

== Members ==
ODEBO Members of the National Olympic Committees include:

Name	Olympic Committee	Admitted in
Bolivia	Bolivian Olympic Committee	1938
Chile	Chilean Olympic Committee	2010
Colombia	Colombian Olympic Committee	1938
Ecuador	Ecuadorian National Olympic Committee	1938
Panama	Panama Olympic Committee	1938
Peru	Peruvian Olympic Committee	1938
Venezuela	Venezuelan Olympic Committee	1938

== Medals ==
=== Games (1938-2024) ===
The total medal count for all the Games until 2024 is tabulated below. This table is sorted by the number of gold medals won by each country. The number of silver medals is taken into consideration next, and then the number of bronze medals. Chile, the Dominican Republic, El Salvador, Guatemala, and Paraguay started competing since the 2013 Bolivarian Games.

Bolivarian Games Medal Count
Rank	Nation	Gold	Silver	Bronze	Total
1	Venezuela	1877	1585	1218	4680
2	Colombia	1606	1416	1162	4184
3	Peru	670	753	962	2385
4	Ecuador	451	710	1079	2240
5	Panama	196	199	341	736
6	Chile	154	169	240	563
7	Bolivia	113	199	440	752
8	Dominican Republic	60	59	129	248
9	Guatemala	48	74	106	228
10	Paraguay	23	32	36	91
11	El Salvador	15	22	26	63
Total		5213	5218	5739	16170

==== All time records ====
- Colombia holds the record for the highest number of gold medals won for a country in a single edition, obtaining 213 gold medals at the 2017 Bolivarian Games in Santa Marta as the host nation.
- Colombia holds the record for the biggest lead of gold medals to second place, obtaining a margin of 119 gold medals over Venezuela in Santa Marta 2017.
- Colombia holds the record for the biggest lead of total medals to second place, 168 medals more than Venezuela in 2017.
- Venezuela holds the record for the highest number of total medals obtained in a single edition with 476 in the 2009 Bolivarian Games in Sucre.

=== Beach Games (2012-2016) ===
Bolivarian Games Medal Count
Rank	Nation	Gold	Silver	Bronze	Total
1	Venezuela	58	50	46	154
2	Chile	48	46	38	132
3	Peru	48	35	47	130
4	Colombia	30	24	29	83
5	Ecuador	19	40	37	96
6	Guatemala	6	3	6	15
7	Paraguay	3	9	9	21
8	El Salvador	3	6	5	14
9	Dominican Republic	1	3	6	10
10	Panama	0	0	2	2
11	Bolivia	0	0	0	0
Total		216	216	215	647

=== Youth Games (2024) ===
Rank	NOC	Gold	Silver	Bronze	Total
1	Colombia	73	51	55	179
2	Venezuela	63	48	46	157
3	Chile	30	40	47	117
4	Ecuador	25	32	32	89
5	Peru	20	26	54	100
6	Bolivia	9	19	39	67
7	Panama	7	7	11	25
8	Team ODEBO	0	1	0	1
Totals (8 entries)		227	224	284	735

Source: I Bolivarian Youth Games Sucre 2024 – Medal table

== Sport in Americas ==
- Sport in North America
- Sport in South America

== See also ==
- Andean Community
- Latin America
- Southern Cone
- Pan American Games
- Parapan American Games
- Central American and Caribbean Games
- Central American Games
- South American Games
- Ibero American Games
- Caribbean Games
- ALBA Games
- American frontier
- The Guianas
- Caribbean South America
- Caribbean Free Trade Association
- Central American Integration System
- Community of Latin American and Caribbean States
- Mercosur
- Union of South American Nations
- Market access
- Free trade area
- Trade bloc
- Free Trade Area of the Americas
