= Édgar Diminich =

Ecudaorian sailor (born 1991)

Personal information
- Full name: Édgar Andres Diminich Orellana
- Nationality: Ecuador
- Born: 29 April 1991 (age 35)

Sailing career
- Sport: Sailing
- Club: Salinas Yacht Club
Medal record
Sailing
Representing Ecuador
Optimist World Championships
Bronze medal – third place	2006 Montevideo	Optimist
Sunfish World Championships
Silver medal – second place	2016 Cartagena	Sunfish
Bolivarian Games
Gold medal – first place	2009 Sucre	Sunfish
Gold medal – first place	2013 Trujillo	Snipe
Bolivarian Beach Games
Bronze medal – third place	2012 Lima	Snipe
Silver medal – second place	2014 Huanchaco	Snipe

Édgar Diminich (born April 29, 1991) is a world class sailor from Ecuador.

He began sailing Optimists and became Southamerican champion in 2004 when he was 12 years old. Two years later, in 2006, he won the bronze medal at the Optimist World Championship.

Next, he was the Laser Radial Cressy Champion in Florida in 2008, the Laser National Champion in Ecuador in 2009, and he placed 4th in the Laser South Americans in Brazil in 2010.

In 2012 he won the Snipe North American Championship as a crew of Raúl Ríos and in 2016 he won the Snipe Western Hemisphere & Orient Championship as a skipper, with Jaime Flores. In 2016, he also was second at the Sunfish Worlds.

== Bolivarian Games ==
- Gold medal at Sucre 2009 in Sunfish.
- Gold medal at Trujillo 2013 in Snipe with Juan José Ferretti Ramírez.

== Bolivarian Beach Games ==
- Bronze medal at Lima 2012 in Snipe with Juan José Ferretti Ramírez.
- Silver medal at Huanchaco 2014 in Snipe with Jaime Santos.
