= Isabel Aco =

Peruvian karateka (born 1994)

Personal information
- Full name: Isabel Mallory Aco Bravo
- Born: 8 January 1994 (age 32)

Sport
- Country: Peru
- Sport: Karate
- Weight class: +68 kg
- Events: Kumite; Team kumite
Medal record
Women's karate
Representing Peru
Pan American Games
Bronze medal – third place	2019 Lima	Kumite +68 kg
South American Games
Gold medal – first place	2018 Cochabamba	Kumite +68 kg
Bolivarian Games
Gold medal – first place	2013 Trujillo	Kumite +68 kg
Silver medal – second place	2013 Trujillo	Team kumite
World Games
Bronze medal – third place	2013 Cali	Kumite +68 kg

Isabel Mallory Aco Bravo (born 8 January 1994) is a Peruvian karateka. She won one of the bronze medals in the women's kumite +68 kg event at the 2019 Pan American Games held in Lima, Peru.

== Career ==
At the 2013 World Games held in Cali, Colombia, Aco won the bronze medal in the women's kumite +68 kg event. In the same year, she also won the gold medal in the women's kumite +68 kg event at the 2013 Bolivarian Games held in Trujillo, Peru.

In 2018, Aco won the gold medal in the women's kumite +68 kg event at the South American Games held in Cochabamba, Bolivia. In 2021, she competed at the World Olympic Qualification Tournament held in Paris, France hoping to qualify for the 2020 Summer Olympics in Tokyo, Japan.

== Achievements ==
Year	Competition	Venue	Rank	Event
2013	World Games	Cali, Colombia	3rd	Kumite +68 kg
2013	Bolivarian Games	Trujillo, Peru	1st	Kumite +68 kg
2013	Bolivarian Games	Trujillo, Peru	2nd	Team kumite
2018	South American Games	Cochabamba, Bolivia	1st	Kumite +68 kg
2019	Pan American Games	Lima, Peru	3rd	Kumite +68 kg
