= Anggie Avegno =

Ecuadorian canoeist (born 1996)

Personal information
- Nickname: Gita
- Born: Anggie Nicole Avegno Salazar; 8 June 1996 (age 30) Guayaquil, Ecuador
- Height: 1.53 m (5.0 ft)
- Other interests: Football

Sport
- Country: Ecuador
- Sport: Canoe sprint
- University team: University of Guayaquil
- Coached by: Sebastian de Cesare
Medal record
Representing Ecuador
Women's canoe sprint
Pan American Games
Silver medal – second place	2015 Toronto	C-1 200 m
South American Games
Gold medal – first place	2014 Santiago	C-1 200 m
Bronze medal – third place	2018 Cochabamba	C-1 200 m
Bronze medal – third place	2018 Cochabamba	C-2 500 m
Bronze medal – third place	2022 Asunción	C-2 500 m
Bolivarian Games
Gold medal – first place	2013 Trujillo	C-1 200 m
Gold medal – first place	2013 Trujillo	C-1 500 m
Gold medal – first place	2017 Santa Marta	C-1 200 m
Gold medal – first place	2022 Valledupar	C-1 200 m
Silver medal – second place	2017 Santa Marta	C-2 500 m
Silver medal – second place	2022 Valledupar	C-2 500 m
Bolivarian Beach Games
Gold medal – first place	2016 Iquique	C-1 200 m
Bronze medal – third place	2016 Iquique	C-1 1000 m
Junior and U23 World Championships
Silver medal – second place	2013 Welland	Junior C-1 200 m
Silver medal – second place	2014 Szeged	Junior C-1 200 m
Bronze medal – third place	2015 Montemor-o-Velho	U23 C-2 200 m
Bronze medal – third place	2016 Minsk	U23 C-1 200 m
Bronze medal – third place	2016 Minsk	U23 C-1 500 m
Bronze medal – third place	2016 Minsk	U23 C-2 200 m

Anggie Nicole Avegno Salazar (born 8 June 1996) is an Ecuadorian canoeist for the University of Guayaquil.

== Biography ==
Anggie Avegno was born on 8 June 1996 in Guayaquil, Ecuador. She took an interest in canoeing after watching observing a group of people canoeing in the Good Friday Park in the south of Guayaquil with her parents. She studied at the College of Santa María de los Ángeles.

In 2012, under the direction of Ossian Frydson, Avegno placed 4th in boating in the World Cup, in that year held in Russia. That same year, she became Pan-American and Junior World boating champion.

In 2013, she became the junior vice-world champion and won two bronze medals at the World Cups in Hungary and the Czech Republic in 2013 and a gold medal at the 2013 Bolivarian Games in canoeing. The next year, Avegno won the South American championship in C-1200 meters, beating Chilean Nancy Millán and Valdenise Conceição of Brazil for the gold medal with a time of 47 seconds and 351 thousandths in the X Games held in Santiago, Chile. On 20 July of that year, she won the silver medal at the U-23 World Canoe Championship in Hungary.

In April 2015, Avegno obtained one of each type of medal at the South American Rafting competition held at the Yawarkucha in Ecuador. She won a gold medal in the Under 21 category of the C1-1000 meters category (5 min. 11.09 sec.), silver in C1-500 meters (2 min. 27.56 sec.), and bronze in C2-500 meters (2 min. 6.43 sec.) with Mía Friend.

Avegno and Friend would also win gold medals in C2-500 meters at the 2015 World Cup in Boulogne.
