= Sofía Gómez =

Freediver and civil engineer

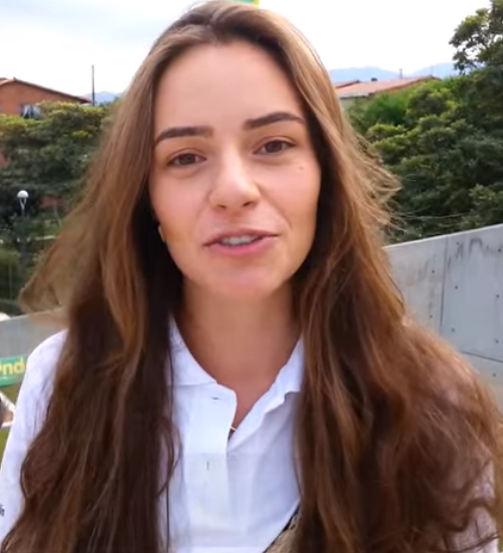

Personal information
- Full name: Sofía Gómez Uribe
- Born: 15 April 1992 (age 34)
- Education: National University of Colombia at Medellín

Sport
- Sport: Freediving

Achievements and titles
- Regional finals: 2013 Bolivarian Games
Medal record
Representing Colombia
Women's freediving
Bolivarian Games
Gold medal – first place	2013 Trujillo	Individual dynamic apnea

Sofía Gómez Uribe (Latin American Spanish: [soˈfia ˈɣomes uˈɾiβe]; born 15 April 1992) is a Colombian freediver and civil engineer. She holds six national records in three different freediving disciplines ("depth apneas"), a Bolivarian Games record set at the 2013 Games in Trujillo, Peru, that won her a gold medal in the Women's individual dynamic apnea free-diving event, and a Pan-American record in dynamic apnea with equipment.

== Personal life ==
Gómez was born in Pereira, Risaralda, Colombia. Her parents Francisco and Mónica are from Santa Marta. Gómez attended the Immaculate Heart of Mary School. In 2001, she took up synchronised swimming and in 2002, she took up finswimming. After finishing high school, Gómez moved to Bogotá for a year and now lives in Medellín. In 2016, she graduated from the National University of Colombia at Medellín, and she now works as a civil engineer. In 2017, Gómez set up a fundraising campaign to help people in Dominica affected by Hurricane Maria. In 2020, Gómez apologised for racist and classist comments made on Twitter between 2010 and 2011.

Goméz is in a relationship with chef Juan Diego Vanegas. The couple announced their engagement in June 2021, and married in March 2022.

== Career ==
In 2013, a friend encouraged Gómez to take up freediving, a sport that involves underwater diving without breathing apparatus. After some training, she managed to dive 40 metres (130 ft), and decided to take up the sport professionally. In her first year, Gómez attempted to break the Pan-American record for dynamic apnea, but became unconscious after swimming for 180 metres (590 ft).

In 2014, she broke the dynamic apnea record by swimming for 195.76 metres (642.3 ft) in Chiapas, Mexico. In 2016, she broke the Pan-American records for the constant weight with fins and free immersion events at the Vertical Blue competition.

In 2017, she broke the CMAS Constant Weight Bi-Fins freediving world record after descending 83.1 metres (273 ft) in a time of 2 minutes and 43 seconds, beating Alenka Artnik's previous record of 82 metres (269 ft) set the previous year in Kaş, Turkey. Two days later, she broke her own world record by diving 84 metres (276 ft). At the 2017 CMAS World Championship, Artnik and Ukrainian Nataliia Zharkova both dived 85 metres (279 ft).

In 2018, Gómez participated in a scientific study to measure her body's functions in extreme conditions. In September 2018, Gómez set a new women's world record with a Constant Weight with bi-fins (CWT) dive to 86 metres (282 ft). The record was set under World Underwater Federation (CMAS) rules at the Kas Baska freediving competition in advance of the CMAS World Championships.

In 2021, Gómez returned to freediving, having taken a break due to a medical issue and the COVID-19 pandemic. She was sponsored by Grupo Argos. She came third at the 2022 Vertical Blue event.
