= Triathlon at the 2015 Pan American Games – Qualification =

== Qualification system ==
A total of 70 triathletes (35 men and 35 women) will qualify to compete at the games. A nation may enter a maximum of six athletes (three per gender). Triathletes will qualify through various qualification events and rankings in 2014 and 2015. The host nation Canada, automatically qualifies a full team of six athletes. There will also be three wild card spots per gender awarded. An athlete can only qualify one quota spot for their country.

21 slots per gender will be awarded using the ITU Points list. Athletes must be in the top 250 of the said list to receive a quota. If there isn't enough athletes in the top 250 to meet the quota, the spots will be transferred to wild cards.

== Qualification timeline ==
Event	Date	Venue
2014 South American Games	March 8–9, 2014	(Chile) Santiago
2014 Pan American Sports Festival	September 7, 2014	(Mexico) Monterrey
2014 Central American and Caribbean Games	November 15–16, 2014	(Mexico) Veracruz
2015 South American Championship	January 16–18, 2015	(Argentina) La Paz
2015 Central American and Caribbean Championship	February 22, 2015	(Colombia) Barranquilla
ITU Points list	April 30, 2015	–

== Qualification summary ==
NOC	Men	Women	Total
Argentina	3	3	6
Aruba	1		1
Barbados	1		1
Belize	1		1
Bermuda		1	1
Bolivia	1		1
Brazil	3	3	6
Canada	3	3	6
Chile	3	3	6
Colombia	1		1
Costa Rica	1	1	2
Cuba	1	3	4
Dominican Republic		1	1
Ecuador	3	3	6
Guatemala	1	2	3
Mexico	3	3	6
Nicaragua	1		1
Panama	1		1
Paraguay		1	1
Peru		3	3
Puerto Rico	1	2	3
United States	3	3	6
Uruguay	1		1
Venezuela	2		2
Total: 24 NOCs	35	35	70

== Qualification progress ==
Event	Quotas	Men	Women
Host nation	3/3	Canada; Canada; Canada	Canada; Canada; Canada
South American Games	2/2	Argentina; Argentina	Chile; Brazil
Pan American Sports Festival	1/2	~~Argentina~~; United States	Ecuador; Mexico
Central American and Caribbean Games	2/2	Mexico; Mexico	Mexico; Mexico
South American Championships	0/1	~~Argentina~~	Chile
Central American and Caribbean Championships	1/1	Brazil	Cuba
ITU Points list	22/17	United States; United States; Brazil; Mexico; Brazil; Chile; Barbados; Costa Rica; Puerto Rico; Chile; Ecuador; Ecuador; Chile; Cuba; Argentina; Ecuador; Colombia; Uruguay; Venezuela; Guatemala; Venezuela; Chile	United States; United States; United States; Bermuda; Argentina; Argentina; Brazil; Brazil; Puerto Rico; Chile; Guatemala; Guatemala; Puerto Rico; ~~Colombia~~; Costa Rica; Cuba; ~~Dominican Republic~~; Ecuador; ~~Colombia~~; ~~Colombia~~
Wildcards	5/7	Aruba; Belize; Bolivia; Nicaragua; Panama	Argentina; Cuba; Dominican Republic; Ecuador; Paraguay; Peru; Peru; Peru
Total	70	35	35

- Both declined Argentina quotas from the Pan American Sports Festival and South American Championships were won by the same athlete, who won a quota at the 2014 South American Games. These two slots were reallocated to the points list qualifiers.
- Only 22 and 17 female athletes were in the top 250 of the ITU Points List, and thus the last remaining spots for each event became a part of the wildcards.
