= Triathlon at the 2018 Central American and Caribbean Games =

- Venue: Playas de Puerto Velero
- Location: (Colombia) Barranquilla
- Dates: 1–2 August

The triathlon competition at the 2018 Central American and Caribbean Games was held in Barranquilla, Colombia from 1 to 2 August at the Playas de Puerto Velero.

== Medal summary ==
=== Men's events ===
Event	Gold	Silver	Bronze
Individual	Rodrigo González (MEX)	Crisanto Grajales (MEX)	Brian Moya (COL)
Team	Mexico (MEX); Rodrigo González; Crisanto Grajales; Eder Mejia	Colombia (COL); Brian Moya; Carlos Quinchara; Eduardo Londoño	Cuba (CUB); Michel González; Conrado Martínez; Victor Herrera

=== Women's events ===
Event	Gold	Silver	Bronze
Individual	Claudia Rivas (MEX)	Michelle Flipo (MEX)	Diana Castillo (COL)
Team	Mexico (MEX); Cecilia Pérez; Michelle Flipo; Claudia Rivas	Colombia (COL); Diana Castillo; Maira Vargas; Lina Raga	Cuba (CUB); Leslie Amat; Daniela Ciara; Tania Rizo

=== Mixed events ===
Event	Gold	Silver	Bronze
Team Relay	Mexico (MEX); Claudia Rivas; Rodrigo González; Michelle Flipo; Crisanto Grajales	Colombia (COL); Diana Castillo; Brian Moya; Lina Raga; Carlos Quinchara	Cuba (CUB); Leslie Amat; Michel González; Tania Rizo; Victor Herrera

== Medal table ==
* Host nation (Host)

Rank	Nation	Gold	Silver	Bronze	Total
1	Mexico (MEX)	5	2	0	7
2	Colombia (COL)*	0	3	2	5
3	Cuba (CUB)	0	0	3	3
Totals (3 entries)		5	5	5	15
