= Carlos Quinchara =

Colombian triathlete (born 1988)

Personal information
- Full name: Carlos Javier Quinchara Forero
- Born: 27 June 1988 (age 38) Bogotá, Colombia
- Height: 1.71 m (5 ft 7 in)
- Weight: 62 kg (137 lb)

Sport
- Sport: Triathlon
Medal record
Representing Colombia
Men's triathlon
Event	1st	2nd	3rd
CAC Games	0	3	3
South American Games	0	3	0
Bolivarian Games	5	1	1
Total	5	7	4
Central American and Caribbean Games
Silver medal – second place	2014 Veracruz	Team
Silver medal – second place	2018 Barranquilla	Team
Silver medal – second place	2018 Barranquilla	Mixed relay
Bronze medal – third place	2014 Veracruz	Individual
Bronze medal – third place	2014 Veracruz	Mixed relay
Bronze medal – third place	2026 Santo Domingo	Mixed relay
South American Games
Silver medal – second place	2018 Cochabamba	Individual
Silver medal – second place	2018 Asunción	Mixed relay
Silver medal – second place	2022 Asunción	Mixed relay
Bolivarian Games
Gold medal – first place	2013 Trujillo	Individual
Gold medal – first place	2017 Santa Marta	Individual
Gold medal – first place	2017 Santa Marta	Team
Gold medal – first place	2017 Santa Marta	Mixed relay
Gold medal – first place	2022 Valledupar	Mixed relay
Silver medal – second place	2013 Trujillo	Mixed relay
Bronze medal – third place	2025 Lima-Ayacucho	Individual

Carlos Javier Quinchara (born 27 June 1988) is a Colombian triathlete. He competed in the Men's event at the 2012 Summer Olympics.
