= Kevin McDowell =

American triathlete (born 1992)

Personal information
- Born: August 1, 1992 (age 33) Park Ridge, Illinois, United States
- Education: University of Colorado Colorado Springs
- Height: 6 ft 0 in (183 cm)
- Weight: 145 lb (66 kg)

Sport
- Country: United States
- Sport: Triathlon
Medal record
Men's triathlon
Representing the United States
Olympic Games
Silver medal – second place	2020 Tokyo	Mixed relay
Youth Olympic Games
Silver medal – second place	2010 Singapore	Individual
Pan American Games
Silver medal – second place	2015 Toronto	Individual

Kevin McDowell (born August 1, 1992) is an American professional triathlete. He currently resides and trains in Colorado Springs, Colorado.

McDowell was born in Park Ridge, Illinois in the northwest suburbs of Chicago, and was raised in nearby Mount Prospect until he was six years old, when his family moved to Geneva in the outer west suburbs.

McDowell was announced to be competing at the 2020 Summer Olympics in Tokyo. After the Games were postponed for a year, McDowell placed sixth in the men's triathlon on July 25, 2021. On July 29, McDowell won a silver medal in the first-ever mixed relay event alongside Morgan Pearson, Katie Zaferes and Taylor Knibb.
