= 2014 Bolivarian Beach Games =

II Bolivarian Beach Games
- Host city: Huanchaco, La Libertad
- Country: Peru
- Nations: 9
- Athletes: approx. 1000
- Opening: December 3, 2014
- Closing: December 12, 2014
- Opened by: Gloria Montenegro Figueroa; Mayor of Trujillo
- Torch lighter: Juninho Urcia
- Website: bolivarianosplaya2014.pe

The 2014 Bolivarian Beach Games, officially the II Bolivarian Beach Games, is an international multi-sport event held from December 3–12, 2014 in Huanchaco, Peru. Peru also hosted the inaugural edition in 2012, with Lima as the host city. Athletes from six Bolivarian countries and three invited countries (Dominican Republic, El Salvador, and Paraguay) participated in these Games.

== The Games ==
The Games took place in Huanchaco Sport Center, a sport complex already used for 2013 Bolivarian Games in Trujillo.

=== Participating nations ===
ODEBO Members

- Bolivia
- Chile
- Colombia
- Ecuador
- Panama
- Peru (Host)
- Venezuela

Invited nations

- Dominican Republic
- El Salvador
- Guatemala
- Paraguay

=== Mascot ===
Huanchaquin is the mascot for this edition of Bolivarian Beach Games. Created by designer José Raúl Quiroz Flores, the mascot is inspired from caballito de totora.

=== Sports ===
- Beach handball (2)
- Beach rugby (2)
- Beach soccer (1)
- Beach tennis (5)
- Beach volleyball (2)
- Open water swimming (5)
- Rowing (6)
- Sailing (8)
- Subaquatics (15)
  - Freediving (2)
  - Open water finswimming (12) (details)
  - Spearfishing (1)
- Surfing (12)
- Triathlon (3)
- Waterskiing (10)

== Medal table ==
Final medal tally

* Host nation (Peru)

Rank	Nation	Gold	Silver	Bronze	Total
1	Venezuela (VEN)	23	21	15	59
2	Peru (PER)*	21	17	16	54
3	Colombia (COL)	15	7	9	31
4	Chile (CHI)	6	8	10	24
5	Ecuador (ECU)	5	13	20	38
6	Paraguay (PAR)	1	2	0	3
7	El Salvador (ESA)	0	2	1	3
8	Dominican Republic (DOM)	0	1	0	1
9	Bolivia (BOL)	0	0	0	0
Totals (9 entries)		71	71	71	213

Host nation
