= Underwater sports at the 2013 Bolivarian Games =

Finswimming, free-diving and spearfishing events at San Lorenzo island

Underwater sports, for the 2013 Bolivarian Games, took place from 17 November to 29 November 2013. The three sports chosen for these Games were finswimming, free-diving and spearfishing. The two free-diving events was contested at the Sports complex Mansiche's pool. The long distance finswimming was held at Salaverry. Spearfishing events were held in waters north of the island of San Lorenzo located to the west of Callao.

== Medal table ==
Key:

* Host nation (Peru)

Rank	Nation	Gold	Silver	Bronze	Total
1	Peru (PER)*	4	2	4	10
2	Venezuela (VEN)	3	5	0	8
3	Colombia (COL)	3	4	4	11
4	Chile (CHI)	2	1	1	4
5	Ecuador (ECU)	0	0	2	2
Totals (5 entries)		12	12	11	35

== Medalists ==
Event	Gold		Silver		Bronze	
Men's individual dynamic apnea free-diving	Antonio del Duca (VEN)	208.34	Luis Arismendi (VEN)	183.53	Carlos Proaño (ECU)	127.20
Men's 50m surface bifin finswimming	Aziz Figarella (VEN)	19.42	Richard Farra (VEN)	20.79	Sebastian Madico (PER)	20.87
Men's 100m surface bifin finswimming	Aziz Figarella (VEN)	43.92	Sebastian Madico (PER)	46.06	Camilo Gamboa (COL)	46.67
Men's 200m surface bifin finswimming	Sebastian Madico (PER)	1:42.13	Camilo Gamboa (COL)	1:43.06	Juan Alonso (COL)	1:43.47
Men's 6 km long-distance finswimming	Alexander Jiménez (COL)	1:06:14	Gabriel Lomeña (VEN)	1:13:21	Erick Vásquez (PER)	1:14:37
Men's individual spearfishing	Miguel Soto (CHI)	100.00	Roger Carrillo (CHI)	78.60	Franco Bosquez (CHI)	67.40
Men's team spearfishing	Chile; Miguel Soto; Roger Carrillo; Franco Bosquez	n/a	Peru; Cesar Cuya; Eric Hanschke; Mario Espinoza	n/a	Not awarded	—
Women's individual dynamic apnea free-diving	Sofía Gómez (COL)	184.17	Karla Méndez (VEN)	167.53	Gilda Rivadeneira (ECU)	162.27
Women's 50m surface bifin finswimming	Andrea Cedrón (PER)	23.58	Yenny Téllez (COL)	24.16	Andrea Malarin (PER)	24.48
Women's 100m surface bifin finswimming	Andrea Cedrón (PER)	51.62	Cindy Mejía (COL)	51.94	Yenny Téllez (COL)	52.51
Women's 200m surface bifin finswimming	Andrea Cedrón (PER)	1:52.46	Cindy Mejía (COL)	1:53.13	Yenny Téllez (COL)	1:56.67
Women's 4 km long-distance finswimming	Johanna Alegria (COL)	46:01.12	Michelle Rangel (VEN)	53:15.88	Kaori Miyahara (PER)	53:36.99
