= Chess at the 2013 Bolivarian Games =

The chess competitions for the 2013 Bolivarian Games took place in Chiclayo from 19 November to 25 November 2013. Only a women's team event and a mixed team event were contested for medals at these Games.

== Medal table ==
Key:

* Host nation (Peru)

| Rank | Nation | Gold | Silver | Bronze | Total |
|---|---|---|---|---|---|
| 1 | Peru (PER)* | 1 | 0 | 1 | 2 |
| 2 | Ecuador (ECU) | 1 | 0 | 0 | 1 |
| 3 | Colombia (COL) | 0 | 1 | 0 | 1 |
| 3 | Venezuela (VEN) | 0 | 1 | 0 | 1 |
| 5 | Bolivia (BOL) | 0 | 0 | 1 | 1 |
| Totals (5 entries) | | 2 | 2 | 2 | 6 |

== Medalists ==
| Event | Gold | Silver | Bronze |
|---|---|---|---|
| Women's team | Ecuador; Martha Lorena Fierro Baquero; Carla Sofia Heredia Serrano; Abigail Eugenia Romero Echeverria; Rocio Nefertiti Vasquez Ramirez | Colombia; Melissa Castrillón Gómez; Beatriz Irene Franco Valencia; Milena Tatiana Herrera Rodriguez; Paula Andrea Rodriguez Rueda | Peru; Ingrid Yadira Aliaga Fernández; Ann Lindsay Chumpitaz Carbajal; Deysi Estela Cori Tello; Aurora Edith Felix Vega |
| Mixed team | Peru; Emilio Cordova Daza; Jorge Moises Cori Tello; Renato Terry; Deyvi Antonio Vera Sigueñas | Venezuela; Jose Luis Castro Torres; Rafael Felipe Prasca Sosa; Juan Armando Rohl Montes; Félix Ynojosa | Bolivia; Boris Ariel Ferrufino Hurtado; Mario Yber López Paniagua; Rodrigo Omar Mendoza Acuña; Jose Daniel Gemy Vargas |
