= Rodrigo González (triathlete) =

Mexican triathlete (born 1989)

Personal information
- Full name: Rodrigo González López
- Born: 14 December 1989 (age 36) Mexico City, Mexico
- Height: 180 cm (5 ft 11 in)

Sport
- Country: Mexico
- Sport: Triathlon

Rodrigo González López (Note: In this Spanish name, the first or paternal surname is González and the second or maternal family name is López.) (born 14 December 1989) is a Mexican triathlete. He competed in the men's event at the 2016 Summer Olympics.
