= Wushu at the 2013 Bolivarian Games =

Wushu, for the 2013 Bolivarian Games, took place from 17 November to 19 November 2013. The venue used for this sport was the Nuestra Señora del Rosario Colesium in Chiclayo.

== Medal table ==
Key:

* Host nation (Peru)

Rank	Nation	Gold	Silver	Bronze	Total
1	Venezuela (VEN)	8	6	1	15
2	Peru (PER)*	7	7	0	14
3	Ecuador (ECU)	0	1	2	3
4	Dominican Republic (DOM)	0	1	0	1
Totals (4 entries)		15	15	3	33

== Medal summary ==
=== Men ===
Event	Gold	Silver	Bronze
Taolu Changquan	Hernando Dudamel (VEN) (8.62)	Jorge Copara (PER) (8.27)	Julio Murillo (ECU) (7.42)
Taolu Nanquan	Luis Espinoza (VEN)	Leonardo Sánchez (PER)	Andrés Bermeo (ECU)
Sanda 48 kg	Yuri Flores (PER)	Rey Cisterna (VEN)	Not Awarded
Sanda 52 kg	Jhon Tinoco (PER)	Yovier Canelon (VEN)	Not Awarded
Sanda 56 kg	Brandon Herreras (PER)	Erick Encarnación (DOM)	Wladimir Carvajal (VEN)
Sanda 60 kg	Michael Herreras (PER)	Jean Carlos Rondón (VEN)	Not Awarded
Sanda 65 kg	Marco Antonio Cerrón (PER)	Alexis Álvarez (VEN)	Not Awarded
Sanda 70 kg	Diego Huerto (PER)	Hennys Ramírez (VEN)	Not Awarded
Sanda 75 kg	Jesús Licet (VEN)	Lenin Estrada (PER)	Not Awarded
Sanda 80 kg	Anthony Suárez (VEN)	Marlon Ramos (ECU)	Not Awarded

=== Women ===
Event	Gold	Silver	Bronze
Taolu Changquan	Joana Castellar (VEN) (8.62)	Cinthia Huaylla (PER) (7.5)	Not awarded
Taolu Nanquan	Ruth Landa (PER)	Johana Montaña (VEN)	Not awarded
Sanda 48 kg	Yasmeli Castellanos (VEN)	Dalia Zumaeta (PER)	Not Awarded
Sanda 52 kg	Jenny Parejo (VEN)	Vannia Ormeño (PER)	Not Awarded
Sanda 56 kg	Maderlyn Malave (VEN)	Gabriela Cerrón (PER)	Not Awarded
