= Equestrian at the 2013 Bolivarian Games =

Equestrianism (Spanish: Ecuestre), for the 2013 Bolivarian Games, took place from 21 November to 30 November 2013.

== Medal table ==
Key:

* Host nation (Peru)

Rank	Nation	Gold	Silver	Bronze	Total
1	Venezuela (VEN)	4	2	1	7
2	Colombia (COL)	2	3	2	7
3	Ecuador (ECU)	2	1	3	6
4	Peru (PER)*	0	2	1	3
5	Guatemala (GUA)	0	0	1	1
Totals (5 entries)		8	8	8	24

== Medalists ==
Event	Gold	Silver	Bronze
Individual dressage	Diana Elizabeth Rey Bermudez (COL) (68.542)	Radme Mahamud (COL) (66.396)	Loida Margarita Cebeira Trotzke (GUA) (66.067)
Team dressage	Colombia; Diana Elizabeth Rey Bermudez; Juan Mauricio Sanchez de Brigard	Peru; Margoth Batievsky Fleischman; Maria Gracia de la Piedra Graña; Monika Editha von Wedemeyer Geb Sc; Juan Carlos Hernaiz Caceres	Ecuador; Guido Jose Paez Puga; Martina Maria Falconi Barriga; Maria Jose Granja de Guzman; Carolina Espinosa Navarro
Individual eventing	William Narvaez Garzon (ECU)	Ronald Efrain Zabala Goetschel (ECU)	Juan Carlos Tafur Eisenmayer (COL)
Team eventing	Ecuador; William Narvaez Garzon; Gonzalo David Meza Paredes; Carlos Alfredo Narvaez Vasconez; Ronald Efrain Zabala Goetschel	Peru; Cesar Augusto Barzola Rodriguez; Cesar Jhosep Bobadilla la Torre; Jorge Ugarte Cordero; Diego Andres Farje Carpio	Colombia; Juan Pablo Garcia Salgado; Jhonathan Fabian Rodriguez Rodriguez; Juan Carlos Tafur Eisenmayer; Santiago Medina Negrete
Individual jumping (Round One; November 27)	Pablo Jose Barrios Lares (VEN)	Mark Bluman Donskoy (COL)	Andres Ignacio Rodriguez Gomez (VEN)
Individual jumping (Round Two; November 30)	Andres Ignacio Rodriguez Gomez (VEN)	Andres Ignacio Rodriguez Gomez (VEN)	Luis Ignacio Barreiro Muñoz (ECU)
Individual jumping (Round Three; November 30)	Pablo Jose Barrios Lares (VEN)	Luis Fernando Larrazabal Simon (VEN)	Luis Ignacio Barreiro Muñoz (ECU)
Team jumping	Venezuela; Luis Fernando Larrazabal Simon; Andres Ignacio Rodriguez Gomez; Pablo Jose Barrios Lares; Emanuel Alejandro Andrade Colmenares	Colombia; Mauricio Jose Guevara Cuervo; Juan Eliades Clavijo Gomez; Mark Bluman Donskoy; Hernando Carrasco Rodriguez	Peru; Michelle Maria Navarro Grau Dyer; Alonso Napoleon Valdez Prado; Maria Paz Gastañeta Mendiburu; Julian Duprat
