= Karate at the 2013 Bolivarian Games =

Karate competition

Karate for the 2013 Bolivarian Games, took place from 27 November to 29 November 2013.

== Medal table ==
Key:

* Host nation (Peru)

Rank	Nation	Gold	Silver	Bronze	Total
1	Venezuela (VEN)	5	5	5	15
2	Dominican Republic (DOM)	4	2	8	14
3	Ecuador (ECU)	3	2	4	9
4	Peru (PER)*	3	1	4	8
5	Chile (CHI)	2	0	6	8
6	Colombia (COL)	1	3	6	10
7	El Salvador (ESA)	0	3	0	3
8	Guatemala (GUA)	0	1	3	4
9	Panama (PAN)	0	1	0	1
Totals (9 entries)		18	18	36	72

== Medal summary ==
=== Men ===
Event	Gold	Silver	Bronze
Kata individual	Cleiver Casanova (VEN)	Nelson Cargua (ECU)	David Contreras (COL)
Kata individual	Cleiver Casanova (VEN)	Nelson Cargua (ECU)	Ariel Pérez (DOM)
Team kata	Peru; John Trebejo; Jimmy Moreno; Oliver del Castillo	Venezuela; Jean Vasquez; Luis dos Santos; Luis Contreras	Colombia; Santiago Vargas; Juan Puerta; Jonathan Bustamante
Team kata	Peru; John Trebejo; Jimmy Moreno; Oliver del Castillo	Venezuela; Jean Vasquez; Luis dos Santos; Luis Contreras	Ecuador; Andres Tejada; Fabian Jaramillo; Nelson Cargua
Kumite 60 kg	Jovanni Martínez (VEN)	Carlos Castaño (DOM)	Miguel Soffia (CHI)
Kumite 60 kg	Jovanni Martínez (VEN)	Carlos Castaño (DOM)	Dennis Lazo (PER)
Kumite 67 kg	José Ramírez (COL)	Carlos Galán (ESA)	Daniel Viveros (ECU)
Kumite 67 kg	José Ramírez (COL)	Carlos Galán (ESA)	Andrés Madera (VEN)
Kumite 75 kg	Dionicio Gustavo (DOM)	Aaron Pérez (ESA)	Leonardo Felizzola (COL)
Kumite 75 kg	Dionicio Gustavo (DOM)	Aaron Pérez (ESA)	Alexander Nicastro (VEN)
Kumite 84 kg	Jorge Pérez (DOM)	Jorge Merino (ESA)	Jorge Acevedo (CHI)
Kumite 84 kg	Jorge Pérez (DOM)	Jorge Merino (ESA)	Cesar Herrera (VEN)
Kumite +84 kg	Franklin Mina (ECU)	Alejandro Abdalla (GUA)	Anel Castillo (DOM)
Kumite +84 kg	Franklin Mina (ECU)	Alejandro Abdalla (GUA)	Ángel Aponte (VEN)
Kumite open	Ángel Aponte (VEN)	José Ramírez (COL)	Norberto Sosa (DOM)
Kumite open	Ángel Aponte (VEN)	José Ramírez (COL)	Daniel Viveros (ECU)
Team kumite	Venezuela; Ángel Aponte; Cleiver Casanova; Luis Contreras; Luis dos Santos; Cesar Herrera; Andrés Madera; Jovanni Martínez; Alexander Nicastro	Colombia; Jonathan Bustamante; David Contreras; Leonardo Felizzola; Diego Lenis; Juan Puerta; José Ramírez; Andrés Rendón; Santiago Vargas	Chile; Jorge Acevedo; Fernando Correa; David Dubo; Alejandro Mellado; Miguel Soffia
Team kumite	Venezuela; Ángel Aponte; Cleiver Casanova; Luis Contreras; Luis dos Santos; Cesar Herrera; Andrés Madera; Jovanni Martínez; Alexander Nicastro	Colombia; Jonathan Bustamante; David Contreras; Leonardo Felizzola; Diego Lenis; Juan Puerta; José Ramírez; Andrés Rendón; Santiago Vargas	Dominican Republic; Carlos Castaño; Anel Castillo; Miguel Dina; Dionicio Gustavo; Jorge Pérez; Ariel Pérez; Norberto Sosa

=== Women ===
Event	Gold	Silver	Bronze
Kata individual	María Dimitrova (DOM)	Elaine Martínez (VEN)	Nathalie Barrera (GUA)
Kata individual	María Dimitrova (DOM)	Elaine Martínez (VEN)	Sandra Salazar (PER)
Team kata	Peru; Saida Salcedo; Corina Rodríguez; Ingrid Aranda	Venezuela; Geris Vizcaya; Glorianny Rondón; Laura Jorgensen	Dominican Republic; María Dimitrova; Franchel Velázquez; Heydi Reynoso
Team kata	Peru; Saida Salcedo; Corina Rodríguez; Ingrid Aranda	Venezuela; Geris Vizcaya; Glorianny Rondón; Laura Jorgensen	Ecuador; Daniela Farfan; Yessenia Reyes; Suanny Guadalupe
Kumite 50 kg	Gabriela Bruna (CHI)	Aurimer Campos (VEN)	Ana Villanueva (DOM)
Kumite 50 kg	Gabriela Bruna (CHI)	Aurimer Campos (VEN)	Merly Huamaní (PER)
Kumite 55 kg	Genesis Navarrete (VEN)	Stella Urango (COL)	Yessy Reyes (CHI)
Kumite 55 kg	Genesis Navarrete (VEN)	Stella Urango (COL)	Ilce Díaz (GUA)
Kumite 61 kg	Jacqueline Factos (ECU)	Yaremi Borcelli (PAN)	Daniela Lepin (CHI)
Kumite 61 kg	Jacqueline Factos (ECU)	Yaremi Borcelli (PAN)	Lina Gómez (COL)
Kumite 68 kg	Lorena Salamanca (CHI)	Carmen Harrigan (DOM)	Ana Escandon (COL)
Kumite 68 kg	Lorena Salamanca (CHI)	Carmen Harrigan (DOM)	Milagros Alfaro (PER)
Kumite +68 kg	Isabel Aco (PER)	Valeria Echever (ECU)	Tamara Lucero (CHI)
Kumite +68 kg	Isabel Aco (PER)	Valeria Echever (ECU)	Johanni Sierra (DOM)
Kumite open	Jacqueline Factos (ECU)	Genesis Navarrete (VEN)	Johanni Sierra (DOM)
Kumite open	Jacqueline Factos (ECU)	Genesis Navarrete (VEN)	Maria Castellanos (GUA)
Team kumite	Dominican Republic; Ninoska Gil; Carmen Harrigan; Johanni Sierra; Ana Villanueva	Peru; Isabel Aco; Milagros Alfaro; Alexandra Grande; María Vindrola	Colombia; Ana Escandon; Lina Gómez; Sayaka Osorio; Stella Urango
Team kumite	Dominican Republic; Ninoska Gil; Carmen Harrigan; Johanni Sierra; Ana Villanueva	Peru; Isabel Aco; Milagros Alfaro; Alexandra Grande; María Vindrola	Venezuela; Franyerlin Brito; Aurimer Campos; Genesis Navarrete; Yeisy Piña
