= Water skiing at the 2013 Bolivarian Games =

Water skiing (Spanish:Esquí Acuático), for the 2013 Bolivarian Games, took place from 16 November to 19 November 2013.

== Medal table ==
Key:

* Host nation (Peru)

Rank	Nation	Gold	Silver	Bronze	Total
1	Peru (PER)*	4	3	5	12
2	Colombia (COL)	3	2	3	8
3	Chile (CHI)	1	4	1	6
4	Venezuela (VEN)	1	1	0	2
5	Ecuador (ECU)	1	0	0	1
6	Paraguay (PAR)	0	0	1	1
Totals (6 entries)		10	10	10	30

== Medal summary ==
=== Men ===
Event	Gold		Silver		Bronze	
Jump	Santiago Correa (COL)	57.8 m	Emile Ritter (CHI)	56.4 m	Mario Mustafá (PER)	41.7 m
Overall	Santiago Correa (COL)	2585.12 points	Emile Ritter (CHI)	2529.54 points	Rafael De Osma (PER)	2054.68 points
Slalom	Santiago Correa (COL)	3.50@12.00	Rafael De Osma (PER)	3.00@12.00	Emile Ritter (CHI)	3.00@12.00
Tricks	Emile Ritter (CHI)	4370 points	Rafael De Osma (PER)	4270 points	Santiago Correa (COL)	2800 points
Wakeboard	Juan Méndez (VEN)	87.10 points	Juan Martín Vélez (COL)	74.60 points	Kevin Bendlin (PAR)	66.70 points

=== Women ===
Event	Gold		Silver		Bronze	
Jump	Delfina Cuglievan (PER)	37.2 m	Pascale Ritter (CHI)	34.4 m	Paula Jaramillo (COL)	26.8 m
Overall	Delfina Cuglievan (PER)	2492.99 points	Pascale Ritter (CHI)	2281.69 points	María Alejandra De Osma (PER)	2151.13 points
Slalom	Delfina Cuglievan (PER)	2.50@11.25	María Alejandra De Osma (PER)	1.00@12.00	Paula Jaramillo (COL)	2.00@13.00
Tricks	Natalia Cuglievan (PER)	6790 points	Paula Jaramillo (COL)	4730 points	María Alejandra De Osma (PER)	3940 points
Wakeboard	Vanessa Kronfle (ECU)	73.00 points	Ana Chamorro (VEN)	53.70 points	Tamara Mustafá (PER)	47.40 points
