= Sailing at the 2013 Bolivarian Games =

Sailing (Spanish:Vela), for the 2013 Bolivarian Games, took place from 24 November to 29 November 2013.

== Medal table ==
Key:

* Host nation (Peru)

| Rank | Nation | Gold | Silver | Bronze | Total |
|---|---|---|---|---|---|
| 1 | Peru (PER)* | 3 | 3 | 3 | 9 |
| 2 | Colombia (COL) | 2 | 0 | 0 | 2 |
| 3 | Ecuador (ECU) | 1 | 0 | 0 | 1 |
| 3 | Guatemala (GUA) | 1 | 0 | 0 | 1 |
| 5 | Venezuela (VEN) | 0 | 3 | 3 | 6 |
| 6 | Chile (CHI) | 0 | 1 | 0 | 1 |
| Totals (6 entries) | | 7 | 7 | 6 | 20 |

== Medalists ==
| Event | Gold | Silver | Bronze |
|---|---|---|---|
| Men's laser standard class | Juan Ignacio Maegli (GUA) | Stefano Peschiera (PER) | Alexander Zimmermann Vega (PER) |
| Men's sunfish class | Alexander Zimmermann Vega (PER) | Jean Paul de Trazegnies Valdez (PER) | Julio David Silva Gutierrez (VEN) |
| Men's windsurfing RS:X class | Santiago Grillo (COL) | Daniel Flores (VEN) | Frank Eduardo Gutierrez Perez (VEN) |
| Women's Laser Radial class | Paloma Schmidt (PER) | Daniela del Valle Rivera Hernandez (VEN) | Caterina Isabel Romero Aguirre (PER) |
| Women's sunfish class | Stephanie Zimmermann Vega (PER) | Daniela del Valle Rivera Hernandez (VEN) | Kassya Marin Sanchez (VEN) |
| Optimist mixed class | Simón Gómez (COL) | Santiago Ugarte (CHI) | Francesca Foronda Benavente (PER) |
| Snipe mixed class | Ecuador; Édgar Andres Diminich Orellana; Juan Jose Ferretti Ramirez | Peru; Alonso Danilo Collantes de Riglos; Diego Figueroa Mantero | Not awarded |
