= Surfing at the 2013 Bolivarian Games =

Surfing (Spanish:Surf), for the 2013 Bolivarian Games, took place from 17 November to 22 November 2013.

== Medal table ==
Key:

* Host nation (Peru)

Rank	Nation	Gold	Silver	Bronze	Total
1	Peru (PER)*	8	7	1	16
2	Venezuela (VEN)	2	3	2	7
3	Ecuador (ECU)	1	1	2	4
4	Chile (CHI)	0	0	3	3
5	El Salvador (ESA)	0	0	2	2
6	Dominican Republic (DOM)	0	0	1	1
Totals (6 entries)		11	11	11	33

== Medalists ==
Event	Gold		Silver		Bronze	
Men's bodyboard	Jorge Hurtado (PER)	13.20	Sergio Alonso (VEN)	11.17	Pascual Silverio (DOM)	9.57
Men's bodyboard drop knee	Cesar Bauer Angues (PER)	16.17	Francisco Galdos (PER)	15.00	Renato Arellano (CHI)	11.43
Men's longboard	Benoit Clemente (PER)	18.46	Juan Jose Corzo (PER)	14.43	Isidro Villao (ECU)	12.74
Men's open	Miguel Tudela Chiozza (PER)	14.50	Joaquin Del Castillo Retamoz (PER)	13.96	Yoyssis Delgado (VEN)	12.66
Men's prone race	Javier Vargas (VEN)	38.57	Luis Eduardo Escudero De La Fuent (PER)	39.33	Amado De Jesus Alvarado Vasquez (ESA)	40.35
Men's SUP race	Tamil Martino (PER)	36,39	Francisco Hernández (VEN)	40,00	Alan Vogt (CHI)	41,33
Men's SUP surf	Tamil Martino (PER)	14.67	José Gómez (PER)	11.50	Francisco Hernández (VEN)	10.80
Women's open	Dominic Barona (ECU)	14.40	Miluska Tello (PER)	13.33	Anali Gómez (PER)	9.40
Women's SUP race	Edimar Luque (VEN)	37,12	Romina Álvarez (PER)	41,36	Margarita de la Adrovez (CHI)	45,36
Women's SUP surf	Brissa Málaga (PER)	13.00	Michelle Soriano (ECU)	9.20	Josselyn Alabi (ESA)	4.43
Aloha cup (Mixed)	Peru; Miluska Tello Perez; Sebastian Alarcon Zevallos; Juan Jose Corzo Caballero; Miguel Tudela Chiozza	40.43	Venezuela; Ronald Reyes; Rosanny Alvarez; Francisco Bellorin; Justin Mujica	35.56	Ecuador; Isidro Leonardo Villao Fernandez; Jonathan Alexander Zambrano Chila; Joshua Israel Barona Matute; Dominic Isabel Barona Matute	33.83
