= Inline speed skating at the 2013 Bolivarian Games =

Inline speed skating (Spanish: Patinaje), for the 2013 Bolivarian Games, took place from 24 November to 26 November 2013. The events, for this sport, were held in an indoor track venue.

== Medal table ==
- International Roller Sports Federation News About the 2013 Bolivarian Games

Rank	Nation	Gold	Silver	Bronze	Total
1	Colombia (COL)	6	3	3	12
2	Ecuador (ECU)	1	2	0	3
3	Chile (CHI)	1	1	3	5
4	Venezuela (VEN)	0	2	2	4
Totals (4 entries)		8	8	8	24

== Medalists ==
Event	Gold		Silver		Bronze	
Men's 200 metres C/R	Emanuelle Silva (CHI)	19.227	Felipe Castillo (VEN)	19.448	Andrés Muñoz (COL)	19.498
Men's 500 metres sprint	Andrés Muñoz (COL)	43.793	Sebastian Guzman (VEN)	44.052	Pedro Causil (COL)	44.353
Men's half marathon	Carlos Matute (ECU)	34:54.369	Jorge Bolaños (ECU)	35:51.494	Jorge Reyes (CHI)	35:51.600
Men's full marathon	Alex Cujavante (COL)	1:09:55.245	Jorge Bolaños (ECU)	1:11:21.209	Alexander Bastidas (VEN)	1:11:21.310
Women's 200 metres C/R	Yersy Puello (COL)	20.994	María José Moya (CHI)	21.208	Paola Segura (COL)	21.231
Women's 500 metres sprint	Paola Segura (COL)	47.644	Yersy Puello (COL)	48.414	María José Moya (CHI)	48.697
Women's half marathon	Johana Viveros (COL)	52:12.169	Yenny Serrano (COL)	52:12.173	Karla Parada (VEN)	52:12.283
Women's full marathon	Yenny Serrano (COL)	1:21:43.982	Johana Viveros (COL)	1:25:20.474	Valeria Riffo (CHI)	1:25:20.650
