= Water polo at the 2013 Bolivarian Games =

Water polo, for the 2013 Bolivarian Games, took place from 25 November to 30 November 2013. However, only the men's teams competed at these Games.

== Medalists ==
- Athletes' Names List that won Medals in Water Polo
- Summary Results for Water Polo at 2013 BG

Gold	Silver	Bronze
Colombia; Cristian Agudelo Bolivar; John Geiver Andrade Lozano; Juan Felipe Echeverry Zea; Andres Felipe Hernandez Diaz; Juan Pablo Hernandez Padilla; Jorge Andres Montoya Toro; Joaquin Marino Ortiz Avirama; Guillermo Perez Martinez; Jose Manuel Rengifo Giraldo; Enzo Salinas Hernandez; Jorge Enrique Soto Roldan; Carlos Eduardo Toro Guerrero; Juan Esteban Vasquez Hernandez	Venezuela; Jesus Alfonso Balza Chavez; Roberto Jose Balza Chavez; Douglas Ramon Espinoza Castro; Jimmy Alexis Ferraz de Sousa; Joaquin Armando Lopez; Oliver Alejandro Lopez Castillo; Pedro Jose Mujica Cardenas; Moises Enrique Perez Ribas; Antonio Jose Pirela Ortiz; Erick Igor Rodulfo Level; Angel Gabriel Rojas Borges; Adrian de Jesus Torres Granda; Hugo Enrique Velasquez Briceño	Peru; Alfredo Daniel Díaz Campos; Eduardo Grández Cardenás; Gerson Asbel Rolando Sinarahui; Diego Villar Osterling; Carlos Augusto Castro Callirgos; Amador del Solar Labarthe; Nestor Ricardo Guerra Torres; Diego Alonso Guevara Gonzalez; Javier Hinojosa Flores; Fernando Andres Noguera Novoa; Frederik Ernesto Paternoster Oporto; Aldo Enrique Schwarz Espinosa; Fernando Enrique Villar Osterling
