= Diving at the 2013 Bolivarian Games =

Diving (Spanish: Clavados), for the 2013 Bolivarian Games, took place from 21 November to 25 November 2013.

== Medal table ==
Rank	Nation	Gold	Silver	Bronze	Total
1	Colombia (COL)	7	6	2	15
2	Venezuela (VEN)	3	2	4	9
3	Ecuador (ECU)	0	1	1	2
4	Dominican Republic (DOM)	0	1	0	1
5	Chile (CHI)	0	0	2	2
6	Bolivia (BOL)	0	0	1	1
Totals (6 entries)		10	10	10	30

== Medalists ==
Event	Gold		Silver		Bronze	
Men's 1m springboard	Sebastián Villa (COL)	411.65	Sebastián Morales (COL)	391.85	Emilio Jose Contreras Cedeño (VEN)	369.85
Men's 3m springboard	Emilio Jose Contreras Cedeño (VEN)	414.10	Sebastián Morales (COL)	386.95	Edickson Contreras (VEN)	381.20
Men's 3m springboard synchronized	Colombia; Sebastián Villa; Sebastián Morales	n/a	Venezuela; Edickson Contreras; Robert Páez	n/a	Chile; Diego Alberto Carquin Saavedra; Donato Alejandro Neglia Escudero	n/a
Men's 10m platform	Víctor Ortega (COL)	449.40	Juan Guillermo Rios (COL)	443.75	Robert Páez (VEN)	384.45
Men's 10m platform synchronized	Colombia; Víctor Ortega; Juan Guillermo Rios	319.65	Dominican Republic; Argenis Alvarez; Frandiel Gómez	314.22	Ecuador; Jonathan Alejandro Posligua Velez; Walter Alfonso Vera Franco	295.95
Women's 1m springboard	Maria Florencia Betancourt Ortega (VEN)	257.45	Diana Pineda (COL)	256.65	Carolina Murillo (COL)	243.90
Women's 3m springboard	Diana Pineda (COL)	277.35	Carolina Murillo (COL)	266.55	Beannelys Sujeis Velasquez Salazar (VEN)	251.25
Women's 3m springboard synchronized	Venezuela; Maria Florencia Betancourt Ortega; Beannelys Sujeis Velasquez Salazar	255.69	Colombia; Sara Pérez; Diana Pineda	241.11	Chile; Wendy Denisse Espina Esquivel; Paula Javiera Sotomayor Godoy	222.33
Women's 10m platform	Carolina Murillo (COL)	347.20	Maria Florencia Betancourt Ortega (VEN)	274.90	Sara Pérez (COL)	261.25
Women's 10m platform synchronized	Colombia; Sara Pérez; Diana Pineda	238.65	Ecuador; Norka Gabriela Sabando Gutierrez; Rafaela Fernanda Suarez Ramos	199.95	Bolivia; Laura Alejandra Coronado Rivera; Natalia Claudia Coronado Rivera	157.38
