= Basque pelota at the 2013 Bolivarian Games =

Basque pelota (Spanish: Pelota vasca and Frontón, meaning pelota court), for the 2013 Bolivarian Games, took place from 18 November to 25 November 2013.

== Medal table ==
Key:

* Host nation (Peru)

Rank	Nation	Gold	Silver	Bronze	Total
1	Venezuela (VEN)	4	2	0	6
2	Peru (PER)*	2	0	2	4
3	Chile (CHI)	1	4	2	7
4	Bolivia (BOL)	0	1	1	2
5	Guatemala (GUA)	0	0	2	2
Totals (5 entries)		7	7	7	21

== Medalists ==
Event	Gold	Silver	Bronze
Men's frontenis 30 m	Chile; Julian Andres Gonzalez Salas; Ignacio Antonio Trucco Miranda	Venezuela; Jose Manuel Piña Piña; Jose Gregorio Zarraga Sanchez	Guatemala; Juan Diego Blas Fernandez; Jose Enrique Monzon Quesada
Men's pelota fronton	Peru; Mauricio Francisco Alvarez Infantas; Leonardo Lucas Benique Huamán	Bolivia; Horacio Subia Aguilar; Olsen Franz Cavero Garcia	Chile; Julian Andres Gonzalez Salas; Ignacio Antonio Trucco Miranda
Men's pelota de Goma (rubber ball) 30 m	Jaime Isaac Vera Hernandez (VEN)	Fernando Javier Celaya Gomez (CHI)	Juan Diego Blas Fernandez (GUA)
Women's frontenis 30 m	Venezuela; Maria Alejandra Borges Vega; Rosa Diaz	Chile; Natalia Andrea Bozzo Muñoz; Andrea Paz Salgado Poblete	Bolivia; Lucia Murillo Vilte; Norka Claros Revollo
Women's pelota fronton	Peru; Martha Gisella Monzón Rodríguez; Graciela Fernanda Valenzuela Carmona	Venezuela; Gazigy Naim Carrllo; Diana Carolina Rangel Mora	Chile; Natalia Andrea Bozzo Muñoz; Rosario Andrea Valderrama Labarca
Women's pelota de Goma (rubber ball) 30 m	Venezuela; Rosa Diaz; Gazigy Naim Carrllo	Chile; Rosario Andrea Valderrama Labarca; Zita Amaya Solas Aranzabal	Peru; Sandra Mariella Chávez D'onofrio; Karla Tatiana Rodriguez Romero
Mixed pelota fronton	Venezuela; Estibalitz Barreda Larrauri; Maria Alejandra Borges Vega; Rosa Diaz; Gazigy Naim Carrllo; Diana Carolina Rangel Mora; Carlos Moffa Davila; Jose Manuel Piña Piña; Jaime Isaac Vera Hernandez; Jesus Leonardo Zarraga Sanchez; Jose Gregorio Zarraga Sanchez	Chile; Natalia Andrea Bozzo Muñoz; Andrea Paz Salgado Poblete; Zita Amaya Solas Aranzabal; Rosario Andrea Valderrama Labarca; Fernando Javier Celaya Gomez; Julian Andres Gonzalez Salas; Ignacio Antonio Trucco Miranda	Peru; Sandra Mariella Chávez D'onofrio; Martha Gisella Monzón Rodríguez; Kattia Denisse Perez-Albela Bertolo; Karla Tatiana Rodriguez Romero; Claudia Marianne P. Suárez Paulet; Graciela Fernanda Valenzuela Carmona; Mauricio Francisco Alvarez Infantas; Marco Antonio Asmat Vera; Leonardo Lucas Benique Huamán; Cristopher Kevin Martínez Álvarez; Bruno Paolo Semino Voysest
