= Open water swimming at the 2013 Bolivarian Games =

Open water swimming, for the 2013 Bolivarian Games, took place on 21 November and 23 November 2013. This sport was contested at the port town of Salaverry.

During the 5 km race four swimmers and seven in the 10 km race, suffered hypothermia and could not finish the competition, being taken to the local hospital by the National Police of Peru.

== Medal table ==
Rank	Nation	Gold	Silver	Bronze	Total
1	Ecuador (ECU)	4	0	1	5
2	Venezuela (VEN)	0	4	3	7
Totals (2 entries)		4	4	4	12

== Medalists ==
Event	Gold		Silver		Bronze	
Men's 5 km individual	Iván Enderica (ECU)	55:45.99	Erwin Maldonado (VEN)	55:57.35	Luis Bolaños (VEN)	57:53.95
Men's 10 km individual	Iván Enderica (ECU)	1:57:51.00	Johndry Segovia (VEN)	1:58:31.00	Santiago Enderica (ECU)	1:58:47.00
Women's 5 km individual	Samantha Arévalo (ECU)	1:01:15.40	Paola Pérez (VEN)	1:02:17.40	Elzen Melo (VEN)	1:02:30.40
Women's 10 km individual	Samantha Arévalo (ECU)	2:08:33.00	Vicenia Navarro (VEN)	2:08:35.00	Paola Pérez (VEN)	2:09:10.00
