= Futsal at the 2022 Bolivarian Games =

Football competitions at the 2022 Bolivarian Games

- Football pictogram
- Venue: Coliseo de Ferias
- Location: Valledupar, Colombia
- Dates: 25–29 June 2022
- Competitors: 72 from 6 nations
- Teams: 6

Futsal competition at the 2022 Bolivarian Games in Valledupar, Colombia was held from 25 to 29 June 2022 at the Coliseo de Ferias.

The men's tournament was the only event scheduled to be contested. A total of 72 athletes (12 per team) competed in the event. The tournament was an open competition without age restrictions.

Hosts Colombia are the defending gold medallists.

== Participating nations ==
A total of 6 nations (3 ODEBO nations and 3 invited) registered teams for the futsal event. Each nation was able to enter a maximum of 12 athletes in their squad.

- Colombia (12 athletes)
- Dominican Republic (12)
- El Salvador (12)
- Panama (12)
- Paraguay (12)
- Venezuela (12)

== Medal summary ==
=== Medal table ===
* Host nation (Host nation)

Rank	Nation	Gold	Silver	Bronze	Total
1	Colombia (COL)*	1	0	0	1
2	Paraguay (PAR)	0	1	0	1
3	Panama (PAN)	0	0	1	1
Totals (3 entries)		1	1	1	3

=== Medalists ===
Event	Gold	Silver	Bronze
Men's tournament	Colombia; Jorge Abril; Angellott Caro; Yulian Díaz; Eduardo Garcia; Jhonatan Giraldo; Camilo Gomez; Richar Gutierrez; Dany Ortiz; Julian Pardo; Jose Esteban Sanchez; Sebastián Sánchez; Harrison Santos	Paraguay; Aldo Amarilla; Arnaldo Baez; Jonatan Franco; Alcides Gimenez; Giovanni Gonzalez; Ivan Gonzalez; Igor Insfran; Julio Damien Mareco; Hugo Martinez; Diego Poggi; Richard Rejala; Alan Rojas	Panama; Edwin Barahona; Aquiles Campos; Michael De León; Abdiel Escobar; Claudio Goodridge; Jorge Hernandez; Alfonso Maquensi; Ruman Milord; Jaime Peñaloza; Abdiel Ortiz; Édgar Rivas

== Venue ==
All matches were played at Coliseo de Ferias Luis Alberto Monsalvo Ramírez in Valledupar, which has a capacity for 3,000 spectators.

== Men's tournament ==
2022 Bolivarian Games Men's Futsal tournament
Tournament details
- Host country: Colombia
- City: Valledupar
- Dates: 25–29 June 2022
- Teams: 6 (from 2 confederations)
- Venue(s): 1 (in 1 host city)

Final positions
- Champions: Colombia
- Runners-up: Paraguay
- Third place: Panama
- Fourth place: Venezuela

The tournament consisted of a single group of 6 teams in which each team played once against the other 5 teams in the group on a single round-robin basis. The top three teams were awarded gold, silver and bronze medals respectively.

All match times are in COT (UTC−5).

=== Standings ===
Pos	Team	Pld	W	D	L	GF	GA	GD	Pts	Final result
1	Colombia (H)	5	3	2	0	23	11	+12	11	Gold medal
2	Paraguay	5	3	1	1	16	5	+11	10	Silver medal
3	Panama	5	3	1	1	21	12	+9	10	Bronze medal
4	Venezuela	5	3	0	2	23	17	+6	9	Fourth place
5	El Salvador	5	1	0	4	16	26	−10	3	Fifth place
6	Dominican Republic	5	0	0	5	7	35	−28	0	Sixth place

Updated to match(es) played on 27 June 2022. Source: Bolivarianos Valledupar 2022
Rules for classification: Tie-breakers
(H) Hosts

=== Matches ===
25 June 2022
17:00

Paraguay	8–0	Dominican Republic
Aldo Amarilla 2', 17'; Richard Rejala 7'; Diego Poggi 15'; Alcides Giménez 25', 38'; Alan Rojas 33', 39'	Report

Coliseo La Feria
Referee: Yuri García (Colombia)
25 June 2022
19:00

El Salvador	3–6	Venezuela
Marvin Díaz 11'; Carlos Sanz 25' (o.g.); Salvador Aguilar 40'	Report	Ronaldo Cabarcas 10', 13'; Carlos Sanz 14', 35'; Alfredo Vidal 17'; Enderson Suárez 22'

Coliseo La Feria
Referee: Oswaldo Gómez (Colombia)
25 June 2022
21:00

Colombia	4–4	Panama
Richar Gutiérrez 8'; Camilo Gómez 16'; Julian Pardo 19', 26'	Report	Alfonso Maquensi 20'; Edwin Barahona 25'; Aquiles Campos 33'; Abdiel Ortiz 34'

Coliseo La Feria
Referee: Daniel Manrique (Colombia)

26 June 2022
17:00

Paraguay	4–1	El Salvador
Richard Rejala 16'; Jonatan Franco 23'; Alan Rojas 23'; Alcides Giménez 26'	Report	Cristobal Osorio 5'

Coliseo La Feria
Referee: Héctor Cadena (Colombia)
26 June 2022
19:00

Panama	1–2	Venezuela
Alfonso Maquensi 36'	Report	Alfredo Vidal 39', 39'

Coliseo La Feria
Referee: Yuri García (Colombia)
26 June 2022 (Note: The Colombia v Dominican Republic match on 26 June 2022 was suspended at 5–0 due to heavy rain and was resumed the next day at 10:30 local time. The score did not change)
21:00

Colombia	5–0	Dominican Republic
Eduardo Riaño 5'; Harrison Santos 19'; Angellott Caro 19'; José Sánchez 22'; Julian Pardo 24'	Report

Coliseo La Feria
Referee: Oswaldo Gómez (Colombia)

27 June 2022
17:00

Dominican Republic	0–8	El Salvador
		Cristobal Osorio 20', 20', 21', 33'; Salvador Aguilar 21'; Rodrigo Contreras 24'; David Sandoval 34', 34'

Coliseo La Feria
Referee: Jhonatan Amaya (Colombia)
27 June 2022
19:00

Panama	3–2	Paraguay
Abdiel Escobar 36'; Alan Rojas 38'; Ruman Milord 39'; Abdiel Ortiz 34'	Report	Alcides Giménez 11'; Richard Rejala 22'

Coliseo La Feria
Referee: Nilson Noreña (Colombia)
27 June 2022
21:00

Colombia	7–4	Venezuela
Richard Gutiérrez 1'; Harrison Santos 6', 34'; Sebastián Sánchez 13'; Angellott Caro 36', 38'; Jhonatan Giraldo 39'	Report	Jesús Viamonte 2', 16'; Carlos Sanz 22'; Wilson Franccia 25'

Coliseo La Feria
Referee: Daniel Manrique (Colombia)

28 June 2022
17:00

Dominican Republic	2–3	Panama

Coliseo La Feria
28 June 2022
19:00

Venezuela	0–1	Paraguay

Coliseo La Feria
28 June 2022
21:00

Colombia	6–2	El Salvador

Coliseo La Feria

29 June 2022
17:00

El Salvador	2–10	Panama

Coliseo La Feria
29 June 2022
19:00

Venezuela	11–5	Dominican Republic

Coliseo La Feria
29 June 2022
21:00

Colombia	1–1	Paraguay

Coliseo La Feria
