= Climbing at the 2013 Bolivarian Games =

Sporting event

Climbing (Spanish: Escalada), for the 2013 Bolivarian Games, took place from 21 November to 25 November 2013.

== Medal table ==
Rank	Nation	Gold	Silver	Bronze	Total
1	Venezuela (VEN)	5	4	3	12
2	Ecuador (ECU)	3	4	5	12
Totals (2 entries)		8	8	8	24

== Medalists ==
Event	Gold		Silver		Bronze	
Men's block	Reynaldo Camacho (VEN)	n/a	Esteban Roberto Eguez Jara (ECU)	n/a	Manuel Escobar (VEN)	n/a
Men's difficult level	Reynaldo Camacho (VEN)	31.61	Esteban Roberto Eguez Jara (ECU)	44.70	Andres Marcelo Pazmiño Pastor (ECU)	54.74
Men's overall	Reynaldo Camacho (VEN)	n/a	Esteban Roberto Eguez Jara (ECU)	n/a	Josmar Nieves (VEN)	n/a
Men's speed	Erik Noya (VEN)	n/a	Josmar Nieves (VEN)	n/a	Leonel De Las Salas (VEN)	n/a
Women's block	Andrea Carolina Rosero Cascante (ECU)	n/a	Francis Guillen (VEN)	n/a	Sofia Correa Malherbe (ECU)	n/a
Women's difficult level	Sofia Correa Malherbe (ECU)	n/a	Francis Guillen (VEN)	n/a	Andrea Carolina Rosero Cascante (ECU)	n/a
Women's overall	Francis Guillen (VEN)	211	Sofia Correa Malherbe (ECU)	205	Andrea Carolina Rosero Cascante (ECU)	185
Women's speed	Nicole Agustina Mejia Jaramillo (ECU)	n/a	Lucelia Blanco (VEN)	n/a	Tania Valeria Rugel Quinto (ECU)	n/a
