= Judo at the 2013 Bolivarian Games =

Judo competition

Judo Judo at the 2013 Bolivarian Games
- Location: Trujillo, Peru
- Dates: 17–20 November

Competition at external databases
- Links: JudoInside

Judo, for the 2013 Bolivarian Games, took place from 17 November to 20 November 2013.

== Medal table ==
Key:

* Host nation (Peru)

Rank	Nation	Gold	Silver	Bronze	Total
1	Ecuador (ECU)	6	3	9	18
2	Colombia (COL)	6	3	6	15
3	Venezuela (VEN)	5	11	5	21
4	Dominican Republic (DOM)	2	4	7	13
5	Chile (CHI)	2	0	5	7
6	Peru (PER)*	1	0	7	8
7	El Salvador (ESA)	0	1	0	1
8	Panama (PAN)	0	0	1	1
Totals (8 entries)		22	22	40	84

== Medal summary ==
=== Men ===
Event	Gold	Silver	Bronze
55 kg	Jairo Viviescas (COL)	Armando Maita (VEN)	Kelvin Vásquez (DOM)
55 kg	Jairo Viviescas (COL)	Armando Maita (VEN)	Cristhian Toala (ECU)
Extra-lightweight (60 kg)	Juan Postigos (PER)	Javier Guédez (VEN)	John Futtinico (COL)
Extra-lightweight (60 kg)	Juan Postigos (PER)	Javier Guédez (VEN)	Lenin Preciado (ECU)
Half-lightweight (66 kg)	Wander Mateo (DOM)	Sergio Mattey (VEN)	Juan San Martin (CHI)
Half-lightweight (66 kg)	Wander Mateo (DOM)	Sergio Mattey (VEN)	Flavio Verdugo (ECU)
Lightweight (73 kg)	Fernando Ibañez (ECU)	Lwilli Santana (DOM)	Antonio Rivas (VEN)
Lightweight (73 kg)	Fernando Ibañez (ECU)	Lwilli Santana (DOM)	Daniel Vizcarra (PER)
Half-middleweight (81 kg)	Marcos Figuereo (DOM)	Juan Turcios (ESA)	Fernando Salazar (CHI)
Half-middleweight (81 kg)	Marcos Figuereo (DOM)	Juan Turcios (ESA)	Arturo Zapata (VEN)
Middleweight (90 kg)	Rafael Romo (CHI)	Mervin Rodríguez (VEN)	Pedro Castro (COL)
Middleweight (90 kg)	Rafael Romo (CHI)	Mervin Rodríguez (VEN)	Socrates Reyes (ECU)
Half-heavyweight (100 kg)	Italo Cordova (CHI)	Napoleon Martorelli (VEN)	Frank Alvarado (PER)
Half-heavyweight (100 kg)	Italo Cordova (CHI)	Napoleon Martorelli (VEN)	Jesse de León (DOM)
Heavyweight (+100 kg)	Pedro Pineda (VEN)	Freddy Figueroa (ECU)	Luis Salazar (COL)
Heavyweight (+100 kg)	Pedro Pineda (VEN)	Freddy Figueroa (ECU)	José Vásquez (DOM)
Nague no Kata	Colombia (Glatenferd Escobar, Luis Montes) (469.0)	Venezuela (Luis Jiménez, Javier Rivero) (442.0)	Peru (Jhonatan Gutierrez, José Torres) (378.0)
Open	Pedro Castro (COL)	Pedro Pineda (VEN)	Amado Santos (DOM)
Open	Pedro Castro (COL)	Pedro Pineda (VEN)	Freddy Figueroa (ECU)
Team	Venezuela (Javier Guédez, Armando Maita, Sergio Mattey, Antonio Rivas, Pedro Pineda, Mervin Rodriguez, Arturo Zapata)	Ecuador (Freddy Figueroa, Fernando Ibañez, Lenin Preciado, Exon Reyes, Sócrates Reyes, Cristhian Toala, Flavio Verdugo)	Colombia (Pedro Castro, John Futtinico, Luis Galindo, Marco Montoya, Luis Salazar, Juan Tello, Jairo Viviescas)
Team	Venezuela (Javier Guédez, Armando Maita, Sergio Mattey, Antonio Rivas, Pedro Pineda, Mervin Rodriguez, Arturo Zapata)	Ecuador (Freddy Figueroa, Fernando Ibañez, Lenin Preciado, Exon Reyes, Sócrates Reyes, Cristhian Toala, Flavio Verdugo)	Peru (Frank Alvarado, José Arroyo, Dilner Calle, Juan Postigos, Gian Vidaurrazaga, Daniel Vizcarra, Humberto Wong)

=== Women ===
Event	Gold	Silver	Bronze
44 kg	Milagros González (VEN)	Estefania Soriano (DOM)	Ibeth Heredia (ECU)
44 kg	Milagros González (VEN)	Estefania Soriano (DOM)	Thalia Gamarra (PER)
Extra-lightweight (48 kg)	Diana Cobos (ECU)	Diana de Jesús (DOM)	Karen Cortés (COL)
Extra-lightweight (48 kg)	Diana Cobos (ECU)	Diana de Jesús (DOM)	Andrea Gómez (VEN)
Half-lightweight (52 kg)	Hadhelhayd Quintero (VEN)	Tatiana Lucumi (COL)	Yolanda Arcos (ECU)
Half-lightweight (52 kg)	Hadhelhayd Quintero (VEN)	Tatiana Lucumi (COL)	Kristine Jiménez (PAN)
Lightweight (57 kg)	Diana Villavicencio (ECU)	Yadinys Amaris (COL)	Anriquelis Barrios (VEN)
Lightweight (57 kg)	Diana Villavicencio (ECU)	Yadinys Amaris (COL)	Karen Cornejo (PER)
Half-middleweight (63 kg)	Wisneybi Machado (VEN)	Diana Gómez (COL)	Estefania García (ECU)
Half-middleweight (63 kg)	Wisneybi Machado (VEN)	Diana Gómez (COL)	Karina Orellana (CHI)
Middleweight (70 kg)	Yuri Alvear (COL)	Vanessa Chalá (ECU)	Lissa Cabral (DOM)
Middleweight (70 kg)	Yuri Alvear (COL)	Vanessa Chalá (ECU)	Elvismar Rodriguez (VEN)
Half-heavyweight (78 kg)	Diana Chalá (ECU)	Keivi Pinto (VEN)	Not awarded
Heavyweight (+78 kg)	Anny Cortés (COL)	Leidi Germán (DOM)	Marlín Viveros (ECU)
Heavyweight (+78 kg)	Anny Cortés (COL)	Leidi Germán (DOM)	Giordana Gutiérrez (CHI)
Nague no Kata	Colombia (Nathalia Peña, Lina Rios) (475.0)	Venezuela (Niurka Flores, Karla Quiroz) (412.0)	Peru (María Borjas, Denisse Valenzuela) (355.0)
Open	Marlín Viveros (ECU)	Keivi Pinto (VEN)	Giordana Gutiérrez (CHI)
Open	Marlín Viveros (ECU)	Keivi Pinto (VEN)	Leidi Germán (DOM)
Team	Ecuador (Yolanda Arcos, Vanessa Chala, Diana Cobos, Estefania García, Ibeth Heredia, Diana Villavicencio, Marlín Viveros)	Venezuela (Anriquelis Barrios, Andrea Gómez, Milagros Gonzalez, Wisneybi Machado, Keivi Pinto, Hadhelhayd Quintero, Elvismar Rodríguez)	Colombia (Yuri Alvear, Yadinys Amaris, Karen Cortés, Anny Cortés, Tatiana Lucumi, Diana Gómez)
Team	Ecuador (Yolanda Arcos, Vanessa Chala, Diana Cobos, Estefania García, Ibeth Heredia, Diana Villavicencio, Marlín Viveros)	Venezuela (Anriquelis Barrios, Andrea Gómez, Milagros Gonzalez, Wisneybi Machado, Keivi Pinto, Hadhelhayd Quintero, Elvismar Rodríguez)	Dominican Republic (Lissa Cabral, Diana de Jesús, Leidi Germán, Luisa Jiménez, Angelica Peña, Estefania Soriano, Juana Villanueva)
