= Futsal at the 2013 Bolivarian Games =

Futsal (Spanish:Fútbol Sala), for the 2013 Bolivarian Games, took place from 21 November to 26 November 2013.

== Results ==
Event	Gold	Silver	Bronze
Men	Paraguay; Rodrigo Enmanuel Ayala Pereira; Rodrigo Gabriel Ayala Pereira; Carlos Alberto Espinola Cubas; Ivan Enmanuel Garcia Cañete; Juan Adrian Gomez Salas; Hugo Javier Martinez Villalba; Francisco Javier Martinez Villalba; Diego Ramon Melgarejo Pesoa; Magno Daniel Pereira Silva; Richard Manuel Rejala Mendoza; Edgar Manuel Santacruz Machain; Jose Luis Santander	Colombia; Hector Ovidio Acosta Muñoz; Luis Felipe Berreneche Piza; Angello Alexander Caro Garces; Steven Cetina Fula; Yefri Alexander Duque Tabarez; Yeisson Alexis Fonnegra Bolivar; Jhonatan Andres Giraldo Toro; Henry Albeiro Gomez Pineda; Richard Henderson Gutierrez Ojeda; Carlos Andres Ñañez Tovar; Christian Felipe Otero Gonzalez; Andres Camilo Reyes Julio	Peru; Jorge Illario Aguilar Copelo; Edson Leonardo Caceres Elias; Enrique Manuel Caldas Fernandez; Marcos David Canto Lavalle; Vladimir Hernan Falla Zelaya; Carlos Hernan Morey Gonzales; Renzo Jose Ramirez Sesquen; Cesar Jean Pierre Ruiz Frejeiro; Luis Abelardo Salerno Reyes; Jesus Alberto Suarez Caldas; Xavier Abram Tavera Guinet; Julio Cesar Alonso Tizon Silva
