= Triathlon at the 2013 Bolivarian Games =

Triathlon (Spanish:Triatlón), for the 2013 Bolivarian Games, took place on 25 November and 27 November 2013. The two individual races for these Games are officially the sprint distance ones.

== Medal table ==
| Rank | Nation | Gold | Silver | Bronze | Total |
|---|---|---|---|---|---|
| 1 | Ecuador (ECU) | 2 | 0 | 2 | 4 |
| 2 | Colombia (COL) | 1 | 2 | 0 | 3 |
| 3 | Chile (CHI) | 0 | 1 | 1 | 2 |
| Totals (3 entries) | | 3 | 3 | 3 | 9 |

== Medalists ==
| Event | Gold | | Silver | | Bronze | |
|---|---|---|---|---|---|---|
| Men's individual | Carlos Quinchara (COL) | 57:20 | Felipe Ignacio van de Wyngard Véli (CHI) | 57:57 | Juan Jose Andrade Figueroa (ECU) | 58:44 |
| Women's individual | Elizabeth Bravo (ECU) | 1:08:14 | Maira Vargas (COL) | 1:08:30 | Maria Cristina Farez Pucha (ECU) | 1:08:31 |
| Mixed relay team | Ecuador; Juan Jose Andrade Figueroa; Maria Cristina Farez Pucha; Andrés Miguel Cabascango Figueroa; Elizabeth Bravo | 1:13:48 | Colombia; Hernan Rubiano; Fiorella D'Croz; Carlos Quinchara; Maira Vargas | 1:14:55 | Chile; Tomas Olavarria; Favia Diaz; Felipe Ignacio van de Wyngard Véli; Andrea Longueira | 1:15:11 |
