= Badminton at the 2013 Bolivarian Games =

Badminton, for the 2013 Bolivarian Games, took place from 17 November to 21 November 2013.

== Medal table ==
Key:

* Host nation (Peru)

Rank	Nation	Gold	Silver	Bronze	Total
1	Peru (PER)*	4	2	4	10
2	Guatemala (GUA)	2	4	4	10
3	Dominican Republic (DOM)	0	0	3	3
Totals (3 entries)		6	6	11	23

== Medalists ==
Event	Gold	Silver	Bronze
Men's singles	Rodolfo Ramírez (GUA)	Heymard Humblers (GUA)	Mario Cuba (PER)
Men's singles	Rodolfo Ramírez (GUA)	Heymard Humblers (GUA)	Andrés Corpancho (PER)
Men's doubles	Heymard Humblers; Aníbal Marroquín (GUA)	Mario Cuba; Martín del Valle (PER)	Rodrigo Pacheco; Andrés Corpancho (PER)
Men's doubles	Heymard Humblers; Aníbal Marroquín (GUA)	Mario Cuba; Martín del Valle (PER)	Alberto Raposo; Nelson Javier (DOM)
Women's singles	Daniela Macías (PER)	Nikté Sotomayor (GUA)	Berónica Vibieca (DOM)
Women's singles	Daniela Macías (PER)	Nikté Sotomayor (GUA)	Ana Lucia de León (GUA)
Women's doubles	Luz María Zornoza; Katherine Winder (PER)	Krisley López; Nikté Sotomayor (GUA)	Daniela Macías; Camila García (PER)
Women's doubles	Luz María Zornoza; Katherine Winder (PER)	Krisley López; Nikté Sotomayor (GUA)	Beatriz Ramos; Ana Lucia de León (GUA)
Mixed doubles	Andrés Corpancho; Luz María Zornoza (PER)	Mario Cuba; Katherine Winder (PER)	Aníbal Marroquín; Krisley López (GUA)
Mixed doubles	Andrés Corpancho; Luz María Zornoza (PER)	Mario Cuba; Katherine Winder (PER)	Jonathan Solís; Nikté Sotomayor (GUA)
Mixed team	Peru Andrés Corpancho; Mario Cuba; Martín del Valle; Camilla García; Daniela Macías; Rodrigo Pacheco; Katherine Winder; Luz María Zornoza	Guatemala Ana Lucia de León; Heymard Humblers; Krisley López; Aníbal Marroquín; Rodolfo Ramírez; Beatriz Ramos; Jonathan Solís; Nikté Sotomayor	Dominican Republic Nelson Javier; Alberto Raposo; Daigenis Saturria; Berónica Vibieca
