= Basketball at the 2013 Bolivarian Games =

Basketball (Spanish:Baloncesto), for the 2013 Bolivarian Games, took place from 17 November to 29 November 2013.

== Participating teams ==
- Bolivia (men's and women's teams)
- Chile (women's team only)
- Ecuador (women's team only)
- El Salvador (women's team only)
- Peru (men's and women's teams)
- Venezuela (men's and women's teams)

== Medal table ==
Key:

* Host nation (Peru)

Rank	Nation	Gold	Silver	Bronze	Total
1	Venezuela (VEN)	1	1	0	2
2	Ecuador (ECU)	1	0	0	1
3	Peru (PER)*	0	1	0	1
4	Chile (CHI)	0	0	1	1
Totals (4 entries)		2	2	1	5

== Medal summary ==
Event	Gold	Silver	Bronze
Men	Venezuela; Jean Carlos Almeida Ruiz; Jhon Freddy Almeida Ruiz; Jesus Alejandro Izquierdo Mendoza; Luisbel David Madera Jaramillo; Luis Jose Madera Perez; Jesus Francisco Medina Lopez; Leinfer Acxiul Monte de Oca; Gustavo Adolfo Mora Concepcion; Danger Hobrayan Ortiz Jimenez; Jose Gregorio Rodriguez Fuentes; Luis Rosario; Lisandervi Jose Urbina Osorio	Peru; Patricio Bouroncle; Juan Carlos Calderón; Christopher Chang; Fernando Fung; Lucciano Giovannini Murillo; Hernán Andrés Goicochea Delgado; Luis Lazo; Christopher Nunura Dickudt; Piero Ramirez Magallanes; Cristian Jesus Ramirez Magallanes; Julio Regalado; Renzo Martín Yañez Fernandez	Not awarded
Women	Ecuador; Liliana Karina Angulo Tarira; Marjorie Amparo Caicedo Burbano; Elina Jacobe Figueroa Baquerizo; Doris Fernanda Lasso Perez; Leyda Susana Masias Burgos; Maria Daniela Mora Valdez; Rossana Mikaela Pasmiño Ludeña; Tatiana Leonor Patiño Torres; Dayanna Estefania Salcedo Salazar; Maria Jose Vinueza Franco	Venezuela; Yvaney Marquez; Cleyder Oderling Blanco Piñango; Natacha Bowpart; Yosimar Enriqueta Corrales Gomez; Zuly Jose Diaz Granados; Mayerling Landaeta; Luisana Carmen Ortega Ochoa; Waleska Alejandra Perez Abreu; Maria Requena; Roselis Carolina Silva Serrano; Amanda Torres; Daniela Andreina Waller Morillo	Chile; Catalina Alejandra Abuyeres Abarca; Sendy Genesis Basaez Narvaez; Ornella Casiccia Riquelme; Barbara Rocio Cousiño Contreras; Martinna Frings Uribarri; Jenifer Alejandra Fuentes Carrasco; Marisol Beatriz Gamboa Lastra; Claudia Angelica Inostroza Esparza; Milena Monserrat Koljanin Matta; Consuelo Peters Matamala; Fernanda Rivera Velasquez; Pia Analy Soto Mayerovich
