= Synchronized swimming at the 2013 Bolivarian Games =

Synchronized swimming (Spanish:Nado Sincronizado), for the 2013 Bolivarian Games, took place from 17 November to 20 November 2013.

== Medal table ==
Key:

* Host nation (Peru)

Rank	Nation	Gold	Silver	Bronze	Total
1	Colombia (COL)	3	0	0	3
2	Venezuela (VEN)	0	3	0	3
3	Chile (CHI)	0	0	2	2
4	Peru (PER)*	0	0	1	1
Totals (4 entries)		3	3	3	9

== Medalists ==
Event	Gold		Silver		Bronze	
Solo	Jennifer Cerquera (COL)	78.325	Greisy Teresa Gomez Fuenmayor (VEN)	75.625	Isidora Letelier Martínez (CHI)	69.450
Duet	Colombia; Estefanía Álvarez; Mónica Arango	77.837	Venezuela; Albany Avila; Karla Loaiza	74.887	Chile; Sol Josefina Lavaud Villalobos; Isidora Letelier Martínez	65.687
Team	Colombia; Jennifer Cerquera; Ingrid Cubillos; Alejandra Leyton; Zully Pérez; Sara Rodríguez; Jhoselyne Taborda; Viviana Valle; Jhossely Zafra	78.337	Venezuela; Laumeth Araque; Lenny Elizabeth Astete Valles; Albany Avila; Oriana Andrea Carrillo Rodriguez; Karla Loaiza; Stephany Murillo; Fredmary Solyana Zambrano Vielma; Wendy Marisol Hernandez Zambrano	74.687	Peru; Luciana Arcila Logreira; Karina Astrid Calizaya Torre; Cielomar Nicole Romero Garcia; Andrea Cristhine Diaz Murga; Diana Alexandra Martinez Rivera; Karen Janeth Rolando Walter	65.875
