= Rhythmic gymnastics at the 2013 Bolivarian Games =

Rhythmic gymnastics (Spanish: Gimnasia Rítmica), for the 2013 Bolivarian Games, took place from 27 November to 29 November 2013.

== Medal table ==
Rank	Nation	Gold	Silver	Bronze	Total
1	Venezuela (VEN)	5	2	2	9
2	Guatemala (GUA)	0	2	2	4
3	Ecuador (ECU)	0	1	1	2
Totals (3 entries)		5	5	5	15

== Medalists ==
Event	Gold		Silver		Bronze	
Individual all-around	Michelle Steffanie Sanchez Salazar (VEN)	53.400	Grisbel Andreina Lopez Ortega (VEN)	49.650	Linda Esperanza Sandoval Maldonado (GUA)	47.150
Hoop	Michelle Steffanie Sanchez Salazar (VEN)	13.800	Linda Esperanza Sandoval Maldonado (GUA)	12.350	Maria del Pilar Martinez Andrade (VEN)	11.900
Ball	Michelle Steffanie Sanchez Salazar (VEN)	13.150	Geraldine Melissa Perez Quito (ECU)	12.000	Damelis Melissa Valero Flores (VEN)	11.800
Clubs	Michelle Steffanie Sanchez Salazar (VEN)	13.650	Grisbel Andreina Lopez Ortega (VEN)	12.650	Linda Esperanza Sandoval Maldonado (GUA)	10.800
Ribbon	Michelle Steffanie Sanchez Salazar (VEN)	13.250	Linda Esperanza Sandoval Maldonado (GUA)	11.700	Geraldine Melissa Perez Quito (ECU)	11.250
