= Cue sports at the 2013 Bolivarian Games =

Cue sports (Spanish: Billar), for the 2013 Bolivarian Games, took place from 18 November to 22 November 2013.

== Medal table ==
Key:

* Host nation (Peru)

Rank	Nation	Gold	Silver	Bronze	Total
1	Venezuela (VEN)	7	4	3	14
2	Bolivia (BOL)	2	2	2	6
2	Chile (CHI)	2	2	2	6
4	Peru (PER)*	1	3	3	7
5	Ecuador (ECU)	1	1	1	3
6	Colombia (COL)	0	1	2	3
Totals (6 entries)		13	13	13	39

== Medal summary ==
=== Men ===
Event	Gold		Silver		Bronze	
Eight-ball singles	Jalal Yousef Sulaiman (VEN)	n/a	Christian Alberto Aguirre Cabrera (ECU)	n/a	Alejandro Heriberto Carvajal Ossandon (CHI)	n/a
Eight-ball team	Venezuela; Jalal Yousef Sulaiman; Frailin Dario Guanipa Perez	n/a	Chile; Enrique Leopoldo Rojas Contreras; Alejandro Heriberto Carvajal Ossandon	n/a	Peru; Cristopher Jaime Tévez Ocampo; Jhon López Román	n/a
Nine-ball singles	Jalal Yousef Sulaiman (VEN)	n/a	Cristopher Jaime Tévez Ocampo (PER)	n/a	Alejandro Heriberto Carvajal Ossandon (CHI)	n/a
Nine-ball team	Venezuela; Jalal Yousef Sulaiman; Frailin Dario Guanipa Perez	n/a	Chile; Enrique Leopoldo Rojas Contreras; Alejandro Heriberto Carvajal Ossandon	n/a	Ecuador; Daniel Jinsop Chavez Suqui; Christian Alberto Aguirre Cabrera	n/a
Ten-ball singles	Enrique Leopoldo Rojas Contreras (CHI)	643	Cristopher Jaime Tévez Ocampo (PER)	566	Jalal Yousef Sulaiman (VEN)	516
Ten-ball team	Chile; Alejandro Heriberto Carvajal Ossandon; Enrique Leopoldo Rojas Contreras	n/a	Peru; Cristopher Jaime Tévez Ocampo; Jhon López Román	n/a	Bolivia; Eder Fabián Vargas Villarroel; Leonardo Villarroel Argote	n/a
Three-cushion carambole team	Ecuador; Luis Eduardo Aveiga Ferrin; Patricio Javier Teran Noboa	n/a	Venezuela; Miguel Angel Canton Catari; Merlin Rolando Romero Canrro	n/a	Colombia; Henry Samuel Diaz Parada; Luis Angel Martinez Leal	n/a

=== Women ===
Event	Gold		Silver		Bronze	
Eight-ball singles	Nataly Viviana Camacho Villarroel (BOL)	n/a	Mirjana Carmen Grujicic Sarnelli (VEN)	n/a	Andrea Lissette Cardona Anacona (COL)	n/a
Eight-ball team	Peru; Jaqueline Elena Alvarez Francia; Jackeline Roxana Perez Bernal	n/a	Bolivia; Cinthia Monica Quiroga Rocabado; Nataly Viviana Camacho Villarroel	n/a	Venezuela; Carlynn Andrea Sanchez Torrealba; Mirjana Carmen Grujicic Sarnelli	n/a
Nine-ball singles	Carlynn Andrea Sanchez Torrealba (VEN)	n/a	Mirjana Carmen Grujicic Sarnelli (VEN)	n/a	Nataly Viviana Camacho Villarroel (BOL)	n/a
Nine-ball team	Venezuela; Mirjana Carmen Grujicic Sarnelli; Carlynn Andrea Sanchez Torrealba	n/a	Colombia; Andrea Lissette Cardona Anacona; Yenny Carolina Ruiz Vargas	n/a	Peru; Jaqueline Elena Alvarez Francia; Jackeline Roxana Perez Bernal	n/a
Ten-ball singles	Nataly Viviana Camacho Villarroel (BOL)	757	Carlynn Andrea Sanchez Torrealba (VEN)	639	Mirjana Carmen Grujicic Sarnelli (VEN)	579
Ten-ball team	Venezuela; Mirjana Carmen Grujicic Sarnelli; Carlynn Andrea Sanchez Torrealba	n/a	Bolivia; Nataly Viviana Camacho Villarroel; Cinthia Monica Quiroga Rocabado	n/a	Peru; Jaqueline Elena Alvarez Francia; Jackeline Roxana Perez Bernal	n/a
