= Canoeing at the 2013 Bolivarian Games =

Canoeing (Spanish: Canotaje), for the 2013 Bolivarian Games, took place from 17 November to 19 November 2013.

== Medal table ==
Key:

* Host nation (Peru)

Rank	Nation	Gold	Silver	Bronze	Total
1	Venezuela (VEN)	7	6	6	19
2	Ecuador (ECU)	7	5	4	16
3	Chile (CHI)	5	6	2	13
4	Colombia (COL)	1	3	4	8
5	Dominican Republic (DOM)	0	0	2	2
5	Peru (PER)*	0	0	2	2
Totals (6 entries)		20	20	20	60

== Medal summary ==
=== Men's events ===
Event	Gold		Silver		Bronze	
C-1 200 metres	Andrés Lazo (ECU)	41.69	Álvaro Torres (CHI)	42.43	José Ramos (VEN)	44.93
C-1 1000 metres	Johnnathan Tafra (CHI)	4:07.33	Eduard Paredes (VEN)	4:07.43	Vicente González (ECU)	4:26.71
C-2 200 metres	Venezuela; Eduard Paredes; José Ramos	38.45	Ecuador; Vicente González; Andrés Lazo	38.80	Chile; Johnnathan Tafra; Álvaro Torres	39.17
C-2 1000 metres	Chile; José Tafra; Johnnathan Tafra	3:44.55	Venezuela; Eduard Paredes; José Ramos	3:46.74	Ecuador; Vicente González; Andres Lazo	4:21.51
C-4 200 metres	Ecuador; Vicente González; Andrés Lazo; Gerson Leon; José Leon	36.90	Venezuela; Eduard Paredes; José Ramos; Heudin Guzmán; Eduyn Labarca	37.59	Peru; Jesús Gaona; Miguel Angel Gaona; Beldin Gaona; Antoni Noriega	43.57
C-4 1000 metres	Venezuela; Eduyn Labarca; Eduard Paredes; José Ramos; Heudin Guzmán	3:38.58	Ecuador; Vicente González; Andrés Lazo; Gerson Leon; José Leon	3:47.66	Peru; Beldin Gaona; Jesús Gaona; Miguel Angel Gaona; Antoni Noriega	3:57.69
K-1 200 metres	César de Cesare (ECU)	38.45	Antonio Oropeza (VEN)	39.79	Alexander Concepcion (DOM)	41.40
K-1 1000 metres	José Giovanni Ramos (VEN)	3:40.96	Yojan Cano (COL)	3:44.48	César de Cesare (ECU)	3:48.97
K-2 200 metres	Ecuador; Yautung Cueva; César de Cesare	33.25	Venezuela; José Giovanni Ramos; Antonio Oropeza	33.42	Dominican Republic; Alexander Concepcion; Cristian Guerrero	35.67
K-2 1000 metres	Venezuela; Antonio Oropeza; José Giovanni Ramos	3:26.94	Chile; Rene Susperreguy; Jean Valdebenito	3:28.10	Colombia; Leocadio Pinto; Edwin Amaya	3:33.36
K-4 200 metres	Venezuela; Ray Acuña; José Giovanni Ramos; Antonio Oropeza; Jesús Colmenares	3!1.93	Ecuador; Christian Altamirano; Washington Becerra; Yautung Cueva; Jorge Dicado	33.32	Colombia; Yojan Cano; Victor Baron; Leocadio Pinto; Edwin Amaya	33.36
K-4 1000 metres	Venezuela; Ray Acuña; José Giovanni Ramos; Jesús Colmenares; Juan Montoya	3:06.44	Chile; Rodrigo González; Rene Susperreguy; Jean Valdebenito; Miguel Valencia	3:12.51	Colombia; Yojan Cano; Victor Baron; Leocadio Pinto; Edwin Amaya	3:12.61

=== Women's events ===
Event	Gold		Silver		Bronze	
C-1 200 metres	Anggie Avegno (ECU)	43.45	Diana Paillalef (CHI)	51.98	Iris Rebolledo (VEN)	58.05
C-1 500 metres	Anggie Avegno (ECU)	2:18.99	Diana Paillalef (CHI)	2:29.44	Iris Rebolledo (VEN)	2:37.69
C-2 200 metres	Ecuador; Lissette Espinoza; Maria Belen Triviño	46.37	Chile; Nancy Millan; Diana Paillalef	48.92	Venezuela; Iris Rebolledo; Maira Yanez	56.04
C-2 500 metres	Chile; Nancy Millan; Diana Paillalef	2:06.88	Ecuador; Lissette Espinoza; Maria Belen Triviño	2:11.44	Venezuela; Iris Rebolledo; Maira Yanez	2:30.84
K-1 200 metres	Ysumy Orellana (CHI)	43.33	Tatiana Muñoz (COL)	43.84	Stefanie Perdomo (ECU)	43.88
K-1 500 metres	Tatiana Muñoz (COL)	1:58.40	Stefanie Perdomo (ECU)	1:58.97	Eliana Escalona (VEN)	2:00.38
K-2 200 metres	Chile; Ysumy Orellana; Fabiola Zamorano	41.68	Venezuela; Angélica Jiménez; Eliana Escalona	42.17	Colombia; Ruth Niño; Tatiana Muñoz	42.97
K-2 500 metres	Venezuela; Angélica Jiménez; Eliana Escalona	1:50.31	Colombia; Ruth Niño; Tatiana Muñoz	1:51.12	Chile; Ysumy Orellana; Fabiola Zamorano	1:53.51
