= Triathlon at the 2014 Central American and Caribbean Games =

- Venue: John Sparks Boulevard
- Location: Veracruz, Mexico
- Dates: 15-16 November

The triathlon competition at the 2014 Central American and Caribbean Games was held in Veracruz, Mexico.

The tournament was scheduled to be held from 15–16 November at John Sparks Boulevard.

== Medal summary ==
Event	Gold	Silver	Bronze
Men’s race	Crisanto Grajales (MEX)	Abraham Castellanos (MEX)	Carlos Quinchara (COL)
Men’s team	Mexico; Abraham Castellanos; Crisanto Grajales; Irving Perez	Colombia; Andres Diaz; Carlos Quinchara; Felipe Rodriguez	Puerto Rico; Edgardo Velez; Manuel Huerta
Women’s race	Claudia Rivas (MEX)	Anahi León (MEX)	Lizandra Hernandez (CUB)
Women’s team	Mexico; Adriana Barraza; Anahi León; Claudia Rivas	Guatemala; Barbara Schoenfeld; Daniela Schoenfeld	Colombia; Diana Castillo; Fiorella D'Croz; Lina Raga
Mixed team relay	Mexico (MEX); Claudia Rivas; Irving Perez; Anahi Leon; Crisanto Grajales	Puerto Rico (PUR); Melissa Rios; Manuel Huerta; Militza Rios; Edgardo Velez	Colombia (COL); Fiorella D'Croz; Carlos Quinchara; Lina Raga; Felipe Rodriguez

== Medal table ==
* Host nation (Mexico)

Rank	Nation	Gold	Silver	Bronze	Total
1	Mexico (MEX)*	5	2	0	7
2	Colombia (COL)	0	1	3	4
3	Puerto Rico (PUR)	0	1	1	2
4	Guatemala (GUA)	0	1	0	1
5	Cuba (CUB)	0	0	1	1
Totals (5 entries)		5	5	5	15
