= Table tennis at the 2013 Bolivarian Games =

Table tennis (Spanish:Tenis de Mesa), for the 2013 Bolivarian Games, took place from 25 November to 29 November 2013.

== Medal table ==
Key:

* Host nation (Peru)

Rank	Nation	Gold	Silver	Bronze	Total
1	Chile (CHI)	3	1	8	12
2	Colombia (COL)	2	2	0	4
3	Venezuela (VEN)	1	1	1	3
4	Paraguay (PAR)	1	0	0	1
5	Ecuador (ECU)	0	2	1	3
6	Guatemala (GUA)	0	1	1	2
7	Peru (PER)*	0	0	3	3
Totals (7 entries)		7	7	14	28

== Medalists ==
Event	Gold	Silver	Bronze
Men's singles	Victor Marcelo Aguirre Benitez (PAR)	Jorge Alberto Miño Puga (ECU)	Jaime Felipe Olivares Jara (CHI)
Men's singles	Victor Marcelo Aguirre Benitez (PAR)	Jorge Alberto Miño Puga (ECU)	Marco Antonio Navas Vizcarrondo (VEN)
Men's doubles	Chile; Jaime Felipe Olivares Jara; Alejandro Igor Rodrigueez Feres	Ecuador; Jorge Alberto Miño Puga; Dino Armando Suarez Aviles Woelke	Chile; Gustavo Alejadro Gomez Hernandez; Manuel Alfonso Moya Maureira
Men's doubles	Chile; Jaime Felipe Olivares Jara; Alejandro Igor Rodrigueez Feres	Ecuador; Jorge Alberto Miño Puga; Dino Armando Suarez Aviles Woelke	Peru; Julio Li Davelouis; Bryan Blas Arevalo
Men's team	Chile; Gustavo Alejadro Gomez Hernandez; Manuel Alfonso Moya Maureira; Jaime Felipe Olivares Jara; Alejandro Igor Rodrigueez Feres	Guatemala; Hector Rene Gatica; Heber Moises Moscoso Cruz; Jose Miguel Ramirez Marin; Kevin Josue Soto	Ecuador; Jorge Alberto Miño Puga; Ivan Andres Proaño Quimis; Dino Armando Suarez Aviles Woelke; Rodrigo Eduardo Tapia Fiallo
Men's team	Chile; Gustavo Alejadro Gomez Hernandez; Manuel Alfonso Moya Maureira; Jaime Felipe Olivares Jara; Alejandro Igor Rodrigueez Feres	Guatemala; Hector Rene Gatica; Heber Moises Moscoso Cruz; Jose Miguel Ramirez Marin; Kevin Josue Soto	Peru; Bryan Blas Arevalo; Johan Chavez Bravo; Julio Li Davelouis; Diego Rodriguez Egocheaga
Women's singles	Paula Medina (COL)	Katherine Alejandra Low Beattie (CHI)	Maria Paulina Vega Magaña (CHI)
Women's singles	Paula Medina (COL)	Katherine Alejandra Low Beattie (CHI)	Berta Antonia Rodriguez (CHI)
Women's doubles	Colombia; Paula Medina; Lady Ruano	Venezuela; Gremlis Andreina Arvelo Garcia; Roxy Evelin Gonzalez Benitez	Chile; Berta Antonia Rodriguez; Katherine Alejandra Low Beattie
Women's doubles	Colombia; Paula Medina; Lady Ruano	Venezuela; Gremlis Andreina Arvelo Garcia; Roxy Evelin Gonzalez Benitez	Chile; Natalia Andrea Castellano Vera; Maria Paulina Vega Magaña
Women's team	Chile; Natalia Andrea Castellano Vera; Katherine Alejandra Low Beattie; Berta Antonia Rodriguez; Maria Paulina Vega Magaña	Colombia; Paula Medina; María Perdomo; Lady Ruano	Guatemala; Mabelyn Adriana Enriquez Carias; Andrea Estrada Muralles; Analdy Celeste Lopez Gomez; Lilia Maria Montufar Elel
Women's team	Chile; Natalia Andrea Castellano Vera; Katherine Alejandra Low Beattie; Berta Antonia Rodriguez; Maria Paulina Vega Magaña	Colombia; Paula Medina; María Perdomo; Lady Ruano	Peru; Marisol Espineira Jimenez; Angela Maria Mori Rios; Maria Fernanda Ortiz; Gabriela Rosaura Soto Soler
Mixed doubles	Venezuela; Gremlis Andreina Arvelo Garcia; Marco Antonio Navas Vizcarrondo	Colombia; Paula Medina; Alexander Echavarria	Chile; Berta Antonia Rodriguez; Manuel Alfonso Moya Maureira
Mixed doubles	Venezuela; Gremlis Andreina Arvelo Garcia; Marco Antonio Navas Vizcarrondo	Colombia; Paula Medina; Alexander Echavarria	Chile; Maria Paulina Vega Magaña; Jaime Felipe Olivares Jara
