= Golf at the 2013 Bolivarian Games =

Golf, for the 2013 Bolivarian Games, took place from 16 November to 19 November 2013.

== Results ==
=== Men ===
==== First round ====
Saturday November 16, 2013

Place	Player	Country	Score	To par
1	Patricio Salem Sambuceti	Peru	71	−1
T2	Denis Meneghini	Venezuela	71	−1
T2	Alvaro Pinedo Suarez	Colombia	71	−1
4	Ernesto Vitienes	Dominican Republic	72	E
5	Sabastian Salem Sambuceti	Peru	73	+1
T6	Rafael Guerrero Aluria	Venezuela	74	+2
T6	Matias Velazquez	Paraguay	74	+2
T6	Herbert Day Pan	El Salvador	74	+2
T6	Daniel Gurtner Morales	Guatemala	74	+2
T10	Julio Santos Polanco	Dominican Republic	76	+4
T10	Omar Tejeira	Panama	76	+4
T12	Jose Rolz Hernandez	Guatemala	77	+5
T12	Marcos Cabarcos	Panama	77	+5
T12	Jesus Osmar Gutierrez	Colombia	77	+5
15	Vittorio Eduardo	Bolivia	83	+11
16	Alejandro Meriles	Bolivia	86	+14

==== Second round ====
Sunday November 17, 2013

Place	Player	Country	Score	To par
1	Alvaro Pinedo Suarez	Colombia	71-64=135	−9
2	Patricio Salem Sambuceti	Peru	69-68=137	−7
T3	Sebastian Salem Sambuceti	Peru	73-69=142	−2
T3	Denis Meneghini	Venezuela	71-71=142	−2
5	Ernesto Vitienes	Dominican Republic	72-71=143	−1
6	Herbert Day Pan	El Salvador	74-71=145	+1
7	Rafael Guerrero Aluria	Venezuela	74-72=146	+2
8	Marcos Cabarcos	Panama	77-70=147	+3
9	Daniel Gurtner Morales	Guatemala	74-74=148	+4
T10	Omar Tejeira	Panama	76-74=150	+6
T10	Matias Velazquez	Paraguay	74-76=150	+6
T12	Julio Santos Polanco	Dominican Republic	76-75=151	+7
T12	Jose Rolz Hernandez	Guatemala	77-74=151	+7
T12	Jesus Osmar Gutierrez	Colombia	77-74=151	+7
15	Vittorio Eduardo	Bolivia	83-83=166	+22
16	Alejandro Meriles	Bolivia	86-81=167	+23

==== Third round ====
Monday November 18, 2013

Place	Player	Country	Score	To par
1	Patricio Salem Sambuceti	Peru	69-68-70=207	−9
2	Alvaro Pinedo Suarez	Colombia	71-64-74=209	−7
3	Denis Meneghini	Venezuela	71-71-71=213	−3
4	Sebastian Salem Sambuceti	Peru	73-69-72=214	−2
5	Ernesto Vitienes	Dominican Republic	72-71-72=215	−1
6	Rafael Guerrero Aluria	Venezuela	74-72-71=217	+1
T7	Marcos Cabarcos	Panama	77-70-74=221	+5
T7	Jesus Osmar Gutierrez	Colombia	77-74-70=221	+5
9	Herbert Day Pan	El Salvador	74-71-77=222	+6
10	Daniel Gurtner Morales	Guatemala	74-74-75=223	+7
11	Julio Santos Polanco	Dominican Republic	76-75-74=225	+9
12	Jose Rolz Hernandez	Guatemala	77-74-76=227	+11
13	Omar Tejeira	Panama	76-74-78=228	+12
14	Matias Velazquez	Paraguay	74-76-83=233	+17
15	Alejandro Meriles	Bolivia	86-81-78=245	+29
16	Vittorio Eduardo	Bolivia	83-83-83=249	+33

==== Final round ====
Tuesday November 19, 2013

Place	Player	Country	Score	To par
T1	Alvaro Pinedo Suarez	Colombia	71-64-74-73=282	−6
T1	Patricio Salem Sambuceti	Peru	69-68-70-75=282	−6
3	Sebastian Salem Sambuceti	Peru	73-69-72-70=284	−4
4	Denis Meneghini	Venezuela	71-71-71-73=286	−2
5	Rafael Guerrero Aluria	Venezuela	74-72-71-71=288	E
6	Ernesto Vitienes	Dominican Republic	72-71-72-74=289	+1
7	Marcos Cabarcos	Panama	77-70-74-69=290	+2
T8	Herbert Day Pan	El Salvador	74-71-77-74=296	+8
T8	Julio Santos Polanco	Dominican Republic	76-75-74-71=296	+8
T8	Jose Rolz Hernandez	Guatemala	77-74-76-69=296	+8
11	Daniel Gurtner Morales	Guatemala	74-74-75-74=297	+9
12	Omar Tejeira	Panama	76-74-78-70=298	+10
13	Jesus Osmar Gutierrez	Colombia	77-74-70-80=301	+13
14	Matias Velazquez	Paraguay	74-76-83-75=308	+20
15	Vittorio Eduardo	Bolivia	83-83-83-81=330	+42
16	Alejandro Meriles	Bolivia	86-81-78-95=340	+52

=== Men's Final Results ===
(gold) (Colombia) Alvaro Pinedo Suarez (silver) (Peru) Patricio Salem Sambuceti (bronze) (Peru) Sebastian Salem Sambuceti

=== Women ===
==== First round ====
Saturday November 16, 2013

Place	Player	Country	Score	To par
T1	Lucia Polo Galvez	Guatemala	75	+3
T1	Vilma Vaccaro Ferreira	Paraguay	75	+3
3	Maria Salinas Valle	Peru	77	+5
T4	Ariadna Fonseca Diaz	Venezuela	78	+6
T4	Daniela Vargas Alvarez	Colombia	78	+6
T6	Eileenn Vargas Alvarez	Colombia	79	+7
T6	Valentina Gilly Lora	Venezuela	79	+7
8	Maria de Souza Aranda	Peru	80	+8
9	Stefania Guachalla	Bolivia	92	+20
10	Pilar Echeverria	Guatemala	99	+27

==== Second round ====
Sunday November 17, 2013

Place	Player	Country	Score	To par
1	Maria Salinas Valle	Peru	77-68=145	+1
2	Lucia Polo Galvez	Guatemala	75-73=148	+4
T3	Daniela Vargas Alvarez	Colombia	78-73=151	+7
T3	Vilma Vaccaro Ferreira	Paraguay	75-76=151	+7
5	Valentina Gilly Lora	Venezuela	79-74=153	+9
6	Ariadna Fonseca Diaz	Venezuela	78-78=156	+12
7	Eileenn Vargas Alvarez	Colombia	79-78=157	+13
8	Maria de Souza Aranda	Peru	80-78=158	+14
9	Pilar Echeverria	Guatemala	99-75=174	+30
10	Stefania Guachalla	Bolivia	92-84=176	+32
