= 2013 Bolivarian Games =

Multi-sport event in 2013 in Trujillo, Peru

XVII Bolivarian Games
- Logo for the 2013 Bolivarian Games
- Host city: Trujillo, La Libertad
- Country: Peru
- Nations: 11
- Athletes: 4,380
- Events: 561 in 44 sports
- Opening: November 16, 2013
- Closing: November 30, 2013
- Opened by: Ollanta Humala Tasso
- Torch lighter: Natalia Málaga
- Website: www.bolivarianos2013.pe

The 2013 Bolivarian Games (Spanish: Juegos Bolivarianos), officially the XVII Bolivarian Games, was a major international multi-sport event that was held from November 16–30, 2013, in Trujillo, Peru, with some events held in Lima and Chiclayo. Approximately 4,500 athletes from 11 nations participated in 44 sports. These Games was the third Bolivarian Games that was hosted by Peru. Previously, Peru hosted the 1947–48 Bolivarian Games and the 1997 Bolivarian Games. Since 2011, Trujillo was preparing the sport buildings for the Bolivarian Games.

The 2013 Bolivarian Games was the first one to have athletes from 11 countries, instead of the usual 6 members of the Bolivarian Sports Organization (ODEBO).

== Host city election ==
Location of Trujillo in Peru.

The Bolivarian Sports Organization (ODEBO) selected initially Panama City as the host for the 17th Bolivarian Games on May 5, 2010. ODEBO selected the city, after both opposing bids from Venezuela and Ecuador were dismissed. Venezuela's bid fell through, due to not getting general support from then Venezuelan President Hugo Chávez. Ecuador's bid was just not handed in on time, in order to be an official one.

On October 20, 2010, ODEBO decided to withdraw Panama City as host, .ODEBO explained that Panama's Olympic Committee has actually two committees with two co-presidents in conflict, Miguel Vanegas and Miguel Sánchiz, one recognized by Panama's Supreme Court of Justice and the other one recognized by IOC. Ricardo Martinelli, Panama's president, commented: "I'm going to kill both of them... I will publicly ask both of them to hand over their resignations for the good of this country and stop with their petty personal interests.

Early 2011, Trujillo began to bid, to replace Panama City, as host of the 2013 Bolivarian Games. ODEBO's Games commission traveled to the Peruvian city to make a visual inspection of its facilities. The review found that Trujillo is capable of hosting the Games and unofficially stated that the city will host the 2013 Bolivarian Games. The official announcement was given on February 7, 2012, in Rio de Janeiro. Trujillo city will house about 4000 athletes from 11 countries in a modern sports complex.

== Sport venues ==
- Mansiche Sports Complex
  - Estadio Mansiche (Ceremonies venue, located in the Historic Centre of Trujillo city.)
  - Coliseo Gran Chimu
- Sports Complex Chicago
- Gildemeister Swimming Pool
- Huanchaco Sports Center
- La Esperanza Sports Center
Sport venues
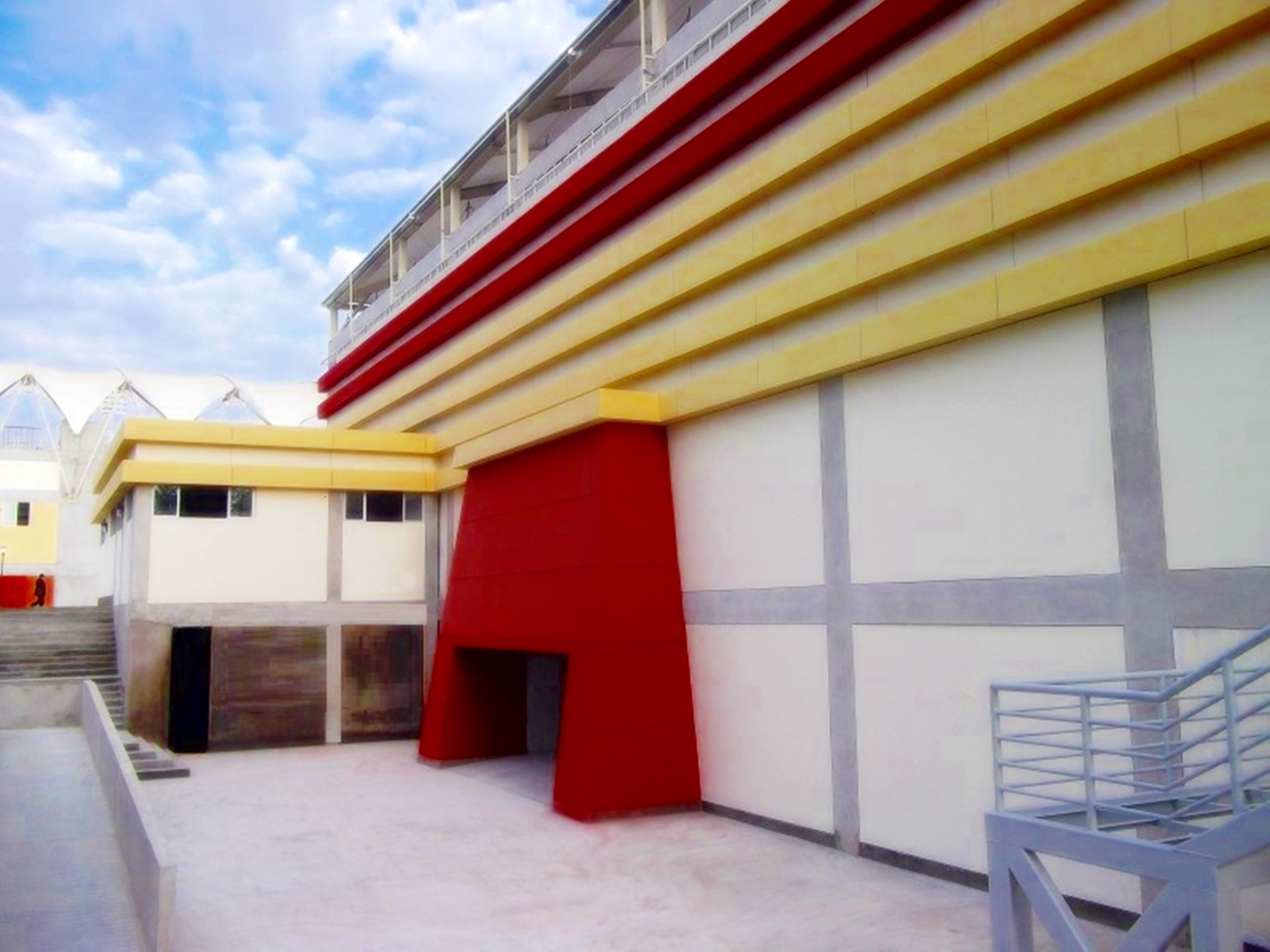
Polideportivo Huaca del Sol

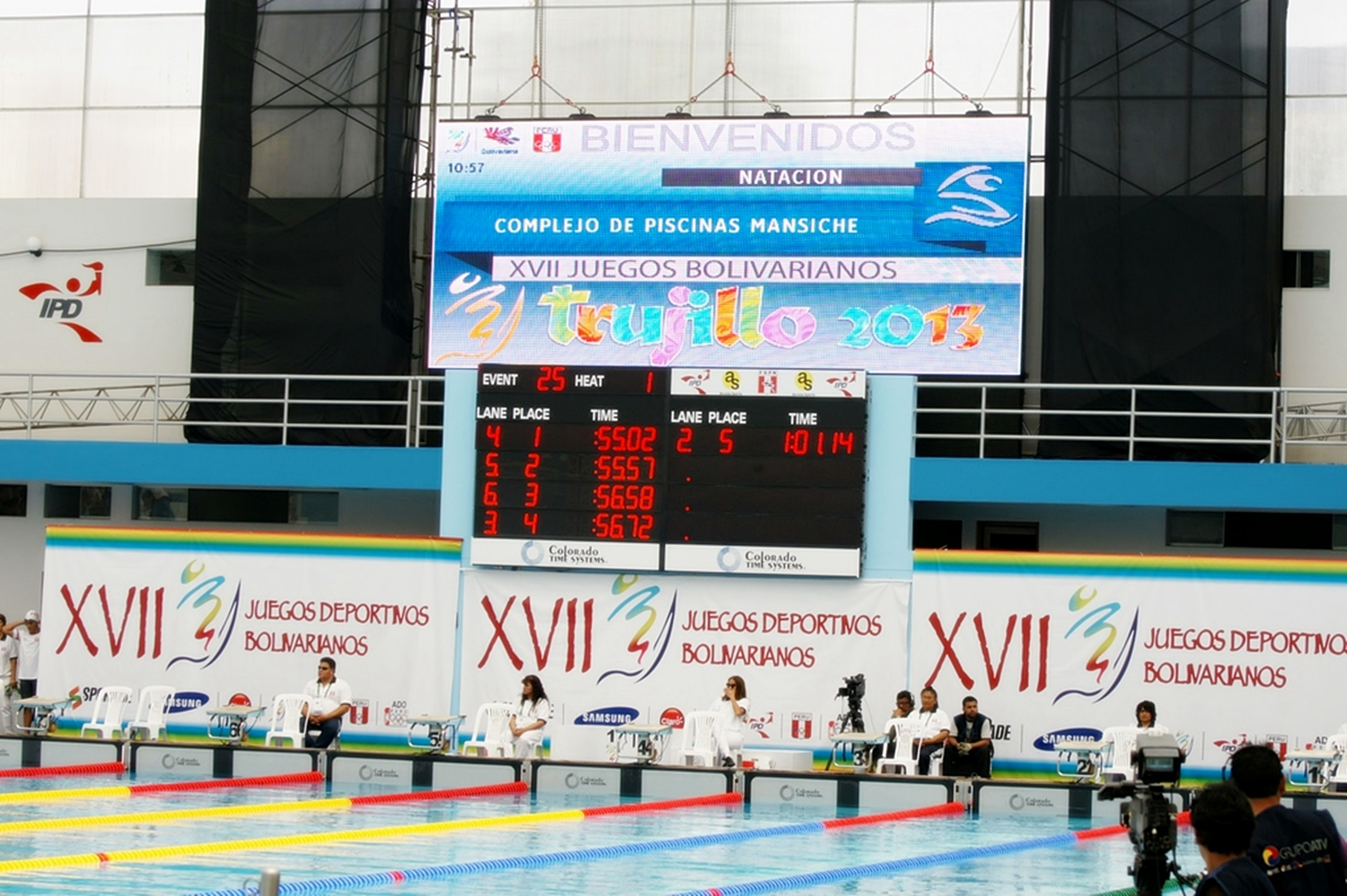
Pool Mansiche

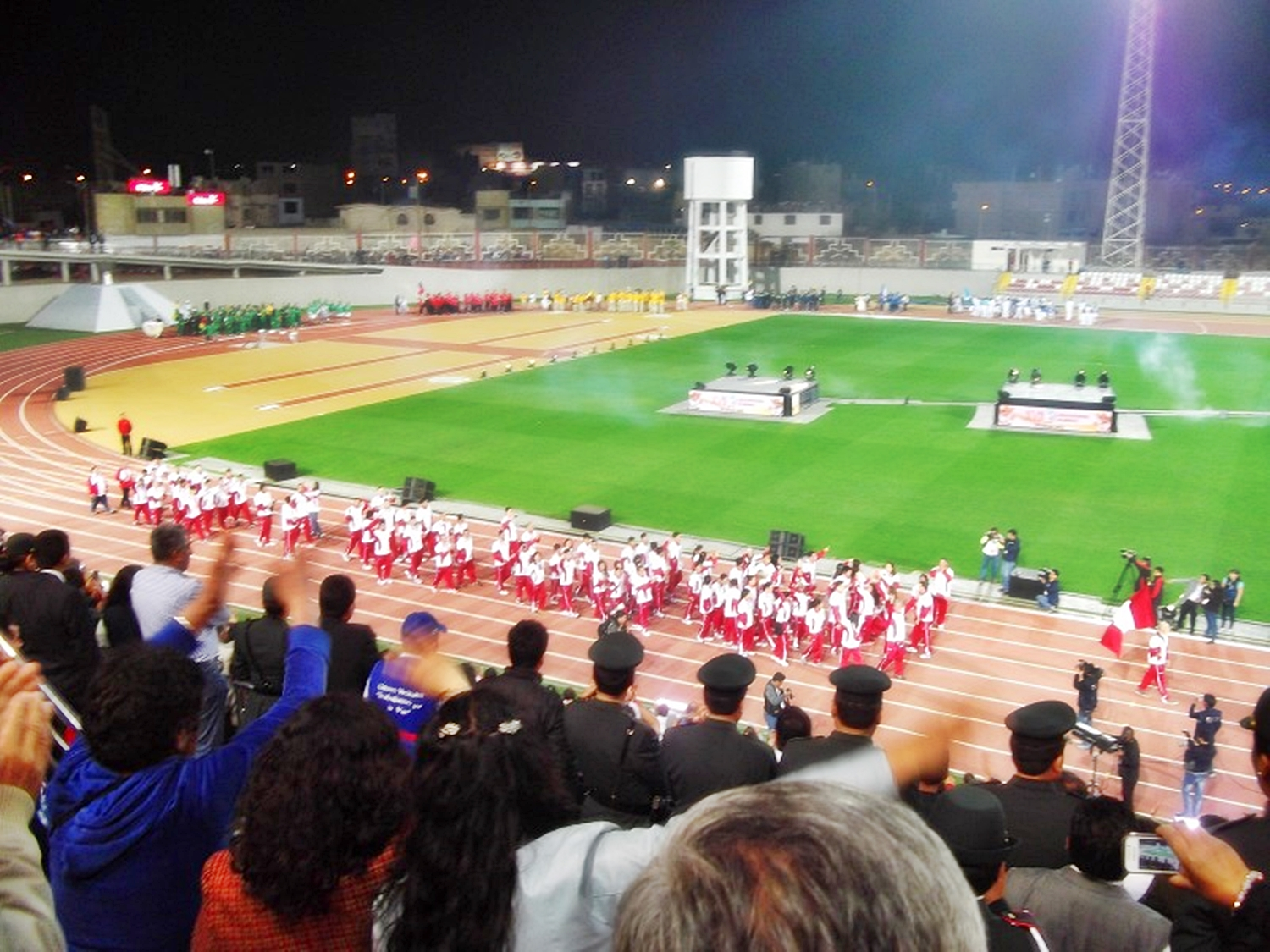
Estadio Chan Chan

== Participating teams ==
All 6 nations of ODEBO competed in these Games. For the first time in Games' history, five non-ODEBO teams was given permission to participate as well. Number in parentheses represents number of athletes for each team.

- Bolivia (355)
- Chile (388)
- Colombia (514)
- Dominican Republic** (232)
- Ecuador (578)
- El Salvador** (135)
- Guatemala** (380)
- Panama (111)
- Paraguay** (103)
- Peru (Host Nation) (795)
- Venezuela (789)

Note: ** denotes non-ODEBO team.

== Sports ==
For the 2013 Bolivarian Games, 561 events in 44 sports was contested here. These Games was the first time that rugby was played at the Bolivarian Games. Numbers in parentheses indicate the number of medal events contested in each sport.

- Aquatics
  - Diving (10)
  - Open water swimming (4)
  - Swimming (40)
  - Synchronized swimming (4)
- Archery (22)
- Athletics (47)
- Badminton (6)
- Baseball (1)
- Basketball (2)
- Basque pelota (9)
- Bowling (15)
- Boxing (13)
- Canoeing (22)
- Chess (2)
- Climbing (8)
- Cue sports (15)
- Cycling (29)
  - BMX racing (4)
  - Mountain biking (3)
  - Road racing (4)
  - Track cycling (18)
- Equestrian (6)
- Fencing (12)
- Field hockey (2)
- Football (2)
- Futsal (1)
- Golf (2)
- Gymnastics
  - Artistic gymnastics (14)
  - Rhythmic gymnastics (9)
- Handball (2)
- Inline speed skating (8)
- Judo (22)
- Karate (18)
- Racquetball (6)
- Rowing (14)
- Rugby sevens (2)
- Sailing (8)
- Shooting (34)
- Softball (1)
- Squash (7)
- Surfing (11)
- Table tennis (7)
- Taekwondo (21)
- Tennis (7)
- Triathlon (3)
- Underwater sports (12)
  - Finswimming (8)
  - Freediving (2)
  - Spearfishing (2),
- Volleyball
  - Beach volleyball (2)
  - Volleyball (2)
- Water polo (1)
- Water skiing (10)
- Weightlifting (45)
- Wrestling (21)
- Wushu (15)

== Calendar ==
| OC | Opening ceremony | ● | Event competitions | 1 | Event finals | CC | Closing ceremony |

| November 2013 | 16th Sat | 17th Sun | 18th Mon | 19th Tue | 20th Wed | 21st Thu | 22nd Fri | 23rd Sat | 24th Sun | 25th Mon | 26th Tue | 27th Wed | 28th Thu | 29th Fri | 30th Sat | Gold medals |
|---|---|---|---|---|---|---|---|---|---|---|---|---|---|---|---|---|
| Ceremonies | OC | | | | | | | | | | | | | | CC | |
| Archery | | | | | | | | | | 4 | 8 | ● | ● | 10 | | 22 |
| Artistic gymnastics | | | | 2 | 2 | 5 | 5 | | | | | | | | | 14 |
| Athletics | | | | | | | | | | | 14 | 7 | 12 | 12 | 2 | 47 |
| Badminton | | ● | 1 | ● | ● | 5 | | | | | | | | | | 6 |
| Baseball | | ● | ● | ● | ● | ● | | ● | 1 | | | | | | | 1 |
| Basketball | | ● | ● | ● | | ● | ● | 1 | ● | ● | | ● | ● | 1 | | 2 |
| Basque pelota | | | ● | ● | ● | 5 | ● | ● | | 4 | | | | | | 9 |
| Beach volleyball | | | | | | | | | | | ● | ● | ● | 2 | | 2 |
| Bowling | | | | | | | | 2 | | 2 | 3 | 8 | | | | 15 |
| Boxing | | | | | | | | | ● | ● | ● | ● | | 13 | | 13 |
| Canoeing | | 6 | 5 | 11 | | | | | | | | | | | | 22 |
| Chess | | | | ● | ● | ● | | ● | ● | 2 | | | | | | 2 |
| Climbing | | | | | | ● | 2 | ● | 2 | 4 | | | | | | 8 |
| Cue sports | | | ● | 4 | 4 | 1 | 5 | | | | | | | | | 14 |
| Cycling | | 4 | 3 | 5 | 6 | 2 | 2 | 1 | 2 | 2 | 2 | | | | | 29 |
| Diving | | | | | | 2 | 2 | 2 | 2 | 2 | | | | | | 10 |
| Equestrian | | | | | | ● | | 2 | | 1 | ● | 1 | 1 | | 1 | 6 |
| Fencing | | | 2 | 2 | 2 | 2 | 2 | 2 | | | | | | | | 12 |
| Field hockey | | | | | | ● | ● | ● | ● | | ● | ● | | ● | 2 | 2 |
| Football | | ● | ● | ● | ● | ● | ● | ● | ● | 2 | | | | | | 2 |
| Futsal | | | | | | ● | ● | ● | | ● | 1 | | | | | 1 |
| Golf | ● | ● | ● | 2 | | | | | | | | | | | | 2 |
| Handball | | ● | ● | ● | ● | 1 | | ● | ● | ● | ● | 1 | | | | 2 |
| Inline speed skating | | | | | | | | | 4 | 2 | 2 | | | | | 8 |
| Judo | | 8 | 6 | 6 | 2 | | | | | | | | | | | 22 |
| Karate | | | | | | | | | | | | 7 | 7 | 4 | | 18 |
| Open water swimming | | | | | | 2 | | 2 | | | | | | | | 4 |
| Racquetball | | | ● | ● | ● | ● | ● | 4 | 2 | | | | | | | 6 |
| Rhythmic gymnastics | | | | | | | | | | | | ● | 3 | 6 | | 9 |
| Rowing | | | | | | | ● | 7 | 7 | | | | | | | 14 |
| Rugby sevens | | ● | ● | 2 | | | | | | | | | | | | 2 |
| Sailing | | | | | | | | | ● | ● | 3 | ● | ● | 5 | | 8 |
| Shooting | | | | 4 | 8 | 6 | 6 | 10 | | | | | | | | 34 |
| Softball | | | | | | | | ● | | ● | ● | ● | ● | ● | 1 | 1 |
| Squash | | | | | | | | ● | | | 5 | ● | ● | 2 | | 7 |
| Surfing | | ● | ● | ● | ● | 1 | 10 | | | | | | | | | 11 |
| Swimming | | 10 | 10 | 10 | 10 | | | | | | | | | | | 40 |
| Synchronized swimming | | 1 | 1 | 1 | 1 | | | | | | | | | | | 4 |
| Table tennis | | | | | | | | | | ● | 2 | 3 | ● | 2 | | 7 |
| Taekwondo | | | | | | | | | | 6 | 5 | 6 | 4 | | | 21 |
| Tennis | | ● | ● | ● | 5 | ● | ● | ● | 2 | | | | | | | 7 |
| Triathlon | | | | | | | | | | 2 | | 1 | | | | 3 |
| Underwater sports | | ● | 2 | | | | 4 | 2 | | 2 | | | | 2 | | 12 |
| Volleyball | | ● | ● | ● | ● | 1 | | | | ● | ● | | ● | 1 | | 2 |
| Water polo | | | | | | | | | | ● | ● | ● | ● | ● | 1 | 1 |
| Water skiing | ● | ● | 6 | 4 | | | | | | | | | | | | 10 |
| Weightlifting | | 9 | 9 | 9 | 18 | | | | | | | | | | | 45 |
| Wrestling | | | | | | 7 | 7 | 7 | | | | | | | | 21 |
| Wushu | | 4 | ● | 11 | | | | | | | | | | | | 15 |
| Total gold medals | | 42 | 45 | 73 | 58 | 40 | 45 | 42 | 22 | 35 | 45 | 34 | 27 | 60 | 7 | 575 |
| November 2013 | 16th Sat | 17th Sun | 18th Mon | 19th Tue | 20th Wed | 21st Thu | 22nd Fri | 23rd Sat | 24th Sun | 25th Mon | 26th Tue | 27th Wed | 28th Thu | 29th Fri | 30th Sat | Gold medals |

== Medal table ==
Key:

The host country is highlighted in lavender blue

Final medal tally.

* Host nation (Peru)

| Rank | Nation | Gold | Silver | Bronze | Total |
|---|---|---|---|---|---|
| 1 | Colombia (COL) | 166 | 135 | 113 | 414 |
| 2 | Venezuela (VEN) | 161 | 168 | 128 | 457 |
| 3 | Ecuador (ECU) | 66 | 71 | 92 | 229 |
| 4 | Peru (PER)* | 61 | 61 | 104 | 226 |
| 5 | Chile (CHI) | 44 | 57 | 79 | 180 |
| 6 | Guatemala (GUA) | 18 | 23 | 35 | 76 |
| 7 | Dominican Republic (DOM) | 18 | 17 | 44 | 79 |
| 8 | Paraguay (PAR) | 9 | 7 | 8 | 24 |
| 9 | Bolivia (BOL) | 7 | 7 | 18 | 32 |
| 10 | El Salvador (ESA) | 6 | 9 | 11 | 26 |
| 11 | Panama (PAN) | 6 | 6 | 22 | 34 |
| Totals (11 entries) | | 562 | 561 | 654 | 1,777 |

== See also ==
- Pan American Games
  - Central American and Caribbean Games
  - Central American Games
  - South American Games
