= Athletics at the Bolivarian Games =

Athletics competitions have been held at the quadrennial Bolivarian Games since the inaugural edition 1938 in Bogotá, Colombia. A detailed history of the early editions of the Bolivarian Games between 1938 and 1989 including extensive lists of participating athletes and officials from Bolivia was published in a book written (in Spanish) by José Gamarra Zorrilla, former president of the Bolivian Olympic Committee, and first president (1976–1982) of ODESUR.

== Editions ==
Games	Year	Host city	Country	Events		
Games	Year	Host city	Country	Men	Women	Mixed
I	1938	Bogotá	Colombia	23	4	0
II	1947/8	Lima	Peru	23	10	0
III	1951	Caracas	Venezuela	21	7	0
IV	1961	Barranquilla	Colombia	21	9	0
V	1965	Quito	Ecuador	21	9	0
VI	1970	Maracaibo	Venezuela	22	10	0
VII	1973	Panama City	Panama	22	12	0
VIII	1977	La Paz	Bolivia	23	14	0
IX	1981	Barquisimeto	Venezuela	23	15	0
X	1985	Cuenca	Ecuador	21	16	0
XI	1989	Maracaibo	Venezuela	23	17	0
XII	1993	Cochabamba	Bolivia	24	19	0
XIII	1997	Arequipa	Peru	23	22	0
XIV	2001	Ambato	Ecuador	24	23	0
XV	2005	Armenia	Colombia	24	23	0
XVI	2009	Sucre	Bolivia	24	23	0
XVII	2013	Trujillo	Peru	24	23	0
XVIII	2017	Santa Marta	Colombia	24	23	0
XIX	2022	Valledupar	Colombia	21	22	1
XX	2024	Ayacucho	Peru	1	1	1
XXI	2025	Lima	Peru			

== Medals ==
Medal winners for the athletics events of the Bolivarian Games from 1938 to 2005 were published.

== See also ==
List of Bolivarian Games records in athletics
