= Football at the Bolivarian Games =

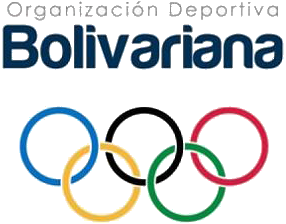
- Organiser(s): ODEBO
- Founded: 1938; 88 years ago
- Region: South America
- Teams: 4 (men); 4 (women)
- Related competitions: South American Games
- Current champions: Paraguay (men); Colombia (women)
- Most championships: Peru (men) (6 titles); Colombia (women) (4 titles)
- Website: bolivarianosr.com/futbol

Football at the Bolivarian Games has been played since 1938. The first edition was the only one in which full national teams played for all countries. The tournament is organisedc by Organización Deportiva Bolivariana (English: Bolivarian Sport Organization).

U-17 teams have been fielded recently in this quadrennial competition. A women's tournament played by full national teams was added in 2005.

== Men's tournament ==
=== Results ===
Tournament age limits

- 1938: senior teams
- 1947–81: amateur teams
- 1985: under-20
- Since 1993: under-17

Ed.	Year	Host	(gold) Champion	(silver) Runner-up	(bronze) Third	Num. teams
1	1938	Colombia	Peru	Bolivia	Ecuador	5
2	1947–48	Peru	Peru	Bolivia; Venezuela	—N/a	3
3	1951	Venezuela	Colombia	Venezuela	Peru	5
4	1961	Colombia	Peru	Colombia	Venezuela	4
5	1965	Ecuador	Ecuador	Venezuela	Bolivia	4
6	1970	Venezuela	Bolivia	Venezuela	Panama	3
7	1973	Panama	Peru	Colombia	Bolivia; Panama	4
8	1977	Bolivia	Bolivia	Venezuela	Peru	3
9	1981	Venezuela	Peru	Colombia	Venezuela	4
10	1985	Ecuador	Ecuador	Colombia	Peru	3
11	1989	Venezuela	No tournament held			
12	1993	Bolivia	Bolivia	Colombia	Venezuela	5
13	1997	Peru	Colombia	Peru	Venezuela	5
14	2001	Ecuador	Peru	Colombia	Venezuela	5
15	2005	Colombia	Colombia	Venezuela	Ecuador	4
16	2009	Bolivia	Bolivia	Ecuador	Venezuela	3
17	2013	Peru	Colombia	Ecuador	Peru	6
18	2017	Colombia	Colombia	Ecuador	Venezuela	5
19	2022	Colombia	Paraguay	Bolivia	Colombia	4
20	2024	Peru	No tournament held			
21	2025	Peru	No tournament held			
22	2029	Colombia	To be determined			

=== Medal count ===
Men's Football at the Bolivarian Games Medal Count
Rank	Team	Gold	Silver	Bronze	Total
1	Peru	6	1	4	11
2	Colombia	5	6	1	12
3	Bolivia	4	3	2	9
4	Ecuador	2	3	2	7
5	Paraguay	1	0	0	1
6	Venezuela	0	6	7	13
7	Panama	0	0	2	2

=== Details ===
==== I Games ====
(Bogotá, 1938)

This was the only edition in which full national teams participated for every country.

Team	Pts	Pld	W	D	L	GF	GA
Peru	8	4	4	0	0	18	4
Bolivia	5	4	2	1	1	6	6
Ecuador	5	4	2	1	1	9	13
Colombia	2	4	1	0	3	6	8
Venezuela	0	4	0	0	4	4	12

BOL	1–1	ECU	COL	2–0	VEN
PER	4–2	COL	PER	3–0	BOL
ECU	2–1	COL	BOL	2–1	COL
BOL	3–1	VEN	PER	2–1	VEN
PER	9–1	ECU	ECU	5–2	VEN
Silver medal playoff:			BOL	2–1	ECU

==== II Games ====
(Lima, 1947–48)

There was a tie for second place and two silver medals were awarded. Only Bolivia and Venezuela fielded full national teams.

Team	Pts	Pld	W	D	L	GF	GA
Peru	4	2	2	0	0	2	0
Bolivia	1	2	0	1	1	2	3
Venezuela	1	2	0	1	1	2	3

VEN	2–2	BOL
PER	1–0	BOL
PER	1–0	VEN

==== III Games ====
(Caracas, 1951)

Team	Pts	Pld	W	D	L	GF	GA
Colombia	6	4	3	0	1	6	4
Venezuela	5	4	2	1	1	11	6
Peru	5	4	2	1	1	6	4
Panama	4	4	2	0	2	6	8
Ecuador	0	4	0	0	4	3	10

COL	1–0	PER	PER	2–1	PAN
PAN	2–1	ECU	COL	2–1	ECU
VEN	2–2	PER	VEN	4–1	PAN
PAN	2–1	COL	PER	2–0	ECU
VEN	4–1	ECU	COL	2–1	VEN

==== IV Games ====
(Barranquilla, 1961)

Team	Pts	Pld	W	D	L	GF	GA
Peru	12	6	6	0	0	13	6
Colombia	7	6	3	1	2	8	8
Venezuela	5	6	2	1	3	13	9
Panama	0	6	2	0	6	5	16

PER	3–2	COL	PER	1–0	VEN
VEN	6–2	PAN	COL	1–0	PAN
PER	2–1	VEN	PER	2–0	COL
COL	1–0	PAN	VEN	3–0	PAN
PER	3–2	PAN	COL	2–1	VEN
VEN	2–2	COL	PER	2–1	PAN

==== V Games ====
(Quito/Guayaquil, 1965)

Team	Pts	Pld	W	D	L	GF	GA
Ecuador	10	6	5	0	1	11	3
Venezuela	6	6	3	0	3	8	7
Bolivia	6	6	3	0	3	7	7
Panama	2	6	1	0	5	3	12

BOL	1–0	PAN	BOL	3–0	PAN
ECU	0–1	VEN	ECU	2–1	VEN
VEN	3–1	BOL	BOL	2–0	VEN
ECU	2–0	PAN	ECU	3–1	PAN
PAN	1–0	VEN	VEN	3–1	PAN
ECU	2–0	BOL	ECU	2–0	BOL
Silver medal playoff:
VEN	2–2	BOL	(2–1 p)

==== VI Games ====
(Maracaibo, 1970)

Team	Pts	Pld	W	D	L	GF	GA
Bolivia	6	4	2	2	0	6	4
Venezuela	5	4	2	1	1	4	2
Panama	1	4	0	1	3	3	7

VEN	2–0	PAN	VEN	1–0	PAN
BOL	3–2	PAN	BOL	1–1	PAN
BOL	1–0	VEN	BOL	1–1	VEN

==== VII Games ====
(Panama City, 1973)

There was a tie for third place and two bronze medals were awarded.

Team	Pts	Pld	W	D	L	GF	GA
Peru	9	6	4	1	1	17	3
Colombia	7	6	3	1	2	11	7
Bolivia	4	6	2	0	4	11	20
Panama	4	6	2	0	4	7	16

PER	0–0	COL	PER	1–0	COL
BOL	3–1	PAN	PAN	3–2	BOL
COL	3–0	PAN	COL	4–2	PAN
PER	6–2	BOL	PER	6–0	BOL
COL	2–1	BOL	BOL	3–2	COL
PER	4–0	PAN	PAN	1–0	PER

==== VIII Games ====
(La Paz, 1977)

Team	Pts	Pld	W	D	L	GF	GA
Bolivia	6	4	2	2	0	4	2
Venezuela	4	4	1	2	1	6	6
Peru	2	4	0	2	2	3	5

VEN	2–1	PER	VEN	2–2	PER
BOL	1–0	VEN	BOL	2–2	VEN
BOL	0–0	PER	BOL	1–0	PER

==== IX Games ====
(Barquisimeto, 1981)

Team	Pts	Pld	W	D	L	GF	GA
Peru	5	3	2	1	0	6	2
Colombia	3	3	1	1	1	5	3
Bolivia	2	3	1	0	2	2	7
Venezuela	2	3	0	2	1	3	4

PER	1–1	VEN	PER	3–0	BOL
COL	3–0	BOL	BOL	2–1	VEN
COL	1–1	VEN	PER	2–1	COL

==== X Games ====
(Ambato/Cuenca/Puerto Viejo, 1985)

The competition featured only U-20 teams for the first time.

Team	Pts	Pld	W	D	L	GF	GA
Ecuador	7	4	3	1	0	7	1
Colombia	4	4	1	2	1	2	2
Peru	1	4	0	1	3	2	8

ECU	0–0	COL	ECU	1–0	COL
COL	1–0	PER	COL	1–1	PER
ECU	3–0	PER	ECU	3–1	PER

==== XI Games ====
(Maracaibo, 1989)

A dispute about which level of teams should be fielded led to the cancellation of the football tournament.

==== XII Games ====
(Santa Cruz/Cochambamba, 1993)

The competition featured only U-17 teams for the first time.

Team	Pts	Pld	W	D	L	GF	GA
Bolivia	6	4	3	0	1	7	3
Colombia	5	4	2	1	1	6	3
Venezuela	5	4	2	1	1	6	5
Peru	3	4	1	1	2	4	9
Ecuador	1	4	0	1	3	5	8

PER	2–1	ECU	BOL	2–1	ECU
VEN	1–0	BOL	COL	3–0	PER
COL	1–1	ECU	VEN	3–2	ECU
BOL	3–0	PER	VEN	2–2	PER
COL	1–0	VEN	BOL	2–1	COL

==== XIII Games ====
(Arequipa, 1997)

Team	Pts	Pld	W	D	L	GF	GA
Colombia	9	4	3	0	1	10	5
Peru	8	4	2	2	0	6	4
Venezuela	5	4	1	2	1	8	7
Bolivia	3	4	1	0	3	7	12
Ecuador	2	4	0	2	2	4	7

VEN	5–2	BOL	VEN	0–0	ECU
PER	0–0	ECU	BOL	4–2	ECU
COL	3–1	VEN	PER	2–1	COL
PER	2–1	BOL	COL	3–0	BOL
COL	3–2	ECU	PER	2–2	VEN

==== XIV Games ====
(Ambato, 2001)

Team	Pts	Pld	W	D	L	GF	GA
Peru	7	4	2	1	1	8	8
Colombia	6	4	1	3	0	4	3
Venezuela	5	4	1	2	1	6	6
Ecuador	5	4	1	2	1	3	4
Bolivia	3	4	1	0	3	6	6

COL	1–1	VEN	ECU	0–0	COL
ECU	2–1	BOL	VEN	2–1	BOL
PER	3–2	VEN	ECU	0–2	PER
COL	1–0	BOL	PER	2–2	COL
BOL	4–1	PER	ECU	1–1	VEN

==== XV Games ====
(Armenia/Pereira, 2005)

Team	Pts	Pld	W	D	L	GF	GA
Colombia	9	3	3	0	0	8	0
Ecuador	4	3	1	1	1	4	4
Venezuela	4	3	1	1	1	4	4
Bolivia	0	3	0	0	3	2	10

ECU	1–1	VEN	COL	2–0	VEN
COL	4–0	BOL	VEN	3–1	BOL
ECU	3–1	BOL	COL	2–0	ECU

Semifinals
1	Colombia	3
4	Bolivia	0
2	Venezuela	2
2	Ecuador	1

Finals
1	Colombia	1
2	Venezuela	0
Bronze medal match
2	Ecuador (p)	1 (6)
4	Bolivia	1 (5)

==== XVI Games ====
(Sucre, 2009)

Team	Pts	Pld	W	D	L	GF	GA
Bolivia	7	4	2	1	1	6	5
Ecuador	7	4	2	1	1	4	3
Venezuela	2	4	0	2	2	4	6

BOL	2–2	VEN	ECU	1–0	VEN
ECU	2–0	BOL	BOL	2–1	VEN
VEN	1–1	ECU	BOL	2–0	ECU

==== XVII Games ====
(Trujillo, 2013)

Group A

Team	Pts	Pld	W	D	L	GF	GA
Peru	4	2	1	1	0	2	1
Guatemala	2	2	0	2	0	2	2
Venezuela	1	2	0	1	1	1	2

PER	1–1	GUA
GUA	1–1	VEN
PER	1–0	VEN

Group B

Team	Pts	Pld	W	D	L	GF	GA
Colombia	4	2	1	1	0	7	2
Ecuador	4	2	1	1	0	7	4
Bolivia	0	2	0	0	2	2	10

BOL	0–5	COL
ECU	5–2	BOL
ECU	2–2	COL
Fifth place match:			BOL	2–1	VEN

Semifinals
1B	Colombia	1
2A	Guatemala	0
2B	Ecuador	3
1A	Peru	2

Finals
1B	Colombia	3
2B	Ecuador	1
Bronze medal match
1A	Peru	3
2A	Guatemala	0

==== XVIII Games ====
(Santa Marta, 2017)

Team	Pts	Pld	W	D	L	GF	GA
Ecuador	8	4	2	2	0	9	2
Colombia	8	4	2	2	0	4	1
Bolivia	5	4	1	2	1	6	7
Venezuela	4	4	1	1	2	3	5
El Salvador	1	4	0	1	3	3	10

ECU	2–2	VEN	COL	1–1	ESA
ECU	4–0	ESA	COL	1–1	BOL
BOL	2–0	VEN	COL	0–0	ECU
ECU	3–0	BOL	VEN	1–0	ESA
ESA	3–3	BOL	COL	1–0	VEN

Finals
2	Colombia (p)	2 (5)
1	Ecuador	2 (4)
Bronze medal match
4	Venezuela	2
3	Bolivia	0

==== XIX Games ====
(Valledupar, 2022)

Team	Pts	Pld	W	D	L	GF	GA
Paraguay	9	3	3	0	0	8	5
Bolivia	6	3	2	0	1	7	3
Colombia	3	3	1	0	2	5	3
Dominican Republic	0	3	0	0	3	6	15

DOM	1–5	BOL	COL	0–1	PAR
PAR	5–4	DOM	COL	0–1	BOL
COL	5–1	DOM	BOL	1–2	PAR

==== XX Games & XXI Games ====
(Ayacucho, 2024) & (Ayacucho/Lima, 2025)

There was no football tournament at the 2024 and 2025 Bolivarian Games due to serious issues with sports infrastructure and poor organization by the Organizing Committee and the Peruvian State.

== Women's tournament ==
=== Results ===
Tournament age limits

- 2005–09: senior teams
- Since 2013: under-20

Ed.	Year	Host	(gold) Champion	(silver) Runner-up	(bronze) Third	Num. teams
1	2005	Colombia	Peru	Colombia	Ecuador	5
2	2009	Bolivia	Colombia	Ecuador	Venezuela	5
3	2013	Peru	Colombia	Venezuela	Bolivia	8
4	2017	Colombia	Colombia	Ecuador	Venezuela	5
5	2022	Colombia	Colombia	Paraguay	Venezuela	4
6	2024	Peru	No tournament held			
7	2025	Peru	No tournament held			
8	2029	Colombia	To be determined			

=== Medal count ===
Women's Football at the Bolivarian Games Medal Count
Rank	Team	Gold	Silver	Bronze	Total
1	Colombia	4	1	0	5
2	Peru	1	0	0	1
3	Ecuador	0	2	1	3
4	Venezuela	0	1	3	4
5	Paraguay	0	1	0	1
6	Bolivia	0	0	1	1

=== Details ===
==== XV Games ====
(Armenia/Pereira, 2005)

Team	Pts	Pld	W	D	L	GF	GA
Peru	12	4	4	0	0	13	1
Colombia	9	4	3	0	1	11	4
Ecuador	4	4	1	1	2	3	10
Bolivia	3	4	1	0	3	4	9
Venezuela	1	4	0	1	3	3	10

PER	5–1	VEN	COL	0–2	PER
COL	3–1	BOL	ECU	0–0	VEN
COL	3–1	VEN	PER	2–0	BOL
PER	4–0	ECU	BOL	2–1	VEN
ECU	3–1	BOL	COL	5–0	ECU

Semifinals
1	Peru	3
4	Bolivia	0
2	Colombia	1
3	Ecuador	0

Finals
1	Peru	3
2	Colombia	0
Bronze medal match
3	Ecuador	3
4	Bolivia	2

==== XVI Games ====
(Sucre, 2009)

Team	Pts	Pld	W	D	L	GF	GA
Colombia	12	4	4	0	0	10	3
Ecuador	9	4	3	0	1	7	2
Venezuela	6	4	2	0	2	6	6
Bolivia	1	4	0	1	3	5	10
Peru	1	4	0	1	3	4	11

COL	3–1	PER	ECU	2–0	BOL
COL	2–0	VEN	PER	2–2	PER
COL	1–0	ECU	PER	1–3	VEN
PER	0–3	ECU	BOL	1–2	VEN
ECU	2–1	VEN	COL	4–2	BOL

==== XVII Games ====
(Trujillo, 2013)

The competition featured only U-20 teams for the first time.

Group A

Team	Pts	Pld	W	D	L	GF	GA
Bolivia	9	3	3	0	0	4	1
Ecuador	4	3	1	1	1	3	2
Peru	4	3	1	1	1	3	3
Dominican Republic	0	3	0	0	3	2	6

PER	2–1	DOM	BOL	1–0	ECU
PER	1–1	ECU	BOL	2–1	DOM
PER	0–1	BOL	ECU	2–0	DOM

Group B

Team	Pts	Pld	W	D	L	GF	GA
Colombia	7	3	2	1	0	7	3
Venezuela	6	3	2	0	1	11	5
Chile	4	2	1	1	1	5	9
Guatemala	0	3	0	0	3	3	9

CHI	2–2	COL	VEN	4–2	GUA
GUA	0–3	COL	CHI	1–6	VEN
CHI	2–1	GUA	COL	2–1	VEN

Semifinals
1B	Colombia	2
2A	Ecuador	0
2B	Venezuela	3
1A	Bolivia	2

Finals
1B	Colombia (p)	2 (5)
2B	Venezuela	2 (4)
Bronze medal match
1A	Bolivia (p)	1 (3)
2A	Ecuador	1 (1)

==== XVIII Games ====
(Santa Marta, 2017)

Team	Pts	Pld	W	D	L	GF	GA
Colombia	10	4	3	1	0	17	1
Ecuador	7	4	2	1	1	5	8
Venezuela	5	4	1	2	1	3	4
Bolivia	4	4	1	1	2	3	8
Peru	1	4	0	1	3	3	8

PER	0–0	VEN	COL	5–0	BOL
BOL	2–1	PER	COL	8–0	ECU
ECU	2–0	VEN	COL	3–0	PER
ECU	3–0	PER	VEN	2–1	BOL
ECU	0–0	BOL	COL	1–1	VEN

Finals
1	Colombia	3
2	Ecuador	1
Bronze medal match
3	Venezuela	2
4	Bolivia	0

==== XIX Games ====
(Valledupar, 2022)

Team	Pts	Pld	W	D	L	GF	GA
Colombia	9	3	3	0	0	11	1
Paraguay	4	3	1	1	1	3	4
Venezuela	4	3	1	1	1	2	3
Panama	0	3	0	0	3	1	9

PAR	0–0	VEN	COL	4–1	PAN
PAN	0–2	VEN	COL	4–0	PAR
PAR	3–0	PAN	COL	3–0	VEN

==== XX Games & XXI Games ====
(Ayacucho, 2024) & (Ayacucho/Lima, 2025)

No football tournament was held during the 2024 and 2025 Bolivarian Games.
