= Colombia national under-23 football team =

National association football team

Colombia Olympic
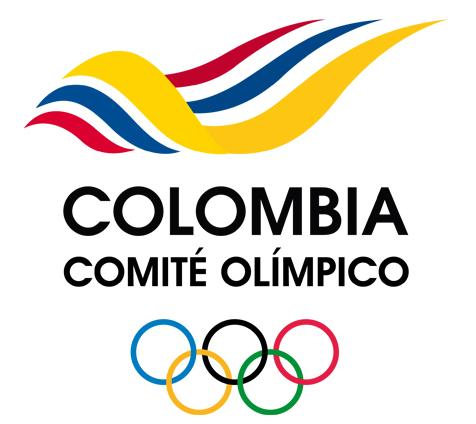
- Nickname: Los Cafeteros (The Coffee growers)
- Association: Federación Colombiana de Fútbol (FCF)
- Confederation: CONMEBOL (South America)
- Head coach: Héctor Cárdenas
- FIFA code: COL
First colours	Second colours

First international
- Guatemala 2–1 Colombia (Guatemala City, Guatemala; 26 February 1950)

Biggest win
- Colombia 7–1 Dominican Republic (Cali, Colombia; 3 August 1971); Colombia 6–0 Bahamas (Cali, Colombia; 31 July 1971)

Biggest defeat
- Brazil 9–0 Colombia (Londrina, Brazil; 30 January 2000)

Olympic Games
- Appearances: 5 (first in 1968)
- Best result: Quarter-finals (2016)
Medal record
Pan American Games
Silver medal – second place	1971 Cali	Team
Bronze medal – third place	1995 Mar del Plata	Team
Central American and Caribbean Games
Bronze medal – third place	1954 Mexico City	Team
Bronze medal – third place	1970 Panama City	Team
South American Games
Silver medal – second place	1986 Santiago	Team
Bolivarian Games
Gold medal – first place	1951 Caracas	Team
Silver medal – second place	1961 Barranquilla	Team
Silver medal – second place	1973 Panama City	Team
Silver medal – second place	1981 Barquisimeto	Team

The Colombia national under-23 football team represents Colombia at the Summer Olympic Games and in international under-23 football competitions and is overseen by the Colombian Football Federation.

The team played its first match in 1950. From that year to 1992 the team played as a Colombia national amateur football team. Since 1992, the team played as Colombia national under-23 football team until 2004, when the qualification for the Olympic Games was changed to South American Youth Football Championship for under-20 teams (before this, the qualification tournament was CONMEBOL Men Pre-Olympic Tournament). The team was inactive since 2004, however with the qualification to the 2016 Summer Olympics qualification play-off the team was resurrected.

== Competitive record ==
*Draws include knockout matches decided on penalty kicks.
**Gold background colour indicates that the tournament was won.
***Red border colour indicates tournament was held on home soil.

Champions Runners-up Third Place Fourth Place

=== Olympic Games ===
Olympic Games record
Year	Round	Position	Pld	W	D*	L	GF	GA
(France) 1900	did not participate							
(United States) 1904	did not participate							
(United Kingdom) 1908	did not participate							
(Sweden) 1912	did not participate							
(Belgium) 1920	did not participate							
(France) 1924	did not participate							
(Netherlands) 1928	did not participate							
(Nazi Germany) 1936	did not participate							
(United Kingdom) 1948	did not participate							
(Finland) 1952	did not enter							
(Australia) 1956	did not enter							
(Italy) 1960	did not qualify							
(Japan) 1964	did not qualify							
(Mexico) 1968	First stage	10th	3	1	0	2	4	5
(Germany) 1972	First stage	11th	3	1	0	2	5	12
(Canada) 1976	did not qualify							
(Soviet Union) 1980	First stage	11th	3	1	1	1	2	4
(United States) 1984	did not qualify							
(South Korea) 1988	did not qualify							
(Spain) 1992	First stage	14th	3	0	1	2	4	9
(United States) 1996	did not qualify							
(Australia) 2000	did not qualify							
(Greece) 2004	did not qualify							
(China) 2008	did not qualify							
(United Kingdom) 2012	did not qualify							
(Brazil) 2016	Quarter-finals	7th	4	1	2	1	6	6
(Japan) 2020	did not qualify							
(France) 2024	did not qualify							
Total	Quarter-finals	5/26	16	4	4	8	21	36

=== CONMEBOL Men Pre-Olympic Tournament ===
Year	Round	Position	Pld	W	D*	L	GF	GA
(Peru) 1960	First stage	10th	2	1	0	1	3	7
(Peru) 1964	Fourth place	4th	6	1	2	3	6	10
(Colombia) 1968	Runners-up	2nd	6	4	1	1	10	7
(Colombia) 1972	Runners-up	2nd	7	2	5	0	7	4
(Brazil) 1976	Fourth place	4th	5	1	2	2	5	9
(Colombia) 1980	Runners-up	2nd	6	3	1	2	10	5
(Ecuador) 1984	First stage	5th	2	0	0	2	1	5
(Bolivia) 1988	Fourth place	4th	7	4	1	2	7	4
(Paraguay) 1992	Runners-up	2nd	7	4	2	1	14	3
(Argentina) 1996	Fourth place	4th	4	0	2	2	6	11
(Brazil) 2000	First stage	6th	4	2	1	1	10	13
(Chile) 2004	Playoffs	6th	5	2	0	3	7	9
(Colombia) 2020	Fourth place	4th	7	2	2	3	10	9
(Venezuela) 2024	First stage	10th	4	0	0	4	0	8
Total	Runners-up	14/14	72	26	19	27	96	100

=== Pan American Games ===
Pan American Games record
Year	Round	Position	Pld	W	D*	L	GF	GA
(Argentina) 1951	did not participate							
(Mexico) 1955	did not participate							
(United States) 1959	did not participate							
(Brazil) 1963	did not participate							
(Canada) 1967	Preliminary round	8th	3	0	0	3	2	13
(Colombia) 1971	Silver medal	2nd	8	5	2	1	21	7
(Mexico) 1975	did not participate							
(Puerto Rico) 1979	did not participate							
(Venezuela) 1983	did not participate							
(United States) 1987	Preliminary round	11th	3	0	1	2	1	4
(Cuba) 1991	did not participate							
(Argentina) 1995	Bronze medal	3rd	6	4	0	2	13	5
(Canada) 1999	did not participate							
(Dominican Republic) 2003	Fourth place	4th	5	2	1	2	6	7
(Brazil) 2007	Preliminary round	7th	3	1	1	1	1	1
(Mexico) 2011	did not participate							
(Canada) 2015	did not participate							
(Peru) 2019	did not participate							
(Chile) 2023	Sixth place	6th	4	1	1	2	2	4
Total	Silver medal	7/19	32	13	6	13	46	41

== Schedule and results ==
Win Draw Loss

=== 2026 ===
30 July CACG GS	Panama	0–1	Colombia	Moca, Dominican Republic
14:00		Report	K. González 82'	Stadium: Estadio Complejo Deportivo Moca 86; Referee: Melvin Matamoros (Honduras)

1 August CACG GS	Colombia	1–0	Cuba	Santiago de los Caballeros, Dominican Republic
18:00	Marulanda 70'	Report		Stadium: Estadio Cibao FC; Referee: Akil Weekes (Trinidad and Tobago)

3 August CACG GS	Costa Rica	1–1	Colombia	Santiago de los Caballeros, Dominican Republic
16:00	Salazar 10'	Report	Marulanda 8'	Stadium: Estadio Cibao FC; Referee: Jordan Chaibrant (Guadeloupe)

5 August CACG SF	Colombia	0–1	Venezuela	Moca, Dominican Republic
19:00		Report	Hernández 82'	Stadium: Estadio Complejo Deportivo Moca 86; Referee: Roger Vindas (Costa Rica)

7 August CACG TP	Panama	1–1 (a.e.t.) (3–2 p)	Colombia	Santiago de los Caballeros, Dominican Republic
15:00	Ryce 51'	Report	Arango 70'	Stadium: Estadio Cibao FC; Referee: Juan Manuel Morales (Guatemala)
	Penalties
	Ryce (penalty scored); Pérez (penalty scored); Quintero (penalty missed); Bernal (penalty missed); Díaz (penalty scored)		(penalty missed) Marulanda; (penalty missed) Socarras; (penalty missed) Chinchia; (penalty scored) Palacios; (penalty scored) Arrechea

== Players ==
=== Current squad ===
The following players were called up for the 2024 CONMEBOL Pre-Olympic Tournament. On 11 January, forwards Kener Valencia and Edwin Mosquera were ruled out due to injuries and were replaced by Nelson Quiñones and Alejandro García, respectively.

Caps and goals updated as 18 January 2024.

No.	Pos.	Player	Date of birth (age)	Caps	Goals	Club
1	GK	Sebastián Guerra	8 January 2001 (aged 22)			(United States Soccer Federation) Atlanta United FC
2	DF	Cristian Devenish (captain)	25 January 2001 (aged 21)			(Colombian Football Federation) Atlético Nacional
3	DF	Juan David Mosquera	5 September 2002 (aged 20)			(United States Soccer Federation) Portland Timbers
4	DF	Fernando Álvarez	24 August 2003 (aged 19)			(Canadian Soccer Association) CF Montréal
5	MF	Josen Escobar	12 December 2004 (aged 18)			(Colombian Football Federation) América de Cali
6	MF	Nelson Palacio	16 June 2001 (aged 21)			(United States Soccer Federation) Real Salt Lake
7	MF	Juan Castilla	27 July 2004 (aged 18)			(Colombian Football Federation) Deportivo Pasto
8	DF	Brayan Ceballos	24 May 2001 (aged 21)			(United States Soccer Federation) New England Revolution
9	FW	Óscar Perea	27 September 2005 (aged 17)			(Colombian Football Federation) Atlético Nacional
10	MF	Daniel Ruiz	30 July 2001 (aged 21)			(Colombian Football Federation) Millonarios
11	FW	Andrés Gómez	12 September 2002 (aged 20)			(United States Soccer Federation) Real Salt Lake
12	GK	Alejandro Rodríguez	12 January 2001 (aged 22)			(Colombian Football Federation) Deportivo Cali
13	GK	Luis Marquinez	10 April 2003 (aged 19)			(Colombian Football Federation) Atlético Nacional
14	MF	Yani Quintero	17 July 2002 (aged 20)			(Colombian Football Federation) Deportes Quindío
15	MF	Jimer Fory	24 May 2002 (aged 20)			(United States Soccer Federation) Portland Timbers
16	DF	Devan Tanton	3 January 2004 (aged 19)			(The Football Association) Fulham
17	FW	Alejandro García	28 February 2001 (aged 21)			(Colombian Football Federation) Once Caldas
18	MF	Jhojan Torres	12 January 2003 (aged 20)			(Colombian Football Federation) Santa Fe
19	FW	Carlos Cortés	17 September 2001 (aged 21)			(Colombian Football Federation) Cortuluá
20	FW	Óscar Cortés	3 December 2003 (aged 19)			(French Football Federation) Lens
21	FW	Brahian Palacios	24 November 2002 (aged 20)			(Colombian Football Federation) Atlético Nacional
22	FW	Nelson Quiñones	20 August 2002 (aged 20)			(United States Soccer Federation) Houston Dynamo FC
23	DF	Samuel Velásquez	29 May 2003 (aged 19)			(Colombian Football Federation) Atlético Nacional

== Honours ==
- Pan American Games:
  - (silver) Silver Medalists (1): 1971
  - (bronze) Bronze Medalists (1): 1995
- CONMEBOL Pre-Olympic Tournament:
  - Runners-up (4): 1968, 1971, 1980, 1992
  - Fourth place (4): 1964, 1976, 1987, 2020
- Central American and Caribbean Games
  - (gold) Gold Medalists (3): 1946, 2006, 2018
  - (silver) Silver Medalists (1): 2014
  - (bronze) Bronze Medalists (3): 1938, 1954, 1970
- South American Games:
  - (gold) Gold Medalists (3): 1994, 2010, 2014
  - (silver) Silver Medalists (1): 1986
  - (bronze) Bronze Medalists (2): 1990, 2018
- Bolivarian Games
  - (gold) Gold Medalists (5): 1951, 1997, 2005, 2013, 2017
  - (silver) Silver Medalists (6): 1961, 1973, 1981, 1985, 1993, 2001

=== Friendlies ===
- Torneo de las Americas:
  - Winners: 1994

== See also ==
- Colombia national football team
- Colombia national futsal team
- Colombia national under-20 football team
- Colombia national under-17 football team
- Colombia national under-15 football team
