= Luis Lucumí =

Colombian former javelin thrower (born 1958)

Personal information
- Nationality: Colombia
- Born: Luis Carlos Lucumí; 25 December 1958 (age 67)

Sport
- Sport: Athletics
Medal record
Pan American Games
Bronze medal – third place	1991 Havana	Javelin
Central American and Caribbean Games
Gold medal – first place	1993 Ponce	Javelin
Southern Cross Games
Gold medal – first place	1982 Santa Fe	Javelin
Bolivarian Games
Gold medal – first place	1989 Maracaibo	Javelin
Gold medal – first place	1993 Cochabamba	Javelin
Gold medal – first place	1997 Arequipa	Javelin
Silver medal – second place	1981 Barquisimeto	Javelin

Luis Carlos Lucumí (born 25 December 1958) is a Colombian former javelin thrower.

Lucumí had a personal best throw of 77.80m, set when he won the 1989 South American Championships in Medellín, which remained a South American record for six years. He was a bronze medalist at the 1991 Pan American Games, won gold at the 1993 Central American and Caribbean Games and was a three-time Bolivarian Games champion.

== International competitions ==
Year	Competition	Venue	Position	Event	Notes
Representing Colombia
1981	South American Championships	La Paz, Bolivia	2nd	Javelin throw (old)	70.22 m
1981	Bolivarian Games	Barquisimeto, Venezuela	1st	Javelin throw (old)	71.12 m
1982	Southern Cross Games	Santa Fe, Argentina	1st	Javelin throw (old)	77.98 m
1985	South American Championships	Santiago, Chile	2nd	Javelin throw (old)	70.64 m
1987	Central American and Caribbean Championships	Caracas, Venezuela	1st	Javelin throw	72.46 m
1987	Pan American Games	Indianapolis, United States	6th	Javelin throw	68.06 m
1989	Bolivarian Games	Maracaibo, Venezuela	1st	Javelin throw	71.12 m
1989	South American Championships	Medellín, Colombia	1st	Javelin throw	77.80 m
1990	Ibero-American Championships	Manaus, Brazil	1st	Javelin throw	72.74 m
1990	Central American and Caribbean Games	Mexico City, Mexico	4th	Javelin throw	74.82 m
1991	South American Championships	Manaus, Brazil	1st	Javelin throw	74.42 m
1991	Pan American Games	Havana, Cuba	3rd	Javelin throw	77.38 m
1991	World Championships	Tokyo, Japan	35th (q)	Javelin throw	70.48 m
1992	Ibero-American Championships	Seville, Spain	2nd	Javelin throw	74.74 m
1993	Bolivarian Games	Cochabamba, Bolivia	1st	Javelin throw	73.26 m
1993	Central American and Caribbean Championships	Cali, Colombia	1st	Javelin throw	73.54 m
1993	Central American and Caribbean Games	Ponce, Puerto Rico	1st	Javelin throw	74.58 m
1994	Ibero-American Championships	Mar del Plata, Argentina	1st	Javelin throw	75.40 m
1995	South American Championships	Manaus, Brazil	1st	Javelin throw	76.82 m
1996	Ibero-American Championships	Medellín, Colombia	4th	Javelin throw	73.68 m
1997	South American Championships	Mar del Plata, Argentina	3rd	Javelin throw	74.00 m
1997	Bolivarian Games	Arequipa, Peru	1st	Javelin throw	74.72 m
1998	Central American and Caribbean Games	Maracaibo, Venezuela	5th	Javelin throw	72.04 m
1999	South American Championships	Bogotá, Colombia	2nd	Javelin throw	73.58 m
2000	Ibero-American Championships	Rio de Janeiro, Brazil	6th	Javelin throw	65.20 m
