= Asnoldo Devonish =

Venezuelan athlete (1932–1997)

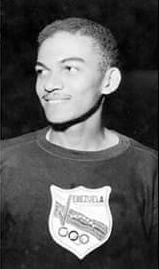
- Devonish in his 1952 Olympics kit (uniform)

Personal information
- Full name: Asnoldo Vicente Devonish Romero
- Born: June 15, 1932 Maracaibo, Zulia, Venezuela
- Died: January 1, 1997 (aged 64) Caracas, Venezuela
- Height: 187 cm (6 ft 2 in)
- Weight: 70 kg (154 lb)
Medal record
Men's athletics
Representing Venezuela
Olympic Games
Bronze medal – third place	1952 Helsinki	Triple jump
Pan American Games
Silver medal – second place	1955 Mexico City	Triple jump
Bolivarian Games
Gold medal – first place	1951 Caracas	Long jump
Gold medal – first place	1951 Caracas	Triple jump
Gold medal – first place	1961 Barranquilla	Triple jump

Asnoldo Vicente Devonish Romero (June 15, 1932 – January 1, 1997) was a Venezuelan track and field athlete who won the first Olympic medal for his native country.

At the 1952 Summer Olympics in Helsinki, he finished third in the Men's Triple Jump Final, with a distance of 15 metres and 52 centimetres, behind Adhemar da Silva (Brazil) and Leonid Shcherbakov (Soviet Union).

In 1990, he was awarded the Olympic Order by the IOC for particularly distinguished contributions to the Olympic Movement.

His death, after 18 months of illness, was mourned nationally, and his funeral was attended by president Rafael Caldera, who called him “a great Venezuelan”.

== International competitions ==
Year	Competition	Venue	Position	Event	Notes
Representing Venezuela
1951	Bolivarian Games	Caracas, Venezuela	1st	Long jump	7.20 m
1951	Bolivarian Games	Caracas, Venezuela	1st	Triple jump	15.00 m
1952	Olympic Games	Helsinki, Finland	3rd	Triple jump	15.52 m
1954	Central American and Caribbean Games	Mexico City, Mexico	5th	Long jump	6.90 m
1954	Central American and Caribbean Games	Mexico City, Mexico	13th	Triple jump	12.97 m
1955	Pan American Games	Mexico City, Mexico	2nd	Triple jump	16.13 m
1960	Ibero-American Games	Santiago, Chile	13th (q)	Long jump	6.54 m
1960	Ibero-American Games	Santiago, Chile	7th (q)	Triple jump	14.17 m^{1}
1961	South American Championships	Lima, Peru	1st	Triple jump	14.68 m
1961	Bolivarian Games	Barranquilla, Colombia	1st	Triple jump	14.13 m
1963	South American Championships	Cali, Colombia	1st	Triple jump	15.09 m
1965	South American Championships	Rio de Janeiro, Brazil	5th	Triple jump	14.33 m

^{1}No mark in the final
