= Salim Barjum =

Colombian diver

Personal information
- Nationality: Colombian
- Born: 25 July 1952 (age 73) Cali, Colombia

Sport
- Sport: Diving
Medal record
South American Swimming Championships
Gold medal – first place	1970 Lima	3 m springboard
Gold medal – first place	1972 Arica	3 m springboard
Bolivarian Games
Gold medal – first place	1970 Maracaibo	3 m springboard
Gold medal – first place	1973 Panamá	3 m springboard

Salim Barjum Roque (born 25 July 1952) is a Colombian diver. He competed at the 1968 Summer Olympics and the 1972 Summer Olympics.
