= Filemón Camacho =

Venezuelan middle-distance runner

Personal information
- Born: 22 November 1926 Panaquire, Venezuela
- Died: 27 June 2012 (aged 85) Caracas, Venezuela

Sport
- Sport: Middle-distance running
- Events: 200 metres 400 metres 800 metres 1500 metres
Medal record
South American Championships
Bronze medal – third place	1954 São Paulo	4 x 400 metres relay
Central American and Caribbean Games
Bronze medal – third place	1954 Mexico	1500 metres
Bolivarian Games
Silver medal – second place	1951 Caracas	4 x 400 metres relay
Bronze medal – third place	1951 Caracas	800 metres
Bronze medal – third place	1951 Caracas	1500 metres

Filemón Camacho (22 November 1926 – 27 June 2012) was a Venezuelan middle-distance runner. He competed in the men's 800 metres at the 1952 Summer Olympics.

== International competitions ==
Year	Competition	Venue	Position	Event	Notes
Representing Venezuela
1951	Pan American Games	Buenos Aires, Argentina	7th (h)	1500 m	NT
1951	Bolivarian Games	Caracas, Venezuela	3rd	800 m	2:00.4
1951	Bolivarian Games	Caracas, Venezuela	3rd	1500 m	4:09.4
1951	Bolivarian Games	Caracas, Venezuela	2nd	4 × 400 m relay	3:23.1
1952	Olympic Games	Helsinki, Finland	46th (h)	800 m	2:00.0
1952	Olympic Games	Helsinki, Finland	48th (h)	1500 m	4:18.0
1954	Central American and Caribbean Games	Mexico City, Mexico	3rd	1500 m	4:17.71
1954	Central American and Caribbean Games	Mexico City, Mexico	5th	4 × 400 m relay	3:20.2
1954	South American Championships	São Paulo, Brazil	3rd	4 × 400 m relay	3:21.0
1955	Pan American Games	Mexico City, Mexico	6th	1500 m	4:08.0
1959	Central American and Caribbean Games	Caracas, Venezuela	–	1500 m	NT
1959	Central American and Caribbean Games	Caracas, Venezuela	–	5000 m	NT
