= Football at the Pan American Games =

- No. of events: 2 tournaments (men and women)

Football at the Pan American Games is an association football competition organized by Panam Sports in the continental multi-sport event of the Pan American Games. The men's tournament has been played since 1951, the women's tournament since 1999. The men's tournament has restricted the participation of elite players in various ways, while the women's tournament is for senior national teams.

The tournament was played in a league format from 1951 to 1963, neither the final nor bronze medal match was hosted. Another format was used in 1971, this time the tournament was played in a group format in the early stages, but played in a league format for the final stages. The 1983 tournament saw only 3 teams playing in the final group stages, with the first and final time the tournament did not have the fourth place team.

== Results ==
=== Men's tournament ===
Year	Host city	Gold	Results	Silver	Bronze	Results	Fourth place	Teams
Olympic teams (amateur)
1951	(Argentina) Buenos Aires	Argentina	Robin-Round	Costa Rica	Chile	Robin-Round	Venezuela	5
1955	Mexico City	Argentina	Robin-Round	Mexico	Netherlands Antilles	Robin-Round	Venezuela	4
1959	(United States) Chicago	Argentina	Robin-Round	Brazil	United States	Robin-Round	Haiti	7
1963	(Brazil) São Paulo	Brazil	Robin-Round	Argentina	Chile	Robin-Round	Uruguay	5
1967	(Canada) Winnipeg	Mexico	4–0 (a.e.t.)	Bermuda	Trinidad and Tobago	4–1	Canada	8
1971	(Colombia) Cali	Argentina	Robin-Round	Colombia	Cuba	Robin-Round	Trinidad and Tobago	12
1975	Mexico City	Mexico; Brazil (Note: Title shared, no silver medal awarded.)	1–1 (a.e.t.)	–	Argentina	2–0	Costa Rica	13
1979	(Puerto Rico) San Juan	Brazil	3–0	Cuba	Argentina	2–0	Costa Rica	12
1983	(Venezuela) Caracas	Uruguay	1–0	Brazil	Guatemala	(Note: No third match held.)		10
1987	(United States) Indianapolis	Brazil	2–0 (a.e.t.)	Chile	Argentina	0–0 (5–4 p)	Mexico	12
Olympic teams (U-22/U-23)
1991	(Cuba) Havana	United States	2–1 (a.e.t.)	Mexico	Cuba	1–0	Honduras	8
Olympic teams (amateur)
1995	(Argentina) Mar del Plata	Argentina	0–0 (5–4 p)	Mexico	Colombia	3–0	Honduras	12
Olympic teams (U-22/U-23)
1999	(Canada) Winnipeg	Mexico	3–1	Honduras	United States	2–1	Canada	10
2003	(Dominican Republic) Santo Domingo	Argentina	1–0	Brazil	Mexico	0–0 (5–4 p)	Colombia	8
U-20 teams/U-17 teams (plus 3 overage players)
2007	(Brazil) Rio de Janeiro	Ecuador	2–1	Jamaica	Mexico	1–0	Bolivia	12
Olympic teams (U-22/U-23)
2011	(Mexico) Guadalajara	Mexico	1–0	Argentina	Uruguay	2–1	Costa Rica	8
2015	(Canada) Toronto	Uruguay	1–0	Mexico	Brazil	3–1 (a.e.t.)	Panama	8
2019	(Peru) Lima	Argentina	4–1	Honduras	Mexico	1–0	Uruguay	8
2023	(Chile) Santiago	Brazil	1–1 (4–2 p)	Chile	Mexico	4–1	United States	8

=== Women's tournament ===
Year	Host city	Gold	Results	Silver	Bronze	Results	Fourth place	Teams
Senior teams
1999	(Canada) Winnipeg	United States	1–0	Mexico	Costa Rica	1–1 (4–3 p)	Canada	5
2003	(Dominican Republic) Santo Domingo	Brazil	2–1 (a.e.t.)	Canada	Mexico	4–1	Argentina	6
2007	(Brazil) Rio de Janeiro	Brazil	5–0	United States	Canada	2–1	Mexico	10
2011	(Mexico) Guadalajara	Canada	1–1 (4–3 p)	Brazil	Mexico	1–0 (a.e.t.)	Colombia	8
2015	(Canada) Toronto	Brazil	4–0	Colombia	Mexico	2–1	Canada	8
2019	(Peru) Lima	Colombia	1–1 (7–6 p)	Argentina	Costa Rica	1–0	Paraguay	8
2023	(Chile) Santiago	Mexico	1–0	Chile	United States	2–0	Argentina	8

== Performances ==
=== Men's medals ===
Team	Gold	Silver	Bronze	Total
Argentina	7 (1951, 1955, 1959, 1971, 1995, 2003, 2019)	2 (1963, 2011)	3 (1975, 1979, 1987)	12
Brazil	5 (1963, 1975*, 1979, 1987, 2023)	3 (1959, 1983, 2003)	1 (2015)	9
Mexico	4 (1967, 1975*, 1999, 2011)	4 (1955, 1991, 1995, 2015)	4 (2003, 2007, 2019, 2023)	12
Uruguay	2 (1983, 2015)	–	1 (2011)	3
United States	1 (1991)	–	2 (1959, 1999)	3
Ecuador	1 (2007)	–	–	1
Chile	–	2 (1987, 2023)	2 (1951, 1963)	4
Honduras	–	2 (1999, 2019)	–	2
Cuba	–	1 (1979)	2 (1971, 1991)	3
Colombia	–	1 (1971)	1 (1995)	2
Costa Rica	–	1 (1951)	–	1
Bermuda	–	1 (1967)	–	1
Jamaica	–	1 (2007)	–	1
Trinidad and Tobago	–	–	1 (1967)	1
Netherlands Antilles	–	–	1 (1955)	1
Guatemala	–	–	1 (1983)	1

Notes

Italic — Hosts

* shared title

=== Women's medals ===
Team	Gold	Silver	Bronze	Total
Brazil	3 (2003, 2007, 2015)	1 (2011)	–	4
Mexico	1 (2023)	1 (1999)	3 (2003, 2011, 2015)	5
United States; U-20/U-19/U-18	1 (1999)	1 (2007)	1 (2023)	3
Canada	1 (2011)	1 (2003)	1 (2007)	3
Colombia	1 (2019)	1 (2015)	–	2
Argentina	–	1 (2019)	–	1
Chile	–	1 (2023)	–	1
Costa Rica	–	–	2 (1999, 2019)	2

Notes

Italic — Hosts

== Participating teams ==
National teams participated with their Olympic teams represented by amateur players and Olympic teams represented by under-22 and under-23 players with 3 overage players. In some cases such as in 1951 (for Venezuela and Costa Rica) some countries sent their full squad (including overage players).

=== Men's tournament ===
Nation	(Argentina) 1951	(Mexico) 1955	(United States) 1959	(Brazil) 1963	(Canada) 1967	(Colombia) 1971	(Mexico) 1975	(Puerto Rico) 1979	(Venezuela) 1983	(United States) 1987	(Cuba) 1991	(Argentina) 1995	(Canada) 1999	(Dominican Republic) 2003	(Brazil) 2007	(Mexico) 2011	(Canada) 2015	(Peru) 2019	(Chile) 2023	Years
Argentina	1st place, gold medalist(s)	1st place, gold medalist(s)	1st place, gold medalist(s)	2nd place, silver medalist(s)	5	1st place, gold medalist(s)	3rd place, bronze medalist(s)	3rd place, bronze medalist(s)	9	3rd place, bronze medalist(s)		1st place, gold medalist(s)		1st place, gold medalist(s)	9	2nd place, silver medalist(s)		1st place, gold medalist(s)		15
Bahamas						9														1
Bermuda					2nd place, silver medalist(s)	10		8	8			11								5
Bolivia							6								4					2
Brazil			2nd place, silver medalist(s)	1st place, gold medalist(s)			1st place, gold medalist(s)	1st place, gold medalist(s)	2nd place, silver medalist(s)	1st place, gold medalist(s)		5		2nd place, silver medalist(s)	5	6	3rd place, bronze medalist(s)		1st place, gold medalist(s)	12
Canada					4	5	7			11	7		4				7			7
Chile	3rd place, bronze medalist(s)			3rd place, bronze medalist(s)					4	2nd place, silver medalist(s)		8							2nd place, silver medalist(s)	6
Colombia					8	2nd place, silver medalist(s)				10		3rd place, bronze medalist(s)		4	6				6	7
Costa Rica	2nd place, silver medalist(s)		5				4	4				6	6		10	4				8
Cuba			7		7	3rd place, bronze medalist(s)	5	2nd place, silver medalist(s)	7	8	3rd place, bronze medalist(s)		8	6		8				11
Dominican Republic						12		9						8					8	4
Ecuador												9			1st place, gold medalist(s)	7		8		4
El Salvador							9			7										2
Guatemala								7	3rd place, bronze medalist(s)	5			7	7						5
Haiti			4			8					5				11					4
Honduras											4	4	2nd place, silver medalist(s)		7			2nd place, silver medalist(s)	7	6
Jamaica						11	12						5		2nd place, silver medalist(s)			6		5
Mexico		2nd place, silver medalist(s)	6		1st place, gold medalist(s)	7	1st place, gold medalist(s)		5	4	2nd place, silver medalist(s)	2nd place, silver medalist(s)	1st place, gold medalist(s)	3rd place, bronze medalist(s)	3rd place, bronze medalist(s)	1st place, gold medalist(s)	2nd place, silver medalist(s)	3rd place, bronze medalist(s)	3rd place, bronze medalist(s)	16
Netherlands Antilles		3rd place, bronze medalist(s)																		1
Nicaragua							13				8									2
Panama																	4	5		2
Paraguay	5									9		7		5			5			5
Peru																	6	7		2
Puerto Rico								5												1
Suriname											6									1
Trinidad and Tobago					3rd place, bronze medalist(s)	4	8			12		10	9			5	8			8
United States			3rd place, bronze medalist(s)	5	6	6	11	6	10	6	1st place, gold medalist(s)	12	3rd place, bronze medalist(s)		8				4	13
Uruguay				4			10		1st place, gold medalist(s)				10			3rd place, bronze medalist(s)	1st place, gold medalist(s)	4	5	8
Venezuela	4	4							6						12					4
Nations	5	4	7	5	8	12	13	9	10	12	8	12	10	8	12	8	8	8	8	

=== Women's tournament ===
Nation	(Canada) 1999	(Dominican Republic) 2003	(Brazil) 2007	(Mexico) 2011	(Canada) 2015	(Peru) 2019	(Chile) 2023	Years
Argentina		4	5	7	8	2nd place, silver medalist(s)	4	6
Bolivia							7	1
Brazil		1st place, gold medalist(s)	1st place, gold medalist(s)	2nd place, silver medalist(s)	1st place, gold medalist(s)			4
Canada	4	2nd place, silver medalist(s)	3rd place, bronze medalist(s)	1st place, gold medalist(s)	4			5
Chile				5			2nd place, silver medalist(s)	2
Colombia				4	2nd place, silver medalist(s)	1st place, gold medalist(s)		3
Costa Rica	3rd place, bronze medalist(s)	5		6	5	3rd place, bronze medalist(s)	6	6
Ecuador			7		6			2
Haiti		6						1
Jamaica			6			7	8	3
Mexico	2nd place, silver medalist(s)	3rd place, bronze medalist(s)	4	3rd place, bronze medalist(s)	3rd place, bronze medalist(s)	5	1st place, gold medalist(s)	7
Panama			8			6		2
Paraguay			10			4	5	3
Peru						8		1
Trinidad and Tobago	5			8	7			3
United States; U-20/U-19/U-18	1st place, gold medalist(s)		2nd place, silver medalist(s)				3rd place, bronze medalist(s)	3
Uruguay			9					1
Nations	5	6	10	8	8	8	8	

== Overall medals table ==
Rank	Nation	Gold	Silver	Bronze	Total
1	Brazil	8	4	1	13
2	Argentina	7	3	3	13
3	Mexico	5	5	7	17
4	United States	2	1	3	6
5	Uruguay	2	0	1	3
6	Colombia	1	2	1	4
7	Canada	1	1	1	3
8	Ecuador	1	0	0	1
9	Chile	0	3	2	5
10	Honduras	0	2	0	2
11	Costa Rica	0	1	2	3
11	Cuba	0	1	2	3
13	Bermuda	0	1	0	1
13	Jamaica	0	1	0	1
15	Guatemala	0	0	1	1
15	Netherlands Antilles	0	0	1	1
15	Trinidad and Tobago	0	0	1	1
Totals (17 entries)		27	25	26	78

== See also ==
- Futsal at the Pan American Games
- Football at the Central American and Caribbean Games
- Football at the Central American Games
- Football at the South American Games
- Football at the Bolivarian Games
