= 1985 Bolivarian Games =

X Bolivarian Games
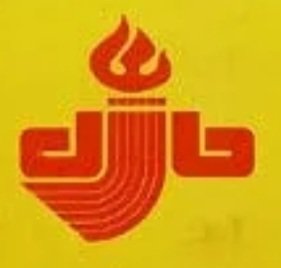
- Host city: Cuenca, Azuay; Ambato, Tungurahua; Portoviejo, Manabí
- Country: Ecuador
- Nations: 6
- Events: 20 sports
- Opening: November 9, 1985
- Closing: November 18, 1985
- Opened by: León Febres Cordero
- Torch lighter: Jhon Jarrín; Arturo Cárdenas
- Main venue: Estadio Alejandro Serrano Aguilar

The X Bolivarian Games (Spanish: Juegos Bolivarianos) were a multi-sport event held between November 9–18, 1985, in Cuenca, Ambato, and Portoviejo, Ecuador. The Games were organized by the Bolivarian Sports Organization (ODEBO).

The opening ceremony took place on November 9, 1985, at the Estadio Alejandro Serrano Aguilar in Cuenca. The Games were officially opened by Ecuadorean president León Febres Cordero. Torch lighter were cyclist Jhon Jarrín and football player Arturo Cárdenas, gold medalist at the 1965 Bolivarian Games.

A detailed history of the early editions of the Bolivarian Games between 1938 and 1989 was published in a book written (in Spanish) by José Gamarra Zorrilla, former president of the Bolivian Olympic Committee, and first president (1976-1982) of ODESUR. Gold medal winners from Ecuador were published by the Comité Olímpico Ecuatoriano.

== Participation ==
Athletes from 6 countries were reported to participate:

- Bolivia
- Colombia
- Ecuador
- Panama
- Peru
- Venezuela

== Sports ==
The following 20 sports were explicitly mentioned:

- Aquatic sports
  - Diving
  - Swimming
- Athletics
- Baseball
- Basketball
- Bowling
- Boxing
- Chess
- Cycling
  - Road cycling
  - Track cycling
- Equestrian
- Football
- Gymnastics (artistic)
- Judo
- Sailing
- Shooting
- Table tennis
- Taekwondo
- Tennis
- Volleyball
- Weightlifting
- Wrestling

== Medal count ==
The medal count for these Games is tabulated below. This table is sorted by the number of gold medals earned by each country. The number of silver medals is taken into consideration next, and then the number of bronze medals.

1985 Bolivarian Games Medal Count
| Rank | Nation | Gold | Silver | Bronze | Total |
| 1 | Venezuela | 105 | 86 | 45 | 236 |
| 2 | Colombia | 59 | 62 | 64 | 185 |
| 3 | Peru | 27 | 23 | 56 | 106 |
| 4 | Ecuador | 26 | 43 | 57 | 126 |
| 5 | Panama | 12 | 15 | 22 | 49 |
| 6 | Bolivia | 1 | 2 | 10 | 13 |
| Total | | 230 | 231 | 254 | 715 |
