= Jhon Jarrín =

Ecuadorian cyclist (1961–2021)

Personal information
- Born: 21 December 1961 Guamote, Ecuador
- Died: 9 March 2021 (aged 59) Cuenca, Ecuador

Cycling career
- Sport: Cycling

Jhon Jarrín (21 December 1961 – 9 March 2021) was an Ecuadorian track cyclist.

He was seen as a Colombian track cycling pioneer. After he became an established track cyclist, he competed in the individual and team pursuit events at the 1980 Summer Olympics.

He became the South American, Bolivarian Games and Pan American champion. He continued with track cycling in the masters category. He was together with footballer Arturo Cárdenas the torch lighter at the 1985 Bolivarian Games.

Jarrín was hit by a motorist in Cuenca on 9 March 2021 and died from the injuries shortly after.
