= Athletics at the 1938 Bolivarian Games =

Athletics at the I Bolivarian Games
- Dates: August 6–22
- Host city: Bogotá, Colombia
- Venue: Estadio El Campín
- Level: Senior
- Events: 27 (23 men, 4 women)

Athletics competitions at the 1938 Bolivarian Games were held at the Estadio El Campín in Bogotá, Colombia, in August 1938.

A detailed history of the early editions of the Bolivarian Games between 1938 and 1989 was published in a book written (in Spanish) by José Gamarra Zorrilla, former president of the Bolivian Olympic Committee, and first president (1976–1982) of ODESUR. Gold medal winners from Ecuador were published by the Comité Olímpico Ecuatoriano.

A total of 27 events were contested, 23 by men and 4 by women. Unusually, cross country events (individual and team) were part of the games.

== Medal summary ==
Medal winners were published.

=== Men ===
Event	Gold		Silver		Bronze	
100 metres	Manuel Valega (PER)	11.0 A	Luis Derteano (PER)	11.1 A	Roberto Temple (PER)	11.3 A
200 metres	Manuel Valega (PER)	23.2 A	José Sánchez (COL)		Luis Derteano (PER)	
400 metres	Antonio Cuba (PER)	51.2 A	Luis Luna (PER)	51.6 A	Carlos Uribe (COL)	52.1 A
800 metres	Luis Espinoza (PER)	2:02.0 A	Luis Gómez (COL)	2:03.2 A	José Carrizales (PER)	
1500 metres	Manuel Alandia (BOL)	4:29.4 A	José Carrizales (PER)	4:29.8 A	Evaristo Torres (ECU)	
5000 metres	Héctor Toscano (ECU)	16:50.0 A	Luis Calderón (ECU)	16:51.0 A	Manuel Alandia (BOL)	
10000 metres	Luis Calderón (ECU)	36:55.8 A	Domingo Ticona (PER)	37:33.0 A	José Cadena (ECU)	
Half Marathon	Jorge Nova (COL)	1:34:18 A	Segundo Cadena (ECU)	1:35:00 A	Miguel Orihuela (BOL)	
110 metres hurdles	Tulio Pescheira (PER)	16.1 A	Marcelo Julca (PER)	16.2 A	Luis de la Guerra (PER)	16.4 A
400 metres hurdles	Marcelo Julca (PER)	56.9 A	Enrique Valdivia (PER)	58.7 A	Raúl Pardón (PER)	
High jump	José Castro (PER)	1.80 A	Julio Mera (PER)	1.80 A	Eduardo Murata (PER)	1.70 A
Pole vault	Modesto Santa María (PER)	3.50 A	Guillermo Chirichigno (PER)	3.50 A	Eduardo Murata (PER)	3.40 A
Long jump	Guillermo Dyer (PER)	7.23 A	Carlos Iturri (PER)	6.74 A	Julio Mera (PER)	6.64 A
Triple jump	Oscar Bringas (PER)	15.40 A	Humberto Perea (COL)	14.20 A	Julio Mera (PER)	13.93 A
Shot put	Manuel Consiglieri (PER)	12.90 A	Tulio Pescheira (PER)	12.61 A	Abraham Woll (PER)	11.36 A
Discus throw	Manuel Consiglieri (PER)	42.01 A	Atilio Accinelli (PER)	38.76 A	Campo Gutiérrez (COL)	35.60 A
Hammer throw	Manuel Consiglieri (PER)	40.20 A	Atilio Accinelli (PER)	39.66 A	Fernando Saco (PER)	35.35 A
Javelin throw	Tulio Pescheira (PER)	52.40 A	Manuel Falkonert (COL)	52.15 A	Vicente Acevedo (PER)	48.31 A
Pentathlon	Vicente Acevedo (PER)	2775 A	Abraham Woll (PER)	2546 A	Elias Gutiérrez (COL)	2164 A
4 x 100 metres relay	Peru	43.3 A	Ecuador	44.5 A	Colombia	
4 x 400 metres relay	Peru	3:28.9 A	Colombia	3:31.6 A	Ecuador	3:51.4 A
Cross Country - Individual	Domingo Ticona (PER)	42:32 A	Silverio Pérez (PER)		Luis Carrillo (COL)	
Cross Country - Team	Peru					

=== Women ===
Event	Gold		Silver		Bronze
50 metres	Carola Castro (ECU)	7.1 A	Cecilia Navarrete (COL)		Raquel Gómez (COL)
100 metres	Cecilia Navarrete (COL)	15.3 A	Adela Jiménez (COL)		Carola Castro (ECU)
Discus throw	Cecilia Navarrete (COL)	23.24 A	Elvira Balbuena (COL)	21.29 A	
4 x 100 metres relay	Colombia	54.9 A	Ecuador		

== Medal table (unofficial) ==
* Host nation (Colombia)

Rank	Nation	Gold	Silver	Bronze	Total
1	Peru (PER)	19	14	12	45
2	Colombia (COL)*	4	8	6	18
3	Ecuador (ECU)	3	4	4	11
4	Bolivia (BOL)	1	0	2	3
Totals (4 entries)		27	26	24	77
