= Pablo Freund =

Pablo Freund was a Czechoslovak-born Ecuadorian businessman, agricultural technician and athlete who specialised in the throwing events and won two bronze medals at the 1951 Bolivarian Games.

== Biography ==
According to the sociologist Manuel Grubel Rosenthal, Freund belonged to the Jewish community established in Ecuador, having emigrated from central Europe before settling in the country and taking Ecuadorian nationality.

== Sporting career ==
At the third Bolivarian Games, held in Caracas in December 1951, Freund won two bronze medals representing Ecuador: in the shot put, with a mark of 12.24 m, and in the discus throw, with 40.21 m.

== International competitions ==
Year	Competition	Venue	Position	Event	Notes
Representing Ecuador
1951	Bolivarian Games	Caracas, Venezuela	3rd	Shot put	12.24 m
1951	Bolivarian Games	Caracas, Venezuela	3rd	Discus throw	40.21 m
1953	South American Championships (unofficial)	Santiago, Chile	9th	Discus throw	Unknown
