= 1965 Bolivarian Games =

V Bolivarian Games
- Host city: Quito; Guayaquil
- Country: Ecuador
- Nations: 6
- Athletes: about 1200
- Events: 20 sports + 1 exhibition
- Opening: November 20, 1965
- Closing: December 5, 1965
- Opened by: Ramón Castro Jijón (Quito); Jaime García Naranjo (Guayaquil)
- Athlete's Oath: Carola Castro Jijón (Quito); Juvenal Sáenz Gil (Guayaquil)
- Torch lighter: Luís Calderón Gallardo (Quito); Edgar Andrade (Guayaquil)
- Main venue: Estadio Olímpico Atahualpa (Quito); Estadio Modelo Guayaquil (Guayaquil)

The V Bolivarian Games (Spanish: Juegos Bolivarianos) were a multi-sport event held between November 20 - December 5, 1965, in Quito and Guayaquil, Ecuador. The Games were organized by the Bolivarian Sports Organization (ODEBO).

Separate inauguration ceremonies for the Games were held in both venues. In Quito, the Games were officially opened by Ecuadorian president and chairman of the military junta Ramón Castro Jijón. Torch lighter was former long distance runner, 10,000 metres gold medal winner at the I Bolivarian Games Luís Calderón. The athlete's oath was sworn by the president's sister, former sprinter and 50 metres gold medal winner at the I Bolivarian Games Carola Castro. In Guayaquil, the Games were officially opened by the president of the organizing committee, Jaime García Naranjo. Torch lighter was Edgar Andrade. The athlete's oath was sworn by baseball player Juvenal Sáenz.

A detailed history of the early editions of the Bolivarian Games between 1938 and 1989 was published in a book written (in Spanish) by José Gamarra Zorrilla, former president of the Bolivian Olympic Committee, and first president (1976-1982) of ODESUR. Gold medal winners from Ecuador were published by the Comité Olímpico Ecuatoriano.

== Venues ==
=== In Quito ===
Athletics:	Estadio Universitario
Basketball (women):	Coliseo Cerrado
Boxing:	Coliseo Cerrado
Chess:	Quito Tenis y Golf Club
Equestrian:	Grupo Yaguachi; Jardín de Saltos del Colegio Militar Eloy Alfaro; Estadio Olímpico Atahualpa
Fencing:	Colegio Militar Eloy Alfaro
Football:	Estadio Olímpico Atahualpa
Golf:	Quito Tenis y Golf Club
Gymnastics:	Coliseo Cerrado
Volleyball:	Coliseo Cerrado

=== In Guayaquil ===
Baseball:	Estadio Yeyo Uraga
Basketball (men):	Coliseo Cerrado de Guayaquil
Cycling (road):
Cycling (track):	Velódromo Modelo
Judo:	Coliseo Cerrado de Guayaquil
Sailing:	Salinas Yacht Club
Shooting:	Polígono Vicente Pin
Swimming/Diving:	Piscina Olímpica Asisclo Garay
Table tennis:	Coliseo Cerrado de Guayaquil
Tennis:	Estadio Francisco Segura
Weightlifting:	Gimnasio Guayaquil
Wrestling:	Coliseo Huancavilca

== Participation ==
About 1200 athletes from 6 countries were reported to participate:

- Bolivia
- Colombia
- Ecuador
- Panama
- Peru
- Venezuela

== Sports ==
The following sports were explicitly mentioned:

- Aquatic sports
  - Diving
  - Swimming
- Athletics
- Baseball
- Basketball
- Boxing
- Chess
- Cycling
  - Road cycling
  - Track cycling
- Equestrian
- Fencing
- Football
- Golf
- Gymnastics (artistic)
- Judo
- Pelota Nacional^{†}
- Sailing
- Shooting
- Table tennis
- Tennis
- Volleyball
- Weightlifting
- Wrestling

^{†}: Exhibition event.

== Medal count ==
The medal count for these Games is tabulated below. This table is sorted by the number of gold medals earned by each country. The number of silver medals is taken into consideration next, and then the number of bronze medals.

1965 Bolivarian Games Medal Count
Rank	Nation	Gold	Silver	Bronze	Total
1	Venezuela	62	52	39	153
2	Colombia	30	17	22	69
3	Peru	23	33	24	80
4	Ecuador	18	24	40	82
5	Panama	7	11	7	25
6	Bolivia	4	3	1	8
Total		144	140	133	417
