= Athletics at the 1951 Bolivarian Games =

Athletics at the III Bolivarian Games
- Dates: December 5-21
- Host city: Caracas, Venezuela
- Venue: Estadio Olímpico de la Universidad Central de Venezuela
- Level: Senior
- Events: 28 (21 men, 7 women)

Athletics competitions at the 1951 Bolivarian Games were held at the Estadio Olímpico de la Universidad Central de Venezuela in Caracas, Venezuela, between 5-21 December 1951.

A detailed history of the early editions of the Bolivarian Games between 1938 and 1989 was published in a book written (in Spanish) by José Gamarra Zorrilla, former president of the Bolivian Olympic Committee, and first president (1976-1982) of ODESUR. Gold medal winners from Ecuador were published by the Comité Olímpico Ecuatoriano.

A total of 28 events were contested, 21 by men and 7 by women.

== Medal summary ==
Medal winners were published.

=== Men ===
| Event | Gold | | Silver | | Bronze | |
|---|---|---|---|---|---|---|
| 100 metres | Gerardo Salazar (PER) | 10.9 | Andrés Fernández (ECU) | 11.0 | Clayton Clark (PAN) | 11.0 |
| 200 metres | Gerardo Salazar (PER) | 22.1 | Jaime Aparicio (COL) | 22.2 | Clayton Clark (PAN) | 22.4 |
| 400 metres | Sam LaBeach (PAN) | 48.0 | Guillermo Gutiérrez (VEN) | 48.4 | Miguel Ardín (VEN) | 50.8 |
| 800 metres | Frank Prince (PAN) | 1:58.0 | Libardo Mora (COL) | 1:59.6 | Filemón Camacho (VEN) | 2:00.4 |
| 1500 metres | Frank Prince (PAN) | 4:05.2 | Libardo Mora (COL) | 4:05.8 | Filemón Camacho (VEN) | 4:09.4 |
| 5000 metres | Faustino López (PAN) | 16:17.1 | Wenceslao Barzola (PER) | 16:17.3 | Germán Lozano (COL) | 16:18.8 |
| 10,000 metres | Wenceslao Barzola (PER) | 33:49.3 | Espiridión Villarcel (BOL) | 34:01.4 | Gustavo Ramírez (COL) | 34:18.8 |
| Half Marathon | Gustavo Ramírez (COL) | 1:13:17 | Germán Lozano (COL) | 1:13:50 | Espiridión Villarcel (BOL) | 1:14:19 |
| 110 metres hurdles | Teófilo Davis Bell (VEN) | 14.9 | Hernán Alzamora (PER) | 15.5 | Carlos Avíla (COL) | 15.5 |
| 400 metres hurdles | Jaime Aparicio (COL) | 55.4 | Eduardo Leyva (COL) | 56.7 | Juan Laca (PER) | 56.9 |
| 4 x 100 metres relay | Peru; Armando Zapata; Máximo Reyes; Miguel León Pizzarro; Gerardo Salazar | 42.0 | Panama; Marcos Wilson; Cirilo McSween; Sam LaBeach; Clayton Clarke | 42.2 | Colombia; Jaime Aparicio; Libardo Mora; Leonardo Cañas; Aristipo Lerma | 43.0 |
| 4 x 400 metres relay | Panama; Marcos Wilson; Clayton Clarke; Frank Prince; Sam LaBeach | 3:16.5 | Venezuela; Juan Leiva; Filemón Camacho; Miguel Ardín; Guillermo Gutiérrez | 3:23.1 | Colombia; Aristipo Lerma; Euclides Melo; Libardo Mora; Jaime Aparicio | 3:24.8 |
| High jump | Teófilo Davis Bell (VEN) | 1.81 | Cecil Dolmage (PER) | 1.77 | | |
| Pole vault | Jaime Piqueras (PER) | 3.75 | Luis Ganoza (PER) | 3.75 | Pionono Chirino (VEN) | 3.65 |
| Long jump | Asnoldo Devonish (VEN) | 7.20 | Máximo Reyes (PER) | 6.93 | Alfaro Parra (COL) | 6.79 |
| Triple jump | Asnoldo Devonish (VEN) | 15.00 | Alberto Betalleluz (PER) | 14.53 | Jorge Mendoza (PER) | 13.77 |
| Shot put | Rafael Trompiz (VEN) | 13.38 | Mauricio Rodríguez (VEN) | 12.35 | Pablo Freund (ECU) | 12.24 |
| Discus throw | Mauricio Rodríguez (VEN) | 41.85 | Manuel Consiglieri (PER) | 40.41 | Pablo Freund (ECU) | 40.21 |
| Hammer throw | Alberto Peirano (PER) | 43.71 | Vicente Lagoyete (COL) | 42.14 | Manuel Consiglieri (PER) | 41.47 |
| Javelin throw | Carlos Monge (PER) | 54.49 | Hans Hillman (PER) | 52.77 | Manuel Gómez (VEN) | 51.60 |
| Pentathlon | Brígido Iriarte (VEN) | 3115 | Hernán Alzamora (PER) | 2742 | Manuel Gómez (VEN) | 2631 |

=== Women ===
| Event | Gold | | Silver | | Bronze | |
|---|---|---|---|---|---|---|
| 50 metres | Carlota Gooden (PAN) | 6.5 | Adelina Bernard (PAN) | 6.8 | Raquel Torres (PER) | 6.8 |
| 100 metres | Carlota Gooden (PAN) | 12.5 | Adelina Bernard (PAN) | 12.7 | Raquel Torres (PER) | 12.7 |
| 80 metres hurdles | Aída Mawyin (ECU) | 13.3 | Brígida Gonzales (PER) | 13.6 | Manuela Vértiz (PER) | 13.6 |
| 4 x 100 metres relay | Panama; Esther Stewart; Dolores Worrell; Adelina Bernard; Carlota Gooden | 49.5 | Peru; Isidora Aparicio; Julia Reyna; Brigida Gonzales; Raquel Torres | 51.3 | Venezuela; Julia Condore; Dora Rivero; María Luiza Hernández; Josefina Romero | 52.9 |
| High jump | Jacinta Sandiford (ECU) | 1.47 | Sheila Leyva (VEN) | 1.41 | Raquel Ruiz (PER) | 1.38 |
| Discus throw | Julia Huapaya (PER) | 35.10 | Carmen Córcega (VEN) | 33.46 | Petra Carrera (VEN) | 30.17 |
| Javelin throw | Sheila Leyva (VEN) | 36.22 | Clorinda Herrera (PER) | 34.55 | Josefina Rivero (VEN) | 33.35 |

== Medal table (unofficial) ==
* Host nation (Venezuela)

| Rank | Nation | Gold | Silver | Bronze | Total |
|---|---|---|---|---|---|
| 1 | Peru (PER) | 8 | 12 | 7 | 27 |
| 2 | Venezuela (VEN)* | 8 | 5 | 9 | 22 |
| 3 | Panama (PAN) | 8 | 3 | 2 | 13 |
| 4 | Colombia (COL) | 2 | 6 | 6 | 14 |
| 5 | Ecuador (ECU) | 2 | 1 | 2 | 5 |
| 6 | Bolivia (BOL) | 0 | 1 | 1 | 2 |
| Totals (6 entries) | | 28 | 28 | 27 | 83 |
