= 1970 Bolivarian Games =

VI Bolivarian Games
- Host city: Maracaibo
- Country: Venezuela
- Nations: 6
- Athletes: 1122
- Events: 17 sports
- Opening: August 22, 1970
- Closing: September 6, 1970
- Opened by: Rafael Caldera
- Athlete's Oath: Brígido Iriarte
- Torch lighter: José "Pachencho" Romero
- Main venue: Estadio Olímpico del Complejo Polideportivo

The VI Bolivarian Games (Spanish: Juegos Bolivarianos) were a multi-sport event held between August 22 - September 6, 1970, at the Estadio Olímpico del Complejo Polideportivo in Maracaibo, Venezuela. The Games were organized by the Bolivarian Sports Organization (ODEBO).

The Games were officially opened by Venezuelan president Rafael Caldera. Torch lighter was javelin thrower José "Pachencho" Romero, who won the first gold medal ever in athletics for Venezuela at the 1947–48 Bolivarian Games. The olympic stadium in Maracaibo was later named after him. The athlete's oath was sworn by athlete Brígido Iriarte, who the gold medal in pentathlon at the 1951 Bolivarian Games.

A detailed history of the early editions of the Bolivarian Games between 1938 and 1989 was published in a book written (in Spanish) by José Gamarra Zorrilla, former president of the Bolivian Olympic Committee, and first president (1976-1982) of ODESUR. Gold medal winners from Ecuador were published by the Comité Olímpico Ecuatoriano.

== Participation ==
About 1122 Athletes from 6 countries were reported to participate:

- Bolivia
- Colombia
- Ecuador
- Panama
- Peru
- Venezuela

== Sports ==
The following 17 sports were explicitly mentioned: For the first time, softball was included. On the other hand, initially scheduled events in sailing, chess, and table tennis were cancelled.

- Aquatic sports
  - Diving
  - Swimming
- Athletics
- Baseball
- Basketball
- Boxing
- Cycling
  - Road cycling
  - Track cycling
- Equestrian
- Fencing
- Football
- Gymnastics (artistic)
- Judo
- Softball
- Shooting
- Tennis
- Volleyball
- Weightlifting
- Wrestling

== Medal count ==
The medal count for these Games is tabulated below. A slightly different number of medals (without Bolivia) was published elsewhere. This table is sorted by the number of gold medals earned by each country. The number of silver medals is taken into consideration next, and then the number of bronze medals.

1970 Bolivarian Games Medal Count
Rank	Nation	Gold	Silver	Bronze	Total
1	Venezuela	76	57	58	191
2	Colombia	52	54	45	151
3	Peru	34	40	22	96
4	Panama	18	24	29	71
5	Ecuador	8	11	15	34
6	Bolivia	1	3	5	9
Total		189	189	174	552
