= 2012 Bolivarian Beach Games =

I Boilivarian Beach Games
- Logo of the I Bolivarian Beach Games Official logo of the Lima 2012 Bolivarian Beach Games.
- Host city: Lima
- Nations participating: 10
- Athletes participating: 1500
- Events: 15
- Opening ceremony: November 1
- Closing ceremony: November 11
- Officially opened by: Patricia Salas
- Athlete's Oath: Cristóbal de Col
- Bolivarian Torch: Sofía Mulánovich
- Stadium: Manuel Bonilla

The 2012 Bolivarian Beach Games, officially the I Bolivarian Beach Games, is an international multi-sport event that is being held from November 1–11, 2012 in Lima, Peru. With approximately 1,500 athletes from 10 nations participating in 15 sports. The Bolivarian Beach are organized by the ODEBO, the Bolivarian Sports Organization.

The 2012 Bolivarian Beach Games saw the participation of Chile for the first time as a Bolivarian team, Chile had joined ODEBO not long before the games. The event also was the first time ODEBO invited not-bolivarian countries to join the 7 registered countries.

== The Games ==
=== Opening ceremony ===
The opening ceremony of the games took place on November 1, 2012, at 8:00 pm Peruvian Standard Time (-05:00 UTC) at Manuel Bonilla Stadium.

=== Participating teams ===
All 6 members of ODEBO competed at the Games plus the 4 invited members from PASO for a total of 10 countries.

ODEBO Members

- Bolivia
- Chile
- Colombia
- Ecuador
- Peru (Host)
- Venezuela

Invited nations

- Dominican Republic
- El Salvador
- Guatemala
- Paraguay

=== Sports ===
- Beach handball (2)
- Beach rugby (2)
- Beach soccer (1)
- Beach tennis (5)
- Beach volleyball (2)
- Canoeing (6)
- Open water swimming (4)
- Rowing (8)
- Sailing (8)
- Subaquatic
  - Freediving (2)
  - Open water swimming with swimfins (2) (details)
  - Spearfishing (1)
- Surfing (8)
- Triathlon (3)
- Waterskiing (10)

=== Calendar ===
OC	Opening ceremony	●	Event competitions	1	Event finals	EG	Exhibition gala	CC	Closing ceremony

November	1st Thu	2nd Fri	3rd Sat	4th Sun	5th Mon	6th Tue	7th Wed	8th Thu	9th Fri	10th Sat	11th Sun	Events
Ceremonies	OC										CC	
Beach handball		●	●	2								2
Beach rugby							●	2				2
Beach soccer					●	●	●		●	1		1
Beach tennis			●	●	5							5
Beach volleyball									●	●	2	2
Canoeing				●	3	3						6
Open water swimming	2		2									4
Rowing									●	4	4	8
Sailing						●	3	●	1	4		8
Freediving								2	2	●	1	5
Surf			●	1	1	6						8
Triathlon				3								3
Waterskiing	●	●	6	4								10
Total Events	2	0	8	10	9	9	3	4	3	9	7	64
Cumulative Total	2	2	10	20	29	38	41	45	48	57	64	
November	1st Thu	2nd Fri	3rd Sat	4th Sun	5th Mon	6th Tue	7th Wed	8th Thu	9th Fri	10th Sat	11th Sun	Events

== Medal table ==
Final medal tally

^{1}	Host nation

* Host nation (Peru)

Rank	Nation	Gold	Silver	Bronze	Total
1	Peru (PER)*	21	12	13	46
2	Venezuela (VEN)	19	11	10	40
3	Chile (CHI)	11	16	12	39
4	Ecuador (ECU)	6	13	8	27
5	Colombia (COL)	2	6	6	14
6	Paraguay (PAR)	2	2	5	9
7	Guatemala (GUA)	2	1	4	7
8	El Salvador (ESA)	1	3	3	7
9	Dominican Republic (DOM)	0	0	3	3
10	Bolivia (BOL)	0	0	0	0
Totals (10 entries)		64	64	64	192

Medal table reflecting the final results as of November 11, 2012.
