= 1938 Bolivarian Games =

I Bolivarian Games
- Host city: Bogotá
- Country: Colombia
- Nations: 6
- Athletes: 716
- Opening: August 6, 1938
- Closing: August 22, 1938
- Opened by: Alfonso López Pumarejo
- Main venue: Estadio El Campín

The I Bolivarian Games (Spanish: Juegos Bolivarianos) were a multi-sport event held between August 6–22, 1938, in Bogotá, Colombia, at the Estadio El Campín, for the city's 400th anniversary. The Games were organized by the Bolivarian Sports Organization (ODEBO).

The Games were officially opened by Colombian president Alfonso López Pumarejo, accompanied by Alberto Nariño Cheyne from the Colombian Olympic Committee, Colonel Leopoldo Piedrahita from the local organizing committee, and Gustavo Santos, mayor of the city of Bogotá.

A detailed history of the early editions of the Bolivarian Games between 1938 and 1989 was published in a book written (in Spanish) by José Gamarra Zorrilla, former president of the Bolivian Olympic Committee, and first president (1976-1982) of ODESUR. Gold medal winners from Ecuador were published by the Comité Olímpico Ecuatoriano.

The official posters for the Games were designed by Colombian artist Sergio Trujillo Magnenat.

== Historical photos ==
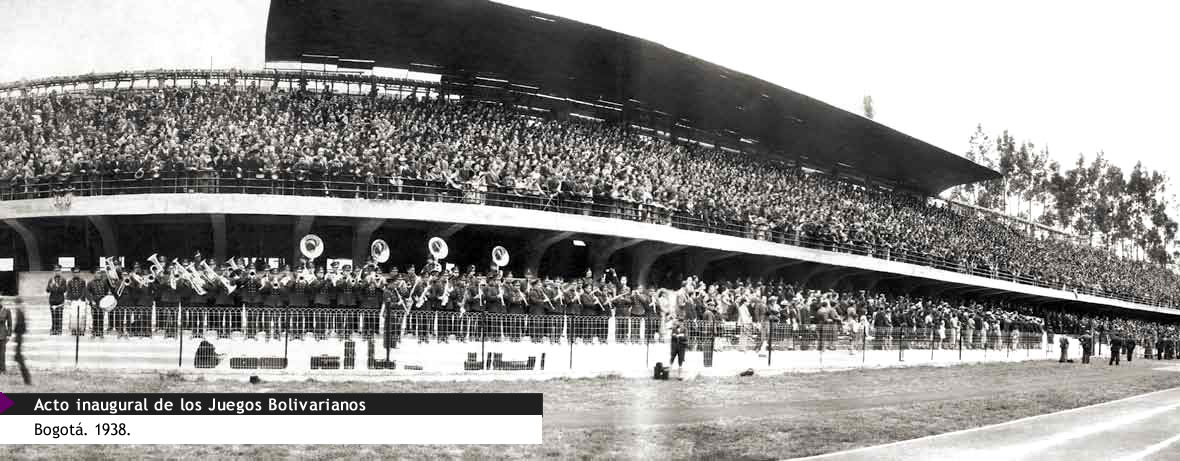
Historical photo of the inauguration act of the 1938 Bolivarian Games in Bogotá, Colombia (published by Universidad EAFIT).

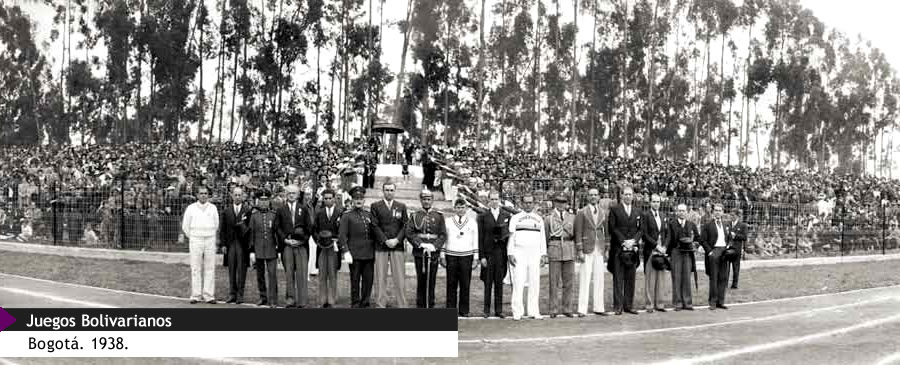
Historical photo from the 1938 Bolivarian Games in Bogotá, Colombia (published by Universidad EAFIT).

Further photos can be found on the webpage of the Luis Ángel Arango Library.

== Participation ==
A total of 716 athletes from 6 countries were reported to participate:

- Bolivia (70)
- Colombia (250)
- Ecuador (110)
- Panama (74)
- Peru (112)
- Venezuela (100)

== Sports ==
The following sports were mentioned:

- Aquatic sports
  - Diving
  - Swimming
  - Water polo
- Athletics
- Baseball
- Basketball
- Boxing
- Chess
- Cycling
- Equestrianism
- Fencing
- Football
- Golf
- Pelota al Guante^{†}
- Shooting
- Tennis
- Volleyball
- Weightlifting
- Wrestling

^{†}: Exhibition event.

The list might be incomplete.

== Medal count ==
The medal count for these Games is tabulated below. This table is sorted by the number of gold medals earned by each country. The number of silver medals is taken into consideration next, and then the number of bronze medals.

1938 Bolivarian Games Medal Count
| Rank | Nation | Gold | Silver | Bronze | Total |
| 1 | Peru | 26 | 22 | 17 | 65 |
| 2 | Ecuador | 23 | 20 | 15 | 58 |
| 3 | Colombia | 19 | 26 | 21 | 66 |
| 4 | Venezuela | 10 | 7 | 4 | 21 |
| 5 | Panama | 3 | 7 | 3 | 13 |
| 6 | Bolivia | 3 | 1 | 6 | 10 |
| Total | | 84 | 83 | 66 | 233 |
