= 1973 Bolivarian Games =

VII Bolivarian Games
- Host city: Panama City
- Country: Panama
- Nations: 5
- Athletes: 1200
- Events: 16 sports
- Opening: February 17, 1973
- Closing: March 3, 1973
- Opened by: Demetrio Basilio Lakas
- Athlete's Oath: Xenia Moreno
- Torch lighter: Faustino López
- Main venue: Estadio Revolución

The VII Bolivarian Games (Spanish: Juegos Bolivarianos) were a multi-sport event held between February 17 - March 3, 1973, at the Estadio Revolución in Panama City, Panama. The Games were organized by the Bolivarian Sports Organization (ODEBO). Ecuador was the only eligible country not to send a delegation because of "internal problems".

The Games were officially opened by Panamanian president Demetrio Basilio Lakas. Torch lighter was long-distance runner Faustino López, who won the gold medal in the 5000 metres event at the 1951 Bolivarian Games. The athlete's oath was sworn by gymnast Xenia Moreno.

A detailed history of the early editions of the Bolivarian Games between 1938 and 1989 was published in a book written (in Spanish) by José Gamarra Zorrilla, former president of the Bolivian Olympic Committee, and first president (1976–1982) of ODESUR.

== Participation ==
About 1200 Athletes from 5 countries were reported to participate:

- Bolivia
- Colombia
- Panama
- Peru
- Venezuela

== Sports ==
The following 16 sports were explicitly mentioned:

- Aquatic sports
  - Diving
  - Swimming
  - Water polo
- Athletics
- Baseball
- Basketball
- Bowling
- Boxing
- Cycling
  - Road cycling
  - Track cycling
- Fencing
- Football
- Gymnastics (artistic)
- Judo
- Shooting
- Softball
- Volleyball
- Weightlifting
- Wrestling

== Medal count ==
The medal count for these Games is tabulated below. A slightly different number of medals was published elsewhere. This table is sorted by the number of gold medals earned by each country. The number of silver medals is taken into consideration next, and then the number of bronze medals.

1973 Bolivarian Games Medal Count
Rank	Nation	Gold	Silver	Bronze	Total
1	Venezuela	60	63	57	180
2	Colombia	55	44	42	141
3	Panama	37	30	45	112
4	Peru	21	35	32	88
5	Bolivia	0	4	5	9
Total		173	176	181	530
