= 1997 Bolivarian Games =

XIII Bolivarian Games
- Host city: Arequipa, Arequipa
- Country: Peru
- Nations: 6
- Athletes: 1710
- Events: 22 sports
- Opening: October 17, 1997
- Closing: October 24, 1997
- Opened by: Alberto Fujimori
- Torch lighter: Hernán Llerena
- Main venue: Estadio Monumental de la Universidad Nacional San Agustín

The XIII Bolivarian Games (Spanish: Juegos Bolivarianos) were a multi-sport event held between October 17–26, 1997, in Arequipa, Peru. The Games were organized by the Bolivarian Sports Organization (ODEBO).

The opening ceremony that took place on October 17, 1997, at the Estadio Monumental de la Universidad Nacional San Agustín in Arequipa, Peru. The Games were officially opened by Peruvian president Alberto Fujimori. Torch lighter was 70-year-old former cyclist Hernán Llerena, who won 4 gold medals at the 1947–48 Bolivarian Games and another gold medal at the 1951 Bolivarian Games.

Gold medal winners from Ecuador were published by the Comité Olímpico Ecuatoriano.

== Participation ==
About 1710 athletes from 6 countries were reported to participate:

- Bolivia (324)
- Colombia (304)
- Ecuador (285)
- Panama (103)
- Peru (488)
- Venezuela (491)

The numbers might include coaches, because other sources publish smaller numbers.

== Sports ==
The following 20 sports (+ 1 exhibition) were explicitly mentioned:

- Aquatic sports
  - Swimming
- Athletics
- Basketball
- Bowling
- Boxing
- Climbing^{†}
- Cycling
  - Road cycling
  - Track cycling
- Equestrian
- Fencing
- Football^{‡}
- Gymnastics
  - Artistic gymnastics
- Judo
- Karate
- Shooting
- Softball
- Table tennis
- Taekwondo
- Tennis
- Volleyball
- Weightlifting
- Wrestling

^{†}: Exhibition event.
^{‡}: The competition was reserved to youth representatives (U-17).

== Medal count ==
The medal count for these Games is tabulated below. This table is sorted by the number of gold medals earned by each country. The number of silver medals is taken into consideration next, and then the number of bronze medals.

1997 Bolivarian Games Medal Count
| Rank | Nation | Gold | Silver | Bronze | Total |
| 1 | Venezuela | 121 | 110 | 84 | 315 |
| 2 | Colombia | 119 | 93 | 75 | 287 |
| 3 | Peru | 50 | 66 | 95 | 211 |
| 4 | Ecuador | 24 | 37 | 73 | 134 |
| 5 | Bolivia | 4 | 5 | 24 | 33 |
| 6 | Panama | 2 | 5 | 17 | 24 |
| Total | | 320 | 316 | 368 | 1004 |
