= Bolas criollas =

Traditional team sport from Venezuela

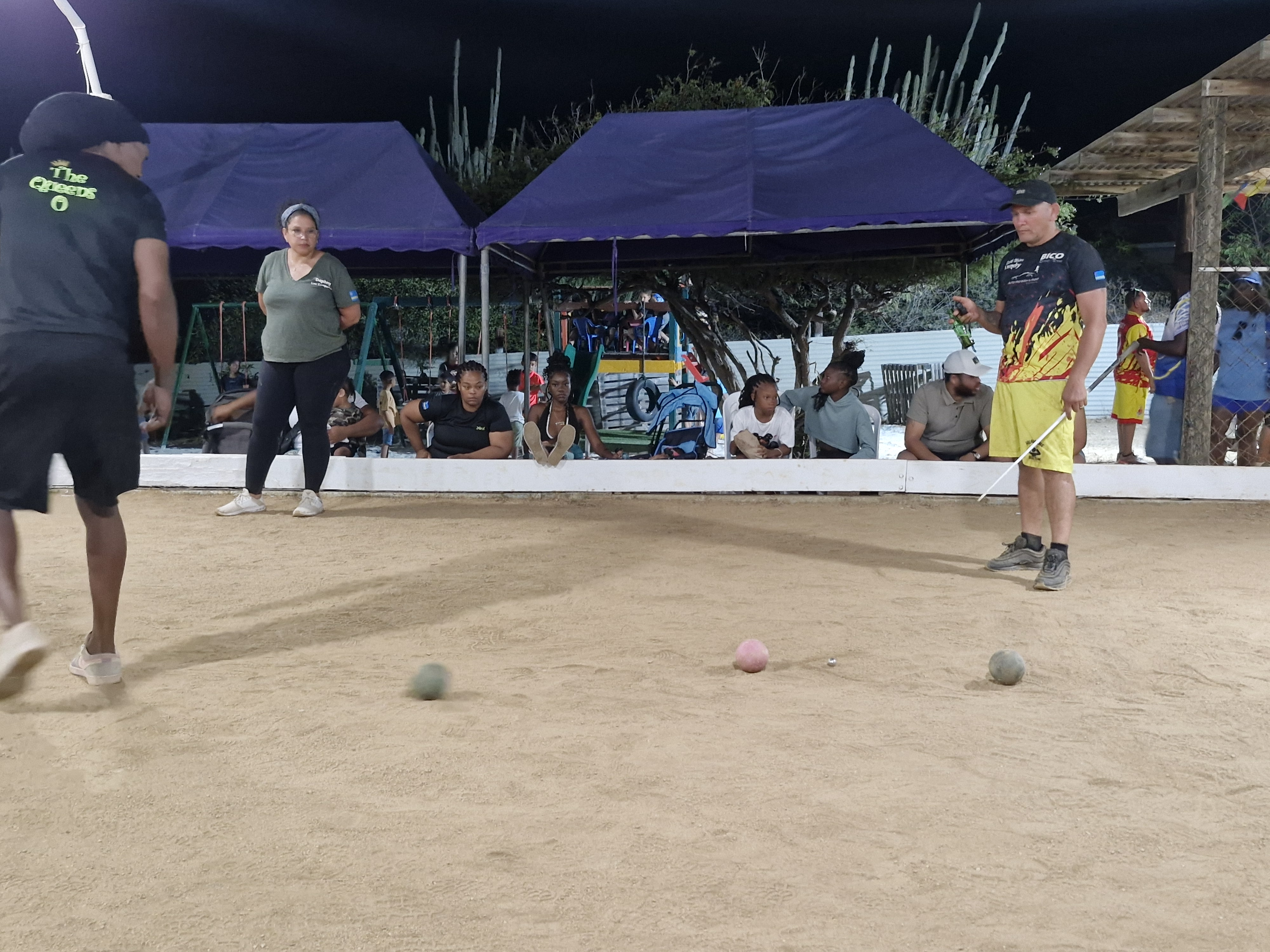
2025 Aruba International Bolas Criollas Tournament, Papaya Ranch

Bolas criollas is a traditional team sport from Venezuela, very popular in the Llanos and most rural regions. It is one of the most representative icons of Llanero culture. Its origins can be traced back to traditional European boules sports, such as bocce and pétanque.

== Objective ==
Two teams of two participants equipped with eight heavy balls throw in turns and attempt to place them as close as possible to a much smaller metal ball. The team that reaches a maximum of 20 points in several attempts wins the match.

== Description ==
It is played in a court shaped as a large level rectangle, built of flattened earth (typically rich in sand or clay), clear of trees or visible obstacles. The court must keep a 3:2 proportion ratio and its actual dimensions may vary, but an approximate size of 20 by 30 metres (22 yd × 33 yd) is preferred. The court is usually enclosed with logs, wooden boards, or concrete slabs. On occasion, an internal string perimeter fitted at no more than 20 centimetres (8 in) from the enclosure signals valid gaming ground. The solid balls (roughly 15 centimetres (6 in) diameter, made of synthetic material) are colored red and green respectively to separate each team. The small steel or iron ball called Mingo has a diameter no greater than 5 centimetres (2 in) and is used as a marker. At the beginning of a match, a previously drawn member of either team throws the Mingo from one established end of the court (called the calzador) to the opposite end. If the Mingo rests in the opposite half of the court, the toss is valid. From then, participants of each team alternatively toss one ball each from the calzador attempting to make their balls rest as close to the Mingo as possible (or touch it). After all balls have been thrown, a designated judge awards points to the winning team based on their balls' proximity to the Mingo. If the match is not ended with a winning score, the whole routine is repeated from the alternate end (for ease, as there is no need to carry the heavy balls back to the original place). A valid toss in bolas criollas is done with the palm of the hand facing downward (in opposition to bowling, for example), and the arm must swing in a graceful arc, body resting on one flexed leg and the other leg extended. Running to gain momentum is allowed, as long as the player does not overshoot the calzador.

== Scoring ==
Points are awarded in the following fashion: the judge identifies the winning color as the ball that is closest to the Mingo. An imaginary circle with the Mingo in the center is drawn, its radius being the center of the first ball of the opposite color. Any balls of the winning color that fall within this circle are counted as points. A maximum of eight and a minimum of zero (a draw) can be counted by each "set". As measurements can be imprecise and somewhat subjective in loose soil, discussions frequently arise. The judge may require a bit of string (to use as a "ruler") or other tools, and more than one judge may be required for unbiased decisions. When not officially competing, participants may use steps (counting the number of steps placed in front of the other - tip to the heel to the Mingo), outstretched hands, twigs, or whatever means available, giving rise to somewhat hilarious situations.

== Tricks and moves ==
Though a simple game, experienced bolas criollas players display great skill at their throws. Several valid moves and tricks are commonly exploited that completely alter the course of a game.

- Arrime - When a player throws a ball in a gently calculated arc and lands just beside the Mingo.
- Boche - A difficult move where a skilled thrower hits the winning ball of an opponent with his own, displacing the opponent's ball and leaving the thrower's team in a winning position. An alternative version of this move is hitting the Mingo itself, thus completely changing the geometry of the game.
- Clavao - A Boche with effect, that leaves the "aggressive" ball in the exact position of the original ball as if "nailed".

== History ==
The first report about the arrival of this game to Venezuela mentions that Spanish monks brought it with the conquistadores. Since 1930, it has become widely popular, but it was not until 1956, on the occasion of the first National Sports Games event, that the Venezuelan Federation of Criollas Balls was founded, with the official rules being set shortly after. Since then, it has been one of the most popular attractions at this event. The National Bolas Criollas Championship takes place every year during the months of August and September. The game is also very popular in Colombia (mainly in the city of Cúcuta) and in Cuba.

== See also ==
- Bowls
