= Coleo =

Venezuelan/Colombian sport similar to rodeo

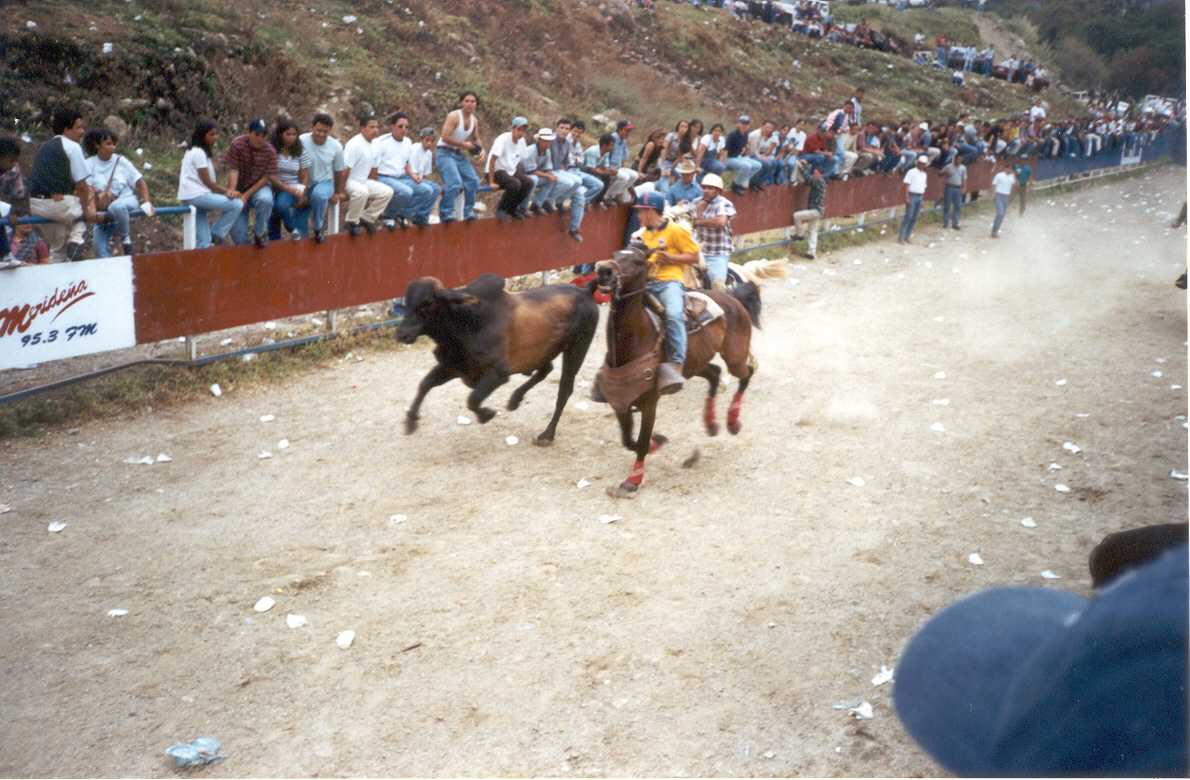
Venezuelan coleo: Llanero on horseback chasing cattle at high speed

Coleo is a traditional Venezuelan and Colombian sport, very similar to a rodeo, where a small group of llaneros (cowboys) on horseback pursue cattle at high speeds through a narrow pathway (called a manga de coleo) in order to drop or tumble them.

Coleos are usually presented as a side attraction to a larger event, such as a religious festival. They are very popular in Venezuela and in parts of Colombia, mostly in the plains (llanos). In September 2025 Colombia's Constitutional Court banned coleos throughout the country.

A coleo starts with the participants and a calf or bull (this depends on the age and stature of the competitors) locked behind a trap door. The trap door leads to a narrow earthen pathway about 100 metres (330 ft) long with high guard rails, open at the other end. When a judge gives a signal, the calf is set loose and starts running. A couple of seconds later, the riders are released and they race to grab the calf by its tail. The rider who accomplishes this first will increase speed, dragging the calf until it finally stumbles. The object is to accomplish this in the shortest time.

Coleo can be a dangerous sport, and most of the participants are male. However coleos in which all the contestants are female are not uncommon. Accidents can happen, because the riders compete aggressively and ride at high speed with minimal bodily protection. Additionally, some spectators attend coleos sitting on top of the high guard rails, and the occasional excited or drunken spectator may fall or collide with the riders or the bull itself.

== See also ==
- Bullfighting
- Campdrafting
- Charrería
- Chilean rodeo
