= 1947–48 Bolivarian Games =

II Bolivarian Games
- Host city: Lima
- Country: PER
- Nations: 6
- Athletes: 931
- Events: 22 sports
- Opening: December 25, 1947
- Closing: January 8, 1948
- Opened by: José Luís Bustamante y Rivero
- Main venue: Estadio Nacional de Perú

The II Bolivarian Games (Spanish: Juegos Bolivarianos) were a multi-sport event held between December 25, 1947, and January 8, 1948, at the Estadio Nacional de Perú in Lima, Peru. The Games were organized by the Bolivarian Sports Organization (ODEBO).

Originally, the Games were scheduled until January 6, 1948. However, during the Games, the organizing committee realized that the football competition and some other events could not be finished in time, and decided to extend until January 8, 1948.

The Games were officially opened by Peruvian president José Luís Bustamante y Rivero. The Colegio Militar Leoncio Prado in Callao served as "Bolivarian Village" (Villa Bolivariana) to host the athletes.

A detailed history of the early editions of the Bolivarian Games between 1938 and 1989 was published in a book written (in Spanish) by José Gamarra Zorrilla, former president of the Bolivian Olympic Committee, and first president (1976–1982) of ODESUR. Gold medal winners from Ecuador were published by the Comité Olímpico Ecuatoriano.

Some photos from the cycling events can be found on the webpage in honour of Peruvian cyclist Pedro Mathey.

== Venue ==
Lima
Estadio Nacional
Capacity: 40,000
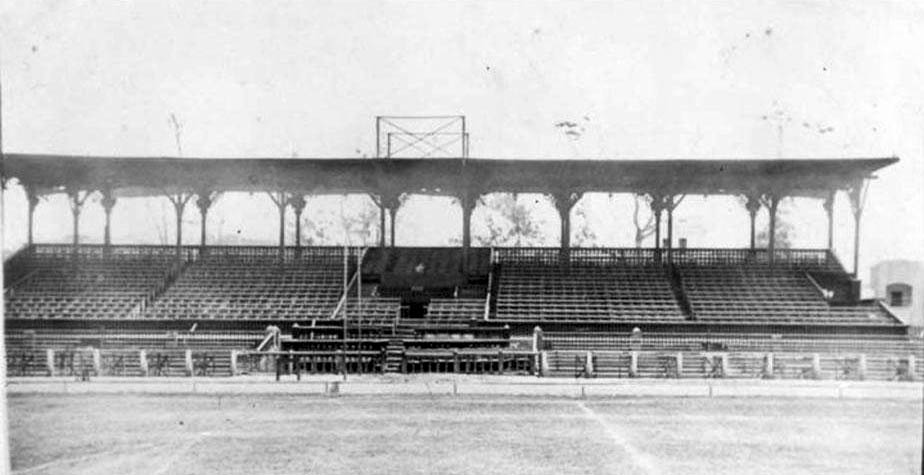

== Participation ==
As of December 23, 1947, a total of 931 athletes from 6 countries were reported to participate:

- Bolivia (103)
- Colombia (180)
- Ecuador (78)
- Panama (50)
- Peru (400)
- Venezuela (120)

Another source reports the participation of only 600 athletes.

== Sports ==
It is reported that the Games featured 22 disciplines. The following sports were explicitly mentioned:

- Aquatic sports
  - Diving
  - Swimming
  - Water polo
- Athletics
- Baseball
- Basketball
- Billiards
- Boxing
- Chess
- Cycling
  - Road cycling
  - Track cycling
- Equestrian
- Fencing
- Football
- Golf
- Shooting
- Tennis
- Volleyball
- Weightlifting
- Wrestling

The list is incomplete.

== Medal count ==
The medal count for these Games is tabulated below. This table is sorted by the number of gold medals earned by each country. The number of silver medals is taken into consideration next, and then the number of bronze medals.

1947–48 Bolivarian Games Medal Count
Rank	Nation	Gold	Silver	Bronze	Total
1	Peru	65	52	43	160
2	Panama	15	7	4	26
3	Colombia	13	18	17	48
4	Bolivia	9	13	10	32
5	Venezuela	8	11	6	25
6	Ecuador	5	6	18	29
Total		115	107	98	320
