= 2005 Bolivarian Games =

XV Bolivarian Games
- Host city: Armenia, Quindío; Pereira, Risaralda
- Country: Colombia
- Motto: La fuerza de una región (The power of a region)
- Nations: 6
- Athletes: 2026
- Events: 28 sports
- Opening: August 12, 2005
- Closing: August 21, 2005
- Opened by: Álvaro Uribe
- Athlete's Oath: Óscar Figueroa
- Torch lighter: Rubén Darío Gómez
- Main venue: Estadio Centenario (Armenia); Estadio Hernán Ramírez Villegas (Pereira)

The XV Bolivarian Games (Spanish: Juegos Bolivarianos) were a multi-sport event held between 12–21 August 2005 in Armenia and Pereira, Colombia. Some events took place in Cartagena de Indias and in Bogotá. The Games were organized by the Bolivarian Sports Organization (ODEBO).

The opening ceremony took place on August 12, 2005, at the Estadio Hernán Ramírez Villegas in Pereira, Colombia. The Games were officially opened by Colombian president Álvaro Uribe. Torch lighter was former road racing cyclist Rubén Darío Gómez, gold medallist at the 1961 Bolivarian Games. The athlete's oath was sworn by weightlifter Óscar Figueroa

== Venues ==
Armenia hosted the following competitions: athletics (Pista Atlética La Villa), basketball (Coliseo del Café), billiards (Bolo Club de Armenia), boxing (Coliseo Municipal de La Tebaida), fencing (Coliseo Colegio San Luis Rey), football (Estadio Centenario), artistic gymnastics (Coliseo de Gimnasia), rhythmic gymnastics (Coliseo del Sur), karate (Coliseo Municipal de Calarca), roller speed skating road (Pista Estadio Centenario), roller speed skating track (Patinodromo Parque de la Vida), squash (Canchas Universidad del Quindío and Portal del Quindío), table tennis (Coliseo Universidad del Quindío), wrestling (Coliseo del INEM)

Pereira hosted the following competitions: archery (Cancha Liga de Fútbol Villa Olímpica), beach volleyball (Parque Metropolitano del Café), bowling (Bolera Pereira), BMX racing (Parque Metropolitano del Café), mountain biking (Parque Metropolitano del Café), road cycling, track cycling (Velódromo Alfonso Hurtado Sarria), diving (Piscinas Olímpicas Villa), football (Estadio Hernán Ramírez Villegas), judo (Coliseo Menor), racquetball (Canchas Universidad Tecnológica de Pereira), shooting (Club de Tiro Punto 30), swimming (Piscinas Olímpicas Villa), taekwondo (Coliseo Menor), tennis (Tenis Country Club), volleyball (Coliseo Mayor), weightlifting (Coliseo Instituto Técnico Superior)

Cartagena hosted the following competitions: baseball^{†} (Estadio 11 de Noviembre), canoeing (Laguna Luruaco), softball^{†} (Estadio Unidad Deportiva El Campestre), triathlon (Boca Grande and Castillo Grande), yachting (Bahía de Cartagena)
^{†}: Event initially scheduled, but cancelled at short notice.

Bogotá hosted the following competitions: equestrianism (Country Club), water skiing (Parque Simón Bolívar)

== Participation ==
About 2026 athletes from 6 countries were reported to participate:

- Bolivia (208)
- Colombia (608)
- Ecuador (373)
- Panama (18)
- Peru (201)
- Venezuela (615)

== Sports ==
Both baseball and softball competitions were cancelled at short notice. The following 28 sports were explicitly mentioned:

- Aquatic sports
  - Diving
  - Swimming (details)
- Archery
- Athletics
- Basketball
- Billiards
- Bowling
- Boxing
- Canoeing
- Cycling
  - BMX racing
  - Mountain biking
  - Road cycling
  - Track cycling
- Equestrian
- Fencing
- Football (details)^{‡}
- Gymnastics
  - Artistic gymnastics
  - Rhythmic gymnastics
- Judo
- Karate
- Racquetball
- Roller speed skating
- Sailing
- Shooting
- Squash
- Table tennis
- Taekwondo
- Tennis
- Triathlon
- Volleyball
  - Beach volleyball
  - Volleyball
- Water skiing
- Weightlifting
- Wrestling

^{‡}: The competition was reserved to youth representatives (U-17).

== Medal count ==
The medal count for these Games is tabulated below. This table is sorted by the number of gold medals earned by each country. The number of silver medals is taken into consideration next, and then the number of bronze medals.

2005 Bolivarian Games Medal Count
| Rank | Nation | Gold | Silver | Bronze | Total |
| 1 | Venezuela | 179 | 136 | 105 | 420 |
| 2 | Colombia | 173 | 181 | 116 | 470 |
| 3 | Ecuador | 25 | 68 | 136 | 229 |
| 4 | Peru | 25 | 19 | 58 | 102 |
| 5 | Bolivia | 10 | 10 | 43 | 63 |
| 6 | Panama | 2 | 2 | 7 | 11 |
| Total | | 414 | 416 | 465 | 1295 |
