= 1989 Bolivarian Games =

XI Bolivarian Games
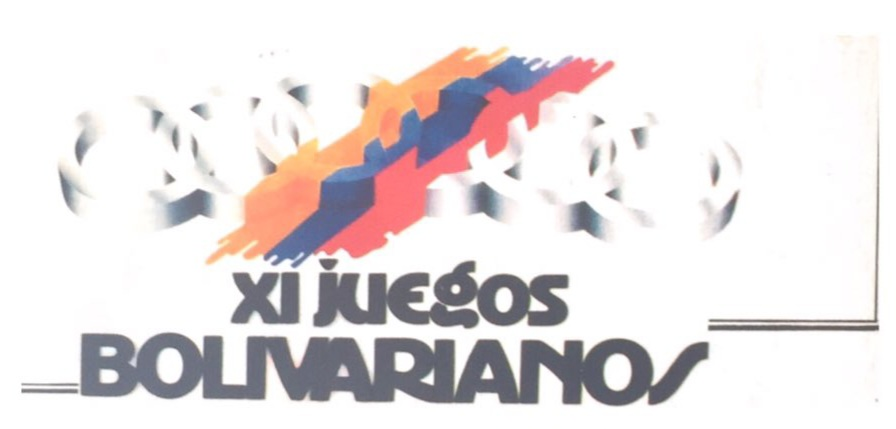
- Host city: Maracaibo, Zulia
- Country: Venezuela
- Nations: 6
- Athletes: 1286
- Events: 20 sports (+ 2 exhibition)
- Opening: January 14, 1989
- Closing: January 25, 1989
- Opened by: Jaime Lusinchi
- Torch lighter: Carlos Leal
- Main venue: Estadio Olímpico Pachencho Romero

The XI Bolivarian Games (Spanish: Juegos Bolivarianos) were a multi-sport event held between January 14–25, 1989, in Maracaibo, Venezuela. The Games were organized by the Bolivarian Sports Organization (ODEBO).

The opening ceremony took place on January 14, 1989, at the Estadio Olímpico Pachencho Romero in Maracaibo, Venezuela. The Games were officially opened by Venezuelan president Jaime Lusinchi. Torch lighter was 76-year-old former tennis player and gold medalist Carlos Leal.

A detailed history of the early editions of the Bolivarian Games between 1938 and 1989 was published in a book written (in Spanish) by José Gamarra Zorrilla, former president of the Bolivian Olympic Committee, and first president (1976–1982) of ODESUR. Gold medal winners from Ecuador were published by the Comité Olímpico Ecuatoriano.

== Participation ==
About 1286 athletes from 6 countries were reported to participate:

- Bolivia
- Colombia
- Ecuador
- Panama
- Peru
- Venezuela

== Sports ==
The following 20 sports (+ 2 exhibition events) were explicitly mentioned:

- Aquatic sports
  - Diving
  - Swimming
  - Synchronized swimming
- Athletics
- Baseball
- Basketball
- Bowling
- Boxing
- Caballos amaestrados (Dressage)^{†}
- Cycling
  - Road cycling
  - Track cycling
- Equestrian
- Fencing
- Gymnastics (artistic)
- Judo
- Karate^{†}
- Sailing
- Shooting
- Softball
- Table tennis
- Taekwondo
- Tennis
- Volleyball
- Weightlifting
- Wrestling

^{†}: Exhibition event.

== Medal count ==
The medal count for these Games is tabulated below. A slightly different number of medals was published elsewhere. This table is sorted by the number of gold medals earned by each country. The number of silver medals is taken into consideration next, and then the number of bronze medals.

1989 Bolivarian Games Medal Count
Rank	Nation	Gold	Silver	Bronze	Total
1	Venezuela	147	80	70	297
2	Colombia	64	68	116	208
3	Peru	31	31	47	109
4	Ecuador	19	52	51	122
5	Panama	5	11	17	33
6	Bolivia	1	11	17	29
Total		267	253	278	798
