= Arturo Cárdenas =

Mexican footballer (born 1999)

Personal information
- Full name: Arturo Naelson Cárdenas Delgado
- Date of birth: 15 April 1999 (age 27)
- Place of birth: San Nicolás de los Garza, Nuevo León, Mexico
- Height: 1.70 m (5 ft 7 in)
- Position: Defender

Team information
- Current team: Tepatitlán
- Number: 38

Youth career
- 2011–2015: Monterrey
- 2015–2018: Querétaro

Senior career*
Years	Team	Apps	(Gls)
2018–2019	Querétaro	0	(0)
2019	→ Sonora (loan)	3	(0)
2020–2021	Pumas Tabasco	22	(0)
2021–2022	Sinaloa	0	(0)
2022–2023	Atlante	5	(0)
2023–2026	Tritones Vallarta	32	(3)
2026–	Tepatitlán	1	(0)

International career^{‡}
2018–2019	Mexico U20	6	(0)
- * Club domestic league appearances and goals as of 5 December 2022 ‡ National team caps and goals as of 21 October 2019

Arturo Naelson Cárdenas Delgado (born 15 April 1999) is a Mexican professional footballer who plays as a defender for Liga de Expansión MX club Tepatitlán.

== International career ==
In April 2019, Cárdenas was included in the 21-player squad to represent Mexico at the U-20 World Cup in Poland.

== Career statistics ==
=== Club ===
As of 4 May 2019

Club	Season	League			Cup		Continental		Other		Total	
Club	Season	Division	Apps	Goals	Apps	Goals	Apps	Goals	Apps	Goals	Apps	Goals
Querétaro	2018–19	Liga MX	—		2	0	—		—		2	0
Career total			0	0	2	0	0	0	0	0	2	0

== Honours ==
Atlante

- Liga de Expansión MX: Apertura 2022
