= 1981 Bolivarian Games =

1981 sporting event

IX Bolivarian Games
- Host city: Barquisimeto, Lara
- Country: Venezuela
- Nations: 6
- Athletes: 1516
- Events: 18 sports
- Opening: December 4, 1981
- Closing: December 14, 1981
- Opened by: Luís Herrera Campins
- Torch lighter: Carmen Militza Pérez
- Main venue: Estadio de Barquisimeto

The IX Bolivarian Games (Spanish: Juegos Bolivarianos) were a multi-sport event held between December 4–14, 1981, at the Estadio de Barquisimeto in Barquisimeto, Venezuela. The Games were organized by the Bolivarian Sports Organization (ODEBO). In February 1980, Barquisimeto was chosen to substitute the initial host city Lima in Perú. The Comité Olímpico Peruano renounced because of financial problems.

The Games were officially opened by Venezuelan president Luís Herrera Campins. Torch lighter was fencer Carmen Militza Pérez.

A detailed history of the early editions of the Bolivarian Games between 1938 and 1989 was published in a book written (in Spanish) by José Gamarra Zorrilla, former president of the Bolivian Olympic Committee, and first president (1976–1982) of ODESUR. Gold medal winners from Ecuador were published by the Comité Olímpico Ecuatoriano.

A critical comment was published.

== Participation ==
A total of 1516 athletes from 6 countries were reported to participate:

- Bolivia
- Colombia
- Ecuador
- Panama
- Peru
- Venezuela

== Sports ==
The following 18 sports were explicitly mentioned:

- Aquatic sports
  - Diving
  - Swimming
- Athletics
- Baseball
- Basketball
- Bowling
- Boxing
- Cycling
  - Road cycling
  - Track cycling
- Fencing
- Football
- Gymnastics (artistic)
- Judo
- Shooting
- Softball
- Table tennis
- Tennis
- Volleyball
- Weightlifting
- Wrestling

== Medal count ==
The medal count for these games is tabulated below. This table is sorted by the number of gold medals earned by each country. The number of silver medals is taken into consideration next, and then the number of bronze medals.

1981 Bolivarian Games medal count
Rank	Nation	Gold	Silver	Bronze	Total
1	Venezuela	140	91	67	298
2	Colombia	39	52	53	144
3	Panama	25	22	34	81
4	Peru	16	37	40	93
5	Ecuador	12	28	28	68
6	Bolivia	3	7	17	27
Total		234	233	241	708
