= 1993 Bolivarian Games =

1993 multi-sport competition in Santa Cruz de la Sierra, Bolivia

XII Bolivarian Games
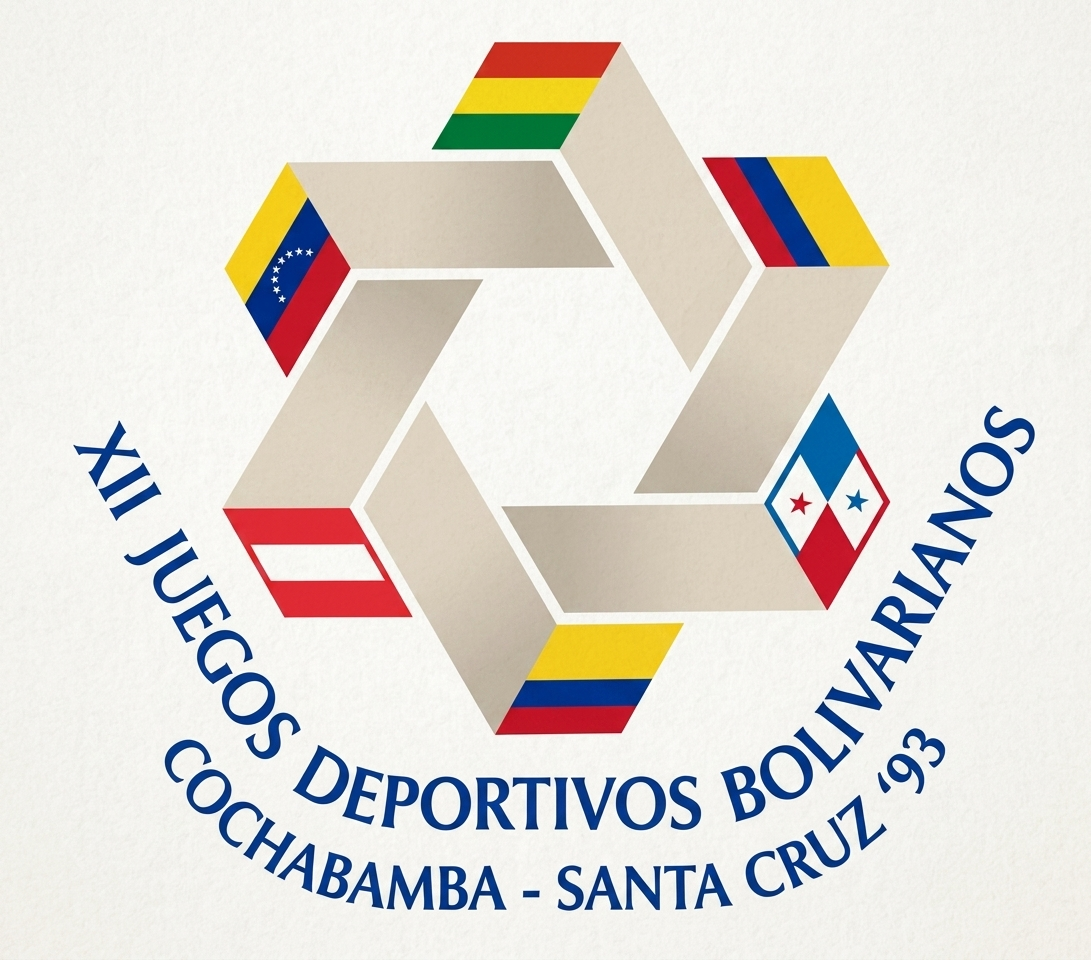
- Host city: Cochabamba, Cochabamba; Santa Cruz de la Sierra, Santa Cruz
- Country: Bolivia
- Nations: 6
- Athletes: 1300
- Events: 19 sports
- Opening: April 24, 1993
- Closing: May 2, 1993
- Opened by: Jaime Paz Zamora
- Torch lighter: Jhonny Pérez
- Main venue: Estadio Félix Capriles in Cochabamba; Estadio Ramón Tahuichi Aguilera in Santa Cruz

The XII Bolivarian Games (Spanish: Juegos Bolivarianos) were a multi-sport event held between April 24 - May 2, 1993, in Cochabamba and Santa Cruz de la Sierra, Bolivia. The Games were organized by the Bolivarian Sports Organization (ODEBO).

There were two opening ceremonies that took place on April 24, 1993, at the Estadio Félix Capriles in Cochabamba, and at the Estadio Ramón Tahuichi Aguilera in Santa Cruz, Bolivia.

In Cochabamba, the Games were officially opened by Bolivian president Jaime Paz Zamora. Torch lighter was long distance runner Jhonny Pérez, who won the silver medal in the 3000 metres steeplechase event at the 1981 Bolivarian Games.

Immediately after the end of the ceremony in Cochabamba, the president and a number of officials from the organizing committee rushed by plane to Santa Cruz to attend the other inauguration.

Gold medal winners from Ecuador were published by the Comité Olímpico Ecuatoriano.

== Venues ==
Cochabamba hosted the following sports: athletics (Estadio Félix Capriles), cycling (Circuito Bolivariano), football (Estadio Félix Capriles), judo, karate, racquetball (Country Club), table tennis (Coliseo José Castro), taekwondo, and volleyball.

Santa Cruz hosted the following sports: basketball, boxing (Coliseo John Pictor Blanco), equestrianism, fencing, gymnastics, shooting (Polígono de Santa Cruz), swimming, tennis, weightlifting (Coliseo Gilberto Menacho), and wrestling.

== Participation ==
About 1300 athletes from 6 countries were reported to participate:

- Bolivia
- Colombia (170)
- Ecuador
- Panama
- Peru (174)
- Venezuela

== Sports ==
The following 19 sports were explicitly mentioned:

- Aquatic sports
  - Swimming
- Athletics
- Basketball
- Boxing
- Cycling
  - Road cycling
  - Track cycling
- Equestrian
- Fencing
- Football^{†}
- Gymnastics (artistic)
- Judo
- Karate
- Racquetball
- Shooting
- Table tennis
- Taekwondo
- Tennis^{†}
- Volleyball
- Weightlifting
- Wrestling

^{†}: The competition was reserved to youth representatives (U-17).

== Medal count ==
The medal count for these Games is tabulated below. A slightly different number of medals was published elsewhere. This table is sorted by the number of gold medals earned by each country. The number of silver medals is taken into consideration next, and then the number of bronze medals.

1993 Bolivarian Games Medal Count
Rank	Nation	Gold	Silver	Bronze	Total
1	Venezuela	116	78	58	252
2	Colombia	84	54	31	169
3	Peru	32	43	56	131
4	Ecuador	22	46	69	137
5	Bolivia	12	48	80	140
6	Panama	10	6	18	34
Total		276	275	312	863
