= 1961 Bolivarian Games =

IV Bolivarian Games
- Host city: Barranquilla, Atlántico
- Country: Colombia
- Nations: 5
- Opening: December 3, 1961
- Closing: December 16, 1961
- Opened by: Alberto Lleras Camargo
- Athlete's Oath: Rafael Cotes
- Torch lighter: Jaime Aparicio
- Main venue: Estadio Municipal

The IV Bolivarian Games (Spanish: Juegos Bolivarianos) were a multi-sport event held between December 3–16, 1961, at the Estadio Municipal in Barranquilla, Colombia. The Games were organized by the Bolivarian Sports Organization (ODEBO). Bolivia was the only eligible country not to send a delegation.

The Games were officially opened by Colombian president Alberto Lleras Camargo. Torch lighter was hurdler Jaime Aparicio. The athlete's oath was sworn by local athlete Rafael Cotes.

A detailed history of the early editions of the Bolivarian Games between 1938 and 1989 was published in a book written (in Spanish) by José Gamarra Zorrilla, former president of the Bolivian Olympic Committee, and first president (1976-1982) of ODESUR. Gold medal winners from Ecuador were published by the Comité Olímpico Ecuatoriano.

== Participation ==
Athletes from 5 countries were reported to participate:

- Colombia
- Ecuador
- Panama
- Peru
- Venezuela

== Sports ==
The following sports were explicitly mentioned:

- Aquatic sports
  - Diving
  - Swimming
- Athletics
- Baseball
- Basketball
- Boxing
- Cycling
  - Road cycling
  - Track cycling
- Fencing
- Football
- Shooting
- Tennis
- Weightlifting
- Wrestling

The list might be incomplete.

== Medal count ==
The medal count for these Games is tabulated below. This table is sorted by the number of gold medals earned by each country. The number of silver medals is taken into consideration next, and then the number of bronze medals.

1961 Bolivarian Games Medal Count
Rank	Nation	Gold	Silver	Bronze	Total
1	Venezuela	76	37	52	165
2	Colombia	24	68	38	130
3	Panama	17	15	36	68
4	Peru	16	16	9	41
5	Ecuador	5	13	9	27
Total		138	149	144	431
