= 1951 Bolivarian Games =

III Bolivarian Games
- Host city: Caracas
- Country: Venezuela
- Nations: 6
- Athletes: 1010
- Opening: December 5, 1951
- Closing: December 21, 1951
- Opened by: Germán Suárez Flamerich
- Athlete's Oath: Leopoldo Márquez
- Torch lighter: Carlos Feo
- Main venue: Estadio Olímpico de la Universidad Central de Venezuela

The III Bolivarian Games (Spanish: Juegos Bolivarianos) were a multi-sport event held between December 5–21, 1951, at the Estadio Olímpico de la Universidad Central de Venezuela in Caracas, Venezuela. The Games were organized by the Bolivarian Sports Organization (ODEBO).

The Games were officially opened by Germán Suárez Flamerich, who became president of the "Junta de Gobierno" 1950-1952, after the assassination of Carlos Delgado Chalbaud.

A detailed history of the early editions of the Bolivarian Games between 1938 and 1989 was published in a book written (in Spanish) by José Gamarra Zorrilla, former president of the Bolivian Olympic Committee, and first president (1976-1982) of ODESUR. Gold medal winners from Ecuador were published by the Comité Olímpico Ecuatoriano.

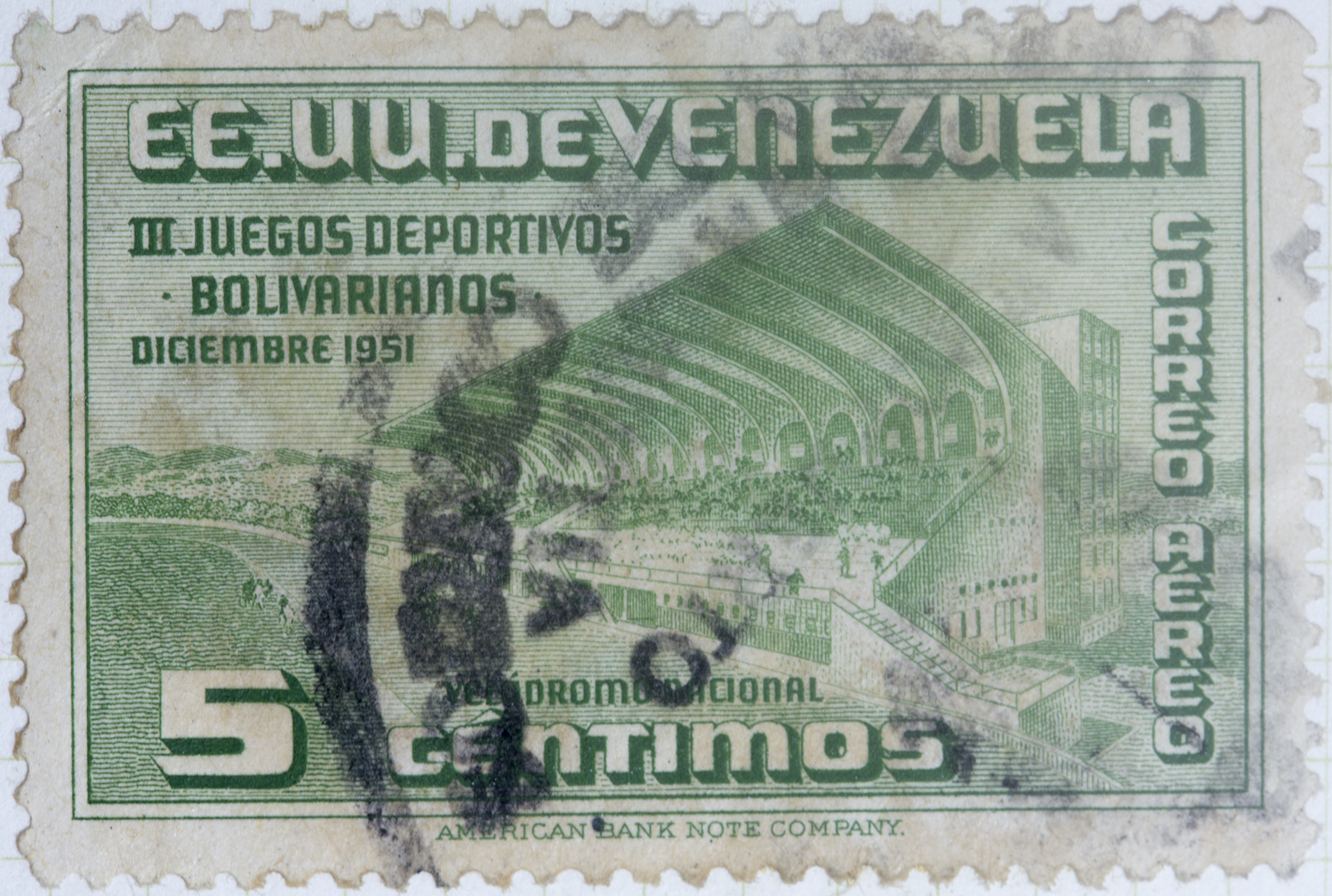
Stamp issued in 1951 about the III Bolivarian Games.

== Participation ==
A total of 1010 athletes from 6 countries were reported to participate:

- Bolivia
- Colombia
- Ecuador
- Panama
- Peru
- Venezuela

== Sports ==
The local Organizing Committee included three popular Venezuelan sports (Basque pelota, Bolas criollas, and Coleo) as exhibition events. The following sports were explicitly mentioned:

- Aquatic sports
  - Diving
  - Swimming
  - Water polo
- Athletics
- Baseball
- Basketball
- Basque pelota^{†}
- Billiards
- Bolas criollas^{†}
- Boxing
- Chess
- Coleo^{†}
- Cycling
  - Road cycling
  - Track cycling
- Equestrian
- Fencing
- Football
- Golf
- Modern pentathlon
- Shooting
- Table tennis
- Tennis
- Volleyball
- Weightlifting
- Wrestling

^{†}: Exhibition event.

The list might be incomplete.

== Medal count ==
The medal count for these Games is tabulated below. This table is sorted by the number of gold medals earned by each country. The number of silver medals is taken into consideration next, and then the number of bronze medals.

1951 Bolivarian Games Medal Count
Rank	Nation	Gold	Silver	Bronze	Total
1	Peru	40	39	25	104
2	Venezuela	33	31	31	95
3	Panama	18	7	12	37
4	Colombia	14	21	18	53
5	Ecuador	3	7	6	16
6	Bolivia	0	3	4	7
Total		108	108	96	312
