= ODESUR =

Multi-sports organisation

- Headquarters: Luque, Paraguay
- Region served: South America
- Members: 15 National Olympic Committees
- President: Camilo Pérez López Moreira
- Affiliations: Panam Sports
- Website: odesur.org

The Organización Deportiva Suramericana (ODESUR) is a multi-sports organisation. It organises the South American Games.

== Member nations ==
There are 15 affiliated National Olympic Committees:

Nation	National Olympic Committee
Argentina	Argentine Olympic Committee
Aruba	Aruban Olympic Committee
Bolivia	Bolivian Olympic Committee
Brazil	Brazilian Olympic Committee
Chile	Chilean Olympic Committee
Colombia	Colombian Olympic Committee
Curaçao	Curacao Sports Federation and Olympic Committee
Ecuador	Ecuadorian Olympic Committee
Guyana	Guyana Olympic Association
Panama	Panama Olympic Committee
Paraguay	Paraguayan Olympic Committee
Peru	Peruvian Olympic Committee
Surinam	Surinamese Olympic Committee
Uruguay	Uruguayan Olympic Committee
Venezuela	Venezuelan Olympic Committee
