= ODEBO =

Sports organization based in South America

Organización Deportiva Bolivariana
- Abbreviation: ODEBO
- Formation: August 16, 1938; 88 years ago
- Type: Sports
- Headquarters: Bogotá, Colombia
- Region served: South America
- President: Baltazar Medina
- Vice-president 1st: María Soto
- Vice-president 2nd: José Alvarez
- Website: odebo.org

Organización Deportiva Bolivariana (ODEBO; English: Bolivarian Sport Organization) is a sports organization based in South America. It organizes the Bolivarian Games.

== History ==
Old logo of ODEBO

The idea of creating a Bolivarian sports organization came to mind to the region's country leaders during the 1936 Berlin Olympic Games. Alberto Nariño Cheyne, Colombia's national director for sports, was at the forefront of the project. The ODEBO was created on 16 August 1938 by the Olympic committees of Bolivia, Colombia, Ecuador, Panama, Peru and Venezuela. Its creation was inaugurated at the Cundinamarca Palace in Bogota. Its headquarters opened in Caracas. The first Bolivarian Games were organized in 1938, the year of the organization's creation.

In May 2010, the ODEBO admitted Chile as a member of the organization. In February 2011, the ODEBO created the Bolivarian Beach Games and organized the first edition in Lima in 2012.

== Members ==
Members of the National Olympic Committees include:

Name	Olympic Committee	Admitted in
Bolivia	Bolivian Olympic Committee	1938
Chile	Chilean Olympic Committee	2010
Colombia	Colombian Olympic Committee	1938
Ecuador	Ecuadorian National Olympic Committee	1938
Panama	Panama Olympic Committee	1938
Peru	Peruvian Olympic Committee	1938
Venezuela	Venezuelan Olympic Committee	1938

== External website ==
- Official website
