= Athletics at the 1952 Summer Olympics – Men's high jump =

Men's high jump at the Games of the XV Olympiad
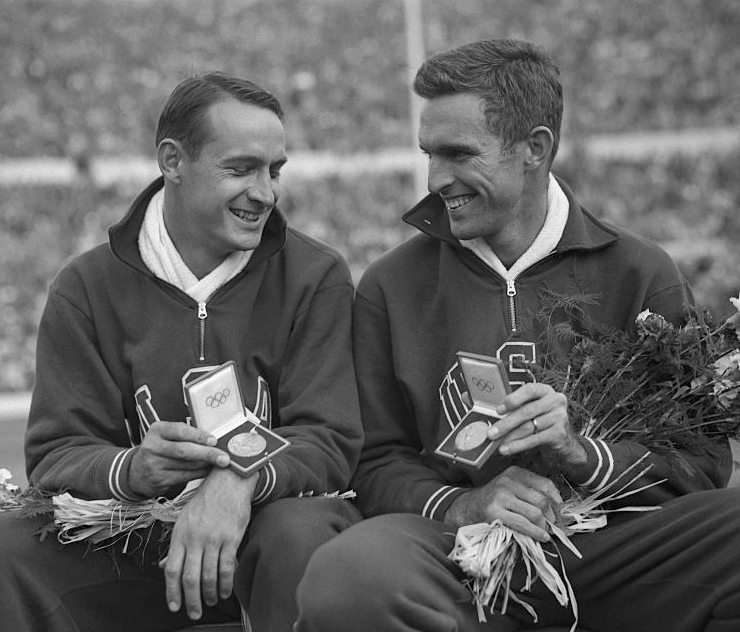
- Wiesner (left) and Davis
- Venue: Helsinki Olympic Stadium
- Date: July 20, 1952
- Competitors: 36 from 24 nations
- Winning height: 2.04 OR

Medalists
1st place, gold medalist(s)		Walt Davis	United States
2nd place, silver medalist(s)		Ken Wiesner	United States
3rd place, bronze medalist(s)		José da Conceição	Brazil

The men's high jump at the 1952 Olympic Games took place on 20 July at the Helsinki Olympic Stadium. Thirty-six athletes from 24 nations competed. The maximum number of athletes per nation had been set at 3 since the 1930 Olympic Congress. American athlete Walt Davis won the gold medal and set a new Olympic record. It was the Americans' 10th victory in the men's high jump. José da Conceição won Brazil's first medal in the men's high jump, with bronze.

== Background ==
This was the 12th appearance of the event, which is one of 12 athletics events to have been held at every Summer Olympics. The returning finalists from the 1948 Games were fifth-place finisher Georges Damitio of France, seventh-place finishers Alan Paterson of Great Britain and Hans Wahli of Switzerland, thirteenth-place finisher Birger Leirud of Norway, fourteenth-place finisher Hércules Azcune of Uruguay, and nineteenth-place finisher Bjørn Gundersen of Norway. The "heavy favorite" in 1952 was Walt Davis.

Ceylon, Egypt, Ghana, Indonesia, Israel, Nigeria, the Soviet Union, and Venezuela each made their debut in the event. The United States appeared for the 12th time, having competed at each edition of the Olympic men's high jump to that point.

== Competition format ==
The competition used the two-round format introduced in 1912. There were two distinct rounds of jumping with results cleared between rounds. The qualifying round had the bar set at 1.70 metres, 1.80 metres, 1.84 metres, and 1.87 metres; some jumpers apparently took jumps at lower heights as well. All jumpers clearing 1.87 metres in the qualifying round advanced to the final. The final had jumps at 1.70 metres (which most finalists skipped), 1.80 metres, 1.90 metres, 1.95 metres, 1.98 metres, 2.01 metres, 2.04 metres, and 2.07 metres. Each athlete had three attempts at each height.

== Records ==
Prior to this competition, the existing world and Olympic records were as follows.

World record	Lester Steers (USA)	2.11	Los Angeles, United States	17 June 1941
Olympic record	Cornelius Johnson (USA)	2.03	Berlin, Germany	2 August 1936

Walt Davis cleared 2.04 metres to break the Olympic record. His attempts at 2.07 metres were unsuccessful.

== Schedule ==
All times are Eastern European Summer Time (UTC+3)

Date	Time	Round
Sunday, 20 July 1952	10:00; 15:00	Qualifying; Final

== Results ==
Key

- o = Height cleared
- x = Height failed
- – = Height passed
- r = Retired
- SB = Season's best
- PB = Personal best
- NR = National record
- AR = Area record
- OR = Olympic record
- WR = World record
- WL = World lead
- NM = No mark
- DNS = Did not start
- DQ = Disqualified

=== Qualifying round ===
Qualification Criteria: Qualifying Performance 1.87 advance to the Final.

Rank	Group	Athlete	Nation	1.70	1.80	1.84	1.87	Height	Notes
1	A	Arnold Betton	United States	—	—	—	o	1.87	Q
1	A	Walt Davis	United States	—	—	—	o	1.87	Q
1	B	Gösta Svensson	Sweden	—	—	—	o	1.87	Q
4	A	Bjørn Gundersen	Norway	—	—	o	o	1.87	Q
4	B	Josia Majekodummi	Nigeria	—	—	o	o	1.87	Q
4	B	Nafiu Osagie	Nigeria	—	—	o	o	1.87	Q
4	B	James Owoo	Ghana	—	—	o	o	1.87	Q
4	B	Ken Wiesner	United States	—	—	o	o	1.87	Q
9	A	Boniface Guobadia	Nigeria	—	o	o	o	1.87	Q
10	A	Claude Bénard	France	o	o	o	o	1.87	Q
10	A	Jacques Delelienne	Belgium	o	o	o	o	1.87	Q
10	A	Mihajlo Dimitrijević	Yugoslavia	o	o	o	o	1.87	Q
10	A	Pekka Halme	Finland	o	o	o	o	1.87	Q
10	A	Albert Koskinen	Finland	o	o	o	o	1.87	Q
10	B	Alan Paterson	Great Britain	o	o	o	o	1.87	Q
10	B	Ron Pavitt	Great Britain	o	o	o	o	1.87	Q
10	B	José da Conceição	Brazil	o	o	o	o	1.87	Q
10	B	Hans Wahli	Switzerland	o	o	o	o	1.87	Q
10	B	Peter Wells	Great Britain	o	o	o	o	1.87	Q
20	A	Georges Damitio	France	?	?	?	o	1.87	Q, one miss before 1.87
21	B	Birger Leirud	Norway	—	?	?	o	1.87	Q, two misses before 1.87
22	B	Arne Ljungqvist	Sweden	—	—	—	xo	1.87	Q
22	B	Ioan Soter	Romania	—	—	—	xo	1.87	Q
24	A	Yury Ilyasov	Soviet Union	—	?	?	xo	1.87	Q, two misses before 1.87
25	A	Pat Leane	Australia	?	?	?	xo	1.87	Q, two misses before 1.87
26	B	Maram Sudarmodjo	Indonesia	—	o	o	xxo	1.87	Q
27	A	Teófilo Davis	Venezuela	o	o	o	xxo	1.87	Q
28	B	Yevhen Vansovych	Soviet Union	—	?	?	xxo	1.87	Q, two misses before 1.87
29	A	Nagalingam Ethirveerasingam	Ceylon	?	?	o	xxx	1.84	Two misses before 1.84, started under 1.70 metres
30	A	Walter Herssens	Belgium	o	o	xxo	xxx	1.84	Started under 1.70 metres
31	A	Andres Franco	Philippines	?	?	xxo	xxx	1.84	One miss before 1.84, started under 1.70 metres
32	A	Hércules Azcune	Uruguay	o	o	xxx	—N/a	1.80	
32	A	Ernesto Lagos	Chile	o	o	xxx	—N/a	1.80	
34	B	Mehnga Singh	India	o	xxx	—N/a		1.70	
35	A	Arieh Batun-Kleinstub	Israel	o	xxx	—N/a		1.70	Started under 1.70 metres
36	B	Emad El-Din Shafei	Egypt	xo	xxx	—N/a		1.70	
	?	Oleg Mamonov	Soviet Union	—N/a				DNS	
	?	Kamtorn Sanidwong	Thailand	—N/a				DNS	

=== Final ===
The final was held on July 20.

Rank	Athlete	Nation	1.70	1.80	1.90	1.95	1.98	2.01	2.04	2.07	Height	Notes
1st place, gold medalist(s)	Walt Davis	United States	–	o	o	o	o	o	o	xxx	2.04	OR
2nd place, silver medalist(s)	Ken Wiesner	United States	–	o	o	o	o	o	xxx	—N/a	2.01	
3rd place, bronze medalist(s)	José da Conceição	Brazil	–	o	o	o	o	xxx	—N/a		1.98	
4	Gösta Svensson	Sweden	–	–	o	–	xxo	xxx	—N/a		1.98	
5	Ron Pavitt	Great Britain	o	o	o	o	xxx	—N/a			1.95	
6	Ioan Soter	Romania	–	–	o	xo	xxx	—N/a			1.95	
7	Arnold Betton	United States	–	o	o	xo	xxx	—N/a			1.95	
8	Bjørn Gundersen	Norway	–	–	o	xxx	—N/a				1.90	
9	Jacques Delelienne	Belgium	–	o	o	xxx	—N/a				1.90	
9	Josiah Majekodunmi	Nigeria	–	o	o	xxx	—N/a				1.90	
11	Pekka Halme	Finland	o	o	o	xxx	—N/a				1.90	
11	Peter Wells	Great Britain	o	o	o	xxx	—N/a				1.90	
13	Georges Damitio	France	–	xo	o	xxx	—N/a				1.90	
13	Yury Ilyasov	Soviet Union	–	xo	o	xxx	—N/a				1.90	
15	Arne Ljungqvist	Sweden	–	–	xxo	xxx	—N/a				1.90	
16	Hans Wahli	Switzerland	–	o	xo	xxx	—N/a				1.90	
17	Birger Leirud	Norway	–	–	xxo	xxx	—N/a				1.90	
18	Claude Bénard	France	–	o	xxo	xxx	—N/a				1.90	
18	Nafiu Osagie	Nigeria	–	o	xxo	xxx	—N/a				1.90	
20	Mihajlo Dimitrijević	Yugoslavia	–	o	xxx	—N/a					1.80	
20	Boniface Guobadia	Nigeria	–	o	xxx	—N/a					1.80	
20	James Owoo	Ghana	–	o	xxx	—N/a					1.80	
20	Maram Sudarmodjo	Indonesia	–	o	xxx	—N/a					1.80	
24	Téofilo Davis	Venezuela	o	o	xxx	—N/a					1.80	
24	Albert Koskinen	Finland	o	o	xxx	—N/a					1.80	
24	Pat Leane	Australia	o	o	xxx	—N/a					1.80	
24	Alan Paterson	Great Britain	o	o	xxx	—N/a					1.80	
28	Yevhen Vansovych	Soviet Union	–	xo	xxx	—N/a					1.80	
