= 1950 European Athletics Championships – Men's high jump =

Men's high jump at the European Athletics Championships

The men's high jump at the 1950 European Athletics Championships was held in Brussels, Belgium, at Heysel Stadium on 25 and 27 August 1950.

== Medalists ==
| Gold | Alan Paterson; Great Britain |
| Silver | Arne Åhman; Sweden |
| Bronze | Claude Bénard; France |

== Results ==
=== Final ===
27 August

| Rank | Name | Nationality | Result | Notes |
|---|---|---|---|---|
| 1st place, gold medalist(s) | Alan Paterson | Great Britain | 1.96 | |
| 2nd place, silver medalist(s) | Arne Åhman | Sweden | 1.93 | |
| 3rd place, bronze medalist(s) | Claude Bénard | France | 1.93 | |
| 4 | Hans Wahli | Switzerland | 1.90 | |
| 5 | Gösta Svensson | Sweden | 1.90 | |
| 6 | Georges Damitio | France | 1.90 | |
| 7 | Jacques Delelienne | Belgium | 1.85 | |
| 8 | Yuriy Ilyasov | Soviet Union | 1.85 | |
| 9 | Mihajlo Dimitrijević | Yugoslavia | 1.85 | |
| 10 | Walter Herssens | Belgium | 1.85 | |

=== Qualification ===
25 August

| Rank | Name | Nationality | Result | Notes |
|---|---|---|---|---|
| | Jacques Delelienne | Belgium | 1.90 | Q |
| | Arne Åhman | Sweden | 1.90 | Q |
| | Georges Damitio | France | 1.90 | Q |
| | Alan Paterson | Great Britain | 1.90 | Q |
| | Hans Wahli | Switzerland | 1.90 | Q |
| | Gösta Svensson | Sweden | 1.85 | Q |
| | Claude Bénard | France | 1.85 | Q |
| | Walter Herssens | Belgium | 1.85 | Q |
| | Mihajlo Dimitrijević | Yugoslavia | 1.85 | Q |
| | Yuriy Ilyasov | Soviet Union | 1.85 | Q |
| | Ronald Pavitt | Great Britain | 1.80 | |

== Participation ==
According to an unofficial count, 11 athletes from 7 countries participated in the event.

- Belgium (2)
- France (2)
- Soviet Union (1)
- Sweden (2)
- Switzerland (1)
- Great Britain (2)
- Yugoslavia (1)
