= Athletics at the 1948 Summer Olympics – Men's high jump =

Men's high jump at the Games of the XIV Olympiad
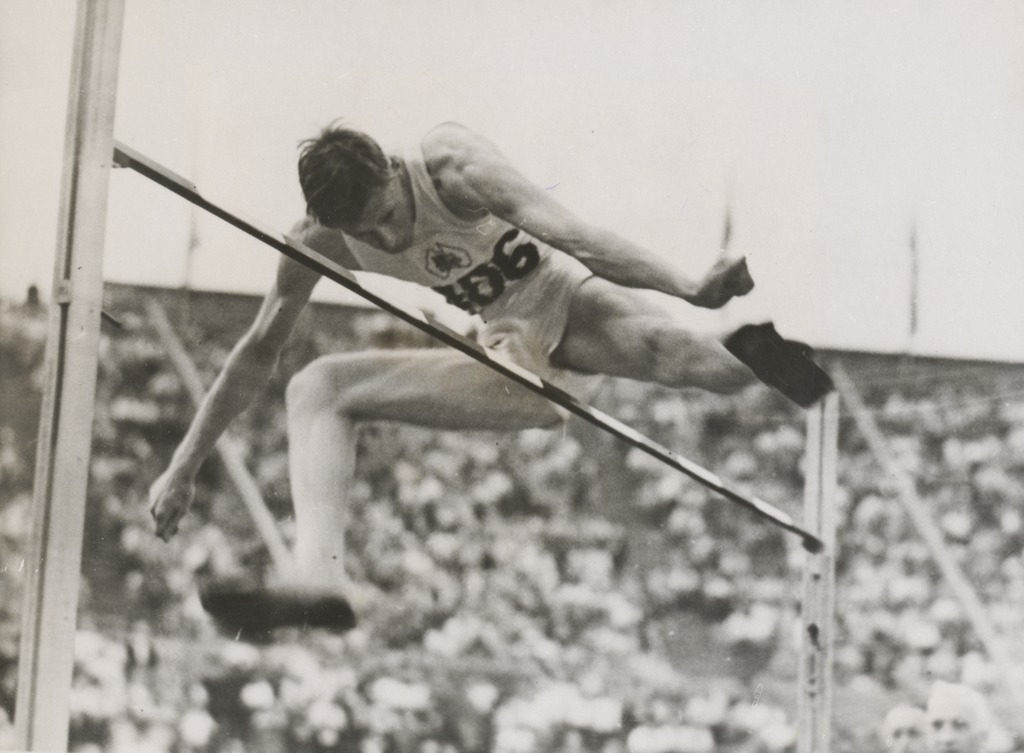
- John Winter jumping
- Venue: Wembley Stadium
- Dates: July 30, 1948 (qualifying and final)
- Competitors: 27 from 16 nations
- Winning height: 1.98

Medalists
1st place, gold medalist(s)		John Winter; Australia
2nd place, silver medalist(s)		Bjorn Paulson; Norway
3rd place, bronze medalist(s)		George Stanich; United States

The men's high jump event was part of the track and field athletics programme at the 1948 Summer Olympics. The competition was held on July 30, 1948. Twenty-seven athletes from 16 nations competed. The maximum number of athletes per nation had been set at 3 since the 1930 Olympic Congress. The final was won by John Winter of Australia. It was Australia's first victory in the men's high jump, and only the second time a jumper from outside the United States had won. Bjorn Paulson earned Norway's first medal in the event with a silver. George Stanich took bronze, keeping alive the United States' streak of medaling in every edition of the men's high jump.

== Background ==
This was the 11th appearance of the event, which is one of 12 athletics events to have been held at every Summer Olympics. None of the finalists from the pre-war 1936 Games returned. The American team, which had won 9 of 10 Olympics and had "dominated the world lists in 1948," was favored.

India, Puerto Rico, Singapore, and Uruguay each made their debut in the event. The United States appeared for the 11th time, having competed at each edition of the Olympic men's high jump to that point.

== Competition format ==
The competition used the two-round format introduced in 1912. There were two distinct rounds of jumping with results cleared between rounds. The qualifying round had the bar set at 1.60 metres, 1.70 metres, 1.80 metres, 1.84 metres, and 1.87 metres. All jumpers clearing 1.87 metres in the qualifying round advanced to the final. The final had jumps at 1.80 metres, 1.87 metres, 1.90 metres, 1.95 metres, and 1.98 metres. This competition used the tie-breaker rule of fewer-misses for the first time.

== Records ==
Prior to the competition, the existing world and Olympic records were as follows.

World record	Les Steers (USA)	2.11	Los Angeles, United States	17 June 1941
Olympic record	Cornelius Johnson (USA)	2.03	Berlin, Germany	2 August 1936

== Schedule ==
All times are British Summer Time (UTC+1)

Date	Time	Round
Friday, 30 July 1948	11:00; 16:30	Qualifying; Final

== Results ==
Key

- o = Height cleared
- x = Height failed
- – = Height passed
- r = Retired
- SB = Season's best
- PB = Personal best
- NR = National record
- AR = Area record
- OR = Olympic record
- WR = World record
- WL = World lead
- NM = No mark
- DNS = Did not start
- DQ = Disqualified

=== Qualifying round ===
Qual. rule: qualification standard 1.87m (Q) or at least best 12 qualified (q).

Rank	Athlete	Nation	Height	Notes
1	John Winter	Australia	1.87	Q
1	Bjørn Paulson	Norway	1.87	Q
1	George Stanich	United States	1.87	Q
1	Dwight Eddleman	United States	1.87	Q
1	Georges Damitio	France	1.87	Q
1	Art Jackes	Canada	1.87	Q
1	Alan Paterson	Great Britain	1.87	Q
1	Hans Wahli	Switzerland	1.87	Q
1	Alfredo Jadresic	Chile	1.87	Q
1	Göran Widenfelt	Sweden	1.87	Q
1	Pierre Lacaze	France	1.87	Q
1	Adegboyega Folaranmi Adedoyin	Great Britain	1.87	Q
1	Birger Leirud	Norway	1.87	Q
1	Hércules Azcune	Uruguay	1.87	Q
1	Lloyd Valberg	Singapore	1.87	Q
1	Vern McGrew	United States	1.87	Q
1	Kuuno Honkonen	Finland	1.87	Q
1	Gurnam Singh	India	1.87	Q
1	Bjørn Gundersen	Norway	1.87	Q
1	Nils Nicklén	Finland	1.87	Q
21	Arnulf Pilhatsch	Austria	1.84	
21	Benjamín Casado	Puerto Rico	1.84	
21	Claude Bénard	France	1.84	
21	Ioannis Lambrou	Greece	1.84	
21	Pedro Listur	Uruguay	1.84	
21	Arne Åhman	Sweden	1.84	
27	Ron Pavitt	Great Britain	1.80	
	Bill Bruce	Australia	DNS	
	Peter Mullins	Australia	DNS	
	Jorge Aguirre	Mexico	DNS	

=== Final ===
Rank	Athlete	Nation	1.80	1.87	1.90	1.95	1.98	Height
1st place, gold medalist(s)	John Winter	Australia	o	o	o	xo	o	1.98
2nd place, silver medalist(s)	Bjørn Paulson	Norway	o	o	o	o	xxx	1.95
3rd place, bronze medalist(s)	George Stanich	United States	o	o	o	xxo	xxx	1.95
4	Dwight Eddleman	United States	o	o	xo	xxo	xxx	1.95
5	Georges Damitio	France	o	o	xxo	xxo	xxx	1.95
6	Art Jackes	Canada	o	o	o	xxx	—N/a	1.90
7	Alan Paterson	Great Britain	o	xo	xo	xxx	—N/a	1.90
7	Hans Wahli	Switzerland	o	xo	xo	xxx	—N/a	1.90
9	Alfredo Jadresic	Chile	?	?	xxo	xxx	—N/a	1.90
9	Göran Widenfelt	Sweden	?	?	xxo	xxx	—N/a	1.90
9	Pierre Lacaze	France	?	?	xxo	xxx	—N/a	1.90
12	Adegboyega Folaranmi Adedoyin	Great Britain	?	?	xxo	xxx	—N/a	1.90
13	Birger Leirud	Norway	?	?	xxo	xxx	—N/a	1.90
14	Hércules Azcune	Uruguay	?	xxx	—N/a			1.80
14	Lloyd Valberg	Singapore	?	xxx	—N/a			1.80
16	Vern McGrew	United States	?	xxx	—N/a			1.80
17	Kuuno Honkonen	Finland	?	xxx	—N/a			1.80
18	Gurnam Singh	India	?	xxx	—N/a			1.80
—	Bjørn Gundersen	Norway	xxx	—N/a				No mark
—	Nils Nicklén	Finland	xxx	—N/a				No mark

== Sources ==
- Organising Committee for the XIV Olympiad, The (1948). The Official Report of the Organising Committee for the XIV Olympiad (PDF). LA84 Foundation. Archived from the original (PDF) on September 27, 2013.
