= Athletics at the 1950 British Empire Games – Men's high jump =

Men's high jump at the Commonwealth Games

The men's high jump event at the 1950 British Empire Games was held on 7 February at the Eden Park in Auckland, New Zealand.

== Results ==
Rank	Name	Nationality	Result	Notes
1st place, gold medalist(s)	John Winter	Australia	6 ft 6 in (1.98 m)	GR
2nd place, silver medalist(s)	Josiah Majekodunmi	Nigeria	6 ft 5 in (1.96 m)	
2nd place, silver medalist(s)	Alan Paterson	Scotland	6 ft 5 in (1.96 m)	
4	Johnny Borland	New Zealand	6 ft 5 in (1.96 m)	
5	Peter Wells	England	6 ft 4 in (1.93 m)	
6	Ron Pavitt	England	6 ft 3 in (1.91 m)	
7	John Vernon	Australia	6 ft 3 in (1.91 m)	
8	Douglas Stuart	Australia	6 ft 2 in (1.88 m)	
9	Mervyn Peter	Australia	6 ft 2 in (1.88 m)	
10	Art Jackes	Canada	6 ft 1 in (1.85 m)	
11	Ray McKenzie	New Zealand	6 ft 0 in (1.83 m)	
11	Christian de Jongh	South Africa	6 ft 0 in (1.83 m)	
11	Lloyd Valberg	Malaysia	6 ft 0 in (1.83 m)	
14	Orisi Dawai	Fiji	5 ft 9 in (1.75 m)	
14	Eric Rhodes	New Zealand	5 ft 9 in (1.75 m)	
14	Roy Woolley	New Zealand	5 ft 9 in (1.75 m)	
14	Boniface Goubadia	Nigeria	5 ft 9 in (1.75 m)	
	Ron Miller	Canada	?	
