= Maram Sudarmodjo =

Indonesian athlete and air force officer

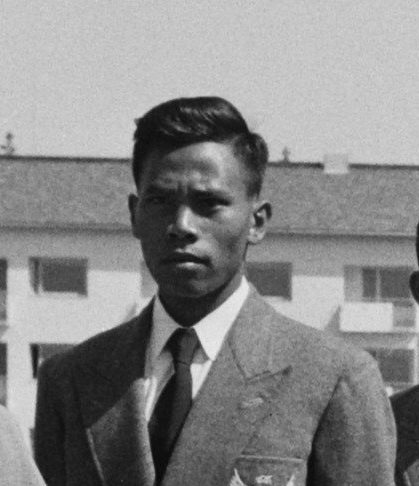
- Maram Sudarmodjo at the 1952 Olympics, Helsinki

Personal information
- Nationality: Indonesian
- Born: 25 January 1928 Gemolong, Sragen Regency, Dutch East Indies
- Died: 2006 (aged 77–78)

Sport
- Sport: Athletics
- Event: High jump
Medal record
Men's athletics
Representing Indonesia
Asian Games
Bronze medal – third place	1951 New Delhi	High jump

Maram Sudarmodjo (25 January 1928 – 2006) was an Indonesian athlete and air force officer. He represented Indonesia in the men's high jump at the 1952 Summer Olympics, ranking 20th in the final standing. Previously he won a gold medal at the 1948 National Sports Week—Indonesia's national multi-sport event—and a bronze medal at the 1951 Asian Games. He later joined the Indonesian Air Force, rising to the rank of lieutenant colonel before retiring.

== Biography ==
=== Early life ===
Maram Sudarmodjo was born in Gemolong, now in Sragen Regency, Central Java, Indonesia, on 25 January 1928. During the Indonesian War of Independence (1945), he served in the Indonesian Students' Army. As a youth, he did his high jump training in Sriwedari Stadium, Surakarta.

=== Athletic career ===
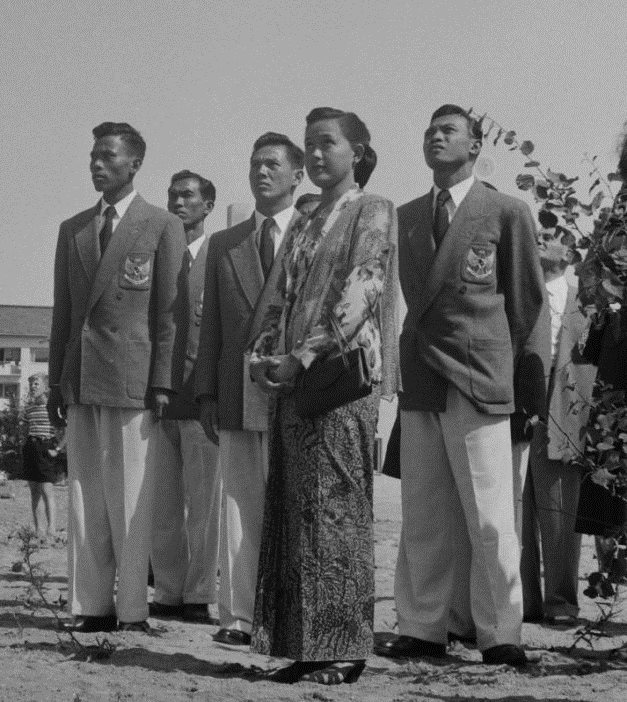
Sudarmodjo (left, midground) with the Indonesian 1952 Olympics team in Helsinki.

Sudarmodjo competed in Indonesia's first multi-sport Games, Pekan Olahraga Nasional ("National Sports Week") in Surakarta, 1948. He won gold medal and broke the national record by clearing a 1.89 m bar. He then became part of the Indonesian team at the 1951 Asian Games in New Delhi, India. He won a bronze medal, also with the best jump of 1.89 m. Due to these achievements, he was selected to join the Indonesian team at the 1952 Summer Olympics in Helsinki. This was the nation's first Olympics participation, and he would be one of the three Indonesians to compete, along with swimmer Habib Suharko and weightlifter Thio Ging Hwie.

The newly independent nation did not organize centralized training for its Olympics athletes. So before leaving for Helsinki, Sudarmodjo trained by himself in Ikada Stadium, Jakarta. Every day, he rode his bike to the stadium to train. He carried a hoe that he used to soften a patch of sand so that his landings would not hurt.

In the Olympics, he started in Group B of the qualifying round, where he cleared the 1.80 m, 1.84 m and 1.87 m bar, advancing to the final round. In the final round, he did not attempt the 1.70 m bar and cleared the 1.80 m one at first attempt. However, he did not clear the 1.90 m bar after three attempts. With these results, he ranked 20th overall.

=== Later life ===
Later, Sudarmodjo joined the Indonesian Air Force, raising to the rank of lieutenant colonel before retiring. He died in 2006 due to liver failure.

== Personal life ==
Sudarmodjo was married to RA Soekandini (b. 1930) and they had five children.
