= 1946 European Athletics Championships – Men's high jump =

Men's high jump at the European Athletics Championships

The men's high jump at the 1946 European Athletics Championships was held in Oslo, Norway, at Bislett Stadium on 23 August 1946.

== Medalists ==
Gold	Anton Bolinder; Sweden
Silver	Alan Paterson; Great Britain
Bronze	Nils Nicklén; Finland

== Results ==
=== Final ===
23 August

Rank	Name	Nationality	Result	Notes
1st place, gold medalist(s)	Anton Bolinder	Sweden	1.99	
2nd place, silver medalist(s)	Alan Paterson	Great Britain	1.96	
3rd place, bronze medalist(s)	Nils Nicklén	Finland	1.93	
4	Birger Leirud	Norway	1.93	
5	Gunnar Lindecrantz	Sweden	1.93	
6	Alfredo Campagner	Italy	1.90	
7	Skúli Guðmundsson	Iceland	1.90	
8	Georges Audouy	France	1.90	
9	Ivar Vind	Denmark	1.90	
10	Ioannis Lambrou	Greece	1.85	
10	Alexander Yggeseth	Norway	1.85	
12	Petar Vukovic	Yugoslavia	1.85	
13	Václav Hausenblas	Czechoslovakia	1.80	
14	Vladimir Žila	Czechoslovakia	1.80	
15	Hans Wahli	Switzerland	1.80	

== Participation ==
According to an unofficial count, 15 athletes from 12 countries participated in the event.

- Czechoslovakia (2)
- Denmark (1)
- Finland (1)
- France (1)
- Greece (1)
- Iceland (1)
- Italy (1)
- Norway (2)
- Sweden (2)
- Switzerland (1)
- Great Britain (1)
- Yugoslavia (1)
