= Peter Wells (athlete) =

English athlete

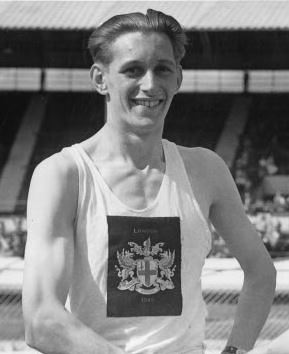

Personal information
- Full name: Peter Wells
- Nationality: English, New Zealand
- Born: 23 May 1929 Friern Barnet, Middlesex, England
- Died: 5 January 2018 (aged 88) Christchurch, New Zealand
- Education: Byng Road Council School, Queen Elizabeth's School, Barnet
- Height: 1.82 m (5 ft 11 1/2 in)
- Website: www.peterwells.co.nz

Sport
- Country: (United Kingdom) Great Britain; England; New Zealand
- Sport: Athletics
- Event: High Jump
- Coached by: Arthur Gold

Achievements and titles
- Olympic finals: 1952 Summer Olympics 1956 Summer Olympics
- Commonwealth finals: 1950 British Empire Games 1954 British Empire and Commonwealth Games
- Personal best: 2.02 m (6 ft 7 1/2 in)

Peter Wells (23 May 1929 – 5 January 2018) was a British-born athlete who competed in the High Jump at the 1952 and 1956 Summer Olympics.

He also represented England at the 1950 Empire Games in Auckland, and New Zealand at the 1954 Commonwealth Games in Vancouver. After the 1950 Empire Games in Auckland, Wells didn't travel back to England with the rest of the team, preferring to stay and settle in Christchurch, New Zealand. He lived in New Zealand for the rest of his life, apart from a short period in 1952 when he returned to England in order to qualify for the 1952 Summer Olympics. He died in Christchurch on 5 January 2018 after a short illness.

== Early life and education ==
Wells was born at Friern Barnet in North London, the youngest child of Cecil Edward Wells and Ethel Alice Wells (née Cannon). He lived initially in Finchley before moving at the age of two to High Barnet. He attended Byng Road Council School, (now called Foulds School), and then went to Queen Elizabeth's Grammar School in 1939.

== English competition highlights ==
Date	Height	Place	Achievement	
1947 - April 19	6 ft 0 in (1.83 m)	1st	First English schoolboy to clear 6 ft 0 in (1.83 m)	Motspur Park, London
1947 - August 9	6 ft 0 in (1.83 m)	1st	AAA Junior Championships	Fallowfield, Manchester
1947 - August 16	6 ft 0 in (1.83 m)	3rd	BAAB v Combined Services	White City, London
1949 - August 6	6 ft 5 1/4 in (1.962 m)		English Native Record	London
1949 - August 20	6 ft 6 1/4 in (1.988 m)		English Native Record	Bristol
1949 - September 4	6 ft 4 in (1.93 m)		Inter-Services Champion	Bourdeaux
1952 - May 17	6 ft 5 in (1.96 m)		Herts Champion	New Southgate

== First English schoolboy to clear 6 ft – 1947 ==
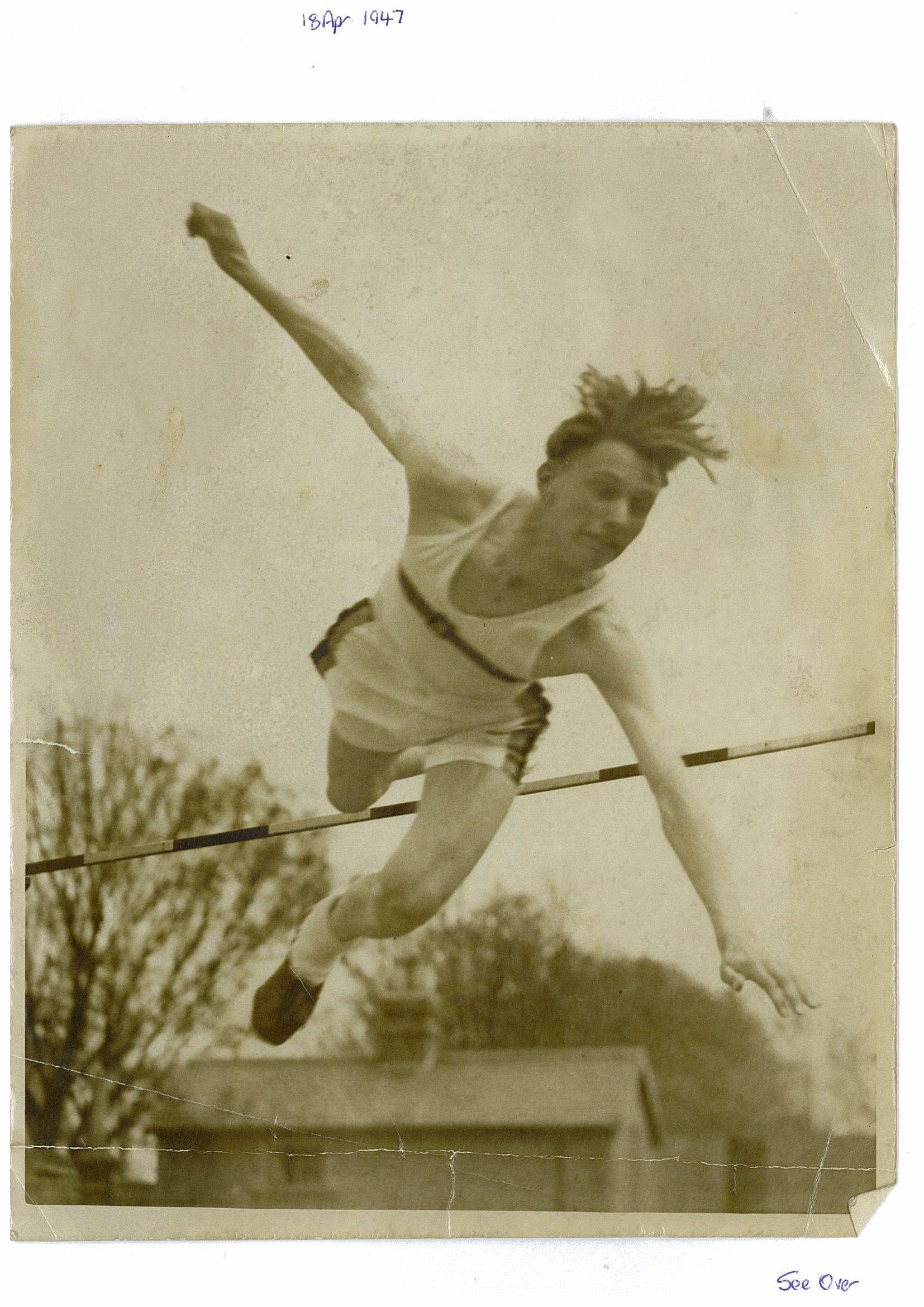
Wells, of Queen Elizabeth's School, becoming the first English schoolboy to clear 6 ft 0 in (1.83 m)

Wells first big meeting was the Public Schools’ championships of 1946 held on the University of London track at Motspur Park in Surrey, in which he came 3rd with 5 ft 6 in (1.68 m). Queen Elizabeth's School won the Public Schools Challenge Cup.

On 18 April 1947, the meeting was again at Motspur Park, and this time Wells won the high jump title, in the process becoming the first English schoolboy to clear 6 ft 0 in (1.83 m), beating the previous best of 5 ft 10 1/2 in (1.79 m) set by H.A.Simmons (Taunton's, Southampton) in 1928. Queen Elizabeth's School again won the challenge cup, and as athletics captain Wells had the responsibility of collecting it, plus the high jump cup, in a ceremony at the conclusion of the two-day meeting.

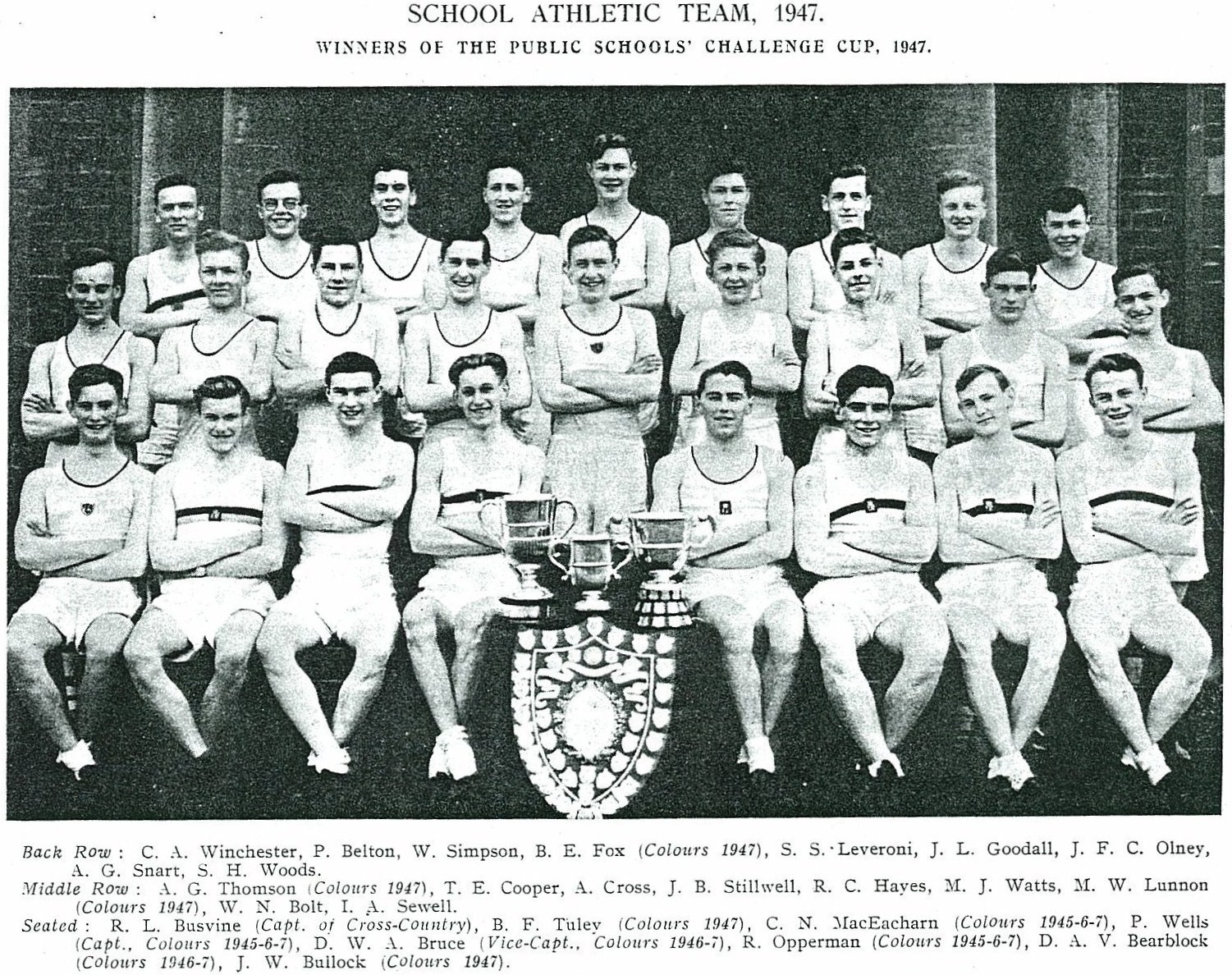
Queen Elizabeth's School athletics team, 1947

== English native high jump record – 1949 ==
"English Native Records" were defined by the AAA in 1928 as performances made in England or Wales by athletes born in England or Wales. This was superseded in 1960 by "AAA National Records" – performances made in England or Wales by athletes born in England or Wales, or by bona fide members of clubs under the jurisdiction of the AAA whose fathers were born in England or Wales.

=== 6 ft 6 in - 6 August 1949, London ===
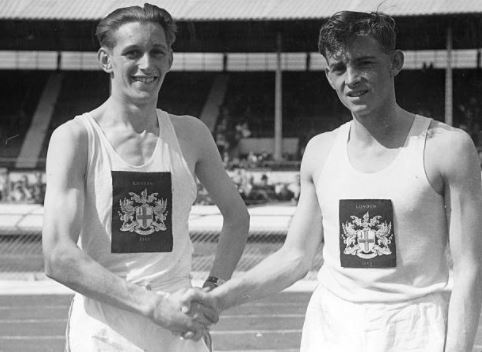
Wells (left) congratulating Ron Pavitt after both jumpers beat the English native high jump record

On 6 August 1949, high jumpers Wells (20 years old) and Ron Pavitt represented London in an inter-city athletics match against 2 athletes from Gothenburg at White City Stadium, London.

Usually Wells would start jumping at 5 ft 8 in (1.73 m), and increase this by 0 ft 2 in (5 cm) after each successful jump. This day the Swedes had to jump first and they passed in at 5 ft 8 in (1.73 m), and then also at 5 ft 10 in (1.78 m). Wells and Pavitt also passed in at 5 ft 8 in (1.73 m) and 5 ft 10 in (1.78 m), so for the first (and only) time in his career Wells started jumping at 6 ft 0 in (1.83 m). He and Pavitt succeeded at 6 ft 0 in (1.83 m), then 6 ft 2 in (1.88 m), then to 6 ft 4 in (1.93 m). By this time the Swedish athletes had dropped out. Wells then succeeded at 6 ft 5 1/4 in (1.96 m), at his first attempt, to beat the previous English Native high jump record of 6 ft 5 in (1.96 m) held by Benjamin Howard Baker. Pavitt also succeeded at 6 ft 5 1/4 in (1.96 m) to equal the record. At 6 ft 6 in (1.98 m) Pavitt beat the record again, which Wells was unable to match.

So in the course of about 5 minutes, Wells broke the English Native high jump record, then shared it with Pavitt, and then lost it to Pavitt.

Wells and Pavitt maintained a close and friendly rivalry for several years, and were referred to as "The Heavenly Twins".

=== Record jump 20 August 1949, Bristol ===
Two weeks later, Wells and Pavitt competed for the Southern Counties in an inter-area match at St. George Grammar School playing fields at Whitehall, Bristol. Jumping off his preferred grass take-off area, Wells re-took the English Native high jump record with a jump of 6 ft 6 3/8 in (1.991 m). This jump was higher than the gold medal jump at the 1948 Summer Olympics in London the previous year. This record was not beaten until 30 April 1959, when the Hermes Club jumper, G.A.Miller, against Oxford University, cleared 6 ft 7 1/4 in (2.01 m) .

== British high jump record ==
On 11 December 1954, in Christchurch, New Zealand, Wells recorded the highest jump of his career with 6 ft 7 1/2 in (2.02 m). This equalled the British high jump record set by Alan Paterson on 2 August 1947. They remained joint British record holders until 1 August 1959 when Crawford Fairbrother cleared 6 ft 8 in (2.03 m).

== Olympic and Commonwealth Games participation ==
Year	Event	Host city	Representing	Jump	Rank
1950	British Empire Games	Auckland, New Zealand	England	1.93 m (6 ft 4 in)	5
1952	Olympic Games	Helsinki, Finland	(United Kingdom) Great Britain	1.90 m (6 ft 3 in)	11
1954	British Empire and Commonwealth Games	Vancouver, Canada	New Zealand	1.95 m (6 ft 5 in)	4
1956	Olympic Games	Melbourne, Australia	(United Kingdom) Great Britain	1.96 m (6 ft 5 in)	16

=== 1950 British Empire Games ===
In September 1949, the Amateur Athletic Association announced the names of the athletes invited to represent England in the track and field events of the British Empire Games in Auckland the following February. Both Wells and Pavitt were selected.

The games ran between 4 and 11 February 1950. Coming from an English winter with no available indoor training facilities, and then five weeks on a boat journey to New Zealand was not ideal preparation for Wells. He twisted his ankle on the boat jumping over a net, which set back his training.

The high jump was held on the first day of competition. The gold medal was won by John Winter from Australia, with a leap of 6 ft 6 in (1.98 m). Wells finished fifth, with a best jump of 6 ft 4 in (1.93 m).

=== 1952 Summer Olympics ===
Wells represented Great Britain in the high jump at the 1952 Helsinki Olympics. He made it through the qualifying round, jumping 1.87 m (6 ft 2 in). In the finals, Wells had successful first jumps at 1.70 m (5 ft 7 in), 1.80 m (5 ft 11 in) and 1.90 m (6 ft 3 in), but failed on his three attempts at 1.95 m (6 ft 5 in), finishing 11th equal out of 28 competitors.

=== 1954 British Empire and Commonwealth Games ===
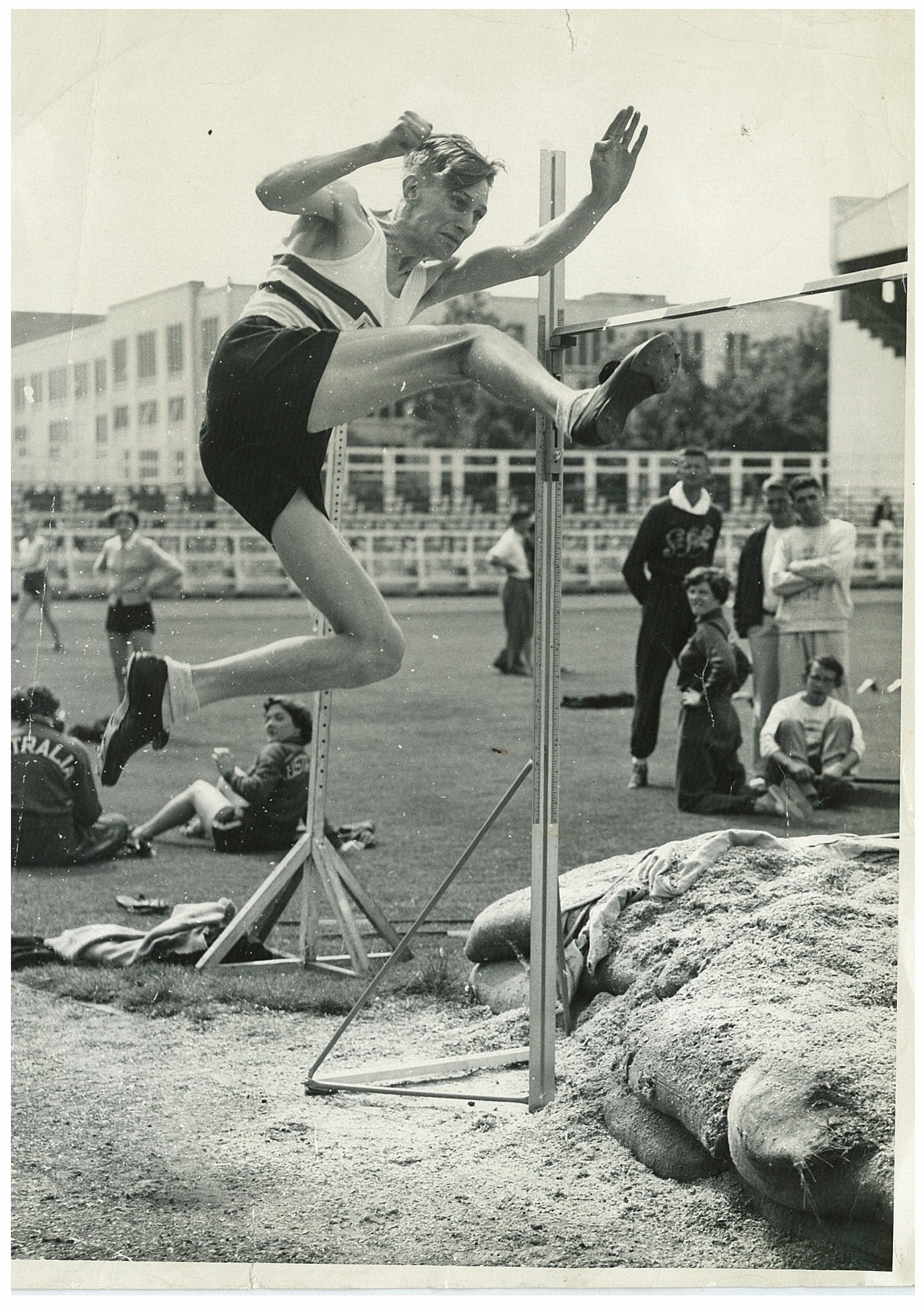
Wells practising at Vancouver, 1954

In July 1954, Wells represented New Zealand for the first time, at the 1954 British Empire and Commonwealth Games in Vancouver. He finished fourth, with a height of 6 ft 5 in (1.96 m), behind the gold medallist, Emmanuel Ifeajuna of Nigeria, who set a new Games record and British Empire record of 6 ft 8 in (2.03 m). Wells holding second place until overtaken by two opponents who cleared 6 ft 6 1/4 in (1.988 m) (1.99m) with their third and final jumps.

=== 1956 Summer Olympics ===
Olympic eligibility rules meant having already represented Great Britain at the Olympics in Helsinki in 1952, Wells was ineligible to switch his allegiance to New Zealand for the Melbourne Olympics in 1956, even though he had been living in New Zealand for six years. This differed from the eligibility rules for the Empire Games. Wells' good form in domestic competitions in New Zealand during 1956 had not escaped the notice of the Great Britain selectors, and he was duly included in the Great Britain team for the 1956 Summer Olympics in Melbourne.

Wells travelled with the New Zealand team to Melbourne, joined up with the Great Britain team on arrival, and travelled back to New Zealand with the New Zealand team at the conclusion of the Games. Later in the Games, when many of the British athletes had left the village, Wells switched camps and moved in with the New Zealand team.

In the men's high jump competition, Wells, progressed through the qualifying rounds, clearing 1.92 m (6 ft 4 in). In the final round, he cleared 1.80 m (5 ft 11 in) and 1.86 m (6 ft 1 in) on his first attempts, and 1.92 m (6 ft 4 in) and 1.96 m (6 ft 5 in) on his second attempts. However, he failed in all three attempts at 1.96 m (6 ft 5 in), finishing in 16th place.

== New Zealand high jump career ==
=== National records ===
On 23 January 1954, Wells broke the New Zealand high jump record at Rugby Park in Christchurch with a jump of 6 ft 6 1/4 in (1.99 m).

On 11 December 1954, Wells again broke the New Zealand high jump record at Papakura, Auckland, with a jump of 6 ft 7 1/2 in (2.02 m). This was to be the highest jump of his career, which equalled the British high jump record set by Alan Paterson on 2 August 1947.

It was 14 years before the New Zealand record was broken by William R. (Bill) Speirs on 1 March 1969, with a leap of 6 ft 8 in (2.03 m). A year earlier, on 13 January 1968, Arthur W Jordan of Auckland had cleared 6 ft 7 3/4 in (2.03 m), but was unable to claim the record because of a technical mistake.

=== National champion ===
Wells was New Zealand national high jump champion seven times, starting with the 1950–1951 season. He did not defend his title the next season, instead returning to England in a successful attempt to represent Great Britain at the 1952 Olympics in Helsinki, but then had a straight run of six titles from the 1952–1953 season, through to the 1957–1958 season.

Season	Position	Height	Venue	Representing
1950–51	1st	6 ft 4 in (1.93 m)	Wellington	Canterbury
1951–52	Did not defend title			
1952–53	1st	6 ft 3 in (1.91 m)	Dunedin	Canterbury
1953–54	1st	6 ft 1 in (1.85 m)	Hamilton	Canterbury
1954–55	1st	6 ft 5 in (1.96 m)	Auckland	Auckland
1955–56	1st	6 ft 7 in (2.01 m)	Christchurch	Canterbury
1956–57	1st	6 ft 1 in (1.85 m)	Napier	Canterbury
1957–58	1st	6 ft 5 in (1.96 m)	Lower Hutt	Canterbury

== Jumping technique – the Western roll ==
Wells used the Western roll jumping technique.

Peter Heidenstrom, athletics commentator and historian, described Wells' Western roll as "finely controlled, precise, a beautiful thing to watch".
