= Alan Paterson =

British high jumper (1928–1999)

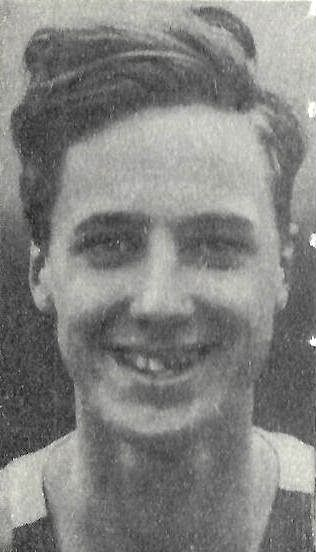
- Paterson in 1945, aged 17

Personal information
- Born: 11 June 1928 Glasgow, Scotland
- Died: 8 May 1999 (aged 70) Port Credit, Ontario, Canada
- Years active: 1944–1952

Sport
- Sport: Track and field
- Event: High jump
Medal record
Men's athletics
Representing Great Britain
European Championships
Gold medal – first place	1950 Brussels	High jump
Silver medal – second place	1946 Oslo	High jump
Representing Scotland
British Empire Games
Silver medal – second place	1950 Auckland	High jump

Alan Sinclair Paterson (11 June 1928 – 8 May 1999) was a British track and field athlete who competed in the high jump. He was one of Europe's best high jumpers during the immediate post-World War II period. He was the champion at the European Athletics Championships in 1950 and was also silver medallist at the 1946 event. He won a silver medal for Scotland at the 1950 British Empire Games.

He was a two-time Olympic finalist in the event, having competed at the 1948 London Olympics and the 1952 Helsinki Olympics. His personal best of 2.02 m (6 ft 7 1/2 in) was a British record at the time and he was a three-time champion at the AAA Championships.

== Biography ==
Born in Glasgow, he rose to the top of the national scene by winning the 1946 Amateur Athletic Association junior title in 1.89 m (6 ft 2 1/4 in) before taking the senior title at the 1946 AAA Championships. He was chosen to represent Great Britain at the 1946 European Athletics Championships in August and claimed the silver medal after a personal best jump of 1.96 m (6 ft 5 in), finishing behind Sweden's Anton Bolinder. This made the 18-year-old Paterson the youngest ever medallist at the championships.

Adegboyega Adedoyin was the winner at the national championships in 1947, but Paterson set a British record in Glasgow that year with a clearance of 2.02 m (6 ft 7 1/2 in) – a mark that ranked him third in the world that season and was the best of his career. Paterson was again beaten by a foreigner at the 1948 AAA championships, this time by Australian John Winter. He contested Winter again at the 1948 Summer Olympics in London and the Australian came out on top with the gold medal while Paterson was the home nation's best performer in seventh place with 1.90 m (6 ft 2 3/4 in). With eight other jumpers achieving the same height, his placing was decided on count-back – the first time the rule, which takes into account previous missed heights, was used in Olympic competition.

He won his second and third AAA national titles in 1949 and 1950. He reached the top of the continental scene at the 1950 European Athletics Championships, going one better than his previous outing to take the gold medal with a clearance of 1.96 m (6 ft 5 in). He prevented runner-up Arne Åhman from extending Sweden's unbeaten run since 1938 and was the first non-Scandinavian to lift the title. That same year he represented his native Scotland at the 1950 British Empire Games. His Olympic rival John Winter was present and victorious, but Paterson's jump of 1.95 m (6 ft 4 3/4 in) brought him a share of the silver medal alongside Nigeria's Joshua Majekodunmi (his first and only international medal for Scotland).

Paterson emigrated to Canada in 1951 and ceased national competition as a result. His final international appearance came at the 1952 Helsinki Olympics at the age of twenty four. He was no longer competitive among the elite at that event and failed to clear 1.90 m (6 ft 2 3/4 in), ending his Olympic career with 24th-place finish. Following retirement from athletics, Paterson remained in Canada and died there at the age of seventy in Port Credit, Ontario.

== International competitions ==
Year	Competition	Venue	Position	Notes
1946	European Championships	Oslo, Norway	2nd	High jump
1948	Olympic Games	London United Kingdom	7th	High jump
1950	European Championships	Brussels, Belgium	1st	High jump
1950	British Empire Games	Auckland, New Zealand	2nd	High jump
1952	Olympic Games	Helsinki, Finland	24th	High jump

== See also ==
- List of European Athletics Championships medalists (men)
