= Nafiu Osagie =

Nigerian high jumper (1928–2019)

Personal information
- Nationality: Nigerian
- Born: 6 April 1928 Benin City, British Nigeria
- Died: 18 February 2019 (aged 90)
- Height: 174 cm (5 ft 9 in)
- Weight: 64 kg (141 lb)

Sport
- Sport: Athletics
- Event: High jump

Nafiu Belo Osagie (1 April 1933 – 18 February 2019) was a Nigerian athlete. He competed in the men's high jump at the 1952 Summer Olympics.

Osagie finished third behind Ron Pavitt in the high jump event at the British 1952 AAA Championships.
