= Indonesia at the 1952 Summer Olympics =

- IOC code: INA
- NOC: Indonesian Olympic Committee

in Helsinki
- Competitors: 3 in 3 sports
- Flag bearer: Habib Suharko
- Medals: Gold 0 Silver 0 Bronze 0 Total 0

Summer Olympics appearances (overview)
- 1952; 1956; 1960; 1964; 1968; 1972; 1976; 1980; 1984; 1988; 1992; 1996; 2000; 2004; 2008; 2012; 2016; 2020; 2024

Other related appearances
- Individual Olympic Athletes (2000); Timor-Leste (2004–pres.)

Indonesia competed in the Summer Olympic Games for the first time at the 1952 Summer Olympics in Helsinki, Finland. With three male athletes, Indonesia was one of the smallest teams competing in Helsinki. The team did not win any medals. The weightlifter Thio Ging Hwie ranked eighth overall in men's lightweight, Maram Sudarmodjo ranked 20th in men's high jump, and the swimmer Habib Suharko did not advance past the preliminary round. Suharko served as flag bearer for the Indonesian delegation at the opening ceremony.

== Background ==
The Republic of Indonesia declared its independence in 1945; previously it was a Dutch colony known as the Dutch East Indies. In 1946, the newly independent nation created its National Olympic Committee, Sports Association of the Republic of Indonesia (Persatuan Olahraga Republik Indonesia or PORI) and began organizing its national multi-sports event—National Sports Week—in 1948 in Surakarta. The nation unsuccessfully attempted to join the 1948 Summer Olympics in London amid the Indonesian War of Independence (1945–1949). In 1951 Indonesia competed in the first-ever Asian Games in New Delhi, India. In 1952 the committee, now renamed the Indonesian Olympic Committee (Komite Olimpiade Indonesia or KOI) was recognized by the International Olympic Committee (IOC) and Indonesia was set to debut in the Olympics that year in Helsinki.

== Competitors ==
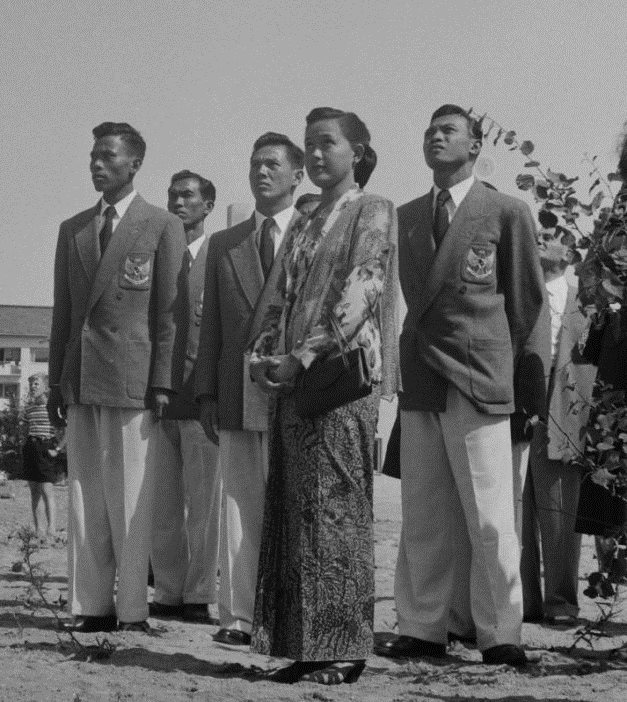
The Indonesian team in Helsinki. The three athletes are in midground.

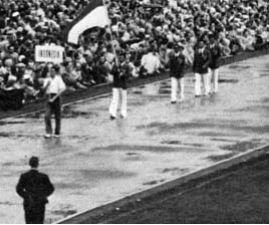
The Indonesian team at the opening ceremony. Suharko as the flag bearer was followed by chef de mission Abdulazis Saleh, Thio, and Sudarmodjo.

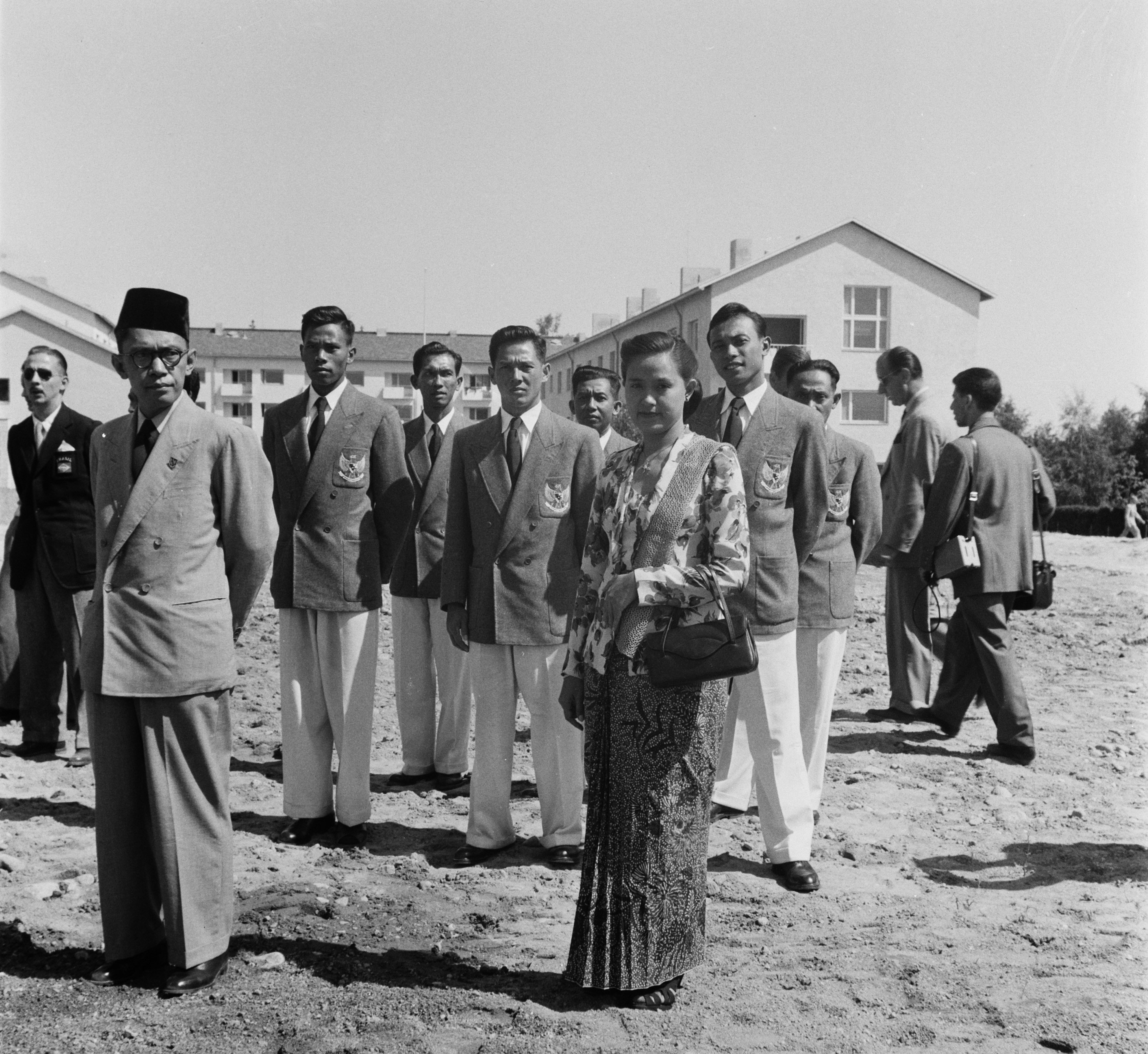
The team and officials

The Indonesian team consisted of three male athletes: high jump athlete Maram Sudarmodjo, swimmer Habib Suharko and weightlifter Thio Ging Hwie. They were selected from participants of the 1948 National Sports Week and the 1951 Asian Games. Maram Sudarmodjo was a former youth fighter in the War of Independence and a future lieutenant colonel in the country's air force. Previously he won a gold medal in the 1948 National Sports Week and a bronze medal in the 1951 Asian Games, both with the best jump of 1.89 m. Thio Ging Hwie was the first ethnic Chinese Indonesian to participate in an international sports event. Two officials and one spectator was registered as part of the delegation, and six press passes were issued for the country. With just three athletes, it was one of the smallest teams in 1952, bigger than China, Guyana, Panama (one athlete each) as well as Trinidad & Tobago and Liechtenstein (two each).

The following is the list of number of competitors participating in the Games:

Sport	Men	Women	Total
Athletics	1	0	1
Swimming	1	0	1
Weightlifting	1	0	1
Total	3	0	3

== Athletics ==
The 24-year-old Maram Sudarmodjo was Indonesia's sole athlete in athletics, participating in men's high jump. In the qualifying round he was drawn in Group B, where he cleared the 1.80 m, 1.84 m and 1.87 m bar. This put him at the 14th position in the group and 26th overall, allowing him to advance to the final round. In the final round, he did not attempt the 1.70 m bar and cleared the 1.80 m one at his first attempt. However, he did not clear the 1.90 m bar after three attempts. With these results, he ranked 20th overall. The gold medal was won by Buddy Davis of the United States, with the best jump of 2.04 m.

Athlete	Event	Qualification		Final		Source
Athlete	Event	Distance	Position	Distance	Position	Source
Maram Sudarmodjo	High jump	1.87	=26	1.80	=20	

== Swimming ==
The sole Indonesian swimmer, Habib Suharko, participated in men's 200 m breaststroke. In the preliminary round, he swam a time of 2 minutes and 51.3 seconds, finishing fifth in heat five, and did not qualify for the next round.

Athlete	Event	Heat			Source
Athlete	Event	Time	Rank	Note	Source
Habib Suharko	Men's 200 m breaststroke	2:51.3	5 (heat 5)	Did not advance	

== Weightlifting ==
The weightlifter Thio Ging Hwie participated in men's lightweight. He completed three military presses: 97.5 kilograms, 102.5 kilograms and 105.0 kilograms. The 105.0 kilogram lift was the best military press in the competition, tied with five other athletes. In snatches, he successfully opened with 87.5 kilograms, then failed his second lift (92.5 kilograms) before completing the same weight in his final lift. In clean and jerks, he successfully lifted 120.0 kilograms, 125.0 kilograms and 130 kilograms. His best completed lifts from each variant totaled 327.5 kilograms, ranking him eighth in the final standings. The gold medal was won by Tommy Kono of the United States, with lifts totaling 362.5 kilograms.

Athlete	Event	Military press		Snatch		Clean & Jerk		Total	Rank	Source
Athlete	Event	Result	Rank	Result	Rank	Result	Rank	Total	Rank	Source
Thio Ging Hwie	Men's Lightweight	105	=1	92.5	=18	130	=6	327.5	8	

== See also ==
- Indonesia at the Olympics
- Indonesia at the Paralympics
