= Pekka Halme =

Finnish high jumper (1927–2018)

Personal information
- Nationality: Finnish
- Born: 5 March 1927 Maaria, Finland
- Died: 10 January 2018 (aged 90)

Sport
- Sport: Athletics
- Event: High jump

Pekka Olavi Halme (5 March 1927 – 10 January 2018) was a Finnish athlete. He competed in the men's high jump at the 1952 Summer Olympics.
