= Gurnam Singh (high jumper) =

Indian high jumper (born 1917)

Personal information
- Nationality: Indian
- Born: 1917

Sport
- Sport: Athletics
- Event: High jump

Gurnam Singh (born 1917, date of death unknown) was an Indian athlete. He competed in the men's high jump at the 1948 Summer Olympics. Singh is deceased.
