= Ragnvald Paulson =

Norwegian book publisher and politician (1858–1926)

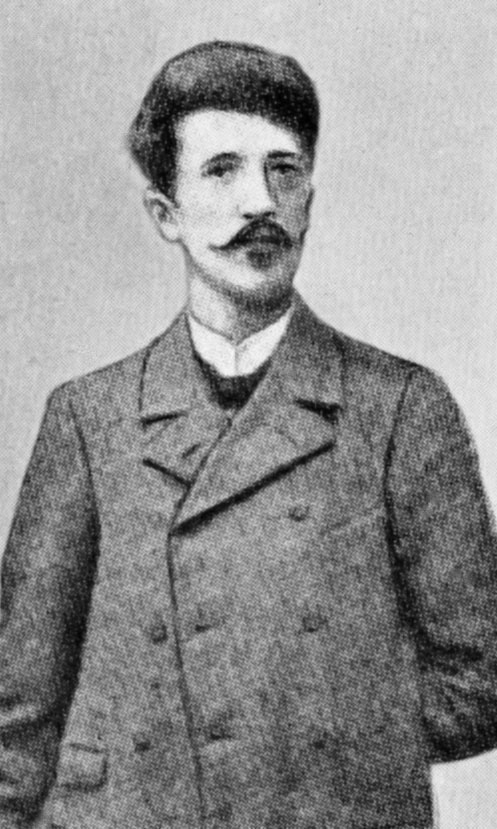

Paul Ragnvald Paulson (1858–1926) was a Norwegian book publisher and politician for the Labour Party.

== Biography ==
He hailed from Bergen. He was the son of politician Olav Paulssøn (1822–1896) and Anna Kristine Christofa Hagerup (1824–1917) and was an older brother of Andreas Paulson. The family had moved to Bergen from Jølster Municipality in 1860, as the father was offered a job there.

He started an antiquarian bookshop in Bergen in 1884, and later expanded with a publishing house. The publishing house perished in the Bergen fire of 1916. Paulson also translated socialist literature, including Peter Kropotkin, Robert Blatchford and other Fabians. He was a member of Bergen city council, and had influence in the nationwide party around 1905–1906. He died in late 1926.
