= Finn Ludt =

Norwegian pianist, composer and music critic

- Born: 16 November 1918; Fana, Norway
- Died: 3 August 1992 (aged 73)
- Occupations: Pianist, composer and music critic
- Relatives: Andreas Paulson (grandfather)
- Awards: Norwegian Music Critics Award (1973)

Finn Ludt (16 November 1918 – 3 August 1992) was a Norwegian pianist, composer and music critic. He was born in Fana. He made his concert debut in Bergen in 1945. He composed several songs, including "Blåklokkevikua", "Blåbærturen" and "Lillebrors vise" with text by Alf Prøysen, "Vårherres klinkekule" and "Hildringstimen" by Erik Bye, "Berre" by Arnljot Eggen and "Vandringsvise" by Einar Skjæraasen. He composed ballets and stage music, working for Det Norske Teatret and Radioteatret. He was a music critic for Morgenbladet from 1946.
