= Ioan Soter =

Romanian high jumper

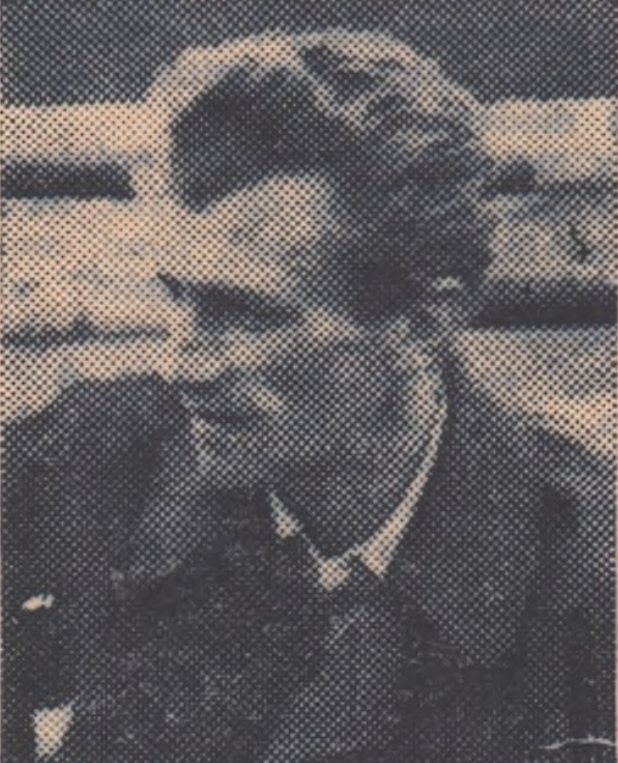
- Sportul popular, 1956

Personal information
- Nationality: Romanian
- Born: 16 May 1927
- Died: 26 September 1987 (aged 60)

Sport
- Sport: Athletics
- Event: High jump

Ioan Soter (Hungarian: Sőtér János, 16 May 1927 – 26 September 1987) was a Romanian high jumper. He competed in the men's high jump at the 1952 Summer Olympics. He coached Romanian Olympic champion Iolanda Balaș, and married her after her retirement in 1967.
