= Walter Herssens =

Belgian decathlete

Personal information
- Nationality: Belgian
- Born: 15 February 1930 Bruges, Belgium
- Died: 14 January 1992 (aged 61)

Sport
- Sport: Athletics
- Event: Decathlon/High jump/triple jump
- Club: Olympic Brugge/ RESC, Laeken

Walter Herssens (15 February 1930 – 14 January 1992) was a Belgian decathlete who competed at the 1952 Summer Olympics and the 1956 Summer Olympics.

== Biography ==
Herssens finished third behind Ron Pavitt in the high jump event at the 1951 AAA Championships.

Herssens represented the Belgium at the 1952 Olympic Games in Helsinki, where he competed in the men's high jump and triple jump events, finishing in 29th and 33rd respectively.

He returned four years later to the 1956 Olympic Games in Melbourne, where he competed in the triple jump finishing 29th and pulling out of the decathlon.
