= Rosine Faugouin =

French sprinter (1930–2018)

Personal information
- Nationality: French
- Born: 11 June 1930 Paris, France
- Died: 19 May 2018 (aged 87) Orléans, France
- Spouse: Claude Bénard

Sport
- Sport: Sprinting
- Event: 200 metres

Rosine Faugouin (11 June 1930 – 19 May 2018) was a French sprinter. She competed in the women's 200 metres at the 1948 Summer Olympics.

A native of Paris, in her later years Faugouin lived in Orléans with her husband Claude Bénard (1926–2025), also a former athlete; she died there in 2018.
