= Boniface Guobadia =

Nigerian high jumper

Personal information
- Nationality: Nigerian
- Born: 10 November 1926

Sport
- Sport: Athletics
- Event: High jump

Boniface Aggrey Agbonfo Guobadia (born 10 November 1926) was a Nigerian athlete. He competed in the men's high jump at the 1952 Summer Olympics.
