= Jacques Delelienne =

Belgian high jumper (1928–2020)

Personal information
- Nationality: Belgian
- Born: 25 November 1928 Schaerbeek, Belgium
- Died: 3 February 2020 (aged 91) Uccle, Belgium

Sport
- Sport: Athletics
- Event: High jump
- Club: Royal Racing Club de Bruxelles

Jacques Delelienne (25 November 1928 – 3 February 2020) was a Belgian athlete who competed at the 1952 Summer Olympics.

== Biography ==
Delelienne finished second behind Ron Pavitt in the high jump event at the 1951 AAA Championships.

Delelienne represented the Belgium at the 1952 Olympic Games in Helsinki, where he competed in the men's high jump.
