= Albert Koskinen =

Finnish high jumper

- Koskinen at the 1952 Summer Olympics

Personal information
- Nationality: Finnish
- Born: 29 October 1925 Nokia, Finland
- Died: 23 December 2004 (aged 79) Nokia, Finland

Sport
- Sport: Athletics
- Event: High jump

Albert Gunnar Koskinen (29 October 1925 – 23 December 2004) was a Finnish athlete. He competed in the men's high jump at the 1952 Summer Olympics.
