= Yevhen Vansovych =

Ukrainian high jumper (1930–2017)

Yevgeny Antonovich Vansovich
Personal information
- Nationality: Ukrainian
- Born: 17 December 1930 Odesa, USSR
- Died: 22 June 2017 (aged 86) Odesa, Ukraine

Sport
- Sport: Athletics
- Event: High jump

Yevgeny Vansovych (17 December 1930 – 22 June 2017) was a Ukrainian athlete. He competed in the men's high jump at the 1952 Summer Olympics, representing the Soviet Union.
