= Olav Paulssøn =

Norwegian politician

Olav Paulssøn (1822–1896) was a Norwegian bailiff, writer and politician.

== Career ==
He served as a deputy representative to the Norwegian Parliament in 1859, representing the constituency of Nordre Bergenhus Amt. He lived in Jølster at the time, where he was bailiff from 1855 to 1860. In 1860 he was hired as CEO of Fylkesbaatane, and had to move to Bergen. Here, he was among the founders of Vestmannalaget in 1868. Led by Henrik Krohn, Vestmannalaget was a Landsmål association for Western Norway, and Paulssøn helped publish texts in this written form of the Norwegian language. He was also a member of Bergen city council.

== Personal life ==
He was married to Anna Kristine Christofa Hagerup (1824–1917), and was the father of writer Andreas Paulson and bookseller and publisher Ragnvald Paulson.
