= Bjørn Paulson =

Norwegian high jumper and jurist

Olympic medal record

Men's athletics

Representing Norway
Silver medal – second place	1948 London	High jump

Bjørn Andreas Paulson (21 June 1923 – 14 January 2008) was a Norwegian high jumper and jurist.

He was a grandson of Andreas Paulson. He was born in Bergen, but represented the club IL Skjalg. At the 1948 Summer Olympics held in London he finished second in the high jump final with a jump of 1.95 metres. He became Norwegian champion in 1948. His personal best jump was 1.96 metres, achieved at the Norwegian championships in August 1948 in Trondheim.

A cand.jur. by education, Paulson became a police superintendent in 1953. From 1967 to 1993 he worked as a public prosecutor. He died in 2008.
