= Nils Nicklén =

Finnish high jumper (1917–1995)

Medal record

Men's athletics

Representing Finland

European Championships
Bronze medal – third place	1946 Oslo	High jump

Nils Ole Nicklén (9 February 1917 – 9 May 1995) was a Finnish high jumper.

He was born in Karis and represented a club in Helsinki, where he also died. He is best known for winning the bronze medal at the 1946 European Championships. At the 1948 Olympic Games he no-heighted in the final. His personal best jump was 2.00 metres, achieved in 1939.
