= Arnold Betton =

American high jumper

Arnold Lee "Arnie" Betton (July 28, 1929 – November 19, 2009) was an American track and field athlete, known primarily for the high jump. He was an American competitor at the 1952 Olympics, where he finished in seventh position. In the qualifying round, he had been tied as the leading qualifier. While jumping for Drake University, he had a personal best of 2.05 m (6 ft 8 1/2 in), set the previous year. 2.05 was better than the winning jump of the Olympics by Walt Davis. In 1951 he was ranked #6 in the world. In 1952, he was ranked 7th, same as his place in the Olympics.
