= James Owoo =

Ghanaian high jumper

James Tettey Owoo
Personal information
- Nationality: Ghanaian
- Born: 16 December 1927

Sport
- Sport: Athletics
- Event: High jump

James Owoo (born 16 December 1927) was a Ghanaian athlete. He competed in the men's high jump at the 1952 Summer Olympics.
