= Andreas Paulson =

Norwegian bank accountant and literary and theatre critic

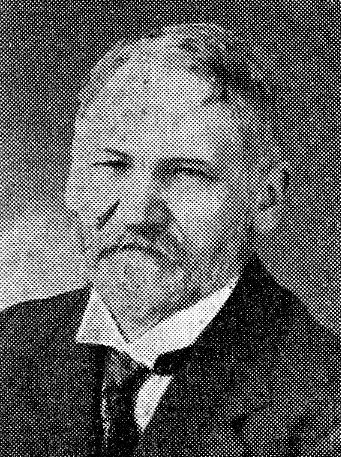

Andreas Paulson (16 February 1861 – 1 March 1953) was a Norwegian bank accountant, and also a literary and theatre critic.

He was born in Bergen as the son of politician Olav Paulssøn (1822–1896) and Anna Kristine Christofa Hagerup (1824–1917). His family had moved from Jølster Municipality the year before he was born, and Paulson spent most of his life in Bergen. He married Amalia Marie Geist in October 1888. He was a younger brother of Ragnvald Paulson.

Paulson did not finish his secondary education, but he spent formative years in the Bohemian movement and later the labour movement. In 1895 he was hired as a literary and theatre critic in the socialist newspaper Arbeidet. From 1898 he was also a music critic. He worked here until 1929, and then in Bergens Arbeiderblad from 1929 to 1941 with a second period after World War II. He also wrote humorous texts, both in Bergens Arbeiderblad and Hvepsen. The newspaper Arbeidet both belonged to the Labour Party (from 1905) and the Communist Party (from 1923) while Paulson worked in the newspaper, but as he was not involved in party politics, he was not affected by the schism between the two parties. His roots was in the labour movement as such, and he was widely known for his book Hvad skal Arbeiderne læse? (1914), where he sought to propagate the interest of literature in the working class. He believed in the concept of class struggle as a driving force in history, but also in the refinement and actions of individuals; being described by professor Harald Beyer as "an independent individualist".

Nonetheless, he was also involved in more bourgeois endeavors, being a consultant for the theatre Den Nationale Scene from 1928 to 1933. He also contributed to the biographical dictionary Norsk biografisk leksikon, and supported Riksmål as a written form of the Norwegian language. Parallel to his writing career, he worked for the Bank of Norway, being an accountant in its Bergen branch from 1901 until his retirement in 1929. He was honored with a Festschrift on his ninetieth birthday. He died in March 1953 in Bergen. He was a grandfather of Finn Ludt and Bjørn Paulson.
