= Ken Wiesner =

American high jumper (1925–2019)

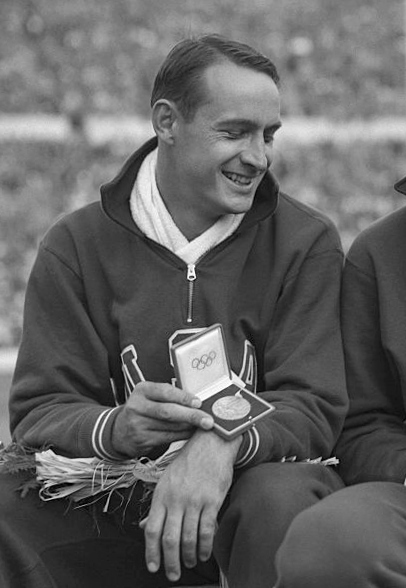
- Wiesner at the 1952 Olympics

Personal information
- Born: February 17, 1925 Milwaukee, Wisconsin, U.S.
- Died: March 20, 2019 (aged 94) Minocqua, Wisconsin, U.S.
- Height: 192 cm (6 ft 4 in)
- Weight: 91 kg (201 lb)

Sport
- Sport: Athletics
- Event: High jump
- Club: U.S. Navy

Achievements and titles
- Personal best: 2.10 m (1953i)
Medal record
Representing United States
Olympic Games
Silver medal – second place	1952 Helsinki	High jump

Kenneth George Wiesner (February 17, 1925 – March 20, 2019) was an American high jumper who won a silver medal at the 1952 Olympics. Wiesner attended Marquette University, where he was a three-time NCAA high jump champion. After the 1946 season he retired and became a dentist at U.S. Navy. He returned to compete at the 1952 Olympics, and in 1953 broke the world indoor record three times.
