= Anton Bolinder =

Swedish high jumper

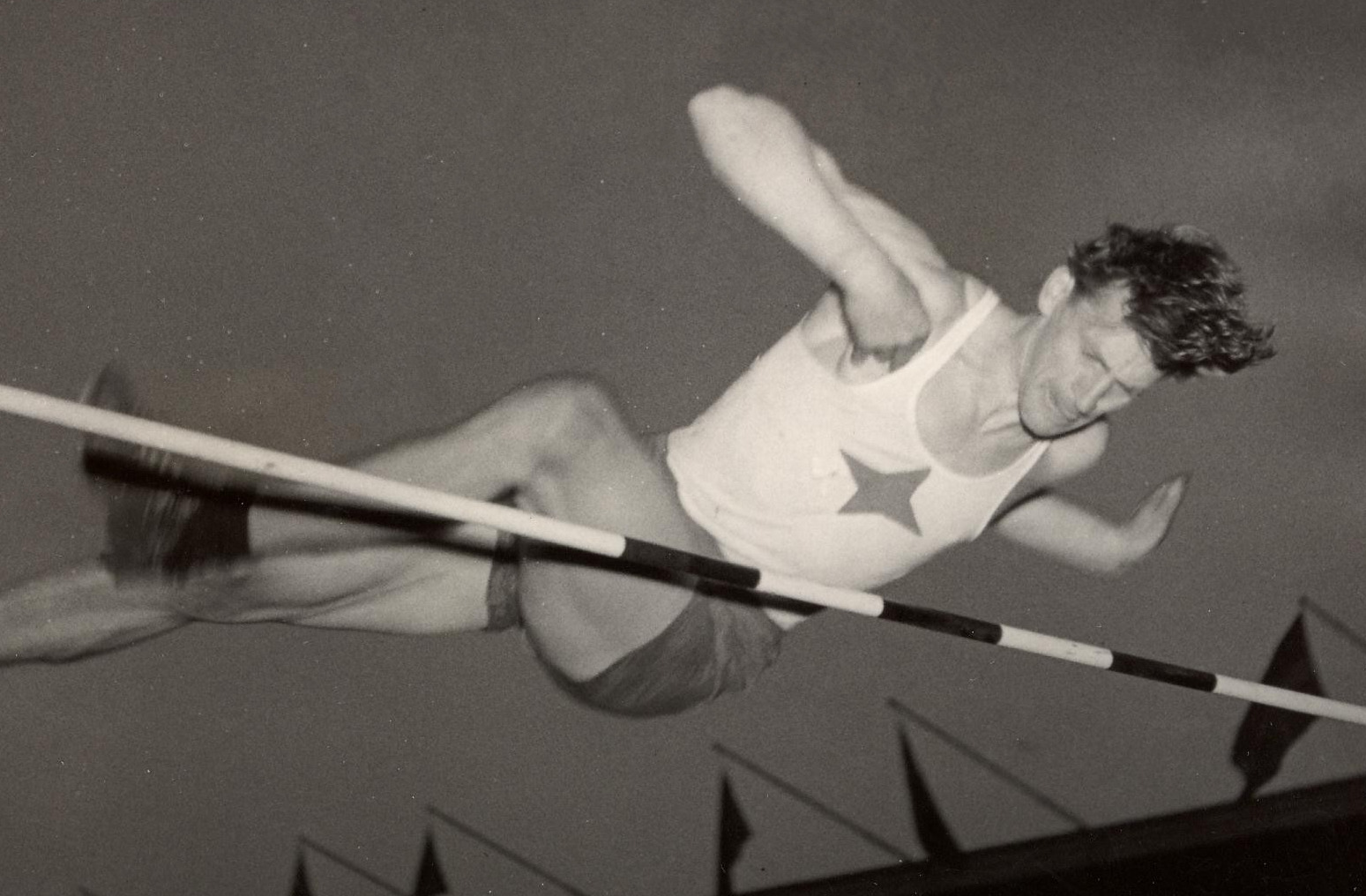

Personal information
- Born: 3 June 1915 Los, Sweden
- Died: 7 December 2006 (aged 91)

Sport
- Sport: Athletics
- Event: High jump
- Club: IFK Östersund

Achievements and titles
- Personal best: 1.99 m (1946)
Medal record
Men's athletics
Representing Sweden
European Championships
Gold medal – first place	1946 Oslo	High jump

Anton Bolinder (3 June 1915 – 7 December 2006) was a Swedish high jumper. He won a gold medal at the 1946 European Athletics Championships setting a new national record at 1.99 m (6 ft 6 1/4 in). For this achievement he was awarded the Stora grabbars märke in athletics (number 264). He also won two national titles, in 1946 and 1948.
