= Thio Ging Hwie =

Indonesian weightlifter (1923–1989)

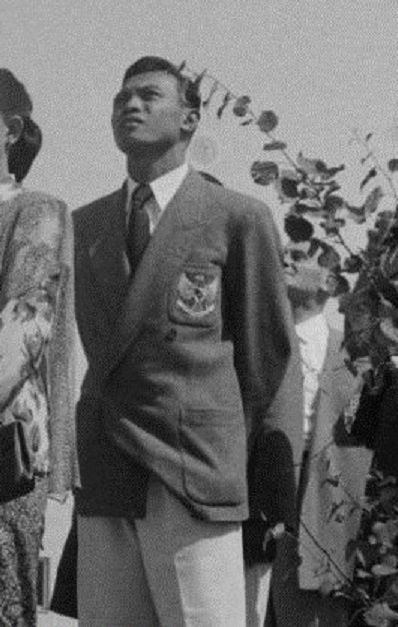
- Thio in 1952

Personal information
- Nationality: Indonesian
- Born: 29 November 1923 Yogyakarta, Indonesia
- Died: 4 June 1989 (aged 65) Jakarta, Indonesia

Sport
- Sport: Weightlifting
Medal record
Men's weightlifting
Representing Indonesia
Asian Games
Bronze medal – third place	1954 Manila	Lightweight

Eric Thio Ging Hwie (29 November 1923 – 4 June 1989), also known under his Chinese Indonesian name Wibowo Susetio, was a Chinese Indonesian weightlifter. He would start weightlifting in 1944 for his military training in Tangerang, using unused train tires. He would meet his wife in the city and eventually have seven children who would also train the sport. While training, he would eventually compete at the national level.

Thio would represent Indonesia at the 1952 Summer Olympics for the nation's first appearance at an Olympic Games, becoming the first Indonesian Olympian of Chinese descent. He competed in the men's lightweight event and placed ninth. Later on he would compete in competitions such as the 1954 Asian Games, winning bronze.

== Biography ==
Eric Thio Ging Hwie, also known under the Chinese Indonesian name Wibowo Susetio, was born on 29 November 1924 in Yogyakarta, Indonesia. Thio started weightlifting in 1944 for his military training in Tangerang. With fellow soldiers, they would use unused train wheels to train the sport. Eventually, Thio would reach the national level of the sport. While in Tangerang, he would meet his eventual wife Yap Lian Nio. They would have seven children that would also practice the sport.

During his weightlifting career, he would represent Indonesia at the 1952 Summer Olympics for the nation's first appearance at an Olympic Games. There, he would be the first Indonesian Olympian of Chinese descent. There, he would compete in the men's lightweight category for lifters that weighed 67.5 kilograms or less. He would compete in his event against 23 other athletes on 26 July. Thio would record a weight of 327.5 kilograms in the event, placing ninth overall.

After the 1952 Summer Games, Thio would compete in a competition in China in 1953 and the 1954 Asian Games in Manila. In the latter competition, he would win the bronze medal in the men's lightweight event. He would later die on 4 June 1989 in Jakarta, Indonesia.
