= Arne Ljungqvist =

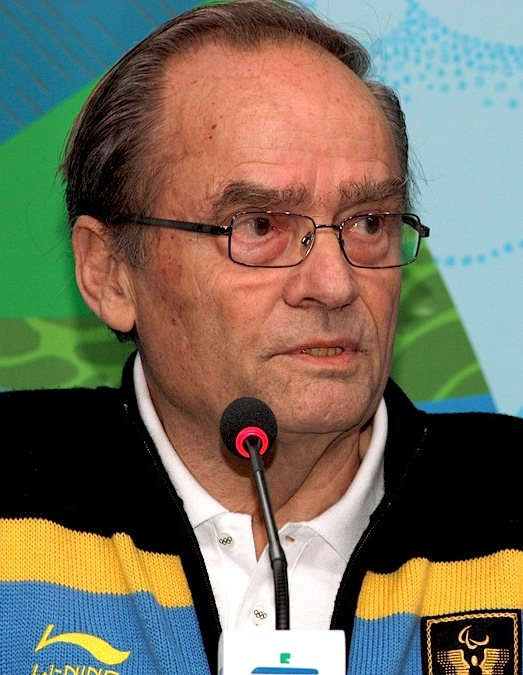
- Arne Ljungqvist during the Olympic Winter Games in Vancouver, British Columbia, Canada in February 2010

Personal information
- Born: 23 April 1931 (age 95) Stockholm, Sweden

Sport
- Sport: Athletics
- Event: High jump
- Club: Westermalms IF

Achievements and titles
- Personal best: 2.01 m (1952)

Arne Ljungqvist (born 23 April 1931) is a Swedish medical researcher, sports personality and retired high jumper. Ljungqvist is an honorary member of the International Olympic Committee (IOC), chairman of IOC's Medical Commission, and vice chairman of the World Anti-Doping Agency (WADA).

== Biography ==
Ljungqvist grew up in Ålsten, outside Stockholm, as the son of Gunnar Ljungqvist (1898-1968), a CEO in the insurance industry and right-wing politician, and his wife Solveig. In his youth, Arne Ljungqvist competed in the high jump, javelin throw and decathlon. In 1952 he won the national high jump title and finished 15th at the 1952 Summer Olympics. He then left competitive sports to complete his medical training.

Ljungqvist represented Sweden at the Olympic Games in Helsinki 1952 and was amongst the top three ranked high jumpers in Europe. That year, he achieved a personal best of 2.01m. He was the Swedish junior champion in the high jump, pole vault, and javelin in 1951 and the senior champion in the high jump in 1952.

Ljungqvist has three children with his wife Ulla (1933-2011).

=== Academic career ===
After his medical studies, Ljungqvist was appointed professor, serving from 1972 to 1983, and made medical research in the fields of renal and cardiovascular diseases and, later, oncology at the Karolinska Institute. In the last years of his academic career, he was rector of the Swedish School of Sport and Health Sciences in Stockholm from 1992 to 1996, an institution which has close collaboration with the Karolinska Institute in the field of sports medicine. He ended his professional career as President of the Swedish Cancer Society, 1992–2001.

=== Sports official ===
In the 1970s, he took on several roles as a sports official, first on the national level in Sweden and soon after in international organizations. He became a council member of the Swedish Athletic Association in 1970, and was its president from 1973 to 1981. He became a council member of the umbrella organization for Swedish sport, the Swedish Sports Confederation, in 1975, and was its president from 1991 to 2001. His international career as a sports official started when he became a council member of the International Association of Athletics Federations (IAAF) in 1976. He was one of IAAF's vice presidents from 1981 to 1999, and IAAF's senior vice president 1999–2007. He was a Council Member of the Swedish Olympic Committee 1989 - 2011.

In 2013 at the 125th IOC Session in Buenos Aires, Argentina, he retired as a member of IOC and became an honorary member. He is the chairman of its Medical Commission as of 2014. In 1994, he was elected a member of the IOC, and became the chairman of its Medical Commission in 2003.

=== Sports medicine and anti-doping work ===
Drawing benefit of his combined medical and sports background, Arne Ljungqvist was president of the Swedish Council of Sports Research from 1980 to 1993. In 1987, he became a member of IOC's Medical Commission, which has chaired since 2003. In these positions, Ljungqvist took notice of the increasing problems of doping in competitive sports, and its health consequences, and became a figure in anti-doping work. He became a board member of WADA when it was created in 1999, and later its vice chairman. He is also chairman of WADA's Health, Medical & Research Committee. Since 2008 he is the vice President of WADA. In 2013 at the world congress in Johannesburg, South Africa, he retired as vice President of WADA. He was the chairman of WADA's Health, Medical & Research Committee.

The foundation was founded in 2011, the same year he celebrated his 80th birthday. The baseplate was a gift from the sports organizations (The Swedish Sports Confederation, the International Olympic Committee), the Government and the Karolinska Institutet. The purpose of the foundation is to follow Ljungqvist’s legacy in promoting scientific research on anti-doping matters and education for clean sports. The foundation initiates research on anti-doping matters in society and supports anti-doping work in national and international sport, within the framework of the foundation’s own purpose.

Since January 2021 he has been one of the members of the Board of the Anti-Doping Foundation, in Sweden.

=== Awards ===
In 1991 Ljungvist received H. M. The King's Medal in the 12th size of seraphim band and in 1999 he was awarded the highest award of the Swedish Sports Confederation. In 2001 he received the KTH Grand Prize and in 2009 he was awarded the Swedish Sports Academy's Honorary Award. In 2008 he was granted Doctor honoris causa in sciences by the University of Loughborough in Great Britain, and was also awarded the "Sport and the Fight against Doping" Trophy. In 2012 he received the Olympic Order in silver. In 2014 during the Olympic Games in Sochi, Russia, his foundation, the Professor Arne Ljungqvist Anti-Doping Foundation, received Global Sports Developments' Humanitarian Award. In 2015 the Swedish government awarded him the royal medal Illis quorum meruere labores of the twelfth level (Latin for 'for those whose labors have deserved it'). He was Chamberlain to His Majesty the King of Sweden 1977–1986 and Lord-in-waiting to His Majesty the King of Sweden since then.
