= Gösta Svensson =

Swedish high jumper

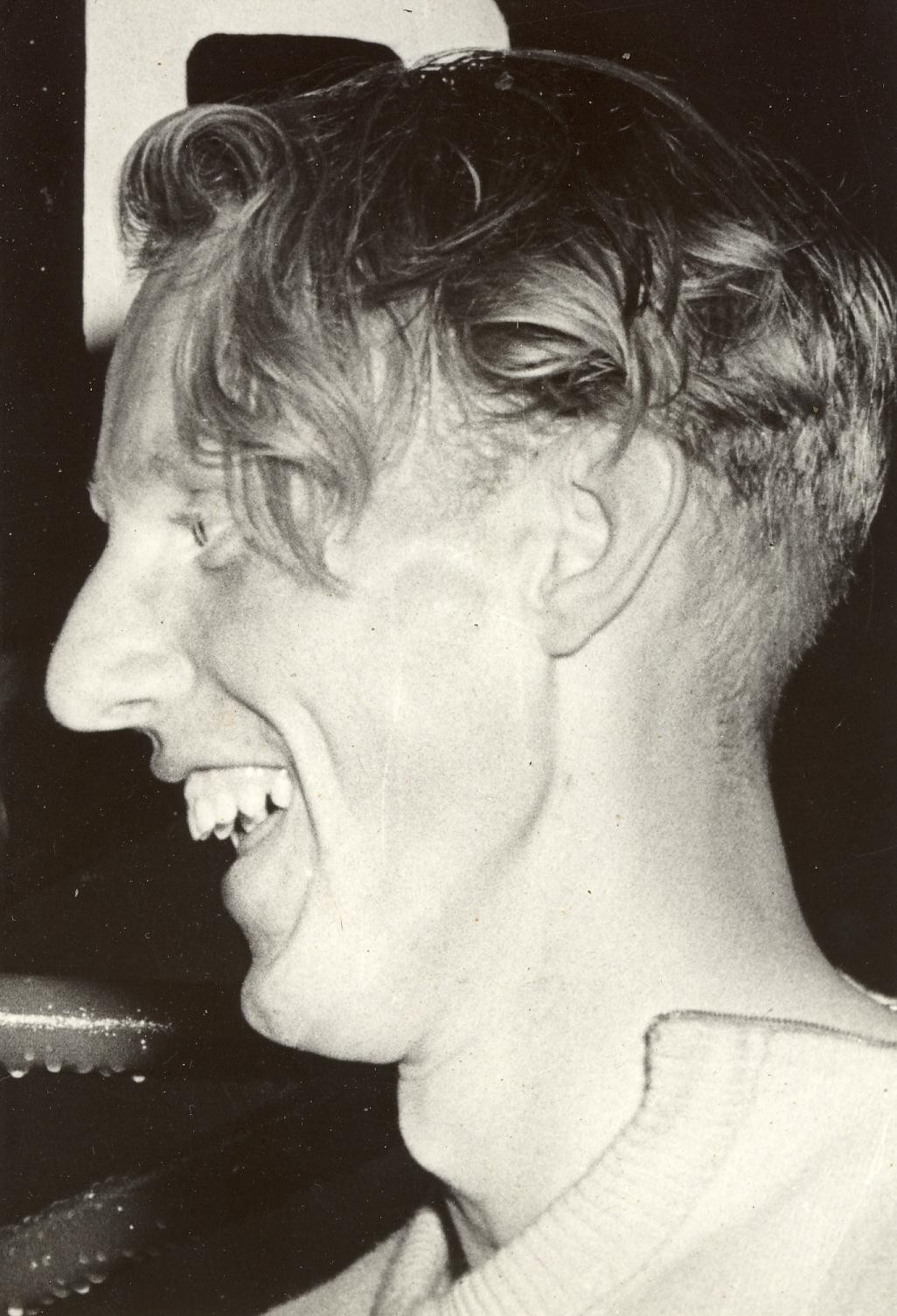

Personal information
- Born: 21 November 1929 Karlshamn, Sweden
- Died: 14 October 2018 (aged 88)
- Height: 1.90 m (6 ft 3 in)
- Weight: 81 kg (179 lb)

Sport
- Sport: Athletics
- Event: High jump
- Club: Svängsta IF

Achievements and titles
- Personal best: 2.02 m (1952)

Gösta Bernhard Svensson (21 November 1929 – 14 October 2018) was a Swedish high jumper. He competed at the 1950 European Athletics Championships and 1952 Summer Olympics and finished in fifth and fourth place, respectively. In 1952 he set a new national record at 2.02 m.
