= Yury Ilyasov =

Soviet high jumper (1926–2005)

Personal information
- Born: 30 November 1926 Leningrad, USSR
- Died: 26 December 2005 (aged 79) Saint Petersburg, Russia
- Height: 178 cm (5 ft 10 in)
- Weight: 80 kg (176 lb)

Sport
- Sport: Athletics
- Event: High jump
- Club: Iskra Leningrad

Achievements and titles
- Personal best: 2.00 m (1949)

Yury Mikhaylovich Ilyasov (Russian: Юрий Михайлович Илясов; 30 November 1926 – 26 December 2005) was a Soviet high jumper. He competed at the 1952 Summer Olympics and shared 13th place.
