= Habib Suharko =

Indonesian swimmer

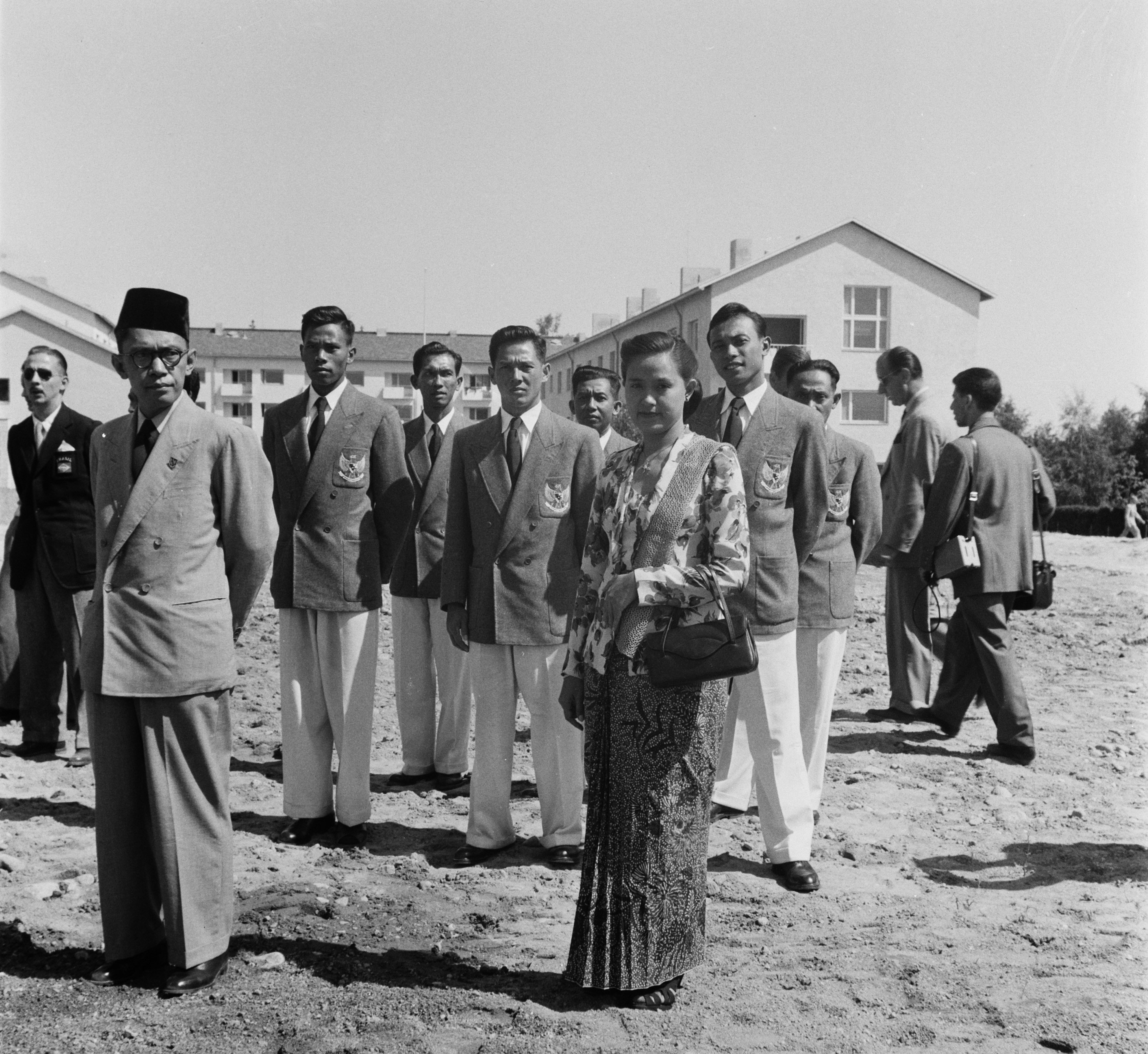
- Suharko (1952 Olympics)

Personal information
- Born: 10 December 1928 Java, Dutch East Indies
- Died: Java, Indonesia

Sport
- Sport: Swimming

Habib Suharko (born 10 December 1928) was an Indonesian swimmer. He competed in the men's 200 metre breaststroke at the 1952 Summer Olympics.
