= John Winter (athlete) =

Australian high jumper

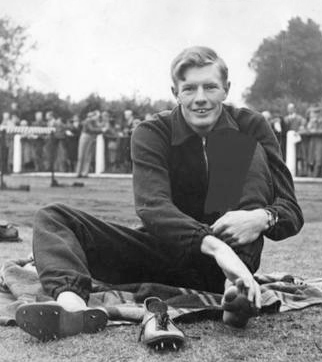

Personal information
- Born: 3 December 1924 Victoria Park, Western Australia
- Died: 5 December 2007 (aged 83) Perth, Western Australia

Sport
- Sport: Athletics
- Event: High jump

Achievements and titles
- Personal best: 2.013 m (1948)
Medal record
Representing Australia
Olympic Games
Gold medal – first place	1948 London	High jump
Commonwealth Games
Gold medal – first place	Auckland 1950	High jump

John Arthur "Jack" Winter (3 December 1924 – 5 December 2007) was an Australian high jumper who won that event at the 1948 Summer Olympics in London with a jump of 1.98 metres (6 ft. 6 in.).

A 23-year-old bank teller, Winter is Australia's only Olympic high jump gold medalist.

== Career ==
Winter's potential was first seen as a 15-year-old in the 1940 Interschool Carnival for Scotch College, Perth. He cleared 1.79 m. (5 ft. 10 3/8 in.) to win the under 16 event and 1.85 m. (6 ft. 0 7/8 in.) to win the open event.

He served in the RAAF in Britain during World War II and was about to join a Wellington Bomber squadron when the hostilities ended. After the war he returned to competition and won the 1947 and 1948 Australian championships.

The next year he joined the Australian team in London for the Olympic Games where he was considered an outside medal chance only against the strong American jumpers. Of the 26 competitors, only Winter and Georges Damitio used the unfashionable so-called eastern cut-off style of jumping. The rest used the straddle or the western roll. The competition took several hours, with cold rain falling for much of the time. When the bar reached 1.95 m (6 ft 4 3/4 in) five jumpers, including Winter, remained. At 1.98 m (6 ft 6 in) the other four failed with their first attempt. Winter, the last to jump, easily cleared the bar. The others, by then very cold and wet, failed with their other attempts. The irony was that all had jumped higher in previous competitions.

After the London Games, he stayed on in England, missing the 1949 Australian championships. He returned the following year and won the 1950 title in the lead up to the 1950 British Empire Games in Auckland. The Auckland Games gave him another gold medal, clearing 1.98 m. - the same height he'd achieved two years earlier. At the age of 26, Winter retired from competition soon after.

Winter's lifetime personal best was 2 m. (6 ft. 6 7/8 in.) when he won the 1948 Australian championship, although in training he is reported to have jumped 2.01 m. (6 ft. 7 1/4 in.). Most of his successes were achieved with leaps between 1.96 m. and 1.98 m.

== Awards ==
- He was awarded the Helms Award as the Outstanding Australian Athlete of 1947.
- He was inducted into the Western Australian Hall of Champions in 1985.
- A commemorative plaque on St Georges Terrace bears his name.
