= Bjørn Gundersen =

Norwegian high jumper (1924–2002)

Bjørn Gundersen (17 January 1924 – 1 August 2002) was a Norwegian high jumper who represented Elverum IL.

At the 1952 Summer Olympics he finished eighth in the high jump final with a jump of 1.90 metres (6 ft 3 in). He became Norwegian champion in 1947, 1951 and 1954.

His personal best jump was 1.96 metres (6 ft 5 in), achieved in August 1954, in Elverum.
