= Claude Bénard =

French high jumper (1926–2025)

- Bénard at the 1950 European Championships

Personal information
- Full name: Claude Edmond Adonis Bénard
- Nationality: French
- Born: 6 October 1926 Paris, France
- Died: 27 August 2025 (aged 98) Paris, France
- Height: 1.77 m (5 ft 10 in)
- Spouse: Rosine Faugouin (died 2018)

Sport
- Sport: Athletics
- Event: High jump
Medal record
Men's athletics
Representing France
European Championships
Bronze medal – third place	1950 Brussels	High jump

Claude Edmond Adonis Bénard (6 October 1926 – 27 August 2025) was a French athlete. He competed in the men's high jump at the 1948 Summer Olympics and the 1952 Summer Olympics.

A native of Paris, in his later years Bénard lived in Orléans with his wife Rosine Faugouin (1930–2018), also a former athlete. He died in Paris on 27 August 2025, at the age of 98.
