= Josiah Majekodunmi =

Nigerian high jumper (1927–1996)

Medal record

Men's Athletics

Representing Nigeria

British Empire Games
Silver medal – second place	Auckland 1950	High Jump

Josiah Olutunji Majekodunmi (12 April 1927 – 9 October 1996) was an athlete from Nigeria.

He competed at the 1950 British Empire Games at Auckland, New Zealand where he won Nigeria's first medal in any international sports, a silver medal in the Men's High Jump event.

Prior to the Commonwealth games, he captained Abeokuta Grammar School Athletics team to win the prestigious Grier Cup for Nigerian high schools in 1947 for the first and the last time. Majekodunmi placed 9th in the high jump event at the 1952 Helsinki Olympics. He was also the father of Miss Olawunmi Majekodunmi, the African Table Tennis champion for most of the 1970s and 1980s.
