= Birger Leirud =

Norwegian high jumper (1924–1999)

Birger Leirud (26 June 1924 – 10 February 1999) was a Norwegian high jumper. He represented Leirsund IL.

At the 1948 Summer Olympics he finished thirteenth in the high jump final with a jump of 1.80 metres. At the 1952 Summer Olympics he finished seventeenth with 1.90 m. He finished fourth at the 1946 European Championships in Athletics. He became Norwegian champion in 1946, 1949, 1950 and 1952.

His personal best jump was 1.96 metres, achieved in September 1947 in Stockholm.
