= Hans Wahli =

Swiss high jumper

Personal information
- Nationality: Swiss
- Born: 11 January 1927
- Died: 4 January 2012 (aged 84)

Sport
- Sport: Athletics
- Event: High jump

Hans Wahli (11 January 1927 – 4 January 2012) was a Swiss athlete. He competed in the men's high jump at the 1948 Summer Olympics and the 1952 Summer Olympics.
