= Georges Damitio =

French high jumper (1924–1994)

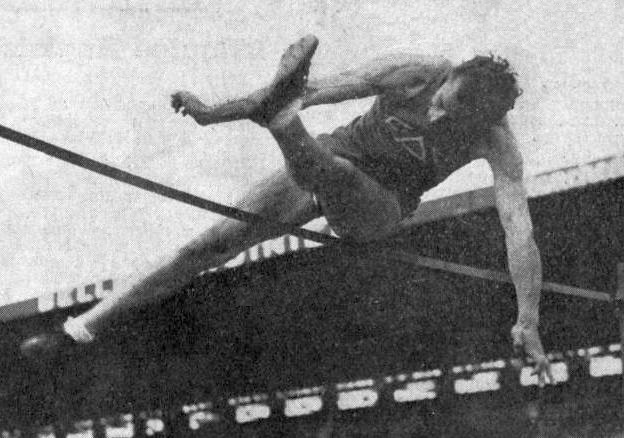
- Damitio in 1946

Personal information
- Full name: Georges Étienne Louis Damitio
- Born: 20 May 1924 Toulouse, France
- Died: 7 September 1994 (aged 70) Biarritz, France
- Height: 185 cm (6 ft 1 in)

Sport
- Country: France
- Sport: Athletics
- Event: High jump
Medal record
Mediterranean Games
Gold medal – first place	1951 Alexandria	High jump

Georges Étienne Louis Damitio (20 May 1924 – 7 September 1994]) was a French high jumper who competed in the 1948 Summer Olympics and in the 1952 Summer Olympics.
