= Ron Pavitt =

British athlete (1926–1988)

Personal information
- Nationality: British (English)
- Born: 15 September 1926 Hammersmith, London, England
- Died: 31 January 1988 (aged 61) Watford, England
- Height: 186 cm (6 ft 1 in)
- Weight: 75 kg (165 lb)

Sport
- Sport: Athletics
- Event: High jump
- Club: Polytechnic Harriers

Ronald Cecil John Pavitt (15 September 1926 – 31 January 1988) was a British athlete who competed in the men's high jump at the 1948 Summer Olympics and the 1952 Summer Olympics.

== Biography ==
In 1944, Pavitt won the AAA Southern Area junior title and in 1946 won the two titles at the Royal Navy and Royal Marines Championship. Pavitt was a radio mechanic with the Royal Navy Air Command at the time but would later work for Lyons food. Additionally in 1946 he finished second behind Alan Paterson in the high jump event at the 1946 AAA Championships. Pavitt finished second again, this time behind Adegboyega Adedoyin at the 1947 AAA Championships.

Pavitt represented the Great Britain team at the 1948 Olympic Games in London before finishing second for the third and fourth time at the 1949 AAA Championships and 1950 AAA Championships, Alan Paterson proving his nemesis again on both occasions.

Pavitt represented the England team in the high jump at the 1950 British Empire Games in Auckland, New Zealand and later that summer finally became British high jump champion after winning the British AAA Championships title at the 1950 AAA Championships.

Pavitt retained his AAA title at the 1951 AAA Championships before being selected for his second Olympics. He represented the Great Britain team at the 1952 Olympic Games in Helsinki, finishing fifth and missing a medal by just 3cm.
